= List of Boland representative cricketers =

List of cricketers

This is a list of all cricketers who have played first-class, List A or Twenty20 cricket for Boland cricket team in South Africa. Seasons given are first and last seasons; the player did not necessarily play in all the intervening seasons.

== A ==
- Craig Abrahams, 2006/07
- Shaakir Abrahams, 2018/19
- Ziyaad Abrahams, 2016/17–2019/20
- Warwick Abrahim, 2017/18–2019/20
- Zahir Abrahim, 1997/98–2006/07
- Sean Ackermann, 1996/97–1998/99
- Brendon Adams, 2001/02–2008/09
- Ferisco Adams, 2011/12–2019/20
- James Albanie, 1995/96–1999/00
- Wallace Albertyn, 1997/98–2006/07
- Craig Alexander, 2019/20
- Pravin Amre, 1999/00
- Iain Anderson, 1983/84
- Sean Andrews, 1991/92–1993/94
- Pienaar Anker, 1981/82–1990/91
- Rayno Arendse, 1997/98–2009/10
- Clayton August, 2003/04–2009/10

== B ==
- Bryan Baguley, 1995/96–1997/98
- Rupert Bailey, 1998/99–2005/06
- Eddie Barlow, 1981/82–1982/83
- Hendrik Barnard, 1989/90–1993/94
- Jacobus Barnard, 1989/90–1990/91
- Pieter Barnard, 2000/01
- Solomon Barnard, 1979/80–1983/84
- Kim Barnett, 1982/83–1987/88
- Simon Base, 1987/88–1988/89
- Hendrik Basson, 1979/80–1987/88
- Raymond Bath, 1979/80–1980/81
- Chad Baxter, 2002/03–2003/04
- David Bedingham, 2015/16–2018/19
- Howard Bergins, 1981/82–1986/87
- Wayne Bird, 1991/92–1992/93
- Uwe-Karl Birkenstock, 2009/10–2014/15
- Henco Bornmann, 2011/12
- Tennyson Botes, 2006/07
- Dewald Botha, 2003/04–2015/16
- Gabriel Botha, 1990/91
- Niel Botha, 2007/08–2017/18
- Schoeman Botha, 1988/89
- Johannes Bothma, 2001/02–2009/10
- Mark Bredell, 1994/95
- Jean Bredenkamp, 2008/09–2016/17
- Kevin Bridgens, 1988/89–1992/93
- Matt Brink, 1992/93–1997/98
- Robert Brown, 1986/87–1989/90
- Jaco Burger, 1992/93

== C ==
- Ian Callen, 1985/86
- Dale Campbell, 2005/06–2007/08
- Mike Cann, 1993/94
- Ryan Canning, 2012/13–2013/14
- Neil Carter, 1998/99–2003/04
- Junaid Cassiem, 2008/09–2017/18
- Barry Chedburn, 1991/92–1994/95
- Daniel Childs, 2006/07–2011/12
- Jonathan Clark, 2003/04–2004/05
- Achille Cloete, 2014/15–2019/20
- Tiaan Cloete, 2004/05–2014/15
- Charl Coetzee, 1979/80–1985/86
- John Commins, 1993/94–1994/95
- Murray Commins, 2017/18–2018/19
- Kevin Curran, 1994/95–1997/98
- Andrew Cyster, 2000/01–2003/04
- Charl Cyster, 2016/17–2019/20
- Reeve Cyster, 2011/12–2019/20

== D ==
- Robert Dalrymple, 1992/93–1994/95
- Pieter Daneel, 2000/01–2006/07
- Dominic Daniels, 2009/10–2010/11
- Siphamandla Dapo, 2016/17
- Faiek Davids, 1993/94
- Henry Davids, 1998/99–2009/10
- Fritz de Beer, 2017/18–2019/20
- Phillip DeFreitas, 1993/94–1995/96
- Manfred de Kock, 1999/00–2000/01
- Andre de Lange, 2008/09
- Con de Lange, 1993/94–2006/07
- Abraham de Swardt, 1988/89–1989/90
- Colin Dettmer, 1991/92–1993/94
- Jacques de Villiers, 1979/80–1981/82
- John de Villiers, 1989/90–1992/93
- Morne de Vries, 2002/03–2010/11
- Hennie de Wet, 2007/08–2009/10
- Justin Dill, 2007/08–2016/17
- Sifundo Dimaza, 2013/14
- Ockert Douglas, 1987/88–1989/90
- Bryan Drew, 1992/93–1998/99
- Andre du Toit, 1979/80–1986/87
- Jacobus du Toit, 1986/87–1989/90
- Willem du Toit, 1997/98–2008/09

== E ==
- Grant Edmeades, 2014/15–2015/16
- Allan Elgar, 1992/93–1993/94
- Rabian Engelbrecht, 2005/06–2012/13
- Cedric English, 1998/99–1999/00
- Marais Erasmus, 1988/89–1996/97
- Ockert Erasmus, 2006/07–2014/15
- Wesley Euley, 2003/04–2004/05

== F ==
- Evert Ferreira, 1996/97–1998/99
- Lloyd Ferreira, 1993/94–1996/97
- Lambert Fick, 1982/83–1983/84
- Winston Fortuin, 1993/94–1997/98
- Henri Fourie, 2003/04–2005/06
- Faan Fourie, 2010/11
- Bardo Fransman, 2003/04–2006/07
- Matthew Friedlander, 2001/02–2003/04
- Jan Frylinck, 2008/09–2012/13

== G ==
- Isma-eel Gafieldien, 2014/15–2019/20
- Douglas Gain, 1998/99–1999/00
- Dayyaan Galiem, 2018/19
- Francois Geldenhuys, 2005/06
- Gereldo George, 2015/16
- L Germishuys, 1993/94 (Note: Germishuys played in one first-class match for Boland in the 1993/94 season. No biographical details are known.)
- Louis-Marc Germishuys, 1993/94–1996/97
- Brandon Glover, 2016/17–2018/19
- Sinalo Gobeni, 2016/17–2019/20
- Chad Grainger, 1997/98–1998/99
- Stephanus Grobler, 2006/07–2008/09
- Ryan Groeneveld, 2002/03–2006/07
- Warren Groeneveld, 2007/08–2011/12

== H ==
- Warren Hayward, 2001/02–2008/09
- Philip Hearle, 1997/98
- Benjamin Hector, 1999/00–2007/08
- Claude Henderson, 1990/91–1997/98
- James Henderson, 1992/93–2001/02
- Tyron Henderson, 2007/08
- Darryl Hendricks, 2014/15–2018/19
- John Hendricks, 1979/80–1988/89
- Charles Hendrikse, 1980/81–1982/83
- Erasmus Hendrikse, 2003/04
- Omar Henry, 1984/85–1993/94
- Riyaad Henry, 2005/06–2015/16
- Cecil Heydenrych, 1987/88–1990/91
- George Hlazo, 2014/15
- Lloyd Hobson, 2007/08
- Denys Hobson, 2002/03–2005/06
- Stuart Hockly, 1994/95
- Rohan Hoffman, 1993/94–1994/95
- Adrian Holdstock, 1993/94–1995/96

== I ==
- Alan Igglesden, 1992/93

== J ==
- Kenny Jackson, 1993/94–2001/02
- Lawton Jacobs, 1983/84–1988/89
- Roelof Jacobs, 2007/08
- Rushdi Jappie, 2012/13–2013/14
- Stephen Jefferies, 1993/94
- Petrus Jeftha, 2002/03–2015/16
- Stephen Jones, 1981/82–1987/88
- Henno Jordaan, 2008/09–2011/12
- Hendrik Joubert, 1984/85–1985/86
- Johannes Justus, 1984/85–1990/91

== K ==
- Vinod Kambli, 2002/03
- Quinton Kannemeyer, 2002/03–2010/11
- Thomas Kannemeyer, 2013/14–2019/20
- Eldred Kasner, 1979/80–1980/81
- Jerry Kennedy, 1958/59–1980/81
- Leslie Kets, 1982/83–1985/86
- Simon Khomari, 2015/16–2019/20
- Donovan Koch, 1998/99–2001/02
- Louis Koen, 1990/91–2001/02
- Pieter Koen, 1990/91–1991/92
- Derek Kohler, 1984/85
- Hanno Kotze, 2009/10–2019/20
- Manrich Kotze, 2008/09–2010/11
- Emile Kriek, 2006/07–2015/16
- Ian Kuiler, 1995/96–1996/97
- Adrian Kuiper, 1995/96–1997/98

== L ==
- Marius La Grange, 1986/87–1987/88
- Peter Laing, 2005/06–2007/08
- Nicolaas Lambrechts, 1982/83–1990/91
- Charl Langeveldt, 1997/98–2013/14
- W Laubscher, 1979/80–1980/81 (Note: Laubscher played in one List A match for Boland in the 1980/81 season. No biographical details are known.)
- Terence Lazard, 1993/94–1995/96
- Leon le Roux, 2009/10–2012/13
- Darryl le Roux, 1984/85
- L le Roux, 1982/83 (Note: Le Roux played in one List A match for Boland in the 1982/83 season. No biographical details are known.)
- Elmar Liebenberg, 1995/96–1996/97
- Ernest Looch, 1998/99
- Zaheer Lorgat, 2012/13–2014/15
- Conrad Lotz, 2007/08
- Matthys Lotz, 1989/90–1990/91
- Michael Loubser, 2011/12–2015/16
- Curtley Louw, 2008/09–2018/19
- Johann Louw, 2010/11–2013/14
- Willem Louw, 2003/04–2005/06
- Craig Lowe, 1989/90–1990/91

== M ==
- Jonathan Mackey, 1997/98
- Rashaad Magiet, 2003/04
- Monde Mahlombe, 2013/14–2014/15
- Daniel Malan, 1979/80–1981/82
- Dawid Malan, 2000/01–2005/06
- Pieter Malan, 2017/18–2018/19
- Craig Marais, 1993/94–1994/95
- Graeme Marais, 2001/02–2003/04
- Jean Marais, 2014/15–2015/16
- Rico Marais, 1988/89–1990/91
- Sinegugu Maseko, 2015/16–2016/17
- Thando Mdodana, 2012/13
- Fenito Mehl, 2010/11–2019/20
- Carl Mellors, 1988/89–1989/90
- David Millns, 1996/97
- Phumza Mntungwa, 2014/15–2017/18
- Francois Moolman, 1979/80-1980/81
- Tshepo Moreki, 2015/16
- Faisel Mosoval, 1997/98-2000/01
- Mangaliso Mtiya, 2016/17
- Zurich Muller, 1995/96
- James Munnik, 1984/85–1987/88
- Jodi Myers, 1994/95–2000/01

== N ==
- Imran Nackerdien, 2003/04–2013/14
- Salieg Nackerdien, 1983/84–1995/96
- Anwell Newman, 1992/93–1997/98
- Phil Newport, 1987/88
- Karl Nieuwoudt, 2003/04–2010/11
- Nicholas Northcote, 2005/06

== O ==
- André Odendaal, 1980/81–1981/82
- Aidan Olivier, 2005/06–2007/08
- Mario Olivier, 2004/05
- Justin Ontong, 1992/93–2017/18
- Riaan Oosthuizen, 1991/92–1996/97

== P ==
- Steve Palframan, 1997/98–2002/03
- Gordon Parsons, 1983/84–1984/85
- Hillroy Paulse, 2003/04–2015/16
- Trevor Penney, 1991/92
- Keegan Petersen, 2009/10–2016/17
- Robin Peterson, 2015/16
- Sean Phillips, 2003/04–2004/05
- Danico Philmon, 2012/13–2018/19
- Marc Pina, 1987/88–1990/91
- Bradley Player, 1999/00–2000/01
- Soyisile Pono, 2014/15–2016/17
- Anthonie Potgieter, 1979/80–1980/81
- Johannes Pretorius, 1983/84
- Andrew Pringle, 2000/01–2001/02
- Clifford Prinsloo, 2004/05–2006/07

== Q ==
- Zakhele Qwabe, 2013/14–2017/18

== R ==
- Wayne Radford, 1988/89
- Omphile Ramela, 2007/08–2011/12
- Carl Raubenheimer, 2009/10–2013/14
- Barry Richards, 1992/93–1993/94
- Ian Richards, 1987/88–1989/90
- Leon Roberts, 1979/80–1984/85
- John Roos, 1987/88–1994/95
- David Rushmere, 2019/20

== S ==
- Mark Sanders, 2003/04
- Pepler Sandri, 1996/97–2008/09
- Kobus Scholtz, 2017/18–2019/20
- Richard Schultz, 1979/80–1981/82
- Waylain September, 2001/02–2008/09
- Nkululeko Serame, 2017/18–2019/20
- Letlotlo Sesele, 2012/13–2013/14
- Kyle Simmonds, 2016/17–2018/19
- Daniel Sincuba, 2018/19–2019/20
- Martinus Smit, 1983/84–1985/86
- Willem Smit, 1992/93–2006/07
- Deon Smith, 1990/91–1993/94
- Richard Smith, 1992/93–1995/96
- Neil Snyman, 1989/90–1992/93
- Carl Spilhaus, 1985/86–1987/88
- Billy Stelling, 1994/95–1996/97
- John Stephenson, 1988/89
- Godfrey Stevens, 2001/02–2016/17
- Gerhard Strydom, 1994/95–2007/08
- Shane Summers, 2005/06–2006/07
- Warren Swan, 2003/04–2006/07
- Josua Swanepoel, 2001/02–2006/07
- Peter Swart, 1981/82–1982/83
- Pieter Swart, 1994/95
- Leighton Swarts, 2016/17

== T ==
- Jacob Taljaard, 1986/87–1987/88
- Roger Telemachus, 1993/94–1997/98
- Ruan Terblanche, 2008/09–2019/20
- Gary Thomas, 1987/88
- Detlev Traut, 1979/80–1984/85
- Jonathan Trott, 1999/00–2000/01
- Wayne Truter, 1987/88–1996/97
- Cebo Tshiki, 2014/15–2019/20

== V ==
- Wayne van As, 1991/92–1994/95
- Martyn van Blommenstein, 1981/82
- Casper van der Merwe, 1979/80–1982/83
- Mark van der Merwe, 1990/91–1992/93
- Janse van der Ryst, 1991/92
- Mark van Heerden, 2012/13–2013/14
- Johannes van Rensburg (cricketer), 1988/89
- Essias van Rooyen, 1980/81–1988/89
- Wickus van Vuuren, 2004/05–2011/12
- Dewald van Wyk, 1998/99–1999/00 (Note: Van Wyk played in one List A match for Boland in the 1998/99 season. No biographical details are known.)
- Jacques van Wyk, 1998/99–2008/09
- Lenert van Wyk, 2002/03–2012/13
- Dan van Zyl, 1998/99
- Stiaan van Zyl, 2001/02–2016/17
- Ricardo Vasconcelos, 2016/17–2017/18
- Herman Venter, 1998/99
- Gilliam Vermeulen, 1985/86–1988/89
- Chris Viljoen, 1979/80–1981/82
- John Villet, 1994/95–1995/96
- Andre Volsteedt, 1994/95–1995/96
- Chrisjan Vorster, 1993/94–1996/97
- Vinod Kambli

== W ==
- Jacques Wahl, 1991/92–1993/94
- Paul Wallace, 1979/80–1982/83
- Lee-Roy Walters, 2004/05–2011/12
- Benjamin Ward, 2019/20
- Andre Wasserfall, 1980/81
- Andrew Watts, 1985/86–1986/87
- Andrew Wessels, 1995/96–1996/97
- Stuart White, 1992/93–1993/94
- Timothy Whitehead, 2019/20
- Justin Wiggill, 1995/96–1997/98
- Louis Wilkinson, 2002/03
- Brandon Williams, 2009/10
- Elton Williams, 1996/97–1997/98
- Henry Williams, 1991/92–2003/04
- Lizaad Williams, 2008/09–2019/20
- Charl Willoughby, 1994/95–1999/00
- Craig Wilson, 1999/00
- Sarel Wolmarans, 1998/99–1999/00
- Andrew Wylie, 1992/93–1997/98
