= List of Western Province representative cricketers =

This is a partial list of cricketers who have played first-class, List A or Twenty20 cricket matches for the Western Province cricket team in domestic South African men's cricket competitions.

== A ==
- HD Ackerman
- Hylton Ackerman
- Sean Ackermann
- Paul Adams
- Qaasim Adams
- Mark Adrianatos
- Craig Alexander
- Biddy Anderson
- Gobo Ashley
- Michael Austen

== B ==
- Faoud Bacchus
- Bryan Baguley
- Peter Bairnsfather-Cloete
- Xen Balaskas
- Eddie Barlow
- Bradley Barnes
- Vincent Barnes
- Simon Base
- Derrin Bassage
- David Bedingham
- Farhaan Behardien
- Mansel Bell
- Sandy Bell
- Gareth Berg
- Carlisle Best
- Jonathan Bird
- Arthur Bisset
- Murray Bisset
- George Bissett
- Jimmy Blanckenberg
- Tladi Bokako
- Gerald Bond
- Johannes Bothma
- Derek Brand
- Josh Breed
- Gary Bricknell
- Kevin Bridgens
- Harry Bromfield
- Trevor Brown
- Stephen Bruce
- Andre Bruyns
- Edward Budgen
- Nandre Burger
- Izak Buys

== C ==
- Henry Calder
- Jock Cameron
- Dale Campbell
- Ryan Canning
- William Carlsson
- Paddy Carolin
- James Alexander Carse
- Herbert Hayton Castens
- Anthony Catt
- Edward Challenor
- Wally Chalmers
- Jack Cheetham
- Grahame Chevalier
- Taariq Chiecktey
- Jesse Christensen
- Shunter Coen
- Michael Cohen
- John Cole
- Mick Commaille
- John Commins
- John Commins
- Kevin Commins
- Sedick Conrad
- Shukri Conrad
- Dalton Conyngham
- Chris Cooke
- Austen Cowper
- Basil Crews
- Godfrey Cripps
- Bob Crisp
- Daryll Cullinan

== D ==
- Ivan Dagnin
- Faiek Davids
- Thomas Davidson
- Douglas Davies
- Alan Dawson
- Rupert de Smidt
- Louis Delport
- Ronnie Delport
- Archibald Difford
- Isaac Dikgale
- Justin Dill
- Desmond Dimbleby
- Kenneth Dimbleby
- Michael Doman
- Harold Donachie
- Desmond Drummer
- Francois Drummer
- Diego du Plessis
- Morné du Plessis
- Jacobus du Toit
- Benjamin Duff
- Jon Dumbrill
- JP Duminy
- Jacobus Duminy

== E ==
- Grant Edmeades
- Allan Elgar
- Zac Elkin
- John Emburey
- Sybrand Engelbrecht
- Cedric English
- Wesley Euley

== F ==
- David Fernley
- John Ferrandi
- Lloyd Ferreira
- Duncan Fletcher
- William Foley
- Denis Foreman
- Clyde Fortuin
- John Fox
- Howard Francis
- Tiny Francis
- Quinton Friend
- Harry Fuller
- Eddie Fuller
- Myolisi Fumba

== G ==
- Dayyaan Galiem
- Ivor Gardiner
- Jack Gentry
- Herschelle Gibbs
- Abraham Glantz
- Frederick Goldstein
- Mathew Goles
- Sharn Gomes
- Graham Gooch
- Evan Gordon
- Robert Graham
- Alistair Gray
- Mike Groves

== H ==
- Zubayr Hamza
- Kenneth Hands
- Philip Hands
- Reginald Hands
- Martin Hanley
- Jon Hardy
- Paul Harris
- Desmond Haynes
- Frank Hearne
- George Alfred Lawrence Hearne
- Claude Henderson
- Beuran Hendricks
- Rani Hendricks
- Donovan Henry
- Omar Henry
- Cecil Hickley
- Anthony Hobson
- Denys Hobson
- Tommy Hobson
- Andrew Hodgson
- Adrian Holdstock
- Bob Homani
- John Hopley
- Stanley Horwood
- David Howell

== I ==
- Alan Igglesden
- Laurence Impey
- Gerald Innes

== J ==
- Robin Jackman
- Kenny Jackson
- Dirk Jackson
- Rushdi Jappie
- Stephen Jefferies
- Neil Johnson
- Stephen Jones

== K ==
- Jacques Kallis
- Yves Kamanzi
- Gavin Kaplan
- Zakir Kathrada
- Geoff Keith
- Shaheen Khan
- Sid Kiel
- Gary Kirsten
- Paul Kirsten
- Peter Kirsten
- Ryan Klein
- Johnny Kleinveldt
- Matthew Kleinveldt
- Rory Kleinveldt
- Donovan Koch
- Pieter Koen
- Sven Koenig
- Derek Kohler
- Clive Kolbe
- Carlos Koyana
- Adrian Kuiper
- Frederick Kuys

== L ==
- Peter Laing
- Neville Lakay
- Allan Lamb
- Terence Lazard
- Darryl le Roux
- Garth Le Roux
- Michael Lee
- Richard Levi
- Plum Lewis
- James Liddle
- George Linde
- George Lohmann
- Michael Loubser
- Brendon Louw
- Bill Lundie
- Frederick Luyt

== M ==
- Mike Macaulay
- Rashaad Magiet
- Saait Magiet
- Monde Mahlombe
- Bonga Makaka
- Andre Malan
- Janneman Malan
- Jack Manack
- Brett Matthews
- Craig Matthews
- Sisonke Mazele
- William McAdam
- Sibley McAdam
- David McCay
- Jono McLean
- David McMeeking
- Brian McMillan
- Thando Mdodana
- Basil Melle
- Michael Melle
- Renaldo Meyer
- Aviwe Mgijima
- Bonnor Middleton
- David Millard
- Hamish Miller
- Charles Mills
- William Henry Milton
- Charles Minnaar
- Derek Mitchell
- Neo Mlumbi
- Lynton Morby-Smith
- Denys Morkel
- Raymond Morkel
- John Morris
- Richard Morris
- Mihlali Mpongwana
- Travis Muller
- Brian Murphy
- Robbie Muzzell
- Henry Myles

== N ==
- Mthiwekhaya Nabe
- Coetie Neethling
- Jack Nel
- Jack Newby
- Ossie Newton-Thompson
- Lesiba Ngoepe
- Mpilo Njoloza
- Norman Norton
- Dave Nourse
- Thando Ntini

== O ==
- Sid O'Linn
- Riaan Oosthuizen
- Douglas Ovenstone
- Tuppy Owen-Smith

== P ==
- Allahudien Paleker
- Archibald Palm
- Dane Paterson
- Ian Payne
- Thokozani Peter
- Brian Pfaff
- Gavin Pfuhl
- Luke Philander
- Vernon Philander
- Dane Piedt
- Roy Pienaar
- David Pithey
- Tony Pithey
- Francois Plaatjies
- Bradley Player
- Jack Plimsoll
- Michael Pote
- Jim Pothecary
- David Price
- Charles Prince
- Ashwell Prince
- Meyrick Pringle
- Mike Procter
- Andrew Puttick
- Andy Pycroft

== R ==
- Gurshwin Rabie
- Richard Rail
- Nobbie Ralph
- Romano Ramoo
- Paul Rayment
- Tom Reddick
- Norman Reid
- Lindsay Reid-Ross
- Alfred Richards
- Michael Rippon
- Jack Robertson
- George Rowe
- Hugh Roy
- Dave Rundle
- Colin Rushmere
- John Rushmere
- Richard Ryall

== S ==
- David Schierhout
- Brett Schultz
- Emmanuel Sebareme
- Arthur Seccull
- Lawrence Seeff
- Emanuel Sererami
- Louis Serrurier
- Richard Seymour
- Kelly Seymour
- John Siedle
- Kyle Simmonds
- Eric Simons
- Jason Smith
- Daniel Smith
- Graeme Smith
- Stanley Snooke
- Tip Snooke
- Neil Snyman
- Carl Spilhaus
- Billy Stelling
- Chris Stephens
- Godfrey Steyn
- Warren Stoman
- Michael Stonier
- Jean Strydom
- Peter Swart

== T ==
- Herbie Taylor
- Roger Telemachus
- Dominic Telo
- Ryan ten Doeschate
- Nicolaas Theunissen
- Alfonso Thomas
- Steytler Thwaits
- Mujaahid Toffar
- Jonathan Trott
- Thami Tsolekile
- David Turner
- Graeme Turner
- Percy Twentyman-Jones

== V ==
- Yaseen Vallie
- Hayes van der Berg
- Peter van der Merwe
- Pieter van der Bijl
- Voltelin van der Bijl
- Willem van der Merwe
- Robbie van Graan
- Clive van Ryneveld
- Shadley van Schalkwyk
- Stiaan van Zyl
- Kyle Verreynne
- Dane Vilas
- De Villiers Graaff
- Roy Virgin
- Michael Voss

== W ==
- Tayo Walbrugh
- Peter Walker
- Martin Walters
- Howard Watt
- Colin Wells
- Kirk Wernars
- Kepler Wessels
- Dick Westcott
- David Whitefield
- James Whitehead
- William Wiley
- Owen Williams
- Gertjie Williams
- Lizaad Williams
- Charl Willoughby
- Joseph Willoughby
- William Wilson
- Ivan Wingreen
- Bob Woolmer
- Godfrey Wrentmore
- Owen Wynne

== X ==
- Lundi Xhongo

== Y ==
- Simphiwe Yiba

== Z ==
- Monde Zondeki
