= List of Cape Cobras cricketers =

This is a list of cricketers who played for the South African franchise team Cape Cobras between the 2003–04 season and 2020–21. It includes the players who appeared for the team in first-class, List A and Twenty20 competitions during the period in which the team was a franchise.

During 2003, Cricket South Africa changed the way in which top-class domestic cricket in the country was organised. This created six franchise teams at the top level of domestic competition, combining the existing provincial teams to create an elite competition. Cape Cobras were formed by combining the two existing teams in the Western Cape province, Western Province and Boland. Initially the team competed in the 2003–04 CSA T20 Challenge, before the CSA 4-Day Domestic Series and CSA One-Day Cup also became franchise-only competitions the following season. For two seasons the team competed under the name Western Province Boland before adopting the name Cape Cobras from the start of the 2005–06 season. South Western Districts became part of the Cape Cobras franchise in March 2015, having previously been part of the Warriors franchise. (Note: South Western Districts, also geographically part of the Western Cape, had initially been part of the structure which fed in to the Warriors in the Eastern Cape. The team began playing at provincial level in 2006–07, and in 2015 the South Western Districts Cricket Board joined the Western Cape organisation, moving to join the Cape Cobras franchise.)

During the period of franchise competitions, Western Province, Boland, and South Western Districts continued to compete as separate cricket unions in the CSA 3-Day and One-Day Cups and CSA T20 competitions. The period of franchise competition lasted until the end of the 2020–21 season when Cricket South Africa reverted to a division based provincial competition, with all three teams competing separately from the start of the 2021–22 season. Many of the senior provincial unions which had been involved in franchise competitions retained the names of their franchises as marketing tools. Western Province, the senior team in the Cape Cobras franchise, chose not to do so.

This list includes only the players who played for Cape Cobras between 2003–04 and 2020–21, the period in which franchise cricket operated in South Africa. It includes players who appeared for teams named Western Province Boland in 2003–04 and 2004–05, but not those who played only for Western Province, Boland, or from 2015 to 2016, South Western Districts in provincial competitions during the period, or those who played for Western Province only after the end of franchise competitions in 2020–21.

== A ==
- Ziyaad Abrahams
- HD Ackerman
- Ferisco Adams
- Paul Adams
- Qaasim Adams
- Andrea Agathangelou
- Wallace Albertyn
- Hashim Amla
- Azhar Mahmood

== B ==
- Adam Bacher
- Derrin Bassage
- Temba Bavuma
- David Bedingham
- Jono Bird
- Uwe Birkenstock
- Tladi Bokako
- Corbin Bosch
- Neil Botha
- Johannes Bothma
- Mark Boucher
- Derek Brand
- Nandre Burger

== C ==
- Ryan Canning
- Denver Carolus
- Neil Carter
- Michael Cohen
- Siraaj Conrad

== D ==
- Henry Davids
- Junaid Dawood
- Alan Dawson
- Con de Lange
- Mark de Stadler
- Tony de Zorzi
- Isaac Dikgale
- JP Duminy
- Jean du Plessis
- Willem du Toit

== E ==
- Sybrand Engelbrecht
- Wesley Euley

== F ==
- Clyde Fortuin
- Quinton Friend

== G ==
- Isma-Eel Gafieldien
- Dayyaan Galiem
- John Geoghegan
- Herschelle Gibbs
- Alistair Gray

== H ==
- William Hantam
- Zubayr Hamza
- Ian Harvey
- Benjamin Hector
- Claude Henderson
- Tyron Henderson
- Beuran Hendricks
- Brad Hogg

== J ==
- Petrus Jeftha
- Neil Johnson
- Christiaan Jonker

== K ==
- Jacques Kallis
- Justin Kemp
- Shaheen Khan
- Simon Khomari
- Matthew Kleinveldt
- Rory Kleinveldt
- Hanno Kotze
- Carlos Koyana

== L ==
- Charl Langeveldt
- Eddie Leie
- Richard Levi
- George Linde
- Richard Lotter
- Brendon Louw
- Johann Louw

== M ==
- Siyabonga Mahima
- Andre Malan
- Janneman Malan
- Pieter Malan
- Imraan Manack
- Dyllan Matthews
- Aviwe Mgijima
- Akhona Mnyaka
- Tshepo Moreki
- Mangaliso Mosehle
- Mihlali Mpongwana
- Travis Muller
- Renier Munnik

== N ==
- Mthiwekhaya Nabe
- Sunil Narine
- Tsepo Ndwandwa
- Lesiba Ngoepe
- Mpilo Njoloza
- Thando Ntini
- Onke Nyaku

== O ==
- Mario Olivier
- Justin Ontong

== P ==
- Wayne Parnell
- Dane Paterson
- Hillroy Paulse
- Keegan Petersen
- Robin Peterson
- Vernon Philander
- Dane Piedt
- Francois Plaatjies
- Kieron Pollard
- Ashwell Prince
- Andrew Puttick

== Q ==
- Zakhele Qwabe

== R ==
- Gurshwin Rabie
- Omphile Ramela
- Michael Rippon

== S ==
- Pepler Sandri
- Calvin Savage
- David Schierhout
- Nkululeko Serame
- Owais Shah
- Mthokozisi Shezi
- Siya Simetu
- Kyle Simmonds
- Willem Smit
- Graeme Smith
- Jason Smith
- Dale Steyn
- Gerhard Strydom
- Warren Swan

== T ==
- Roger Telemachus
- Dominic Telo
- Cebo Tshiki
- Thami Tsolekile

== V ==
- Yaseen Vallie
- Lenert van Wyk
- Stiaan van Zyl
- Kyle Verreynne
- Dane Vilas

== W ==
- Tayo Walbrugh
- Martin Walters
- Ben Ward
- Lizaad Williams
- Charl Willoughby
- Warren Wyngaard

== Y ==
- Brendan Young

== Z ==
- Monde Zondeki
