= John de Villiers =

John de Villiers may refer to:

- John de Villiers, 1st Baron de Villiers (1842–1914), Cape lawyer and judge
- John de Villiers (cricketer, born 1930) (1930–1969), South African cricketer
- John de Villiers (cricketer, born 1956) (born 1956), South African cricketer
