= Basson =

Basson is a French surname, and means Bass. Notable people with the name include:

- Adriaan Basson, South African journalist
- Alaric Basson (born 1996), South African swimmer
- Annali Basson (born 1960), South African judge
- Bertus Basson (born 1979), South African chef
- Bjorn Basson (born 1987), South African rugby union player
- Christiaan Basson (born 1982), South African professional golfer
- Corne Basson (born 1967), South African sport shooter
- De Wet Basson, South African professional golfer
- Gustav Basson (born 1996), South African cyclist
- Hendrik Basson (born 1952), South African cricketer
- Japie Basson (1918–2012), South African apartheid politician
- Jean Basson (born 1987), South African swimmer
- Joyce Basson, South African politician
- Juliet Basson, South African politician
- Justin Basson (born 1994), South African rugby union player
- Leon Basson (born 1960), South African politician
- Lucia Basson (born 1953), Namibian politician
- Michael Basson (born 1958), South African cricketer
- Moshe Basson (born 1950), Israeli chef
- Pierre Basson (1880–1906), South African serial killer
- Sébastien Basson (c. 1573–1625), French physician and natural philosopher
- Whitey Basson (born 1946), South African businessman
- Wium Basson (1975–2001), South African rugby union footballer
- Wouter Basson (born 1950), South African cardiologist and chemical and biological weapons researcher

== See also ==
- Bason
