= Leslie Kets =

South African cricketer (born 1959)

Personal information
- Born: 3 April 1959 (age 67); Johannesburg, South Africa
- Source: Cricinfo, 1 December 2020

Leslie Kets (born 3 April 1959) is a South African cricketer. He played in twelve first-class and four List A matches for Boland in 1982/83 and 1985/86.

== See also ==
- List of Boland representative cricketers
