= Stuart Hockly =

South African cricketer (born 1973)

Personal information
- Born: 9 April 1973 (age 53); Empangeni, South Africa
- Source: Cricinfo, 1 December 2020

Stuart Hockly (born 9 April 1973) is a South African cricketer. He played in three first-class matches for Boland in 1994/95.

== See also ==
- List of Boland representative cricketers
