= Essias van Rooyen =

South African cricketer (born 1960)

Personal information
- Born: 27 March 1960 (age 66); Cape Town, South Africa
- Source: Cricinfo, 1 December 2020

Essias van Rooyen (born 27 March 1960) is a South African cricketer. He played in ten first-class and six List A matches for Boland from 1980/81 to 1988/89.

== See also ==
- List of Boland representative cricketers
