= Henri Fourie =

South African cricketer (born 1979)

Personal information
- Born: 13 April 1979 (age 47); Ermele, South Africa
- Source: Cricinfo, 1 December 2020

Henri Fourie (born 13 April 1979) is a South African cricketer. He played in three first-class and five List A matches for Boland in 2004 and 2005.

== See also ==
- List of Boland representative cricketers
