= Jacobus Barnard =

South African cricketer (born 1967)

Personal information
- Born: 24 February 1967 (age 59); Paarl, South Africa
- Source: Cricinfo, 1 December 2020

Jacobus Barnard (born 24 February 1967) is a South African cricketer. He played in four first-class matches for Boland in 1989/90 and 1990/91.

== See also ==
- List of Boland representative cricketers
