= Francois Geldenhuys =

South African cricketer (born 1982)

Personal information
- Born: 31 December 1982 (age 43); Pietersburg, South Africa
- Source: Cricinfo, 1 December 2020

Francois Geldenhuys (born 31 December 1982) is a South African cricketer. He played in one first-class and one List A match for Boland in 2006.

== See also ==
- List of Boland representative cricketers
