= Eldred Kasner =

South African cricketer (1941–2017)

Personal information
- Born: 2 September 1941; Paarl, South Africa
- Died: 1 May 2017 (aged 75)
- Source: Cricinfo, 1 December 2020

Eldred Kasner (2 September 1941 – 1 May 2017) was a South African cricketer. He played in two first-class matches for Boland in 1980/81.

== See also ==
- List of Boland representative cricketers
