= Nikolaus Schneider =

German bishop (born 1947)

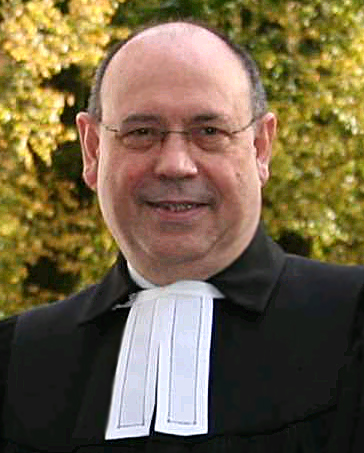
Nikolaus Schneider

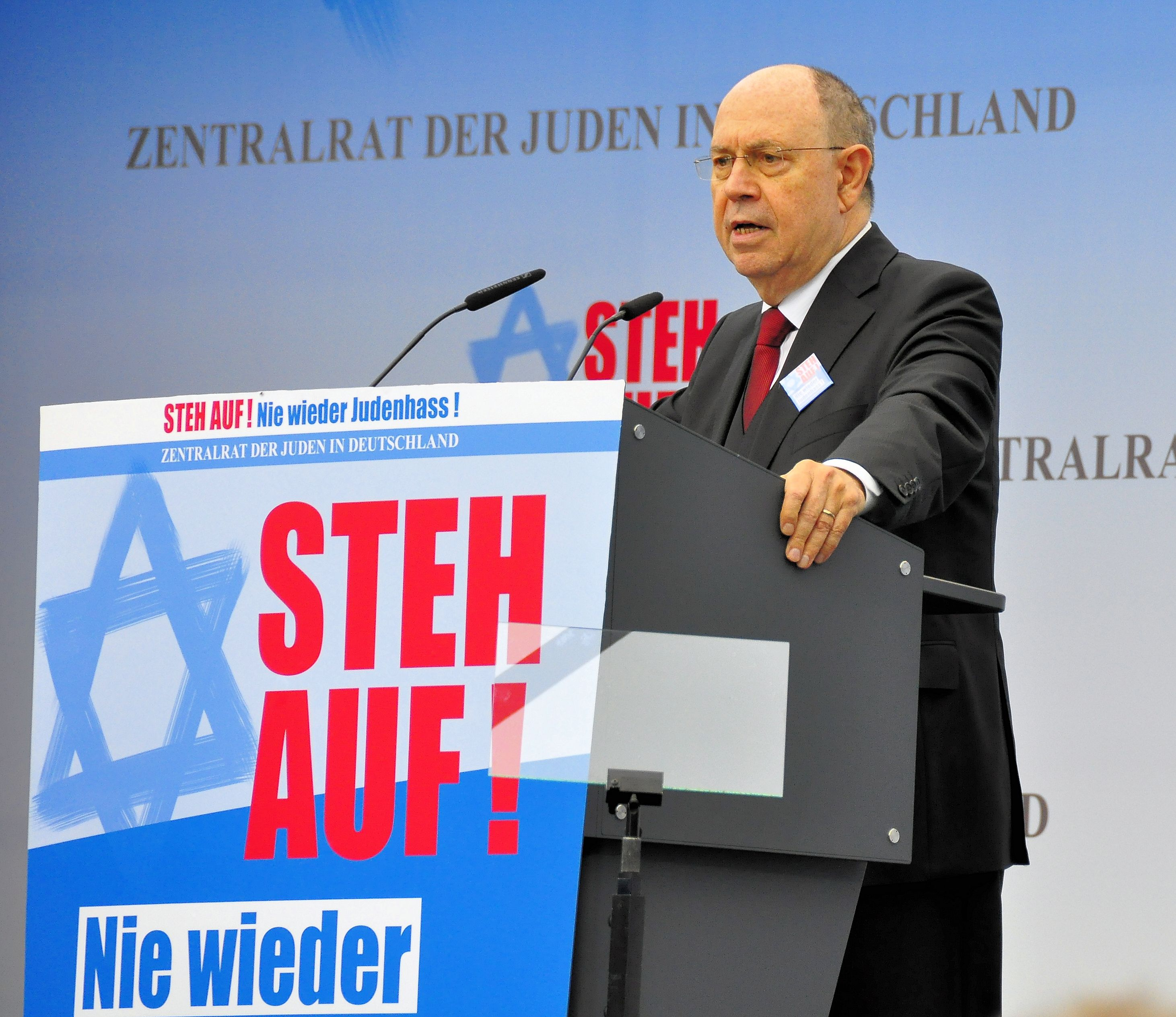
Nikolaus Schneider addressing a rally against anti-Semitism in Berlin, September 2014

Nikolaus Schneider (born 3 September 1947) was from 9 November 2010 to 10 November 2014 president of the council of the Evangelical Church in Germany (EKD).

== Life ==
Born in Duisburg, Schneider studied in Wuppertal, Göttingen and Münster and was ordained on 14 November 1976. He was vice-praeses of the synod of the Evangelical Church in the Rhineland (EKiR) and succeeded in 2003 Manfred Kock as praeses of the EKiR until in 2013 Manfred Rekowski was elected his successor due to Schneider's pensioning. Since Margot Käßmann's resignation in February 2010, Schneider was acting president of the council of the EKD and was elected president on 9 November 2010. On 30 June 2014 he announced his resignation as president and member of the council due to severe sickness of his wife, taking effect on 10 November 2014. Between 1998 and 2003 he served as praeses of the synod of the Evangelical Church of the Union, a position in which he had also succeeded Kock.
