= Raymond Bath =

South African cricketer (born 1944)

Personal information
- Full name: Raymond Henry Bath
- Born: 4 May 1944; Worcester, South Africa
- Died: 15 May 2024 (aged 80)
- Batting: Right-handed

Domestic team information
- Years: Team
- 1980/81: Border
- Source: Cricinfo, 1 December 2020

Raymond Henry Bath (4 May 1944 – 15 May 2024) was a South African cricketer. He played in two first-class matches for Boland in 1980/81.

== See also ==
- List of Boland representative cricketers
