= Casper van der Merwe =

South African cricketer (born 1946)

Personal information
- Born: 8 December 1946 (age 79); Piketberg, South Africa
- Source: Cricinfo, 1 December 2020

Casper van der Merwe (born 8 December 1946) is a South African cricketer. He played in thirteen first-class and three List A matches for Boland from 1980/81 to 1982/83.

== See also ==
- List of Boland representative cricketers
