= Elton Williams =

Elton Williams can refer to:

- Elton Williams (cricketer) (born 1973), South African cricketer
- Elton Williams (footballer) (born 1973), Montserratian footballer
