= Francois Moolman =

South African cricketer (born 1951)

Personal information
- Born: 2 April 1951 (age 75); Cape Town, South Africa
- Source: Cricinfo, 1 December 2020

Francois Moolman (born 2 April 1951) is a South African cricketer. He played in one first-class match for Boland in 1980/81.

== See also ==
- List of Boland representative cricketers
