= John Villet (cricketer) =

South African cricketer (born 1973)

Personal information
- Born: 8 September 1973 (age 53); Bellville, South Africa
- Source: Cricinfo, 1 December 2020

John Villet (born 8 September 1973) is a South African cricketer. He played in nine first-class and six List A matches for Boland in 1994/95 and 1995/96.

== See also ==
- List of Boland representative cricketers
