= Bredell =

Bredell is a surname. Notable people with the surname include:

- Anton Bredell (born 1965), South African politician
- Elwood Bredell (1884–1976), British cinematographer and actor
- Mark Bredell (born 1972), South African cricketer
