= Johannes van Rensburg (cricketer) =

South African cricketer (born 1962)

Personal information
- Born: 20 November 1962 (age 63); Parow, South Africa
- Source: Cricinfo, 1 December 2020

Johannes van Rensburg (born 20 November 1962) is a South African cricketer. He played in two first-class matches for Boland in 1988/89.

== See also ==
- List of Boland representative cricketers
