= Leon Roberts (cricketer) =

South African cricketer (born 1956)

Personal information
- Born: 30 April 1956 (age 70); Stellenbosch, South Africa
- Source: Cricinfo, 1 December 2020

Leon Roberts (born 30 April 1956) is a South African former cricketer. He played in twelve first-class matches for Boland from 1980/81 to 1985/86.

== See also ==
- List of Boland representative cricketers
