= Morne de Vries =

South African cricketer (born 1984)

Personal information
- Born: 7 May 1984 (age 42); Wellington, South Africa
- Source: Cricinfo, 1 December 2020

Morne de Vries (born 7 May 1984) is a South African former cricketer. He played in two List A matches for Boland in 2009 and 2010.

== See also ==
- List of Boland representative cricketers
