= Anthonie Potgieter =

South African cricketer (born 1958)

Personal information
- Born: 26 December 1958 (age 67); Kimberley, South Africa
- Source: Cricinfo, 1 December 2020

Anthonie Potgieter (born 26 December 1958) is a South African cricketer. He played in two first-class matches for Boland in 1980/81.

== See also ==
- List of Boland representative cricketers
