= Jacques Wahl =

South African cricketer (born 1971)

Personal information
- Born: 26 February 1971 (age 55); Cape Town, South Africa
- Source: Cricinfo, 1 December 2020

Jacques Wahl (born 26 February 1971) is a South African cricketer. He played in three first-class matches for Boland in 1993/94.

== See also ==
- List of Boland representative cricketers
