= Zurich Muller =

South African cricketer (born 1972)

Personal information
- Born: 1 May 1972 (age 54); Paarl, South Africa
- Source: Cricinfo, 1 December 2020

Zurich Muller (born 1 May 1972) is a South African cricketer. He played in one List A match for Boland in 1995/96.

== See also ==
- List of Boland representative cricketers
