= Zaheer Lorgat =

South African cricketer (born 1986)

Personal information
- Full name: Mohamed Zaheer Lorgat
- Born: 23 January 1986 (age 40); Port Elizabeth, South Africa
- Source: Cricinfo, 1 December 2020

Zaheer Lorgat (born 23 January 1986) is a South African cricketer. He played in three first-class, eight List A, and sixteen Twenty20 matches for Boland from 2013 to 2015.

== See also ==
- List of Boland representative cricketers
