= Erasmus Hendrikse =

South African cricketer (born 1979)

Personal information
- Born: 14 December 1979 (age 46); Grahamstown, South Africa
- Source: Cricinfo, 1 December 2020

Erasmus Hendrikse (born 14 December 1979) is a South African former cricketer. He played in four first-class and five List A matches for Boland in 2003 and 2004.

== See also ==
- List of Boland representative cricketers
