= Ockert Douglas =

South African cricketer (born 1966)

Personal information
- Born: 27 July 1966 (age 60); Paarl, South Africa
- Source: Cricinfo, 1 December 2020

Ockert Douglas (born 27 July 1966) is a South African cricketer. He played in two first-class matches for Boland in 1989/90.

== See also ==
- List of Boland representative cricketers
