= Bryan Drew =

South African cricketer (born 1971)

Personal information
- Born: 23 January 1971 (age 55); Durban, South Africa
- Source: Cricinfo, 1 December 2020

Bryan Drew (born 23 January 1971) is a South African cricketer. He played in nineteen first-class and two List A matches for Boland from 1992/93 and 1998/99.

== See also ==
- List of Boland representative cricketers
