= Justin Wiggill =

South African cricketer (born 1975)

Personal information
- Born: 22 June 1975 (age 51); East London, South Africa
- Source: Cricinfo, 1 December 2020

Justin Wiggill (born 22 June 1975) is a South African cricketer. He played in three first-class matches for Boland from 1995/96 to 1997/98.

== See also ==
- List of Boland representative cricketers
