= Marius La Grange =

South African cricketer (born 1964)

Personal information
- Born: 30 September 1964 (age 62); Paarl, South Africa
- Source: Cricinfo, 1 December 2020

Marius La Grange (born 30 September 1964) is a South African cricketer. He played in one List A and eight first-class matches for Boland in 1986/87 and 1987/88.

== See also ==
- List of Boland representative cricketers
