= Andrew Wylie (cricketer) =

South African cricketer (born 1971)

Personal information
- Born: 31 December 1971 (age 54); Pietermaritzburg, South Africa
- Batting: Right handed
- Bowling: Right Arm Medium
- Source: Cricinfo, 1 December 2020

Andrew Wylie (born 31 December 1971) is a South African cricketer. He played in 23 first-class and 28 List A matches for Boland from 1992/93 to 1997/98. He was the former director of cricket at Wynberg boys’ high school and is now Head of Cricket at Norwich School.

== See also ==
- List of Boland representative cricketers
