= Solomon Barnard =

South African cricketer (born 1956)

Personal information
- Born: 14 February 1956 (age 70); Malmesbury, South Africa
- Source: Cricinfo, 1 December 2020

Solomon Barnard (born 14 February 1956) is a South African cricketer. He played in twelve first-class matches for Boland from 1981/82 to 1983/84.

== See also ==
- List of Boland representative cricketers
