= Paul Wallace (South African cricketer) =

South African cricketer (born 1957)

Personal information
- Born: 2 January 1957 (age 69); Cape Town, South Africa
- Source: Cricinfo, 1 December 2020

Paul Wallace (born 2 January 1957) is a South African cricketer. He played in one List A and four first-class matches for Boland in 1980/81.

== See also ==
- List of Boland representative cricketers
