= Richard Smith (South African cricketer) =

South African cricketer (born 1972)

Personal information
- Born: 10 October 1972 (age 54); Bellville, South Africa
- Source: Cricinfo, 1 December 2020

Richard Smith (born 10 October 1972) is a South African cricketer. He played in six first-class matches for Boland from 1994/95 to 1995/96.

== See also ==
- List of Boland representative cricketers
