= CWI/WIPA Awards =

West Indies cricket awards

The CWI/WIPA Awards are a set of annual cricket awards given jointly by the Cricket West Indies (CWI) and the West Indies Players' Association (WIPA). The awards recognise and honour the best West Indian international and domestic cricketers of the past season. The awards were known as WIPA Awards until 2013 when the CWI, then known as West Indies Cricket Board (WICB), and WIPA decided to jointly host the awards function.

== History ==
The West Indies Players' Association (WIPA) started the WIPA Awards in 2004, with First Citizens Bank as its title sponsor. The awards were called "First Citizens WIPA Awards" for the first nine years, after which WIPA and the West Indies Cricket Board (WICB) agreed to jointly organize and fund the awards with the function being renamed as "WICB/WIPA Awards". After West Indies Cricket Board was renamed as Cricket West Indies, the awards have come to be known as "CWI/WIPA Awards".

The winners of the awards are selected by a panel of judges which mainly consists of eminent former cricketers from the West Indies. The panel of judges for the inaugural awards in 2004 included Ian Bishop, Joey Carew, Tony Cozier, Gordon Greenidge, Gus Logie, Vivian Richards and Ricky Skerritt.

Brian Lara won the first ever WIPA Player of the Year Award in 2004 and went on to win it the following two years as well to complete a hat-trick. Apart from Lara, three cricketers have won the award more than once: Shivnarine Chanderpaul (2008 and 2009), Chris Gayle (2007 and 2011) and Marlon Samuels (2013 and 2016). Chanderpaul has won the Test Player of the Year award four times (2008, 2009, 2013 and 2014), the most by any player, while the ODI Player of the Year has been won twice each by Chanderpaul, Gayle and Samuels. The T20I Player of the Year award was introduced in 2010 and only Sunil Narine has won it more than once (in 2013 and 2014).

The only award in women's cricket, Women's Player of the Year, has been won by Stafanie Taylor for a record nine times, including eight wins in succession from 2009 to 2016.

== List of winners ==
=== WIPA Awards ===
==== 2004 ====
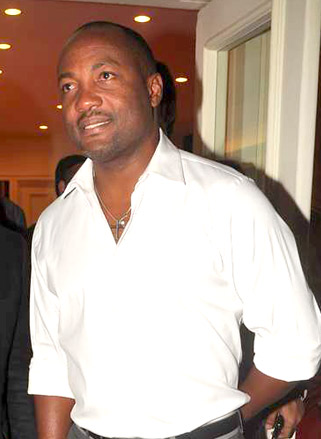
From 2004 to 2006, Brian Lara won the Player of the Year award thrice and Test Player of the Year award twice.

The awards function was held on 17 March 2004 in Port of Spain, Trinidad and Tobago.

- Player of the Year: Brian Lara
- Regional Four Day Player of the Year: Tino Best
- Under-19 Player of the Year: Ravi Rampaul

==== 2005 ====
The awards function was held on 31 May 2005 in Kingston, Jamaica.

- Player of the Year: Brian Lara
- Test Player of the Year: Brian Lara
- ODI Player of the Year: Chris Gayle
- Emerging Player of the Year: Dwayne Bravo
- Regional Four Day Team of the Year: Barbados
- Under-19 Team of the Year: Jamaica
- Regional Four Day Player of the Year: Devon Smith
- Under-19 Player of the Year: Xavier Marshall

==== 2006 ====
The awards function was held on 24 May 2006 in Port of Spain, Trinidad and Tobago.

- Player of the Year: Brian Lara
- Test Player of the Year: Brian Lara
- ODI Player of the Year: Ian Bradshaw
- Emerging Player of the Year: Denesh Ramdin
- Women's Player of the Year: Pamela Lavine
- Regional Four Day Team of the Year: Guyana
- Under-19 Team of the Year: Trinidad and Tobago
- Under-15 Team of the Year: Trinidad and Tobago
- Regional Four Day Player of the Year: Ridley Jacobs
- Regional 50-over Player of the Year: Ramnaresh Sarwan
- Under-19 Player of the Year: Sunil Narine
- Under-15 Player of the Year: Adrian Barath

==== 2007 ====
The awards function was held on 12 February 2007 in Bridgetown, Barbados.

- Player of the Year: Chris Gayle
- Test Player of the Year: Daren Ganga
- ODI Player of the Year: Ramnaresh Sarwan
- Emerging Player of the Year: Jerome Taylor
- Women's Player of the Year: Stafanie Taylor
- Regional Four Day Team of the Year: Trinidad and Tobago
- Under-19 Team of the Year: Guyana
- Regional Four Day Player of the Year: Ryan Hinds
- Regional 50-over Player of the Year: Kieron Pollard
- Under-19 Player of the Year: Veerasammy Permaul

==== 2008 ====
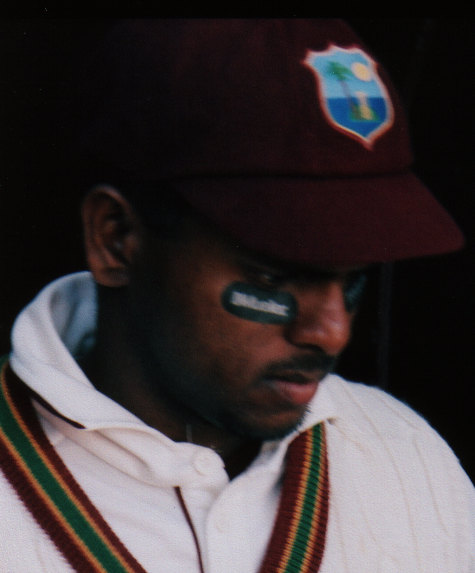
Shivnarine Chanderpaul won all three major awards in 2008.

The awards function was held on 30 March 2008 in Port of Spain, Trinidad and Tobago.

- Player of the Year: Shivnarine Chanderpaul
- Test Player of the Year: Shivnarine Chanderpaul
- ODI Player of the Year: Shivnarine Chanderpaul
- Emerging Player of the Year: Adrian Barath
- Women's Player of the Year: Stacy-Ann King
- Regional Four Day Team of the Year: Trinidad and Tobago
- Under-19 Team of the Year: Guyana
- Regional Four Day Player of the Year: Daren Ganga
- Regional 50-over Player of the Year: Shawn Findlay
- Under-19 Player of the Year: Shamarh Brooks

==== 2009 ====
The awards function was held on 12 March 2009 in Port of Spain, Trinidad and Tobago.

- Player of the Year: Shivnarine Chanderpaul
- Test Player of the Year: Shivnarine Chanderpaul
- ODI Player of the Year: Chris Gayle
- Emerging Player of the Year: Brendan Nash
- Women's Player of the Year: Stafanie Taylor
- Regional Four Day Team of the Year: Jamaica
- Under-19 Team of the Year: Barbados
- Regional Four Day Player of the Year: Nikita Miller
- Regional 50-over Player of the Year: Kieron Pollard
- Caribbean Twenty20 Player of the Year: Dave Mohammed
- Under-19 Player of the Year: Keron Cottoy

==== 2010 ====
The awards function was held on 8 June 2010 in Port of Spain, Trinidad and Tobago.

- Player of the Year: Ramnaresh Sarwan
- Test Player of the Year: Ramnaresh Sarwan
- ODI Player of the Year: Shivnarine Chanderpaul
- T20I Player of the Year: Dwayne Bravo
- Emerging Player of the Year: Kemar Roach
- Women's Player of the Year: Stafanie Taylor
- Regional Four Day Team of the Year: Trinidad and Tobago
- Under-19 Team of the Year: Jamaica
- Regional Four Day Player of the Year: Narsingh Deonarine
- Regional 50-over Player of the Year: Daren Ganga
- Caribbean Twenty20 Player of the Year: Darren Bravo
- Under-19 Player of the Year: Akeem Dewar

==== 2011 ====
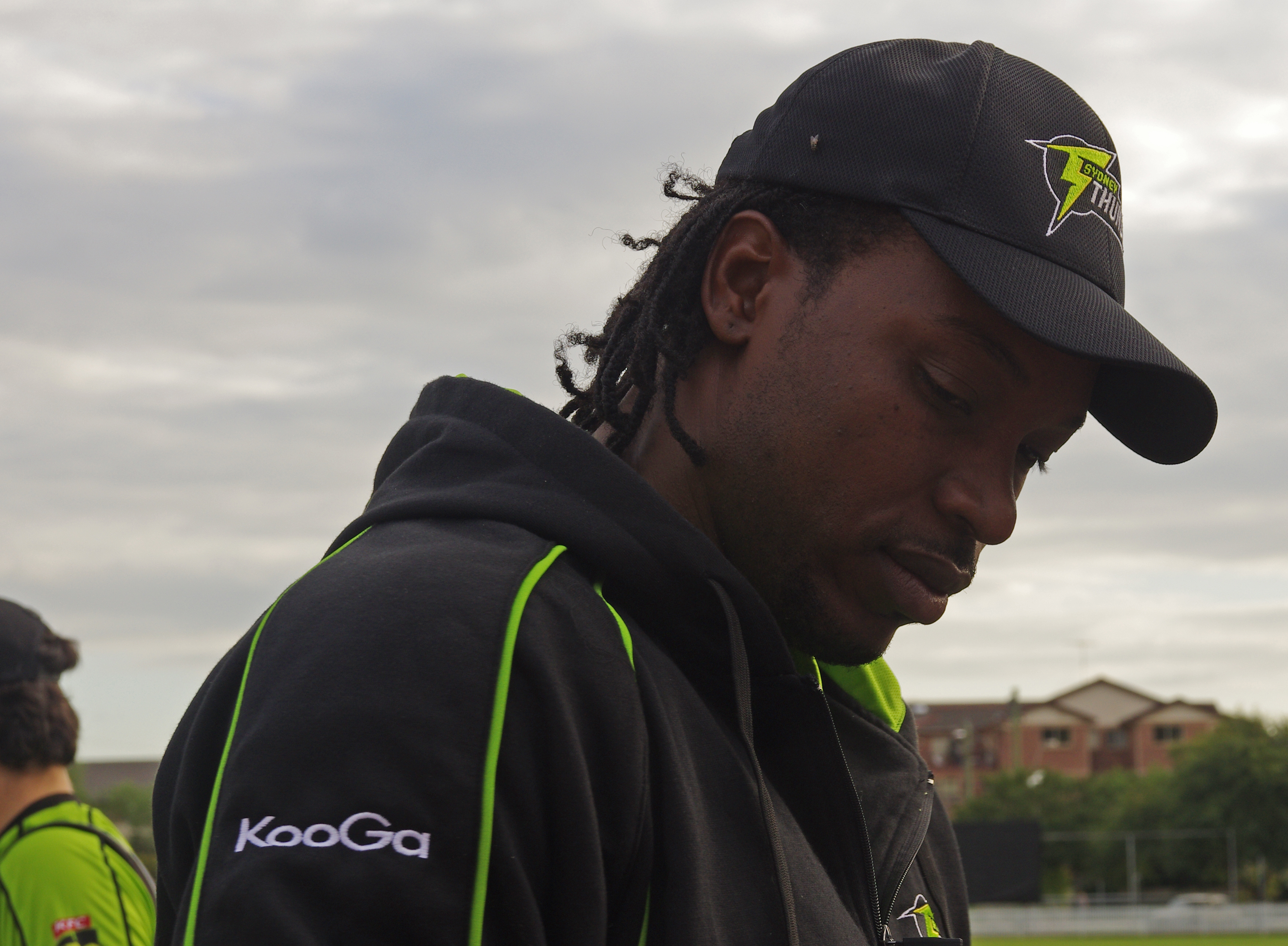
Chris Gayle won his second Player of the Year award in 2011.

The awards function was held on 5 June 2011 in Port of Spain, Trinidad and Tobago.

- Player of the Year: Chris Gayle
- Test Player of the Year: Chris Gayle
- ODI Player of the Year: Kieron Pollard
- T20I Player of the Year: Darren Sammy
- Emerging Player of the Year: Darren Bravo
- Women's Player of the Year: Stafanie Taylor
- Regional Four Day Team of the Year: Jamaica
- Under-19 Team of the Year: Windward Islands
- Regional Four Day Player of the Year: Imran Khan
- Regional 50-over Player of the Year: Kirk Edwards
- Caribbean Twenty20 Player of the Year: Devendra Bishoo
- Under-19 Player of the Year: Keiron Joseph

==== 2012 ====
The awards function was held on 13 April 2012 in Port of Spain, Trinidad and Tobago.

- Player of the Year: Devendra Bishoo
- Test Player of the Year: Devendra Bishoo
- ODI Player of the Year: Andre Russell
- T20I Player of the Year: Lendl Simmons
- Emerging Player of the Year: Kirk Edwards
- Women's Player of the Year: Stafanie Taylor
- Regional Four Day Team of the Year: Jamaica
- Under-19 Team of the Year: Jamaica
- Regional Four Day Player of the Year: Marlon Samuels
- Regional 50-over Player of the Year: Sunil Narine
- Caribbean Twenty20 Player of the Year: Lendl Simmons
- Under-19 Player of the Year: Derone Davis

=== WICB/WIPA Awards ===
==== 2013 ====
The awards function was held on 4 July 2013 in Port of Spain, Trinidad and Tobago.

- Player of the Year: Marlon Samuels
- Test Player of the Year: Shivnarine Chanderpaul
- ODI Player of the Year: Marlon Samuels
- T20I Player of the Year: Sunil Narine
- Emerging Player of the Year: Kieran Powell
- Women's Player of the Year: Stafanie Taylor
- WICB Lifetime Achievement Award: John Hendricks
- WIPA Lifetime Achievement Award: Winston Reid
- Regional Four Day Team of the Year: Jamaica
- Under-19 Team of the Year: Barbados
- Regional Four Day Player of the Year: Nikita Miller
- Regional 50-over Player of the Year: Sunil Narine
- Caribbean Twenty20 Player of the Year: Krishmar Santokie
- Under-19 Player of the Year: Jeremy Solozano

==== 2014 ====
The awards function was held on 5 June 2014 in Kingston, Jamaica.

- Player of the Year: Darren Bravo
- Test Player of the Year: Shivnarine Chanderpaul
- ODI Player of the Year: Dwayne Bravo
- T20I Player of the Year: Sunil Narine
- Emerging Player of the Year: Miguel Cummins
- Women's Player of the Year: Stafanie Taylor
- WICB Lifetime Achievement Award: Teddy Griffith
- WIPA Lifetime Achievement Award: Lockhart Sebastien
- Regional Four Day Team of the Year: Trinidad and Tobago
- Under-19 Team of the Year: Jamaica
- Regional Four Day Player of the Year: Nikita Miller
- Regional 50-over Player of the Year: Shane Shillingford
- Twenty20 Player of the Year: Darren Bravo
- Under-19 Player of the Year: Tagenarine Chanderpaul

==== 2015 ====
The awards function was held on 9 June 2015 in Kingston, Jamaica.

- Player of the Year: Sulieman Benn
- Test Player of the Year: Kraigg Brathwaite
- ODI Player of the Year: Denesh Ramdin
- T20I Player of the Year: Samuel Badree
- Emerging Player of the Year: Jermaine Blackwood
- Women's Player of the Year: Stafanie Taylor
- WICB Lifetime Achievement Award: Chetram Singh
- WIPA Lifetime Achievement Award: Renford Pinnock
- Regional Four Day Team of the Year: Barbados
- Under-19 Team of the Year: Guyana
- Regional Four Day Player of the Year: Shacaya Thomas
- Regional 50-over Player of the Year: Dwayne Smith
- Twenty20 Player of the Year: Lendl Simmons
- Under-19 Player of the Year: Shimron Hetmyer

==== 2016 ====
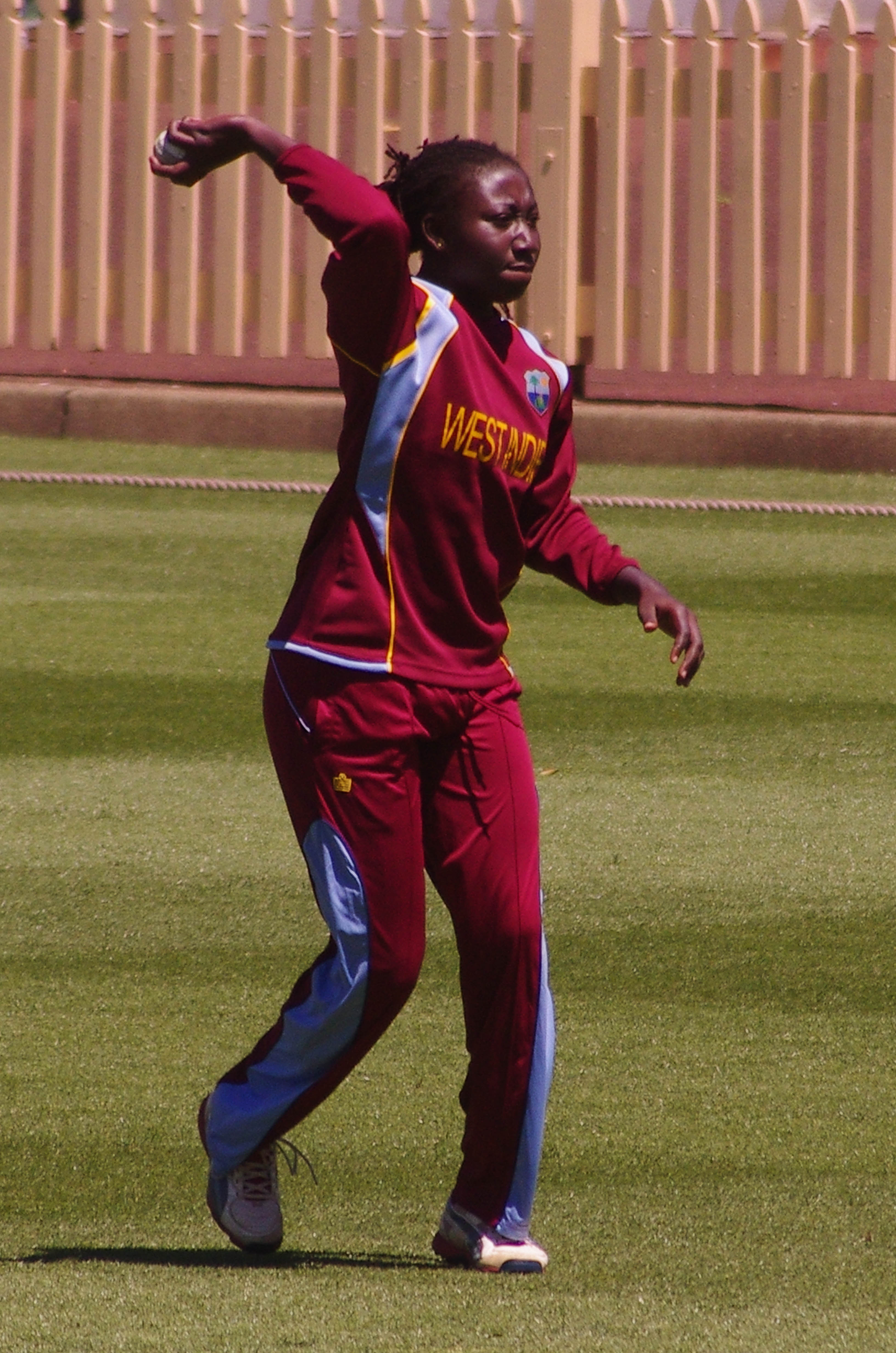
Stafanie Taylor won the Women's Player of the Year for the eighth successive year in 2016.

The awards function was held on 19 July 2016 in St. John's, Antigua and Barbuda.

- Player of the Year: Marlon Samuels
- Test Player of the Year: Darren Bravo
- ODI Player of the Year: Marlon Samuels
- T20I Player of the Year: Chris Gayle
- Emerging Player of the Year: Jomel Warrican
- Women's Player of the Year: Stafanie Taylor
- WICB Lifetime Achievement Award: Clarvis Joseph
- WIPA Lifetime Achievement Award: Ralston Otto
- Regional Four Day Team of the Year: Guyana
- Under-19 Team of the Year: Guyana
- Regional Four Day Player of the Year: Veerasammy Permaul
- Regional 50-over Player of the Year: Jason Mohammed
- Twenty20 Player of the Year: Dwayne Bravo
- Under-19 Player of the Year: Shimron Hetmyer

=== CWI/WIPA Awards ===
==== 2017 ====
The awards function was held on 7 July 2017 in Kingston, Jamaica.

- Player of the Year: Roston Chase
- Test Player of the Year: Roston Chase
- ODI Player of the Year: Jason Holder
- T20I Player of the Year: Andre Russell
- Emerging Player of the Year: Roston Chase
- Women's Player of the Year: Stafanie Taylor
- Women's ODI Player of the Year: Stafanie Taylor
- Women's T20I Player of the Year: Stafanie Taylor
- CWI Lifetime Achievement Award: Walter Eden St John
- WIPA Lifetime Achievement Award: Cleveland Davidson
- Regional Four Day Team of the Year: Guyana
- Under-19 Team of the Year: Guyana
- Regional Four Day Player of the Year: Roston Chase
- Regional 50-over Player of the Year: Ashley Nurse
- Twenty20 Player of the Year: Dwayne Bravo
- Under-19 Player of the Year: Joshua Bishop
- WIPA in the Community award: Kameah Cooper
- Windies Foundation Award: The Chris Gayle Foundation

==== 2018 ====
The awards function was held on 20 June 2018 in Bridgetown, Barbados.

- Player of the Year: Shai Hope
- Test Player of the Year: Shai Hope
- ODI Player of the Year: Shai Hope
- T20I Player of the Year: Evin Lewis
- Emerging Player of the Year: Keemo Paul
- Women's Player of the Year: Stafanie Taylor
- Women's ODI Player of the Year: Stafanie Taylor
- Women's T20I Player of the Year: Deandra Dottin
- CWI Lifetime Achievement Award: Carol Whilby-Maxwell
- WIPA Lifetime Achievement Award: Dawnley Joseph
- Regional Four Day Team of the Year: Guyana
- Under-19 Team of the Year: Guyana
- Regional Four Day Player of the Year: Devon Smith
- Regional 50-over Player of the Year: Roston Chase
- Twenty20 Player of the Year: Chadwick Walton
- Under-19 Player of the Year: Kirstan Kallicharan
- WIPA in the Community award: Rodney Sieunarine
- Windies Foundation Award: The Marlon Samuels Foundation
- Umpire of the Year: Joel Wilson
