= Daniel Malan (cricketer) =

South African cricketer (born 1948)

Personal information
- Born: 14 December 1948 (age 77); Paarl, South Africa
- Source: Cricinfo, 1 December 2020

Daniel Malan (born 14 December 1948) is a South African cricketer. He played in one List A and four first-class matches for Boland in 1980/81 and 1981/82.

== See also ==
- List of Boland representative cricketers
