= Wayne van As =

South African cricketer (born 1968)

Personal information
- Born: 27 February 1968 (age 58); Bulawayo, Rhodesia
- Source: Cricinfo, 1 December 2020

Wayne van As (born 27 February 1968) is a South African cricketer. He played in sixteen first-class and six List A matches for Boland from 1991/92 to 1994/95.

== See also ==
- List of Boland representative cricketers
