= Matthys Lotz =

South African cricketer (born 1965)

Personal information
- Born: 8 May 1965 (age 61); Cape Town, South Africa
- Source: Cricinfo, 1 December 2020

Matthys Lotz (born 8 May 1965) is a South African cricketer. He played in three first-class matches for Boland in 1989/90 and 1990/91.

== See also ==
- List of Boland representative cricketers
