= Denys Hobson (cricketer, born 1983) =

South African cricketer (born 1983)

Personal information
- Born: 21 April 1983 (age 43); Jansenville, South Africa
- Source: Cricinfo, 1 December 2020

Denys Hobson (born 21 April 1983) is a South African cricketer. He played in one first-class and one List A match for Boland in 2006.

== See also ==
- List of Boland representative cricketers
