= Jodi Myers =

South African cricketer (born 1973)

Personal information
- Born: 6 September 1973 (age 53); Cape Town, South Africa
- Source: Cricinfo, 1 December 2020

Jodi Myers (born 6 September 1973) is a South African cricketer. He played in three first-class matches for Boland from 1994/95 to 1996/97.

== See also ==
- List of Boland representative cricketers
