= Tennyson Botes =

South African cricketer (born 1988)

Personal information
- Born: 16 August 1988 (age 38); East London, South Africa
- Source: Cricinfo, 1 December 2020

Tennyson Botes (born 16 August 1988) is a South African cricketer. He played in three first-class matches for Boland in 2007.

== See also ==
- List of Boland representative cricketers
