= Gabriel Botha =

South African cricketer (born 1962)

Personal information
- Born: 23 March 1962 (age 64); Johannesburg, South Africa
- Source: Cricinfo, 1 December 2020

Gabriel Botha (born 23 March 1962) is a South African cricketer. He played in two first-class matches for Boland in 1990/91.

== See also ==
- List of Boland representative cricketers
