= Winston Fortuin =

South African cricketer (born 1975)

Personal information
- Born: 8 March 1975 (age 51); Paarl, South Africa
- Source: Cricinfo, 1 December 2020

Winston Fortuin (born 8 March 1975) is a South African cricketer. He played in three first-class matches for Boland in 1995/96.

== See also ==
- List of Boland representative cricketers
