= Germishuys =

Germishuys is a surname. Notable people with the surname include:

- Gerrie Germishuys (born 1949), South African rugby union player
- Hanco Germishuys (born 1996), South African born American rugby union player
- Ross Geldenhuys (born 1983), South African rugby union player
- Deon Germishuys (born 1999), South African professional golfer
- Gerrie Germishuys (born 1949), South African rugby union player
- Louis-Marc Germishuys (born 1967), South African cricketer
