= Marc Pina =

South African cricketer (born 1961)

Personal information
- Born: 10 May 1961 (age 65); Cape Town, South Africa
- Source: Cricinfo, 1 December 2020

Marc Pina (born 10 May 1961) is a South African cricketer. He played in three first-class matches for Boland from 1987/88 to 1990/91.

== See also ==
- List of Boland representative cricketers
