= Warren Hayward =

South African cricketer (born 1984)

Personal information
- Born: 15 May 1984 (age 42); Johannesburg, South Africa
- Source: Cricinfo, 1 December 2020

Warren Hayward (born 15 May 1984) is a South African cricketer. He played in ten first-class and seven List A matches for Boland from 2005 to 2008.

== See also ==
- List of Boland representative cricketers
