= Elmar Liebenberg =

South African cricketer (born 1973)

Personal information
- Born: 28 March 1973 (age 53); Paarl, South Africa
- Source: Cricinfo, 1 December 2020

Elmar Liebenberg (born 28 March 1973) is a South African cricketer. He played in four first-class matches for Boland in 1995/96 and 1996/97.

== See also ==
- List of Boland representative cricketers
