= Jacob Taljaard =

South African cricketer (born 1965)

Personal information
- Born: 18 August 1965 (age 61); Cape Town, South Africa
- Source: Cricinfo, 1 December 2020

Jacob Taljaard (born 18 August 1965) is a South African cricketer. He played in one first-class and four List A matches for Boland between 1986/87 and 1990/91.

== See also ==
- List of Boland representative cricketers
