= Stuart White =

Stuart White may refer to:

- Stuart White (cricketer)
- Stuart White (educator)
- Stuart White (racing driver)
- Stuart White (sound engineer)
