= Jonathan Mackey =

South African cricketer (born 1977)

Personal information
- Born: 1 June 1977 (age 49); Durban, South Africa
- Source: Cricinfo, 1 December 2020

Jonathan Mackey (born 1 June 1977) is a South African cricketer. He played in two first-class and two List A matches for Boland in 1997/98.

== See also ==
- List of Boland representative cricketers
