= Herman Venter =

South African cricketer (born 1975)

Personal information
- Born: 25 August 1975 (age 51); Roodepoort, South Africa
- Source: Cricinfo, 1 December 2020

Herman Venter (born 25 August 1975) is a South African cricketer. He played in one first-class match for Boland in 2007.

== See also ==
- List of Boland representative cricketers
