= Barry Richards (disambiguation) =

Barry Richards (born 1945) is a South African former first-class cricketer.

Barry Richards may also refer to:

- Barry Richards (Boland cricketer), South African cricketer for Boland
- Barry "The Reazar" Richards (born 1942), American radio/television personality
- Barry Richards or Dancing Barry (born c. 1950), entertainer at National Basketball Association games

== See also ==
- Barry Richard (born 1942), American politician
