= Schoeman Botha =

South African cricketer (born 1964)

Personal information
- Born: 2 June 1964 (age 62); Uitenhage, South Africa
- Source: Cricinfo, 1 December 2020

Schoeman Botha (born 2 June 1964) is a South African former cricketer. He played in two first-class and two List A matches for Boland in 1988/89.

== See also ==
- List of Boland representative cricketers
