= Sarel =

Sarel is a masculine given name and a surname. It is a variant of Carel, Charel and Charl, themselves a variant of Charles. Notable people with the name include:

== First name ==
- Sarel Burger (b. 1983), Namibian cricketer
- Sarel Cilliers (1801–1871), Voortrekker leader and preacher
- Sarel de Jong (b. 1996), Dutch kickboxer
- Sarel du Toit, (1864–1930), Boer general for the South African Republic
- Sarel Erwee (b. 1989), South African cricketer
- Sarel Petrus Marais, (b. 1989), a South African professional rugby union player
- Sarel Pretorius (b. 1984), South African rugby player
- Sarel van der Merwe (b. 1946), South African rally and racing driver
- Sarel Wolmarans (b. 1973), South African cricketer

== Last name ==
- Henry Sarel (1823–1887), Lieutenant Governor of Guernsey 1883–1885
- Sydney Sarel (1872–1950), British track and field athlete
- William Godfrey Molyneux Sarel (1875–1950), English British Army officer and cricketer
- William Samuel Sarel (1861–1933), British civil servant
