= Gilliam Vermeulen =

Namibian cricketer (born 1966)

Personal information
- Born: 12 November 1966 (age 60); Mariental, Namibia
- Source: Cricinfo, 1 December 2020

Gilliam Vermeulen (born 12 November 1966) is a Namibian cricketer. He played in twelve first-class and three List A matches for Boland from 1985/86 to 1988/89 in South Africa.

== See also ==
- List of Boland representative cricketers
