= Ernest Looch =

South African cricketer (born 1975)

Personal information
- Born: 21 April 1975 (age 51); Pretoria, South Africa
- Source: Cricinfo, 1 December 2020

Ernest Michael Looch (born 21 April 1975) is a South African cricketer and businessman. He played in three first-class matches for Boland in 1998/99. He graduated with a master's degree in accounting, before moving to London temporarily, until returning to South Africa to found Equitable BEE Solutions Ltd in 2003.

== See also ==
- List of Boland representative cricketers
