= Pieter Swart =

South African cricketer (born 1965)

Personal information
- Born: 11 September 1965 (age 61); Caledon, South Africa
- Source: Cricinfo, 1 December 2020

Pieter Swart (born 11 September 1965) is a South African cricketer. He played in one first-class match for Boland in 1994/95.

== See also ==
- List of Boland representative cricketers
