= Andre Wasserfall =

South African cricketer (born 1955)

Personal information
- Born: 13 November 1955 (age 70); Cape Town, South Africa
- Source: Cricinfo, 1 December 2020

Andre Wasserfall (born 13 November 1955) is a South African cricketer. He played in two first-class matches for Boland in 1980/81.

== See also ==
- List of Boland representative cricketers
