= Sean Andrews (cricketer, born 1973) =

South African cricketer (born 1973)

Personal information
- Born: 19 April 1973 (age 53); Paarl, South Africa
- Source: Cricinfo, 1 December 2020

Sean Andrews (born 19 April 1973) is a South African cricketer. He played in three first-class matches for Boland in 1992/93 and 1993/94.

== See also ==
- List of Boland representative cricketers
