= Andre du Toit =

South African cricketer (born 1952)

Personal information
- Born: 9 October 1952 (age 74); Kenhardt, South Africa
- Source: Cricinfo, 1 December 2020

Andre du Toit (born 9 October 1952) is a South African cricketer. He played in 31 first-class and 6 List A matches for Boland from 1980/81 and 1986/87.

== See also ==
- List of Boland representative cricketers
