= Detlev Traut =

South African cricketer (born 1955)

Personal information
- Born: 29 June 1955 (age 71); Malmesbury, South Africa
- Source: Cricinfo, 1 December 2020

Detlev Traut (born 29 June 1955) is a South African cricketer. He played in one List A and eight first-class matches for Boland from 1980/81 to 1984/85.

== See also ==
- List of Boland representative cricketers
