= Lawton Jacobs =

South African cricketer (born 1961)

Personal information
- Born: 16 May 1961 (age 65); Stellenbosch, South Africa
- Source: Cricinfo, 1 December 2020

Lawton Jacobs (born 16 May 1961) is a South African former cricketer. He played in twenty-four first-class and three List A matches for Boland from 1973/74 to 1988/89.

== See also ==
- List of Boland representative cricketers
