= James Albanie =

South African cricketer (born 1968)

Personal information
- Born: 1 May 1968 (age 58); Touws River, South Africa
- Source: Cricinfo, 1 December 2020

James Albanie (born 1 May 1968) is a South African cricketer. He played in one List A and ten first-class matches for Boland from 1995/96 to 1998/99.

== See also ==
- List of Boland representative cricketers
