= Barry Chedburn =

South African cricketer (born 1967)

Personal information
- Born: 24 October 1967 (age 59); Cape Town, South Africa
- Source: Cricinfo, 1 December 2020

Barry Chedburn (born 24 October 1967) is a South African cricketer. He played in one List A and thirteen first-class matches for Boland from 1991/92 and 1994/95.

== See also ==
- List of Boland representative cricketers
