= Ian Richards (South African cricketer) =

South African cricketer (born 1965)

Personal information
- Born: 1 January 1965 (age 61); Johannesburg, South Africa
- Source: Cricinfo, 1 December 2020

Ian Richards (born 1 January 1965) is a South African cricketer. He played in one List A and seven first-class matches for Boland from 1987/88 to 1989/90.

== See also ==
- List of Boland representative cricketers
