= Graeme Marais =

South African cricketer (born 1982)

Personal information
- Born: 15 July 1982 (age 44); Johannesburg, South Africa
- Source: Cricinfo, 1 December 2020

Graeme Marais (born 15 July 1982) is a South African cricketer. He played in six first-class and seven List A matches for Boland from 2001 to 2003.

== See also ==
- List of Boland representative cricketers
