= Matt Brink =

South African cricketer (born 1975)

Personal information
- Full name: Mechiel Matthys Brink
- Born: 10 June 1975 (age 51); Barberton, South Africa
- Source: Cricinfo, 1 December 2020

Matt Brink (born 10 June 1975) is a South African cricketer. He played in fifteen first-class and nineteen List A matches for Boland from 1994 to 2007.

== See also ==
- List of Boland representative cricketers
