= Junaid Cassiem =

South African cricketer (born 1993)

Personal information
- Born: 3 October 1993 (age 33); Wellington, South Africa
- Source: Cricinfo, 1 December 2020

Junaid Cassiem (born 3 October 1993) is a South African former cricketer. He played in nine first-class and three List A matches for Boland from 2015 to 2017.

== See also ==
- List of Boland representative cricketers
