= Martyn van Blommenstein =

South African cricketer (born 1957)

Personal information
- Born: 28 June 1957 (age 69); Malmesbury, South Africa
- Source: Cricinfo, 1 December 2020

Martyn van Blommenstein (born 28 June 1957) is a South African cricketer. He played in one List A and two first-class matches for Boland in 1981/82.

== See also ==
- List of Boland representative cricketers
