= New Zealand cricket team in South Africa in 2012–13 =

International cricket tour

	South Africa	New Zealand
- Dates: 18 December 2012 – 25 January 2013

Test series
- Result: South Africa won the 2-match series 2–0
Most runs	Hashim Amla (176)	Dean Brownlie (172)
Most wickets	Dale Steyn (13)	Trent Boult (4); Doug Bracewell (4)

One Day International series
- Results: New Zealand won the 3-match series 2–1
Most runs	Graeme Smith (189)	Kane Williamson (156)
Most wickets	Lonwabo Tsotsobe (8); Ryan McLaren (8)	Kane Williamson (6); Mitchell McClenaghan (6)

Twenty20 International series
- Results: South Africa won the 3-match series 2–1
Most runs	Henry Davids (143)	Martin Guptill (125)
Most wickets	Ryan McLaren (5)	Doug Bracewell (5)

The New Zealand cricket team toured South Africa from 18 December 2012 to 25 January 2013. The tour consisted of two test matches, three One Day Internationals, and three Twenty20 International matches. In their first innings of the First Test, New Zealand were dismissed for just 45 runs, their third lowest Test match total and the lowest total in Test cricket in 39 years. In the same match, South African cricketer Jacques Kallis became the fourth batsman to make 13,000 runs in Test cricket. New Zealand were without ex-captain Ross Taylor, who had a falling-out with coach Mike Hesson, and Jesse Ryder, who remained in self-imposed exile from international cricket.

== Squads ==
Tests		ODIs		T20Is	
South Africa	New Zealand	South Africa	New Zealand	South Africa	New Zealand
Graeme Smith (c); Hashim Amla; AB de Villiers (wk); Faf du Plessis; Dean Elgar; Jacques Kallis; Rory Kleinveldt; Ryan McLaren; Morné Morkel; Alviro Petersen; Robin Peterson; Vernon Philander; Jacques Rudolph; Dale Steyn	Brendon McCullum (c); Trent Boult; Doug Bracewell; Dean Brownlie; Daniel Flynn; James Franklin; Martin Guptill; Mitchell McClenaghan; Bruce Martin; Chris Martin; Colin Munro; Jeetan Patel; Neil Wagner; BJ Watling (wk); Kane Williamson			Faf du Plessis (c); Farhaan Behardien; Henry Davids; Quinton de Kock (wk); Rory Kleinveldt; Richard Levi; Ryan McLaren; David Miller	

== Tour Match ==
=== T20: South Africa XI v New Zealanders ===
18 December 2012
13:00
Scorecard

New Zealanders; 140/8 (20 overs)	v	South Africa XI; 116/9 (20 overs)
Colin Munro 39 (27); Kyle Abbott 4/16 (4 overs)		Vaughn van Jaarsveld 43 (43); Mitchell McClenaghan 3/19 (4 overs)

New Zealanders won by 24 runs
City Oval, Pietermaritzburg
Umpires: Johan Cloete and Shaun George

- New Zealanders won the toss and chose to bat

=== First class: South Africa XI v New Zealanders ===
28–30 December 2012
Scorecard

New Zealanders	v	South Africa XI
311/6d (89.1 overs); Brendon McCullum 65 (126); Colin Ackermann 3/46 (21 overs)		359/7d (119 overs); Matthew Kleinveldt 78 (169); Chris Martin 2/39 (19 overs)
117/2d (29 overs); Martin Guptill 68* (79); Petrus Jeftha 1/17 (6 overs)

Match Drawn
Boland Bank Park, Paarl
Umpires: Shaun George and Adrian Holdstock

- New Zealanders won the toss and elected to bat first.

== T20I series ==
=== 1st T20I ===
21 December 2012
20:00 (D/N)
Scorecard

New Zealand; 86 (18.2 overs)	v	South Africa; 87/2 (12.1 overs)
Colin Munro 23 (18); Rory Kleinveldt 3/18 (3.2 overs)		Faf du Plessis 38* (32); Ronnie Hira 1/15 (3 overs)

South Africa won by 8 wickets
Kingsmead, Durban
Umpires: Johan Cloete and Shaun George (both RSA)
Player of the match: Rory Kleinveldt

- New Zealand won the toss and elected to bat.
- Corey Anderson, Mitchell McClenaghan, Colin Munro, Jimmy Neesham (for New Zealand), and Henry Davids, Quinton de Kock, and Chris Morris (for South Africa) made their Twenty20 International debuts.

=== 2nd T20I ===
23 December 2012
20:00 (D/N)
Scorecard

South Africa; 165/5 (19 overs)	v	New Zealand; 169/2 (19 overs)
Faf du Plessis 63 (43); Doug Bracewell 3/33 (3 overs)		Martin Guptill 101* (69); Ryan McLaren 1/26 (4 overs)

New Zealand won by 8 wickets (D/L)
Buffalo Park, East London
Umpires: Shaun George and Adrian Holdstock
Player of the match: Martin Guptill (NZ)

- New Zealand won the toss and elected to field.
- Floodlight failure during South Africa's innings reduced the match to 19 overs per side. New Zealand's target was revised to 169 runs from 19 overs according to the Duckworth–Lewis method.
- Aaron Phangiso (RSA) makes his Twenty20 International debut.

=== 3rd T20I ===
26 December 2012
14:30
Scorecard

South Africa; 179/6 (20 overs)	v	New Zealand; 146/9 (20 overs)
Henry Davids 68 (51); Mitchell McClenaghan 2/24 (4 overs)		Brendon McCullum 25 (22); Aaron Phangiso 3/25 (4 overs); Ryan McLaren 3/25 (4 overs)

South Africa won by 33 runs
St George's Park, Port Elizabeth
Umpires: Johan Cloete and Adrian Holdstock
Player of the match: Henry Davids

- South Africa won the toss and elected to bat

== Test Series ==
=== 1st Test ===
2–6 January 2013
Scorecard

New Zealand	v	South Africa
45 (19.2 overs); Kane Williamson 13 (19); Vernon Philander 5/7 (6 overs)		347/8d (95.2 overs); Alviro Petersen 106 (176); Chris Martin 3/63 (19.2 overs)
275 (102.1 overs); Dean Brownlie 109 (186); Dale Steyn 3/67 (30 overs)

South Africa won by an innings and 27 runs
Newlands Cricket Ground, Cape Town
Umpires: Ian Gould and Rod Tucker
Player of the match: Vernon Philander (SA)

- New Zealand won the toss and elected to bat
- Dale Steyn takes 300 wickets in Tests.
- Jacques Kallis reaches 13000 runs in Tests.

=== 2nd Test ===
11–15 January 2013
Scorecard

South Africa	v	New Zealand
525/8d (153.5 overs); Faf du Plessis 137 (252); Doug Bracewell 3/94 (34 overs)		121 (44.4 overs); BJ Watling 63 (87); Dale Steyn 5/17 (13 overs)
		211(f/o) (86.4 overs); BJ Watling 63 (117); Dale Steyn 3/48 (15.4 overs)

South Africa won by an innings and 193 runs
St George's Park, Port Elizabeth
Umpires: Kumar Dharmasena (SL) and Ian Gould (Eng)
Player of the match: Dale Steyn (SA)

- South Africa won the toss and elected to bat.
- Colin Munro made his Test debut for New Zealand.

== ODI Series ==
=== 1st ODI ===
19 January 2013
10:00
Scorecard

South Africa; 208 (46.2 overs)	v	New Zealand; 209/9 (45.4 overs)
Faf du Plessis 57 (72); Mitchell McClenaghan 4/20 (10 overs)		James Franklin 47* (61); Ryan McLaren 4/46 (8.4 overs)

New Zealand won by 1 wicket
Boland Bank Park, Paarl
Umpires: Enamul Haque (Ban) and Shaun George (SA)
Player of the match: James Franklin (NZ)

- New Zealand won the toss and elected to field.
- Mitchell McClenaghan, Jimmy Neesham (for New Zealand), and Quinton de Kock and Rory Kleinveldt (for South Africa) made their ODI debuts.

=== 2nd ODI ===
22 January 2013
14:30 (D/N)
Scorecard

New Zealand; 279/8 (50 overs)	v	South Africa; 252 (49.1 overs)
Kane Williamson 145* (136); Morne Morkel 3/71 (10 overs)		Colin Ingram 79 (94); Kyle Mills 2/28 (9 overs)

New Zealand won by 27 runs
De Beers Diamond Oval, Kimberley
Umpires: Aleem Dar (PAK) & Johanes Cloete (RSA)
Player of the match: Kane Williamson (NZ)

- South Africa won the toss and elected to field.
- New Zealand win their first ever ODI series in South Africa
- Colin Munro (for New Zealand) and Farhaan Behardien (for South Africa) made their ODI debuts.

=== 3rd ODI ===
25 January 2013
14:30 (D/N)
Scorecard

New Zealand; 260/9 (50 overs)	v	South Africa; 264/9 (50 overs)
Colin Munro 57 (62); Lonwabo Tsotsobe 4/45 (10 overs)		Graeme Smith 116 (130); James Franklin 2/38 (6 overs)

South Africa won by 1 wicket
Senwes Park, Potchefstroom
Umpires: Enamul Haque (Ban) and Adrian Holdstock (RSA)
Player of the match: Graeme Smith (RSA)

- New Zealand won the toss and elected to bat.
- Aaron Phangiso (RSA) made his ODI debut.
