= Josua Swanepoel =

South African cricketer (born 1983)

Personal information
- Born: 27 May 1983 (age 43); Durban, South Africa
- Source: Cricinfo, 1 December 2020

Josua Swanepoel (born 27 May 1983) is a South African cricketer. He played in one first-class match for Boland in 2007.

== See also ==
- List of Boland representative cricketers
