= Munnik =

Munnik is a surname. Notable people with the surname include:

- George Munnik, South African judge
- James Munnik, South African cricketer

== See also ==
- Acda en De Munnik, Dutch cabaret and musical duo
- James Barry Munnik Hertzog, South African politician and soldier
