= Mark van der Merwe =

South African cricketer (born 1970)

Personal information
- Born: 17 June 1970 (age 56); Strand, South Africa
- Source: Cricinfo, 1 December 2020

Mark van der Merwe (born 17 June 1970) is a South African former cricketer. He played in five first-class matches for Boland from 1990/91 to 1992/93.

== See also ==
- List of Boland representative cricketers
