= Rohan Hoffman =

South African cricketer (born 1973)

Personal information
- Born: 8 April 1973 (age 53); Bellville, South Africa
- Source: Cricinfo, 1 December 2020

Rohan Hoffman (born 8 April 1973) is a South African cricketer. He played in three first-class matches for Boland in 1993/94 and 1994/95.

== See also ==
- List of Boland representative cricketers
