= Nieuwoudt =

Nieuwoudt (Afrikaans: [niˈvœut], Dutch: [ˈniu.ʌut]) is an Afrikaans and Dutch surname of topographic origin. It is an altered version of the original Dutch Nieuhout with the meaning 'new woods' (from nieuw 'new' and hout 'woods'). Notable people with this name include:

- Gideon Nieuwoudt (1951–2005), South African former security policeman
- Karl Nieuwoudt (born 1988), South African cricketer
- Nicolaas Nieuwoudt (1929–1989), South African military commander
- Stephanus Francois Nieuwoudt (born 1996), South African rugby union player
- Janneman Nieuwoudt Malan (born 1996), South African cricketer.

== See also ==
- Nieuwoudtville, town in Northern Cape province of South Africa
