= Warren Groeneveld =

South African cricketer (born 1983)

Personal information
- Full name: Warren Shaun Groeneveld
- Born: 21 August 1983 (age 43); Paarl, South Africa
- Batting: Left-handed
- Bowling: Left-arm orthodox spin
- Relatives: RL Groeneveld (brother)

Domestic team information
- Years: Team
- 2007–present: Boland
- First-class debut: 8 November 2007 Boland v KwaZulu-Natal
- List A debut: 14 October 2007 Boland v KwaZulu-Natal Inland

Career statistics
Competition	First-class	List A
Matches	12	7
Runs scored	327	126
Batting average	16.35	25.20
100s/50s	0/2	0/0
Top score	55	36
Balls bowled	0	0
Wickets	-	-
Bowling average	-	-
5 wickets in innings	-	-
10 wickets in match	-	-
Best bowling	-	-
Catches/stumpings	3/–	2/–
- Source: CricketArchive, 3 April 2012

Warren Shaun Groeneveld (born 21 August 1983) is a South African cricketer who currently plays for Boland. He is a left-handed batsman and left-arm orthodox spin bowler. Groeneveld made his first-class debut on 8 November 2007 against KwaZulu-Natal.
