= Richard Schultz (cricketer) =

South African cricketer (born 1949)

Personal information
- Born: 25 May 1949 (age 77); Oudtshoorn, South Africa
- Source: Cricinfo, 1 December 2020

Richard Schultz (born 25 May 1949) is a South African former cricketer. He played in thirteen first-class and three List A matches for Boland in 1980/81 and 1981/82.

== See also ==
- List of Boland representative cricketers
