= John Roos (cricketer) =

South African cricketer (born 1966)

Personal information
- Born: 19 September 1966 (age 60); Klerksdorp, South Africa
- Source: Cricinfo, 1 December 2020

John Roos (born 19 September 1966) is a South African cricketer. He played in 26 first-class and 4 List A matches for Boland from 1990/91 to 1994/95.

== See also ==
- List of Boland representative cricketers
