= Willem Louw (cricketer) =

South African cricketer (born 1980)

Personal information
- Born: 21 October 1980 (age 46); Johannesburg, South Africa
- Source: Cricinfo, 1 December 2020

Willem Louw (born 21 October 1980) is a South African cricketer. He played in seven first-class and eight List A matches for Boland in 2005 and 2006.

== See also ==
- List of Boland representative cricketers
