= Charl Coetzee =

South African cricketer (born 1951)

Personal information
- Born: 7 September 1951 (age 75); Parow, South Africa
- Source: Cricinfo, 1 December 2020

Charl Coetzee (born 7 September 1951) is a South African cricketer. He played in 26 first-class and 8 List A matches for Boland from 1980/81 and 1985/86.

== See also ==
- List of Boland representative cricketers
