= Hendrik Joubert =

South African cricketer (born 1949)

Personal information
- Born: 15 May 1949 (age 77); Bellville, South Africa
- Source: Cricinfo, 1 December 2020

Hendrik Joubert (born 15 May 1949) is a South African cricketer. He played in three first-class matches for Boland in 1984/85 and 1985/86.

== See also ==
- List of Boland representative cricketers
