= Jonathan Clark (cricketer) =

South African cricketer (born 1981)

Personal information
- Born: 5 May 1981 (age 45); Paarl, South Africa
- Source: Cricinfo, 1 December 2020

Jonathan Clark (born 5 May 1981) is a South African cricketer. He played in four first-class and two List A matches for Boland in 2004 and 2005.

== See also ==
- List of Boland representative cricketers
