= Jerry Kennedy (cricketer) =

South African cricketer (born 1938)

Personal information
- Born: 21 September 1938 (age 88); Strand, South Africa
- Source: Cricinfo, 1 December 2020

Jerry Kennedy (born 21 September 1938) is a South African former cricketer. He played in one List A and three first-class matches for Boland in 1980/81.

== See also ==
- List of Boland representative cricketers
