= Nicolaas Lambrechts =

South African cricketer (born 1961)

Personal information
- Born: 24 October 1961 (age 65); Worcester, South Africa
- Source: Cricinfo, 1 December 2020

Nicolaas Lambrechts (born 24 October 1961) is a South African former cricketer. He played in 33 first-class and 11 List A matches for Boland from 1982/83 to 1990/91.

== See also ==
- List of Boland representative cricketers
