= Lambert Fick =

South African cricketer (born 1959)

Personal information
- Born: 21 January 1959 (age 67); Reivilo, South Africa
- Source: Cricinfo, 1 December 2020

Lambert Fick (born 21 January 1959) is a South African cricketer. He played in one List A and eight first-class matches for Boland in 1982/83 and 1983/84.

== See also ==
- List of Boland representative cricketers
