= Jacques de Villiers =

South African cricketer (born 1954)

Personal information
- Born: 19 August 1954 (age 72); Paarl, South Africa
- Source: Cricinfo, 1 December 2020

Jacques de Villiers (born 19 August 1954) is a South African cricketer. He played in six first-class and three List A matches for Boland in 1980/81 and 1981/82.

== See also ==
- List of Boland representative cricketers
