= Johannes Justus =

South African cricketer (born 1962)

Personal information
- Born: 13 October 1962 (age 64); Bellville, South Africa
- Source: Cricinfo, 1 December 2020

Johannes Justus (born 13 October 1962) is a South African cricketer. He played in six first-class and five List A matches for Boland from 1984/85 to 1990/91.

== See also ==
- List of Boland representative cricketers
