= Rico Marais =

South African cricketer (born 1964)

Personal information
- Born: 13 October 1964 (age 62); Virginia, South Africa
- Source: Cricinfo, 1 December 2020

Rico Marais (born 13 October 1964) is a South African cricketer. He played in fifteen first-class and eleven List A matches for Boland from 1988/89 to 1990/91.

== See also ==
- List of Boland representative cricketers
