= Chris Viljoen =

South African cricketer (born 1947)

Personal information
- Born: 28 July 1947 (age 79); Durban, South Africa
- Source: Cricinfo, 1 December 2020

Chris Viljoen (born 28 July 1947) is a South African cricketer. He played in five first-class matches for Boland in 1980/81 and 1981/82.

== See also ==
- List of Boland representative cricketers
