= Hendrik Barnard =

South African cricketer (born 1964)

Personal information
- Born: 4 August 1964 (age 62); Cape Town, South Africa
- Source: Cricinfo, 1 December 2020

Hendrik Barnard (born 4 August 1964) is a South African cricketer. He played in 14 first-class and 25 List A matches for Boland from 1989/90 to 1993/94.

== See also ==
- List of Boland representative cricketers
