= Robert Dalrymple (cricketer) =

South African cricketer (born 1971)

Personal information
- Full name: Robert Ian Dalrymple
- Born: 10 August 1971 (age 55); Cape Town, South Africa
- Source: Cricinfo, 1 December 2020

Robert Dalrymple (born 10 August 1971) is a South African cricketer. He played in fourteen first-class and four List A matches for Boland from 1992/93 to 1994/95.

== See also ==
- List of Boland representative cricketers
