= Waylain September =

South African cricketer (born 1984)

Personal information
- Full name: Waylain Edwin September
- Born: 20 September 1984 (age 42); Paarl, South Africa
- Batting: Right-handed
- Bowling: Left-arm orthodox spin

Domestic team information
- Years: Team
- 2003–2009: Boland
- First-class debut: 2 April 2004 Boland v Eastern Province
- Last First-class: 5 March 2009 Boland v Eastern Province
- List A debut: 7 November 2004 Boland v Eastern Province
- Last List A: 4 April 2009 Boland v KwaZulu-Natal

Career statistics
Competition	First-class	List A
Matches	13	22
Runs scored	386	146
Batting average	21.44	12.16
100s/50s	0/1	0/0
Top score	63*	48
Balls bowled	1,602	837
Wickets	32	22
Bowling average	32.46	28.31
5 wickets in innings	0	0
10 wickets in match	0	0
Best bowling	4–30	3–29
Catches/stumpings	10/–	7–
- Source: CricketArchive, 5 April 2012

Waylain Edwin September (born 20 September 1984) is a South African cricketer who played for Boland between 2003 and 2009. A right-handed batsman and left-arm orthodox spin bowler, he made his first-class debut on 2 April 2004 against Eastern Province.
