= Ian Kuiler =

South African cricketer (born 1975)

Personal information
- Born: 2 January 1975 (age 51); Malmesbury, South Africa
- Source: Cricinfo, 1 December 2020

Ian Kuiler (born 2 January 1975) is a South African cricketer. He played in five first-class matches for Boland and Gauteng from 1995/96 to 1999/2000.
