= Manfred de Kock =

South African cricketer (born 1975)

Personal information
- Born: 3 February 1975 (age 51); Paarl, South Africa
- Source: Cricinfo, 1 December 2020

Manfred de Kock (born 3 February 1975) is a South African cricketer. He played in two first-class matches for Boland in 2000/01.

== See also ==
- List of Boland representative cricketers
