= John Hendricks (cricketer) =

South African cricketer (born 1956)

Personal information
- Born: 11 April 1956 (age 70); Stellenbosch, South Africa
- Source: Cricinfo, 1 December 2020

John Hendricks (born 11 April 1956) is a South African former cricketer. He played in twenty first-class and six List A matches for Boland from 1980/81 and 1988/89.

== See also ==
- List of Boland representative cricketers
