= Paarl Cricket Club Ground =

Cricket ground

- Interactive map of Paarl Cricket Club Ground

Ground information
- Location: Boland
- Country: South Africa
- Coordinates: 33.73924°S 18.97255°E
- Establishment: c1960

Team information
Boland	(1994–95)
- As of 13 November 2009; Source: CricketArchive

Paarl Cricket Club Ground is a cricket ground in Boland, South Africa. The first recorded match on the ground was in 1960, when Western Province Combined XI Women hosted the touring England women. Boland used the ground on four occasions during the 1994–95 Castle Cup.
