= Wallace Albertyn =

South African cricketer (born 1981)

Personal information
- Born: 26 May 1981 (age 45); Alberton, South Africa
- Source: Cricinfo, 1 December 2020

Wallace Albertyn (born 26 May 1981) is a South African cricketer. He played in 23 first-class and 30 List A matches for Boland from 2001 to 2006.

== See also ==
- List of Boland representative cricketers
