= Evert Ferreira =

South African cricketer (born 1976)

Personal information
- Born: 29 April 1976 (age 50); Pretoria, South Africa
- Source: Cricinfo, 1 December 2020

Evert Ferreira (born 29 April 1976) is a South African cricketer. He played in 18 first-class and 27 List A matches for Boland and Border from 1996/97 to 2000/01.
