= Lee-Roy Walters =

South African cricketer (born 1986)

Personal information
- Full name: Lee-Roy Walters
- Born: 3 December 1986 (age 39); Paarl, South Africa
- Batting: Right-handed
- Role: Wicket-keeper

Domestic team information
- Years: Team
- 2004–present: Boland
- First-class debut: 20 January 2005 Boland v Western Province
- List A debut: 6 November 2005 Boland v Western Province

Career statistics
Competition	First-class	List A
Matches	61	55
Runs scored	2,371	778
Batting average	29.63	25.93
100s/50s	0/18	0/3
Top score	92	68
Balls bowled	12	0
Wickets	1	0
Bowling average	8.00	-
5 wickets in innings	0	0
10 wickets in match	0	0
Best bowling	1–4	-
Catches/stumpings	165/15	67/13
- Source: CricketArchive, 2 April 2012

Lee-Roy Walters (born 3 December 1986) is a South African cricketer who plays as a wicket-keeper. A right-handed batsman, he has played for the Boland province team since the 2004/05 season.
