= Dale Campbell (cricketer) =

South African cricketer (born 1988)

Personal information
- Born: 17 January 1988 (age 38); Cape Town, South Africa
- Source: Cricinfo, 1 December 2020

Dale Campbell (born 17 January 1988) is a South African cricketer. He played in ten first-class and seven List A matches for Boland and Western Province from 2007 to 2013.

== See also ==
- List of Boland representative cricketers
