= Lloyd Hobson =

South African cricketer (born 1985)

Personal information
- Born: 22 October 1985 (age 41); Port Elizabeth, South Africa
- Source: Cricinfo, 1 December 2020

Lloyd Hobson (born 22 October 1985) is a South African cricketer. He played in one first-class and five List A matches for Boland and Eastern Province from 2008 to 2010.
