= Kevin Bridgens =

South African cricketer (born 1961)

Personal information
- Born: 21 December 1961 (age 64); Cape Town, South Africa
- Source: Cricinfo, 1 December 2020

Kevin Bridgens (born 21 December 1961) is a South African cricketer. He played in 44 first-class and 46 List A matches for Boland and Western Province from 1986/87 to 1992/93.

== See also ==
- List of Boland representative cricketers
