= Dominic Daniels =

South African cricketer (born 1992)

Personal information
- Full name: Dominic Lesley Daniels
- Born: 8 January 1992 (age 34); Paarl, South Africa
- Batting: Right-handed
- Bowling: Right-arm off break

Domestic team information
- Years: Team
- 2009–2011: Boland
- First-class debut: 20 December 2009 Boland v Easterns
- List A debut: 23 December 2009 Boland v Easterns

Career statistics
Competition	First-class	List A
Matches	3	7
Runs scored	37	137
Batting average	9.25	45.66
100s/50s	0/0	0/1
Top score	15*	53*
Balls bowled	0	0
Wickets	-	-
Bowling average	-	-
5 wickets in innings	-	-
10 wickets in match	-	-
Best bowling	-	-
Catches/stumpings	3/–	4/–
- Source: CricketArchive, 3 April 2012

Dominic Lesley Daniels (born 8 January 1992) is a South African cricketer who played several matches for Boland between 2009 and 2011. A right-handed batsman and right-arm off break bowler, he made his first-class debut on 20 December 2009 against Easterns.
