= Ryan Groeneveld =

South African cricketer (born 1981)

Personal information
- Born: 5 October 1981 (age 45); Paarl, South Africa
- Source: Cricinfo, 1 December 2020

Ryan Groeneveld (born 5 October 1981) is a South African cricketer. He played in 15 first-class and 18 List A matches for Boland from 2002 to 2007.

== See also ==
- List of Boland representative cricketers
