= Sarel Wolmarans =

South African cricketer (born 1973)

Personal information
- Born: 24 April 1973 (age 53); Vredenburg, South Africa
- Source: Cricinfo, 1 December 2020

Sarel Wolmarans (born 24 April 1973) is a South African cricketer. He played in seven List A matches for Boland in 1998/99.

== See also ==
- List of Boland representative cricketers
