= Riyaad Henry =

South African cricketer (born 1992)

Personal information
- Born: 4 July 1992 (age 34)
- Source: Cricinfo, 1 December 2020

Riyaad Henry (born 4 July 1992) is a South African cricketer. He played in 17 first-class, 8 List A, and 13 Twenty20 matches for Boland from 2012 to 2016.

== See also ==
- List of Boland representative cricketers
