= Stuart White (cricketer) =

South African cricketer (born 1970)

Personal information
- Born: 19 July 1970 (age 56); Cape Town, South Africa
- Source: Cricinfo, 1 December 2020

Stuart White (born 19 July 1970) is a South African cricketer. He played in one first-class match for Boland in 1993/94.

== See also ==
- List of Boland representative cricketers
