= Faan Fourie =

South African cricketer (born 1982)

Personal information
- Full name: Stefanis Jakobus Fourie
- Born: 10 December 1982 (age 43); Bethlehem, South Africa
- Batting: Right-handed
- Bowling: Right-arm medium-fast

Domestic team information
- Years: Team
- 2010: Boland
- Only First-class: 28 October 2010 Boland v Border
- Only List A: 13 November 2010 Boland v North West

Career statistics
Competition	First-class	List A
Matches	1	1
Runs scored	dnb	dnb
Batting average	-	-
100s/50s	-	-
Top score	-	-
Balls bowled	90	12
Wickets	0	0
Bowling average	-	-
5 wickets in innings	-	-
10 wickets in match	-	-
Best bowling	0–44	0–15
Catches/stumpings	1/–	0/–
- Source: CricketArchive, 4 April 2012

Stefanis Jakobus "Faan" Fourie (born 10 December 1982) is a South African cricketer who played two matches for Boland during the 2010–11 season. He is a right-handed batsman and right-arm medium-fast bowler.
