= Jaco Burger (cricketer) =

South African cricketer (born 1968)

Personal information
- Born: 16 August 1968 (age 58); Cape Town, South Africa
- Source: Cricinfo, 1 December 2020

Jaco Burger (born 16 August 1968) is a South African cricketer. He played in fifteen first-class and eleven List A matches from 1989/90 and 1995/96.

== See also ==
- List of Boland representative cricketers
