= Barry Richards (Boland cricketer) =

South African cricketer (born 1967)

Personal information
- Full name: Barry Hylton Richards
- Born: 16 December 1967 (age 58); Cape Town, South Africa
- Source: Cricinfo, 1 December 2020

Barry Hylton Richards (born 16 December 1967) is a South African cricketer. He played in six first-class matches for Boland in 1992/93 and 1993/94.

== See also ==
- List of Boland representative cricketers
