= Wayne Bird =

South African cricketer (born 1966)

Personal information
- Born: 21 July 1966 (age 60); Cape Town, South Africa
- Batting: Right-handed
- Bowling: Right-arm fast medium

Domestic team information
- Years: Team
- 1992/93: Boland
- Source: Cricinfo, 1 December 2020

Wayne Bird (born 21 July 1966) is a South African cricketer. He played in one List A match for Boland in 1992/93.
