= Mark Bredell =

South African cricketer (born 1972)

Personal information
- Born: 12 September 1972 (age 54); Port Elizabeth, South Africa
- Source: Cricinfo, 1 December 2020

Mark Bredell (born 12 September 1972) is a South African cricketer. He played in seven first-class matches for Boland in 1994/95.

== See also ==
- List of Boland representative cricketers
