= Elton Williams (cricketer) =

South African cricketer (born 1973)

Personal information
- Born: 19 September 1973 (age 53); Stellenbosch, South Africa
- Source: Cricinfo, 1 December 2020

Elton Williams (born 19 September 1973) is a South African former cricketer. He played in one first-class match for Boland in 1996/97.

== See also ==
- List of Boland representative cricketers
