= Hendrik Basson =

South African cricketer (born 1952)

Personal information
- Born: 26 March 1952 (age 74); Paarl, South Africa
- Source: Cricinfo, 1 December 2020

Hendrik Basson (born 26 March 1952) is a South African cricketer. He played in one List A and six first-class matches for Boland from 1980 to 1988.

== See also ==
- List of Boland representative cricketers
