= Carl Raubenheimer =

South African cricketer (born 1983)

Carl Helgaard Raubenheimer (born 19 December 1983) is a South African cricketer. He is a right-handed batsman and leg-break bowler who plays for Boland. He was born in Pretoria.

Raubenheimer made his first-class debut during the 2009–10 season, against Griqualand West. From the tailend, he scored 2 runs in the first innings in which he batted.
