= Quinton Kannemeyer =

South African cricketer (born 1984)

Personal information
- Full name: Quinton Kurt Kannemeyer
- Born: 31 May 1984 (age 42); Vredenburg, South Africa
- Batting: Right-handed
- Bowling: Right-arm medium-fast

Domestic team information
- Years: Team
- 2005–2011: Boland
- First-class debut: 24 November 2005 Boland v Eastern Province
- List A debut: 6 November 2005 Boland v Western Province

Career statistics
Competition	First-class	List A
Matches	13	23
Runs scored	401	305
Batting average	18.22	20.33
100s/50s	0/2	0/1
Top score	70	60
Balls bowled	689	461
Wickets	7	7
Bowling average	54.71	56.00
5 wickets in innings	0	0
10 wickets in match	0	0
Best bowling	3–39	2–31
Catches/stumpings	5/–	7/–
- Source: CricketArchive, 4 April 2012

Quinton Kurt Kannemeyer (born 31 May 1984) is a South African cricketer who played for Boland between 2005 and 2011. A right-handed batsman and right-arm medium-fast bowler, he made his first-class debut on 24 November 2005 against Eastern Province.
