= Gary Thomas (cricketer, born 1958) =

English cricketer (born 1958)

Gary Philip Thomas (born 8 November 1958) is a former English cricketer active from 1978 to 1988 who played for Warwickshire and Boland. He was born in Birmingham. He appeared in eleven first-class matches as a righthanded batsman who bowled right arm medium pace. He scored 377 runs with a highest score of 52 and held eight catches.
