= Omar Henry =

South African cricketer

Personal information
- Born: 22 January 1952 (age 74); Stellenbosch, Cape Province, South Africa
- Batting: Left-handed
- Bowling: Slow left-arm orthodox

International information
- National side: South Africa (1992–1993)
- Test debut (cap 248): 13 November 1992 v India
- Last Test: 2 January 1993 v India
- ODI debut (cap 19): 2 March 1992 v Sri Lanka
- Last ODI: 11 April 1992 v West Indies

Domestic team information
- Years: Team
- 1973/74–1975/76: Western Province (SACB team)
- 1977/78–1983/84: Western Province
- 1984/85–1988/89: Boland
- 1984/85–1988/89: Impalas
- 1989–1992: Scotland
- 1989/90–1992/93: Orange Free State
- 1993/94: Boland

Career statistics
Competition	Test	ODI	FC	LA
Matches	3	3	131	153
Runs scored	53	20	4,566	2282
Batting average	17.66	10.00	27.34	12.21
100s/50s	0/0	0/0	5/20	0/0
Top score	34	11	125	73*
Balls bowled	427	149	27,060	6,680
Wickets	3	2	443	105
Bowling average	63.00	62.50	25.17	39.67
5 wickets in innings	0	0	22	0
10 wickets in match	0	0	3	0
Best bowling	2/56	1/31	7/22	3/9
Catches/stumpings	2/–	1/–	129/–	56/–
- Source: ESPNcricinfo, 23 January 2014

Omar Henry (born 23 January 1952) is a South African former cricketer who represented South Africa and Scotland at the international level. He played in three Tests and three One Day Internationals for South Africa. He is notable for being the first non-white player of the post-Apartheid era (after Charlie Llewellyn in 1912) to play cricket for South Africa. Henry made both his Test and ODI debuts after turning 40 and was a member of the South African squad that reached the semi-finals of the 1992 Cricket World Cup. He played extensively in Scotland from 1982 to 1992. His son Riyaad Henry is also a professional cricketer who has played for Boland in domestic cricket in South Africa, and was called up to play for the Scotland A team in 2016.

== Biography ==
Henry was born in Stellenbosch in Cape Province and also believed to have shared a room along with his six siblings and parents. His hailed from a family background consisting of sportspeople. His father, maternal uncles and grandfather played rugby and cricket. He grew up watching non-white players playing in South Africa and considers former England cricketer Basil D'Oliveira as his childhood idol.

== Playing career ==
=== Scotland ===
Henry moved to Scotland in his mid-20s to play club cricket. He appeared for numerous clubs including Poloc, West Lothian, Arbroath and Stenhousemuir and scored over 14000 runs with 29 centuries in club matches. He was first picked for Scotland in 1981 against the touring Australians at Titwood and took two wickets on his debut. He played for Scotland 62 times, including 14 matches as captain, with his final appearance being in 1992. At the time, Scotland were not considered an international team, and would appear in English domestic competitions such as the Benson & Hedges Cup and NatWest Trophy, along well as tour matches against visiting international sides.

=== South Africa ===
As well as playing in Scotland until 1992, Henry also played domestic cricket in South Africa, representing Western Province, Boland and Orange Free State. He notably turned out for whites-only club Orange Free State in 1970s and became a regular in South African first-class matches from 1978. He represented South Africa in 1980s against the rebel touring sides at a time when South Africa was still banned from international cricket due to apartheid. He was picked in the 14-member South African squad for the 1992 Cricket World Cup, which marked the return of South African team after readmission, at the age of 40 as the only player of colour. He made his ODI debut against Sri Lanka on 2 March in a group stage match, returning figures of 1/31 in ten overs in a losing cause. It was the only match he played during the tournament. At the age of 40 years and 34 days, he was the second-oldest debutant for South Africa in ODI cricket, as well as first player of colour to play for South Africa in limited-overs cricket. He was controversially overlooked for the group stage match against hosts New Zealand, despite the match being played on a slow pitch which would have suited his left-arm spin bowling.

He was part of the Orange Free State team which won the 1992/93 Currie Cup, defeating Western Province in the final, and winning their first ever Currie Cup title. In the final, he won the man-of-the-final award for his all-round performance, scoring 104 in first innings and taking 7 wickets in the match. Following this, he was selected for the home Test series against India at the age of 40 and subsequently made his Test debut on 13 November 1992 during the first match of the series at the Kingsmead Cricket Ground in Durban. He became the oldest Test debutant for South Africa in test cricket at the age of 40 years and 295 days. He was dropped from the Test team following the series against India, having picked up only three wickets at a mediocre average of 63.

== Later career ==
After his retirement from international cricket, he served as head coach and chief selector for the Boland cricket team, before becoming its CEO. He was also occasionally involved in television commentary. He later served on the South African national selection panel, including a period as its chairman. He was replaced by Haroon Lorgat as the chairman of selectors in 2008.

== Controversy ==
In July 2021, during an emotional testimony at Cricket South Africa's Social Justice and Nation Building Hearings, he revealed that he was subjected to racist abuse during his playing days, which ultimately resulted in lack of international opportunities. He revealed that he had verbal arguments and heated exchange with South Africa's then-captain Kepler Wessels in the dressing room during the 1992 World Cup for not picking him for a group stage match against New Zealand which was played on a slow pitch. Omar had initially intended to fly home during the middle of the World Cup but was convinced to stay for the remainder of the tournament matches by Krish Makherdhuj.
