= Bryan Baguley =

South African cricketer (born 1971)

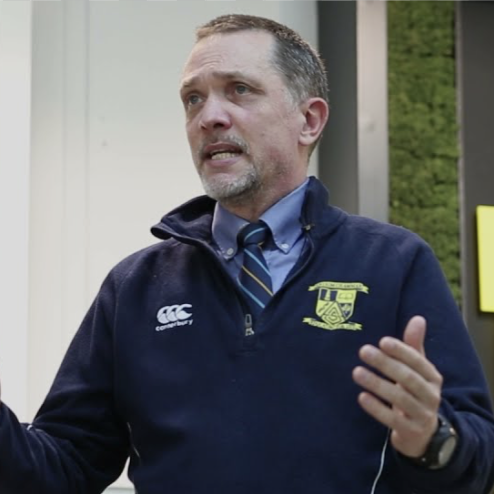
- Baguley in 2021

Personal information
- Full name: Bryan Christopher Baguley
- Born: 25 March 1971 (age 55); Cape Town, South Africa
- Nickname: Baggers
- Height: 1.77 m (5 ft 10 in)
- Batting: Right-handed
- Role: All-rounder

Domestic team information
- Years: Team
- 1991 - 1995: Western Province
- 1995 - 1998: Boland
- Source: Cricinfo, 1 December 2020

Bryan Baguley (born 25 March 1971) is a former South African cricketer. He played in sixteen first-class and eight List A matches for Boland and Western Province from 1991/92 to 1997/98 before moving to Northern Ireland.

== Personal life ==
Baguley has an MBA in Business Administration from the Open University and is currently a teacher of Business Studies GCSE and A-Level at Antrim Grammar School.

== See also ==
- List of Boland representative cricketers
