= Louis-Marc Germishuys =

South African cricketer (born 1967)

Personal information
- Born: 23 March 1967 (age 59); Cape Town, South Africa
- Source: Cricinfo, 1 December 2020

Louis-Marc Germishuys (born 23 March 1967) is a South African cricketer. He played in 26 first-class and 21 List A matches for Boland in 1993/94 and 1995/96.

== See also ==
- List of Boland representative cricketers
