= Rupert Bailey =

South African cricketer (born 1980)

Personal information
- Born: 20 February 1980 (age 46); Paarl, South Africa
- Source: Cricinfo, 1 December 2020

Rupert Bailey (born 20 February 1980) is a South African cricketer. He played in seventeen first-class and fourteen List A matches from 1998 to 2005.

== See also ==
- List of Boland representative cricketers
