= James Munnik =

South African cricketer (1953–2010)

Personal information
- Born: 1 October 1953; Graaff-Reinet, South Africa
- Died: 10 November 2010 (aged 57); De Tyger, Cape Town, South Africa
- Source: Cricinfo, 1 December 2020

James Barry Munnik (1 October 1953 – 10 November 2010) was a South African cricketer. He played in one List A and six first-class matches for Boland from 1984/85 to 1987/88.

Known as Barry, he was born in Graaff-Reinet on 1 October 1953. He was educated at Union High School where he matriculated in December 1971. After National Service in 1972 he studied at Rhodes University, Grahamstown, and graduated in 1975 with a Bachelor of Arts degree.

== See also ==
- List of Boland representative cricketers
