= Robert Brown (South African cricketer) =

South African cricketer (born 1957)

Robert Andrew Brown
Personal information
- Born: 21 August 1957 (age 69); King William's Town, South Africa
- Source: ESPNcricinfo, 6 May 2016

Robert Andrew Brown (born 21 August 1957) is a South African former cricketer. He played three first-class matches for Boland between 1986 and 1990.
