= Pieter Barnard =

South African cricketer (born 1970)

Personal information
- Born: 8 May 1970 (age 56); Nelspruit, South Africa
- Source: Cricinfo, 1 December 2020

Pieter Barnard (born 8 May 1970) is a South African cricketer. He played in 70 first-class and 56 List A matches from 1990/91 to 2000/01.

== See also ==
- List of Boland representative cricketers
