= Tiaan Cloete =

South African cricketer (born 1989)

Personal information
- Full name: Tiaan William Raymond Cloete
- Born: 12 November 1989 (age 37); Paarl, South Africa
- Batting: Left-handed
- Bowling: Slow left-arm orthodox

Domestic team information
- Years: Team
- 2009/10–2014/15: Boland
- First-class debut: 29 October 2009 Boland v Namibia
- Last First-class: 18 December 2014 Boland v Griqualand West
- List A debut: 31 October 2009 Boland v Namibia
- Last List A: 20 October 2013 Boland v Namibia

Career statistics
Competition	FC	LA	T20
Matches	36	30	12
Runs scored	1138	358	190
Batting average	19.96	19.88	19.00
100s/50s	2/1	0/2	0/0
Top score	121	53	43
Balls bowled	1233	737	201
Wickets	19	15	7
Bowling average	33.73	41.26	34.28
5 wickets in innings	0	0	0
10 wickets in match	0	0	0
Best bowling	4/23	2/29	2/23
Catches/stumpings	14/–	10/–	2/–
- Source: ESPNcricinfo, 6 November 2022

Tiaan William Raymond Cloete (born 12 November 1989) is a former South African cricketer. A left-handed batsman and left-arm orthodox spin bowler, he played first-class, List A, and twenty20 cricket for Boland, debuting in the 2009/10 season and making his last appearance in December 2014 at the age of 25.
