= John de Villiers (cricketer, born 1956) =

South African cricketer (born 1956)

Personal information
- Born: 5 July 1956 (age 70); Ladismith, South Africa
- Source: Cricinfo, 1 December 2020

John de Villiers (born 5 July 1956) is a South African former cricketer. He played in twelve first-class and six List A matches for Boland from 1989/90 to 1992/93.

== See also ==
- List of Boland representative cricketers
