= Chrisjan Vorster =

South African cricketer (born 1976)

Personal information
- Born: 17 August 1976 (age 50); Paarl, South Africa
- Source: Cricinfo, 1 December 2020

Chrisjan Vorster (born 17 August 1976) is a South African cricketer. He played in fourteen first-class and fifteen List A matches from 1996/97 to 1999/00.
