= John de Villiers (cricketer, born 1930) =

South African cricketer

Personal information
- Full name: John Olivier de Villiers
- Born: 28 February 1930; Cape Town, Cape Province, South Africa
- Died: 3 July 1969 (aged 39); Tarkastad, Cape Province, South Africa
- Batting: Right-handed
- Bowling: Unknown

Domestic team information
- Years: Team
- 1951–1952: Oxford University
- 1953/54: Orange Free State

Career statistics
Competition	First-class
Matches	11
Runs scored	347
Batting average	21.68
100s/50s	–/1
Top score	81
Balls bowled	42
Wickets	0
Bowling average	–
5 wickets in innings	–
10 wickets in match	–
Best bowling	–
Catches/stumpings	3/–
- Source: Cricinfo, 31 May 2020

John Olivier de Villiers (28 February 1930 – 3 July 1969) was a South African first-class cricketer.

de Villiers was born at Cape Town in February 1930. He later studied in England at University College at the University of Oxford. While studying at Oxford, he played first-class cricket for Oxford University, making his debut against Nottinghamshire at Oxford in 1951. He played first-class cricket for Oxford until 1952, making eight appearances. He scored a total of 237 runs in these eight matches, at an average of 21.54 and a high score of 81.

de Villers returned to South Africa after completing his studies, where he played for Orange Free State in the 1953/54 season, making three first-class appearances against the touring New Zealanders, Border and Transvaal. He scored 110 runs in these matches, with a high score of 24. de Villiers died at Tarkastad in July 1969.
