= Pieter Koen =

South African cricketer (born 1962)

Personal information
- Born: 8 March 1962 (age 64); Paarl, South Africa
- Source: Cricinfo, 1 December 2020

Pieter Koen (born 8 March 1962) is a South African cricketer. He played in fifteen first-class and fourteen List A matches for Boland and Western Province from 1984/85 and 1991/92.
