= Joyce Basson =

South African politician

Member of the National Assembly of South Africa
- In office 21 May 2014 – 7 May 2019

Personal details
- Party: African National Congress

Joyce Vuyiswa Basson is a South African politician. She was elected to the National Assembly of South Africa in 2014 as a member of the African National Congress. In parliament, she served on the Portfolio Committee on Basic Education.

Basson left parliament at the 2019 general election.
