= Michael Pote =

South African cricketer (born 1989)

Personal information
- Full name: Michael Grant Pote
- Born: 21 December 1989 (age 36); Cape Town, South Africa
- Nickname: Potey
- Batting: Left-handed
- Bowling: Right-arm leg spin
- Role: Batting all-rounder

Domestic team information
- Years: Team
- 2012–present: Western Province

Michael Grant Pote (born 21 December 1989) is a South African cricketer, who currently plays domestic cricket for the Cape Cobras and Western Province as an opening batsman and part-time leg-spinner. Pote made his first-class debut in 2012 for Western Province and was forced to retire hurt on 0*. Returning from injury, Pote made an almost incredible come back to cricket with scores of 119, 100*, 80, 90 and 122 in successive innings. From that success, Pote was signed up with a semi-pro contract with the Cape Cobras.
