= Hayes van der Berg =

South African cricketer (born 1994)

Personal information
- Full name: Hayes Joholan van der Berg
- Born: 8 December 1994 (age 31); Cape Province, South Africa
- Batting: Right-handed
- Bowling: Right-arm medium-fast
- Role: Batsman

Career statistics
Competition	FC	T20
Matches	1	1
Runs scored	66	0
Batting average	66.00	0
100s/50s	0/1	0/0
Top score	50	0
Catches/stumpings	0/0	0/1
- Source: ESPNcricinfo, 4 September 2016

Hayes van der Berg (born 8 December 1994) is a South African first-class cricketer. He is a right-handed batsman and a right-arm fast medium bowler. He made his First Class debut for Western Province against Border.
