= Derrin Bassage =

South African cricketer (born 1978)

Personal information
- Full name: Derrin James Bassage
- Born: 4 December 1978 (age 47); Pietermaritzburg, Natal, South Africa
- Batting: Left-handed
- Role: Occasional wicket-keeper

Domestic team information
- Years: Team
- 2003–2007: Western Province
- 2005–2007: Cape Cobras
- First-class debut: 31 October 2003 Western Province v North West
- Last First-class: 1 March 2007 Western Province v Eastern Province
- List A debut: 24 October 2004 Western Province v Eastern Province
- Last List A: 18 February 2007 Western Province v Boland

Career statistics
Competition	FC	LA	T20
Matches	36	15	4
Runs scored	1,828	362	48
Batting average	30.98	24.13	12.00
100s/50s	3/9	0/3	0/0
Top score	108*	81	20
Catches/stumpings	34/1	8/0	0/0
- Source: CricketArchive, 29 August 2011

Derrin James Bassage (born 4 December 1978) is a former South African first-class cricketer who made 55 appearances for the Western Province and Cape Cobras cricket teams. He made his debut in professional cricket in 2003 and played four seasons of South African domestic cricket, primarily appearing in first-class cricket, but also making a number of appearances in the one-day form of the game. He was born to Carol Ann Bassage (née Cooke) and Jack Bassage.
