= Andrew Wessels =

South African cricketer (born 1974)

Personal information
- Born: 13 May 1974 (age 52); Pietermaritzburg, South Africa
- Source: Cricinfo, 1 December 2020

Andrew Wessels (born 13 May 1974) is a former South African cricketer. He played in nine first-class and six List A matches from 1991/92 to 1996/97.
