= Neil Snyman =

Boland and Western Province cricketer (born 1963)

Neil Martin Snyman (born March 4, 1963, Prieska, Cape Province) is a former Boland and Western Province cricketer. A portly right-hand batsman with an occasional off-break, he featured in 27 first-class and eighteen List-A limited overs matches between the 1982/83 and 1992/93 South African seasons. At the former level of the game, he hit 1,612 runs at an average of 31.60 with three centuries, including a highest score of 137; at the latter, he could manage only 308 at 17.11 with a highest of 54, one of three half-centuries.
