= Terence Lazard =

South African cricketer and entrepreneur

Terence Nicholas Lazard (born 19 October 1965) is a South African entrepreneur and former cricketer. He played for Western Province, Eastern Province and Boland teams.

Born and raised in Cape Town, Lazard has two brothers and one sister. His parents were both doctors and after completing high school, he enrolled at the University of Cape Town in 1984 to study medicine.

== Cricket ==
In the 1980s, Lazard got involved in and played professional cricket. He played as a batsman for South Africa's Western Province cricket team from 1983 until 1995 and for Boland. The highlight of Lazard's cricket career was breaking the South African record by scoring 307 runs in 1983/84 during a Boland versus Western Province pre-season friendly game.

| Batting / fielding averages | First Class (1983/84 -1995/96) | List A (1983/84 -1995/96) |
|---|---|---|
| Matches played | 78 | 69 |
| Innings Batted | 146 | 67 |
| Not Outs | 15 | 9 |
| Runs Scored | 5280 | 2037 |
| Highest innings score | 307 | 108 |
| Batting average | 40.30 | 35.12 |
| Hundreds Scored | 12 | 2 |
| Fifties Scored | 24 | 13 |
| Catches taken | 17 | 11 |
| Stumpings made | 0 | 0 |

== Business ==
Lazard retired from cricket in 1995 to pursue a career in business. He has founded a number of businesses, including Cell Shack, Retail Mobile Credit Specialists, KLT holdings and BetKing.
