= Shane Summers (cricketer) =

South African cricketer (born 1981)

Personal information
- Born: 9 October 1981 (age 45); Vrendenburg, South Africa
- Source: Cricinfo, 1 December 2020

Shane Summers (born 9 October 1981) is a South African cricketer. He played in four first-class and fifteen List A matches from 2003 to 2007.
