= Martinus Smit =

South African cricketer (born 1956)

Personal information
- Born: 27 February 1956 (age 70); Hopetown, South Africa
- Source: Cricinfo, 1 December 2020

Martinus Smit (born 27 February 1956) is a South African cricketer. He played in ten first-class and three List A matches in 2007.
