= Richard Morris (South African cricketer) =

South African cricketer (born 1947)

Personal information
- Full name: Richard Edwin Tuffrey Morris
- Born: 28 January 1947 (age 79); Cape Town, South Africa
- Batting: Right-handed
- Bowling: Right-arm off break

Domestic team information
- Years: Team
- 1967/68–1978/79: Western Province

Career statistics
Competition	First class	List A
Matches	61	14
Runs scored	1,950	165
Batting average	25.32	20.62
100s/50s	2/10	0/0
Top score	135	42
Balls bowled	3,602	431
Wickets	117	12
Bowling average	30.78	35.91
5 wickets in innings	3	0
10 wickets in match	0	0
Best bowling	5/44	4/31
Catches/stumpings	44/–	3/–
- Source: CricInfo, 24 August 2009

Richard Edwin Tuffrey Morris (born 28 January 1947) is a former South African cricketer. He played 61 first-class and 14 List A matches for Western Province cricket team between 1967 and 1979 as an all-rounder.
