= Sean Ackermann =

South African cricketer (born 1977)

Personal information
- Born: 6 June 1977 (age 49); Cape Town, South Africa
- Source: Cricinfo, 1 December 2020

Sean Ackermann (born 6 June 1977) is a South African cricketer. He played in eight first-class and seventeen List A matches for Boland and Western Province from 1996/97 to 1999/00.
