= Taariq Chiecktey =

South African cricketer (born 1993)

Personal information
- Born: 26 May 1993 (age 33); Cape Province, South Africa
- Batting: Right-handed
- Role: Wicket-keeper

Career statistics
| Competition | FC | LA | T20 |
|---|---|---|---|
| Matches | 6 | 3 | 2 |
| Runs scored | 169 | 28 | 19 |
| Batting average | 18.77 | 9.33 | 9.50 |
| 100s/50s | 0/1 | 0/0 | 0/0 |
| Top score | 82 | 16 | 18 |
| Catches/stumpings | 19/0 | 2/1 | 4/0 |
- Source: ESPNcricinfo, 4 September 2016

Taariq Chiecktey is a South African first-class cricketer. He is a right-handed batsman and a wicketkeeper. He made his First Class debut for Western Province against Border
