= Willem du Toit =

South African cricketer (born 1981)

Personal information
- Born: 18 March 1981 (age 45); Cape Town, South Africa
- Source: Cricinfo, 1 December 2020

Willem du Toit (born 18 March 1981) is a South African cricketer.

== Career ==
He played in 19 first-class and 22 List A matches for Boland and Cape Cobras from 1998 to 2009.
