= Derek Kohler =

South African cricketer (born 1953)

Personal information
- Born: 22 January 1953 (age 73); Cape Town, South Africa
- Source: Cricinfo, 1 December 2020

Derek Kohler (born 22 January 1953) is a South African cricketer. He played in one first-class match for Western Province in 1976/77, and one List A match for Boland in 1984/85.
