= Andre Volsteedt =

South African cricketer (born 1975)

Personal information
- Born: 6 May 1975 (age 51); Bloemfontein, South Africa
- Source: Cricinfo, 1 December 2020

Andre Volsteedt (born 6 May 1975) is a South African cricketer. He played in thirteen first-class and two List A matches from 1993/94 to 1998/99.
