= Richard Rail =

South African cricketer and British Army officer

Personal information
- Full name: Richard Angwin Rail
- Born: 25 July 1888; Waverley, New South Wales, Australia
- Died: 9 October 1917 (aged 29); Poelkappelle, West Flanders, Belgium
- Batting: Unknown

Domestic team information
- Years: Team
- 1913/14: Western Province

Career statistics
Competition	First-class
Matches	1
Runs scored	13
Batting average	6.50
100s/50s	–/–
Top score	8
Catches/stumpings	–/–
- Source: Cricinfo, 3 April 2021

Richard Angwin Rail (25 July 1888 – 9 October 1917) was an Australian-born South African first-class cricketer and British Army officer.
