= Karl Nieuwoudt =

South African cricketer (born 1988)

Personal information
- Full name: Gerrit Karl Nieuwoudt
- Born: 8 March 1988 (age 38); Cape Town, South Africa
- Batting: Right-handed
- Bowling: Right-arm fast-medium

Domestic team information
- Years: Team
- 2008–2011: Boland
- First-class debut: 16 October 2008 Boland v Griqualand West
- List A debut: 3 October 2010 Boland v Eastern Province

Career statistics
| Competition | First-class | List A |
|---|---|---|
| Matches | 6 | 6 |
| Runs scored | 165 | 18 |
| Batting average | 23.57 | 9.00 |
| 100s/50s | 0/1 | 0/0 |
| Top score | 50 | 16 |
| Balls bowled | 776 | 108 |
| Wickets | 16 | 2 |
| Bowling average | 24.93 | 52.00 |
| 5 wickets in innings | 0 | 0 |
| 10 wickets in match | 0 | 0 |
| Best bowling | 4–36 | 1–17 |
| Catches/stumpings | 6/– | 1/– |
- Source: CricketArchive, 3 April 2012

Gerrit Karl Nieuwoudt (born 8 March 1988) is a South African cricketer who played for Boland. He is a right-handed batsman and right-arm fast-medium bowler. Nieuwoudt made his first-class debut for Boland on 16 October 2008 against Griqualand West and went on to play 6 first-class matches for the province. Rated by his friends as being talented enough to play for the Proteas, Karl decided to pursue a professional career as Chartered Accountant. He currently resides in Amsterdam, the Netherlands. He enjoys playing cricket for a club in Voorburg.
