= Hillroy Paulse =

South African cricketer (born 1985)

Personal information
- Full name: Hillroy Henrico Paulse
- Born: 6 September 1985 (age 41); Paarl, South Africa
- Batting: Right-handed
- Bowling: Right-arm fast-medium
- Role: Bowler

Career statistics
Competition	FC	List A
Matches	35	22
Runs scored	230	64
Batting average	10.00	9.14
100s/50s	1/0	0/0
Top score	54	19
Balls bowled	3882	829
Wickets	83	31
Bowling average	29.22	21.16
5 wickets in innings	1	1
10 wickets in match	0	0
Best bowling	5/65	5/45
Catches/stumpings	8/–	6/–
- Source: CricketArchive, 6 October 2010

Hillroy Paulse (born 6 September 1985) is a South African cricketer. Paulse represents Boland and the Cape Cobras in the various South African first-class cricket competitions. He has made one appearance for the Cobras in his career so far but is a regular member of the Boland team. He is a fast-medium bowler and a lower order batsman.
