= Peter Laing =

South African cricketer (born 1984)

Personal information
- Born: 5 October 1984 (age 42); Johannesburg, South Africa
- Source: Cricinfo, 1 December 2020

Peter Laing (born 5 October 1984) is a South African cricketer. He played in 17 first-class and 16 List A matches for Boland and Western Province from 2005 to 2010.
