= Rushdi Jappie =

South African cricketer (born 1985)

Personal information
- Born: 3 September 1985 (age 41); Cape Town, South Africa
- Source: Cricinfo, 1 December 2020

Rushdi Jappie (born 3 September 1985) is a South African cricketer. He played in 63 first-class, 43 List A, and five Twenty20 matches from 2007 to 2014.
