= Petrus Jeftha =

South African cricketer

Personal information
- Full name: Petrus Johannes Nicolas Jeftha
- Born: 7 April 1987 (age 39); Touws River, South Africa
- Batting: Right-handed
- Bowling: Right-arm fast-medium

Domestic team information
- Years: Team
- 2009–present: Boland
- First-class debut: 29 October 2009 Boland v Namibia
- List A debut: 15 November 2009 Boland v KwaZulu-Natal Inland

Career statistics
Competition	First-class	List A
Matches	23	17
Runs scored	571	167
Batting average	19.03	20.87
100s/50s	0/4	0/0
Top score	61*	43
Balls bowled	2,640	363
Wickets	46	15
Bowling average	32.19	22.33
5 wickets in innings	2	0
10 wickets in match	0	0
Best bowling	6–34	4–28
Catches/stumpings	7/–	2/–
- Source: CricketArchive, 2 April 2012

Petrus Johannes Nicolas Jeftha (born 7 April 1987) is a South African cricketer. A right-handed batsman and right-arm fast-medium bowler, he has played first-class cricket for Boland since the 2009/10 season.

== Early life ==
Petrus Jeftha, also known as "Oubaas" in his home town (Touws River), started his cricket career at a very young age. He was always involved whenever the game of cricket was played or even practiced. As a young boy he used to play, what is called, street cricket in his neighborhood.

Petrus started his schooling at the age of 6 when he attended the local primary school Steenvliet Primary School. It wasn't long before he joined the under 11 team to showcase his talent and love for the game. He was soon selected to play for the North Boland (A sub-district of the Boland) under 12 side where he was the youngest player in his team. At only aged 12 he was selected to play for the boland under 13 Schools team as a leg spinner and middle order batsman, where he soon gained great respect for those who watched him play as well as those who played with and against him.

Petrus was only 12 years old when he made his first century for North Boland against a highly respected South Boland. At the young age of only 13, Petrus joined his local cricket club, (Touws River C.C.), to improve on his skills as a cricketer. He soon became one of the club's most valuable players. During his time at the club he received various awards for his craftsmanship, such as man of the match and batsman of the year. When he was only 19 he scored a record breaking century of 180 off 134 balls, making this the fastest century in the history of Touws River Cricket Club.

After completing his primary education Petrus received a bursary to go to the respected Worcester Gymnasium where he spend his high school career. It is here where his talent was truly developed as not only a cricketer but also a rugby player. Petrus continued representing boland at school level in cricket. In 2005 he represented boland at the Coca-Cola under-18 Craven Week annual rugby tournament. Later that same year he was selected to play for the South African under 18 side. He also represented Boland at under 21 level after finishing his secondary education. His cricket career did not suffer because when it was of season for rugby Petrus still played cricket.

== Professional career ==
In 2009 Petrus made his first class debut for Boland. In 2010 Boland offered him a cricket South Africa contract. His contract has been renewed thus making him still a representative of Boland, making this his third year as a Boland player. In 2012 Petrus received an offer from Oundle Town Cricket Club to play and coach the club as well as to coach one of the most renowned schools in England, Oundle School. He did not disappoint Oundle Town C.C. as he set up a record of 94 wickets for the season and thus contributing to them winning the league and being promoted to the premier league. Petrus was thus named player of the season. While he is a middle order batsman he changed his bowling style from leg spinner to fast bowler making him even more fierce and attacking.

In 2012 Petrus missed the opportunity of playing for the Cobras. Despite this setback he was selected to represent Cricket South Africa's Invitational team against New Zealand and Pakistan. While his career is still in the early stages he looks promising and experts predicts that he still has a lot to offer and is surely a force to be reckoned with.
