= Willem Smit =

South African cricketer (born 1974)

Personal information
- Born: 1 August 1974 (age 52); Calvinia, South Africa
- Source: Cricinfo, 1 December 2020

Willem Smit (born 1 August 1974) is a South African cricketer. He played in 25 first-class and 51 List A matches from 1994 to 2007.
