= David Schierhout =

South African cricketer

Personal information
- Full name: David Schierhout
- Role: Bowler

Domestic team information
- Years: Team
- 2019-2021: Western Province

Career statistics
Competition	FC	List A
Matches	7	4
Runs scored	17	7
Batting average	3.40	7.00
100s/50s	0/0	0/0
Top score	9	6
Balls bowled	622	150
Wickets	15	3
Bowling average	20.46	42.33
5 wickets in innings	0	0
10 wickets in match	0	0
Best bowling	3/57	1/22
Catches/stumpings	2/0	0/0
- Source: Cricinfo, 12 March 2026

David Schierhout is a South African cricketer. He made his first-class debut on 19 December 2019, for Western Province in the 2019–20 CSA 3-Day Provincial Cup. He made his List A debut on 22 December 2019, for Western Province in the 2019–20 CSA Provincial One-Day Challenge.
