= Allan Elgar =

South African cricketer (1960–1999)

Personal information
- Born: 29 June 1960; Durban, South Africa
- Died: 15 January 1999 (aged 38); Johannesburg, South Africa
- Source: Cricinfo, 1 December 2020

Allan Elgar (29 June 1960 – 15 January 1999) was a South African cricketer. He played in 36 first-class and 24 List A matches from 1981/82 to 1993/94. Elgar killed himself in January 1999, aged 38.
