= Riaan Oosthuizen =

South African cricketer (born 1972)

Personal information
- Born: 3 May 1972 (age 54); Cape Town, South Africa
- Source: Cricinfo, 1 December 2020

Riaan Oosthuizen (born 3 May 1972) is a South African cricketer. He played in six first-class and four List A matches from 1991/92 to 1996/97.
