= Derek Brand =

South African cricketer (born 1975)

Derek Brand (born 29 May 1975) is Wicket-keeper batsman who played for the Cape Cobras. Although not a regular in the squad, he scored 68* on his Pro20 debut in 2009. Brand only played three years of first-class cricket for Boland before retiring. Brand is also a medium pace bowler.
