= Jacobus du Toit =

South African cricketer (born 1959)

Personal information
- Born: 8 September 1959 (age 67); Worcester, South Africa
- Source: Cricinfo, 1 December 2020

Jacobus du Toit (born 8 September 1959) is a South African former cricketer. He played in 73 first-class and 46 List A matches from 1975/76 to 1991/92.
