= Warren Swan =

South African cricketer (born 1983)

Personal information
- Born: 30 May 1983 (age 43); Johannesburg, South Africa
- Source: Cricinfo, 1 December 2020

Warren Swan (born 30 May 1983) is a South African cricketer. He played in 28 first-class and 34 List A matches from 2004 to 2009.
