= Darryl le Roux =

South African cricketer (born 1956)

Personal information
- Born: 30 October 1956 (age 70); Bloemfontein, South Africa
- Source: Cricinfo, 1 December 2020

Darryl le Roux (born 30 October 1956) is a South African cricketer. He played in 55 first-class and 21 List A matches from 1975/76 to 1992/93.
