= Carl Spilhaus =

South African cricketer (born 1963)

Personal information
- Born: 11 November 1963 (age 63); Cape Town, South Africa
- Source: Cricinfo, 1 December 2020

Carl Spilhaus (born 11 November 1963) is a South African cricketer. He played in 42 first-class and 12 List A matches from 1985/86 to 1995/96.
