= Gerhard Strydom =

South African cricketer (born 1979)

Johannes Gerhardus Strydom (born 6 September 1979, in Cape Town) is a South African first class cricketer for South Western Districts. A left-handed batsman, Strydom made his first class debut in 2000–01.
