= Monde Mahlombe =

South African cricketer (born 1985)

Personal information
- Born: 11 November 1985 (age 41); Cape Town, South Africa
- Source: Cricinfo, 1 December 2020

Monde Mahlombe (born 11 November 1985) is a South African cricketer. He played in 30 first-class, 47 List A, and 9 Twenty20 matches from 2005 to 2015.
