= Thando Mdodana =

South African cricketer (born 1986)

Personal information
- Born: 18 November 1986 (age 39); Cape Town, South Africa
- Source: Cricinfo, 1 December 2020

Thando Mdodana (born 18 November 1986) is a South African cricketer. He played in six first-class and two List A matches from 2006 to 2012.
