= Wesley Euley =

South African cricketer (born 1979)

Personal information
- Born: 10 October 1979 (age 47)
- Source: Cricinfo, 1 December 2020

Wesley Euley (born 10 October 1979) is a South African cricketer. He played in nine first-class, twenty List A, and seven Twenty20 matches from 2003 to 2007.
