= Boland cricket team =

Cricket team

Boland Cricket
- One Day name: Dafabet Boland

Personnel
- Captain: Keegan Petersen
- Coach: Justin Ontong
- Chief executive: James Fortuin
- Manager: Edwill Jacobs

Team information
- Founded: 1970
- Home ground: Boland Park, Paarl
- Capacity: 10,000
- Official website: Official website
First-class
T20I kit

The Boland cricket team is a first-class cricket team that nominally represents the Boland region, in the South African province of Western Cape, in the CSA Provincial Competitions. The team is selected and supported by the Boland Cricket Board (BCB) and plays its home games at Boland Park in Paarl. At organisational level, the BCB is responsible for the administration and development of cricket in the region and among its primary functions are management and promotion of the Boland team. The current BCB was founded in 1992 as a merger between the Boland Cricket Union and an earlier Boland Cricket Board.

== Honours ==
- CSA T20 Challenge (1) – 2021-22
- Standard Bank Cup (1) – 1999–2000

== Team history ==
Boland began playing in first-class matches in October 1980. They began in the lower (B-province) level of the first-class competitions but were raised to A-province status in 1994. To take part in the SuperSport Series, the Boland side merged with Western Province to form Western Province Boland (now Cape Cobras) from October 2004. Since 2004, Boland have competed in the CSA Provincial Competitions. As of late November 2022, they have played 348 first-class matches with 82 wins, 143 losses, 120 draws and three ties.

Among South African international players who have played for Boland have been the 2007 national player of the year, pace bowler Charl Langeveldt, who was with the Boland team throughout his domestic career from 1997 to 2013, and the all-rounder Justin Ontong played for Boland for nearly twenty years to 2017.

== Venues ==
Venues used for Boland matches have included:

- Oude Libertas, Stellenbosch Farmers Winery Ground, Stellenbosch (October 1980 – February 1991)
- Brackenfell Sports Fields (September 1989 – January 1995)
- Callie de Wet Sportsground, Robertson (used once in September 1990)
- Boland Park, Worcester (October 1990 – September 1993)
- Bredasdorp Cricket Club Ground (used once in September 1992)
- Stellenbosch University Ground, Coetzenburg (October 1993 – February 1999; used earlier by SA Universities in 1978)
- Paarl Cricket Club Ground (November 1994 – February 1995)
- Boland Park, Paarl (main venue from December 1994)

== Current squad ==
Squad for 2026/27 Season. Players in bold have played international cricket.

Name	Nationality	Birth date	Batting style	Bowling style	Notes
Batters
Ethan-John Cunningham	South Africa	28 July 2003 (age 23)	Right-handed	Right-arm seam	
Gavin Kaplan	South Africa	7 February 1998 (age 28)	Right-handed	Right-arm orthodox spin	
Ruan Terblanche	South Africa	14 March 2001 (age 25)	Right-handed	Right-arm orthodox spin	
Wicket-keepers
Blayde Capell	South Africa	3 June 1997 (age 29)	Left-handed		
**Clyde Fortuin**	South Africa	18 August 1995 (age 31)	Right-handed		
Jhedli Van Briesies	South Africa	15 July 2001 (age 25)	Right-handed	Right-arm orthodox spin	
All-rounders
Ferisco Adams	South Africa	12 July 1989 (age 37)	Right-handed	Right-arm seam	
**Neil Brand**	South Africa	12 April 1996 (age 30)	Left-handed	Left-arm orthodox spin	
Lehan Botha	South Africa	2 August 2001 (age 25)	Right-handed	Right-arm seam	
Nathan Jacobs	South Africa	27 March 2003 (age 23)	Right-handed	Right-arm seam	
Bowlers
Jevano Baron	South Africa	15 April 2001 (age 25)	Right-handed	Right-arm seam	
Yvez Kamanzi	South Africa	19 May 1999 (age 27)	Left-handed	Left-arm orthodox spin	High Performance
Siyabonga Mahima	South Africa	9 May 1996 (age 30)	Left-handed	Left-arm orthodox spin	
Imran Manack	South Africa	23 December 1991 (age 34)	Right-handed	Right-arm orthodox spin	
Akhona Mnyaka	South Africa	22 June 1999 (age 27)	Right-handed	Left-arm seam	
**Glenton Stuurman**	South Africa	22 June 1992 (age 34)	Right-handed	Right-arm seam	
**Lizaad Williams**	South Africa	1 October 1993 (age 32)	Left-handed	Right-arm seam	

== Coaching staff ==
As of October 2023

Position	Name
Head coach	Justin Ontong
Assistant coach	Henry Williams
Fielding coach	Ezra Pool

== Sources ==
- South African Cricket Annual – various editions
- Wisden Cricketers' Almanack – various editions
