= Deaths in September 2016 =

The following is a list of notable deaths in September 2016.

Entries for each day are listed alphabetically by surname. A typical entry lists information in the following sequence:

- Name, age, country of citizenship and reason for notability, established cause of death, reference.

== September 2016 ==
=== 1 ===
- Paige Cothren, 81, American football player (Los Angeles Rams, Philadelphia Eagles).
- Raymond Daveluy, 89, Canadian composer, organist, music educator and arts administrator.
- Thomas G. Doran, 80, American Roman Catholic prelate, Bishop of Rockford (1994–2012).
- Frederick Drandua, 73, Ugandan Roman Catholic prelate, Bishop of Arua (1986–2009), diabetes.
- Fred Hellerman, 89, American folk singer (The Weavers), guitarist, producer and songwriter.
- Kerson Huang, 88, Chinese-born American theoretical physicist.
- Ruth Hubbard, 92, Austrian-born American biologist.
- Kacey Jones, 66, American singer-songwriter ("I'm the One Mama Warned You About"), producer and humorist, cancer.
- Len Maddocks, 90, Australian cricketer.
- Leif Mæhle, 89, Norwegian literary historian.
- Zahid Malik, 78, Pakistani journalist and editor.
- William Ole Ntimama, 88, Kenyan politician, MP (2007–2014).
- Jon Polito, 65, American actor (Miller's Crossing, The Rocketeer, Homicide: Life on the Street), multiple myeloma.
- Emilio Prini, 73, Italian artist.
- Frans ten Bos, 79, Scottish rugby union player (national team).

=== 2 ===
- Nalinidhar Bhattacharya, 94, Indian poet and literary critic.
- Gloria Callen, 92, American swimmer.
- Neville Crowe, 79, Australian footballer.
- Gary D., 52, German trance producer and DJ, pulmonary embolism.
- Blackie Gejeian, 90, American race car driver and hot rod builder.
- Jerry Heller, 75, American music manager (N.W.A), heart attack.
- John Hostetter, 69, American actor (Murphy Brown, G.I. Joe: A Real American Hero, Heartbreak Ridge), complications from cancer.
- Islam Karimov, 78, Uzbek politician, President (since 1991), stroke.
- Gerald Lehner, 48, Austrian football referee.
- Ivan Mačák, 81, Slovak ethnomusicologist and organologist.
- Don Minnick, 85, American baseball player (Washington Senators).
- Margrit Mondavi, 91, Swiss-born American businesswoman, Vice President of Cultural Affairs at Robert Mondavi Winery.
- David Morgan, 56, Northern Irish television presenter and journalist.
- Antonina Seredina, 87, Soviet Russian sprint canoeist, Olympic champion (1960).
- Pat Walker, 97, American philanthropist.
- Joseph Whitney, 87, British-born Canadian geographer.
- Daniel Willems, 60, Belgian Olympic cyclist (1976).
- Chilla Wilson, 85, Australian rugby union player.
- Eileen Younghusband, 95, British World War II officer and author.

=== 3 ===
- Jack Aiken, 98, Australian politician.
- Mir Quasem Ali, 63, Bangladeshi businessman, politician and war criminal, execution by hanging.
- Maria Isabel Barreno, 77, Portuguese writer.
- Kalthoum Bornaz, 71, Tunisian screenwriter, film editor and director.
- Jane Brick, 74, Swedish journalist, brain tumor.
- Carlos Bulgheroni, 71, Argentine businessman, CEO of Bridas.
- Claudio Olinto de Carvalho, 74, Brazilian football player and coach (Cagliari).
- Anna Dewdney, 50, American children's author and illustrator, brain cancer.
- John W. Drummond, 96, American politician, member of the South Carolina Senate (1966–2008).
- Albert Hofstede, 75, American politician, Mayor of Minneapolis (1974–1975, 1978–1979), respiratory illness.
- Harry Hugasian, 87, American football player (Chicago Bears, Baltimore Colts).
- Sam F. Iacobellis, 87, American engineer.
- Jaakko Kolmonen, 75, Finnish chef.
- Pran Kurup, 49, Indian entrepreneur and author, heart failure.
- Norman Kwong, 86, Canadian football player (Calgary Stampeders, Edmonton Eskimos) and politician, Lieutenant Governor of Alberta (2005–2010).
- Leslie H. Martinson, 101, American film and television director (Batman: The Movie, CHiPs, Fantasy Island).
- Fred McFarlane, 55, American songwriter ("Show Me Love", "Don't Wanna Go Home"), record producer and musician.
- Dabney Montgomery, 93, American pilot (Tuskegee Airmen), bodyguard of Martin Luther King Jr.
- Richard Moore, 95, American politician.
- Jan Nilsen, 79, Norwegian footballer (Fredrikstad FK, national team).
- Peter Oresick, 60, American poet, brain cancer.
- Johnny Rebel, 77, American country singer.
- Vertamae Smart-Grosvenor, 79, American culinary anthropologist/griot, food writer and broadcaster on public media.
- Jean-Christophe Yoccoz, 59, French mathematician.

=== 4 ===
- Wilma Baker, 99, American animator (The Hunchback of Notre Dame, The Black Cauldron, FernGully: The Last Rainforest).
- Adam Bielański, 103, Polish chemist and professor.
- Bob Bissonnette, 35, Venezuelan-born Canadian singer, ice hockey player (Hull Olympiques, Acadie–Bathurst Titan) and baseball team owner (Québec Capitales), helicopter crash.
- Frank J. Barbaro, 88, American politician, member of the New York State Assembly (1973–1996), heart failure.
- Gintautas Iešmantas, 86, Lithuanian politician.
- Zvonko Ivezić, 67, Serbian footballer (Vojvodina, Sochaux, RC Paris).
- Peter Janich, 74, German philosopher, cancer.
- David Jenkins, 91, English cleric and theologian, Bishop of Durham (1984–1994).
- Klaus Katzur, 73, German swimmer, Olympic silver medalist (1972).
- Novella Matveyeva, 81, Russian poet and singer-songwriter.
- Ross McPherson, 77, New Zealand Olympic field hockey player.
- Richard Neville, 74, Australian writer and editor (Oz).
- Isidore Okpewho, 74, Nigerian novelist and critic.
- Cyril C. Perera, 93, Sri Lankan author.
- Clifford S. Perlman, 90, American businessman, CEO of Caesars Palace.
- Melvyn Pignon, 86, English field hockey player.
- John Prendergast, 85, Canadian football player (Calgary Stampeders).
- Clarence D. Rappleyea Jr., 82, American politician, member of the New York State Assembly (1973–1995).
- Zoran Šami, 67, Serbian politician, speaker at the Parliament of Serbia and Montenegro.
- Klaus Traube, 88, German mechanical engineer and anti-nuclear power activist.
- Yang Jingnian, 107, Chinese economist.

=== 5 ===
- John Ball, 81, English Anglican prelate, Assistant Bishop of Central Tanganyika.
- Arif Beg, 81, Indian politician, Bharatiya Janta Party leader.
- Gilbert Chapron, 83, French boxer, Olympic bronze medalist (1956).
- She'ar Yashuv Cohen, 88, Israeli chief rabbi of Haifa.
- Arline Garson, 89, American film editor (A Nightmare on Elm Street 2: Freddy's Revenge, House of Dark Shadows, Alone in the Dark).
- Duane Graveline, 85, American astronaut.
- Sir Fred Holliday, 80, British marine biologist.
- Jaroslav Jareš, 86, Czech football player and manager (Slavia Prague).
- Joe Hosteen Kellwood, 95, American World War II veteran, Navajo code talker.
- George McLeod, 83, Scottish footballer.
- Max Murray, 80, Scottish footballer (Rangers, West Bromwich Albion).
- Hugh O'Brian, 91, American actor (The Life and Legend of Wyatt Earp, The Shootist, Twins).
- Rudolph T. Randa, 76, American judge, U.S. District Court Judge for the Eastern District of Wisconsin (since 1992), brain cancer.
- Donald Ranvaud, 62, Italian-born British journalist and film producer (The Constant Gardener, Central Station, City of God), heart attack.
- Phyllis Schlafly, 92, American constitutional lawyer, conservative activist and author, cancer.
- Karl Schlechta, 94, Austrian football player and coach (Austria Wien, Sturm Graz, Rapid Wien).
- Michael Spindler 73, German businessman, CEO of Apple (1993–1996).
- Lindsay Tuckett, 97, South African Test cricketer.
- Israfil Yılmaz, 29, Turkish-born Dutch ISIS trainer, militant and blogger, airstrike.
- Hugh Zachary, 88, American author.

=== 6 ===
- John C. Bailar III, 83, American statistician.
- Richard Beeman, 74, American historian, amyotrophic lateral sclerosis.
- Cary Blanchard, 47, American football player (Indianapolis Colts, New York Jets).
- John Royston Coleman, 95, American university president (Haverford College), Parkinson's disease.
- Emlyn Davies, 94, Welsh rugby union player (Swansea, Aberavon, national team).
- H. Joel Deckard, 74, American politician, member of the United States House of Representatives from Indiana's 8th congressional district (1979–1983).
- Raymond Hide, 87, British physicist.
- Michael Ibru, 86, Nigerian businessman (Ibru Organization).
- Edward J. Lofgren, 102, American physicist.
- Nauyane Ariyadhamma Mahathera, 77, Sri Lankan Buddhist monk and author.
- George F. McLean, 87, American philosopher.
- Lewis Merenstein, 81, American record producer (Van Morrison), pneumonia.
- Dave Pacey, 79, English footballer (Luton Town).
- Alfredo Peña, 72, Venezuelan journalist and politician.
- Bernard Planque, 84, French Olympic basketball player
- Darren Seals, 29, American activist (Black Lives Matter), shot.
- Andrzej Szymczak, 67, Polish handball player, Olympic bronze medalist (1976).
- Robert Timberg, 76, American journalist (The Baltimore Sun) and writer (The Nightingale's Song).
- Lilian Uchtenhagen, 87, Swiss economist and politician.
- Koos van Ellinckhuijzen, 74, Namibian artist.
- Offlee Wild, 16, American Thoroughbred racehorse, heart attack.

=== 7 ===
- António Barbosa de Melo, 83, Portuguese lawyer and politician.
- José Barluenga, 76, Spanish chemist.
- Morton A. Bosniak, 86, American radiologist.
- D. J. Cameron, 83, New Zealand sports journalist.
- Bobby Chacon, 64, American boxer, world champion (1974–1975, 1982–1983), fall.
- Maria Costa, 89, Italian poet.
- Clifford Curry, 79, American beach music and R&B singer ("She Shot a Hole in My Soul").
- Bob Dailey, 63, Canadian ice hockey player (Vancouver Canucks, Philadelphia Flyers), cancer.
- Ignacy Dybała, 90, Polish footballer
- Massimo Felisatti, 84, Italian author and screenwriter (Silent Action, The Night Evelyn Came Out of the Grave).
- Ken Higgs, 79, English cricketer.
- Carl Hines, 85, American politician.
- Peter Kavanagh, 63, Canadian radio producer, creator of Canada Reads, heart attack.
- Joseph Keller, 93, American mathematician.
- Shyamala Pappu, 82, Indian lawyer.
- Norbert Schemansky, 92, American weightlifter, Olympic champion (1952).
- Jean-Louis Schneiter, 83, French politician, Mayor of Reims (1999–2008).
- Farhang Sharif, 84–85, Iranian musician and tar player.
- Graham Wiggins, 53, American musician.
- Kitty Xu Ting, 25, Chinese actress, lymphoma.
- Ye Xiushan, 81, Chinese philosopher.
- Vincent Zhu Wei-Fang, 90, Chinese Roman Catholic prelate, Bishop of Yongjia (since 2007).

=== 8 ===
- Hannes Arch, 48, Austrian race pilot, world champion (2008), helicopter crash.
- Johan Botha, 51, South African operatic tenor, cancer.
- Inga Clendinnen, 82, Australian historian.
- Jacques Dominati, 89, French politician.
- Hazel Douglas, 92, British actress (Harry Potter and the Deathly Hallows – Part 1).
- Sir Trevor Jones, 89, British politician.
- The Lady Chablis, 59, American actress (Midnight in the Garden of Good and Evil), pneumonia.
- Bert Llewellyn, 77, English footballer (Crewe, Port Vale, Wigan).
- William J. McCormack, 83, Mauritian-born Canadian police chief (Toronto Police Service).
- Antonio Nuzzi, 90, Italian Roman Catholic prelate, Archbishop of Sant'Angelo dei Lombardi-Conza-Nusco-Bisaccia (1981–1988) and Teramo-Atri (1988–2002).
- Dragiša Pešić, 62, Montenegrin politician, Prime Minister of Yugoslavia (2001–2003).
- Prince Buster, 78, Jamaican ska musician ("One Step Beyond", "Al Capone").
- Roman Romanchuk, 37, Ukrainian-born Russian boxer and kickboxer, heart attack.
- John Watts, 69, British politician, MP for Slough (1983–1997).
- Greta Zimmer Friedman, 92, American dental assistant, subject in V-J Day in Times Square photo.

=== 9 ===
- Chad Brown, 68, American football official (National Football League).
- Sylvia Gore, 71, English football player (national team) and manager (Wales national team), cancer.
- Luke Herrmann, 84, German-born British art historian.
- James Blyden Jenkins-Johnston, 69, Sierra Leonean lawyer.
- Koichi Kato, 77, Japanese politician, pneumonia.
- Lord Littlebrook, 87, British midget wrestler, trainer and booking manager.
- Zdeněk Měřínský, 68, Czech archeologist and historian.
- Carl Miles, 98, American baseball player (Philadelphia Athletics).
- Bill Nojay, 59, American politician, member of the New York State Assembly (since 2013), suicide by gunshot.
- Ben Press, 92, American tennis player, prostate cancer.
- James Siang'a, 67, Kenyan football player and manager (Gor Mahia, national team), diabetes.
- Mario Spezi, 71, Italian journalist and author (The Monster of Florence: A True Story).
- James Stacy, 79, American actor (Lancer, The Adventures of Ozzie and Harriet, Something Wicked This Way Comes), anaphylaxis.

=== 10 ===
- Robert E. Allen, 81, American business executive, CEO of AT&T (1988–1997), stroke.
- Horst Bergmann, 78, German Olympic wrestler.
- Giuliano Carnimeo, 84, Italian director (The Case of the Bloody Iris).
- Pyotr Devyatkin, 39, Kazakhstani Olympic ice hockey player (1998).
- Luis Eduardo González, 70, Uruguayan political scientist, cancer.
- Mahmut Hekimoğlu, 60, Turkish actor and film producer, prostate cancer.
- Väinö Koskela, 95, Finnish Olympic long-distance runner (1948, 1952), European championship bronze medalist (1950).
- Jutta Limbach, 82, German jurist and politician, President of the Federal Constitutional Court (1994–2002).
- Orie Loucks, 84, Canadian-born American zoologist.
- Frank Masley, 56, American Olympic luger (1980, 1984, 1988), cancer.
- Moose Morowski, 81, Canadian professional wrestler.
- Jure Radić, 62, Croatian civil engineer and politician, gastric cancer.
- Chris Stone, 81, American recording studio owner (Record Plant) and entrepreneur, heart attack and stroke.
- Mojmír Stuchlík, 86, Czech Olympic ski jumper
- Vladimír Vacátko, 63, German Olympic ice hockey player (1980).
- Joy Viado, 57, Filipino comedian and actress, heart attack.
- Joe Zaleski, 89, American-born Canadian football player and coach (Winnipeg Blue Bombers).

=== 11 ===
- İshak Alaton, 89, Turkish businessman (Alarko Holding), heart failure.
- Valeri Alikov, 56, Russian Hill Mari poet.
- Alexis Arquette, 47, American actress (The Wedding Singer, Pulp Fiction, Lords of Dogtown), cardiac arrest.
- Geert Bekaert, 88, Belgian architectural critic.
- Michel Bergerac, 84, French executive (Revlon).
- Wayne Bock, 82, American football player (Chicago Cardinals).
- Per Brandtzæg, 80, Norwegian physician.
- Lawrence D. Cohen, 83, American attorney, politician and judge, Mayor of St. Paul, Minnesota (1972–1976).
- Louis E. Crandall, 87, American printer and entrepreneur (Legend City).
- Beryl Crockford, 66, British rower, world champion (1985).
- Nelson Davidyan, 66, Armenian Soviet wrestler, Olympic silver medalist (1976).
- Ben Idrissa Dermé, 34, Burkinabe footballer (Sheriff Tiraspol, CA Bastia), heart attack.
- Mbaye-Jacques Diop, 80, Senegalese politician, member of the National Assembly (1983–2004), Mayor of Rufisque (1987–2002).
- Shigeru Itō, 88, Japanese politician.
- Let's Elope, 28, New Zealand Thoroughbred racehorse, Melbourne Cup winner (1991).
- Norman May, 88, Australian sports broadcaster.
- Claude-Jean Philippe, 83, French film critic and filmmaker.
- Bruno Poromaa, 80, Swedish politician, MP (1982–1994), municipal commissioner for Kiruna (1994–1998).
- Dalmiro Sáenz, 90, Argentine playwright.
- Bill Solomons, 83, Australian Olympic sailor (1968).
- Ken Sparkes, 76, Australian radio broadcaster, heart attack.
- Ricky Tosso, 56, Peruvian actor, cancer.
- Lyn Wilde, 93, American singer and actress.

=== 12 ===
- Gunnila Bernadotte, 93, Swedish countess.
- Tor Brustad, 89, Norwegian biophysicist.
- Ellen Burka, 95, Dutch-born Canadian figure skater and coach, Dutch national champion (1946, 1947).
- Sándor Csoóri, 86, Hungarian poet, essayist, writer, and politician.
- Edmund Edelman, 85, American politician.
- Ali Javan, 89, Iranian-American physicist, heart attack.
- Hidayat Inayat Khan, 99, English-French composer and conductor.
- Peter Pettalia, 61, American politician, member of the Michigan House of Representatives (since 2011), traffic collision.
- Tavín Pumarejo, 84, Puerto Rican actor, comedian and jíbaro singer.
- Fred Quillan, 60, American football player (San Francisco 49ers), NFL champion (1981, 1984).
- Arquimínio Rodrigues da Costa, 92, Portuguese Roman Catholic prelate, Bishop of Macau (1976–1988).
- Hans Rosander, 79, Swedish footballer (IFK Norrköping, national team), complications from heart surgery.
- William San Bento, 69, American politician, member of the Rhode Island House of Representatives (1993–2015).
- Stanley Sheinbaum, 96, American peace and human rights activist.
- Bob Wilkinson, 88, American football player (New York Giants), Parkinson's disease.

=== 13 ===
- Denis Atkins, 77, English footballer (Bradford City).
- Sunil Bardewa, 44, Nepalese pop singer.
- Artyom Bezrodny, 37, Ukrainian-born Russian footballer (Spartak Moscow), heart attack.
- Ottavio Bugatti, 87, Italian footballer (Napoli, Inter Milan).
- Matt Gray, 80, Scottish footballer (Third Lanark, Manchester City).
- Jack Hofsiss, 65, American stage director (The Elephant Man).
- Judith Jacobs, 77, American legislator, fall.
- Jeanne Lusher, 81, American physician.
- Alberto Moreno, 66, Cuban Olympic diver.
- Ermanno Rea, 89, Italian novelist, Viareggio Prize and Premio Campiello recipient.
- Jonathan Riley-Smith, 78, English medieval historian.
- Mike Roberts, 83, American radio sportscaster (New Mexico Lobos), cancer.
- Gérard Rondeau, 63, French photographer, cancer.
- Roy Rowan, 96, American journalist.
- Arnie Schmautz, 83, Canadian ice hockey player.
- Robert Sivertson, 91, American politician.
- Unto Valpas, 72, Finnish politician, MP (1999–2011).

=== 14 ===
- Valeriy Abramov, 60, Russian long-distance runner.
- Dick Adams, 96, American baseball player (Philadelphia Athletics).
- Don Buchla, 79, American synthesizer designer.
- Agostino Cossia, 79, Italian Olympic boxer.
- Max Dunbier, 78, Australian politician, member of the New South Wales Legislative Assembly for Campbelltown (1968–1971).
- Sir George Engle, 90, British barrister and civil servant.
- Lady Caroline Faber, 93, British aristocrat.
- Eduard Gusev, 80, Russian Soviet Olympic cyclist (1956).
- Kim McGuire, 60, American actress (Cry-Baby), pneumonia.
- Karl Gunnar Persson, 73, Swedish economic historian.
- Ron Polte, 84, American music manager.
- Dennis Shryack, 80, American screenwriter (Turner & Hooch, Pale Rider, Code of Silence), heart failure.
- Hilmar Thate, 85, German actor (Veronika Voss).
- James Westmoreland, 80, American actor (The Monroes, Don't Answer the Phone!, The Last Sunset).
- Dean White, 93, American billionaire advertiser and hotel developer.
- Richard Whittington-Egan, 91, British writer and criminologist.
- Gareth F. Williams, 61, Welsh author, cancer.

=== 15 ===
- Vera Cosgrave, 90, Irish public figure.
- Haron Din, 76, Malaysian politician, spiritual leader of PAS (since 2014), heart illness.
- Thelma Finlayson, 102, Canadian entomologist.
- John Gudenus, 75, Austrian politician and convicted Holocaust denier.
- Hikaru Iwasaki, 92, American photographer.
- Deborah S. Jin, 47, American physicist, cancer.
- Greg Maher, 49, Irish Gaelic football player (Mayo).
- Antonín Malinkovič, 86, Czech Olympic rower.
- Rose Mofford, 94, American politician, Governor of Arizona (1988–1991).
- Domingos Montagner, 54, Brazilian actor (Velho Chico), drowning.
- Robert H. Scott, 86, American lacrosse player and coach (Johns Hopkins Blue Jays).
- Haakon Sørbye, 96, Norwegian engineer and resistance member.

=== 16 ===
- Tarık Akan, 66, Turkish actor (Yol), cancer.
- Edward Albee, 88, American playwright (Who's Afraid of Virginia Woolf?, A Delicate Balance, The Goat, or Who Is Sylvia?), Tony (1963, 2002) and Pulitzer Prize winner (1967, 1975, 1994).
- Gabriele Amorth, 91, Italian Roman Catholic priest and exorcist, pulmonary disease.
- Don Bass, 70, American professional wrestler (CWA), cancer.
- Hagan Beggs, 79, Northern Irish-born Canadian actor (Danger Bay, Bordertown).
- Bill Bossio, 88, American Olympic boxer.
- Gilles Carpentier, 66, French author and editor.
- Carlo Azeglio Ciampi, 95, Italian banker and politician, President (1999–2006) and Prime Minister (1993–1994), multiple organ failure.
- Jerry Corbetta, 68, American musician (Sugarloaf), Pick's disease.
- Roger Doom, 81, French politician.
- Teodoro González de León, 90, Mexican architect.
- Reese Griffiths, 78, New Zealand rugby league player (West Coast, national team).
- Dorothy Cann Hamilton, 67, American chef and businesswoman, CEO of the International Culinary Center, traffic collision.
- Oļģerts Hehts, 84, Latvian basketball player.
- Charles H. Henry, 79, American physicist.
- Giancarlo Iliprandi, 91, Italian graphic designer.
- P. Kannan, 77, Indian politician.
- Todd Kimsey, 54, American actor (The Perfect Storm), lymphoma.
- W. P. Kinsella, 81, Canadian writer (Shoeless Joe), euthanasia.
- Norbert Kröcher, 66, German terrorist (2 June Movement), suicide by gunshot.
- Gérard Louis-Dreyfus, 84, French-born American businessman (Louis Dreyfus Company).
- Graeme MacKenzie, 81, Australian footballer, dementia.
- António Mascarenhas Monteiro, 72, Cape Verdean politician, President (1991–2001).
- John Bentley Mays, 75, Canadian journalist and novelist.
- Marvin Mottet, 86, American Roman Catholic priest.
- Gareth Powell, 82, Welsh writer.
- Qiao Renliang, 28, Chinese singer and actor, suicide by asphyxiation.
- Whitman Richards, 84, American cognitive scientist, complications from myelofibrosis.
- Severino Santiapichi, 90, Italian magistrate and writer.
- Jean-Paul Sauthier, 74, French Olympic field hockey player
- Joe Seng, 69, American politician, member of the Iowa House of Representatives (2001–2003) and Senate (since 2003), brain cancer.
- Hovhannes Tcholakian, 97, Turkish Armenian Catholic prelate, Archbishop of Istanbul (1967–2015).
- Bojja Tharakam, 77, Indian writer and social activist, brain tumour.
- Wang Mingfang, 63, Chinese politician, Chairman of CPPCC of Anhui Province (2011–2016).

=== 17 ===
- Theodore Wilbur Anderson, 98, American mathematician and statistician, heart failure.
- Clarence Brooks, 65, American football coach (Baltimore Ravens), esophageal and stomach cancer.
- Charmian Carr, 73, American actress and singer (The Sound of Music), complications from dementia.
- Desmond Clarke, 74, Irish philosopher.
- C. Martin Croker, 54, American voice actor and animator (Space Ghost Coast to Coast, Aqua Teen Hunger Force, The Brak Show), sepsis.
- Nigel Gardner, 83, British Olympic alpine skier.
- Bahman Golbarnezhad, 48, Iranian Paralympic racing cyclist (2012, 2016), race collision.
- Roman Ivanychuk, 87, Ukrainian writer.
- Rune Larsson, 92, Swedish athlete, Olympic bronze medalist (1948).
- Carmelo Morelos, 85, Filipino Roman Catholic prelate, Archbishop of Zamboanga (1994–2006).
- Hans Mühlethaler, 86, Swiss writer.
- Sigge Parling, 86, Swedish footballer (Djurgården), World Cup silver medalist (1958).
- Bob Suter, 88, Australian football player (Essendon).
- Rose Warfman, 99, French Holocaust survivor and member of the French Resistance.

=== 18 ===
- Stephanie Booth, 70, British hotelier, tractor collision.
- Joe Browder, 78, American environmental activist, cancer.
- Robert W. Cone, 59, American Army general, prostate cancer.
- John J. Craighead, 100, American wildlife scientist.
- Camille Dagenais, 95, Canadian engineer.
- Sir Nicholas Fenn, 80, British diplomat, High Commissioner to India (1991–1996).
- Robert L. Genillard, 87, Swiss businessman.
- Mary Grant, 88, Ghanaian politician.
- John Hall, 76, American politician, member of the Kentucky Senate (1987–1991).
- David Kyle, 97, American science fiction writer.
- Lee Ho-cheol, 84, South Korean writer.
- Mandoza, 38, South African kwaito musician, pharyngeal cancer.
- Tom Mintier, 68, American television journalist (CNN).
- Remigio Molina, 45, Argentine Olympic boxer (1992).
- Joan Patricia Murphy, 79, American politician, member of the Cook County Board of Commissioners (since 2002), breast cancer.
- Oddvar Nes, 77, Norwegian linguist.
- Rose Pak, 68, Chinese-born American political activist.
- András Prékopa, 87, Hungarian mathematician.
- Moïse Rahmani, 72, Belgian Sephardic author.
- Hassan Sharif, 65, Emirati artist, cancer.
- Tara Singh, 86, Indian sculptor.
- Lamuel A. Stanislaus, 95, Grenadian dentist and diplomat.
- Michel Vaxès, 75, French politician, member of the National Assembly for Bouches-du-Rhône (2007–2012).
- Wolfhart Zimmermann, 88, German physicist.

=== 19 ===
- Naser al-Raas, 33, Kuwaiti-born Canadian human rights activist, heart failure.
- Margaret Baird, 71, New Zealand immunologist.
- Burhanettin Bigalı, 89, Turkish general.
- Karl Dietrich Bracher, 94, German political scientist and historian.
- Bobby Breen, 88, Canadian-born American actor and singer.
- Gerwald Claus-Brunner, 44, German politician, suicide.
- Voula Damianakou, 102, Greek writer, translator.
- Mike Fellows, 59, American politician, traffic collision.
- Bill Glassford, 102, American football player and coach.
- Amin Yunis al Husseini, 86, Jordanian politician, Minister of Foreign Affairs and Social Welfare (1963–1965), Minister of Transport (1967–1970).
- Jan O. Karlsson, 77, Swedish politician, Minister for Foreign Affairs (2003), Minister for International Development Cooperation, Migration and Asylum Policy (2002–2003).
- Zerka T. Moreno, 99, Dutch-born American psychotherapist.
- Henri Niemegeerts, 94, Belgian Olympic field hockey player.
- Annie Pootoogook, 47, Canadian Inuk artist, drowned.
- Frank Raab, 95, American Naval officer and insurance executive.
- Jorge Rubinetti, 71, Argentine chess master.
- Fehmi Sağınoğlu, 78/79, Turkish footballer.
- Allister Sparks, 83, South African writer, journalist and political commentator.
- Frederick D. Tinsley, 76, American classical double bass player.
- Boris Trakhtenbrot, 95, Russian-Israeli mathematician.
- Amy van Singel, 66, American music journalist and radio host.
- Charley Warner, 76, American football player (Kansas City Chiefs, Buffalo Bills).

=== 20 ===
- Bill Barrett, 87, American politician, member of the United States House of Representatives from Nebraska's 3rd congressional district (1991–2001).
- Bernard Bergonzi, 87, British literary scholar.
- Betty Birch, 93, English cricketer.
- Vernon R. Boeckmann, 89, American politician.
- Curt Brunnqvist, 91, Swedish Olympic rower.
- Jean Chabbert, 95, French Roman Catholic prelate, Archbishop of Perpignan-Elne (1982–1996).
- Alan Cousin, 78, Scottish footballer (Dundee, Hibernian, Falkirk).
- Richie Dunn, 59, American ice hockey player (Buffalo Sabres, Calgary Flames, Hartford Whalers).
- Garry Edmundson, 84, Canadian ice hockey player (Toronto Maple Leafs).
- Jack Garman, 72, American computer engineer and NASA official, key figure in the Apollo 11 mission, bone marrow cancer.
- Paule Gauthier, 72, Canadian lawyer.
- Peter Leo Gerety, 104, American Roman Catholic prelate, Bishop of Portland (1969–1974) and Archbishop of Newark (1974–1986), world's oldest living Catholic bishop.
- Erwin Hahn, 95, American physicist.
- Curtis Hanson, 71, American film director and screenwriter (L.A. Confidential, 8 Mile, Wonder Boys), Oscar winner (1998).
- Dennis M. Jones, 78, American businessman (Jones Pharma).
- Terry Kohler, 82, American businessman, CEO of Vollrath (since 1982).
- Clive Kolbe, 72, South African cricketer.
- Yuri Korablin, 56, Russian politician and businessman, owner of Venezia F.C.
- Agniva Lahiri, 37, Indian LGBT activist, liver failure.
- Micki Marlo, 88, American singer and model.
- David McCay, 72, South African cricketer.
- Foil A. Miller, 100, American chemist and philatelist.
- Geno Morosi, 96, American World War II veteran.
- Edmund F. O'Connor, 94, American air force officer.
- Victor Scheinman, 73, American inventor.
- R. Heiner Schirmer, 74, German biochemist.
- Jim Semple, 81, Northern Irish businessman.

=== 21 ===
- Mahmadu Alphajor Bah, 40, Sierra Leonean footballer (Lokeren, Chunnam, Xiamen and national team), traffic collision.
- Régis Barailla, 83, French politician, member of National Assembly (1983–1993).
- Rosemary Barrow, 48, Welsh art historian.
- Linzy Cole, 68, American football player (Houston Oilers, Chicago Bears, Buffalo Bills).
- Leonidas Donskis, 54, Lithuanian philosopher and politician.
- Giuseppe Drago, 60, Italian politician, President of Sicily (1998), lung infection.
- Ragnar Hvidsten, 89, Norwegian footballer (Sandefjord, Skeid, national team).
- Shawty Lo, 40, American hip-hop musician (D4L), traffic collision.
- John D. Loudermilk, 82, American singer and songwriter ("Tobacco Road", "Then You Can Tell Me Goodbye", "Indian Reservation"), bone cancer.
- John Mulvaney, 90, Australian archaeologist.
- George T. Odom, 66, American actor (Straight Out of Brooklyn, The Hurricane, Law & Order).
- Tandra Quinn, 85, American actress (Problem Girls, Mesa of Lost Women, The Neanderthal Man) and model, cancer.
- Kalervo Rauhala, 85, Finnish wrestler, Olympic silver medalist (1952).
- Jack Rawlings, 93, English footballer (Hayes, Hendon).
- Earl Smith Jr., 51, American acid house musician (Phuture), complications from stroke.
- Richard D. Trentlage, 87, American advertising executive and jingle writer (Oscar Mayer, V8, National Safety Council), heart failure.
- Patricia Wakeling, 93, American journal editor (Applied Optics).

=== 22 ===
- Kjell Albin Abrahamson, 71, Swedish journalist (Sveriges Radio), stroke.
- Walter Bush, 86, American Hall of Fame ice hockey administrator (USA Hockey).
- Georges Fonghoro, 58, Malian Roman Catholic prelate, Bishop of Mopti (since 1999).
- Leonard I. Garth, 95, American federal judge, U.S. Court of Appeals for the Third Circuit (1973–1986), U.S. District Court for the District of New Jersey (1969–1973).
- Joseph Harmatz, 91, Lithuanian World War II Jewish partisan fighter and anti-Nazi avenger.
- Svein Gunnar Morgenlien, 94, Norwegian trade unionist and politician, MP (1975–1981).
- George Hanson, 81, American basketball coach (Minnesota Golden Gophers)
- Harry Lunn, 83, Canadian football player (Saskatchewan Roughriders, Ottawa Rough Riders, Hamilton Tiger-Cats).
- Len O'Shea, 96, Australian rules footballer (South Melbourne).
- Gian Luigi Rondi, 94, Italian screenwriter and film director.
- John Siddons, 88, Australian politician, Senator (1981–1983, 1985–1987).
- Ed Temple, 89, American track and field coach (Tennessee State Lady Tigers, women's Olympic team).
- Vincent Ward, 95, American paralympic swimmer.

=== 23 ===
- Marcel Artelesa, 78, French footballer (Monaco, Marseille).
- Yngve Brodd, 86, Swedish footballer (Toulouse, Sochaux-Montbéliard, IFK Göteborg).
- Fern Buchner, 87, American makeup artist (All the President's Men, The Addams Family, Edward Scissorhands).
- David Coleman, 74, English footballer (Colchester United), cancer.
- Peter Collingwood, 96, British-born Australian actor (Picnic at Hanging Rock).
- Frances Dafoe, 86, Canadian pair skater, Olympic silver medalist (1956), world champion (1954, 1955).
- Nan Fry, 71, American poet.
- Arnold Green, 83, New Zealand rugby league player (West Coast, national team).
- Carolyn Hardy, 86, British horticulturalist.
- Larry Harmon, 75, American soccer coach.
- Bill Johnson, 92, New Zealand actor.
- Stephen Lawn, 50, British medical researcher, glioblastoma.
- Rudi Lüttge, 93, German Olympic racewalker (1952).
- Jeff Mackintosh, 45, Canadian graphic artist and game designer (Sailor Moon, Silver Age Sentinels), glioblastoma multiforme.
- Max Mannheimer, 96, Czech-born German painter, author and Holocaust survivor.
- Herman Joseph Sahadat Pandoyoputro, 77, Indonesian Roman Catholic prelate, Bishop of Malang (1989–2016).
- Michel Rousseau, 80, French cyclist, Olympic champion (1956).
- Andrzej Tarkowski, 83, Polish embryologist.

=== 24 ===
- Christoph Albrecht, 86, German organist and conductor.
- Donald Cartridge, 81, English cricketer (Hampshire).
- Mel Charles, 81, Welsh footballer (Swansea, Arsenal, national team).
- Sandra Chastain, 79, American author.
- James Crowden, 88, British Olympic rower (1952).
- Andy Gambucci, 87, American ice hockey player, Olympic silver medallist (1952).
- Vladimir Kuzmichyov, 37, Russian footballer, traffic collision.
- Wenche Lowzow, 90, Norwegian LGBT activist and politician, MP (1977–1985).
- Arne Melchior, 91, Danish politician, MP (1973–1975, 1977–2001), Transport Minister (1982–86).
- Klaus Moje, 79, German-Australian artist.
- Bill Mollison, 88, Australian researcher, author, teacher and biologist.
- Jack Nadel, 92, American entrepreneur and author.
- Bill Nunn, 63, American actor (Do the Right Thing, Spider-Man, Sister Act), leukemia.
- Matti Pulli, 83, Finnish ski jumping coach, Parkinson's disease.
- Jacek Andrzej Rossakiewicz, 59, Polish painter.
- Buckwheat Zydeco, 68, American accordionist and bandleader, lung cancer.

=== 25 ===
- Rudy Andabaker, 88, American football player (Pittsburgh Steelers).
- Jean Boissonnat, 87, French journalist.
- David Budbill, 76, American poet and playwright, Parkinson's disease.
- Henning Enoksen, 80, Danish footballer, Olympic silver medalist (1960).
- José Fernández, 24, Cuban-born American baseball player (Miami Marlins), boat collision.
- Dawn Hampton, 88, American cabaret and jazz singer, saxophonist, dancer and songwriter (Malcolm X).
- Hermione Harvey, 85, English actress and dancer.
- Nahed Hattar, 56, Jordanian writer, shot.
- Peter Henderson, 87, Australian public servant.
- Hughie Jones, 89, British Anglican priest, Archdeacon of Loughborough (1986–1992).
- Kashif, 59, American musician (B.T. Express) and record producer.
- Hans Korte, 87, German actor (Spider's Web).
- Hagen Liebing, 55, German musician (Die Ärzte), brain tumour.
- K. Madhavan, 101, Indian politician.
- René Marsiglia, 57, French football player and manager (Lille, Nice).
- Victor Munden, 88, English cricketer (Leicestershire).
- Bertie O'Hanlon, 91, Irish rugby union player.
- David Padilla, 89, Bolivian politician, President (1978–1979).
- Arnold Palmer, 87, American Hall of Fame professional golfer.
- Jean Shepard, 82, American honky tonk singer-songwriter ("A Dear John Letter", "Slippin' Away"), Parkinson's disease.
- Sir Patrick Sissons, 71, British physician.
- Joseph Sitruk, 71, Tunisian-born French rabbi.
- Rod Temperton, 66, British songwriter ("Boogie Nights", "Always and Forever", "Thriller") and musician, cancer.
- Robert Weinberg, 70, American science fiction author.
- Anthony Xu Ji-wei, 81, Chinese clandestine Roman Catholic prelate, Bishop of Taizhou (since 2010).

=== 26 ===
- Taz Anderson, 77, American football player (St. Louis Cardinals, Atlanta Falcons).
- Richard Bishop, 66, American football player (New England Patriots).
- Don Brothwell, 83, British archaeologist.
- Giambattista Capretti, 70, Italian Olympic boxer (1968, 1972).
- Joe Clay, 78, American rockabilly musician.
- Jack Cotton, 91, American basketball player (Denver Nuggets).
- Mark Dvoretsky, 68, Russian chess player and trainer.
- Giacomo Fornoni, 76, Italian racing cyclist, Olympic gold medalist (1960).
- Hans Hoffmeister, 80, German Olympic water polo player.
- Etim Inyang, 84, Nigerian policeman.
- Jack Kirrane, 88, American ice hockey player, Olympic gold medalist (1960).
- Lee Kwang-jong, 52, South Korean football player and coach, leukemia.
- Herschell Gordon Lewis, 90, American film director (Blood Feast, Two Thousand Maniacs!).
- Jens Lothe, 84, Norwegian physicist.
- Wilhelm Mohr, 99, Norwegian aviation officer.
- Ioan Gyuri Pascu, 55, Romanian singer, producer, actor and comedian, heart attack.
- Curtis Roosevelt, 86, American writer, heart attack.
- Jan van Ruiten, 85, Dutch politician, member of the House of Representatives (2002–2003).
- Karel Růžička, 76, Czech jazz pianist, Anděl Award winner (1993).
- Jackie Sewell, 89, English footballer (Notts County, Sheffield Wednesday, Aston Villa).
- Toughie, Panamanian frog, last surviving of the Rabbs fringe-limbed treefrog.
- George Willi, 92, American judge.

=== 27 ===
- Jamshid Amouzegar, 93, Iranian politician, Prime Minister (1977–1978), Minister of Finance (1965–1974).
- Jef Billings, 71, American costume designer.
- Jonathan David Brown, 60, American record producer and audio engineer.
- Jacob Buksti, 69, Danish politician, Minister of Transport (2000–2001).
- Randy Duncan, 79, American gridiron football player and lawyer.
- Syed Shamsul Haque, 81, Bangladeshi poet and writer.
- Ronald King Murray, Lord Murray, 94, Scottish politician and jurist, Lord Advocate (1974–1979).
- Phil C. Neal, 97, American legal scholar.
- Paddy O'Flaherty, 73, Northern Irish broadcaster.
- Luis Ossio, 86, Bolivian politician, Vice President (1989–1993).
- Sebastian Papaiani, 80, Romanian film and television actor.
- Janet Polinsky, 85, American politician.
- Jean-Louis Ravelomanantsoa, 73, Malagasy Olympic athlete (1964, 1968, 1972).
- Charles Schultze, 91, American economist and public policy analyst, complications from sepsis.
- Hannan Shah, 74, Bangladeshi politician and army officer.
- Tony Swartz, 73, American actor (Battlestar Galactica).
- Serigne Abdou Thiam, 21, Qatari footballer (Al-Khor), cancer.
- Haruko Wakita, 82, Japanese historian.
- Rod Woodward, 72, Canadian football player (Ottawa Rough Riders).

=== 28 ===
- Chamsulvara Chamsulvarayev, 32, Russian-born Azeri Olympic freestyle wrestler (2008) and ISIS terrorist, air strike.
- Joseph V. Charyk, 96, Canadian-born American engineer, Under Secretary of the Air Force (1960–1963).
- Wanita Dokish, 80, American baseball player (Rockford Peaches).
- Seamus Dunne, 86, Irish footballer (Luton Town, national team).
- Ann Emery, 86, British actress (Billy Elliot, Julia Jekyll and Harriet Hyde).
- Johan Fischerström, 72, Swedish Olympic handball player.
- Werner Friese, 70, German footballer (GDR national team).
- Gary Glasberg, 50, American television producer and writer (NCIS, Crossing Jordan, Bones).
- John F. Good, 80, American FBI agent who created the Abscam sting operation.
- Graham Hawkins, 70, English football player (Wolverhampton Wanderers, Blackburn Rovers) and manager.
- Michael Javed, 65, Pakistani politician, heart attack.
- Malcolm Lucas, 89, American judge, Chief Justice of the California Supreme Court (1987–1996), U.S. District Court Judge for the Central District of California (1971–1984).
- Larkin Malloy, 62, American actor (The Edge of Night, Guiding Light, All My Children) and announcer, complications from a heart attack.
- Melvin Earl Maron, 92, American computer scientist.
- Sreten Mirković, 58, Serbian boxer, lung cancer.
- Gloria Naylor, 66, American novelist (The Women of Brewster Place), heart attack.
- Agnes Nixon, 93, American television writer and producer (One Life to Live, All My Children, Guiding Light).
- Shimon Peres, 93, Polish-born Israeli statesman, President (2007–2014), Prime Minister (1977, 1984–1986, 1995–1996), Nobel Laureate (1994), stroke.
- Timothy Pesci, 72, American politician, member of the Pennsylvania House of Representatives (1989–2000).
- Fred J. Schraeder, 92, American politician.
- Max Walker, 68, Australian Test cricketer and football player, myeloma.

=== 29 ===
- Raúl Águila, 86, Chilean footballer.
- John C. Beck, 92, American physician and academic, pulmonary embelism.
- Terence Brady, 77, British writer (Upstairs, Downstairs) and actor.
- Jerry Bronger, 80, American politician.
- Cheng Yu-tung, 91, Hong Kong businessman (Chow Tai Fook).
- Nora Dean, 72, Jamaican singer.
- Miriam Defensor Santiago, 71, Filipino politician and judge, Senator (1995–2001, 2004–2016), International Criminal Court Judge (2012–2014), lung cancer.
- Gilles Dubé, 89, Canadian ice hockey player (Detroit Red Wings, Montreal Canadiens).
- Hidden Lake, 23, American thoroughbred racehorse, euthanized.
- Shirley Jaffe, 93, American painter and sculptor.
- Kazuyo Kato, 84, Japanese Olympic sport shooter.
- Jim Kilroy, 94, American sport-sailor and maxi yacht racer.
- Joni Madraiwiwi, 59, Fijian lawyer and politician, Vice President of Fiji (2004–2006), Chief Justice of the Supreme Court of Nauru (since 2014).
- Herbert Martin, 91, German footballer (1. FC Saarbrücken, Saarland national team).
- Sandra Morgen, 66, American feminist anthropologist.
- Ashok Pai, 69, Indian psychiatrist and film producer, cardiac arrest.
- Isabel Piczek, 88, Hungarian ecclesiastical artist.
- Joseph Verner Reed Jr., 78, American banker and diplomat.
- Mark Ricks, 92, American politician, Lieutenant Governor of Idaho (2006–2007) and State Senator (1979–1994).
- Anthony Ryle, 89, English medical doctor.
- Otto ter Haar, 73, Dutch Olympian
- Laura Troschel, 71, Italian actress (Four Flies on Grey Velvet), singer, and model.
- Ralph V. Whitworth, 60, American businessman, cancer.
- Brahim Zniber, 96, Moroccan businessman and vintner.

=== 30 ===
- George Barris, 94, American photographer (Marilyn Monroe).
- Ted Benoit, 69, French comics artist and graphic novelist.
- Gordon Borrie, Baron Borrie, 85, English lawyer and life peer.
- Charles Brading, 81, American politician, member of the Ohio House of Representatives (1993–2000).
- Oscar Brand, 96, Canadian-born American folk singer-songwriter, author and radio broadcaster (WNYC).
- Norman Cafik, 87, Canadian politician.
- Michael Casswell, 53, English guitarist, drowned.
- Herawati Diah, 99, Indonesian journalist.
- Paul Frantz, 89, French football player and manager (Strasbourg).
- Frederic C. Hamilton, 89, American oilman and arts philanthropist.
- Hanoi Hannah, 85, Vietnamese radio personality.
- Arthur Harnden, 92, American sprinter, Olympic gold medalist (1948).
- Joyce Hazeltine, 81, American politician.
- Bjarni Jónsson, 96, Icelandic mathematician.
- Lilleba Lund Kvandal, 76, Norwegian opera singer.
- H. Pierre Noyes, 92, American theoretical physicist.
- Mike Towell, 25, Scottish professional boxer, injuries sustained in a bout.
- Jim Zapp, 92, American baseball player (Baltimore Elite Giants).
