= Israfil (name) =

Origin
- Origin: Arabic
- Meaning: "worshipper of God"

Other names
- Alternative spelling: Israfel, Israfeel, Israphael
- Related names: Abdullah, Abid, Abdiel, Abdeel, Abdi, Ovadia, Obadiah, Ubayd Allah, Raphael

Israfil (Arabic: إِسْرَافِيْل), also spelled Israfel and Israfeel, is an Arabic given name taken from the name of an archangel in Islamic belief named "Israfil," usually identified with the biblical archangel Raphael. Notable people with the name include:

- Israfil Alam (1966–2020), Bangladeshi politician
- Israfil Abbasli (1938–2013), Azerbaijani scientist
- Israfil Mammadov (1919–1946), Azerbaijani Red Army lieutenant
- "Israfil" Salih Yılmaz (1987– disappeared 2016), Turkish–Dutch Islamist militant
- Israfil Shahverdiyev (1952–1994), national hero of Azerbaijan
- Israfil Ashurly (born 1969), Azerbaijani mountaineer
- Israfil Israfilov (1892/93–1946), Russian military officer
- Israfeel Kohistani (born 1987), Afghan footballer
