= Maria Costa =

Maria Costa may refer to:

- Maria Costa (poet) (1926–2016), Italian poet
- Maria Costa (actress), seen in Dangerous Minds
- Maria da Costa (1931–2002), Olympic freestyle swimmer from Brazil
- Maria da Paixão da Costa (born 1960), East Timorese politician
- Maria Della Costa (1926–2015), Brazilian actress and producer
- Maria Fernanda Costa (born 2002), Brazilian swimmer
- Maria Ludovica Costa, Italian rower
- Maria Velho da Costa (1938–2020), Portuguese writer
- Maria Costa (ski mountaineer) (born 2002), Spanish ski mountaineer
