= Naresh Dev Pant =

Graphic designer and artist

- देव नरेश
- Born: 22 February 1974 (age 52); Kathmandu, Nepal
- Occupations: Producer, Director, songwriter; Owner of Mauree Entertainment Pvt. Ltd.
- Spouse: Nira Pant
- Children: Son Amurta Dev Pant; Daughter Anani Pant

Naresh Dev Pant (Nepali: देव नरेश; born 1974), popularly known as Dev Naresh, is a Nepalese graphic designer, muralist, painter, filmmaker, photographer, and web designer. He has worked as a freelancer photographer since 2013.

== Early life ==
Since his early days, Naresh was very fond of writing poems. He used to read poems on radio. Naresh finished his schooling from Padmodaya School. He has done various theatre acts as well as TV serials since his young age.

== Personal life ==
Naresh finished his education from Shanker Dev Campus. He studied Master of Business Administration (MBA). He fell in love with Nira Pant and later they got married. Naresh and Nira got married in May of the year 2002, and they have a son "Amurta Dev Pant" and a daughter "Anani Pant".

== Career ==
=== Lyricist ===
Naresh's first lyrics were sung by famous Pop Singer Nabin K Bhattarai. The song name was "Bajauda bajaudai". Some of his award winning songs are:

Year	Song	Singer
1996	Bajauda Bajaudai	Nabin K Bhattarai
	Na Aau Mero Najik	Tsering Bhutia and Sukmit Gurung
	Goreto Ani Ustai Cha Galli	Sunil Bardewa
	Dobato	Nabin K Bhattarai

=== Director/Producer ===
He has produced different series as well as movies. As a director he has received huge recognition with his short movie "The Job Application" which was screened at Cannes Film Festival. Some of his Movies and Series include:
1) Director of short movie "The Job Application" in 2010
2) Produced the TV Series "Saturday Showcase" from 2010-2011
3) Producer of upcoming movie "Tata Bye Bye" due to be released in 2015
4) Producer of upcoming movie "Rangeen Manasaya"

He also owns Mauree Entertainment Pvt. Ltd. which was the Distributor of Mary Kom (film) in Nepal (2014).

=== Radio Presenter ===
Naresh worked as a radio presenter in Hits FM 91.2 from 2000 to 2008

=== Actor ===
Naresh has also worked as an actor in Kathmandu, one of the Nepal Television's most successful shows ever, in 2002.
