= Jack Nadel International =

Promotional merchandise distribution company

- Company type: Private
- Industry: Promotional products
- Founded: 1953
- Headquarters: Los Angeles, California, United States
- Key people: Jack Nadel; Craig Nadel
- Products: Promotional items
- Website: www.nadel.com

Jack Nadel International is a promotional merchandise distribution company founded in 1953 by Jack Nadel. Based in Los Angeles, CA, Jack Nadel International is one of the top distributors of promotional merchandise in the United States.

== Company history ==
The company was founded in 1953 by Jack Nadel in Culver City, CA. Current president and CEO, Craig Nadel, started with the company in 1983 and became president in 2006. Marty Nadel was president of the company from 1971 to 2006.

In the 1970s, Jack Nadel began working with companies in both Italy and France, including a licensing deal with Pierre Cardin.

Jack Nadel International created the Marty Nadel Scholarship Fund for children of D.A.R.E. Instructors.
