= Len O'Shea =

Australian rules footballer

Personal information
- Full name: Leonard Leslie O'Shea
- Born: 23 January 1920; Melbourne, Victoria
- Died: 22 September 2016 (aged 96); Gold Coast, Queensland
- Height: 178 cm (5 ft 10 in)
- Weight: 70 kg (154 lb)

Playing career^{1}
Years	Club	Games (Goals)
1944	South Melbourne	2 (1)
- ^{1} Playing statistics correct to the end of 1944.

Leonard Leslie O'Shea (23 January 1920 – 22 September 2016) was an Australian rules footballer who played with South Melbourne in the Victorian Football League (VFL).

Prior to playing with South Melbourne, O'Shea served in the Australian Army during World War II.
