= Jean-Paul Sauthier =

French field hockey player

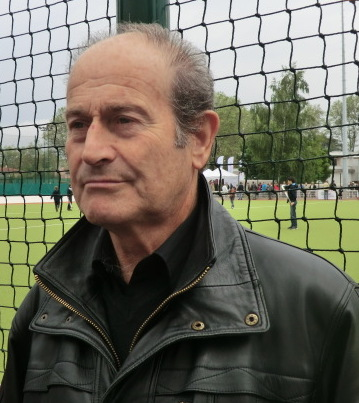
- Jean-Paul Sauthier in 2013

Personal information
- Nationality: French
- Born: 27 May 1942 Lyon, France
- Died: 16 September 2016 (aged 74)

Sport
- Sport: Field hockey

Jean-Paul Sauthier (27 May 1942 – 16 September 2016) was a French field hockey player. He competed at the 1968 Summer Olympics and the 1972 Summer Olympics.
