= Jacek Andrzej Rossakiewicz =

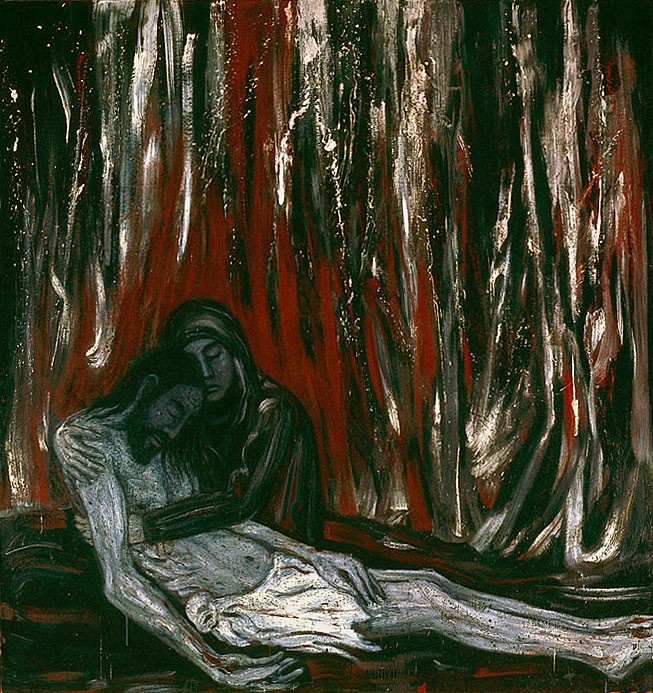
Pietà oil on canvas, 200x190 cm, 1990 Musée d'Art Contemporain de Dunkerque

Jacek Andrzej Rossakiewicz (16 October 1956 – 24 September 2016) was a Polish painter, theoretician of art, philosopher and interior architect.

== Biography ==
His first paintings were created in the 1980s. The paintings were inspired by the Pure Form Theory of Stanisław Ignacy Witkiewicz (Witkacy) and entrenched in the tradition of 20th century European art. Beginning in 1985, J.A.R. showed in his paintings the social and political context associated with the criticism of Martial law in Poland (Dec. 1980). The contemplation of the different functions of this art led to the artist's formulation of the theory Art as Freedom (1985). Mostly inspired by Witkacy's grasp of the visible universe, in which the composition introduced the intended and directional tension, led Rossakiewicz to one interpretation of reality. The continuation of this philosophy led him in 1987 to the manifestation of social problems in his art. The next chapter of his art, The Everlasting Art, - 1989 was directly inspired from readings of the Old and New Testament. After 1989, Rossakiewicz started to create a series of evangelical paintings: Passion of Dunkirk and Saint John Passion. The Passion of Dunkirk is in the collection at the Modern Art Museum in Dunkirk, France.

He died 24 September 2016.

Rossakiewicz about his art: "In my understanding, to express man's spiritual life is to create art. The subject of the painting doesn’t matter. But the art has to originate in the inside, it has to be a result of man's life experiences. It cannot be simply planned; how to shock, how to draw attention to one's self, it cannot be done for money either. Because the spiritual and emotional state of an artist while painting, or working on a different work of art, is encoded in the painting and this energy is emanating from it."

== Saint John Passion ==
The cycle of 15 paintings (oil on canvas, 245x140 cm) with the prologue: The Transfiguration

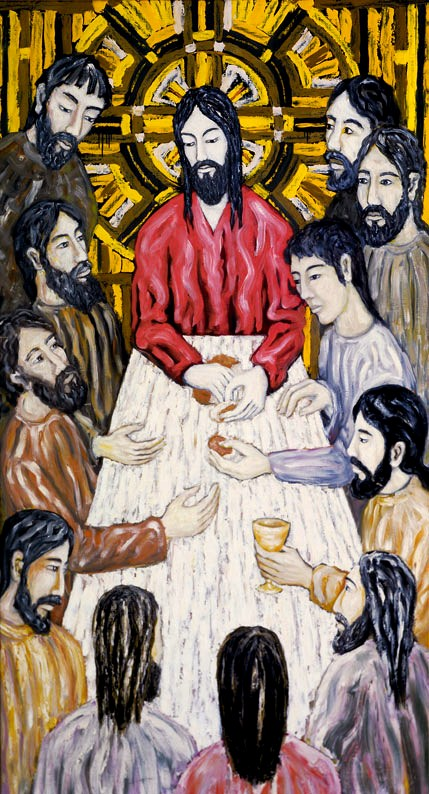
The Last Supper, 1989 (1), the classic composition was replaced by positioning the table vertically, which subconsciously suggested the shape of crucifix.

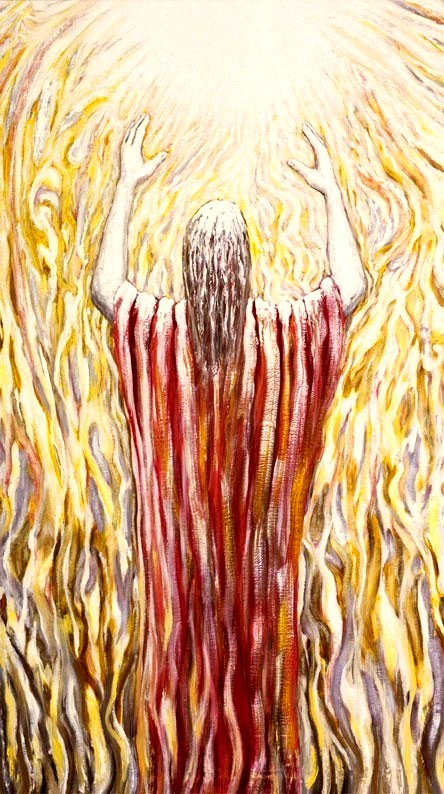
The Prayer of Jesus, 1990 (3)

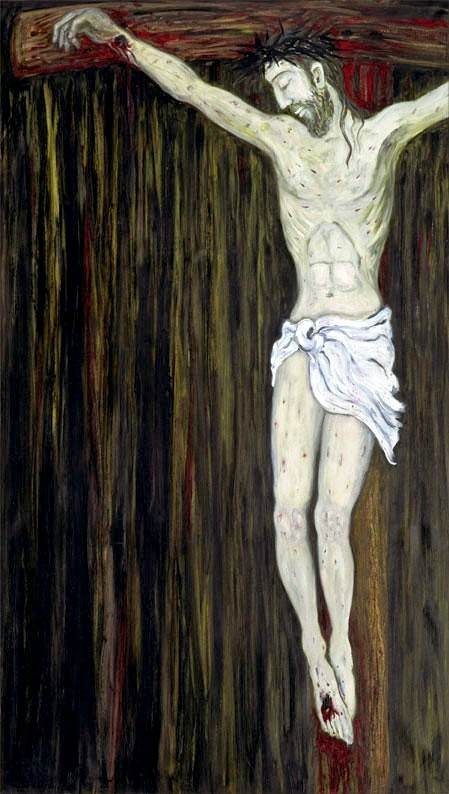
The Crucifixion, 2000 (6), Painted in ancient olive green – color choosing was inspired by biblical sentence: “For if men do these things when the tree is green, what will happen when it is dry?” (Luke, 23:31)

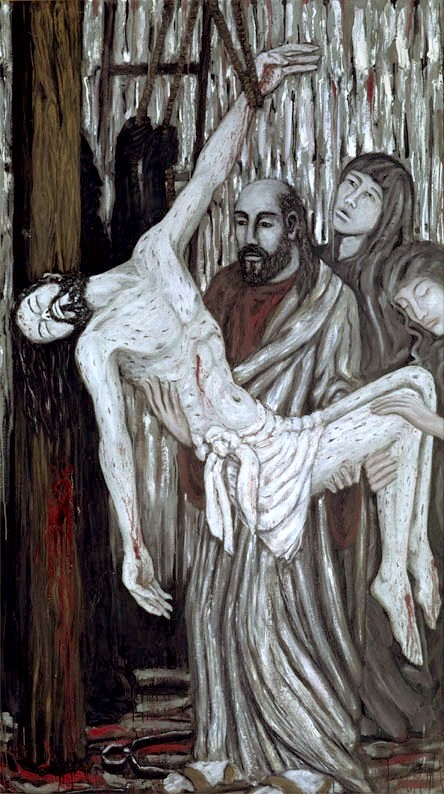
The Deposition, 1990 (7), Painting dominant color is also green – but muted. There is no life in ‘HIM’ anymore.

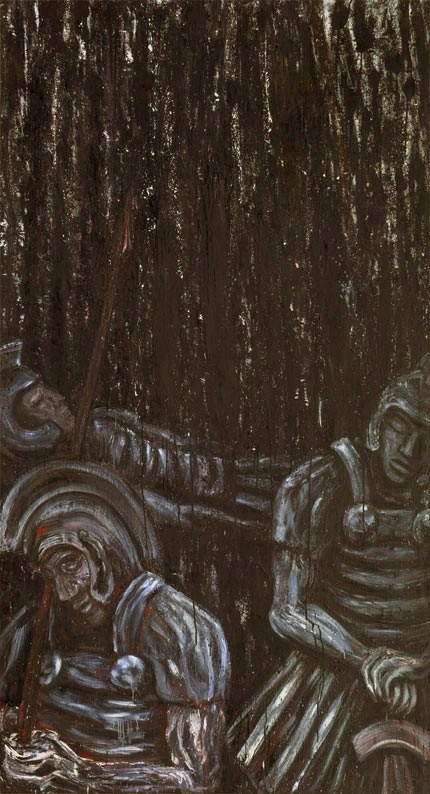
The Tomb Guards, 1990 (8), The painting is a depiction of total destruction. The paint was scraped off and burnt – symbolizing the artist's view of modernity.

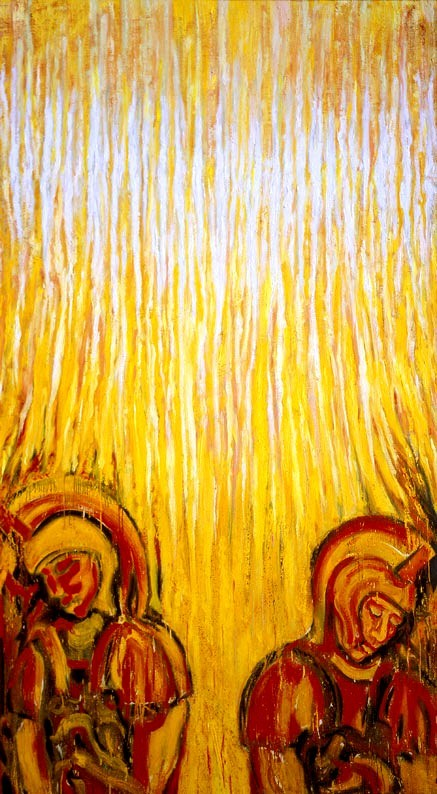
The Angel of the Lord, 1990 (9)

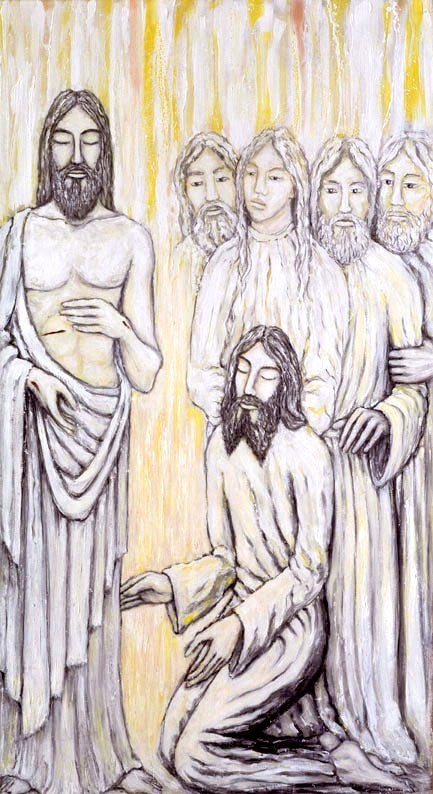
Jesus Appears to Thomas, 1990 (13)

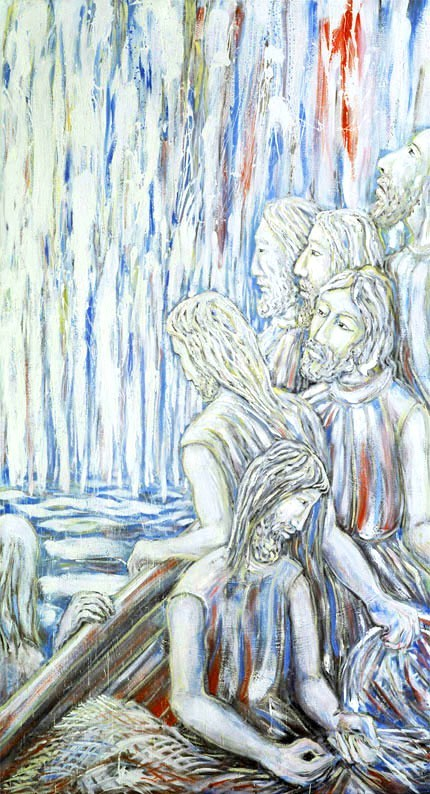
By the Sea of Tiberias, 1990 (14)
