= Moïse Rahmani =

Belgian writer (1944–2016)

- Born: 29 August 1944; Cairo
- Died: 19 September 2016 (aged 72); Brussels
- Resting place: Cimetière de Wezembeek-Oppem
- Occupations: author, editor, publisher
- Organization: Institut Sepharade Europeen
- Known for: Los Muestros magazine
- Website: moise.sefarad.org

Moïse Rahmani (29 August 1944 – 18 September 2016) was a Belgian Sephardic author, editor, and publisher of Los Muestros (Ladino-French-English language) magazine.

== Biography ==
Rahmani was born in Cairo, Egypt into a Jewish family. His Jewish paternal grandmother was from Rhodes. He grew up in the Heliopolis district.

In 1956, at the age of 12, he and his family left for the then Belgian Congo, where a Greek-Sephardic Jewish community already existed. His family emigrated during the Congo Crisis of 1960–1966.

A resident of Belgium since 1980, Rahmani worked as a diamond dealer.

In 1990, he founded the Institut Sefarade European and launched the quarterly review Los Muestros (“Our Kin”), which published news of Sephardic communities around the world. The review published in three languages–French, English, and Ladino–as testified by its three-language subtitle: "La voix des Séphardes," "The Sephardic Voice," and "La boz de los Sefardim."

Los Muestros ceased publication in 2015 due to a combinations of Rahmani's fatigue, declining health, and finances.

== Death ==
Rahmani died on 18 September 2016 in Brussels after a long illness.

His funeral was held at the Cimetière de Wezembeek-Oppem on 22 September 2016.

== Works ==
Rahmani researched and wrote numerous publications on the Jewish community of the Belgian Congo. (Many Jewish families left their ancestral homes of Rhodes in the early 20th century and immigrated to various part of the world, including the Belgian Congo.)

He wrote in three languages. He published the following books (in French):

- Rhodes, un pan de notre mémoire (2000): homage to the birthplace of his paternal grandmother on the Aegean Island of Rhodes
- Shalom Bwana, la saga des Juifs du Congo (2002)
- Les Juifs du soleil, portraits de Sépharades de Belgique (2002)
- L’Exode oublié, Juifs des pays arabes (2003)
- La Réponse de Noa (2003)
- Lettre à un frère (2007)
- Juifs du Congo La Confiance et l’Espoir (2007)
- Tu choisiras le rire (2008)
- 14 ans, 4 mois, 6 jours (2009)
- Juifs en terre d’Islam, une minorité opprimée (2009)
- Une pierre pour l’éternité (2010)
- Rodi, una parte della nostra memoria (2012)

== Legacy ==
In 2014, King Felipe VI of Spain sent personal wishes for the 25th anniversary of Los Muestros.

In 2015, Rahmani said of his own concept of Convivencia, "In my ideal community, I would no longer be amazed if the head of the Hebrew State visits an Arab country, nor if one of his counterparts visits Israel."

In September 2016, the Centre Communautaire Laïc Juif David Susskind remembered Rahman as a "pillar of the Sephardic community in Brussels, the Jews of Rhodes and memory of Congo" ("Pilier de la communauté sépharade de Bruxelles, mémoire des Juifs de Rhodes et du Congo").

== See also ==
- Ladino
- La Convivencia
- Alhambra Decree
- Sephardic Jews
