= Otto ter Haar =

Dutch hockey player

Personal information
- Nationality: Dutch
- Born: 9 August 1943 Hilversum, Netherlands
- Died: 29 September 2016 (aged 73)

Sport
- Sport: Field hockey

Otto ter Haar (9 August 1943 – 29 September 2016) was a Dutch field hockey player. He competed in the men's tournament at the 1968 Summer Olympics.
