= Jack Nadel =

American author and entrepreneur (1923–2016)

- Born: October 4, 1923; New York City, New York
- Died: September 24, 2016 (aged 92); Santa Barbara, California
- Occupations: Entrepreneur; author; philanthropist

Jack Nadel (October 4, 1923 – September 24, 2016) was an American author, entrepreneur and proponent of ethics in business. He was the founder and chairman of Jack Nadel International and was the host of the television show "Out of the Box with Jack Nadel", created and produced by Brooke Halpin, broadcast on KEYT TV (CBS) in Santa Barbara.

== Early life ==
While enlisted with the United States Army Air Forces in 1945, Jack Nadel was the navigator and radar officer on the B-29 Superfortress during World War II where he completed 27 missions over Japan. He is the recipient of multiple medals including the Distinguished Flying Cross.

== Career ==
Nadel's career in exports began in 1946 through the buying and selling of surplus U.S. Army materials. He founded Jack Nadel International in 1953, building a $100-million firm by marketing abroad. In the 1970s, Jack Nadel began working with investors in Italy and France, eventually leading to a licensing deal with Pierre Cardin.

Nadel's third book, How to Succeed in Business Without Lying, Cheating, or Stealing, was published in 1993 and focuses on morality-based business practices. Nadel died at the age of 92 on September 24, 2016.

== Philanthropy ==
- The Julie and Jack Nadel Scholarship Fund for Young Entrepreneurs for Spark & Hustle students
- Sansum Clinic donors for Obstetrics and Gynecology Department
- Member of Sansum Clinic Partners Circle
- Founder of The Nadel Foundation
- Elly Nadel Music Therapy Program

== Publications ==
- Cracking the Global Market (1987)
- Passport to Prosperity: Tales of a Yankee Trader (1989)
- There's No Business Like Your Business (2000)
- How To Succeed In Business Without Lying Cheating or Stealing (2000)
- My Enemy, My Friend (2000)
- Use What You Have to Get What You Want (2011)
- The Evolution of an Entrepreneur (2012)
