= Richard Moore (Tennessee politician) =

American lawyer and politician

Richard T. Moore

Member of the Tennessee Senate from the 29th district
- In office 1957-1959

Member of the Tennessee House of Representatives from the Tennessee House of Representatives district
- In office 1953-1957

Personal details
- Born: September 9, 1920 Newbern, Tennessee, U.S.
- Died: September 3, 2016 (aged 95) Newbern, Tennessee, U.S.
- Education: Vanderbilt University (BA, JD); Harvard Business School (MBA)
- Occupation: lawyer

Richard T. Moore (September 9, 1920 - September 3, 2016) was an American lawyer and politician.

Born in Newbern, Tennessee, Moore went to the Vanderbilt University and Harvard Business School. He served in the Tennessee House of Representatives from 1953 to 1957 and in the Tennessee Senate from 1957 to 1959 as a Democrat.
