= Sunil Bardewa =

Nepalese singer (1972–2016)

- सुनिल बर्देवा
- Born: 1972; Kathmandu, Nepal
- Died: 13 September 2016 (aged 43–44); Teaching Hospital, Kathmandu, Nepal
- Occupations: Singer, musician, songwriter
- Spouse: Shova Bardewa (Pariyar)
- Children: 3

Sunil Bardewa (Nepali: सुनिल बर्देवा) was a Nepalese pop singer, songwriter, arranger and guitarist. Bardewa had arranged over a thousand Nepali songs. Bardewa died at the age of 44 on 13 September 2016. Bardewa was admitted in Tribhuvan University Teaching Hospital (TUTH) after diagnosed with a liver ailment and was being treated for jaundice at the hospital.

Two of Bardewa's most popular songs are "Goreto Ani Ustai Cha Galli", and his pop ballad "Bihani Ma". Bardewa wrote the lyrics of the song with Naresh Dev Pant.
