= Geno Morosi =

Geno Morosi (July 7, 1920 – September 20, 2016) was, prior to his death, among the last living sets of brothers to serve in the United States Navy and survive the attack on Pearl Harbor aboard the same ship.

Geno and Albert Morosi were aboard the USS Maryland (BB-46), moored along Battleship Row, on the morning of December 7, 1941. Geno was watching other sailors play a card game when the Japanese attack began. Geno was initially assigned to a gun that did not have antiaircraft capabilities, so he was ordered to man a different gun on a higher deck. Geno was 21 at the time; Albert (born February 13, 1922) was 19.

Geno Morosi received a Purple Heart for hearing loss sustained during the attack on Pearl Harbor. Born in Royalton, Illinois, to immigrants from the Province of Perugia, Umbria, Italy, Geno and Albert also had an older brother, August, who served in the European theater as a member of the United States Army. August died in 2008 in Springfield, Illinois.

Geno Morosi served a total of six years, two months, and six days in the U.S. Navy. In addition to his Pearl Harbor service, he piloted landing craft for the USS Alpine (APA-92) at Guam, Leyte Gulf, Lingayen Gulf, and Okinawa. He was honorably discharged on November 15, 1946, as a Boatswain's mate (United States Navy), first class. In addition to the Purple Heart, he received the American Campaign Medal, American Defense Service Medal, and One Star, Asiatic-Pacific Campaign Medal and Six Stars, Philippine Liberation Medal and Two Stars, World War II Victory Medal, and Navy Good Conduct Medal.

Geno Morosi settled in Detroit, Michigan, after the war. He attended Lawrence Technological University on the G.I. Bill and had a long career at Carboloy, a division of General Electric. He began his career at Carboloy in a low-level position as a metal mixer but later retired as a unit manager in 1984.
