= Jim Semple =

Northern Irish businessman and football chairman

Jim Semple (c.1935 – 20 September 2016) was a Northern Ireland businessman and a former chairman of Crusaders F.C. He also previously played for the club. He is also a former President of the Irish Football League.

Semple died at the age of 81 on 20 September 2016.
