= Henri Niemegeerts =

Belgian field hockey player

Personal information
- Nationality: Belgian
- Born: 15 September 1922 Etterbeek, Belgium
- Died: 19 September 2016 (aged 94) Waterloo, Belgium

Sport
- Sport: Field hockey

Henri Niemegeerts (15 February 1922 – 19 September 2016) was a Belgian field hockey player. He competed in the men's tournament at the 1948 Summer Olympics.
