= Roy Rowan =

American foreign correspondent and author

Roy Rowan (1 February 1920-13 September 2016 (aged 96)) was an American foreign correspondent, editor, and author. He reported on the 1949 revolution that led to the founding of the People's Republic of China, as well as the Korean and Vietnam Wars. Rowan worked for Time-Life and its successor media company, Time-Warner, for more than 30 years. From late 1959 to 1970 he was Life magazine's assistant managing editor in charge of news. In 1972, Rowan returned to Time-Life and served as Time magazine's bureau chief for Asia and Australia until 1978. Roy Rowan spent the latter part of his career from 1978 to 2015 as a feature story writer for Time magazine and on the Board of Editors of Fortune magazine while writing 10 published books on a wide variety of topics.

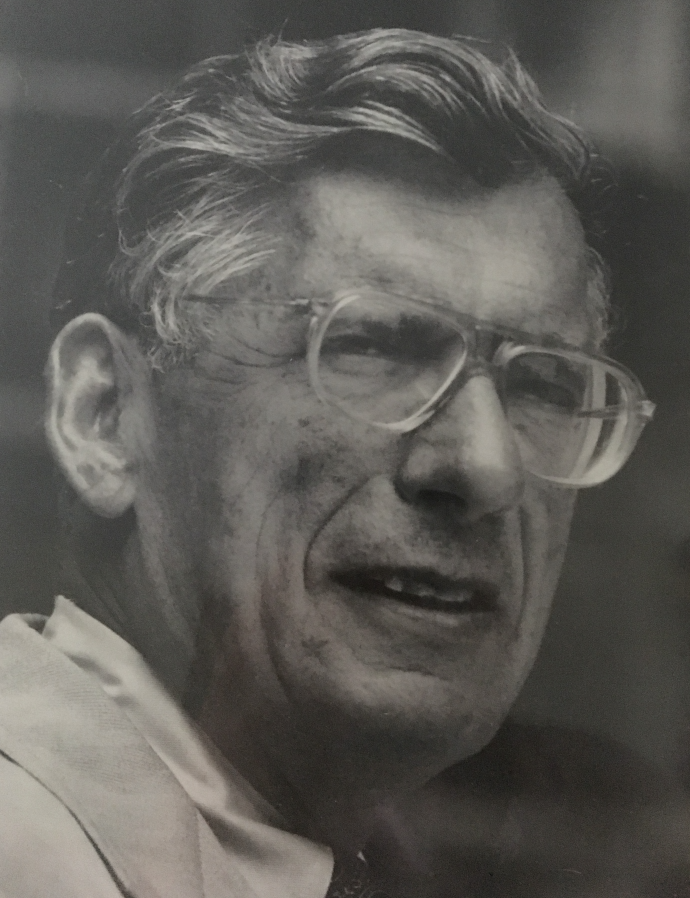
Rowan Rowan portrait

== Early life and war service ==
Born in New York City on 1 February 1920, Roy Rowan graduated in 1941 from Dartmouth College and a year later earned his MBA from Dartmouth's Amos Tuck School. Drafted as a private into the U.S. Army in May 1942, Rowan served in Tunisia, New Guinea and the Philippines, winning a Bronze Star and finishing the war as a major.

== China and South East Asia ==
In 1946, he took a job running a fleet of trucks in central China for the United Nations Relief and Rehabilitation Administration (UNRRA). With the civil war between the Communists and Nationalists erupting around him, he delivered food, clothing, and farm equipment to villages recovering from the Japanese Occupation, and contributed freelance articles and photographs to U.S. publications.

Hired by Henry Luce as a war correspondent in 1947 covering China for Life magazine and paired with photographer Jack Birns, Rowan, already something of a China Hand, covered all the major battles of the Chinese Communist Revolution by hitching rides with General Claire Chennault’s former Flying Tigers, hired to airlift military supplies for Chiang Kai-shek’s Nationalist troops. Rowan and Birns were the only foreign journalists in Manchuria when the Communists conquered the province in 1948.

Struck down by a bout of typhoid and jaundice, Rowan recovered to see Chairman Mao's troops enter Shanghai in May 1949 before being sent to cover the Malayan insurgency and the Korean War.

Roy Rowan returned to Asia in the 1970's after spending almost two decades in the US with Life magazine followed by a two year period launching two new regional magazines, called On the Sound and On the Shore. After selling the publications to Universal Publishing in 1972, Mr. Rowan was immediately recruited back to Time Inc to serve as Time magazine bureau chief of Asia and Australia, while based in Hong Kong. Much of his time was spent covering the Vietnam War and the Nixon-era easing of US diplomatic relations with China. Rowan also made several trips to China again later with President Ford. Rowan also covered the expanding economy of Australia, including several interviews and extensive visits with Prime Minister Gough Whitlam. Roy Rowan returned to the US in 1978 as a feature writer for Time magazine and later served as a senior writer and member of the Board of Editors for Fortune magazine.

== Europe and the United States ==
In 1951 Rowan began reporting on the Cold War in Europe. A story he tracked down in Yugoslavia about a mother’s fight to win back her son kidnapped as a baby by a German SS soldier during World War II was made into a movie called Divided Heart by the British film mogul, J. Arthur Rank.

In 1952, after proposing by trans-Atlantic telephone, Rowan married Helen Rounds, a Life picture researcher from Birmingham, Michigan. The couple went on to have four sons. As Life's Chicago bureau chief from 1955, Rowan covered the Little Rock school crisis and in 1957 he was the first writer to reach the "House of Horrors" in Plainfield, Wisconsin, which inspired Alfred Hitchcock's movie, Psycho.

In 1959, while still based in Chicago as Life's assistant managing editor in charge of news, Rowan spent a month with Jimmy Hoffa to profile the Teamster boss for Life and in 1963 he led the magazine's coverage of the assassination of President J.F. Kennedy. Rowan's team managed to obtain the Zapruder film, which showed President Kennedy's death, and published frames from the film on Life's front page.

Leaving Life in 1970 after 23 years working with the publication, Rowan founded his own publication, On the Sound, a magazine, covering the coast between New York City and Boston. The first in an intended series of regional waterfront publications, two years later it was followed by On the Shore, a magazine for the Chesapeake Bay area. In 1972 Universal Publishing Corporation acquired the two magazines and Time rehired Rowan to return as Hong Kong bureau chief. In 1973 during the Vietnam War, Rowan was one of the few journalists the North Vietnamese government invited to inspect the infamous "Hanoi Hilton" prison that housed American Prisoners of War. On April 30, 1975, Rowan was one of the final foreign journalists evacuated from Saigon by helicopter.

Rowan was friends with President Gerald Ford and in 1975 interviewed the then-sitting President for his book on the Mayaguez crisis. In 1977 Rowan returned to the U.S. to take a job as one of Fortune magazine's senior writers, penning some sixty five major articles, which included an exclusive 15-page exposé on the top fifty Mafia leaders in America, before resigning in 1980 to freelance write and author books. In 1990, he disguised himself as a homeless man and spent two weeks on the streets of New York for a ten-page article in People magazine.

In 1974, Rowan was diagnosed with a lethal form of melanoma, requiring radical surgery. Hospitalized for two weeks, he wrote a 6,000-word article about how he thought positive thinking could enhance his immune system. He later turned this into his book Never Too Late.

Rowan was a long-standing member of the Foreign Correspondents Club of China (now located in Hong Kong) as well as president of the Time-Life Alumni Society, the Overseas Press Club of America, and the Dutch Treat Club. Rowan also enjoyed many years as an active member of The Century Association in New York City where his memorial was held on February 3, 2017.

Rowan died at a Greenwich, Connecticut, hospital on 13 September 2016, at 96. No cause was given.

== Awards ==
- In 1995, Hartwick College awarded Rowan an honorary doctorate of Humane Letters. The citation for the honorary doctorate may be found on the OPC website.
- In 2004, he received the Henry R. Luce Award for lifetime achievement in journalism.

== Roy Rowan Scholarship (OPCF) ==
Roy Rowan was president of the Overseas Press Club from 1998 to 2000. Immediately following the concluding year of his presidency, family, friends and admirers established and funded an Overseas Press Club Foundation (OPCF) scholarship in his name. Don Underwood, a former executive at Time, Inc and Merrill Lynch, was instrumental in helping organize and secure initial contributions to the scholarship fund. The scholarship is awarded annually by an OPCF scholarship committee to an aspiring young reporter usually in the final year of undergraduate or graduate school. The scholarship award provides a stipend in support of an OPC-arranged overseas press assignment with a major magazine or newspaper. The winner is announced and recognized annually at the Overseas Press Club Foundation Scholar Awards ceremony held in New York City that features over 20 scholarship award winners and often includes a keynote address by a distinguished journalist. A description of the Roy Rowan Scholarship may be accessed at the OPC Foundation website featuring a list of all OPCF scholarships.

== The Roy Rowan Award (OPC) ==
In memory and recognition of Roy Rowan's contribution to journalistic excellence during his more than 50-year career with Time, Inc and as a prolific author of 10 books, "The Roy Rowan Award" was established through a generous contribution to the Overseas Press Club (OPC). The award is presented annually at the Overseas Press Club Awards dinner held in New York City. It is intended to recognize an outstanding journalist for his or her exceptional "investigative reporting in any medium on an international story". Annual media coverage of the award and a list of recent recipients may be found at the Overseas Press Club website.

== Archives ==
After Roy Rowan concluded his service as Trustee of Hartwick College, the college made arrangements with the author to organize and catalogue an archive of his papers associated with more than fifty years of chronicling world events. The archive includes his original reporter's notes while serving as a globe-trotting reporter for Time, Life and Fortune magazines in Asia, Europe and the US as well as draft manuscripts of many of his ten books written from 1975 to 2015. The Roy Rowan Manuscript Collection is organized chronologically and may be accessed by the public in the Paul F. Cooper, Jr. Archives at Hartwick College. The finding aid is accessible online: Paul F. Cooper, Jr. archives

== Website: RoyRowan.com ==
During the latter part of his professional journalism and writing career (as an author of ten books), Roy Rowan established a website that highlights his published books including featured photos of him with many of the world leaders and powerful business people he met and developed friendships with along the way. The website provides detailed descriptions of each of his books as well as reviews and commentary written by other famous authors, journalists and television newscasters. The website may be accessed at RoyRowan.com.

== Publications and books ==
- The Four Days of Mayaguez (W.W. Norton, 1975).
- The Intuitive Manager (Little, Brown 1986) The book was translated into 10 languages, including Chinese.
- Powerful People (Carroll & Graf 1996).
- First Dogs: American Presidents and Their Best Friends (Algonquin 1997). A one-hour documentary based on the book and narrated by Kelsey Grammer, was aired on the Discovery Channel in 1999. A subsequent edition with President Obama and his dog, Bo, on the cover was published in 2009.
- Surfcaster's Quest (The Lyons Press 1999).
- Solomon Starbucks Striper (Book Nook Press 2003).
- Chasing the Dragon (The Lyons Press 2004).
- Throwing Bullets (Taylor Trade Publishing 2006).
- Never Too Late (The Lyons Press 2011).
- Keeping Love Alive (Lulu Press 2015).
- Rowan wrote an eleventh book, Connections: American Business and the Mob for Little, Brown. Although never published due to a publishing dispute, the manuscript is stored with Rowan's papers and archives in the Paul F. Cooper archives established and maintained by Hartwick College. A remembrance by The New York Times (NYT) writer, Roger Cohen, of Roy Rowan's dispute with Little, Brown over the publication of the book and the NYT article he wrote about it may be found on the OPC website. The first of a series of several 1990 articles that Roger Cohen wrote on April 16, 1990, for The New York Times about the controversial dispute may be found on The New York Times website.
