= Ivan Mačák =

Slovak ethnomusicologist and organologist

- Born: 26 August 1935; Gbelce, Czechoslovakia
- Died: 2 September 2016 (aged 81); Bratislava, Slovakia
- Education: Comenius University
- Occupations: Ethnomusicologist, organologist
- Spouse: Mária Mačáková

Ivan Mačák (26 August 1935 – 2 September 2016) was a Slovak ethnomusicologist and organologist. He served as director of the Music Museum of the Slovak National Museum from 1991 to 1994.

Mačák died on 2 September 2016 in Bratislava, at the age of 81.
