= Jane Brick =

Swedish journalist

- Born: Inger Lindström; 12 June 1942; Stockholm, Sweden
- Died: 3 September 2016 (aged 74); Stockholm, Sweden
- Occupation: television journalist
- Spouse(s): Ove Lindström (1971–1982, 1992–?; his death)
- Children: 1

Inger "Jane Brick" Lindström (12 June 1942 – 3 September 2016) was a Swedish television journalist.

Jane Brick was born in Sankt Göran parish, Stockholm; her father was journalist Lennart Brick and her mother was Ester Cecilia. She worked for Swedish Television where she was a news anchor for the news program Rapport, as well as a foreign correspondent. She reported on the fall of the Berlin Wall, and interviewed Egon Krenz, the last Communist head of state of the German Democratic Republic.

She was married twice to cartoonist Ove Lindström (born 1940), the first time from 1971 to 1982 and the second time in 1992 to his death. She had a son called Stefan.

She died in Stockholm on 3 September 2016, of a brain tumor that had metastasized from lung cancer.
