= Robert Sivertson =

American politician

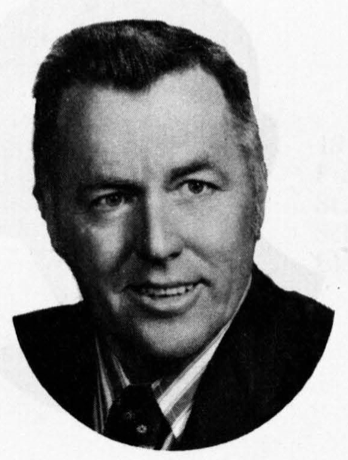

Member of the South Dakota House of Representatives from the 30th district
- In office 1971–1976

Personal details
- Born: June 17, 1925 Sioux Falls, South Dakota
- Died: September 13, 2016 (aged 91) Sioux Falls, South Dakota
- Party: Democratic
- Profession: firefighter

Robert Donald Sivertson (June 17, 1925 – September 13, 2016) was an American politician in the state of South Dakota. He was a member of the South Dakota House of Representatives from 1971 to 1976.

== Life and career ==
Sivertson served in the United States Marine Corps during World War II and received a Purple Heart for wounds in the South Pacific. He worked as a firefighter for the Sioux Falls Fire Department and retired as captain.
