= David McCay =

South African cricketer

Personal information
- Full name: David Lawrence Cornelius McCay
- Born: 18 November 1943; Hanover, Cape Province, South Africa
- Died: 20 September 2016 (aged 72); Claremont, Cape Town, Western Cape, South Africa
- Batting: Right-handed
- Bowling: Right-arm medium-fast
- Role: All-rounder

Domestic team information
- Years: Team
- 1966/67–1973/74: Western Province

Career statistics
| Competition | First-class |
|---|---|
| Matches | 17 |
| Runs scored | 345 |
| Batting average | 15.68 |
| 100s/50s | 0/1 |
| Top score | 82 |
| Balls bowled | 2,566 |
| Wickets | 49 |
| Bowling average | 21.85 |
| 5 wickets in innings | 2 |
| 10 wickets in match | 1 |
| Best bowling | 8/76 |
| Catches/stumpings | 12/– |
- Source: ESPNcricinfo, 11 May 2024

David Lawrence Cornelius McCay (18 November 1943 – 20 September 2016) was a South African cricketer. He played 17 first-class matches, mostly for Western Province, between 1966 and 1974.

McCay was a strongly-built all-rounder who began his first-class career with a six for Western Province against the touring Australian team in November 1966, going on to top-score with 82. Two months later, in the B Section of the Currie Cup, he took 6 for 78 and 8 for 76 in Western Province's victory over Natal B. Apart from those two performances his career was modest, and he played a few more matches over subsequent seasons before retiring.

McCay became a businessman. He and his wife Marlene bought and restored the Constantia Uitsig winery at Constantia, Cape Town, where he established a cricket ground.
