= Joseph Whitney =

British political and environmental geographer

Joseph Bevan Robertson Whitney (1928 – 2016) was a political and environmental geographer. He was a professor of geography at the University of Toronto, and studied Chinese culture and politics.

== Early life and education ==
Whitney was born in London, England in 1928. He graduated from the University of Cambridge with a degree in geography in 1950. He then taught geography at St. Mark's School in Hong Kong for twelve years. He subsequently studied and conducted research at the University of Chicago, earning a Ph.D. in 1969. Whitney then joined the geography department at the University of Toronto.

Whitney served as department head from 1988 to 1993, after which he retired and became a professor emeritus. He later wrote about the political, economic, and environmental geography of China.

== Selected publications ==
- Megaproject: Case Study of China's Three Gorges Project, with Shiu-hung Luk. Routledge, Sep 16, 2016. Editors.
- China: Area, Administration and Nation Building. University of Chicago, Dept. of Geography, 1970.
- Environmental impact assessment : the Canadian experience. with Virginia White. Toronto, Canada : Institute for Environmental Studies, University of Toronto, 1985.
- Sustainable cities : urbanization and the environment in international perspective, with Richard E Stren; Rodney R White. Boulder, Colo. : Westview Press, 1992.
- Urban energy, food, and water use in arid regions and their impact on hinterlands : a conceptual framework , Khartoum, Sudan : Institute of Environmental Studies, University of Khartoum, 1981.

== Personal ==
Whitney was married to Erika Erichsen and had four children. Michael, Kaaren, Daniel and Joanna.
