= Frank Raab =

American naval officer and insurance executive

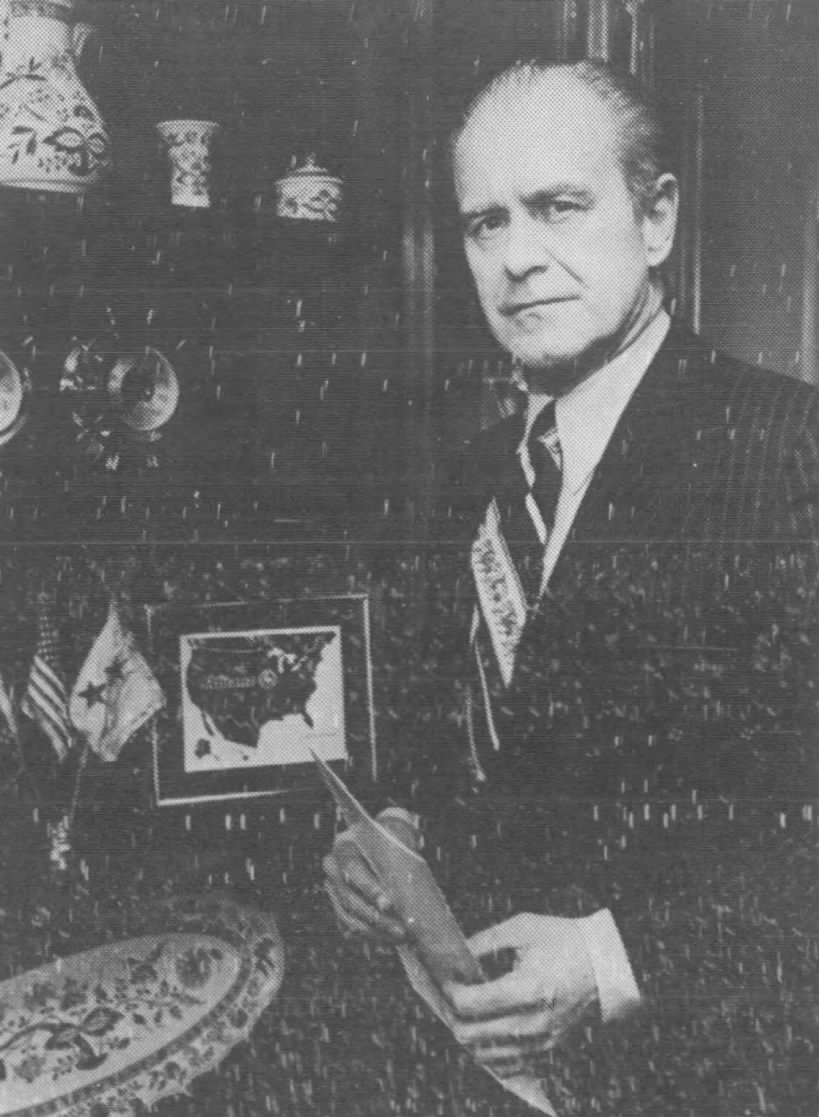
- Raab in 1979
- Born: Frank Edward Raab Jr. August 4, 1921; Riverside, California, U.S.
- Died: September 19, 2016 (aged 95); Los Angeles, California, U.S.
- Military career
- Allegiance: United States of America
- Branch: United States Navy
- Rank: Rear admiral

Frank Edward Raab Jr. (August 4, 1921 – September 19, 2016) was an American naval officer and insurance executive.

== Life and career ==
Raab was born on August 4, 1921 in Riverside, California, the son of Frank Edward Raab. During World War II, he served with the Seabees in the Pacific Theatre, which after the war ended, he attended the University of California, Berkeley, earning his bachelor of science degree in business administration in 1946. He returned to active duty during the Korean War.

Raab worked for the Insurance Company of North America for thirty years and eventually became the company's president and CEO. In 1976, he was hired by Allianz AG to establish the Allianz Insurance Company of North America, serving as president and chairman of the establishment from 1976 to 1983. He also continued to serve in the Naval Reserve, reaching the rank of rear admiral.

== Death ==
Raab died on September 19, 2016 at Cedars Sinai Hospital in Los Angeles, California, at the age of 95.
