= Ye Xiushan =

Chinese philosopher, aestheticist and Chinese Opera theorist

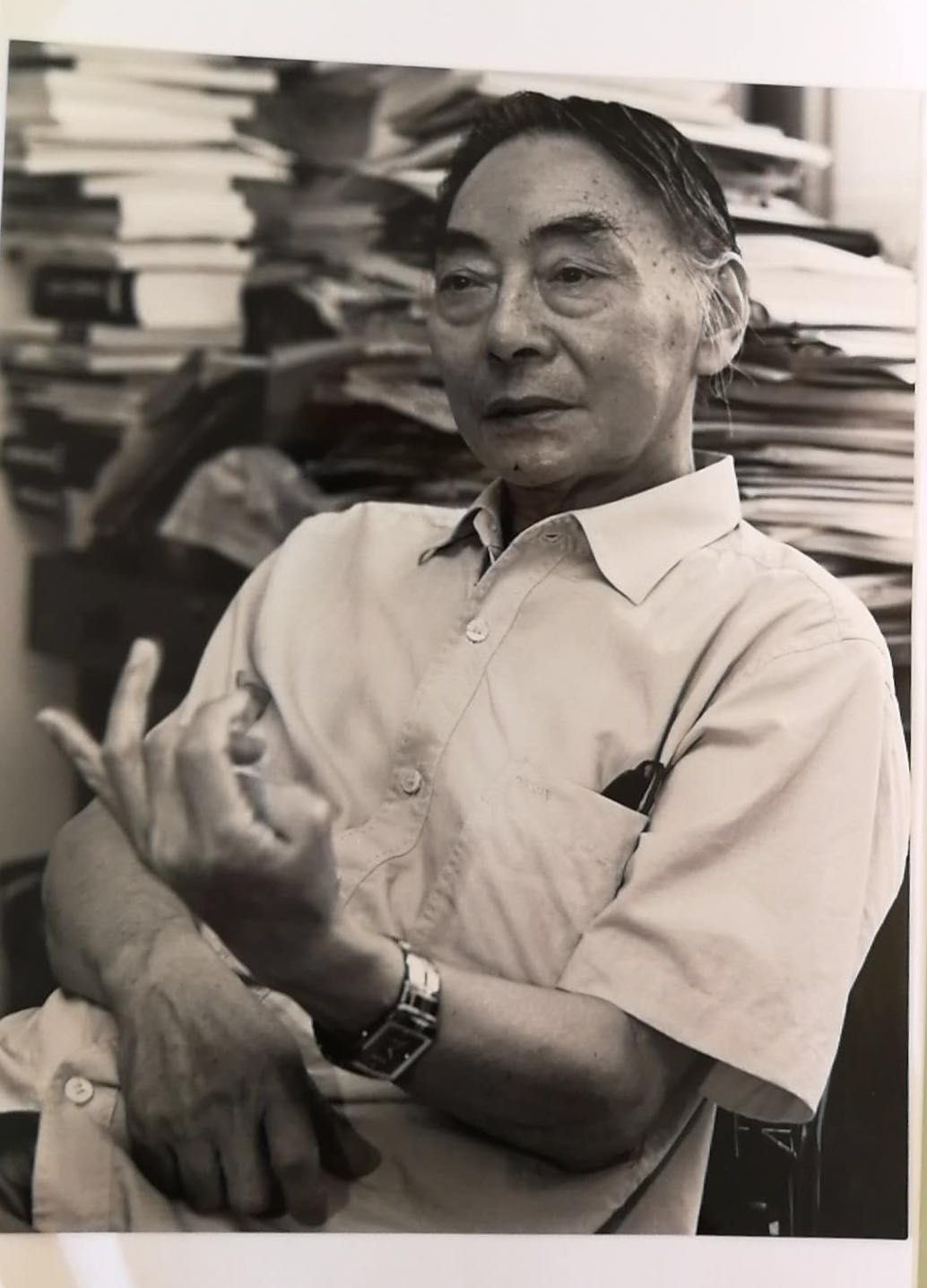
- Born: 4 July 1935; Yangzhong, Jiangsu, Republic of China
- Died: 7 September 2016 (aged 81); Beijing, China
- Education: Peking University
- Occupation: Philosopher

Ye Xiushan (simplified Chinese: 叶秀山; traditional Chinese: 葉秀山; Wade–Giles: Yeh Hsiu-shan; 4 July 1935 – 7 September 2016) was a Chinese philosopher, aestheticist and Chinese Opera theorist. Ye was one of the first Faculty Scholars at the Chinese Academy of Social Sciences (CASS), a Member of the Chinese Academy of Social Sciences, and a member of the 8th, the 9th and the 10th National Committee of the Chinese People's Political Consultative Conference as an independent scholar.

== Biography ==
Ye was born in Yangzhong County, China in 1935 and moved to Shanghai with his parents at the age of 4. He graduated from Peking University with a major in philosophy in 1956. Ye was a visiting scholar at University at Albany, SUNY and University of Oxford in the 1980s. He served as a professor at the Chinese Academy of Social Sciences, and a professor and Ph.D. student advisor in the Department of Philosophy at Tsinghua University.

== Research ==
Ye's research was based on German Classical Philosophy, and he integrated ancient Greek philosophy, modern western philosophy, and Chinese traditional philosophy. His work on freedom and rationality has had a significant influence on current Chinese philosophical development and ideological enlightenment.

== Selected works ==
Ye published over 20 books, beginning in the 1960s. His main works are the following books:

=== In Philosophy ===
- The Study on Pre-Socrates Philosophy (苏格拉底哲学研究, Beijing: People's Publishing House, 1982) ISBN 7-01-002609-2
- Socrates and His Philosophical Thoughts (苏格拉底及其哲学思想, Beijing: People's Publishing House, 1986) ISBN 7-01-002623-8
- Ideology, History and Poetry—The Study on Phenomenology and Philosophy of Existence (思 史 诗: 现象学和存在哲学研究, Beijing: People's Publishing House, 1988) ISBN 7-01-000255-X
- Endless Learning and Thinking—A Collection of Ye Xiushan's Essays on Philosophy (无尽的学与思, (Kunming: Yunnan University Press, 1995) ISBN 7-81025-555-X
- The True Happiness of Thinking (愉快的思, Shenyang: Liaoning Education Press, 1997) ISBN 7-5382-4531-6
- A Thorough Understanding of Chinese and Western Wisdom—A Collection of Ye Xiushan's Essays on Chinese Philosophical Culture (中西智慧的贯通, Nanjing: Jiangsu People’s Publishing House, 2002) ISBN 7-214-03217-1
- Philosophy as Creative Wisdom—A Collection of Ye Xiushan's Essays on Western Philosophy (1998–2002) (哲学作为创造性的智慧, Nanjing: Jiangsu People's Publishing House, 2003) ISBN 9-787-214-04918-6
- Reincarnation of Learning and Thinking (学与思的轮回, Nanjing: Jiangsu People's Publishing House, 2009) ISBN 9787214058850
- Science-Religion-Philosophy (科学·宗教·哲学, Beijing: Social Sciences Academic Press, 2009) ISBN 9787509711347
- Philosophical Essentials (哲学要义) 2010 ISBN 9-787-5062-8573-5 (revised edition: 2015 ISBN 9787550251236)
- Enlightenment and Freedom (启蒙与自由, Nanjing: Jiangsu People's Publishing House, 2013) ISBN 9787214077059
- The knowledge of “Self-knowledge” (“知己”的学问, Beijing: China Society Science Publishing House, 2014) ISBN 9787516131237

=== In Aesthetics and Chinese Opera ===
- Appreciation of the Genres of Peking Opera (京剧流派欣赏)
- An Introduction to Calligraphy Aesthetics (书法美学引论)
- The Philosophy of Aesthetics (美的哲学, Beijing: People's Publishing House, 1991) ISBN 9787010008219
- The Opera of Ancient China (古中国的歌, Beijing: Renmin University of China Publishing House, 2013) ISBN 9787300078953
- Introduction of Calligraphy (说写字, Beijing: Renmin University of China Publishing House, 2013) ISBN 9787300171869
