= Naser al-Raas =

Canadian detainee of Bahrain (1938–2012)

Naser Bader al-Raas
- Born: c. 19 November 1983; Kuwait
- Died: 19 September 2016 (aged 33); Toronto, Ontario, Canada
- Occupation: IT specialist
- Known for: 2011-12 imprisonment in Bahrain

Naser Bader al-Raas (Arabic: ناصر بدر الراس; c. 1983 – 19 September 2016) was a Canadian national who was detained by the Bahraini government for attending a pro-democracy protest of the Bahraini uprising. The charges were later dropped, and he returned to Canada on 16 February 2012.

== Arrest and trials ==
In 2011, al-Raas was working as an IT specialist in Kuwait. (al-Raas was born in Kuwait, but holds Canadian citizenship and lived from 1996 to 2000 in Ottawa.) In March, concerned by the growing unrest in Bahrain, al-Raas planned a three-week trip to visit his five sisters there and check on their safety. During his stay, he also attended an opposition rally, though he later stated in court that he had gone only to observe and had not participated.

However, on 20 March 2011, while attempting to depart Bahrain via the Bahrain International Airport, he was seized by four plainclothes police officers. He later stated that he was taken to an underground cell in Al Qala Prison and tortured for a month by being made to stand for hours at a time and beaten with a rubber hose if he attempted to sleep. Police reportedly also staged a mock execution in which they blindfolded al-Raas and fired past him with rubber bullets. According to The Toronto Star, Doctors Without Borders later recorded medical evidence confirming al-Raas's reports that he was tortured while in custody. With his health steadily deteriorating, Al-Raas was released on 28 April 2011 to the hospital, after being forced to make a video confession that he was an Iranian spy.

The police had confiscated his Canadian passport, and after leaving the hospital, al-Raas asked for its return. On 7 June 2011, he was asked to come to the police station to collect it, at which point he was arrested and allegedly beaten again. He was then charged with kidnapping and murdering a Bahraini police officer. The military National Safety Court found him not guilty of the charge on 4 October. However, al-Raas was then rearrested and named as a co-defendant in a separate case. He was tried alongside twelve other defendants for participation in the March rally, on charges of "inciting hatred towards the regime, participating in illegal gatherings and giving false information to the media". The thirteen were sentenced to five years' imprisonment apiece. Al-Raas was later critical of the Canadian government for observing his trial, but doing allegedly little to help him.

== Appeal and return to Canada ==
On 24 January 2012, twelve of the thirteen defendants were acquitted by Bahrain's Third Superior Court. Al-Raas's sentence was the only one to be upheld. His fiancée, Zainab Ahmed, attributed this to court sessions missed due to the declining health of al-Raas, who suffered from chronic thromboembolic pulmonary hypertension and had previously had two open heart surgeries.

On 25 January, al-Raas briefly went into hiding rather than turn himself over to authorities. He told an interviewer by phone that "My greatest fear is being tortured again ... I experienced it once before and it was like hell." He was arrested on 1 February 2012 at a courthouse, after another hearing for his appeals case. He was then reportedly sent to Jaw Prison.

All charges against al-Raas were formally dropped on 16 February 2012, and he returned to Canada.

== International response ==
The Canadian government stated that it was "extremely disappointed" that al-Raas's appeal was denied, asking the Bahraini government to review the case to ensure "free political expression and protection from arbitrary detention". Amnesty International began a letter-writing campaign on al-Raas's behalf, calling for the charges against him to be dismissed and stating that the organization would designate him a prisoner of conscience if he were detained. Canadian activists also founded a grassroots organization, "Free Naser", on his behalf.

== Death ==
On 20 September 2016, Naser Al Raas died while in a coma, he was in a coma before a surgery for heart and lung transplant. Naser al-Raas, 33, was undergoing medical tests in preparation for the major operation in Toronto when his heart failed, according to Amnesty International Canada
