= Adam Bielański =

Polish chemist (1912–2016)

- Born: 14 December 1912; Kraków, Austria-Hungary (now in Poland)
- Died: 4 September 2016 (aged 103); Kraków, Poland
- Relatives: Władysław Bielański (brother); Zofia Bielańska-Osuchowska (sister)

Adam Bielański (Polish pronunciation: [adam bjɛˈlaɲ.ski]; 14 December 1912 – 4 September 2016) was a Polish chemist and professor of Jagiellonian University. He was a member of the Polish Academy of Sciences. He was the author of several university-level books on inorganic chemistry, many of which are standard textbooks for students at most universities in Poland.

Bielański was born in Kraków, at the time part of Austria-Hungary. His brother Władysław (1911–1982) was a professor of biology, as was his sister, Zofia Bielańska-Osuchowska. He turned 100 years old in December 2012 and died in 2016 at the age of 103.
