= Edmund F. O'Connor =

United States Air Force general

Edmund Francis O'Connor
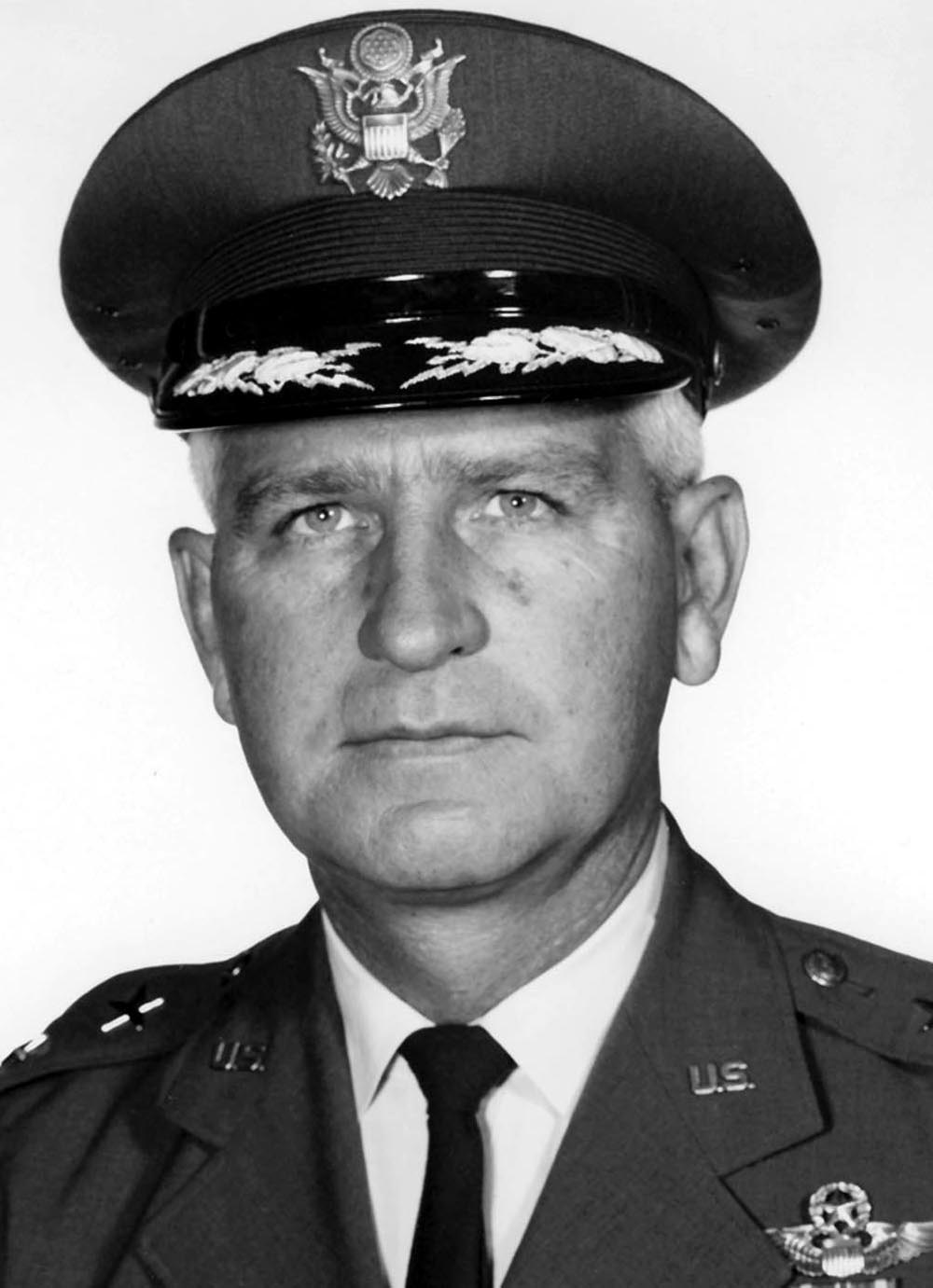
- Born: March 31, 1922; Fitchburg, Massachusetts, U.S.
- Died: September 20, 2016 (aged 94); Melbourne, Florida, U.S.
- Military career
- Allegiance: United States
- Branch: United States Air Force
- Service years: 1943–1975
- Rank: Lieutenant General
- Awards: Air Force Distinguished Service Medal with oak leaf cluster, Distinguished Flying Cross, Air Medal with seven oak leaf clusters, Army Commendation Medal with oak leaf cluster, and the Distinguished Unit Citation Emblem

Lieutenant General Edmund Francis O'Connor (March 31, 1922 – September 20, 2016) was an American Air Force lieutenant general and command pilot who was vice commander, Air Force Logistics Command, with headquarters at Wright-Patterson Air Force Base, Ohio.

== Biography ==
O'Connor was born in 1922, in Fitchburg, Massachusetts, where he graduated from St. Bernard's High School. He graduated from the U.S. Military Academy, West Point, N.Y., in 1943, with a Bachelor of Science degree in military engineering and a commission as second lieutenant. While at the academy he attended flying school at Stewart Field, N.Y., and received his pilot wings in 1943. He has a Bachelor of Science degree in aeronautical engineering from the Air Force Institute of Technology, Wright-Patterson Air Force Base, Ohio.

During World War II, O'Connor served in the European Theater of Operations as a pilot in Italy with the 459th Bombardment Group, Fifteenth Air Force. He returned to the United States in September 1944 and attended the Command and General Staff School at Fort Leavenworth, Kan., from October 1944 to January 1945. He then served at Muroc Army Air Base (now Edwards Air Force Base), Calif., until April 1946 when he entered the Air Force Institute of Technology at Wright-Patterson Air Force Base.

From August 1948 to April 1950 he served as chief of the Instrument Unit and later as assistant chief, Accessories Branch, Headquarters Air Materiel Command at Wright-Patterson Air Force Base.

In June 1950 he was assigned to the 3rd Air Rescue Group in Japan and held positions as flight commander, squadron commander, and later was assistant deputy commander of the group which was engaged in the Korean War.

He returned to the United States in 1953 and was assigned as chief, B-52 Weapon System Program at Headquarters Air Materiel Command, and remained in that position until July 1958 when he entered the Air War College at Maxwell Air Force Base, Ala. In July 1959 he was assigned to Headquarters U.S. Air Force where he served in the Office of the Deputy Chief of Staff for Materiel, as chief of the Defense Branch and later as chief, Weapon Systems Division; then was chief, Fighter Systems Staff Office, in the Office of the Deputy Chief of Staff for Systems and Logistics.

In March 1962 O'Connor was assigned to the Air Force Systems Command and went to Norton Air Force Base, Calif., as deputy director of the Ballistic Systems Division. In November 1964 he became director of program management of the George C. Marshall Space Flight Center, NASA, Huntsville, Ala., where he was responsible for the management of Saturn/Apollo launch vehicle programs and that portion of the Saturn/Skylab program assigned to the Marshall Space Flight Center.

In August 1969 O'Connor became vice commander of Aeronautical Systems Division, AFSC, at Wright-Patterson Air Force Base. He was transferred to Headquarters Air Force Systems Command, Andrews Air Force Base, Md., in August 1970, as Deputy Chief of Staff, Procurement and Production. In September 1972 he assumed duties as vice commander, AFSC.

O'Connor was appointed vice commander, Air Force Logistics Command, with headquarters at Wright-Patterson Air Force Base, Ohio, in October 1973.

His military decorations and awards include the Air Force Distinguished Service Medal with oak leaf cluster, Distinguished Flying Cross, Air Medal with seven oak leaf clusters, Army Commendation Medal with oak leaf cluster, and the Distinguished Unit Citation Emblem. He has been awarded three National Aeronautics and Space Administration Medals: for Outstanding Leadership, in 1966; the Exceptional Service Medal, in 1969, for his contribution to the Apollo 8 lunar orbital mission; and the Distinguished Service Medal, in 1969, for his contribution to the Apollo 11 lunar landing.

He was promoted to the grade of lieutenant general effective Sept. 1, 1972, with date of rank Sept. 1, 1972. He retired in 1975 and died on September 20, 2016, at the age of 94.
