= Gintautas Iešmantas =

Lithuanian politician

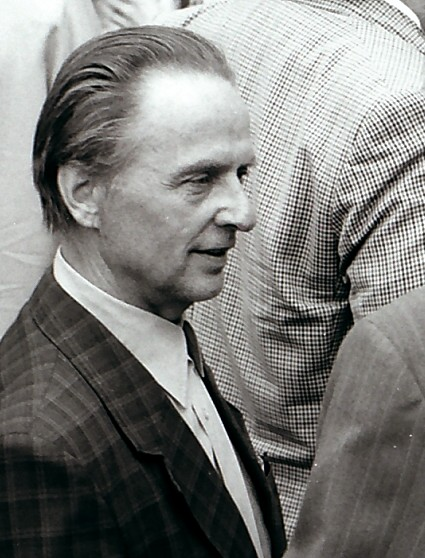
IešmantasGintautas

Gintautas Iešmantas (January 1, 1930 – September 4, 2016) was a Lithuanian politician. In 1990 he was among those who signed the Act of the Re-Establishment of the State of Lithuania.
