= Tara Singh (artist) =

Sculptor from Punjab (1931–2016)

Tara Singh (5 May 1931 – 18 September 2016) was a noted sculptor from Punjab, India. He was the recipient of a number of awards, including the Punjab Rattan Award, the Baba Farid Award and the Sobha Singh Memorial Award.

== Life ==
He was born at Lakha village near Raikot in Ludhiana district on 5 May 1931.
