= Orie Loucks =

Canadian ecologist and academic (1931–2016)

- Born: Minden, Ontario, Canada
- Education: 1949 Graduate of Lindsay Collegiate Institute 1953 — B.Sc.F. — University of Toronto (Forestry) 1955 — M.Sc.F. — University of Toronto (Forestry) 1960 — Ph.D. — University of Wisconsin (Botany; Soils/Meteorology minor)
- Scientific career
- Fields: Ecology Botany Zoology

Orie L. Loucks (October 2, 1931 – September 10, 2016) was a professor at Miami University Department of Zoology. He was a noted ecologist and environmentalist who worked to get DDT banned in Wisconsin in 1969.

== Honors ==
- George Mercer Award from Ecological Society of America (1964)
- Elected Fellow, American Association for the Advancement of Science (1987)
- Distinguished Service Award from American Institute of Biological Sciences (1994)
- The Nature Conservancy Oak Leaf Award (1994)
- Elected Fellow, Ohio Academy of Science (2000)
- National Conservation Achievement Award in Science from National Wildlife Federation (2000)
- R. W. Lyons Scholarship, 1951
- Spruce Falls Pulp and Paper Company Fellowship, 1953–54
- University of Toronto Honor Award, 1954 Sigma Xi (University of Wisconsin), 1960
- Page One Citation, Madison Newswriters Guild, 1971
- Phi Kappa Phi Honor Society, 1971
- Distinguished Indiana Scientist, Indianapolis Star, 1984
- Sigma Xi Distinguished Lecturer 1996-99
- Fellow, Institute of Environmental Sciences, Miami University, March 1998

== Publications ==
Books:

(1) 1974. U.S. Participation in the International Biological Program, Report No. 6 of the U.S. National Committee for the International Biological Program. Senior Editor for the executive committee of the U.S./IBP, National Academy of Sciences, Washington, D.C. 166 pp.

(2) 1979. Aquatic Plant Harvesting and Lake Management. Proceedings of a Conference on the Efficacy and Impact of Intensive Plant Harvesting in Lake Management. Institute of Environmental Studies, University of Wisconsin, Madison. 435 pp. (Edited with J. Breck and R. Prentki).

(3) 1979. Impacts of air pollutants on wilderness areas of northern Minnesota. U.S. Environmental Protection Agency, Environmental Research Laboratory-Duluth. EPA-600/3-80-44. (Edited with G.E. Glass.)

(4) 1993. John T. Curtis, 50 Years of Wisconsin Plant Ecology. Wisconsin Academy of Arts and Science. 339 pp. (Edited with J. S. Fralish and R. P. McIntosh).

(5) 1998. Loucks, Orie L. (Ed.), Jan Willem Bol, 0. Homer Erekson, Norman Grant, Ray Gorman, Pam Johnson, and Tim Krehbiel, Sustainability Perspectives for Resources and Business. CRC/Lewis/St. Lucie Press, Boca Raton, FL.

(6) 2006. Scaling and Uncertainty Analysis in Ecology. Springer, Dordrecht, The Netherlands. 351 pp. (Edited witl Jianguo Wu, K. Bruce Jones, and Harbin Li)
