= Thelma Finlayson =

Canadian entomologist (1914–2016)

Thelma Finlayson CM
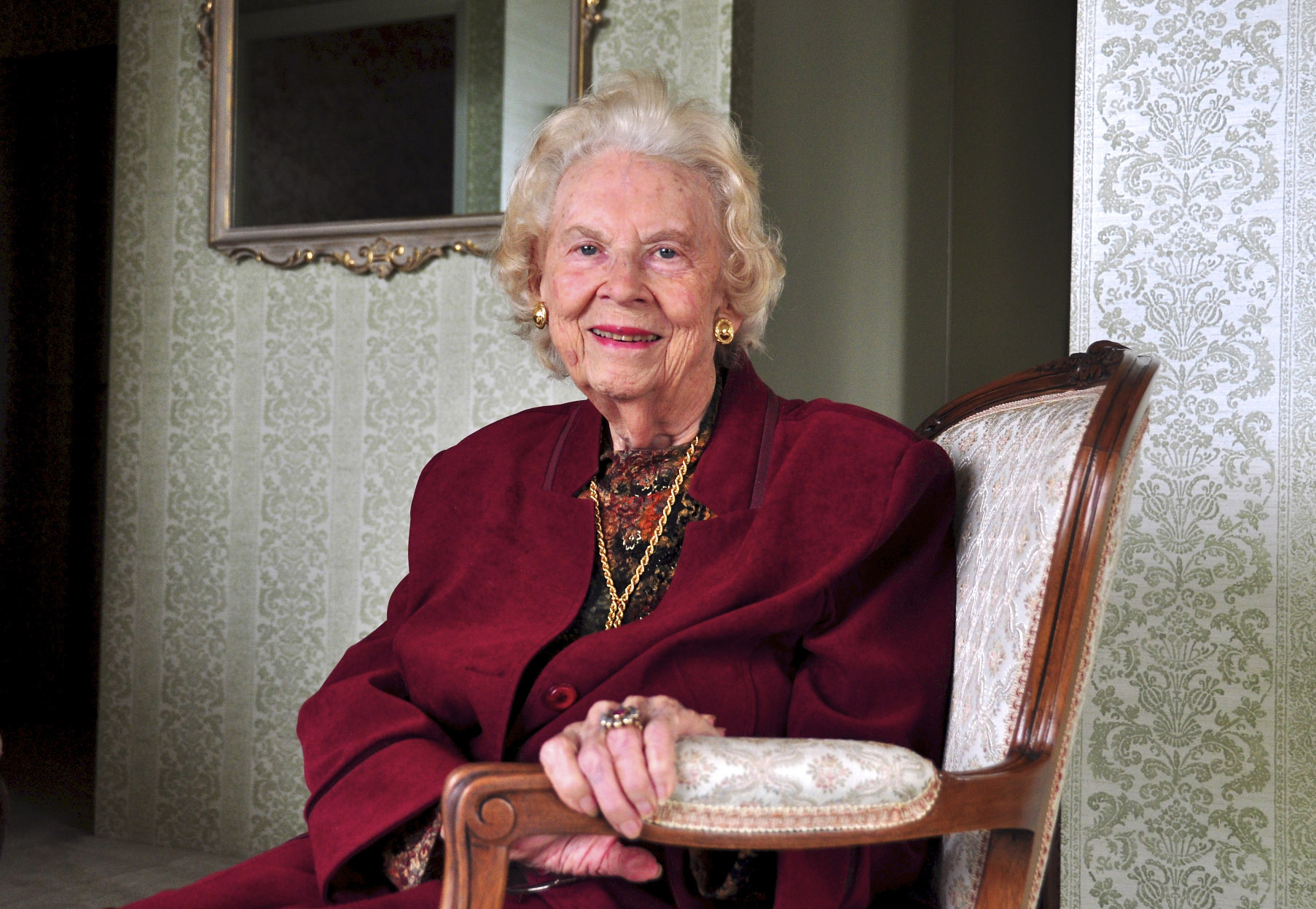
- Finlayson in 2012
- Born: June 29, 1914
- Died: September 15, 2016 (aged 102)
- Spouse: Roy Finlayson

Academic background
- Education: BS.c., 1932, University of Toronto

Academic work
- Institutions: Simon Fraser University

Thelma Finlayson CM (née Green; June 29, 1914 – September 15, 2016) was a Canadian entomologist. She was one of the first female scientists to work at a federal government's research branch and was Simon Fraser University's first professor emerita upon her retirement in 1979.

== Early life and education ==
Finlayson was born on June 29, 1914. Finlayson earned her Bachelor of Arts in Biology from the University of Toronto in 1932. She later received a certification in Taxonomy and Biological Control by ARPE in 1971 and an LLD from Simon Fraser University in 1996.

== Career ==
After graduating, Finlayson attempted to earn a position at Dominion Parasite Laboratory, which she was refused based on her gender. She eventually changed their minds and became one of the first female scientists to enter the federal research branch. While she was originally an unpaid volunteer, in the end Finlayson earned $50 a month as long as she worked weekends and holidays. However, her position was short-lived as she married fellow entomologist Roy Finlayson and was subsequently requested to leave. This was at the same time that WW2 ended and women were displaced from the workforce. As her husband was chronically ill and unable to work, she refused the request and set a human rights precedent for the Federal Civil Service regarding her right to work. She was also subsequently promoted to Research Scientist in 1964.

Finlayson stayed with Dominion Parasite Laboratory until 1967 when she moved to Vancouver, British Columbia. She became Simon Fraser University's (SFU) first female faculty member in the Department of Biological Sciences. While at SFU, she helped found their Centre for Pest Management, which led to two species of insects being named after her. The insects are an oakworm moth (named Anisota finlaysoni) and a wasp (named Mesopolobus finlaysoni). Originally an assistant professor and curator of entomology, Finlayson was promoted to full professor in 1976. She was also Director and President of the Entomological Society of BC. Upon her retirement, she became SFU's first professor emerita.

Despite retiring, Finlayson stayed involved with SFU. In 1983, she was appointed as Special Advisor at the SFU Academic Advice Centre which she held until 2012. She also established the Finlayson Chair in Biological Control. In 2005, Finlayson was the recipient of the Order of Canada. Two years later, she received the 2007 YWCA Women of Distinction. In 2010, she was the recipient of the Chancellor's Distinguished Service award. In 2012, SFU honoured Finlayson by naming their new student centre after her. The next year, she was elected a Fellow of the Entomological Society of Ontario.

Finlayson died on September 15, 2016.
