= Clive Kolbe =

South African cricketer (1944–2016)

Personal information
- Born: 16 February 1944; Cape Town, South Africa
- Died: 20 September 2016 (aged 72); Cape Town, South Africa
- Source: ESPNcricinfo, 10 November 2016

Clive Kolbe (16 February 1944 – 20 September 2016) was a South African cricketer. He played four first-class matches for Western Province between 1971 and 1975.
