= Yang Jingnian =

Chinese economist and translator

Yang Jingnian 杨敬年
- Born: 17 October 1908; Miluo, Hunan, China
- Died: 4 September 2016 (aged 107); Tianjin, China
- Education: National Chengchi University; Nankai University; University of Oxford
- Occupations: Economist; translator
- Known for: Translations

Chinese name
- Traditional Chinese: 楊敬年
- Simplified Chinese: 杨敬年
Transcriptions
Standard Mandarin
- Hanyu Pinyin: Yáng Jìngnián
- Wade–Giles: Yang Ching-nien

Yang Jingnian (Chinese: 杨敬年; 17 October 1908 – 4 September 2016) was a Chinese economist and translator from Miluo, Hunan Province.

In 1932, Yang attended National Chengchi University in the Administration department. Graduating in 1936, he joined the Nankai University economic research institute. Nine years later, in 1945, he studied politics at Corpus Christi College, Oxford, specializing in economics. In 1948, Yang earned a D.Phil. from Oxford, and that same year he became a professor at Nankai University.

Yang's most notable translations were The Wealth of Nations by Adam Smith; The Economic Development of France and Germany, 1815-1914 by John Clapham; and History of Economic Analysis by Joseph Schumpeter. In an interview in 2006, a 98-year-old Yang said his secret for longevity was a balanced attitude, constant use of the brain, learning new things frequently, and physical exercise. In 2008, he published an autobiography when he turned 100 years old.

== Life ==
=== Childhood ===
Yang was born in Miluo, Hunan, China on 17 October 1908. His father, Yang Haizong (杨海宗), had considerable discord with his wife, Li Yuxia (黎蔚霞), and angrily left home when Jingnian was still a child, never to be seen again. At the age of one month, Yang was sent by his mother to be raised by his maternal grandfather. When Yang was 10 years old, his mother remarried.

Although he lived a poor villager's life, Yang's grandfather became a scholar and passed the county level exams during the end of the Qing dynasty. He placed much emphasis on Yang's education, which began at four years of age; the young Yang moved on to reading his grandfather's books. At the age of 13, Yang was already well versed in the four books and five classics, and was proficient in literary Chinese.

=== Early studies ===
At the beginning of the Chinese Civil War in 1927, after graduating from Hunan First Normal University, Yang was admitted to the infantry department of the Changsha branch of Whampoa Military Academy, in order to join the Revolution. Three months later, due to the Mari Incident (Chinese: 馬日事變/马日事变), he decided to leave the Whampoa Academy because of his sentiments, as a person raised in a poor family, towards socialism and the Communist Party. For several years he made his living as a teacher.

In 1932, he was admitted to the KMT Central Politics University. Unlike many others who enrolled in order to get a government office, Yang went there since they required no tuition fees. During his studies he became aware of the KMT top cadre, and mainly the university's dean Chen Guofu's tendency to demand absolute obedience, and realized he could not yield to such an attitude. He therefore abandoned the idea of a public service career and planned to continue his studies abroad. This ambition required two years of experience in the desired field of study, which he intended to complete as an economics student at Nankai University.

After a short career at the Jiangsu civil affairs bureau, Yang passed the Nankai University entrance exams. His studies at Nankai University lasted for one year until the Second Sino-Japanese War broke out with the Marco Polo Bridge Incident and all students were dismissed. During that period, Yang managed to make a living by finding jobs with some help from the Nankai economic institution director, the Chinese economist Fang Xianting, and other friends. His mind was still set on studying abroad, however, which made him quit his developing career in the Ministry of Finance.

=== Attending Oxford University ===
In his first attempt to gain admission to Oxford University, in 1939, Yang failed the exams by 0.9 points, as the foreign students quota was limited to 20 students. Due to World War II, he had to wait until 1945 in order to get a second chance, and this time he went to Oxford, attending Corpus Christi College through India with a delegation of 100 Chinese students funded by public budgets. Life as a student in England was quite comfortable, with a scholarship that allowed Yang to study without having to work for his living. He related to his time in Oxford as an experience which opened his eyes to the world.

=== Back in China ===
In August 1948 Yang received his PhD in Oxford and was about to move to the United States, but he was called back to Nankai University by Franklin Ho (何廉), who had become president there. Initially the boat company denied him his ticket to China, but some help from past colleagues at the political science university who served in the Chinese embassy in the United Kingdom got him the needed tickets.

Upon reaching Hong Kong, his former teacher Chen Xujing located him and offered him a job at Lingnan University. In a talk with Ho, Ho did not mind that Yang would stay at Lingnan. At the beginning of the year, however, he prevented Yang's books, which remained in Shanghai, from being moved to Lingnan, and so without his teaching aids he was forced to move back to Nankai, as originally planned. Soon after Ho left for the United States and with, the rise of the communist regime, advised Yang to do the same. Yang refused, however, as being raised in a poor family made him quite pleased that the communists had won.

=== Under the Communist regime ===
As the communist army took control over Nankai University, all legal, social and political studies were canceled, and so Nankai's political studies department converted into an economics school and Yang was asked to form and head the new department. In an effort to establish the new department, Yang hired specialists and signed contracts with the Ministry of Finance enabling him to get lectures from government personnel and Russian experts, and on the other hand giving his students the chance to get a practice in the Ministry of Finance. This department existed for five years.

During the cultural revolution, Yang's salary shrank into 15% of the original sum, but later raised to 50%. This salary maintained his family of five members for 20 years. Being a member of right-wing counter-revolutionary group, Yang was sent to re-education through labor. Being kept away from any academic research, and not allowed to serve as a teacher, Yang worked as a translator, translating foreign economy related works and UN documents, usually under a pen name or with no personal attribution. Later he was sentenced to detention for 3 years. Yang claims these years to be the best times of his life as his most important articles were written during these years.

In 1974 Yang's wife became paralyzed due to an accident at home. He took care of her while she was bedridden for 24 years, sleeping in a camp bed near her bed. In 1976 Yang's son, Piaopeng, has died of a grave disease. His wife died in 1998 at the age of 92. On her deathbed she begged to see Piaopeng, to which Yang lowered his head and replied "I am Piaopeng".

In 1979 Yang's reputation was rehabilitated, but he was already over 70 years old, beyond retirement age. He insisted on teaching in order to make up for the lost years. In 1994, aged 86, he reluctantly quit teaching. There was some criticism of his academic infertility during these years, but Yang felt that he did his share of academic work. At the age of 80, in 1988, Yang joined the Chinese communist party. In 1998, aged 90, he started writing his work Discussions on Human Nature, handling the human nature from a combination of economical, political, social, psychological, and ethical points of view.

In his 90s he did not cease publishing essays, mainly on the subject of development economics, and served as a mentor for 20 research students. In 2001, at the age of 93, he translated Adam Smith's The Wealth of Nations, feeling that it would help spread popular economics among the people. The translation took 11 months in which he worked for eight hours a day, after which he manually added an Index. Although not being the first translation into Chinese, Yang's translation became a bestseller in China. In 2008, at 100 years old, he published an autobiography. On that occasion his students gave him a memorial board saying: "Life begins at 100 years of age".

== Economic views ==
Unlike some other scholars in China who treated development economy as just another piece of information, or as a threat, Yang claimed that development economy should be researched, criticized and utilized. He believed that the theories of Marx, Engels and Lenin on how to handle the bourgeoisie economy of their time should be used to handle western development economics. He started writing his work on these views: Outline of Western Development Economies. After five years, however, in 1957, the cultural revolution stopped his work.
