= Sam F. Iacobellis =

American engineer

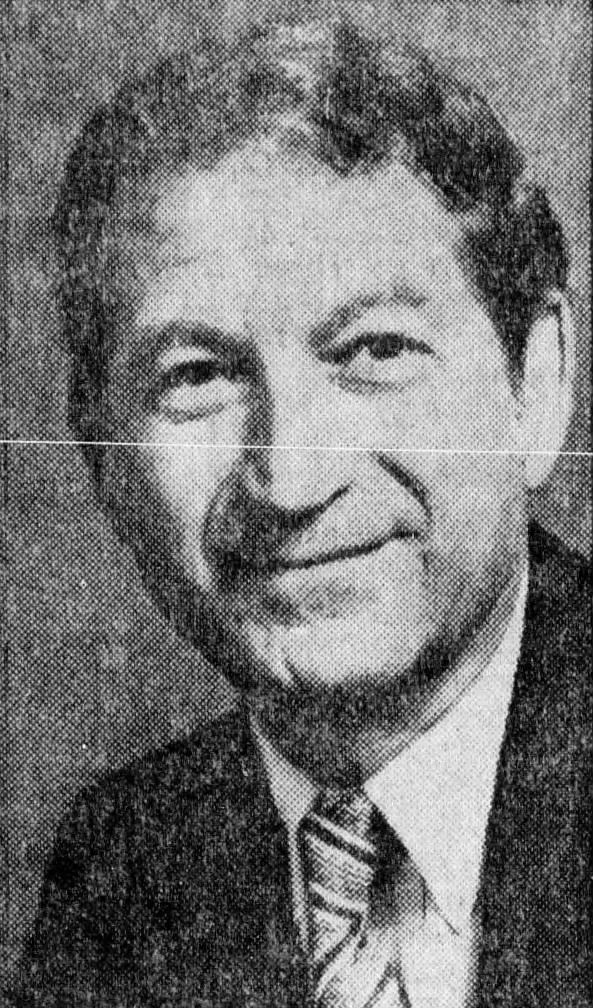
- Iacobellis in 1982
- Born: August 17, 1929; Fresno, California, U.S.
- Died: September 3, 2016 (aged 87)
- Education: Fresno State University; University of California, Los Angeles
- Occupation: Engineer
- Spouse: Helene
- Children: 2

Sam F. Iacobellis (August 17, 1929 – September 3, 2016) was an American engineer. He was known for his role in President Ronald Reagan's plan in bankrupting the Soviet Union, being credited with speeding the collapse of the Soviet Union.

== Life and career ==
Iacobellis was born in Fresno, California. He attended Fresno State University, graduating in 1952. He also attended the University of California, Los Angeles, earning his master's degree in engineering.

Iacobellis was executive vice president and chief operating officer at Rockwell International during the 1990s.

Iacobellis died on September 3, 2016, at the age of 87.
