= Frederick D. Tinsley =

American classical double bass player

- Born: March 3, 1940
- Origin: United States
- Died: September 19, 2016 (aged 76)
- Occupation: Classical double bass player

Frederick D. Tinsley (March 3, 1940 – September 19, 2016) was an American classical double bass player and member of the Los Angeles Philharmonic Orchestra's bass section for 42 years.

== Career ==
Tinsley entered the L.A. Philharmonic Orchestra under the direction of music director and conductor Zubin Mehta in 1974. During his years there he also was an assistant personnel manager and instructor in the orchestra's training program for minority students. Before joining the L.A. Philharmonic, Tinsley was a substitute bassist with the New York Philharmonic and Hartford Symphony Orchestras. He was an assistant principal bassist with the Hartford Symphony Orchestra from 1969 to 1974.

Tinsley was also a jazz bassist. He worked with Johnny "Hammond" Smith, Academy Award nominee Dexter Gordon, guitarist Kenny Burrell, trumpeter Freddie Hubbard and tenor saxophonists Houston Pearson and Jimmy Heath and flutist James Newton. He was also the lead bassist in the Los Angeles Bass Violin Choir, a group of Los Angeles-area bassists performing special arrangements by Herbert D. Smith and New York bassist Bill Lee during the 1980s.

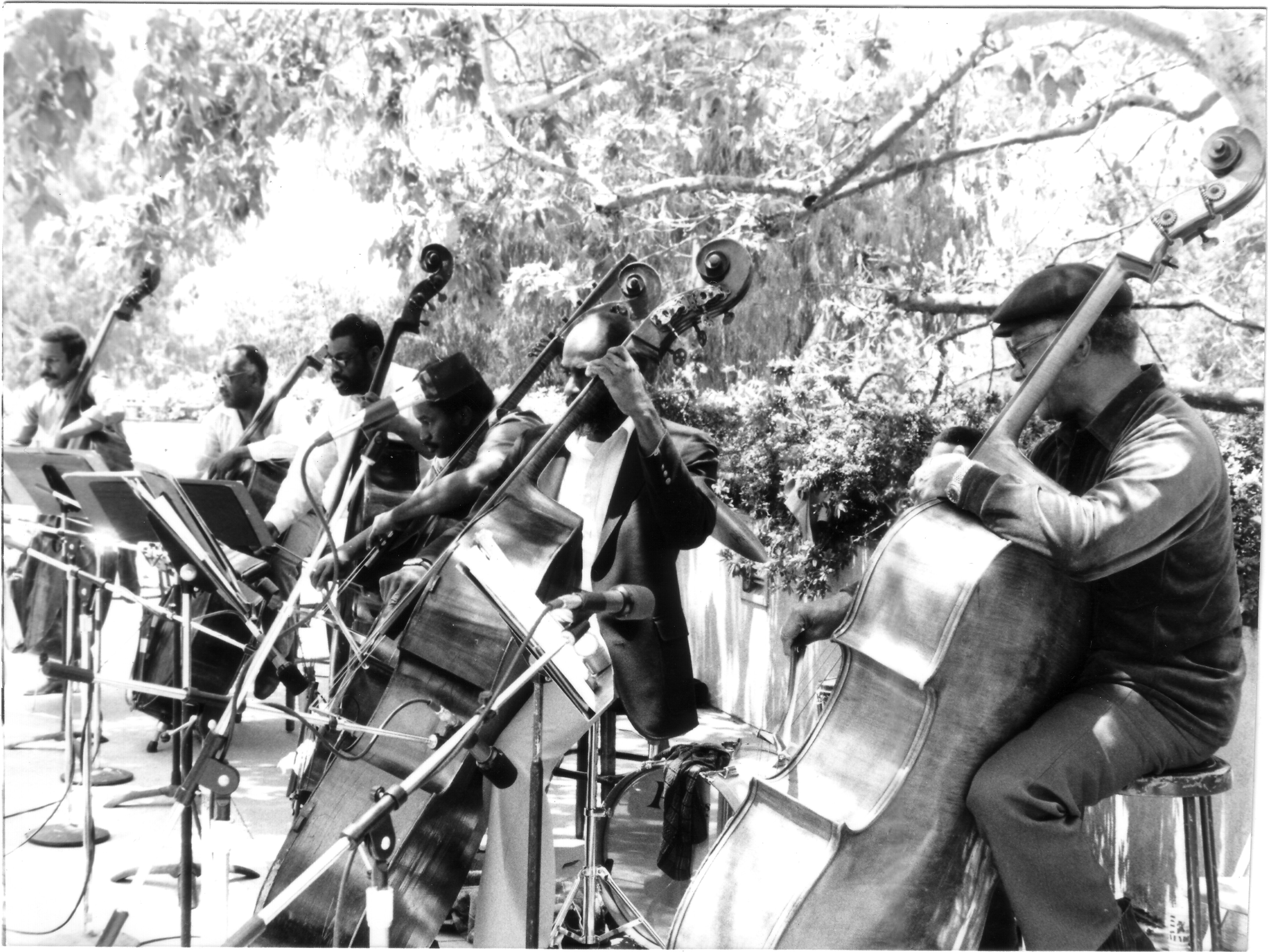

Tinsley grew up in Hartford, Connecticut. He began playing cello in the sixth grade at Arsenal School. He went on to receive a Bachelor of Fine Arts in music from the University of Connecticut, where he was principal bassist of the university's symphony. Tinsley also studied at The Hartt School of Music (now The Hartt School at the University of Hartford campus). In 1993, Tinsley received a Master of Music degree in Performance from the University of Redlands.

Tinsley served as double-bass instructor and chamber music coach at several of major institutions in the California area including Pomona College, University of Redlands, California Institute of the Arts, and the University of Connecticut.
