= Kazuyo Kato =

Japanese sport shooter

Kazuyo Kato (加藤 一義, Katō Kazuyo, 20 February 1932 – 29 September 2016) was a Japanese sport shooter who competed in the 1976 Summer Olympics.
