= Michael Javed =

Pakistani politician

Michael Javaid MPA

Member of the Provincial Assembly of Sindh
- In office 1988–1997

Michael Javaid (? - 28 September 2016) was a Christian politician and human rights activist from Sindh in Pakistan.

== Early life ==
Javaid was raised in Quetta. He migrated to Sindh in the 1970s and received his education from the University of Karachi.

== Politics ==
Javaid won four consecutive elections to the Sindh Provincial Assembly in 1988, 1990, 1993, and 1997 as a representative of the local Christian community. In 2002, Javaid joined the All Pakistan Minorities Alliance and became the inaugural President of their Sindh and Balochistan Chapter. However, he left the party on account of differences with Shahbaz Bhatti, and formed Pakistan Minority Front.

In April 2011, Javaid sought election to the National Assembly from Pakistan People's Party after a seat, reserved for minorities, fell vacant upon Bhatti's assassination but was defeated by Khatu Mal Jeewan in an intra-party rivalry. A year later, he defected to the Pakistan Tehreek-e-Insaf and became the head of their minority wing; in 2014, he defected again to the Pakistan Muslim League (N).

== Death and legacy ==
Javaid died on 28 September 2016 of a cardiac arrest. He was survived by his wife Michael Shahzadi, and their four children.
