= Maria Costa (poet) =

Maria Costa (15 December 1926 – 7 September 2016) was an Italian poet.

== Biography ==
Costa lived all her life in the neighbourhood of Case Basse (Deep Houses) in Paradiso (Paradise, a village of fishermen near Messina). In her poems, most of which are written in the Messinese dialect, she defended the cultural heritage of a town which was destroyed by a catastrophic earthquake in 1908.

Her verses are gathered in different volumes, such as Farfalle Serali (Evening butterflies) (1978), Mosaico (Mosaic) (1980), 'A prova 'ill'ovu (The egg examination) (1989) and Cavaddu 'i coppi (Cups Horse) (1993).

Numerous media and Italian and foreign television outlets interviewed Costa and many theses were developed with Costa and her work as the subjects at the Universities of Messina, Palermo, Udine, Catania and Siena.

The figure of Maria Costa was celebrated in the short film Come le onde (As the waves) by the young Messinese film director Fabio Schifilliti.

Her name was registered among the Living Human Treasures by UNESCO in 2006.

Costa died in Messina on 7 September 2016 at the age of 89.
