= Israfil Yılmaz =

Turkish-Dutch Islamist militant

- Born: Salih Yahya Gazali Yilmaz; 29 September 1987; Bandar Seri Begawan, Brunei
- Died: 5 September 2016
- Military career
- Allegiance: 2008-2011: Turkish Armed Forces; Royal Netherlands Army; After 2012: Muhajireen Brigade; Jund al-Aqsa; Islamic State
- Service years: 2008–Unconfirmed
- Conflicts: Syrian civil war; War against the Islamic State

Salih Yahya Gazali "Israfil" Yılmaz (29 September 1987), is or was a Turkish Islamist militant from the Netherlands, who fought in the Syrian Civil War from 2012 or 2013 until he disappeared in 2016 when he was allegedly killed in an unconfirmed airstrike. According to a captured jihadist, Yilmaz was executed by the Islamic State in 2018. His death however remains unconfirmed and according to intelligence agencies jihadist often fake their deaths to avoid prosecution in their home countries.

== Background ==
Yilmaz was born on 29 September 1987 to Turkish parents in Bandar Seri Begawan, Brunei, before moving to the Netherlands. Despite claiming dual nationalities, Yilmaz would generally refer to himself and his family as Turks. Following his 21st birthday in 2008, he performed 15 months of military service in the Turkish Armed Forces in Çanakkale. According to Turkish authorities, he was educated as a military instructor with the Gendarmerie. Returning home in late 2010, he enlisted in the Royal Netherlands Army to join the Korps Commandotroepen, but did not meet their requirements. He finished basic training and spent a short time in an infantry unit before leaving the Dutch Army in 2011. In the months before his move to Syria, Yilmaz worked in an old people's home, often lying to his family and friends that he was planning on settling with relatives in Adana, Turkey.

== Jihadi career ==
Arriving in war-torn Syria in late 2012 or early 2013, Yilmaz initially joined the Muhajireen Brigade (KAM) led by Omar al-Shishani, an ethnically Chechen field commander who pledged allegiance to ISIL in May 2013. Thereafter, Yilmaz went without a group for some time before he joined Jund al-Aqsa (JAA), another jihadist group that would later be designated as a terrorist organization by the United Kingdom, the United States and Saudi Arabia. Highly active on social media outlets such as Instagram, ASKfm, Twitter and Tumblr under the handle "chechclear" (named after a video in which a Russian soldier is brutally beheaded by Chechen soldiers), it was around this time that Yilmaz garnered media notice. In January 2014, the Dutch television program Nieuwsuur aired an interview with Yilmaz and showed him training a small group of foreign fighters.

Several fake Facebook and Twitter accounts under his name emerged thereafter, and Yilmaz repeatedly denied having a Facebook account or having a new Twitter account; having been banned multiple times. It wasn't until late 2014, however, that he joined the ranks of the extremist terrorist organization Daesh, better known as the "Islamic State", and achieved his ultimate notability. On his social media accounts, Yilmaz defended the 2015 attacks in Paris and other terrorist acts around the globe, claiming it was never Daesh who declared open war on the West, but the US and its allies declaring open war on Daesh. He also defended the punishment of homosexuals from an Islamic perspective, and sexual slavery in times of war. Lastly, Yilmaz attended a well-publicized AMA on Reddit and an abortive second attempt, a mere week before his death.

According to the Turkish press, Yilmaz was one of the most prolific ethnic Turkish fighters in Daesh ranks, while the Netherlands had issued an international warrant for his arrest. Yilmaz himself admitted to training British teenagers to fight in the Syrian conflict.

== Disappearance ==
Yilmaz claimed to have only been wounded once, by a YPG female militia sniper in Hasakah Governorate. The death of Yilmaz has never been confirmed and in 2018 another 'dead' jihadist from the Netherlands was convicted to six years in prison after unsuccessfully faking his death.

Israfil Yilmaz is believed by some to have been killed by a coalition air strike on Raqqa, Syria on 5 September 2016. Raqqa Is Being Slaughtered Silently and other sources claim he was killed by an air strike near the city of Tabqa, fighting the US-backed Syrian Democratic Forces on 28 January 2017. There are even claims that he had been executed by the Islamic State themselves in 2018. As of 2026, we don't know what happened to him, making his fate and whereabouts unknown although he is generally believed to be dead.
