= Deaths in September 2015 =

The following is a list of notable deaths in September 2015.

Entries for each day are listed alphabetically by surname. A typical entry lists information in the following sequence:

- Name, age, country of citizenship and reason for notability, established cause of death, reference.

== September 2015 ==
=== 1 ===
- Bouteldja Belkacem, 68, Algerian singer and composer.
- Frank Brennan, 67, Irish economist.
- Boomer Castleman, 70, American singer-songwriter and guitarist, inventor of the palm pedal, cancer.
- Dot Coleman, 79, New Zealand fencer.
- Gurgen Dalibaltayan, 89, Armenian colonel-general.
- Eric H. Davidson, 78, American biologist, heart attack.
- Antonio Deinde Fernandez, 79, Nigerian diplomat.
- Izet Haračić, 50, Serbian Olympic bobsledder.
- Richard G. Hewlett, 92, American public historian.
- Don Holder, 86, American Olympic gymnast.
- Dean Jones, 84, American actor (The Love Bug, Company, Beethoven), Parkinson's disease.
- Ben Kuroki, 98, American bomber crewman.
- Jiří Louda, 94, Czech heraldist, designer of the current Coat of arms of the Czech Republic.
- Hanna Mierzejewska, 65, Polish politician.
- Takuma Nakahira, 77, Japanese photographer.
- Antonio Nirta, 96, Italian organized crime boss ('Ndrangheta San Luca).
- Abdul Hafeez Pirzada, 80, Pakistani politician and lawyer.
- William B. Provine, 73, American science historian, brain tumor.
- Robert Ravenstahl, 90, American politician, member of the Pennsylvania House of Representatives (1975–1978).
- Aleksandar Stipčević, 84, Croatian historian of the Illyrians.
- Jacek Wierzchowiecki, 71, Polish Olympic equestrian.

=== 2 ===
- John E. Boland, 78, American politician, member of the Minnesota House of Representatives (1971–1973).
- Suheil Bushrui, 85, Lebanese academic.
- Lindsay Collins, 71, Australian marine geologist.
- Avinash Deobhakta, 78, Indian-born New Zealand jurist.
- Boudjemaâ El Ankis, 88, Algerian musician.
- Ephraim Engleman, 104, American rheumatologist.
- Henry Gleitman, 90, German-born American psychologist.
- Charles Gyamfi, 85, Ghanaian football player (Fortuna Düsseldorf) and coach (national team).
- Stan Kane, 86, Scottish actor (Storm).
- Piero Livi, 90, Italian film director.
- Aleksander Mandziara, 75, Polish football player and coach.
- Stewart McCrae, 85, Canadian politician, member of the Legislative Assembly of Alberta (1973–1982).
- Manos Nathan, 67, New Zealand artist, leukaemia.
- Giuseppe Petitto, 46, Italian film director.
- Brianna Lea Pruett, 32, American singer and songwriter, suicide.
- Tessa Ransford, 77, Scottish poet, cancer.
- William Arbuckle Reid, 82, British curriculum theorist.
- Simo Salminen, 82, Finnish comic actor.

=== 3 ===
- Wayne D. Bennett, 87, American politician, member of the Iowa House of Representatives (1973–1993) and Senate (1993–1997).
- Gabrielle Burton, 76, American novelist, pancreatic cancer.
- Sir Adrian Cadbury, 86, British businessman and rower, chairman of Cadbury.
- Judy Carne, 76, British actress and comedian (Rowan & Martin's Laugh-In), pneumonia.
- Robert Commanday, 93, American music critic.
- Stanton R. Cook, 90, American chief executive (Chicago Tribune).
- Chandra Bahadur Dangi, 75, Nepalese primordial dwarf, shortest man in recorded history, pneumonia.
- Harold Drasdo, 85, English rock climber and writer.
- Dan Eley, 100, British chemist (Eley-Rideal mechanism).
- Claude Flahault, 92, French Olympic sailor.
- Giltedge, 29, Irish-born American eventing horse.
- Leon Gorman, 80, American businessman, President (1967–2001) and chairman (2001–2013) of L.L.Bean, cancer.
- William H. Grier, 89, American psychiatrist and author (Black Rage), complications from prostate cancer and a brain lesion.
- Ken Horne, 89, English footballer (Brentford).
- Carter Lay, 44, American businessman and philanthropist, heir to Frito-Lay.
- Leland McPhie, 101, American masters athlete.
- John Noah, 87, American ice hockey player, Olympic silver medalist (1952), Alzheimer's disease.
- Jean-Luc Préel, 74, French politician, member of the French National Assembly for Vendée (1988–2012).
- Andrew Sibley, 81, Australian painter.
- Daniel Thompson, 94, Canadian-born American inventor, creator of the automatic bagel maker and the folding ping pong table.
- Yevgeny Ukhnalyov, 83, Russian artist, co-creator of the current coat of arms of Russia.
- John Waller, 91, British Anglican prelate, Bishop of Stafford (1979–1987).
- Binny Yanga, 57, Indian social worker and activist.
- Zhang Zhen, 100, Chinese general.

=== 4 ===
- Geoffrey Bolton, 83, Australian historian.
- Graham Brazier, 63, New Zealand musician and songwriter (Hello Sailor), heart attack.
- Antonio Ciciliano, 82, Italian sailor, Olympic bronze medalist (1960).
- Frédéric Comte, 39, French rally driver, car crash.
- Jean Darling, 93, American silent film actress (Our Gang), radio personality and author.
- Piers Maxwell Dudley-Bateman, 67, Australian landscape painter, boating accident.
- Eldon Johnson, 85, American politician, member of the Oregon House of Representatives (1977–1999), stroke.
- Sylvie Joly, 80, French actress and comedian (Going Places, Get Out Your Handkerchiefs), heart attack.
- Rainer Kirsch, 81, German author and poet.
- Max Kruse, 93, German novelist.
- Sara Little Turnbull, 97, American product designer.
- Claus Moser, Baron Moser, 92, German-born British statistician, stroke.
- Warren Murphy, 81, American author (The Destroyer) and screenwriter (Lethal Weapon 2, The Eiger Sanction).
- Rico Rodriguez, 80, Cuban-born British trombonist (The Specials).
- Joel Rufino dos Santos, 74, Brazilian historian and writer.
- Wilfred de Souza, 88, Indian politician, Chief Minister of Goa (1993–1994, 1998).
- Egon Sundberg, 104, Swedish footballer.
- Andrzej Szal, 73, Polish Olympic ice hockey player.
- Duane Weiman, 69, Canadian politician, member of the Legislative Assembly of Saskatchewan (1982–1986).
- Hal Willis, 82, Canadian country singer (The Lumberjack).
- Jonathan Woolf, 54, British architect.
- Cyril Zuma, 30, South African footballer, traffic collision.

=== 5 ===
- Ilja Bergh, 88, Danish pianist and composer.
- Chen Sho Fa, 86-87, Singaporean Olympic basketball player.
- Antonio Dalmonte, 96, Italian footballer (Juventus FC, Atalanta B.C.).
- Avery Dennis Sr., 86, American tribal politician and substance abuse counselor, Trustee of the Shinnecock Indian Nation.
- Gene Elston, 93, American Major League Baseball broadcaster (Houston Astros).
- Goh Eng Wah, 92, Malaysian-born Singaporean film distributor.
- Denny Greene, 66, American singer (Sha Na Na), actor, movie studio executive and law professor, esophageal cancer.
- Peter D. Hannaford, 82, American public relations consultant.
- Setsuko Hara, 95, Japanese actress, pneumonia.
- Jacques Israelievitch, 67, French-born Canadian violinist.
- Yotaro Kobayashi, 82, English-born Japanese businessman (Fuji Xerox), chronic empyema.
- Cody Ledbetter, 42, American football player (Hamilton Tiger-Cats, Edmonton Eskimos), suicide by hanging.
- Alacid Nunes, 90, Brazilian politician, Governor of Pará (1966–1971, 1979–1983).
- Norman Oakes, 89, Australian public servant.
- Richard Pacheco, 90, American politician.
- Eric Palangas, 49, American politician, member of the New Hampshire House of Representatives (2000–2006, 2012–2014), car crash.
- Aadesh Shrivastava, 51, Indian composer and singer, cancer.
- Alan Steel, 79, Italian bodybuilder and actor (Samson, The Rebel Gladiators, Hercules Against the Moon Men).
- Chester Stranczek, 85, American politician, Mayor of Crestwood, Illinois (1969–2007).
- Fagaoalii Satele Sunia, 69, American Samoan literacy advocate, First Lady (1997–2003), stroke.
- Peter Alfred Sutton, 80, Canadian Roman Catholic prelate, Archbishop of Keewatin–Le Pas (1986–2006).
- RO Tambunan, 80, Indonesian lawyer.
- Patricia Canning Todd, 93, American tennis player.
- Ivan Voshchyna, 57, Ukrainian drummer.

=== 6 ===
- John O. Almquist, 94, American scientist.
- Beverly Daggett, 69, American politician, member (1996–2004) and President (2003–2004) of the Maine Senate, polycystic kidney disease.
- Vincenzo Dall'Osso, 86, Italian boxer.
- Bastien Damiens, 20, French canoeist, European kayaking champion (2012), fall.
- Richard E. Flathman, 81, American political theorist.
- R. Hollis Gause, 90, American theologian.
- Åke Hansson, 88, Swedish footballer (Malmö FF).
- Jack Linn, 48, American football player (Detroit Lions), motorcycle accident.
- Thor-Erik Lundby, 78, Norwegian Olympic ice hockey player (1964).
- Herbert Mayr, 72, Italian politician.
- Ralph Milne, 54, Scottish footballer (Dundee United, Manchester United), liver disease.
- Martin Milner, 83, American actor (Adam-12, Route 66, Sweet Smell of Success), heart failure.
- Harald Norbelie, 70, Swedish writer and journalist, prostate cancer.
- Fred Ohr, 96, American World War II flying ace.
- Nelson Peery, 92, American political activist and author.
- John Perreault, 78, American art critic and poet, complications from gastrointestinal surgery.
- Allen Roberts, 92, New Zealand cricketer.
- Barney Schultz, 89, American baseball player (Chicago Cubs, St. Louis Cardinals).
- Muhammad Shah Rukh, 88, Pakistani Olympic field hockey player (1948) and cyclist (1956).
- Gaylord Shaw, 73, American journalist.
- Calvin J. Spann, 90, American fighter pilot (Tuskegee Airmen).
- Vladislav Timakov, 22, Russian water polo player, heart attack.
- Peter Walker, 65, British Royal Air Force officer, Lieutenant Governor of Guernsey (since 2011).
- Petraq Zoto, 77, Albanian writer.

=== 7 ===
- Susan Allen, 64, American harpist, brain cancer.
- Elena Arnedo, 74, Spanish gynecologist, writer and women's rights activist.
- Cor Edskes, 90, Dutch organ builder and restorer.
- Jorge Alberto Garramuño, 61, Argentine politician, Senator (since 2013).
- Leon Gordis, 81, American epidemiologist.
- George Guida, 93, American Olympic sprinter (1948).
- Alan Heflin, 75, American politician.
- Jane Hill, 79, Australian politician, member of the Victorian Legislative Assembly for Frankston (1982–1985) and Frankston North (1985–1992).
- Dickie Moore, 89, American child actor (Our Gang, Sergeant York, Oliver Twist).
- Sigifredo Nájera Talamantes, Mexican drug cartel leader (Los Zetas), heart attack.
- Candida Royalle, 64, American Hall of Fame pornographic actress, producer and director, ovarian cancer.
- Guillermo Rubalcaba, 88, Cuban pianist, bandleader and composer.
- José María Ruiz-Mateos, 84, Spanish businessman and politician.
- Rebecca Shaw, 83, English author, stroke.
- Sowkoor Jayaprakash Shetty, 80, Indian politician.
- Leonard Silverman, 84, American politician and judge.
- Henry Stallings II, 64, American politician.
- Josef Sterff, 80, German Olympic bobsledder.
- Turdakun Usubaliev, 95, Kyrgyz Soviet politician.
- Mitrasen Yadav, 81, Indian politician, convicted embezzler and pardoned double murderer.
- Voula Zouboulaki, 90, Egyptian-born Greek actress.

=== 8 ===
- Merv Adelson, 85, American television producer, cancer.
- Habil Aliyev, 88, Azerbaijani musician, heart and lung failure.
- Joaquín Andújar, 62, Dominican baseball player (Houston Astros, St. Louis Cardinals), complications from diabetes.
- Ron Beagle, 81, American football player.
- Erlinda Cortes, 91, Filipino actress.
- Willi Fuggerer, 73, German track cyclist, Olympic bronze medalist (1964).
- Ebby Halliday, 104, American realtor and businesswoman.
- Teri Harangozó, 72, Hungarian singer.
- Basil H. Johnston, 86, Canadian writer.
- Ferenc Kiss, 73, Hungarian wrestler, Olympic bronze medalist (1972).
- Andrew Kohut, 73, American political scientist, leukemia.
- Bettina Le Beau, 83, Belgian-born British actress (Dr. No).
- Peeter Luksep, 60, Swedish politician, MP (1991–1994).
- Tyler Sash, 27, American football player (New York Giants), accidental drug overdose.
- Carlo Schäfer, 51, German author.
- Miroslav Josić Višnjić, 69, Serbian writer.
- Smokey Wilson, 79, American blues guitarist.
- Robert Wylie, 67, New Zealand cricketer.
- Joost Zwagerman, 51, Dutch author, suicide.

=== 9 ===
- John Allen, 83, British Anglican priest, Provost of Wakefield (1982–1997).
- Annemarie Bostroem, 93, German writer.
- Lane Bray, 86, American politician, member of the Washington House of Representatives (1991–1995).
- Dan S. Budd, 88, American politician.
- Gabriel Fragnière, 81, Swiss academic.
- Sally Ann Freedman, 75, American beauty queen and model.
- Green Desert, 32, American Thoroughbred racehorse, euthanized.
- Charles Hallac, 50, American businessman (BlackRock), colorectal cancer.
- Harold Hardison, 92, American politician.
- Leinaʻala Kalama Heine, 75, American hula dancer.
- Margaret Henry, 81, Australian community activist and politician.
- Dorothy Hey, 83-84, British Olympic gymnast.
- Einar H. Ingman Jr., 85, American Army Medal of Honor recipient (Korean War).
- Bob Jewett, 80, American football player (Toronto Argonauts, Chicago Bears).
- K. Kunaratnam, 81, Sri Lankan academic.
- Fernando Di Laura Frattura, 83, Italian politician, President of Molise (1988–1990), member of the Chamber of Deputies (1992–1994).
- John Pratt-Johnson, 86, Canadian ophthalmologist.
- Jørgen Sonne, 89, Danish writer.

=== 10 ===
- Philip Amm, 51, South African cricketer.
- John Connell, 91, American actor (Young Doctor Malone, Fail Safe, Family Business).
- Norman Farberow, 97, American psychologist, pioneer of suicidology.
- Adrian Frutiger, 87, Swiss type designer.
- José María Gamazo, 86, Spanish politician.
- Ihab Hassan, 89, Egyptian-born American literary theorist.
- Franco Interlenghi, 83, Italian actor (I Vitelloni, I Vinti).
- Kärt Jänes-Kapp, 55, Estonian journalist and editor.
- Antoine Lahad, 88, Lebanese military officer, leader of South Lebanon Army (1984–2000), heart attack.
- Bengt Nyholm, 85, Swedish footballer.
- Jack Pancott, 82, British Olympic gymnast.
- Radim Palouš, 90, Czech dissident.
- James E. Proctor Jr., 79, American politician, member of the Maryland House of Delegates (since 1990).
- Alberto Schommer, 87, Spanish photographer.
- Colleen Waata Urlich, 75, New Zealand ceramicist.
- Gert Wilden, 98, German film composer.

=== 11 ===
- Hugh Brown Campbell Jr., 78, American judge and politician.
- Rezo Cheishvili, 82, Georgian writer.
- Bárbara Gil, 85, Mexican actress (Seven Women).
- Vernon Hauser, 87, Australian politician, member of the Victorian Legislative Council (1970–1982).
- Fred Lucas, 81, English cricketer.
- Roy Marble, 48, American basketball player (Iowa Hawkeyes, Atlanta Hawks, Denver Nuggets), lung cancer.
- Marcelo Moren Brito, 80, Chilean agent of Dirección de Inteligencia Nacional, head of Villa Grimaldi, convicted of crimes against humanity (Caravan of Death), multisystem failure.
- Knut Næss, 88, Norwegian football player and coach (Rosenborg BK).
- Jaswant Singh Neki, 90, Indian academic and poet.
- Lawrence S. Phillips, 88, American philanthropist.
- Alan Purwin, 53, American helicopter pilot and aerial film operator (Transformers, Star Trek, Jurassic World), plane crash.
- Kerry Simon, 60, American chef, multiple system atrophy.
- Ray Smolover, 94, American opera director and hazzan.
- Bruno Stutz, 77, Swiss clown.

=== 12 ===
- Deborah Asnis, 59, American infectious disease specialist, discovered the first cases of West Nile virus in the United States, breast cancer.
- Max Beauvoir, 79, Haitian houngan and biochemist.
- William J. Becker, 88, American theater critic and film distributor (Janus Films), complications of kidney failure.
- Melvin Bernhardt, 84, American theater director, fall.
- Bartl Brötzner, 87, Austrian Olympic wrestler.
- Claudio Candotti, 72, Italian Olympic field hockey player.
- Claudia Card, 74, American philosopher, lung cancer.
- Arrigo Delladio, 86, Italian Olympic cross-country skier (1952).
- Valentin Dzhonev, 63, Bulgarian Olympic athlete.
- John Emerton, 87, British Hebraist, Regius Professor of Hebrew at Cambridge University (1968–1995).
- Frank D. Gilroy, 89, American playwright and screenwriter.
- Malcolm Graham, 81, English footballer (Barnsley, Leyton Orient, Queens Park Rangers).
- Kenneth Leech, 76, British Anglican priest and theologian, founded Centrepoint.
- Maciek Malish, 53, Polish-born American sound editor (The X-Files, Lost, Starship Troopers), traffic collision.
- Bill H. McAfee, 84, American radio (WCGA) and TV (WTVC) broadcaster and politician, member of the Tennessee House of Representatives (1976–2000).
- Bryn Merrick, 56, Welsh bassist (The Damned), cancer.
- Al Monchak, 98, American baseball player (Philadelphia Phillies) and coach (Pittsburgh Pirates).
- Aronda Nyakairima, 56, Ugandan army officer and politician, Chief of Defence Forces (2003–2013), Minister of Internal Affairs (since 2013), heart attack.
- Neil Rosendorff, 70, South African cricketer.
- Salvo, 68, Italian artist.
- Bernard Secly, 84, French horse trainer.
- Ron Springett, 80, English footballer (Sheffield Wednesday).
- Howard J. Wiarda, 75, American academic.
- Zhang Xu, 101, Chinese telecommunications engineer.

=== 13 ===
- Sir Jim Belich, 88, New Zealand politician, Mayor of Wellington (1986–1992).
- Erma Bergmann, 91, American baseball player (AAGPBL) (1946–1951).
- Brown Panther, 7, British Thoroughbred racehorse, euthanized after race injury.
- Brian Close, 84, English cricketer (Yorkshire, Somerset, England).
- Georges de Paris, 81, French-born American tailor.
- Stanley Hoffmann, 86, Austrian-born French scholar.
- Jane Jacobs, 91, American baseball player (AAGPBL).
- Howie Johnson, 90, American golf player.
- Betty Judge, 94, Australian runner and coach.
- Betty Lago, 60, Brazilian actress, gallbladder cancer.
- Moses Malone, 60, American Hall of Fame basketball player (Philadelphia 76ers, Houston Rockets), atherosclerosis.
- Barrie Meyer, 83, English footballer (Bristol Rovers, Bristol City, Plymouth Argyle), cricket player (Gloucestershire) and umpire.
- Raymond Mould, 74, British property developer and racehorse owner.
- Ian Payne, 65, South African cricketer.
- Gord Pennell, 86, Canadian ice hockey player (Buffalo Bisons).
- Jay Scott Pike, 91, American cartoonist and illustrator.
- Gary Richrath, 65, American guitarist and songwriter (REO Speedwagon).
- Kalamandalam Satyabhama, 77, Indian dancer.
- Carl Emil Schorske, 100, American cultural historian, winner of the Pulitzer Prize for General Nonfiction (1981).
- Ted Smith, 95, British nature conservationist.
- Paul Takagi, 92, American sociologist and criminologist.
- Vivinho, 54, Brazilian footballer (Vasco).

=== 14 ===
- Davey Browne, 28, Australian boxer, head injuries sustained in a bout.
- Fred DeLuca, 67, American businessman, co-founder of Subway, leukemia.
- Emile Fritz, 95, American football player.
- Bill Golden, 81, American drag racer.
- Indika Gunawardena, 72, Sri Lankan politician, Minister of Higher Education.
- Martin Kearns, 38, British drummer (Bolt Thrower).
- Bob Ledger, 77, English footballer (Huddersfield Town, Oldham Athletic, Mansfield Town).
- Steve Meilinger, 84, American football player (Washington Redskins, Green Bay Packers, Pittsburgh Steelers).
- Joyce Messenger, 84, American baseball player (Grand Rapids Chicks).
- György Mészáros, 82, Hungarian sprint canoeist, Olympic silver medalist (1960).
- Mile Novaković, 65, Serbian major general, Commander of the Republic of Serbian Krajina Army (1992–1994).
- Hugh O'Neil, 79, Canadian politician, MPP of Ontario (1975–1995).
- Ceferino Peroné, 90, Argentine Olympic cyclist.
- Adam Purple, 84, American environmental activist, heart attack.
- Dennis Rampling, 91, English footballer (Bournemouth & Boscombe Athletic).
- Willy O. Rossel, 94, Swiss-born American chef.
- Paweł Sobek, 85, Polish international footballer.
- Keith Remfry, 67, British judoka, Olympic silver medallist (1976).
- Corneliu Vadim Tudor, 65, Romanian politician, Member of the European Parliament (2009–2014), journalist and editor (România Liberă, AGERPRES), heart attack.
- Ben Vidricksen, 88, American politician.
- Ali Wardhana, 87, Indonesian economist, Minister of Finance (1966–1983), Coordinating Minister for Economic Affairs (1983–1988).

=== 15 ===
- Johnny "Yard Dog" Jones, 74, American blues singer.
- Harry J. Lipkin, 94, Israeli nuclear physicist.
- Cor Melchers, 61, Dutch painter, legionnaires' disease.
- José María Ortiz de Mendíbil, 89, Spanish football referee.
- Meir Pa'il, 89, Israeli politician and military historian, member of the Knesset (1974–1980), complications from Alzheimer's disease.
- Tomas Pontén, 69, Swedish actor and director.
- Tommy Thompson, 86, English footballer (Aston Villa, Preston North End).
- Ian Uttley, 73, New Zealand rugby union player (Auckland, Wellington, Hawke's Bay, national team), traffic collision.
- Bernard Van de Kerckhove, 74, Belgian racing cyclist.
- Mihai Volontir, 81, Moldovan actor (In the Zone of Special Attention).
- Randy Wiles, 64, American baseball player (Chicago White Sox), cancer.
- Malcolm J. Williamson, 64, British mathematician and cryptographer, cancer.

=== 16 ===
- Christophe Agou, 46, French photographer, cancer.
- David Ashby, 65, British motorcycle speedway rider, cancer.
- Guy Béart, 85, French singer-songwriter, heart attack.
- Julio Brady, 73, U.S. Virgin Islander judge and politician, Lieutenant Governor (1983–1987).
- Bob Cleary, 79, American ice hockey player, Olympic gold medalist (1960).
- David Cook, 74, British broadcaster and writer.
- Clóvis Fernandes, 60, Brazilian football fan, cancer.
- Overton James, 90, American educator and politician, Governor of the Chickasaw Nation (1963–1987).
- Peggy Jones, 75, American guitarist (Bo Diddley).
- Abolghasem Khazali, 90, Iranian politician and Shi'i ayatollah, co-author of the Constitution of the Islamic Republic of Iran.
- Robert Kilpatrick, Baron Kilpatrick of Kincraig, 89, Scottish physician and life peer.
- Emma Wong Mar, 89, American political activist.
- Terry McCavana, 93, Northern Irish footballer.
- Ossi Mildh, 85, Finnish Olympic hurdler (1952), (1956).
- Peter Molan, 71, Welsh-born New Zealand biochemist, cancer.
- Anthony Kevin Morais, 55, Malaysian public prosecutor, homicide.
- W. H. Oliver, 90, New Zealand historian and poet.
- Kurt Oppelt, 83, Austrian figure skater, Olympic champion (1956).
- Niall O'Shaughnessy, 59, Irish Olympic middle distance runner (1976), brain cancer.
- Joe Morrone, 79, American soccer coach (Connecticut Huskies).
- Helder Torres, 40, Guatemalan Olympic swimmer.
- Ton van de Ven, 71, Dutch industrial designer.
- Allan Wright, 95, British World War II flying ace.

=== 17 ===
- Ingrīda Andriņa, 71, Latvian stage and film actress.
- Peter Barrable, 72, South African cricketer.
- Stojan Batič, 90, Slovene sculptor.
- Valeria Cappellotto, 45, Italian Olympic racing cyclist (1992, 2000).
- Tom Cichowski, 71, American football player (Denver Broncos).
- Eddie Connolly, 29, Irish hurler (Tipperary), brain cancer.
- Dettmar Cramer, 90, German football manager (Bayern Munich).
- Bobby Etheridge, 73, American baseball player (San Francisco Giants).
- Milo Hamilton, 88, American Hall of Fame sportscaster (Houston Astros).
- Sir Peter Heatly, 91, Scottish Olympic diver (1948, 1952), chairman of the Commonwealth Games Federation.
- Danilo Jovanovitch, 96, Australian poet and actor.
- Vadim Kuzmin, 78, Russian theoretical physicist.
- Joe Maiden, 74, British horticulturist, prostate cancer.
- Carlos Manga, 87, Brazilian film director.
- D. M. Marshman Jr., 92, American screenwriter (Sunset Boulevard).
- Bal Pandit, 86, Indian cricket player, writer and commentator.
- Everett Parker, 102, American civil rights activist.
- Mikhail Remizov, 66, Russian actor.
- Nelo Risi, 95, Italian poet and film director (A Season in Hell).
- Bruno Tommasi, 85, Italian Roman Catholic prelate, Archbishop of Lucca (1991–2005).
- Sir David Willcocks, 95, British choirmaster, director of music at Choir of King's College, Cambridge.
- Eraclio Zepeda, 78, Mexican author and politician.

=== 18 ===
- Nancy Bernstein, 55, American visual effects and film producer (The Lord of the Rings: The Fellowship of the Ring, X-Men, Rise of the Guardians), colorectal cancer.
- Eduardo Bonvallet, 60, Chilean footballer (Universidad de Chile, national team) and commentator, suicide by hanging.
- James R. Houck, 74, American astrophysicist.
- John A. Jane, 84, American neurosurgeon.
- Holger Karlsson, 80, Swedish Olympic ski jumper.
- Moe Mantha Sr., 81, Canadian ice hockey player and politician, MP (1984–1988).
- Mario Menéndez, 85, Argentine military officer, Military Governor of the Falkland Islands (1982).
- William E. Paul, 79, American immunologist and AIDS researcher, acute myeloid leukemia.
- Jim Ross, 87, Australian football player (St Kilda).
- Czesław Ryll-Nardzewski, 88, Polish mathematician.
- Freddy Ternero, 53, Peruvian football player and manager, kidney cancer.
- Anthony C. Winkler, 73, Jamaican novelist and screenwriter (The Annihilation of Fish).
- Marcin Wrona, 42, Polish film and television director (Demon, Medics), suicide by hanging.

=== 19 ===
- Rashid bin Mohammed Al Maktoum, 33, Emirati prince, businessman and endurance runner, heart attack.
- Hannah Idowu Dideolu Awolowo, 99, Nigerian businesswoman and politician.
- Enrique Ballesté, 68, Mexican theatre director.
- James Rodger Brandon, 88, American academic.
- Jake Brewer, 34, American political aide, traffic collision.
- Mishael Cheshin, 79, Israeli judge, member of the Supreme Court (1992–2006), cancer.
- Jackie Collins, 77, British-American novelist, breast cancer.
- Georg Eder, 87, Austrian Roman Catholic prelate, Archbishop of Salzburg (1989–2002).
- Todd Ewen, 49, Canadian ice hockey player (St. Louis Blues, Montreal Canadiens, Mighty Ducks of Anaheim), suicide by gunshot.
- Miki Gorman, 80, Japanese-born American marathon runner, cancer.
- Sadhan Gupta, 97, Indian lawyer and politician.
- Joseph C. Johnston, 76, American politician.
- Ismael Kiram II, 76, Philippine sultan, Regent of Sulu (since 2001), kidney failure.
- Bill Larson, 77, American football player (Boston Patriots).
- Alan Magill, 61, American medical researcher.
- Winton W. Marshall, 96, American air force lieutenant general.
- Eugenio Mayer, 75, Italian Olympic skier.
- Hiroshi Motoyama, 89, Japanese parapsychologist.
- Brian Sewell, 84, British art critic.
- Masajuro Shiokawa, 93, Japanese politician, Minister of Finance (2001–2003), pneumonia.
- Herschel Silverman, 89, American Beat poet.
- Marie Tulip, 80, Australian feminist writer and academic.
- Walter Young, 35, American baseball player (Baltimore Orioles), heart attack.

=== 20 ===
- Carmen Balcells, 85, Spanish literary agent.
- Murdoch Burnett, 61, Canadian poet.
- Dorothy Butler, 90, New Zealand children's author, bookseller and reading advocate.
- Mario Caiano, 82, Italian film director (My Name Is Shanghai Joe, The Terror of Rome Against the Son of Hercules).
- Jagmohan Dalmiya, 75, Indian cricket official, President of International Cricket Council (1997–2000) and Board of Control for Cricket in India (2001–2004), cardiac arrest.
- Giovanni De Vivo, 75, Italian Roman Catholic prelate, Bishop of Pescia (since 1993).
- Siegfried Gottwald, 72, German mathematician.
- Joseph Iannuzzi, 84, American mobster and FBI informant, bone cancer.
- Jack Larson, 87, American playwright and actor (Adventures of Superman).
- Geoffrey Lilley, 95, British aeronautical scientist.
- John Parker, 6th Earl of Morley, 92, British aristocrat, Lord Lieutenant of Devon (1982–1998).
- Richard Riendeau, 82, American football player and coach.
- Franz Surges, 57, German composer and musician.
- Radhika Thilak, 45, Indian singer, cancer.
- C. K. Williams, 78, American poet, winner of the Pulitzer Prize for Poetry (2000), multiple myeloma.

=== 21 ===
- Ben Cauley, 67, American trumpet player and singer (The Bar-Kays).
- Juliet Clutton-Brock, 82, English zooarchaeologist.
- Honey Lee Cottrell, 68, American photographer and filmmaker.
- N. Patrick Crooks, 77, American judge, Wisconsin Supreme Court justice (since 1996).
- Victor Démé, 53, Burkinabe singer-songwriter, malaria.
- Ivan Dvorny, 63, Russian basketball player, Olympic champion (1972), lung cancer.
- Abdulcadir Gabeire Farah, 59–60, Somali-born Polish social activist and historian, candidate for President of Somalia in 2016, bombing.
- Raphael Michael Fliss, 84, American Roman Catholic prelate, Bishop of Superior (1985–2007).
- Esther Golar, 71, American politician, member of the Illinois House of Representatives (since 2006), cancer.
- Yoram Gross, 88, Polish-born Australian animation producer and director (The Adventures of Blinky Bill).
- Vasily Ilyin, 66, Russian Soviet handball player, Olympic champion (1976).
- Kenneth L. Johnson, 90, British engineer.
- Charles Kellogg, 75, American Olympic skier.
- Armen Movsisyan, 53, Armenian politician, Minister of Energy and Natural Resources (2001–2014), cancer.
- Costas Papacostas, 75, Cypriot politician, Minister of Defence (2008–2011).
- Leon Root, 86, American orthopedic surgeon and author, complications of a low blood count.
- Robert E. Simon, 101, American real estate entrepreneur.
- Ray Warleigh, 76, Australian-born British saxophonist and flautist, cancer.
- Richard Williamson, 74, American football player (Alabama Crimson Tide) and coach (Kansas City Chiefs, Tampa Bay Buccaneers, Carolina Panthers).

=== 22 ===
- Yogi Berra, 90, American Hall of Fame baseball player and manager (New York Yankees, New York Mets), member of 13 World Series championship teams.
- Granger Cobb, 55, American retirement community executive, cancer.
- Richard Dickson Cudahy, 89, American federal judge.
- Edmund Fantino, 76, American neuroscientist, prostate cancer.
- Elizabeth Fink, 70, American defense attorney.
- Nana Gichuru, 28, Kenyan actress, traffic collision.
- George H. Goodrich, 90, American judge and attorney.
- Asako Kishi, 91, Japanese cookery journalist.
- Joe LeSage, 86, American politician.
- Gerard Mach, 89, Polish Olympic sprinter.
- John J. McNeill, 90, American Jesuit priest and gay rights activist.
- Ali Salem, 79, Egyptian writer.
- James David Santini, 78, American politician, member of the U.S. House of Representatives for Nevada at-large (1975–1983), esophageal cancer.
- Al Seckel, 57, American optical illusion collector and sceptic. (death announced on this date)
- Richard G. Scott, 86, American cleric, Mormon apostle.
- Phyllis Tickle, 81, American religious studies author and lector, lung cancer.
- Derek Ware, 77, British stuntman and actor (Doctor Who, The Italian Job), cancer.
- Mokhtar Yahyaoui, 63, Tunisian judge, cardiac arrest.

=== 23 ===
- Carlos Álvarez-Nóvoa, 75, Spanish actor (Solas).
- Tor Arneberg, 87, Norwegian sailor, Olympic silver medalist (1952).
- Adnan Buyung Nasution, 81, Indonesian lawyer and human rights activist, kidney failure.
- Jean-Marie Drot, 86, French writer and documentary filmmaker.
- Joan Duncan, 73, Canadian politician.
- Mike Gibson, 75, Australian sports journalist and broadcaster, suicide.
- Dragan Holcer, 70, Croatian footballer (Hajduk Split).
- Aleksandr Kolpovski, 62, Russian Soviet footballer (CSKA).
- Katsuhiro Nakamura, 66, Japanese baseball player, intracranial hemorrhage.
- Claudia Pasini, 76, Italian Olympian
- Dayananda Saraswati, 85, Indian Hindu monk and teacher (Arsha Vidya Gurukulam).
- Denis Sonet, 89, French Roman Catholic priest and marriage counselor.

=== 24 ===
- Mohan Bhandari, Indian actor, brain tumour.
- Paul Carney, 72, Irish judge, High Court judge (1991–2015).
- Uğur Dağdelen, 41, Turkish footballer, suicide by gunshot.
- Bas van Duivenbode, 75, Dutch Olympic boxer.
- Chuck Forsberg, 71, American computer programmer.
- Kikujirō Fukushima, 94, Japanese photographer, stroke.
- Assad Murtaza Gilani, 47, Pakistani politician, Member of National Assembly (2002–2008), Mina crush disaster.
- William W. Gullett, 92, American politician.
- Michael Howard, 67, British pagan author and editor (The Cauldron).
- Ellis Kaut, 94, German author (Pumuckl).
- Naomi Kawashima, 54, Japanese actress, bile duct cancer.
- Celina Kombani, 56, Tanzanian politician.
- Alan Moore, 101, Australian war artist.
- Patrick O'Donnell, 75, Canadian general, Vice Chief of the Defence Staff (1993–1995).
- Hugo St-Cyr, 36, Canadian actor (Watatatow, October 1970), bone cancer.
- samfree, 31, Japanese musician and producer.
- Peter P. Sorokin, 84, American physicist.
- Harold Stapleton, 100, Australian cricketer (New South Wales).
- Ed Sukla, 72, American baseball player (California Angels), osteosarcoma.
- Bilkisu Yusuf, 62, Nigerian journalist and editor, Mina crush disaster.
- Wang Zhongshu, 89, Chinese archaeologist.

=== 25 ===
- Carlos Anibal Altamirano Argüello, 73, Ecuadorian Roman Catholic prelate, Bishop of Azogues (since 2004).
- Claudio Baggini, 79, Italian Roman Catholic prelate, Bishop of Vigevano (2000–2011).
- Bill Bridges, 76, American basketball player (Atlanta Hawks, Golden State Warriors).
- Dino Brugioni, 93, American imagery intelligence analyst.
- Martin Colfer, Irish footballer, (Shelbourne, national team).
- Bill Crawford, 79, American politician, member of Indiana House of Representatives (1972–2012).
- Pat Dunne, 72, Irish football player and manager.
- John Galvin, 86, American army general, Supreme Allied Commander Europe (1987–1992).
- Tommie Green, 59, American basketball player (New Orleans Jazz) and college coach (Southern University).
- Terje Gulbrandsen, 70, Norwegian footballer (Skeid, Vålerenga).
- Hugo Gutiérrez Vega, 81, Mexican poet, diplomat and academic, Ambassador to Greece (1987–1994).
- Christopher Jackson, 67, Canadian musician, lung cancer.
- Henry Jacobs, 91, American sound artist and radio presenter.
- Alexandr Jurečka, 24, Czech judoka, scuba diving accident.
- Tom Kelley, 71, American Major League Baseball player (Cleveland Indians, Atlanta Braves).
- Moti Kirschenbaum, 76, Israeli journalist and media personality.
- Morten Krogh, 67, Norwegian Olympic fencer (1972).
- Jim Meadowcroft, 68, English snooker player and commentator.
- Richard M. Moose, 83, American politician.
- Manuel Oltra, 93, Spanish composer, pneumonia.
- Carol Rama, 97, Italian painter.
- David Watt, 98, Australian cricketer.
- Joe Wilson, 78, English footballer (Workington Reds, Wolverhampton Wanderers).
- Zabeel, 28, New Zealand racehorse, leading sire in Australia (1998–1999) and New Zealand (1998–2001), namesake of the Zabeel Classic.

=== 26 ===
- Jamal al Barzinji, 75, Iraqi-born American Muslim activist.
- Chng Seng Mok, 65, Singaporean Olympic sports shooter.
- Eugene D. Commins, 83, American physicist.
- Tino García, 80, Nicaraguan-Puerto Rican actor, bone cancer.
- Roy Kelly, 90, Canadian ice hockey player.
- Kazuaki Kimura, 69, Japanese academic.
- Hopingstone Lyngdoh, 86, Indian politician.
- Sidney Phillips, 91, American Marine (1941–1945), physician and author.
- Ulla Puolanne, 84, Finnish politician, Deputy Minister of Finance (1987-1991).
- Paul Reed, 96, American artist.
- Fred Ridgway, 92, English cricketer (Kent, England).
- Homa Rousta, 71, Iranian actress, cancer.
- Ana Seneviratne, 88, Sri Lankan diplomat and Inspector General of Police.
- Toshiya Sukegawa, 85, Japanese composer.

=== 27 ===
- Syed Ahmed, 73, Indian politician, Governor of Jharkhand (2011–2015) and Manipur (2015), cancer.
- Howard A. Anderson Jr., 95, American visual effects artist (Star Trek: The Original Series, Tobruk) and title designer (The Brady Bunch).
- Albert Blan, 85, English rugby league player (Swinton, national team).
- Odd Blomdal, 88, Norwegian judge and civil servant.
- Roland Collins, 97, English painter.
- Norm Defelice, 82, Canadian ice hockey player (Boston Bruins).
- Wilton Felder, 75, American saxophonist (The Crusaders) and session bassist (Motown).
- John Guillermin, 89, British film director and producer (The Towering Inferno, King Kong, Shaft in Africa), heart attack.
- In Style, 20, Canadian show jumping horse, euthanized.
- Pietro Ingrao, 100, Italian politician, President of the Chamber of Deputies (1976–1979), journalist and partisan.
- Hugh Jackson, 75, Irish golfer.
- Denise Lor, 86, American singer ("If I Give My Heart to You") and actress.
- Kallen Pokkudan, 78, Indian environmental activist and writer.
- Richard Rainwater, 71, American investor.
- Fred Stickel, 93, American newspaper publisher (The Oregonian).
- Frank Tyson, 85, English cricketer (Northamptonshire, England), journalist and commentator.

=== 28 ===
- Sir Peter Abbott, 73, British admiral, Vice-Chief of the Defence Staff (1997–2001), cancer.
- Frank Martinus Arion, 78, Dutch Antillean author.
- Siert Bruins, 94, Dutch war criminal.
- Michael Burgess, 70, Canadian tenor, skin cancer.
- Claudia Bär, 35, German slalom canoer, European champion (2008, 2011), leukemia.
- Catherine E. Coulson, 71, American actress and production assistant (Twin Peaks, Star Trek II: The Wrath of Khan, Eraserhead), cancer.
- Viren Dangwal, 68, Indian poet, academic, and journalist.
- Louis Armand Desrochers, 87, Canadian lawyer and academic.
- Carlos Diaz, 57, American baseball player (Los Angeles Dodgers, New York Mets).
- Alexander Faris, 94, Northern Irish composer.
- Frankie Ford, 76, American singer ("Sea Cruise").
- Robert E. Fritts, 81, American diplomat.
- Valerie Ganz, 79, Welsh painter.
- Sjur Hopperstad, 84, Norwegian politician, county mayor of Sogn og Fjordane.
- Walter Dale Miller, 89, American politician, Governor of South Dakota (1993–1995).
- Simo Rinne, 74, Finnish Olympic speed skater.
- Karsten Schwan, 63, American computer scientist, cancer.
- Atanas Tsanov, 87, Bulgarian Olympic footballer.
- Anthony Vollack, 86, American judge.
- Ignacio Zoco, 76, Spanish footballer (Real Madrid).

=== 29 ===
- Nawwaf bin Abdulaziz Al Saud, 83, Saudi Arabian prince, director of General Intelligence Directorate (2001–2005).
- Sorin Avram, 72, Romanian Olympic football player (1964) and coach (Bacău).
- Al Benecick, 78, American football player (Saskatchewan Roughriders).
- Claude Dubar, 69, French sociologist.
- Mauro Ferri, 95, Italian politician.
- Rick Foley, 70, Canadian ice hockey player (Chicago Blackhawks, Philadelphia Flyers, Detroit Red Wings).
- Gillian Gear, 72, English historian and archivist (Barnet Museum).
- Benjamin Hutto, 67, American organist, choirmaster and academic, gallbladder cancer.
- Susumu Ito, 96, American cell biologist and WW2 veteran (442nd Regiment).
- Ram Kapse, 81, Indian politician, Lieutenant Governor of Andaman and Nicobar Islands (2004–2006).
- Hellmuth Karasek, 81, German literary critic and journalist (Der Spiegel).
- William Kerslake, 85, American NASA engineer and wrestler.
- Thomas K. Lalakea, 88, American politician.
- Gilles Mayer, 86, Canadian ice hockey player (Toronto Maple Leafs).
- Sybil Collins Mobley, 89, American academic.
- Gamaliel Onosode, 82, Nigerian businessman and politician.
- Burton Raffel, 87, American literary translator and writer.
- Soaring Softly, 20, American racehorse, paddock accident.
- Jean Ter-Merguerian, 79, French violinist.
- Pat Woodell, 71, American actress (Petticoat Junction), cancer.
- Phil Woods, 83, American saxophonist ("Just the Way You Are"), emphysema.

=== 30 ===
- Allen Aldridge, 71, American football player (Toronto Argonauts, Houston Oilers, Cleveland Browns).
- Guido Altarelli, 74, Italian theoretical physicist.
- Frank Battig, 79, Austrian Olympic modern pentathlete (1960) and fencer (1968).
- Pierre de Bellefeuille, 92, Canadian politician.
- Caio César, 27, Brazilian voice actor (Harry Potter) and policeman, shot.
- Simon Cowe, 67, English guitarist (Lindisfarne).
- Claude Dauphin, 64, French business executive, co-founder and CEO of Trafigura, cancer.
- Morris E. Fine, 97, American scientist.
- Kelly Gissendaner, 47, American convicted malice murderer, executed by lethal injection.
- Göran Hägg, 68, Swedish writer and literary critic, heart attack.
- David W. Harwell, 83, American judge.
- Gerald Hawkins, 72, American politician.
- Antje Huber, 91, German politician, Federal Minister for Youth, Family and Health (1976–1982).
- Svein B. Manum, 89, Norwegian botanist.
- Eric Martin, 90, English cricketer.
- Al Romine, 84, American football player (Green Bay Packers, Chicago Bears, Denver Broncos).
- Donald Seawell, 103, American theater producer and newspaper publisher.
- Alfred Schickel, 82, German historian.
- Rick Talan, 54, Dutch footballer (AZ, Vitesse Arnhem), brain cancer.
- Ian Thwaites, 72, English cricketer.
