= 2015 in motorsport =

The following is an overview of the events of 2015 in motorsport including the major racing events, motorsport venues that were opened and closed during a year, championships and non-championship events that were established and disestablished in a year, and births and deaths of racing drivers and other motorsport people.

== Annual events ==
The calendar includes only annual major non-championship events or annual events that had significance separate from the championship. For the dates of the championship events see related season articles.

Date	Event	Ref
4–17 January	37th Dakar Rally	
24–25 January	53rd 24 Hours of Daytona	
22 February	57th Daytona 500	
16–17 May	43rd 24 Hours of Nürburgring	
24 May	73rd Monaco Grand Prix	
24 May	99th Indianapolis 500	
6–12 June	97th Isle of Man TT	
13–14 June	83rd 24 Hours of Le Mans	
25–26 July	67th 24 Hours of Spa	
26 July	38th Suzuka 8 Hours	
20 September	25th Masters of Formula 3	
11 October	58th Supercheap Auto Bathurst 1000	
20–21 November	27th Race of Champions	
22 November	62nd Macau Grand Prix	

== Disestablished championships/events ==
Last race	Championship	Ref
11 October	Formula Renault 2.0 Alps	

== Deaths ==
Date	Month	Name	Age	Nationality	Occupation	Note	Ref
5	January	Jean-Pierre Beltoise	77	French	Racing driver	1972 Monaco Grand Prix winner.	
1	May	Geoff Duke	92	British	Motorcycle racer	500cc Grand Prix motorcycle racing World champion (1951, 1953-1955).	
1	July	Robert La Caze	98	Moroccan	Racing driver	The first Moroccan Formula One driver.	
17	July	Jules Bianchi	25	French	Racing driver	2009 Formula 3 Euro Series champion and the most recent driver to be fatally injured during a Formula One Grand Prix.	
14	September	Bill Golden	81	American	Drag racer	Driver of the Little Red Wagon A/FX pickup	
6	December	Mike Mangold	60	American	Air racer	Red Bull Air World Race champion (2005, 2007).	

== See also ==
- List of 2015 motorsport champions
