= Stutz (surname) =

Stutz or Stütz is a surname that may refer to:

- Andreas Stütz (1747–1806), Austrian mineralogist
- Bruno Stutz (1938–2015), Swiss clown
- Carl Stutz (c. 1916–1996), American composer and radio announcer
- Erwin Stütz (born 1936), Swiss racewalker
- Garrett Stutz, (born 1990), American basketball player
- Geraldine Stutz (1924–2005), American business executive
- Harry C. Stutz (1876–1930), American automobile entrepreneur
- Howard Stutz (1918–2010), Canadian geneticist and professor
- Jakob Stutz (1801–1877), Swiss writer
- Josef Stutz (1877–1948), Swiss politician
- Stanley Stutz (1920–1975), American basketball player

== See also ==
- Edmond de Stoutz (1920–1997), Swiss conductor
