= Stutz (disambiguation) =

Stutz typically refers to the Stutz Motor Car Company, an American luxury car manufacturer.

Stutz may also refer to:

- Stutz (surname), and a list of people with the name
- Gerhard Stüdemann (1920–1988), a Luftwaffe pilot nicknamed "Stutz"
- Stutz (film), a 2022 documentary directed by Jonah Hill
