= Herbert Meyer =

Herbert Meyer may refer to:

- Herbert Oskar Meyer (1875–1941), German jurist and historian
- Herbert A. Meyer (1886–1950), U.S. representative
- Herbert Meyer, film director of the 1939 film Bad Boy
- Herbert Meyer (footballer) (born 1948), German footballer
- Herbert Meyer (hurdler), winner of the 70 yards hurdles at the 1924 USA Indoor Track and Field Championships

== See also ==
- Herbert Mayr (1943–2015), politician from South Tyrol
- Herbert Meier (born 1928), Swiss writer and translator
- H. V. Meyerowitz (Herbert V. Meyerowitz, 1900–1945), artist, educator and British colonial administrator in Africa
