= Ian Payne =

Ian Payne may refer to:

- Ian Payne (sports broadcaster) (born 1962), British television sports broadcaster
- Ian Payne (newsreader) (born 1968), British television newsreader
- Ian Payne (New Zealand cricketer) (1921–2011), New Zealand cricketer
- Ian Payne (English cricketer) (born 1958), English cricketer
- Ian Payne (South African cricketer) (1949–2015), South African cricketer
- Ian Payne (footballer) (born 1947), Australian rules footballer
