= Dalmonte =

Dalmonte is a surname. Notable people with the surname include:

- Antonio Dalmonte (1919–2015), Italian footballer
- Luca Dalmonte (born 1963), Italian basketball coach
