= Ohr (disambiguation) =

Ohr is a Kabbalistic concept in which light is used as a way of describing divine attributes.

OHR or Ohr may also refer to:

== People ==
- Bruce Ohr, American attorney
- Fred Ohr (1919–2015), American World War II fighter pilot
- George E. Ohr (1857–1918), American art potter
- Martine Ohr (born 1964), Dutch field hockey player
- Stian Ohr (born 1978), Norwegian footballer

== Organizations ==
- Office of the High Representative, in Bosnia and Herzegovina
- Ohr (record label), a German record label

== See also ==
- Ohr Somayach (disambiguation)
- Official Hamster Republic Role Playing Game Construction Engine, a video game engine abbreviated as OHR
