= Harald Norbelie =

Swedish journalist and writer

- Born: 5 October 1944
- Died: 6 September 2015 (aged 70); Västergarn
- Occupation: Writer, journalist

John Harald Norbelie (October 5, 1944 – September 6, 2015) was a Swedish journalist and writer. His writing mainly focused on Stockholm's local history and culture. After being diagnosed with prostate cancer in 2004, Norbeile became a vocal proponent of euthanasia. In that capacity his main argument was that assisting a terminally ill patient to die might be a better choice than requiring that the patient continued to suffer.
