= Poole Gakuin College =

Higher education institution in Osaka Prefecture, Japan

Coordinates: 34°29′00″N 135°32′03″E

- プール学院大学短期大学部
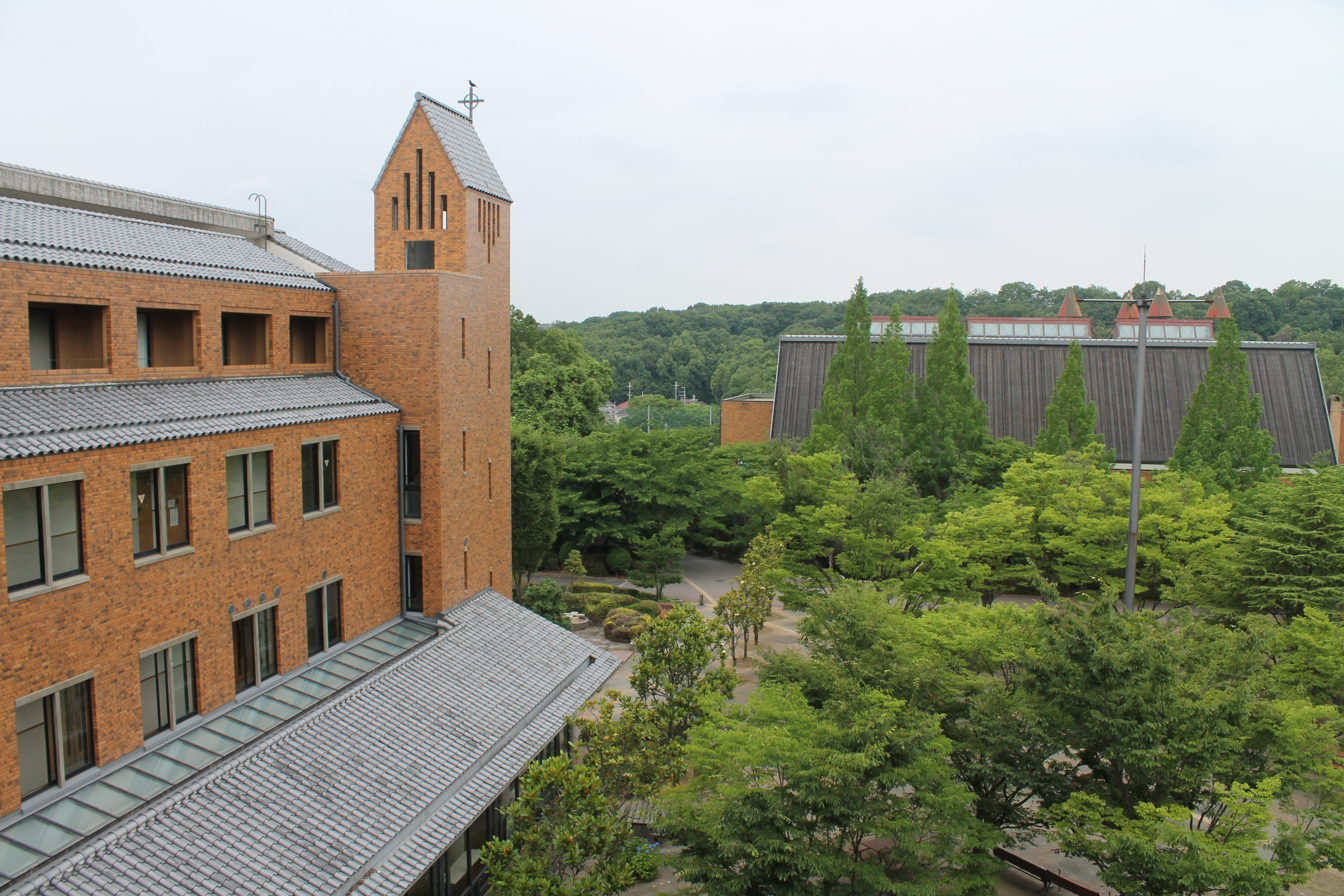
- The main campus, June 2013
- Type: Private
- Active: 1950–2021
- Location: Minami-ku, Sakai, Osaka Prefecture, Japan
- Website: www.poole.ac.jp

Poole Gakuin College (プール学院大学短期大学部, Pūru Gakuin Daigaku Tanki Daigakubu) was a private Christian junior college in Minami-ku, Sakai, Osaka Prefecture, Japan.The college was established in 1950 and closed in 2021.

== See also ==
- List of junior colleges in Japan
- Poole Gakuin University
