= Kazuaki Kimura =

Japanese literary scholar

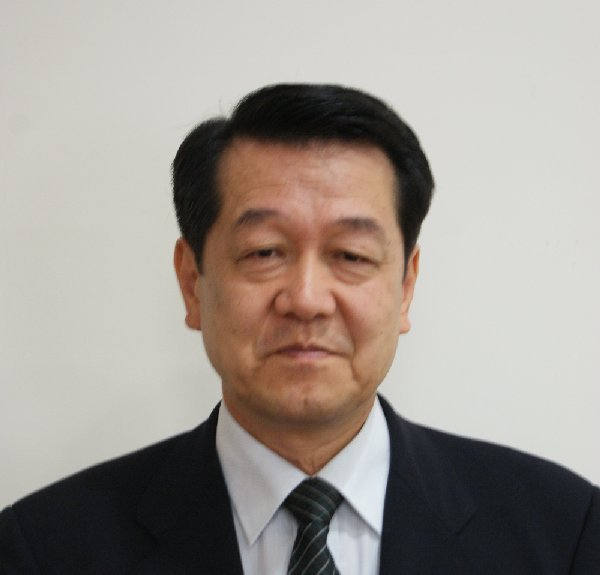
- Born: 24 April 1946; Fukuoka, Japan
- Died: 26 September 2015 (aged 69); Osaka, Japan
- Education: Kwansei Gakuin University
- Scientific career
- Fields: Modern Japanese Literature

Kazuaki Kimura (木村 一信, Kimura Kazuaki; 24 April 1946 – 26 September 2015) was a Japanese scholar of modern Japanese literature. He was a professor at Ritsumeikan University and held senior administrative roles at Ritsumeikan Asia Pacific University and Poole Gakuin University. His research focused on the writer Atsushi Nakajima, a writer at the beginning of the Shōwa period.

== Career ==
Kimura began his academic career as an associate professor at Kumamoto Joshi Daigaku in 1979. In 1984, he served as a visiting professor in the Faculty of Letters at the University of Indonesia. He joined Ritsumeikan University in 1991 as a professor in the Faculty of Letters.

In 2000, Kimura became a professor at Ritsumeikan Asia Pacific University in Beppu, where he served as Vice Rector of Student Affairs. He received a Doctor of Literature from Ritsumeikan University in 2000. He later returned to Ritsumeikan University, serving as Dean of the Faculty of Letters in 2005. In 2006, he became director of the Kyoto Prefectural Domoto Insho Art Museum (Kyotofuritsu Domotoinsho Bijutsukan).

Kimura was named Professor Emeritus of Ritsumeikan University in 2010. That year he became president of Poole Gakuin University in Osaka, and was later named Professor Emeritus of Poole Gakuin University in 2014. In 2015, he became president of the College of Osaka Seikei.

== Selected works ==
- Aki yoru no dokushoki. Musashino Shobo Publishing Co., 1984.
- Nakajima Atsushiron. Sobunsha, 1986.
- Mo hitotsu no bungakushi: Senso e no manazashi. Zoshinkai Shuppansha, 1996.
- Showa sakka no Minami Hiroyuki. Sekai Shiso-sha, 2004.
- Fuan ni ikiru bungakushi: Ogai Mori kara Nakagami Kenji made. Sobunsha, 2008.
