= 7545 Smaklösa =

Main-belt asteroid

Discovery
- Discovered by: C.-I. Lagerkvist
- Discovery site: Mount Stromlo Obs.
- Discovery date: 28 July 1978

Designations
- Named after: Smaklösa (Swedish band)
- Alternative designations: 1978 OB · 1995 OP
- Minor planet category: main-belt · (inner) background

Orbital characteristics
- Epoch 4 September 2017 (JD 2458000.5)
- Uncertainty parameter 0
- Observation arc: 38.61 yr (14,104 days)
- Aphelion: 2.7888 AU
- Perihelion: 1.7342 AU
- Semi-major axis: 2.2615 AU
- Eccentricity: 0.2332
- Orbital period (sidereal): 3.40 yr (1,242 days)
- Mean anomaly: 174.45°
- Mean motion: 0° 17^{m} 23.28^{s} / day
- Inclination: 6.5200°
- Longitude of ascending node: 114.89°
- Argument of perihelion: 200.04°

Physical characteristics
- Dimensions: 4.131±0.112 km 4.30 km (calculated)
- Synodic rotation period: 14.3002±0.0218 h 14.322±0.004; 14.330±0.220 h
- Geometric albedo: 0.20 (assumed); 0.237±0.025
- Spectral type: S
- Absolute magnitude (H): 14.1 · 14.2 · 14.650±0.300 (R) · 14.666±0.005 (R)

7545 Smaklösa, provisional designation 1978 OB, is a stony background asteroid from the inner regions of the asteroid belt, approximately 4 kilometers in diameter. It was discovered on 28 July 1978, by Swedish astronomer Claes-Ingvar Lagerkvist at Mount Stromlo Observatory in Canberra, Australia. The asteroid was named for the Swedish band Smaklösa.

== Orbit and classification ==
Smaklösa orbits the Sun in the inner main-belt at a distance of 1.7–2.8 AU once every 3 years and 5 months (1,242 days). Its orbit has an eccentricity of 0.23 and an inclination of 7° with respect to the ecliptic. As no precoveries were taken, the asteroid's observation arc begins with its discovery in 1978.

== Physical characteristics ==
=== Lightcurves ===
In August 2012, a rotational lightcurve of Smaklösa was obtained at the Oakley Southern Sky Observatory in Coonabarabran, Australia. The photometric observation showed a well-defined rotation period of 14.322±0.004 hours with a brightness variation of 0.75 in magnitude (U=3). Similar periods of 14.330±0.220 and 14.3002±0.0218 hours were derived at the U.S Palomar Transient Factory in 2014 (U=2/2).

=== Diameter and albedo ===
According to the survey carried out by the NEOWISE mission of NASA's Wide-field Infrared Survey Explorer, Smaklösa measures 4.1 kilometers in diameter and its surface has an albedo of 0.24, while the Collaborative Asteroid Lightcurve Link assumes a standard albedo for stony asteroids of 0.20 and calculates a diameter of 4.3 kilometers.

== Naming ==
This minor planet was named after the Gotlandic music group Smaklösa. (Literally "Flavourless", but also "Tasteless" or "Tacky". The latter meaning is intended here as indicated by the name of their own record label "Tasteless Records").

The Swedish band gave a number of concerts on the island of Gotland. They are known for their cleverly phrased lyrics mixed with the local humor of the island. The discoverer of this minor planet has named it after the band, grateful for having attended their concerts in 1998, which are unforgettable to him. The official naming citation was published by the Minor Planet Center on 8 December 1998 (M.P.C. 33387).

== See also ==
- List of Gotland-related asteroids
