= Ohr Somayach =

Ohr Somayach may refer to:

- Ohr Somayach (book), commentary by Rabbi Meir Simcha of Dvinsk
  - Ohr Somayach, common reference to Rabbi Meir Simcha of Dvinsk
- Ohr Somayach, Jerusalem, a network of yeshivas based in Israel
- Ohr Somayach, Monsey, a yeshiva in the United States
- Ohr Somayach, South Africa, South African affiliate of Ohr Somayach, Jerusalem

== See also ==
- Ohr (disambiguation)
