= Dodge Van =

Dodge Van may refer to:

- Dodge A100 and A108, a compact mid-engine van sold from 1964 to 1970
- Dodge B-series/Ram van, a full-sized van sold from 1971 to 2002
- Dodge Caravan, a minivan sold from 1984 until 2020
- Dodge Sprinter, a van, chassis cab, and minibus built by Daimler AG
- Dodge 50 Series, later known as the Renault 50 Series, were light commercial vehicles produced in the UK by Chrysler Europe and later Renault Véhicules Industriels
  - RB44, a four-wheel-drive version based loosely on the Dodge van
