= Guy Thwaites =

British physician, clinical microbiologist and former cricketer

- Born: Guy Edward Thwaites; 19 January 1971 (age 55); Brighton, Sussex, England
- Occupations: Physician, clinical microbiologist, academic
- Employer: University of Oxford
- Title: Professor of Infectious Diseases
- Family: Ian Thwaites (father)
- Awards: Member of the Order of the British Empire (MBE)

Guy Edward Thwaites MBE (born 19 January 1971) is a British professor of infectious diseases at the University of Oxford. He was director of the Oxford University Clinical Research Unit (OUCRU) in Ho Chi Minh City in Vietnam from October 2013 to January 2026. His research focus is on severe bacterial infections, including meningitis and Staphylococcus aureus bloodstream infection, and tuberculosis. He is a former first-class cricketer.

== Early life and education ==
Guy Thwaites was born in Brighton in January 1971, to cricketer and physician Ian Thwaites. He was educated at Eastbourne College, before going up to Girton College, Cambridge. There he completed his pre-clinical years before doing a year in art history. While studying at Cambridge, Thwaites played first-class cricket for Cambridge University Cricket Club in 1991 and 1992. Subsequently, he gained admission to study medicine at the United Medical and Dental Schools of Guy's and St Thomas' Hospitals, from where he graduated.

While a student, with a friend doing a history PhD, he came across the story of sudor anglicus, the mysterious English sweating sickness of the 15th and 16th centuries. In 1998, five years after the hantavirus outbreak in the US made headlines, and then working at St Thomas' Hospital, he co-authored a paper hypothesising that the mysterious medieval illness was very similar to that in the US and could have been hantavirus pulmonary syndrome. After discovering the grave of Henry Brandon, who he believed had been affected by the illness, he did not propose plans to exhume the body for DNA analysis.

== Career ==
Thwaites trained in infectious diseases and microbiology at Brighton and Sussex University Hospitals, the Oxford University Clinical Research Unit (OUCRU) in Ho Chi Minh City in Vietnam, and the Hospital for Tropical Diseases, London. In Vietnam he was a Wellcome Trust Clinician Scientist Fellow and mentored by Nicholas White and Jeremy Farrar. After more than four years there he returned to London, and two years later joined the MRC Centre for Molecular Bacteriology and Infection at Imperial College, where he worked on the bacteria Mycobacterium tuberculosis. He was appointed honorary consultant in infectious disease at Guy's and St Thomas' Hospitals and Reader in Infectious Diseases at King's College London from 2011 to 2013.

In 2013 Thwaites returned to Vietnam as director of the OUCRU, replacing Farrar. He was appointed professor of infectious diseases at the University of Oxford in 2014. His research focuses on life-threatening bacterial infections, including meningitis and Staphylococcus aureus bloodstream infection, and tuberculosis. He is an authority on the diagnosis and treatment of tuberculous meningitis. In January 2026 he stepped down as OUCRU director and returned to the United Kingdom, taking a position as Professor of Infectious Disease in the Nuffield Department of Medicine, University of Oxford, and Honorary Infectious Diseases consultant in Oxford University Hospitals NHS Foundation Trust.

== Honours ==
In 2018 he was elected a Fellow of the Academy of Medical Sciences in the UK. He holds honorary professorship at the MRC Clinical Trial Units at University College London. In 2021 he was appointed a Member of the Order of the British Empire (MBE) for services to public health.

In 2023 he received the Commemorative Medal "For the People's Health" from Vietnam's Ministry of Health, and in 2025 he received a Certificate of Merit from the Chair of the Ho Chi Minh City People's Committee, recognising contributions to health in Vietnam.

In 2026, he was awarded the Vietnam Prime Minister's Certificate of Merit for contributions to healthcare in Vietnam.

== Selected publications ==
- Thwaites, Guy; Taviner, Mark; Gant, Vanya (20 February 1997). "The English Sweating Sickness, 1485 to 1551". New England Journal of Medicine. 336 (8): 580–582. doi:10.1056/NEJM199702203360812. ISSN 0028-4793. PMID 9023099.
- Donovan, Joseph; Bang, Nguyen Duy; Imran, Diana; Nghia, Ho Dang Trung; Burhan, Erlina; Huong, Do Thi Thu; Hiep, Nguyen Thi Thanh; Ngoc, Le Hoang Bao; Thanh, Do Van; Thanh, Nguyen Thi; Wardhani, Anis Luthfia S.; Maharani, Kiki; Gasmara, Candra P.; Hanh, Nguyen Hoang H.; Oanh, Pham Kim N.; Estiasari, Ratna; Thu, Duong Duc Anh; Kusumaningrum, Anis; Dung, Luong Thi; Giang, Doan Chi; Ha, Do Thi Minh; Lan, Nguyen Huu; Chau, Nguyen Van Vinh; Nguyet, Nguyen Thi Minh; Geskus, Ronald B.; Thuong, Nguyen Thi Thuong; Kestelyn, Evelyne; Hamers, Rogier L.; Phu, Nguyen Hoan; Thwaites, Guy E.; et al. (ACT HIV Investigators) (12 October 2023). "Adjunctive Dexamethasone for Tuberculous Meningitis in HIV-Positive Adults". New England Journal of Medicine. 389 (15): 1357–1367. doi:10.1056/NEJMoa2216218. hdl:2066/301541. PMID 37819954.
- Thwaites, Guy; Nahid, Payam; Szubert, A.; Nsutebu, E.; Tilley, R.; Greig, J.; Wyllie, S. A.; Wilson, P.; Auckland, C.; Cairns, J.; Ward, D.; Lal, P.; Guleri, A.; Jenkins, N.; Sutton, J.; Wiselka, M.; Armando, G. R.; Graham, C.; Chadwick, P. R.; Barlow, G.; Gordon, N. C.; Young, B.; Meisner, S.; McWhinney, P.; Price, D. A.; Harvey, D.; Nayar, D.; Jeyaratnam, D.; Planche, T.; Minton, J.; Hudson, F.; Hopkins, S.; Williams, J.; Török, M. E. (5 March 2020). "Triumph and Tragedy of 21st Century Tuberculosis Drug Development". New England Journal of Medicine. 382 (10): 959–960. doi:10.1056/NEJMe2000860. PMID 32130819.
- Heemskerk, Annemieke D.; Bang, Nguyen Duy; Mai, Nguyen T.; Chau, Tran T.; Phu, Nguyen H. (14 January 2016). "Intensified Antituberculosis Therapy in Adults with Tuberculous Meningitis". New England Journal of Medicine. 374 (2): 124–134. doi:10.1056/NEJMoa1507062. PMID 26760084.
- Thwaites, G. E.; Nguyen, D. B.; Nguyen, H. D.; Hoang, T. Q.; Do, T. T.; Nguyen, T. C.; Nguyen, Q. H.; Nguyen, T. T.; Nguyen, N. H.; Nguyen, T. N.; Nguyen, N. L.; Nguyen, H. D.; Vu, N. T.; Cao, H. H.; Tran, T. H.; Pham, P. M.; Nguyen, T. D.; Stepniewska, K.; White, N. J.; Tran, T. H.; Farrar, J. J. (21 October 2004). "Dexamethasone for the treatment of tuberculous meningitis in adolescents and adults". New England Journal of Medicine. 351 (17): 1741–1751. doi:10.1056/NEJMoa040573.
