= Västergarn Church =

- Västergarns kyrka
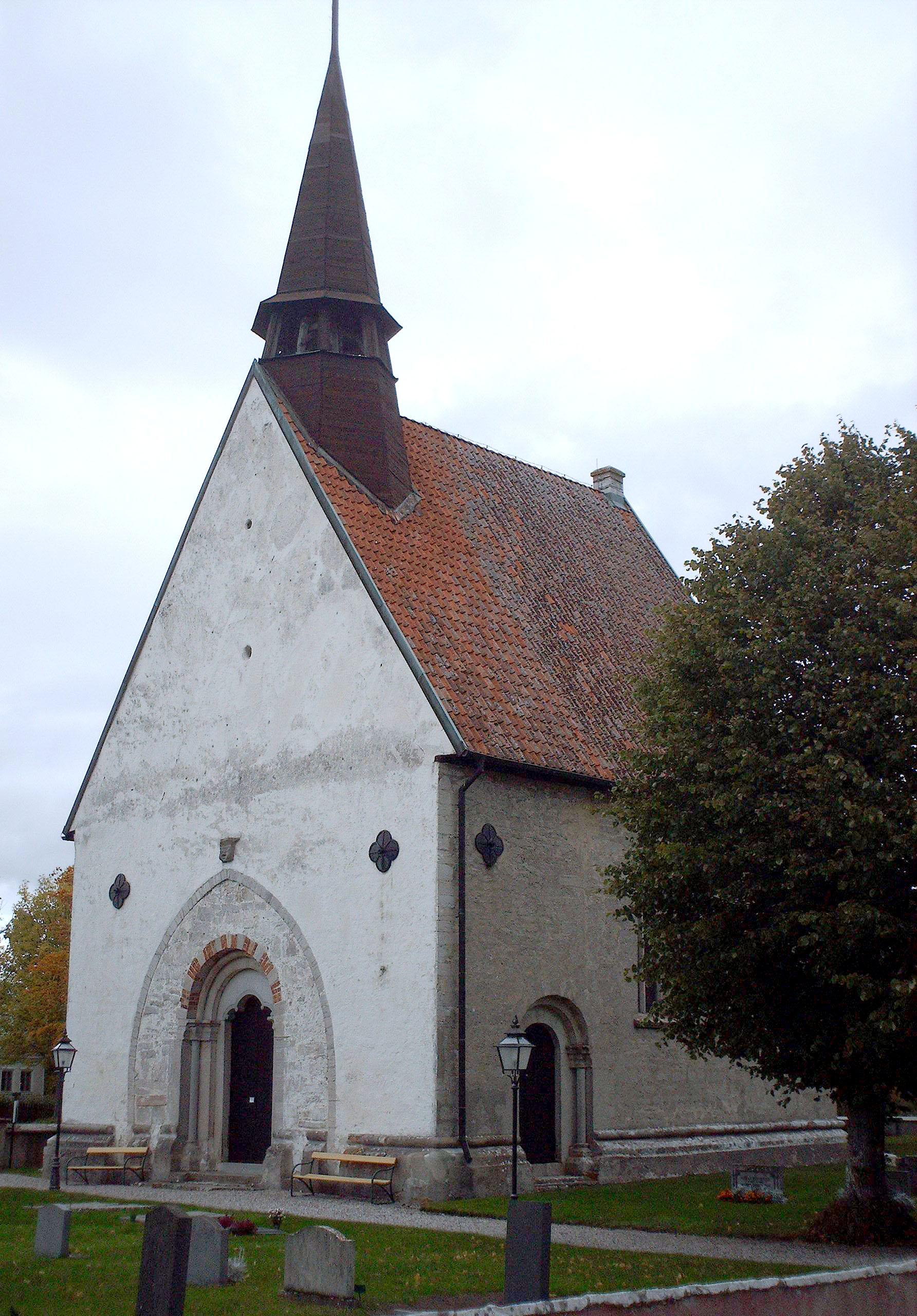
- Västergarn Church, view of the exterior

- Location within Gotland
- 57°26′27″N 18°09′03″E
- Country: Sweden
- Denomination: Church of Sweden

Administration
- Diocese: Visby

Västergarn Church (Swedish: Västergarns kyrka) is a medieval Lutheran church in Västergarn on the island of Gotland, Sweden. It belongs to the Diocese of Visby.

== History and architecture ==
North of the presently visible church are the foundations of an earlier, Romanesque church. The current church, built in the middle of the 13th century, is only the choir of an envisioned, much larger church. It was never finished, perhaps due to a decline in local fortunes that set in with a civil war on Gotland in 1288. Most of the interior dates from the time after the Reformation. A noteworthy item is the votive ship, dating from 1637.
