= Paviken =

Lake in the country of Sweden

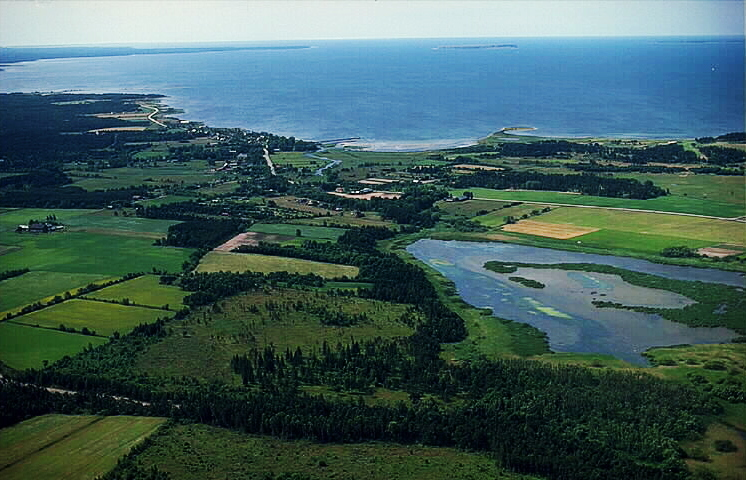
- Västergarn and Paviken

- Location within Gotland
- Location: Västergarns socken, Gotland
- Coordinates: 57.45519°N 18.14070°E
- Type: freshwater lake
- Primary outflows: Idå
- Catchment area: 20.48 km^{2} (7.91 sq mi)
- Basin countries: Sweden
- Surface area: 0.272 km^{2} (0.105 sq mi)
- Shore length^{1}: 2.63 km (1.63 mi)
- Surface elevation: 0 m (0 ft)
- Frozen: winter
- ^{1} Shore length is not a well-defined measure.

Paviken is a lake in Västergarn on the western side of the island of Gotland. The lake is a popular birding and fishing site.

The lake is drained by the river Idå. The lake and its surroundings form a nature reserve which is more populated by birds than any other reserve on the island. In 1994, the reserve was designated a Natura 2000 area. During spring and autumn it is a stop-over site for migratory birds; a total of 240 species have been observed in the area. The lake offers fishing principally for perch and pike.

During the Viking Age, Paviken was a sheltered bay and cove connected to the Baltic Sea by a narrow strait. It formed a natural harbour which was improved by jetties. These were built during the 8th century and were used for about 300 years until the harbour became too shallow. Subsequently, the harbour and commercial activity were moved to nearby Västergarn harbor. Dating from the early 1960s, archaeological investigations have found remains of port facilities, buildings and burial grounds.
