= Ian Thwaites =

English cricketer

Personal information
- Full name: Ian Guy Thwaites
- Born: 4 March 1943; Brighton, Sussex, England
- Died: 30 September 2015 (aged 72)
- Source: ESPNcricinfo, 29 June 2016

Ian Thwaites (4 March 1943 – 30 September 2015) was an English physician and cricketer. He played twenty-two first-class matches for Cambridge University Cricket Club between 1963 and 1964.

== Biography ==
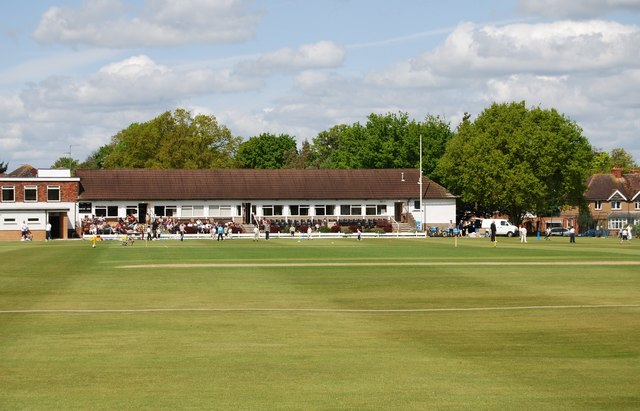
Horsham Cricket Club

Ian Thwaites was born in 1943 in Brighton, the youngest child of four to Guy Thwaites, a local general practitioner (GP). He was educated at Eastbourne College and Gonville and Caius College, Cambridge, where he studied Natural Sciences. He played cricket for Sussex Second XI and Cambridge University, and in 1964 won a Blue. Following training in medicine at Cambridge and St Thomas’ Hospital, he became a doctor and worked in Africa before moving to Horsham, where he worked for over 40 years, first as a GP, and then as a private sports physician. The cricketer Christopher Martin-Jenkins, in his autobiography CMJ – A Cricketing Life, describes being treated by him. Thwaites was a member of Horsham Cricket Club, where he played cricket for many years, and he was a co-founder of Keep Southwater Green.

His son, Guy, also played first-class cricket for Cambridge University.

He died from prostate cancer on 30 September 2015.

== See also ==
- List of Cambridge University Cricket Club players
