= Stanton R. Cook =

American newspaper executive

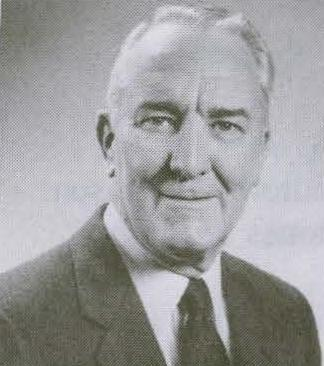
Cook circa 1987

Stanton Rufus Cook (July 3, 1925 – September 3, 2015) was a chief executive of the Chicago Tribune. He took the newspaper public in 1983.
