= Dan S. Budd =

American politician

Member of the Wyoming House of Representatives
- In office 1981–?

Personal details
- Born: Dan Sellon Budd; February 26, 1927 Big Piney, Wyoming, U.S.
- Died: September 9, 2015 (aged 88) Pinedale, Wyoming, U.S.
- Party: Republican
- Education: Utah State University
- Occupation: rancher

Dan Sellon Budd (February 26, 1927 – September 9, 2015) was an American politician in the state of Wyoming. He served in the Wyoming House of Representatives as a member of the Republican Party. He attended Utah State University and was a rancher.
