= Josef Stutz =

Swiss politician

Josef Stutz (18 April 1877 – 30 July 1948) was a member of the Swiss National Council from 1932 until 1947 for the Conservative Party (Katholisch-Konservative Partei, today CVP), founder, in 1911, of the Swiss Fruit Traders Association (now Schweizerischer Obstverband) and Director of the then newly established Farming School of the Canton of Zug (Landwirtschaftliche Winterschule Zug) from 1917 to 1947. He was born in Schongau (LU) and died at the age of 71 in Zug.
