= Giovanni De Vivo =

Italian Catholic Bishop

- Bishop of Pescia
- Church: Catholic Church
- Diocese: Diocese of Pescia
- In office: 18 December 1993 – 20 September 2015
- Predecessor: Giovanni Bianchi
- Successor: Roberto Filippini

Orders
- Ordination: 15 March 1964 by Francesco Niccoli
- Consecration: 23 January 1994 by Gaetano Bonicelli

Personal details
- Born: 24 March 1940 Siena, Province of Siena, Kingdom of Italy
- Died: 20 September 2015 (aged 75) Pescia, Province of Pistoia, Italy
- Coat of arms

Giovanni De Vivo (24 March 1940 – 20 September 2015) was an Italian Roman Catholic bishop.

He was born in Siena and ordained a priest in 1964. De Vivo was named bishop of Pescia in December 1993 and ordained in 1994 by bishop Francesco Niccoli. He died still in office in 2015.
