= Carter Lay =

American businessman

Jessy Chapman Carter Lay (January 12, 1971 – September 3, 2015) was an American businessman, philanthropist, and an heir to part of the Frito-Lay family fortune. Herman Lay sold Frito-Lay to Pepsico in 1965. Lay, 44, had 2 children and avidly supported music education. Suffering from leukemia, he was found dead in his Los Angeles home according to the Los Angeles County Coroner's Office. Officials believe no foul play was involved.

== Personal life ==
Lay was the grandson of Frito-Lay founder Herman Lay. His grandfather had launched the business through his company H.W. Lay & Company and later through Frito-Lay, Inc. before the company became a division of PepsiCo, Inc. in 1965.

Carter Lay had leukemia. He formed the Carter Lay Charitable Fund, a charity to "raise awareness and funds to support cancer research, art programs in numerous Children's hospitals, promote healthy living and lifestyle, after school kids' programs, music education, and to build schools around the world to help children earn an education". Lay, 44, a recovering heroin addict, had 2 children.
