= Boomer Castleman =

American singer-songwriter (1945–2015)

Owens "Boomer" Castleman (July 18, 1945 – September 1, 2015) was an American singer-songwriter and guitarist.

== Career as musician ==
He was born and raised in Farmers Branch, Texas, United States. Castleman first started playing professionally at age 17 while a high school student in Dallas. He and a Ft. Worth teenager, John Deutschendorf, played on the folk circuit together, and Castleman was present at a club in Los Angeles when his friend agreed to change his name to John Denver. Castleman and another musician from Dallas, Michael Nesmith, then formed a band called the Survivors. When Nesmith left to help create The Monkees, he was replaced by Dallas native Michael Martin Murphey. Soon thereafter, Castleman, Murphey, and bassist John London formed the 1960s pop group The Lewis & Clarke Expedition, with Lewis and Clarke being pseudonyms for Murphy and Castleman. They recorded a pop album in 1967 for Colgems, the label that also released The Monkees. Castleman and Murphey wrote "(What Am I Doin') Hangin' Round," (also as Lewis and Clarke), which was recorded by the Monkees and featured on three episodes of their television show. The duo's songs were also recorded by such musicians as Lyle Lovett, Ray Wylie Hubbard and Rusty Wier. Locally, they were probably best known for writing, "Ft. Worth, I Love You."

As a solo artist, Castleman hit the US charts in 1975 with the single "Judy Mae", which peaked at No. 33. In so doing, he became a career musician sometimes considered a "one hit wonder."

As a Nashville studio guitarist, Castleman backed such singers as Tammy Wynette, Linda Ronstadt, Kenny Rogers, George Jones, and Roy Clark.

== Career within music ==
Castleman invented the palm pedal, a device that allows guitar players to execute pedal steel-style string bends. He made his original prototype in 1968. It is marketed under the name Bigsby Palm Pedal. The original patent has expired, allowing other vendors to market similar devices, but the Bigsby/Castleman version is the original.

Castleman founded the independent country music record label BNA Records which he later sold to BMG Music.

== Personal ==
He first attended St. Mark's School of Texas and Woodberry Forest School before graduating from Occidental College.

He died in September 2015, at the age of 70, and is survived by two daughters, Anne Marie and Breck.
