= Denis Sonet =

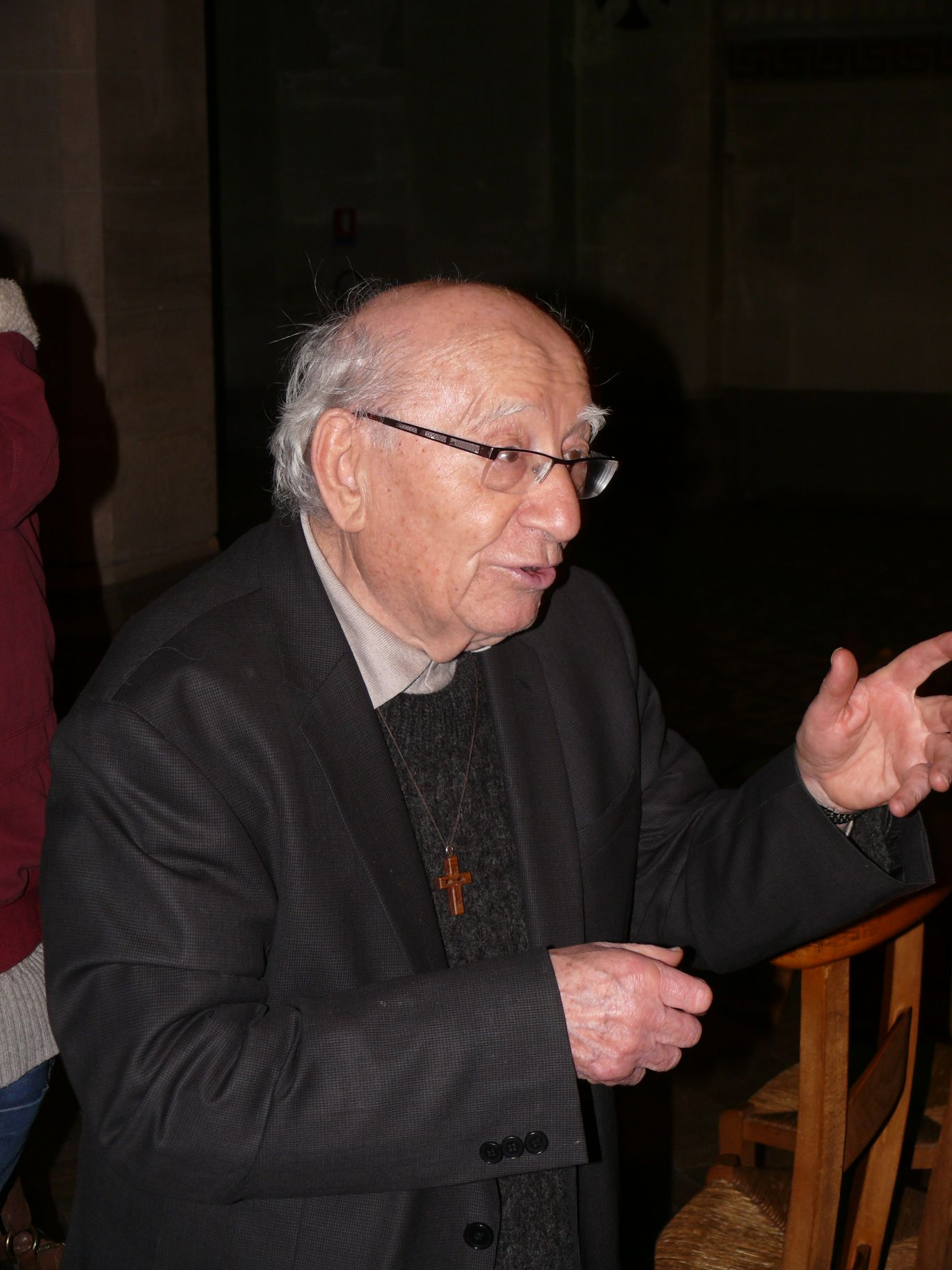
- Born: 1926
- Died: 23 September 2015 (aged 88–89)
- Occupation: Priest

Denis Sonet (1926 – 23 September 2015) was a French Catholic priest, chaplain, marriage counselor, and educator in the CLER Love and Family branch from 1969 to his death.
