= St. Andrew's University of Education =

Coordinates: 34°28′59.9″N 135°32′4″E

- 桃山学院教育大学
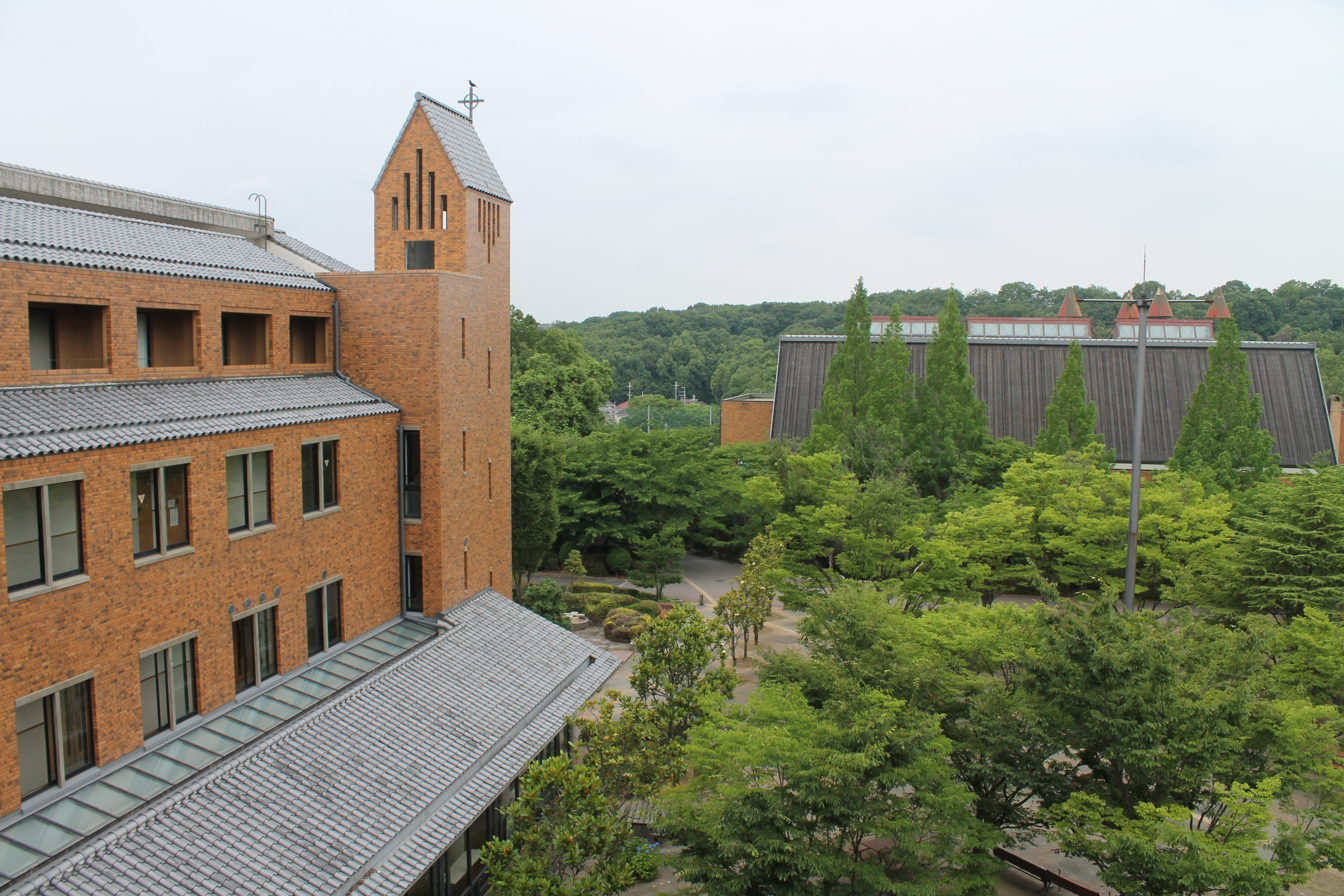
- Former name: Poole Gakuin University
- Type: Christian, Private University
- Affiliations: Momoyama Gakuin (学校法人桃山学院) organization
- Location: Sakai, Osaka, Japan

St. Andrew's University of Education (桃山学院教育大学, Momoyama gakuin kyōiku daigaku), formerly Poole Gakuin University (プール学院大学, Pũru Gakuin Daigaku), is a Christian private university in Sakai, Osaka, Japan.

It is a part of the Momoyama Gakuin (学校法人桃山学院) organization.

Poole Gakuin College received university status in 1995 and the university's first year began in 1996. It had an intercultural studies program as its first four-year program. The Japan University Accreditation Association accredited the university in 2001.
