= Rebecca Shaw (author) =

British writer

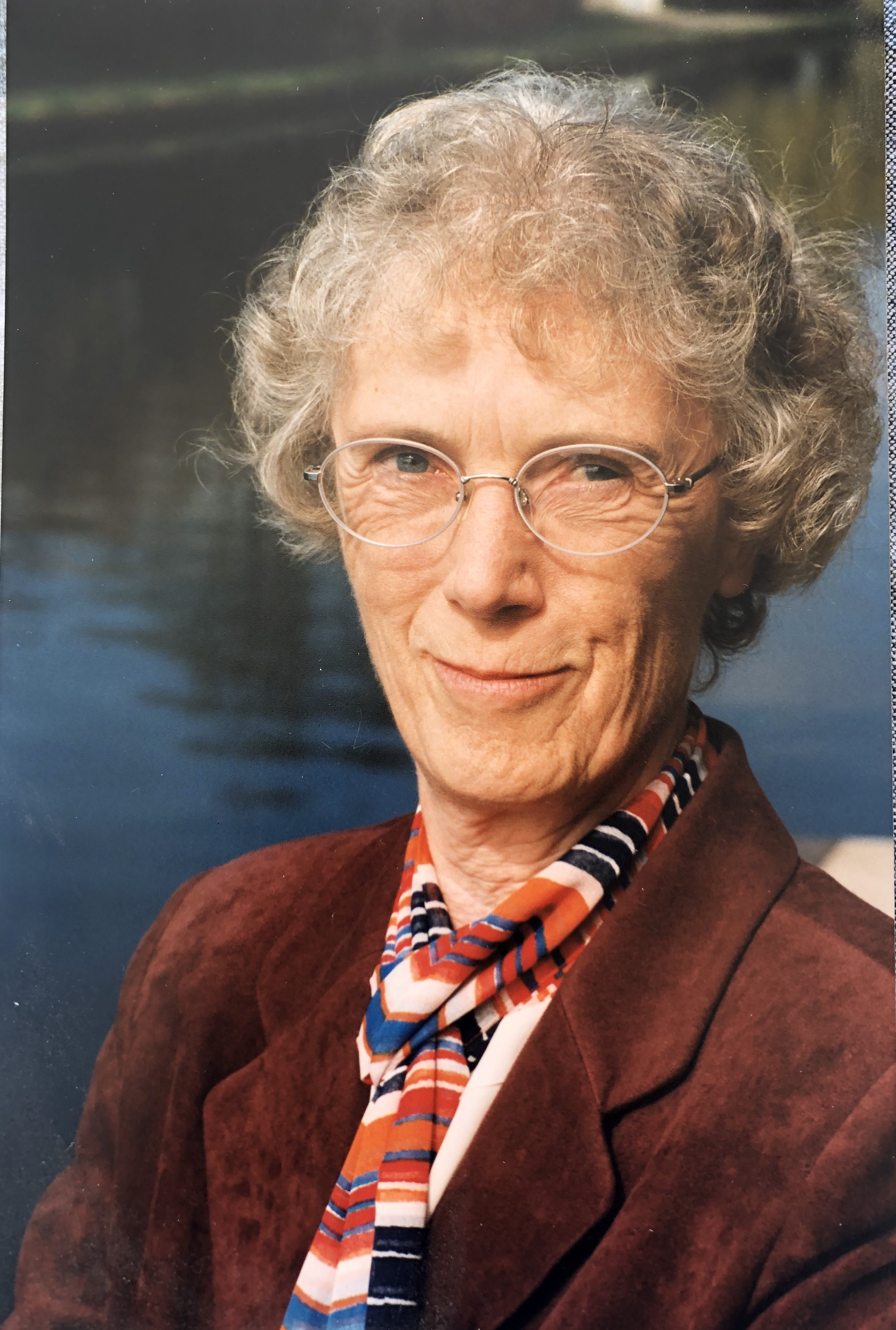
- Shaw in 2020
- Born: 1931; Leeds, England
- Died: 7 September 2015; Dorchester, Dorset
- Occupations: Writer, teacher of deaf children
- Partner: Married
- Children: 4
- Writing career
- Language: English
- Genre: Fiction
- Subject: Country life
- Website: rebeccashaw.me

Rebecca Shaw was the Sunday Times bestselling author of 28 novels published by Orion Publishing Group. She sold more than one million copies. Her books came in two series, Barleybridge and Turnham Malpas, and revolved around the loves and lives of countryside dwellers. She also published three standalone eBooks.

== Biography ==
Shaw grew up in Armley, Leeds, and attended the progressive independent co-educational Wennington School. She became a school teacher and worked with deaf children. She lived with her husband, father of her four children, in a Dorset village where she found inspiration for her much-loved classic stories about rural life.

In an interview with Shaw in the Sunday Telegraph, Rebecca Tyrell said Shaw was 'a very gifted storyteller and that is quite an art.'

A review in The Telegraph for 'A Village Deception' described her style as 'The Archers meet Midsomer Murders'.

Shaw wrote 19 books based in the fictional village of Turnham Malpas, six books based in the fictional village of Barleybridge, and three ebooks.

Shaw died in 2015 after a major stroke. She was survived for two years by her husband, who subsequently died on 25 December 2017, and her four children.

== Selected works ==
=== Based in the fictional village of Turnham Malpas ===
1. The New Rector (1994)
2. Talk of the Village (1995)
3. Village Matters (1996)
4. The Village Show (1997)
5. Village Secrets (1998)
6. Scandal in the Village (1999)
7. Village Gossip (1999)
8. Trouble in the Village (2000)
9. A Village Dilemma (2002)
10. Intrigue in the Village (2003)
11. Whispers in the Village (2005)
12. A Village Feud (2006)
13. The Village Green Affair (2008)
14. The Village Newcomers (2010)
15. A Village Deception (2011)
16. A Village in Jeopardy (2012)
17. Village Fortunes (2014)
18. Village Rumours (2015)
19. Mystery in the Village (2015)

=== Based in the fictional village of Barleybridge ===
1. A Country Affair (2001)
2. Country Wives (2001)
3. Country Lovers (2003)
4. Country Passions (2004)
5. One Hot Country Summer (2007)
6. Love in the Country (2009)

=== eBooks ===
1. The House at Spinnaker Cove (2014)
2. Curtain Up (2014)
3. The Love of a Family (2018)
