= Neil Rosendorff =

South African cricketer (1945–2015)

Personal information
- Born: 22 January 1945; Bloemfontein, South Africa
- Died: 12 September 2015 (aged 70); Bloemfontein, South Africa
- Source: Cricinfo, 24 March 2016

Neil Rosendorff (22 January 1945 – 12 September 2015) was a South African cricketer. He played 70 first-class matches for Orange Free State between 1962 and 1979.
