= Egon Sundberg =

Swedish footballer

Personal information
- Full name: Egon William Sundberg
- Date of birth: 27 February 1911
- Place of birth: Ockelbo, Sweden
- Date of death: 4 September 2015 (aged 104)
- Position: Left winger

Senior career*
Years	Team	Apps	(Gls)
1934–1941	Sandvikens IF	113	(23)
- * Club domestic league appearances and goals

Egon William Sundberg (27 February 1911 – 4 September 2015) was a Swedish football left winger who played for Sandvikens IF in Allsvenskan. He made his debut in August 1934 against Sundsvall IF. He decided to retire from football in 1939, but made a comeback in 1941 during the Second World War. In total, he played 113 games and scored 23 goals.

Sundberg was also a musician with his own orchestra and later had a job adding music to silent films that were shown in the cinema. On his 102nd birthday, he was noted as being the oldest living person to have played in the Swedish Allsvenskan. He died at the age of 104 in 2015.
