= Valerie Ganz =

British artist (1936–2015)

Valerie Ganz (1936–2015) was a Welsh artist, known for her paintings of South Wales coal miners.

== Life and work ==
Ganz grew up in Mumbles of Swansea. She studied art in Swansea then worked as a teacher and lecturer. In 1973 she left teaching to concentrate full-time on painting. She developed an interest in the coal mining heritage and industrial landscapes of South Wales, as well as painting prisoners, dancers and nightclubs.

At one point, Ganz set up a home and studio in Six Bells in Blaenau Gwent, where she spent a year creating art at the Six Bells Colliery, as well as the local snooker hall and chapel. During the 1980s she spent several days a week underground at 14 coal mines, sketching the miners at work. Her work was exhibited at the Glynn Vivian Art Gallery, Swansea, in 1986, as part of a show called 'Mining in Art' with other well known painters of mining life.

Ganz also spent a year at the Central School of Ballet where she attended every day to paint and draw the dancers.

She held her last major art exhibition in 2010 at the Attic Gallery in Swansea. She was an elected member of the Royal Cambrian Academy.

Fourteen of Ganz's paintings are held in UK public collections, including the National Coal Mining Museum for England, the National Library of Wales and the National Museum of Wales.

She died suddenly on 28 September 2015 aged 79, after struggling with ill health.
