= Dodge Little Red Wagon =

Drag racing truck introduced in 1965

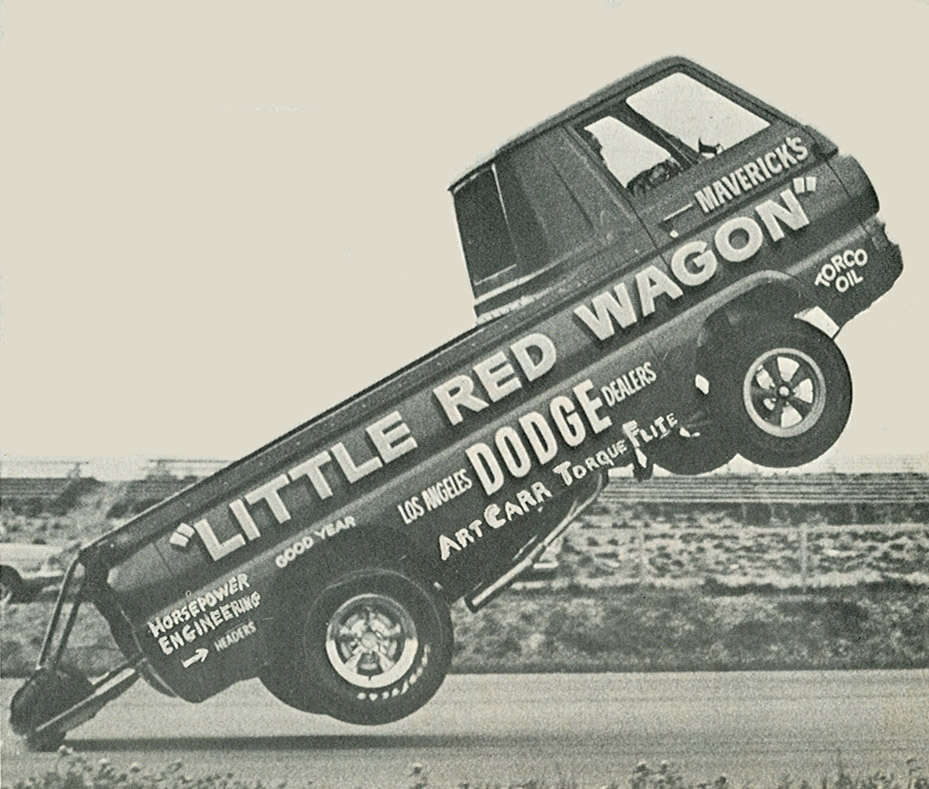
Little Red Wagon

The Dodge Little Red Wagon is an exhibition drag racing truck introduced in 1965. It was the first wheelstanding truck and was the world's fastest truck at that time.

Builders Jim Schaeffer and John Collier performed extensive modifications to the Dodge A100 in order to fit a 426 Hemi engine and TorqueFlite automatic transmission. Since the A100 was a cabover design, Schaeffer and Collier opted to install the drivetrain in the pickup bed, within a welded steel subframe.

Parts deemed unnecessary were removed from the body, among them the heater, dashboard, front bumper, and all body sealer. The Little Red Wagon's first dragstrip run netted a mid-11 second quarter mile at 120 mph (190 km/h).

The vehicle was not originally intended to perform wheelstands; the slight rearward weight bias caused the nose to lift in the air for nearly the entire quarter-mile run. The truck was initially given to Dick Branstner Enterprises and Roger Lindamood to help sort out the ill-handling and unpredictable truck. The team's Dodge Color Me Gone entry had just won the 1964 U.S. Nationals. They enlisted Jay Howell as driver; and the first known photo of it doing a wheelstand has Howell behind the wheel. Chrysler's Director of Marketing, Frank Wylie, arranged for Super Stock Champion Bill "Maverick" Golden to purchase the truck.

Golden turned the A100 pickup into the first exhibition wheelstander. The truck toured extensively throughout the United States and was used in television commercials for Dodge trucks. The Little Red Wagon debuted in the 1965 season opener at Lions Drag Strip in Wilmington, California, in front of 10,000 fans and reporters from major newspapers and automotive publications.

The vehicle suffered wrecks in 1969, 1971, and 1975. After the 1975 wreck, Golden converted a non-operable show truck and campaigned it until he retired in 2003.

Golden entered the Guinness Book of World Records in 1977 with a 4230' (1289m) wheelstand, approximately the length of three quarter-mile dragstrips.

In 2009, the replacement Little Red Wagon from 1975 was sold at RM Auctions Icons of Speed and Style Auction. The vehicle was expected to fetch US$300,000; it was instead the auction's top seller at $550,000.

In 2015, the original Little Red Wagon was sold to stunt driver Mike Mantel, also the current driver of the Hemi Under Glass wheelstander. Mantel has converted a 1965 Dodge A100 into a Little Red Wagon wheelstander to perform and tour with the original crashed truck on display.

It is also the subject of a 1/25 scale model kit from IMC which was later reissued by Lindberg Models.

== Tribute vehicle ==
In 2018, Mark Worman of Graveyard Carz converted a donor chassis to be a tribute car, naming it "Little Dead Wagon". It was exhibited at SEMA 2018.
