= Cyril Zuma =

South African soccer player

Cyril Nzama
Personal information
- Date of birth: 14 February 1985
- Place of birth: Ntuzuma, South Africa
- Date of death: 4 September 2015 (aged 30)
- Place of death: Ntuzuma, South Africa
- Position: Midfielder

Senior career*
Years	Team	Apps	(Gls)
2002–2003	Kaizer Chiefs F.C.		
2003–2004	Maritzburg F.C.		
2004–2005	Maritzburg United F.C.		
2005–2006	Moroka Swallows F.C.		
2006–2007	Pietersburg Pillars		
2007–2008	Mpumalanga Black Aces F.C.		
2010–2011	Nathi Lions F.C.		

International career
2004–2006	South Africa u-23		
- * Club domestic league appearances and goals

Cyril Zuma (14 February 1985 – 4 September 2015) was a South African football midfielder who played for seven clubs in a seven-year career and captained the under-23 national team, then led by Steve Komphela. Zuma died in September 2015, after a car accident the previous month had left him in a coma.
