= Susumu Ito =

Susumu Ito (Japanese: 伊藤 進, July 27, 1919 – September 29, 2015) was an American cell biologist and soldier born in Stockton, California. He was a Nisei, a second-generation Japanese American.

== World War II ==
Ito was in auto mechanic school when he was drafted into the military in 1940, two years before the Japanese attack on Pearl Harbor. He worked as a mechanic, but was eventually assigned to the all Japanese-American 442nd Regimental Combat Team, which became the most decorated unit for its size and length of service in the U.S. Army during World War II. He was an artillery spotter (forward field observer) assigned to C Battery. He was promoted to the rank of second lieutenant on October 19, 1944.

Ito participated in the famous rescue of the "Lost Battalion", the first battalion of the 141st U.S. Infantry Regiment of the 36th Texas Division. The action took place in the Vosges Mountains, in France, in October 1944. Both units were attached to the Seventh U.S. Army. The Lost Battalion had been cut off and surrounded by the Germans. Lt. Ito was attached to I Company of the 442, which effected the rescue. Though the 442nd suffered extremely heavy casualties in the engagement, Ito emerged unscathed. He was attached to I Company, of which only eight members survived this action. Of the rescue, Ito later recalled, "Looking back, it wasn't an easy outing, but having come through it intact, it was an experience that cannot be forgotten or easily duplicated. At the time, I thought that this was more or less a typical battle encounter with a strong enemy and not a special or unique mission. I guess my analysis is not shared by history." The U.S. Army later declared the Rescue of the Lost Battalion to be one of the top ten battles of the U.S. Army in its history.

After the Rescue of the Lost Battalion, the 522nd was sent on a detached assignment with the Seventh U.S. Army as part of the invasion of Southern Germany. The 522nd was a lead unit of the army in the invasion. In late April 1945, elements of the 522nd Field Artillery liberated one of the numerous sub-camps of the Dachau concentration camp near Munich. On March 2, 1945, Ito participated in the liberation of the Dachau death march at Waakirchen, Germany. He and his fellow Nisei soldiers of the 522nd liberated hundreds of Jewish prisoners who had been taken on a death march from the Landsberg-Kaufering outer camps of Dachau. Many of the Jewish survivors credited the Japanese-American artillerymen with saving their lives from the German guards who had begun killing them. Solly Ganor (ソリー・ガノール), a Lithuanian survivor of the death march, wrote extensively of this in his autobiography, Light One Candle.

Lt. Ito took a number of photographs of this important action. These photographs have been published in several books and exhibited in a number of museums, including the U.S. Army Museum at the Presidio of San Francisco, the Los Angeles County Museum of Natural History, the National Museum of American History of the Smithsonian Institution, the Japanese American National Museum, in Los Angeles, California, the Yad Vashem Martyrs' and Heroes' Museum in Jerusalem, Israel, the Simon Wiesenthal Museum of Tolerance, in Los Angeles, California, and at the Hawaii state capitol in Honolulu, Hawaii. Ito was honored with a one-man exhibit, entitled "Before They Were Heroes," which opened in July 2015 at the Japanese American National Museum in Los Angeles. Many of his rare wartime photographs were exhibited. These photographs are now in the collection of that museum.

Ito also took a number of extremely rare photographs during the action of the rescue of the Lost Battalion. He said of this, "I did manage to take a few 35mm photos during those days, but the lighting was poor and my camera's slow f6.3 lens and slow film speed resulted in much underexposed negatives. Furthermore, the constant activity did not lend itself [to] yanking out the camera and shooting photos. In retrospect, I wish I had taken many more. But, that's life."

Lt. Ito was awarded the Bronze Star.

In May 1945, Ito and elements of the 522nd were ordered to capture and occupy Hitler's headquarters in Berchtesgaden. They captured Hitler's infamous Eagle's Nest, along with the 101st Airborne Division.

== Education and professional career ==
After the war, Ito attended university on the G.I. Bill, eventually earning a PhD in biology from Cornell University. Ito's research career was stimulated by a summer in Woods Hole at the Marine Biological Laboratory in 1951, where he met scientists such as Otto Loewi, and particularly Katsuma Dan. He became a professor at the Harvard Medical School Anatomy Department in 1961, where his research centered on ultrastructural (electron microscopic) studies of the gastrointestinal system. In the early 1980s, he and William Silen showed that repair of the mucosal lining of the stomach (“gastric mucosal restitution”) is a far more rapid process than previously thought possible. Thomas D. Pollard began his studies of acto-myosin based cell motility as a student in Ito's lab. Although Ito retired in 1990, the Harvard Medical Emeritus professor was still active in the lab as of 2010.

Dr. Ito was one of the members of the advisory committee of the Go For Broke organization, which opened an exhibit on the Japanese American Soldier of World War II at the Presidio of San Francisco in March 1981.

== Recognition and personal life ==
On October 5, 2010, President Obama signed a bill awarding the Congressional Gold Medal, the highest civilian U.S. medal (along with the Presidential Medal of Freedom), to the members of the 100th Infantry Battalion, the 442nd Regimental Combat Team, the 522nd Field Artillery Battalion and the Japanese American Military Intelligence Service. The medal was presented to the Nisei veterans in a ceremony in the rotunda of the U.S. capitol in November 2011. Dr. Ito was the representative of the 522nd Field Artillery Battalion to symbolically receive the medal from the Speaker of the House of Representatives.

Ito died of natural causes at his home in Wellesley, Massachusetts at the age of 96.
