= Västergarn =

Västergarn Västergarn and Stora Mafrids
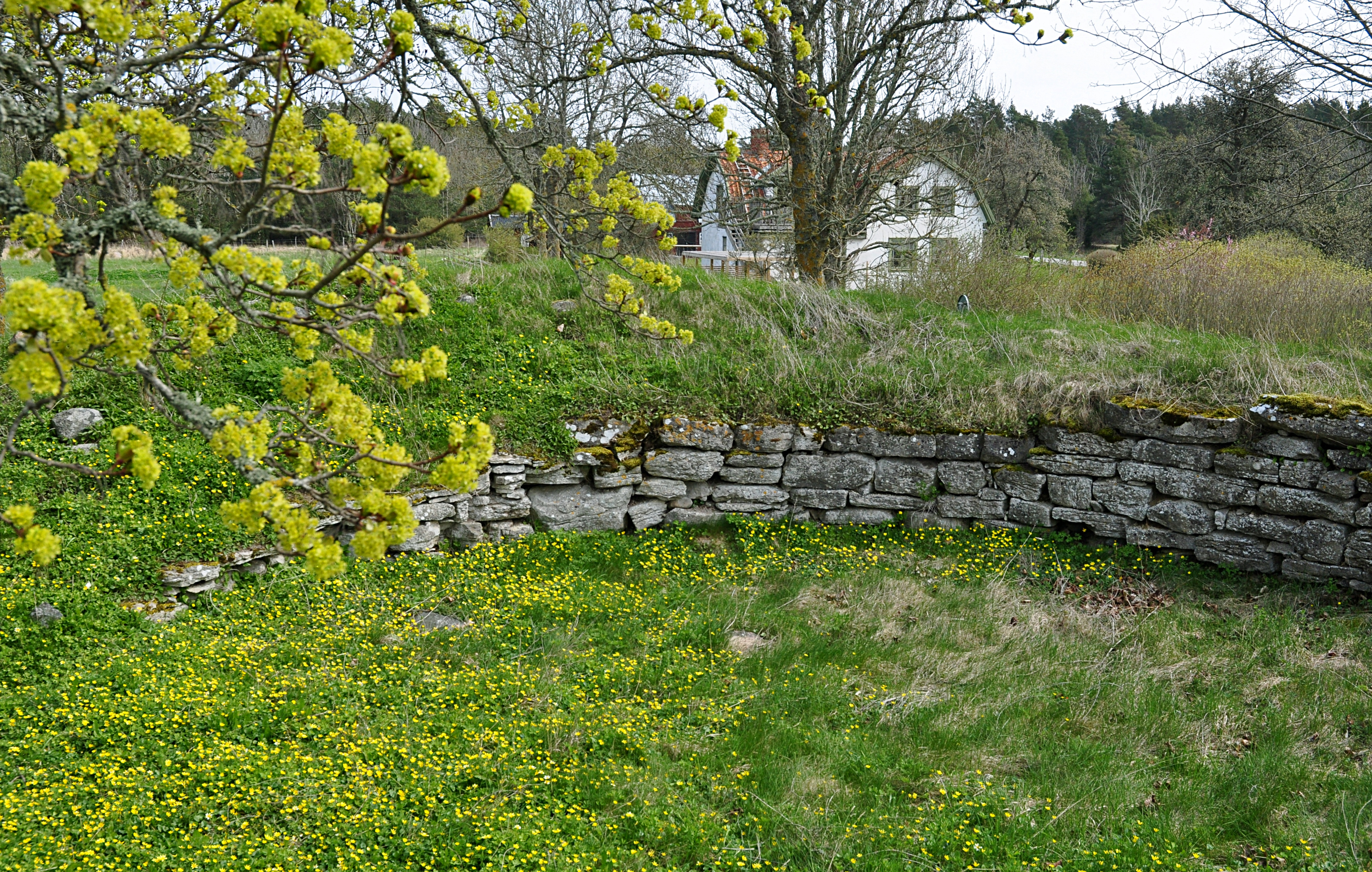
- The old fortress at Västergarn Church

- Location within Gotland
- Coordinates: 57°26′26″N 18°9′3″E
- Country: Sweden
- Province: Gotland
- County: Gotland County
- Municipality: Gotland Municipality

Area
  - Total: 12.20 km^{2} (4.71 sq mi)

Population (2014)
  - Total: 169
- Time zone: UTC+1 (CET)
  - Summer (DST): UTC+2 (CEST)
- Website: www.vastergarn.info

Västergarn is a populated area, a socken (not to be confused with parish), on the Swedish island of Gotland. It comprises the same area as the administrative Västergarn District, established on 1 January 2016.

== Geography ==
Västergarn is the name of the socken as well as the district, sometimes referred to as Västergarn and Stora Mafrids in official documentation after an administrative merger of the two settlements. Västergarn is also the name of the small village surrounding the medieval Västergarn Church, sometimes referred to as Västergarn kyrkby. Västergarn is situated on the central west coast of Gotland. As of 2019, Västergarn Church belongs to Sanda-Västergarn-Mästerby parish in Klinte pastorat, along with the churches in Sanda and Mästerby.

Close by the coast in Västergarn is the former bay, now lake Paviken with its bird reserve. About 2 km (1.2 mi) off the coast is the 50 ha (120 acres) Västergarns utholme island.

== Smaklösa Museum ==
Right by the coast road in Västergarn is one of Gotland's smallest museums (57°26′13.2″N 18°08′41.9″E). Lodged in an old gas station, it is dedicated to the Gotlandic, slightly eccentric music group Smaklösa. The name literally means "Flavourless", but also "Tasteless" or "Tacky". The latter meaning is intended here as indicated by the name of their own record label "Tasteless Records". Since their start in 1973, the band has achieved cult status with dedicated followers both on and off the island. The band is known for its cleverly phrased lyrics, distaste for rehearsals and odd places to perform. They often make fun of other music events or shows and interpret things their own way. In 2006, they received Gotland Municipality's Culture Award.

On 28 July 1978, Swedish astronomer Claes-Ingvar Lagerkvist discovered an asteroid in the asteroid belt, which he named 7545 Smaklösa, after the band. A summer resident on Gotland, Lagerkvist has stated that he is an avid Smaklösa fan.
