= Jakob Stutz =

Swiss writer

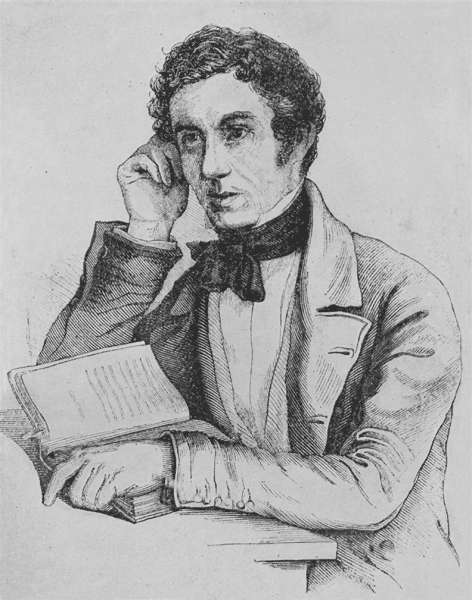
photo of Jakob Stutz

Jakob Stutz (1801–1877) was a Swiss writer.

== Selected works ==
- Gemälde aus dem Volksleben, nach der Natur aufgenommen und getreu dargestellt in gereimten Gesprächen Zürcherischer Mundart. Sechs Bände. Schulthess, Zürich 1831–53
- Briefe und Lieder aus dem Volksleben. St. Gallen 1839
- Vaterländische Schauspiele zur Feier von Volks- und Jugendfesten für Kinder und Erwachsene im Freien aufzuführen. Vom Verfasser der Volks-Gemälde. St. Gallen 1842
- Liese und Salome, die beiden Webermädchen. Eine Erzählung aus dem Volksleben. Meyer und Zeller, Zürich 1847
- Der arme Jakob und die reiche Anna oder „Was Gott zusammengefügt hat, das soll der Mensch nicht scheiden“. Erzählung aus dem Volksleben. J.H. Locher, Zürich (um 1848)
- Sieben mal sieben Jahre aus meinem Leben. Als Beitrag zu näherer Kenntnis des Volkes. Fünf Bände. Zwingli, Pfäffikon 1853–55
  - letzte Neuausgabe: Huber, Frauenfeld 1983; 2. (um ein Vorwort ergänzte) A. 2001
- Der verirrte Sohn oder Die Räuber auf dem Schwarzwald. Schauspiel in vier Aufzügen. Glarus 1861
- Wie Stiefkinder ihrer bösen Stiefmutter los werden. Nach einer wahren Begebenheit. Lustspiel in vier Aufzügen in Zürcher Mundart. Glarus 1865

== Bibliography ==
- Otto Schaufelberger: Endlich geht die Sonne auf. Wunderliche, fröhliche und traurige Jugenderlebnisse des Volksdichters Jakob Stutz nach seiner Selbstbiographie „Sieben mal sieben Jahre aus meinem Leben“. Orell Füssli, Zürich 1962
- Jakob Zollinger: Auf den Spuren von Jakob Stutz. Wetzikon 1977
- Ursula Brunold-Bigler: Jakob Stutz’ Autobiographie „Sieben mal sieben Jahre aus meinem Leben“ als Quelle populärer Lesestoffe im 19. Jahrhundert, in: Schweizerisches Archiv für Volkskunde, 75. Jg. (1979), S. 28–42
- Jakob Stutz (1801–1877). Zürcher Oberländer Volksdichter und Zeitzeuge. Beiträge und Würdigungen, hg. von der Antiquarischen Gesellschaft Pfäffikon. Wetzikon 2001
