= Danilo Jovanovitch =

Australian poet, actor and singer

- Born: 3 September 1919; Cairns, Queensland, Australia
- Died: 17 September 2015 (aged 96)
- Occupations: Poet singer
- Spouse: Judyth Jovanovitch
- Writing career
- Pen name: DJ
- Genres: Australian poetry Rhyming poetry

Danilo Jovanovitch (3 September 1919 – 17 September 2015) was an Australian poet, actor and singer. He appeared in the Australian feature films 40,000 Horsemen, Gone to the Dogs and Ants in His Pants. His published poetry anthologies include Songs of a Bushland Rover and Rhyming Australian Poetry. His poetry has been published in such Australian newspapers as The Land, The Lyndhurst Chronicle, The Mudgee Guardian, The Western Advocate, The Muswellbrook Chronicle, The Tablelands Post, and The Manning River Times. He won a poetry competition in 1981. He was considered by fans of his work as the "living Henry Lawson", Australia's most famous poet.

== Biography and works ==
Jovanovitch was born in 1919 to Croatian parents, George and Ella Jovanovitch in Cairns. When Danilo was four years old his parents moved to Sydney, where they purchased the Silver Grill café in Kings Cross, which soon became a favoured meeting and eating place of soprano singer Gladys Moncrieff and others with artistic and theatrical flair.

Jovanovitch's formal schooling began 2 years later at Newtown Infants School, and then at Mona Vale Infants School when his parents moved to Warriewood where they owned a house and farmland. His father George built and operated the first 46 tomato glass-houses in the region, to supply Sydney markets with tomatoes.

Jovanovitch was an avid reader from an early age, as his mother had taught him to read prior to him starting school. He was inspired by the NSW state government School Magazine – a monthly publication containing Australian poetry by such Australian authors as Henry Lawson, A.B. "Banjo" Paterson, and Dame Mary Gilmore. Jovanovitch's secondary school education was at Manly and Leichhardt Technical schools.

'Dan' Jovanovitch began writing poetry in the mid-1930s. At this time his family bought and managed a café at New Farm, Queensland and it was from here that Jovanovitch set a record in 1937, by cycling 630 miles (solo) from Brisbane to Sydney in 54 hours. He continued cycle racing and regularly trained and competed in road races, as a member of Muswellbrook Cycle Club in the 1960s and 1970s.

In the 1930s Jovanovitch was an acting student at Cinesound Talent School and appeared as an extra in the Australian comedy movies Ants in His Pants and Gone to the Dogs as well as 40,000 Horsemen. Leading Australian actor Alec Kelleway selected Jovanovitch as a featured extra to hold the leash of the 9th greyhound dog in the race scene in the feature film Gone to the Dogs, and Jovanovitch can be seen onscreen in the part on modern DVDs of the film. Ken G. Hall was the film's director, and tutored Danilo in acting, and encouraged him to seriously consider acting as a full-time career.

Jovanovitch chose to have more control over his life than can be offered by the entertainment industry, and bought and ran small businesses till 1939, when he was conscripted into the Australian Armed Services during World War II. He was discharged after 12 months to assist on the family dairy farm at Dooralong. In 1940 Jovanovitch again volunteered for the army, joined the AIF BCOF 14th Works and Parks Engineers as a Rifleman First Class, and was stationed in Kure, near Hiroshima, Japan for 12 months, in February 1946, after the atomic bomb was dropped. During his time in the army, in Japan, Jovanovitch wrote the poems "Homeland Dreams", "Me Beaut Enamel Dishes", and "Australians".

After his discharge from the army, Jovanovitch was becoming recognised for his bass baritone singing talent. Hoyts Theatres in Sydney employed him weekly, with live piano accompaniment to entertain audiences during the movie intervals.

At home in Australia, and overseas, he was lead baritone singer in many stage productions, including the comedy sketch "The Parsons of Puddle" and musicals "The White Horse Inn" and "Happy Days". Well-known singing teacher Fritz Coper selected Jovanovitch as a student during auditions at Sydney Conservatorium of Music. Jovanovitch attended lessons with him for a year, until Coper discontinued lessons due to his own age and ill health.

Over the next decade, Jovanovitch circumnavigated the Australian continent three times on road trips, inspiring him to write such poems as "Monomeeth Ipminger" (about the treatment of Australian aboriginals), the prize-winning "Empty Pockets" (about working class struggles), and "Five Miles From Gundagai", inspired by the Jack Moses poem "Nine Miles From Gundagai".

In the 1960s and 1970s, Jovanovitch owned and ran 'Hunter Valley Cordials Pty Ltd' in Muswellbrook, NSW and continued to write poetry, including "Eureka" about the historic Eureka Stockade battle that occurred at Ballarat, Victoria on Sunday 3 December 1854.

In 1976, Jovanovitch married artist and writer Judyth Kurtz, from the famed wine-making Kurtz family of "Mudgee Wines" who were at the forefront of the 1960s Australian varietal wine-making revival in Eurunderee, NSW. The Kurtz family is referenced in Henry Lawson's poem "The Days When We Went Swimming" (i.e. "farmer Kutz"). At this time Jovanovitch wrote the poems "My Love" and "Eurunderee Flower", published in The Mudgee Guardian newspaper.

In the late 1970s Jovanovitch's poem "Solemn Mountain" was published in The Mudgee Guardian, as was the poem "Tribute to CD `Dud' Mills", the noted Mudgee stockman, poet and author.

In the 1980s Jovanovitch and family moved to Wang Wauk, on the mid-north coast of NSW and ran a hobby farm. While living here Jovanovitch wrote the published poems "Me Bulahdelah Sheila", "Nabiac", and "Those Telstra Blokes".

In 1999 Jovanovitch and wife Judy moved to the central west of NSW, where he continued writing and publishing poetry in various newspapers, including "The Road To Larras Lee" and the poem "Australians", reprinted frequently to commemorate Anzac Day.

During the period 1999–2010, Judy Jovanovitch edited and published an anthology of Jovanovitch's poems, Songs of a Bushland Rover, and Rhyming Australian Poetry. In Rhyming Australian Poetry the works are grouped into genres, including Love Poems, War Poems, Nature/People/Places, Protest Poems, and Humour Poems.
