= Andrzej Szal =

Polish ice hockey player

- Born: 10 January 1942; Nowy Targ, Nazi Germany
- Died: 4 September 2015 (aged 73); Nowy Targ, Poland
- Position: Forward
- Played for: Podhale Nowy Targ; Legia Warsaw
- National team: Poland
- Playing career: 1958–1970

Andrzej Szal (10 January 1942 – 4 September 2015) was a Polish ice hockey player. He played for Podhale Nowy Targ and Legia Warsaw during his career. Szal also played for the Polish national team at the 1964 Winter Olympics and the 1966 World Championships. He died on 4 September 2015.
