= Hanna Mierzejewska =

Polish politician (1950–2015)

Hanna Elżbieta Mierzejewska (21 May 1950 in Warsaw – 1 September 2015 in Brzeziny) was a Polish politician and a member of Law and Justice party. She was elected to Sejm on 25 September 2005, representing a Warsaw constituency.
