= Herschel Silverman =

American poet

Herschel Silverman (April 17, 1926 – September 19, 2015) was an American "Beat" poet. The most important influence on his writing would have been Allen Ginsberg, but he was also connected to the Deep image school of poetry and close to Theodore Enslin. Silverman received the New Jersey Council of Arts Fellowship in Poetry.

== Biography ==
Born in New York, Silverman was raised in California until he was orphaned at age seven, when he was sent to Jersey City to live with his aunt and grandmother. He served in World War II as a cook and in the Korean War in 1952.

Until its closure in 1986, Silverman ran a Bayonne, New Jersey, candy store, called Hersch's Beehive, to provide for his family, while writing hundreds of (published) Beat poems. He also painted and printed poetry chapbooks and pamphlets on the side. In May 2017 the Township of Bayonne named the corner of Avenue A and 29th street Hersch's BeeHive Way commemorating the legendary BeeHive Candy Store.

Silverman continued to read and write new poetry well into his eighties. He was well known in the New York City Beat scene and was a regular at the Bowery Poetry Club and other various Beat venues.

== Personal life ==
Silverman married Laura Frances Rothschild in 1945. They had two children, Elaine and Jack. Laura died on March 6, 1988, aged 60. Silverman died on September 19, 2015, aged 89. They are survived by their children, three grandchildren and six great-grandchildren.

== Works ==
- Krishna Poems. 1970. Repr.: Shivastan Press, 2006
- April 1975 Vietnam Newsreel After "The Times". Repr.: Saul's Press, New York 1999
- Elegies. Arts End Books, 1979
- The Hey-Baby Blues. Beehive Press, Bayonne, NJ 1993
- Nine De Koonings For Marian Courtney. Beehive Press, Bayonne NJ
- Nite Train: Poems of Nostalgia and Frustration. Beehive Press, Bayonne, NJ
- Bookshelf Cowboy. Beehive Press / Arts End Books, Bayonne, NJ 2001
- Lift Off: New and Selected Poems, 1961-2001 Water Row Press, Sudbury, Massachusetts 2002
- A Tokyo Stroll. Yuko Otomo Sisyphus Press, 2002
- Perpendiculars. Beehive Press / Arts End Books, W. Dover, VT 2013
