= Carlo Schäfer =

German crime writer

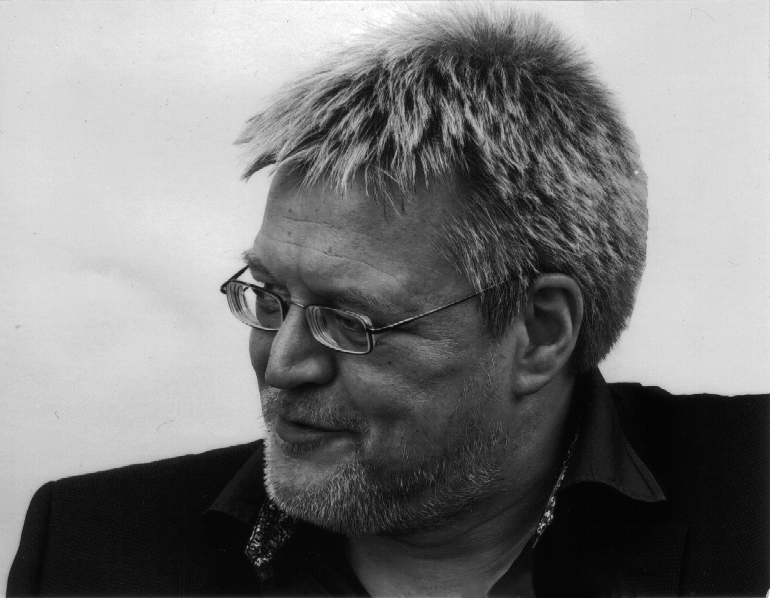
Karl Christoph

Karl Christoph "Carlo" Schäfer (2 January 1964 – 8 September 2015) was a German author of crime novels.

== Life ==
Carlo Schäfer was born in Heidelberg. He grew up as the youngest of three children in Pforzheim in Germany, his father was a Protestant priest there. After leaving school, Schäfer studied German at the University of Heidelberg, but he soon changed to studying at the Heidelberg University of Education (German: Pädagogische Hochschule Heidelberg). After studying, he worked for ten years as a secondary school teacher in Mannheim. Since 2003 Schäfer has been a lecturer at the Heidelberg University of Education (Institute for German language and literature and its didactics).

Schäfer was also a musician and cabaret performer. From 2002 he has been widely known as a crime author.

His protagonist, Detective Theurer, is a brooding, disillusioned man in his mid-fifties. He died in Heidelberg in 2015.

== Bibliography ==
- Im falschen Licht 2002
- Der Keltenkreis 2003
- Das Opferlamm 2004
- Silberrücken 2006
- Schlusslicht 2007 (Der letzte Band der Reihe)

Novels that do not take place in Heidelberg:

- Kinder und Wölfe 2007
- Schattendasein (Jugendkrimi) 2010
- Verdachtsmomente (Zweiter Band der Jugendreihe) 2010
