= Georges de Paris =

Georges de Paris (24 or 28 September 1934 – 13 September 2015) was a French tailor who is often referred to as having been the President of the United States' unofficial tailor or the tailor to the Presidents. Paris fashioned suits for every American President from Lyndon Johnson to Barack Obama.

== Biography ==
De Paris was born in Marseilles, France in 1934. He eventually moved to the United States and lived in Washington, D.C., with a young woman in 1960. After their separation, he found himself homeless, reportedly bathing in the Potomac. He managed to save money to buy a sewing machine and his reputation grew until President Johnson ordered his suits at the suggestion of Otto Passman. He also enjoyed wine and cheese, especially after work at the Washington, D.C., restaurant Old Ebbitt Grill.

De Paris died at the age of 81 in Arlington, Virginia on 13 September 2015 of prostate cancer.
