= Morris E. Fine =

American academic

Morris Eugene Fine (April 12, 1918 – September 30, 2015) was Professor Emeritus of Materials Science and Engineering in Service and Member of the Graduate Faculty at Northwestern University, Evanston, Illinois. A member of Northwestern's faculty for over 60 years starting in 1954, he was co-founder of the world's first department of materials science in that university. He is particularly known for his contributions to the field of physical metallurgy, and his 1964 book "Introduction to Phase Transformations in Condensed Systems" is a classical text in the field. He was born in Jamestown, North Dakota and died in 2015 at the age of 97. His funeral was held at Temple Emanuel Sinai in Worcester, Massachusetts on October 7, 2015.
