= Peter Barrable =

South African cricketer (1943–2015)

Personal information
- Born: 16 June 1943; Benoni, Transvaal, South Africa
- Died: 17 September 2015 (aged 72); Belfast, Mpumalanga, South Africa
- Source: Cricinfo, 23 March 2016

Peter Barrable (16 June 1943 – 17 September 2015) was a South African cricketer. He played sixteen first-class matches for Northerns between 1964 and 1975.
