= Eugenio Mayer =

Italian cross-country skier

Personal information
- Nationality: Italian
- Born: 29 December 1939; Zoldo Alto, Italy
- Died: 12 September 2015 (aged 75); Belluno, Italy

Sport
- Sport: Cross-country skiing

Eugenio Mayer (29 December 1939 – 19 September 2015) was an Italian cross-country skier. He competed in the men's 50 kilometre event at the 1964 Winter Olympics.
