= Peeter Luksep =

Swedish politician (1955–2015)

Peeter Luksep (29 January 1955 – 8 September 2015) was a Swedish politician of Estonian descent, most notable for being a member of the Swedish Parliament for the Moderate Party from 1991 to 1994.

Luksep was born in Hammarby and began his studies at the Stockholm School of Economics in 1974. He earned a business degree in 1981 and received the title of Master of Business Administration.

He was an MP for the Moderate Party between 1991 and 1994 and deputy director at the V&S Group. He was also one of the elected officials abroad to support the Congress of Estonia. He founded the Måndagsrörelsen, together with Gunnar Hökmark, Håkan Holmberg and Andres Küng. He died in Stockholm in 2015.

== Awards ==
- The Order for Merit to Lithuania (Lithuanian: Ordinas Už nuopelnus Lietuvai)
