= Palm pedal =

A palm pedal is a mechanical device that consists of levers attached to the strings of a guitar or other stringed instrument for the purpose of pulling the strings up in pitch to a preset half-step or whole-step.

The palm pedal was invented by Boomer Castleman, an American guitarist and singer-songwriter, who designed the prototype in 1968. Bigsby was the manufacturer of this product in the early 1970s. Pro Palm Pedals, a company in Nashville, manufactured palm pedals from 2009 to 2016, when owner Kenny Clark, closed the business, to pursue his musical career.

I saw Dean Porter the true inventor of the palm pedal with a guitar with a homemade palm pedal he made from a teaspoon. Many years I worked in a home town studio where he was from (Portsmouth Ohio) he and I recorded a recitation for Dean Stern host of a local West Virginian Tv Country show.
