= Toshiya Sukegawa =

Japanese composer (1930–2015)

Toshiya Sukegawa (Japanese: 助川 敏弥, romanized: Sukegawa Toshiya; 15 July 1930 – 26 September 2015) was a Japanese composer, music critic and magazine editor.

== Biography ==
Born in Sapporo, Sukegawa entered the composition department of Tokyo University of the Arts in 1952, where he studied with Tomojirō Ikenouchi, graduating in 1957. While still a student he won first prize and a special prize in the composition division of the Music Competition of Japan in 1954 with his Passacaglia for Orchestra.

In 1958, he joined Yagi No Kai (the Goat Group), a group of Japanese composers including Hikaru Hayashi, Michio Mamiya, and Yuzō Toyama. The Goat Group sought to create distinctively Japanese music assimilating Japanese folksongs and traditional music into the western art music in which they had trained.

Alongside his concert works Sukegawa wrote extensively for broadcasting, particularly for NHK. He received an Encouragement Prize at the Ministry of Education Art Festival in 1960 for his Partita for Orchestra and an Excellence Prize from the Agency for Cultural Affairs Art Festival in 1971; in 1973 the NHK entry Children and Words, which he composed, won the Prix Italia. He later taught at the University of Tokyo and served as representative director of the Japan Music and Dance Conference and as editor-in-chief of its journal Ongaku no Sekai ("The World of Music").

Sukegawa died of lung cancer in Tokyo on 26 September 2015, at the age of 85.

== Works ==
Sukegawa composed music for most western art music instruments, including orchestra, piano, and marimba, as well as electroacoustic music. His early output consists largely of orchestral and chamber works, beginning with the Passacaglia for Orchestra (1954); after entering the world of broadcast music he broadened his output to include choral works and pieces for traditional Japanese instruments, and from the 1970s onwards concentrated particularly on piano music. His Projection for Marimba and Four Instruments was premiered by the famed marimba player Keiko Abe in 1969.

One of his best-known works internationally is The Eternal Morning (おわりのない朝), Op. 68, composed in 1983 on a commission from NHK's Hiroshima station. The piece combines a piano that survived the atomic bombing of Hiroshima — a so-called hibaku piano — with chamber orchestra, electronic sound and location recordings; it was recorded by the Hiroshima Symphony Orchestra under Hideomi Kuroiwa with Genichiro Murakami as piano soloist. It was issued in 1983 on the composer's own Flora label, paired with the purely electronic Chant du vent, Op. 62 (1980), and the album was reissued on CD in 2023. The work was later broadcast abroad, and interest in it has been renewed by the wider international rediscovery of Japanese electronic and environmental music.

In the 1980s and 1990s, Sukegawa became more interested in electronic and ambient music, producing six albums labeled "Bioçic Music." He also wrote installed environmental music for buildings including the Kajima head office and its technical research institute, and for the Ashigara service area of the Tōmei Expressway. After 2000 he returned to writing for live performers, producing numerous works for solo piano, violin and chamber ensembles, and continued composing into his eighties.

Selected works include:

- Passacaglia for orchestra (1954)
- Partita for orchestra (1960)
- Legende for orchestra (1965)
- Three Landscapes for seventeen-string koto and strings (1969)
- Five Pieces after Paul Klee (1970), written for Keiko Abe and Michiko Takahashi
- Little Four Seasons, 26 easy pieces for piano (1971)
- White World, suite for mixed chorus (1971)
- Tapestry for piano (1972)
- Three Chapters for solo seventeen-string koto (1974)
- Sansuizu (Landscape) for piano (1978)
- The Eternal Morning, Op. 68, for atomic-bombed piano, chamber orchestra and electronic sound (1983)
- Chant du vent, Op. 62, for tape (1980)
- Bioçic Music, six albums of environmental music (1992)
- For Small Lives for piano (2000)
- 24 Preludes for piano (2012–2015, published posthumously in 2019)
