= Bruno Stutz =

Bruno Stutz

Bruno Stutz (21 August 1938 – 11 September 2015) was a Swiss clown known for his performances with the Chickys, an act established by his cousin Eugen Altenburger.
