= Antonio Dalmonte =

Italian footballer (1919-2015)

Personal information
- Date of birth: 3 April 1919
- Place of birth: Castrocaro Terme e Terra del Sole, Italy
- Date of death: 5 September 2015 (aged 96)
- Position: Defender

Senior career*
Years	Team	Apps	(Gls)
1940–1942	Forlimpopoli		
1942–1943	Ravenna	13	(0)
1945–1946	Forlì	18	(0)
1946–1947	Cesena	39	(0)
1947–1948	Juventus	16	(0)
1948–1952	Atalanta	116	(0)
1952–1953	Reggiana	21	(0)
1953–1954	Aosta	21	(1)
1954–1956	Voghera	23	(0)
Total		267	(1)
- * Club domestic league appearances and goals

Antonio Dalmonte (3 April 1919 – 5 September 2015) was an Italian professional football player.
