= Herbert Mayr =

Italian politician (1943–2015)

Deputy mayor of Bolzano
- In office 1985–1995
- Preceded by: Hanns Egger
- Succeeded by: Elmar Pichler Rolle

Personal details
- Born: 27 April 1943 Bolzano, Italy
- Died: 6 September 2015 (aged 72)
- Party: South Tyrolean People's Party

Herbert Mayr (27 April 1943 – 6 September 2015) was an Italian politician from the autonomous German province of South Tyrol in Italy.

Mayr studied sport in Bologna during the mid-1960s, at the end of the 1970s was a professor at the University of Innsbruck and from 1987 until 1994 was the chairman of the sports club SSV Bozen.

Mayr was voted into the Bolzano city council on three occasions as a member of the South Tyrolean People's Party and served as the city's deputy mayor between 1985 and 1995. After being diagnosed with Parkinson's disease, Mayr is now the president of the Südtiroler Parkinson-Gesellschaft.
