= Fred Ohr =

American WWII flying ace (1919-2015)

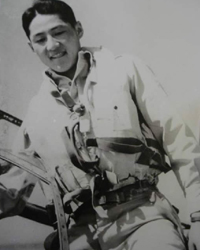
- Captain Fred Ohr in 1943
- Born: July 15, 1919; Boise Basin, Idaho, United States
- Died: September 6, 2015 (aged 96)
- Military career
- Allegiance: United States
- Branch: United States Army Air Corps
- Service years: 1938–1944
- Rank: Major
- Unit: 116th Cavalry Regiment
- Commands: 2d Fighter Squadron
- Conflicts: World War II: Mediterranean Theater of Operations
- Awards: Silver Star (2); Distinguished Flying Cross (2); Bronze Star Medal; Air Medal (19)
- Other work: Dentist

Fred F. Ohr (July 15, 1919 – September 6, 2015) was an American World War II flying ace, credited with the destruction of six aircraft in the air and 17 on the ground.

Ohr was born on July 15, 1919, in Oregon to Korean immigrants Wanda and Wan Ju, and grew up on a farm in the Boise, Idaho, basin. Out of high school he joined the military in 1938 but was not on the path to becoming a pilot until inadvertently participating in a pilot examination in 1940.

In fall 1942 he deployed with the 68th Material Service Squadron to Britain. He served as a ground crew member in Tunisia, seeing action as his airbase was overrun. Afterwards, Ohr flew until November 1944 with the 2nd Fighter Squadron, 52nd Fighter Group, ending his tour as the squadron's commanding officer. He received numerous decorations including the Silver Star with one Oak Leaf Cluster, the Distinguished Flying Cross with one Oak Leaf Cluster, the Bronze Star Medal and the Air Medal with 18 Oak Leaf Clusters. He received a citation for his escort action during Operation Tidal Wave in 1943, when he and his unit intercepted three enemy fighters preparing to attack Allied bombers over a target area. He shot down one aircraft during the mission.

After the war, Ohr became a dental surgeon in Chicago. He practiced dentistry until his retirement in 2005.
