= Bill Golden =

American racing driver

- Born: December 31, 1933; Shawnee Township, Illinois, US
- Died: September 14, 2015 (aged 81)
- Occupation: Drag racer
- Known for: Driver of the Little Red Wagon A/FX wheelstander

Billy Lawrence Golden (December 31, 1933 – September 14, 2015), nicknamed "Maverick", was an American drag racer. He is probably best known for driving the Little Red Wagon A/FX wheelstander pickup exhibition racer.

== History ==
Born in Shawnee Township, Illinois, Golden joined the US Marines and first became interested in drag racing while at Camp Pendleton.

Golden was given his "Maverick" nickname in the late 1950s by an announcer at a Southern California dragstrip, because he chose to drive an unconventional 361 cu in (5,920 cc)-powered Dodge Custom Royal. He started racing in AHRA Super Stock, driving Dodges for several years. He was one of the first drivers in AHRA S/S to successfully run an automatic transmission. In 1960, Chrysler offered to provide him parts, when he was driving a Dodge Phoenix, powered by a 330 hp (250 kW) 330 cu in (5.4 L) with twin Carter carburetors and cross-ram intake manifold; the car was capable of quarter-mile times of 13.7 seconds.

By 1962, Golden was a factory driver, driving an S/SA Dodge. At the 1962 AHRA Winternationals, driving his bright yellow hemi "Taxi Cab" Dodge 330, he scored a "stunning" victory over "Dyno Don" Nicholson's 409 cu in (6,700 cc) factory Chevrolet at Fontana Drag City, to take the Stock Eliminator title, Chrysler's only Nationals win for 1962.

In 1963, Golden worked with Jim Nelson of Dragmasters to improve the car, and won seven Super Stock races out of eight events, taking the Midwest Championship.

At the end of the 1964 season, Chrysler proposed Golden drive the Little Red Wagon A/FX pickup. which became drag racing's first wheelstanding truck.

Little Red Wagon's first outing, at the AHRA Grand American event at Lions Drag Strip, was an 11 second pass at 120 mph (190 km/h). The crowd's very enthusiastic reaction prompted Golden to turn the A/FX truck into a wheelstanding exhibition racer, which he developed a steering mechanism for himself, relying on experience from his day job at Douglas Aircraft Corporation. The wheelstander was wrecked in 1969, 1971, and 1975; the third crash was nearly fatal to Golden.

Golden retired in 2003. He died on September 14, 2015.
