= Ian Payne (South African cricketer) =

South African cricketer (1949–2015)

Personal information
- Born: 4 October 1949; Cape Town, South Africa
- Died: 13 September 2015 (aged 65); Cape Town, South Africa
- Source: Cricinfo, 23 March 2016

Ian Payne (4 October 1949 – 13 September 2015) was a South African cricketer. He played nineteen first-class matches for Western Province between 1968–1978.
