= List of Free State representative cricketers =

This is a partial list of cricketers who have played first-class, List A cricket, or Twenty20 cricket for Orange Free State and Free State in South Africa. The team was renamed ahead of the 1995–96 season following the renaming of Orange Free State province as Free State in 1994.

Orange Free State were scheduled to join the Currie Cup in 1898–99 before the tournament was cancelled due to the outbreak of the Second Boer War. (Note: The first domestic first-class matches in South Africa were played during the 1889–90 season, establishing the Currie Cup. Two Test matches played the previous season between South Africa and a touring English team are considered the first matches played in South Africa to have first-class status.) When the tournament resumed in 1902–03 the province missed the competition, before making its first-class debut the following season, losing by an innings and 327 runs to Transvaal. From that date the matches it played in the competition are considered first-class. The Orange Free State B team joined the Currie Cup B section in 1989–90, and matches involving the B team are considered first-class in the competition. Following the renaming of the team as Free State, the B section competition continued, with Free State B taking part in 1995–96.

Orange Free State first played List A cricket in 1970–71, the first season of provincial List A cricket in South Africa. (Note: The 1969–70 Gillette Cup competition had taken place the previous season, but teams did not use their provincial names. The team that represented Orange Free State was organised by Raymond van der Poll and known as R van der Poll's XI. It played one match. All 11 players also played matches for Orange Free State so, by default, appear on this list.) Free State first played domestic Twenty20 cricket in the first season of the CSA Provincial T20 in 2011–12.

This list includes the players who played first-class and List A cricket for Orange Free State and Orange Free State B between 1903–04 and 1994–95, and those who played first-class, List A, and Twenty20 cricket for Free State and Free State B from 1995–96 to the present day. It does not include players who appeared only for franchise team Knights which was operated by the Free State and Griqualand West Cricket Unions between 2003–04 and 2020–21. (Note: The Knights franchise was known as Eagles from 2003–04 and 2009–10. The players who played for the franchise team are listed at List of Knights cricketers.)

As of 14 July 2025

== A ==
- Joseph Abell
- Jimmy Adams
- Sergio Arends
- Rayno Arendse
- John Arenhold
- Geoff Arnold
- Mickey Arthur
- Richard Ashman

== B ==
- Ryan Bailey
- John Barclay
- Alan Barr
- Karl Bauermeister
- Harold Baumgartner
- Farhaan Behardien
- Percy Bell
- Jonathan Beukes
- Colin Bland
- Alan Blenkinsop
- Nicky Boje
- Loots Bosman
- Patrick Botha
- Chris Broad
- Gerard Brophy
- Stephen Bruce
- Ian Brune
- Mbulelo Budaza
- Edward Budgen
- Sydney Burke
- Mike Buss

== C ==
- Frederick Campling
- Mike Cann
- Peter Carlstein
- Bob Catterall
- Wally Chalmers
- Sylvester Clarke
- Shunter Coen
- Gerald Coetzee
- Maurice Cole
- Cecil Colman
- Mick Commaille
- Ewie Cronje
- Frans Cronje
- Hansie Cronje
- Ralph Cullinan

== D ==
- Desmond Daniel
- Riel de Kock
- Desmond de Koker
- Andre de Lange
- Con de Lange
- Marchant de Lange
- Simon Dennis
- CJ de Villiers
- Dirkie de Villiers
- John de Villiers
- Louis de Villiers
- Boeta Dippenaar
- Allan Donald
- Conan Doyle
- Jonathan Draai
- Janko Dreyer
- Corné Dry
- Keith Dudgeon
- Petrus du Plessis
- Leus du Plooy
- Dillon du Preez

== E ==
- Arthur Edwards
- Dean Elgar
- Michael Erlank
- Anthony Evans

== F ==
- Harold Fawcus
- Charles Fichardt
- Ivor Foulkes
- John Fox
- Tiny Francis
- Thomas Fraser
- Ken Funston

== G ==
- Andrew Gait
- Stuart Gardiner
- Keith Gibbs
- Martyn Gidley
- Robert Gouldie
- Andries Gous
- Peter Graves
- Allan Green

== H ==
- Francois Haasbroek
- Peter Hacker
- Rupert Hanley
- Stephen Hanson
- Neil Hartley
- Benjamin Hector
- Peter Heine
- David Hemp
- James Henderson
- Omar Henry
- Pelham Henwood
- Augustus Hewitt-Fox
- Alan Hill
- Peter Hobson
- Matthew Hoggard
- Vanburn Holder
- Glenn Hughes
- Geoff Humpage

== I ==
- Colin Ingram
- John Isaac

== J ==
- Davy Jacobs
- Duan Jansen
- Arthur Jewell
- John Jewell

== K ==
- Alvin Kallicharran
- Matthew Kleinveldt
- Lloyd Koch
- Patrick Kruger
- John Kumleben

== L ==
- Allan Lamb
- Donald Lee
- Eddie Leie
- Darryl le Roux
- Raymond le Roux
- James Liddle
- Gerhardus Liebenberg
- Neville Lindsay
- Andy Lloyd
- Jeremy Lloyds

== M ==
- Mike Macaulay
- Gregory Mahlokwana
- Wandile Makwetu
- Colin Maritz
- Thabo Masheshemane
- Siphamandla Mavanda
- Loyiso Mdashe
- Tancred Melis
- Ashley Metcalfe
- Hamish Miller
- Thandolwethu Mnyaka
- Karabo Mogotsi
- Pheko Moletsane
- Peter Moores (cricketer)
- Hilton Moreeng
- Raymond Morkel
- Mangaliso Mosehle
- Bokang Mosena
- Alfred Mothoa
- Victor Mpitsang
- Helgard Müller
- Campbell Munro

== N ==
- Tshepo Ntuli

== O ==
- Duanne Olivier
- Hanco Olivier
- Bradley Osborne

== P ==
- Christiaan Papenfus
- Gordon Parsons
- Dennis Piers
- Bradley Player
- Andrew Pollock
- Laurie Potter
- Hugh Poyntz
- Dewald Pretorius
- Migael Pretorius
- Roger Prideaux
- Meyrick Pringle
- Mike Procter
- Henry Promnitz

== Q ==
- Frederick Quested
- Stan Quin

== R ==
- Wayne Radford
- Andrew Rasemene
- Jack Richards
- Alfred Richardson
- Clive Richardson
- Dilivio Ridgaard
- Douglas Riemer
- Norman Riley
- Warne Rippon
- Edward Roberts
- Neil Rosendorff
- Diego Rosier
- Rilee Rossouw

== S ==
- Kenneth Saggers
- Keith Sansom
- Etienne Schmidt
- Des Schonegevel
- Rudi Second
- Bennett Sekonyela
- Mike Selvey
- Letlotlo Sesele
- Peter Shuman
- Malusi Siboto
- Arnie Sidebottom
- Willem Smit
- David Smith
- Jacques Snyman
- Dylan Stanley
- Franklyn Stephenson
- Rudi Steyn
- Alastair Storie
- Andy Stovold
- Steve Strydom
- William Strydom
- Shane Summers
- Beyers Swanepoel
- Frederick Swarbrook

== T ==
- Roger Telemachus
- Romano Terblanche
- Craig Thyssen
- Fred Titmus
- Thandi Tshabalala
- Len Tuckett
- Lindsay Tuckett

== U ==
- Patrick Uys

== V ==
- Pite van Biljon
- Cassie van der Merwe
- Willem van der Merwe
- Johan van der Wath
- Johan van Dyk
- Marno van Greuning
- Nealan van Heerden
- Shadley van Schalkwyk
- Raynard van Tonder
- Jandre van Wyk
- Morné van Wyk
- Corrie van Zyl
- Cornelis Vels
- Kosie Venter
- Gavin Victor
- Ken Viljoen
- Philip Visser
- Andre Volsteedt
- Chrisjan Vorster
- Gino Vries

== W ==
- Leslie Wenzler
- Andrew Wessels
- Kepler Wessels
- Sean Whitehead
- Louis Wilkinson
- Huntsman Williams
- Richard Worsley
- Harold Wright
- Francis Wyatt

== Z ==
- Lwandiswa Zuma
