= De Villiers =

de Villiers is a common French and Afrikaans surname.

de Villiers or Devilliers may refer to:

- De Villiers (playwright) (c. 1600–1681), French playwright and actor
- AB de Villiers, South African international cricketer
- Anna de Villiers (1900–1979), Afrikaans South African writer, lexicographer, and educator
- De Villiers Graaff, South African politician
- CJ de Villiers, South African cricketer
- Dirkie de Villiers (1889–1958), South African rugby union player and cricketer
- Fanie de Villiers, South African cricketer
- Gerard de Villiers, French writer of spy stories
- Giniel de Villiers, South African racing driver
- HO de Villiers, South African rugby union player
- Jackie de Villiers (1894–1960), South African judge
- Jacob de Villiers (1868–1932), judge and Chief Justice of South Africa
- Jay Devilliers (born 1994), A French professional pickleball player
- Jean de Villiers, South African international rugby union player
- Jan-Izak de Villiers, Namibian cricket and hockey international player
- Johan Zulch de Villiers (1845–1910), South African politician
- John de Villiers (1842–1914), Cape lawyer, judge and Chief Justice of South Africa
- Izak Louis de Villiers, South African theologian and author
- Juan de Villiers, South African cricketer
- Karlien de Villiers (born 1975), South African artist
- Louis de Villiers (1908–1970), South African cricketer
- Louis Coulon de Villiers (1710–1757), French military officer
- M.L. de Villiers (1885–1977), South African clergyman and composer
- Nannie de Villiers, South African tennis player
- Peggy de Villiers (born 1993), South African deaf swimmer
- Peter de Villiers, South African rugby union coach named in 2008 as the head coach of the country's national team, the Springboks
- Philippe de Villiers, French politician
- Pieter de Villiers, South African hurdler
- Pieter de Villiers, South African-born French international rugby union player
- Ryan de Villiers (born 1992), South African actor

== See also ==
- Villiers (disambiguation)
