= Wenzler =

Wenzler is a surname. It may refer to:

- Franz Wenzler (1893–1942), German film director
- Leslie Wenzler (born 5 July 1962), South African former first-class cricketer
- Sarah Wilhelmina Wenzler (active 1861–1872) American painter of still-lifes
