= Strydom =

Strydom, or Strijdom, is an Afrikaans surname. Notable people with the surname include:

- Amanda Strydom (born 1956), South African singer and songwriter
- Barend Strydom (born 1965), South African mass murderer who was sentenced to death
- Gary Strydom (born 1960), American IFBB professional bodybuilder
- Gerhard Strydom (born 1979), South African cricketer for South Western Districts
- Gregory Strydom (born 1984), Zimbabwean cricketer
- Hans Strydom (actor) (born 1947), South African actor
- Hannes Strydom (born July 1965), former South African rugby union player
- Hanri Strydom (born 1980), cricketer who played for South Africa national women's cricket team
- J. G. Strijdom (1893–1958), prime minister of South Africa
- Justin Strydom (born 1973), South African actor, writer and producer
- Maria Strydom (mountain climber who died in 2016 climbing Mt Everest)
- Ockie Strydom (born 1985), South African professional golfer
- Pieter Strydom (born 1969), South African cricketer
- Popeye Strydom (1932–2001), South African rugby union player
- Reinhardt Strydom (born 1977), South African-born Irish cricketer
- Steve Strydom (1938–2005), South African cricketer and rugby union referee
- Vickus Strijdom, South African director
- William Strydom (1942–1995), South African first-class cricketer
- Lee Strydom (born 1972), South African podcaster(Strange and Mysterious world), Mystic, Artist, Ufologist and Author, Published a Book "The Shift" a metaphysical awakening.
