= Arendse =

Arendse is a surname. Notable people with the surname include:

- Andre Arendse (born 1967), South African soccer player
- Jonathan Arendse, South African politician
- Kurt-Lee Arendse (born 1996), South African rugby player
- Nolan Arendse (born 1968), South African darts player
- Rayno Arendse (born 1978), South African cricketer
- Roger Arendse (born 1993), South African cricketer
- Tyren Arendse (born 1980), South African soccer player
- Wayne Arendse (born 1984), South African soccer player
