= Mbombela Local Municipality elections =

The Mbombela Local Municipality is a Local Municipality in Mpumalanga, South Africa. It was formed in 2016 after the merger of the Umjindi Local Municipality and the former Mbombela municipality. The council consists of ninety members elected by mixed-member proportional representation. Forty-five councillors are elected by first-past-the-post voting in forty-five wards, while the remaining twenty are chosen from party lists so that the total number of party representatives is proportional to the number of votes received. In the election of 1 November 2021 the African National Congress (ANC) won a majority of fifty-nine seats.

== Results ==
The following table shows the composition of the council after past elections.

Event	ANC	DA	EFF	FF+	Other	Total
2016 election	69	13	6	1	1	90
2021 election	59	12	14	3	2	90

== August 2016 election ==
The following table shows the results of the 2016 election.

Party	Ward			List			Total seats
Party	Votes	%	Seats	Votes	%	Seats	Total seats
African National Congress	142,226	76.14	41	142,127	76.27	28	69
Democratic Alliance	26,008	13.92	4	25,913	13.91	9	13
Economic Freedom Fighters	12,414	6.65	0	12,807	6.87	6	6
Residence Association of South Africa	2,132	1.14	0	2,177	1.17	1	1
Freedom Front Plus	1,593	0.85	0	1,442	0.77	1	1
African Christian Democratic Party	688	0.37	0	719	0.39	0	0
Independent candidates	1,093	0.59	0				0
African People's Convention	318	0.17	0	754	0.40	0	0
Pan Africanist Congress of Azania	312	0.17	0	250	0.13	0	0
Inkatha Freedom Party				163	0.09	0	0
Total	186,784	100.00	45	186,352	100.00	45	90
Valid votes	186,784	98.85		186,352	98.83		
Invalid/blank votes	2,180	1.15		2,207	1.17		
Total votes	188,964	100.00		188,559	100.00		
Registered voters/turnout	316,905	59.63		316,905	59.50		

== November 2021 election ==
The following table shows the results of the 2021 election.

Party	Ward			List			Total seats
Party	Votes	%	Seats	Votes	%	Seats	Total seats
African National Congress	82,923	64.50	41	84,658	65.92	18	59
Economic Freedom Fighters	18,780	14.61	0	18,948	14.76	14	14
Democratic Alliance	17,386	13.52	4	17,406	13.55	8	12
Freedom Front Plus	4,221	3.28	0	4,137	3.22	3	3
Independent candidates	2,596	2.02	0				0
African Christian Democratic Party	1,101	0.86	0	1,141	0.89	1	1
African Transformation Movement	947	0.74	0	1,001	0.78	1	1
African People's Convention	455	0.35	0	336	0.26	0	0
United Independent Movement	92	0.07	0	232	0.18	0	0
Inkatha Freedom Party	33	0.03	0	262	0.20	0	0
Pan Africanist Congress of Azania	27	0.02	0	218	0.17	0	0
Spectrum National Party	2	0.00	0	78	0.06	0	0
Total	128,563	100.00	45	128,417	100.00	45	90
Valid votes	128,563	98.73		128,417	98.58		
Invalid/blank votes	1,655	1.27		1,844	1.42		
Total votes	130,218	100.00		130,261	100.00		
Registered voters/turnout	318,116	40.93		318,116	40.95		
