= Anthony Evans =

Anthony or Antony Evans may refer to:

- Walton Evans (Anthony Walton White Evans, 1817–1886), American civil engineer
- Sir Anthony Evans (judge) (1934–2026), judge of the Court of Appeal of England and Wales
- Anthony Evans (cricketer) (1942–2016), South African cricketer
- Anthony G. Evans (1942–2009), British mechanical engineer
- Anthony Evans (skier) (born 1969), Australian cross country skier
- Anthony Evans (basketball) (born 1970), American basketball coach
- Anthony Evans (singer) (born 1978), American Christian singer-songwriter
- Antony Evans (footballer) (born 1998), English footballer
- Anthony Evans III (born 2005), American football player

== See also ==
- Tony Evans (disambiguation)
