= Gouldie =

Gouldie is a surname. Notable people with the surname include:

- Alexandra Gouldie (born 1991), American volleyball player
- Archie Gouldie (1936–2016), Canadian professional wrestler
- Robert Gouldie (1905–1968), South African cricketer

== See also ==
- Goldie (surname)
