= Haasbroek =

Haasbroek is a surname. Notable people with the surname include:

- Francois Haasbroek (born 1987), South African cricketer who has played for North West and Free State
- Ruan Haasbroek (born 1997), South African cricketer who has played for North West
- Pieter Haasbroek, South African cricketer who has played for Limpopo
