= SS Transylvania (1914) =

Ship

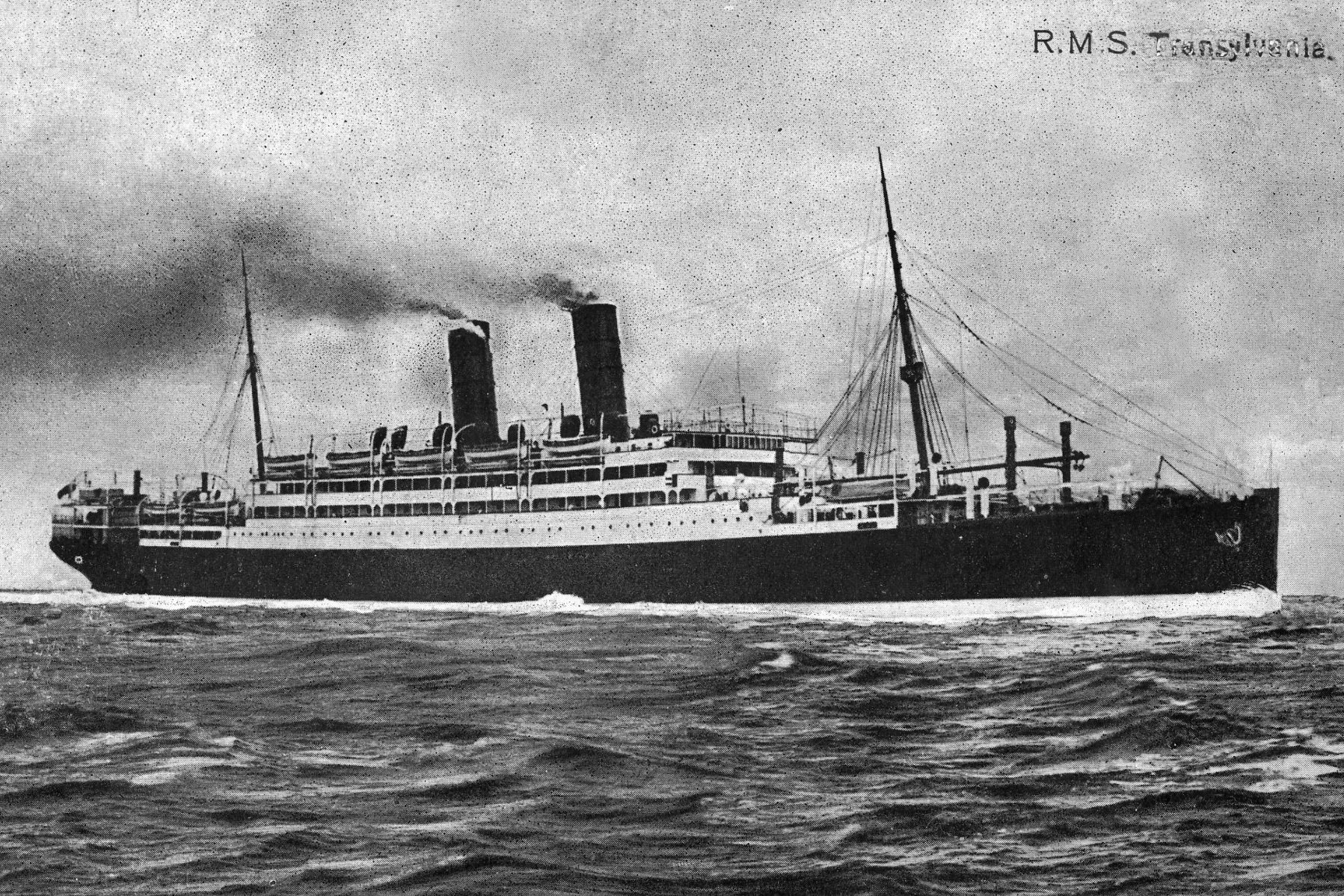
- SS Transylvania

History

United Kingdom
- Name: Transylvania
- Owner: Cunard Steam-Ship Co., Liverpool; 1915 Anchor Line (Henderson Brothers) Ltd.
- Builder: Scotts, Greenock & Grangemouth Dockyard Co. Ltd., Greenock
- Launched: 23 May 1914
- Acquired: May 1915
- Fate: Sunk, 4 May 1917

General characteristics
- Type: Ocean liner
- Tonnage: 14,348 GRT
- Length: 548.3 ft (167.1 m)
- Beam: 66.6 ft (20.3 m)
- Draught: 42 ft (13 m)
- Installed power: 6 × Scotch boilers; 2 × Parsons steam turbines
- Propulsion: Twin screw propellers
- Speed: 17.5 knots (32.4 km/h; 20.1 mph)
- Capacity: 1,379 passengers, as built; 3,060, as troopship

SS Transylvania was a British passenger liner of the Anchor Line, a subsidiary of the Cunard Line and a sister ship to SS Tuscania. She was torpedoed and sunk on 4 May 1917 by the German U-boat SM U-63 at 44°15′N 8°30′E while carrying Allied troops to Egypt and sank with a loss of 412 lives.

== History ==
=== Career ===
Completed just after the outbreak of World War I, The 14,348-gross register ton (GRT) Transylvania was built in 1914 at the Scotts Shipbuilding and Engineering Company shipyard in the Scottish city of Greenock. The owner was the Anchor Line, which had been part of the Cunard Line since 1911. The 167.11-metre (548 ft 3 in) long steamer was powered by two Parsons turbines and six Scotch steam boilers, which acted on two propellers and enabled a speed of 17.5 knots (32.4 km/h; 20.1 mph). She was taken over for service as a troopship from May 1915 the Admiralty fixed her capacity at 200 officers and 2,860 men, plus crew compared to the 1,379 passengers she was designed to carry. Her sister ship was SS Tuscania.

=== Loss ===
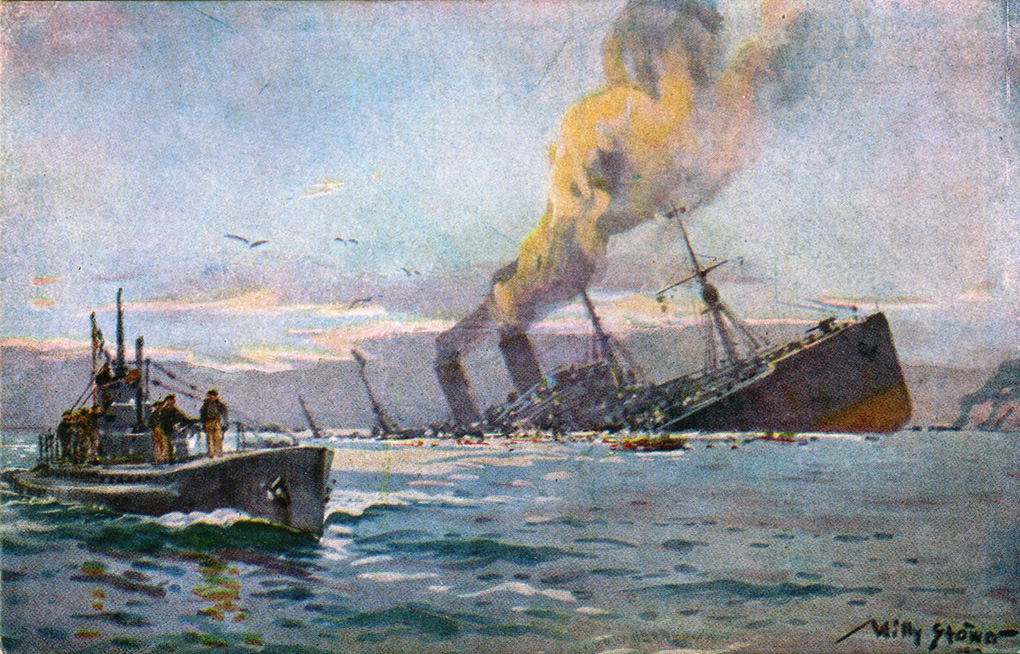
1917 postcard by Willy Stöwer

On 3 May 1917, Transylvania sailed from Marseille to Alexandria with a full complement of troops, escorted by the Japanese destroyers Matsu and Sakaki.

At 10 am on 4 May Transylvania was struck in the port engine room by a torpedo fired by the German U-boat SM U-63 under the command of Otto Schultze. At the time the ship was about 2.5 miles (2.2 nmi; 4.0 km) south of Cape Vado near Savona, in the Gulf of Genoa. Matsu came alongside Transylvania and began to take on board troops while Sakaki circled to force the submarine to remain submerged. Twenty minutes later a second torpedo was seen coming straight for Matsu, which saved herself by going astern at full speed. The torpedo hit Transylvania instead, which sank immediately. Ten crew members, 29 army officers and 373 soldiers lost their lives.

Many bodies of victims were recovered at Savona and buried two days later, in a special plot in the town cemetery. Others are buried elsewhere in Italy, France, Monaco and Spain. The Savona Town Cemetery contains 85 Commonwealth burials from the First World War, all but two of them casualties from Transylvania. Within the cemetery is the Savona Memorial which commemorates a further 275 casualties who died when Transylvania sank, but whose graves are unknown. Amongst those killed was the cricketer Major Richard Worsley.

The wreck of Transylvania was discovered by the Italian Carabinieri on 7 October 2011 off the coast of the island of Bergeggi at an approximate depth of 630 metres (2,070 ft).
