= Cornelis Vels =

South African cricketer

Cornelis Johan Vels (1 March 1867 – 20 April 1963) was a South African cricketer who played two first-class matches when he was 60 years old and lived until the age of 96.

== Life and career ==
Cornelis Vels was born in Philippolis in Orange Free State. He made his first-class debut for Orange Free State against the touring MCC in November 1927, aged 60 years and 269 days. He opened the bowling with Shunter Coen and took no wickets for 106 off 21 overs as the MCC scored 579 for 7 on their way to an innings victory. He played once again for Orange Free State a few weeks later in a friendly match against Natal. In a match ruined by rain he bowled five overs, again taking no wickets. In his two matches he batted at number 10 or 11 and made six runs for once out.

Vels was 60 years 291 days old when he played his last first-class match. There have been nine older players in first-class cricket. However, only one, Raja Maharaj Singh, who was 72 when he played his only first-class match in 1950, was older on debut.

Vels worked as a clerk of the court. He married Agnes Charlotte Mitchell in Ficksburg, Orange Free State, in 1895, and they had three daughters and two sons. Their son Maurice played first-class cricket for Orange Free State in the 1930s.

Cornelis Vels died in Ficksburg in April 1963, aged 96. Agnes and their children survived him.
