= Stephen Hanson =

South African cricketer

Personal information
- Full name: Stephen Llewellyn Hanson
- Born: 8 July 1931; Modderpoort, Orange Free State, South Africa
- Died: 27 June 1997 (aged 65); Roodepoort, Gauteng, South Africa
- Batting: Right-handed
- Bowling: Right-arm off-spin

Domestic team information
- Years: Team
- 1950–51 to 1958–59: Orange Free State

Career statistics
Competition	First-class
Matches	43
Runs scored	1861
Batting average	23.85
100s/50s	2/12
Top score	134
Balls bowled	2632
Wickets	25
Bowling average	51.28
5 wickets in innings	0
10 wickets in match	0
Best bowling	4/112
Catches/stumpings	27/–
- Source: Cricinfo, 27 January 2018

Stephen Llewellyn Hanson (8 July 1931 – 27 June 1997) was a South African cricketer who played first-class cricket for Orange Free State from 1950 to 1959.

Hanson was a right-handed opening batsman and off-spin bowler. He captained Orange Free State from 1954–55 to 1956–57. In their only Currie Cup victory in this period, in January 1956, he scored 22 and 70 (Orange Free State's highest score in the match) and took 3 for 39 in the second innings, including the final wicket, to give his team an 80-run victory over Griqualand West.

Hanson's best season was 1954–55, when he scored his two first-class centuries. Orange Free State struggled in the "A" Section of the Currie Cup, losing five and drawing one of their six matches, but Hanson led their batting with 472 runs at an average of 39.33. Against Natal at Bloemfontein, he top-scored in each innings with 72 and 134; in the second innings he added 161 for the seventh wicket with the 16-year-old Peter Carlstein, who was making his first-class debut.
