= Tony Evans =

Tony Evans may refer to:

== Sports ==
- Tony Evans (Australian footballer, born 1966), former Australian rules footballer with St Kilda and Footscray
- Tony Evans (Australian footballer, born 1969), former Australian rules footballer with the West Coast Eagles
- Tony Evans (footballer, born 1954), English footballer for Cardiff City and Birmingham City
- Tony Evans (footballer, born 1960), English footballer for Colchester United
- Tony Evans (New Zealand footballer), New Zealand international football (soccer) player

== Others ==
- Tony Evans (pastor) (born 1949), Christian pastor and a radio broadcaster
- Tony Evans (EastEnders), a fictional character in soap opera, EastEnders

== See also ==
- Anthony Evans (disambiguation)
