= Loos Memorial =

WWI CWGC memorial in Pas-de-Calais, France

- Commonwealth War Graves Commission (CWGC)
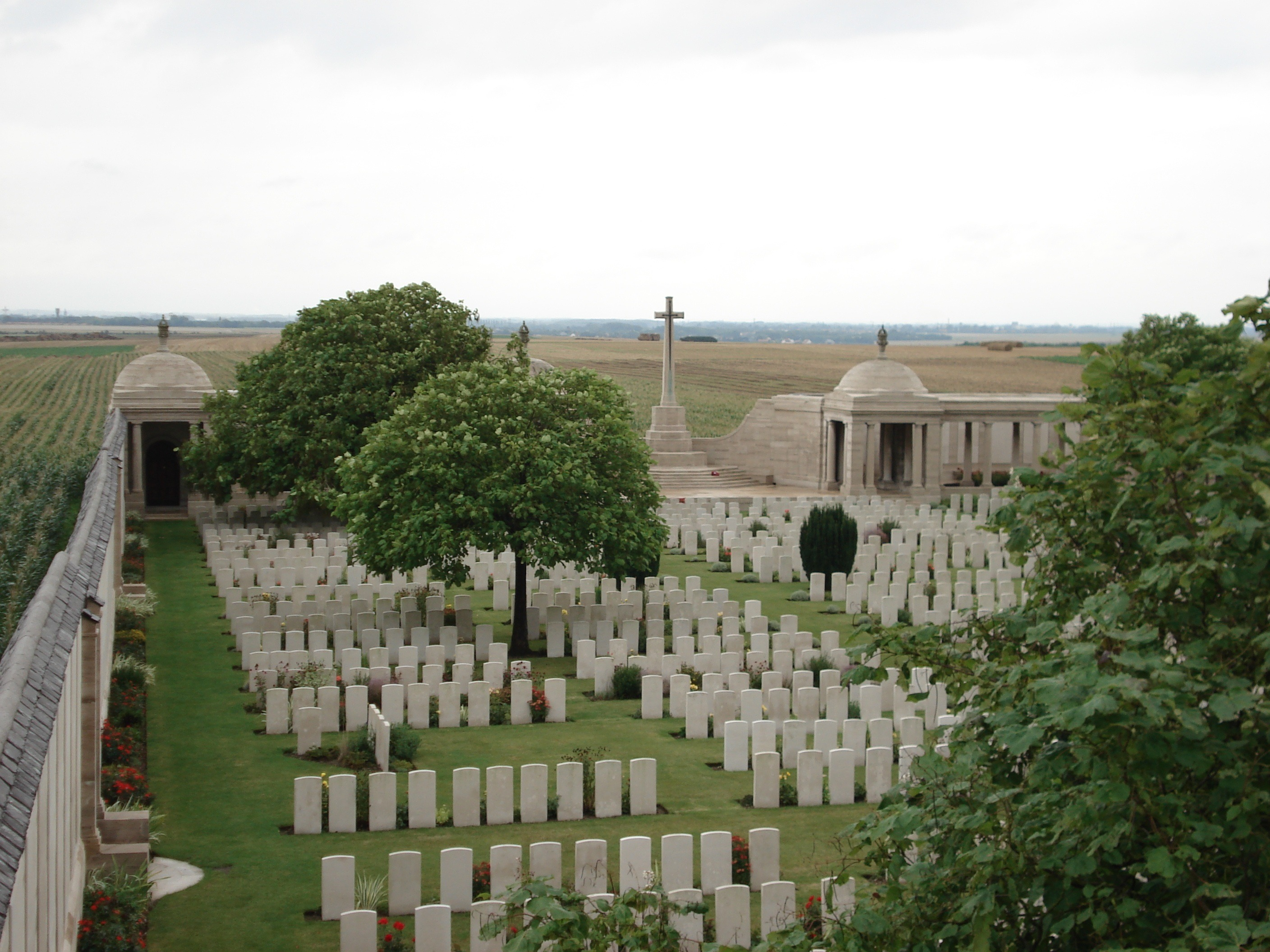
- View of the cemetery with the apses and Cross of Sacrifice of the memorial in the background
- For British and Commonwealth forces
- Unveiled: 4 August 1930
- Location: 50°27′37.98″N 02°46′17.05″E
- Designed by: Sir Herbert Baker (architect); Sir Charles Wheeler (sculptor)
- To the glory of God and in memory of 20,598 officers and men of the forces of the British Empire who fell in the Battles of Loos and Béthune and other actions in this neighbourhood, whose names are here recorded but to whom the fortunes of war denied the known and honoured burial given to their comrades in death.

UNESCO World Heritage Site
- Official name: Funerary and memory sites of the First World War (Western Front)
- Type: Cultural
- Criteria: i, ii, vi
- Designated: 2023 (45th session)
- Reference no.: 1567-PC12

The Loos Memorial is a World War I memorial forming the sides and rear of Dud Corner Cemetery, located near the commune of Loos-en-Gohelle, in the Pas-de-Calais département of France. The memorial lists 20,610 names of British and Commonwealth soldiers with no known grave who were killed in the area during and after the Battle of Loos, which started on 25 September 1915. This memorial covers the same sector of the front as the Le Touret Memorial, with each memorial commemorating the dead either side of the date of the start of the Battle of Loos.

Designed by Sir Herbert Baker, the sculptures were by Sir Charles Wheeler. The memorial was unveiled on 4 August 1930 by General Sir Nevil Macready. Macready served as Adjutant-General of the British Expeditionary Force (BEF) from the outbreak of the war to February 1916, and then served as Adjutant-General to the Forces until a few months before the end of the war in November 1918.

== Notable commemoratees ==
Three posthumous Victoria Cross recipients are commemorated on this memorial under their respective regiments:

- Lieutenant-Colonel Angus Douglas-Hamilton
- Private George Peachment
- Second Lieutenant Frank Wearne

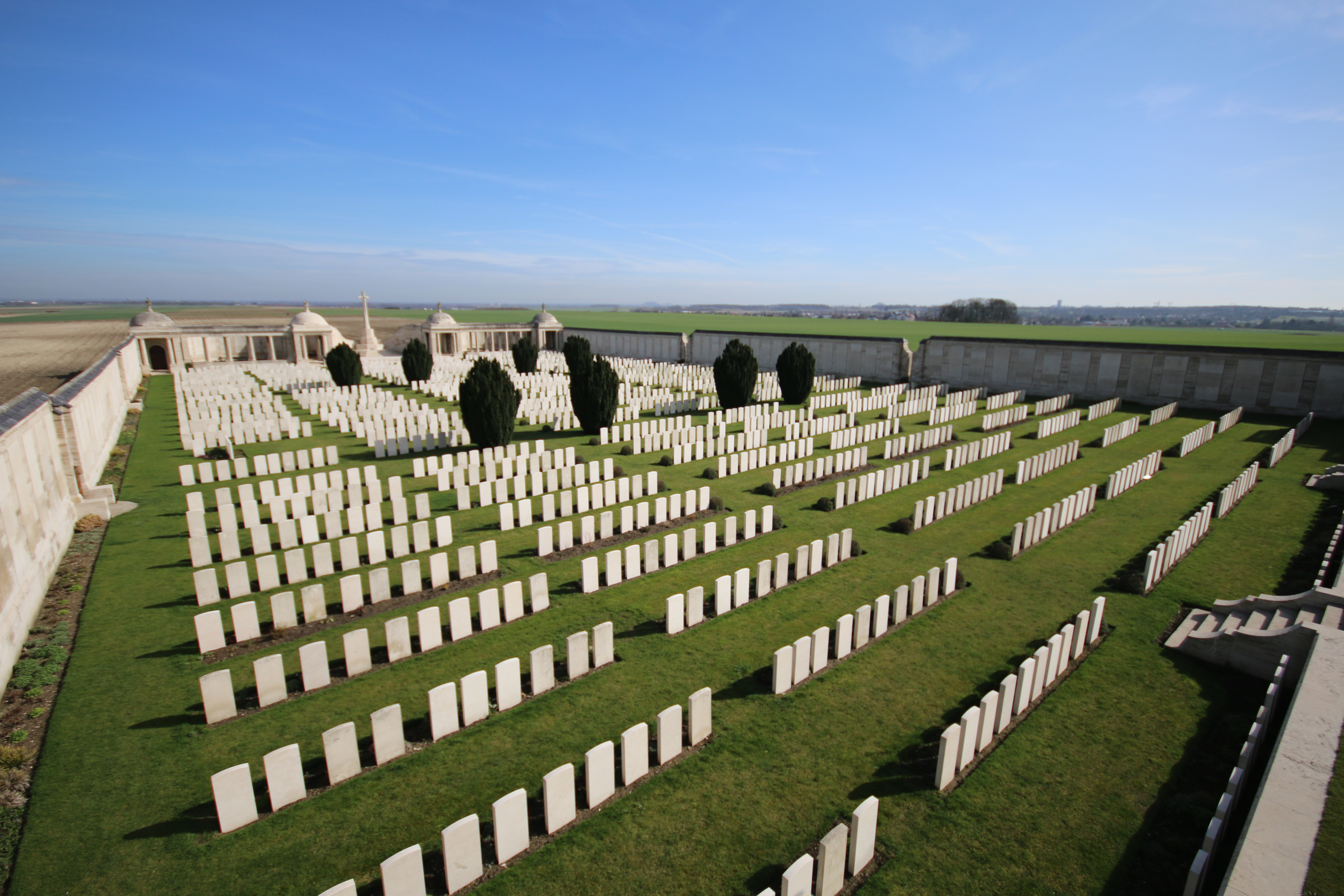
Loos Memorial March 2017.

Also commemorated on this memorial are:

- Scots rugby international Second Lieutenant Walter Michael Dickson
- English first-class cricketer Arthur Edwards.
- England rugby international Second Lieutenant Douglas Lambert.
- British Member of Parliament Second Lieutenant The Hon. Charles Thomas Mills.
- poet Captain Charles Sorley
- Wales rugby international Lieutenant-Colonel Richard Garnons Williams.
