= Arthur Edwards (cricketer) =

English cricketer and British Army officer

Personal information
- Full name: Arthur Corbett Edwards
- Born: 10 September 1871; Portsmouth, Hampshire, England
- Died: 26 September 1915 (aged 44); Loos-en-Gohelle, Pas-de-Calais, France
- Batting: Unknown
- Bowling: Unknown

Domestic team information
- Years: Team
- 1902/03: Europeans
- 1903/04: Orange Free State

Career statistics
Competition	First-class
Matches	2
Runs scored	24
Batting average	6.00
100s/50s	–/–
Top score	13
Balls bowled	78
Wickets	2
Bowling average	31.00
5 wickets in innings	–
10 wickets in match	–
Best bowling	2/59
Catches/stumpings	1/–
- Source: ESPNcricinfo, 6 October 2020

Arthur Corbett Edwards (10 September 1871 – 26 September 1915) was an English first-class cricketer and British Army officer.

The son of Lieutenant General Sir J. Bevan Edwards, he was born at Portsmouth in September 1871. He was educated at Eton College, before going up to St Edmund Hall, Oxford. Though he never played first-class cricket for Oxford University, he did have trials for Kent in 1895 when he played for their second XI against the second XI of Middlesex. He was a good all-rounder for Folkestone Cricket Club in Kent club cricket. Edwards was commissioned as a second lieutenant in the Queen's Own Royal West Kent Regiment in December 1891, while studying at Oxford, and was promoted to lieutenant in December 1894, with promotion to captain following in June 1900. Edwards resigned his commission in October 1901, later spending time abroad where he played first-class cricket in British India for the Europeans cricket team against the Parsees at Poona in the Bombay Presidency Match of September 1902. He made a second first-class appearance in South Africa for Orange Free State against Transvaal in the semi-final of the 1903–04 Currie Cup played at Bloemfontein.

Edwards was re-commissioned into the Queen's Own Royal West Kent Regiment during the First World War, which began in August 1914 (see British entry into World War I), with him being granted the temporary rank of major in September. He arrived in France on 1 September 1915 and travelled with the 8th (Service) Battalion of the Royal West Kents, a unit of Kitchener's Army, to Boulogne, France, before undertaking training at Étaples. On 25 September, the battalion marched to Béthune to take part in the Battle of Loos. Ordered to attack Vermelles, these orders changed instead to an attack during the morning of 26 September. Ordered to take an objective at Hulluch, the West Kent's attacked at 10:30am GMT over a stretch of no-man's-land which was a mile wide. Despite suffering heavy casualties, they reached their objective only to discover the German barbed wire defences still intact, despite an earlier artillery bombardment. With a division on their right flank suffering severe casualties and being forced to withdraw, this left the West Kent's exposed to machine gun fire on their right flank as well as from in front of them. It was during this part of the engagement that Edwards was killed in action. His body was never recovered from the battlefield and he is memorialised at the Loos Memorial.
