= Pan African Resources =

South Africa-based gold mining business

Pan African Resources plc
- Type: Public
- Traded as: LSE: PAF
- Industry: Mining
- Founded: 2000; 26 years ago
- Headquarters: Johannesburg, South Africa
- Key people: Keith Spencer (chairman); Cobus Loots (CEO)
- Revenue: ▲$1,156.5 million (2026)
- Operating income: ▲$545.8 million (2026)
- Net income: ▲$356.9 million (2026)
- Website: www.panafricanresources.com

Pan African Resources plc is a large gold mining business based in Johannesburg, South Africa and with its registered office in London, UK. It is listed on the London Stock Exchange and the Johannesburg Stock Exchange and is a constituent of the FTSE 250 Index.

== History ==
The company was established to undertake mineral exploration in 2000. It then focussed on gold mining after acquiring mines in Barberton, South Africa in 2007.

The company was the subject of an initial public offering on the Alternative Investment Market of the London Stock Exchange and the Johannesburg Stock Exchange in 2007. It significantly increased production after buying a gold mine in Evander, South Africa in 2009.

In November 2024, the company acquired Tennant Consolidated Mining Group, a gold and copper mining business operating in Australia, for $50.8m; the purchase included Nobles, a gold mine at Tennant Creek in the Northern Territory. Then, in October 2024, the company commissioned a tailings retreatment plant at Mogale in South Africa.

The company transferred to the main market of the London Stock Exchange in October 2025.
