= Mick Commaille =

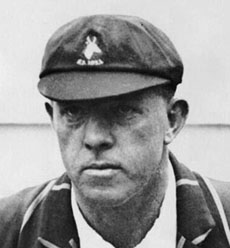
- Mick Commaille in 1924

Cricket information
- Batting: Right-handed

International information
- National side: South Africa

Career statistics
Competition	Tests	First-class
Matches	12	96
Runs scored	355	5026
Batting average	16.90	32.21
100s/50s	0/0	9/27
Top score	47	186
Balls bowled	–	72
Wickets	–	1
Bowling average	–	33.00
5 wickets in innings	–	0
10 wickets in match	–	0
Best bowling	–	1/15
Catches/stumpings	1/-	32/-
- Source: Cricinfo

John McIllwaine Moore "Mick" Commaille (born 21 February 1883 in Cape Town, Cape Province, died 28 July 1956 in Sea Point, Cape Province) was a South African cricketer who played in 12 Tests from 1909–10 to 1927–28. He also played international amateur football for South Africa.

Commaille had a very long cricket career as a right-handed opening batsman, first appearing for Western Province in 1905–06 and not making his final first-class appearance until 1930–31, when he was playing for Griqualand West.

== Cricket before the First World War ==
Commaille made a single appearance as a middle-order batsman for Western Province against the 1905–06 MCC side, making little impression. He returned to the Western Province side as an opening batsman in the 1908–09 Currie Cup competition, scoring 74 in the match against Border. A few days later he scored 34 and 65 against Transvaal as Western Province beat their rivals by six runs to take the Cup.

In the 1909–10 season, an England team toured South Africa, playing its non-Test matches as Marylebone Cricket Club (MCC). The game against Western Province was won by MCC by an innings inside two days, and Commaille scored only 13 and 14 in the two Western Province innings. Despite this modest record, Commaille was picked for the South Africa team for the first Test, batting down the order at No 8 in the first innings and No 9 in the second; he scored just 8 in the first innings but in the second he made 19 and put on 74 for the eighth wicket with Aubrey Faulkner, who made 123. Commaille's adhesive powers were demonstrated again in the second Test. Having failed with a score of just 3 in the first innings when batting at No 9, he was promoted to No 6 in the second innings and scored 30 out of 103 made while he was at the wicket as South Africa amassed a match-winning total after a tie on first innings. There was further promotion up the batting order in the third Test: he scored 39 batting at No 6 in the first innings and then just 2 batting at No 3 in the second. Finally in the fourth Test he was tried as an opening batsman alongside Billy Zulch and responded with an innings of 42, his highest of the series and the highest of the South African first innings; he scored just three in the second innings. He was not successful in the final Test, scoring just four and five as England won easily. In the five Tests, Commaille scored 155 runs at an average of just 15.50.

Despite this modest performance, Commaille was selected for the 1910–11 tour of Australia, the first Test tour of Australia by a South African team. He was not successful on the tour, however, and was selected for only six first-class matches and none of the Tests; in some games he batted as low as No 10 and his highest score on tour was just 29, with an average of only 9.90. Commaille supplemented his cricket with some journalism on the tour, writing an adulatory article about the Tasmanian leg of the tour for The Argus newspaper.

He was more successful in domestic South African cricket in 1912–13 and scored 55 and 103, his first century, in the match against Orange Free State. In 1913–14, there was another tour of South Africa by an England team; Commaille played in both the first-class matches for Western Province against the touring side, and scored 52 in the second of them, but by this time all the Tests had been played and he had not been picked for any of them.

== Football career ==
Alongside his cricket career, Commaille was also prominent in South African Association football as both a player and an administrator; in 1913, he was the honorary secretary of the Football Association of South Africa at a time when a triangular Commonwealth series of internationals between England, South Africa and Australia was proposed (and rejected). As a player, he represented South Africa at either outside- or inside-right.

== Cricket after the First World War ==
Commaille resumed his first-class cricket career with matches against the Australian Imperial Forces cricket team in 1919–20, and when proper domestic competition returned in 1920–21 he was immediately far more successful than he had been in any season pre-War. In the first Western Province game of the season against a very weak Border team he made 156, more than the opposing team made in their two innings combined. Later in the season he hit a second century against Griqualand West. There were tours to South Africa by Australia in 1921–22 and England in 1922–23, and Commaille played in the Western Province games against both sides, but did not earn a Test recall. In 1923–24 at the age of 40, he had his best domestic season, with unbeaten centuries against Natal and Griqualand West, and with places still up for grabs on the 1924 tour to England Commaille captained one of two trial sides in an end-of-season match, after which the team was chosen. Commaille's team lost the match to Neville Lindsay's team convincingly, but Commaille was picked for the tour and Lindsay was not.

Commaille was not merely a player on the tour to England in 1924; he was vice-captain to Herbie Taylor. Taylor, however, played in every single first-class match on the tour and Commaille's captaincy was restricted to three non-first-class games against Scotland, Durham and a side from North Wales. But he played regularly as an opening batsman, and scored 1118 first-class runs at an average of 25.40 and with a highest score of 85. Wisden Cricketers' Almanack wrote of him that he was a "good useful batsman but, though a consistent run-getter, he did nothing out of the common". Commaille appeared in all five Test matches. In the first game, Commaille's first Test for 14 years, the South Africans were sensationally dismissed in the first innings for just 30, and Commaille, batting at No 5, was the not-out batsman, though he made only one run; in the second innings, he resumed his more normal position as an opener and made 29 out of 101 runs added while he was at the wicket, as the South Africans totalled 390, still losing the match by an innings. The second Test had a similar result, but more even batting by the South Africans; Commaille was out without scoring in the first innings but made 37, his best of the series, in the second. Commaille's personal pattern for the series was maintained in the third Test, with just four runs in the first innings and 31 in the second. Rain ruined the final two Tests, but Commaille was not successful in either of his two single innings in these matches: he failed to reach double figures in the first innings in all five Tests. In the five Tests, he scored 113 runs at an average of 16.14.

Back in South Africa in 1924–25, Commaille switched allegiance from Western Province to Orange Free State and two years later in 1926–27 he made the highest score of his long career, an innings of 186 against Natal in which he shared a second-wicket partnership of 305 with Shunter Coen which remains a Free State first-class record to this day. In the following match, the same pairing hit off the 236 runs needed for victory over Eastern Province to set the record for the first-wicket partnership that also remains unbeaten.

In 1927–28, England toured South Africa. Commaille, just a few months short of his 44th birthday, made 77 and 54 in the first-class match between Orange Free State and the English team (playing as MCC). He followed that with a century in a non-competitive two-day first-class game against Natal and was then picked for the first two Tests of the five-match series. In the first match, he scored 23 and 4 in a game of many low scores – only 12 out of 35 individual innings reached double figures. In the second game, he followed a first innings of 13 with a score of 47 in the second innings, his best in Tests, and he shared an opening partnership of 115 with Herbie Taylor which constituted more than half the South African total of 224. With the South Africans losing both the first two Tests, however, he was dropped from the team for the subsequent matches in which a series draw was obtained, and he did not play Test cricket again.

Commaille continued in first-class cricket for a further three seasons, switching teams to Griqualand West in 1929–30 and finally retiring after a single game in 1930–31.
