= George Peachment =

Recipient of the Victoria Cross

George Stanley Peachment
- Born: 5 May 1897; Bury, Lancashire
- Died: 25 September 1915 (aged 18) near Hulluch, France
- Burial place: Remembered on the Loos Memorial
- Military career
- Allegiance: United Kingdom
- Branch: British Army
- Service years: 1915
- Rank: Private
- Service number: R/11941
- Units: King's Royal Rifle Corps
- Conflicts: World War I: Battle of Loos †
- Awards: Victoria Cross

George Stanley Peachment VC (5 May 1897 – 25 September 1915) was an English recipient of the Victoria Cross, the highest and most prestigious award for gallantry in the face of the enemy that can be awarded to British and Commonwealth forces.

Before he joined up in April 1915, Peachment was an apprentice steam engine maker in Bury, Lancashire. He enlisted at only 17 years and 11 months old giving a false age. He joined the 6th battalion, King's Royal Rifle Corps, later transferring to the 2nd battalion.

Peachment was a private in the 2nd Battalion, The King's Royal Rifle Corps, British Army during World War I at the Battle of Loos, on 25 September 1915 near Hulluch, France, when his actions led to the award of the Victoria Cross.

His citation in the London Gazette reads:

For the most conspicuous bravery near Hulluch on 25th Sept., 1915. During very heavy fighting, when our front line was compelled to retire in order to re-organise, Pte. Peachment, seeing his Company Commander, Captain Dubs, lying wounded, crawled to assist him. The enemy's fire was intense, but, though there was a shell hole quite close, in which a few men had taken cover, Pte. Peachment never thought of saving himself. He knelt in the open by his Officer and tried to help him, but while doing this he was first wounded by a bomb and a minute later mortally wounded by a rifle bullet. He was one of the youngest men in his battalion and gave this splendid example of courage and self-sacrifice.

Peachment at 18 years and 4 months was the second youngest army recipient of the VC in World War I, after John Cornwell.

His medal is held in the Lord Ashcroft VC Collection at the Imperial War Museum.

== Bibliography ==
- Ashcroft, Michael (2007) [2006]. Victoria Cross Heroes. London: Headline Review. ISBN 978-0-7553-1633-5.
- Batchelor, Peter; Matson, Christopher (2011). The Western Front 1915. VCs of the First World War. Stroud, Gloucestershire: The History Press. ISBN 978-0-7524-6057-4.
- Buzzell, Nora, ed. (1997). The Register of the Victoria Cross. Cheltenham, Gloucestershire: This England Alma House. ISBN 0-906324-27-0.
- Monuments to Courage (David Harvey, 1999)
