= Barberton, South Africa =

Barberton
- Location within Mpumalanga Location within South Africa Location within Africa
- Coordinates: 25°47′10″S 31°3′11″E
- Country: South Africa
- Province: Mpumalanga
- District: Ehlanzeni
- Municipality: Mbombela
- Established: 1884

Area
  - Total: 37.74 km^{2} (14.57 sq mi)

Population (2011)
  - Total: 11,997
  - Density: 317.9/km^{2} (823.3/sq mi)

Racial makeup (2011)
  - Black African: 44.2%
  - Coloured: 8.5%
  - Indian/Asian: 4.9%
  - White: 41.9%
  - Other: 0.4%

First languages (2011)
  - Afrikaans: 47.9%
  - English: 22.7%
  - Swazi: 20.8%
  - Zulu: 2.2%
  - Other: 6.4%
- Time zone: UTC+2 (SAST)
- Postal code (street): 1300
- PO box: 1300
- Area code: 013

Barberton is a town in the Mpumalanga province of South Africa, which has its origin in the 1880s gold rush in the region. It is situated in the De Kaap Valley and is fringed by the Makhonjwa Mountains. It is 43 kilometres (27 mi) south of Mbombela and 360 kilometres (220 mi) east of Johannesburg.

Barberton was the seat of the Umjindi Local Municipality until the day of the 2016 Municipal Elections, when the Umjindi Local Municipality was merged into the Mbombela Local Municipality.

== History ==
=== Prehistoric ===
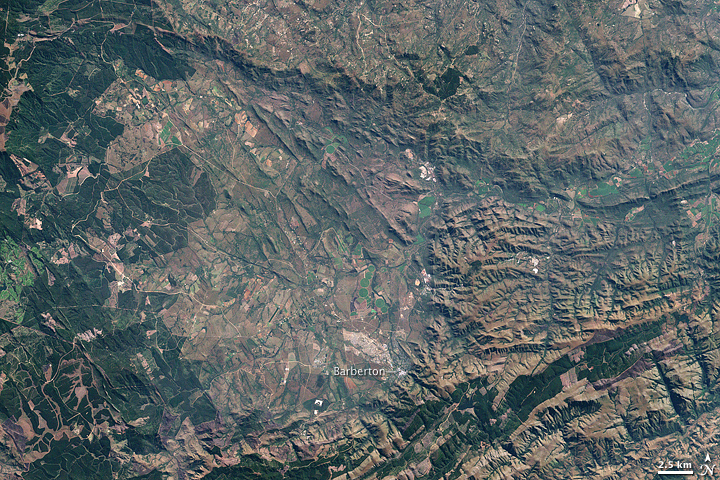
The Barberton Mountain Range, 2001 image from NASA's Landsat 7 satellite

The Barberton Makhonjwa Mountains, a UNESCO World Heritage Site, are amongst the oldest in the world, dating back 3.5 billion years. The mountains have some of the oldest exposed rocks on the planet. The volcanic rocks make up 40% of what scientists call the Barberton Greenstone Belt, and have provided direct evidence of the conditions of life on the surface of the very early Earth.

In the satellite image, the bare rocks of mountain peaks appear as a pale grey-green, accentuated by the sharp relief of sunlit slopes and their shadows. Deeper shades of green indicate vegetation, including some vegetation on the lower slopes. In the mountain valleys, bright green areas suggest well-watered grassy areas and crops. Deeper green areas are probably forests. The series of bright green circles north of the town of Barberton result from centre-pivot irrigation systems. The area north and west of Barberton appears slightly pale and fuzzy compared to the rest of this image, probably the result of low-lying haze.

The first form of life on earth, a bacterial micro-fossil Archaeosphaeroides barbertonensis was discovered here in 1967 and has been identified as being 3.26 billion years old.

=== Discovery of Gold and the Founding of Barberton ===
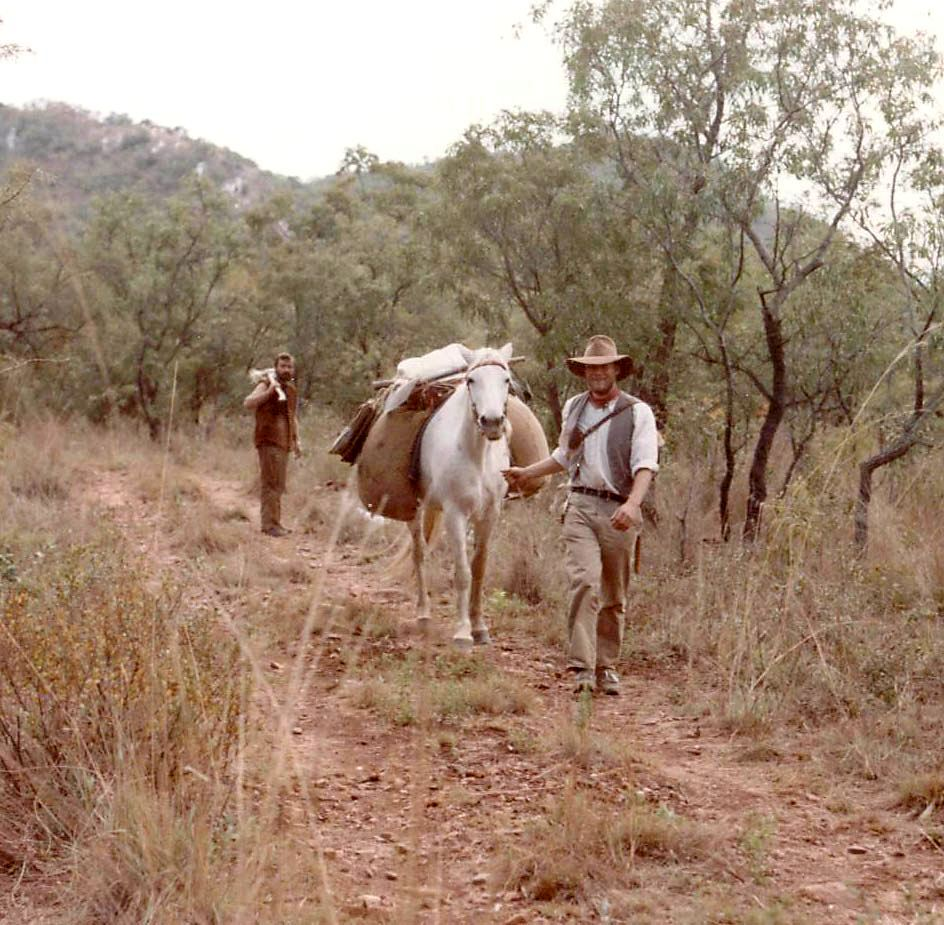
19 June 1984, Participants in the Barberton Centenary Trek make their way through the Kaap Valley en route to Barberton for the centenary celebration.

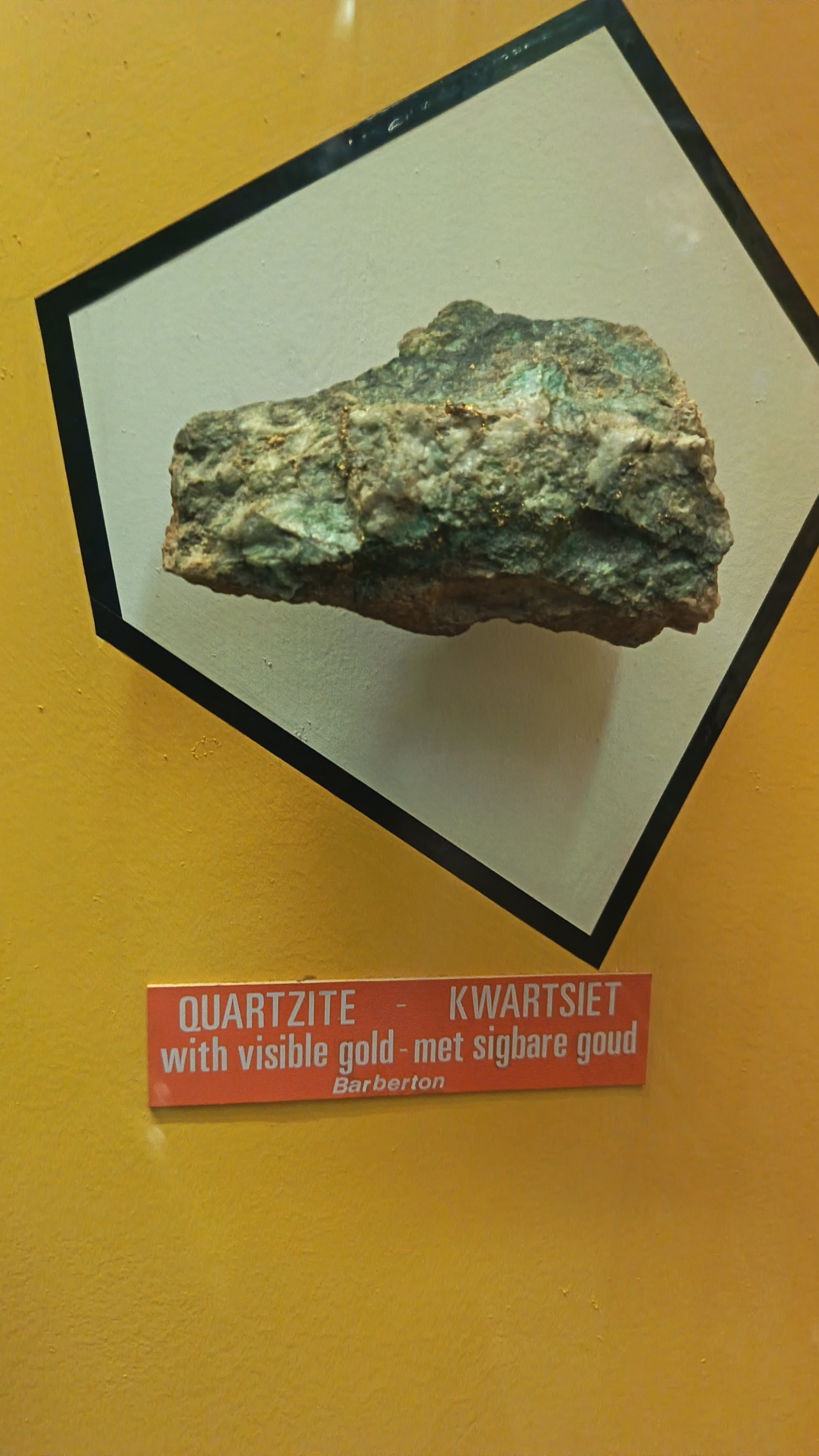
Quartzite with gold from Barberton.

In 1881, alluvial gold was discovered by Tom McLachlan in the Barberton area. at Jamestown. However, due to the location (the hot and humid Lowveld region was rife with malaria) no one wanted to risk going there until Auguste Roberts ("French Bob") discovered gold in Concession Creek on 20 June 1883. This discovery resulted in a gold rush to the area.

On 21 June 1884, Graham Barber wrote a letter to the State Secretary to inform him that he and his two cousins Fred and Harry discovered payable gold on state land where the Umvoti Creek entered the De Kaap valley. The State Secretary then asked the Magistrate in Lydenburg to investigate the matter and for David Wilson, the Gold Commissioner, to submit a report. Wilson investigated on 24 July 1884 and declared the township of Barberton.

The town was named after Graham Hoare Barber (1835-1888) who discovered a rich gold-bearing reef there in 1884. Barberton became a municipality in 1904.

At first it was just a simple mining camp but grew when Edwin Bray, a prospector discovered gold in the hills above Barberton in 1885 and with 14 partners started the Sheba Reef Gold Mining Company.

Large amounts of money flowed into Barberton and the first Stock Exchange to operate in the then Transvaal opened its doors. More buildings were erected, billiard saloons and music halls established. The Criterion and Royal Standard hotels were opened. In 1896, Barberton was connected by rail to the Netherlands-South African Railway Company (NZASM)'s Oosterlijn (Pretoria to Lourenço Marques) through a specifically constructed side line running from Kaapmuiden to Barberton.

Gold mining in Barberton flourished for only a brief period and soon the inhabitants began to move away to the newly discovered gold fields on the Reef.

Among the owners of mines in the Barberton area is Pan African Resources.

On 5 February 2016, 87 miners were rescued after a cave-in at the main entrance of Makonjwaan Gold Mine, operated by Australian-based Vantage Goldfields. Three people were still missing.

=== Second Boer War ===
In 1901, during the Second Boer War (1899–1902), British colonial troops established a concentration camp for the Boers at Barberton.

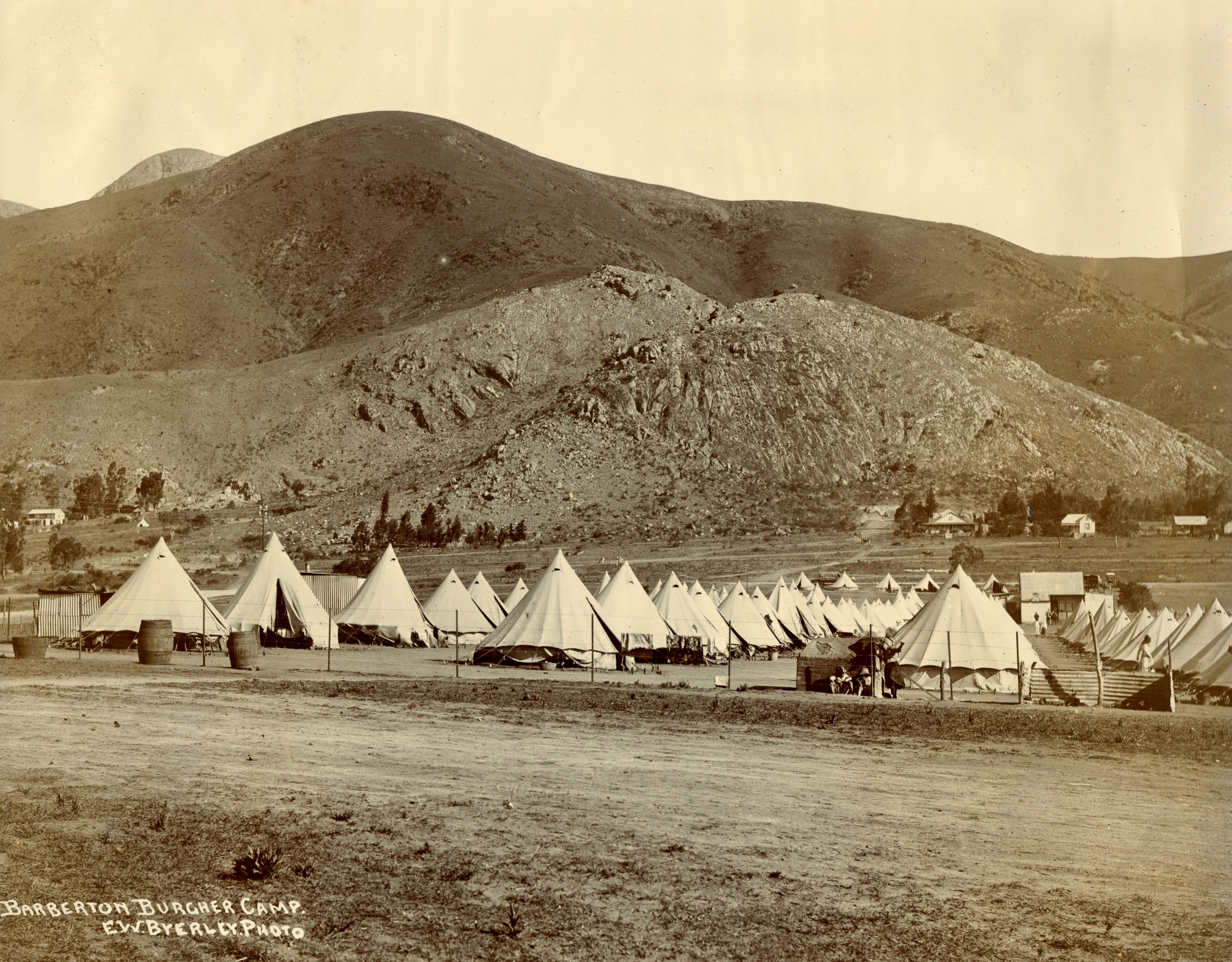
The British concentration camp at Barberton in 1901

== Songimvelo Game Reserve ==
This reserve is situated in the Barberton Mountain lands and is the Mpumalanga Parks Board's largest reserve, extending over 500 square kilometres.

== Other facts ==
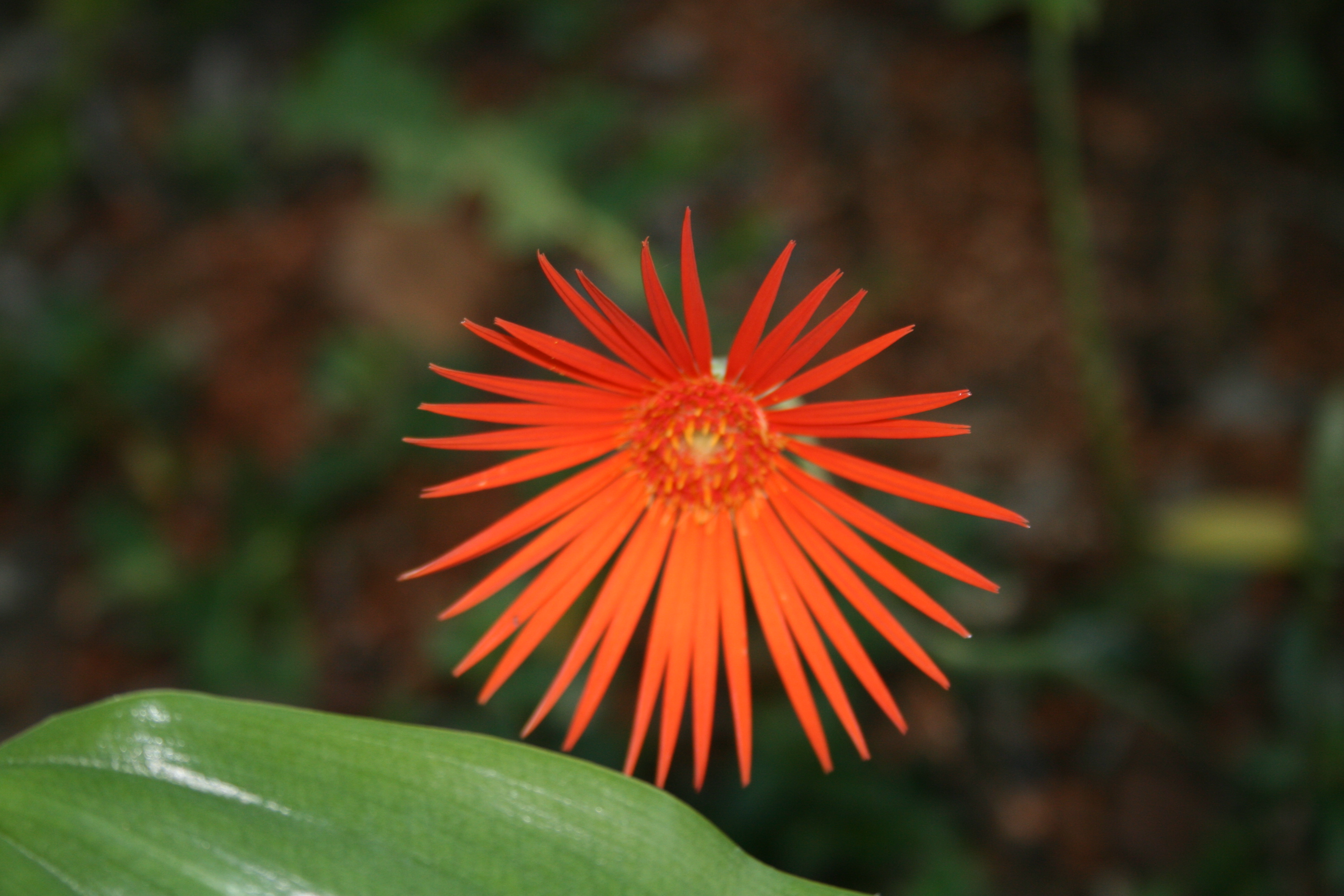
The Barberton Daisy.

- A popular flowering plant, the Barberton daisy (Gerbera jamesonii) was discovered here in 1889 by Robert Jameson.
- An area south-west of town was the site of one of the more than forty concentration camps built by the British during the Second Boer War to house Boer women and children.
- Sheba Mine is today one of the oldest and richest working gold mines in the world, having been in production for more than a century. It is estimated that production will continue for several decades to come.
- Pat Pattle, regarded by many as possibly the top-scoring Allied fighter ace of World War II, worked at the Sheba mine briefly.
- Barberton was home to Sir Percy FitzPatrick, author of Jock of the Bushveld.
- Barberton (or, at least, a depiction of Barberton) is featured in Bryce Courtenay's novel The Power of One, as the main character's hometown.
- A character in the Sherlock Holmes adventure "The Disappearance of Lady Frances Carfax" made his fortune in Barberton.

== Schools ==
=== High schools ===
- Barberton High School
- Emjindini High School
- Chief Funwako High School
- Kwamhola Secondary School
- Barberton Secondary school
- Gateway Christian School

=== Primary schools ===
- Barberton Primary School
- Ekucathuzeni Primary School
- Mhola Primary School
- Sikhutsele Primary School
- Amon Nkosi Primary School
- Glenthorpe Primary School
- Ngwane Primary School
- SA Makam Primary School
- Khanyisile Primary School
- Fairview Primary School
- Ekhiyeni Primary School
- Mountain View Primary School
- Kaapvallei Primary School

== Coat of arms ==
By 1931, the Barberton municipality had assumed a coat of arms. It was registered with the Transvaal Provincial Administration and the Bureau of Heraldry in 1969. The municipality's legal successor, the Umjindi local municipality, now bears the arms. In 2016 the Umjinji local municipality was disestablished, Barberton is now under Mbombela Local Municipality.

The arms are: Per fess Vert, and Or, in chief a stamp battery Or, and in base three Barberton daisies in fess slipped and leaved proper (i.e. the shield is divided by a horizontal line, the upper half shows a golden stamp battery on a green background and the lower half shows three Barberton daisies on a golden background). The crest is an impala's head, and the motto is Consilio et labore.

== Notable people ==
- Joan Morice, first female qualified veterinarian in South Africa
- Sbu Nkosi, South Africa national rugby union team player
- Christiaan Papenfus, cricketer
- Dr Enos Mabuza, Teacher and apartheid activist

== See also ==
- Ivan Mitford-Barberton
