= Joan Morice =

(1904–1944) First female South African veterinary surgeon

Joan Alison Morice
- Born: 5 October 1904; Barberton, Transvaal Colony
- Died: 24 November 1944 (aged 40); Johannesburg, South Africa
- Education: University of the Witwatersrand; Onderstepoort Veterinary Institute
- Known for: First female South Africa veterinary surgeon
- Spouse: Maurice Connell Robinson
- Children: 1
- Scientific career
- Workplaces: Allerton Laboratory

Joan Alison Morice (5 October 1904 – 24 November 1944) was the first woman to qualify and practice as a veterinary surgeon in South Africa. She graduated from Onderstepoort Veterinary Institute, South Africa in 1927 and it was nineteen years later that the next woman, Maud Bales, qualified as a veterinary surgeon in South Africa. Morice immediately started a private veterinary practice which lasted until 1935. She died at an early age from cancer in 1944.

== Life and career ==
Morice was born in 1904 in Barberton, Transvaal Colony to Andrew Morice and Alice Mary Morice (née Roberts). She was sent to England for her early education. In 1922 she returned to South Africa and enrolled in a veterinary surgery course. Morice completed the first two years of the degree at the University of the Witwatersrand and the last year at the Onderstepoort Veterinary Institute of the Transvaal University College.

In 1927 Morice received her Bachelor of Veterinary Science and worked at Onderstepoort and the Allerton Laboratory (in what was formerly Natal, now KwaZulu-Natal) as a temporary veterinary officer until December 1928, after which she started her own private practice in Johannesburg.

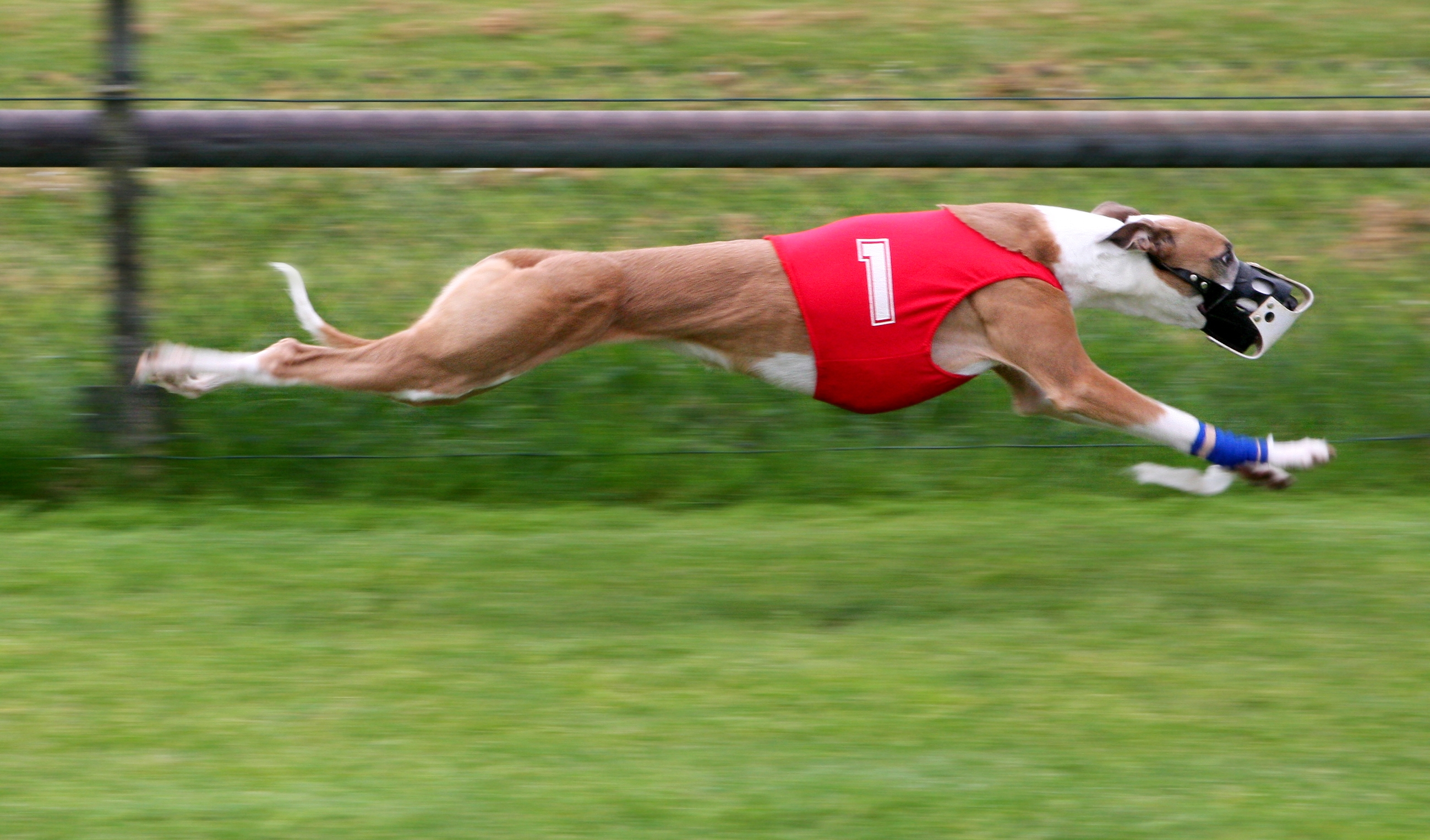
Greyhound in a race

In 1930 she married Maurice Connell Robinson, who had also qualified as a vet in 1928, and they ran the practice together. They abandoned the practice in 1935 but Morice kept her appointment as the veterinary surgeon to the Johannesburg Greyhound Racing Club and the Rand Hunt Club. Morice also did charitable work for the predecessor of the NSPCA and the Bantu Animal Welfare Association while her husband joined the municipal service of Johannesburg.

Morice died in 1944 from lung cancer.

== See also ==
- Aleen Cust – 1922, first female veterinary surgeon to be recognised by the Royal College of Veterinary Surgeons, London.
