= Peter Carlstein =

South African cricketer

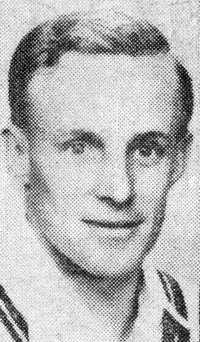
- Carlstein in 1963

Personal information
- Full name: Peter Rudolph Carlstein
- Born: 28 October 1938; Klerksdorp, South Africa
- Died: 12 October 2023 (aged 84)
- Batting: Right-handed
- Bowling: Leg spin
- Role: Batsman

International information
- National side: South Africa
- Test debut: 28 February 1958 v Australia
- Last Test: 24 January 1964 v Australia

Domestic team information
- Years: Team
- 1954/55–1957/58: Orange Free State
- 1958/59–1971/72: Transvaal
- 1964/65–1966/67: Natal
- 1967/68–1979/80: Rhodesia

Career statistics
Competition	Test	FC	LA
Matches	8	148	14
Runs scored	190	7,554	369
Batting average	14.61	31.60	36.90
100s/50s	0	9/46	1/0
Top score	42	229	167*
Balls bowled	–	788	–
Wickets	–	9	–
Bowling average	–	53.33	–
5 wickets in innings	–	0	–
10 wickets in match	–	0	–
Best bowling	–	3/37	–
Catches/stumpings	3/–	82/–	0/–
- Source: Cricket Archive, 23 December 2010

Peter Rudolph Carlstein (28 October 1938 – 12 October 2023) was a South African cricketer who played as a middle-order batsman in eight Test matches from 1958 to 1964.

== Career ==
Carlstein made his first-class debut at the age of 16 for Orange Free State against Natal at Bloemfontein in 1954–55; in the second innings he scored 54 and added 161 for the seventh wicket with his captain, Stephen Hanson. Three years later, still in his teens, he made his Test debut in the Fifth Test against Australia in 1957–58, scoring 32 in the first innings batting at number eight.

He toured England in 1960, scoring 980 runs in 23 first-class matches at an average of 29.69, with a top score of 151 against Hampshire. He played all five Tests, but scored only 119 runs, making his top Test score of 42 in the Fifth Test at The Oval.

He played in the First and Fourth Tests in Australia in 1963–64, making 37 in the Fourth Test in Adelaide, which South Africa won. While the team was in New Zealand in late February 1964, he received the news that his wife and three of his four children had died in a motor accident, and returned to South Africa immediately.

Carlstein continued to play first-class cricket until 1979–80, when he was 41, 25 seasons after his first match. His highest score was 229 for Transvaal against the International Cavaliers in 1962–63, which was also his most successful season, with 852 runs at 71.00 including two other centuries. He was Rhodesian Player of the Year 1967–68.

After his first-class career ended in the early 1980s he moved to Perth in Western Australia, where he played and then coached at the Subiaco Floreat Cricket Club.

According to Wally Grout, Carlstein was "a descendant of a European royal family". This was a misunderstanding, however, the result of a joke played on Carlstein by his teammates.
