= Richard Worsley (cricketer) =

English cricketer and army officer (1879–1917)

Personal information
- Full name: Richard Stanley Worsley
- Born: 7 September 1879; Harrington, Lincolnshire, England
- Died: 4 May 1917 (aged 37) at sea aboard SS Transylvania off Bergeggi, Liguria, Italy
- Batting: Unknown

Domestic team information
- Years: Team
- 1903/04: Orange Free State

Career statistics
Competition	First-class
Matches	1
Runs scored	12
Batting average	6.00
100s/50s	–/–
Top score	10
Catches/stumpings	–/–
- Source: Cricinfo, 29 March 2021

Richard Stanley Worsley DSO (7 September 1879 – 4 May 1917) was an English first-class cricketer and British Army officer.

The son of Major General Richard Worsley, he was born at Harrington Hall in Lincolnshire in September 1879. He was educated at Wellington College, before attending the Royal Military College, Sandhurst. Worsley graduated from Sandhurst into the Royal Army Service Corps as a second lieutenant in February 1900. He served in the Second Boer War between 1900 and 1902, receiving the Queen's and King's South Africa Medal, with five clasps, in addition to gaining promotion to lieutenant. He remained in South Africa after the war, playing in a single first-class cricket match in the Currie Cup for Orange Free State against Transvaal at Bloemfontein in 1904. He batted twice in the match and was dismissed for scores of 2 and 10 by Gordon White and George Shepstone respectively. He was promoted to captain in June 1904.

In January 1911, he was seconded for duty as an adjutant with the East Lancashire Divisional Transport and Supply Column. Worsley was seconded for duty with the Egyptian Army in 1913. He served in the First World War and was promoted to major in October 1914. He saw action during the Gallipoli campaign from April to September 1915, prior to taking part in the Anglo-Egyptian Darfur Expedition of 1916. He was mentioned three times in dispatches three times during the war and was made a Companion to the Distinguished Service Order in May 1916. He was mentioned a further two times in dispatches during the Dafur expedition and received a letter of thanks from the Sirdar, Sir Reginald Wingate. Worsley was returning to England to take up a new post aboard the transport ship SS Transylvania off the coast of Bergeggi, which was being escorted by the Japanese ships Matsu and Sakaki. On 4 May 1917, the ship was torpedoed by the German U-boat SM U-63 under the command of Otto Schultze. Despite attempts to evacuate the ship by Matsu, twenty minutes after the first torpedo had hit, U-63 fired a second which hit Transylvania again, causing the ship to rapidly sink. Worsley was one of 412 people killed aboard the ship.
