= Barberton Greenstone Belt =

Ancient granite-greenstone terrane in South Africa

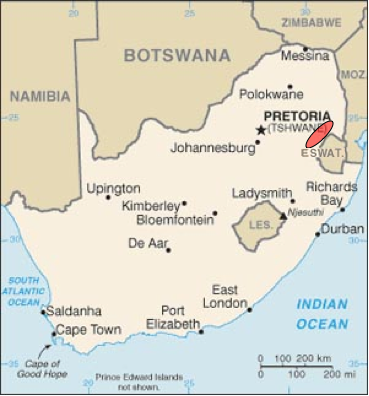
Location of the Barberton Greenstone Belt.

The Barberton Greenstone Belt is a geologic formation situated on the eastern edge of the Kaapvaal craton in South Africa. It is known for its gold mineralisation and for its komatiites, an unusual type of ultramafic volcanic rock named after the Komati River that flows through the belt. Some of the oldest exposed rocks on Earth (greater than 3.6 Ga) are located in the Barberton Greenstone Belt of the Eswatini–Barberton areas and these contain some of the oldest traces of life on Earth, second only to the Isua Greenstone Belt of Western Greenland. The Makhonjwa Mountains make up 40% of the Barberton belt. It is named after the town Barberton, Mpumalanga.

== History and description ==
Simplified map of the greenstone belt.

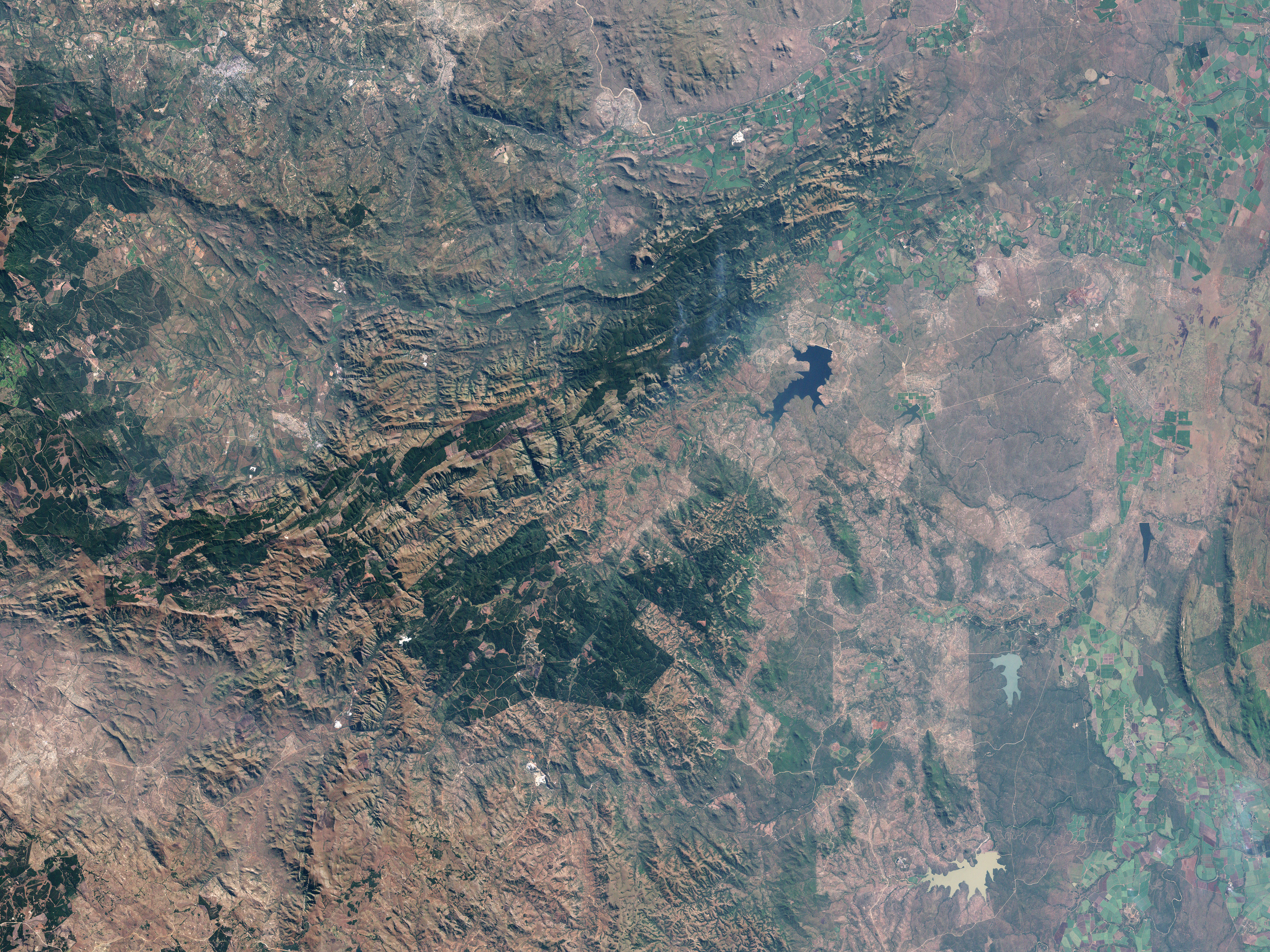
Aerial view from Landsat 7 with the Enhanced Thematic Mapper Plus (ETM+)

The Barberton Greenstone Belt consists of a tonalite-trondhjemite-granodiorite (TTG) suite (emplaced approximately 3.4–3.2 Ga), and the granite–monzogranite–syenite granite (GMS) suite (emplaced approximately 3.2–3.1 Ga). According to a Westraat et al. study in 2005: "The GMS suite in the Barberton granite-greenstone terrane shows very different internal and external characteristics from the earlier TTG suite. Individual plutons may cover several thousand square kilometres and these composite granitoid bodies have traditionally been referred to as batholiths, alluding to their compositionally and texturally heterogeneous nature and enormous areal extent. For the most part, the plutons appear undeformed."

=== Impact events ===
The Barberton Greenstone Belt records impact events in 8 layers containing spherules (tiny spheres which form from condensed vapour created by the impact) dubbed S1 through S8, spanning from about 3.5 to 3.2 billion years ago, which likely represent at least 4 but perhaps as many as 8 or more impact events. The impactors that generated these events are thought to have been much larger than those that created the largest known still existing craters/impact structures on Earth (Vredefort and Chicxulub), with the impactors having an estimated diameter of ~20–50 kilometres (12–31 mi), with the craters generated by these impacts having an estimated diameter of 400–1,000 kilometres (250–620 mi). The Barberton deposits are thought to have been distant from the impacts.

The most powerful of the impacts such as the S2 impact, which dates to 3.26 billion years ago, probably caused extremely strong earthquakes worldwide, megatsunamis thousands of meters high, as well as boiling the surface of the oceans, resulting in tens of meters of global ocean evaporation. Earth would have also been plunged into darkness lasting years to decades.

== Barberton Greenstone Belt TTG and GMS suites ==
According to a study by Yearron et al. (2003):

"The TTGs are typically low- to medium-K, metaluminous I-type granites, Their chondrite-normalised REE patterns show two trends. The majority of plutons are LREE (Note: Low atomic numbered rare earth elements Sc, Y, La, Ce, Pr, Nd, Pm, Sm (Eu))-enriched, HREE (Note: High atomic numbered rare earth elements (Eu) Gd, Tb, Dy, Ho, Er, Tm, Yb, Lu)-depleted and with small or no Eu anomalies, whilst the Steynsdorp and Doornhoek plutons are relatively HREE-undepleted with significant Eu anomalies. Nd isotope analyses show that the 3.4 Ga TTGs have positive εNd values (0 to +3.7), indicative of depleted-mantle sources, similar to the oldest greenstone belt formations (the Onverwacht). In contrast, the 3.2 Ga TTGs have negative εNd, suggesting crustal or enriched-mantle input into the magmas."

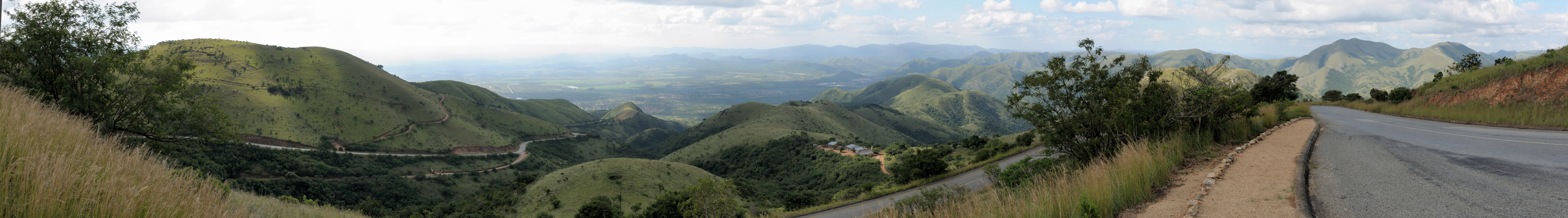
A panoramic photograph of the Makhonjwa Mountains area.

== Hooggenoeg Formation of the Barberton Greenstone Belt ==
According to a dissertation by Louzada (2003): "The upper part of the Hooggenoeg Formation is characterized by ultramafic massive and pillow lavas, a trondhjemitic suite of silicified felsic intrusive and flow banded rocks, and sedimentary chert beds. Veins of felsic, chert and ultramafic material intrude the belt. The depositional environment is thought to be a shoaling shallow sea in which the Hooggenoeg Formation has been deposited in a west-block down, listric faulted, synsedimentary setting."

== IUGS geological heritage site ==
In respect of the research carried out on this 'unique remnant of ancient Earth's crust', the 'Archaean Barberton Greenstone Belt' was included by the International Union of Geological Sciences (IUGS) in its assemblage of 100 'geological heritage sites' around the world in a listing published in October 2022. The organisation defines an 'IUGS Geological Heritage Site' as 'a key place with geological elements and/or processes of international scientific relevance, used as a reference, and/or with a substantial contribution to the development of geological sciences through history.' The outcrops of the Barberton Greenstone Belt had previously been inscribed on UNESCO's list of World Heritage Sites in 2008 as 'Barbeton Makhonjwa Mountains.

Although not a state or national park, it is patrolled by rangers armed with machine guns who accompany expeditions for protection against rhinos and elephants.

== See also ==
- List of impact craters on Earth
- List of possible impact structures on Earth
