= Makhonjwa Mountains =

Range of small mountains and hills in South Africa

- Barberton greenstone belt
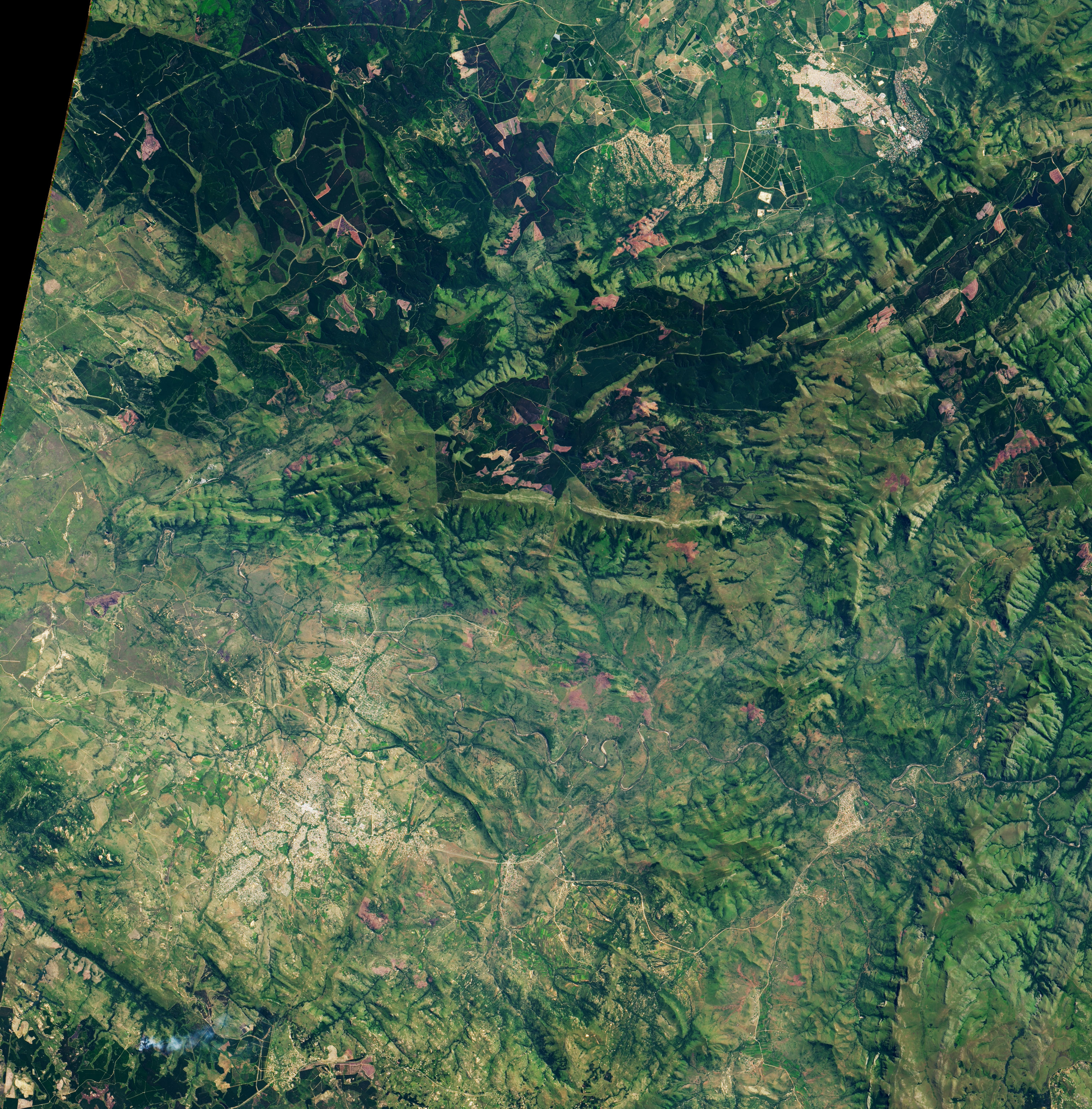
- Barberton Makhonjwa Mountains on 10 March 2021; seen from space with the Operational Land Imager with Landsat 8. The Komati River runs across the centre. Eerstehoek and Elukwatini is in the lower left, with the Makhonjwa Mountains up top.

Highest point
- Elevation: 1,800 m (5,900 ft)

Geography
- Location within South Africa
- Countries: South Africa and Eswatini
- Range coordinates: 25.785°S 31.052°E

UNESCO World Heritage Site
- Official name: Barberton Makhonjwa Mountains
- Type: Natural
- Criteria: (viii)
- Designated: 2018
- Reference no.: 1575
- Region: Africa

The Makhonjwa Mountains or Barberton Makhonjwa Mountains are a range of small mountains and hills that covers an area of 120 by 60 kilometres (75 by 37 mi), about 80% in Mpumalanga, a province of South Africa, and the remainder in neighbouring Eswatini. It constitutes 40% of the Barberton Greenstone Belt.

== Geography ==
The area ranges in altitude from 600 to 1,800 metres (2,000 to 5,900 ft) above mean sea level. It has a number of rocky hills, with moist grassy uplands and forested valleys. The region lies within the Barberton centre of endemism. The mean annual precipitation is 600–1,150 millimetres (24–45 in), with wet summers and dry winters.

== Geology ==
The mountains lie on the eastern edge of the Kaapvaal craton. The range is best known for having some of the oldest exposed rocks on Earth, estimated to be between 3.2 and 3.6 billion years (Ga) old, dating from the Paleoarchean. The mountain range's extreme age and exceptional preservation have yielded some of the oldest undisputed signs of life on Earth and provide insight into the hostile nature of the Precambrian environment under which this life evolved. This has led to the area being otherwise known as the "Genesis of life".

The range is also known for its gold deposits and a number of komatiites, an unusual type of ultramafic volcanic rock named after the Komati River that flows through the belt.

In April 2014, scientists reported finding evidence of the largest terrestrial meteor impact event to date near the area. They estimated the impact occurred about 3.26 billion years ago and that the impactor was approximately between 37 and 58 kilometers (23 and 36 miles) wide. The crater from this event, if it still exists, has not yet been found. In May 2019, extraterrestrial organic materials in 3.3-billion-year-old volcanic rocks was found at the Makhonjwa Mountains.

== History ==
Swazis and other pastoral peoples probably grazed their livestock there, but not in large numbers, until the arrival of European settlers in the 1860s. Gold was discovered near Kaapsehoop in 1875, but it was the find by George Barber and his cousins Fred and Harry Barber that triggered a gold rush in 1884, leading to the founding of the town of Barberton. It was later overshadowed by the 1886 Witwatersrand Gold Rush.

Economically speaking, mining is declining, and the main activities are now timber harvesting and grazing. Commercial plantations grow pine and eucalyptus.

In 2009, a submission was made for the region's classification as a World Heritage Site. The location became a World Heritage Site in 2018.
