= Christiaan Papenfus =

South African cricketer and South African Army soldier

Personal information
- Full name: Christiaan Frederick Beyers Papenfus
- Born: 10 December 1915; Barberton, Transvaal, South Africa
- Died: 18 November 1941 (aged 25); Gazala, Italian Libya

Domestic team information
- Years: Team
- 1936/37–1939/40: Orange Free State

Career statistics
Competition	First-class
Matches	5
Runs scored	81
Batting average	13.50
100s/50s	0/1
Top score	60
Balls bowled	1,123
Wickets	25
Bowling average	19.88
5 wickets in innings	2
10 wickets in match	0
Best bowling	6/88
Catches/stumpings	3/–
- Source: Cricinfo, 12 June 2022

Christiaan Frederick Beyers Papenfus (10 December 1915 – 18 November 1941) was a South African first-class cricketer and South African Air Force pilot.

Papenfus was born at Barberton in November 1915. He made his debut in first-class cricket for Orange Free State against Natal at Bloemfontein in the 1936–37 Currie Cup. He made four further first-class appearances for Orange Free State, the last of which came in February 1940. Papenfus met with success in his five matches, taking 25 wickets at an average of 19.88. He took two five wicket hauls, the first of which came in his third first-class match against Border when he took figures of 5 for 39; despite this, Orange Free State lost the match by 191 runs. In his final first-class appearance against North Eastern Transvaal, he took 6 for 88, and recorded his only first-class half-century with a score of 60 batting at number ten; Orange Free State lost this match by 83 runs. Wisden noted that despite this innings, he was "normally of little account as a batsman".

Papenfus served as a sergeant in the South African Air Force during the Second World War. Attached to 21 Squadron, he served as crew on Maryland bombers. 21 Squadron was tasked with attacking German and Italian bases as part of the North African campaign. He was killed in action over Gazala in Italian Libya on 18 November 1941, when his bomber was shot down by the Regia Aeronautica. He was buried in the Knightsbridge War Cemetery.
