= Joseph Abell =

South African cricketer (1891–1962)

Personal information
- Full name: Joseph Goodison Abell
- Born: 12 April 1891; Wakefield, Yorkshire, England
- Died: 1 February 1962 (aged 70); East London, Cape Province, South Africa

Domestic team information
- Years: Team
- 1920–21 to 1925–26: Orange Free State

Career statistics
Competition	First class
Matches	4
Runs scored	25
Batting average	5
100s/50s	0/0
Top score	16
Balls bowled	450
Wickets	10
Bowling average	24.10
5 wickets in innings	0
10 wickets in match	0
Best bowling	3/59
Catches/stumpings	3/0
- Source: CricketArchive, 25 June 2016

Joseph Abell (12 April 1891 – 1 February 1962) was a South African cricketer who played for Orange Free State in first-class cricket from 1921 to 1926.
