= Norman Riley (rugby union) =

South African rugby union player and cricketer

- Full name: Norman Michael Riley
- Born: 25 February 1939 Springs, Transvaal, South Africa
- Died: 6 December 2014 (aged 75) Shelley Beach, KwaZulu-Natal, South Africa

Rugby union career
- Position: Fly–half
International career
Years	Team	Apps	(Points)
1963	South Africa	1	(0)

Norman Michael Riley (25 February 1939 – 6 December 2014) was a South African international rugby union player.

Riley was born in Springs, Transvaal, and educated at Hoërskool John Vorster.

An attacking fly–half, Riley represented both Eastern Transvaal and the Junior Springboks against the touring 1963 Wallabies, prior to his call up for the third of four international fixtures between them and the Springboks. He was amongst eight changes to the team for Ellis Park, following their loss at Newlands, and took the place of the dropped Keith Oxlee. The new additions weren't enough to prevent a second consecutive loss and selectors returned to Oxlee for the final fixture. He spent much of his career with the Nigel Rugby Club.

Riley was an all–round sportsperson. He played first-class cricket as a bowler for both North Eastern Transvaal and Orange Free State, while also being a provincial level field hockey player.

== See also ==
- List of South Africa national rugby union players
