= Leslie Wenzler =

South African cricketer

Personal information
- Full name: Leslie Justin Wenzler
- Born: 5 July 1962 (age 64); Johannesburg, Transvaal, South Africa
- Batting: Right-handed
- Bowling: Right-arm medium

Domestic team information
- Years: Team
- 1981/82–1991/92: Orange Free State
- 1982/83–1985/86: Northern Transvaal B
- 1984: Cheshire
- 1990/91–1991/92: Orange Free State B

Career statistics
Competition	First-class	List A
Matches	21	5
Runs scored	592	38
Batting average	18.50	9.50
100s/50s	–/–	–/–
Top score	37	17
Balls bowled	764	42
Wickets	4	0
Bowling average	109.00	–
5 wickets in innings	–	–
10 wickets in match	–	–
Best bowling	1/2	–
Catches/stumpings	16/–	2/–
- Source: Cricinfo, 27 February 2019

Leslie Justin Wenzler (born 5 July 1962) is a South African former first-class cricketer.

Born at Johannesburg, Wenzler made his debut in first-class cricket for Orange Free State against Griqualand West at Bloemfontein in the 1981/82 SAB Bowl. He made his debut in List A one-day cricket in the same season, against Western Province in the Datsun Shield, with Wenzler playing a second match in the competition against Natal. He played first-class for Northern Transvaal B in the 1982/83 SAB Bowl, before travelling to England to play minor counties cricket for Cheshire in 1984, making two appearances in the Minor Counties Championship, alongside two appearances in the MCCA Knockout Trophy. Returning to South Africa, he continued to play first-class cricket for Orange Free State (and their B side) and Northern Transvaal B until the 1991/92 season. In List A cricket, Wenzler appeared in two matches for an Orange Free State and Griqualand West Combined XI in the 1986/87 Nissan Shield, before playing a final match in that format for Orange Free State in the 1987/88 Nissan Shield. Playing a total of 21 first-class matches, Wenzler scored 592 runs at an average of 18.50, with a high score of 37. With his right-arm medium pace bowling, Wenzler took 4 wickets at 109.00 apiece. In five List A matches, he scored 38 runs, with a high score of 17.

In 2002, Wenzler was a founding member of the Western Province Cricket Coaches Association.
