= Clive Richardson =

South African cricketer

Personal information
- Born: 3 November 1932 (age 94); Bloemfontein, Orange Free State, South Africa
- Batting: Right-handed
- Role: Batsman

Domestic team information
- Years: Team
- 1950–51 to 1964–65: Orange Free State

Career statistics
Competition	First-class
Matches	54
Runs scored	3312
Batting average	35.23
100s/50s	8/13
Top score	258
Balls bowled	25
Wickets	1
Bowling average	42.00
5 wickets in innings	0
10 wickets in match	0
Best bowling	1/38
Catches/stumpings	25/0
- Source: Cricinfo, 28 March 2018

Clive Richardson (born 3 November 1932) is a former cricketer who played first-class cricket for Orange Free State in South Africa from 1950 to 1965.

A right-handed opening batsman, Clive Richardson played his first matches for Orange Free State in the 1950–51 season, but did not establish himself in the team until 1954–55. He was then a fixture in the team until the end of the 1962–63 season.

He was usually one of the most reliable batsmen in one of the weaker Currie Cup teams at the time. He also captained Orange Free State from 1957–58 to 1961–62. Against Transvaal B in 1959–60 he scored 258, a record score for Orange Free State; he and Des Schonegevel added 280 for the third wicket, setting a Currie Cup third-wicket record.
