= Thomas Fraser (South African cricketer) =

South African cricketer (1912–1995)

Personal information
- Full name: Thomas William Fraser
- Born: 26 June 1912; Natal, South Africa
- Died: 25 July 1995 (aged 83); Taunton, England
- Batting: Right-handed
- Bowling: Slow left-arm orthodox

Domestic team information
- Years: Team
- 1936–1937: Cambridge University
- 1937/38–1946/47: Orange Free State

Career statistics
| Competition | First-class |
|---|---|
| Matches | 22 |
| Runs scored | 249 |
| Batting average | 9.57 |
| 100s/50s | 0/1 |
| Top score | 61* |
| Balls bowled | 4,062 |
| Wickets | 58 |
| Bowling average | 31.62 |
| 5 wickets in innings | 3 |
| 10 wickets in match | 0 |
| Best bowling | 8/71 |
| Catches/stumpings | 11/– |
- Source: ESPNcricinfo, 30 April 2023

Thomas William Fraser (26 June 1912 – 25 July 1995) was a South African cricketer. He played first-class cricket for Cambridge University and Orange Free State between 1936 and 1948.

A slow left-arm orthodox spin bowler, Fraser's best first-class figures were 8 for 71 for Orange Free State against Eastern Province in January 1940. His best figures in two seasons with Cambridge University, while he was studying at Pembroke College, were 5 for 51 against the touring New Zealanders in 1937.
