= Hamish Miller =

South African cricketer (1941–1997)

Cricket information
- Batting: Right-handed
- Bowling: Right-arm medium-fast

Career statistics
Competition	First-class	List A
Matches	38	4
Runs scored	589	16
Batting average	11.54	8.00
100s/50s	0/1	0/0
Top score	81	13*
Balls bowled	5,296	240
Wickets	76	1
Bowling average	28.94	166.00
5 wickets in innings	1	0
10 wickets in match	0	0
Best bowling	7/48	1/31
Catches/stumpings	23/–	1/–
- Source: CricketArchive, 5 December 2022

Hamish David Sneddon Miller (June 26, 1941 – April 24, 1997) was a South African first-class cricketer who played for Western Province and Free State in South Africa and Glamorgan in English county cricket.

A University of Wales student, Miller's highest score of 81 came against Gloucestershire at Cheltenham in 1964 and his best bowling figures of 7/48 against Nottinghamshire at Trent Bridge, also in 1964. He finished his career in South Africa with Orange Free State.

In 1997 he died on a flight from Albuquerque to Salt Lake City in the United States of America.
