= Percy Bell =

English cricketer

Personal information
- Born: 26 July 1892; Headington, Oxfordshire
- Died: 4 February 1956 (aged 63); Durban, South Africa
- Batting: Right-handed

Domestic team information
- Years: Team
- 1911–1912: Gloucestershire
- 1912/13: Orange Free State
- Source: Cricinfo, 25 July 2022

Percy Bell (26 July 1892 – 4 February 1956) was an English cricketer. He played for Gloucestershire in 1911 and 1912, before moving to South Africa, playing in the Currie Cup for Orange Free State in the 1912/13 season.
