= Anna de Villiers =

- Born: Anna Johanna Dorothea de Villiers; 24 December 1900; Stellenbosch, Cape Colony
- Died: 1 November 1975; Stellenbosch, South Africa
- Education: University of Stellenbosch (B.A., M.A.)
- Occupations: Writer, lexicographer, and educator

Anna Johanna Dorothea de Villiers (24 December 1900 – 1 November 1979) was an Afrikaans South African writer, lexicographer, and educator from South Africa. She is best known for her contributions to Die Afrikaanse woordeboek and Woordeboek van die Afrikaanse Taal. After receiving her doctorate, she taught at the Technical College in Pretoria.

Additionally, Villiers published a number of novels including:

- Sterker as die noodlot (1930)
- Die wit kraai (1938)
- Hercule de Pres (1947)
- Purper daeraad (1958)
- Die Storm Trek verby (1958)

She received an honorary doctorate from the University of London in 1948.
