= Umjindi Local Municipality =

Coordinates: 25°45′S 31°0′E

Umjindi
- Local municipality
- Seal

- Location in Mpumalanga
- Country: South Africa
- Province: Mpumalanga
- District: Ehlanzeni
- Seat: Barberton
- Wards: 9

Government
  - Type: Municipal council
  - Mayor: Lazarus Mashaba

Area
  - Total: 1,745 km^{2} (674 sq mi)

Population (2011)
  - Total: 69,577
  - Density: 39.87/km^{2} (103.3/sq mi)

Racial makeup (2011)
  - Black African: 87.5%
  - Coloured: 1.9%
  - Indian/Asian: 1.0%
  - White: 9.4%

First languages (2011)
  - Swazi: 77.0%
  - Afrikaans: 9.0%
  - English: 5.7%
  - Tsonga: 3.2%
  - Other: 5.1%
- Time zone: UTC+2 (SAST)
- Municipal code: MP323

Umjindi was a local municipality of the Ehlanzeni District in Mpumalanga, South Africa. Barberton was the seat of the municipality. The municipality had a population of 53,744 according to the 2001 census.

== Main places ==
The 2001 census divided the municipality into the following main places:

Place	Code	Area (km^{2})	Population	Most spoken language
Barberton	81601	10.58	9,078	Swazi
Bonanza Gold Mine	81602	5.99	1,340	Swazi
eMjindini	81603	7.91	23,839	Swazi
Fairview Mine	81604	7.52	199	Afrikaans
Sheba Mine	81605	8.45	449	Swazi
Verulum	81607	0.86	1,124	Swazi
Remainder of the municipality	81606	1,699.91	17,721	Swazi

== Politics ==
The municipal council consists of eighteen members elected by mixed-member proportional representation. Nine councillors are elected by first-past-the-post voting in nine wards, while the remaining nine are chosen from party lists so that the total number of party representatives is proportional to the number of votes received. In the election of 18 May 2011 the African National Congress (ANC) won a majority of fifteen seats on the council. The following table shows the results of the election.

Party	Votes				Seats		
Party	Ward	List	Total	%	Ward	List	Total
ANC	13,704	13,804	27,508	83.1	8	7	15
DA	2,490	2,444	4,934	14.9	1	2	3
PAC	281	207	488	1.5	0	0	0
COPE	58	96	154	0.5	0	0	0
Total	16,533	16,551	33,084	100.0	9	9	18
Spoilt votes	185	151	336				

This municipality was dissolved on 3 August 2016 and annexed by the Mbombela Local Municipality.
