= Sarah Wilhelmina Wenzler =

American painter

Sarah Wilhelmina Wenzler (active 1861 – 1872) was an American painter of still lifes.

Little is known of Wenzler's life or career. She is known to have exhibited her still-life paintings at the National Academy of Design, the Boston Athenaeum, and the Pennsylvania Academy of the Fine Arts throughout the 1860s, and she is recorded as having lived in New York City; She is known to have specialized in depictions of hanging bunches of grapes. One of these, Hanging Bunch of Grapes, an oil on canvas of 1867, is owned by the National Gallery of Art; it is signed "S. W. Wenzler". Another of this painter's pieces, "Peaches and Pears on a Wooden Ledge", closed at Christie's on December 3, 2009 for $4780. Few other paintings by Wenzler are known, and little else of her biography has been traced.
