= Des Schonegevel =

South African cricketer (1934–2021)

Personal information
- Full name: Desmond John Schonegevel
- Born: 9 October 1934; Bloemfontein, Orange Free State, South Africa
- Died: 6 July 2021 (aged 86); Kimberley, Northern Cape, South Africa
- Batting: Right-handed
- Bowling: Right-arm off-spin

Domestic team information
- Years: Team
- 1954–55 to 1964–65: Orange Free State
- 1965–66 to 1975–76: Griqualand West

Career statistics
Competition	FC	List A
Matches	100	6
Runs scored	5168	113
Batting average	31.51	22.60
100s/50s	10/23	0/0
Top score	151	41
Balls bowled	8885	162
Wickets	118	2
Bowling average	29.34	64.50
5 wickets in innings	3	0
10 wickets in match	0	n/a
Best bowling	6/29	1/28
Catches/stumpings	76/–	1/–
- Source: Cricinfo, 16 August 2017

Desmond John Schonegevel (9 October 1934 – 6 July 2021) was a South African cricketer who played 100 matches of first-class cricket in South Africa between 1954 and 1977.

== Cricket career ==
=== For Orange Free State ===
A solid middle-order batsman and off-spin bowler, Des Schonegevel made his first-class debut for Orange Free State in the 1954–55 season and played regularly for Orange Free State until the end of the 1964–65 season. His highest score for Orange Free State was 151 against Border in 1963–64, made in a little over six hours, and his best figures were 6 for 103 against Griqualand West in 1958–59. He captained Orange Free State from 1962–63 to 1964–65. Against Transvaal B in 1959–60 he scored 115, adding 280 for the third wicket with his captain, Clive Richardson, and setting a Currie Cup third-wicket record.

=== For Griqualand West ===
Schonegevel moved to Kimberley in 1965 and played for Griqualand West from 1965–66 until 1975–76, captaining them in 1968–69. In his third match for Griqualand West he top-scored in each innings with 79 not out and 138 not out against Natal B; in the second innings he and the number 11 batsman put on an unbroken partnership of 87 to avoid defeat.

In 1966–67 his 112 against Orange Free State helped Griqualand West achieve their first victory since 1959–60. Against the Australians in 1969–70 he top-scored in each innings, scoring 49 and 85, defying the Australian spin bowlers "with dour concentration", but this time Griqualand West lost by an innings.

His highest score for Griqualand West was 138 not out against Natal B, as above, and his best bowling figures were 6 for 29 against Border in 1967–68.

=== Administration ===
After he retired from playing, Schonegevel became a prominent coach and administrator in Griqualand West/Northern Cape. He was the first chairperson of Griqualand West Cricket after unity in 1991, and led the unity process in the region, under which all the racially-separate cricket organisations became one.

== Business career ==
Schonegevel co-founded Desnics Planet Sport, a sporting goods business, in Kimberley in the 1960s, and continued to manage or co-manage the business until his retirement. He died in Kimberley in July 2021, aged 86.
