= Rayno Arendse =

South African cricketer (born 1978)

Personal information
- Full name: Rayno Garth Arendse
- Born: 8 December 1978 (age 47); Worcester, South Africa
- Batting: Right-handed
- Bowling: Right-arm medium pace

Domestic team information
- Years: Team
- 1998: Boland
- 2001–2004: Free State
- 2004–2010: Boland
- First-class debut: 14 March 1998 Boland v Sri Lankans
- Last First-class: 22 October 2009 Boland v Free State
- List A debut: 21 December 2001 Boland v Griqualand West
- Last List A: 25 October 2009 Boland v Free State

Career statistics
Competition	First-class	List A
Matches	44	37
Runs scored	1,533	651
Batting average	22.88	29.59
100s/50s	0/8	0/3
Top score	95	74
Balls bowled	6	0
Wickets	0	-
Bowling average	-	-
5 wickets in innings	-	-
10 wickets in match	-	-
Best bowling	0–15	-
Catches/stumpings	35/–	11/–
- Source: CricketArchive, 4 April 2012

Rayno Garth Arendse (born 8 December 1978) is a South African cricketer who played for Boland and Free State. A right-handed batsman and right-arm medium pace bowler, he made his first-class debut for Boland on 14 March 1998 against a Sri Lankan representative team. He joined Free State in 2001 and spent three seasons with the province before returning to Boland, where he played until 2010.

Arendse also played club cricket for several English sides, assisting Topcroft, Cromer, Vauxhall Mallards and Scarborough.
