= Neville Lindsay =

South African cricketer (1886–1976)

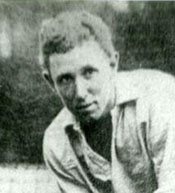

Personal information
- Born: 30 July 1886; Harrismith, Orange Free State
- Died: 2 February 1976 (aged 89); Pietermaritzburg, Natal, South Africa
- Batting: Right-handed
- Relatives: Johnny Lindsay (nephew); Denis Lindsay (great-nephew)

International information
- National side: South Africa
- Only Test: 12 November 1921 v Australia

Domestic team information
- Years: Team
- 1906/07–1926/27: Transvaal
- 1912/13–1913/14: Orange Free State

Career statistics
Competition	Test	First-class
Matches	1	42
Runs scored	35	2,030
Batting average	17.50	33.27
100s/50s	0/0	5/11
Top score	29	160*
Balls bowled	–	895
Wickets	–	24
Bowling average	–	27.83
5 wickets in innings	–	0
10 wickets in match	–	0
Best bowling	–	4/27
Catches/stumpings	1/–	16/–
- Source: Cricinfo, 11 August 2021

Neville Vernon Lindsay (30 July 1886 – 2 February 1976) was a South African cricketer who played in one Test in 1921–22. He was born in Harrismith, Orange Free State, and died in Pietermaritzburg, Natal.
