= William Strydom =

South African cricketer (1942–1995)

Personal information
- Full name: William Thomas Strydom
- Born: 21 March 1942; Bloemfontein, Orange Free State, South Africa
- Died: 20 February 1995 (aged 52); Pietermaritzburg, KwaZulu-Natal, South Africa
- Batting: Right-handed
- Bowling: Right-arm medium
- Relatives: Steve Strydom (brother)

Career statistics
Competition	First-class	List A
Matches	80	8
Runs scored	1322	66
Batting average	12.96	13.20
100s/50s	0/1	0/0
Top score	62*	29
Balls bowled	12539	435
Wickets	174	8
Bowling average	34.25	33.50
5 wickets in innings	2	0
10 wickets in match	0	N/A
Best bowling	5-52	3-76
Catches/stumpings	36/0	3/0
- Source: CricketArchive

William Thomas Strydom (21 March 1942 – 20 February 1995) was a South African first-class cricketer who played with Orange Free State in the Currie Cup from 1961 to 1981.

A right-arm medium pace bowler, Strydom was one of four brothers to play first-class cricket for Orange Free State. He had his best season in 1976–77 when he took 29 wickets at 22.75. This led to his selection as one of the winners of the South African Cricket Annual Cricketer of the Year award in 1977. His best first-class figures were 5 for 52 against Griqualand West in 1978–79.

Strydom was shot and killed in 1995 during a robbery at his business premises at Pietermaritzburg.

== See also ==
- List of cricketers who were murdered
