= Steve Strydom =

South African cricketer (1938–2005)

Personal information
- Full name: Stefanus Strydom
- Born: 26 March 1938; Bloemfontein, Orange Free State, South Africa
- Died: 29 October 2005 (aged 67); Welgemoed, Bellville, Western Cape, South Africa
- Batting: Right-handed
- Bowling: Right-arm medium
- Relatives: William Strydom (brother)

Domestic team information
- Years: Team
- 1959/60–1968/69: Orange Free State

Career statistics
Competition	First-class
Matches	28
Runs scored	1,227
Batting average	24.05
100s/50s	1/5
Top score	234
Balls bowled	486
Wickets	5
Bowling average	58.00
5 wickets in innings	0
10 wickets in match	0
Best bowling	2/33
Catches/stumpings	23/–
- Source: Cricinfo, 27 April 2024

Stefanus Strydom (26 March 1938 – 29 October 2005) was a South African cricketer who played first-class cricket for Orange Free State between 1959–60 and 1968–69.

Strydom, one of four brothers to play first-class cricket, was a middle-order batsman and occasional medium-pace bowler. He had one outstanding match, for Orange Free State against Transvaal B in 1965–66, when he scored 97 in the first innings and 234 when Orange Free State followed on. On the second day he scored 97 and 120 not out. The match ended in a draw. He was chosen as one of the South African Cricket Annual Cricketers of the Year in 1966.

Strydom also represented Orange Free State at rugby union, and in the 1970s and 1980s he was an international rugby union referee.
