= Shunter Coen =

South African cricketer

Cricket information
- Batting: Right-handed
- Bowling: Right-arm

International information
- National side: South Africa
- Test debut: 24 December 1927 v England
- Last Test: 4 February 1928 v England

Career statistics
Competition	Test	First-class
Matches	2	51
Runs scored	101	2,808
Batting average	50.50	32.65
100s/50s	0/0	6/14
Top score	41*	173
Balls bowled	12	1,881
Wickets	0	22
Bowling average	–	49.40
5 wickets in innings	–	0
10 wickets in match	–	0
Best bowling	–	4/92
Catches/stumpings	1/–	22/–
- Source: Cricinfo, 14 November 2022

Stanley Keppel "Shunter" Coen (14 October 1902 – 28 January 1967) was a South African cricketer who played in two Test matches in 1927–28. He was born in Heilbron, Orange Free State, and died in Durban, Natal.

== First-class cricket ==
Coen was a right-handed middle-order or opening batsman and a right-arm occasional bowler, Coen had a long career in South African domestic cricket from 1921–22 to 1938–39, but made a particular impact in only two seasons. Across the 1920s, Coen's first-class cricket was for Orange Free State, usually one of the weaker South African domestic sides; he did little for them in his first three seasons, but in 1924–25, he made 60 in the match against an even weaker Griqualand West team. He then followed this, in his only other first-class match of the season, with 103 against a team of English Test and county players on an unofficial tour organised by the South African entrepreneur S. B. Joel.

Coen had an indifferent season in 1925–26, but in 1926–27 he suddenly emerged as one of the top cricketers in South Africa, with 737 runs in the season at an average of 73.70 and, having previously not taken a single wicket, 14 wickets as well. The runs and wickets came not just against the weaker sides: in the match against Transvaal, he took four wickets for 92 runs in Transvaal's first innings and then, when Orange Free State had been set an unlikely 559 to win, he made 172 in the second innings, so the game was lost by only 111 runs. The following match, against Natal he was promoted to open the innings and made 165, putting on 305 for the second wicket with Mick Commaille; this was then somewhat overshadowed by a first-wicket partnership of 424 for Natal, but it remains the highest second-wicket partnership in first-class cricket for Orange Free State. There was more to come in the next match. Coen made 87 in the first innings of the game against Eastern Province and then, again in partnership with Commaille, he hit 132 out of an unbroken first-wicket stand of 236 which also remains as an Orange Free State/Free State record and which won the match.

== Test cricket ==
An England team toured South Africa in 1927–28 and Coen, despite failure in the Orange Free State match against the touring side, was called up for Test duty. Before the first Test, however, he played one match for the touring team: MCC was one player short for the first-class two-day match against a South African XI and Coen filled the vacancy, scoring just three in his only innings. The first Test was not a success for South Africa, which lost the match by 10 wickets, but although he sustained an ankle injury in the game, Coen's reputation was not much damaged. In the first innings, batting at No 7, he made only seven, and he was able to bowl only two overs, not taking any wickets. But in South Africa's second innings, he batted at No 10 because of his injury; he came in to bat with the score at 78 for eight, still 39 runs short of avoiding an innings defeat, and he and Cyril Vincent put on 80 for the ninth wicket, a record at the time for Tests against England, and when the innings ended he was 41 not out. The Times reported that "[England] captain Stanyforth tried Stevens, Hammond, Peebles, Geary and Astill in turn, but the South African batsmen played all the bowling on its merits, never hesitating to score off a loose ball."

The ankle injury kept Coen out of the next match and he was not recalled to the Test team until the final match of the series, which South African won to square the rubber. In this game, Coen opened the innings with Herby Taylor and scored 28 in the first innings and an unbeaten 25 in the second when South Africa, set just 69, won the game by eight wickets. With two not-outs in his four Test innings, Coen topped the South African batting averages for the series, and his average of 50.50 was higher than his highest score, which was only 41 not out.

== Later cricket career ==
After this promising start, Coen might have been expected to have a substantial Test career. Instead, in 1928–29 he lost form and made only 64 runs in six innings, which meant he was not picked for the 1929 South African tour to England. He did not play at all in 1929–30 and then in 1930–31 he started playing for Western Province; initially, he had little success, and he was not picked for the next South African Test tour, the 1931–32 tour to Australia and New Zealand. Ironically, while the tour was taking place, Coen had a second season in which he excelled with the bat, making 630 runs at an average of 63. Among his innings in this season was one of 173, his highest, against Transvaal.

At the end of the 1931–32 season, Coen transferred to Transvaal, but he was unable to reproduce his earlier form and in nine games across the next four seasons he passed 50 only twice. He moved again in 1937–38 to play three matches for Border and then returned for a single game to Orange Free State in 1938–39.
