= Louis de Villiers =

South African cricketer (1908–1970)

Personal information
- Full name: Louis Ewald de Villiers
- Born: 27 September 1908; Pretoria, Transvaal Colony, South Africa
- Died: 10 February 1970 (aged 61); Glenashley, Durban, Natal, South Africa
- Batting: Right-handed
- Bowling: Right-arm off-spin

Domestic team information
- Years: Team
- 1924/25–1933/34: Orange Free State

Career statistics
Competition	First-class
Matches	25
Runs scored	360
Batting average	10.28
100s/50s	0/0
Top score	46
Balls bowled	5,001
Wickets	118
Bowling average	18.34
5 wickets in innings	13
10 wickets in match	3
Best bowling	7/30
Catches/stumpings	24/–
- Source: Cricinfo, 12 March 2023

Louis Ewald de Villiers (27 September 1908 – 10 February 1970) was a South African cricketer. He played in 23 first-class matches for Orange Free State between 1924 and 1934.

De Villiers was an off-spin bowler. After playing six matches in his first five seasons with moderate results, he had a successful season in 1929–30, taking 24 wickets at an average of 15.57. In the Currie Cup, he took 6 for 28 and 5 for 47 in Orange Free State's innings victory over Eastern Province, and a week later he took 7 for 65 in Western Province's first innings. In nine days he took 19 wickets, with overall figures of 82.3–31–168–19.

In the 1931–32 Currie Cup, de Villiers and the Test player Buster Nupen were the outstanding bowlers, Nupen with 43 wickets at an average of 10.09, de Villiers with 42 wickets at 11.30. In Orange Free State's opening match de Villiers took six wickets in each innings against Rhodesia, who nevertheless won by a large margin. In the final match he took 7 for 30 and 5 for 55 to bowl Orange Free State to victory over Border.
