= Dirkie de Villiers =

South African cricketer and rugby union player

Personal information
- Full name: Dirk Isaac de Villiers
- Born: 20 July 1889; Wellington, Cape Province, South Africa
- Died: 1 October 1958 (aged 69); Cape Town, Cape Province, South Africa

Domestic team information
- Years: Team
- 1912/13: Western Province
- 1920/21–1924/25: Orange Free State

Career statistics
| Competition | First-class |
|---|---|
| Matches | 20 |
| Runs scored | 1,364 |
| Batting average | 41.33 |
| 100s/50s | 3/7 |
| Top score | 200* |
| Balls bowled | 1,727 |
| Wickets | 29 |
| Bowling average | 32.79 |
| 5 wickets in innings | 1 |
| 10 wickets in match | 0 |
| Best bowling | 5/44 |
| Catches/stumpings | 18/– |
- Source: CricketArchive, 13 July 2025

Dirk Isaac de Villiers (20 July 1889 – 1 October 1958) was a South African rugby union international and first-class cricketer active in the 1910s and 1920s. He was a lawyer by profession.

== Biography ==
Born into a musical family in Wellington, de Villiers is the son of music institute founders Dirk and Tina de Villiers. His elder brother, the Reverend Marthinus Lourens de Villiers, composed Die Stem van Suid-Afrika, which used to be the national anthem of South Africa. Dirkie himself was said to be an accomplished violinist.

A Cambridge-educated lawyer, de Villiers gained blues in rugby and was capped in three Test matches for the Springboks as a centre in the 1910 British Lions tour, scoring a try on debut. As a cricketer, de Villiers was an all-rounder and played at first-class level for Western Province and Orange Free State, the latter after the war. His best score of 200 not out, against Border in the 1923–24 season, was a then record for Orange Free State.

== See also ==
- List of South Africa national rugby union players
