= Francois Haasbroek =

South African cricketer (born 1987)

Personal information
- Full name: Daniel Francois Haasbroek
- Born: 26 August 1987 (age 39); Piet Retief, South Africa
- Batting: Right-handed
- Bowling: Right-arm medium

Domestic team information
- Years: Team
- 2010/11: Free State
- 2011/12–: North West
- First-class debut: 30 September 2010 Free State v Easterns
- List A debut: 3 October 2010 Free State v Easterns

Career statistics
Competition	First-class	List A
Matches	11	10
Runs scored	290	67
Batting average	32.22	16.75
100s/50s	0/2	0/0
Top score	68	32
Balls bowled	1319	366
Wickets	31	9
Bowling average	19.54	27.55
5 wickets in innings	2	0
10 wickets in match	0	0
Best bowling	5–31	4–20
Catches/stumpings	12/–	1/–
- Source: CricketArchive, 31 March 2012

Daniel Francois Haasbroek (born 26 August 1987) is a former South African professional cricketer who has represented the Free State and North West provincial teams in first-class and List A cricket.

Haasbroek has also played club cricket in England; he assisted Northern in the Liverpool Premier League in 2006 and 2007, and joined Lancashire League team Lowerhouse as the club professional in 2011 until 2013. During these 3 seasons, Lowerhouse won 2 Lancashire League titles, and were runners-up in 2013. The Club also won the Worsley Cup in 2012. In the 2014 season, he played for Finchley in the Middlesex Premier League, followed by a two year spell as Professional for Euxton, in the Ribblesdale League. He settled permanently in Lancashire, marrying a Burnley girl in 2017. He is currently Director of Cricket at Stonyhurst College. Under Lancashire League rules, he was able to regain his " amateur " status in 2018, and has represented Lowerhouse since then, helping them to three more Worsley Cups in 2018, 2021 & 2024.
