= Robert Gouldie =

South African cricketer

Personal information
- Born: 13 April 1905; Kimberley, Cape Colony
- Died: 17 December 1968 (aged 63); Durban, South Africa
- Source: Cricinfo, 17 December 2020

Robert Gouldie (13 April 1905 – 17 December 1968) was a South African cricketer. He played in six first-class matches from 1927/28 to 1939/40.
