= Ramblers Cricket Club Ground =

Cricket ground

Coordinates: 29°06′42″S 26°13′11″E

- Interactive map of Ramblers Cricket Club Ground

Ground information
- Location: Bloemfontein, Free State
- Country: South Africa
- Establishment: c1891

Team information
Orange Free State	(1891 – 1986)
- As of 13 November 2009; Source: CricketArchive

Ramblers Cricket Club Ground is a cricket ground in Bloemfontein, Free State, South Africa, on the north side of Zastron Street.

The first recorded match on the ground was in 1892, when an Orange Free State XXII played the touring WW Read's XI. It served as Orange Free State's main home ground from 1904 to 1986. There were 146 first-class matches there and 16 List A matches.
