= 2011 Under-19 Cricket World Cup Qualifier =

International cricket tournament

2011 ICC Under-19 Cricket World Cup Qualifier
- Administrator: International Cricket Council
- Cricket format: One Day International
- Tournament format: Round-robin
- Host: Ireland
- Champions: Scotland (1st title)
- Participants: 10
- Most runs: (Papua New Guinea) Christopher Kent (474)
- Most wickets: (Canada) Manny Aulakh (21) (Nepal) Rahul Vishwakarma (21)

The 2011 ICC Under-19 Cricket World Cup Qualifier was an event organised by the International Cricket Council in Ireland in July 2011. Ten participants competed for the six remaining places in the 2012 ICC Under-19 Cricket World Cup.

== Teams ==
Two teams from each of the five ICC regions enter the World Cup Qualifier. All ten teams have been determined through regional tournaments.

- Namibia (2010 Africa U-19 Championships)
- Kenya (2010 Africa U-19 Championships)
- Scotland (2010 European U-19 Division One)
- Ireland (2010 European U-19 Division One)
- Afghanistan (2011 ACC U-19 Elite Cup Champion)
- Nepal (2011 ACC U-19 Elite Cup Runner Up)
- Papua New Guinea (2011 East Asia Pacific Under 19 Championship)
- Vanuatu (2011 East Asia Pacific Under 19 Championship)
- United States (2011 Americas Under 19 Division 1)
- Canada (2011 Americas Under 19 Division 1)

== Matches ==
All the matches of the tournament played in Ireland. Here is the list of matches that were played during the tournament.

28 July 2011
Scorecard

Afghanistan; 112 (38.5 overs)	v	Nepal; 154 (44.3 overs)
Hashmatullah Shaidi 29 (66); Rahul Vishwakarma 5/23 (7.5 overs)		Subash Khakurel 54 (92); Abdul Naseri 2/7 (5.3 overs)

Nepal Under-19s won by 42 runs
Observatory Lane, Rathmines, Dublin
Umpires: Niels Bagh (Denmark) and Richard Smith (Germany)
Player of the match: Subash Khakurel (Nep)

- Afghanistan Under-19s won the toss and elected to field.

28 July 2011
Scorecard

Canada; 212/3 (35 overs)	v	Scotland; 206 (34.4 overs)
Nitish Kumar 100* (93); Aman Bailwal 2/42 (6 overs)		Aman Bailwal 63 (56); Jobanjot Singh 4/39 (7 overs)

Canada Under-19s won by 6 runs
The Inch, Dublin
Umpires: Ian Gould (England) and Theunis van Schalkwyk (Namibia)
Player of the match: Nitish Kumar (Can)

- Canada Under-19s won the toss and elected to bat.
- Match reduced to 35 overs a side due to rain.

28 July 2011
Scorecard

Ireland; 180/9 (49.5 overs)	v	United States; 177/9 (50 overs)
Adam Coughlan 49 (82); Salman Ahmad 3/29 (10 overs)		Jodhbir Sandhu 36 (57); Barry McCarthy 2/42 (6 overs)

Ireland Under-19s won by 1 wicket
Clontarf Cricket Club Ground, Dublin
Umpires: Jeff Luck (Namibia) and Buddhi Pradhan (Nepal)
Player of the match: Adam Coughlan (Ire)

- Ireland Under-19s won the toss and elected to field.

28 July 2011
Scorecard

Kenya; 235/4 (38 overs)	v	Vanuatu; 102 (32.3 overs)
Kennedy Ochieng 85* (114); Patrick Matautaava 3/53 (8 overs)		Nalin Nipiko 25 (51); Rahul Vishram 4/9 (4.3 overs)

Kenya Under-19s won by 133 runs
Merrion Cricket Club Ground, Dublin
Umpires: Sarika Prasad (Singapore) and Ian Ramage (Scotland)
Player of the match: Duncan Allan (Ken)

- Kenya Under-19s won the toss and elected to bat.
- Match reduced to 38 overs a side due to rain.

28 July 2011
Scorecard

Namibia; 232 (49 overs)	v	Papua New Guinea; 143 (40.3 overs)
Justin Baard 49 (39); Charles Amini 3/38 (10 overs)		Toua Tom 41* (45); Zhivago Groenewald 3/16 (5 overs)

Namibia Under-19s won by 89 runs
The Hills Cricket Club Ground, Dublin
Umpires: Roger Dill (Bermuda) and Mark Hawthorne (Ireland)
Player of the match: Zhivago Groenewald (Nam)

- Papua New Guinea Under-19s won the toss and elected to field.

29 July 2011
Scorecard

Canada; 200 (49.1 overs)	v	Kenya; 215/7 (50 overs)
Nikhil Dutta 55 (99); Emmanuel Ringera 4/44 (10 overs)		Duncan Allan 103 (180); Nitish Kumar 3/26 (8 overs)

Kenya Under-19s won by 15 runs
The Hills Cricket Club Ground, Dublin
Umpires: Jeff Luck (Namibia) and Richard Smith (Germany)
Player of the match: Duncan Allan (Ken)

- Kenya Under-19s won the toss and elected to bat.

29 July 2011
Scorecard

Ireland; 212 (50 overs)	v	Afghanistan; 208 (50 overs)
Andrew McBrine 50 (70); Yamin Ahmadzai 3/56 (10 overs)		Hashmatullah Shaidi 46 (82); Adam Coughlan 2/27 (10 overs)

Ireland Under-19s won by 4 runs
The Inch, Dublin
Umpires: Ian Gould (England) and Buddhi Pradhan (Nepal)
Player of the match: Andrew McBrine (Ire)

- Afghanistan Under-19s won the toss and elected to field.

29 July 2011
Scorecard

Namibia; 131/4 (25.4 overs)	v	Vanuatu; 125 (46.3 overs)
Wian van Vuuren 40 (49); Jaxies Samuel 3/46 (9.4 overs)		Nalin Nipiko 37* (84); Christopher Coombe 3/20 (8 overs)

Namibia Under-19s won by 6 wickets
YMCA Cricket Club, Dublin
Umpires: Niels Bagh (Denmark) and Ian Ramage (Scotland)
Player of the match: Wian van Vuuren (Nam)

- Vanuatu Under-19s won the toss and elected to bat.

29 July 2011
Scorecard

Nepal; 157 (45.3 overs)	v	Scotland; 214 (49 overs)
Prithu Baskota 67 (114); Patrick Sadler 4/33 (10 overs)		Freddie Coleman 81 (102); Bhuvan Karki 5/41 (10 overs)

Scotland Under-19s won by 57 runs
Merrion Cricket Club Ground, Dublin
Umpires: Mark Hawthorne (Ireland) and Courtney Young (Cayman Islands)
Player of the match: Freddie Coleman (Sco)

- Scotland Under-19s won the toss and elected to bat.

29 July 2011
Scorecard

Papua New Guinea; 262/6 (43 overs)	v	United States; 256 (42.2 overs)
Lega Siaka 73 (80); Mital Patel 4/56 (8 overs)		Steven Taylor 140 (120); Raymond Haoda 3/31 (9 overs)

Papua New Guinea Under-19s won by 6 runs
Observatory Lane, Rathmines, Dublin
Umpires: Roger Dill (Bermuda) and Sarika Prasad (Singapore)
Player of the match: Steven Taylor (USA)

- United States of America Under-19s won the toss and elected to field.

31 July 2011
Scorecard

Afghanistan; 232/4 (42.2 overs)	v	Papua New Guinea; 228 (49.5 overs)
Javed Ahmadi 81 (85); Toua Tom 2/34 (8 overs)		Charles Amini 52 (84); Sayed Shirzad 5/31 (6.5 overs)

Afghanistan Under-19s won by 6 wickets
Observatory Lane, Rathmines, Dublin
Umpires: Mark Hawthorne (Ireland) and Theunis van Schalkwyk (Namibia)
Player of the match: Javed Ahmadi (Afg)

- Papua New Guinea Under-19s won the toss and elected to bat.

31 July 2011
Scorecard

Canada; 146/1 (25.3 overs)	v	Vanuatu; 145 (45.5 overs)
Nitish Kumar 61 (48); Nalin Nipiko 1/42 (6 overs)		Nalin Nipiko 48 (67); Manny Aulakh 3/11 (7.5 overs)

Canada Under-19s won by 9 wickets
Merrion Cricket Club Ground, Dublin
Umpires: Roger Dill (Bermuda) and Courtney Young (Cayman Islands)

- Vanuatu Under-19s won the toss and elected to bat.

31 July 2011
Scorecard

Ireland; 237/6 (50 overs)	v	Scotland; 206/8 (39.5 overs)
Jason van der Merwe 96 (114); Patrick Sadler 3/41 (10 overs)		Peter Ross 60* (71); George Dockrell 3/29 (8 overs)

Scotland Under-19s won by 2 wickets
The Hills Cricket Club Ground, Dublin
Umpires: Niels Bagh (Denmark) and Sarika Prasad (Singapore)
Player of the match: Peter Ross (Sco)

- Vanuatu Under-19s won the toss and elected to bat.
- Revised target due to rain : 206 runs from 40 overs

31 July 2011
Scorecard

Kenya; 107 (48.5 overs)	v	Nepal; 108/4 (19.2 overs)
Irfan Karim 40 (128); Krishna Karki 3/27 (10 overs)		Prithu Baskota 31* (42); Duncan Allan 4/38 (8 overs)

Nepal Under-19s won by 6 wickets
Railway Union Cricket Club, Sandymount, Dublin
Umpires: Ian Gould (England) and Jeff Luck (Namibia)
Player of the match: Avinah Karn (Nep)

- Nepal Under-19s won the toss and elected to field.

31 July 2011
Scorecard

Namibia; 266 (46.4 overs)	v	United States; 312/6 (50 overs)
Gert Lotter 67 (67); Salman Ahmad 4/60 (9.4 overs)		Steven Taylor 102 (74); Justin Baard 3/28 (8 overs)

United States of America Under-19s won by 46 runs
The Inch, Dublin
Umpires: Ian Ramage (Scotland) and Richard Smith (Germany)
Player of the match: Steven Taylor (USA)

- United States of America Under-19s won the toss and elected to field.

1 August 2011
Scorecard

Afghanistan; 183 (41.2 overs)	v	United States; 183/7 (45 overs)
Najibullah Zadran 70 (68); Mital Patel 6/35 (8.2 overs)		Steven Taylor 49 (43); Javed Ahmadi 3/36 (9 overs)

United States of America Under-19s won by 3 wickets
The Hills Cricket Club Ground, Dublin
Umpires: Mark Hawthorne (Ireland) and Richard Smith (Germany)
Player of the match: Mital Patel (USA)

- United States of America Under-19s won the toss and elected to field.
- Match reduced to 46 overs a side due to rain.
- Revised target due to rain : 183 runs from 46 overs

1 August 2011
Scorecard

Canada; 236/8 (50 overs)	v	Namibia; 241/7 (48.4 overs)
Nikhil Dutta 116* (137); Stephan Baard 5/49 (10 overs)		Zhivago Groenewald 68* (58); Manny Aulakh 2/22 (9 overs)

Namibia Under-19s won by 3 wickets
The Inch, Dublin
Umpires: Buddhi Pradhan (Nepal) and Sarika Prasad (Singapore)
Player of the match: Zhivago Groenewald (Nam)

- Canada Under-19s won the toss and elected to bat.

1 August 2011
Scorecard

Ireland; 226/8 (49.3 overs)	v	Kenya; 222/6 (50 overs)
Shane Getkate 63 (73); Raj Savala 2/32 (10 overs)		Duncan Allan 123 (149); Graeme McCarter 3/33 (7 overs)

Ireland Under-19s won by 2 wickets
Observatory Lane, Rathmines, Dublin
Umpires: Ian Gould (England) and Ian Ramage (Scotland)
Player of the match: Graeme McCarter (Ire)

- Ireland Under-19s won the toss and elected to field.

1 August 2011
Scorecard

Nepal; 250 (49.3 overs)	v	Vanuatu; 91 (30.5 overs)
Sagar Pun 51 (66); Shem Sala 3/49 (9 overs)		Nalin Nipiko 36* (52); Rahul Vishvakarma 4/26 (6.3 overs)

Nepal Under-19s won by 159 runs
YMCA Cricket Club, Dublin
Umpires: Jeff Luck (Namibia) and Courtney Young (Cayman Islands)
Player of the match: Bhuvan Karki (Nep)

- Nepal Under-19s won the toss and elected to bat.

1 August 2011
Scorecard

Papua New Guinea; 155 (32.5 overs)	v	Scotland; 157/8 (31.1 overs)
Christopher Kent 35 (50); Peter Legget 3/16 (7 overs)		Henry Edwards 62* (43); Raymond Haoda 4/18 (7 overs)

Scotland Under-19s won by 2 wickets
Oak Hill Cricket Club Ground, County Wicklow
Umpires: Roger Dill (Bermuda) and Theunis van Schalkwyk (Namibia)
Player of the match: Henry Edwards (Sco)

- Papua New Guinea Under-19s won the toss and elected to bat.

3 August 2011
Scorecard

Afghanistan; 211/9 (49.5 overs)	v	Namibia; 208/9 (50 overs)
Nasir Ahmadzai 64* (75); Stephan Baard 3/52 (9.5 overs)		Merwe Erasmus 52 (65); Javed Ahmadi 4/35 (10 overs)

Afghanistan Under-19s won by 1 wicket
Limavady Cricket Club, Limavady
Umpires: Sarika Prasad (Singapore) and Courtney Young (Cayman Islands)
Player of the match: Nasir Ahmadzai (Afg)

- Afghanistan Under-19s won the toss and elected to field.

3 August 2011
Scorecard

Canada; 107/7 (48.2 overs)	v	Nepal; 106 (42.5 overs)
Kyle Edghill 52* (133); Bhuvan Karki 2/10 (10 overs)		Pradeep Airee 22 (42); Kesavan Juvarajan 3/16 (8 overs)

Canada Under-19s won by 3 wickets
Bready Cricket Club, Bready
Umpires: Niels Bagh (Denmark) and Mark Hawthorne (Ireland)
Player of the match: KLT Edghill, (Canada)

- Canada Under-19s won the toss and elected to field.

3 August 2011
Scorecard

Ireland; 313/9 (50 overs)	v	Vanuatu; 148/9 (50 overs)
Andrew McBrine 107* (104); Patrick Matautaava 2/45 (9 overs)		Nalin Nipiko 62 (95); Shane Getkate 2/9 (4 overs)

Ireland Under-19s won by 165 runs
Lodge Road, Coleraine
Umpires: Roger Dill (Bermuda) and Buddhi Pradhan (Nepal)
Player of the match: Andrew McBrine (Ire)

- Ireland Under-19s won the toss and elected to bat.

3 August 2011
Scorecard

Kenya; 138 (36.3 overs)	v	Papua New Guinea; 204/9 (50 overs)
Duncan Allan 31 (37); Norman Vanua 3/20 (5.3 overs)		Toua Tom 82* (86); Martin Okoth 3/29 (8 overs)

Papua New Guinea Under-19s won by 66 runs
Fox Lodge Cricket Club, Strabane
Umpires: Ian Gould (England) and Richard Smith (Germany)
Player of the match: Toua Tom (PNG)

- Papua New Guinea Under-19s won the toss and elected to bat.

3 August 2011
Scorecard

Scotland; 125/2 (28.2 overs)	v	United States; 124 (35.2 overs)
Freddie Coleman 60* (74); Mital Patel 2/31 (4 overs)		Greg Sewdial 31 (44); Kyle Smith 4/21 (8.2 overs)

Scotland Under-19s won by 8 wickets
Woodvale Road, Eglinton
Umpires: Jeff Luck (Namibia) and Theunis van Schalkwyk (Namibia)
Player of the match: Kyle Smith (Sco)

- Papua New Guinea Under-19s won the toss and elected to bat.

5 August 2011
Scorecard

Afghanistan; 185 (47.5 overs)	v	Scotland; 218 (50 overs)
Afsar Khan 84 (135); Aman Bailwal 4/34 (9 overs)		Freddie Coleman 63 (93); Sayed Shirzad 4/33 (10 overs)

Scotland Under-19s won by 33 runs
Fox Lodge Cricket Club, Strabane
Umpires: Niels Bagh (Denmark) and Jeff Luck (Namibia)
Player of the match: Afsar Khan (Afg)

- Afghanistan Under-19s won the toss and elected to field.

5 August 2011
Scorecard

Ireland; 40/5 (13 overs)	v	Canada; 37 (25 overs)
Shane Getkate 10* (4); Manny Aulakh 3/26 (7 overs)		Kyle Edghill 10 (25); Graeme McCarter 5/8 (10 overs)

Ireland Under-19s won by 5 wickets
Limavady Cricket Club, Limavady
Umpires: Buddhi Pradhan (Nepal) and Theunis van Schalkwyk (Namibia)
Player of the match: Graeme McCarter (Ire)

- Canada Under-19s won the toss and elected to bat.

5 August 2011
Scorecard

Kenya; 108 (34.1 overs)	v	United States; 238/9 (50 overs)
Duncan Allan 46 (70); Salman Ahmad 3/14 (10 overs)		Greg Sewdial 68 (103); Emmanuel Ringera 4/50 (9 overs)

United States of America Under-19s won by 130 runs
Bready Cricket Club, Bready
Umpires: Mark Hawthorne (Ireland) and Ian Ramage (Scotland)
Player of the match: Greg Sewdial (USA)

- Kenya Under-19s won the toss and elected to field.

5 August 2011
Scorecard

Namibia; 209/9 (50 overs)	v	Nepal; 217 (49.5 overs)
Merwe Erasmus 63 (77); Krishna Karki 3/27 (10 overs)		Naresh Budhayer 51 (82); Christopher Coombe 6/41 (9.5 overs)

Nepal U-19s won by 8 runs
Drummond Cricket Club, Drummond
Umpires: Roger Dill (Bermuda) and Sarika Prasad (Singapore)
Player of the match: Christopher Coombe (Nam)

- Nepal Under-19s won the toss and elected to bat.

5 August 2011
Scorecard

Papua New Guinea; 245/7 (50 overs)	v	Vanuatu; 127 (42.2 overs)
Lega Siaka 49 (54); Jelany Chilia 2/31 (10 overs)		Nalin Nipiko 29 (38); Norman Vanua 3/15 (6.2 overs)

Papua New Guinea Under-19s won by 118 runs
Bready Cricket Club No2 Ground, Bready
Umpires: Richard Smith (Germany) and Courtney Young (Cayman Islands)
Player of the match: Christopher Kent (PNG)

- Papua New Guinea Under-19s won the toss and elected to bat.

6 August 2011
Scorecard

Afghanistan; 155/1 (18.4 overs)	v	Kenya; 154/5 (24 overs)
Javed Ahmadi 86* (51); Martin Okoth 1/26 (2 overs)		Rahul Vishram 59 (40); Shir Shirzai 2/33 (5 overs)

Afghanistan Under-19s won by 9 wickets
Limavady Cricket Club, Limavady
Umpires: Mark Hawthorne (Ireland) and Courtney Young (Cayman Islands)
Player of the match: Javed Ahmadi (Afg)

- Kenya Under-19s won the toss and elected to bat.
- Match reduced to 24 overs a side due to rain.

6 August 2011
Scorecard

Canada; 261/9 (50 overs)	v	Papua New Guinea; 264/6 (49.4 overs)
Nitish Kumar 150 (126); Charles Amini 2/28 (8 overs)		Christopher Kent 166* (131); Manny Aulakh 2/36 (9.4 overs)

Papua New Guinea Under-19s won by 4 wickets
Woodvale Road, Eglinton
Umpires: Buddhi Pradhan (Nepal) and Theunis van Schalkwyk (Namibia)
Player of the match: Christopher Kent (PNG)

- Papua New Guinea Under-19s won the toss and elected to field.

6 August 2011
Scorecard

Ireland; 175 (46 overs)	v	Nepal; 187/7 (46 overs)
George Dockrell 55 (86); Rahul Vishvakarma 4/28 (9 overs)		Sagar Pun 50 (100); George Dockrell 3/15 (10 overs)

Nepal Under-19s won by 10 runs (D/L method)
Bready Cricket Club, Bready
Umpires: Jeff Luck (Namibia) and Ian Ramage (Scotland)
Player of the match: George Dockrell (Ire)

- Ireland Under-19s won the toss and elected to field.
- Match reduced to 46 overs a side due to rain.

6 August 2011
Scorecard

Namibia; 140 (39.5 overs)	v	Scotland; 180/9 (43 overs)
Pelham Myburgh 43 (72); Ross McLean 3/12 (5 overs)		Ross McLean 35 (74); Stephan Baard 4/28 (6 overs)

Scotland Under-19s won by 40 runs
Bready Cricket Club No2 Ground, Bready
Umpires: Sarika Prasad (Singapore) and Richard Smith (Germany)
Player of the match: Ross McLean (Sco)

- Scotland Under-19s won the toss and elected to bat.
- Match reduced to 43 overs a side due to rain.

6 August 2011
Scorecard

Vanuatu; 128/8 (32 overs)	v	United States; 118/2 (22 overs)
Jelany Chilia 29 (46); Hammad Shahid 2/16 (7 overs)		Steven Taylor 33* (63); Callum Blake 1/10 (2 overs)

United States of America Under-19s won by 42 runs (D/L method)
Drummond Cricket Club, Drummond
Umpires: Niels Bagh (Denmark) and Roger Dill (Bermuda)
Player of the match: Steven Taylor (USA)

- United States of America Under-19s won the toss and elected to field.
- Match reduced to 32 overs a side due to rain.

7 August 2011
Scorecard

Afghanistan; 116/1 (16.2 overs)	v	Vanuatu; 111 (26.2 overs)
Javed Ahmadi 68* (49); Patrick Matautaava 1/42 (6.2 overs)		Patrick Matautaava 29 (25); Sayed Shirzad 5/38 (9 overs)

Afghanistan Under-19s won by 9 wickets
Bready Cricket Club, Bready
Umpires: Ian Ramage (Scotland) and Theunis van Schalkwyk (Namibia)
Player of the match: Sayed Shirzad (Afg)

- United States of America Under-19s won the toss and elected to field.
- Match reduced to 32 overs a side due to rain.

7 August 2011
Scorecard

Canada; 102/5 (33.2 overs)	v	United States; 101 (40.3 overs)
Rayyan Pathan 42 (29); Hammad Shahid 2/28 (7 overs)		Hammad Shahid 15* (45); Manny Aulakh 6/32 (10 overs)

Canada Under-19s won by 5 wickets
Bready Cricket Club No2 Ground, Bready
Umpires: Mark Hawthorne (Ireland) and Sarika Prasad (Singapore)
Player of the match: Manny Aulakh (Can)

- United States of America Under-19s won the toss and elected to bat.

7 August 2011
Scorecard

Kenya; 173/8 (50 overs)	v	Scotland; 188 (47.4 overs)
Rushabh Patel 50 (120); Aman Bailwal 2/47 (9 overs)		Sam Page 48 (69); Harrison Angila 3/32 (10 overs)

Scotland Under-19s won by 15 runs
Woodvale Road, Eglinton
Umpires: Roger Dill (Bermuda) and Richard Smith (Germany)
Player of the match: Matthew Cross (Sco)

- Scotland Under-19s won the toss and elected to bat.

7 August 2011
Scorecard

Nepal; 277/7 (50 overs)	v	Papua New Guinea; 248 (49.3 overs)
Rajesh Pulami Magar 91 (100); Sese Bau 2/22 (4 overs)		Christopher Kent 80 (99); Avinash Karn 5/36 (6.3 overs)

Nepal Under-19s won by 29 runs
Lodge Road, Coleraine
Umpires: Niels Bagh (Denmark) and Jeff Luck (Namibia)
Player of the match: Rajesh Pulami Magar (Nep)

- Nepal Under-19s won the toss and elected to bat.

8 August 2011
Scorecard

Ireland; 246/4 (47 overs)	v	Namibia; 245/9 (50 overs)
George Dockrell 83* (113); Andre Engelbrecht 2/37 (10 overs)		Pelham Myburgh 66 (111); George Dockrell 3/35 (10 overs)

Ireland Under-19s won by 6 wickets
Fox Lodge Cricket Club, Strabane
Umpires: Buddhi Pradhan (Nepal) and Courtney Young (Cayman Islands)
Player of the match: George Dockrell (Ire)

- Namibia Under-19s won the toss and elected to bat.
- Match postponed from 7 August due to rain.

9 August 2011
Scorecard

Afghanistan; 75/2 (15 overs)	v	Canada; 71 (32.2 overs)
Javed Ahmadi 34* (25); Jobanjot Singh 1/25 (7 overs)		Darren Ramsammy 13 (37); Abdul Naseri 2/6 (8 overs)

Afghanistan Under-19s won by 8 wickets
Fox Lodge Cricket Club, Strabane
Umpires: Ian Ramage (Scotland) and Courtney Young (Cayman Islands)
Player of the match: Javed Ahmadi (Afg)

- Afghanistan Under-19s won the toss and elected to field.

9 August 2011
Scorecard

Ireland; 155 (46.4 overs)	v	Papua New Guinea; 157/5 (29.1 overs)
Adam Coughlan 29 (64); Norman Vanua 4/27 (7.4 overs)		Sese Bau 41 (68); Barry McCarthy 2/32 (4.1 overs)

Papua New Guinea Under-19s won by 5 wickets
Woodvale Road, Eglinton
Umpires: Niels Bagh (Denmark) and Roger Dill (Bermuda)
Player of the match: Sese Bau (PNG)

- Ireland Under-19s won the toss and elected to bat.

9 August 2011
Scorecard

Kenya; 205/8 (50 overs)	v	Namibia; 314/5 (50 overs)
Joseph Ochieng 54 (77); Justin Baard 3/40 (9 overs)		Stephan Baard 89 (93); Martin Okoth 1/22 (4 overs)

Namibia Under-19s won by 109 runs
Drummond Cricket Club, Drummond
Umpires: Mark Hawthorne (Ireland) and Buddhi Pradhan (Nepal)
Player of the match: Stephan Baard (Nam)

- Namibia Under-19s won the toss and elected to bat.

9 August 2011
Scorecard

Nepal; 264/9 (50 overs)	v	United States; 165 (44.1 overs)
Naresh Budhayer 76 (94); Hammad Shahid 3/32 (7.2 overs)		Steven Taylor 52 (58); Rahul Vishvakarma 4/24 (8.1 overs)

Nepal Under-19s won by 99 runs
Limavady Cricket Club, Limavady
Umpires: Jeff Luck (Namibia) and Sarika Prasad (Singapore)
Player of the match: Naresh Budhayer (Nep)

- Nepal Under-19s won the toss and elected to bat.

9 August 2011
Scorecard

Scotland; 222/8 (50 overs)	v	Vanuatu; 92 (38.5 overs)
Ross McLean 69 (132); Patrick Matautaava 2/23 (6 overs)		Worford Kalworai 25 (48); Kyle Smith 5/17 (8.5 overs)

Scotland Under-19s won by 130 runs
Lodge Road, Coleraine
Umpires: Richard Smith (Germany) and Theunis van Schalkwyk (Namibia)
Player of the match: Kyle Smith (Sco)

- Scotland Under-19s won the toss and elected to bat.

== Final table ==
This was how the final table looked like. The top 6 teams of the tournament qualified for the 2012 U-19 Cricket World Cup.

Team	Pld	W	L	NR	T	NRR	Pts
Scotland	9	8	1	0	0	+0.949	16
Nepal	9	7	2	0	0	+0.923	14
Ireland	9	6	3	0	0	+0.612	12
Afghanistan	9	5	4	0	0	+0.692	10
Papua New Guinea	9	5	4	0	0	+0.302	10
Namibia	9	4	5	0	0	+0.494	8
United States	9	4	5	0	0	–0.118	8
Canada	9	4	5	0	0	–0.355	8
Kenya	9	2	7	0	0	–0.841	4
Vanuatu	9	0	9	0	0	–2.942	0
