= 2010 Under-19 Cricket World Cup squads =

This is a list of the squads picked for the 2010 ICC Under-19 Cricket World Cup. Bold indicates that a player went on to play senior international cricket.

== Group A ==
=== Afghanistan ===
Coach:

Player	Date of Birth	Batting	Bowling style
**Noor-ul-Haq (c)**	2 April 1992 (aged 17)	Right	Right-arm Offbreak
Shir Shirzai (vc)	29 June 1993 (aged 16)	Right	Right-arm Fast-Medium
**Afsar Zazai (wk)**	10 August 1993 (aged 16)	Right	None
**Aftab Alam**	30 November 1992 (aged 17)	Right	Right-arm Medium-Fast
Anwar Anwari	22 January 1992 (aged 17)
Ayan Aminzai	1 June 1991 (aged 18)	Right	Right-arm Fast-Medium
Ayub Khan	5 March 1990 (aged 19)	Right	Right-arm Medium-Fast
**Hamza Hotak**	15 August 1991 (aged 18)	Right	Slow Left-arm Orthodox
**Hashmatullah Shaidi**	4 November 1994 (aged 15)	Right	Right-arm Offbreak
**Izatullah Dawlatzai**	10 November 1991 (aged 18)	Right	Right-arm Fast-Medium
**Javed Ahmadi**	2 January 1992 (aged 18)	Right	Right-arm Offbreak
Khushal Rasooli (wk)	9 May 1992 (aged 17)	Right	None
Murad Ali (wk)	3 January 1992 (aged 18)	Right	None
**Yamin Ahmadzai**	25 June 1992 (aged 17)	Right	Right-arm Medium-Fast
**Zakiullah Zaki**	15 July 1990 (aged 19)	Right	Right-arm Legbreak

=== England ===
Coach: (England) Mark Robinson

Player	Date of Birth	Batting	Bowling style
Azeem Rafiq (c)	27 February 1991 (aged 18)	Right	Right-arm Offbreak
**James Vince** (vc)	14 March 1991 (aged 18)	Right	Right-arm Medium
Adam Ball	1 March 1993 (aged 16)	Right	Left-arm Fast-Medium
Michael Bates (wk)	10 October 1990 (aged 19)	Right	None
Paul Best	8 March 1991 (aged 18)	Left	Slow Left-arm Orthodox
**Danny Briggs**	30 April 1991 (aged 18)	Right	Slow Left-arm Orthodox
Nathan Buck	26 April 1991 (aged 18)	Right	Right-arm Medium-Fast
**Jos Buttler**	8 September 1990 (aged 19)	Right	None
Chris Dent	20 January 1991 (aged 18)	Left	None
Matt Dunn	5 May 1992 (aged 17)	Left	Right-arm Fast-Medium
Ateeq Javid	15 October 1991 (aged 18)	Right	Right-arm Medium
Jack Manuel	13 February 1991 (aged 18)	Left	Right-arm Offbreak
David Payne	15 February 1991 (aged 18)	Left	Left-arm Fast-Medium
**Joe Root**	30 December 1990 (aged 19)	Right	Right-arm Offbreak
**Ben Stokes**	4 June 1991 (aged 18)	Left	Right-arm Medium
Calum Haggett (withdrawn)	30 October 1990 (aged 19)	Left	Right-arm Medium

=== Hong Kong ===
Coach: (Hong Kong) Afzaal Haider

Player	Date of Birth	Batting	Bowling style
**Jamie Atkinson** (c) (wk)	23 August 1990 (aged 19)	Right	None
**Irfan Ahmed** (vc)	22 November 1989 (aged 20)	Right	Right-arm Fast-Medium
Aditya Kanthan	2 November 1990 (aged 19)	Right	Right-arm Medium-Fast
Aizaz Khan	21 March 1993 (aged 16)	Right	Right-arm Medium-Fast
Ashish Gadhia	9 February 1991 (aged 18)	Right	Slow Left-arm Orthodox
Asif Khan	28 November 1989 (aged 20)	Right	Right-arm Medium
**Mark Chapman**	27 June 1994 (aged 15)	Left	Slow Left-arm Orthodox
Vikash Gope (wk)	10 October 1992 (aged 17)	Right	None
Niaz Ali	26 December 1992 (aged 17)	Right	Left-arm Medium-Fast
**Nizakat Khan**	8 August 1992 (aged 17)	Right	Right-arm Legbreak
Shakeel Haq	10 April 1990 (aged 19)	Left	Slow Left-arm Orthodox
Harmeet Singh	8 October 1990 (aged 19)	Right	Right-arm Medium
Alex Smith	28 February 1991 (aged 18)	Left	Left-arm Legbreak
Max Tucker	22 December 1991 (aged 18)	Left	Right-arm Offbreak
**Waqas Barkat** (wk)	17 December 1990 (aged 19)	Right	None

=== India ===
Coach: (India) Chandrakant Pandit

Player	Date of Birth	Batting	Bowling style
Ashok Menaria (c)	29 October 1990 (aged 19)	Left	Slow Left-arm Orthodox
**Mandeep Singh** (vc)	18 December 1991 (aged 18)	Right	Right-arm Medium
**Mayank Agarwal**	16 February 1991 (aged 18)	Right	None
**Harmeet Singh**	7 September 1992 (aged 17)	Left	Slow Left-arm Orthodox
Harpreet Singh	11 August 1991 (aged 18)	Left	Right-arm Medium
Gaurav Jathar	30 January 1991 (aged 18)	Right	Slow Left-arm Orthodox
Manan Sharma	19 March 1991 (aged 18)	Left	Slow Left-arm Orthodox
**Saurabh Netravalkar**	16 October 1991 (aged 18)	Right	Left-arm Fast-Medium
**Harshal Patel**	23 November 1990 (aged 19)	Right	Right-arm Allrounder Medium
**KL Rahul** (wk)	18 April 1992 (aged 17)	Right	None
Akshath Reddy	11 February 1991 (aged 18)	Right	Right-arm Legbreak
**Sandeep Sharma**	18 May 1993 (aged 16)	Right	Right-arm Medium-Fast
Sufiyan Shaikh (wk)	25 November 1990 (aged 19)	Right	None
**Jaydev Unadkat**	18 October 1991 (aged 18)	Right	Left-arm Medium
Zahid Ali (wk)	17 November 1991 (aged 18)	Right	None

== Group B ==
=== Australia ===
Coach: (Australia) Brian McFadyen

Player	Date of Birth	Batting	Bowling style
**Mitchell Marsh (c)**	20 October 1991 (aged 18)	Right	Right-arm Medium
Tim Armstrong	26 September 1990 (aged 19)	Right	Right-arm Fast-Medium
Tom Beaton	28 November 1990 (aged 19)	Right	Right-arm Medium
Nick Buchanan	3 April 1991 (aged 18)	Right	Right-arm Fast-Medium
Jackson Coleman	18 December 1991 (aged 18)	Right	Left-arm Fast-Medium
Luke Doran	14 August 1991 (aged 18)	Right	Slow Left-arm Orthodox
Ben Dougall	16 December 1991 (aged 18)	Left	Right-arm Offbreak
Jason Floros	24 November 1990 (aged 19)	Left	Right-arm Offbreak
**Josh Hazlewood**	8 January 1991 (aged 19)	Left	Right-arm Fast-Medium
Alex Keath	20 January 1992 (aged 17)	Right	Right-arm Medium
Alister McDermott	7 June 1991 (aged 18)	Right	Right-arm Fast-Medium
**Nic Maddinson**	21 December 1991 (aged 18)	Left	Slow Left-arm Orthodox
**Kane Richardson**	12 February 1991 (aged 18)	Right	Right-arm Fast-Medium
Tom Triffitt (wk)	13 November 1990 (aged 19)	Right	None
**Adam Zampa**	31 March 1992 (aged 17)	Right	Right-arm Legbreak Googly

=== Ireland ===
Coach: (Republic of Ireland) Matt Dwyer

Player	Date of Birth	Batting	Bowling style
**Andrew Balbirnie (c) (wk)**	28 December 1990 (aged 19)	Right	Right-arm Offbreak
**Paul Stirling** (vc)	3 September 1990 (aged 19)	Right	Right-arm Offbreak
Ben Ackland	26 October 1989 (aged 20)	Right	Right-arm Offbreak
Jordan Coghlan	30 October 1992 (aged 17)	Left	Right-arm Medium
Adrian D'Arcy (wk)	10 December 1990 (aged 19)	Left	Right-arm Medium
**George Dockrell**	22 July 1992 (aged 17)	Right	Slow Left-arm Orthodox
**Shane Getkate**	2 October 1991 (aged 18)	Right	Right-arm Medium-Fast
**Graeme McCarter**	10 October 1992 (aged 17)	Right	Right-arm Medium
Graham McDonnell	20 October 1990 (aged 19)	Right	Right-arm Medium
Lee Nelson	5 December 1990 (aged 19)	Right	Right-arm Offbreak
**Stuart Poynter** (wk)	18 October 1990 (aged 19)	Right	None
**Eddie Richardson**	22 July 1990 (aged 19)	Right	Right-arm Medium
**James Shannon**	12 February 1990 (aged 19)	Right	Right-arm Offbreak
**Stuart Thompson**	15 August 1991 (aged 18)	Left	Right-arm Medium-Fast
**Craig Young**	4 April 1990 (aged 19)	Right	Right-arm Medium

=== South Africa ===
Coach: (South Africa) Ray Jennings

Player	Date of Birth	Batting	Bowling style
Joshua Richards (c) (wk)	5 December 1990 (aged 19)	Right	None
**Colin Ackermann (vc)**	4 April 1991 (aged 18)	Right	Right-arm Offbreak
Cody Chetty	28 June 1991 (aged 18)	Right	Right-arm Offbreak
Dale Deeb	8 September 1990 (aged 19)	Right	Slow Left-arm Orthodox
Rabian Engelbrecht	4 November 1992 (aged 17)	Right	Right-arm Medium-Fast
Dominic Hendricks	7 November 1990 (aged 19)	Left	Right-arm Offbreak
Graham Hume	23 November 1990 (aged 19)	Left	Right-arm Fast-Medium
Simon Khomari	5 January 1991 (aged 19)	Right	Slow Left-arm Orthodox
Sammy Mofokeng	5 August 1991 (aged 18)	Right	Right-arm Fast-Medium
Bokang Mosena	6 February 1991 (aged 18)	Right	Right-arm Medium
Malcolm Nofal	18 September 1991 (aged 18)	Left	Slow Left-arm Orthodox
Jerry Nqolo	23 July 1991 (aged 18)	Right	Right-arm Medium
Stephan Smith	11 November 1990 (aged 19)	Right	Right-arm Fast-Medium
Kirk Wernars	14 June 1991 (aged 18)	Left	Right-arm Fast-Medium
David White	22 May 1991 (aged 18)	Right	Right-arm Medium-Fast
Matthew Kennedy (withdrawn)	6 March 1991 (aged 18)	Right	Right-arm Fast

=== United States ===
Coach:

Player	Date of Birth	Batting	Bowling style
Shiva Vashishat (c)	10 November 1989 (aged 20)	Right	Right-arm Legbreak
Greg Sewdial (vc)	6 September 1991 (aged 18)	Right	Right-arm Offbreak
Salman Ahmad	10 May 1992 (aged 17)	Right	Right-arm Fast-Medium
Regis Burton	6 April 1991 (aged 18)	Right	Right-arm Medium
Ryan Corns	9 August 1990 (aged 19)	Right	Slow Left-arm Orthodox
Abhijit Joshi	10 October 1992 (aged 17)	Right	Right-arm Offbreak
Andy Mohammed	10 September 1990 (aged 19)	Left	Slow Left-arm Orthodox
Muhammad Ghous	24 April 1990 (aged 19)	Left	Right-arm Offbreak
Naseer Jamali	10 September 1989 (aged 20)	Right	Left-arm Medium
Saqib Saleem	1 January 1990 (aged 20)	Right	Right-arm Legbreak
Yash Shah	7 July 1990 (aged 19)	Right	Slow Left-arm Orthodox
Hammad Shahid	7 December 1991 (aged 18)	Right	Right-arm Fast
Saami Siddiqui (wk)	23 September 1989 (aged 20)	Right	None
**Steven Taylor** (wk)	9 November 1993 (aged 16)	Left	Right-arm Offbreak
Henry Wardley	11 December 1989 (aged 20)	Left	Slow Left-arm Orthodox

== Group C ==
=== Canada ===
Coach: (Jamaica) Wilfred Plummer

Player	Date of Birth	Batting	Bowling style
Rustam Bhatti (c) (wk)	18 February 1990 (aged 19)	Right	Right-arm Offbreak
Hiral Patel (vc)	10 August 1991 (aged 18)	Right	Slow Left-arm Orthodox
Arsalan Qadir	15 September 1989 (aged 20)	Right	Right-arm Medium
Asif Manjra	2 April 1990 (aged 19)	Right	Right-arm Legbreak
Manny Aulakh	17 November 1991 (aged 18)	Right	Right-arm Medium
Parth Desai	11 December 1990 (aged 19)	Right	Slow Left-arm Orthodox
Darius D'Souza	11 October 1989 (aged 20)	Right	Right-arm Offbreak
Ruvindu Gunasekera	20 July 1991 (aged 18)	Left	Legbreak Googly
Hamza Tariq (wk)	21 July 1990 (aged 19)	Right	none
Harpreet	19 August 1990 (aged 19)	Right	Left-arm Medium
Hardik Kotak	15 June 1991 (aged 18)	Right	Right-arm Medium
Nitish Kumar	21 May 1994 (aged 15)	Right	Right-arm Offbreak
Riyaz Pathan	8 September 1989 (aged 20)	Right	Right-arm Offbreak
Usman Limbada	2 October 1989 (aged 20)	Right	Right-arm Medium
Zain Mahmood	14 September 1990 (aged 19)	Right	Right-arm Medium

=== New Zealand ===
Coach: (New Zealand) Chris Kuggeleijn

Player	Date of Birth	Batting	Bowling style
Craig Cachopa (c) (wk)	17 January 1992 (aged 17)	Right	None
**Corey Anderson**	13 December 1990 (aged 19)	Left	Left-arm Medium-Fast
**Tom Blundell**	1 September 1990 (aged 19)	Right	Right-arm Offbreak
Harry Boam	15 October 1990 (aged 19)	Right	Right-arm Medium
**Doug Bracewell**	28 September 1990 (aged 19)	Right	Right-arm Medium
**Michael Bracewell (wk)**	14 February 1991 (aged 18)	Left	None
**Dane Cleaver**	1 January 1992 (aged 18)	Right	Right-arm Legbreak
Jono Hickey	30 March 1991 (aged 18)	Left	Right-arm Legbreak
Tim Johnston	28 October 1990 (aged 19)	Right	Right-arm Offbreak
**Tom Latham**	2 April 1992 (aged 17)	Left	Right-arm Medium
**Jimmy Neesham**	17 September 1990 (aged 19)	Left	Right-arm Medium
Bevan Small	24 February 1992 (aged 17)	Right	Right-arm Medium-Fast
Mattie Thomas	5 December 1991 (aged 18)	Right	Slow Left-arm Orthodox
**Logan van Beek**	7 September 1990 (aged 19)	Right	Right-arm Fast
**Ben Wheeler**	10 November 1991 (aged 18)	Right	Left-arm Medium-Fast

=== Sri Lanka ===
Coach:

Player	Date of Birth	Batting	Bowling style
Chathura Peiris (c)	23 September 1990 (aged 19)	Left	Left-arm Medium-Fast
**Kithuruwan Vithanage**	26 February 1991 (aged 18)	Left	Right-arm Legbreak
Andri Berenger (wk)	29 August 1991 (aged 18)	Right	None
Rumesh Buddika	14 November 1990 (aged 19)	Left	Right-arm Offbreak
Akshu Fernando	11 March 1991 (aged 18)	Right	Right-arm Offbreak
**Dhanushka Gunathilaka**	17 March 1991 (aged 18)	Left	Right-arm Medium-Fast
Rushan Jaleel	7 October 1990 (aged 19)	Right	Right-arm Offbreak
Charith Jayampathi	1 February 1991 (aged 18)	Left	Left-arm Medium-Fast
Lahiru Jayaratne	12 October 1991 (aged 18)	Right	Right-arm Medium-Fast
Udara Jayasundera	3 January 1991 (aged 19)	Left	Right-arm Legbreak
Maduka Liyanapathiranage	1 January 1992 (aged 18)	Right	Right-arm Off-Break
Kasun Madushanka	23 August 1991 (aged 18)	Right	Right-arm Fast-Medium
Saranga Rajaguru	12 November 1992 (aged 17)	Left	Right-arm Legbreak
Denuwan Rajakaruna (wk)	30 September 1990 (aged 19)	Right	None
**Bhanuka Rajapaksa**	24 October 1991 (aged 18)	Left	Right-arm Medium
Yashodha Lanka (withdrawn)	1 October 1992 (aged 17)	Right	Left-arm Medium-Fast

=== Zimbabwe ===
Coach: (Zimbabwe) Kevin Curran

Player	Date of Birth	Batting	Bowling style
Dylon Higgins (c)	5 April 1991 (aged 18)	Right	Right-arm Legbreak
**Peter Moor** (vc)	2 February 1991 (aged 18)	Right	Right-arm Offbreak
**Tendai Chatara**	28 February 1991 (aged 18)	Right	Right-arm Fast-Medium
Steve Chimhamhiwa	5 March 1991 (aged 18)	Right	Right-arm Medium
Gary Chirimuuta	16 July 1991 (aged 18)	Right	Right-arm Offbreak
Scott Daly	5 August 1991 (aged 18)	Right	Right-arm Slow-Medium
Andrew Lindsay	5 May 1991 (aged 18)	Right	Right-arm Medium
Dean Mazhawidza (wk)	22 March 1991 (aged 18)	Right	None
Simon Mugava	29 November 1990 (aged 19)	Right	Right-arm Offbreak
**Natsai M'shangwe**	2 February 1991 (aged 18)	Right	Right-arm Legbreak
**Tinotenda Mutombodzi**	21 December 1990 (aged 19)	Right	Right-arm Legbreak
Richard Muzhange	30 January 1991 (aged 18)	Right	Right-arm Medium
Calum Price	4 January 1992 (aged 18)	Right	Right-arm Medium
Nathan Waller	19 November 1991 (aged 18)	Right	Right-arm Medium
Mazvita Zambuko	31 March 1991 (aged 18)	Right	Right-arm Medium

== Group D ==
=== Bangladesh ===
Coach: (Bangladesh) Minhajul Abedin

Player	Date of Birth	Batting	Bowling style
Mahmudul Hasan (c)	10 December 1990 (aged 19)	Right	Right-arm Off-Break
Amit Majumder (vc)	1 January 1991 (aged 19)	Left	Right arm Leg-Break
**Abul Hasan**	5 August 1992 (aged 17)	Left	Right-arm Medium-Fast
Alauddin Babu	5 December 1991 (aged 18)	Right	Right-arm Medium-Fast
**Anamul Haque** (wk)	16 December 1992 (aged 17)	Right	None
Arman Badshah	25 March 1992 (aged 17)	Right	Right-arm Medium-Fast
**Kamrul Islam Rabbi**	10 December 1991 (aged 18)	Right	Right-arm Medium-Fast
**Mominul Haque**	29 September 1991 (aged 18)	Left	Slow Left-arm Orthodox
Noor Hossain	12 March 1992 (aged 17)	Right	Right-arm Legbreak
**Nurul Hasan** (wk)	2 November 1993 (aged 16)	Right	None
**Sabbir Rahman**	20 August 1991 (aged 18)	Right	Right-arm Legbreak
Saikat Ali	23 October 1991 (aged 18)	Right	Right-arm Medium
Shaker Ahmed	23 May 1992 (aged 17)	Left	Slow Left-arm Orthodox
**Soumya Sarkar**	25 February 1993 (aged 16)	Left	Right-arm Medium-Fast
Tasamul Haque	2 October 1991 (aged 18)	Right	Right-arm Offbreak

=== Pakistan ===
Coach:

Player	Date of Birth	Batting	Bowling style
Azeem Ghumman (c)	24 January 1991 (aged 18)	Right	Right-arm Legbreak
Sarmad Bhatti (vc)	26 September 1991 (aged 18)	Left	None
Abdul Ameer	20 March 1992 (aged 17)	Left	Left-arm Medium-Fast
**Ahmed Shehzad**	23 November 1991 (aged 18)	Right	Right-arm Legbreak
Ahsan Ali	10 December 1993 (aged 16)	Right	Right-arm Legbreak
Anop Santosh (wk)	23 June 1991 (aged 18)	Right	None
**Babar Azam**	15 October 1994 (aged 15)	Right	Right-arm Offbreak
Fayyaz Butt	17 August 1993 (aged 16)	Right	Right-arm Medium-Fast
**Hammad Azam**	16 March 1991 (aged 18)	Right	Right-arm Medium
Mohammad Naeem	13 December 1992 (aged 17)	Right	None
Mohammad Waqas (wk)	14 December 1990 (aged 19)	Right	None
Rameez Aziz	15 September 1990 (aged 19)	Left	Right-arm Offbreak
**Raza Hasan**	8 July 1992 (aged 17)	Right	Slow Left-arm Orthodox
Shahzaib Ahmed	8 September 1991 (aged 18)	Right	Right-arm Legbreak
**Usman Qadir**	10 October 1993 (aged 16)	Right	Right-arm Legbreak
Kaleem Sana (withdrawn)	1 January 1994 (aged 16)	Right	Left-arm Medium-Fast

=== Papua New Guinea ===
Coach: (Australia) Andy Bichel

Player	Date of Birth	Batting	Bowling style
**Jason Kila** (c)	15 January 1990 (aged 20)	Left	Slow Left-arm Orthodox
**John Reva (vc)**	23 September 1990 (aged 19)	Right	Right-arm Fast-Medium
**Charles Amini**	14 April 1992 (aged 17)	Left	Left-arm Legbreak
**Sese Bau**	23 June 1992 (aged 17)	Left	Right-arm Medium
Jonathan Diho	24 January 1990 (aged 19)	Right	Right-arm Fast-Medium
Steven Eno (wk)	12 August 1990 (aged 19)	Right	None
**Raymond Haoda**	15 December 1991 (aged 18)	Right	Right-arm Medium
Timothy Mou	5 December 1991 (aged 18)	Right	Right-arm Fast-Medium
Vagi "Lista" Oala	12 November 1991 (aged 18)	Right	None
Rogeauka Roge (wk)	22 October 1991 (aged 18)	Left	None
Heni Siaka	27 September 1989 (aged 20)	Right	None
**Lega Siaka**	21 December 1992 (aged 17)	Right	Right-arm Fast-Medium and Legbreak
Lega Tau	22 December 1990 (aged 19)	Right	None
Toua Tom	14 November 1992 (aged 17)	Right	Right-arm Medium
**Tony Ura**	15 October 1989 (aged 20)	Right	None

=== West Indies ===
Coach:

Player	Date of Birth	Batting	Bowling style
Andre Creary (c)	17 November 1990 (aged 19)	Right	Right-arm Offbreak
Yannick Ottley (vc)	7 September 1991 (aged 18)	Right	Slow Left-arm Orthodox
**Jermaine Blackwood**	20 November 1991 (aged 18)	Right	Right-arm Offbreak
Nelson Bolan	29 November 1990 (aged 19)	Right	Right-arm Fast-Medium
**Kraigg Brathwaite**	2 December 1992 (aged 17)	Right	Right-arm Offbreak
**John Campbell**	23 September 1993 (aged 16)	Left	Right-arm Offbreak
Yannic Cariah	22 June 1992 (aged 17)	Left	Right-arm Legbreak
Akeem Dewar	30 August 1991 (aged 18)	Right	Right-arm Legbreak
**Shane Dowrich** (wk)	30 October 1991 (aged 18)	Right	None
Nicholson Gordon	22 October 1991 (aged 18)	Right	Right-arm Fast-Medium
Trevon Griffith	15 April 1991 (aged 18)	Left	None
**Jason Holder**	5 November 1991 (aged 18)	Right	Right-arm Medium-Fast
Keon Joseph	25 November 1991 (aged 18)	Right	Right-arm Fast-Medium
**Evin Lewis**	27 December 1991 (aged 18)	Left	None
**Jomel Warrican**	20 May 1992 (aged 17)	Left	Slow Left-arm Orthodox
