= ICC U19 Cricket World Cup Americas Qualifier =

ICC Americas Under-19 Championship
- Administrator: ICC Americas
- Format: 50 overs
- First edition: 2001
- Latest edition: 2024
- Current champion: United States
- Most successful: Canada (7 titles)

The ICC U19 Cricket World Cup Americas Qualifier (formerly ICC Americas Under-19 Championship) is an international cricket tournament contested by under-19 national teams from the ICC Americas region. The tournament has run bi-annually since 2001, occasionally with more than one division. The tournament serves as a qualification tournament for the Under-19 World Cup. Canada are by far the most successful team overall, winning seven titles, to the three won by the United States and the single title won by Bermuda.

== History ==
Prior to the introduction of the Americas Under-19 Championship in 2001 there was no qualification route for associate and affiliate teams to the U-19 World Cup. As a result, the only Americas team represented in the 1998 competition was the full member, the West Indies.

With the new championship came the possibility for an individual team to qualify for the U-19 World Cup. The winner of each championship would automatically go through to play in the finals the following year.

For the 2000 tournament, a combined Americas team was also given the chance to take part, representing the four longstanding associate members from the region: Canada, USA, Bermuda and Argentina.

2005 ICC U19 Cricket World Cup Americas Qualifier The tournament featured five teams, the same as at the preceding 2003 edition, but a full USA Squad featured for the first time, to compete at a simple round-robin. The United States finished the tournament undefeated to win its first title, and consequently qualified for the 2006 Under-19 World Cup in Sri Lanka. The team had nearly been barred from playing, as part of proposed International Cricket Council (ICC) sanctions against the United States of America Cricket Association (USACA) for maladministration, but ICC allowed the participation of the U19 Squad for the 2005 Qualifiers. Canada was the runner-up at the championship, with the Cayman Islands placing third, Bermuda fourth, and Argentina placing last, again finishing winless. The tournament was affected by rain, with two matches being abandoned and another shortened. A feature of the championship was its low scoring, with only four innings above 200 being recorded from the ten matches played. The tournament's leading runscorer, Canadian batsman Trevin Bastiampillai, was the only player to record more than 100 runs, while the leading wicket-taker, and MVP of the tournament was American bowler Abhimanyu Rajp, who took two five-wicket hauls.

In 2009, Under-19 World Cup qualification was changed dramatically and a World Cup Qualifier event was introduced in which the top two teams from each of the ICC regions would compete for the final six places in the U-19 World Cup. In addition to this, the Championship was expanded to two divisions due to the increase in the number of regional teams. The first Division Two tournament took place in 2010.

== Tournament results ==
=== Division One ===
| Year | Host(s) | Venue(s) | Result | | |
| Year | Host(s) | Venue(s) | Winner | Margin | Runner-up |
|---|---|---|---|---|---|
| 2001 | Bermuda | various | Canada | Canada won on points fixtures | Bermuda |
| 2003 | Canada | King City | Canada; 8 points | Canada won on points table | Cayman Islands; 6 points |
| 2005 | Canada | King City | United States; 8 points | United States won on points table | Canada; 5 points |
| 2007 | Canada | King City | Bermuda; 8 points | Bermuda won on points table | Canada; 6 points |
| 2009 | Canada | King City | Canada +3.87 NRR | Canada won on net run rate table | United States +2.59 NRR |
| 2011 | United States | Fort Lauderdale and Lauderhill | United States; 10 points | United States won on points table | Canada; 8 points |
| 2013 | Canada | King City | Canada; 6 points | Canada won on points table | United States; 4 points |
| 2015 | Bermuda | Somerset Village and St. David's | Canada; 8 points | Canada won on points table | United States; 2 points |
| 2017 | Canada | King City and Toronto | Canada; 6 points, +1.395 NRR | Canada won on net run rate table | United States; 6 points, +1.162 NRR |
| 2019 | Canada | King City and Toronto | Canada; 8 points | Canada won on points table | United States; 6 points |
| 2023 | Canada | King City and Toronto | United States; 10 points, +4.849 NRR | United States won on net run rate table | Canada; 10 points, +3.500 NRR |

=== Division Two ===
| Year | Host(s) | Venue(s) | Result | | |
| Year | Host(s) | Venue(s) | Winner | Margin | Runner-up |
|---|---|---|---|---|---|
| 2010 | Argentina | Buenos Aires | Argentina +1.84 NRR | Argentina won on net run rate table | Suriname +1.28 NRR |
| 2014 | Bahamas | Nassau | Suriname | Suriname won on net run rate report | Argentina |

== Participating teams (Division One) ==
Legend

- 1st – Champions
- 2nd – Runners-up
- 3rd – Third place
- R1 – First round
- Q – Qualified
- X – Qualified, tournament cancelled
- # – Qualified, withdrew
- — Hosts

| Team | (Bermuda) 2001 | (Canada) 2003 | (Canada) 2005 | (Canada) 2007 | (Canada) 2009 | (United States) 2011 | (Canada) 2013 | (Bermuda) 2015 | (Canada) 2017 | (Canada) 2019 | (United States) 2021 | (Canada) 2023 | (United States) 2025 | Total |
|---|---|---|---|---|---|---|---|---|---|---|---|---|---|---|
| Argentina | R1 | 5th | 5th | 4th | 6th | 6th | — | — | — | 4th | X | 4th | Q | 10 |
| Bahamas | — | — | — | 5th | 5th | 5th | — | — | — | — | — | — | — | 3 |
| Bermuda | 2nd | 3rd | 4th | 1st | 3rd | 3rd | 3rd | 3rd | 3rd | 3rd | X | 3rd | Q | 13 |
| Canada | 1st | 1st | 2nd | 2nd | 1st | 2nd | 1st | 1st | 1st | 1st | X | 2nd | Q | 13 |
| Cayman Islands | — | 2nd | 3rd | 3rd | 4th | 4th | — | — | — | 5th | — | — | — | 6 |
| Suriname | — | — | — | — | — | — | — | # (Note: Suriname qualified for the 2015 tournament, but were forced to withdraw shortly beforehand after failing to secure visas for their players.) | — | — | — | # | # | 0 |
| United States | R1 | 4th | 1st | — | 2nd | 1st | 2nd | 2nd | 2nd | 2nd | X | 1st | Q | 12 |
Defunct teams
| (The Bahamas) Combined Bahamas, Belize and Panama | R1 | Defunct | | | | | | | | | | | | 1 |

== Records ==
Scorecards for some matches from the 2001 tournament are unavailable.

Highest team scores

- 515/8 (50 overs) - United States vs Argentina, 14 August 2023, at Toronto Cricket, Skating and Curling Club, Toronto
- 441/5 (50 overs) – Canada vs Cayman Islands, 12 July 2019, at Maple Leaf Cricket Club, King City.
- 423 all out (49.4 overs) – Canada vs Bahamas, 15 August 2007, at Maple Leaf Cricket Club, King City.
- 382 all out (50 overs) – Bermuda vs United States, 8 August 2001, at Southampton Oval, Hamilton.
- 364/5 (50 overs) – Bermuda vs Argentina, 18 July 2003, at Maple Leaf Cricket Club, King City.
- 347/8 (50 overs) – Canada vs Argentina, 14 July 2003, at Maple Leaf Cricket Club, King City.

Lowest team scores

- 22 all out (13.5 overs) – Argentina vs Bermuda, 12 February 2011, at Brian Piccolo Park, Fort Lauderdale.
- 25 all out (15.2 overs) – Argentina vs Canada, 14 July 2003, at Maple Leaf Cricket Club, King City.
- 29 all out (15.3 overs) – Cayman Islands vs United States, 8 July 2019, at Maple Leaf Cricket Club, King City.
- 33 all out (21 overs) – Argentina vs Canada, 9 July 2019, at Maple Leaf Cricket Club, King City.
- 34 all out (17.4 overs) – Argentina vs United States, 7 February 2011, at Central Broward Regional Park, Lauderhill.

Highest individual scores

- 204 (179 balls) – (Bermuda) Dion Stovell, vs Argentina, 18 July 2003, at Maple Leaf Cricket Club, King City.
- 155 (107 balls) – (Canada) Ruvindu Gunasekera, vs Bahamas, 15 August 2007, at Maple Leaf Cricket Club, King City.
- 151 (104 balls) – (Canada) Ashtan Deosammy, vs Cayman Islands, 12 July 2019, at Maple Leaf Cricket Club, King City.
- 121 (93 balls) – (Canada) Harsh Thaker, vs United States, 10 July 2015, at Somerset Cricket Club Ground, Somerset Village.
- 119 (144 balls) – (Bermuda) Terryn Fray, vs Argentina, 15 August 2007, at Maple Leaf Cricket Club, King City.

Best bowling figures

- 7/3 (5 overs) – (Canada) Pratik Patel, vs Bahamas, 15 August 2007, at Maple Leaf Cricket Club, King City.
- 7/10 (8 overs) – (United States) Raj Vyas, vs Cayman Islands, 8 July 2019, at Maple Leaf Cricket Club, King City.
- 7/12 (7 overs) – (Cayman Islands) Troy Taylor, vs Bermuda, 15 July 2003, at Maple Leaf Cricket Club, King City.
- 7/20 (6.2 overs) – (Canada) Jon Roberts, vs Argentina, 8 August 2001, at St David's Cricket Club, Hamilton.
- 6/3 (3.1 overs) – (Canada) Akash Shah, vs Bahamas, 7 February 2011, at Brian Piccolo Park, Fort Lauderdale.

== See also ==
- ICC Americas Championship
