= Terryn Fray =

Bermudian cricketer (born 1991)

Personal information
- Full name: Terryn Sunil Fray
- Born: 30 June 1991 (age 35); Bermuda
- Batting: Right-handed
- Role: Opening batsman

International information
- National side: Bermuda (2019–present)
- T20I debut (cap 19): 18 August 2019 v United States
- Last T20I: 4 March 2023 v Bahamas

Career statistics
Competition	T20I	FC	LA	T20
Matches	6	1	3	14
Runs scored	19	3	51	40
Batting average	3.80	1.50	25.50	4.44
100s/50s	0/0	0/0	0/0	0/0
Top score	10	2	34*	16
Catches/stumpings	0/–	0/–	1/–	3/–
- Source: ESPNcricinfo, 24 February 2023

Terryn Sunil Fray (born 30 June 1991) is a Bermudian cricketer who plays as a right-handed opening batsman. He represented Bermuda in the 2008 Under-19 Cricket World Cup and played one first-class match, three List A matches and eight Twenty20s for Bermuda from 2009 to 2013. Fray returned to Bermuda's national cricket team in 2018, first as their vice-captain then as captain.

== Early life and youth career ==
Fray's father was Terry Fray, who played domestic cricket in Bermuda as an opening batsman. Fray began playing for Bermuda's under-19s cricket team in the 2007 ICC Americas Under-19 Championship. He played all four matches for the tournament and scored 158 runs at a batting average of 39.50, including 119 runs against Argentina. Fray was then included in Bermuda's 15-man squad for the 2008 Under-19 Cricket World Cup, though he was far less successful and only scored 16 runs across 4 matches. Fray again played for Bermuda at the 2009 ICC Americas Under-19 Championship, this time as the team's captain, and he was the side's top run-scorer for the tournament with 139 runs from five matches.

== International career ==
Fray began playing for Bermuda's senior team in 2009, shortly after the side lost their One Day International status. As a traditional opening batsman with a good temperament for first-class cricket, Fray was expected to be a long-term prospect in Bermuda's team, and he made his debut for Bermuda in the opening week of the 2009-10 Intercontinental Shield. He only made scores of one and two in the match against Uganda and never again played in a first-class match. Following the match he made his List A debut against Uganda, scoring just three runs before being run out. He won an award in the Sports category of the Bermuda Outstanding Teen Awards Programme in March 2010.

In 2010, Fray played two more List A matches and made his Twenty20 debut against the United Arab Emirates, in which he was run out for a diamond duck, having not even faced a single delivery. The first of the List A matches was his best ever performance in a List A match. While Bermuda collapsed to be bowled out for 91 runs, Fray carried his bat through the whole innings and top-scored with 34 runs not out. Fray was initially set to travel with the team to Dubai for another series against the United Arab Emirates, but he was unable to travel for family reasons.

Fray attended college at the University of Wales Institute in Cardiff, Wales and represented the university in cricket by playing for Cardiff MCC University. During this time, he was selected as part of Bermuda's squad for the 2012 ICC World Twenty20 Qualifier, where he only managed to score 17 runs for the tournament, 16 of them coming in one innings against Canada. He was again included in Bermuda's squad for the 2013 ICC World Twenty20 Qualifier, but only played two matches and only scored four runs.

Fray briefly returned to the national side in 2014 and played all seven matches for Bermuda in the 2014 ICC World Cricket League Division Three, scoring 22 runs at an average of 3.66 with two ducks. In 2017 he was invited to play in the Brian Lara Celebrity T20 for an International XI at the opening of the Brian Lara Cricket Academy.

Fray gained leadership opportunities with the national side in 2018 due to an illness to Oliver Pitcher. He made his return to the team in the 2018 ICC World Twenty20 Americas Sub Regional Qualifier as vice-captain to Dion Stovell. He played four matches and scored 60 runs, including 40 runs off of 37 balls in Bermuda's 70-run win over Argentina. In April 2018, he was named as the captain of Bermuda's squad for the 2018 ICC World Cricket League Division Four tournament in Malaysia, switching role with Stovell, who became his vice-captain. He was the leading run-scorer for Bermuda in the tournament, with 191 runs in six matches, and he scored half-centuries against Jersey and Vanuatu.

In August 2019, he was named as the vice-captain of Bermuda's squad for the Regional Finals of the 2018–19 ICC T20 World Cup Americas Qualifier tournament. He made his Twenty20 International (T20I) debut for Bermuda against the United States on 18 August 2019. In September 2019, he was named as the vice-captain of Bermuda's squad for the 2019 ICC T20 World Cup Qualifier tournament in the United Arab Emirates. In November 2019, he was named as the captain of Bermuda's squad for the Cricket World Cup Challenge League B tournament in Oman.

== Domestic career and football ==
Fray plays Bermudian domestic cricket for Somerset. The highlight of his domestic career came when he scored a match-winning century in the 2014 Cup Match. He scored an unbeaten 121 in Somerset's second innings to give them an eight-wicket win. In the 2018 Cup Match, Fray and Chris Douglas broke the record for the largest first-wicket partnership in a Cup Match by scoring 153 runs together. Fray finished his innings with 90 runs from 122 balls.

Fray also plays cricket for Bailey's Bay and plays football for North Village Rams.
