= Andy Mohammed =

West Indian-born American cricketer

Personal information
- Full name: Azurdeen Mohammed
- Born: 10 September 1990 (age 36); Couva, Trinidad
- Batting: Left-handed
- Bowling: Slow left-arm orthodox
- Role: All-rounder

International information
- National side: United States (2010–2012)

Career statistics
Competition	T20
Matches	2
Runs scored	21
Batting average	21.00
100s/50s	0/0
Top score	18*
Catches/stumpings	0/–
- Source: CricketArchive, 13 May 2015

Azurdeen "Andy" Mohammed (born 10 September 1990) is an American cricketer of West Indian origin. A left-handed all-rounder, he made his debut for the U.S. national side in May 2010, having earlier played for the national under-19 team at the 2010 Under-19 World Cup.

== Early life ==
Mohammed was born in Couva, Trinidad, but moved to Guyana with his mother and two older siblings when he was an infant. Playing cricket from an early age, he was given the nickname "Andy" by his aunt due to a perceived resemblance to English fast bowler Andy Caddick. His family moved emigrated to the United States during his teenage years, living first in Orlando, Florida, and then to New York City. He soon began playing underage representative tournaments, and also played basketball for his school, Forest Hills High School in Queens.

== Career ==
Aged 18, Mohammed made his debut for the U.S. under-19 side in July 2009, at the 2009 Americas Under-19 Championship in Canada. Against Bermuda, he was named man of the match after scoring 60 runs and taking 3/15 while bowling. Mohammed retained his place in the side for the 2009 Under-19 World Cup Qualifier, where the U.S. placed fifth to qualify for the 2010 World Cup in New Zealand. His 180 at the World Cup Qualifier placed him behind only Ryan Corns (230) and Shiva Vashishat (203) for his team, and against Afghanistan he scored 90, which at the time was the second-highest score by an American in an under-19 competition.

At the World Cup itself, Mohammed played in all six matches, which each had under-19 One Day International (ODI) status. He again finished third for runs scored at the tournament, behind Greg Sewdial and Steven Taylor, with his innings of 70 in the opening match against Australia the highest by an American at the tournament. Mohammed made his debut for the U.S. senior team later in the year, playing two 20-over games against Jamaica in May. The matches were serving as a warm-up for the 2010 Americas Twenty20 Championship in Bermuda, which Mohammed had already been named in the squad for, but in the final game against Jamaica he split the webbing in his bowling hand, and was forced to miss the Bermuda tour. He did not return to international cricket until the 2011 season, when he played in the annual Auty Cup fixtures against Canada.

In early 2012, Mohammed was selected in the U.S. squad for the 2012 World Twenty20 Qualifier in the United Arab Emirates, where matches had full Twenty20 status. He went on to play two games in the tournament, scoring 18 not out on debut against Namibia and then three against Kenya, in a match where his team was bowled out for 90. His 2012 season also included two games in the 2012 WCL Division Four tournament in Malaysia, against Tanzania and Singapore. Mohammed's most recent international matches for the U.S. came in the 2012 Auty Cup series, which was played in Florida in November of that year.
