= 2005 ICC Americas Under-19 Championship =

2005 Americas Under-19 Championship
- Dates: 8 – 13 August 2005
- Administrator(s): ICC Americas
- Cricket format: 50-over
- Tournament format(s): Round-robin
- Host(s): Canada
- Champions: United States (1st title)
- Participants: 5
- Matches: 10
- Player of the series: (United States) Abhimanyu Rajp
- Most runs: (Canada) Trevin Bastiampillai (128)
- Most wickets: (United States) Abhimanyu Rajp (11)

The 2005 ICC Americas Under-19 Championship was an international cricket tournament held in King City, Ontario, from 8 to 13 August 2005. It was the third edition of the ICC Americas Under-19 Championship, and the second in a row to be held in Canada.

The tournament featured five teams, the same as at the preceding 2003 edition, and the same format was used, a simple round-robin. The United States finished the tournament undefeated to win its first title, and consequently qualified for the 2006 Under-19 World Cup in Sri Lanka. The team had nearly been barred from playing, as part of proposed International Cricket Council (ICC) sanctions against the United States of America Cricket Association (USACA) for maladministration, but the situation was resolved the month before the tournament. Canada was the runner-up at the championship, with the Cayman Islands placing third, Bermuda fourth, and Argentina placing last, again finishing winless. The tournament was affected by rain, with two matches being abandoned and another shortened. A feature of the championship was its low scoring, with only four innings above 200 being recorded from the ten matches played. The tournament's leading runscorer, Canadian batsman Trevin Bastiampillai, was the only player to record more than 100 runs, while the leading wicket-taker, and MVP of the tournament was American bowler Abhimanyu Rajp, who took two five-wicket hauls.

== Fixtures ==
Qualified for the 2006 Under-19 World Cup.

Team	Pld	W	L	T	Ab	Pts	NRR
United States	4	4	0	0	0	8	+2.566
Canada	4	2	1	0	1	5	+1.084
Cayman Islands	4	1	2	0	1	3	–0.058
Bermuda	4	1	2	0	1	3	–0.853
Argentina	4	0	3	0	1	0	–3.564

8 August
Scorecard

Argentina; 92 (26.5 overs)	v	Bermuda; 93/1 (16.2 overs)

Bermuda won by 9 wickets
Maple Leaf North-West Ground, King City
Player of the match: Stefan Kelly (Ber)

8 August
Scorecard

United States; 246 (50 overs)	v	Canada; 207 (46.1 overs)

United States won by 39 runs
Maple Leaf South-West Ground, King City
Player of the match: Ravi Timbawala (USA)

9 August
Scorecard

Cayman Islands; 286/6 (50 overs)	v	Argentina; 113 (32.3 overs)

Cayman Islands won by 173 runs
Maple Leaf South-West Ground, King City
Player of the match: Marc Chin (Cay)

9 August
Scorecard

Bermuda; 86 (36.2 overs)	v	United States; 89/2 (16.5 overs)

United States won by 8 wickets
Maple Leaf North-East Ground, King City
Player of the match: Abhimanyu Rajp (USA)

10 August
Scorecard

Argentina; 105 (38.3 overs)	v	United States; 109/3 (20.2 overs)

United States won by 7 wickets
Maple Leaf South-West Ground, King City
Player of the match: Abhimanyu Rajp (USA)

10 August
Scorecard

Cayman Islands; 143/8 (50 overs)	v	Canada; 121/1 (18 overs)

Canada won by 9 wickets (DL)
Maple Leaf North-East Ground, King City
Player of the match: Kenneth Carto (Can)

- Canada's target was 121 runs in 36 overs.

11 August
Scorecard

Bermuda	v	Cayman Islands

Match abandoned

11 August
Scorecard

Argentina	v	Canada

Match abandoned

13 August
Scorecard

Canada; 239/8 (50 overs)	v	Bermuda; 140 (42.5 overs)

Canada won by 99 runs
Maple Leaf South-West Ground, King City
Player of the match: Trevin Bastiampillai (Can)

13 August
Scorecard

Cayman Islands; 86 (40.3 overs)	v	United States; 87/4 (19.2 overs)

United States won by 6 wickets
Maple Leaf South-West Ground, King City
Player of the match: Hemant Punoo (USA)

== Statistics ==
=== Most runs ===
The top five runscorers are included in this table, ranked by runs scored and then by batting average.

Player	Team	Runs	Inns	Avg	Highest	100s	50s
Trevin Bastiampillai	Canada	128	3	128.00	110*	1	0
Kenneth Carto	Canada	93	3	46.50	50*	0	1
Hemant Punoo	United States	87	4	43.50	42*	0	0
Ravi Timbawala	United States	81	4	27.00	67	0	1
Waqas Junaid	Canada	80	3	40.00	43	0	0

Source: CricketArchive

=== Most wickets ===
The top five wicket takers are listed in this table, ranked by wickets taken and then by bowling average.

Player	Team	Overs	Wkts	Ave	SR	Econ	BBI
Abhimanyu Rajp	United States	31.3	11	8.72	17.18	3.04	5/7
Marc Chin	Cayman Islands	19.2	7	13.14	16.57	4.75	5/32
Stefan Kelly	Bermuda	24.5	7	13.71	21.28	3.86	4/22
Mohammad Rehman	United States	36.0	7	15.00	30.85	2.91	4/19
Hemant Punoo	United States	33.3	6	12.33	33.50	2.20	4/12

Source: CricketArchive
