= 2017 ICC Americas Under-19 Championship =

2017 Americas Under-19 Championship
- Dates: 17 – 23 July 2017
- Administrator: ICC Americas
- Cricket format: 50-over
- Tournament format: Double round-robin
- Host: Canada
- Champions: Canada (6th title)
- Participants: 3
- Matches: 6

The 2017 ICC Americas Under-19 Championship was an international cricket tournament held in Canada, from 17 to 23 July 2017. It was the ninth edition of the ICC Americas Under-19 Championship, and the first held in Canada since 2013. Canada U19 won the tournament on net run rate (NRR) and advanced to the 2018 Under-19 World Cup.

== Teams ==
The 2017 version of the tournament featured three teams. The winner qualified for the 2018 Under-19 Cricket World Cup.

Team
Bermuda
Canada
United States

== Venues ==
The following venues were used for the tournament:

- Maple Leaf Cricket Club, King City, Ontario, Canada
- Toronto Cricket, Skating and Curling Club, Toronto, Ontario, Canada

== Squads ==
The following players were selected for the tournament:

Bermuda Coach: Clay Smith	Canada Coach: Farooq Kirmani	United States Coach: Pubudu Dassanayake
Dalin Richardson (c); Nzari Paynter (vc); Ras Solomon Burrows; Rudi Butterfield; Jabari Darrell; Q'Shai Darrell; Cameron Jeffers; Jaiden Manders; Nirobi Smith Mills; Jade Morrissey; Najiyah Raynor; Alje Richardson; Marcus Scotland; Amori Dean Simons	Bhavindu Adhihetty (c); Kunwar Singh Chana; Ashtan Deosammy; Akash Gill; Faisal Jamkhandi; Rishiv Joshi; Arslan Khan; Emmanuel Khohkar; Kavian Naress; Aran Pathmanathan; Pieter Christiaan Pretorius; Krishen Samuel; Rommel Shahzad; Pranav Sharma	Arjun Patel (c); Sohan Bhat; Mohak Buch; Sam Das; Smit Doshi; Harish Easwaraiah; Karthik Gattepalli; ~~Abhishek Kattuparambil~~; Awais Mubarak; Vivek Narayan; Keshav Pabbisetty; Gaurav Patanker; Sahil Patel; Aravind Patnam; Raymond Ramrattan; ~~Alexander Shoff~~

Alexander Shoff and Abhishek Kattuparambil were originally named to the USA squad, but were unable to participate due to injury. Aravind Patnam and Harish Easwaraiah were named to the squad as replacements.

== Round-robin ==
17 July 2017
10:30 am
Scorecard

Bermuda; 103/8 (20 overs)	v	United States; 104/4 (16.3 overs)

United States Under-19s won by 6 wickets
Maple Leaf Cricket Club, King City, Ontario, Canada
Player of the match: Arjun Patel (USA)

- United States Under-19s won the toss and elected to field.
- The match was reduced to 20 overs per side due to a wet outfield.

18 July 2017
10:30 am
Scorecard

Canada; 63 (47.5 overs)	v	United States; 67/6 (25.4 overs)

United States Under-19s won by 4 wickets
Maple Leaf Cricket Club, King City
Player of the match: Keshav Pabbisetty (USA)

- United States Under-19s won the toss and elected to field.

19 July 2017
10:30 am
Scorecard

Canada; 229/8 (50 overs)	v	Bermuda; 88 (35.3 overs)

Canada Under-19s won by 141 runs
Maple Leaf Cricket Club, King City
Player of the match: Arslan Khan (Can)

- Bermuda Under-19s won the toss and elected to field.

21 July 2017
10:30 am
Scorecard

United States; 220 (50 overs)	v	Bermuda; 102 (36.5 overs)

United States Under-19s won by 118 runs
Toronto Cricket, Skating and Curling Club, Toronto
Player of the match: Sahil Patel (USA)

- United States Under-19s won the toss and elected to bat.

22 July 2017
10:30 am
Scorecard

Bermuda; 44 (27.3 overs)	v	Canada; 45/2 (4 overs)

Canada Under-19s won by 8 wickets
Maple Leaf Cricket Club, King City
Player of the match: Akash Gill (Can)

- Bermuda Under-19s won the toss and elected to bat.

23 July 2017
10:30 am
Scorecard

United States; 132 (47 overs)	v	Canada; 133/6 (39.2 overs)

Canada Under-19s won by 4 wickets
Toronto Cricket, Skating and Curling Club, Toronto
Player of the match: Arslan Khan (Can)

- Canada Under-19s won the toss and elected to field.

== Final standings ==
Qualified for the 2018 Under-19 World Cup.

Team	Pld	W	L	T	NR	Pts	NRR
Canada	4	3	1	0	0	6	+1.305
United States	4	3	1	0	0	6	+1.162
Bermuda	4	0	4	0	0	0	−2.989
