= 2015 ICC Americas Under-19 Championship =

2015 Americas Under-19 Championship
- Dates: 5 – 11 July 2015
- Administrator: ICC Americas
- Cricket format: 50-over
- Tournament format: Double round-robin
- Host: Bermuda
- Champions: Canada
- Participants: 4
- Matches: 6
- Most runs: (Canada) Harsh Thaker (261)
- Most wickets: (Bermuda) Chare Smith (13)

The 2015 ICC Americas Under-19 Championship was an international cricket tournament held in Bermuda, from 5 to 11 July 2015. It was the eighth edition of the ICC Americas Under-19 Championship, and the first held in Bermuda since the inaugural tournament in 2001.

Canada won the title for a fifth time, finishing the tournament undefeated to qualify directly for the 2016 Under-19 World Cup. The United States were the runner-up, finishing ahead of Bermuda on net run rate to proceed to the 2015 World Cup Qualifier, where the winner will also qualify for the World Cup. The tournament was originally going to involve a fourth team, Suriname, which would have been making its maiden appearance. However, Suriname withdrew from the tournament after failing to secure transit visas for its players.

== Teams ==
The 2015 tournament was originally going to feature four teams, one more than the previous tournament in Canada. Suriname, which withdrew, qualified by winning the 2014 Division Two tournament, and would have made its tournament debut, with teams at the tournament being the same as at the senior-level 2015 Americas Twenty20 Championship in Indiana. Because of the lateness of Suriname's withdrawal, the Division Two runner-up, Argentina, was unable to be invited as a replacement.

Team	Mode of qualification
Bermuda	3rd place, 2013 Americas Under-19 Championship
Canada	Winner, 2013 Americas Under-19 Championship
~~Suriname~~	Winner, 2014 Americas Under-19 Championship Division Two
United States	Runner-up, 2013 Americas Under-19 Championship

== Preparation ==
The United States named their 14-man squad for the tournament in early June, following a training camp in Los Angeles. The team was coached by Thiru Kumaran, a former Indian ODI representative and ex-assistant coach of the U.S. senior national side.

== Fixtures ==
Qualified for the 2016 Under-19 World Cup.
Qualified for 2015 Under-19 World Cup Qualifier.

Team	Pld	W	L	T	NR	Pts	NRR
Canada	4	4	0	0	0	6	+0.995
United States	4	1	3	0	0	2	–0.124
Bermuda	4	1	3	0	0	2	–1.057

5 July
11:00
Scorecard

United States; 255 (50 overs)	v	Bermuda; 119 (22.3 overs)

United States won by 136 runs
Somerset Cricket Club, Somerset Village

- United States won the toss and elected to bat.

6 July
11:00
Scorecard

Canada; 257/7 (50 overs)	v	Bermuda; 186 (46.3 overs)

Canada won by 71 runs
St David's Cricket Club, St David's

- Bermuda won the toss and elected to bowl.

7 July
11:00
Scorecard

Canada; 241 (48.1 overs)	v	United States; 240 (49.2 overs)

Canada won by 1 run
Somerset Cricket Club, Somerset Village

- Canada won the toss and elected to bat.

9 July
11:00
Scorecard

United States; 109 (30 overs)	v	Bermuda; 110/9 (22.2 overs)

Bermuda won by 1 wicket
St David's Cricket Club, St David's

- United States won the toss and elected to bat.

10 July
11:00
Scorecard

Canada; 289/8 (50 overs)	v	United States; 252/9 (50 overs)

Canada won by 37 runs
Somerset Cricket Club, Somerset Village

- Canada won the toss and elected to bat.

11 July
11:00
Scorecard

Canada; 202 (49.1 overs)	v	Bermuda; 112 (36.2 overs)

Canada won by 90 runs
St David's Cricket Club, St David's

- Bermuda won the toss and elected to bowl.

== Statistics ==
=== Most runs ===
The top five runscorers are included in this table, ranked by runs scored and then by batting average.

Player	Team	Runs	Inns	Avg	Highest	100s	50s
Harsh Thaker	Canada	261	4	65.25	121	1	1
Kushal Ganji	United States	141	4	35.25	110	1	0
Arslan Khan	Canada	140	3	46.67	94	0	1
Thursaanth Anantharajah	Canada	131	4	32.75	58	0	1
Alex Shoff	United States	129	3	43.00	103	1	0

Source: CricHQ

=== Most wickets ===
The top five wicket takers are listed in this table, ranked by wickets taken and then by bowling average.

Player	Team	Overs	Wkts	Ave	SR	Econ	BBI
Chare Smith	Bermuda	36.1	13	10.15	16.69	3.65	5/27
Keifer Shill	United States	37.0	11	17.27	20.18	5.14	6/46
Muhammad Khan	Canada	29.0	10	15.70	17.40	5.41	5/53
Karan Patel	United States	23.1	8	14.13	17.38	4.88	4/40
Abdul Haseeb	Canada	32.3	8	17.00	24.38	4.18	3/18

Source: CricHQ
