= Hammad Shahid =

American cricketer

Personal information
- Born: December 7, 1991 (age 34); Anaheim, California, United States
- Height: 6 ft 5 in (1.96 m)
- Batting: Right-handed
- Bowling: Right-arm fast
- Role: Bowler

International information
- National side: United States (2012–2015)

Career statistics
Competition	T20
Matches	6
Runs scored	5
Batting average	–
100s/50s	0/0
Top score	5*
Balls bowled	120
Wickets	7
Bowling average	19.42
5 wickets in innings	0
10 wickets in match	0
Best bowling	3/22
Catches/stumpings	4/–
- Source: CricketArchive, September 22, 2015

Hammad Shahid (born December 7, 1991) is an American cricketer who made his debut for the United States national cricket team in November 2012. A right-arm fast bowler who bats right-handed, he earlier appeared for the national under-19 side at the 2010 Under-19 World Cup.

== Biography ==
Shahid was born in Anaheim, California, but his parents, Pakistani immigrants, moved to Karachi when he was an infant. However, they returned to California when he was six years old, settling in Cypress. Shahid attended Cypress High School, playing basketball for the school team, and played club cricket in the Southern California Cricket Association (SCCA). His debut for the U.S. under-19 team came when he was 17, at the 2009 Under-19 World Cup Qualifier in Canada. There, he took six wickets from six matches, with a best of 2/12 from 7.4 overs against Vanuatu. At the 2010 World Cup in New Zealand, Shahid featured in four matches, all of which had under-19 One Day International (ODI) status. His best figures came in the final match of the tournament, the 15th-place playoff against Afghanistan, where he took 3/18 from seven overs to be named man of the match. Shahid was still young enough to play at the 2011 Under-19 World Cup Qualifier, but the U.S. failed to qualify for the 2012 World Cup (where he would have been ineligible).

In November 2012, Shahid was one of seven uncapped players selected in the United States squad for the annual Auty Cup series against Canada. He was only recalled to the national squad in April 2015, for the 2015 Americas Twenty20 Championship the following month. He was one of only four American-born players in the squad, the others being Akeem Dodson, Jasdeep Singh, and Steven Taylor. At the tournament, Shahid played in four of a possible six matches, but failed to take any wickets. Despite this, he was retained in the U.S. squad for the 2015 World Twenty20 Qualifier in Ireland and Scotland, and went on to make his formal Twenty20 debut in the opening match of the tournament against Nepal.

In June 2021, he was selected to take part in the Minor League Cricket tournament in the United States following the players' draft.
