= Chris Kent =

Chris or Christopher Kent may refer to:

- Alf Kjellin (1920–1988), Swedish film actor and director who also used the name Christopher Kent
- Christopher Corey Smith, voice actor also known as Chris Kent
- Christopher Kent (cricketer) (born 1991), Papua New Guinean cricketer
- Stephen Clarke (writer) (born 1958), real name Chris Kent, British journalist and novelist
- Lor-Zod, Kryptonian boy featured in the comic book Action Comics
