= Abhimanyu Rajp =

American cricketer

Personal information
- Full name: Abhimanyu Rajp (Abhi)
- Born: March 8, 1986 (age 40); Ludhiana, Punjab, India
- Batting: Right-handed
- Bowling: Right-arm Off-spin
- Role: Bowler

International information
- National side: United States

Domestic team information
- Years: Team
- 2005: United States national under-19 cricket team
- 2012: United States national cricket team
- 2020: Los Angeles Lashings
- Source: ESPNcricinfo, August 5 2012

Abhimanyu Rajp (born March 8, 1986) is an American cricketer. Rajp is a right-arm off-spin bowler and a right handed batsman. Rajp represented the United States national cricket team at various levels from 2005 till 2015 for the USA Cricket. He currently heads Los Angeles Cricket, a California nonprofit building the sport of cricket locally. Rajp also represents the Los Angeles Lashings in Minor League Cricket, USA.

== Career ==
=== Early years ===
Rajp was born in Ludhiana, Punjab, India. Along with being primarily a right-handed off-spinner he is also a handy batsman. He started playing cricket professionally at an early age and represented his city Ludhiana at the U-14 and U-16 district levels. Later, Rajp, who was 14 at the time, along with his family moved to the United States of America in the year 2000. Rajp, quickly transitioned into the Under-17 and Under-19 cricket scene in the US and became one of the All-stars of the country by 2004. Soon after, Rajp was labelled as one to watch for the future by various critics in the USA cricket circuit for good measure.

=== Under-19 career ===
Rajp captained the Southern California Cricket Association's Under-19 team and the USA's South West / West Region Under-19 team from 2004 to 2006. Rajp was part of the first generation of USA cricketers in the Under-19 structure of USA that started with the first Under-19 National Tournament held in Los Angeles in 2004. Rajp went on to make the national under-19 team in 2005.

Rajp first represented the United States national cricket team at the 2005 ICC Americas Under-19 Championship in 2005 against Canada, Bermuda, Cayman Islands and Argentina. Rajp was particularly successful against Bermuda, taking 5 for 7, due to which Bermuda was all out for a rather small target of 87 and USA coasted to victory by eight wickets. The very next day, Rajp took another five-for (5 for 45), against Argentina in a seven-wicket victory before USA registered its final victory of the tour against Cayman Islands to seal a sweep of the tournament and made history by clinching a spot in the 2006 ICC Under-19 Cricket World Cup for the first time, in Sri Lanka. At that tournament, Rajp became the first American cricketer to become the first MVP of a U-19 tournament involving Team USA. He grabbed the MVP honors as well as the Best Bowler of the tournament along with two man of the match awards, ending the tournament with 11 wickets.

Rajp's major international test came in the form of the 2006 ICC Under-19 Cricket World Cup in Sri Lanka, in which he was promoted to be the vice-captain of the United States Under-19 cricket team due to his performances at the ICC Americas Under-19 Championship and National Under-19 Tournaments. Rajp had a successful World Cup campaign and finished the tournament as one of the leading wicket takers for the US and also landed himself in the top 10 wicket takers for the 2006 edition (in number of wickets taken). His most notable performance came against an ICC full-member nation, New Zealand, when he took the first USA U19 five-wicket haul for the USA against a full member nation (NZ). United States of America Cricket Association's administration problems soon after the 2006 ICC Under-19 Cricket World Cup resulted in a two-year ban imposed by cricket's governing body, International Cricket Council. Rajp's name slowly faded away on the national circuit and was off the radar for the next few years before making his resurgence in 2010.

=== USA Domestic Cricket ===
Rajp has been one of the top players in the USA domestic cricket circuit for a number of years. He plays in the Southern California Cricket Association, which is based in Los Angeles, California and represents the South West Region in USA National Cricket Tournaments. He has had a good showing in domestic tournaments through the years; with the most notable being the best bowler at the 2010 Western Conference, where he also created a national record for taking 7/35 in one innings, at a national tournament game against the Central East region. Later he went on to become the best bowler for the second time in a calendar year and this time it was at the 2010 United States Senior National tournament. Rajp, was called for national trials in 2012 to earn a spot in the United States national cricket team. He would later go one to make the USA National Squad in 2012. Rajp clinched the best bowler honors for the 2019 Western Regional Tournament help at Sepulveda Basin Cricket Complex in Van Nuys, CA.

In June 2021, he was selected to take part in the Minor League Cricket tournament in the United States following the players' draft.

=== International career ===
Rajp made his debut in 2012 when he was selected as to be a part of the United States national cricket team at the 2012 ICC World Twenty20 Qualifier in the UAE in March 2012. Accomplishing a rare feet, Rajp, on his Debut, took a first ball wicket against Italy for USA. Rajp, in his debut tournament, finished at the top in the wickets department for his team, and in the top ten on the list of highest wicket takers for the 2012 tournament edition (in number of wickets taken).

Awarding his success at the 2012 ICC World Twenty20 Qualifier the selectors picked Rajp as one of the members of the United States national cricket team for the 2012 ICC World Cricket League Division Four which took place from September 3 to 10, 2012 in Malaysia. The United States national cricket team was successful in gaining promotion to 2013 ICC World Cricket League Division Three to be held in Bermuda from April 28 to May 5, 2013. Rajp, finished as one of the top wicket takers for USA in the Twenty20 however, was not chosen to be a part of that team traveling to Bermuda for Division Three, 50 over format, Following a spree of changes in the USA Squad after the team's successful triumph in the 2013 ICC World Cricket League Americas Region Twenty20 Division One where USA swept the tournament to gain qualification for the 2013 ICC World Twenty20 Qualifier in the UAE. Rajp finished as one of the top wicket takes for USA for the 2013 edition.

USA Squad to Toronto, Canada for the 2013 edition of the Auty Cup (annual fixture vs Canada) included Rajp who was hailed by critics as one of the stand out performers for the USA. Although, his aggressive bowling as not enough for the US to win the Auty Cup title, it surely helped his case to become a regular fixture in the USA squad.

== See also ==
- ICC Americas Under-19 Championship
- 2006 ICC Under-19 Cricket World Cup
- 2012 ICC World Twenty20 Qualifier
- 2012 ICC World Cricket League Division Four
- 2013 ICC World Cricket League Division Three
