= Dion Stovell =

Bermudian cricketer (born 1984)

Personal information
- Full name: Dion Curt Stovell
- Born: 12 September 1984 (age 42); Bermuda
- Batting: Right-handed
- Bowling: Right-arm offbreak
- Relatives: Jamar Stovel (cousin)

International information
- National side: Bermuda (2019–present)
- T20I debut (cap 27): 25 August 2019 v Cayman Islands
- Last T20I: 14 November 2021 v Argentina

Career statistics
Competition	T20I	LA	T20
Matches	12	8	29
Runs scored	75	288	347
Batting average	9.37	36.00	13.88
100s/50s	–/–	–/2	–/1
Top score	23	77	56
Balls bowled	121	296	481
Wickets	5	9	24
Bowling average	32.60	30.33	23.54
5 wickets in innings	–	–	–
10 wickets in match	–	–	–
Best bowling	2/21	3/25	4/25
Catches/stumpings	6/–	3/–	9/–
- Source: ESPNcricinfo, 29 November 2022

Dion Curt Stovell (born 12 August 1984) is a Bermudian cricketer and football player. Stovell is a right-handed batsman who bowls right-arm off break. He was born in Bermuda. Stovell also played football as a striker for Somerset Trojans.

== Cricket career ==
Stovell played for Bermuda in both the 2001 and 2003 editions of the ICC Americas Under-19 Championship. He was named the man of the match in a 2003 match against Argentina U-19, having scored 204 runs out of Bermuda's total of 364. Bermuda won the match by 302 runs.

Stovell was selected in Bermuda's squad for the 2011 World Cricket League Division Two in the United Arab Emirates. It was during this tournament that Stovell made his List A debut against Papua New Guinea. On debut, he took two wickets and scored 42 runs. In Bermuda's second match against Hong Kong, he took his career-best List A bowling figures of 3/25. In a match against Namibia, Stovell scored 73 runs, the most in the match, for Bermuda, but Bermuda still lost the match by 86 runs after being bowled out in the 43rd over. Bermuda's coach, David Moore, expressed disappointment after the match over Stovell not staying at the crease for longer. In the next match against the United Arab Emirates Stovell again top-scored for Bermuda with 77, his highest List A score, but again Bermuda failed to win. Stovell finished the tournament as Bermuda's leading run-scorer and also took the second-most wickets, but Bermuda finished the tournament in last place and were relegated.

Stovell was selected as part of Bermuda's squad for the 2012 World Twenty20 Qualifier, also in the United Arab Emirates. In his Twenty20 debut for Bermuda against Denmark he scored 56, still his highest score in a Twenty20 match. Later in the tournament he also took his career-best bowling figures of 4/25 from 4 overs against Nepal. He was Bermuda's leading wicket-taker for the tournament with 14 wickets at an average of 16.42 runs per wicket, and he was also their most economical bowler, only conceding 6.38 runs per over.

In 2013 Stovell played for Bermuda at both the World Cricket League Division Three in Bermuda and the World Twenty20 Qualifier in the United Arab Emirates. In the WCL Division Three he struggled with the bat and only scored 52 runs at an average of 10.40. In the opening match of the World Twenty20 Qualifier he was named the man of the match as Bermuda's top run-scorer, but he only finished the tournament with a batting average of 14.12. He played seven matches for Bermuda in the 2014 World Cricket League Division Three and six matches in the 2016 World Cricket League Division Four.

In April 2018, he was named as the vice-captain of Bermuda's squad for the 2018 ICC World Cricket League Division Four tournament in Malaysia. He was the leading wicket-taker for Bermuda in the tournament, with twelve dismissals in six matches.

In August 2019, he was named as the captain of Bermuda's squad for the Regional Finals of the 2018–19 ICC T20 World Cup Americas Qualifier tournament. He made his Twenty20 International (T20I) debut for Bermuda against the Cayman Islands on 25 August 2019.

In September 2019, he was named as the captain of Bermuda's squad for the 2019 ICC T20 World Cup Qualifier tournament in the United Arab Emirates. In November 2019, he was named in Bermuda's squad for the Cricket World Cup Challenge League B tournament in Oman.

In October 2021, he was named in Bermuda's squad for the 2021 ICC Men's T20 World Cup Americas Qualifier tournament in Antigua.
