= Argentina national under-19 cricket team =

Cricket team

Argentina Under-19s
- Nickname: Sunny Ones

Personnel
- Captain: Tomas Rossi
- Coach: Steven Kruger
- Owner: Argentine Cricket Association (ACA)

History
- List A debut: v. Bermuda Maple Leaf Cricket Club Ontario, Canada; 8 August 2005

International Cricket Council
- ICC status: Associate (1974; 52 years ago)
- ICC region: Americas

The Argentina national under-19 cricket team represents the country of Argentina in under-19 international cricket. The team have not yet qualified for the Under-19 Cricket World Cup.

== Current squad ==
The following players are recently called up for the 2026 Under-19 Cricket World Cup qualification.

As of 29 April 2025

Name	Date of birth	Batting style	Bowling style
Owen Krischbaum (Captain)		Right hand bat	
Ignacio Mosquera		Right hand bat	Right arm medium
Dimas Del Rio		Right hand bat	Right arm medium
Felipe Pini		Right Hand bat	Right arm medium
Egon Ferioli		Right hand bat	Wicketkeeper
Lucas Pereyra (Vice-Captain)		Right Hand bat	Right arm medium
Maximo Veliz		Right hand bat	Right arm medium
Lucas Migliorelli		Right hand bat	Left arm fast medium
Tomas Rossi		Right hand bat	Right arm medium
Felipe Neves		Right hand bat	
Tom Torchiaro		Right hand bat	Right arm medium
Theo Vreugdenhil		Right hand bat	Right arm medium
Lucas Rossi		Right hand bat	Right arm medium
Julian Cardesa		Right hand bat	Right arm medium

== Records & statistics ==
International match summary

As of 7 August 2024

Playing records
Format	M	W	L	T	D/NR	Inaugural match
Youth One Day Internationals	18	3	15	0	0	8 August 2005

As of 7 August 2024

Records against other national sides
Associate members
Opponent	M	W	L	T	NR	First match	First win
Bahamas	3	2	1	0	0	17 August 2007	17 August 2007
Bermuda	4	0	4	0	0	15 August 2007	
Canada	4	0	4	0	0	14 August 2007	
Cayman Islands	4	1	3	0	0	13 August 2007	14 July 2019
United States	3	0	3	0	0	7 July 2009	

== Competitive records ==
=== ICC U19 Cricket World Cup ===
Argentina's U19 World Cup Record
Year	Result	Pos	№	Pld	W	L	T	NR
(Australia) 1988	Did not qualify							
(South Africa) 1998	Did not qualify							
(Sri Lanka) 2000	Did not qualify							
(New Zealand) 2002	Did not qualify							
(Bangladesh) 2004	Did not qualify							
(Sri Lanka) 2006	Did not qualify							
(Malaysia) 2008	Did not qualify							
(New Zealand) 2010	Did not qualify							
(Australia) 2012	Did not qualify							
(United Arab Emirates) 2014	Did not qualify							
(Bangladesh) 2016	Did not qualify							
(New Zealand) 2018	Did not qualify							
(South Africa) 2020	Did not qualify							
(Cricket West Indies) 2022	Did not qualify							
(South Africa) 2024	Did not qualify							
(Zimbabwe) (Namibia) 2026	To be determined							
Total	0 Title	0	0	0	0	0	0	0

=== ICC Americas Under-19 Championship ===
ICC Americas Under-19 Championship records
Year	Round	Position	GP	W	L	T	NR
(Bermuda) 2001	The details information of the tournament have not been found						
(Canada) 2003	The details information of the tournament have not been found						
(Canada) 2005	Round-robin	5/5	4	0	3	0	1
(Canada) 2007	The details information of the tournament have not been found						
(Canada) 2009	Round-robin	6/6	5	0	5	0	0
(United States) 2011	The details information of the tournament have not been found						
(Canada) 2013	The details information of the tournament have not been found						
(Bermuda) 2015	Did not participate						
(Canada) 2017	Did not participate						
Total	2/9	–	9	0	8	0	1

=== ICC Under-19 Cricket World Cup qualification ===
ICC Under-19 Cricket World Cup qualification records
Year	Round	Position	GP	W	L	T	NR
(Canada) 2020	DNQ	–	4	1	3	0	0
(United States) 2022	The tournament was cancelled due to the COVID-19 pandemic.						
(Canada) 2024	DNQ	–	6	0	5	0	1
(United States) 2026	To be determined						
2028	To be determined						
Total	2/5	–	10	1	8	0	1
