= Greg Sewdial =

American cricketer

Personal information
- Full name: Gregory Raj Sewdial
- Born: September 6, 1991 (age 35); The Bronx, New York, United States
- Batting: Right-handed
- Bowling: Right-arm off spin

International information
- National side: United States (2008)

Career statistics
Competition	List A
Matches	2
Runs scored	18
Batting average	18.00
100s/50s	0/0
Top score	18*
Catches/stumpings	2/–
- Source: CricketArchive, October 7, 2015

Gregory Raj Sewdial (born 6 September 1991) is an American cricketer who played a single tournament for the U.S. national team in 2008.

Born in The Bronx to a Guyanese immigrant father, Sewdial attended The Metropolitan High School, and made his debut for the U.S. senior team at the age of 17. He played two matches for the team during the 2008–09 season of the WICB Cup, where matches held list-A status. In the first of those, against Trinidad and Tobago, he was out for a duck, while against the Combined Campuses and Colleges he made 18 not out. Sewdial did not debut for the national under-19 side until the following year, at the 2009 Americas Under-19 Championship. Later in the year, Sewdial also played at the 2009 Under-19 World Cup Qualifier in Canada, which saw the U.S. qualify for the 2010 Under-19 World Cup in New Zealand.

At the 2010 World Cup, Sewdial was appointed vice-captain to Shiva Vashishat. He went on to play in all six of his team's matches, and was the leading runscorer for the U.S., finishing with 125 runs at an average of 31.25. Aged 18 at the time of the World Cup, Sewdial remained eligible for the under-19 team for another year, and consequently was able to play at the 2011 World Cup Qualifier in Ireland. Appointed team captain, he was once again amongst the leading runscorers for the U.S., and against Kenya scored 68 from 103 balls, which saw him named man of the match. Sewdial has not been selected in any further national squads since that tournament, and has been hampered by recurring ankle injuries, which have required several surgeries.
