= Darren Ramsammy =

Canadian cricketer (born 1992)

Personal information
- Full name: Darren Roy Ramsammy
- Born: 23 June 1992 (age 34)
- Batting: Right-handed
- Role: Wicketkeeper

International information
- National side: Canada
- Only ODI (cap 80): 11 July 2012 v Scotland

Career statistics
Competition	ODI
Matches	1
Runs scored	0
Batting average	0
100s/50s	0/0
Top score	0
Catches/stumpings	0/0
- Source: Cricinfo, 30 April 2023

Darren Ramsammy (born 23 June 1992) is a former Canadian international cricketer. He played a single ODI for Canada during the World Cricket League. He also represented Canada at the 2011 Under-19 Cricket World Cup Qualifier. His father Roy Ramsammy represented Canada at the ICC Trophy.
