= Lodge Road, Coleraine =

Cricket ground in Northern Ireland

Coordinates: 55°07′21.85″N 6°39′30.24″W

Lodge Road
- Location: Coleraine, Northern Ireland
- As of 28 August 2011; Source: Ground profile

Lodge Road is a cricket ground in Coleraine, Northern Ireland and the home of Coleraine Cricket Club. In 1987, it hosted a first-class match between Ireland and Scotland, a match which ended in a draw.

In 2011, it was one of the venues for the 2011 ICC Under-19 Cricket World Cup Qualifier.

The ground is also used to host rugby games.
