= Bhavindu Adhihetty =

Canadian cricketer (born 2000)

Personal information
- Born: 29 February 2000 (age 26); Colombo, Sri Lanka
- Source: Cricinfo, 23 May 2017

Bhavindu Adhihetty (born 29 February 2000) is a Canadian cricketer. He played for Canada in the 2017 ICC World Cricket League Division Three tournament in May 2017. Prior to the Division 3 tournament, he was part of Canada's squad for the 2016 Under-19 Cricket World Cup. In July 2017, he was the captain of Canada's U19 squad for the 2017 ICC Americas Under-19 Championship.

In January 2018, he was named in Canada's squad for the 2018 ICC World Cricket League Division Two tournament. He made his List A debut for Canada on 8 February 2018. In April 2019, he was named in Canada's squad for the 2019 ICC World Cricket League Division Two tournament in Namibia.
