= Thirunavukkarasu Kumaran =

Indian cricketer (born 1975)

Personal information
- Full name: Thirunavukkarasu Kumaran
- Born: 30 December 1975 (age 50); Chennai, Tamil Nadu, India
- Batting: Right-handed
- Bowling: Right-arm medium
- Role: Bowler
- Source: ESPNcricinfo, 17 May 2008

Thirunavukkarasu Kumaran (born 30 December 1975 in Chennai, Tamil Nadu), also known as 'Kenny' and 'Thiru Kumaran', is an Indian First Class cricketer and cricket coach. He is a right-handed batsman and a right-arm medium-pace bowler. He was a member of Indian World Team in the Indian Cricket League Twenty20 competition.

== Playing career ==
Kumaran was a product of the MRF Pace Foundation under the personal training from Dennis Lillee. He also had some training at the Australian Cricket Academy in Adelaide.

Kumaran got selected into the national ODI team after an exception haul of 10 wickets in an Irani Trophy match against Karnataka at Bangalore in the 1999/2000 domestic season.

He was picked for the Australian tour where he performed well in the first-class games prior to the first Test. However Ajit Agarkar was preferred over him to play in the series. He took this disappointment in his stride, but another one followed when he was one of the five players replaced for Carlton & United one-day series.

He performed averagely in the 8 ODI's that he played and was never picked to play for India again. He was one of many medium pacers Indian selectors tried out in the late 90's to lend support to Javagal Srinath and Venkatesh Prasad.

== ICL career ==
He joined the rebel Indian Cricket League during its inception in 2007 and was one of the stand-out performers for the Chennai Superstars. He took an astonishing 6 for 21 on debut – a league record – and also has the best strike (12.69) in the 20-over tournament. However, he accepted the BCCI's amnesty offer and quit the league in 2009, along with a host of other Indian players.

== Coaching career ==
After retiring from playing, Kumaran emigrated to the United States. He was an assistant coach of the U.S. national side (under Robin Singh) at the 2012 WCL Division Four and the 2013 Americas Twenty20 tournaments and was the caretaker coach (in Singh's absence) for 2013 WCL Division Three tournament.

Kumaran coached the national under-19 team at the 2015 Americas Under-19 Championship. As of June 2015, he was a resident of Dallas, Texas.
