= Canadian cricket team in the United States in 1844 =

Three-day cricket match in Manhattan

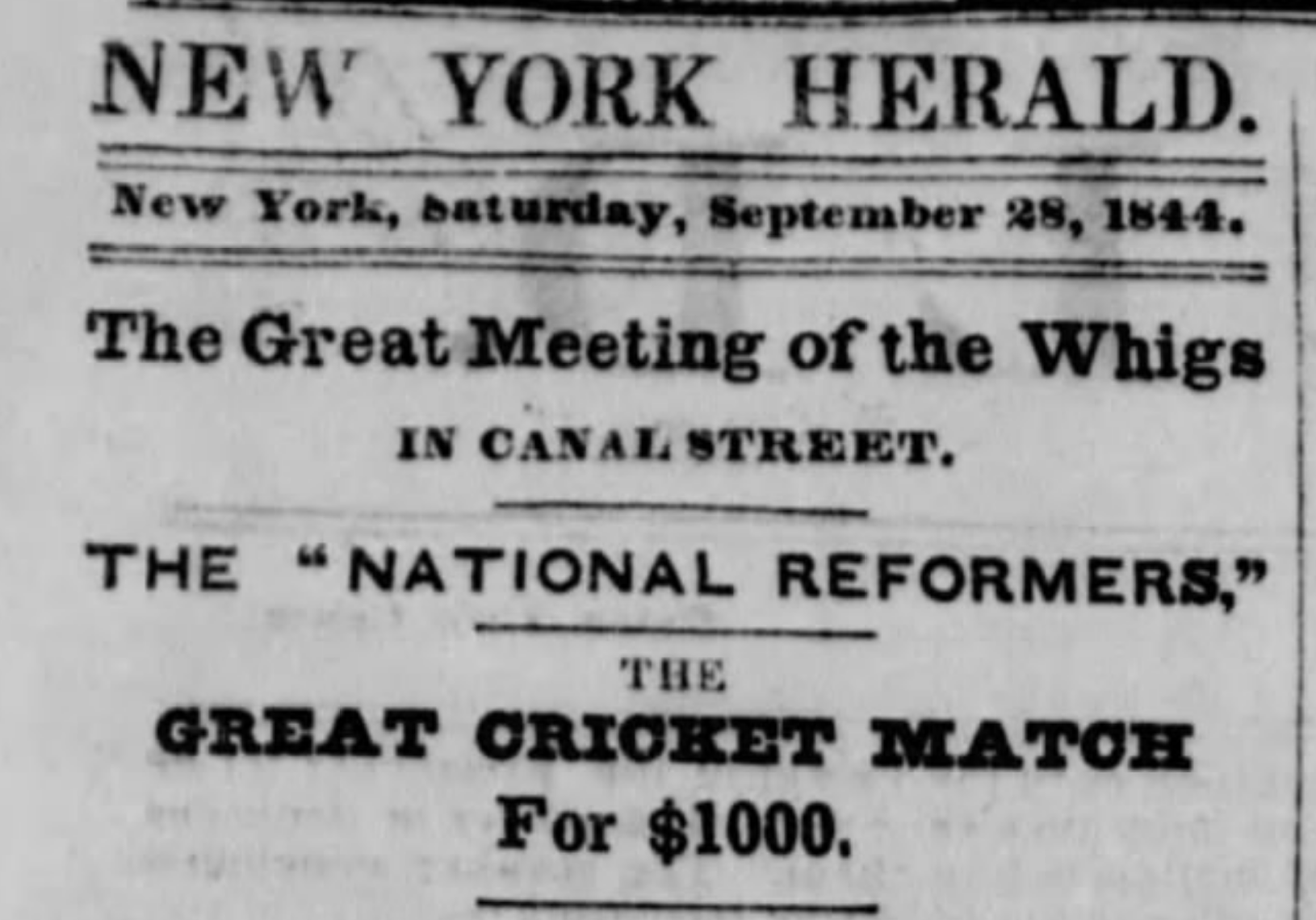
The match was a major news story in the New York press

The Canadian cricket team in the United States in 1844 was a tour consisting of the first international cricket match. The match took place between 24 and 26 September 1844 at the St George's Cricket Club's ground at what is now 30th Street and Broadway (then Bloomingdale Road) in Manhattan, New York. The game was billed as 'United States of America versus the British Empire's Canadian Province’.

Canada won by 23 runs in a low-scoring game. On the first day, there were from 5,000 to 20,000 spectators and an estimated $100,000 to $120,000 worth of bets were placed on the match. The prize money was $1,000 (equivalent to $34,554 in 2025). The United States team played a subsequent match in Canada in 1845; the teams' meetings later became the Auty Cup.

== Background ==
The origins of the match began four years earlier, when a team from the St George's Club turned up in Toronto, almost destitute after a long journey by stage coach through New York State and across Lake Ontario by steamer, where a Mr. Phillpotts had invited St George's to play the Toronto Cricket Club at home.

However, when the 18 men of St George's arrived on 28 August 1840, the Canadians were not expecting them: it was then discovered that the Mr. Phillpotts who had arranged the match was not the Toronto club's Secretary, George A. Phillpotts, but an impostor.

Despite the invitation being a hoax, a cricket match was hastily arranged, which was attended by a good number of spectators, a brass band and Sir George Arthur, the governor of Upper Canada. The New York club won by 10 wickets, and left on such good terms that they invited the Canadians down for what was to be the first cricket match between national teams rather than local club teams.

== Match ==
The US team was drawn from clubs in Philadelphia, Washington, DC and Boston, as well as a number in New York.

Likewise, the Canadians tried to present a representative national team, rather than simply the Toronto CC team. Whether or not the Canadians managed to actually make it a cross-Canada national team is unclear, but letters written between the clubs indicate the Canadian team may have included players from the Guelph Cricket Club and Upper Canada College Club as well as the Toronto club. Advertisements and posters for the game found in libraries have the game as between the US and Canada, rather than two city teams.

The game was scheduled for two days, and after the first day, Canada had been bowled out for 82, with the USA being 61 for 9 in reply.

On the second day, bad weather prevented play, so the game was extended to a third day, when the USA were all out for 64, and Canada were bowled out for 63 in their second innings, setting the USA 82 runs to win. Canada bowled the US out for 58 to win the match by 23 runs.

US player George Wheatcroft arrived too late on the third day, and was replaced in the field by Alfred Marsh, who did not bat.

== Match details ==
24–26 September 1844
Scorecard

Canada	v	United States
82 (32 overs); David Winckworth, George Sharpe, Freeling 12; Samuel Wright 5		64; Robert Tinson 14; David Winckworth, Fred French 4
63; David Winckworth 14; Henry Groom 5		58; James Turner 14; George Sharpe 6

Canada won by 23 runs
St. George's Cricket Club, New York City
Attendance: 20,000
Umpires: J.H. Conolly, H. Russell, R. Waller

- United States of America won the toss and elected to field.
- Rain prevented any play occurring on Day 2. The match was extended into a third day.
- George Wheatcroft (batting for the USA) failed to arrive in time to take part in the match on the third day – Alfred Marsh fielded as the substitute for him.

== Legacy ==
In 1845, a return match was arranged at McGill University, Montreal, and the fixture, known as the Auty Cup, has been played sporadically ever since.

The cricket statistician Bill Frindall wrote in 2002, "The USA has fielded many international teams. Their annual match against Canada has been staged since 1844, pre-dating the earliest encounters between England and Australia by 33 years."

The opening match of the 2024 T20 World Cup was also played between the USA and Canada in the United States.

== See also ==
- 1871 Scotland versus England rugby union match – the first international rugby union match
- England v Scotland representative football matches (1870–1872) – the first in association football
