= Justin Baard =

Namibian cricketer (born 1993)

Personal information
- Full name: Justin Baard
- Born: 18 November 1993 (age 32); Namibia
- Batting: Right-handed
- Bowling: Right-arm offbreak

Career statistics
Competition	FC	LA	T20
Matches	9	6	4
Runs scored	234	25	28
Batting average	13.00	4.16	7
100s/50s	0/1	0/0	0/0
Top score	50	10	27
Catches/stumpings	5/–	3/–	0/–
- Source: CricketArchive

Justin Baard (born 18 November 1993) is a Namibian former cricketer who played for Namibia between 2013–14 and 2017–18.
