= United States cricket team in Canada in 1845 =

The United States cricket team in Canada in 1845 was the second to visit another country following Canada's visit to the US in 1844.

Canada and USA staged the second-ever cricket international at McGill University, Montreal on 30 and 31 July. Canada won the match by 61 runs after the USA had won the toss and decided to field.

Canada scored 80 in their first innings with a top score of 29 by Charles Birch, while Henry Groom captured 5 wickets. The USA replied with 79, George Sharpe taking 6 wickets, but Canada improved in the second innings and made 135, a good score in the contemporary conditions. Sharpe, making an exemplary all-round contribution, scored 31, and Lieutenant Hornby scored 35. Groom took another four wickets. Needing 137 to win, the USA could only manage 75 after David Winckworth took eight wickets.

The two teams met later the same year in New York, with Canada winning again by 2 wickets.

== Match details ==
30–31 July 1845
Scorecard

Canada	v	United States
80; CJ Birch 29; Henry Groom 5 wkts		79; R Ticknor 20; George Sharpe 6 wkts
135; Hornby 35; Henry Groom 4 wkts		75; S Wright 21; David Winckworth 8 wkts

Canada won by 61 runs
McGill University, Montreal
Umpires: William Bradshaw, William Draper, Try

- USA won the toss and decided to field
- Bad weather delayed start of play on the first day
