= 2010 ICC Africa Under-19 Championships =

2010 ICC Under-19 Africa Championships
- Administrator(s): International Cricket Council, African Cricket Association
- Cricket format: Limited overs cricket
- Tournament format: Round-robin
- Champions: Namibia
- Participants: 13

The 2010 ICC Africa Under-19 Championships or 2010 ICC Africa Under-19 World Cup Qualifiers were two cricket events organised by the African Cricket Association. The championships were played over two divisions and provided African U-19 teams with the chance to qualify for the 2012 U-19 World Cup. The second division was held from 26 to 30 July in Big Bend, Swaziland and the first division from 29 August-5 September in Windhoek, Namibia.

== Division two ==
This was only the second playing of Division Two and it followed the same round-robin format as the previous year. The venue and dates were confirmed in May to be at Big Bend, a small village in the Lowveld region of Swaziland, from 26 to 30 July. All matches were played on three fields at and around the Ubombo Country Club. The winners would be promoted to the Division One Tournament.

=== Teams ===
The following five teams took part in the tournament:

Relegated from 2009 Division One:

- Nigeria

Remaining from 2009 Division Two:

- Gambia
- Mozambique
- Rwanda
- Eswatini

Ghana, who took part the year before, were originally included in the line up, but did not end up participating.

=== Matches ===
26 July 2010
scorecard

Gambia; 112 all out (41.3 overs)	v	Nigeria; 115/0 (12.5 overs)
Ismalia Tamba 11 (26); James Chukwu 28/3 (10 overs)		Aderin Olomide 54* (39); Gabriel Njie 16/0 (4 overs)

Nigeria won by 10 wickets
U-Tech School Ground, Big Bend
Umpires: J Bedford (SA) and AW Louw (Nam)

- Nigeria won the toss and elected to field

26 July 2010
scorecard

Mozambique; 53 all out (24 overs)	v	Swaziland; 54/6 (16.3 overs)
Sadraque Mangachaia 14 (17); Timothy Boycott 15/4 (7 overs)		Alex Dladla 9* (11); Saeed Ahmad 23/4 (8.3 overs)

Swaziland won by 4 wickets
Umbombo Country Club, Big Bend
Umpires: LK Bhudia (Ind) and R D'Mello (Ind)

- Mozambique won the toss and elected to bat

27 July 2010
scorecard

Rwanda; 138 all out (50 overs)	v	Nigeria; 140/2 (21 overs)
Evode Muthuyimana 36 (71); Anyia Benjamin 22/3 (10 overs)		Aderin Olomide 66* (70); Eugene Haragirimana 11/1 (2 overs)

Nigeria won by 8 wickets
Ubombo Country Club, Big Bend
Umpires: AW Louw (Nam) and K Serfontein

- Rwanda won the toss and elected to bat

27 July 2010
scorecard

Mozambique; 192/8 (45 overs)	v	Gambia; 194/5 (30.3 overs)
Brighton Muthisse 52 (97); Andre Jarju 35/3 (8.4 overs)		Abdoulie Johnson 47 (48); Belardo Mbede 44/2 (8 overs)

Gambia won by 5 wickets
Sisekelo High School Ground, Big Bend
Umpires: J Bedford (SA) and R D'Mello (Ind)

- Mozambique won the toss and elected to bat
- Match reduced to 45 overs per side

28 July 2010
scorecard

Nigeria; 269/7 (50 overs)	v	Mozambique; 23 all out (17.5 overs)
James Chukwu 102* (80); Atishay Gupta 68/2 (10 overs)		Antonio Maposse 4 (30); Anyia Benjamin 12/5 (8 overs)

Nigeria won by 246 runs
U-Tech School Ground, Big Bend
Umpires: J Bedford (SA) and K Serfontein

- Nigeria won the toss and elected to bat

28 July 2010
scorecard

Swaziland; 92 all out (24.2 overs)	v	Rwanda; 93/5 (21.2 overs)
Henk Nel 13 (12); Joseph Tuyishimire 14/3 (5 overs)		Derrick Bayingana 22* (19); Patel Jilani 31/3 (7 overs)

Rwanda won by 5 wickets
Sisekelo High School Ground, Big Bend

- Swaziland won the toss and elected to bat

29 July 2010
result

Nigeria	v	Swaziland

Nigeria won by 149 runs
Ubombo Country Club, Big Bend

29 July 2010
result

Gambia	v	Rwanda

Rwanda won by 8 wickets
U-Tech School Ground, Big Bend

30 July 2010
scorecard

Swaziland; 197 all out (45.5 overs)	v	Gambia
Mikhail Pheiffer 77 (91); John Elvis 32/3 (6 overs)

Swaziland won by 98 runs
Ubombo Country Club, Big Bend

- Gambia won the toss and elected to field

30 July 2010
scorecard

Rwanda; 170 all out (41.1 overs)	v	Mozambique; 83 all out (28.1 overs)
Evode Muthuyimana 49 (91); Saeed Ahmad 26/5 (10 overs)		Sadraque Mangachaia 22 (40); Desire Sebahire 26/4 (10 overs)

Rwanda won by 87 runs
Sisekelo High School Ground, Big Bend
Umpires: LK Bhudia (Ind) and K Serfontein

- Rwanda won the toss and elected to bat

Note: Full scorecards are not available for all matches

=== Points Table ===
Pos.	Team	P	W	L	T	NR	Pts	NRR	Result
1	Nigeria	4	4	0	0	0	8	+3.201	Promoted to 2010 Division One
2	Rwanda	4	3	1	0	0	6	+1.135	
3	Swaziland	4	2	2	0	0	4	-0.229	
4	Gambia	4	1	3	0	0	2	-1.793	
5	Mozambique	4	0	4	0	0	0	-2.847	

== Division One ==
=== Teams ===
Eight African affiliate nations are participating in this competition and these are:

- Botswana
- Kenya
- Namibia
- Nigeria
- Sierra Leone
- Tanzania
- Uganda
- Zambia

=== Matches ===
Each team will play every other team in a round-robin format. Final placings will be decided by wins and then run rate. Points are allocated: 2-Win, 1-Tie/No Result, 0-Loss.

The top two teams will progress to the U19 CWC Global Qualifiers

Day 1 - Uganda def Nigeria, Namibia def Botswana, Kenya def Zambia, Sierra Leone def Tanzania

Day 2 - Uganda def Tanzania, Namibia def Zambia, Nigeria def Botswana, Kenya def Sierra Leone

Day 3 - Namibia def Sierra Leone, Kenya def Tanzania, Botswana def Uganda, Zambia def Nigeria

Day 4 - Namibia def Tanzania, Uganda def Kenya, Sierra Leone def Nigeria, Botswana def Zambia

Day 5 - Namibia def Kenya, Botswana def Sierra Leone, Zambia def Uganda, Nigeria def Tanzania

Day 6 - Namibia def Uganda, Botswana def Tanzania, Kenya def Nigeria, Zambia def Sierra Leone

Day 7 - Kenya def Botswana, Namibia def Nigeria, Uganda def Sierra Leone, Zambia def Tanzania

=== Live Scores ===
Live scores are available through the WebCricket service provided by Cobitech.

Live scores are available for mobile phones through the WebCricket.mobi site.

=== Points Table ===
Pos.	Team	Points	Games	Wins	Ties	Losses
1	Namibia	14	7	0	0	0
2	Kenya	10	7	5	0	2
3	Botswana	8	7	4	0	3
4	Zambia	8	7	4	0	3
5	Uganda	8	7	4	0	3
6	Sierra Leone	4	7	2	0	5
7	Nigeria	4	7	2	0	5
8	Tanzania	0	7	0	0	7
