= Drummond Cricket Club Ground =

Cricket ground in Northern Ireland

Coordinates: 55°02′27.71″N 6°54′23.75″W

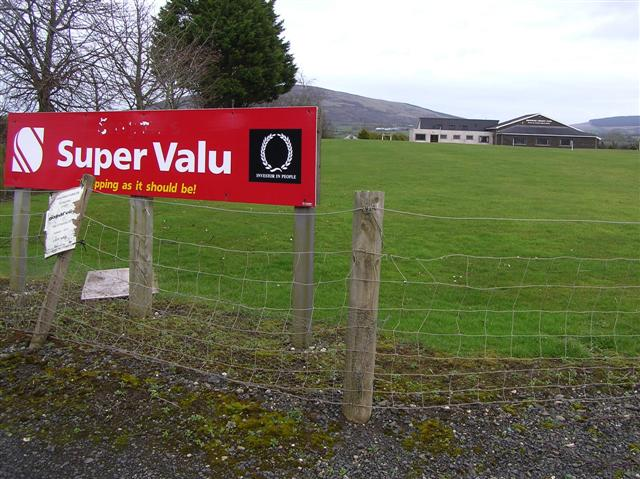
- Location: Limavady, Northern Ireland
- As of 29 August 2011; Source: Ground profile

Drummond Cricket Club Ground is a cricket ground in Limavady, County Londonderry, Northern Ireland. In 2005, the ground hosted a List A match in the 2005 ICC Trophy between Oman and Papua New Guinea, which resulted in a Papua New Guinean victory by 93 runs.

In club cricket, the ground is home to Drummond Cricket Club.
