= Henry Edwards (cricketer) =

English cricketer

Personal information
- Full name: Henry Richard Edwards
- Born: 20 July 1861; Hackney, London, England
- Died: 22 June 1921 (aged 59); Haywards Heath, Sussex, England
- Batting: Unknown
- Bowling: Unknown

Domestic team information
- Years: Team
- 1885: Sussex

Career statistics
Competition	First-class
Matches	1
Runs scored	0
Batting average	0.00
100s/50s	–/–
Top score	0
Balls bowled	–
Wickets	–
Bowling average	–
5 wickets in innings	–
10 wickets in match	–
Best bowling	–
Catches/stumpings	–/–
- Source: Cricinfo, 14 December 2011

Henry Richard Edwards (20 July 1861 – 22 June 1921) was an English cricketer. Edwards' batting and bowling styles are unknown. He was born at Hackney, London. He was registered at birth as Harry Richard Edwards.

Edwards made a single first-class appearance for Sussex against Lancashire at the County Ground, Hove in 1885. He was dismissed for a duck twice in this match. He was dismissed by Johnny Briggs in Sussex's first-innings, while in their second-innings he was dismissed by Dick Barlow. This was his only major appearance for Sussex.

He died at Hackney, London on 22 June 1921.
