= Richard Muzhange =

Zimbabwean cricketer (born 1991)

Personal information
- Born: 30 January 1991
- Batting: Right-handed

Domestic team information
- Years: Team
- Mid West Rhinos
- Source: Cricinfo, 28 March 2014

Richard Muzhange (born 30 January 1991) is a Zimbabwean cricketer, who plays as a right-handed batsman.
