= Peter Ross (cricketer) =

Scottish cricketer (born 1992)

Personal information
- Full name: Peter Arthur Ross
- Born: 2 September 1992 (age 34); Aberdeen, Scotland
- Batting: Right-handed
- Bowling: Right-arm fast-medium
- Role: Batsman

Domestic team information
- Years: Team
- 2014: Leeds/Bradford MCC University

Career statistics
Competition	First-class
Matches	2
Runs scored	17
Batting average	8.50
100s/50s	0/0
Top score	16
Catches/stumpings	2/–
- Source: ESPNcricinfo, 11 April 2020

Peter Ross (born 2 September 1992) is a Scottish cricketer. He is a right-handed batsman and a right-arm fast medium bowler. He made his first class debut for Leeds/Bradford MCC University against Yorkshire on 1 April 2014.

Ross played previously five One day cricket matches for the Scotland national cricket team under-19s team.

In March 2022, Ross was appointed interim head coach of the Scotland women's national cricket team following the resignation of Mark Coles. His appointment was to the end of the 2022 ICC Women's T20 World Cup Qualifier in the United Arab Emirates.
