= Christopher Kent (cricketer) =

Papua New Guinean cricket player

Personal information
- Full name: Christopher Kent
- Born: 25 November 1991 (age 34)
- Batting: Right-handed
- Bowling: Leg break

International information
- National side: Papua New Guinea

Career statistics
Competition	List A
Matches	5
Runs scored	101
Batting average	–
100s/50s	–/1
Top score	59
Balls bowled	6
Wickets	–
Bowling average	–
5 wickets in innings	–
10 wickets in match	–
Best bowling	–
Catches/stumpings	–/–
- Source: Cricinfo, 22 May 2011

Christopher 'Topa' Kent (born 25 November 1991) is a Papua New Guinean cricketer. Kent is a right-handed batsman who bowls leg break. He attended Marist College Ashgrove in Brisbane, Queensland, Australia and played his senior cricket at Norths Cricket Club in Brisbane.

Kent represented his country in the 2011 World Cricket League Division Three, featuring in six matches and helping them earn promotion to the 2011 World Cricket League Division Two. It was in this tournament that he made his List A debut against Bermuda. He played a further 4 List A matches in the competition, the last coming against Hong Kong. In his 5 matches in the competition, he scored 101 runs at a batting average of 20.20, with a single half century score of 59, which came against Hong Kong. He was the leading run-scorer at the 2011 under-19 cricket World Cup qualifier. He finished with 474 runs for the tournament and a high score of 166 not out against Canada. He was also the captain of the PNG u-19 side for the 2011 u-19 cricket world cup qualifiers. Kent was also selected for the PNG men's senior side to compete in the global 20/20 qualifiers in March 2012. He played three matches and scored 42 runs at an average of 42.00.
