= Shiva Vashishat =

Indian-born American cricketer

Personal information
- Born: November 10, 1989 (age 37); Jalandhar, Punjab, India
- Batting: Right-handed
- Bowling: Right-arm leg spin

International information
- National side: United States (2015)

Career statistics
Competition	T20
Matches	2
Runs scored	9
Batting average	4.50
100s/50s	0/0
Top score	6
Catches/stumpings	0/–
- Source: CricketArchive, October 6, 2015

Shiva Vashishat (born November 10, 1989) is an American cricketer who made his debut for the United States national cricket team in July 2015. A right-handed all-rounder bowling leg spin, he earlier captained the U.S. under-19 side at the 2010 Under-19 World Cup.

Born in Jalandhar, Punjab, Vashishat emigrated to the United States with his family at the age of 10, and was raised in San Jose, California, where he attended Del Mar High School. His early cricket was played in the San Francisco Bay Area, though he has since played for teams in several California-based leagues. Vashishat debuted for the U.S. under-19 team in July 2009, at the 2009 Americas Under-19 Championship in Canada, and was captain for that tournament as well as the 2009 World Cup Qualifier and the 2010 World Cup in New Zealand. At the World Cup in New Zealand, where matches had under-19 One Day International (ODI) status, he played in all six games for the U.S. but had little success with either bat or ball. During his time at UC Davis, where he graduated with a degree in economics, Vashishat played little high-level cricket, but in 2015 he was selected in the U.S. squad for the 2015 World Twenty20 Qualifier in Ireland and Scotland. He went on to make his Twenty20 debut in the opening match of the tournament against Nepal.

In November 2019, he married Shana Sandhar. In June 2021, he was selected to take part in the Minor League Cricket tournament in the United States following the players' draft.
