= Trevin Bastiampillai =

Canadian cricket player

Personal information
- Full name: Trevin Callistus Bastiampillai
- Born: 26 October 1985 (age 41); Colombo, Western Province, Sri Lanka
- Batting: Right-handed
- Bowling: Right-arm off break

International information
- National side: Canada (2007–2014)
- ODI debut (cap 45): 3 July 2007 v Netherlands
- Last ODI: 28 January 2014 v Netherlands
- T20I debut (cap 22): 3 February 2010 v Ireland
- Last T20I: 04 February 2010 v Afghanistan

Career statistics
Competition	ODI	T20I	FC	LA
Matches	13	2	10	20
Runs scored	175	–	478	278
Batting average	13.46	–	25.15	14.63
100s/50s	0/0	–	0/5	0/0
Top score	49	–	73	49
Catches/stumpings	1/–	0/–	4/–	4/–
- Source: Cricinfo, 28 January 2014

Trevin Callistus Bastiampillai (born 26 October 1985) is a Canadian cricket player. He is a right-handed batsman, and a right arm off-spin bowler. He has played two matches for Canada in the ICC Americas Championship in 2006, against Argentina and the USA. He also played for Canada's Under 19 team in 2004 World Cup, as did his brother Gavin. At the 2005 edition of the ICC Qualifiers U19, tournament's leading runscorer, Canadian batsman Trevin Bastiampillai, was the only player to record more than 100 runs,
