= K. A. Auty Cup =

International cricket series

K.A. Auty Cup Trophy
- Countries: Canada; United States
- Administrator: Cricket Canada; USA Cricket
- First edition: 1963
- Latest edition: 2017
- Current trophy holder: United States

The K.A. Auty Cup Trophy is an international cricket series played between Canada and the United States, founded in 1963. It is a revival of a series that took place between 1844 and 1912, which was cricket's earliest international series.

The Auty Cup has been played intermittently since 1963. It is hosted alternately by Cricket Canada and USA Cricket, previously the USACA. No matches were held between 1995 and 2011, and the series was last held in 2017.

The Auty Cup trophy is named after the engineer, writer and cricketer Karl Andre Auty, who was born in Dewsbury, England in 1881 and died in Chicago, Illinois in 1959, "who for many years had been a driving force in American cricket, mainly around the Chicago area".

Traditionally held as a single two-day match, the series between 2012 and 2017 included 50-over and Twenty20 matches.

== Background ==
A Canadian cricket team visited Manhattan to play a tour match in 1844; the Anglo American explicitly reports the match as being St George's Cricket Club against "eleven players of all Canada", although it was billed as "United States of America versus the British Empire's Canadian Province". The match was arranged after the St George's team had arrived unexpectedly at the Toronto Cricket Club in 1840 because of a hoax invitation.

After the 1844 match, which the Canadians won by 23 runs, an American team traveled to play a return match in 1845 at McGill University in Montreal. The series was played regularly from 1853 but ended in 1912.

Cricket Canada has incorrectly claimed that the 1844 match was the first international sporting fixture, when many older international events existed in other sports.

== History ==
In 1961, "the President of the USACA, John I. Marder was entertained by the CCA President Lewis J.H. Gunn." This meeting "agreed to revive the International Series and as a result the famous contest reappeared in the summer of 1963." The K.A. Auty trophy was presented by the USACA in 1963 to honour the memory of Karl Andre Auty.

The series ceased after the 1995 match, was revived in 2011, but was not played in 2014 or 2015.

Canada won the 2016 Auty Cup by a 2–1 margin (retaining the Cup), in a series of three 50-over matches held on October 13, 14, and 16, in Los Angeles just before the 2016 ICC World Cricket League Division Four tournament. In 2017 the USA won, in a series of three 50-over matches played on September 12–14 in Toronto. There was no competition in 2018, as the two organizations were not able to finalize terms for the series. The series was scheduled to resume in July 2021, but was cancelled due to the COVID-19 pandemic.
