= Manny Aulakh =

Canadian cricketer (born 1991)

Personal information
- Full name: Maninderjit Singh Aulakh
- Born: 17 November 1991 (age 34); Bathinda, Punjab, India
- Batting: Right-handed
- Bowling: Right-arm fast-medium
- Role: Bowler

International information
- National side: Canada (2012–2013)
- T20I debut (cap 37): 23 March 2012 v Scotland
- Last T20I: 16 March 2013 v Kenya

Career statistics
Competition	T20I	FC	T20
Matches	3	1	8
Runs scored	0	11	4
Batting average	–	11.00	4.00
100s/50s	0/0	0/0	0/0
Top score	0*	11	4
Balls bowled	54	132	138
Wickets	3	3	7
Bowling average	27.33	31.33	22.57
5 wickets in innings	0	0	0
10 wickets in match	3	0	0
Best bowling	2/40	3/94	2/8
Catches/stumpings	1/–	0/–	2/–
- Source: ESPN Crickinfo, 30 April 2020

Manny Aulakh (born 17 November 1991) is a Canadian international cricketer of Punjabi origin from India who plays for the Canada national cricket team. Aulakh is a right-hand batsman and bowls right arm fast-medium.

== Career ==
Aulakh made his first-class cricket debut against the Ireland national cricket team on 13 September 2011. He also played in T20I cricket competitions against the Scotland national cricket team.
