= Arslan Khan (Canadian cricketer) =

Canadian cricketer (born 1999)

Personal information
- Born: 16 April 1999 (age 27)

International information
- National side: Canada
- Source: Cricinfo, 9 November 2019

Arslan Khan (born 16 April 1999) is a Canadian cricketer. In October 2019, he was named in Canada's squad for the 2019–20 Regional Super50 tournament in the West Indies. He made his List A debut on 8 November 2019, for Canada against the Leeward Islands, in the Regional Super50 tournament. Prior to his List A debut, he was named as the captain of Canada's squad for the 2018 Under-19 Cricket World Cup.
