= Shir Shirzai =

Afghan cricketer (born 1993)

Personal information
- Born: 29 June 1993 (age 33)
- Source: Cricinfo, 20 October 2017

Shir Shirzai (born 29 June 1993) is an Afghan cricketer. He made his first-class debut for Amo Region in the 2017–18 Ahmad Shah Abdali 4-day Tournament on 20 October 2017. He made his Twenty20 debut on 12 September 2020, for Amo Sharks in the 2020 Shpageeza Cricket League.
