= 2009 ICC Americas Under-19 Championship =

The 2009 ICC Americas Under-19 Championship was an event organised by the Americas Cricket Association for the top Under-19 teams from its member nations. The tournament also served as qualification for the 2009 ICC Under-19 Cricket World Cup Qualifier to which the top two teams would progress. It was held from 6–12 July in Toronto, Ontario, Canada. Six teams participated with Canada emerging as champions and second placed USA joining them in qualification.

== Teams ==
All the associate members of the ACA took part alongside affiliate side Bahamas.

- Argentina
- Bahamas
- Bermuda
- Canada
- Cayman Islands
- United States

== Matches ==
The teams played one another in a round-robin format with the final placings being decided by wins, followed by net run rate.

== Final Table ==
Team	Played	Won	Lost	Tied	NR	Points	NRR	Result
Canada	5	5	0	0	0	10	3.87	Qualify for 2010 U-19 Cricket World Cup Qualifier
United States	5	4	1	0	0	8	2.59	Qualify for 2010 U-19 Cricket World Cup Qualifier
Bermuda	5	3	2	0	0	6	1.64	
Cayman Islands	5	2	3	0	0	4	-1.77	
Bahamas	5	1	4	0	0	2	-2.22	
Argentina	5	0	5	0	0	0	-3.91	Relegated to 2010 U-19 Americas Division Two
