= Maple Leaf Cricket Club =

Cricket club in Ontario, Canada

Coordinates: 43°57′15.98″N 79°30′30.93″W

Maple Leaf North-West Ground
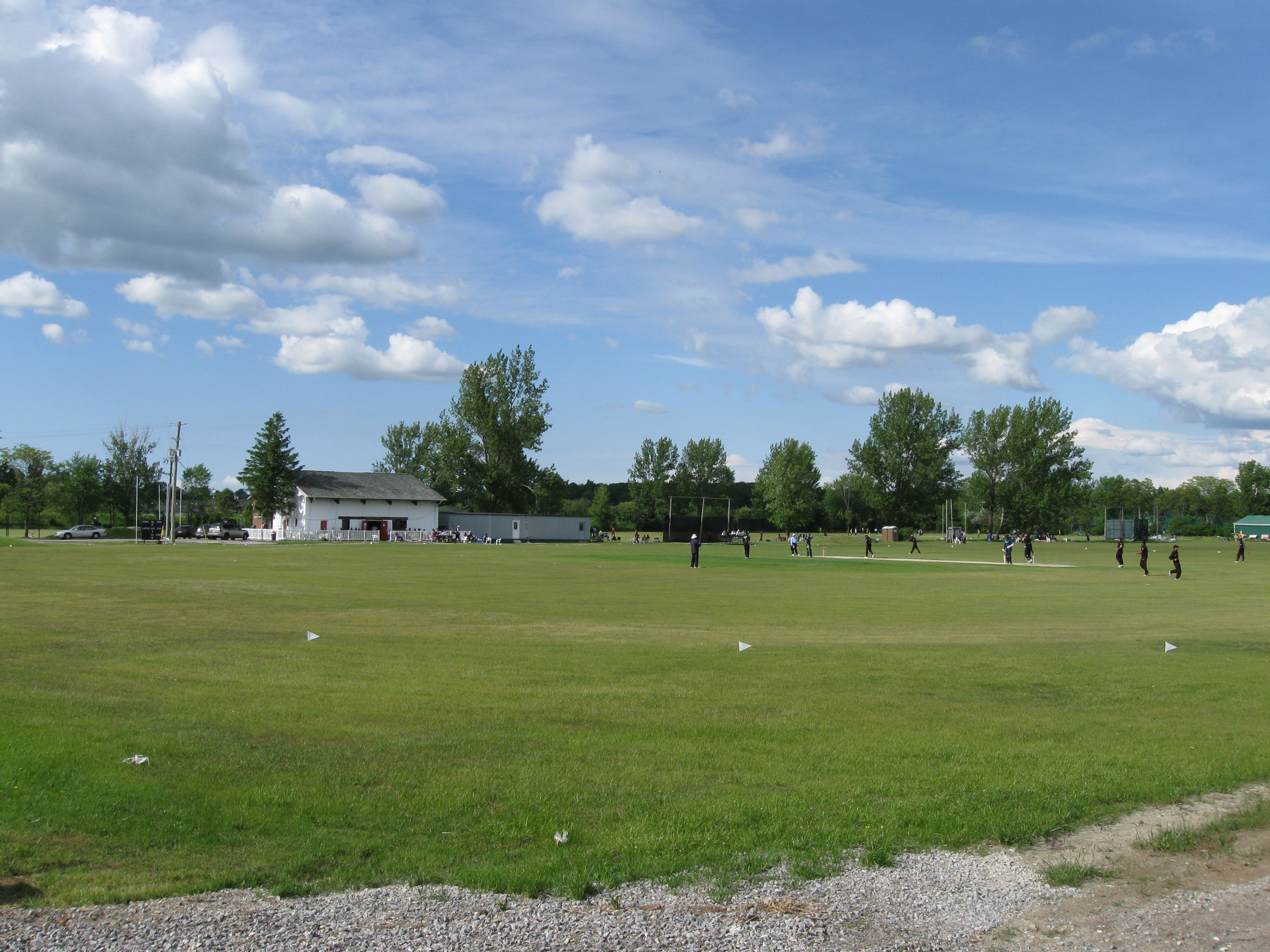
- Interactive map of Maple Leaf North-West Ground

Ground information
- Location: King City, Ontario
- Country: Canada
- Establishment: 1954
- Capacity: 7,000
- End names
- Northern End; Southern End

International information
- First men's ODI: 28 June 2008: Canada v Bermuda
- Last men's ODI: 6 June 2026: Canada v United States
- First men's T20I: 10 October 2008: Sri Lanka v Zimbabwe
- Last men's T20I: 15 June 2025: Bahamas v Cayman Islands
- As of 15 June 2025; Source: Maple Leaf (North-West Ground)

Maple Leaf North-East Ground
- Interactive map of Maple Leaf North-East Ground

Ground information
- Location: King City, Ontario
- Country: Canada
- End names
- Northern End; Southern End

International information
- First men's T20I: 11 June 2025: Bahamas v Cayman Islands
- Last men's T20I: 13 June 2025: Canada v Cayman Islands
- As of 13 June 2025; Source: Maple Leaf (North-East Ground)

The Maple Leaf Cricket Club is a cricket club in King City, Ontario, Canada, about 30 kilometres north of Toronto, Ontario. It was established in 1954 and operates a turf wicket facility. In 2006, it became the second ground in Canada to be approved to host One Day Internationals (ODI) by the International Cricket Council.

The facility has 5 cricket grounds. The North-West ground is the most important, and ODIs and Twenty20 Internationals have been played at this ground since the 2008 season. The Maple Leaf Cricket Club has become the primary cricket venue in Canada, assuming the role from the Toronto Cricket, Skating and Curling Club.

The facility has hosted major events including games in the 2001 ICC Trophy, two first-class matches in the 2006 ICC Intercontinental Cup, several games in the ICC Americas Championship tournaments of 2000 and 2006, and the 2008 Quadrangular Twenty20 Series.

It was the venue for all the matches in the inaugural edition of the Global T20 Canada tournament.

== International record ==
=== One Day International centuries ===
Three ODI centuries have been scored at the venue.

No.	Score	Player	Team	Balls	Opposing team	Innings	Date	Result
1	130	Abdool Samad	Canada	125	Bermuda	1	1 July 2008	Won
2	157*	Xavier Marshall	West Indies	118	Canada	1	22 August 2008	Won
3	110*	Chris Gayle	West Indies	77	Canada	2	24 August 2008	Won

=== One Day International five-wicket hauls ===
Four ODI five-wicket hauls have been taken at this venue.

#	Figures	Player	Country	Innings	Opponent	Date	Result
1	5/32	Sunil Dhaniram	Canada	1	Bermuda	29 June 2008	Lost
2	5/24	Timm van der Gugten	Netherlands	1	Canada	29 August 2013	Won
3	5/31	Dillon Heyliger	Canada	1	Nepal	16 September 2024	Won
4	5/47	Gulshan Kumar Jha	Nepal	1	Oman	18 September 2024	Lost

== See also ==
- Toronto Cricket, Skating and Curling Club Ground
- Cricket Canada
