= Bermuda national under-19 cricket team =

Bermuda Under-19s

Personnel
- Captain: Janeiro Tucker

The Bermuda Under-19 cricket team represents Bermuda in Under-19 international cricket competitions. It has qualified for the ICC Under-19 Cricket World Cup on one occasion, in 2008.

Bermuda took part in the 2009 ICC Americas Under-19 Championship, finishing 3rd and so just missing out on the chance to progress to the World Cup Qualifier. They won three matches losing only to Canada and the United States.

== Under-19 World Cup record ==
Bermuda's U19 World Cup record
Year	Result	Pos	№	Pld	W	L	T	NR
(Australia) 1988	Part of ICC Associates XI							
(South Africa) 1998	Did not enter							
(Sri Lanka) 2000	Part of ICC Americas XI							
(New Zealand) 2002	Did not qualify							
(Bangladesh) 2004	Did not qualify							
(Sri Lanka) 2006	Did not qualify							
(Malaysia) 2008	First round	16th	16	5	1	4	0	0
(New Zealand) 2010	Did not qualify							
(Australia) 2012	Did not qualify							
(United Arab Emirates) 2014	Did not qualify							
(Bangladesh) 2016	Did not qualify							
(New Zealand) 2018	Did not qualify							
(South Africa) 2020	Did not qualify							
(Cricket West Indies) 2022	Did not qualify							
(South Africa) 2024	Did not qualify							
(Zimbabwe) (Namibia) 2026	To be determined							
Total				5	1	4	0	0
