= United States national under-19 cricket team =

United States Under-19s

Personnel
- Captain: Utkarsh Srivastava
- Coach: Vincent Vinay Kumar

The United States national under-19 cricket team represents the United States in international under-19 cricket. The team is coached by Vincent Vinay Kumar and is captained by Utkarsh Srivastava.

The team was coached by Thiru Kumaran, a former Indian Test player, during the 2015 ICC Americas Under-19 Championship. and was coached by former U.S. player Kevin Darlington in 2020.

== Tournament history ==
=== ICC Under-19 World Cup ===
United States' U19 World Cup record
Year	Result	Pos	№	Pld	W	L	T	NR
(Australia) 1988	Did not enter							
(South Africa) 1998	Did not enter							
(Sri Lanka) 2000	Did not enter							
(New Zealand) 2002	Did not qualify							
(Bangladesh) 2004	Did not qualify							
(Sri Lanka) 2006	First round	12th	16	5	1	4	0	0
(Malaysia) 2008	Did not qualify							
(New Zealand) 2010	First round	15th	16	6	1	4	0	1
(Australia) 2012	Did not qualify							
(United Arab Emirates) 2014	Did not qualify							
(Bangladesh) 2016	Did not qualify							
(New Zealand) 2018	Did not qualify							
(South Africa) 2020	Did not qualify							
(Cricket West Indies) 2022	Did not qualify							
(South Africa) 2024	First round	16th	16	4	0	4	0	0
(Zimbabwe) (Namibia) 2010	First round	13th	16	4	1	2	0	1
Total				15	2	12	0	1

== List of captains ==
Two players have captained the United States in under-19 One Day International (ODI) matches.

№	Name	First	Last	M	W	L	T	NR	Win%
1	Hemant Punoo	2006	2006	5	1	4	0	0	20.00
2	Shiva Vashishat	2010	2010	6	1	4	0	1	16.67
3	Rishi Ramesh	2024	2024	4	0	4	0		0.00
Overall				15	2	13	0	0	13.33

== Records ==
All records listed are for under-19 One-Day International (ODI) matches only.

=== Team records ===
Highest totals

- 220/8 (49 overs), v. Namibia, at SSC Ground, Colombo, February 14, 2006
- 217 (48.1 overs), v. Ireland, at Queenstown Events Centre, Queenstown, January 19, 2010
- 215 (45.4 overs), v. West Indies, at NCC Ground, Colombo, February 6, 2006

Lowest totals

- 105 (40.2 overs), v. Ireland, at Mangaung Oval, Bloemfontein, January 19, 2024
- 115 (33.1 overs), v. Zimbabwe, at Nelson Park, Napier, January 25, 2010
- 115 (29.1 overs), v. South Africa, at P. Sara, Colombo, February 7, 2006

=== Individual records ===
Most career runs

- 136 – Hemant Punoo (from 5 matches in 2006, at an average of 27.20)
- 125 – Greg Sewdial (from 6 matches in 2010, at an average of 31.25)
- 109 – Steven Taylor (from 6 matches in 2010, at an average of 21.80)

Highest individual scores

- 70 (90 balls) – Andy Mohammed, v. Australia, Queenstown Events Centre, Queenstown, January 16, 2010
- 65 (52 balls) – Hemant Punoo, v. West Indies, at NCC Ground, Colombo, February 6, 2006
- 64 (76 balls) – Hemant Punoo, v. Namibia, at SSC Ground, Colombo, February 14, 2006

Most career wickets

- 10 – Saqeeb Saleem (from 6 matches in 2010, at an average of 14.50)
- 8 – Dominic Audain (from 5 matches in 2006, at an average of 24.00)
- 8 – Abhimanyu Rajp (from 5 matches in 2006, at an average of 24.87)
- 8 – Arya Garg (from 4 matches in 2024, at an average of 24.12)

Best bowling performances

- 5/61 (10 overs) – Abhimanyu Rajp, v. New Zealand, at P. Sara, Colombo, February 15, 2006
- 4/38 (9 overs) – Saqeeb Saleem, v. Zimbabwe, at Nelson Park, Napier, January 25, 2010
- 3/18 (7 overs) – Hammad Shahid, v. Afghanistan, at Nelson Park, Napier, January 27, 2010
