= 2009 Under-19 Cricket World Cup Qualifier =

2009 ICC Under-19 World Cup Qualifier
- Administrator: ICC
- Cricket format: 50 overs
- Tournament format: Round-robin
- Host: Canada
- Champions: Ireland (1st title)
- Participants: 10
- Most runs: (Ireland) Paul Stirling (423)
- Most wickets: (Afghanistan) Zakiullah (21)

The 2009 ICC Under-19 World Cup Qualifier was an international cricket tournament played in Canada from 1 to 13 September 2009. All matches were held in Toronto. The tournament served as the final state of the qualification process for the 2010 Under-19 World Cup in New Zealand. Ten teams participated in the event, with the top six teams progressing to the World Cup.

== Teams ==
Africa Under-19 Championship

- Uganda (champion)
- Sierra Leone (runner-up)

Americas Under-19 Championship

- Canada (champion)
- United States (runner-up)

ACC Under-19 Elite Cup

- Hong Kong (champion)
- Afghanistan (runner-up)

East Asia-Pacific Under-19 Trophy

- Papua New Guinea (champion)
- Vanuatu (runner-up)

Europe Under-19 Division One

- Ireland (champion)
- Netherlands (runner-up)

== Squads ==
Afghanistan	Canada	Hong Kong	Ireland	Netherlands
Shir Mohammad (c); Afsar Zazai; Aimal Wafa; Asghar Hotak; Ayan Aminzai; Ayoub Ahmadzai; Ayub Khan; Iqbal Maliki; Izatullah Dawlatzai; Javed Ahmadi; Khushal Rasooli; Noor-ul-Haq; Zakiullah; Zard Ali	Rustam Bhatti (c); Manny Aulakh; Darius D'Souza; Ruvindu Gunasekera; Hardik Kotak; Abishek Krishnamoorthy; Nitish Kumar; Usman Limbada; Asif Manjra; Salman Nazar; Hiral Patel; Riyaz Pathan; Arsalan Qadir; Hamza Tariq	James Atkinson (c); Irfan Ahmed; Niaz Ali; Waqas Barkat; Shivang Baid; Ashish Gadhia; Aditya Kanthan; Aizaz Khan; Asif Khan; Nizakat Khan; Zuaid Khan; Gurjant Singh; Vikash Vaswani	Andy Balbirnie (c); Ben Ackland; Adrian D'Arcy; George Dockrell; Shane Getkate; Graeme McCarter; Graham McDonnell; Lee Nelson; Stuart Poynter; Eddie Richardson; James Shannon; Paul Stirling; Stuart Thompson; Craig Young	Tim Gruijters (c); Sebastiaan Braat; Lucas Brouwers; Dennis Coster; Quirijn Gunning; Mels Hartman; Floris Kingma; Oliver Klaus; Gangandeep Singh; Vinoo Tewarie; Philip van der Brandeler; Paul van Meekeren; Ferdi Vink; Tobias Visee
Papua New Guinea	Sierra Leone	Uganda	United States	Vanuatu
John Reva (c); Charles Amini; Mea Ao; Sese Bau; Jonathan Diho; Steven Eno; Raymond Haoda; Jason Kila; Vagi Oala; Rogeauka Roge; Heni Siaka; Lega Tau; Toua Tom; Tony Ura	Abu Kamara (c); Brima Ansumana; Mohamed Bangura; Musa Ganda; Ibrahim Kabia; Ibrahim Kamara; Osman Kamara; Balowa Mansaray; Ibrahim Mansaray; Jacob Mansaray; Edward Marrah; Emmanuel Pessima; Julius Quee; Bami Williams	Ahmed Yakub (c); Daniel Batuwa; Suliman Hamid; Brian Masaba; Deusdedit Muhumuza; Emmanuel Nakaana; Geoffrey Nyero; Andrew Ochan; Abraham Oduch; Moses Okwera; Ahmad Sangau; Henry Ssenyondo; Dennis Tabby	Shiva Vashishat (c); Salman Ahmad; Regis Burton; Ryan Corns; Muhammad Ghous; Naseer Jamali; Abhijit Joshi; Andy Mohammed; Saqib Saleem; Greg Sewdial; Yash Shah; Hammad Shahid; Saami Siddiqui; Henry Wardley	Simpson Obed (c); Lazaro Carlot; Jelany Chilia; Worford Kalworai; Kendy Kenneth; Trevor Langa; Karl Laau; Steven Lynch; Nalin Nipiko; MacDonald Obed; Kenny Tari; Tommy Tastuki; Niko Unavalu

== Round-robin ==
=== Points table ===
The top six teams of the tournament qualified for the 2010 U-19 Cricket World Cup.

Team	P	W	L	NR	T	NRR	Pts
Ireland	9	8	1	0	0	1.648	16
Afghanistan	9	7	2	0	0	1.001	14
Papua New Guinea	9	7	2	0	0	0.459	14
Canada	9	7	2	0	0	0.388	14
United States	9	6	3	0	0	0.34	12
Hong Kong	9	3	6	0	0	-0.251	6
Uganda	9	3	6	0	0	-0.508	6
Netherlands	9	3	6	0	0	-1.125	6
Vanuatu	9	1	8	0	0	-2.183	2
Sierra Leone	9	0	9	0	0		0

=== Fixtures ===
All the matches of the tournament were played in Toronto.

Sierra Leone were unable to participate in this tournament due to visa problems; their matches were scratched and their opponents were awarded two points.

1 September 2009

Canada; 106 (42.1 overs)	v	Uganda; 62 (32 overs)

Canada won by 44 runs

1 September 2009

Hong Kong; 160 (49.4 overs)	v	Papua New Guinea; 161/6 (40.2 overs)
Irfan Ahmed (88); RC Haoda 5/24		TP Ura (65); Aizaz Khan 2/24

Uganda won by 4 wickets.
Maple Leaf South-East Ground
Umpires: CA McElwee and T Magee
Player of the match: TP Ura

1 September 2009

Ireland; 254/5 (50 overs)	v	Netherlands; 179/9 (50 overs)

Ireland won by 75 runs.

1 September 2009

United States; 168 (48.4 overs)	v	Vanuatu; 121 (35.2 overs)

USA won by 47 runs.

1 September 2009

Afghanistan	v	Sierra Leone

Afghanistan won (walkover without a ball bowled)

2 September 2009

Canada; 245/6 (50 overs)	v	Papua New Guinea; 193/9 (50 overs)

Papua New Guinea won by 52 runs

2 September 2009

Netherlands; 113 (45.5 overs)	v	Hong Kong; 81 (32.4 overs)

Netherlands won by 32 runs

2 September 2009

United States	v	Sierra Leone

USA won (walkover without a ball bowled)

2 September 2009

Vanuatu; 213/9 (50 overs)	v	Uganda; 215/6 (47.1 overs)

Uganda won by 4 wickets

3 September 2009

Ireland; 289/7 (50 overs)	v	Afghanistan; 217 (45.1 overs)

Ireland won by 72 runs

4 September 2009

Hong Kong; 195 (49.2 overs)	v	Afghanistan; 197/4 (42.3 overs)

Afghanistan won by 6 wickets

4 September 2009

Canada; 220 (49.3 overs)	v	Netherlands; 143 (44.1 overs)

Canada won by 77 runs

4 September 2009

United States; 217/6 (50 overs)	v	Ireland; 175 (46.3 overs)

USA won by 42 runs

4 September 2009

Papua New Guinea; 234/5 (50 overs)	v	Uganda; 142 (43.3 overs)

Papua New Guinea won by 92 runs

4 September 2009

Sierra Leone	v	Vanuatu

Vanuatu won (walkover without a ball bowled)
Umpires: Unknown

5 September 2009

Vanuatu; 111 (27.2 overs)	v	Afghanistan; 115/2 (21.2 overs)

Afghanistan won by 8 wickets

5 September 2009

Canada; 277/6 (50 overs)	v	Hong Kong; 220/8 (50 overs)

Canada won by 57 runs

5 September 2009

Ireland; 273/6 (50 overs)	v	Papua New Guinea; 200 (43.5 overs)

Ireland won by 73 runs

5 September 2009

Netherlands	v	Sierra Leone

Netherlands won (walkover without a ball bowled)
Umpires: Unknown

5 September 2009

Uganda; 135 (45.3 overs)	v	United States; 192/8 (50 overs)

USA won by 57 runs

7 September 2009

Afghanistan; 241/9 (50 overs)	v	United States; 205 (49.1 overs)

Afghanistan won by 36 runs

7 September 2009

Ireland; 193/8 (50 overs)	v	Canada; 164 (47.3 overs)

Ireland won by 29 runs

7 September 2009

Hong Kong; 189/9 (50 overs)	v	Uganda; 184 (48 overs)

Hong Kong won by 5 runs

7 September 2009

Netherlands; 270/8 (50 overs)	v	Vanuatu; 197 (46.3 overs)

Netherlands won by 73 runs

7 September 2009

Papua New Guinea	v	Sierra Leone

Papua New Guinea won (walkover without a ball bowled)

8 September 2009

Uganda; 182 (49.1 overs)	v	Afghanistan; 183/7 (43 overs)

Afghanistan won by 3 wickets

8 September 2009

Canada	v	Sierra Leone

Canada won (walkover without a ball bowled)

8 September 2009

Ireland; 252/7 (50 overs)	v	Hong Kong; 158 (45.4 overs)

Ireland won by 94 runs

8 September 2009

Netherlands; 171 (45.4 overs)	v	United States; 204 (48.4 overs)

USA won by 33 runs

8 September 2009

Papua New Guinea; 195/5 (41.1 overs)	v	Vanuatu; 193 (43.5 overs)

Papua New Guinea won by 5 wickets

10 September 2009

Afghanistan; 272 (49.5 overs)	v	Netherlands; 89 (21.2 overs)

Afghanistan won by 183 runs

10 September 2009

Canada; 303/8 (50 overs)	v	Vanuatu; 280 (45.4 overs)

Canada won by 23 runs

10 September 2009

Hong Kong	v	Sierra Leone

Hong Kong won (walkover without a ball bowled)

10 September 2009

Ireland; 252/8 (50 overs)	v	Uganda; 185 (47.2 overs)

Ireland won by 67 runs

10 September 2009

Papua New Guinea; 180/9 (49.4 overs)	v	United States; 179 (47.4 overs)

PNG won by one wicket

11 September 2009

Afghanistan; 202/4 (36 overs)	v	Papua New Guinea; 197 (50 overs)

Afghanistan won by 6 wickets

11 September 2009

United States; 234 (49.2 overs)	v	Canada; 235/7 (48.3 overs)

Canada won by 3 wickets

11 September 2009

Hong Kong; 30/2 (8.3 overs)	v	Vanuatu; 28 (9.2 overs)

Hong Kong won by 8 wickets

11 September 2009

Ireland	v	Sierra Leone

Ireland won (walkover without a ball bowled)

11 September 2009

Netherlands; 93 (36.3 overs)	v	Uganda; 94/8 (26.1 overs)

Uganda won by 2 wickets

13 September 2009

Canada; 166/5 (43.4 overs)	v	Afghanistan; 165 (40.4 overs)

Canada won by 5 wickets

13 September 2009

Hong Kong; 210/8 (50 overs)	v	United States; 211/9 (49.5 overs)

United States of America Under-19s won by 1 wicket

13 September 2009

Ireland; 373/5 (50 overs)	v	Vanuatu; 82 (14.1 overs)

Ireland won by 291 runs

13 September 2009

Netherlands; 168 (48.3 overs)	v	Papua New Guinea; 254/7 (50 overs)

PNG won by 86 runs

13 September 2009

Uganda	v	Sierra Leone

Uganda won (walkover without a ball bowled)

== Statistics ==
=== Most runs ===
The top five runscorers are included in this table, ranked by runs scored and then by batting average.

Player	Team	Runs	Inns	Avg	Highest	100s	50s
Paul Stirling	Ireland	423	8	52.87	164	2	1
Ayoub Ahmadzai	Afghanistan	369	8	52.71	105	1	3
Andy Balbirnie	Ireland	294	8	36.75	102	1	1
Irfan Ahmed	Hong Kong	293	8	41.85	90	0	3
Usman Limbada	Canada	288	8	36.00	126	1	0

Source: CricketArchive

=== Most wickets ===
The top five wicket takers are listed in this table, ranked by wickets taken and then by bowling average.

Player	Team	Overs	Wkts	Ave	SR	Econ	BBI
Zakiullah	Afghanistan	72.3	21	11.09	20.71	3.21	6/27
Hiral Patel	Canada	77.0	17	15.58	27.17	3.44	5/20
Saqib Saleem	United States	57.0	17	15.94	20.11	4.75	5/38
Lucas Brouwers	Netherlands	68.0	16	12.06	25.50	2.83	4/13
John Reva	Papua New Guinea	61.4	15	14.46	25.50	2.83	7/34

Source: CricketArchive

== See also ==
- 2010 ICC Under-19 Cricket World Cup
