= Canadian cricket team against Afghanistan in the UAE in 2009–10 =

Canadian cricket team against Afghanistan in UAE in 2010
	Canada	Afghanistan
- Dates: 16 February – 23 February 2010

One Day International series
- Results: 2-match series drawn 1–1
Most runs	Ashish Bagai (143)	Mohammad Shahzad (118)
Most wickets	Khurram Chokan (8)	Samiullah Shenwari (4); Mohammad Nabi (4)

The Canadian cricket team played the Afghan cricket team in 2010 in Sharjah in the United Arab Emirates. Owing to the security situation in Afghanistan, they are unable to play home games in their own country, and so play home series in various locations in the Middle East and Indian subcontinent. The teams played two One Day Internationals and an Intercontinental Cup match.

== Squads ==
Afghanistan	Canada
Nowroz Mangal (Captain); Aftab Alam; Asghar Stanikzai; Dawlat Ahmadzai; Hamid Hassan; Karim Sadiq; Mirwais Ashraf; Mohammad Nabi; Mohammad Shahzad (Wicketkeeper); Noor Ali; Raees Ahmadzai; Samiullah Shenwari; Shafiqullah Shafaq; Shapoor Zadran; Kabir Khan (Coach)	Rizwan Cheema (Captain); Arsalan Qadir; Ashish Bagai (Wicketkeeper); Harvir Baidwan; Geoff Barnett; Umar Bhatti; Ian Billcliff; John Davison; Sunil Dhaniram; Sandeep Jyoti; Shaheed Keshvani; Khurram Chohan; Hiral Patel; Henry Osinde; Saad Bin Zafar; Abdool Samad; Usman Limbada; Pubudu Dassanayake (Coach)

== Intercontinental Cup Match ==
20–23 February
Scorecard

Canada	v	Afghanistan
566 (151.5 overs); S Dhaniram 130 (189); Samiullah Shinwari 4/118 [36]		264 (79.0 overs); Shabir Noori 60 (162); NR Kumar 3/58 [13]
191/4d (40.0 overs); TC Bastiampillai 73 (93); Shapoor Zadran 2/85 [16]		494/4 (106.4 overs); Mohammad Shahzad 215* (258); S Dhaniram 1/30 [11]

Afghanistan won by 6 wickets
Sharjah Cricket Association Stadium, Sharjah, United Arab Emirates
Umpires: Ahsan Raza (Pak) and RA Kettleborough (Eng)
Player of the match: Mohammad Shahzad (Afg)

== ODI series ==
=== 1st ODI ===
16 February 2010
Scorecard

Afghanistan; 289/6 (50 overs)	v	Canada; 288/7 (50 overs)
Mohammad Shahzad 118 (121); Khurram Chokan 4/39 [10]		A Bagai 91* (99); Samiullah Shenwari 4/31 [10]

Afghanistan won by 1 run
Sharjah Cricket Association Stadium, Sharjah, UAE
Umpires: Ahsan Raza (Pak) and Aleem Dar (Pak)
Player of the match: Mohammad Shahzad (Afg)

=== 2nd ODI ===
18 February
Scorecard

Afghanistan; 177 (43.1 overs)	v	Canada; 178/6 (39.2 overs)
Mohammad Nabi 62 (57); Khurram Chohan 4/43 [10]		A Bagai 52 (59); Mohammad Nabi 2/23 [8]

Canada won by 4 wickets
Sharjah Cricket Association Stadium, Sharjah, UAE
Umpires: Ahsan Raza (Pak) and Aleem Dar (Pak)
Player of the match: Khurram Chohan (Can)
