= Hong Kong national under-19 cricket team =

Hong Kong Under-19s
- Nickname(s): Hong Kong Youth (HKY)
- One Day name: Hong Kong

The Hong Kong national under-19 cricket team represents the Special Administrative Region of China in international under-19 cricket. It has qualified for the Under-19 Cricket World Cup on one occasion, in 2010.

== History ==
Hong Kong was originally part of the ICC East Asia-Pacific region, and finished runner-up to Papua New Guinea u19 for the 2001 EAP Under-19 Cricket Trophy.

At the 2009 Under-19 Cricket World Cup Qualifier in Canada, the team placed sixth overall to become the last team to qualify for the 2010 Under-19 Cricket World Cup in New Zealand. They won only three out of their nine games at the tournament, finishing above Uganda u19 and Netherlands u19 on net run rate. Irfan Ahmed was the team's leading run-scorer at the qualifier.

Jamie Atkinson was named as the squad's captain for the 2010 World Cup. The team failed to win a game in the first round, losing to England u19, India u19 and Afghanistan u19 (also in its first World Cup). The team was bowled out on each occasion but did not disgrace itself. Later, in the plate stage, Hong Kong lost to Bangladesh u19 but then got revenge over Afghanistan, defeating them by four wickets. In the final game, the 13th place play-off, Hong Kong lost heavily to Zimbabwe u19, being bowled out for 98 to record its lowest score of the tournament.

For the 2019 ACC Under-19 Eastern Region tournament, former national team player Jawaid Iqbal was appointed as the coach. As of 2020, a national under-19 50-over cup was used to select the national team squad.

== Under-19 World Cup record ==
Hong Kong's U19 World Cup record
Year	Result	Pos	№	Pld	W	L	T	NR
(Australia) 1988	Did not enter							
(South Africa) 1998	Did not qualify							
(Sri Lanka) 2000	Did not qualify							
(New Zealand) 2002	Did not qualify							
(Bangladesh) 2004	Did not qualify							
(Sri Lanka) 2006	Did not qualify							
(Malaysia) 2008	Did not qualify							
(New Zealand) 2010	First round	14th	14	5	1	4	0	0
(Australia) 2012	Did not qualify							
(United Arab Emirates) 2014	Did not qualify							
(Bangladesh) 2016	Did not qualify							
(New Zealand) 2018	Did not qualify							
(South Africa) 2020	Did not qualify							
(Cricket West Indies) 2022	Did not qualify							
Total				5	1	4	0	0
