= 2010 Under-19 Cricket World Cup =

Cricket tournament in New Zealand

2010 ICC Under-19 Cricket World Cup
- Dates: 15 January – 30 January 2010
- Administrator: International Cricket Council
- Cricket format: Limited-overs (50 overs)
- Tournament format(s): Round-robin and Knockout
- Host: New Zealand
- Champions: Australia (3rd title)
- Runners-up: Pakistan
- Participants: 16
- Matches: 48
- Player of the series: (South Africa) Dominic Hendricks
- Most runs: (South Africa) Dominic Hendricks (391)
- Most wickets: (Papua New Guinea) Raymond Haoda (15)
- Official website: Official Site

The 2010 ICC Under-19 Cricket World Cup was the eighth edition of the Under-19 Cricket World Cup and took place in New Zealand. Since 1998, the tournament has been held every 2 years. This edition had 16 teams competing in 44 matches between 15 and 30 January 2010. These included the 10 ICC Full Members and 6 Qualifiers. The tournament was originally scheduled to take place in Kenya, but the International Cricket Council (ICC) moved it to New Zealand after an inspection in June 2009 found that it would be unrealistic to expect Kenya to complete preparations in time.

Australia met Pakistan in the final. Australia had only lost one match throughout the tournament, while Pakistan had remained undefeated on their way to the final. Pakistan lost the final to Australia by 25 runs. South African Dominic Hendricks scored the most runs in the tournament, and Raymond Haoda of Papua New Guinea claimed the most wickets.

== Venues ==
The following venues were used for the tournament:

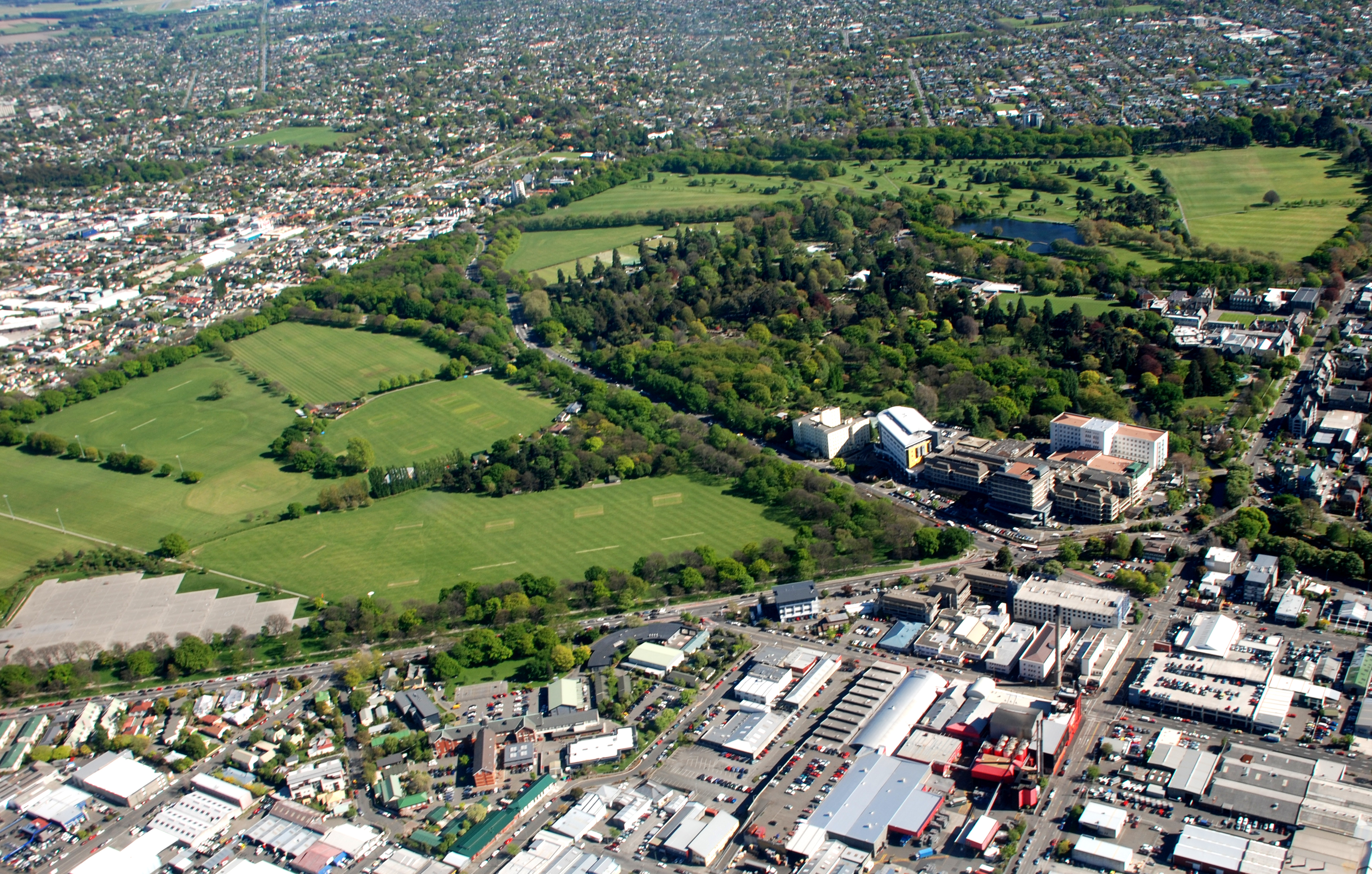
Hagley Park, Christchurch

City	Stadium
Christchurch	Bert Sutcliffe Oval
Christchurch	Lincoln Oval
Christchurch	Queen Elizabeth II Park (Village Green)
Christchurch	Hagley Park
Christchurch	MainPower Oval, (Rangiora)
Napier	Nelson Park
Napier	McLean Park
Palmerston North	Fitzherbert Park
Queenstown	Queenstown Events Centre

== Teams ==
16 teams participated in the competition. The 10 nations with ICC Full Membership automatically qualified for the tournament. 6 additional teams were determined by the 2009 Under-19 Cricket World Cup Qualifier.

Team	Mode of Qualification
Australia	ICC Full Member
Bangladesh	ICC Full Member
England	ICC Full Member
India	ICC Full Member
New Zealand	ICC Full Member
Pakistan	ICC Full Member
South Africa	ICC Full Member
Sri Lanka	ICC Full Member
West Indies	ICC Full Member
Zimbabwe	ICC Full Member
Ireland	1st place in 2009 U-19 World Cup qualifiers
Afghanistan	2nd place in 2009 U-19 World Cup qualifiers
Papua New Guinea	3rd place in 2009 U-19 World Cup qualifiers
Canada	4th place in 2009 U-19 World Cup qualifiers
United States	5th place in 2009 U-19 World Cup qualifiers
Hong Kong	6th place in 2009 U-19 World Cup qualifiers

== Groups ==
The following groups were chosen for the World Cup 2010 by the International Cricket Council. The number alongside gives the rank of the team. The tournament will begin with a league stage consisting of four groups of four. Each team will play each of the other teams in its group once.

Group A	Group B	Group C	Group D
India (1); England (5); Afghanistan (12); Hong Kong (16)	South Africa (2); Australia (6); Ireland (11); United States (15)	New Zealand (3); Sri Lanka (7); Zimbabwe (10); Canada (14)	Pakistan (4); Bangladesh (8); West Indies (9); Papua New Guinea (13)

== Squads ==
Each country selected a 15-man squad for the tournament.

== Group stage ==
- All matches started at 10.30 (NZ Local)
- New Zealand local Time is GMT+13
- The top 2 teams from each group qualified for the knock-out rounds of the tournament.
- The bottom 2 teams from each group took part in a Plate competition knock-out.

=== Group A ===
Pos	Team	Pld	W	L	T	NR	Pts	NRR
1	England	3	3	0	0	0	6	1.767
2	India	3	2	1	0	0	4	1.089
3	Afghanistan	3	1	2	0	0	2	−0.877
4	Hong Kong	3	0	3	0	0	0	−2.095

15 January 2010
Scorecard

Afghanistan; 118 (49.2 overs)	v	India; 122/2 (25.2 overs)
Noor-ul-Haq 61 (119); Jaydev Unadkat 2/17 (6.2 overs)		Mandeep Singh 51* (63); Aftab Alam 1/24 (7 overs)

India won by 8 wickets
Bert Sutcliffe Oval, Lincoln
Umpires: Brian Jerling (SA) and Nadir Shah (Ban)
Player of the match: Mandeep Singh (Ind)

- India won the toss and elected to field.
- Points: India 2, Afghanistan 0

16 January 2010
Scorecard

Hong Kong; 185 (48.5 overs)	v	England; 186/1 (30.1 overs)
Nizakat Khan 65 (69); David Payne 3/24 (9 overs)		James Vince 76* (61); Niaz Ali 1/40 (6 overs)

England won by 9 wickets
Bert Sutcliffe Oval, Lincoln
Umpires: Bruce Oxenford (Aus) and Sarika Prasad (Sin)
Player of the match: James Vince (Eng)

- England won the toss and elected to field.
- Points: England 2, Hong Kong 0

17 January 2010
Scorecard

Hong Kong; 143 (33.5 overs)	v	India; 147/1 (24 overs)
Jamie Atkinson 39 (54); Sandeep Sharma 3/11 (7 overs)		Mayank Agarwal 63 (56); Irfan Ahmed 1/30 (6 overs)

India won by 9 wickets
Hagley Oval, Christchurch
Umpires: Bruce Oxenford (Aus) and Buddhi Pradhan (Nep)
Player of the match: Sandeep Sharma (Ind)

- India won the toss and elected to field.
- Points: India 2, Hong Kong 0

18 January 2010
Scorecard

Afghanistan; 126 (47.2 overs)	v	England; 127/1 (25.5 overs)
Hashmatullah Shaidi 41 (58); Danny Briggs 3/15 (10 overs)		Chris Dent 53* (68); Ayub Khan 1/30 (5 overs)

England won by 9 wickets
Village Green, Christchurch
Umpires: Brian Jerling (SA) and Nadir Shah (Ban)
Player of the match: Danny Briggs (Eng)

- England won the toss and elected to field.
- Points: England 2, Afghanistan 0

19 January 2010
Scorecard

Hong Kong; 137 (35.1 overs)	v	Afghanistan; 141/2 (31 overs)
Ashish Gadhia 46 (70); Zakiullah Zaki 5/34 (7.1 overs)		Javed Ahmadi 90* (98); Ashish Gadhia 2/26 (2 overs)

Afghanistan won by 8 wickets
Hagley Oval, Christchurch
Umpires: Sarika Prasad (Sin) and Shahul Hameed (Idn)
Player of the match: Zakiullah Zaki (Afg)

- Afghanistan won the toss and elected to field.
- Points: Afghanistan 2, Hong Kong 0

21 January 2010
Scorecard

England; 246/8 (50 overs)	v	India; 215 (46.4 overs)
Ben Stokes 100 (88); Saurabh Netravalkar 3/25 (10 overs)		Sufiyan Shaikh 45 (72); David Payne 3/40 (8 overs)

England won by 31 runs
Bert Sutcliffe Oval, Lincoln
Umpires: Brian Jerling (SA) and Norman Malcolm (WI)
Player of the match: Ben Stokes (Eng)

- India won the toss and elected to field.
- Points: England 2, India 0

=== Group B ===
Pos	Team	Pld	W	L	T	NR	Pts	NRR
1	South Africa	3	3	0	0	0	6	0.801
2	Australia	3	2	1	0	0	4	2.093
3	Ireland	3	1	2	0	0	2	−1.480
4	United States	3	0	3	0	0	0	−1.448

15 January 2010
Scorecard

Ireland; 216/6 (50 overs)	v	South Africa; 220/5 (43.4 overs)
Ben Ackland 66 (107); Kirk Wernars 2/42 (8 overs)		Stephan Smith 67* (99); Stuart Thompson 2/29 (7 overs)

South Africa won by 5 wickets
Queenstown Events Centre, Queenstown
Umpires: Paul Baldwin (Ger) and Kumar Dharmasena (SL)
Player of the match: Stephan Smith (SA)

- South Africa won the toss and elected to field.
- Points: South Africa 2, Ireland 0

16 January 2010
Scorecard

Australia; 262 (49.3 overs)	v	United States; 154 (41.2 overs)
Tom Beaton 73 (76); Saqib Saleem 2/25 (7 overs)		Andy Mohammed 70 (90); Alister McDermott 4/29 (10 overs)

Australia won by 108 runs
Queenstown Events Centre, Queenstown
Umpires: Gary Baxter (NZ) and Owen Chirombe (Zim)
Player of the match: Tom Beaton (Aus)

- Australia won the toss and elected to bat.
- Points: Australia 2, United States 0

17 January 2010
Scorecard

Australia; 274/4 (50 overs)	v	Ireland; 65 (24.2 overs)
Alex Keath 88 (111); George Dockrell 2/38 (9 overs)		Stuart Thompson 19 (40); Nick Buchanan 4/16 (6 overs)

Australia won by 209 runs
Queenstown Events Centre, Queenstown
Umpires: Paul Baldwin (Ger) and Gary Baxter (NZ)
Player of the match: Alex Keath (Aus)

- Australia won the toss and elected to bat.
- Points: Australia 2, Ireland 0

18 January 2010
Scorecard

United States; 163 (49.5 overs)	v	South Africa; 166/2 (35.1 overs)
Greg Sewdial 41 (62); Dale Deeb 3/23 (10 overs)		Dominic Hendricks 75* (103); Naseer Jamali 1/28 (7 overs)

South Africa won by 8 wickets
Queenstown Events Centre, Queenstown
Umpires: Owen Chirombe (Zim) and Kumar Dharmasena (SL)
Player of the match: Dominic Hendricks (SA)

- South Africa won the toss and elected to field.
- Points: South Africa 2, United States 0

19 January 2010
Scorecard

United States; 217 (48.1 overs)	v	Ireland; 218/5 (43.5 overs)
Saqib Saleem 62 (77); Lee Nelston 3/3 (1.1 overs)		Paul Stirling 114 (102); Ryan Corns 3/46 (8 overs)

Ireland won by 5 wickets
Queenstown Events Centre, Queenstown
Umpires: Owen Chirombe (Zim) and Kumar Dharmasena (SL)
Player of the match: Paul Stirling (Ire)

- United States of America won the toss and elected to field.
- Points: Ireland 2, United States 0

20 January 2010
Scorecard

Australia; 276/7 (50 overs)	v	South Africa; 278/8 (49.4 overs)
Jason Floros 96 (97); Graham Hume 3/35 (10 overs)		Dominic Hendricks 94 (99); Alex Keath 3/34 (7 overs)

South Africa won by 2 wickets
Queenstown Events Centre, Queenstown
Umpires: Paul Baldwin (Ger) and Gary Baxter (NZ)
Player of the match: Dominic Hendricks (SA)

- Australia won the toss and elected to bat.
- Points: South Africa 2, Australia 0

=== Group C ===
Pos	Team	Pld	W	L	T	NR	Pts	NRR
1	New Zealand	3	3	0	0	0	6	2.242
2	Sri Lanka	3	2	1	0	0	4	1.165
3	Canada	3	1	2	0	0	2	−1.870
4	Zimbabwe	3	0	3	0	0	0	−1.302

15 January 2010
Scorecard

Canada; 201/7 (50 overs)	v	Zimbabwe; 191 (49.4 overs)
Usman Limbada 90 (114); Nathan Waller 2/29 (10 overs)		Dean Mazhawidza 75 (119); Zain Mahmood 3/31 (9.4 overs)

Canada won by 10 runs
Queen Elizabeth II Park, Christchurch
Umpires: Norman Malcolm (WI) and Nadeem Ghauri (Pak)
Player of the match: Usman Limbada (Can)

- Canada won the toss and elected to bat.
- Points: Canada 2, Zimbabwe 0

16 January 2010
Scorecard

Canada; 128 (29.3 overs)	v	New Zealand; 130/1 (19.1 overs)
Arsalan Qadir 26 (30); Logan van Beek 3/27 (7 overs)		James Neesham 47 (20); Arsalan Qadir 1/42 (5 overs)

New Zealand won by 9 wickets
Lincoln Oval, Christchurch
Umpires: Buddhi Pradhan (Nep) and Shahul Hameed (Idn)
Player of the match: Doug Bracewell (NZ)

- New Zealand won the toss and elected to field.
- Points: New Zealand 2, Canada 0

17 January 2010
Scorecard

Zimbabwe; 121 (33.3 overs)	v	Sri Lanka; 122/2 (24.2 overs)
Tinotenda Mutombodzi 42* (68); Charith Jayampathi 4/26 (7 overs)		Bhanuka Rajapaksa 49* (43); Nathan Waller 2/26 (7 overs)

Sri Lanka won by 8 wickets
Bert Sutcliffe Oval, Lincoln
Umpires: Nadeem Ghauri (Pak) and Sarika Prasad (Sin)
Player of the match: Bhanuka Rajapaksa (SL)

- Sri Lanka won the toss and elected to field.
- Points: Sri Lanka 2, Zimbabwe 0

18 January 2010
Scorecard

Sri Lanka; 276/6 (50 overs)	v	Canada; 142 (39.3 overs)
Bhanuka Rajapaksa 68 (85); Hiral Patel 3/45 (10 overs)		Hiral Patel 69 (110); Chathura Peiris 5/25 (8.3 overs)

Sri Lanka won by 134 runs
Lincoln Oval, Christchurch
Umpires: Norman Malcolm (WI) and Shahul Hameed (Idn)
Player of the match: Chathura Peiris (SL)

- Canada won the toss and elected to field.
- Points: Sri Lanka 2, Canada 0

19 January 2010
Scorecard

Zimbabwe; 135 (42.2 overs)	v	New Zealand; 140/3 (25.3 overs)
Tinotenda Mutombodzi 28 (51); Tim Johnston 3/37 (10 overs)		Harry Boam 58 (61); Calum Price 2/32 (5.3 overs)

New Zealand won by 7 wickets
Bert Sutcliffe Oval, Lincoln
Umpires: Bruce Oxenford (Aus) and Buddhi Pradhan (Nep)
Player of the match: Tom Latham (NZ)

- New Zealand won the toss and elected to field.
- Points: New Zealand 2, Zimbabwe 0

20 January 2010
Scorecard

Sri Lanka; 195 (49.1 overs)	v	New Zealand; 196/3 (43.2 overs)
Dhanushka Gunathilleke 69 (71); Tim Johnston 3/32 (10 overs)		Harry Boam 85* (151); Kasun Madushanka 1/16 (3 overs)

New Zealand won by 7 wickets
Village Green, Christchurch
Umpires: Nadeem Ghauri (Pak) and Nadir Shah (Ban)
Player of the match: Harry Boam (NZ)

- New Zealand won the toss and elected to field.
- Points: New Zealand 2, Sri Lanka 0

=== Group D ===
Pos	Team	Pld	W	L	T	NR	Pts	NRR
1	Pakistan	3	3	0	0	0	6	1.452
2	West Indies	3	2	1	0	0	4	0.235
3	Bangladesh	3	1	2	0	0	2	0.685
4	Papua New Guinea	3	0	3	0	0	0	−2.643

15 January 2010
Scorecard

Pakistan; 297/7 (50 overs)	v	West Indies; 257 (46.5 overs)
Babar Azam 129 (132); Jomel Warrican 3/63 (10 overs)		Kraigg Brathwaite 92* (125); Ahmed Shehzad 3/43 (7 overs)

Pakistan won by 40 runs
Fitzherbert Park, Palmerston North
Umpires: Niels Bagh (Den) and Richard Kettleborough (Eng)
Player of the match: Babar Azam (Pak)

- West Indies won the toss and elected to field.
- Points: Pakistan 2, West Indies 0

16 January 2010
Scorecard

Papua New Guinea; 191/9 (46 overs)	v	Bangladesh; 190/5 (27.2 overs)
Tony Ura 70 (91); Abul Hasan 4/22 (9 overs)		Sabbir Rahman 51 (45); Timothy Mou 2/30 (3.2 overs)

Bangladesh won by 5 wickets (D/L method)
Fitzherbert Park, Palmerston North
Umpires: Ian Ramage (Sco) and Shavir Tarapore (Ind)
Player of the match: Sabbir Rahman (Ban)

- Papua New Guinea won the toss and elected to bat.
- Bangladesh were set a revised target of 189 runs from 46 overs due to rain.
- Points: Bangladesh 2, Papua New Guinea 0

17 January 2010
Scorecard

West Indies; 249/8 (50 overs)	v	Bangladesh; 248 (49.4 overs)
Andre Creary 55 (83); Shaker Ahmed 2/39 (10 overs)		Tasamul Haque 54 (57); Akeem Dewar 3/63 (10 overs)

West Indies won by 1 run
Fitzherbert Park, Palmerston North
Umpires: Richard Kettleborough (Eng) and Shavir Tarapore (Ind)
Player of the match: Yannic Cariah (WI)

- West Indies won the toss and elected to bat.
- Points: West Indies 2, Bangladesh 0

18 January 2010
Scorecard

Papua New Guinea; 99 (37.3 overs)	v	Pakistan; 100/4 (18.1 overs)
Tony Ura 23 (45); Usman Qadir 4/35 (10 overs)		Babar Azam 40* (52); Raymond Haoda 2/44 (7.1 overs)

Pakistan won by 6 wickets
Fitzherbert Park, Palmerston North
Umpires: Niels Bagh (Den) and Ian Ramage (Sco)
Player of the match: Usman Qadir (Pak)

- Papua New Guinea won the toss and elected to bat.
- Points: Pakistan 2, Papua New Guinea 0

19 January 2010
Scorecard

Papua New Guinea; 187 (50 overs)	v	West Indies; 188/5 (35.4 overs)
Sese Bau 50 (55); Yannic Cariah 4/37 (10 overs)		Shane Dowrich 84* (85); Raymond Haoda 3/37 (10 overs)

West Indies won by 5 wickets
Fitzherbert Park, Palmerston North
Umpires: Niels Bagh (Den) and Shavir Tarapore (Ind)
Player of the match: Shane Dowrich (WI)

- West Indies won the toss and elected to field.
- Points: West Indies 2, Papua New Guinea 0

20 January 2010
Scorecard

Bangladesh; 250/5 (50 overs)	v	Pakistan; 251/6 (49.5 overs)
Mahmudul Hasan 63 (64); Usman Qadir 2/44 (10 overs)		Babar Azam 91 (110); Mahmudul Hasan 2/36 (10 overs)

Pakistan won by 4 wickets
Fitzherbert Park, Palmerston North
Umpires: Richard Kettleborough (Eng) and Ian Ramage (Sco)
Player of the match: Babar Azam (Pak)

- Bangladesh won the toss and elected to bat.
- Points: Pakistan 2, Bangladesh 0

== Knock-out stage ==
Super Quarter-finals
23 January – (New Zealand) Mainpower Oval
West Indies	166
England	148
23 January – (New Zealand) Bert Sutcliffe Oval
India	114/9
Pakistan	117/8
24 January – (New Zealand) Bert Sutcliffe Oval
Sri Lanka	293/8
South Africa	145
24 January – (New Zealand) Mainpower Oval
Australia	232/8
New Zealand	170

Super Semi-finals
25 January – (New Zealand) Bert Sutcliffe Oval
West Indies	212/8
Pakistan	213/6
27 January – (New Zealand) Bert Sutcliffe Oval
Sri Lanka	205
Australia	206/8

Super Final
30 January – (New Zealand) Bert Sutcliffe Oval
Pakistan	182
Australia	207/9
3rd Place playoff
29 January – (New Zealand) Village Green
West Indies	294/6
Sri Lanka	291/6

Quarter-finals

5th Place playoff semifinals
25 January – (New Zealand) Hagley Oval
England	176
India	179/3
25 January – (New Zealand) Lincoln Oval
New Zealand	250
South Africa	252/1

5th Place playoff
27 January – (New Zealand) Lincoln Oval
India	235/9
South Africa	237/4
7th Place playoff
26 January – (New Zealand) Village Green
England	228/9
New Zealand	229/8

Plate Quarter-finals
23 January – (New Zealand) McLean Park
United States	13/3
Canada
23 January – (New Zealand) Nelson Park
Zimbabwe	102
Ireland	110/3
24 January – (New Zealand) Nelson Park
Papua New Guinea	173/9
Afghanistan	143
24 January – (New Zealand) McLean Park
Hong Kong	156
Bangladesh	157/6

Plate Semi-finals
25 January – (New Zealand) Fitzherbert Park
Canada
Ireland
26 January – (New Zealand) Fitzherbert Park
Bangladesh	253
Papua New Guinea	85

Plate Final
28 January – (New Zealand) McLean Park
Bangladesh	307/8
Ireland	112
11th Place playoff
28 January – (New Zealand) Nelson Park
Papua New Guinea	145
Canada	146/8

Quarter-finals

13th Place playoff semifinals
25 January – (New Zealand) Nelson Park
United States	115
Zimbabwe	119/5
25 January – (New Zealand) McLean Park
Afghanistan	151
Hong Kong	153/6

13th Place playoff
27 January – (New Zealand) McLean Park
Zimbabwe	235/8
Hong Kong	98
15th Place playoff
27 January – (New Zealand) Nelson Park
Afghanistan	86
United States	87/1

=== Quarter-finals ===
==== Super quarter-finals ====
23 January 2010
Scorecard

West Indies; 166 (34.4 overs)	v	England; 148 (33.1 overs)
Kraigg Brathwaite 69 (96); David Payne 4/19 (6 overs)		Ben Stokes 24 (33); Jason Holder 5/19 (6.1 overs)

West Indies won by 18 runs
Mainpower Oval, Rangiora
Umpires: Paul Baldwin (Ger) and Gary Baxter (NZ)
Player of the match: Jason Holder (WI)

- England won the toss and elected to field.

23 January 2010
Scorecard

India; 114/9 (23 overs)	v	Pakistan; 117/8 (22.3 overs)
Mandeep Singh 40 (44); Fayyaz Butt 4/27 (4 overs)		Ahsan Ali 30 (45); Sandeep Sharma 2/24 (4.3 overs)

Pakistan won by 2 wickets
Bert Sutcliffe Oval, Lincoln
Umpires: Kumar Dharmasena (SL) and Bruce Oxenford (Aus)
Player of the match: Fayyaz Butt (Pak)

- Pakistan won the toss and elected to field.
- The match was reduced to 23 overs per side due to rain.

24 January 2010
Scorecard

Australia; 232/8 (50 overs)	v	New Zealand; 170 (43.2 overs)
Mitchell Marsh 53 (59); Logan van Beek 1/26 (6 overs)		Craig Cachopa 34 (53); Josh Hazlewood 2/24 (9 overs)

Australia won by 62 runs
Mainpower Oval, Rangiora
Umpires: Brian Jerling (SA) and Norman Malcolm (WI)
Player of the match: Mitchell Marsh (Aus)

- Australia won the toss and elected to bat.

24 January 2010
Scorecard

Sri Lanka; 293/8 (50 overs)	v	South Africa; 145 (36.4 overs)
Bhanuka Rajapaksa 79 (78); Jerry Nqolo 2/46 (10 overs)		Joshua Richards 43 (52); Charith Jayampathi 4/31 (8 overs)

Sri Lanka won by 146 runs by (D/L method)
Bert Sutcliffe Oval, Lincoln
Umpires: Richard Kettleborough (Eng) and Shavir Tarapore (Ind)
Player of the match: Bhanuka Rajapaksa (SL)

- South Africa won the toss and elected to field.
- South Africa were set a revised target of 292 runs from 49 overs due to rain.

==== Plate quarter-finals ====
23 January 2010
Scorecard

United States; 13/0 (3 overs)	v	Canada
SR Taylor 6 (13); Zain Mahmood 0/6 [2]

Match abandoned – Canada progress.
McLean Park, Napier
Umpires: IN Ramage (Sco) and Shahul Hameed (Indon)

- United States of America won the toss and elected to bat.
- Match was abandoned after 3 overs due to rain.

23 January 2010
Scorecard

Zimbabwe; 102 (26.2 overs)	v	Ireland; 110/3 (20.2 overs)
PJ Moor 28 (48); CA Young 4/14 [7]		PR Stirling 62 (50); SM Mugava 1/18 [6]

Ireland won by 7 wickets
Nelson Park, Napier
Umpires: Nadir Shah (Ban) and Buddhi Pradhan (Nep)
Player of the match: CA Young (Ire)

- Ireland won the toss and elected to field.

24 January 2010
Scorecard

Papua New Guinea; 173/9 (50 overs)	v	Afghanistan; 143 (37.3 overs)
S Eno 55* (100); Aftab Alam 6/33 [10]		Khushal Rasooli 48 (83); RC Haoda 5/34 [8.3]

Papua New Guinea won by 30 runs.
Nelson Park, Napier
Umpires: SS Prasad (Sin) and IN Ramage (Sco)
Player of the match: RC Haoda

- Afghanistan won the toss and elected to field.

24 January 2010
Scorecard

Hong Kong; 156 (49 overs)	v	Bangladesh; 157/6 (40.4 overs)
Nizakat Khan 56* (90); Shaker Ahmed 4/26 [10]		Mominul Haque 35 (51); Aditya Kanthan 2/21 [4]

Bangladesh won by 4 wickets.
McLean Park, Napier
Umpires: O Chirombe (Zim) and Nadeem Ghauri (Pak)
Player of the match: Shaker Ahmed (Ban)

- Hong Kong won the toss and elected to bat.

=== Semi-finals ===
==== Super semi-finals ====
25 January 2010
Scorecard

West Indies; 212/8 (50 overs)	v	Pakistan; 213/6 (48.3 overs)
KC Brathwaite 85 (116); Sarmad Bhatti 2/37 [10]		Hammad Azam 92* (93); JO Holder 2/28 [10]

Pakistan won by 4 wickets.
Bert Sutcliffe Oval, Lincoln
Umpires: HDPK Dharmasena (SL) and BNJ Oxenford (Aus)
Player of the match: Hammad Azam (Pak)

- Pakistan won the toss and elected to field.

27 January 2010
Scorecard

Sri Lanka; 205 (48.2 overs)	v	Australia; 206/8 (48.3 overs)
MAP Fernando 52 (88); JR Hazlewood 4/26 [8.2]		MR Marsh 97 (110); WMC Jayampathi 3/34 [10]

Australia won by 2 wickets.
Bert Sutcliffe Oval, Lincoln
Umpires: RA Kettleborough (Eng) and Shavir Tarapore (Ind)
Player of the match: MR Marsh (Aus)

- Sri Lanka won the toss and elected to bat.

==== 5th place semi-finals ====
25 January 2010
Scorecard

England; 176 (49.2 overs)	v	India; 179/3 (36.4 overs)
JC Buttler 78 (125); AL Menaria 4/35 [10]		PA Reddy 94 (116); NL Buck 2/41 [9]

India won by 7 wickets.
Hagley Oval, Christchurch
Umpires: GAV Baxter (NZ) and BG Jerling (SA)
Player of the match: PA Reddy (Ind)

- England won the toss and elected to bat.

25 January 2010
Scorecard

New Zealand; 250 (49.4 overs)	v	South Africa; 252/1 (48.1 overs)
CJ Anderson 64 (70); JDS Neesham 64 (70); KO Wernars 3/42 [7.4]		DA Hendricks 107* (141); HKP Boam 1/67 [9.1]

South Africa won by 9 wickets.
Lincoln Oval, Christchurch
Umpires: PK Baldwin (Ger) and NA Malcolm (WI)
Player of the match: DA Hendricks (SA)

- South Africa won the toss and elected to field.

==== Plate semi-finals ====
25 January 2010
Scorecard

Canada	v	Ireland

Match abandoned – Ireland progress.
Fitzherbert Park, Palmerston North
Umpires: NG Bagh (Den) and Nadeem Ghauri (Pak)

26 January 2010
Scorecard

Bangladesh; 253 (49.4 overs)	v	Papua New Guinea; 85 (32.5 overs)
Noor Hossain 66 (50); J Kila 2/25 [10]		J Kila 17 (21); Noor Hossain 4/11 [5.5]

Bangladesh won by 168 runs.
Fitzherbert Park, Palmerston North
Umpires: NG Bagh (Den) and O Chirombe (Zim)
Player of the match: Noor Hossain

- Bangladesh won the toss and elected to bat.

==== 13th place semi-finals ====
25 January 2010
Scorecard

Afghanistan; 151/5 (32 overs)	v	Hong Kong; 153/6 (30.1 overs)
Noor-ul-Haq 61 (88); Ashish Gadhia 2/18 [6]		Irfan Ahmed 68 (81); Aftab Alam 4/31 [7]

Hong Kong won by 4 wickets.
McLean Park, Napier
Umpires: Nadir Shah (Ban) SS Prasad (Sin)
Player of the match: Irfan Ahmed (HK)

- Afghanistan won the toss and elected to bat.
- Match reduced to 32 overs due to rain.

25 January 2010
Scorecard

United States; 115 (33.1 overs)	v	Zimbabwe; 119/5 (29 overs)
GR Sewdial 35 (45); N Mushangwe 3/13 [6]		TC Mutombodzi 39 (57); Saqib Saleem 4/38 [9]

Zimbabwe won by 5 wickets.
Nelson Park, Napier
Umpires: BB Pradhan (Nep) and Shahul Hameed (Indon)
Player of the match: N Mushangwe

- Zimbabwe won the toss and elected to field.

=== Play-off finals ===
==== 15th place play-off ====
27 January 2010
Scorecard

Afghanistan; 86 (32.2 overs)	v	United States; 87/1 (14.2 overs)
Khushal Rasooli 23 (49); H Shahid 3/18 [7]		SR Taylor 30 (24); Izatullah Dawlatzai 1/25 [5]

United States won by 9 wickets.
Nelson Park, Napier
Umpires: SS Prasad (SIN) and Shahul Hameed (INA)
Player of the match: H Shahid (USA)

- Afghanistan won the toss and elected to bat.

==== 13th place play-off ====
27 January 2010
Scorecard

Zimbabwe; 235/8 (50 overs)	v	Hong Kong; 98 (36.4 overs)
PJ Moor 46 (54); MC Tucker 3/32 [10]		Ashish Gadhia 16 (28); N Mushangwe 4/18 [7.4]

Zimbabwe won by 137 runs.
McLean Park, Napier
Umpires: Nadir Shah (Ban) and BB Pradhan (Nep)
Player of the match: N Mushangwe (Zim)

- Hong Kong won the toss and elected to field.

==== 11th place play-off ====
28 January 2010
Scorecard

Papua New Guinea; 145 (47.1 overs)	v	Canada; 146/8 (49.1 overs)
H Siaka 50 (78); NR Kumar 3/23 [7.1]		NR Kumar 38 (72); RC Haoda 2/25 [10]

Canada won by 2 wickets.
Nelson Park, Napier
Umpires: NG Bagh (Den) and Nadir Shah (Ban)
Player of the match: NR Kumar (Can)

- Papua New Guinea won the toss and elected to bat.

==== Plate final ====
28 January 2010
Scorecard

Bangladesh; 307/8 (50 overs)	v	Ireland; 112 (38.5 overs)
Mominul Haque 81 (100); A Balbirnie 4/59 [10]		BJ Ackland 34* (100); Kamrul Islam Rabbi 3/21 [4.5]

Bangladesh won by 195 runs.
McLean Park, Napier
Umpires: O Chirombe (Zim) and Nadeem Ghauri (Pak)
Player of the match: Mominul Haque (Ban)

- Ireland won the toss and elected to field.
- Kamrul Islam Rabbi took a hat-trick.

==== 7th place play-off ====
26 January 2010
Scorecard

England; 228/9 (50 overs)	v	New Zealand; 229/8 (49.4 overs)
JK Manuel 43 (53); TG Johnston 3/40 [10]		C Cachopa 64 (85); MP Dunn 3/37 [8]

New Zealand won by 2 wickets.
Village Green, Christchurch
Umpires: HDPK Dharmasena (SL) and BG Jerling (SA)
Player of the match: LV van Beek (NZ)

- New Zealand won the toss and elected to field.

==== 5th place play-off ====
27 January 2010
Scorecard

India; 235/9 (50 overs)	v	South Africa; 237/4 (48.5 overs)
Zahid Ali 98 (107); GI Hume 3/31 [10]		DJ White 77 (114); SN Netravalkar 1/31 [9]

South Africa won by 6 wickets.
Village Green, Christchurch
Umpires: NA Malcolm (WI) and BNJ Oxenford (Aus)
Player of the match: GI Hume (SA)

- India won the toss and elected to bat.

==== 3rd place play-off ====
29 January 2010
Scorecard

Sri Lanka; 291/6 (50 overs)	v	West Indies; 294/6 (48.3 overs)
DDM Rajakaruna 94 (118); NA Bolan 2/74 [10]		Y Cariah 110* (127); KPCM Peiris 3/39 [9.3]

West Indies won by 4 wickets.
Village Green, Christchurch
Umpires: BNJ Oxenford (Aus) and SK Tarapore (Ind)
Player of the match: Y Cariah (WI)

- West Indies won the toss and elected to field.

=== Final ===
30 January 2010
Scorecard

Australia; 207/9 (50 overs)	v	Pakistan; 182 (46.4 overs)
Kane Richardson 44 (44); Sarmad Bhatti 3/33 (8)		Azeem Ghumman 41 (90); Josh Hazlewood 4/30 (8.4)

Australia won by 25 runs
Bert Sutcliffe Oval, Lincoln
Umpires: Kumar Dharmasena (SL) and Richard Kettleborough (Eng)
Player of the match: Josh Hazlewood (Aus)

- Pakistan won the toss and elected to field

== Final standings ==
Position	Team
1	Australia
2	Pakistan
3	West Indies
4	Sri Lanka
5	South Africa
6	India
7	New Zealand
8	England
9	Bangladesh
10	Ireland
11	Canada
12	Papua New Guinea
13	Zimbabwe
14	Hong Kong
15	United States
16	Afghanistan

== Future senior players ==
Future players that featured for their national team in the tournament were:

Team	Future senior cricketers
Afghanistan	Noor-ul-Haq; Afsar Zazai; Aftab Alam; Hamza Hotak; Hashmatullah Shaidi; Izatullah Dawlatzai; Javed Ahmadi; Yamin Ahmadzai; Zakiullah Zaki
Australia	Mitchell Marsh; Josh Hazlewood; Nic Maddinson; Kane Richardson; Adam Zampa
Bangladesh	Abul Hasan; Anamul Haque; Kamrul Islam Rabbi; Mominul Haque; Nurul Hasan; Sabbir Rahman; Soumya Sarkar
Canada	Rustam Bhatti; Hiral Patel; Arsalan Qadir; Manny Aulakh; Parth Desai; Ruvindu Gunasekera; Hamza Tariq; Nitish Kumar; Usman Limbada
England	James Vince; Danny Briggs; Jos Buttler; Joe Root; Ben Stokes
Hong Kong	Jamie Atkinson; Irfan Ahmed; Mark Chapman; Nizakat Khan; Waqas Barkat
India	Mandeep Singh; Mayank Agarwal; Saurabh Netravalkar; Harshal Patel; KL Rahul; Sandeep Sharma; Jaydev Unadkat
Ireland	Andrew Balbirnie; Paul Stirling; George Dockrell; Shane Getkate; Graeme McCarter; Stuart Poynter; Eddie Richardson; James Shannon; Stuart Thompson; Craig Young
New Zealand	Corey Anderson; Tom Blundell; Doug Bracewell; Michael Bracewell; Dane Cleaver; Tom Latham; James Neesham; Logan van Beek; Ben Wheeler
Pakistan	Ahmed Shehzad; Babar Azam; Hammad Azam; Raza Hasan; Usman Qadir
Papua New Guinea	Jason Kila; John Reva; Charles Amini; Sese Bau; Raymond Haoda; Lega Siaka; Tony Ura
South Africa	Colin Ackermann; Graham Hume
Sri Lanka	Andri Berenger; Kithuruwan Vithanage; Dhanushka Gunathilaka; Bhanuka Rajapaksa
West Indies	Jermaine Blackwood; Kraigg Brathwaite; John Campbell; Shane Dowrich; Jason Holder; Evin Lewis; Jomel Warrican
Zimbabwe	Peter Moor; Tendai Chatara; Natsai M'shangwe; Tinotenda Mutombodzi

== Media coverage ==
- Supersport (live) – South Africa
- STAR Cricket (live) – India
- SKY Sport (live) – New Zealand
- GEO Super (live) – Pakistan
- PTV Home (live) – Pakistan
- Fox Sports (live) – Australia
- Sky Sports (live) – United Kingdom
- ART Prime Sports (live) – Middle East
