= Ireland under-19 cricket team =

Ireland
- Association: Cricket Ireland

Personnel
- Coach: Ryan Eagleson
- Manager: Brian O'Rourke

Team information
- Colours: Green
- Founded: 1998
- Home ground: Castle Avenue cricket ground
- Capacity: 3,200

International Cricket Council
- ICC region: Europe
Test kit
ODI kit
T20I kit
- As of 20 December 2023

The Ireland national under-19 cricket team represents All-Ireland in under-19 international cricket.

Ireland has qualified for the Under-19 Cricket World Cup on eight occasions, most recently in 2018. Ireland's best result came at the 2010 World Cup in New Zealand, where they finished tenth.

== History ==
Among other ICC full members, Ireland has beaten only Afghanistan (once) and Zimbabwe (twice) at the Under-19 World Cup. At the time of their victories over Zimbabwe, Ireland was an associate member.

Ireland was added to the 2016 Under-19 Cricket World Cup on 6 January 2016, after Australian under-19s withdrew due to security concerns. They announced their squad two days later.

== Under-19 World Cup record ==
Ireland's U19 World Cup record
Year	Result	Pos	№	Pld	W	L	T	NR
(Australia) 1988	Ineligible – not an ICC member							
(South Africa) 1998	First round	14th	16	6	1	5	0	0
(Sri Lanka) 2000	First round	12th	16	7	2	4	1	0
(Bangladesh) 2004	First round	11th	16	6	3	3	0	0
(Sri Lanka) 2006	First round	13th	16	6	2	4	0	0
(Malaysia) 2008	First round	13th	16	6	2	4	0	0
(New Zealand) 2010	First round	10th	16	6	2	3	0	1
(Australia) 2012	First round	12th	16	6	2	4	0	0
(United Arab Emirates) 2014	did not qualify							
(Bangladesh) 2016	First round	13th	16	6	2	4	0	0
(New Zealand) 2018	First round	13th	16	6	3	3	0	0
(South Africa) 2020	did not qualify							
(Cricket West Indies) 2022	First Round	10th	16	6	3	3	0	0
(South Africa) 2024	Super 6	8th	16	7	2	5	0	0
(Namibia) (Zimbabwe) 2026	Super 6	11th	16	7	1	6	0	0
Total				75	25	48	1	1

== Squad ==
2026 Under-19 Men's Cricket World Cup Squad

- Oliver Riley (c)
- Reuben Wilson (vc)
- Alex Armstrong
- Callum Armstrong
- Marko Bates
- Sebastian Dijkstra
- Thomas Ford
- Samuel Haslett
- Adam Leckey
- Febin Manoj
- Luke Murray
- Robert O'Brien
- Freddie Ogilby
- James West
- Bruce Whaley

== Records ==
All records listed are for under-19 One Day International (ODI) matches only.

=== Team records ===
Highest totals

- 329/9 (50 overs), v. Uganda, at Chattogram, 23 February 2004
- 304/9 (50 overs), v. New Zealand, at Colombo, 14 February 2006
- 291/9 (50 overs), v. Australia, at Chattogram, 29 February 2004
- 288/6 (50 overs), v. Namibia, at Lincoln, 27 January 2018
- 278/8 (50 overs), v. West Indies, at Lincoln, 23 January 2018

Lowest totals

- 65 (24.2 overs), v. Australia, at Queenstown, 17 January 2010
- 71 (27.5 overs), v. Zimbabwe, at Crab Hill, 30 December 2021
- 78 (30 overs), v. South Africa, at Kurunegala, 23 January 2000
- 97 (29.1 overs), v. Zimbabwe, at Colombo, 5 February 2006
- 97 (28.5 overs), v. Pakistan, at Whangārei, 16 January 2018

=== Individual records ===
Most career runs

- 606 – Eoin Morgan (2004-2006)
- 318 – Gary Wilson (2004-2006)
- 296 – Paul Stirling (2008-2010)
- 249 – Harry Tector (2016-2018)
- 241 – Kevin O'Brien (2004)

Highest individual scores

- 124 (126 balls) – Eoin Morgan, v. New Zealand at Colombo, 14 February 2006
- 117 (129 balls) – Eoin Morgan, v. Uganda, at Chattogram, 23 February 2004
- 114 (102 balls) – Paul Stirling, v. United States, at Queenstown, 19 January 2010
- 111* (113 balls) – Josh Cox, v. Uganda, at Georgetown, 15 January 2022
- 101 (113 balls) – Harry Tector, v. Namibia, at Lincoln, 27 January 2018

Most career wickets

- 27 – Greg Thompson (2004-2008)
- 20 – Matthew Humphreys (2021-2022)
- 18 – Dwayne McGerrigle (1998-2000)
- 16 – Gary Kidd (2004-2006)
- 15 – George Dockrell (2010-2012), James Hall (2006-2008)

Best bowling performances

- 6/50 (9.4 overs) – Niall McDarby, v. England, at Colombo, 8 February 2006
- 5/16 (10 overs) – Keith Spelman, v. Papua New Guinea, at Johannesburg, 19 January 1998
- 5/20 (7.4 overs) – Muzamil Sherzad, v. Zimbabwe, at Port-of-Spain, 29 January 2022
- 5/21 (6.4 overs) – Reuben Wilson, v. Zimbabwe, at Cave Hill, 2 January 2022
- 5/26 (10 overs) – Dwayne McGerrigle, v. Denmark, at Boksburg, 12 January 1998
