= Zimbabwe national under-19 cricket team =

Cricket team

Zimbabwe

Personnel
- Captain: Matthew Schonken
- Coach: Prosper Utseya
- Owner: Zimbabwe Cricket

The Zimbabwe national under-19 cricket team represents Zimbabwe in under-19 international cricket. The team is controlled by Zimbabwe Cricket (ZC).

Zimbabwe has automatically qualified for the Under-19 Cricket World Cup on every occasion since 1998, by virtue of being a full member of the International Cricket Council (ICC).

The coach of the team for the 2024 Under-19 Cricket World Cup was Prosper Utseya, and the team captain was Matthew Schonken.

== History ==
Zimbabwe has made the second round of the Under-19 World Cup on three occasions – in South Africa 1998, Bangladesh 2004 and Sri Lanka 2006. In the last of those, Zimbabwe emerged from the first round undefeated, but lost easily to Pakistan in the quarter-finals.

Mluleki Nkala (1998) and Waddington Mwayenga (2002) were the equal leading wicket-takers in their respective tournaments.

Zimbabwe's worst result came at the 2012 World Cup in Australia, where the team suffered defeats to Scotland and Papua New Guinea before regaining some credibility by defeating Namibia in the play-off for 15th place.

== Under-19 World Cup record ==
Zimbabwe's U19 World Cup record
| Year | Result | Pos | № | Pld | W | L | T | NR |
|---|---|---|---|---|---|---|---|---|
| (Australia) 1988 | Part of ICC Associates XI | | | | | | | |
| (South Africa) 1998 | Second round | 8th | 16 | 6 | 2 | 4 | 0 | 0 |
| (Sri Lanka) 2000 | First round | 11th | 16 | 7 | 3 | 4 | 0 | 0 |
| (New Zealand) 2002 | First round | 9th | 16 | 8 | 6 | 2 | 0 | 0 |
| (Bangladesh) 2004 | Second round | 6th | 16 | 6 | 3 | 3 | 0 | 0 |
| (Sri Lanka) 2006 | Second round | 7th | 16 | 5 | 3 | 2 | 0 | 0 |
| (Malaysia) 2008 | First round | 14th | 16 | 6 | 1 | 5 | 0 | 0 |
| (New Zealand) 2010 | First round | 13th | 16 | 6 | 2 | 4 | 0 | 0 |
| (Australia) 2012 | First round | 15th | 16 | 6 | 2 | 4 | 0 | 0 |
| (United Arab Emirates) 2014 | First round | 11th | 16 | 6 | 3 | 3 | 0 | 0 |
| (Bangladesh) 2016 | First round | 10th | 16 | 6 | 3 | 3 | 0 | 0 |
| (New Zealand) 2018 | First round | 11th | 16 | 6 | 3 | 3 | 0 | 0 |
| (South Africa) 2020 | First round | 11th | 16 | 6 | 3 | 3 | 0 | 0 |
| (Cricket West Indies) 2022 | First round | 12th | 16 | 6 | 2 | 4 | 0 | 0 |
| (South Africa) 2024 | Super six | 12th | 16 | 0 | 0 | 0 | 0 | 0 |
| (Zimbabwe) (Namibia) 2026 | Super six | 12th | 16 | 0 | 0 | 0 | 0 | 0 |
| Total | | | | 80 | 32 | 48 | 0 | 0 |

== Records ==
All records listed are for under-19 One Day International (ODI) matches only.

=== Team records ===
Highest totals

- 354/8 (50 overs), v. Scotland, at Diamond Oval, Kimberley, 2 February 2020
- 321/9 (50 overs), v. Papua New Guinea, at Queen's Park Savannah, Port-of-Spain, 15 January 2022
- 291/7 (50 overs), v. Papua New Guinea, at Eden Park Outer Oval, Auckland, 27 January 2002
- 290/8 (48 overs), v. Kenya, at Recreation Ground, Klerksdorp, 13 January 1998
- 272/8 (50 overs), v. New Zealand, at Bangabandhu National Stadium, Dhaka, 27 February 2004
- 272/8 (50 overs), v. Canada, at Mainpower Oval, Rangiora, 28 January 2018

Lowest totals

- 59 (27.2 overs), v. Nepal, at Institute Perguruan Temenggong Ibrahim, Johor, 24 February 2008
- 63 (19.3 overs), v. Sri Lanka, at Boland Park, Paarl, 24 January 2017
- 66 (29.4 overs), v. Sri Lanka, at Wally Wilson Oval, Cape Town, 16 January 2017
- 71 (36.2 overs), v. New Zealand, at Bert Sutcliffe Oval, Lincoln, 21 January 2002
- 84 (40.5 overs), v. Bangladesh, at Zahur Ahmed Chowdhury Stadium, Chittagong, 14 November 2015

=== Individual records ===
Most career runs

- 724 – Ryan Burl (2011-2014)
- 710 – Wesley Madhevere (2015-2020)
- 503 – Milton Shumba (2016-2020)
- 458 – Ryan Murray (2015-2017)
- 449 – Emmanuel Bawa (2020-2022)

Highest individual scores

- 127 (145 balls) – Brendan Taylor, v. New Zealand, at Bangabandhu National Stadium, Dhaka, 27 February 2004
- 118 (107 balls) – Malcolm Lake, v. India, at Tony Ireland Stadium, Townsville, 14 August 2012
- 116* (120 balls) – Peter Moor, v. South Africa, at Harare Sports Club, Harare, 11 July 2010
- 112* (84 balls) – Mark Vermeulen, v. Papua New Guinea, at Recreation Ground, Klerksdorp, 13 January 1998
- 105* (95 balls) – Emmanuel Bawa, v. Canada, at North-West University No 2 Ground, Potchefstroom, 28 January 2020

Most career wickets

- 42 – Wesley Madhevere (2015-2020)
- 21 – Luke Jongwe (2012-2014)
- 20 – Mluleki Nkala (1997-2000)
- 18 – Roy Kaia (2009-2011), Natsai M'shangwe (2009-2010)

Best bowling performances

- 6/31 (9 overs) – Tinashe Panyangara, v. Australia, at Shaheed Chandu Stadium, Bogra, 18 February 2004
- 5/21 (10 overs) – Waddington Mwayenga, v. Kenya, at Eden Park Outer Oval, Auckland, 27 January 2002
- 5/24 (9.4 overs) – Wesley Madhevere, v. Fiji, at MA Aziz Stadium, Chittagong, 29 January 2016
- 5/25 (7 overs) – David Mutendera, v. Papua New Guinea, at Recreation Ground, Klerksdorp, 13 January 1998
- 5/25 (8.2 overs) – Roy Kaia, v. Pakistan, at Harare Sports Club, Harare, 1 October 2009

== 2022 World Cup squad ==
Zimbabwe's squad for the 2022 World Cup in West Indies was announced on 8 December 2021.

- Emmanuel Bawa (c)
- Brian Bennett (c)
- David Bennett
- Victor Chirwa
- Mgcini Dube
- Alex Falao
- Tendekai Mataranyika
- Tashinga Makoni
- Connor Mitchell
- Steven Saul
- Matthew Schonken
- Panashe Taruvinga
- Matthew Welch
- Rogan Wolhuter
- Ngenyasha Zvinoera
