= Calum Price =

Zimbabwean cricketer (born 1992)

Personal information
- Full name: Calum Walter Price
- Born: 4 January 1992 (age 34); Harare, Zimbabwe
- Batting: Right-handed
- Bowling: Right-arm medium
- Role: Bowler
- Relatives: Ryan Higgins (cousin); Dylan Higgins (cousin)

Domestic team information
- Years: Team
- 2010/11: Mashonaland Eagles
- 2011/12–2012/13: Mountaineers

Career statistics
| Competition | First-class | List A |
|---|---|---|
| Matches | 5 | 1 |
| Runs scored | 28 | 0 |
| Batting average | 9.33 | – |
| 100s/50s | 0/0 | 0/0 |
| Top score | 20* | 0* |
| Balls bowled | 795 | 30 |
| Wickets | 13 | 0 |
| Bowling average | 25.92 | – |
| 5 wickets in innings | 0 | – |
| 10 wickets in match | 0 | – |
| Best bowling | 3/23 | – |
| Catches/stumpings | 3/– | 1/– |
- Source: CricketArchive, 4 May 2025

Calum Walter Price (born 4 January 1992) is a Zimbabwean former cricketer. Along with the likes of Keegan Meth and Kyle Jarvis, he is regarded as a great future pace prospect for Zimbabwe. Price belongs to a sporting family; his cousin Ryan Higgins, regarded as the second best leg spinner Zimbabwe has produced before taking an early retirement, played ODIs for Zimbabwe and his cousin Dylan captained the Under-19 team at the 2010 World Cup in New Zealand.

== Career ==
Price made his first-class cricket debut for the Mashonaland Eagles in a Logan Cup match against the Mid West Rhinos at Harare Sports Club, Harare. He bowled with great pace and took two wickets in a heavy Eagles defeat. Price took his first first-class wicket with the dismissal of Simon Mugava who nicked the ball to the keeper, and then also clean-bowled Justin Lewis. He also made 8 runs in that match.
