= 2004 Under-19 Cricket World Cup =

Cricket tournament

2004 ICC Under-19 Cricket World Cup
- Dates: 15 February – 5 March 2004
- Administrator: ICC
- Cricket format: Limited-overs (50 overs)
- Host: Bangladesh
- Champions: Pakistan (1st title)
- Runners-up: West Indies
- Participants: 16
- Matches: 54
- Player of the series: (India) Shikhar Dhawan
- Most runs: (India) Shikhar Dhawan (505)
- Most wickets: (Bangladesh) Enamul Haque (22)

The 2004 ICC Under-19 Cricket World Cup was an international limited-overs cricket tournament played in Bangladesh from 15 February to 5 March 2004. It was the fifth edition of the Under-19 Cricket World Cup and the first to be held in Bangladesh.

The 2004 World Cup was contested by sixteen teams, including one (Uganda) making its tournament debut. After an initial group stage, the top eight teams played off in a super league to decide the tournament champions, with the non-qualifiers playing a separate "plate" competition. Pakistan and the West Indies eventually progressed to the final, played at the Bangabandhu National Stadium in Dhaka, where Pakistan won by 25 runs to claim their maiden title. This was the first appearance of the West Indies in the final. Indian batsman Shikhar Dhawan was named player of the tournament as the leading run-scorer, while Bangladesh's Enamul Haque was the leading wicket-taker.

== Venues ==
Rajshahi	Bogura	Dhaka	Fatullah
Shaheed Qamaruzzaman Stadium	Shaheed Chandu Stadium	Bangabandhu National Stadium	Khan Shaheb Osman Ali Stadium
Capacity: 15,000	Capacity: 18,000	Capacity: 36,000	Capacity: 25,000
Matches: 3	Matches: 3	Matches: 13	Matches: 6

Chattogram	Chattogram	Khulna	Savar
MA Aziz Stadium	Zahur Ahmed Chowdhury Stadium	Sheikh Abu Naser Stadium	Bangladesh Krira Shikkha Protisthan cricket grounds
Capacity: 20,000	Capacity: 20,000	Capacity: 15,600	Capacity:
Matches: 10	Matches: 10	Matches: 6	Matches: 3

Venues in Bangladesh

== Teams and qualification ==
The ten full members of the International Cricket Council (ICC) qualified automatically:

- Australia
- Bangladesh
- England
- India
- New Zealand
- Pakistan
- South Africa
- Sri Lanka
- West Indies
- Zimbabwe

Another six teams qualified through regional qualification tournaments:

2003 Africa/EAP U19 Championship

- Papua New Guinea (1st place)
- Uganda (2nd place)

2003 Americas U19 Championship

- Canada (1st place)

2003 European U19 Championship

- Ireland (1st place)
- Scotland (2nd place)

2003 Youth Asia Cup

- Nepal (1st place)

== Group stage ==
=== Group A ===
Pos	Team	Pld	W	L	T	NR	Pts	NRR
1	Sri Lanka	3	2	1	0	0	4	1.268
2	Zimbabwe	3	2	1	0	0	4	1.039
3	Australia	3	2	1	0	0	4	−0.306
4	Canada	3	0	3	0	0	0	−2.500

Source: CricketArchive

19 February
Scorecard

Zimbabwe; 161 (49.3 overs)	v	Sri Lanka; 162/8 (38.2 overs)

Sri Lanka won by 2 wickets
Shaheed Chandu Stadium, Bogra

16 February
Scorecard

Canada; 164 (45.1 overs)	v	Australia; 165/4 (28.4 overs)

Australia won by 6 wickets
Rajshahi Divisional Stadium, Rajshahi

17 February
Scorecard

Canada; 81 (31.1 overs)	v	Sri Lanka; 84/1 (16 overs)

Sri Lanka won by 9 wickets
Rajshahi Divisional Stadium, Rajshahi

18 February
Scorecard

Australia; 73 (19 overs)	v	Zimbabwe; 74/3 (17.1 overs)

Zimbabwe won by 7 wickets
Shaheed Chandu Stadium, Bogra

19 February
Scorecard

Canada; 180/9 (50 overs)	v	Zimbabwe; 183/2 (36.2 overs)

Zimbabwe won by 8 wickets
Shaheed Chandu Stadium, Bogra

20 February
Scorecard

Australia; 186/9 (50 overs)	v	Sri Lanka; 184 (49.1 overs)

Australia won by 2 runs
Rajshahi Divisional Stadium, Rajshahi

=== Group B ===
Pos	Team	Pld	W	L	T	NR	Pts	NRR
1	England	3	2	1	0	0	4	1.581
2	South Africa	3	2	1	0	0	4	0.607
3	Nepal	3	2	1	0	0	4	−0.110
4	Uganda	3	0	3	0	0	0	−2.164

Source: CricketArchive

28 February
Scorecard

Nepal; 191/8 (50 overs)	v	England; 192/2 (43 overs)

England won by 8 wickets
M. A. Aziz Stadium, Chittagong

16 February
Scorecard

Uganda; 125 (48.4 overs)	v	South Africa; 126/2 (28 overs)

South Africa won by 8 wickets
Zohur Ahmed Chowdhury Stadium, Chittagong

17 February
Scorecard

England; 259/7 (50 overs)	v	Uganda; 46 (30.4 overs)

England won by 213 runs
M. A. Aziz Stadium, Chittagong

18 February
Scorecard

South Africa; 156 (50 overs)	v	Nepal; 158/9 (49.4 overs)

Nepal won by 1 wicket
Zohur Ahmed Chowdhury Stadium, Chittagong

19 February
Scorecard

Uganda; 194 (49.5 overs)	v	Nepal; 195/5 (48.1 overs)

Nepal won by 5 wickets
M. A. Aziz Stadium, Chittagong

20 February
Scorecard

England; 189 (48.3 overs)	v	South Africa; 190/9 (47.3 overs)

South Africa won by 1 wicket
Zohur Ahmed Chowdhury Stadium, Chittagong

=== Group C ===
Pos	Team	Pld	W	L	T	NR	Pts	NRR
1	India	3	3	0	0	0	6	3.133
2	New Zealand	3	2	1	0	0	4	1.175
3	Bangladesh (H)	3	1	2	0	0	2	0.166
4	Scotland	3	0	3	0	0	0	−5.441

Source: CricketArchive
(H) Host

15 February
Scorecard

Bangladesh; 202 (46.3 overs)	v	New Zealand; 204/8 (49.2 overs)

New Zealand won by 2 wickets
Bangabandhu National Stadium, Dhaka

16 February
Scorecard

India; 425/3 (50 overs)	v	Scotland; 155/8 (50 overs)

India won by 270 runs
Bangabandhu National Stadium, Dhaka

17 February
Scorecard

Scotland; 95 (30.2 overs)	v	Bangladesh; 96/1 (12.2 overs)

Bangladesh won by 9 wickets
Fatullah Osmani Stadium, Fatullah

18 February
Scorecard

India; 215 (47.2 overs)	v	New Zealand; 146 (44.5 overs)

India won by 69 runs
Bangabandhu National Stadium, Dhaka

19 February
Scorecard

New Zealand; 389/2 (50 overs)	v	Scotland; 149 (33 overs)

New Zealand won by 240 runs
Bangladesh Krira Shikkha Protisthan Ground, Savar

20 February
Scorecard

India; 309/7 (50 overs)	v	Bangladesh; 178 (40.3 overs)

India won by 131 runs
Bangabandhu National Stadium, Dhaka

=== Group D ===
Pos	Team	Pld	W	L	T	NR	Pts	NRR
1	Pakistan	3	3	0	0	0	6	3.168
2	West Indies	3	2	1	0	0	4	−0.033
3	Ireland	3	1	2	0	0	2	−0.326
4	Papua New Guinea	3	0	3	0	0	0	−2.819

Source: CricketArchive

15 February
Scorecard

Papua New Guinea; 60 (17.5 overs)	v	Pakistan; 63/2 (14.5 overs)

Pakistan won by 8 wickets
Khulna Divisional Stadium, Khulna

16 February
Scorecard

West Indies; 265/8 (50 overs)	v	Ireland; 259/9 (50 overs)

West Indies won by 6 runs
Khulna Divisional Stadium, Khulna

17 February
Scorecard

Ireland; 142 (47.5 overs)	v	Pakistan; 146/2 (25.2 overs)

Pakistan won by 8 wickets
Khulna Divisional Stadium, Khulna

18 February
Scorecard

West Indies; 371/3 (50 overs)	v	Papua New Guinea; 219 (44.2 overs)

West Indies won by 152 runs
Khulna Divisional Stadium, Khulna

19 February
Scorecard

Ireland; 212 (49 overs)	v	Papua New Guinea; 142 (38.2 overs)

Ireland won by 70 runs
Khulna Divisional Stadium, Khulna

20 February
Scorecard

Pakistan; 251/9 (50 overs)	v	West Indies; 88 (27.3 overs)

Pakistan won by 163 runs
Khulna Divisional Stadium, Khulna

== Plate competition ==
The plate competition was contested by the eight teams that failed to qualify for the Super League.

=== Group 1 ===
Pos	Team	Pld	W	L	T	NR	Pts	NRR
1	Australia	3	3	0	0	0	6	2.820
2	Scotland	3	2	1	0	0	4	−0.550
3	Nepal	3	1	2	0	0	2	−0.139
4	Papua New Guinea	3	0	3	0	0	0	−1.942

Source: CricketArchive

22 February
Scorecard

Scotland; 22 (22.3 overs)	v	Australia; 23/0 (3.5 overs)

Australia won by 10 wickets
M. A. Aziz Stadium, Chittagong

- Scotland's total is the lowest in any Under-19 World Cup match.

22 February
Scorecard

Papua New Guinea; 168/9 (50 overs)	v	Nepal; 169/3 (39.2 overs)

Nepal won by 7 wickets
Chittagong Divisional Stadium, Chittagong

24 February
Scorecard

Papua New Guinea; 83 (35 overs)	v	Australia; 85/1 (18.2 overs)

Australia won by 9 wickets
Chittagong Divisional Stadium, Chittagong

24 February
Scorecard

Nepal; 200/9 (50 overs)	v	Scotland; 204/7 (49.5 overs)

Scotland won by 3 wickets
M. A. Aziz Stadium, Chittagong

26 February
Scorecard

Nepal; 154/9 (50 overs)	v	Australia; 158/4 (36.2 overs)

Australia won by 6 wickets
Chittagong Divisional Stadium, Chittagong

26 February
Scorecard

Papua New Guinea; 114 (32.2 overs)	v	Scotland; 115/3 (26.4 overs)

Scotland won by 7 wickets
M. A. Aziz Stadium, Chittagong

=== Group 2 ===
Pos	Team	Pld	W	L	T	NR	Pts	NRR
1	Bangladesh	3	3	0	0	0	6	1.897
2	Ireland	3	2	1	0	0	4	1.369
3	Uganda	3	1	2	0	0	2	−1.810
4	Canada	3	0	3	0	0	0	−1.655

Source: CricketArchive

23 February
Scorecard

Canada; 136 (37.2 overs)	v	Bangladesh; 139/6 (34.5 overs)

Bangladesh won by 4 wickets
Chittagong Divisional Stadium, Chittagong

23 February
Scorecard

Ireland; 329/9 (50 overs)	v	Uganda; 206 (45.2 overs)

Ireland won by 123 runs
M. A. Aziz Stadium, Chittagong

25 February
Scorecard

Uganda; 78 (33.3 overs)	v	Bangladesh; 79/6 (19.5 overs)

Bangladesh won by 4 wickets
Chittagong Divisional Stadium, Chittagong

25 February
Scorecard

Ireland; 265/9 (50 overs)	v	Canada; 110 (34.3 overs)

Ireland won by 155 runs
M. A. Aziz Stadium, Chittagong

27 February
Scorecard

Ireland; 141 (46.4 overs)	v	Bangladesh; 143/2 (30 overs)

Bangladesh won by 8 wickets
Chittagong Divisional Stadium, Chittagong

27 February
Scorecard

Canada; 231 (50 overs)	v	Uganda; 235/5 (47.2 overs)

Uganda won by 5 wickets
M. A. Aziz Stadium, Chittagong

=== Semi-finals ===
29 February
Scorecard

Australia; 340/5 (50 overs)	v	Ireland; 291/9 (50 overs)
Matthew Harrison 91 (78); Greg Thompson 2/48 (10 overs)		Eoin Morgan 65 (69); Gary Putland 3/71 (10 overs)

Australia won by 49 runs
M. A. Aziz Stadium, Chittagong

- Australia won the toss and elected to bat.

1 March
Scorecard

Bangladesh; 197 (49.5 overs)	v	Scotland; 106 (33.3 overs)
Abul Bashar 29 (25); Ian Young 1/23 (4 overs)		Kyle Coetzer 41 (71); Nazmul Hossain 4/11 (6.3 overs)

Bangladesh won by 91 runs
Chittagong Divisional Stadium, Chittagong

- Bangladesh won the toss and elected to bat.

=== Final ===
4 March
Scorecard

Bangladesh; 257/9 (50 overs)	v	Australia; 249 (49.3 overs)
Naeem Islam 66 (100); Ahillen Beadle 2/26 (5 overs)		Steve O'Keefe 65 (66); Enamul Haque 5/31 (9.3 overs)

Bangladesh won by 8 runs
Fatullah Osmani Stadium, Fatullah

- Bangladesh won the toss and elected to bat.

== Super League ==
=== Group 1 ===
Pos	Team	Pld	W	L	T	NR	Pts	NRR
1	India	3	2	1	0	0	4	0.993
2	West Indies	3	2	1	0	0	4	−0.287
3	Sri Lanka	3	1	2	0	0	2	−0.307
4	South Africa	3	1	2	0	0	2	−0.400

Source: CricketArchive

22 February
Scorecard

South Africa; 226/5 (50 overs)	v	India; 223 (47.1 overs)

South Africa won by 3 runs
National Stadium, Dhaka

22 February
Scorecard

West Indies; 200/7 (50 overs)	v	Sri Lanka; 181 (49 overs)

West Indies won by 19 runs
Fatullah Osmani Stadium, Fatullah

24 February
Scorecard

India; 253/9 (50 overs)	v	West Indies; 157 (39.1 overs)

India won by 96 runs
National Stadium, Dhaka

24 February
Scorecard

Sri Lanka; 277/5 (50 overs)	v	South Africa; 248 (48.3 overs)

Sri Lanka won by 29 runs
Fatullah Osmani Stadium, Fatullah

26 February
Scorecard

India; 316/5 (50 overs)	v	Sri Lanka; 260 (46 overs)

India won by 56 runs
National Stadium, Dhaka

26 February
Scorecard

West Indies; 284/6 (50 overs)	v	South Africa; 250 (50 overs)

West Indies won by 34 runs
Fatullah Osmani Stadium, Fatullah

=== Group 2 ===
Pos	Team	Pld	W	L	T	NR	Pts	NRR
1	England	3	3	0	0	0	6	0.719
2	Pakistan	3	2	1	0	0	4	1.077
3	Zimbabwe	3	1	2	0	0	2	0.005
4	New Zealand	3	0	3	0	0	0	−1.872

Source: CricketArchive

23 February
Scorecard

England; 306/2 (50 overs)	v	New Zealand; 209 (42.2 overs)

England won by 97 runs
Bangabandhu National Stadium, Dhaka

23 February
Scorecard

Zimbabwe; 141 (47.4 overs)	v	Pakistan; 143/1 (30 overs)

Pakistan won by 9 wickets
Bangladesh Krira Shikkha Protisthan Ground, Savar

25 February
Scorecard

Zimbabwe; 218/9 (50 overs)	v	England; 219/4 (49 overs)

England won by 6 wickets
Bangladesh Krira Shikkha Protisthan Ground, Savar

25 February
Scorecard

New Zealand; 181/8 (50 overs)	v	Pakistan; 184/2 (34.2 overs)

Pakistan won by 8 wickets
Bangabandhu National Stadium, Dhaka

27 February
Scorecard

England; 196 (50 overs)	v	Pakistan; 191 (47.4 overs)

England won by 5 runs
Fatullah Osmani Stadium, Fatullah

27 February
Scorecard

Zimbabwe; 272/8 (50 overs)	v	New Zealand; 180 (42 overs)

Zimbabwe won by 92 runs
Bangabandhu National Stadium, Dhaka

=== Semi-finals ===
29 February
Scorecard

India; 169 (47.3 overs)	v	Pakistan; 171/5 (44.5 overs)
Robin Uthappa 33 (67); Sulaman Qadir 2/27 (10 overs)		Tariq Mahmood 45* (61); R. P. Singh 2/25 (10 overs)

Pakistan won by 5 wickets
Bangabandhu National Stadium, Dhaka

- India won the toss and elected to bat.

2 March
Scorecard

West Indies; 249/6 (50 overs)	v	England; 155 (39.1 overs)
Denesh Ramdin 72 (85); Adam Harrison 3/28 (10 overs)		Tim Bresnan 41 (40); Ravi Rampaul 3/27 (7.1 overs)

West Indies won by 94 runs
Bangabandhu National Stadium, Dhaka

- West Indies won the toss and elected to bat.

=== Final ===
5 March
Scorecard

Pakistan; 230/9 (50 overs)	v	West Indies; 205 (47.1 overs)
Asif Iqbal 54 (72); Rishi Bachan 3/34 (10 overs)		Denesh Ramdin 36 (61); Tariq Mahmood 3/34 (10 overs)

Pakistan won by 25 runs
Bangabandhu National Stadium, Dhaka
Umpires: Jeremy Lloyds (Eng) and Peter Parker (Aus)
Player of the match: Asif Iqbal (Pak)

- Pakistan won the toss and elected to bat.

== Future senior players ==
Future players that featured for their national team in the tournament were:

Team	Future senior cricketers
Australia	Tim Paine; Moises Henriques; Steve O'Keefe
Bangladesh	Aftab Ahmed; Dhiman Ghosh; Enamul Haque; Mahmudullah Riyad; Nadif Chowdhury; Naeem Islam; Nafees Iqbal; Nazimuddin; Nazmul Hossain; Shahadat Hossain; Talha Jubair
Canada	Umar Bhatti; Trevin Bastiampillai; Shaheed Keshvani; Mohammad Qazi; Durand Soraine
England	Samit Patel; Ravi Bopara; Tim Bresnan; Alastair Cook; Steven Davies; Liam Plunkett; Luke Wright
India	Ambati Rayudu; Shikhar Dhawan; Dinesh Karthik; Suresh Raina; R. P. Singh; V. R. V. Singh; Robin Uthappa; • Faiz Fazal
Ireland	William Porterfield; Gary Kidd; Eoin Morgan; Kevin O'Brien; Boyd Rankin; Greg Thompson; Gary Wilson
Nepal	Shakti Gauchan; Paras Khadka; Basanta Regmi; Sharad Vesawkar
New Zealand	Anton Devcich; Daniel Flynn; BJ Watling
Pakistan	Khalid Latif; Abid Ali; Fawad Alam; Mansoor Amjad; Riaz Afridi; Wahab Riaz; Zulqarnain Haider
Papua New Guinea	Chris Amini; Mahuru Dai; Assad Vala; Jack Vare
Scotland	Kyle Coetzer; Gordon Goudie; Omer Hussain; Moneeb Iqbal; Ross Lyons
South Africa	Vernon Philander; Roelof van der Merwe; Vaughn van Jaarsveld
Sri Lanka	Farveez Maharoof; Kosala Kulasekara; Angelo Mathews; Suraj Randiv; Kaushal Silva; Upul Tharanga
West Indies	Denesh Ramdin; Lionel Baker; Kirk Edwards; Assad Fudadin; Xavier Marshall; Ravi Rampaul; Lendl Simmons
Zimbabwe	Tino Mawoyo; Elton Chigumbura; Graeme Cremer; Colin de Grandhomme; Craig Ervine; Tafadzwa Mufambisi; Tinashe Panyangara; Ed Rainsford; Brendan Taylor; Prosper Utseya; Sean Williams

== External Reference ==
EspnCricinfo
