= Arsalan Qadir =

Personal information
- Born: 15 September 1989 (age 37); Peshawar, Pakistan
- Batting: Right-handed
- Bowling: Right-arm medium-fast

International information
- National side: Canada (2010)
- Only T20I (cap 28): 10 February 2010 v Kenya
- Source: ESPN Cricinfo, 21 January 2016

Arsalan Qadir (born 15 September 1989) is a former international cricketer who played a single Twenty20 International match for the Canadian national team in 2010. He was born in Peshawar, Pakistan.

A right-arm pace bowler, Qadir played for the Canadian under-19s at the 2007 and 2009 editions of the Americas Under-19 Championship. Against the Cayman Islands under-19 side, at the 2007 tournament, he took figures of 5/6, helping to dismiss the team for only 77. At the 2009 Under-19 World Cup Qualifier, Qadir took 14 wickets from six matches, behind only Hiral Patel for Canada. This included figures of 6/44 against the United States and 4/19 against Uganda. Qadir was subsequently selected in Canada's squad for the 2010 Under-19 World Cup. However, at the tournament he managed only three wickets from his five games. The month after the Under-19 World Cup, Qadir was selected in Canada's senior squad for the 2010 World Twenty20 Qualifier in the United Arab Emirates. He played only one game, a Twenty20 International against Kenya, and failed to take a wicket, conceding 12 runs from his only over.
