= Kirk Wernars =

South African cricketer (born 1991)

Personal information
- Full name: Kirk Ogilvy Wernars
- Born: 14 June 1991 (age 35); Cape Town, Cape Province, South Africa
- Nickname: Leupels
- Batting: Left-handed
- Bowling: Right-arm fast-medium

Domestic team information
- Years: Team
- 2009/10–2010/11: Western Province
- 2011–2013: Sussex

Career statistics
Competition	FC	LA	T20
Matches	8	17	6
Runs scored	246	188	22
Batting average	27.33	26.85	4.40
100s/50s	0/2	0/0	0/0
Top score	53	37*	9
Balls bowled	513	353	18
Wickets	12	10	1
Bowling average	22.83	35.30	41.00
5 wickets in innings	0	1	0
10 wickets in match	0	0	0
Best bowling	2/11	6/27	1/21
Catches/stumpings	5/–	7/–	4/–
- Source: CricketArchive, 29 May 2013

Kirk Ogilvy Wernars (born 14 June 1991) is a South African cricketer. Wernars is a left-handed batsman who bowls right-arm fast-medium. He was born at Cape Town, Cape Province.

== Early career in South Africa ==
Before making his senior debut at any level, Wernars was selected to play for South Africa Under-19s, making his Youth One Day International debut against Sri Lanka Under-19s in December 2009 in a tri-series which also involved India Under-19s. He was selected as part of South Africa Under-19s fourteen man squad for the 2010 ICC Under-19 Cricket World Cup which was held in New Zealand in January 2010, with Wernars making six appearances during the tournament. taking 8 wickets at an average of 31.25, with best figures of 3/42. With the bat, he scored 31 runs with a high score of 21 not out.

Wernars later made his senior debut in March 2010 for Western Province in a List A match against Easterns in the 2009/10 CSA Provincial One-Day Competition, with him making a further appearance in that season's competition against Boland. It was in that season that he also made his debut in first-class cricket against Boland at Newlands in the 2009/10 CSA Provincial Three-Day Competition. The following season he made a further first-class appearance for Western Province against KwaZulu-Natal in the 2010/11 CSA Provincial Three-Day Competition. He also made ten List A appearances during the 2010/11 CSA Provincial One-Day Competition, with his final appearance in that format for Western Province coming against KwaZulu-Natal at Kingsmead. He took 7 wickets during the competition, 6 of which came against Gauteng, where he took figures of 6/27.

== Move to England ==
Wernars signed for English county side Sussex in 2011, qualifying to play for the county as a Dutch passport holder. He made his debut for Sussex against Yorkshire in the 2011 County Championship at the County Ground, Hove. He made two further first-class appearances in 2011, both coming in the County Championship against Worcestershire and Yorkshire. He made his maiden half century against Worcestershire, with a score of 53. As well as making a single List A appearance for Sussex against the touring Indians, he also made his Twenty20 debut in that same season, making two appearances in the 2011 Friends Life t20 against Middlesex at Lord's, and Somerset at the County Ground, Taunton. Following his first season with Sussex, he signed a two-year deal to keep him at Sussex until 2013.

Sussex were invited by the West Indies Cricket Board to take part in the 2011–12 Caribbean Twenty20 in January 2012 as an overseas team. Wernars was a part of the Sussex squad which took part in the tournament, with him making four appearances during it, against the Netherlands (also invited as an overseas team), Jamaica, Combined Campuses and Colleges, and Barbados. He had little success with the bat during the tournament, scoring just 13 runs in four innings. Wernars has spent much of the 2012 season playing for the Sussex Second XI, but he has played a single first-class match against the touring West Indians at Hove. His first County Championship appearance of 2012 came against Durham at Arundel Castle Cricket Ground. His first List A appearance of 2012 came against Northamptonshire in the 2012 Clydesdale Bank 40, with him making four further appearances in that season's competition, including featuring in the semi-final loss to Hampshire.
