= Darius D'Souza =

Indian-born Canadian cricketer

Personal information
- Full name: Darius D'Souza
- Born: 11 October 1989 (age 37); Bombay, Maharashtra, India
- Nickname: D, Dar
- Batting: Right-handed
- Bowling: Right-arm offspin

Domestic team information
- Years: Team
- 2011–2013: Loughborough MCCU

Career statistics
Competition	First-class
Matches	3
Runs scored	56
Batting average	11.20
100s/50s	–/–
Top score	23
Balls bowled	12
Wickets	–
Bowling average	–
5 wickets in innings	–
10 wickets in match	–
Best bowling	–
Catches/stumpings	–/–
- Source: ESPNcricinfo, 6 August 2020

Darius D'Souza (born 11 October 1989) is an Indian-born Canadian cricketer. D'Souza is a right-handed batsman who bowls right-arm off spin. He was born in Bombay (today Mumbai), Maharashtra.

D'Souza played for Canada Under-19s in the 2010 Under-19 World Cup in New Zealand, making five Youth One Day International appearance during the tournament. While studying for his degree in Computer Science & Business in England at Loughborough University, D'Souza made his first-class debut for Loughborough MCCU against Northamptonshire on 2 April 2011.
