= Noor-ul-Haq (cricketer) =

Afghan cricketer (born 1992)

Personal information
- Full name: Noor-ul-Haq Malekzai
- Born: 2 April 1992 (age 34); Laghman Province, Afghanistan
- Batting: Right-handed
- Bowling: Leg break

International information
- National side: Afghanistan
- ODI debut (cap 20): 17 August 2010 v Scotland
- Last ODI: 11 October 2010 v Kenya

Career statistics
| Competition | ODI | LA |
|---|---|---|
| Matches | 2 | 4 |
| Runs scored | 12 | 104 |
| Batting average | 6.00 | 26.00 |
| 100s/50s | –/– | –/– |
| Top score | 12 | 69 |
| Balls bowled | – | 6 |
| Wickets | – | 0 |
| Bowling average | – | – |
| 5 wickets in innings | – | – |
| 10 wickets in match | – | – |
| Best bowling | – | – |
| Catches/stumpings | 1 /– | 1/– |
- Source: Cricinfo, 1 October 2010

Noor-ul-Haq Malekzai (born 2 April 1992) is an Afghan cricketer, who has played for the national cricket team. He is a right-handed batsman who bowls leg break.

Noor started representing Afghanistan in age group cricket, which culminated in the Afghanistan Under-19 cricket team qualifying for the 2010 ICC Under-19 Cricket World Cup in New Zealand, for the first time in their history. This followed a successful 2009 ICC Under-19 Cricket World Cup Qualifier where he scored 216 runs at a batting average of 54.

His debut for the senior team came against Bahrain in the 2008 ACC Trophy Elite. His debut in List-A cricket also came in his debut One Day International match against Scotland during Afghanistan's tour of Scotland in 2010. During the match he scored 12 runs.

In Afghan domestic cricket he represents Kabul Province.

He made his Twenty20 debut for Amo Sharks in the 2017 Shpageeza Cricket League on 11 September 2017.
