= Naseer Jamali =

American international cricketer

Personal information
- Born: 10 September 1989 (age 37); Kabul, Afghanistan
- Batting: Right-handed
- Bowling: Left-arm fast-medium
- Role: Bowler
- Relatives: married 2019

International information
- National side: United States (2012–2015)
- Source: CricketArchive, 9 April 2016

Naseer Jamali (born 10 September 1989) is an American international cricketer who made his debut for the U.S. national team in 2012. He is a left-arm pace bowler.

Jamali was born in Kabul, Afghanistan, and spent part of his childhood in Peshawar, Pakistan, before immigrating to the U.S. as a teenager. He made his debut for the U.S. under-19s at the 2009 Americas Under-19 Championship, and went on to play for them at the 2009 World Cup Qualifier and eventually at the 2010 Under-19 World Cup. At the World Cup, played in New Zealand, he appeared in five of his team's six matches, but took only two wickets. Jamali made his senior debut for the U.S. in November 2012, in the Auty Cup game against Canada. His first international tournament was the 2013 Americas Twenty20 Division One event. Later in 2013, Jamali made a single appearance in the 2013 World Cricket League Division Three tournament, taking 1/21 against Bermuda. After that, his next major tournament was the 2015 World Twenty20 Qualifier, where matches held full Twenty20 status. In three matches at the Qualifier, Jamali took four wickets, including 3/12 on debut against Jersey and 1/19 against Papua New Guinea.

In June 2021, he was selected to take part in the Minor League Cricket tournament in the United States following the players' draft.
