= Zakiullah Zaki =

Afghan cricketer (born 1990)

Personal information
- Full name: Zakiullah Zaki
- Born: 15 July 1990 (age 36); Kabul, Afghanistan
- Batting: Right-handed
- Bowling: Leg break
- Role: Batsman

International information
- National side: Afghanistan
- Only ODI (cap 26): 29 March 2012 v Netherlands

Career statistics
Competition	ODI
Matches	1
Runs scored	3
Batting average	–
100s/50s	0/0
Top score	3
Balls bowled	24
Wickets	–
Bowling average	–
5 wickets in innings	–
10 wickets in match	–
Best bowling	–
Catches/stumpings	0/–
- Source: ESPNcricinfo

Zakiullah Zaki (born 15 July 1990) is an Afghan former cricketer. He played a single One Day International for Afghanistan in the World Cricket League. He also represented the country at the under-19 level during the 2010 Under-19 Cricket World Cup.
