= Papua New Guinea national under-19 cricket team =

Papua New Guinea Under-19s
- Nickname: Garamuts
- Association: Cricket PNG

International Cricket Council
- ICC region: East Asia-Pacific

International cricket
- First international: (Papua New Guinea) PNG vs. Bangladesh (Penang, Malaysia; 30 July 1994)
- As of 8 February 2016

The Papua New Guinea national under-19 cricket team represents the country of Papua New Guinea in Under-19 international cricket.

PNG has qualified for the Under-19 Cricket World Cup on eight occasions, the most for any associate team in the ICC East Asia-Pacific region. However, the team has only won three matches in World Cup history and has never made it past the first round.

== History ==
Papua New Guinea finished third in the 2009 ICC Under-19 Cricket World Cup Qualifier which was held in Canada. The team gained victories over the Under-19 teams of Hong Kong, Canada, Uganda, Sierra Leone, Vanuatu, the United States and the Netherlands. The team lost only two matches to Ireland and Afghanistan. Papua New Guinea's performance in this tournament gained them qualification for the 2010 ICC Under-19 Cricket World Cup.

At the 2020 Under-19 Cricket World Cup qualification EAP event, Papua New Guinea were undefeated going into the final game against Japan (also undefeated). However, they forfeited the match after Cricket PNG suspended eleven members of the squad due to breaching the team's code of conduct. The Papua New Guinea Cricket Board later suspended ten of the players for a year, for bringing the game into disrepute, following a shop-lifting incident.

== Under-19 World Cup record ==
Papua New Guinea's U19 World Cup record
Year	Result	Pos	№	Pld	W	L	T	NR
(Australia) 1988	Did not enter							
(South Africa) 1998	First round	16th	16	6	0	6	0	0
(Sri Lanka) 2000	Did not qualify							
(New Zealand) 2002	First round	16th	16	6	0	6	0	0
(Bangladesh) 2004	First round	16th	16	6	0	6	0	0
(Sri Lanka) 2006	Did not qualify							
(Malaysia) 2008	First round	12th	16	5	1	4	0	0
(New Zealand) 2010	First round	12th	16	6	1	5	0	0
(Australia) 2012	First round	14th	16	6	1	5	0	0
(United Arab Emirates) 2014	First round	16th	16	6	0	6	0	0
(Bangladesh) 2016	Did not qualify							
(New Zealand) 2018	First round	16th	16	6	0	6	0	0
(South Africa) 2020	Did not qualify							
(Cricket West Indies) 2022	First round	15th	16	5	0	5	0	0
(South Africa) 2024	Did not qualify							
(Zimbabwe) (Namibia) 2026	Did not qualify							
Total				52	3	49	0	0

== List of captains ==
Ten people have captained Papua New Guinea in under-19 One Day International (ODI) matches. Chris Amini, who captained the Papua New Guinea senior team in its inaugural ODI series in November 2014, is the only player to captain Papua New Guinea in both under-19 and regular ODIs.

No.	Name	First	Last	M	W	L	T	NR	Win%
1	Christian Alu	1998	1998	2	0	2	0	0	0.00
2	Kohu Dai	2002	2002	5	0	5	0	0	0.00
3	Clive Elly	2002	2002	1	0	1	0	0	0.00
4	Chris Amini	2004	2004	6	0	6	0	0	0.00
5	Colin Amini	2008	2008	5	1	4	0	0	20.00
6	Jason Kila	2010	2010	6	1	5	0	0	16.67
7	Christopher Kent	2012	2012	6	1	5	0	0	16.67
8	Dogodo Bau	2014	2014	6	0	6	0	0	0.00
9	Vagi Karaho	2018	2018	4	0	4	0	0	0.00
10	James Tau	2018	2018	2	0	2	0	0	0.00
11	Barnabas Maha	2022	2022	5	0	5	0	0	0.00

== Records ==
All records listed are for under-19 One Day International (ODI) matches only.

=== Team records ===
Highest totals

- 239/5 (50 overs), v. Afghanistan, at Allan Border Field, Brisbane, 19 August 2012
- 235 (50 overs), v. Zimbabwe, at WEP Harris Oval, Brisbane, 21 August 2012
- 222/6 (50 overs), v. England, at Lincoln Green, Lincoln, 23 January 2002
- 219 (44.2 overs), v. West Indies, at Sheikh Abu Naser Stadium, Khulna, 18 February 2004
- 211 (46.4 overs), v. Kenya, at Colin Maiden Park, Auckland, 31 January 2002

Lowest totals

- 50 (22.4 overs), v. Pakistan, at Queen's Park Oval, Trinidad, January 2022
- 53 (17.5 overs), v. Pakistan, at Bert Sutcliffe Oval, Lincoln, 20 January 2002
- 56 (28.2 overs), v. India, at Sharjah Cricket Stadium, Sharjah, 19 February 2014
- 59 (26 overs), v. West Indies, at Manzil Park, Klerksdorp, 14 January 1998
- 59 (24.5 overs), v. Australia, at Bert Sutcliffe Oval, Lincoln, 19 January 2018

=== Individual records ===
Most career runs

- 271 – Tony Ura (from 11 matches between 2008 and 2010, at an average of 27.10)
- 208 – Sese Bau (from 12 matches between 2010 and 2012, at an average of 18.90)
- 205 – Christopher Kent (from 6 matches in 2012, at an average of 41.00)
- 176 – Frank Joseph (from 6 matches in 2002, at an average of 29.33)
- 173 – Chris Amini (from 13 matches between 2008 and 2012, at an average of 13.30)

Highest individual scores

- 105* (117 balls) – Christopher Kent, v. Afghanistan, at Allan Border Field, Brisbane, 19 August 2012
- 92 (126 balls) – Frank Joseph, v. England, at Lincoln Green, Lincoln, 23 January 2002
- 84* (89 balls) – Assad Vala, v. West Indies, at Sheikh Abu Naser Stadium, Khulna, 18 February 2004
- 81 (117 balls) – Simon Atai, v. Canada, at Lincoln Green, Lincoln, 22 January 2018
- 76* (55 balls) – Tony Ura, v. Bermuda, at Johor Cricket Academy Oval, Johor, 25 February 2008

Most career wickets

- 23 – Raymond Haoda (from 12 matches between 2010 and 2012, at an average of 19.52)
- 13 – Alei Nao (from 8 matches between 2012 and 2014, at an average of 21.30)
- 13 – Kabua Morea (from 9 matches between 2012 and 2014, at an average of 24.76)
- 10 – James Tau (from 6 matches in 2018, at an average of 20.10)
- 9 – John Reva (from 7 matches between 2008 and 2010, at an average of 21.88)

Best bowling performances

- 5/16 (7.4 overs) – Toua Dai, v. Kenya, at St Stithians College, Johannesburg, 22 January 1998
- 5/19 (9 overs) – John Kariko, v. Uganda, at Diego Martin Sporting Complex, Diego Martin, 28 January 2022
- 5/32 (7.1 overs) – Chad Soper, v. India, at Endeavour Park, Townsville, 16 August 2012
- 5/34 (8.3 overs) – Raymond Haoda, v. Afghanistan, at Nelson Park, Napier, 24 January 2010
- 5/45 (7 overs) – Christopher Kent, v. Zimbabwe, at Endeavour Park, Townsville, 11 August 2012
