= Nitish Kumar (cricketer) =

American cricketer (born 1994)

Personal information
- Full name: Nitish Roenik Kumar
- Born: May 21, 1994 (age 32); Scarborough, Ontario, Canada
- Batting: Right-handed
- Bowling: Right-arm off break
- Role: Batsman

International information
- National sides: Canada (2010–2019); United States (2024)
- ODI debut (cap 69): 18 February 2010; Canada v Afghanistan
- Last ODI: January 28, 2014; Canada v Netherlands
- T20I debut (cap 33/36): March 13, 2012; Canada v Netherlands
- Last T20I: October 5, 2024; United States v Namibia

Domestic team information
- Years: Team
- 2015: Loughborough MCCU
- 2016: ICC Americas
- 2016–2017: St Lucia Zouks
- 2018: Toronto Nationals
- 2019: Brampton Wolves
- 2021: Leeward Islands
- 2023-present: Los Angeles Knight Riders

Career statistics
Competition	ODI	T20I	FC	LA
Matches	16	36	15	79
Runs scored	217	711	644	2,114
Batting average	15.50	25.39	29.27	28.18
100s/50s	0/0	0/4	2/2	4/11
Top score	38	83	141	129
Balls bowled	66	180	622	1,343
Wickets	2	8	11	29
Bowling average	31.50	23.00	48.63	38.93
5 wickets in innings	0	0	0	1
10 wickets in match	0	0	0	0
Best bowling	2/40	2/18	3/58	5/72
Catches/stumpings	7/–	15/–	5/–	32/–
- Source: ESPNcricinfo, November 5, 2024

Nitish Roenik Kumar (born May 21, 1994) is a Canadian-born American cricketer who currently plays for the United States national cricket team.

Kumar is a former captain of the Canada national cricket team. Kumar was appointed as the national men's team captain in October 2016 at the age of 22. He bats right-handed and bowls right-arm off spin. After representing the country at the 2010 Under-19 World Cup in January, Kumar made his One Day International debut the following month, becoming the second-youngest player in the history of ODIs. When Canada participated in the 2011 World Cup Kumar became the youngest player to feature in the tournament. He played his first Twenty20 International in March 2012, against the Netherlands. After last representing Canada in 2019, Kumar made his international debut for the United States national cricket team in April 2024.

== Career ==
On August 14, 2009 Nitish Kumar played in a match, debuting in the same match as teammate Jimmy Hansra. The match was part of the 2009–10 ICC Intercontinental Cup, and in the first innings against Kenya, Kumar made 12 runs before he was dismissed while in the second innings was out first ball. Kumar made his One Day International debut six months later in February 2010 against Afghanistan, becoming the second youngest ODI player. In January 2010, Kumar represented Canada in the 2010 Under-19 World Cup hosted by New Zealand. The team finished in 11th place out of 16 teams. Canada's participation in the 2009–10 ICC Intercontinental Cup concluded in September 2010, when they finished bottom of the seven-team group stage. Kumar played in four Cup matches, amassing 117 runs with a highest score of 74 against Afghanistan (the eventual Cup winners).

Canada qualified for the 2011 World Cup held between February and April in Bangladesh, India, and Sri Lanka. The 15-man squad included five players under the age of 21 (including Kumar), all of whom had played in the Under-19 World Cup the previous year. At the age of 16 years and 283 days, he became the youngest player ever to play in a World Cup when Canada lost to Zimbabwe on 28 February 2011. As expected Canada failed to progress beyond the group stages of the tournament, but secured a victory against Kenya, the only other non-Test team in their group. In July Ireland hosted the 2011 Under-19 World Cup Qualifier. Canada finished 8th out of ten teams, thereby failing to qualify for the tournament the following year. Kumar was Canada's leading run-scorer in the qualifying tournament, and 4th overall with 370 runs including two centuries from nine matches. His off-breaks also claimed eight scalps at an average of 22.87, making him Canada's 4th-highest wicket taker. Canada's first match of the 2011–13 ICC Intercontinental Cup took place in August 2011.

The World Twenty20 Qualifier was held in March 2012. During Canada's opening match against the Netherlands, Kumar was one of thirteen plays to make their debut in Twenty20 Internationals. He was run out for a single. His second match of the tournament was more successful, and he registered his highest score in twenty20 matches (it did not have T20I status) scoring 57 runs from 44 balls to help Canada to a 6-run victory over Papua New Guinea. With 172 runs from 9 matches, Kumar was Canada's second-highest run-scorer in the competition.

The 2013 matches of the 2011–13 ICC Intercontinental Cup offered Kumar further first-class experience, and he bettered his highest score in two consecutive matches. The first, against Kenya in March, saw Kumar score 89 which was the largest contribution to his team's score in the first innings, though Kenya went on to win the match. In August that year Kumar scored his maiden century, this time reaching 103 against the United Arab Emirates.

In January 2018, he was named as the captain of Canada's squad for the 2018 ICC World Cricket League Division Two tournament.

On June 3, 2018, he was selected to play for the Toronto Nationals in the players' draft for the inaugural edition of the Global T20 Canada tournament.

In September 2018, he was named as the captain of Canada's squad for the 2018–19 ICC World Twenty20 Americas Qualifier tournament. He was the leading wicket-taker for Canada in the tournament, with eleven dismissals in six matches.

In October 2018, he was named in Canada's squad for the 2018–19 Regional Super50 tournament in the West Indies. In April 2019, he was named in Canada's squad for the 2019 ICC World Cricket League Division Two tournament in Namibia.

In June 2019, he was selected to play for the Brampton Wolves franchise team in the 2019 Global T20 Canada tournament. In August 2019, he was named in Canada's squad for the Regional Finals of the 2018–19 ICC T20 World Cup Americas Qualifier tournament. In September 2019, he was named in Canada's squad for the 2019 Malaysia Cricket World Cup Challenge League A tournament. In October 2019, he was named in Canada's squad for the 2019 ICC T20 World Cup Qualifier tournament in the United Arab Emirates. Canada won their first three matches of the tournament, with Kumar named as the player of the match in all three fixtures, after scoring three consecutive fifties. He was the leading run-scorer for Canada in the tournament, with 245 runs in six matches. Following the T20 World Cup, he was named in Canada's squad for the 2019–20 Regional Super50 tournament in the West Indies. He was the leading run-scorer for Canada in the tournament, with 265 runs in eight matches.

In January 2021, ahead of the 2020–21 Regional Super50 in the West Indies, Kumar joined a training camp with the Leeward Islands cricket team. In June 2021, he was selected to take part in the Minor League Cricket tournament in the United States following the players' draft.
