= Canada national under-19 cricket team =

Cricket team

Canada Under-19s

Personnel
- Captain: Mihir Patel (2022)
- Coach: Farouk Kirmani (2022)
- Owner: Cricket Canada

Team information
- Colours: Red

The Canada national under-19 cricket team represents the country of Canada in under-19 international cricket.

Canada has qualified for the Under-19 Cricket World Cup on eight occasions, the most of any associate member from the ICC Americas region.

== History ==
Two Canadian players represented the ICC Associates XI at the inaugural 1988 Youth Cricket World Cup in Australia. Four Canadians represented the combined Americas XI at the 2000 Under-19 Cricket World Cup.

At the 2010 ICC Under-19 Cricket World Cup Canada finished in 11th position. They won two games in the competition, against Zimbabwe in the group stage and against Papua New Guinea in the play-off for 11th place. The victory against Zimbabwe is their only victory against a full member at the Under-19 World Cup.

The coach of Canada for the 2020 Under-19 Cricket World Cup in South Africa was Farouk Kirmani and the captain was Ashtan Deosammy.

Towards the end of the 2022 World Cup, the ICC confirmed that there were nine cases of COVID-19 within Canada's camp. Therefore, the team's remaining two matches were cancelled, with Scotland progressing to the 13th-place playoff match due to a superior net run rate. The Canadian team flew back home shortly after the ICC's statement.

== Under-19 World Cup record ==
Canada's U19 World Cup record
| Year | Result | Pos | № | Pld | W | L | T | NR |
|---|---|---|---|---|---|---|---|---|
| (Australia) 1988 | Part of ICC Associates XI | | | | | | | |
| (South Africa) 1998 | did not enter | | | | | | | |
| (Sri Lanka) 2000 | Part of ICC Americas XI | | | | | | | |
| (New Zealand) 2002 | First round | 15th | 16 | 6 | 0 | 5 | 1 | 0 |
| (Bangladesh) 2004 | First round | 15th | 16 | 6 | 0 | 6 | 0 | 0 |
| (Sri Lanka) 2006 | did not qualify | | | | | | | |
| (Malaysia) 2008 | did not qualify | | | | | | | |
| (New Zealand) 2010 | First round | 11th | 16 | 6 | 2 | 2 | 0 | 2 |
| (Australia) 2012 | did not qualify | | | | | | | |
| (United Arab Emirates) 2014 | First round | 15th | 16 | 6 | 1 | 5 | 0 | 0 |
| (Bangladesh) 2016 | First round | 15th | 16 | 6 | 1 | 5 | 0 | 0 |
| (New Zealand) 2018 | First round | 12th | 16 | 6 | 2 | 4 | 0 | 0 |
| (South Africa) 2020 | First round | 13th | 16 | 6 | 2 | 4 | 0 | 0 |
| (Cricket West Indies) 2022 | First round | 15th | 16 | 4 | 0 | 4 | 0 | 0 |
| (South Africa) 2024 | did not qualify | | | | | | | |
| Total | | | | 46 | 8 | 35 | 1 | 2 |

== List of captains ==
Eight players have captained Canada in under-19 One Day International (ODI) matches.

| № | Name | First | Last | M | W | L | T | NR | Win% |
|---|---|---|---|---|---|---|---|---|---|
| 1 | Ashish Bagai | 2002 | 2002 | 5 | 0 | 4 | 1 | 0 | 10.00 |
| 2 | Nathan Richards | 2002 | 2002 | 1 | 0 | 1 | 0 | 0 | 0.00 |
| 3 | Umar Bhatti | 2004 | 2004 | 6 | 0 | 6 | 0 | 0 | 0.00 |
| 4 | Rustam Bhatti | 2010 | 2010 | 5 | 2 | 2 | 0 | 1 | 50.00 |
| 5 | Nitish Kumar | 2014 | 2014 | 6 | 1 | 5 | 0 | 0 | 16.67 |
| 6 | Abraash Khan | 2016 | 2016 | 6 | 1 | 5 | 0 | 0 | 16.67 |
| 7 | Arslan Khan | 2018 | 2018 | 6 | 2 | 4 | 0 | 0 | 33.33 |
| 8 | Ashtan Deosammy | 2020 | 2020 | 5 | 2 | 3 | 0 | 0 | 40.00 |
| 9 | Mihir Patel | 2022 | 2022 | 4 | 0 | 4 | 0 | 0 | 0.00 |

== Records ==
All records listed are for under-19 One Day International (ODI) matches only.

=== Team records ===
Highest totals

- 300/7 (50 overs), v. Japan, at Ibbies Oval, Potchefstroom, 30 January 2020
- 265/8 (50 overs), v. Papua New Guinea, at Lincoln No. 3, Lincoln, 22 January 2018
- 248/8 (50 overs), v. South Africa, at Tolerance Oval, Abu Dhabi, 16 February 2014
- 240 (47.3 overs), v. Namibia, at ICC Academy No. 2, Dubai, 24 February 2014
- 235 (46.4 overs), v. United Arab Emirates, at Conaree Sports Club, Basseterre, 15 January 2022

Lowest totals

- 41 (28.4 overs), v. South Africa, at North Harbour Stadium, Auckland, 25 January 2002
- 75 (27.1 overs), v. Bangladesh, at Sheikh Zayed Stadium, Abu Dhabi, 22 February 2014
- 81 (31.1 overs), v. South Africa, at Shahid Kamruzzaman Stadium, Rajshahi, 17 February 2004
- 85 (34.4 overs), v. Namibia, at Colin Maiden Park No. 2, Auckland, 1 February 2002
- 85 (29.2 overs), v. Ireland, at Brian Lara Cricket Academy, Tarouba, 25 January 2022

=== Individual records ===
Most career runs

- 427 – Arslan Khan (2016-2018)
- 312 – Akash Gill (2016-2018)
- 259 – Mihir Patel (2020-2022)
- 219 – Nitish Kumar (2010-2014)
- 197 – Yug Rao (2014)

Highest individual scores

- 120 (115 balls) – Akash Gill, v. Papua New Guinea, at Lincoln No. 3, Lincoln, 22 January 2018
- 101 (102 balls) – Nicholas Manohar, v. Japan, at Ibbies Oval, Potchefstroom, 30 January 2020
- 96 (105 balls) – Mihir Patel, v. United Arab Emirates, at Conaree Sports Club, Basseterre, 15 January 2022
- 90 (105 balls) – Mihir Patel, v. United Arab Emirates, at Mangaung Oval, Bloemfontein, 18 January 2020
- 90 (114 balls) – Usman Limbada, v. Zimbabwe, at Village Green, Christchurch, 15 January 2010

Most career wickets

- 16 – Akhil Kumar (2020)
- 14 – Faisal Jamkhandi (2018)
- 13 – Akash Gill (2016-2018)
- 9 – Shaheed Keshvani (2004)
- 8 – Nikhil Dutta (2014), Miraj Patel (2016)

Best bowling performances

- 6/46 (10 overs) – Akhil Kumar, v. Japan, at Ibbies Oval, Potchefstroom, 30 January 2020
- 5/29 (10 overs) – Shaheed Keshvani, v. Bangladesh, at M. A. Aziz Stadium, Chittagong, 27 February 2004
- 5/48 (8 overs) – Faisal Jamkhandi, v. Afghanistan, at Bert Sutcliffe Oval, Lincoln, 15 January 2018
- 4/16 (4 overs) – Miraj Patel, v. Fiji, at Sheikh Kamal International Stadium, Cox's Bazar, 11 February 2016
- 4/43 (8 overs) – Akash Gill, v. Namibia, at Bert Sutcliffe Oval, Lincoln, 18 January 2018
