= Shaker Ahmed =

Bangladeshi cricketer (born 1992)

Personal information
- Full name: Shaker Ahmed
- Born: 23 May 1992 (age 34); Sylhet, Bangladesh
- Batting: Left-handed
- Bowling: Slow left arm orthodox
- Role: Bowler

Domestic team information
- Years: Team
- 2010/11-2013/14: Sylhet Division
- 2013/14: Victoria Sporting Club
- First-class debut: 4 October 2010 Sylhet Division v Rajshahi Division
- Last First-class: 12 April 2014 Sylhet Division v Rangpur Division
- List A debut: 23 October 2010 Sylhet Division v Barisal Division
- Last List A: 2 November 2013 Victoria Sporting Club v Sheikh Jamal Dhanmondi Club

Career statistics
Competition	FC	List A
Matches	17	6
Runs scored	403	38
Batting average	18.31	12.66
100s/50s	–/2	–/–
Top score	62	23
Balls bowled	2167	256
Wickets	45	6
Bowling average	25.64	29.16
5 wickets in innings	3	–
10 wickets in match	–	–
Best bowling	9/96	2/29
Catches/stumpings	16/–	1/–
- Source: Cricinfo, 30 October 2016

Shaker Ahmed (born 1992) is a Bangladeshi cricket player. He is a bowler and was included in 2010 in the national squad for the 2010 Under-19 World Cup in New Zealand.

Shaker left Bangladesh in 2014 and went to the US. He has started playing in many tournaments in the US. He captained Cricket Academy of Detroit in Michigan. In January 2021, USA Cricket named Ahmed in a 44-man squad to begin training in Texas ahead of the 2021 Oman Tri-Nation Series.
