= Dylan Higgins =

Zimbabwean cricketer (born 1991)

Personal information
- Full name: Dylan Robert Higgins
- Born: 5 April 1991 (age 35); Harare, Zimbabwe
- Batting: Right-handed
- Bowling: Legbreak
- Role: Bowler

Domestic team information
- Years: Team
- 2009/10: Mid West Rhinos
- 2009/10: Matabeleland Tuskers
- Source: ESPNcricinfo, 11 May 2025

Dylan Robert Higgins (born 5 April 1991) is a Zimbabwean cricketer who played first-class, List A, and Twenty20 matches for Matabeleland Tuskers and Mid West Rhinos during the 2009–10 season. His debut first-class match saw him take 11 wickets, with six wickets in the first innings and five in the second. He was later selected to captain Zimbabwe at the International Cricket Council under-19 World Cup in New Zealand.

Born in Harare, he disappeared from the Zimbabwe cricket scene in 2010 and moved to the UK to take Actuarial Exams.

In 2010 he and his brother Ryan were contracted to play for Potterne CC near Devizes and featured in a Radio 4 documentary about overseas players in club cricket ‘Australian wanted in Woodhall Spa’
