= Jason Kila =

Papua New Guinean cricketer

Personal information
- Full name: Jason Kila
- Born: 15 January 1990 (age 36); Port Moresby, Papua New Guinea
- Batting: Left-handed
- Bowling: Slow left-arm orthodox
- Role: Batting all-rounder

International information
- National side: Papua New Guinea
- ODI debut (cap 20): 4 March 2018 v United Arab Emirates
- Last ODI: 25 March 2022 v Nepal
- T20I debut (cap 24): 22 March 2019 v Philippines
- Last T20I: 29 March 2022 v Malaysia

Career statistics
Competition	ODI	LA	T20
Matches	13	25	23
Runs scored	159	317	109
Batting average	15.90	15.09	15.57
100s/50s	0/0	0/0	0/0
Top score	36	36*	27*
Balls bowled	229	397	186
Wickets	6	8	6
Bowling average	33.33	41.50	32.83
5 wickets in innings	0	0	0
10 wickets in match	0	0	0
Best bowling	3/27	3/27	1/5
Catches/stumpings	3/–	7/–	7/–
Medal record
Representing Papua New Guinea
Men's Cricket
Pacific Games
Silver medal – second place	2015 Port Moresby	20 over cricket
- Source: Cricinfo, 18 April 2022

Jason Kila (born 15 January 1990) is a Papua New Guinean cricketer. Kila is a left-handed batsman who bowls slow left-arm orthodox. He was born in Port Moresby.

Having played age group cricket for Papua New Guinea Under-19s in the 2008 Under-19 World Cup and 2010 Under-19 World Cup, he was selected for the Papua New Guinea squad for the 2011 World Cricket League Division Three, where he played 5 matches, helping them earn promotion to 2011 World Cricket League Division Two. It was in this competition that he made his List A debut against Namibia. He played a further 3 List A matches in the competition, the last coming against Hong Kong. In his 4 matches, he scored 75 runs at a batting average of 18.75, with a high score 36. With the ball, he took a single wickets at an overall competition cost of 57 runs.

== International career ==
He made his One Day International (ODI) debut against the United Arab Emirates in the 2018 Cricket World Cup Qualifier on 4 March 2018. In August 2018, he was named in Papua New Guinea's squad for Group A of the 2018–19 ICC World Twenty20 East Asia-Pacific Qualifier tournament.

In March 2019, he was named in Papua New Guinea's squad for the Regional Finals of the 2018–19 ICC World Twenty20 East Asia-Pacific Qualifier tournament. He made his Twenty20 International (T20I) debut for Papua New Guinea against the Philippines on 22 March 2019. The following month, he was named in Papua New Guinea's squad for the 2019 ICC World Cricket League Division Two tournament in Namibia.

In September 2019, he was named in Papua New Guinea's squad for the 2019 ICC T20 World Cup Qualifier tournament in the United Arab Emirates. In August 2021, Kila was named in Papua New Guinea's squad for the 2021 ICC Men's T20 World Cup.
