= Tariq Mahmood (cricketer) =

Pakistani cricketer (born 1985)

Personal information
- Born: 22 April 1985 (age 41); Gujranwala, Punjab, Pakistan
- Source: Cricinfo, 28 March 2021

Tariq Mahmood (born 22 April 1985) is a Pakistani cricketer. He played in twenty first-class and eleven List A matches between 2001 and 2010. He made his Twenty20 debut on 27 April 2005, for Sialkot Stallions in the 2004–05 National Twenty20 Cup.
