= Raymond Haoda =

Papua New Guinean cricketer (born 1991)

Personal information
- Full name: Raymond Charles Haoda
- Born: 15 December 1991 (age 34); Port Moresby, Papua New Guinea
- Batting: Right-handed
- Bowling: Right-arm medium-fast

International information
- National side: Papua New Guinea

Career statistics
Competition	List A
Matches	4
Runs scored	0
Batting average	–
100s/50s	–/–
Top score	0*
Balls bowled	156
Wickets	10
Bowling average	15.60
5 wickets in innings	–
10 wickets in match	–
Best bowling	4/50
Catches/stumpings	2/–
- Source: Cricinfo, 13 January 2014

Raymond Charles Haoda (born 15 December 1991) is a Papua New Guinean cricketer. Haoda is a right-handed batsman who bowls right-arm medium-fast. He was born in Port Moresby.

Having played age group cricket for Papua New Guinea Under-19s in the 2010 Under-19 World Cup, in which he emerged as the leading wicket taker with 15, he was selected in the Papua New Guinea squad for the 2011 World Cricket League Division Three, but did not play a match. His World Cricket League debut for Papua New Guinea came in the 2011 World Cricket League Division Two. It was in this tournament that he made his List A debut against Namibia. He played a further 2 List A matches in the competition, both against Hong Kong. In his 3 matches, he took 6 wickets at a bowling average of 17.66, with best figures of 3/40.
