= New Zealand national under-19 cricket team =

New Zealand
- Association: New Zealand Cricket

Personnel
- Captain: Tom Jones (2026 World Cup)
- Coach: Paul Wiseman

Team information
- Colours: Black
- Founded: 1986 (first Test)

International Cricket Council
- ICC region: East Asia-Pacific
- Official website: Official Website
Test kit
ODI kit
T20I kit
- As of 18 December 2023

The New Zealand Under-19 cricket team have been playing official Under-19 test matches since 1986. Former captains of the team include Stephen Fleming, Craig McMillan, Chris Cairns, Brendon McCullum, and Ross Taylor

New Zealand's coach for the 2020 Under-19 Cricket World Cup is Paul Wiseman. Previous coaches have included Robert Carter (appointed 2014) and Mark Greatbatch (appointed 2001).

New Zealand's best World Cup result occurred at the 1998 event in South Africa, where they lost to England in the final by seven wickets.

== Tournament history ==
A red box around the year indicates tournaments played within New Zealand

Key
| Champions |
| Runners-up |
| Semi-finals |

=== Under-19 World Cup record ===
New Zealand's U19 World Cup record
| Year | Result | Pos | № | Pld | W | L | T | NR |
|---|---|---|---|---|---|---|---|---|
| (Australia) 1988 | First round | 7th | 8 | 7 | 2 | 5 | 0 | 0 |
| (South Africa) 1998 | Runners Up | 2nd | 16 | 7 | 4 | 3 | 0 | 0 |
| (Sri Lanka) 2000 | Second round | 7th | 16 | 6 | 1 | 4 | 0 | 1 |
| (New Zealand) 2002 | Second round | 6th | 16 | 6 | 3 | 2 | 0 | 1 |
| (Bangladesh) 2004 | Second round | 8th | 16 | 6 | 2 | 4 | 0 | 0 |
| (Sri Lanka) 2006 | First round | 10th | 16 | 6 | 3 | 3 | 0 | 0 |
| (Malaysia) 2008 | Semi-finals | 4th | 16 | 6 | 3 | 3 | 0 | 0 |
| (New Zealand) 2010 | Second round | 7th | 16 | 6 | 4 | 2 | 0 | 0 |
| (Australia) 2012 | Semi-finals | 4th | 16 | 6 | 3 | 3 | 0 | 0 |
| (United Arab Emirates) 2014 | First round | 10th | 16 | 6 | 3 | 3 | 0 | 0 |
| (Bangladesh) 2016 | First round | 12th | 16 | 6 | 2 | 4 | 0 | 0 |
| (New Zealand) 2018 | Second round | 8th | 16 | 6 | 3 | 3 | 0 | 0 |
| (South Africa) 2020 | Semi-finals | 4th | 16 | 6 | 2 | 2 | 0 | 2 |
| (Cricket West Indies) 2022 | Withdrew due to COVID-19 pandemic | | | | | | | |
| (South Africa) 2024 | Second round | 10th | 16 | 5 | 2 | 3 | 0 | 0 |
| (Zimbabwe) (Namibia) 2026 | Second round | 9th | 16 | 5 | 0 | 3 | 0 | 2 |
| Total | | | | 90 | 37 | 47 | 0 | 6 |
