= Rustam Bhatti =

Canadian cricketer (born 1990)

Personal information
- Born: 18 February 1990 (age 36); Lahore, Pakistan
- Batting: Right-handed
- Bowling: Right-arm off-break

International information
- National side: Canada (2011-2012)
- Only ODI (cap 76): 9 August 2011 v Afghanistan
- T20I debut (cap 29): 13 March 2012 v Netherlands
- Last T20I: 23 November 2012 v Scotland
- Source: Cricinfo, 30 April 2023

Rustam Bhatti (born February 18, 1990, in Lahore, Punjab, Pakistan) is a Canadian cricketer of Pakistani origin who represents the Canada national cricket team. He is a right hand batsman who has also captained the Canada U-19 cricket team.

Bhatti scored 175 runs during the U-19 World Cup Qualifiers, including one half-century, and has gained first-class cricket experience while playing for Canada in the ICC Intercontinental Cup.
