= Australia national under-19 cricket team =

Australian cricket team

Australia
- Association: Cricket Australia

Personnel
- Captain: Hugh Weibgen
- Coach: Anthony Clark
- Fielding coach: Peter Siddle
- Manager: Geoffrey Tamblyn

Team information
- Colors: Yellow and Green
- Founded: 1978; 48 years ago
- Home ground: Melbourne Cricket Ground

History
- First-class debut: England in 1979 at Melbourne Cricket Ground
- ICC Under-19 Cricket World Cup wins: (gold) 4 (1988, 2002, 2010, 2024)

International Cricket Council
- ICC region: East Asia-Pacific
Test kit
ODI kit
T20I kit
- As of 18 December 2023

The Australian Under-19 cricket team have been playing official Under-19 test matches since 1978. Former captains include Stuart Law, Damien Martyn, Brad Haddin, Nathan Hauritz and Cameron White who have all gone on to play international cricket for Australia. They have won the Under-19 Cricket World Cup on four occasions, in 1988, 2002, 2010 and 2024, the second-most behind India.

== Under-19 World Cup record ==
Australia's U19 World Cup record
| Year | Result | Pos | № | Pld | W | L | T | NR |
|---|---|---|---|---|---|---|---|---|
| (Australia) 1988 | Champions | 1st | 8 | 9 | 8 | 1 | 0 | 0 |
| (South Africa) 1998 | Second round | 4th | 16 | 6 | 5 | 1 | 0 | 0 |
| (Sri Lanka) 2000 | Semi-finals | 4th | 16 | 7 | 4 | 3 | 0 | 0 |
| (New Zealand) 2002 | Champions | 1st | 16 | 8 | 8 | 0 | 0 | 0 |
| (Bangladesh) 2004 | First round | 10th | 16 | 8 | 6 | 2 | 0 | 0 |
| (Sri Lanka) 2006 | Semi-finals | 3rd | 16 | 5 | 4 | 1 | 0 | 0 |
| (Malaysia) 2008 | Second round | 6th | 16 | 6 | 2 | 2 | 0 | 2 |
| (New Zealand) 2010 | Champions | 1st | 16 | 6 | 5 | 1 | 0 | 0 |
| (Australia) 2012 | Runner-up | 2nd | 16 | 6 | 5 | 1 | 0 | 0 |
| (United Arab Emirates) 2014 | Semi-finals | 4th | 16 | 6 | 3 | 3 | 0 | 0 |
| (Bangladesh) 2016 | Withdrew | | | | | | | |
| (New Zealand) 2018 | Runner-up | 2nd | 16 | 6 | 4 | 2 | 0 | 0 |
| (South Africa) 2020 | Quarter finals | 6th | 16 | 6 | 3 | 2 | 0 | 1 |
| (Cricket West Indies) 2022 | Semi-finals | 3rd | 16 | 6 | 4 | 2 | 0 | 0 |
| (South Africa) 2024 | Champions | 1st | 16 | 8 | 7 | 0 | 0 | 1 |
| (Zimbabwe) (Namibia) 2026 | Semi-finals | 3rd | 16 | 6 | 5 | 1 | 0 | 0 |

== Current squad ==
The Australian squad that was selected for the 2024 ICC Under-19 Cricket World Cup is as follows:

- Hugh Weibgen - Captain (QLD - Valley District Cricket Club)
- Lachlan Aitken (QLD - Gold Coast District Cricket Club)
- Charlie Anderson (NSW - Northern District Cricket Club)
- Harkirat Bajwa (VIC - Melbourne Cricket Club)
- Mahli Beardman (WA - Melville Cricket Club)
- Tom Campbell (QLD - Western Suburbs District Cricket Club)
- Harry Dixon (VIC - St Kilda Cricket Club)
- Ryan Hicks (NSW - Mosman Cricket Club)
- Sam Konstas (NSW - Sutherland Cricket Club)
- Rafael MacMillan (NSW - St George District Cricket Club)
- Aidan O’Connor (TAS - Greater Northern Raiders)
- Harjas Singh (NSW - Western Suburbs Cricket Club)
- Tom Straker (NSW - Sutherland District Cricket Club)
- Callum Vidler (QLD - Valley District Cricket Club)
- Corey Wasley (WA - Rockingham-Mandurah Cricket Club)

Non-travelling reserve players

- Xander Buxton (VIC - Melbourne Cricket Club)
- Cameron Frendo (NSW - Fairfield Liverpool Cricket Club)
- Ollie Peake (VIC - Geelong Cricket Club)
- Cody Reynolds (QLD - Gold Coast District Cricket Club)
