= Shaheed Keshvani =

Canadian cricketer (born 1984)

Personal information
- Born: 23 May 1984 (age 42); Canada

International information
- National side: Canada (2009-2010)
- ODI debut (cap 64): 7 July 2009 v Scotland
- Last ODI: 22 August 2009 v Kenya
- T20I debut (cap 23): 3 February 2010 v Ireland
- Last T20I: 4 February 2010 v Afghanistan
- Source: Cricinfo, 29 April 2020

Shaheed Keshvani (born 23 May 1984) is a Canadian cricketer. He has played five One Day Internationals (ODIs) and two Twenty20 Internationals for Canada. He plays as a middle-order batsman, and bats right-handed.

Keshvani made his ODI debut on 7 July 2009, against Scotland.
