= Hiral Patel =

Indian-born international cricketer (born 1991)

Hira Patel
Personal information
- Full name: Hiral Patel
- Born: 10 August 1991 (age 35); Ahmedabad, Gujarat, India
- Batting: Left-handed
- Bowling: Slow left-arm orthodox
- Role: Batsman

International information
- National side: Canada (2009–2013)
- ODI debut (cap 66): 19 August 2009 v Kenya
- Last ODI: 29 August 2013 v Netherlands
- T20I debut (cap 25): 3 February 2010 v Ireland
- Last T20I: 11 November 2021 v Bermuda

Career statistics
Competition	ODI	T20I	FC	LA
Matches	23	11	8	28
Runs scored	468	220	93	572
Batting average	21.27	22.00	20.26	21.18
100s/50s	0/2	0/1	0/1	0/3
Top score	62	88*	93	62
Balls bowled	409	59	348	571
Wickets	10	2	7	12
Bowling average	35.30	41.50	33.71	21.18
5 wickets in innings	0	0	0	0
10 wickets in match	0	0	0	0
Best bowling	4/28	2/23	4/41	4/28
Catches/stumpings	7/–	3/–	4/–	9/–
- Source: ESPNcricinfo, 15 November 2021

Hiral Patel (born 10 August 1991) is an Indian-born international cricketer who plays for Canada. He is a left-handed batsman and slow left-arm orthodox bowler.

== Career ==
Patel played his debut first-class match against Afghanistan on 20 February 2010, scoring 55 runs taking a wicket off his 13 overs.

Patel made his ODI debut against Kenya on 19 August 2009 and his T20I debut against Ireland on 3 February 2010.

Patel was included in Canada's squad for the 2015 ICC World Twenty20 Qualifier tournament in July 2015, after Nikhil Dutta chose to stay with the St Kitts and Nevis Patriots in the Caribbean Premier League.

On 3 June 2018, he was selected to play for the Winnipeg Hawks in the players' draft for the inaugural edition of the Global T20 Canada tournament. In April 2019, he was named in Canada's squad for the 2019 ICC World Cricket League Division Two tournament in Namibia. In October 2021, he was named in Canada's Twenty20 International (T20I) squad for the 2021 ICC Men's T20 World Cup Americas Qualifier tournament in Antigua.
