= South Africa national under-19 cricket team =

Cricket team

South Africa Under-19s
- Association: Cricket South Africa

Personnel
- Captain: Matthew Montgomery
- Coach: Laurence Mahatlane
- Chief executive: Haroon Lorgat

Team information
- Founded: 1995
- Home ground: LC de Villiers Oval
- Capacity: 2,000

History
- First-class debut: England in 1995 at County Ground, Taunton, Somerset
- U19 Cricket World Cup wins: (gold) (2014)

International Cricket Council
- ICC region: Africa
Test kit
ODI kit
T20I kit
- As of 18 December 2023

The South African Under-19 cricket team have been playing official Under-19 test matches since 1995. International players to have represented the team include Wayne Parnell, Neil McKenzie, AB de Villiers, Mark Boucher, Makhaya Ntini, Kagiso Rabada, Andile Phehlukwayo and Aiden Markram, all of whom went on to play for South Africa. They won the Under-19 Cricket World Cup in 2014 and finished runner-up in both 2002 and 2008.

In February 2021, Cricket South Africa (CSA) announced that the team would take part in South Africa's Provincial first-class and List A cricket tournaments, starting with the 2020–21 CSA 3-Day Provincial Cup and the 2020–21 CSA Provincial One-Day Challenge respectively. However, the matches played by the under-19 team in those tournaments did not have first-class or List A status.

== Tournament History ==
A red box around the year indicates tournaments played within South Africa

Key
Champions
Runners-up
Semi-finals

=== ICC Under-19 Cricket World Cup ===
South Africa's U19 World Cup record
Year	Result	Pos	№	Pld	W	L	T	NR
(Australia) 1988	Ineligible – not an ICC member							
(South Africa) 1998	Semi-finals	3rd	16	6	5	1	0	0
(Sri Lanka) 2000	First round	9th	16	8	5	0	0	3
(New Zealand) 2002	Runner-up	2nd	16	8	5	3	0	0
(Bangladesh) 2004	Second round	7th	16	6	3	3	0	0
(Sri Lanka) 2006	First round	11th	16	5	2	3	0	0
(Malaysia) 2008	Runner-up	2nd	16	6	4	2	0	0
(New Zealand) 2010	Quarter-finals	7th	16	6	5	1	0	0
(Australia) 2012	Semi-finals	3rd	16	6	5	1	0	0
(United Arab Emirates) 2014	Champions	1st	16	6	6	0	0	0
(Bangladesh) 2016	First round	11th	16	6	3	3	0	0
(New Zealand) 2018	Quarter-finals	5th	16	6	4	2	0	0
(South Africa) 2020	Quarter-finals	8th	16	6	3	3	0	0
(Cricket West Indies) 2022	Playoff semifinals	7th	16	6	3	3	0	0
(South Africa) 2024	Semifinals	3rd	16	8	5	3	0	0
Total	1 title			81	56	25	0	3

== Honours ==
=== ICC ===
- U19 Cricket World Cup
  - Champions (1): 2014
  - Runners-up (2): 2002, 2008

== Current squad ==
The South African squad for the 2016 Under-19 Cricket World Cup, as announced on 21 December 2015, was as follows:

Player	Date of birth	Batting	Bowling style
Fraser Jones	14 June 2000 (aged 17)	Right	Right- arm fast
Tony de Zorzi (c)	28 August 1997 (aged 18)	Left	Right-arm off spin
Ziyaad Abrahams	27 March 1997 (aged 18)	Right	Right-arm fast
Dean Foxcroft	20 April 1998 (aged 17)	Right	Right-arm off spin
Dayyaan Galiem	2 January 1997 (aged 19)	Right	Right-arm medium-fast
Willem Ludick	20 March 1997 (aged 18)	Right	Right-arm medium
Wandile Makwetu (wk)	7 January 1999 (aged 17)	Right	—
Conor McKerr	19 January 1998 (aged 18)	Right	Right-arm fast
Rivaldo Moonsamy	13 September 1996 (aged 19)	Right	—
Wiaan Mulder	19 February 1998 (aged 17)	Right	Right-arm medium
Luke Philander	30 April 1997 (aged 18)	Right	Right-arm off spin
Farhaan Sayanvala	8 July 1997 (aged 18)	Right	Right-arm off spin
Lutho Sipamla	12 May 1998 (aged 17)	Right	Right-arm fast
Liam Smith	11 May 1997 (aged 18)	Right	—
Kyle Verreynne (wk)	12 May 1997 (aged 18)	Right	Right-arm off spin
Sean Whitehad	7 March 1997 (aged 18)	Right	Left-arm orthodox

== Controversy ==
In January 2024, David Teeger, The team's Jewish captain had been removed from captaincy by Cricket South Africa. Cricket South Africa stated that protests related to the Gaza war in the 2024 Under-19 Cricket World Cup, which hosted by South Africa, are likely to focus on Teeger, who had shown his support to Israel before. The decision caused outrage from the South African Jewish Board of Deputies and accused Cricket South Africa of Antisemitism.
