= Usman Limbada =

Canadian cricketer

Personal information
- Full name: Usman Limbada
- Born: 2 October 1989 (age 37); Scarborough, Ontario, Canada
- Batting: Right-handed
- Bowling: Right-arm medium
- Role: Batsman

International information
- National side: Canada (2010–2014)
- ODI debut (cap 68): 16 February 2010 v Afghanistan
- Last ODI: 28 January 2014 v Netherlands
- T20I debut (cap 26): 3 February 2010 v Ireland
- Last T20I: 26 November 2013 v Kenya

Career statistics
Competition	ODI	T20I	FC	LA
Matches	11	7	2	19
Runs scored	189	53	42	337
Batting average	18.90	53.00	10.50	19.82
100s/50s	0/1	0/0	0/0	0/2
Top score	50	21*	21	58
Catches/stumpings	4/–	1/–	1/–	8/–
- Source: ESPN Crickinfo, 16 March 2014

Usman Limbada (born 1 October 1989) is a cricketer who plays for Canada. He bats right-handed and bowls right-arm medium.

== Career ==
Usman played his maiden first-class match against a Zimbabwe XI on 2 August 2010, scoring five runs. He made his One Day International debut against Afghanistan on 16 February 2010 and his Twenty20 International debut in the same month against Ireland.

He was the top-scorer for Canada at the 2010 Under-19 World Cup Qualifiers, where he also scored one century.
