= 2015 Under-19 Cricket World Cup Qualifier =

2015 ICC Under-19 Cricket World Cup Qualifier
- Dates: 14 – 22 October 2015
- Administrator: International Cricket Council
- Cricket format: 50-over
- Tournament format(s): Round-robin, playoffs
- Host: Malaysia
- Champions: Nepal (1st title)
- Participants: 5
- Matches: 12
- Player of the series: (Nepal) Aarif Sheikh
- Most runs: (Nepal) Sunil Dhamala (170)
- Most wickets: (Ireland) Rory Anders (13)

The 2015 ICC Under-19 World Cup Qualifier was an international cricket tournament played in Malaysia from 14 to 22 October 2015, forming part of the 2015–16 international season. The tournament was originally going to be held in Nepal, but was moved to Malaysia due to the April 2015 earthquake. Nepal defeated Ireland in the tournament final to qualify for the 2016 Under-19 World Cup in Bangladesh. In January 2016, Australia withdrew their team from the World Cup and Ireland, as runners-up in the qualifier, replaced them.

== Teams ==
The second-placed teams at each of the five regional qualifying tournaments progressed to the qualifier:

- Nepal – runner-up in 2014 ACC Under-19 Premier League
- Papua New Guinea – runner-up in 2015 EAP Under-19 Cricket Trophy
- Uganda – runner-up in 2015 ICC Africa Under-19 Championship Division One
- United States – runner-up in 2015 ICC Americas Under-19 Championship
- Ireland – runner-up in 2015 ICC Europe Under-19 Championship

== Squads ==
Ireland Coach: Ryan Eagleson	Nepal Coach: Jagat Tamata	PNG Coach: John Ovia	Uganda Coach: Henry Okecho	United States Coach: Thiru Kumaran
Jack Tector (c); Rory Anders; Andrew Austin; Varun Chopra; Sonny Cott; Adam Dennison; Aaron Gillespie; Josh Little; Gary McClintock; William McClintock; James Mitchell; Tom Stanton; Lorcan Tucker; Ben White	Raju Rijal (c); Dipendra Airee; Sunil Dhamala; Saurabh Khanal; Lalit Rajbanshi; Deepesh Shrestha; Aarif Sheikh; Rajbir Singh	Lou Toua (c); Sinaka Arua; Ovia Boge; Jack Dairi; Arua Gau; Doura Gavera; Harry Gavera; Lohia Guba; Vagi Guba; Vagi John; Vagi Karoho; Vagi Kora; Sere Sam; Ako Toua	Derrick Bakunzi (c); Brian Adriko; Frank Akankwasa; Zephania Arinaitwe; Trevor Bukenya; Joseph Byaruhanga; John Gabula; Abdalah Lubega; Simon Okecho; Collines Okwalinga; Ashiraf Senkubuge; David Wabwire; Steven Wabwose; Kenneth Waiswa	Alexander Shoff (c); Anup Rao; Arjun Patel; Srihari Dasarathy; Kushal Ganji; Gauranshu Sharma; Mohak Buch; Gaurav Patanker; Keifer Phill; Sagar Patel; Sahil Patel; Anirudh Srinivas; Tohidul Islam; Vivek Narayan

== Round-robin ==
Team	Pld	W	L	T	NR	Pts	NRR
Nepal	4	4	0	0	0	8	+2.898
Ireland	4	3	1	0	0	6	+2.059
United States	4	2	2	0	0	4	–1.054
Uganda	4	1	3	0	0	2	–1.365
Papua New Guinea	4	0	4	0	0	0	–2.761

15 October
9:30
Scorecard

PNG; 48 (28.2 overs)	v	Nepal; 50/1 (9.1 overs)

Nepal won by 9 wickets
Kinrara Oval, Bandar Kinrara
Player of the match: Sunil Dhamala (Nep)

- Nepal won the toss and elected to field.

15 October
9:30
Scorecard

Uganda; 167 (45.2 overs)	v	United States; 168/4 (40.2 overs)

United States won by 6 wickets
Bayuemas Oval, Pandamaran
Player of the match: Sagar Patel (US)

- Uganda won the toss and elected to bat.

16 October
9:30
Scorecard

Ireland; 271 (48.0 overs)	v	PNG; 160 (36.4 overs)

Ireland won by 111 runs
Kinrara Oval, Bandar Kinrara
Player of the match: Adam Dennison (Ire)

- PNG won the toss and elected to field.

16 October
9:30
Scorecard

Nepal; 242/7 (50 overs)	v	Uganda; 71 (36.2 overs)

Nepal won by 171 runs
Bayuemas Oval, Pandamaran
Player of the match: Raju Rijal (Nep)

- Nepal won the toss and elected to bat.

18 October
9:30
Scorecard

PNG; 83 (30.4 overs)	v	Uganda; 84/1 (13.2 overs)

Uganda won by 9 wickets
Kinrara Oval, Bandar Kinrara
Player of the match: Frank Akankwasa (Uga)

- PNG won the toss and elected to bat.

18 October
9:30
Scorecard

United States; 100 (39.3 overs)	v	Ireland; 101/2 (15.4 overs)

Ireland won by 8 wickets
Bayuemas Oval, Pandamaran

- United States won the toss and elected to bat.

19 October
9:30
Scorecard

United States; 109/10 (46 overs)	v	Nepal; 114/4 (17.5 overs)

Nepal won by 6 wickets (D/L)
Kinrara Oval, Bandar Kinrara
Player of the match: Prem Tamang (Nep)

- Nepal won the toss and elected to field.
- The match was reduced to 48 overs per side.

19 October
9:30
Scorecard

Ireland; 255/8 (50 overs)	v	Uganda; 97 (23.5 overs)

Ireland won by 158 runs
Bayuemas Oval, Pandamaran
Player of the match: Lorcan Tucker (Ire)

- Uganda won the toss and elected to field.

21 October
9:30
Scorecard

Ireland; 184/7 (50 overs)	v	Nepal; 190/2 (42.5 overs)

Nepal won by 8 wickets
Kinrara Oval, Bandar Kinrara
Player of the match: Sandeep Sunar (Nep)

- Ireland won the toss and elected to bat.

21 October
9:30
Scorecard

PNG; 160 (41.3 overs)	v	United States; 161/5 (40.2 overs)

United States won by 5 wickets
Bayuemas Oval, Pandamaran
Player of the match: Tohidul Islam (US)

- United States won the toss and elected to field.

== Finals ==
=== Third-place playoff ===
22 October
9:30
Scorecard

Uganda; 130 (40.2 overs)	v	United States; 131/5 (47.2 overs)

United States won by 5 wickets
Bayuemas Oval, Pandamaran
Player of the match: Alex Shoff (US)

- United States won the toss and elected to field.

=== Final ===
22 October
9:30
Scorecard

Ireland; 184 (47.4 overs)	v	Nepal; 185/7 (46.2 overs)

Nepal won by 3 wickets
Kinrara Oval, Bandar Kinrara
Player of the match: Lalit Rajbanshi (Nep)

- Ireland won the toss and elected to bat.

== Statistics ==
=== Most runs ===
The top five run scorers (total runs) are included in this table.

Player	Team	Runs	Inns	Avg	S/R	Highest	100s	50s
Sunil Dhamala	Nepal	170	5	42.50	65.38	75	0	1
Sagar Patel	United States	168	5	42.00	49.12	66*	0	1
Lorcan Tucker	Ireland	167	4	41.75	84.34	90	0	1
Raju Rijal	Nepal	158	4	52.66	83.15	101	1	0
Aaron Gillespie	Ireland	152	4	50.66	72.72	58*	0	1

Source: ESPNcricinfo

=== Most wickets ===
The top five wicket takers are listed in this table, listed by wickets taken and then by bowling average.

Player	Team	Overs	Wkts	Ave	SR	Econ	BBI
Rory Anders	Ireland	41.3	13	10.00	19.1	3.13	4/29
Prem Tamang	Nepal	33.0	11	11.27	18.0	3.75	5/31
Aarif Sheikh	Nepal	41.4	10	7.10	25.0	1.70	3/7
Mohak Buch	United States	20.3	8	8.87	15.3	3.46	3/26
Derrick Bakunzi	Uganda	41.0	8	17.00	30.7	3.31	3/54

Source: ESPNcricinfo

== Final standings ==
Rank	Team	Qualification
1	Nepal	Advanced to 2016 U19 World Cup
2	Ireland	invited as Australia's replacement
3	United States	
4	Uganda	
5	Papua New Guinea	
