= International cricket in 2015–16 =

International cricket season

The 2015–2016 international cricket season was from October 2015 to April 2016.

== Season overview ==
Men's international tours
Start date	Home team	Away team	Results [Matches]				
Start date	Home team	Away team	Test	ODI	T20I	FC	LA
2 October 2015	India	South Africa	3–0 [4]	2–3 [5]	0–2 [3]	—	—
9 October 2015	Zimbabwe	Ireland	—	2–1 [3]	—	—	—
13 October 2015	(United Arab Emirates) Pakistan	England	2–0 [3]	1–3 [4]	0–3 [3]	—	—
14 October 2015	Sri Lanka	West Indies	2–0 [2]	3–0 [3]	1–1 [2]	—	—
16 October 2015	Zimbabwe	Afghanistan	—	2–3 [5]	0–2 [2]	—	—
24 October 2015	Namibia	Ireland	—	—	—	0–1 [1]	—
30 October 2015	Namibia	Kenya	—	—	—	—	0–2 [2]
5 November 2015	Australia	New Zealand	2–0 [3]	—	—	—	—
5 November 2015	Bangladesh	Zimbabwe	—	3–0 [3]	1–1 [2]	—	—
11 November 2015	UAE	Hong Kong	—	0–2 [2]	—	0–1 [1]	—
16 November 2015	(United Arab Emirates) Nepal	PNG	—	—	—	—	0–2 [2]
21 November 2015	(United Arab Emirates) Afghanistan	PNG	—	—	—	1–0 [1]	—
21 November 2015	(United Arab Emirates) Hong Kong	Oman	—	—	1–2 [3]	—	—
22 November 2015	UAE	Oman	—	—	1–0 [1]	—	—
28 November 2015	(United Arab Emirates) Afghanistan	Hong Kong	—	—	0–1 [1]	—	—
29 November 2015	(United Arab Emirates) Afghanistan	Oman	—	—	2–0 [2]	—	—
10 December 2015	Australia	West Indies	2–0 [3]	—	—	—	—
10 December 2015	New Zealand	Sri Lanka	2–0 [2]	3–1 [5]	2–0 [2]	—	—
25 December 2015	(United Arab Emirates) Afghanistan	Zimbabwe	—	3–2 [5]	2–0 [2]	—	—
26 December 2015	South Africa	England	1–2 [4]	3–2 [5]	2–0 [2]	—	—
12 January 2016	Australia	India	—	4–1 [5]	0–3 [3]	—	—
15 January 2016	New Zealand	Pakistan	—	2–0 [3]	2–1 [3]	—	—
15 January 2016	Bangladesh	Zimbabwe	—	—	2–2 [4]	—	—
21 January 2016	Hong Kong	Scotland	—	1–0 [2]	1–1 [2]	0–0 [1]	—
21 January 2016	UAE	Netherlands	—	—	0–1 [1]	0–1 [1]	0–2 [2]
31 January 2016	(Australia) PNG	Ireland	—	—	1–2 [3]	0–1 [1]	—
3 February 2016	New Zealand	Australia	0–2 [2]	2–1 [3]	—	—	—
4 February 2016	UAE	Scotland	—	—	1–0 [1]	—	—
5 February 2016	(United Arab Emirates) Netherlands	Scotland	—	—	0–1 [1]	—	—
9 February 2016	India	Sri Lanka	—	—	2–1 [3]	—	—
14 February 2016	UAE	Ireland	—	—	1–1 [2]	—	—
4 March 2016	South Africa	Australia	—	—	1–2 [3]	—	—
10 April 2016	(India) Afghanistan	Namibia	—	—	—	1–0 [1]	—
16 April 2016	Nepal	Namibia	—	—	—	—	2–0 [2]
Men's international tournaments
Start date	Tournament				Winners		
19 February 2016	(Bangladesh) 2016 Asia Cup Qualifier				UAE		
24 February 2016	(Bangladesh) 2016 Asia Cup				India		
8 March 2016	(India) 2016 ICC World Twenty20				West Indies		
16 April 2016	(South Africa) 2016 ICC Africa Twenty20 Division Two				Sierra Leone		

Women's International Tours
Start date	Home team	Away team	Results [Matches]		
Start date	Home team	Away team	WODI	WT20I	WT20
13 October 2015	West Indies	Pakistan	3–1 [4]	3–0 [3]	—
3 November 2015	New Zealand	Sri Lanka	5–0 [5]	3–0 [3]	—
17 November 2015	Bangladesh	Zimbabwe	—	—	2–0 [2]
26 January 2016	Australia	India	2–1 [3]	1–2 [3]	—
2 February 2016	South Africa	England	1–2 [3]	1–2 [3]	—
15 February 2016	India	Sri Lanka	3–0 [3]	3–0 [3]	—
20 February 2016	New Zealand	Australia	1–2 [3]	2–1 [3]	—
22 February 2016	South Africa	West Indies	1–2 [3]	2–1 [3]	—
Women's international tournaments
Start date	Tournament			Winners	
28 November 2015	(Thailand) 2015 ICC Women's World Twenty20 Qualifier			Ireland	
15 March 2016	(India) 2016 ICC Women's World Twenty20			West Indies	

Youth tournaments
Start date	Tournament	Winners
14 October 2015	(Malaysia) 2015 ICC Under-19 Cricket World Cup Qualifier	Nepal
22 January 2016	(Bangladesh) 2016 ICC Under-19 Cricket World Cup	West Indies

== Rankings ==
The following are the rankings at the beginning of the season.

ICC Test Championship 1 September 2015
Rank	Team	Matches	Points	Rating
1	South Africa	24	3008	125
2	Australia	32	3376	106
3	England	36	3686	102
4	Pakistan	24	2419	101
5	India	27	2710	100
6	New Zealand	29	2875	99
7	Sri Lanka	29	2595	89
8	West Indies	26	2101	81
9	Bangladesh	22	1026	47
10	Zimbabwe	10	53	5

ICC ODI Championship 11 September 2015
Rank	Team	Matches	Points	Rating
1	Australia	43	5419	126
2	India	51	5875	115
3	South Africa	52	5739	110
4	New Zealand	48	5250	109
5	Sri Lanka	60	6204	103
6	England	51	5108	100
7	Bangladesh	34	3253	96
8	Pakistan	50	4487	90
9	West Indies	35	3094	88
10	Ireland	12	589	49
11	Zimbabwe	36	1624	45
12	Afghanistan	15	618	41

ICC T20I Championship 31 August 2015
Rank	Team	Matches	Points	Rating
1	Sri Lanka	15	1891	126
2	Pakistan	22	2642	120
3	Australia	17	2006	118
4	India	12	1413	118
5	West Indies	17	1994	117
6	South Africa	23	2548	111
7	New Zealand	19	2047	108
8	England	17	1825	107
9	Bangladesh	12	926	77
10	Afghanistan	10	733	73
11	Hong Kong	7	503	72
12	Scotland	10	661	66
13	Netherlands	14	859	61
14	Zimbabwe	10	556	56
15	Ireland	10	422	42
Insufficient matches
	PNG	3	0	70
	UAE	5	0	0
	Oman	1	0	0

ICC Women's Rankings 1 October 2015
Rank	Team	Matches	Points	Rating
1	Australia	41	5490	134
2	England	39	4851	124
3	New Zealand	37	4040	109
4	India	29	3034	105
5	West Indies	41	4056	99
6	South Africa	40	3668	92
7	Pakistan	36	2904	81
8	Sri Lanka	37	2735	74
9	Bangladesh	13	742	57
10	Ireland	15	392	26

== October ==
=== South Africa in India ===
T20I series
No.	Date	Home captain	Away captain	Venue	Result
T20I 456	2 October	MS Dhoni	Faf du Plessis	Himachal Pradesh Cricket Association Stadium, Dharamshala	South Africa by 7 wickets
T20I 457	5 October	MS Dhoni	Faf du Plessis	Barabati Stadium, Cuttack	South Africa by 6 wickets
T20I 457a	8 October	MS Dhoni	Faf du Plessis	Eden Gardens, Kolkata	Match abandoned
ODI series
No.	Date	Home captain	Away captain	Venue	Result
ODI 3689	11 October	MS Dhoni	AB de Villiers	Green Park Stadium, Kanpur	South Africa by 5 runs
ODI 3692	14 October	MS Dhoni	AB de Villiers	Holkar Stadium, Indore	India by 22 runs
ODI 3695	18 October	MS Dhoni	AB de Villiers	Saurashtra Cricket Association Stadium, Rajkot	South Africa by 18 runs
ODI 3698	22 October	MS Dhoni	AB de Villiers	M. A. Chidambaram Stadium, Chennai	India by 35 runs
ODI 3700	25 October	MS Dhoni	AB de Villiers	Wankhede Stadium, Mumbai	South Africa by 214 runs
2015 Freedom Trophy – Test series
No.	Date	Home captain	Away captain	Venue	Result
Test 2186	5–9 November	Virat Kohli	Hashim Amla	I. S. Bindra Stadium, Mohali	India by 108 runs
Test 2188	14–18 November	Virat Kohli	Hashim Amla	M. Chinnaswamy Stadium, Bengaluru	Match drawn
Test 2189	25–29 November	Virat Kohli	Hashim Amla	Vidarbha Cricket Association Stadium, Nagpur	India by 124 runs
Test 2191	3–7 December	Virat Kohli	Hashim Amla	Feroz Shah Kotla Ground, New Delhi	India by 337 runs

=== Australia in Bangladesh ===
Australia were scheduled to tour Bangladesh for 2 Tests in October, but the tour was cancelled by Cricket Australia due to security concerns.

=== Ireland in Zimbabwe ===
ODI series
No.	Date	Home captain	Away captain	Venue	Result
ODI 3688	9 October	Elton Chigumbura	William Porterfield	Harare Sports Club, Harare	Zimbabwe by 2 wickets
ODI 3690	11 October	Elton Chigumbura	William Porterfield	Harare Sports Club, Harare	Zimbabwe by 5 wickets
ODI 3691	13 October	Elton Chigumbura	William Porterfield	Harare Sports Club, Harare	Ireland by 2 wickets

=== England vs. Pakistan in United Arab Emirates ===
Test series
No.	Date	Home captain	Away captain	Venue	Result
Test 2180	13–17 October	Misbah-ul-Haq	Alastair Cook	Sheikh Zayed Cricket Stadium, Abu Dhabi	Match drawn
Test 2183	22–26 October	Misbah-ul-Haq	Alastair Cook	Dubai International Cricket Stadium, Dubai	Pakistan by 178 runs
Test 2184	1–5 November	Misbah-ul-Haq	Alastair Cook	Sharjah Cricket Stadium, Sharjah	Pakistan by 127 runs
ODI series
No.	Date	Home captain	Away captain	Venue	Result
ODI 3707	11 November	Azhar Ali	Eoin Morgan	Sheikh Zayed Cricket Stadium, Abu Dhabi	Pakistan by 6 wickets
ODI 3708	13 November	Azhar Ali	Eoin Morgan	Sheikh Zayed Cricket Stadium, Abu Dhabi	England by 95 runs
ODI 3710	17 November	Azhar Ali	Eoin Morgan	Sharjah Cricket Stadium, Sharjah	England by 6 wickets
ODI 3712	20 November	Azhar Ali	Eoin Morgan	Dubai International Cricket Stadium, Dubai	England by 84 runs
T20I series
No.	Date	Home captain	Away captain	Venue	Result
T20I 468	26 November	Shahid Afridi	Eoin Morgan	Dubai International Cricket Stadium, Dubai	England by 14 runs
T20I 469	27 November	Shahid Afridi	Jos Buttler	Dubai International Cricket Stadium, Dubai	England by 3 runs
T20I 473	30 November	Shahid Afridi	Eoin Morgan	Sharjah Cricket Stadium, Sharjah	Match tied (England won S/O)

=== West Indies in Sri Lanka ===
2015 Sobers–Tissera Trophy – Test series
No.	Date	Home captain	Away captain	Venue	Result
Test 2181	14–18 October	Angelo Mathews	Jason Holder	Galle International Stadium, Galle	Sri Lanka by an innings and 6 runs
Test 2182	22–26 October	Angelo Mathews	Jason Holder	Paikiasothy Saravanamuttu Stadium, Colombo	Sri Lanka by 72 runs
ODI series
No.	Date	Home captain	Away captain	Venue	Result
ODI 3701	1 November	Angelo Mathews	Jason Holder	R. Premadasa Stadium, Colombo	Sri Lanka by 1 wicket (DLS)
ODI 3702	4 November	Angelo Mathews	Marlon Samuels	R. Premadasa Stadium, Colombo	Sri Lanka by 8 wickets (DLS)
ODI 3704	7 November	Angelo Mathews	Jason Holder	Pallekele International Cricket Stadium, Kandy	Sri Lanka by 19 runs (DLS)
T20I series
No.	Date	Home captain	Away captain	Venue	Result
T20I 460	9 November	Lasith Malinga	Daren Sammy	Pallekele International Cricket Stadium, Kandy	Sri Lanka by 30 runs
T20I 461	11 November	Lasith Malinga	Daren Sammy	R. Premadasa Stadium, Colombo	West Indies by 23 runs

=== Afghanistan in Zimbabwe ===
ODI series
No.	Date	Home captain	Away captain	Venue	Result
ODI 3693	16 October	Elton Chigumbura	Asghar Stanikzai	Queens Sports Club, Bulawayo	Zimbabwe by 8 wickets
ODI 3694	18 October	Elton Chigumbura	Asghar Stanikzai	Queens Sports Club, Bulawayo	Afghanistan by 58 runs
ODI 3696	20 October	Elton Chigumbura	Asghar Stanikzai	Queens Sports Club, Bulawayo	Zimbabwe by 6 wickets
ODI 3697	22 October	Elton Chigumbura	Asghar Stanikzai	Queens Sports Club, Bulawayo	Afghanistan by 3 wickets
ODI 3699	24 October	Elton Chigumbura	Asghar Stanikzai	Queens Sports Club, Bulawayo	Afghanistan by 73 runs
T20I series
No.	Date	Home captain	Away captain	Venue	Result
T20I 458	26 October	Elton Chigumbura	Asghar Stanikzai	Queens Sports Club, Bulawayo	Afghanistan by 6 wickets
T20I 459	28 October	Elton Chigumbura	Asghar Stanikzai	Queens Sports Club, Bulawayo	Afghanistan by 5 wickets

=== Pakistan Women in West Indies ===
WODI series
No.	Date	Home captain	Away captain	Venue	Result
WODI 959	16 October	Stafanie Taylor	Sana Mir	Beausejour Stadium, Gros Islet	Pakistan by 6 wickets
WODI 960	18 October	Stafanie Taylor	Sana Mir	Beausejour Stadium, Gros Islet	West Indies by 3 wickets
WODI 961	21 October	Stafanie Taylor	Sana Mir	Beausejour Stadium, Gros Islet	West Indies by 109 runs
WODI 962	24 October	Stafanie Taylor	Sana Mir	Beausejour Stadium, Gros Islet	West Indies by 6 wickets
WT20I series
No.	Date	Home captain	Away captain	Venue	Result
WT20I 318	29 October	Stafanie Taylor	Sana Mir	National Cricket Stadium, St. George's	West Indies by 8 wickets
WT20I 319	31 October	Stafanie Taylor	Sana Mir	National Cricket Stadium, St. George's	West Indies by 11 runs (DLS)
WT20I 320	1 November	Stafanie Taylor	Sana Mir	National Cricket Stadium, St. George's	Match tied (DLS) (West Indies won S/O)

=== Ireland in Namibia ===
2015–17 ICC Intercontinental Cup - FC series
No.	Date	Home captain	Away captain	Venue	Result
First-class	24–27 October	Stephan Baard	William Porterfield	Wanderers Cricket Ground, Windhoek	Ireland by an innings and 107 runs

=== Kenya in Namibia ===
2015–17 ICC World Cricket League Championship - LA series
No.	Date	Home captain	Away captain	Venue	Result
List A	30 October	Stephan Baard	Irfan Karim	Wanderers Cricket Ground, Windhoek	Kenya by 11 runs
List A	2 November	Stephan Baard	Irfan Karim	Wanderers Cricket Ground, Windhoek	Kenya by 92 runs

== November ==
=== Sri Lanka Women in New Zealand ===
WODI series
No.	Date	Home captain	Away captain	Venue	Result
WODI 963	3 November	Suzie Bates	Shashikala Siriwardene	Bert Sutcliffe Oval, Lincoln	New Zealand by 96 runs
WODI 964	5 November	Suzie Bates	Shashikala Siriwardene	Bert Sutcliffe Oval, Lincoln	New Zealand by 10 wickets
WODI 965	7 November	Suzie Bates	Shashikala Siriwardene	Bert Sutcliffe Oval, Lincoln	New Zealand by 188 runs
WODI 966	10 November	Suzie Bates	Chamari Athapaththu	Bert Sutcliffe Oval, Lincoln	New Zealand by 10 wickets
WODI 967	13 November	Suzie Bates	Chamari Athapaththu	Hagley Oval, Christchurch	New Zealand by 8 wickets
WT20I series
No.	Date	Home captain	Away captain	Venue	Result
WT20I 321	15 November	Suzie Bates	Chamari Athapaththu	Hagley Oval, Christchurch	New Zealand by 102 runs
WT20I 322	20 November	Suzie Bates	Chamari Athapaththu	Saxton Oval, Nelson	New Zealand by 11 runs
WT20I 323	22 November	Suzie Bates	Chamari Athapaththu	Saxton Oval, Nelson	New Zealand by 9 wickets

=== New Zealand in Australia ===
2015 Trans-Tasman Trophy - Test series
No.	Date	Home captain	Away captain	Venue	Result
Test 2185	5–9 November	Steve Smith	Brendon McCullum	The Gabba, Brisbane	Australia by 208 runs
Test 2187	13–17 November	Steve Smith	Brendon McCullum	WACA Ground, Perth	Match drawn
Test 2190	27 November–1 December	Steve Smith	Brendon McCullum	Adelaide Oval, Adelaide	Australia by 3 wickets

=== Zimbabwe in Bangladesh ===
ODI series
No.	Date	Home captain	Away captain	Venue	Result
ODI 3703	7 November	Mashrafe Mortaza	Elton Chigumbura	Sher-e-Bangla National Cricket Stadium, Dhaka	Bangladesh by 145 runs
ODI 3705	9 November	Mashrafe Mortaza	Elton Chigumbura	Sher-e-Bangla National Cricket Stadium, Dhaka	Bangladesh by 58 runs
ODI 3706	11 November	Mashrafe Mortaza	Elton Chigumbura	Sher-e-Bangla National Cricket Stadium, Dhaka	Bangladesh by 61 runs
T20I series (November 2015)
No.	Date	Home captain	Away captain	Venue	Result
T20I 462	13 November	Mashrafe Mortaza	Elton Chigumbura	Sher-e-Bangla National Cricket Stadium, Dhaka	Bangladesh by 4 wickets
T20I 463	15 November	Mashrafe Mortaza	Elton Chigumbura	Sher-e-Bangla National Cricket Stadium, Dhaka	Zimbabwe by 3 wickets
T20I series (January 2016)
No.	Date	Home captain	Away captain	Venue	Result
T20I 479	15 January	Mashrafe Mortaza	Elton Chigumbura	Sheikh Abu Naser Stadium, Khulna	Bangladesh by 4 wickets
T20I 481	17 January	Mashrafe Mortaza	Hamilton Masakadza	Sheikh Abu Naser Stadium, Khulna	Bangladesh by 42 runs
T20I 482	20 January	Mashrafe Mortaza	Hamilton Masakadza	Sheikh Abu Naser Stadium, Khulna	Zimbabwe by 31 runs
T20I 484	22 January	Mashrafe Mortaza	Elton Chigumbura	Sheikh Abu Naser Stadium, Khulna	Zimbabwe by 18 runs

=== Hong Kong in United Arab Emirates ===
2015–17 ICC Intercontinental Cup - FC series
No.	Date	Home captain	Away captain	Venue	Result
First-class	11–14 November	Ahmed Raza	Tanwir Afzal	ICC Academy Ground, Dubai	Hong Kong by 276 runs
2015–17 ICC World Cricket League Championship - ODI series
No.	Date	Home captain	Away captain	Venue	Result
ODI 3709	16 November	Ahmed Raza	Tanwir Afzal	ICC Academy Ground, Dubai	Hong Kong by 89 runs
ODI 3711	18 November	Ahmed Raza	Tanwir Afzal	ICC Academy Ground, Dubai	Hong Kong by 136 runs

=== Papua New Guinea vs. Nepal in United Arab Emirates ===
2015–17 ICC World Cricket League Championship - LA series
No.	Date	Home captain	Away captain	Venue	Result
List A	16 November	Paras Khadka	Chris Amini	Sheikh Zayed Cricket Stadium, Abu Dhabi	Papua New Guinea by 2 wickets
List A	18 November	Paras Khadka	Chris Amini	Sheikh Zayed Cricket Stadium, Abu Dhabi	Papua New Guinea by 3 wickets

=== Zimbabwe Women in Bangladesh ===
WT20 series
No.	Date	Home captain	Away captain	Venue	Result
1st WT20	17 November	Jahanara Alam	Chipo Mugeri	Sheikh Kamal International Stadium, Cox's Bazar	Bangladesh by 35 runs
2nd WT20	19 November	Jahanara Alam	Chipo Mugeri	Sheikh Kamal International Stadium, Cox's Bazar	Bangladesh by 8 wickets

=== Hong Kong vs. Oman in United Arab Emirates ===
T20I series
No.	Date	Team 1 captain	Team 2 captain	Venue	Result
T20I 464	21 November	Tanwir Afzal	Sultan Ahmed	Sheikh Zayed Cricket Stadium, Abu Dhabi	Oman by 6 wickets
T20I 466	25 November	Tanwir Afzal	Sultan Ahmed	Sheikh Zayed Cricket Stadium, Abu Dhabi	Oman by 4 runs
T20I 467	26 November	Tanwir Afzal	Sultan Ahmed	Sheikh Zayed Cricket Stadium, Abu Dhabi	Hong Kong by 8 wickets

=== Papua New Guinea vs. Afghanistan in United Arab Emirates ===
2015–17 ICC Intercontinental Cup - FC series
No.	Date	Home captain	Away captain	Venue	Result
First-class	21–24 November	Asghar Stanikzai	Jack Vare	Sharjah Cricket Stadium, Sharjah	Afghanistan by 201 runs

=== Oman in United Arab Emirates ===
T20I series
No.	Date	Home captain	Away captain	Venue	Result
T20I 465	22 November	Ahmed Raza	Sultan Ahmed	Sheikh Zayed Cricket Stadium, Abu Dhabi	United Arab Emirates by 7 wickets

=== Afghanistan vs. Hong Kong in United Arab Emirates ===
T20I series
No.	Date	Team 1 captain	Team 2 captain	Venue	Result
T20I 470	28 November	Asghar Stanikzai	Tanwir Afzal	Sheikh Zayed Cricket Stadium, Abu Dhabi	Hong Kong by 4 wickets

=== Afghanistan vs. Oman in United Arab Emirates ===
T20I series
No.	Date	Team 1 captain	Team 2 captain	Venue	Result
T20I 471	29 November	Asghar Stanikzai	Sultan Ahmed	Sheikh Zayed Cricket Stadium, Abu Dhabi	Afghanistan by 27 runs
T20I 472	30 November	Asghar Stanikzai	Sultan Ahmed	Sheikh Zayed Cricket Stadium, Abu Dhabi	Afghanistan by 12 runs

=== 2015 ICC Women's World Twenty20 Qualifier ===
Team	Pld	W	L	T	NR	Pts	NRR
Bangladesh	3	3	0	0	0	6	+2.518
Scotland	3	2	1	0	0	4	–0.048
Papua New Guinea	3	1	2	0	0	2	–0.831
Thailand	3	0	3	0	0	0	–1.603

Team	Pld	W	L	T	NR	Pts	NRR
Ireland	3	3	0	0	0	6	+1.743
Zimbabwe	3	2	1	0	0	4	–0.221
China	3	1	2	0	0	2	–0.489
Netherlands	3	0	3	0	0	0	–1.036

Group stage
No.	Date	Team 1	Captain 1	Team 2	Captain 2	Venue	Result
Match 1	28 November	Thailand	Somnarin Tippoch	Bangladesh	Jahanara Alam	Thailand Cricket Ground, Bangkok	Bangladesh by 73 runs
Match 2	28 November	Ireland	Isobel Joyce	Netherlands	Esther de Lange	Asian Institute of Technology Ground, Bangkok	Ireland by 8 wickets
Match 3	28 November	PNG	Norma Ovasuru	Scotland	Abbi Aitken	Thailand Cricket Ground, Bangkok	Scotland by 8 wickets
Match 4	28 November	China	Huang Zhuo	Zimbabwe	Chipo Mugeri	Asian Institute of Technology Ground, Bangkok	Zimbabwe by 10 wickets
Match 5	29 November	China	Huang Zhuo	Ireland	Isobel Joyce	Thailand Cricket Ground, Bangkok	Ireland by 28 runs
Match 6	29 November	Bangladesh	Jahanara Alam	Scotland	Abbi Aitken	Asian Institute of Technology Ground, Bangkok	Bangladesh by 8 wickets
Match 7	29 November	Netherlands	Esther de Lange	Zimbabwe	Chipo Mugeri	Thailand Cricket Ground, Bangkok	Zimbabwe by 2 runs
Match 8	29 November	Thailand	Somnarin Tippoch	PNG	Norma Ovasuru	Asian Institute of Technology Ground, Bangkok	Papua New Guinea by 7 wickets
Match 9	1 December	Thailand	Somnarin Tippoch	Scotland	Abbi Aitken	Thailand Cricket Ground, Bangkok	Scotland by 6 wickets
Match 10	1 December	Bangladesh	Jahanara Alam	PNG	Norma Ovasuru	Asian Institute of Technology Ground, Bangkok	Bangladesh by 41 runs
Match 11	1 December	Ireland	Isobel Joyce	Zimbabwe	Chipo Mugeri	Thailand Cricket Ground, Bangkok	Ireland by 7 wickets
Match 12	1 December	China	Huang Zhuo	Netherlands	Esther de Lange	Asian Institute of Technology Ground, Bangkok	China by 5 wickets
Playoffs
Match 13	3 December	Bangladesh	Jahanara Alam	Zimbabwe	Chipo Mugeri	Thailand Cricket Ground, Bangkok	Bangladesh by 31 runs
Match 14	3 December	PNG	Norma Ovasuru	Netherlands	Esther de Lange	Asian Institute of Technology Ground, Bangkok	Papua New Guinea by 1 wicket
Match 15	3 December	Ireland	Isobel Joyce	Scotland	Abbi Aitken	Thailand Cricket Ground, Bangkok	Ireland by 9 wickets
Match 16	3 December	China	Huang Zhuo	Thailand	Somnarin Tippoch	Asian Institute of Technology Ground, Bangkok	China by 5 runs
Match 17	5 December	Netherlands	Esther de Lange	Thailand	Somnarin Tippoch	Thailand Cricket Ground, Bangkok	Thailand by 9 wickets
Match 18	5 December	Scotland	Abbi Aitken	Zimbabwe	Chipo Mugeri	Asian Institute of Technology Ground, Bangkok	Zimbabwe by 3 wickets
Match 19	5 December	PNG	Norma Ovasuru	China	Huang Zhuo	Asian Institute of Technology Ground, Bangkok	Papua New Guinea by 7 wickets
Match 20	5 December	Bangladesh	Jahanara Alam	Ireland	Isobel Joyce	Thailand Cricket Ground, Bangkok	Ireland by 2 wickets

=== Final standings ===
Position	Team
1st	Ireland
2nd	Bangladesh
3rd	Zimbabwe
4th	Scotland
5th	Papua New Guinea
6th	China
7th	Thailand
8th	Netherlands

Qualified for the 2016 ICC Women's World Twenty20.

== December ==
=== Sri Lanka in New Zealand ===
Test series
No.	Date	Home captain	Away captain	Venue	Result
Test 2192	10–14 December	Brendon McCullum	Angelo Mathews	University Oval, Dunedin	New Zealand by 122 runs
Test 2194	18–22 December	Brendon McCullum	Angelo Mathews	Seddon Park, Hamilton	New Zealand by 5 wickets
ODI series
No.	Date	Home captain	Away captain	Venue	Result
ODI 3714	26 December	Brendon McCullum	Angelo Mathews	Hagley Oval, Christchurch	New Zealand by 7 wickets
ODI 3715	28 December	Brendon McCullum	Angelo Mathews	Hagley Oval, Christchurch	New Zealand by 10 wickets
ODI 3717	31 December	Kane Williamson	Angelo Mathews	Saxton Oval, Nelson	Sri Lanka by 8 wickets
ODI 3718	2 January	Kane Williamson	Angelo Mathews	Saxton Oval, Nelson	No result
ODI 3721	5 January	Kane Williamson	Angelo Mathews	Bay Oval, Mount Maunganui	New Zealand by 36 runs
T20I series
No.	Date	Home captain	Away captain	Venue	Result
T20I 474	7 January	Kane Williamson	Dinesh Chandimal	Bay Oval, Mount Maunganui	New Zealand by 3 runs
T20I 476	10 January	Kane Williamson	Dinesh Chandimal	Eden Park, Auckland	New Zealand by 9 wickets

=== West Indies in Australia ===
2015–16 Frank Worrell Trophy - Test series
No.	Date	Home captain	Away captain	Venue	Result
Test 2193	10–14 December	Steve Smith	Jason Holder	Bellerive Oval, Hobart	Australia by an innings and 212 runs
Test 2195	26–30 December	Steve Smith	Jason Holder	Melbourne Cricket Ground, Melbourne	Australia by 177 runs
Test 2198	3–7 January	Steve Smith	Jason Holder	Sydney Cricket Ground, Sydney	Match drawn

=== Zimbabwe vs. Afghanistan in United Arab Emirates ===
ODI series
No.	Date	Home captain	Away captain	Venue	Result
ODI 3713	25 December	Asghar Stanikzai	Elton Chigumbura	Sharjah Cricket Stadium, Sharjah	Afghanistan by 49 runs
ODI 3716	29 December	Asghar Stanikzai	Elton Chigumbura	Sharjah Cricket Stadium, Sharjah	Afghanistan by 4 wickets
ODI 3719	2 January	Asghar Stanikzai	Elton Chigumbura	Sharjah Cricket Stadium, Sharjah	Zimbabwe by 117 runs
ODI 3720	4 January	Asghar Stanikzai	Elton Chigumbura	Sharjah Cricket Stadium, Sharjah	Zimbabwe by 65 runs
ODI 3722	6 January	Asghar Stanikzai	Elton Chigumbura	Sharjah Cricket Stadium, Sharjah	Afghanistan by 2 wickets
T20I series
No.	Date	Home captain	Away captain	Venue	Result
T20I 475	8 January	Asghar Stanikzai	Elton Chigumbura	Sharjah Cricket Stadium, Sharjah	Afghanistan by 5 runs
T20I 477	10 January	Asghar Stanikzai	Elton Chigumbura	Sharjah Cricket Stadium, Sharjah	Afghanistan by 81 runs

=== England in South Africa ===
2015–16 Basil D'Oliveira Trophy - Test series
No.	Date	Home captain	Away captain	Venue	Result
Test 2196	26–30 December	Hashim Amla	Alastair Cook	Kingsmead Cricket Ground, Durban	England by 241 runs
Test 2197	2–6 January	Hashim Amla	Alastair Cook	Newlands Cricket Ground, Cape Town	Match drawn
Test 2199	14–18 January	AB de Villiers	Alastair Cook	Wanderers Stadium, Johannesburg	England by 7 wickets
Test 2200	22–26 January	AB de Villiers	Alastair Cook	Centurion Park, Centurion	South Africa by 280 runs
ODI series
No.	Date	Home captain	Away captain	Venue	Result
ODI 3732	3 February	AB de Villiers	Eoin Morgan	Chevrolet Park, Bloemfontein	England by 39 runs (DLS)
ODI 3734	6 February	AB de Villiers	Eoin Morgan	St George's Oval, Port Elizabeth	England by 5 wickets
ODI 3736	9 February	AB de Villiers	Eoin Morgan	Centurion Park, Centurion	South Africa by 7 wickets
ODI 3737	12 February	AB de Villiers	Eoin Morgan	Wanderers Stadium, Johannesburg	South Africa by 1 wicket
ODI 3738	14 February	AB de Villiers	Eoin Morgan	Newlands Cricket Ground, Cape Town	South Africa by 5 wickets
T20I series
No.	Date	Home captain	Away captain	Venue	Result
T20I 503	19 February	Faf du Plessis	Eoin Morgan	Newlands Cricket Ground, Cape Town	South Africa by 3 wickets
T20I 506	21 February	Faf du Plessis	Eoin Morgan	Wanderers Stadium, Johannesburg	South Africa by 9 wickets

=== India vs. Pakistan in Sri Lanka ===
India and Pakistan were scheduled to play a limited-overs series in December but the tour was eventually cancelled because the Indian cricket team did not receive security clearance from the government.

== January ==
=== India in Australia ===
ODI series
No.	Date	Home captain	Away captain	Venue	Result
ODI 3723	12 January	Steve Smith	MS Dhoni	WACA Ground, Perth	Australia by 5 wickets
ODI 3724	15 January	Steve Smith	MS Dhoni	The Gabba, Brisbane	Australia by 7 wickets
ODI 3725	17 January	Steve Smith	MS Dhoni	Melbourne Cricket Ground, Melbourne	Australia by 3 wickets
ODI 3726	20 January	Steve Smith	MS Dhoni	Manuka Oval, Canberra	Australia by 25 runs
ODI 3727	23 January	Steve Smith	MS Dhoni	Sydney Cricket Ground, Sydney	India by 6 wickets
T20I series
No.	Date	Home captain	Away captain	Venue	Result
T20I 485	26 January	Aaron Finch	MS Dhoni	Adelaide Oval, Adelaide	India by 37 runs
T20I 486	29 January	Aaron Finch	MS Dhoni	Melbourne Cricket Ground, Melbourne	India by 27 runs
T20I 489	31 January	Shane Watson	MS Dhoni	Sydney Cricket Ground, Sydney	India by 7 wickets

=== Pakistan in New Zealand ===
T20I series
No.	Date	Home captain	Away captain	Venue	Result
T20I 478	15 January	Kane Williamson	Shahid Afridi	Eden Park, Auckland	Pakistan by 16 runs
T20I 480	17 January	Kane Williamson	Shahid Afridi	Seddon Park, Hamilton	New Zealand by 10 wickets
T20I 483	22 January	Kane Williamson	Shahid Afridi	Wellington Regional Stadium, Wellington	New Zealand by 95 runs
ODI series
No.	Date	Home captain	Away captain	Venue	Result
ODI 3728	25 January	Kane Williamson	Azhar Ali	Basin Reserve, Wellington	New Zealand by 70 runs
ODI 3729a	28 January	Kane Williamson	Azhar Ali	McLean Park, Napier	Match abandoned
ODI 3730	31 January	Brendon McCullum	Azhar Ali	Eden Park, Auckland	New Zealand by 3 wickets (DLS)

=== Scotland in Hong Kong ===
2015–17 ICC Intercontinental Cup - FC series
No.	Date	Home captain	Away captain	Venue	Result
First-class	21–24 January	Tanwir Afzal	Preston Mommsen	Mission Road Ground, Mong Kok	Match abandoned
2015–17 ICC World Cricket League Championship - ODI series
No.	Date	Home captain	Away captain	Venue	Result
ODI 3729	26 January	Tanwir Afzal	Preston Mommsen	Mission Road Ground, Mong Kok	Hong Kong by 109 runs
ODI 3731a	28/29 January	Tanwir Afzal	Preston Mommsen	Mission Road Ground, Mong Kok	Match abandoned
T20I series
No.	Date	Home captain	Away captain	Venue	Result
T20I 487	30 January	Tanwir Afzal	Preston Mommsen	Mission Road Ground, Mong Kok	Hong Kong by 9 wickets
T20I 488	31 January	Tanwir Afzal	Preston Mommsen	Mission Road Ground, Mong Kok	Scotland by 37 runs

=== Netherlands in United Arab Emirates ===
2015–17 ICC Intercontinental Cup - FC series
No.	Date	Home captain	Away captain	Venue	Result
First-class	21–24 January	Ahmed Raza	Peter Borren	Sheikh Zayed Cricket Stadium	Netherlands by 4 wickets
2015–17 ICC World Cricket League Championship - List A series
No.	Date	Home captain	Away captain	Venue	Result
List A	27 January	Ahmed Raza	Peter Borren	Sheikh Zayed Cricket Stadium	Netherlands by 7 wickets
List A	29 January	Ahmed Raza	Peter Borren	Sheikh Zayed Cricket Stadium	Netherlands by 6 runs
T20I series
No.	Date	Home captain	Away captain	Venue	Result
T20I 490	3 February	Ahmed Raza	Peter Borren	ICC Academy, Dubai	Netherlands by 84 runs

=== Ireland vs. Papua New Guinea in Australia ===
2015–17 ICC Intercontinental Cup - FC series
No.	Date	Home captain	Away captain	Venue	Result
First-class	31 January–3 February	Jack Vare	William Porterfield	Tony Ireland Stadium, Townsville	Ireland by 145 runs
T20I series
No.	Date	Home captain	Away captain	Venue	Result
T20I 493	6 February	Jack Vare	William Porterfield	Tony Ireland Stadium, Townsville	Ireland by 5 wickets
T20I 494	7 February	Jack Vare	William Porterfield	Tony Ireland Stadium, Townsville	Ireland by 7 runs (DLS)
T20I 495	9 February	Jack Vare	William Porterfield	Tony Ireland Stadium, Townsville	Papua New Guinea by 11 runs

=== India Women in Australia ===
WT20I series
No.	Date	Home captain	Away captain	Venue	Result
WT20I 325	26 January	Meg Lanning	Mithali Raj	Adelaide Oval, Adelaide	India by 5 wickets
WT20I 326	29 January	Meg Lanning	Mithali Raj	Melbourne Cricket Ground, Melbourne	India by 10 wickets (DLS)
WT20I 327	31 January	Meg Lanning	Mithali Raj	Sydney Cricket Ground, Sydney	Australia by 15 runs
2014–16 ICC Women's Championship - WODI series
No.	Date	Home captain	Away captain	Venue	Result
WODI 968	2 February	Meg Lanning	Mithali Raj	Manuka Oval, Canberra	Australia by 101 runs
WODI 969	5 February	Meg Lanning	Mithali Raj	Bellerive Oval, Hobart	Australia by 6 wickets
WODI 970	7 February	Meg Lanning	Mithali Raj	Bellerive Oval, Hobart	India by 5 wickets

== February ==
=== Australia in New Zealand ===
2016 Chappell–Hadlee Trophy - ODI series
No.	Date	Home captain	Away captain	Venue	Result
ODI 3731	3 February	Brendon McCullum	Steve Smith	Eden Park, Auckland	New Zealand by 159 runs
ODI 3733	6 February	Brendon McCullum	Steve Smith	Wellington Regional Stadium, Wellington	Australia by 4 wickets
ODI 3735	8 February	Brendon McCullum	Steve Smith	Seddon Park, Hamilton	New Zealand by 55 runs
2016 Trans-Tasman Trophy - Test series
No.	Date	Home captain	Away captain	Venue	Result
Test 2201	12–16 February	Brendon McCullum	Steve Smith	Basin Reserve, Wellington	Australia by an innings and 52 runs
Test 2202	20–24 February	Brendon McCullum	Steve Smith	Hagley Oval, Christchurch	Australia by 7 wickets

=== Scotland in United Arab Emirates ===
T20I series
No.	Date	Home captain	Away captain	Venue	Result
T20I 491	4 February	Ahmed Raza	Preston Mommsen	ICC Academy, Dubai	United Arab Emirates by 9 runs

=== Scotland vs. Netherlands in United Arab Emirates ===
T20I series
No.	Date	Team 1 captain	Team 2 captain	Venue	Result
T20I 492	5 February	Peter Borren	Preston Mommsen	ICC Academy, Dubai	Scotland by 37 runs

=== England Women in South Africa ===
2014–16 ICC Women's Championship - WODI series
No.	Date	Home captain	Away captain	Venue	Result
WODI 971	7 February	Mignon du Preez	Charlotte Edwards	Willowmoore Park, Benoni	England by 7 wickets (DLS)
WODI 972	12 February	Mignon du Preez	Charlotte Edwards	Centurion Park, Centurion	South Africa by 5 wickets
WODI 973	14 February	Mignon du Preez	Charlotte Edwards	Wanderers Stadium, Johannesburg	England by 5 wickets
WT20I series
No.	Date	Home captain	Away captain	Venue	Result
WT20I 328	18 February	Mignon du Preez	Charlotte Edwards	Boland Bank Park, Paarl	England won by 15 runs
WT20I 329	19 February	Mignon du Preez	Charlotte Edwards	Newlands Cricket Ground, Cape Town	South Africa by 17 runs (DLS)
WT20I 330	21 February	Mignon du Preez	Charlotte Edwards	Wanderers Stadium, Johannesburg	England by 4 wickets

=== Sri Lanka in India ===
T20I series
No.	Date	Home captain	Away captain	Venue	Result
T20I 496	9 February	MS Dhoni	Dinesh Chandimal	MCA Stadium, Pune	Sri Lanka by 5 wickets
T20I 497	12 February	MS Dhoni	Dinesh Chandimal	JSCA International Stadium Complex, Ranchi	India by 69 runs
T20I 499	14 February	MS Dhoni	Dinesh Chandimal	ACA-VDCA Cricket Stadium, Visakhapatnam	India by 9 wickets

=== Ireland in United Arab Emirates ===
T20I series
No.	Date	Home captain	Away captain	Venue	Result
T20I 498	14 February	Amjad Javed	William Porterfield	Sheikh Zayed Cricket Stadium, Abu Dhabi	Ireland by 34 runs
T20I 500	16 February	Amjad Javed	William Porterfield	Sheikh Zayed Cricket Stadium, Abu Dhabi	United Arab Emirates by 5 runs

=== Sri Lanka Women in India ===
2014–16 ICC Women's Championship - WODI series
No.	Date	Home captain	Away captain	Venue	Result
WODI 974	15 February	Mithali Raj	Shashikala Siriwardene	JSCA International Stadium Complex, Ranchi	India by 107 runs
WODI 975	17 February	Mithali Raj	Shashikala Siriwardene	JSCA International Stadium Complex, Ranchi	India by 6 wickets
WODI 976	19 February	Mithali Raj	Shashikala Siriwardene	JSCA International Stadium Complex, Ranchi	India by 7 wickets
WT20I series
No.	Date	Home captain	Away captain	Venue	Result
WT20I 331	22 February	Mithali Raj	Shashikala Siriwardene	JSCA International Stadium Complex, Ranchi	India by 34 runs
WT20I 332	24 February	Mithali Raj	Shashikala Siriwardene	JSCA International Stadium Complex, Ranchi	India by 5 wickets
WT20I 333	26 February	Mithali Raj	Shashikala Siriwardene	JSCA International Stadium Complex, Ranchi	India by 9 wickets

=== Australia Women in New Zealand ===
2016 Rose Bowl / 2014–16 ICC Women's Championship - WODI series
No.	Date	Home captain	Away captain	Venue	Result
WODI 977	20 February	Suzie Bates	Meg Lanning	Bay Oval, Mount Maunganui	New Zealand by 9 runs
WODI 978	22 February	Suzie Bates	Meg Lanning	Bay Oval, Mount Maunganui	Australia by 8 wickets
WODI 979	24 February	Suzie Bates	Meg Lanning	Bay Oval, Mount Maunganui	Australia by 6 wickets
WT20I series
No.	Date	Home captain	Away captain	Venue	Result
WT20I 334	28 February	Suzie Bates	Meg Lanning	Basin Reserve, Wellington	New Zealand by 4 wickets
WT20I 335	1 March	Suzie Bates	Meg Lanning	Basin Reserve, Wellington	New Zealand by 5 wickets
WT20I 336	4 March	Suzie Bates	Meg Lanning	Pukekura Park, New Plymouth	Australia by 17 runs

=== West Indies Women in South Africa ===
2014–16 ICC Women's Championship - WODI series
No.	Date	Home captain	Away captain	Venue	Result
WODI 980	24 February	Mignon du Preez	Stafanie Taylor	Buffalo Park, East London	West Indies by 16 runs
WODI 981	27 February	Mignon du Preez	Stafanie Taylor	Buffalo Park, East London	West Indies by 57 runs
WODI 982	29 February	Mignon du Preez	Stafanie Taylor	Buffalo Park, East London	South Africa by 35 runs
WT20I series
No.	Date	Home captain	Away captain	Venue	Result
WT20I 337	4 March	Mignon du Preez	Stafanie Taylor	Kingsmead Cricket Ground, Durban	South Africa by 11 runs
WT20I 338	6 March	Mignon du Preez	Stafanie Taylor	Wanderers Stadium, Johannesburg	West Indies by 45 runs
WT20I 339	9 March	Mignon du Preez	Stafanie Taylor	Newlands Cricket Ground, Cape Town	South Africa by 4 runs

=== 2016 Asia Cup Qualifier ===
Pos	Team	Pld	W	L	T	NR	Pts	NRR
1	United Arab Emirates	3	3	0	0	0	6	+1.678
2	Afghanistan	3	2	1	0	0	4	+0.954
3	Oman	3	1	2	0	0	2	–1.222
4	Hong Kong	3	0	3	0	0	0	–1.416

Advance to 2016 Asia Cup

Group stage
No.	Date	Team 1	Captain 1	Team 2	Captain 2	Venue	Result
T20I 501	19 February	Afghanistan	Asghar Stanikzai	United Arab Emirates	Amjad Javed	Khan Shaheb Osman Ali Stadium, Fatullah	United Arab Emirates by 16 runs
T20I 502	19 February	Hong Kong	Tanwir Afzal	Oman	Sultan Ahmed	Khan Shaheb Osman Ali Stadium, Fatullah	Oman by 5 runs
T20I 504	20 February	Afghanistan	Asghar Stanikzai	Oman	Sultan Ahmed	Khan Shaheb Osman Ali Stadium, Fatullah	Afghanistan by 3 wickets
T20I 505	21 February	Hong Kong	Tanwir Afzal	United Arab Emirates	Amjad Javed	Khan Shaheb Osman Ali Stadium, Fatullah	United Arab Emirates by 6 wickets
T20I 507	22 February	Afghanistan	Asghar Stanikzai	Hong Kong	Tanwir Afzal	Shere Bangla National Stadium, Mirpur	Afghanistan by 66 runs
T20I 508	22 February	Oman	Sultan Ahmed	United Arab Emirates	Amjad Javed	Shere Bangla National Stadium, Mirpur	United Arab Emirates by 71 runs

=== 2016 Asia Cup ===
Pos	Team	Pld	W	L	T	NR	Pts	NRR
1	India	4	4	0	0	0	16	2.020
2	Bangladesh	4	3	1	0	0	12	0.458
3	Pakistan	4	2	2	0	0	8	−0.296
4	Sri Lanka	4	1	3	0	0	4	−0.293
5	United Arab Emirates	4	0	4	0	0	0	−1.813

Advance to Final

Group stage
No.	Date	Team 1	Captain 1	Team 2	Captain 2	Venue	Result
T20I 509	24 February	Bangladesh	Mashrafe Mortaza	India	MS Dhoni	Sher-e-Bangla National Cricket Stadium, Mirpur	India by 45 runs
T20I 510	25 February	Sri Lanka	Lasith Malinga	United Arab Emirates	Amjad Javed	Sher-e-Bangla National Cricket Stadium, Mirpur	Sri Lanka by 14 runs
T20I 511	26 February	Bangladesh	Mashrafe Mortaza	United Arab Emirates	Amjad Javed	Sher-e-Bangla National Cricket Stadium, Mirpur	Bangladesh by 51 runs
T20I 512	27 February	India	MS Dhoni	Pakistan	Shahid Afridi	Sher-e-Bangla National Cricket Stadium, Mirpur	India by 5 wickets
T20I 513	28 February	Bangladesh	Mashrafe Mortaza	Sri Lanka	Angelo Mathews	Sher-e-Bangla National Cricket Stadium, Mirpur	Bangladesh by 23 runs
T20I 514	29 February	Pakistan	Shahid Afridi	United Arab Emirates	Amjad Javed	Sher-e-Bangla National Cricket Stadium, Mirpur	Pakistan by 7 wickets
T20I 515	1 March	India	MS Dhoni	Sri Lanka	Angelo Mathews	Sher-e-Bangla National Cricket Stadium, Mirpur	India by 5 wickets
T20I 516	2 March	Bangladesh	Mashrafe Mortaza	Pakistan	Shahid Afridi	Sher-e-Bangla National Cricket Stadium, Mirpur	Bangladesh by 5 wickets
T20I 517	3 March	India	MS Dhoni	United Arab Emirates	Amjad Javed	Sher-e-Bangla National Cricket Stadium, Mirpur	India by 9 wickets
T20I 518	4 March	Pakistan	Shahid Afridi	Sri Lanka	Dinesh Chandimal	Sher-e-Bangla National Cricket Stadium, Mirpur	Pakistan by 6 wickets
Final
T20I 521	6 March	India	MS Dhoni	Bangladesh	Mashrafe Mortaza	Sher-e-Bangla National Cricket Stadium, Mirpur	India by 8 wickets

== March ==
=== Australia in South Africa ===
T20I series
No.	Date	Home captain	Away captain	Venue	Result
T20I 519	4 March	Faf du Plessis	Steve Smith	Kingsmead Cricket Ground, Durban	South Africa by 3 wickets
T20I 520	6 March	Faf du Plessis	Steve Smith	Wanderers Stadium, Johannesburg	Australia by 5 wickets
T20I 526	9 March	Faf du Plessis	Steve Smith	Newlands Cricket Ground, Cape Town	Australia by 6 wickets

=== 2016 ICC World Twenty20 ===
==== First round ====
Pos	Team	Pld	W	L	NR	Pts	NRR
1	Bangladesh	3	2	0	1	5	1.938
2	Netherlands	3	1	1	1	3	0.154
3	Oman	3	1	1	1	3	−0.685
4	Ireland	3	0	2	1	1	−0.685

Source: ESPN Cricinfo

Advance to Group 2

Pos	Team	Pld	W	L	NR	Pts	NRR
1	Afghanistan	3	3	0	0	6	1.540
2	Zimbabwe	3	2	1	0	4	−0.567
3	Scotland	3	1	2	0	2	−0.132
4	Hong Kong	3	0	3	0	0	−1.017

Source: ESPN Cricinfo

Advance to Group 1

Group stage
No.	Date	Team 1	Captain 1	Team 2	Captain 2	Venue	Result
T20I 522	8 March	Hong Kong	Tanwir Afzal	Zimbabwe	Hamilton Masakadza	Vidarbha Cricket Association Stadium, Nagpur	Zimbabwe by 14 runs
T20I 523	8 March	Afghanistan	Asghar Stanikzai	Scotland	Preston Mommsen	Vidarbha Cricket Association Stadium, Nagpur	Afghanistan by 14 runs
T20I 524	9 March	Bangladesh	Mashrafe Mortaza	Netherlands	Peter Borren	Himachal Pradesh Cricket Association Stadium, Dharamshala	Bangladesh by 8 runs
T20I 525	9 March	Ireland	William Porterfield	Oman	Sultan Ahmed	Himachal Pradesh Cricket Association Stadium, Dharamshala	Oman by 2 wickets
T20I 527	10 March	Scotland	Preston Mommsen	Zimbabwe	Hamilton Masakadza	Vidarbha Cricket Association Stadium, Nagpur	Zimbabwe by 11 runs
T20I 528	10 March	Afghanistan	Asghar Stanikzai	Hong Kong	Tanwir Afzal	Vidarbha Cricket Association Stadium, Nagpur	Afghanistan by 6 wickets
T20I 529	11 March	Oman	Sultan Ahmed	Netherlands	Peter Borren	Himachal Pradesh Cricket Association Stadium, Dharamshala	No result
T20I 530	11 March	Bangladesh	Mashrafe Mortaza	Ireland	William Porterfield	Himachal Pradesh Cricket Association Stadium, Dharamshala	No result
T20I 531	12 March	Zimbabwe	Hamilton Masakadza	Afghanistan	Asghar Stanikzai	Vidarbha Cricket Association Stadium, Nagpur	Afghanistan by 59 runs
T20I 532	12 March	Hong Kong	Tanwir Afzal	Scotland	Preston Mommsen	Vidarbha Cricket Association Stadium, Nagpur	Scotland by 8 wickets (DLS)
T20I 533	13 March	Ireland	William Porterfield	Netherlands	Peter Borren	Himachal Pradesh Cricket Association Stadium, Dharamshala	Netherlands by 12 runs
T20I 534	13 March	Bangladesh	Mashrafe Mortaza	Oman	Sultan Ahmed	Himachal Pradesh Cricket Association Stadium, Dharamshala	Bangladesh by 54 runs (DLS)

==== Super 10 ====
Pos	Team	Pld	W	L	NR	Pts	NRR
1	West Indies	4	3	1	0	6	0.359
2	England	4	3	1	0	6	0.145
3	South Africa	4	2	2	0	4	0.651
4	Sri Lanka	4	1	3	0	2	−0.461
5	Afghanistan	4	1	3	0	2	−0.715

Source: ESPN Cricinfo

Advance to Knockout stage

Pos	Team	Pld	W	L	NR	Pts	NRR
1	New Zealand	4	4	0	0	8	1.900
2	India	4	3	1	0	6	−0.305
3	Australia	4	2	2	0	4	0.233
4	Pakistan	4	1	3	0	2	−0.093
5	Bangladesh	4	0	4	0	0	−1.805

Source: ESPN Cricinfo

Advance to Knockout stage

Super 10
No.	Date	Team 1	Captain 1	Team 2	Captain 2	Venue	Result
T20I 535	15 March	India	MS Dhoni	New Zealand	Kane Williamson	Vidarbha Cricket Association Stadium, Nagpur	New Zealand by 47 runs
T20I 536	16 March	Bangladesh	Mashrafe Mortaza	Pakistan	Shahid Afridi	Eden Gardens, Kolkata	Pakistan by 55 runs
T20I 537	16 March	England	Eoin Morgan	West Indies	Daren Sammy	Wankhede Stadium, Mumbai	West Indies by 6 wickets
T20I 538	17 March	Afghanistan	Asghar Stanikzai	Sri Lanka	Angelo Mathews	Eden Gardens, Kolkata	Sri Lanka by 6 wickets
T20I 539	18 March	Australia	Steve Smith	New Zealand	Kane Williamson	Himachal Pradesh Cricket Association Stadium, Dharamshala	New Zealand by 8 runs
T20I 540	18 March	England	Eoin Morgan	South Africa	Faf du Plessis	Wankhede Stadium, Mumbai	England by 2 wickets
T20I 541	19 March	India	MS Dhoni	Pakistan	Shahid Afridi	Eden Gardens, Kolkata	India by 6 wickets
T20I 542	20 March	Afghanistan	Asghar Stanikzai	South Africa	Faf du Plessis	Wankhede Stadium, Mumbai	South Africa by 37 runs
T20I 543	20 March	Sri Lanka	Angelo Mathews	West Indies	Daren Sammy	M. Chinnaswamy Stadium, Bengaluru	West Indies by 7 wickets
T20I 544	21 March	Australia	Steve Smith	Bangladesh	Mashrafe Mortaza	M. Chinnaswamy Stadium, Bengaluru	Australia by 3 wickets
T20I 545	22 March	New Zealand	Kane Williamson	Pakistan	Shahid Afridi	Punjab Cricket Association IS Bindra Stadium, Mohali	New Zealand by 22 runs
T20I 546	23 March	Afghanistan	Asghar Stanikzai	England	Eoin Morgan	Feroz Shah Kotla Ground, Delhi	England by 15 runs
T20I 547	23 March	India	MS Dhoni	Bangladesh	Mashrafe Mortaza	M. Chinnaswamy Stadium, Bengaluru	India by 1 run
T20I 548	25 March	Australia	Steve Smith	Pakistan	Shahid Afridi	Punjab Cricket Association IS Bindra Stadium, Mohali	Australia by 21 runs
T20I 549	25 March	South Africa	Faf du Plessis	West Indies	Daren Sammy	Vidarbha Cricket Association Stadium, Nagpur	West Indies by 3 wickets
T20I 550	26 March	Bangladesh	Mashrafe Mortaza	New Zealand	Kane Williamson	Eden Gardens, Kolkata	New Zealand by 75 runs
T20I 551	26 March	England	Eoin Morgan	Sri Lanka	Angelo Mathews	Feroz Shah Kotla Ground, Delhi	England by 10 runs
T20I 552	27 March	Afghanistan	Asghar Stanikzai	West Indies	Daren Sammy	Vidarbha Cricket Association Stadium, Nagpur	Afghanistan by 6 runs
T20I 553	27 March	India	MS Dhoni	Australia	Steve Smith	Punjab Cricket Association IS Bindra Stadium, Mohali	India by 6 wickets
T20I 554	28 March	South Africa	Faf du Plessis	Sri Lanka	Dinesh Chandimal	Feroz Shah Kotla Ground, Delhi	South Africa by 8 wickets
Knockout stage
Semi-finals
T20I 555	30 March	New Zealand	Kane Williamson	England	Eoin Morgan	Feroz Shah Kotla Ground, Delhi	England by 7 wickets
T20I 556	31 March	West Indies	Daren Sammy	India	MS Dhoni	Wankhede Stadium, Mumbai	West Indies by 7 wickets
Final
T20I 557	3 April	England	Eoin Morgan	West Indies	Daren Sammy	Eden Gardens, Kolkata	West Indies by 4 wickets

=== 2016 ICC Women's World Twenty20 ===
Pos	Team	Pld	W	L	T	NR	Pts	NRR
1	New Zealand	4	4	0	0	0	8	2.430
2	Australia	4	3	1	0	0	6	0.613
3	Sri Lanka	4	2	2	0	0	4	−0.240
4	South Africa	4	1	3	0	0	2	0.173
5	Ireland	4	0	4	0	0	0	−2.817

Source: ESPNCricinfo

Qualified to Knockout stage

Pos	Team	Pld	W	L	T	NR	Pts	NRR
1	England	4	4	0	0	0	8	1.417
2	West Indies	4	3	1	0	0	6	0.688
3	Pakistan	4	2	2	0	0	4	−0.673
4	India	4	1	3	0	0	2	0.790
5	Bangladesh	4	0	4	0	0	0	−2.306

Source: ESPNCricinfo

Qualified to Knockout stage
Relegated to Qualifier

Group Stage
No.	Date	Team 1	Captain 1	Team 2	Captain 2	Venue	Result
WT20I 340	15 March	India	Mithali Raj	Bangladesh	Jahanara Alam	M. Chinnaswamy Stadium, Bengaluru	India by 72 runs
WT20I 341	15 March	New Zealand	Suzie Bates	Sri Lanka	Shashikala Siriwardene	Feroz Shah Kotla Ground, Delhi	New Zealand by 7 wickets
WT20I 342	16 March	Pakistan	Sana Mir	West Indies	Stafanie Taylor	M. A. Chidambaram Stadium, Chennai	West Indies by 4 runs
WT20I 343	17 March	Bangladesh	Jahanara Alam	England	Charlotte Edwards	M. Chinnaswamy Stadium, Bengaluru	England by 36 runs
WT20I 344	18 March	Ireland	Isobel Joyce	New Zealand	Suzie Bates	Punjab Cricket Association IS Bindra Stadium, Mohali	New Zealand by 93 runs
WT20I 345	18 March	Australia	Meg Lanning	South Africa	Mignon du Preez	Vidarbha Cricket Association Stadium, Nagpur	Australia by 6 wickets
WT20I 346	19 March	India	Mithali Raj	Pakistan	Sana Mir	Feroz Shah Kotla Ground, Delhi	Pakistan by 2 runs (DLS)
WT20I 347	20 March	Bangladesh	Jahanara Alam	West Indies	Stafanie Taylor	M. A. Chidambaram Stadium, Chennai	West Indies by 49 runs
WT20I 348	20 March	Sri Lanka	Shashikala Siriwardene	Ireland	Isobel Joyce	Punjab Cricket Association IS Bindra Stadium, Mohali	Sri Lanka by 14 runs
WT20I 349	21 March	Australia	Meg Lanning	New Zealand	Suzie Bates	Vidarbha Cricket Association Stadium, Nagpur	New Zealand by 6 wickets
WT20I 350	22 March	India	Mithali Raj	England	Charlotte Edwards	Himachal Pradesh Cricket Association Stadium, Dharamshala	England by 2 wickets
WT20I 351	23 March	Ireland	Isobel Joyce	South Africa	Mignon du Preez	M. A. Chidambaram Stadium, Chennai	South Africa by 67 runs
WT20I 352	24 March	Australia	Meg Lanning	Sri Lanka	Shashikala Siriwardene	Feroz Shah Kotla Ground, Delhi	Australia by 9 wickets
WT20I 353	24 March	England	Charlotte Edwards	West Indies	Stafanie Taylor	Himachal Pradesh Cricket Association Stadium, Dharamshala	England by 1 wicket
WT20I 354	24 March	Bangladesh	Jahanara Alam	Pakistan	Sana Mir	Feroz Shah Kotla Ground, Delhi	Pakistan by 9 wickets
WT20I 355	26 March	Australia	Meg Lanning	Ireland	Isobel Joyce	Feroz Shah Kotla Ground, Delhi	Australia by 7 wickets
WT20I 356	26 March	New Zealand	Suzie Bates	South Africa	Mignon du Preez	M. Chinnaswamy Stadium, Bengaluru	New Zealand by 7 wickets
WT20I 357	27 March	West Indies	Stafanie Taylor	India	Mithali Raj	Punjab Cricket Association IS Bindra Stadium, Mohali	West Indies by 3 runs
WT20I 358	27 March	England	Charlotte Edwards	Pakistan	Sana Mir	M. A. Chidambaram Stadium, Chennai	England by 68 runs
WT20I 359	28 March	South Africa	Mignon du Preez	Sri Lanka	Shashikala Siriwardene	M. Chinnaswamy Stadium, Bengaluru	Sri Lanka by 10 runs
Knockout stage
No.	Date	Team 1	Captain 1	Team 2	Captain 2	Venue	Result
Semi-finals
WT20I 360	30 March	Australia	Meg Lanning	England	Charlotte Edwards	Feroz Shah Kotla Ground, Delhi	Australia by 5 runs
WT20I 361	31 March	New Zealand	Suzie Bates	West Indies	Stafanie Taylor	Wankhede Stadium, Mumbai	West Indies by 6 runs
Final
WT20I 362	3 April	Australia	Meg Lanning	West Indies	Stafanie Taylor	Eden Gardens, Kolkata	West Indies by 8 wickets

== April ==
=== Namibia vs. Afghanistan in India ===
2015–17 ICC Intercontinental Cup - FC series
No.	Date	Home captain	Away captain	Venue	Result
First-class	10–13 April	Asghar Stanikzai	Stephan Baard	Shaheed Vijay Singh Pathik Sports Complex, Greater Noida	Afghanistan by an innings and 36 runs

=== Namibia in Nepal ===
2015–17 ICC World Cricket League Championship - List A series
No.	Date	Home captain	Away captain	Venue	Result
List A	16 April	Paras Khadka	Stephan Baard	Tribhuvan University International Cricket Ground, Kirtipur	Nepal by 5 wickets
List A	18 April	Paras Khadka	Stephan Baard	Tribhuvan University International Cricket Ground, Kirtipur	Nepal by 3 wickets

=== 2016 ICC Africa Twenty20 Division Two ===
==== Points table ====
Team	Pld	W	L	T	NR	Pts	NRR
Sierra Leone	4	4	0	0	0	8	+1.905
Mozambique	4	2	2	0	0	4	–1.156
Rwanda	4	0	4	0	0	0	–0.742

Round Robin matches
No.	Date	Team 1	Captain 1	Team 2	Captain 2	Venue	Result
Match 1	16 April	Mozambique		Sierra Leone	Lansana Lamin	Willowmoore Park, Benoni	Sierra Leone by 6 wickets
Match 2	16 April	Rwanda	Eric Dusingizimana	Mozambique		Willowmoore Park, Benoni	Mozambique by 6 wickets
Match 3	17 April	Sierra Leone	Lansana Lamin	Rwanda	Eric Dusingizimana	Willowmoore Park, Benoni	Sierra Leone by 22 runs
Match 4	17 April	Sierra Leone	Lansana Lamin	Mozambique		Willowmoore Park, Benoni	Sierra Leone by 79 runs
Match 5	19 April	Sierra Leone	Lansana Lamin	Rwanda	Eric Dusingizimana	Willowmoore Park, Benoni	Sierra Leone by 24 runs
Match 6	19 April	Mozambique		Rwanda	Eric Dusingizimana	Willowmoore Park, Benoni	Mozambique by 2 runs
