= Kishoreganj Football Stadium =

Football stadium located at Kishoreganj, Bangladesh

Coordinates: 24°26′27.70″N 90°46′41.66″E

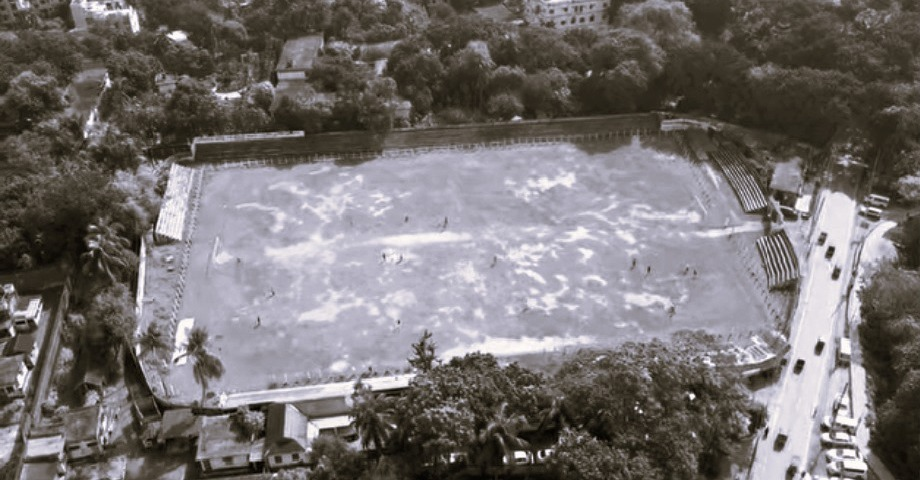
- Interactive map of Kishoreganj Football Stadium
- Location: Kishoreganj, Bangladesh
- Owner: National Sports Council
- Operator: National Sports Council
- Surface: Grass

Tenant
- Kishoreganj Football Team

Kishoreganj Football Stadium (also known as Kishoreganj Old Stadium) is located by the Kishoreganj-Mymensingh Rd, Kishoreganj, Bangladesh.

== See also ==
- Stadiums in Bangladesh
- List of football stadiums in Bangladesh
- Kishoreganj Cricket Stadium
- Sheikh Kamal International Stadium, Cox's Bazar
- Sheikh Kamal International Stadium, Gopalganj
