= Kishoreganj Cricket Stadium =

Cricket stadium located at Kishoreganj, Bangladesh

Coordinates: 24°26′39.01″N 90°46′56.31″E

- Interactive map of Kishoreganj Cricket Stadium
- Location: Kishoreganj, Bangladesh
- Owner: National Sports Council
- Operator: National Sports Council
- Surface: Grass

Tenant
- Kishoreganj Cricket Team

Kishoreganj Cricket Stadium (also known as Kishoreganj New Stadium ) is located by the District Election Commission Office, Kishoreganj, Bangladesh. Mukul niketon is a popular house near the stadium.

== See also ==
- Stadiums in Bangladesh
- List of cricket grounds in Bangladesh
- Kishoreganj Football Stadium
- Sheikh Kamal International Stadium, Cox's Bazar
- Sheikh Kamal International Stadium, Gopalganj
