= Callum Taylor =

Callum Taylor may refer to:

- Callum Taylor (English cricketer) (born 1997), English cricketer who plays for Essex
- Callum Taylor (Welsh cricketer) (born 1998), Welsh cricketer who plays for Glamorgan
- Callum Taylor (footballer) (born 2002), English footballer
