= 2016 Under-19 Cricket World Cup =

Cricket tournament

2016 ICC Under-19 Cricket World Cup
- Dates: 22 January – 14 February 2016
- Administrator: International Cricket Council (ICC)
- Cricket format: Limited-overs (50 overs)
- Tournament format(s): Round-robin and knockout
- Host: Bangladesh
- Champions: West Indies (1st title)
- Runners-up: India
- Participants: 16
- Matches: 48
- Player of the series: (Bangladesh) Mehidy Hasan
- Most runs: (England) Jack Burnham (420)
- Most wickets: (Namibia) Fritz Coetzee (15)
- Official website: Official website

The 2016 ICC Under-19 Cricket World Cup was an international limited-overs cricket tournament held in Bangladesh from 22 January to 14 February 2016. It was the eleventh edition of the Under-19 Cricket World Cup, and the second to be held in Bangladesh, after the 2004 event.

The World Cup was contested by the national under-19 teams of sixteen International Cricket Council (ICC) members, and all matches played held under-19 One Day International (ODI) status. Ten teams qualified automatically for the tournament through their status as ICC full members, while five others qualified by winning regional qualifying events. The final place at the tournament was taken by the winner of the 2015 Under-19 World Cup Qualifier, which was contested by the runners-up at the five regional qualifiers. However, on 5 January 2016, Cricket Australia announced that the Australian squad had pulled out of the tournament, citing security concerns. Ireland were invited as a replacement for Australia.

Defending champions South Africa were knocked out of the tournament in the group stage, with back-to-back defeats to Bangladesh and Namibia. The West Indies eventually defeated India by five wickets, claiming their first title. Bangladesh's captain Mehedi Hasan was named player of the tournament, while England's Jack Burnham and Namibia's Fritz Coetzee led the tournament in runs and wickets, respectively.

== Qualification ==
Team	Mode of qualification
~~Australia~~	ICC Full Member (Later withdrew)
Bangladesh	ICC Full Member
England	ICC Full Member
India	ICC Full Member
New Zealand	ICC Full Member
Pakistan	ICC Full Member
South Africa	ICC Full Member
Sri Lanka	ICC Full Member
West Indies	ICC Full Member
Zimbabwe	ICC Full Member
Afghanistan	Champion of 2014 ACC Under-19 Premier League
Namibia	Champion of 2015 ICC Africa Under-19 Championship Division One
Canada	Champion of 2015 ICC Americas Under-19 Championship
Fiji	Champion of 2015 EAP Under-19 Cricket Trophy
Scotland	Champion of 2015 ICC Europe Under-19 Championship
Nepal	Champion of 2015 ICC Under-19 Cricket World Cup Qualifier
Ireland	Runner-up of 2015 ICC Under-19 Cricket World Cup Qualifier (invited after Australia withdrew)

== Venues ==
Chittagong	Chittagong	Cox's Bazar	Dhaka
District Stadium, Chittagong	Bir Shrestho Flight Lieutenant Matiur Rahman Cricket Stadium	Sheikh Kamal International Stadium	Sher-e-Bangla National Cricket Stadium
Capacity: 20,000	Capacity: 20,000	Capacity: 7,800	Capacity: 25,416
Matches: 3	Matches: 4	Matches: 17	Matches: 9
Fatullah	Sylhet	Sylhet	
Khan Shaheb Osman Ali Stadium	Sylhet District Stadium	Sylhet International Cricket Stadium	
Capacity: 25,000	Capacity: 18,000	Capacity: 18,500	
Matches: 10	Matches: 2	Matches: 3	

Venues for the 2016 Under-19 World Cup

== Squads ==
Each team selected a 15-man squad for the tournament.

== Warm-up games ==
Warm-up matches

22 January
09:00
Scorecard

West Indies; 342/4 (50 overs)	v	Scotland; 194/7 (50 overs)
Shimron Hetmyer 135 (116); Mitchell Rao 1/37 (6 overs)		Ben Wilkinson 63 (97); Shamar Springer 3/19 (5 overs)

West Indies won by 148 runs
Khan Shaheb Osman Ali Stadium, Fatullah
Umpires: Ruchira Palliyaguruge (SL) and Langton Rusere (Zim)

- West Indies won the toss and elected to bat.

22 January
09:00
Scorecard

South Africa; 332/7 (50 overs)	v	Fiji; 49 (30.4 overs)
Tony de Zorzi 105* (91); Tadulala Veitacini 4/59 (9 overs)		Malakai Cokovaki 9 (32); Sean Whitehead 5/7 (7 overs)

South Africa won by 283 runs
Khan Shaheb Osman Ali Stadium (Outer), Fatullah
Umpires: Jeremiah Matibiri (Zim) and Ian Ramage (Sco)

- South Africa won the toss and elected to bat.

23 January
09:00
Scorecard

Pakistan; 291/7 (50 overs)	v	Nepal; 181/9 (50 overs)
Zeeshan Malik 83 (85); Sushil Kandel 2/47 (10 overs)		Dipendra Singh Airee 42 (40); Saif Ali 2/9 (4 overs)

Pakistan won by 110 runs
Bangladesh Krira Shikkha Protisthan Ground (Ground 1), Savar
Umpires: Raveendra Wimalasiri (SL) and Nigel Duguid (WI)

- Nepal won the toss and elected to field.

23 January
09:00
Scorecard

New Zealand; 204/8 (50 overs)	v	Sri Lanka; 205/6 (36.1 overs)
Josh Finnie 54 (91); Lahiru Samarakoon 2/31 (6 overs)		Shammu Ashan 66* (69); Nathan Smith 2/39 (7 overs)

Sri Lanka won by 4 wickets
Bangladesh Krira Shikkha Protisthan Ground (Ground 2), Savar
Umpires: Gregory Brathwaite (WI) and Langton Rusere (Zim)

- Sri Lanka won the toss and elected to field.

23 January
09:00
Scorecard

Afghanistan; 277 (50 overs)	v	Ireland; 151 (44.3 overs)
Ihsanullah 133 (125); Rory Anders 5/40 (10 overs)		Lorcan Tucker 59* (77); Zia-ur-Rehman 2/7 (6 overs)

Afghanistan won by 126 runs
Bangladesh Krira Shikkha Protisthan Ground (Ground 3), Savar
Umpires: Rob Bailey (Eng) and Ahmed Shahab (Pak)

- Afghanistan won the toss and elected to bat.

23 January
09:00
Scorecard

India; 485/6 (50 overs)	v	Canada; 113 (31.1 overs)
Ishan Kishan 138 (86); Abdul Haseeb 1/56 (8 overs)		Harsh Thaker 25 (30); Mahipal Lomror 3/19 (7 overs)

India won by 372 runs
Bangladesh Krira Shikkha Protisthan Ground (Ground 4), Savar
Umpires: Adrian Holdstock (SA) and Jeremiah Matibiri (Zim)

- India won the toss and elected to bat.

23 January
09:00
Scorecard

England; 307/7 (50 overs)	v	Namibia; 152 (34 overs)
Daniel Lawrence 85 (94); Fritz Coetzee 2/63 (10 overs)		Charl Brits 57 (44); Sam Curran 5/10 (8 overs)

England won by 155 runs
MA Aziz Stadium, Chittagong
Umpires: Phil Jones (NZ) and Chettithody Shamshuddin (Ind)

- Namibia won the toss and elected to field.

23 January
09:00
Scorecard

Bangladesh; 284/9 (50 overs)	v	Zimbabwe; 221/7 (50 overs)
Najmul Hossain Shanto 102 (103); William Mashinge 5/67 (10 overs)		Ryan Murray 123* (123); Abdul Halim 2/46 (8 overs)

Bangladesh won by 63 runs
Zahur Ahmed Chowdhury Stadium, Chittagong
Umpires: Tim Robinson (Eng) and Mick Martell (Aus)

- Bangladesh won the toss and elected to bat.

24 January
09:00
Scorecard

West Indies; 153/9 (35 overs)	v	South Africa; 153/4 (35 overs)
Keacy Carty 45 (52); Conor McKerr 3/30 (7 overs)		Wiaan Mulder 58* (67); Jyd Goolie 1/23 (7 overs)

Match tied
Khan Shaheb Osman Ali Stadium, Fatullah
Umpires: Ahmed Shahab (Pak) and Sharfuddoula (Ban)

- South Africa won the toss and elected to field.
- Match reduced to 35 overs per side due to fog.

24 January
09:00
Scorecard

Scotland; 192/8 (36 overs)	v	Fiji; 171 (31.3 overs)
Rory Johnston 53 (67); Josaia Baleicikoibia 3/26 (7 overs)		Delaimatuku Maraiwai 57 (50); Haris Aslam 4/39 (8 overs)

Scotland won by 21 runs
Khan Shaheb Osman Ali Stadium (Outer), Fatullah
Umpires: Anisur Rahman (Ban) and Enamul Haque (Ban)

- Scotland the toss and elected to bat.
- Match reduced to 36 overs per side due to fog.

25 January
09:00
Scorecard

New Zealand; 212 (48.5 overs)	v	Afghanistan; 199 (47.3 overs)
Glenn Phillips 68 (64); Zahir Khan 5/30 (10 overs)		Karim Janat 42 (68); Rachin Ravindra 3/32 (10 overs)

New Zealand won by 13 runs
Bangladesh Krira Shikkha Protisthan Ground (Ground 1), Savar
Umpires: Rob Bailey (Eng) and Ian Ramage (Sco)

- New Zealand won the toss and elected to bat.
- Match reduced to 49 overs per side due to fog.

25 January
09:00
Scorecard

Sri Lanka; 230/9 (45 overs)	v	Nepal; 165 (42.1 overs)
Shammu Ashan 81* (74); Sunil Dhamala 2/27 (9 overs)		Dipendra Singh Airee 33* (44); Charith Asalanka 2/11 (5 overs)

Sri Lanka won by 65 runs
Bangladesh Krira Shikkha Protisthan Ground (Ground 2), Savar
Umpires: Nigel Duguid (WI) and Enamul Haque (Ban)

- Nepal won the toss and elected to field.
- Match reduced to 45 overs per side due to fog.

25 January
09:00
Scorecard

Ireland; 197 (45.1 overs)	v	Canada; 198/6 (45.4 overs)
Jack Tector 83 (106); Kurt Ramdath 5/24 (10 overs)		Abraash Khan 93* (98); Tom Stanton 2/46 (10 overs)

Canada won by 4 wickets
Bangladesh Krira Shikkha Protisthan Ground (Ground 3), Savar
Umpires: Adrian Holdstock (SA) and Raveendra Wimalasiri (SL)

- Ireland won the toss and elected to bat.
- Match reduced to 47 overs per side due to fog.

25 January
09:00
Scorecard

Pakistan; 197 (44.1 overs)	v	India; 198/5 (33.4 overs)
Mohammad Umar 36 (55); Khaleel Ahmed 5/30 (8 overs)		Sarfaraz Khan 81 (68); Hasan Mohsin 2/23 (4 overs)

India won by 5 wickets
Bangladesh Krira Shikkha Protisthan Ground (Ground 4), Savar
Umpires: Gregory Brathwaite (WI) and Ruchira Palliyaguruge (SL)

- Pakistan won the toss and elected to bat.
- Match reduced to 45 overs per side due to fog.

25 January
09:00
Scorecard

Namibia; 120 (39.5 overs)	v	Zimbabwe; 121/2 (22.2 overs)
SJ Loftie-Eaton 38 (68); Blessing Mavuta 6/18 (10 overs)		Shaun Snyder 60* (62); Motjaritje Honga 2/4 (1 over)

Zimbabwe won by 8 wickets
MA Aziz Stadium, Chittagong
Umpires: Tim Robinson (Eng) and Ahsan Raza (Pak)

- Namibia won the toss and elected to bat.

25 January
09:00
Scorecard

Bangladesh; 246/8 (50 overs)	v	England; 149 (48.1 overs)
Shafiul Hayet 68 (89); Brad Taylor 2/25 (10 overs)		Brad Taylor 41 (52); Mehedi Hasan 3/12 (8 overs)

Bangladesh won by 97 runs
Zahur Ahmed Chowdhury Stadium, Chittagong
Umpires: Phil Jones (NZ) and Chettithody Shamshuddin (Ind)

- Bangladesh won the toss and elected to bat.

== Group stage ==
=== Group A ===
Pos	Team	Pld	W	L	T	NR	Pts	NRR
1	Bangladesh	3	3	0	0	0	6	2.151
2	Namibia	3	2	1	0	0	4	0.035
3	South Africa	3	1	2	0	0	2	−0.027
4	Scotland	3	0	3	0	0	0	−2.356

27 January
09:00
Scorecard

Bangladesh; 240/7 (50 overs)	v	South Africa; 197 (48.4 overs)
Najmul Hossain Shanto 73 (82); Wiaan Mulder 3/42 (9 overs)		Liam Smith 100 (146); Mehedi Hasan 3/37 (9.4 overs)

Bangladesh won by 43 runs
Zahur Ahmed Chowdhury Stadium, Chittagong
Umpires: Chettithody Shamshuddin (Ind) and Tim Robinson (Eng)
Player of the match: Najmul Hossain Shanto (Ban)

- Bangladesh won the toss and elected to bat.

29 January
09:00
Scorecard

Scotland; 159 (36.3 overs)	v	Namibia; 162/1 (26 overs)
Owais Shah 39 (49); Michael van Lingen 3/19 (8 overs)		SJ Loftie-Eaton 67* (78); Haris Aslam 1/23 (5 overs)

Namibia won by 9 wickets
Sheikh Kamal International Stadium, Cox's Bazar
Umpires: Nigel Duguid (WI) and Ahmed Shahab (Pak)
Player of the match: SJ Loftie-Eaton (Nam)

- Scotland won the toss and elected to bat

31 January
09:00
Scorecard

Bangladesh; 256/6 (50 overs)	v	Scotland; 142 (47.2 overs)
Najmul Hossain Shanto 113* (117); Mohammad Ghaffar 4/60 (10 overs)		Azeem Dar 50 (89); Saleh Ahmed Shawon 3/27 (10 overs)

Bangladesh won by 114 runs
Sheikh Kamal International Stadium, Cox's Bazar
Umpires: Langton Rusere (Zim) and Ahmed Shahab (Pak)
Player of the match: Najmul Hossain Shanto (Ban)

- Scotland won the toss and elected to field.

31 January
09:00
Scorecard

South Africa; 136/9 (50 overs)	v	Namibia; 137/8 (39.4 overs)
Willem Ludick 42 (98); Michael van Lingen 4/24 (10 overs)		Lo-handre Louwrens 58* (97); Ziyaad Abrahams 2/18 (8.4 overs)

Namibia won by 2 wickets
Sheikh Kamal International Stadium (Academy Ground), Cox's Bazar
Umpires: Nigel Duguid (WI) and Enamul Haque (Ban)
Player of the match: Michael van Lingen (Nam)

- South Africa won the toss and elected to bat.

2 February
09:00
Scorecard

Namibia; 65 (32.5 overs)	v	Bangladesh; 66/2 (16 overs)
Niko Davin 19 (32); Ariful Islam 2/9 (5 overs)		Joyraz Sheik 34* (55); Fritz Coetzee 2/20 (6 overs)

Bangladesh won by 8 wickets
Sheikh Kamal International Stadium, Cox's Bazar
Umpires: Nigel Duguid (WI) and Langton Rusere (Zim)
Player of the match: Saleh Ahmed (Ban)

- Bangladesh won the toss and elected to field.

2 February
09:00
Scorecard

Scotland; 127 (45.4 overs)	v	South Africa; 129/0 (29 overs)
Harris Carnegie 29* (48); Wiaan Mulder 2/16 (6 overs)		Liam Smith 64* (87); Kyle Verreynne 64* (87)

South Africa won by 10 wickets
Sheikh Kamal International Stadium (Academy Ground), Cox's Bazar
Umpires: Ahmed Shahab (Pak) and Enamul Haque (Ban)
Player of the match: Kyle Verreynne (SA)

- South Africa won the toss and elected to field.

=== Group B ===
Pos	Team	Pld	W	L	T	NR	Pts	NRR
1	Pakistan	3	3	0	0	0	6	0.972
2	Sri Lanka	3	2	1	0	0	4	1.373
3	Afghanistan	3	1	2	0	0	2	−0.067
4	Canada	3	0	3	0	0	0	−2.640

28 January
09:30
Scorecard

Afghanistan; 126 (41.2 overs)	v	Pakistan; 129/4 (31.3 overs)
Tariq Stanikzai 53 (79); Shadab Khan 4/9 (5 overs)		Zeeshan Malik 29 (37); Zia-ur-Rehman 2/31 (10 overs)

Pakistan won by 6 wickets
Sylhet International Cricket Stadium, Sylhet
Umpires: Raveendra Wimalasiri (SL) and Ian Ramage (Sco)
Player of the match: Hasan Mohsin (Pak)

- Pakistan won the toss and elected to field.

28 January
09:00
Scorecard

Sri Lanka; 315/6 (50 overs)	v	Canada; 119 (39.2 overs)
Charith Asalanka 76 (69); Abdul Haseeb 2/65 (9 overs)		Arslan Khan 42 (71); Damitha Silva 2/16 (6 overs)

Sri Lanka won by 196 runs
Sylhet District Stadium, Sylhet
Umpires: Jeremiah Matibiri (Zim) and Anisur Rahman (Ban)
Player of the match: Charith Asalanka (SL)

- Sri Lanka won the toss and elected to bat.

30 January
09:00
Scorecard

Sri Lanka; 184 (48.1 overs)	v	Afghanistan; 151 (44.5 overs)
Charith Asalanka 71 (91); Shamsurrahman 3/19 (10 overs)		Waheedullah Shafaq 47 (47); Kamindu Mendis 3/36 (8 overs)

Sri Lanka won by 33 runs
Sylhet International Cricket Stadium, Sylhet
Umpires: Jeremiah Matibiri (Zim) and Ian Ramage (Sco)
Player of the match: Charith Asalanka (SL)

- Sri Lanka won the toss and elected to bat.

30 January
09:00
Scorecard

Canada; 178 (48.3 overs)	v	Pakistan; 180/3 (40.5 overs)
Bhavindu Adhihetty 51 (68); Hassan Khan 3/36 (10 overs)		Zeeshan Malik 89* (122); Suliman Khan 1/23 (6 overs)

Pakistan won by 7 wickets
Sylhet District Stadium, Sylhet
Umpires: Raveendra Wimalasiri (SL) and Anisur Rahman (Ban)
Player of the match: Zeeshan Malik (Pak)

- Canada won the toss and elected to bat.

1 February
09:00
Scorecard

Canada; 147 (50 overs)	v	Afghanistan; 149/6 (24.1 overs)
Arslan Khan 38 (52); Shamsurrahman 3/21 (8 overs)		Tariq Stanikzai 56 (48); Miraj Patel 3/17 (3.1 overs)

Afghanistan won by 4 wickets
Sylhet International Cricket Stadium, Sylhet
Umpires: Ian Ramage (Sco) and Anisur Rahman (Ban)
Player of the match: Tariq Stanikzai (Afg)

- Canada won the toss and elected to bat.

3 February
09:00
Scorecard

Pakistan; 212 (48.4 overs)	v	Sri Lanka; 189 (46.4 overs)
Hasan Mohsin 86 (86); Wanindu Hasaranga 2/30 (10 overs)		Kamindu Mendis 68 (104); Shadab Khan 3/31 (8.4 overs)

Pakistan won by 23 runs
Sher-e-Bangla National Cricket Stadium, Dhaka
Umpires: Gregory Brathwaite (WI) and Sharfuddoula (Ban)
Player of the match: Hasan Mohsin (Pak)

- Sri Lanka won the toss and elected to field.

=== Group C ===
Pos	Team	Pld	W	L	T	NR	Pts	NRR
1	England	3	3	0	0	0	6	3.260
2	West Indies	3	2	1	0	0	4	1.353
3	Zimbabwe	3	1	2	0	0	2	−0.037
4	Fiji	3	0	3	0	0	0	−5.150

27 January
09:00
Scorecard

England; 371/3 (50 overs)	v	Fiji; 72 (27.3 overs)
Daniel Lawrence 174 (150); Cakacaka Tikoisuva 1/59 (8 overs)		Peni Vuniwaqa 36 (74); Saqib Mahmood 3/2 (5 overs)

England won by 299 runs
M. A. Aziz Stadium, Chittagong
Umpires: Mick Martell (Aus) and Ahsan Raza (Pak)
Player of the match: Daniel Lawrence (Eng)

- England won the toss and elected to bat.

29 January
09:00
Scorecard

England; 282/7 (50 overs)	v	West Indies; 221 (43.4 overs)
Callum Taylor 59 (67); Gidron Pope 2/45 (9 overs)		Keemo Paul 65 (58); Saqib Mahmood 4/42 (8.4 overs)

England won by 61 runs
Zahur Ahmed Chowdhury Stadium, Chittagong
Umpires: Phil Jones (NZ) and Ahsan Raza (Pak)
Player of the match: Daniel Lawrence (Eng)

- England won the toss and elected to bat

29 January
09:00
Scorecard

Fiji; 81 (27.4 overs)	v	Zimbabwe; 84/3 (18.5 overs)
Cakacaka Tikoisuva 19 (39); Wesley Madhevere 5/24 (9.4 overs)		Brendan Sly 29* (44); Josaia Baleicikoibia 2/19 (4.5 overs)

Zimbabwe won by 7 wickets
M. A. Aziz Stadium, Chittagong
Umpires: Tim Robinson (Eng) and Mick Martell (Aus)
Player of the match: Wesley Madhevere (Zim)

- Fiji won the toss and elected to bat.

31 January
09:00
Scorecard

England; 288/4 (50 overs)	v	Zimbabwe; 159 (43.4 overs)
Jack Burnham 106* (104); Rugare Magarira 2/36 (10 overs)		Jeremy Ives 91 (132); Saqib Mahmood 4/39 (9.4 overs)

England won by 129 runs
Zahur Ahmed Chowdhury Stadium, Chittagong
Umpires: Mick Martell (Aus) and Chettithody Shamshuddin (Ind)
Player of the match: Jack Burnham (Eng)

- England won the toss and elected to bat.

31 January
09:00
Scorecard

West Indies; 340/7 (50 overs)	v	Fiji; 78 (27.3 overs)
Shamar Springer 106 (78); Cakacaka Tikoisuva 6/59 (10 overs)		Peni Vuniwaqa 29 (49); Gidron Pope 4/24 (7 overs)

West Indies won by 262 runs
M. A. Aziz Stadium, Chittagong
Umpires: Phil Jones (NZ) and Tim Robinson (Eng)
Player of the match: Gidron Pope (Win)

- Fiji won the toss and elected to field.

2 February
09:00
Scorecard

West Indies; 226/9 (50 overs)	v	Zimbabwe; 224 (49 overs)
Shamar Springer 61 (71); Rugare Magarira 3/28 (10 overs)		Shaun Snyder 52 (71); Alzarri Joseph 4/30 (10 overs)

West Indies won by 2 runs
Zahur Ahmed Chowdhury Stadium, Chittagong
Umpires: Phil Jones (NZ) and Ahsan Raza (Pak)
Player of the match: Alzarri Joseph (WI)

- Zimbabwe won the toss and elected to field.

=== Group D ===
Pos	Team	Pld	W	L	T	NR	Pts	NRR
1	India	3	3	0	0	0	6	2.581
2	Nepal	3	2	1	0	0	4	0.032
3	New Zealand	3	1	2	0	0	2	−0.810
4	Ireland	3	0	3	0	0	0	−1.705

28 January
09:00
Scorecard

India; 268/9 (50 overs)	v	Ireland; 189 (49.1 overs)
Sarfaraz Khan 73 (70); Rory Anders 3/35 (10 overs)		William McClintock 58 (86); Rahul Batham 3/15 (8 overs)

India won by 79 runs
Sher-e-Bangla National Cricket Stadium, Dhaka
Umpires: Adrian Holdstock (SA) and Ruchira Palliyaguruge (SL)
Player of the match: Sarfaraz Khan (Ind)

- Ireland won the toss and elected to field.

28 January
09:00
Scorecard

Nepal; 238/7 (50 overs)	v	New Zealand; 206 (47.1 overs)
Raju Rijal 48 (65); Nathan Smith 3/58 (10 overs)		Glenn Phillips 52 (68); Dipendra Airee 3/24 (5 overs)

Nepal won by 32 runs
Khan Shaheb Osman Ali Stadium, Fatullah
Umpires: Rob Bailey (Eng) and Sharfuddoula (Ban)
Player of the match: Raju Rijal (Nep)

- New Zealand won the toss and elected to field.

30 January
09:00
Scorecard

Ireland; 131/9 (50 overs)	v	Nepal; 132/2 (25.3 overs)
Harry Tector 30* (54); Sandeep Lamichhane 5/27 (10 overs)		Yogendra Singh Karki 61* (81); Josh Little 1/17 (5 overs)

Nepal won by 8 wickets
Khan Shaheb Osman Ali Stadium, Fatullah
Umpires: Adrian Holdstock (SA) and Sharfuddoula (Ban)
Player of the match: Sandeep Lamichhane (Nep)

- Ireland won the toss and elected to bat.
- Sandeep Lamichhane (Nep) took a hat-trick in this match.

30 January
09:00
Scorecard

India; 258/8 (50 overs)	v	New Zealand; 138 (31.3 overs)
Sarfaraz Khan 74 (80); Zak Gibson 3/50 (10 overs)		Christian Leopard 40 (40); Mahipal Lomror 5/47 (7.3 overs)

India won by 120 runs
Sher-e-Bangla National Cricket Stadium, Dhaka
Umpires: Rob Bailey (Eng) and Gregory Brathwaite (WI)
Player of the match: Avesh Khan (Ind)

- New Zealand won the toss and elected to field.

1 February
09:00
Scorecard

Ireland; 212 (47.5 overs)	v	New Zealand; 213/6 (40.1 overs)
Jack Tector 56 (83); Josh Finnie 3/30 (7 overs)		Finn Allen 97 (76); Rory Anders 4/32 (10 overs)

New Zealand won by 4 wickets
Khan Shaheb Osman Ali Stadium, Fatullah
Umpires: Adrian Holdstock (SA) and Gregory Brathwaite (WI)
Player of the match: Finn Allen (NZ)

- New Zealand won the toss and elected to field.
- The match was reduced to 48 overs per side due to fog.

1 February
09:00
Scorecard

Nepal; 169/8 (48 overs)	v	India; 175/3 (18.1 overs)
Sandeep Sunar 37 (73); Avesh Khan 3/34 (8 overs)		Rishabh Pant 78 (24); Prem Tamang 2/41 (6 overs)

India won by 7 wickets
Sher-e-Bangla National Cricket Stadium, Dhaka
Umpires: Rob Bailey (Ind) and Ruchira Palliyaguruge (SL)
Player of the match: Rishabh Pant (Ind)

- India won the toss and elected to field.
- The match was reduced to 48 overs per side due to fog.
- Rishabh Pant (Ind) scored the fastest 50 in U19 cricket.

== Plate League ==
9th place play-off quarter-finals
4 Feb
Ireland	185/7
South Africa	187/2
5 Feb
Canada	186/8
Zimbabwe	190/4
4 Feb
Scotland	181/9
New Zealand	185/3
5 Feb
Afghanistan	340/9
Fiji	114

9th place play-off semi-finals
8 Feb
South Africa	91
Zimbabwe	94/2
9 Feb
New Zealand	135
Afghanistan	137/2

9th place play-off
12 Feb
Zimbabwe	216/9
Afghanistan	218/5
11th place play-off
12 Feb
South Africa	288/6
New Zealand	150

Quarter-finals

13th place play-off semi-finals
7 Feb
Canada	139
Ireland	142/4
8 Feb
Scotland	225
Fiji	149

13th place play-off
10 Feb
Ireland	235/7
Scotland	140
15th place play-off
11 Feb
Fiji	83
Canada	84/2

=== Plate quarter-finals ===
4 February
09:00
Scorecard

Ireland; 185/7 (50 overs)	v	South Africa; 187/2 (46 overs)
Lorcan Tucker 77* (98); Dayyaan Galiem 2/22 (10 overs)		Kyle Verreynne 77 (109); Adam Dennison 1/27 (8 overs)

South Africa won by 8 wickets
Sheikh Kamal International Stadium, Cox's Bazar
Umpires: Phil Jones (NZ) and Ian Ramage (Sco)
Player of the match: Kyle Verreynne (SA)

- Ireland won the toss and elected to bat.

4 February
09:00
Scorecard

Scotland; 181/9 (50 overs)	v	New Zealand; 185/3 (27 overs)
Owais Shah 32 (66); Ross ter Braak 3/34 (10 overs)		Glenn Philips 89 (40); Haris Aslam 2/37 (8 overs)

New Zealand won by 7 wickets
Sheikh Kamal International Stadium (Academy Ground), Cox's Bazar
Umpires: Nigel Duguid (WI) and Ahmed Shahab (Pak)
Player of the match: Glenn Philips (NZ)

- Scotland won the toss and elected to bat.

5 February
09:00
Scorecard

Afghanistan; 340/9 (50 overs)	v	Fiji; 114 (31.2 overs)
Karim Janat 156 (132); Peni Vuniwaqa 3/41 (6 overs)		Josaia Baleicikoibia 29 (40); Nijat Masood 3/6 (6 overs)

Afghanistan won by 226 runs
Sheikh Kamal International Stadium, Cox's Bazar
Umpires: Jeremiah Matibiri (Zim) and Enamul Haque (Ban)
Player of the match: Karim Janat (Afg)

- Fiji won the toss and elected to field.

5 February
09:00
Scorecard

Canada; 186/8 (50 overs)	v	Zimbabwe; 190/4 (31.4 overs)
Amish Taploo 37 (71); Jeremy Ives 3/30 (10 overs)		Shaun Snyder 56 (42); Bhavindu Adhihetty 2/23 (8 overs)

Zimbabwe won by 6 wickets
Sheikh Kamal International Stadium (Academy Ground), Cox's Bazar
Umpires: Raveendra Wimalasiri (SL) and Sharfuddoula (Ban)
Player of the match: Jeremy Ives (Zim)

- Canada won the toss and elected to bat.

=== Plate semi-finals ===
8 February
09:00
Scorecard

South Africa; 91 (39.5 overs)	v	Zimbabwe; 94/2 (22 overs)
Rivaldo Moonsamy 32 (46); Richard Ngarava 4/10 (9 overs)		Jeremy Ives 34* (54); Wiaan Mulder 1/10 (4 overs)

Zimbabwe won by 8 wickets
Sheikh Kamal International Stadium, Cox's Bazar
Umpires: Phil Jones (NZ) and Sharfuddoula (Ban)
Player of the match: Richard Ngarava (Zim)

- Zimbabwe won the toss and elected to field.

9 February
09:00
Scorecard

New Zealand; 135 (44.5 overs)	v	Afghanistan; 137/2 (27.3 overs)
Aniket Parikh 48 (54); Rashid Khan 3/30 (10 overs)		Tariq Stanikzai 50* (86); Aniket Parikh 2/50 (10 overs)

Afghanistan won by 8 wickets
Sheikh Kamal International Stadium (Academy Ground), Cox's Bazar
Umpires: Nigel Duguid (WI) and Ian Ramage (Sco)
Player of the match: Tariq Stanikzai (Afg)

- New Zealand won the toss and elected to bat.

=== Plate final ===
12 February
09:00
Scorecard

Zimbabwe; 216/9 (50 overs)	v	Afghanistan; 218/5 (46.5 overs)
William Mashinge 66 (92); Zia-ur-Rehman 3/33 (10 overs)		Tariq Stanikzai 106* (142); Jeremy Ives 2/36 (4.5 overs)

Afghanistan won by 5 wickets
Sheikh Kamal International Stadium, Cox's Bazar
Umpires: Phil Jones (NZ) and Ian Ramage (Sco)
Player of the match: Tariq Stanikzai (Afg)

- Zimbabwe won the toss and elected to bat.

== Super League ==
Quarter-finals
5 Feb
Nepal	211/9
Bangladesh	215/4
8 Feb
Pakistan	227/6
West Indies	229/5
6 Feb
Namibia	152
India	349/6
7 Feb
England	184
Sri Lanka	186/4

Semi-finals
11 Feb
Bangladesh	226
West Indies	230/7
9 Feb
India	267/9
Sri Lanka	170

Final
14 Feb
West Indies	146/5
India	145
3rd place play-off
13 Feb
Bangladesh	218/7
Sri Lanka	214

Quarter-finals

5th place play-off semi-finals
10 Feb
England	286/9
Namibia	83
9 Feb
Pakistan	258/8
Nepal	136

5th place play-off
12 Feb
England	264/7
Pakistan	265/3
7th place play-off
11 Feb
Namibia	225/9
Nepal	210

=== Quarter-finals ===
5 February
09:00
Scorecard

Nepal; 211/9 (50 overs)	v	Bangladesh; 215/4 (48.2 overs)
Raju Rijal 75 (80); Mohammad Saifuddin 2/38 (10 overs)		Zakir Hasan 75* (77); Sunil Dhamala 2/33 (10 overs)

Bangladesh won by 6 wickets
Sher-e-Bangla National Cricket Stadium, Dhaka
Umpires: Rob Bailey (Eng) and Ruchira Palliyaguruge (SL)
Player of the match: Mehedi Hasan (Ban)

- Nepal won the toss and elected to bat.

6 February
09:00
Scorecard

India; 349/6 (50 overs)	v	Namibia; 152 (39 overs)
Rishabh Pant 111 (96); Fritz Coetzee 3/78 (10 overs)		Niko Davin 33 (30); Mayank Dagar 3/25 (10 overs)

India won by 197 runs
Khan Shaheb Osman Ali Stadium, Fatullah
Umpires: Mick Martell (Aus) and Ahsan Raza (Pak)
Player of the match: Rishabh Pant (Ind)

- India won the toss and elected to bat.

7 February
09:00
Scorecard

England; 184 (49.2 overs)	v	Sri Lanka; 186/4 (35.4 overs)
Callum Taylor 42 (57); Wanindu Hasaranga 3/34 (10 overs)		Avishka Fernando 95 (96); Daniel Lawrence 1/33 (10 overs)

Sri Lanka won by 6 wickets
Sher-e-Bangla National Cricket Stadium, Dhaka
Umpires: Adrian Holdstock (SA) and Gregory Brathwaite (WI)
Player of the match: Avishka Fernando (SL)

- England won the toss and elected to bat.

8 February
09:00
Scorecard

Pakistan; 227/6 (50 overs)	v	West Indies; 229/5 (40 overs)
Umair Masood 113(113); Chemar Holder 2/26 (7 overs)		Tevin Imlach 54 (76); Ahmad Shafiq 1/35 (7 overs)

West Indies won by 5 wickets
Khan Shaheb Osman Ali Stadium, Fatullah
Umpires: Chettithody Shamshuddin (Ind) and Tim Robinson (Eng)
Player of the match: Umair Masood (Pak)

- Pakistan won the toss and elected to bat.

=== Semi-finals ===
9 February
09:00
Scorecard

India; 267/9 (50 overs)	v	Sri Lanka; 170 (42.4 overs)
Anmolpreet Singh 72 (92); Asitha Fernando 4/43 (10 overs)		Kamindu Mendis 39 (67); Mayank Dagar 3/21 (5.4 overs)

India won by 97 runs
Sher-e-Bangla National Cricket Stadium, Dhaka
Umpires: Gregory Brathwaite (WI) and Mick Martell (Aus)
Player of the match: Anmolpreet Singh (Ind)

- Sri Lanka won the toss and elected to field.

11 February
09:00
Scorecard

Bangladesh; 226 (50 overs)	v	West Indies; 230/7 (48.4 overs)
Mehedi Hasan 60 (74); Keemo Paul 3/20 (3 overs)		Shamar Springer 62* (88); Saleh Ahmed Shawon 3/37 (10 overs)

West Indies won by 3 wickets
Sher-e-Bangla National Cricket Stadium, Dhaka
Umpires: Rob Bailey (Eng) and Ruchira Palliyaguruge (SL)
Player of the match: Shamar Springer (WI)

- Bangladesh won the toss and elected to bat.

=== Final ===
14 February
09:00
Scorecard

India; 145 (45.1 overs)	v	West Indies; 146/5 (49.3 overs)
Sarfaraz Khan 51 (89); Ryan John 3/38 (10 overs)		Keacy Carty 52* (125); Mayank Dagar 3/25 (10 overs)

West Indies won by 5 wickets
Sher-e-Bangla National Cricket Stadium, Dhaka
Umpires: Rob Bailey (Eng) and Ruchira Palliyaguruge (SL)
Player of the match: Keacy Carty (WI)

- West Indies won the toss and elected to field.
- Sarfaraz Khan (Ind) became the most (7) 50+ scorer in the tournament history.
- The West Indies won their maiden title.

== Placement matches ==
=== Final ===
14 February
09:00
Scorecard

India; 145 (45.1 overs)	v	West Indies; 146/5 (49.3 overs)
Sarfaraz Khan 51 (89); Ryan John 3/38 (10 overs)		Keacy Carty 52* (125); Mayank Dagar 3/25 (10 overs)

West Indies won by 5 wickets
Sher-e-Bangla National Cricket Stadium, Dhaka
Umpires: Rob Bailey (Eng) and Ruchira Palliyaguruge (SL)
Player of the match: Keacy Carty (WI)

- West Indies won the toss and elected to field.
- Sarfaraz Khan (Ind) became the most (7) 50+ scorer in the tournament history.
- The West Indies won their maiden title.

=== 3rd-place playoff ===
13 February
09:00
Scorecard

Sri Lanka; 214 (48.5 overs)	v	Bangladesh; 218/7 (49.3 overs)
Charith Asalanka 76 (99); Mehedi Hasan 3/28 (10 overs)		Mehedi Hasan 53 (66); Shammu Ashan 2/39 (8 overs)

Bangladesh won by 3 wickets
Khan Shaheb Osman Ali Stadium, Fatullah
Umpires: Chettithody Shamshuddin (Ind) and Tim Robinson (Eng)
Player of the match: Mehedi Hasan (Ban)

- Sri Lanka won the toss and elected to bat.

=== 5th-place playoff semi-finals ===
9 February
09:00
Scorecard

Pakistan; 258/8 (50 overs)	v	Nepal; 136 (43.5 overs)
Hasan Mohsin 117 (106); Sandeep Lamichhane 3/53 (10 overs)		Prem Tamang 65* (91); Hasan Mohsin 4/42 (10 overs)

Pakistan won by 122 runs
Khan Shaheb Osman Ali Stadium, Fatullah
Umpires: Tim Robinson (Eng) and Rob Bailey (Eng)
Player of the match: Hasan Mohsin (Pak)

- Nepal won the toss and elected to field.

10 February
09:00
Scorecard

England; 286/9 (48 overs)	v	Namibia; 83 (25.2 overs)
Jack Burnham 109 (123); Fritz Coetzee 3/72 (10 overs)		Lo-handre Louwrens 24 (39); Mason Crane 3/3 (3.2 overs)

England won by 203 runs
Khan Shaheb Osman Ali Stadium, Fatullah
Umpires: Ruchira Palliyaguruge (SL) and Chettithody Shamshuddin (Ind)
Player of the match: Jack Burnham (Eng)

- Namibia won the toss and elected to field.
- The match was reduced to 48 overs per side due to fog.

=== 5th-place playoff ===
12 February
09:00
Scorecard

England; 264/7 (50 overs)	v	Pakistan; 265/3 (43.1 overs)
Sam Curran 83 (107); Saif Ali 2/37 (6 overs)		Zeeshan Malik 93 (105); George Garton 1/36 (6 overs)

Pakistan won by 7 wickets
Khan Shaheb Osman Ali Stadium, Fatullah
Umpires: Adrian Holdstock (SA) and Gregory Brathwaite (WI)
Player of the match: Zeeshan Malik (Pak)

- Pakistan won the toss and elected to field.

=== 7th-place playoff ===
11 February
09:00
Scorecard

Namibia; 225/9 (45 overs)	v	Nepal; 210 (44.2 overs)
Lo-handre Louwrens 59 (96); Sandeep Lamichhane 3/35 (9 overs)		Sunil Dhamala 59 (63); Michael van Lingen 4/24 (6.2 overs)

Namibia won by 15 runs
Khan Shaheb Osman Ali Stadium, Fatullah
Umpires: Adrian Holdstock (SA) and Ahsan Raza (Pak)
Player of the match: Michael van Lingen (Nam)

- Namibia won the toss and elected to bat.
- The match was reduced to 45 overs per side due to fog.

=== 11th-place playoff ===
12 February
09:00
Scorecard

South Africa; 288/6 (50 overs)	v	New Zealand; 150 (38.4 overs)
Dean Foxcroft 117 (137); Aniket Parikh 2/33 (10 overs)		Finn Allen 40 (49); Wiaan Mulder 4/14 (7.4 overs)

South Africa won by 138 runs
Sheikh Kamal International Stadium (Academy Ground), Cox's Bazar
Umpires: Nigel Duguid (WI) and Ahmed Shahab (Pak)
Player of the match: Dean Foxcroft (SA)

- New Zealand won the toss and elected to field.

=== 13th-place playoff semi-finals ===
7 February
09:00
Scorecard

Canada; 139 (48.2 overs)	v	Ireland; 142/4 (34.3 overs)
Arslan Khan 47 (88); Rory Anders 4/21 (10 overs)		Stephen Doheny 33 (49); Bhavindu Adhihetty 3/25 (7.3 overs)

Ireland won by 6 wickets
Sheikh Kamal International Stadium, Cox's Bazar
Umpires: Langton Rusere (Zim) and Anisur Rahman (Ban)
Player of the match: Gary McClintock (Ire)

- Ireland won the toss and elected to field.

8 February
09:00
Scorecard

Scotland; 225 (48.1 overs)	v	Fiji; 149 (42.2 overs)
Finlay McCreath 60 (82); Cakacaka Tikoisuva 4/46 (9 overs)		Peni Vuniwaqa 80 (123); Cameron Sloman 3/34 (8 overs)

Scotland won by 76 runs
Sheikh Kamal International Stadium (Academy Ground), Cox's Bazar
Umpires: Raveendra Wimalasiri (SL) and Ahmed Shahab (Pak)
Player of the match: Finlay McCreath (Sco)

- Fiji won the toss and elected to field.

=== 13th-place playoff ===
10 February
09:00
Scorecard

Ireland; 235/7 (50 overs)	v	Scotland; 140 (44 overs)
William McClintock 69 (45); Mohammad Ghaffar 3/49 (10 overs)		Neil Flack 19(26); Harry Tector 4/28 (10 overs)

Ireland won by 95 runs
Sheikh Kamal International Stadium, Cox's Bazar
Umpires: Anisur Rahman (Ban) and Enamul Haque (Ban)
Player of the match: William McClintock (Ire)

- Scotland won the toss and elected to field.

=== 15th-place playoff ===
11 February
09:00
Scorecard

Fiji; 83 (28 overs)	v	Canada; 84/2 (20 overs)
Delaimatuku Maraiwai 14 (24); Miraj Patel 4/16 (4 overs)		Akash Gill 38* (65); Sosiceni Weleilakeba 1/5 (2 overs)

Canada won by 8 wickets
Sheikh Kamal International Stadium (Academy Ground), Cox's Bazar
Umpires: Jeremiah Matibiri (Zim) and Langton Rusere (Zim)
Player of the match: Miraj Patel (Can)

- Canada won the toss and elected to field.

== Final standings ==
Pos.	Team	Remarks
1	West Indies	Qualified for 2018 World Cup as full member of ICC
2	India	Qualified for 2018 World Cup as full member of ICC
3	Bangladesh	Qualified for 2018 World Cup as full member of ICC
4	Sri Lanka	Qualified for 2018 World Cup as full member of ICC
5	Pakistan	Qualified for 2018 World Cup as full member of ICC
6	England	Qualified for 2018 World Cup as full member of ICC
7	Namibia	Qualified for 2018 World Cup as top associate team
8	Nepal	
9	Afghanistan	
10	Zimbabwe	Qualified for 2018 World Cup as full member of ICC
11	South Africa	Qualified for 2018 World Cup as full member of ICC
12	New Zealand	Qualified for 2018 World Cup as full member of ICC
13	Ireland	
14	Scotland	
15	Canada	
16	Fiji	
