= Rugare Magarira =

Zimbabwean cricketer (born 1997)

Personal information
- Born: 27 April 1997 (age 29)
- Source: ESPNcricinfo, 9 September 2016

Rugare Magarira (born 27 April 1997) is a Zimbabwean cricketer. He made his Twenty20 debut for Zimbabwe against Free State in the 2016 Africa T20 Cup on 9 September 2016. Prior to his Twenty20 debut, he was part of Zimbabwe's squad for the 2016 Under-19 Cricket World Cup.

He made his first-class debut for Rising Stars in the 2017–18 Logan Cup on 12 November 2017, taking five wickets for 58 runs in the first innings. He made his List A debut for Rising Stars in the 2017–18 Pro50 Championship on 29 April 2018. On 25 May 2018, during the tournament, he took seven wickets for nineteen runs against the Matabeleland Tuskers, with the Rising Stars winning the match by eight wickets.

In June 2018, he was named in a Zimbabwe Select team for warm-up fixtures ahead of the 2018 Zimbabwe Tri-Nation Series. Later the same month, he was named in a 22-man preliminary Twenty20 International (T20I) squad for the tri-nation series. In September 2018, he was named in Zimbabwe's squad for the 2018 Africa T20 Cup tournament.
