= SJ Loftie-Eaton =

Namibian cricketer (born 1996)

Personal information
- Full name: Sybrand Jacobus Loftie-Eaton
- Born: 11 October 1996 (age 30); Namibia

International information
- National side: Namibia (2014–)
- Source: Cricinfo, 9 January 2016

Sybrand Jacobus "SJ" Loftie-Eaton (born 11 October 1996) is a Namibian cricketer. He made his first-class debut on 6 February 2014 in the CSA Provincial Three-Day Competition tournament. In January 2016 he was named in Namibia's squad for the 2016 Under-19 Cricket World Cup.
