= Saif Ali =

Pakistani cricketer (born 1997)

Personal information
- Born: 27 October 1997 (age 29); Karachi, Pakistan
- Source: Cricinfo, 26 September 2017

Saif Ali (born 27 October 1997) is a Pakistani cricketer. He made his first-class debut for National Bank of Pakistan in the 2017–18 Quaid-e-Azam Trophy on 26 September 2017. Prior to his first-class debut, he was named in Pakistan's squad for the 2016 Under-19 Cricket World Cup.

He made his List A debut for National Bank of Pakistan in the 2017–18 Departmental One Day Cup on 3 January 2018.
