= Donald Samunderu =

Zimbabwean cricketer (born 1987)

Kudakwashe Donald Samunderu
Personal information
- Full name: Kudakwashe Donald Samunderu
- Born: 12 July 1987 (age 39); Harare, Zimbabwe
- Batting: Right-handed
- Bowling: Right-arm off break

Domestic team information
- Years: Team
- 2004/05: Mashonaland
- 2017/18: Harare Metropolitan Eagles

Career statistics
Competition	First-class	List A
Matches	8	8
Runs scored	290	125
Batting average	20.71	15.62
100s/50s	0/2	0/0
Top score	67	43
Balls bowled	144	132
Wickets	0	7
Bowling average	–	12.71
5 wickets in innings	–	0
10 wickets in match	–	0
Best bowling	–	3/32
Catches/stumpings	4/–	4/–
- Source: Cricinfo, 28 September 2024

Kudakwashe Donald Samunderu (born 12 July 1987) is a former Zimbabwean cricketer. He played 16 top-level matches in Zimbabwe between the 2004–05 season and 2017–18 as a batting all-rounder.

Born at Harare in 1987, Samunderu made his first-class and List A debuts for the Mashonaland cricket team at the beginning of the 2004–05 Zimbabwean season. In early 2005 he played two first-class and one List A match for the Zimbabwe A cricket team against Bangladesh A cricket team on their tour of Zimbabwe, having impressed as an opening batsman in a trial match against a Zimbabwe Board XI earlier in the season aged only 17. The following season he played for the national under-19 side, first in the Afro-Asia under-19 cup competition, before playing in the 2006 Under-19 Cricket World Cup in Sri Lanka.

Despite a number of impressive batting performances for the under-19 side, Samunderu did not play senior domestic cricket again until the 2017–18 season. He played club cricket in England, for Durbanville in South Africa, and for Bangor Cricket Club in Ireland, before reappearing in top-level cricket for Harare Metropolitan Eagles, playing five List A matches and a single Logan Cup match for the side in April and May 2018.

Samunderu studied at the University of the Western Cape in South Africa, graduating with a master's degree in Sport for Development. He established a non-profit organisation to manage and evaluate the development of sports coaching programmes in the Western Cape and has coached the university's cricket team. He is currently the head coach of Kjøbenhavns Boldklub in Copenhagen, Denmark and is involved with various programs for Danish Cricket Federation.
