= Fritz Coetzee =

Namibian cricketer (born 1997)

Personal information
- Born: 4 June 1997 (age 29)
- Source: Cricinfo, 8 December 2016

Fritz Coetzee (born 4 June 1997) is a Namibian cricketer. He made his first-class debut for Namibia in the 2016–17 Sunfoil 3-Day Cup on 8 December 2016. Before his first-class debut, he was part of Namibia's squad for the 2016 Under-19 Cricket World Cup. He led the tournament in wickets, taking 15 wickets from 6 matches with a best of 3/16 against South Africa. In November 2016, he won the U19 Cricketer Award at Cricket Namibia's annual awards ceremony.
