= Jeremy Ives =

Zimbabwean cricketer (born 1996)

Personal information
- Born: 25 December 1996 (age 29)
- Source: ESPNcricinfo, 9 September 2016

Jeremy Ives (born 25 December 1996) is a Zimbabwean cricketer. He made his Twenty20 debut for Zimbabwe against Free State in the 2016 Africa T20 Cup on 9 September 2016. Prior to his Twenty20 debut, he was part of Zimbabwe's squad for the 2016 Under-19 Cricket World Cup.
