= Liam Smith (cricketer) =

South African cricketer (born 1997)

Personal information
- Full name: Liam Philip Smith
- Born: 11 May 1997 (age 29); Johannesburg, South Africa
- Batting: Right-handed

Domestic team information
- Years: Team
- 2017: Sussex
- Only First-class: 14 June 2017 Sussex v South Africa A

Career statistics
Competition	First-class
Matches	1
Runs scored	0
Batting average	0.00
100s/50s	0/0
Top score	0
Catches/stumpings	0/–
- Source: Cricinfo, 17 June 2017

Liam Philip Smith (born 11 May 1997) is a South African cricketer. He made his first-class debut for Sussex against South Africa A on 14 June 2017.

Prior to his first-class debut, he was named in South Africa's squad for the 2016 Under-19 Cricket World Cup. In the opening match of the tournament, he made a century against Bangladesh.
