= Jack Burnham (cricketer) =

English cricketer (born 1997)

Personal information
- Full name: Jack Tony Arthur Burnham
- Born: 18 January 1997 (age 29); Durham, County Durham, England
- Batting: Right-handed
- Bowling: Right-arm medium
- Role: Batsman

Domestic team information
- Years: Team
- 2015–2021: Durham (squad no. 8)
- First-class debut: 7 August 2015 Durham v Yorkshire
- List A debut: 15 June 2016 Durham v Nottinghamshire

Career statistics
Competition	FC	LA	T20
Matches	52	13	26
Runs scored	2,045	139	194
Batting average	25.56	23.16	10.21
100s/50s	2/11	0/0	0/1
Top score	135	45	53*
Balls bowled	61	–	1
Wickets	0	–	0
Bowling average	–	–	–
5 wickets in innings	–	–	–
10 wickets in match	–	–	–
Best bowling	–	–	–
Catches/stumpings	17/–	4/–	10/–
- Source: ESPNcricinfo, 25 September 2021

Jack Tony Arthur Burnham (born 18 January 1997) is an English cricketer who previously played for Durham County Cricket Club. Primarily a right-handed batsman, he also bowls right-arm medium. In December 2015, he was named in England's squad for the 2016 Under-19 Cricket World Cup. He was the top run-scorer in the tournament, with 420 runs. In October 2017, he was given a one-year ban from cricket after failing his third drugs test.
