= Zaheer Muhammad =

Zimbabwean cricketer (born 1997)

Personal information
- Full name: Muhammad Zaheer Tufail
- Born: 20 April 1997 (age 29)
- Source: Cricinfo, 25 May 2018

Zaheer Muhammad (born 20 April 1997) is a Zimbabwean cricketer. He made his List A debut for Mashonaland Eagles in the 2017–18 Pro50 Championship on 22 May 2018.
