= Sunil Dhamala =

Nepalese cricketer (born 1997)

Personal information
- Born: 11 January 1997 (age 29)
- Batting: Right-handed
- Bowling: Right-arm off break
- Role: Batsman

International information
- National side: Nepal
- Only ODI (cap 31): 9 June 2022 v Oman
- Source: ESPNcricinfo, 11 June 2022

Sunil Dhamala (born 11 January 1997) is a Nepalese cricketer. He made his List A debut for Nepal against Kenya in the 2015–17 ICC World Cricket League Championship on 11 March 2017. Prior to his List A debut, he was named in Nepal's squad for the 2016 Under-19 Cricket World Cup. In January 2018, he was named in Nepal's squad for the 2018 ICC World Cricket League Division Two tournament.

In May 2022, he was named in Nepal's One Day International (ODI) squad for round 13 of the 2019–2023 ICC Cricket World Cup League 2 in the United States. He made his ODI debut on 9 June 2022, for Nepal against Oman.
