= Rory Anders =

Irish cricketer (born 1997)

Personal information
- Full name: Rory J Anders
- Born: 10 December 1997 (age 28); Dublin, Ireland
- Batting: Right-handed
- Bowling: Right-arm fast-medium

Domestic team information
- Years: Team
- 2017: Munster Reds
- 2019–2022: Leinster Lightning
- List A debut: 22 September 2020 Leinster v North West
- Twenty20 debut: 26 May 2017 Munster v Northern

Career statistics
Competition	List A	T20
Matches	2	12
Runs scored	–	28
Batting average	–	4.66
100s/50s	–	0/0
Top score	–	10
Balls bowled	48	60
Wickets	0	3
Bowling average	–	28.66
5 wickets in innings	–	0
10 wickets in match	–	0
Best bowling	–	2/10
Catches/stumpings	0/–	5/–
- Source: Cricinfo, 5 June 2022

Rory J Anders (born 10 December 1997) is an Irish cricketer. He made his Twenty20 cricket debut for Munster Reds in the 2017 Inter-Provincial Trophy on 26 May 2017. Prior to his Twenty20 debut, he was part of Ireland's squad for the 2016 Under-19 Cricket World Cup. He made his List A debut for Leinster Lightning in the 2020 Inter-Provincial Cup on 22 September 2020.
