= Tom Stanton (cricketer) =

Irish cricketer (born 1997)

Personal information
- Full name: Tom Stanton
- Born: 21 September 1997 (age 29); Ireland
- Batting: Right-handed
- Bowling: Left-arm medium

Domestic team information
- Years: Team
- 2017–present: Leinster Lightning
- T20 debut: 9 June 2017 Leinster v Northern

Career statistics
Competition	Twenty20
Matches	3
Runs scored	–
Batting average	–
100s/50s	–
Top score	–
Balls bowled	60
Wickets	4
Bowling average	18.50
5 wickets in innings	0
10 wickets in match	0
Best bowling	2/30
Catches/stumpings	2/–
- Source: Cricinfo, 5 August 2025

Tom Stanton (born 21 September 1997) is an Irish cricketer. He made his Twenty20 cricket debut for Leinster Lightning in the 2017 Inter-Provincial Trophy on 9 June 2017. Prior to his T20 debut, he was part of Ireland's squad for the 2016 Under-19 Cricket World Cup.
