= Callum Taylor (English cricketer) =

English cricketer

Personal information
- Full name: Callum John James Taylor
- Born: 26 June 1997 (age 29); Norwich, Norfolk, England
- Batting: Right-handed
- Bowling: Right-arm medium

Domestic team information
- Years: Team
- 2015–2018: Essex
- FC debut: 18 May 2015 Essex v Glamorgan
- T20 debut: 15 May 2015 Essex v Hampshire

Career statistics
Competition	FC	T20
Matches	4	10
Runs scored	62	24
Batting average	10.33	4.80
100s/50s	0/0	0/0
Top score	26	14
Balls bowled	195	6
Wickets	6	0
Bowling average	21.50	–
5 wickets in innings	0	–
10 wickets in match	0	n/a
Best bowling	2/20	–
Catches/stumpings	2/–	1/–
- Source: CricketArchive, 30 March 2018

Callum John Taylor (born 26 June 1997) is an English cricketer who played for Essex County Cricket Club. Primarily a right-handed batsman, he also bowls right-arm medium. He made his Twenty20 debut for Essex against Hampshire in May 2015. In December 2015 he was named in England's squad for the 2016 Under-19 Cricket World Cup.
