= Shaheed Ria Gope Cricket Stadium =

Cricket ground

- Fatullah Stadium
- Interactive map of Shaheed Ria Gope Cricket Stadium

Ground information
- Location: Fatullah, Narayanganj
- Country: Bangladesh
- Coordinates: 23°39′0.58″N 90°29′19.72″E
- Capacity: 18,166 (Seating Capacity)
- Owner: National Sports Council
- Operator: Bangladesh Cricket Board
- Tenants: Bangladesh, Dhaka Division
- End names
- Press Box End; Pavilion End

International information
- First men's Test: 9–13 April 2006: Bangladesh v Australia
- Last men's Test: 10–14 June 2015: Bangladesh v India
- First men's ODI: 23 March 2006: Bangladesh v Kenya
- Last men's ODI: 1 March 2014: Bangladesh v Afghanistan
- First men's T20I: 19 Feb 2016: Afghanistan v United Arab Emirates
- Last men's T20I: 21 Feb 2016: Hong Kong v United Arab Emirates
- First women's ODI: 14 November 2011: South Africa v Sri Lanka
- Last women's ODI: 26 November 2011: South Africa v Sri Lanka
- As of 1 September 2020; Source: Narayanganj Osmani Stadium, Cricinfo

Shaheed Ria Gope Cricket Stadium (formerly known as Khan Shaheb Osman Ali Stadium) is a cricket stadium located in Fatullah, Narayanganj in central Bangladesh. It has a capacity of around 25,000 people and field dimensions of 181 m × 145 m (594 ft × 476 ft).

== History ==
The ground was used in 2004 for matches of the ICC Under-19 Cricket World Cup.

The stadium became a Test cricket venue on 9 April 2006, when it hosted a Test match between Australia and Bangladesh.

The stadium hosted two warm-up matches of 2011 Cricket World Cup. England played both warm-up matches against Canada and Pakistan here. The venue hosted the first round matches of 2014 Asia Cup. In Asia Cup 2014, Bangladesh became the first Test playing nation to lose an ODI against Afghanistan, falling short by 32 runs.

The stadium was also nominated as a practice match venue for 2014 ICC World Twenty20. In February 2016, The venue hosted four matches of 2016 Asia Cup Qualifier, of which the match played between Afghanistan and United Arab Emirates was the first Twenty20 International (T20I) match played at this venue.

The venue hosted its second test since its inauguration in 2006 when Indian cricket team toured Bangladesh in June 2015.

The venue has also hosted group stage matches of 2016 Under-19 Cricket World Cup matches.

In March 2025, the Khan Shaheb Osman Ali Stadium was renamed Shaheed Riya Gope Cricket Stadium.

== Outer Ground ==
The smaller ground next to Fatullah Osmani Stadium, the Khan Shaheb Osmani Ali Stadium Outer Ground, has been used for domestic first-class, List A and T20 cricket since 2013–14. The outer ground was first used for the 2016 Asia Cup Twenty20 International tournament qualifying round. The first match of the ground was held between Afghanistan and UAE on 19 February 2016.

== Renovation ==
The stadium and the outer stadium often remain idle as the venue used to get filled with drainage water and flooding during monsoon season, being situated on low-lying land. In October 2023, BCB at its expense started some renovation work by earth-filling and increasing the height of the playing surface up to 6 feet to avoid the water-logging problems so that domestic cricket could be continued all over the year. While major renovations of the venue is expected to be done by its owner, National Sports Council.

== See also ==
- List of Test cricket grounds
- List of stadiums in Asia
- 2011 Cricket World Cup
- Stadiums in Bangladesh
