= Raju Rijal =

Nepalese cricketer (born 1996)

Personal information
- Born: 26 September 1996 (age 30); Kailali, Nepal
- Batting: Right-handed
- Bowling: Right-arm off spin
- Role: Wicket-keeper

Career statistics
Competition	List A
Matches	3
Runs scored	9
Batting average	6.00
100s/50s	0/0
Top score	6
Catches/stumpings	2/4
- Source: ESPNcricinfo, 6 February 2019

Raju Rijal (born 26 September 1996) is a Nepalese cricketer. He made his List A debut in the 2015–17 ICC World Cricket League Championship on 16 April 2016 against Namibia.

Prior to his List A debut, he was named as the captain of Nepal's under-19 squad for the 2016 Under-19 Cricket World Cup. Initially there were some concerns about his eligibility, with reports stating he was over 19 years of age. However, the International Cricket Council (ICC) were satisfied that his date of birth was correct.

He made his first-class debut on 6 November 2019, for Nepal against the Marylebone Cricket Club (MCC), during the MCC's tour of Nepal.
