= Fatullah =

Place in Narayanganj District, Dhaka Division, Bangladesh

Fatulla ফতুল্লা
- Location within Bangladesh
- Coordinates: 23°38′46″N 90°29′8″E
- Country: Bangladesh
- Division: Dhaka Division
- District: Narayanganj District
- Time zone: BST

Fatullah (Bengali: ফতুল্লা) (also known as Fatulla) is a town and a Union in Narayanganj Sadar Upazila in Narayanganj District. It is located on the southern outskirts of Dhaka, in central Bangladesh.

It is the location of the Shaheed Ria Gope Cricket Stadium, an international cricket stadium that has hosted its first One Day International and Test match in 2006. In ICC Cricket World Cup 2011, it has hosted the warm up matches of England against Canada and Pakistan.

Fatulla is also one of the major industrial areas of Bangladesh. The second largest Eid al-Adha cattle market of Bangladesh, Fatulla DIT gorur haat, is situated in Fatulla. The royalties of Fatulla is the Chowdhury Family; a large area of Fatulla, Chowdhury Bari is named after the Chowdhury family. Before the system was abolished Kader Baksh Chowdhury was the last official Zamindar of Fatulla. History and the surrounding areas of the Fatulla has left marks of their lost glory. Kader baksh Chowdhury had three sons ohad Chowdhury, kholil Chowdhury and jolil chowdhury. Kader baksh Chowdhury's youngest son jolil chowdhury was one of the most powerful person in Narayanganj at the time. Jolil chowdhury was educated. He was one of five student who passed degree in 1905 from kalkata university. He has done so many things for his family also for his people. He had link with the Pakistani government.Now his family is one of the respected family in Narayanganj.The Majar of Shah Fatulla is situated here which is also under the control of Chowdhury Bari and very recently they have reconstructed their family mosque by notable persons of the Chowdhury family which is near their family graveyard. Fatulla is situated on bank of river called Buriganga. There are many Garments and Textile factories in Fatulla.
