= Cox's Bazar International Cricket Stadium =

Cricket stadium

Coordinates: 21°25′52.35″N 91°58′16.23″E

- Cox's Bazar Cricket Stadium
- Interactive map of Cox's Bazar International Cricket Stadium

Ground information
- Location: Cox's Bazar, Chittagong Division, Bangladesh
- Country: Bangladesh
- Establishment: 2014
- Capacity: 1,600
- Owner: National Sports Council
- Operator: Bangladesh Cricket Board
- Tenants: Bangladesh U-19 cricket team Bangladesh women cricket team Chittagong Division cricket team
- End names
- N/A; N/A

International information
- First women's ODI: 4 March 2014: Bangladesh v Pakistan
- Last women's ODI: 8 October 2018: Bangladesh v Pakistan
- First women's T20I: 8 March 2014: Bangladesh v Pakistan
- Last women's T20I: 6 October 2018: Bangladesh v Pakistan
- As of 2 September 2020; Source: Cox's Bazar International Cricket Stadium, Cricinfo

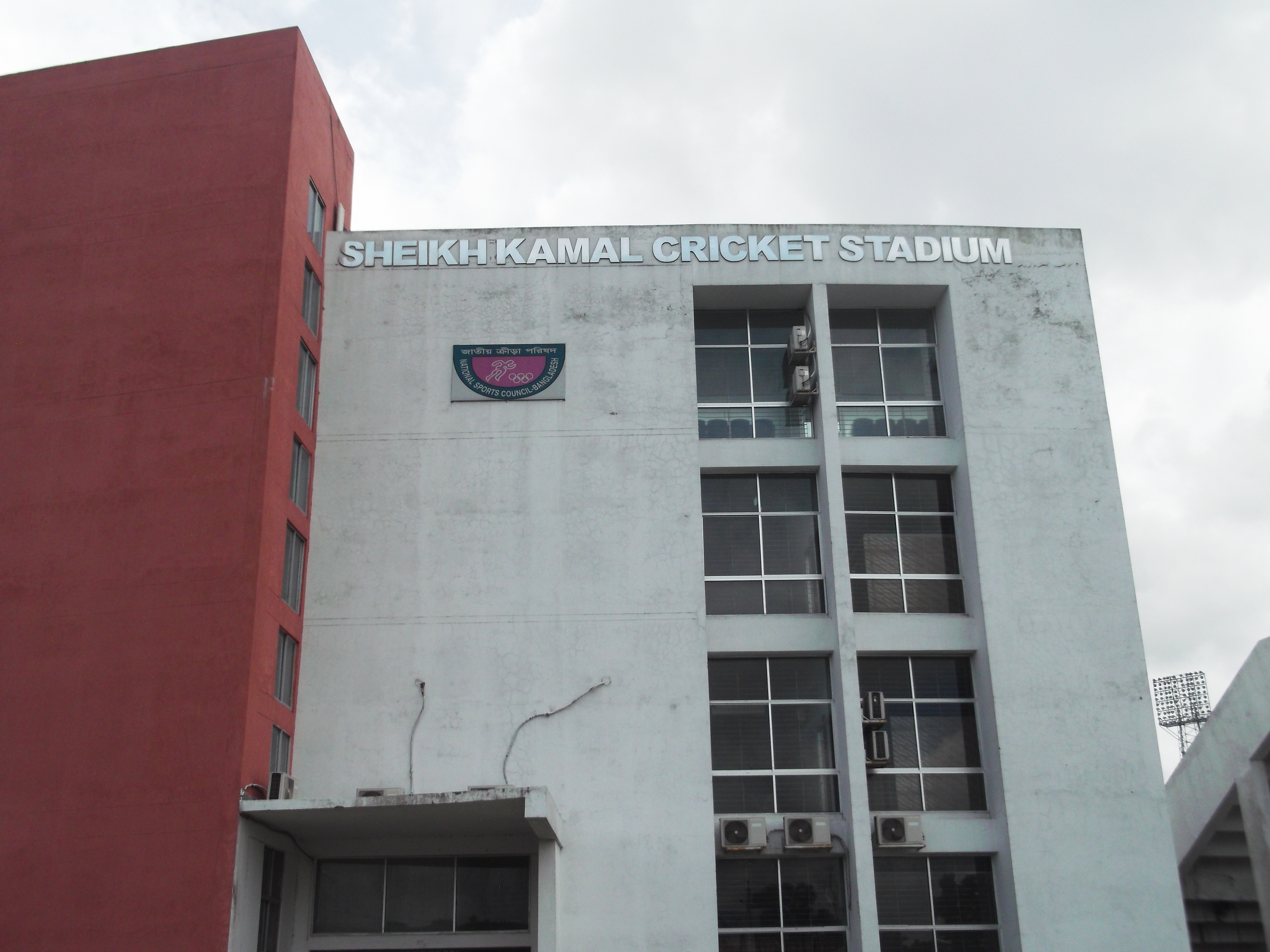
Outside view of the stadium

Cox's Bazar International Cricket Stadium (Bengali: কক্সবাজার আন্তর্জাতিক ক্রিকেট স্টেডিয়াম), is a cricket stadium in the tourist town of Cox's Bazar, Bangladesh.

It was built on leased land from Cox's Bazar Golf Course. The stadium was a shortlisted venue for the 2014 ICC World Twenty20, however it did not host any matches due to the construction not finishing in time for the tournament.

== History ==
The first match played at the stadium was a Women's One Day International match between Bangladesh and Pakistan on 5 March 2014. It hosted 2 matches of Under-19 One Day International between Bangladesh U-19 and South Africa U-19. Those 2 matches won by one each. Currently the venue is being used to host Under-19 One Day and Unofficial test matches played by Bangladesh U-19 and Bangladesh A team.

Since 2016 Under-19 Cricket World Cup, the venue was occasionally used for the training of women’s and Under-19 team members while some games of High-Performance Unit also took place.

=== 2016 ICC Under-19 Cricket World Cup ===
It was one of the seven venues of 2016 ICC Under-19 Cricket World Cup. The venue has hosted 17 group matches of the tournament including 8 matches played at academy ground.

== See also ==
- Stadiums in Bangladesh
- List of cricket grounds in Bangladesh
- Cox's Bazar Stadium
