= 2016 Under-19 Cricket World Cup squads =

Cricket squads

This is a list of the squads picked for the 2016 Under-19 Cricket World Cup. Bold indicates that a player went onto play senior international cricket.

== Group A ==
=== Bangladesh ===
Bangladesh's squad was announced on 23 December 2015.

Coach: Mohammad Mizanur Rahman

Player	Date of birth	Batting	Bowling style
**Mehidy Hasan Miraz** (c)	25 October 1997 (aged 18)	Right	Right-arm off spin
Abdul Halim	2 November 1998 (aged 17)	Right	Right-arm medium
Ariful Islam	20 December 1996 (aged 19)	Left	—
**Jaker Ali** (wk)	22 February 1998 (aged 17)	Right	—
Joyraz Sheik	21 September 1996 (aged 19)	Right	—
Mehedi Hasan Rana	1 January 1997 (aged 19)	Left	Left-arm fast
**Mohammad Saifuddin**	1 November 1996 (aged 19)	Left	Right-arm medium-fast
**Najmul Hossain Shanto**	25 May 1998 (aged 17)	Left	Right-arm medium
Pinak Ghosh	20 January 1999 (aged 17)	Left	—
Saeed Sarkar	5 May 1997 (aged 18)	Right	Right-arm off spin
**Saif Hassan**	30 October 1998 (aged 17)	Right	—
Saleh Ahmed	21 July 1997 (aged 18)	Left	Left-arm orthodox
Sanjit Saha	4 November 1997 (aged 18)	Right	Right-arm off spin
Shafiul Hayat	21 November 1997 (aged 18)	Right	Right-arm off spin
**Zakir Hasan** (wk)	1 February 1998 (aged 17)	Left	—

=== Namibia ===
Coach: Rangarirai Manyande

Player	Date of birth	Batting	Bowling style
**Zane Green** (c, wk)	11 October 1996 (aged 19)	Left	—
Charl Brits	22 July 1998 (aged 17)	Right	Right-arm off spin
Petrus Burger	3 November 1999 (aged 16)	Right	Right-arm leg spin
Fritz Coetzee	4 June 1997 (aged 18)	Right	Left-arm fast-medium
**Niko Davin**	19 December 1997 (aged 18)	Right	Right-arm leg spin
Motjaritje Honga	8 April 1997 (aged 18)	Right	Right-arm medium
Burton Jacobs	17 April 1997 (aged 18)	Right	Right-arm medium
Jürgen Linde	11 February 1999 (aged 16)	Left	Left-arm medium
SJ Loftie-Eaton	11 October 1996 (aged 19)	Right	Right-arm fast-medium
**Lo-handre Louwrens** (wk)	24 April 1999 (aged 16)	Right	—
Chrischen Olivier	13 March 1998 (aged 17)	Right	Right-arm medium-fast
Francois Rautenbach	17 October 1997 (aged 18)	Right	Right-arm off spin
**Michael van Lingen**	24 October 1997 (aged 18)	Left	—
Eben van Wyk	19 March 1999 (aged 16)	Right	Right-arm medium
Warren van Wyk	20 November 1997 (aged 18)	Left	Right-arm medium-fast

=== Scotland ===
Scotland's squad was announced on 22 December 2015. Scott Cameron was originally named in the squad, but was replaced by Cameron Sloman after injuring his back prior to the tournament.

Coaches: Gordon Drummond and Cedric English

Player	Date of birth	Batting	Bowling style
Neil Flack (c)	8 October 1997 (aged 18)	Left	—
Haris Aslam	12 September 1996 (aged 19)	Right	—
Ryan Brown	2 January 1997 (aged 19)	Right	Right-arm off spin
Harris Carnegie (wk)	4 February 1998 (aged 17)	Right	—
Azeem Dar	11 December 1996 (aged 19)	Right	—
Mohammad Ghaffar	27 September 1997 (aged 18)	Right	—
Rory Johnston	6 July 1999 (aged 16)	Right	—
Ihtisham Malik	1 March 1999 (aged 16)	Right	—
Finlay McCreath	16 October 1998 (aged 17)	Right	—
Mitchell Rao	3 April 1997 (aged 18)	Left	—
Owais Shah	1 October 1998 (aged 17)	Left	—
Cameron Sloman	20 December 1996 (aged 19)	Left	Left-arm medium
Jack Waller	13 February 1997 (aged 18)	Right	—
Simon Whait (wk)	19 September 1996 (aged 19)	Right	—
Ben Wilkinson	13 September 1996 (aged 19)	Right	Right-arm medium

- Note: bowling information on all Scottish players is not yet available.

=== South Africa ===
South Africa's squad was announced on 21 December 2015.

Coach: Lawrence Mahatlane

Player	Date of birth	Batting	Bowling style
**Tony de Zorzi** (c)	28 August 1997 (aged 18)	Left	Right-arm off spin
Ziyaad Abrahams	27 March 1997 (aged 18)	Right	Right-arm fast
**Dean Foxcroft**	20 April 1998 (aged 17)	Right	Right-arm off spin
**Dayyaan Galiem**	2 January 1997 (aged 19)	Right	Right-arm medium-fast
Willem Ludick	20 March 1997 (aged 18)	Right	Right-arm medium
Wandile Makwetu (wk)	7 January 1999 (aged 17)	Right	—
Conor McKerr	19 January 1998 (aged 18)	Right	Right-arm fast
Rivaldo Moonsamy	13 September 1996 (aged 19)	Right	—
**Wiaan Mulder**	19 February 1998 (aged 17)	Right	Right-arm medium
Luke Philander	30 April 1997 (aged 18)	Right	Right-arm off spin
Farhaan Sayanvala	8 July 1997 (aged 18)	Right	Right-arm off spin
**Lutho Sipamla**	12 May 1998 (aged 17)	Right	Right-arm fast
Liam Smith	11 May 1997 (aged 18)	Right	—
**Kyle Verreynne** (wk)	12 May 1997 (aged 18)	Right	Right-arm off spin
Sean Whitehead	7 March 1997 (aged 18)	Right	Left-arm orthodox

== Group B ==
=== Afghanistan ===
Coach: Dawlat Ahmadzai

Player	Date of birth	Batting	Bowling style
**Ihsanullah Janat** (c)	28 December 1997 (aged 18)	Right	—
**Ikram Alikhil**	29 September 2000 (aged 15)	Left	—
**Karim Janat**	11 August 1998 (aged 17)	Right	Right-arm medium
Mohammad Zahir	20 January 1997 (aged 19)	Left	Left-arm medium
Muslim Musa	15 January 1997 (aged 19)	Right	Right-arm medium
Naveed Obaid	28 August 2000 (aged 15)	Right	—
**Naveen-ul-Haq**	23 September 1999 (aged 16)	Right	Right-arm medium-fast
Nijat Masood	30 December 1998 (aged 17)	Right	Right-arm medium
Perwez Malakzai	3 October 2000 (aged 15)	Right	Right-arm off spin
**Rashid Khan**	20 September 1998 (aged 17)	Right	Right-arm leg spin
Shamsurrahman	25 November 1999 (aged 16)	Right	Right-arm off spin
Tariq Stanikzai	13 December 1999 (aged 16)	Left	Left-arm orthodox
Waheedullah Shafaq	2 January 1997 (aged 19)	Right	—
**Zahir Khan**	20 December 1998 (aged 17)	Left	Slow left-arm wrist-spin
Zia-ur-Rehman	30 December 1997 (aged 18)	Right	Left-arm orthodox

=== Canada ===
Coach: Errol Barrow

Player	Date of birth	Batting	Bowling style
Abraash Khan (c)	23 July 1998 (aged 17)	Right	Right-arm medium
Bhavindu Adhihetty	29 February 2000 (aged 15)	Left	Left-arm medium
Thursaanth Anantharajah	16 December 1996 (aged 19)	Left	Right-arm leg spin
Akash Gill	18 October 1999 (aged 16)	Left	Right-arm medium
Abdul Haseeb	4 December 1997 (aged 18)	Right	Right-arm fast-medium
Arslan Khan	16 April 1999 (aged 16)	Right	Right-arm medium
Suliman Khan	1 September 1997 (aged 18)	Right	Right-arm fast-medium
Mamik Luthra	17 October 1996 (aged 19)	Right	Right-arm off spin
Miraj Patel	29 December 1996 (aged 19)	Right	Right-arm off spin
Shlok Patel	14 July 1998 (aged 17)	Left	Left-arm orthodox
Kurt Ramdath	3 July 1997 (aged 18)	Right	Left-arm orthodox
Sarbot Sivia (wk)	10 June 1997 (aged 18)	Left	—
Amish Taploo (wk)	8 August 1997 (aged 18)	Right	—
Harsh Thaker	24 October 1997 (aged 18)	Right	Right-arm off spin
Prushoth Wijayaraj	10 May 1997 (aged 18)	Right	Right-arm fast-medium

=== Pakistan ===
Pakistan's squad was announced on 19 December 2015.

Coach: Muhammad Masroor

Player	Date of birth	Batting	Bowling style
Gauhar Hafeez (c)	26 December 1999 (aged 16)	Left	—
Ahmad Shafiq	18 December 1997 (aged 18)	Left	Left-arm orthodox
Arsal Sheikh	22 January 1997 (aged 19)	Right	Right-arm off spin
Hassan Khan	16 October 1998 (aged 17)	Left	Left-arm orthodox
Hasan Mohsin	11 January 1998 (aged 18)	Right	Right-arm leg spin
Arfan Liaqat	5 December 1998 (aged 17)	Right	Right-arm fast
Mohammad Umar	10 December 1998 (aged 17)	Right	—
Muhammad Asad	8 August 1998 (aged 17)	—	—
Saif Ali	27 October 1997 (aged 18)	Right	—
Saif Badar	3 July 1998 (aged 17)	Right	Right-arm leg spin
Salman Fayyaz	11 August 1997 (aged 18)	Left	Right-arm leg spin
Sameen Gul	4 February 1999 (aged 16)	Right	Right-arm medium
**Shadab Khan**	4 October 1998 (aged 17)	Right	—
Umair Masood (wk)	7 December 1997 (aged 18)	Right	—
Zeeshan Malik	26 December 1996 (aged 19)	Right	Right-arm off spin

=== Sri Lanka ===
Sri Lanka's squad was announced on 23 December 2015.

Coach: Roger Wijesuriya

Player	Date of birth	Batting	Bowling style
**Charith Asalanka** (c)	29 June 1997 (aged 18)	Left	Right-arm off spin
Shammu Ashan	9 January 1998 (aged 18)	Right	Right-arm off spin
Kaveen Bandara	22 August 1997 (aged 18)	Left	Right-arm medium-fast
Jehan Daniel	13 April 1999 (aged 16)	Right	Left-arm fast-medium
**Asitha Fernando**	31 July 1997 (aged 18)	Right	Right-arm medium-fast
**Avishka Fernando**	5 April 1998 (aged 17)	Right	Right-arm medium-fast
**Wanindu Hasaranga**	29 July 1997 (aged 18)	Right	Right-arm leg spin
**Lahiru Kumara**	13 February 1997 (aged 18)	Left	Right-arm medium-fast
**Kamindu Mendis**	30 September 1998 (aged 17)	Left	Left-arm orthodox
Charana Nanayakkara	23 November 1997 (aged 18)	Right	Right-arm medium-fast
Thilan Nimesh	29 November 1997 (aged 18)	Right	Left-arm orthodox
Vishad Randika (wk)	2 September 1997 (aged 18)	Right	—
Lahiru Samarakoon	3 March 1997 (aged 18)	Left	Left-arm fast-medium
Damitha Silva	26 August 1998 (aged 17)	Left	Left-arm orthodox
Salinda Ushan	2 January 1997 (aged 19)	Left	Right-arm off spin

== Group C ==
=== England ===
England named their 15-man squad on 22 December.

Coach: Andy Hurry

Player	Date of birth	Batting	Bowling style
Brad Taylor (c)	14 March 1997 (aged 18)	Right	Right-arm off break
**Daniel Lawrence** (vc)	12 July 1997 (aged 18)	Right	Right-arm leg break
Jack Burnham	16 January 1997 (aged 19)	Right	Right-arm medium
George Bartlett	14 March 1998 (aged 17)	Right	Right-arm off break
**Mason Crane**	18 February 1997 (aged 18)	Right	Right-arm leg break
**Sam Curran**	3 June 1998 (aged 17)	Left	Left-arm medium-fast
Ryan Davies (wk)	5 November 1996 (aged 19)	Right	—
Aneurin Donald	20 December 1996 (aged 19)	Right	Right-arm off break
**George Garton**	15 April 1997 (aged 18)	Left	Left-arm medium-fast
Ben Green	28 September 1997 (aged 18)	Right	Right-arm fast-medium
Max Holden	18 December 1997 (aged 18)	Left	Right-arm off break
**Saqib Mahmood**	25 February 1997 (aged 18)	Right	Right-arm fast-medium
Tom Moores (wk)	4 September 1996 (aged 19)	Left	—
Callum Taylor	26 June 1997 (aged 18)	Right	Right-arm medium
Jared Warner	14 November 1996 (aged 19)	Right	Right-arm fast-medium

=== Fiji ===
Coach: Shane Jurgensen

Player	Date of birth	Batting	Bowling style
Saimoni Tuitoga (c)	27 April 1997 (aged 18)	Right	Right-arm medium-fast
Josaia Baleicikoibia	30 June 1997 (aged 18)	Right	Right-arm medium
Petero Cabebula	19 January 1999 (aged 17)	Right	Right-arm medium
Jack Charters	20 April 1999 (aged 16)	Right	Right-arm fast
Malakai Cokovaki	8 November 1998 (aged 17)	Right	Right-arm medium
Jordan Dunham	12 September 1997 (aged 18)	Right	Right-arm medium
Vaibhav Kapadia	6 February 1998 (aged 17)	Right	Right-arm off break
Delaimatuku Maraiwai	22 May 1997 (aged 18)	Right	—
Ledua Qionivoka	2 August 1997 (aged 18)	Right	Right-arm medium
Samuel Saunokonoko	27 January 1998 (aged 18)	Right	—
Cakacaka Tikoisuva	31 May 1997 (aged 18)	Right	Right-arm medium
Peni Vuniwaqa	29 September 1997 (aged 18)	Right	Right-arm medium
Sosiceni Weleilakeba	21 September 1997 (aged 18)	Right	Right-arm medium
Tuwai Yabaki	1 January 2000 (aged 16)	Right	Right-arm off break

=== West Indies ===
West Indies named their squad on 31 December. Obed McCoy sustained an injury before the quarter finals took place and Chemar Holder was called in to replace him.

Coach: Graeme West

Player	Date of birth	Batting	Bowling style
**Shimron Hetmyer** (c)	26 December 1996 (aged 19)	Left	Right-arm leg break
**Keacy Carty**	19 March 1997 (aged 18)	Right	Right-arm medium
Shahid Crooks	22 December 1996 (aged 19)	Right	Right-arm medium-fast
Michael Frew	15 December 1997 (aged 18)	Right	Right-arm off break
Jyd Goolie	11 May 1997 (aged 18)	Left	Right-arm off break
**Tevin Imlach** (wk)	30 November 1996 (aged 19)	Right	—
Ryan John	25 September 1997 (aged 18)	Right	Right-arm medium-fast
**Alzarri Joseph**	20 November 1996 (aged 19)	Right	Right-arm fast-medium
Kirstan Kallicharan	29 December 1999 (aged 16)	Right	Right-arm off break
**Obed McCoy**	4 January 1997 (aged 19)	Left	Left-arm fast-medium
**Keemo Paul**	21 February 1998 (aged 17)	Right	Right-arm fast-medium
Gidron Pope	24 November 1996 (aged 19)	Left	Right-arm off break
**Odean Smith**	1 November 1996 (aged 19)	Right	Right-arm medium
**Shamar Springer**	26 November 1997 (aged 18)	Right	Right-arm fast-medium
Emmanuel Stewart	23 August 1999 (aged 16)	Right	—
Chemar Holder	3 March 1998 (aged 17)	Right	Right-arm fast-medium

=== Zimbabwe ===
Coach: Stephen Mangongo

Player	Date of birth	Batting	Bowling style
**Brandon Mavuta** (c)	3 April 1997 (aged 18)	Right	Right-arm leg break
Trevor Chibvongodze	13 November 1996 (aged 19)	—	—
Jeremy Ives	25 December 1996 (aged 19)	Right	Slow left-arm orthodox
Adam Keefe	3 May 1997 (aged 18)	Right	Right-arm medium
**Wesley Madhevere**	4 September 2000 (aged 15)	Right	Right-arm off break
Rugare Magarira	27 April 1997 (aged 18)	Right	Slow left-arm wrist-spin
William Mashinge	6 October 1996 (aged 19)	Right	Right-arm fast-medium
Kundai Matigimu	2 February 1998 (aged 17)	Right	Right-arm fast
Sydney Murombo	22 March 1997 (aged 18)	Right	Right-arm medium
Ryan Murray (wk)	30 March 1998 (aged 17)	Right	Right-arm off break
**Richard Ngarava**	28 December 1997 (aged 18)	Left	Left-arm fast
Akshay Patel	1 June 1997 (aged 18)	—	—
**Milton Shumba**	19 October 2000 (aged 15)	—	—
Brendan Sly (wk)	30 December 1998 (aged 17)	Right	—
Shaun Snyder	3 June 1997 (aged 18)	Right	—

== Group D ==
=== India ===
India's squad was announced on 22 December 2015:

Coach: Rahul Dravid

Player	Date of birth	Batting	Bowling style
**Ishan Kishan** (c & wk)	18 July 1998 (aged 17)	Left	—
**Rishabh Pant** (vc & wk)	4 October 1997 (aged 18)	Left	—
**Khaleel Ahmed**	5 December 1997 (aged 18)	Right	Left-arm medium
Zeeshan Ansari	16 December 1999 (aged 16)	Right	Right-arm leg break
Rahul Batham	21 August 1998 (aged 17)	Right	Right-arm medium
Ricky Bhui	29 September 1996 (aged 19)	Right	Right-arm leg break
Mayank Dagar	11 November 1996 (aged 19)	Right	Slow left-arm orthodox
Armaan Jaffer	25 October 1998 (aged 17)	Right	Right-arm off break
**Avesh Khan**	13 December 1996 (aged 19)	Right	Right-arm medium
**Sarfaraz Khan**	27 October 1997 (aged 18)	Right	Right-arm off break
Amandeep Khare	5 August 1997 (aged 18)	Right	Right-arm medium
Mahipal Lomror	16 November 1999 (aged 16)	Left	Right-arm off break
Shubham Mavi	12 December 1997 (aged 18)	Right	Right-arm medium
Anmolpreet Singh	28 March 1998 (aged 17)	Right	Right-arm off break
**Washington Sundar**	5 October 1999 (aged 16)	Left	Right-arm off break

=== Ireland ===
Ireland were added to the tournament on 6 January 2016 after Australia withdrew. They announced their squad two days later:

Coach: Ryan Eagleson

Player	Date of birth	Batting	Bowling style
Jack Tector (c)	2 September 1996 (aged 19)	Right	Right-arm off break
Rory Anders	10 December 1997 (aged 18)	Right	Right-arm fast
Andrew Austin	3 September 1997 (aged 18)	Left	—
Varun Chopra	1 February 2000 (aged 15)	Right	Right-arm leg break
Adam Dennison	3 May 1997 (aged 18)	Right	—
**Stephen Doheny**	20 August 1998 (aged 17)	Right	—
Aaron Gillespie	13 March 1997 (aged 18)	—	—
**Josh Little**	1 November 1999 (aged 16)	Right	Left-arm fast
Gary McClintock	1 January 1997 (aged 19)	Right	—
**William McClintock**	1 January 1997 (aged 19)	Right	Right-arm medium
Tom Stanton	21 September 1997 (aged 18)	Right	Left-arm medium
**Harry Tector**	6 November 1999 (aged 16)	Right	—
Fiachra Tucker	5 December 1997 (aged 18)	Right	—
**Lorcan Tucker** (wk)	10 September 1996 (aged 19)	Right	—
**Ben White**	29 August 1998 (aged 17)	Right	Right-arm leg break

=== Nepal ===
Coach: Jagat Tamatta

There were some concerns about the eligibility of Nepal's captain, Raju Rijal, with reports stating he was over 19 years of age. However, the ICC were satisfied that his date of birth was correct.

Player	Date of birth	Batting	Bowling style
Raju Rijal (c & wk)	26 September 1996 (aged 19)	Right	—
**Dipendra Airee**	24 January 2000 (aged 16)	Right	Right-arm medium
Kushal Bhurtel	22 January 1997 (aged 19)	Right	Right-arm medium
Sunil Dhamala	11 January 1997 (aged 19)	Right	Right-arm off break
Himanshu Dutta	13 March 1997 (aged 18)	Right
Sushil Kandel	8 April 1997 (aged 18)	Left	Slow left-arm orthodox
Yogendra Karki	3 July 1997 (aged 18)	Right	—
**Sandeep Lamichhane**	2 August 2000 (aged 15)	Right	Leg break googly
Ishan Pandey	2 March 1998 (aged 17)	Left	—
Shankar Rana	6 November 1996 (aged 19)	Right	—
Aarif Sheikh	5 October 1997 (aged 18)	Right	Right-arm medium
Sandeep Sunar	14 September 1998 (aged 17)	Right	Right-arm leg break
Dipesh Shrestha	8 May 1998 (aged 17)	Right	Right-arm medium
Rajbir Singh	26 September 1997 (aged 18)	Left	Slow left-arm orthodox
Prem Tamang	25 December 1996 (aged 19)	Right	Right-arm off break

=== New Zealand ===
New Zealand's squad was announced on 24 December 2015:

Coach: Bob Carter

Player	Date of birth	Batting	Bowling style
Josh Finnie (c)	18 December 1996 (aged 19)	Right	Right-arm off break
**Finn Allen** (wk)	22 April 1999 (aged 16)	Right	—
**Josh Clarkson**	21 January 1997 (aged 19)	Right	Right-arm medium
Zak Gibson	19 March 1997 (aged 18)	Right	Right-arm medium
Christian Leopard	17 September 1997 (aged 18)	Right	Right-arm medium
Felix Murray	29 October 1998 (aged 17)	Left	Slow left-arm orthodox
Aniket Parikh	7 July 1997 (aged 18)	Right	Right-arm off break
Dale Phillips	15 October 1998 (aged 17)	Right	Right-arm fast-medium
**Glenn Phillips** (wk)	6 December 1996 (aged 19)	Right	—
**Rachin Ravindra**	18 November 1999 (aged 16)	Left	Slow left-arm orthodox
Talor Scott (wk)	31 December 1996 (aged 19)	Right	—
**Ben Sears**	11 February 1998 (aged 17)	Right	Right-arm medium-fast
**Nathan Smith**	15 July 1998 (aged 17)	Right	Right-arm medium-fast
Daniel Stanley	5 September 1996 (aged 19)	Left	Left-arm medium-fast
Ross ter Braak	5 June 1997 (aged 18)	Right	Left-arm fast-medium

== Notes ==
Australia's squad was announced on 19 December 2015. However, on 5 January 2016, Cricket Australia announced that the Australian U19 squad have pulled out of the tournament, citing security concerns. Australia's squad consisted of the following players: Wes Agar, Michael Cormack, Kyle Gardiner, Jordan Gauci, Brooke Guest, David Grant, Sam Grimwade, Sam Harper, Liam Hatcher, Clint Hinchliffe, Henry Hunt, Caleb Jewell, Jonathan Merlo, Arjun Nair, Tom O'Donnell, Jonte Pattison, Patrick Page, Jhye Richardson, Jason Sangha, Ben Taylor and Henry Thornton.
