= 2016–17 Futures League =

- Dates: 17 October 2016 – 9 March 2017
- Administrator(s): Cricket Australia
- Cricket format: 4 Day
- Tournament format(s): Round-robin tournament
- Participants: 7
- Matches: 21

The 2016–17 Futures League is the 11th season of the Futures League, the domestic second tier cricket competition in Australia.

== Points Table ==
Pos	Team	Pld	W	L	D	NR	Pts
1st	Tasmania	3	3	0	0	0	22.80
2nd	Queensland	3	2	1	0	0	19.84
3rd	Western Australia	3	1	1	1	0	12.76
4th	Australian Capital Territory	3	0	1	2	0	7.38
5th	South Australia	2	0	1	1	0	4.64
6th	(Victoria (state)) Victoria	2	0	1	1	0	4.38
7th	New South Wales	2	0	1	1	0	3.42

== Round-robin ==
=== Round 1 ===
17–20 October

Australian Capital Territory (H)	v	South Australia (A)
276 (66 overs); Brad Haddin 114 (114); Nick Winter 4/71 (20 overs)		613 (160.2 overs); Kelvin Smith 210 (359); Nathan McAndrew 4/150 (33.2 overs)
482 (131.1 overs); Brad Haddin 190 (222); Daniel Drew 3/44 (15 overs)		3/80 (7.1 overs); Kelvin Smith 22 (15); Thomas Rogers 2/35 (4.1 overs)

Match Drawn
Manuka Oval, Canberra
Umpires: Dinusha Bandara, Andrew Crozier
Player of the match: (Australian Capital Territory) Brad Haddin

- South Australia won the toss and elected to field.

17–20 October

Queensland (A)	v	Tasmania (H)
6/424d (113 overs); Peter Forrest 125 (228); Sam Rainbird 2/60 (21 overs)		4/352d (126 overs); Jordan Silk 106* (230); Matthew Kuhnemann 2/66 (24 overs)
5/251d (67.4 overs); Alecz Day 62 (81); Andrew Perrin 2/52 (13 overs)		3/325 (68 overs); Jake Doran 138* (163); Michael Granger 2/39 (9 overs)

Tasmania Won By 7 Wickets
Kingston Twin Ovals, Hobart
Umpires: Muhammad Qureshi, Wade Stewart
Player of the match: (Tasmania) Jake Doran

- Tasmania won the toss and elected to field.

17–20 October

Western Australia (A)	v	(Victoria (state)) Victoria (H)
443 (120.5 overs); Jono Wells 153 (191); James Muirhead 3/85 (25.5 overs)		7/406d (118 overs); Seb Gotch 125 (234); Ryan Duffield 3/82 (24 overs)
2/295d (60 overs); Jono Wells 149*(157); Thomas Smyth 1/89 (15 overs)		6/189 (46 overs); Travis Dean 74 (101); Josh Nicholas 4/37 (9 overs)

Match Drawn
Casey Fields, Melbourne
Umpires: Stephen Brne, Dale Ireland
Player of the match: (Western Australia) Jono Wells

- Western Australia won the toss and elected to bat.

=== Round 2 ===
7–10 November

Queensland (H)	v	(Victoria (state)) Victoria (A)
405 (95 overs); Sam Truloff 104 (129); Tom O'Donnell 4/62 (16 overs)		9/263d (83.3 overs); Matthew Short 100* (176); Ben Cutting 3/68 (13 overs)
4/290d (54 overs); Sam Truloff 90 (116); James Muirhead 2/111 (12 overs)		185 (56.1 overs); Blake Thomson 55 (79); Cameron Gannon 3/40 (16.1 overs)

Queensland Won By 247 Runs
Allan Border Field, Brisbane
Umpires: Simon Lightbody, Damien Mealey
Player of the match: (Queensland) Sam Truloff

- Queensland won the toss and elected to bat.

7–10 November

Tasmania (A)	v	New South Wales (H)
7/364d (130.5 overs); Ben McDermott 72 (183); Gurinder Sandhu 2/67 (18 overs)		330 (106.5 overs); Nick Larkin 56 (110); Andrew Perrin 3/32 (22 overs)
6/276d (62 overs); Daniel Salpietro 102* (153); Gurinder Sandhu 3/25 (12 overs)		236 (63.2 overs); Charles Wakim 46 (72); Andrew Perrin 3/38 (15.2 overs)

Tasmania Won By 74 Runs
Blacktown International Sportspark, Sydney
Umpires: Nathan Johnstone, Troy Penman
Player of the match: (Tasmania) Andrew Perrin

- Tasmania won the toss and elected to bat first.

7–10 November

Australian Capital Territory (H)	v	Western Australia (A)
277 (71.2 overs); Jono Dean 164 (231); D'Arcy Short 4/49 (13 overs)		325 (94.4 overs); Josh Inglis 121 (157); Joe Slater 4/61 (20 overs)
264 (107.1 overs); Daniel Solway 102 (240); D'Arcy Short 5/97 (30 overs)		4/217 (59.5 overs); Nick Hobson 46* (115); Ben Manenti 2/52 (19 overs)

Western Australia Won By 6 Wickets
Manuka Oval, Canberra
Umpires: Donovan Koch, Claire Polosak
Player of the match: (Western Australia) D'Arcy Short

- Australian Capital Territory won the toss and elected to bat.

=== Round 3 ===
21–24 November

South Australia (A)	v	Queensland (H)
217 (54.3 overs); Sam Raphael 97 (108); Michael Neser 3/37 (15 overs)		578 (134.3 overs); James Peirson 158* (156); Tom Andrews 4/123 (34 overs)
281 (70.3 overs); Harry Nielsen 102 (148); Xavier Bartlett 2/24 (6 overs)

Queensland Won By An Innings And 80 Runs
Allan Border Field, Brisbane
Umpires: Murray Branch, Anthony Hobson
Player of the match: (Queensland) James Peirson

- South Australia won the toss and elected to bat.

21–24 November

Western Australia (H)	v	Tasmania (A)
300 (107 overs); Will Bosisto 96 (220); Andrew Perrin 4/65 (21 overs)		398 (113.2 overs); Tim Paine 99 (161); Andrew Rule 3/64 (17 overs)
230 (106.4 overs); Jacob Whiteaker 73 (183); Andrew Fekete 4/34 (20.4 overs)		2/135 (23.2 overs); Jake Hancock 67* (75); Ryan Duffield 2/56 (9.2 overs)

Tasmania Won By 8 Wickets
Lilac Hill Park, Perth
Umpires: James Hewitt, Ben Treloar
Player of the match: (Tasmania) Andrew Fekete

- Western Australia won the toss and elected to bat.

21–24 November

Australian Capital Territory (A)	v	New South Wales (H)
419 (119.5 overs); John Rogers 93 (173); Pat Cummins 3/39 (15 overs)		179 (70.2 overs); Ryan Gibson 80 (154); Mitchell Phelps 3/51 (20.2 overs)
7/238d (64.4 overs); John Rogers 84 (117); Gurinder Sandhu 2/32 (8 overs)		8/473 (116 overs); Nic Larkin 210 (324); Thomas Rogers 4/163 (33 overs)

Match Drawn
North Dalton Park, Wollongong
Umpires: Troy Penman, Glen Stubbings
Player of the match: (New South Wales) Nic Larkin

- Australian Capital Territory won the toss and elected to bat.

=== Round 4 ===
23–26 January

Western Australia	v	Queensland

Stevens Reserve, Fremantle

23–26 January

Tasmania	v	South Australia

Lindisfarne Oval, Hobart

23–26 January

(Victoria (state)) Victoria	v	New South Wales

Kardinia Park, Geelong

=== Round 5 ===
6–9 February

New South Wales	v	Queensland

Drummoyne Oval, Sydney

6–9 February

(Victoria (state)) Victoria	v	Australian Capital Territory

Jubilee Park, Melbourne

6–9 February

South Australia	v	Western Australia

Glenelg Oval, Glenelg

=== Round 6 ===
20–23 February

Western Australia	v	New South Wales

Lilac Hill Park, Perth

20–23 February

Australian Capital Territory	v	Tasmania

TBC

20–23 February

South Australia	v	(Victoria (state)) Victoria

Glenelg Oval, Glenelg

=== Round 7 ===
6–9 March

Queensland	v	Australian Capital Territory

Allan Border Field, Brisbane

6–9 March

South Australia	v	New South Wales

Glenelg Oval, Glenelg

6–9 March

Tasmania	v	(Victoria (state)) Victoria

Kingston Twin Ovals, Hobart

== Statistics ==
=== Most Runs ===
Player	Team	Mat	Inns	NO	Runs	Ave	SR	HS	100	50
Sam Truloff	Queensland	3	5	0	362	72.40	73.6	115	2	1
Jake Hancock	Tasmania	3	6	0	329	65.80	51.1	134	1	2
Nic Larkin	New South Wales	2	4	0	309	77.25	60.0	210	1	1
Brad Haddin	Australian Capital Territory	1	2	0	304	152.00	90.5	190	2	0
Jono Wells	Western Australia	1	2	1	302	302.00	86.8	153	2	0

=== Most Wickets ===
Player	Team	Mat	Overs	Wkts	Runs	5WI	10WM	BBI	Ave	SR	Ecn
Andrew Perrin	Tasmania	3	122.2	16	338	0	0	4/65	21.13	45.88	2.76
Thomas Rogers	Australian Capital Territory	3	114.1	10	455	0	0	4/163	45.50	68.50	3.99
D'Arcy Short	Western Australia	1	43	9	128	1	0	5/79	14.22	28.67	2.98
Cameron Gannon	Queensland	2	56.4	9	146	0	0	3/40	16.22	37.78	2.58
Nathan McAndrew	Australian Capital Territory	2	64.2	9	259	0	0	4/150	28.78	42.89	4.03
