= 2025 Women's PacificAus Sports Invitational =

International cricket tournament

2025 Women's Pacific AusSports Cricket Invitational
- Dates: 15 – 21 June 2025
- Administrator: Cricket PNG
- Cricket format: Twenty20 International
- Tournament format: Round-robin
- Host: Papua New Guinea
- Champions: Papua New Guinea
- Runners-up: Australia Indigenous
- Participants: 4
- Matches: 12
- Most runs: (Vanuatu) Rachel Andrew (145)
- Most wickets: (Australia) Christina Coulson (11) (Papua New Guinea) Isabel Toua (11)

The 2025 Women's PacificAus Sports Invitational was a Twenty20 International (T20I) cricket tournament that took place in Papua New Guinea from 15 to 21 June 2025. This was the inaugural edition of annual Women's PacificAus Sports Invitational tournament, a first-of-its-kind event that brings Pacific and First Nations cricketers together. This tournament was played as a part of Papua New Guinea's 50th independence celebrations. The participating teams were Australia Indigenous, Papua New Guinea, Samoa and Vanuatu. The tournament is hosted by Cricket PNG, and supported by PacificAus sports programme of the Australian Government and Cricket Australia. This was following the renewal of PacificAus partnership with cricket in the Pacific region. The tournament was played as a tribute to the relations between Australia across the Blue Pacific. These matches were the first Women's Twenty20 International matches played in Papua New Guinean soil.

The teams competed in a double round-robin, after which Papua New Guinea won the title for finishing at top of the points table. PNG finished with four wins and one loss, and won the title by having a higher net run rate than the next placed Australia Indigenous team with equal points.

Australia's High Commissioner to Samoa, HE Will Robinson said “The Australian Government is proud to partner with the Samoa International Cricket Association to help the Samoan team to attend the inaugural PacificAus Sports Cricket Invitational". Previously, PacificAus Sports had supported Samoan cricket team by a visit from Australian cricketer Cathryn Fitzpatrick ahead of the 2025 Under-19 Women's T20 World Cup in January 2025, which was the first time Samoa had qualified for an ICC World Cup tournament at any level.

The tournament was supported by numerous sponsors and supporting partners, which included Capital Insurance, Steel Industries, MJ Electrical, Dulux, Pure Water, Boroko Motors, Brian Bell, Pacific International Hospital, Digicel, Royal Papua Yacht Club, Black Swan Security Services, Bishop Brothers, PNG Motors, BOC Gases, Guard Dog Security Services, Queensland Cricket, Business for Health PNG, Olympic Committee and Business Coalition for Women.

On 18 June, the teams were welcomed by a tea reception from the Australian High Commissioner to PNG and the Special Envoy to the Pacific, Ewen McDonald at the Australian High Commission head office in Port Moresby. On 21 June, the final day of the tournament, a closing ceremony was held along with the trophy presentation, which was attended by guests that included the Australian Acting High Commissioner to PNG, Adrian Lochrin, Chairman of the Motu Koita Assembly, Dadi Toka Jr, PNG Olympic Committee President, Emma Waiwai and Brett Wood of Cricket Australia.

== Squads ==
Australian Indigenous	Papua New Guinea	Samoa	Vanuatu
Christina Coulson (c); Emma Manix-Geeves (wk); Grace Abdy; Callee Black; Dharmini Chauhan; Ella Hayward; Mikayla Hinkley; Veronica Keen; Anika Learoyd; Tahlia Meier; Clodagh Ryall; Elsie Simpson; Maddison Spence; Charlotte Toohey	Brenda Tau (c, wk); Melanie Ani; Vicky Buruka; Hollan Doriga; Dika Lohia; Konio Oala; Erani Pokana; Miria Raio; Lakshmi Rajadurai; Pauke Siaka; Hane Tau; Henao Thomas; Geua Tom; Mairi Tom; Isabel Toua; Naoani Vare	Kolotita Nonu (c); Carol Agafili; Ailaoa Aoina; Taalili Iosefo; Olive Lefaga; Filimaua Malotutoatasi; Avetia Mapu; Norah Salima; Fa'aiuga Sisifo; Jacinta Sanele; Tuaoloa Semau; Angel Sootaga (wk); Masina Tafea; Faatamalii Tiuga	Rachel Andrew (c); Alvina Chilia (vc); Melissa Fare; Anna Griffin; Natalia Kakor; Valenta Langiatu; Vicky Mansale; Nasimana Navaika; Rayline Ova; Naitha Simelum; Susan Stephen; Mahina Tarimiala (wk); Vanessa Vira

== Points table ==
Pos	Team	Pld	W	L	NR	Pts	NRR
1	Papua New Guinea	6	5	1	0	10	1.646
2	Australian Indigenous	6	5	1	0	10	1.422
3	Vanuatu	6	1	4	1	3	−1.140
4	Samoa	6	0	5	1	1	−2.502

Source: Cricclubs

== Fixtures ==
15 June 2025
10:00
Scorecard

Papua New Guinea; 108/6 (20.0 overs)	v	Australia Indigenous; 109/2 (18.0 overs)
Brenda Tau 46* (46); Christina Coulson 2/10 (3 overs)		Anika Learoyd 62* (57); Isabel Toua 1/22 (4 overs)

Australia Indigenous won by 8 wickets
Amini Park, Port Moresby
Player of the match: Anika Learoyd (Aus)

- Papua New Guinea won the toss and elected to bat.

15 June 2025
14:00
Scorecard

Vanuatu; 116/9 (20.0 overs)	v	Samoa; 12/2 (1.3 overs)
Valenta Langiatu 34 (40); Taalili Iosefo 3/19 (4 overs)		Carol Agafili 10 (7); Vanessa Vira 1/5 (1 over)

No result
Amini Park, Port Moresby
Umpires: Lakani Oala (PNG) and Raka Ipi (PNG)

- Samoa won the toss and elected to field first.
- Faatamalii Tiuga (Sam) and Anna Griffin (Van) both made their T20I debuts.

16 June 2025
10:00
Scorecard

Australia Indigenous; 116/3 (20.0 overs)	v	Samoa; 70 (15.0 overs)
Clodagh Ryall 44 (57); Tuaoloa Helen Semau 2/21 (3 overs)		Fa'aiuga Sisifo 13 (15); Christina Coulson 3/7 (2 overs)

Australia Indigenous won by 46 runs
Amini Park, Port Moresby
Player of the match: Christina Coulson (Aus)

- Australia Indigenous won the toss and elected to bat.

16 June 2025
14:00
Scorecard

Papua New Guinea; 98 (20.0 overs)	v	Vanuatu; 63 (18.2 overs)
Henao Thomas 46 (47); Rachel Andrew 3/19 (4 overs)		Valenta Langiatu 19 (39); Isabel Toua 4/5 (3.2 overs)

Papua New Guinea won by 35 runs
Amini Park, Port Moresby
Umpires: Alu Kapa (PNG) and Lakani Oala (PNG)
Player of the match: Isabel Toua (PNG)

- Papua New Guinea won the toss and elected to bat.
- Lakshmi Rajadurai (PNG) made her T20I debut.

17 June 2025
10:00
Scorecard

Samoa; 64 (17.0 overs)	v	Papua New Guinea; 65/6 (12.2 overs)
Taalili Iosefo 22 (25); Pauke Siaka 4/3 (3 overs)		Naoani Vare 24* (35); Dika Lohia 2/7 (3 overs)

Papua New Guinea won by 4 wickets
Amini Park, Port Moresby
Umpires: Koita Atai (PNG) and Alu Kapa (PNG)
Player of the match: Pauke Siaka (PNG)

- Samoa won the toss and elected to bat.
- Miria Raio (PNG) made her T20I debut.

17 June 2025
14:00
Scorecard

Vanuatu; 94/8 (20.0 overs)	v	Australia Indigenous; 95/4 (18.4 overs)
Rachel Andrew 56* (54); Ella Hayward 3/17 (3 overs)		Tahlia Meier 31* (52); Vicky Mansale 2/17 (4 overs)

Australia Indigenous won by 6 wickets
Amini Park, Port Moresby
Player of the match: Rachel Andrew (Van)

- Vanuatu won the toss and elected to bat.

19 June 2025
10:00
Scorecard

Australia Indigenous; 111/7 (20.0 overs)	v	Papua New Guinea; 113/8 (19.5 overs)
Callee Black 49 (40); Holland Doriga 3/8 (4 overs)		Pauke Siaka 33* (35); Grace Abdy 3/17 (4 overs)

Papua New Guinea won by 2 wickets
Amini Park, Port Moresby
Player of the match: Pauke Siaka (PNG)

- Australia Indigenous won the toss and elected to bat.

19 June 2025
14:00
Scorecard

Vanuatu; 102/6 (20.0 overs)	v	Samoa; 93 (18.3 overs)
Rachel Andrew 56 (62); Olive Lefaga 2/14 (4 overs)		Taalili Iosefo 35 (25); Rayline Ova 5/14 (3.3 overs)

Vanuatu won by 9 runs
Amini Park, Port Moresby
Umpires: Koita Atai (PNG) and Alu Kapa (PNG)
Player of the match: Rayline Ova (Van)

- Vanuatu won the toss and elected to bat.

20 June 2025
10:00
Scorecard

Papua New Guinea; 98/8 (20.0 overs)	v	Vanuatu; 67 (16.4 overs)
Henao Thomas 27 (46); Vicky Mansale 3/31 (4 overs)		Rachel Andrew 16 (16); Isabel Toua 3/8 (4 overs)

Papua New Guinea won by 31 runs
Amini Park, Port Moresby
Umpires: Alu Kapa (PNG) and Raka Ipi (PNG)
Player of the match: Isabel Toua (PNG)

- Papua New Guinea won the toss and elected to bat.
- Melanie Ani (PNG) made her T20I debut.

20 June 2025
14:00
Scorecard

Samoa; 51/10 (16.0 overs)	v	Australia Indigenous; 52/3 (10.2 overs)
Carol Lora Agafili 16 (18); Christina Coulson 4/3 (2 overs)		Christina Coulson 18 (19); Carol Lora Agafili 3/10 (3 overs)

Australia Indigenous won by 7 wickets
Amini Park, Port Moresby
Player of the match: Dharmini Chauhan

- Samoa won the toss and elected to bat.

21 June 2025
10:00
Scorecard

Vanuatu; 60 (16.1 overs)	v	Australia Indigenous; 62/2 (11.0 overs)
Susan Stephen 10 (11); Ella Hayward 4/10 (4 overs)		Ella Hayward 21* (25); Nasimana Navaika 1/14 (2 overs)

Australia Indigenous won by 8 wickets
Amini Park, Port Moresby
Player of the match: Ella Hayward (Aus)

- Vanuatu won the toss and elected to bat.

21 June 2025
14:00
Scorecard

Papua New Guinea; 138/6 (20.0 overs)	v	Samoa; 44 (11.0 overs)
Naoani Vare 30 (43); Tuaoloa Semau 2/21 (4 overs)		Jacinta Sanele 12 (20); Henao Thomas 3/8 (3 overs)

Papua New Guinea won by 94 runs
Amini Park, Port Moresby
Umpires: Alu Kapa (PNG) and Lakani Oala (PNG)
Player of the match: Henao Thomas (PNG)

- Papua New Guinea won the toss and elected to bat.
