= Australia A Team Quadrangular Series in 2014 =

- Dates: 20 July – 2 August 2014
- Administrator: Cricket Australia
- Cricket format: One Day International
- Tournament format(s): Round-robin and final
- Host: Australia
- Champions: India A
- Runners-up: Australia A
- Participants: 4
- Matches: 14
- Most runs: Rilee Rossouw (337) (South Africa A)
- Most wickets: Dhawal Kulkarni (14) (India A); Marchant de Lange (14) (South Africa A)

The Australia A Team Quadrangular Series in 2014 was a List A cricket tournament that was held in Darwin, Australia, between the teams Australia A, India A, South Africa A and Australia's National Performance Squad. India A won the tournament after beating Australia A in the final.

== Squads ==
Australia A	India A	South Africa A	National Performance Squad
Cameron White (c); Cameron Boyce; Pat Cummins; Ben Cutting; Alex Doolan; Callum Ferguson; Josh Hazlewood; Moises Henriques; Phillip Hughes; Chris Lynn; Clint McKay; Mitchell Marsh; Peter Nevill (wk); Kane Richardson	Robin Uthappa (c); Unmukt Chand; Rishi Dhawan; Kedar Jadhav; Dhawal Kulkarni; Manish Pandey; Axar Patel; Parvez Rasool; Ambati Rayudu; Sanju Samson (wk); Karn Sharma; Mohit Sharma; Rahul Shukla; Manoj Tiwary; Jaydev Unadkat; Manan Vohra	Justin Ontong (c); Farhaan Behardien; Cody Chetty; Marchant de Lange; Simon Harmer; Beuran Hendricks; Reeza Hendricks; Rory Kleinveldt; Heino Kuhn (wk); Mangaliso Mosehle (wk); Aaron Phangiso; Kagiso Rabada; Rilee Rossouw; Mthokozisi Shezi; Vaughn van Jaarsveld	Jordan Silk (c in 3 matches); Alex Keath (c in 3 matches); Ashton Turner (c in 1 match); Sean Abbott; Tom Andrews; Cameron Bancroft; Jason Behrendorff; Alex Gregory; Travis Head; Simon Mackin; James Muirhead; Sam Rainbird; Gurinder Sandhu; Matthew Short; Kelvin Smith; Mark Steketee; Sean Willis

Ref:

== Points table ==
Pos	Team	Pld	W	L	T	NR	Pts	NRR
1	India A	6	5	1	0	0	23	0.618
2	Australia A (H)	6	4	2	0	0	17	0.586
3	South Africa A	6	2	4	0	0	8	-0.696
4	National Performance Squad	6	1	5	0	0	5	-0.479

Source: ESPNcricinfo
(H) Host

== Fixtures ==
=== Group stage ===
==== Round 1 ====
20 July 2014
Scorecard

Australia A 252/7 (50 overs)	v	India A 224 (46.2 overs)
Alex Doolan 96 (101); Dhawal Kulkarni 3/41 (10 overs)		Sanju Samson 81 (98); Kane Richardson 5/31 (8.2 overs)

Australia A won by 28 runs
Marrara Oval, Darwin
Umpires: John Ward (Aus) and Paul Wilson (Aus)

- India A won the toss and elected to field first.

20 July 2014
Scorecard

South Africa A 212/9 (50 overs)	v	National Performance Squad; 202/9 (50 overs)
Vaughn van Jaarsveld 58 (72); Sean Abbott 4/36 (10 overs)		Cameron Bancroft 54 (113); Farhaan Behardien 3/37 (8 overs)

South Africa A won by 10 runs
Northline Oval, Palmerston
Umpires: Simon Fry (Aus) and Sam Nogajski (Aus)

- South Africa A won the toss and elected to bat first.

22 July 2014
Scorecard

National Performance Squad; 252/8 (50 overs)	v	Australia A 200 (45.2 overs)
Cameron Bancroft 66 (60); Mitchell Marsh 2/60 (10 overs)		Alex Doolan 55 (79); Sean Abbott 3/22 (7.2 overs)

National Performance Squad won by 52 runs
Marrara Oval, Darwin
Umpires: Simon Fry (Aus) and Paul Wilson (Aus)

- National Performance Squad won the toss and elected to bat first.

22 July 2014
Scorecard

India A 326/7 (50 overs)	v	South Africa A 256 (47.1 overs)
Manoj Tiwary 93 (73); Marchant de Lange 5/64 (8 overs)		Reeza Hendricks 52 (68); Dhawal Kulkarni 5/54 (10 overs)

India A won by 70 runs
Gardens Oval, Darwin
Umpires: Mick Martell (Aus) and Simon Fry (Aus)

- India A won the toss and elected to bat first.

24 July 2014
Scorecard

South Africa A 160 (49.2 overs)	v	Australia A 161/4 (45.2 overs)
Heino Kuhn 30 (36); Ben Cutting 4/27 (10 overs)		Cameron White 68 (113); Aaron Phangiso 2/27 (10 overs)

Australia A won by 6 wickets
Northline Oval, Palmerston
Umpires: Sam Nogajski (Aus) and John Ward (Aus)

- Australia A won the toss and elected to field first.

24 July 2014
Scorecard

National Performance Squad; 217/9 (50 overs)	v	India A 218/4 (38 overs)
Travis Head 56 (69); Mohit Sharma 4/48 (10 overs)		Manan Vohra 88 (95); Jason Behrendorff 2/50 (9 overs)

India A won by 6 wickets
Gardens Oval, Darwin
Umpires: Mick Martell (Aus) and Paul Wilson (Aus)

- National Performance Squad won the toss and elected to bat first.

==== Round 2 ====
26 July 2014
Scorecard

National Performance Squad; 214 (44.5 overs)	v	Australia A 216/3 (42.1 overs)
Ashton Turner 59 (53); Mitchell Marsh 5/50 (10 overs)		Tom Cooper 109* (110); Sean Abbott 2/27 (9 overs)

Australia A won by 7 wickets
Marrara Oval, Darwin
Umpires: Gerard Abood (Aus) and John Ward (Aus)

- National Performance Squad won the toss and elected to bat first.

26 July 2014
Scorecard

South Africa A 275/8 (50 overs)	v	India A 276/9 (49.5 overs)
Rilee Rossouw 137 (150); Karn Sharma 2/35 (10 overs)		Unmukt Chand 53 (112); Marchant de Lange 3/71 (10 overs)

India A won by 1 wicket
Gardens Oval, Darwin
Umpires: Simon Fry (Aus) and Mick Martell (Aus)

- South Africa A won the toss and elected to bat first.

29 July 2014
Scorecard

Australia A 349/4 (50 overs)	v	South Africa A 201 (37.4 overs)
Phillip Hughes 202* (151); Mthokozisi Shezi 2/67 (10 overs)		Farhaan Behardien 67 (67); Kane Richardson 4/45 (6.4 overs)

Australia A won by 148 runs
Marrara Oval, Darwin
Umpires: Mick Martell (Aus) and Paul Wilson (Aus)

- South Africa A won the toss and elected to field first.

29 July 2014
Scorecard

National Performance Squad; 234/9 (50 overs)	v	India A 238/7 (39.5 overs)
Jordan Silk 67 (87); Rishi Dhawan 2/38 (8 overs)		Kedar Jadhav 87 (53); James Muirhead 4/92 (10 overs)

India A won by 3 wickets
Gardens Oval, Darwin
Umpires: Simon Fry (Aus) and John Ward (Aus)

- India A won the toss and elected to field first.

31 July 2014
Scorecard

Australia A 228 (49.4 overs)	v	India A 231/5 (47.5 overs)
Marcus Stoinis 58 (61); Manoj Tiwary 5/34 (10 overs)		Ambati Rayudu 77 (112); Clint McKay 1/19 (9 overs)

India A won by 5 wickets
Marrara Oval, Darwin
Umpires: Gerard Abood (Aus) and Paul Wilson (Aus)

- Australia A won the toss and elected to bat first.

31 July 2014
Scorecard

South Africa A 281/8 (50 overs)	v	National Performance Squad; 254 (50 overs)
Rilee Rossouw 74 (70); Jason Behrendorff 4/55 (9 overs)		Travis Head 108 (100); Mthokozisi Shezi 6/42 (10 overs)

South Africa A won by 27 runs
Gardens Oval, Darwin
Umpires: Simon Fry (Aus) and Mick Martell (Aus)

- South Africa A won the toss and elected to bat first.

=== 3rd Place play-off ===
2 August 2014
Scorecard

National Performance Squad; 252/9 (50 overs)	v	South Africa A 255/3 (38.3 overs)
Travis Head 60 (61); Hardus Viljoen 3/37 (10 overs)		Reeza Hendricks 90 (75); Alex Keath 2/15 (2 overs)

South Africa A won by 7 wickets
Gardens Oval, Darwin
Umpires: Mick Martell (Aus) and Paul Wilson (Aus)

- National Performance Squad won the toss and elected to bat first.

=== Final ===
2 August 2014
Scorecard

Australia A 274/5 (50 overs)	v	India A 275/6 (48.4 overs)
Cameron White 137 (150); Dhawal Kulkarni 3/51 (10 overs)		Kedar Jadhav 78 (73); Ben Cutting 3/46 (10 overs)

India A won by 4 wickets
Marrara Oval, Darwin
Umpires: Simon Fry (Aus) and John Ward (Aus)

- Australia A won the toss and elected to bat first.

== See also ==
- South Africa A Team Triangular Series in 2013
