= List of matches of the Australian Indigenous cricket team =

List of cricket matches played by the men's Australian Indigenous cricket team. This team has also been known as the Australian Aboriginal cricket team, Australian Indigenous XI and the ATSIC Chairperson's XI.

== List of matches ==
=== Matches 1–48 ===
No.	Date	Opposition team	Result	Competition
1	Dec 1866	Melbourne Cricket Club	MCC won by 7 wickets	–
2	25 May 1868	Surrey XI	Surrey won by an innings & 7 runs	Tour of England 1868
3	29 May 1868	Mote Park	Match drawn	Tour of England 1868
4	2 June 1868	Gentlemen of Kent	Gentlemen of Kent won by an innings and 69 runs	Tour of England 1868
5	5 June 1868	Richmond	Match drawn	Tour of England 1868
6	8 June 1868	Gentlemen of Sussex	Gentlemen of Sussex won by 9 wickets	Tour of England 1868
7	10 June 1868	Gentlemen of Lewisham	Australian Aboriginals won by 6 wickets	Tour of England 1868
8	12 June 1868	Marylebone Cricket Club	Marylebone Cricket Club won by 55 runs	Tour of England 1868
9	15 June 1868	East Hants Club	East Hants Club won by an innings and 9 runs	Tour of England 1868
10	19 June 1868	Bishop's Stortford	Bishop's Stortford won by 8 wickets	Tour of England 1868
11	22 June 1868	Hastings	Match drawn	Tour of England 1868
12	26 June 1868	Gentlemen of Halifax	Australian Aboriginals won by 7 wickets	Tour of England 1868
13	29 June 1868	Gentlemen of East Lancashire	Match drawn	Tour of England 1868
14	2 July 1868	Gentlemen of Rochdale	Gentlemen of Rochdale won by 77 runs	Tour of England 1868
15	6 July 1868	Gentlemen of Swansea	Australian Aboriginals won by an innings and 33 runs	Tour of England 1868
16	10 July 1868	Bradford	Match drawn	Tour of England 1868
17	13 July 1868	Gentlemen of Yorkshire	Gentlemen of Yorkshire won by an innings and 51 runs	Tour of England 1868
18	16 July 1868	Longsight	Longsight won by 4 wickets	Tour of England 1868
19	20 July 1868	Vulcan United and Bury Clubs	Match drawn	Tour of England 1868
20	23 July 1868	Carrow	Australian Aboriginals won by an innings and 52 runs	Tour of England 1868
21	27 July 1868	Keighley	Match drawn	Tour of England 1868
22	30 July 1868	Bootle	Australian Aboriginals won by 9 wickets	Tour of England 1868
23	3 August 1868	Nottingham Commercial Club	Match drawn	Tour of England 1868
24	7 August 1868	Longsight	Australian Aboriginals won by 107 runs	Tour of England 1868
25	10 August 1868	Gentlemen of Sheffield	Match drawn	Tour of England 1868
26	13 August 1868	Savile Club	Savile Club won by an innings and 58 runs	Tour of England 1868
27	17 August 1868	Tynemouth	Australian Aboriginals won by 2 wickets	Tour of England 1868
28	21 August 1868	Northumberland Club	Match drawn	Tour of England 1868
29	24 August 1868	Middlesbrough	Match drawn	Tour of England 1868
30	27 August 1868	Scarborough	Australian Aboriginals won by 10 wickets	Tour of England 1868
31	31 August 1868	Hunslet	Australian Aboriginals won by 7 wickets	Tour of England 1868
32	2nd Sept 1868	South Derbyshire	South Derbyshire won by 139 runs	Tour of England 1868
33	4th Sept 1868	Lincolnshire	Lincolnshire won by 10 runs	Tour of England 1868
34	7th Sept 1868	Burton-on-Trent	Australian Aboriginals won by 69 runs	Tour of England 1868
35	10th Sept 1868	Bootle	Australian Aboriginals won by 154 runs	Tour of England 1868
36	14th Sept 1868	Witham	Australian Aboriginals won by an innings and 43 runs	Tour of England 1868
37	17th Sept 1868	Gentlemen of Sussex	Match drawn	Tour of England 1868
38	21st Sept 1868	Blackheath	Blackheath won by 13 runs	Tour of England 1868
39	23rd Sept 1868	Gentlemen of Middlesex	Match drawn	Tour of England 1868
40	25th Sept 1868	Gentlemen of Surrey	Match drawn	Tour of England 1868
41	28th Sept 1868	Sporting Press	Match drawn	Tour of England 1868
42	30th Sept 1868	Eastbourne	Match drawn	Tour of England 1868
43	2 Oct 1868	Turnham Green	Match drawn	Tour of England 1868
44	5 Oct 1868	East Hants Club	Australian Aboriginals won by an innings and 61 runs	Tour of England 1868
45	7 Oct 1868	Gentlemen of Hampshire	Match drawn	Tour of England 1868
46	9 Oct 1868	Reading	Australian Aboriginals won by an innings and 218 runs	Tour of England 1868
47	12 Oct 1868	Godalming	Match drawn	Tour of England 1868
48	15 Oct 1868	Gentlemen of Surrey	Gentlemen of Surrey won by 9 wickets	Tour of England 1868

=== Matches 49–100 ===
No.	Date	Opposition team	Result	Competition
49	13 Jan 1988	Prime Minister's XI	Australian Aboriginals won by 7 wickets	–
50	14 May 1988	Surrey XI	unknown	Tour of England 1988
51	16 May 1988	Kent XI	unknown	Tour of England 1988
52	18 May 1988	Richmond	unknown	Tour of England 1988
53	19 May 1988	Australia House	unknown	Tour of England 1988
54	20 May 1988	Middlesex Cricket Union	unknown	Tour of England 1988
55	21 May 1988	Indian Gymkhana	unknown	Tour of England 1988
56	21 May 1988	Sussex Second XI	Sussex Second XI won by 5 wickets	Tour of England 1988
57	24 May 1988	Guildford Cricket Club President's XI	unknown	Tour of England 1988
58	25 May 1988	Mote	unknown	Tour of England 1988
59	27 May 1988	Farnham	unknown	Tour of England 1988
60	28 May 1988	Sport Aid Celebrity XI	unknown	Tour of England 1988
61	30 May 1988	Alderney	Australian Aboriginals won by 174 runs	Tour of England 1988
62	31 May 1988	Hampshire XI	unknown	Tour of England 1988
63	1 June 1988	Hampshire Cricket Association	unknown	Tour of England 1988
64	2 June 1988	Sutton, Cheam, Banstead and Mitcham Combined XI	unknown	Tour of England 1988
65	4 June 1988	Bath Schools	unknown	Tour of England 1988
66	6 June 1988	Glamorgan Second XI	Glamorgan Second XI won by 62 runs	Tour of England 1988
67	9 June 1988	Birmingham	unknown	Tour of England 1988
68	10 June 1988	Hudson's Hollywood XI	Hudson's Hollywood XI won by 117 runs	Tour of England 1988
69	11 June 1988	Middlesbrough Select XI	unknown	Tour of England 1988
70	13 June 1988	Lancashire	unknown	Tour of England 1988
71	16 June 1988	Chatsworth House XI	unknown	Tour of England 1988
72	18 June 1988	Humberside	unknown	Tour of England 1988
73	19 June 1988	Lincolnshire	Australian Aboriginals won by 114 runs	Tour of England 1988
74	22 June 1988	Oxford University	unknown	Tour of England 1988
75	25 June 1988	Combined Services	Australian Aboriginals won by 76 runs	Tour of England 1988
76	26 June 1988	CH Lloyd's London Community Cricket XI	Australian Aboriginals won by 7 runs	Tour of England 1988
77	28 June 1988	Marylebone Cricket Club	Match drawn	Tour of England 1988
78	9 Jan 1989	Prime Minister's XI	Australian Aboriginals won by 3 wickets	–
79	19 April 2001	Prime Minister's XI	ATSIC Chairman's XI won by 7 wickets	Johnny Mullagh Trophy 2000/01
80	25 Feb 2002	Indonesia	ACB Indigenous won by 66 runs	East Asia Eights 2001/02
81	25 Feb 2002	Japan	ACB Indigenous won by 6 wickets	East Asia Eights 2001/02
82	26 Feb 2002	South Korea	ACB Indigenous won by 143 runs	East Asia Eights 2001/02
83	26 Feb 2002	Indonesia	ACB Indigenous won by 4 wickets	East Asia Eights 2001/02
84	28 Feb 2002	Japan	ACB Indigenous won by 92 runs	East Asia Eights 2001/02
85	28 Feb 2002	South Korea	ACB Indigenous won by 131 runs	East Asia Eights 2001/02
86	1 March 2002	Japan	ACB Indigenous won by 5 wickets	East Asia Eights 2001/02 – Final
87	8 March 2002	Prime Minister's XI	Prime Minister's XI won by 8 wickets	Johnny Mullagh Trophy 2001/02
88	21 March 2003	Prime Minister's XI	Prime Minister's XI won by 8 wickets	Johnny Mullagh Trophy 2002/03
89	24 Jun 2009	Kent	Kent won by 8 wickets	Tour of England 2009
90	25 Jun 2009	Middlesex XI	Indigenous XI won by 4 runs	Tour of England 2009
91	29 Jun 2009	Home Counties	Indigenous XI won by 122 runs	Tour of England 2009
92	30 Jun 2009	MCC Combined Universities	Indigenous XI won by 2 runs	Tour of England 2009
93	2 July 2009	East Anglia	East Anglia won by 5 wickets	Tour of England 2009
94	3 July 2009	Essex	Indigenous XI won by 50 runs	Tour of England 2009
95	7 July 2009	Richmond	Match drawn	Tour of England 2009
96	8 July 2009	Surrey	Indigenous XI won by 24 runs	Tour of England 2009
97	9 July 2009	Southern Counties	Indigenous XI won by 1 run	Tour of England 2009
98	13 July 2009	Sussex	Indigenous XI won by 10 runs	Tour of England 2009
99	14 July 2009	Club Cricket Australia	Club Cricket Australia won by 153 runs	Tour of England 2009
100	15 July 2009	Hambledown Invitational	Indigenous XI won by 123 runs	Tour of England 2009

=== Match 101 – onwards ===
No.	Date	Opposition team	Result	Competition
101	16 Nov 2009	Australian Cricketers' Association Masters	Australian Cricketers' Association Masters won by 52 runs	–
102	9 May 2011	Australian Defence Force XI	Australian Indigenous XI won by 44 runs	2011 Arafura Games
103	9 May 2011	Air Niugini Crocs (Papua New Guinea)	Air Niugini Crocs won by 7 wickets	2011 Arafura Games
104	10 May 2011	Hebou Hammer (Papua New Guinea)	Australian Indigenous XI won by 3 runs	2011 Arafura Games
105	10 May 2011	Northern Territory High Performance XI	Australian Indigenous XI won by 17 runs	2011 Arafura Games
106	11 May 2011	SM Sains Raub (Malaysia)	Australian Indigenous XI won by 10 wickets	2011 Arafura Games
107	12 May 2011	Australian Defence Force XI	Australian Indigenous XI won by 316 runs	2011 Arafura Games
108	13 May 2011	Air Niugini Crocs (Papua New Guinea)	Air Niugini Crocs won by 10 wickets	2011 Arafura Games
109	14th Sept 2014	Papua New Guinea	Australian Indigenous XI won by 47 runs	Top End Cricket Carnival 2014/15
110	15th Sept 2014	Papua New Guinea	Australian Indigenous XI won by 7 wickets	Top End Cricket Carnival 2014/15
111	15th Sept 2014	Northern Territory	Northern Territory won by 1 wicket	Top End Cricket Carnival 2014/15
112	17th Sept 2014	East Asia Pacific	Australian Indigenous XI won by 5 wickets	Top End Cricket Carnival 2014/15
113	18th Sept 2014	East Asia Pacific	Australian Indigenous XI won by 6 wickets	Top End Cricket Carnival 2014/15
114	19th Sept 2014	East Asia Pacific	Australian Indigenous XI won by 7 wickets	Top End Cricket Carnival 2014/15
115	4 July 2015	Southern Stars	Australian Indigenous XI won by 238 runs	–
116	1 August 2016	National Performance Squad	ACB National Performance Squad won by 9 wickets	–
117	3 August 2016	Queensland XI	Australian Indigenous XI won by 2 runs	–
118	5 August 2016	National Performance Squad	ACB National Performance Squad won by 122 runs	–
119	8 August 2016	Queensland XI	Queensland XI won by 6 wickets	–
120	25 August 2017	Queensland XI	Queensland XI won by 63 runs	Results
121	27 August 2017	Papua New Guinea	Australian Indigenous XI won by 84 runs	Results
122	28 August 2017	National Performance Squad	ACB National Performance Squad won by 122 runs	Results
123	30 August 2017	Papua New Guinea	Tie	Results
124	3 September 2017	Papua New Guinea	Australian Indigenous XI won by 7 wickets	Results
125	5 September 2017	Papua New Guinea	Australian Indigenous XI won by 8 wickets	Results
126	7 September 2017	Victoria XI	Australian Indigenous XI won by 8 wickets	Results
–	9 September 2017	Victoria XI	Match abandoned	Results
127	5 June 2018	Marylebone Cricket Club	Australian Indigenous XI won by 21 runs	England tour 2018 Result
128	5 June 2018	Marylebone Cricket Club	Australian Indigenous XI won by 6 wickets	England tour 2018 Result
129	7 June 2018	Surrey	Australian Indigenous XI won by 6 runs	England tour 2018 Result
130	8 June 2018	Sussex	Sussex won by 99 runs	England tour 2018 Result
131	10 June 2018	Derbyshire	Australian Indigenous XI won	England tour 2018
132	12 June 2018	Nottinghamshire	Australian Indigenous XI won by 61 runs	England tour 2018 Result
133	5 May 2023	Vanuatu	Australian Indigenous XI won	2023 Vanuatu tour
134	6 May 2023	Vanuatu	Australian Indigenous XI won	2023 Vanuatu tour
135	8 May 2023	Vanuatu	Vanuatu won	2023 Vanuatu tour
136	9 May 2023	Vanuatu	Australian Indigenous XI won	2023 Vanuatu tour

=== Record ===
Played	Won	Draw	Tie	Lost	Unknown
136	61	23	1	32	19
