= English cricket team in Australia in 2013–14 =

England in Australia in 2013–14
	England	Australia
- Dates: 31 October 2013 – 2 February 2014
Captains	Alastair Cook (Tests and ODIs); Stuart Broad (T20Is)	Michael Clarke (Tests and ODIs); George Bailey (T20Is)

Test series
- Result: Australia won the 5-match series 5–0
Most runs	Kevin Pietersen (294)	David Warner (523)
Most wickets	Stuart Broad (21)	Mitchell Johnson (37)
- Player of the series: Compton–Miller Medal: Mitchell Johnson (Aus)

One Day International series
- Results: Australia won the 5-match series 4–1
Most runs	Eoin Morgan (282)	Aaron Finch (258)
Most wickets	Ben Stokes (10)	James Faulkner (11)
- Player of the series: Aaron Finch (Aus)

Twenty20 International series
- Results: Australia won the 3-match series 3–0
Most runs	Ravi Bopara (75)	Cameron White (174)
Most wickets	Stuart Broad (4)	Nathan Coulter-Nile (7)

The England cricket team toured Australia during the 2013–14 season from 31 October 2013 to 2 February 2014. The series included the traditional five Tests for The Ashes, and also featured five One Day Internationals (ODIs) and three T20 Internationals (T20Is).

Australia dominated all three formats on the tour, their only loss coming in the fourth ODI when England scored 316, the highest score of the ODI series. As a result of the tour, England's Test coach Andy Flower was relieved of his duties with the team, while batsman Kevin Pietersen was informed that he would no longer be considered for selection by the national team.

== Squads ==
Tests		ODIs		T20Is	
Australia	England	Australia	England	Australia	England
Michael Clarke (c); Brad Haddin (vc & wk); George Bailey; James Faulkner; Ryan Harris; Mitchell Johnson; Nathan Lyon; Chris Rogers; Peter Siddle; Steve Smith; David Warner; Shane Watson	Alastair Cook (c); James Anderson; Jonny Bairstow (wk); Ian Bell; Gary Ballance; Tim Bresnan; Stuart Broad; Michael Carberry; Steven Finn; Monty Panesar; Kevin Pietersen; Matt Prior (wk); Boyd Rankin; Joe Root; Graeme Swann; Ben Stokes; Chris Tremlett; Jonathan Trott; Scott Borthwick±; James Tredwell±	Michael Clarke (c); George Bailey; Nathan Coulter-Nile; Xavier Doherty; James Faulkner; Aaron Finch; Brad Haddin (wk); Mitchell Johnson; Shaun Marsh; Glenn Maxwell; Clint McKay; James Pattinson; David Warner; Shane Watson	Alastair Cook (c); Gary Ballance; Ian Bell; Ravi Bopara; Tim Bresnan; Danny Briggs; Stuart Broad; Jos Buttler (wk); Michael Carberry; Steven Finn; Chris Jordan; Eoin Morgan; Boyd Rankin; Joe Root; Ben Stokes; James Tredwell; Chris Woakes	George Bailey (c); Aaron Finch; Daniel Christian; Nathan Coulter-Nile; Ben Cutting; James Faulkner; Josh Hazlewood; Moises Henriques; Chris Lynn; Glenn Maxwell; James Muirhead; Mitchell Starc; Matthew Wade; Cameron White	Stuart Broad (c); Ravi Bopara; Tim Bresnan; Danny Briggs; Jos Buttler (wk); Jade Dernbach; Chris Jordan; Alex Hales; Michael Lumb; Eoin Morgan; Boyd Rankin; Joe Root; Ben Stokes; James Tredwell; Luke Wright

±Late addition

== Background ==
The two teams were meeting after a gap of less than six months. These back to back Ashes series were being staged after 38 years, reminiscent of the 1970s. The move was initiated keeping in mind the 2015 World Cup that Australia and New Zealand were to host. The previous edition of the Ashes was played in England in July 2013 with England emerging comfortable winners. England had won the previous three editions of the Ashes and were tipped to win this edition as well. They were looking to emulate a feat that had not been achieved since the 1890s, win four Ashes on the trot. Simply going by Australia's performances in the recent past, it was assumed that the result was a foregone conclusion. Australia's batting was clearly found wanting in the previous series and they had lost matches from seemingly comfortable situations, as was seen in Durham and Lord's. The series had was also shadowed by the controversy surrounding Stuart Broad's refusal to walk in the previous series after clearly edging Ashton Agar to Michael Clarke in the first test at Trent Bridge. He was dubbed a "smug, pommie cheat" by sections of the media and with coach Darren Lehman's unsavory comments, things were even more interesting.

== Tour matches ==
=== First-class: Western Australia Chairman's XI v England XI ===
31 October – 2 November 2013
Scorecard

Western Australia Chairman's XI	v	England XI
5/451d (108 overs); Chris Lynn 104 (124); Joe Root 1/32 (11 overs)		391 (101.5 overs); Ian Bell 115 (165); Jim Allenby 4/58 (22.5 overs)
5/168 (39 overs); Mitchell Marsh 62 (74); Boyd Rankin 2/34 (9 overs)

Match drawn
WACA Ground, Perth
Umpires: Mick Martell (Aus) and Paul Wilson (Aus)

- Western Australia Chairman's XI won the toss and elected to bat

The England team arrived in Australia in late October looking to get the tour off to a good start, but the Chairman's XI were more than a match for them. Chris Lynn was loaned to Western Australia by Queensland, overlooked for their Sheffield Shield clash being played at the same time. This move paid off as Lynn made a blistering 104, only his third first-class century as each of Western Australia's top four batsmen made half-centuries. England's fast-bowling trio of Chris Tremlett, Boyd Rankin and Steven Finn struggled for line and length on the WACA wicket and Chairman's XI declared at 5/451. England began to fight back however as Michael Carberry made 78 and both Jonathan Trott and Ian Bell made centuries, the former didn't get out and made 113 and the latter retired on 115. England were eventually bowled out for 391 and half-centuries to Mitchell Marsh and Lynn meant that the game ended in a draw.

=== First-class: Australia A v England XI ===
6–9 November 2013
Scorecard

England XI	v	Australia A
7/430d (128 overs); Alastair Cook 154 (272); Ben Cutting 2/75 (30 overs)		3/119 (31 overs); Alex Doolan 31 (35); James Anderson 2/20 (7 overs)

Match drawn
Bellerive Oval, Hobart
Umpires: Simon Fry (Aus) and Paul Wilson (Aus)

- England XI won the toss and elected to bat.
- No play was possible on Day 2 and 3 due to rain.

England turned things around against Australia A as the tourists piled on the runs. Australia A were luckless in the field as England's Michael Carberry and captain Alastair Cook each made 150 as England finished the first day on 318 without loss. The rain was relentless on Days 2 and 3, meaning no play was possible and the game was headed for a certain draw. Both Cook and Carberry retired ahead of Day 4, when Joe Root made 58 and Ben Cutting was the pick of the bowlers. England finally put Australia A out of their misery and declared at 7/430. Only 31 overs were bowled as Alex Doolan made 31 as another tour match went down as a draw.

=== First-class: Cricket Australia Invitational XI v England XI ===
13–16 November 2013
Scorecard

Cricket Australia Invitational XI	v	England XI
304 (103.4 overs); Ryan Carters 94 (200); Steven Finn 5/103 (28.4 overs)		418 (102.5 overs); Jonathan Trott 83 (105); James Muirhead 4/115 (22.5 overs)
261 (88.5 overs); Aaron Finch 59 (60); Boyd Rankin 3/46 (21 overs)		3/151 (38.4 overs); Michael Carberry 50 (71); James Muirhead 2/66 (14 overs)

England XI won by 7 wickets
Sydney Cricket Ground, Sydney
Umpires: Simon Fry (Aus) and Mick Martell (Aus)

- England XI won the toss and elected to field.

England were dominant early on against the Invitational XI taking 5/93 in just over 30 overs. Ed Cowan provided the only resistance with 51, until the New South Wales duo of Ryan Carters and Peter Nevill fought back with 94 and 83, respectively. The partnership was broken on Day 2 and the visitors were left chasing 304. They passed the total easily as Cook, Trott, Kevin Pietersen and Root all made half-centuries, despite James Muirhead's four wickets. Aaron Finch made a half-century as his side made 261 leaving England with 148 to win and Carberry's fifty ensured that England won by seven wickets.

=== Two-day: Cricket Australia Chairman's XI v England XI ===
29–30 November 2013
Scorecard

England XI	v	Cricket Australia Chairman's XI
7/212d (78 overs); Gary Ballance 55 (134); Simon Mackin 2/32 (16 overs)		8/254d (84.5 overs); Marcus Harris 49 (82); Graeme Swann 4/56 (23 overs)
1/47 (16 overs); Michael Carberry 37* (43); Simon Mackin 1/3 (5 overs)

Match drawn
Traeger Park, Alice Springs
Umpires: Simon Fry (Aus) and Mick Martell (Aus)

- Cricket Australia Chairman's XI won the toss and elected to field.

After losing the first test at The Gabba, the England side headed to Traeger Park in Alice Springs for a two-day game against the Cricket Australia Chairman's XI. In what proved to be a rough first day for England, Gary Ballance was the only man to pass 50 as the tourists made a modest 7/212 before declaring. Steven Cazzulino and Marcus Harris both fell short of half-centuries as the Chairman's XI declared at 8/254. England batted for only 16 more overs for 1/47, of which Carberry made 37 as yet another tour match finished in a draw.

=== 50-over: Prime Minister's XI v England XI ===
14 January 2014
14:20 (D/N)
Scorecard

England XI; 8/264 (50 overs)	v	Prime Minister's XI; 92 (26 overs)
Jos Buttler 61 (60); James Muirhead 3/52 (10 overs)		Brad Hodge 28 (42); Ravi Bopara 4/3 (3 overs)

England XI won by 172 runs
Manuka Oval, Canberra
Umpires: Gerard Abood (Aus) and Stuart Grocock (Aus)
Player of the match: Jos Buttler (EngXI)

- England XI won the toss and elected to bat.

Former Australia fast bowler Brett Lee was chosen to captain the Prime Minister's XI. This was substantiated as the 37-year-old took the wicket of England captain Alastair Cook. Gary Ballance and Jos Buttler both scored fifties as England made their way to 264. The England bowlers did the rest of the work, led by Ravi Bopara. Brad Hodge and ACT batsman Michael Spaseski provided the only resistance as the Prime Ministers' XI were bundled out for just 92.

== Test series ==
=== First Test ===
21–25 November 2013
Scorecard

Australia	v	England
295 (97.1 overs); Brad Haddin 94 (153); Stuart Broad 6/81 (24 overs)		136 (52.4 overs); Michael Carberry 40 (113); Mitchell Johnson 4/61 (17 overs)
7/401d (94 overs); David Warner 124 (154); Chris Tremlett 3/69 (17 overs)		179 (81.1 overs); Alastair Cook 65 (195); Mitchell Johnson 5/42 (21.1 overs)

Australia won by 381 runs
The Gabba, Brisbane
Umpires: Aleem Dar (Pak) and Kumar Dharmasena (SL)
Player of the match: Mitchell Johnson (Aus)

- Australia won the toss and elected to bat.
- George Bailey (Aus) made his Test debut.
- Kevin Pietersen (Eng) made his 100th Test appearance.

=== Second Test ===
5–9 December 2013
Scorecard

Australia	v	England
9/570d (158 overs); Michael Clarke 148 (243); Stuart Broad 3/98 (30 overs)		172 (68.2 overs); Ian Bell 72* (106); Mitchell Johnson 7/40 (17.2 overs)
3/132d (39 overs); David Warner 83* (117); James Anderson 2/19 (7 overs)		312 (101.4 overs); Joe Root 87 (194); Peter Siddle 4/57 (19 overs)

Australia won by 218 runs
Adelaide Oval, Adelaide
Umpires: Kumar Dharmasena (SL) and Marais Erasmus (SA)
Player of the match: Mitchell Johnson (Aus)

- Australia won the toss and elected to bat.
- Rain on Day 1 meant only 14.2 overs were possible before lunch; the lost overs were recovered before the end of the day.
- Ben Stokes (Eng) made his Test debut.

=== Third Test ===
13–17 December 2013
Scorecard

Australia	v	England
385 (103.3 overs); Steve Smith 111 (208); Stuart Broad 3/100 (22 overs)		251 (88 overs); Alastair Cook 72 (153); Peter Siddle 3/36 (16 overs)
6/369d (87 overs); David Warner 112 (140); Tim Bresnan 2/53 (14 overs)		353 (103.2 overs); Ben Stokes 120 (195); Mitchell Johnson 4/78 (25.2 overs)

Australia won by 150 runs
WACA Ground, Perth
Umpires: Billy Bowden (NZ) and Marais Erasmus (SA)
Player of the match: Steve Smith (Aus)

- Australia won the toss and elected to bat.
- Alastair Cook (Eng) made his 100th Test appearance.
- Michael Clarke (Aus) made his 100th Test appearance.

=== Fourth Test ===
26–30 December 2013
Scorecard

England	v	Australia
255 (100 overs); Kevin Pietersen 71 (161); Mitchell Johnson 5/63 (24 overs)		204 (82.2 overs); Brad Haddin 65 (68); James Anderson 4/67 (20.2 overs)
179 (61 overs); Alastair Cook 51 (91); Nathan Lyon 5/50 (17 overs)		2/231 (51.5 overs); Chris Rogers 116 (155); Monty Panesar 1/43 (7.5 overs)

Australia won by 8 wickets
Melbourne Cricket Ground, Melbourne
Umpires: Aleem Dar (Pak) and Kumar Dharmasena (SL)
Player of the match: Mitchell Johnson (Aus)

- Australia won the toss and elected to field.
- Monty Panesar (Eng), Shane Watson and Peter Siddle (both Aus) made their 50th Test appearances.
- 91,092 people attended the first day of the match, a new world record attendance for a Test match.

=== Fifth Test ===
3–7 January 2014
Scorecard

Australia	v	England
326 (76 overs); Steve Smith 115 (154); Ben Stokes 6/99 (19.5 overs)		155 (58.5 overs); Ben Stokes 47 (101); Peter Siddle 3/23 (13 overs)
276 (61.3 overs); Chris Rogers 119 (169); Scott Borthwick 3/33 (6 overs)		166 (31.4 overs); Michael Carberry 43 (63); Ryan Harris 5/25 (9.4 overs)

Australia won by 281 runs
Sydney Cricket Ground, Sydney
Umpires: Aleem Dar (Pak) and Marais Erasmus (SA)
Player of the match: Ryan Harris (Aus)

- England won the toss and elected to field.
- Gary Ballance, Scott Borthwick and Boyd Rankin (all Eng) made their Test debuts.

=== Statistics ===
==== Batting ====
Most runs

Player	Matches	Runs	Average	Highest
(Australia) David Warner	5	523	58.11	124
(Australia) Brad Haddin	5	493	61.62	118
(Australia) Chris Rogers	5	463	46.30	119
(Australia) Michael Clarke	5	363	40.33	148
(Australia) Shane Watson	5	345	38.33	103

==== Bowling ====
Most wickets

Player	Matches	Wickets	Runs	Econ	BBI
(Australia) Mitchell Johnson	5	37	517	2.74	7/40
(Australia) Ryan Harris	5	22	425	2.55	5/25
(England) Stuart Broad	5	21	578	3.57	6/81
(Australia) Nathan Lyon	5	19	558	3.16	5/50
(Australia) Peter Siddle	5	16	386	2.46	4/57

== ODI series ==
=== 1st ODI ===
12 January 2014
14:20 (D/N)
Scorecard

England; 7/269 (50 overs)	v	Australia; 4/270 (45.4 overs)
Gary Ballance 79 (96); Clint McKay 3/44 (10 overs)		Aaron Finch 121 (128); Joe Root 1/11 (2 overs)

Australia won by 6 wickets
Melbourne Cricket Ground, Melbourne
Umpires: Simon Fry (Aus) and Ranmore Martinesz (SL)
Player of the match: Aaron Finch (Aus)

- England won the toss and elected to bat.

England lost early wickets but Gary Ballance and Eoin Morgan both made half-centuries to steady the ship as England made 269. A 163 run-partnership between David Warner and Aaron Finch, during which the latter became the first Victorian to score an ODI hundred at the MCG, helped Australia cruise to a six-wicket win with 26 balls to spare.

=== 2nd ODI ===
17 January 2014
13:20 (D/N)
Scorecard

England; 8/300 (50 overs)	v	Australia; 9/301 (49.3 overs)
Eoin Morgan 106 (99); Glenn Maxwell 2/31 (8 overs)		James Faulkner 69* (47); Joe Root 2/46 (9 overs)

Australia won by 1 wicket
The Gabba, Brisbane
Umpires: Kumar Dharmasena (SL) and John Ward (Aus)
Player of the match: James Faulkner (Aus)

- England won the toss and elected to bat.

A remarkable match began well for the tourists. Ian Bell made a half-century, but Jos Buttler fell one short. The English continued to score frequently and Eoin Morgan blasted 106 as England reached 300. The Australians responded well, both Shaun Marsh and Glenn Maxwell scored fifties, but the Australians collapsed to 9/244 and a comeback seemed unlikely, with Australia requiring 57 runs in 6 overs with only one wicket in hand. However, James Faulkner, aided by tail-ender Clint McKay, calmly backed himself to find the required boundaries, which he did with regularity as he smashed the required 57 to carry Australia to a heart-stopping one-wicket victory with three balls to spare.

=== 3rd ODI ===
19 January 2014
13:20 (D/N)
Scorecard

England; 9/243 (50 overs)	v	Australia; 3/244 (40 overs)
Eoin Morgan 54 (58); Nathan Coulter-Nile 3/47 (10 overs)		David Warner 71 (70); Ravi Bopara 1/14 (5 overs)

Australia won by 7 wickets
Sydney Cricket Ground, Sydney
Umpires: Simon Fry (Aus) and Ranmore Martinesz (SL)
Player of the match: David Warner (Aus)

- England won the toss and elected to bat.

Alastair Cook's side won the toss on a pitch favouring the side batting first and made a swift start, yet were slowed down due to Australia's good bowling and fielding. Eoin Morgan was the only batsman to pass 50 for the tourists, his innings cut short by a return catch by Dan Christian amid some controversy. Although no Australian batsman made a hundred, fifties to David Warner and Shaun Marsh meant Australia finished with a seven-wicket victory to take an unassailable 3–0 lead in the series.

=== 4th ODI ===
24 January 2014
13:40 (D/N)
Scorecard

England; 8/316 (50 overs)	v	Australia; 259 (47.4 overs)
Jos Buttler 71 (43); James Faulkner 4/67 (10 overs)		Aaron Finch 108 (111); Ben Stokes 4/38 (9 overs)

England won by 57 runs
WACA Ground, Perth
Umpires: Kumar Dharmasena (SL) and John Ward (Aus)
Player of the match: Ben Stokes (Eng)

- Australia won the toss and elected to field.

On the 91st day of the tour, England finally beat Australia for the first and only time on the tour. Cook made 44, Buttler hit 71, 55 from Bell as well as 70 from Ben Stokes helped England reach 316. Despite 108 from Aaron Finch, the Australian chase was unsuccessful as England won by 57 runs.

=== 5th ODI ===
26 January 2014
13:50 (D/N)
Scorecard

Australia; 9/217 (50 overs)	v	England; 212 (49.4 overs)
George Bailey 56 (74); Stuart Broad 3/31 (10 overs)		Joe Root 55 (86); Nathan Coulter-Nile 3/34 (10 overs)

Australia won by 5 runs
Adelaide Oval, Adelaide
Umpires: Simon Fry (Aus) and Ranmore Martinesz (SL)
Player of the match: James Faulkner (Aus)

- Australia won the toss and elected to bat.

Australia started slowly, falling to 4/64 before a score of 56 from George Bailey helped them to 217 all out. Cook, Root and Morgan all scored well to take England close, but Ravi Bopara was unable to bring the team to victory, falling victim to an odd stumping by Matthew Wade, as the Australians won the game and the series.

=== Statistics ===
==== Batting ====
Most runs

Player	Matches	Runs	Average	Highest
(England) Eoin Morgan	5	282	56.40	106
(Australia) Aaron Finch	5	258	51.60	121
(England) Ian Bell	5	207	41.40	68
(Australia) Shaun Marsh	4	177	59.00	71*
(England) Jos Buttler	5	163	40.75	71

==== Bowling ====
Most wickets

Player	Matches	Wickets	Runs	Econ	BBI
(Australia) James Faulkner	5	11	280	6.08	4/67
(England) Ben Stokes	5	10	242	5.76	4/38
(Australia) Nathan Coulter-Nile	5	10	249	5.08	3/34
(England) Tim Bresnan	5	7	258	5.88	3/45
(Australia) Clint McKay	3	6	141	4.86	3/36

== T20I series ==
=== 1st T20I ===
29 January 2014
19:35 (D/N)
Scorecard

Australia; 4/213 (20 overs)	v	England; 9/200 (20 overs)
Cameron White 75 (43); Luke Wright 1/18 (1 over)		Ravi Bopara 65* (27); Nathan Coulter-Nile 4/30 (4 overs)

Australia won by 13 runs
Bellerive Oval, Hobart
Umpires: Simon Fry (Aus) and John Ward (Aus)
Player of the match: Cameron White (Aus)

- Australia won the toss and elected to bat.
- Chris Lynn and James Muirhead (both Aus) made their T20I debuts.

A 106-run partnership set the tone for Australia's dominance as Aaron Finch made 52 and a returning Cameron White made 75. Debutant Chris Lynn smashed 33 as the Australians reached 213 from their 20 overs. England lost wickets frequently and a quick-fire 65 from Ravi Bopara wasn't enough to prevent Australia from winning the game by 13 runs.

=== 2nd T20I ===
31 January 2014
19:35 (D/N)
Scorecard

England; 9/130 (20 overs)	v	Australia; 2/131 (14.5 overs)
Jos Buttler 22 (27); Josh Hazlewood 4/30 (4 overs)		George Bailey 60* (28); Tim Bresnan 1/11 (3 overs)

Australia won by 8 wickets
Melbourne Cricket Ground, Melbourne
Umpires: John Ward (Aus) and Paul Wilson (Aus)
Player of the match: Josh Hazlewood (Aus)

- England won the toss and elected to bat.

Good bowling from Josh Hazlewood and defensive fielding meant England could only reach 130, thanks in part to Jos Buttler, who top-scored with just 22. Cameron White again put on a show with 58 and Australia's captain George Bailey hit 60 to ensure the target was reached in less than 15 overs.

=== 3rd T20I ===
2 February 2014
19:35 (D/N)
Scorecard

Australia; 6/195 (20 overs)	v	England; 111 (17.2 overs)
George Bailey 49* (20); Stuart Broad 3/30 (4 overs)		Eoin Morgan 34 (20); James Muirhead 2/13 (2 overs)

Australia won by 84 runs
ANZ Stadium, Sydney
Umpires: Simon Fry (Aus) and Paul Wilson (Aus)
Player of the match: George Bailey (Aus)

- Australia won the toss and elected to bat.
- Chris Jordan (Eng) made his T20I debut.

Once again, Cameron White scored quickly and made 41 as cameos from Aaron Finch, Ben Cutting and 49 from George Bailey ensured the Australians made a big total of 195. 34 from Eoin Morgan was the only highlight for England as they slumped to just 111 giving the Australians a 3–0 series victory.
