= Kelvin Smith (cricketer) =

Australian cricketer (born 1994)

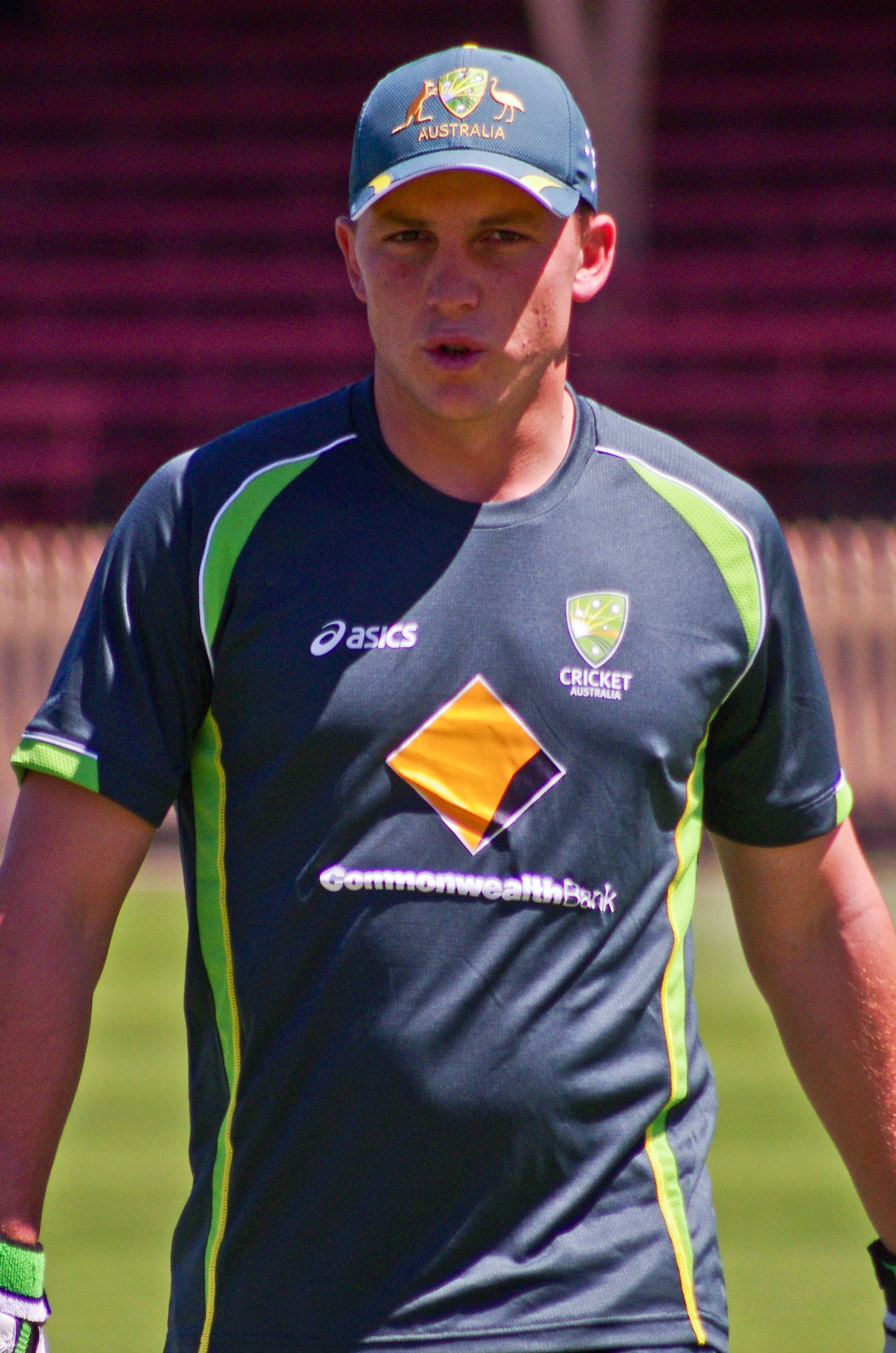

Personal information
- Full name: Kelvin Ross Smith
- Born: 5 September 1994 (age 32)
- Batting: Left-handed
- Bowling: Right-arm off break
- Role: Batsman

Domestic team information
- Years: Team
- 2013/14–2018/19: South Australia (squad no. 20)
- 2014/15–2016/17: Adelaide Strikers (squad no. 19)
- 2018/19: Melbourne Renegades
- FC debut: 30 October 2013 South Australia v Queensland
- LA debut: 22 July 2014 National Performance Squad v South Africa A

Career statistics
Competition	FC	LA	T20
Matches	24	6	4
Runs scored	894	114	50
Batting average	19.86	19.00	25.00
100s/50s	0/4	0/0	0/0
Top score	75	44	41*
Balls bowled	36	–	12
Wickets	0	–	1
Bowling average	–	–	24.00
5 wickets in innings	–	–	0
10 wickets in match	–	–	0
Best bowling	–	–	1/17
Catches/stumpings	5/–	1/–	2/–
- Source: ESPNcricinfo, 18 March 2023

Kelvin Ross Smith (born 5 September 1994) is a cricketer who played for South Australia, Adelaide Strikers and Melbourne Renegades. He made his first-class debut on 30 October 2013 for South Australia against Queensland and played a series of List A matches for the National Performance Squad in 2014. He is the younger brother of fellow cricketer James Smith.

== Domestic career ==
Smith made his first-class debut at the age of 19 in a Sheffield Shield match against Queensland on 30 October 2013. He batted at number 5 with and made scores of 1 and 12. In three matches during the season he scored 100 runs at an average of 20.00, including his maiden first-class fifty against Western Australia. In 2014 Smith was part of the National Performance Squad, playing five matches in the Australia A Team Quadrangular Series. He was named as the Adelaide Strikers' community rookie for BBL|04, but after an injury to pace bowler Chadd Sayers he was promoted to the senior list. He made his Big Bash League debut in January 2015 against the Melbourne Renegades with a solid 41 runs not out from 34 balls to help the Strikers win the match. He then regained his spot in South Australia's Sheffield Shield side for the remaining five matches of the season. He scores two fifties and averaged 28.10. At the age of 19 he also became the youngest ever captain of the West Torrens Cricket Club.

Smith signed a two-year contract with the Strikers for the 2015–16 and 2016–17 seasons. He only played three Sheffield Shield matches in the 2015-2016 season scoring 103 runs with an average of 17.16 and playing the rest of the season in the Futures League where he averaged 31.22. He didn't play any matches in BBL|05.

Smith prepared for the 2016–17 season in the West End Premier League playing for the Western Grit and scoring a century against the Northern Territory Strike. He made his mark early in the season proper with a double century in the opening match of the Futures League against the ACT side, after which he opened the batting with Jake Weatherald in the first half of the 2016–17 Sheffield Shield season, getting his highest score for the season with a 62 against Tasmania. He had poor form, only averaging 22.25 runs per innings, and in his only match for BBL|06 he was out for a 3-ball duck. He went back to the Futures League and scored a century in his first match back against Tasmania, finishing the tournament with an average over 50. After many years of good form in SACA Premier cricket and achieving the highest batting aggregate for the 1st grade competition in 2022-2023 season Smith was recontracted to the South Australian Redbacks in the 2023-2024 season.
