= South African cricket team in Australia in 2018–19 =

International cricket tour

	Australia	South Africa
- Dates: 31 October – 17 November 2018
Captains	Aaron Finch	Faf du Plessis

One Day International series
- Results: South Africa won the 3-match series 2–1
Most runs	Shaun Marsh (128)	David Miller (192)
Most wickets	Marcus Stoinis (8)	Dale Steyn (7); Kagiso Rabada (7)
- Player of the series: David Miller (SA)

Twenty20 International series
- Results: South Africa won the 1-match series 1–0
Most runs	Glenn Maxwell (38)	Faf du Plessis (27)
Most wickets	Nathan Coulter-Nile (2); Andrew Tye (2)	Lungi Ngidi (2); Chris Morris (2); Andile Phehlukwayo (2)

The South Africa cricket team toured Australia in October and November 2018 to play three One Day Internationals (ODIs) and one Twenty20 International (T20I) match. Ahead of the ODI series, a 50-over practice match took place at the Manuka Oval in Canberra. Ahead of the T20I match, a 20-over practice match took place in Brisbane. In April 2018, it was confirmed that the Carrara Stadium would host its first ever international cricket match.

Prior to the tour, Aaron Finch replaced Tim Paine as captain, and both Josh Hazlewood and Alex Carey were appointed joint vice-captains of the Australia ODI cricket team. The final ODI of the series was the 600th to be played by the South African team. South Africa won the ODI series 2–1. The one-off T20I match was reduced to ten overs per side due to rain, with South Africa winning the fixture by 21 runs.

== Squads ==
ODIs		T20I	
Australia	South Africa	Australia	South Africa
Aaron Finch (c); Josh Hazlewood (vc); Alex Carey (vc, wk); Ashton Agar; Nathan Coulter-Nile; Pat Cummins; Travis Head; Chris Lynn; Shaun Marsh; Glenn Maxwell; Ben McDermott; D'Arcy Short; Mitchell Starc; Marcus Stoinis; Adam Zampa	Faf du Plessis (c); Farhaan Behardien; Quinton de Kock (wk); Reeza Hendricks; Heinrich Klaasen; Aiden Markram; David Miller; Chris Morris; Lungi Ngidi; Andile Phehlukwayo; Dwaine Pretorius; Kagiso Rabada; Tabraiz Shamsi; Dale Steyn; Imran Tahir	Aaron Finch (c); Alex Carey (vc, wk); Ashton Agar; Jason Behrendorff; Nathan Coulter-Nile; Chris Lynn; Glenn Maxwell; Ben McDermott; D'Arcy Short; Billy Stanlake; Marcus Stoinis; Andrew Tye; Adam Zampa	Faf du Plessis (c); Farhaan Behardien; Quinton de Kock (wk); Reeza Hendricks; Heinrich Klaasen; Aiden Markram; David Miller; Chris Morris; Lungi Ngidi; Andile Phehlukwayo; Dwaine Pretorius; Kagiso Rabada; Tabraiz Shamsi; Dale Steyn; Imran Tahir

Ahead of the tour, JP Duminy and Hashim Amla were both ruled out of South Africa's squads due to injury. Ahead of the second ODI, Ben McDermott was added to Australia's ODI squad as cover for Shaun Marsh.

== Tour matches ==
=== 50 over match: Prime Minister's XI vs South Africa ===
31 October 2018
13:50 (D/N)
Scorecard

South Africa; 173 (42 overs)	v	(Australia) Prime Minister's XI; 6/174 (36.3 overs)
Aiden Markram 47 (51); Usman Qadir 3/28 (10 overs)		Josh Philippe 57 (53); Lungi Ngidi 2/16 (6 overs)

Prime Minister's XI won by 4 wickets
Manuka Oval, Canberra
Umpires: Shawn Craig (Aus) and Simon Fry (Aus)
Player of the match: Josh Philippe (Prime Minister's XI)

- South Africa won the toss and elected to bat.

=== 20 over match: Cricket Australia XI vs South Africa ===
14 November 2018
14:00
Scorecard

South Africa; 5/201 (20 overs)	v	Cricket Australia XI; 7/160 (20 overs)
Aiden Markram 45 (26); Gurinder Sandhu 1/18 (3 overs)		Alex Ross 40 (35); Chris Morris 2/35 (4 overs)

South Africa won by 41 runs
Allan Border Field, Brisbane
Umpires: Gerard Abood (Aus) and Phillip Gillespie (Aus)
Player of the match: Aiden Markram (SA)

- South Africa won the toss and elected to bat.

== ODI series ==
=== 1st ODI ===
4 November 2018
11:20
Scorecard

Australia; 152 (38.1 overs)	v	South Africa; 4/153 (29.2 overs)
Nathan Coulter-Nile 34 (31); Andile Phehlukwayo 3/33 (6 overs)		Quinton de Kock 47 (40); Marcus Stoinis 3/16 (4.2 overs)

South Africa won by 6 wickets
Perth Stadium, Perth
Umpires: Aleem Dar (Pak) and Simon Fry (Aus)
Player of the match: Dale Steyn (SA)

- South Africa won the toss and elected to field.
- Imran Tahir (SA) took his 150th wicket in ODIs.

=== 2nd ODI ===
9 November 2018
13:50 (D/N)
Scorecard

Australia; 231 (48.3 overs)	v	South Africa; 9/224 (50 overs)
Alex Carey 47 (72); Kagiso Rabada 4/54 (9.3 overs)		David Miller 51 (71); Marcus Stoinis 3/35 (10 overs)

Australia won by 7 runs
Adelaide Oval, Adelaide
Umpires: Gerard Abood (Aus) and Michael Gough (Eng)
Player of the match: Aaron Finch (Aus)

- South Africa won the toss and elected to field.

=== 3rd ODI ===
11 November 2018
13:50 (D/N)
Scorecard

South Africa; 5/320 (50 overs)	v	Australia; 9/280 (50 overs)
David Miller 139 (108); Mitchell Starc 2/57 (10 overs)		Shaun Marsh 106 (102); Kagiso Rabada 3/40 (10 overs)

South Africa won by 40 runs
Bellerive Oval, Hobart
Umpires: Aleem Dar (Pak) and Paul Wilson (Aus)
Player of the match: David Miller (SA)

- Australia won the toss and elected to field.
- Faf du Plessis (SA) scored his 10th century in ODIs.
- Faf du Plessis and David Miller made the highest partnership for South Africa against Australia in ODIs (252).

== T20I match ==
=== Only T20I ===
17 November 2018
18:20 (N)
Scorecard

South Africa; 6/108 (10 overs)	v	Australia; 7/87 (10 overs)
Faf du Plessis 27 (15); Andrew Tye 2/18 (2 overs)		Glenn Maxwell 38 (23); Chris Morris 2/12 (2 overs)

South Africa won by 21 runs
Carrara Stadium, Gold Coast
Umpires: Gerard Abood (Aus) and Paul Wilson (Aus)
Player of the match: Tabraiz Shamsi (SA)

- Australia won the toss and elected to field.
- The match was reduced to 10 overs per side due to rain.
- This was the first international cricket match to be played at this venue.
