= Kyle Gardiner =

Australian cricketer (born 1996)

Personal information
- Full name: Kyle Jayden Gardiner
- Born: 8 December 1996 (age 29); Bunbury, Western Australia
- Batting: Right-handed
- Bowling: Right-arm leg break
- Role: Bowler

Career statistics
Competition	List A
Matches	3
Runs scored	1
Batting average	–
100s/50s	0/0
Top score	1*
Balls bowled	102
Wickets	2
Bowling average	60.00
5 wickets in innings	0
10 wickets in match	0
Best bowling	2/57
Catches/stumpings	1/–
- Source: ESPNcricinfo, 5 October 2021

Kyle Gardiner (born 8 December 1996) is an Australian cricketer. He is a right-handed batsman and right-arm leg-spin bowler. He made his List A debut for the National Performance Squad against Australia A on 16 August 2016.
