= Prime Minister's XI =

Invitational cricket team picked by the Prime Minister of Australia

Coordinates: 35.318°S 149.135°E

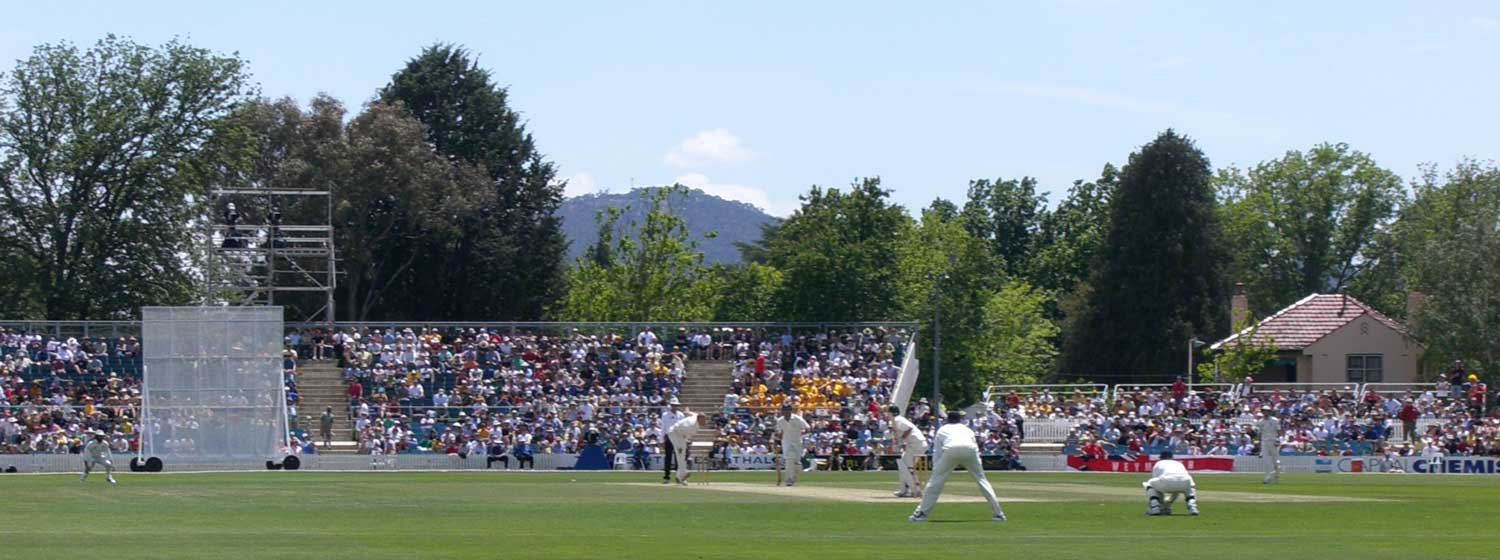
- The Prime Minister's XI in 2006

Personnel
- Captain: Peter Handscomb (2025)

Team information
- Established: 1951
- Home ground: Manuka Oval, Canberra

The Prime Minister's XI or PM's XI (formerly Australian Prime Minister's Invitation XI) is an invitational cricket team picked by the Prime Minister of Australia—assisted by the Australian national selectors. They play once a year as a warm-up match to an official test match. All matches are held at Manuka Oval in Canberra against an overseas touring team.

== History ==
In 1962–63, Sir Donald Bradman came out of retirement to play for the Prime Minister's XI against the Marylebone Cricket Club. It was the last time Bradman ever played competitive cricket, and he was freakishly bowled by Brian Statham for just four runs. When Bradman returned to the pavilion, he told then-Prime Minister Robert Menzies, "It wouldn't happen in a thousand years. Anyway, that's my final appearance at the wicket."

In 2003, there was a match between the PM's XI and an ATSIC Chairperson's XI held at Adelaide Oval.

The match on 2 December 2005 had to end early due to the Canberra storms, with Australia getting 4/316, and West Indies finishing in the 31st over at 3/174. The PM's XI won by six runs using the Duckworth-Lewis method, the first time in the fixture's history to be decided using the method.

In 2014, the Prime Minister's XI suffered the biggest defeat in the history of the match against England after being bowled out for just 92.

== List of matches ==
Date(s)	Prime Minister	Opposition team	Format	Result/winner	Result/margin
27 Oct 1951	Robert Menzies	West Indies	One day match	Match drawn	
8 Dec 1954	Robert Menzies	Marylebone CC XI	One day match	Marylebone CC XI	31 runs
10 Feb 1959	Robert Menzies	Marylebone CC XI	One day match	Marylebone CC XI	4 wickets
18 Feb 1961	Robert Menzies	West Indies	One day match	Match tied	
6 Feb 1963	Robert Menzies	Marylebone CC XI	One day match	Marylebone CC XI	4 runs
3 Feb 1964	Robert Menzies	South Africa	One day match	(Australia) Prime Minister's XI	1 wicket
17 Dec 1965	Robert Menzies	Marylebone CC XI	One day match	Marylebone CC XI	2 wickets
24 Jan 1984	Bob Hawke	West Indies	One day match	(Australia) Prime Minister's XI	52 runs
22 Jan 1985	Bob Hawke	West Indies	One day match	(Cricket West Indies) West Indies	15 runs
22 Jan 1986	Bob Hawke	New Zealand	One day match	No result (Note: Rain intervened / stopped play)	
23 Dec 1986	Bob Hawke	England	One day match	England XI	4 wickets
23 Dec 1987	Bob Hawke	New Zealand	One day match	New Zealand	37 runs
13 Jan 1988	Bob Hawke	Aboriginal XI	One day match	Aboriginal XI	7 wickets
8 Dec 1988	Bob Hawke	West Indies	One day match	Match abandoned	
9 Jan 1989	Bob Hawke	Aboriginal XI	One day match	Aboriginal XI	3 wickets
31 Jan 1990	Bob Hawke	Pakistan	One day match	(Australia) Prime Minister's XI	81 runs
4 Dec 1990	Bob Hawke	England	One day match	(Australia) Prime Minister's XI	31 runs
17 Dec 1991	Bob Hawke	India	One day match	(Australia) Prime Minister's XI	75 runs
12 Nov 1992	Paul Keating	West Indies	One day match	Prime Minister's XI	3 runs
2 Dec 1993	Paul Keating	South Africa	One day match	(Australia) Prime Minister's XI	4 runs
9 Nov 1994	Paul Keating	England	One day match	(Australia) Prime Minister's XI	2 wickets
5 Dec 1995	Paul Keating	West Indies	One day match	Match abandoned	
10 Dec 1996	John Howard	West Indies	One day match	(Australia) Prime Minister's XI	58 runs
2 Dec 1997	John Howard	South Africa	One day match	South Africa	11 runs
17 Dec 1998	John Howard	England	One day match	England XI	16 runs
7 Dec 1999	John Howard	India	One day match	(Australia) Prime Minister's XI	164 runs
7 Dec 2000	John Howard	West Indies	One day match	(Australia) Prime Minister's XI	4 wickets
19 Apr 2001	John Howard	ATSIC Chairman's XI	One day match	ATSIC Chairman's XI	7 wickets
6 Dec 2001	John Howard	New Zealand	One day match	New Zealand	4 wickets
8 Mar 2002	John Howard	ATSIC Chairman's XI	One day match	(Australia) Prime Minister's XI	8 wickets
10 Dec 2002	John Howard	England	One day match	(Australia) Prime Minister's XI	4 wickets
21 Mar 2003	John Howard	ATSIC Chairman's XI	One day match	(Australia) Prime Minister's XI	8 wickets
28 Jan 2004	John Howard	India	One day match	India	1 run
25 Jan 2005	John Howard	Pakistan	One day match	Pakistan	5 wickets
2 Dec 2005	John Howard	West Indies	One day match	(Australia) Prime Minister's XI	6 runs (DLS)
10 Nov 2006	John Howard	England	One day match	(Australia) Prime Minister's XI	166 runs
30 Jan 2008	Kevin Rudd	Sri Lanka	One day match	Sri Lanka	4 wickets
29 Jan 2009	Kevin Rudd	New Zealand	One day match	(Australia) Prime Minister's XI	6 wickets
4 Feb 2010	Kevin Rudd	West Indies	One day match	(Cricket West Indies) West Indies	90 runs (DLS)
10 Jan 2011	Julia Gillard	England	One day match	England	7 wickets (DLS)
3 Feb 2012	Julia Gillard	Sri Lanka	One day match	Match abandoned	
29 Jan 2013	Julia Gillard	West Indies	One day match	(Australia) Prime Minister's XI	23 runs
14 Jan 2014	Tony Abbott	England	One day match	England	172 runs
14 Jan 2015	Tony Abbott	England	One day match	England	60 runs
23 Oct 2015	Malcolm Turnbull	New Zealand	One day match	New Zealand	102 runs
15 Feb 2017	Malcolm Turnbull	Sri Lanka	One day match	Sri Lanka	5 wickets
31 Oct 2018	Scott Morrison	South Africa	One day match	(Australia) Prime Minister's XI	4 wickets
24 Oct 2019	Scott Morrison	Sri Lanka	One day match	(Australia) Prime Minister's XI	1 wicket
23–26 Nov 2022	Anthony Albanese	West Indies	Four day match	Match drawn	
6–9 Dec 2023	Anthony Albanese	Pakistan	Four day match	Match drawn	
30 Nov–1 Dec 2024	Anthony Albanese	India	Two day match	India	6 wickets
29–30 Nov 2025	Anthony Albanese	England Lions	Two day match	England Lions	8 wickets

== Results by Prime Minister and Party ==
Party	Played	Won	Lost	Drawn	Abandoned	Win percentage
Labor	24	9	9	2	4	37.5
Liberal	27	11	14	1	0	40.7

Prime Minister	Played	Won	Lost	Drawn	Win percentage	In Office
Robert Menzies	7	1	4	1	14.3	1939–1941, 1949–66
Bob Hawke	11	4	4	0	36.4	1983–91
Paul Keating	4	3	0	0	75	1991–96
John Howard	14	8	6	0	57.1	1996–2007
Kevin Rudd	3	1	2	0	33.3	2007–2010, 2013
Julia Gillard	3	1	1	0	33.3	2010–2013
Tony Abbott	2	0	2	0	0	2013–2015
Malcolm Turnbull	2	0	2	0	0	2015–2018
Scott Morrison	2	2	0	0	100	2018–2022
Anthony Albanese	4	0	2	2	0	2022–present

== Matches against MCC ==
=== Prime Minister's XI vs MCC 1954–55 ===
8 December 1954
scorecard

MCC	v	Prime Minister's XI
278/7 (dec); P.B.H. May 101; Graveney, T.W. 56; A. L. Hassett (c) 2/34		247; R. Benaud 113; Wardle, J.H. 4/73; Hutton, L. (c) 3/15; J.V. Wilson 3 Ct

MCC won by 31 runs
Manuka Oval, Canberra, Australia

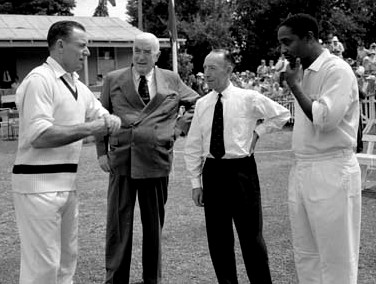
From left to right: Ray Lindwall, Australian Prime Minister Robert Menzies, Lindsay Hassett and Frank Worrell.

=== Prime Minister's XI vs MCC 1958–59 ===
10 February 1959
scorecard

Prime Minister's XI	v	MCC
288/6 (dec); B. James 88 retired hurt A.R. Morris 79; Graveney, T.W. 2/38; Laker, J.C. 2/61		332; M.C. Cowdrey (vc) 101; E.R. Dexter 76; A.R. Morris 4/46

MCC won by 4 wickets
Manuka Oval, Canberra, Australia

=== Prime Minister's XI vs MCC 1962–63 ===
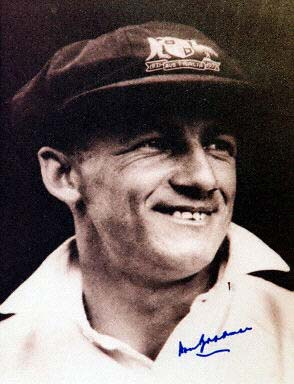
Sir Donald Bradman came out of retirement to play for the Prime Minister's XI, the last time he ever batted; "that's my final appearance at the wicket."

6 February 1963
scorecard

MCC	v	Australian Prime Minister's XI
253/7 (dec); D.S. Sheppard 72; R. Benaud 2/62		250; R. Benaud 68; Allen, D.A. 5/68; D.S. Sheppard 3 Ct

MCC win by 3 runs
Manuka Oval, Canberra, Australia
Umpires: G.F. Connelly (AUS) and J.G. Humphries (AUS)

=== Prime Minister's XI vs MCC 1965–66 ===
17 December 1965
scorecard

Prime Minister's XI	v	MCC
288/7 (dec); A.P. Sheahan 79; J.W. Burke 60; I.J. Jones 2/21		289/8; G. Boycott 95; M.C. Cowdrey (vc) 52; M.J.K. Smith (c) 51*; J.W. Burke 2/5

MCC win by 2 wickets
Manuka Oval, Canberra, Australia
Umpires: B.M Chapman (AUS) and G. Connolly (AUS)

== Governor-General's XI ==
In 2016, an annual Governor-General's XI was introduced for women cricketers, inspired by the prime-minister's XI. It was first instigated by governor-general Peter Cosgrove, who offered to support such a match after hearing that no prime minister's XI existed for female cricket. The first match was a Twenty20 match held at Drummoyne Oval against India.
