= Sam Grimwade =

Australian cricketer (born 1997)

Personal information
- Full name: Sam Edward James Grimwade
- Born: 16 December 1997 (age 28); Victoria, Australia
- Batting: Right-handed
- Bowling: Right-arm off break
- Role: Bowler

Domestic team information
- Years: Team
- 2016/17: Cricket Australia XI

Career statistics
Competition	LA
Matches	5
Runs scored	3
Batting average	—
100s/50s	0/0
Top score	2*
Balls bowled	96
Wickets	1
Bowling average	119.00
5 wickets in innings	0
10 wickets in match	0
Best bowling	1/11
Catches/stumpings	2/–
- Source: ESPNcricinfo, 4 October 2021

Sam Edward James Grimwade (born 16 December 1997) is an Australian cricketer. He is a right-handed batsman and right-arm off-spin bowler. He made his List A debut for National Performance Squad against Australia A on 16 August 2016.
