= John Rogers (cricketer, born 1987) =

Australian cricketer

Personal information
- Full name: John William Rogers
- Born: 11 April 1987 (age 39); Bruce, Australian Capital Territory
- Batting: Left-handed
- Bowling: Left-arm medium
- Role: Batsman

Domestic team information
- Years: Team
- 2009/10: Tasmania
- 2012/13–2013/14: Western Australia

Career statistics
Competition	FC	List A	T20
Matches	11	9	3
Runs scored	447	158	45
Batting average	21.28	19.75	15.00
100s/50s	0/2	0/1	0/0
Top score	95	68	24
Balls bowled	6	–	–
Wickets	0	–	–
Bowling average	–	–	–
5 wickets in innings	–	–	–
10 wickets in match	–	–	–
Best bowling	–	–	–
Catches/stumpings	13/–	0/–	0/–
- Source: CricketArchive, 29 August 2020

John William Rogers (born 11 April 1987) is an Australian cricketer who has played domestically for Tasmania and Western Australia.

== Biography ==
Born in Canberra, Rogers was educated at Daramalan College, and played underage cricket for the Australian Capital Territory at both under-17 and under-19 level. Playing as a top-order batsman, he made his debut for the territory's senior team in the Cricket Australia Cup during the 2005–06 season, playing against other states' second XIs. For the 2008–09 season, Rogers was given a rookie contract by the Tasmanian Cricket Association (TCA), in part due to an innings of 98 runs scored for an ACT Invitational XI against the touring Indian national cricket team the previous season. Restricted to playing second XI (and later under-23) matches for the majority of his first two seasons, he did not make his state debut until late in the 2009–10 season, playing a Sheffield Shield match against Queensland, as well as three Twenty20 matches in the KFC Twenty20 Big Bash.

Having lost his Tasmanian contract for the 2012–13 season, Rogers moved across the country to Western Australia, where he was named in the Western Australian Cricket Association's development squad. He made his debut for the state team in a Shield match against New South Wales in January 2013. In early February 2013, against Queensland at the Gabba, Rogers scored 89 runs in Western Australia's first innings, his highest score (and only half-century) at first-class level. This included a 123-run partnership with Sam Whiteman (51). At WACA district level, Rogers plays for Wanneroo District Cricket Club, having previously played TCA grade cricket for the North Hobart Cricket Club.
