= Tom O'Donnell (cricketer) =

Australian cricketer

Personal information
- Full name: Thomas James O'Donnell
- Born: 23 October 1996 (age 30); Malvern, Victoria, Australia
- Batting: Right-handed
- Bowling: Left-arm medium
- Role: Bowler
- Relatives: Simon O'Donnell (father)

Domestic team information
- Years: Team
- 2016: Australian NPS
- 2016/17: Cricket Australia XI
- 2022/23: Victoria

Career statistics
Competition	List A
Matches	8
Runs scored	45
Batting average	11.25
100s/50s	0/0
Top score	28*
Balls bowled	334
Wickets	9
Bowling average	42.88
5 wickets in innings	0
10 wickets in match	0
Best bowling	4/28
Catches/stumpings	1/–
- Source: ESPNcricinfo, 15 October 2023

Thomas James O'Donnell (born 23 October 1996) is an Australian cricketer. O'Donnell is a right-handed batsman who bowls left-arm medium. He was born in Malvern, Victoria.

He made his List A debut for the Australian National Performance Squad against India A in August 2016. He played two further matches for Performance Squad. In October 2016, he played four matches for the Cricket Australia XI in the 2016–17 Matador BBQs One-Day Cup. He plays club cricket for Essendon.

He is the son of former Australian and Victorian all-rounder Simon O'Donnell.
