= Partners in the Blue Pacific =

International partnership

The Partners in the Blue Pacific (PBP) is an informal group aimed at boosting economic and diplomatic ties with Pacific island nations. The group consists of the United States and its allies. The PBP was announced on 24 June 2022 by the United States White House after consultations with Pacific Heads of Mission and other partners, including France, as well as the European Union

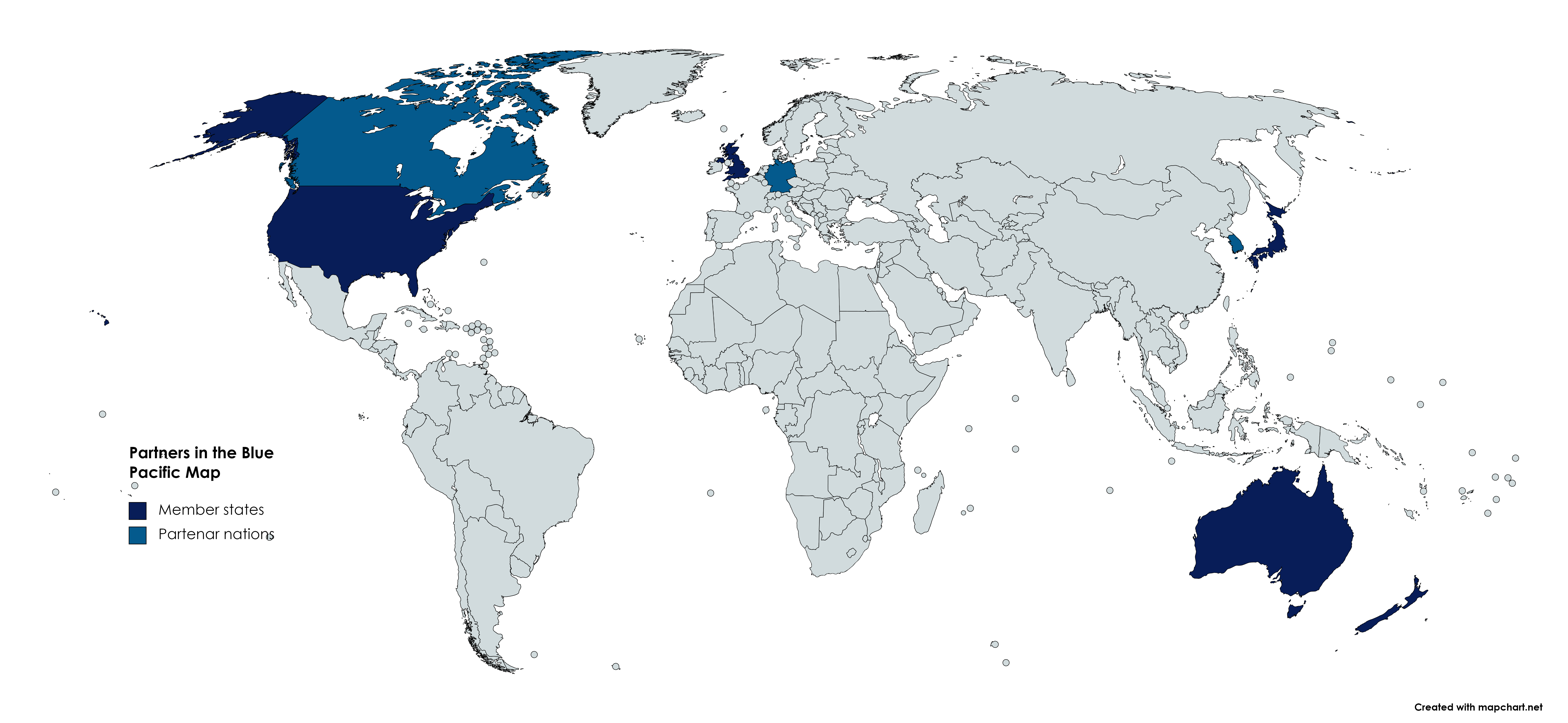
Partners in the Blue Pacific Map

The aims of the informal group are:

- Deliver results for the Pacific more effectively and efficiently
- Bolster Pacific regionalism
- Expand opportunities for cooperation between the Pacific and the world

== Member states ==
PBP has five member states.

- Australia
- Japan
- New Zealand
- United Kingdom
- United States

== Partner nations ==
- Canada
- Germany
- South Korea
