= Shubham Mavi =

Indian cricketer (born 1997)

Personal information
- Full name: Shubham Chandrahas Mavi
- Born: 12 December 1997 (age 28); Bulandshahr, Uttar Pradesh, India
- Source: Cricinfo, 17 December 2019

Shubham Mavi (born 12 December 1997) is an Indian cricketer. He made his first-class debut on 17 December 2019, for Uttar Pradesh in the 2019–20 Ranji Trophy. Prior to his first-class debut, he was named in India's squad for the 2016 Under-19 Cricket World Cup.
