= James Muirhead (cricketer) =

Australian cricketer

Personal information
- Full name: James Matthew Muirhead
- Born: 30 July 1993 (age 33); Altona, Victoria, Australia
- Batting: Right-handed
- Bowling: Right-arm leg break
- Role: Bowler

International information
- National side: Australia (2014)
- T20I debut (cap 67): 29 January 2014 v England
- Last T20I: 30 March 2014 v India

Domestic team information
- Years: Team
- 2011/12: Adelaide Strikers
- 2012/13–2013/14: Victoria
- 2013/14: Melbourne Stars
- 2014/15–2017/18: Perth Scorchers

Career statistics
Competition	T20I	FC	LA	T20
Matches	5	3	4	15
Runs scored	4	26	17	15
Batting average	4.00	13.00	8.50	7.50
100s/50s	0/0	0/0	0/0	0/0
Top score	3	14*	11	6
Balls bowled	90	449	204	258
Wickets	6	8	7	17
Bowling average	18.16	43.50	34.28	19.05
5 wickets in innings	0	0	0	0
10 wickets in match	–	0	–	–
Best bowling	2/13	4/115	4/92	3/25
Catches/stumpings	3/–	0/–	1/–	8/–
- Source: ESPNcricinfo, 22 December 2022

James Matthew Muirhead (born 30 July 1993) is an Australian cricketer who has played for Victoria and the Perth Scorchers.

== Early career ==
Muirhead began his professional cricket career playing for the Adelaide Strikers in the inaugural edition of the Big Bash League (BBL) in the 2011/12 summer. He was given a rookie contract to play domestic cricket for his home state of Victoria the following year. During the 2012/13 season, the South Australian cricket team approached Muirhead to recruit him without Victoria's permission or knowledge, a breach of Australian cricket legislation that incurred a 15,000 AUD fine for South Australia.

== International career ==
Muirhead had an abrupt rise to Australia's national cricket team in the 2013/14 season. He began the season without any contract for the BBL (though he did get signed as an injury replacement to play for the Melbourne Stars midway through the season). He played several tour matches against the visiting English side during the 2013–14 Ashes series, including a 50-over Prime Minister's XI match in January 2014, where he had bowling figures of 3 for 52. Despite only having four career Twenty20 matches to his name (including only two for the Melbourne Stars that season), the Australian selectors were impressed by Muirhead's performances in the tour matches and selected him for Australia's Twenty20 International squad against England in January 2014. He performed well in the three-match series, taking two wickets in the third match.

Off the back of his international debut, Muirhead signed a four-year contract with Victoria, and he was selected to represent Australia at the 2014 World Twenty20 in Bangladesh. At this time, he had only played a combined total of 20 days of cricket across all formats at a professional level.

== Later career ==
After his return from the World Twenty20, Muirhead began to experience wrist pain. Over the course of 2014 the pain got worse, and he couldn't earn selection to play for Victoria. He underwent surgery in June 2015.
