= 2007 ICC Africa Under-19 Championship =

Under-19 cricket tournament

- Administrator: African Cricket Association
- Cricket format: 50-over
- Tournament format(s): Round-robin, then finals series
- Host: South Africa
- Champions: Namibia (2nd title)
- Participants: 8
- Matches: 16
- Most runs: (Namibia) Sean Silver (311)
- Most wickets: (Uganda) Charles Waiswa (14)

The 2007 ICC Africa Under-19 Championship was a cricket tournament held in South Africa from 25 to 30 August 2007. All matches were held at the Willowmoore Park complex in Benoni, Gauteng.

Namibia won the tournament by defeating Kenya in the final, qualifying for the 2008 Under-19 World Cup in Malaysia. Two African under-19 sides, South Africa and Zimbabwe, are ICC full members, and thus qualified directly for the World Cup. Namibian batsman Sean Silver and Uganda bowler Charles Waiswa led the tournament in runs and wickets, respectively.

The tournament was the second edition of the ICC Africa Under-19 Championships, after the inaugural championship in 2001. In 2003 and 2005, a joint World Cup qualification tournament was organised by ICC Africa and ICC East Asia-Pacific. The 2007 championships were the last at which there was only a single division – from the 2009 tournament onwards, there have been two divisions.

== Teams and qualification ==
All six African teams at the 2005 Africa/EAP Under-19 Championship qualified for the tournament, with the places of the two ICC East Asia-Pacific teams (Fiji and Papua New Guinea) taken by Botswana and Ghana:

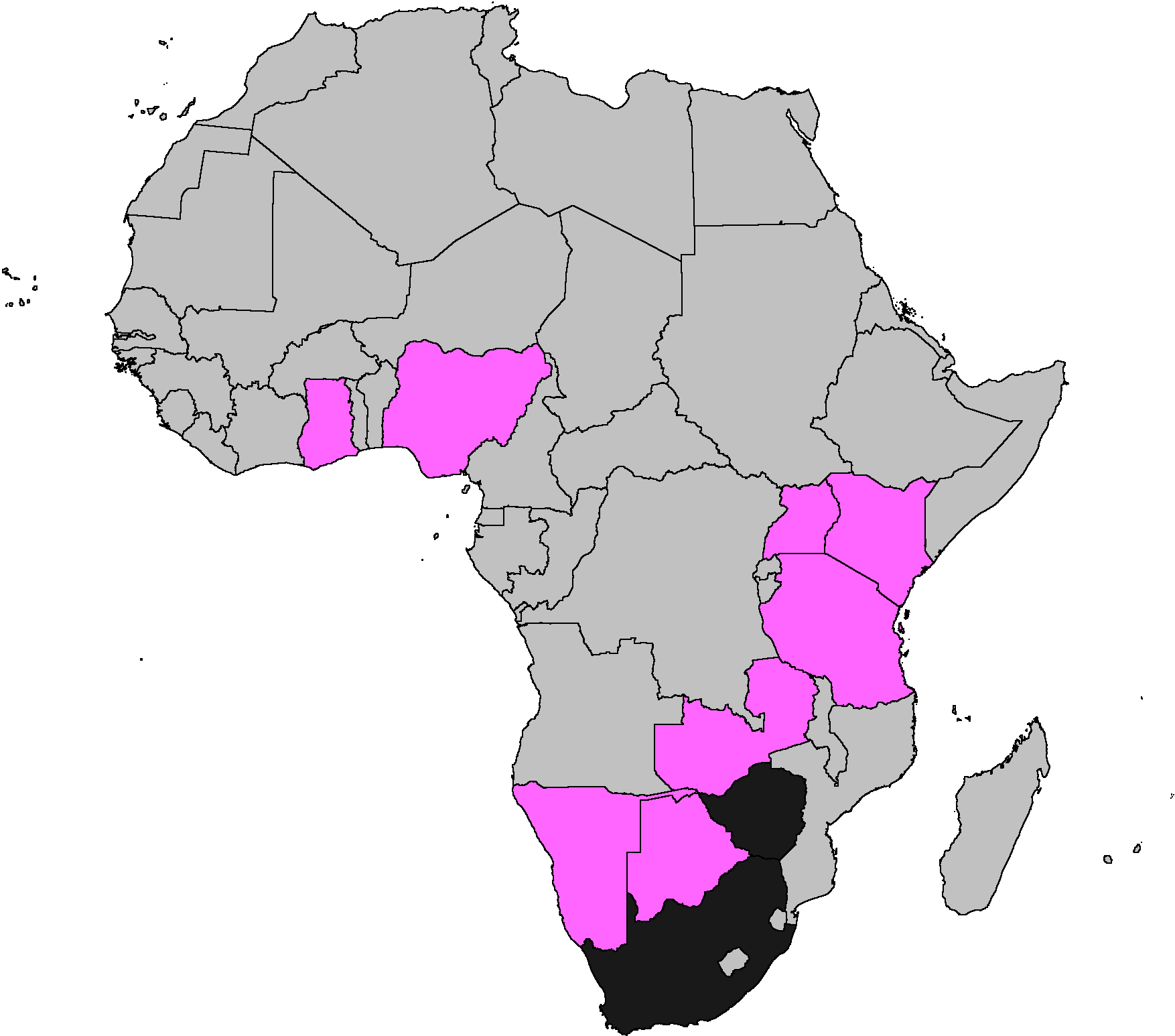
Teams at the 2008 ICC Africa Under-19 Championship Teams automatically qualified for the 2008 World Cup (ICC full members)

Team	Mode of qualification
Namibia	Champion of 2005 Africa/EAP Under-19 Championship
Uganda	Runner-up in 2005 Africa/EAP Under-19 Championship
Kenya	3rd place in 2005 Africa/EAP Under-19 Championship
Tanzania	5th place in 2005 Africa/EAP Under-19 Championship
Zambia	6th place in 2005 Africa/EAP Under-19 Championship
Nigeria	8th place in 2005 Africa/EAP Under-19 Championship
Botswana	Qualified
Ghana	Qualified

== Group stage ==
=== Pool A ===
Qualified for the semi-finals.

Team	Pld	W	L	T	NR	Pts	NRR
Kenya	3	3	0	0	0	6	+1.042
Namibia	3	2	1	0	0	4	+1.422
Zambia	3	1	2	0	0	2	–0.583
Ghana	3	0	3	0	0	0	–1.788

Source: CricketArchive

=== Pool B ===
Qualified for the semi-finals.

Team	Pld	W	L	T	NR	Pts	NRR
Uganda	3	2	1	0	0	6	+2.516
Botswana	3	2	1	0	0	4	+1.358
Tanzania	3	2	1	0	0	2	+1.223
Nigeria	3	0	3	0	0	0	–4.533

Source: CricketArchive

== Finals ==
=== 7th-place playoff ===
30 August
Scorecard

Nigeria; 168/8 (50 overs)	v	Tanzania; 169/3 (21.4 overs)
Jerry Omoregbe 42 (127); Omari Mandari 3/29 (10 overs); Hemedi Ally 3/29 (10 overs)		Seif Abdul 54* (45); Usman Bankole 2/30 (3 overs)

Tanzania under-19s won by 7 wickets.
Willowmoore Park (C Field), Benoni
Umpires: Godfrey Hlengani and Tshepo Molefe

- Nigeria won the toss and elected to bat.

=== 5th-place playoff ===
Two "semi-finals" for the fifth-place playoff were held, in which Ghana defeated Tanzania by seven wickets and Zambia defeated Nigeria by 315 runs. The two losing teams played each other in the seventh-place playoff.

30 May
Scorecard

Ghana; 205 (40.4 overs)	v	Zambia; 208/7 (46 overs)
James Vifah 47 (39); Tapson Nyirongo 3/23 (6.4 overs)		Sabir Haveliwala 50* (57); Peter Ananya 5/28 (10 overs)

Zambia Under-19s won by three wickets
Willowmoore Park (A Field), Benoni
Umpires: Olawale Adekoya and Juan Bedford

- Zambia won the toss and elected to bowl.

=== 3rd-place playoff ===
30 August
Scorecard

Botswana; 212/8 (50 overs)	v	Uganda; 214/5 (41.1 overs)
Karabo Modise 71* (65); Charles Waiswa 4/30 (10 overs)		Andrew Ochan 56 (70); Nadeem Tajbhay 1/23 (3 overs)

Uganda under-19s won by 5 wickets
Willowmoore Park (B Field), Benoni
Umpires: Kutub Gulamabbas (Ken) and Jeff Luck (Nam)

- Botswana won the toss and elected to bat.

=== Final ===
Two semi-finals were held, in which Kenya defeated Botswana by four wickets and Namibia defeated Uganda by nine wickets. The two losing teams played each other in the third-place playoff.

30 August
Scorecard

Namibia; 257/7 (50 overs)	v	Kenya; 218 (45.2 overs)
Sean Silver 73 (110); Prasanth Srinivas 3/55 (10 overs)		Samarth Patel 92 (119); Elandre Oosthuizen 5/35 (8.2 overs)

Namibia under-19s won by 39 runs.
Willowmoore Park (Main Oval), Benoni
Umpires: Jannie Bedford and Temba Msipha

- Namibia won the toss and elected to bat.
- Namibia won the Championship, and qualified for the 2008 Under-19 World Cup.

== Statistics ==
=== Most runs ===
The top five runscorers are included in this table, ranked by runs scored and then by batting average.

Player	Team	Runs	Inns	Avg	Highest	100s	50s
Sean Silver	Namibia	311	5	103.66	118*	2	1
Raymond van Schoor	Namibia	226	5	56.50	101*	1	1
Kafuma Banda	Zambia	197	5	39.40	109	1	0
Samarth Patel	Kenya	189	5	37.80	92	0	1
Sarfuddin Bangaliwala	Zambia	174	5	34.80	74	0	2

Source: CricketArchive

=== Most wickets ===
The top five wicket takers are listed in this table, ranked by wickets taken and then by bowling average.

Player	Team	Overs	Wkts	Ave	SR	Econ	BBI
Charles Waiswa	Uganda	48.4	14	8.21	20.85	2.36	6/3
Sabir Haveliwala	Zambia	48.5	12	11.50	24.41	2.82	3/14
Elandre Oosthuizen	Namibia	26.2	11	11.18	15.45	4.34	5/35
Karthik Rajeswaran	Botswana	40.1	10	12.70	24.10	3.16	5/16
Ashley van Rooi	Namibia	43.3	10	19.70	26.10	4.52	4/43

Source: CricketArchive
