= 2001 ICC Africa Under-19 Championship =

- Dates: 5 – 9 January 2001
- Administrator: African Cricket Association
- Cricket format: 50-over
- Tournament format: Round-robin
- Host: Uganda
- Champions: Namibia (1st title)
- Participants: 5
- Matches: 10
- Most runs: (Tanzania) Utpal Patel (171)
- Most wickets: (Kenya) Alfred Luseno (9) (Namibia) Michael Durant (9) (Nigeria) O. Animashaun (9)

The 2001 ICC Africa Under-19 Championship was a cricket tournament held in Uganda from January 5-9, 2001. All matches were played in the capital Kampala.

The tournament was a round-robin, with five teams playing each other once. Namibia finished first, ahead of a combined East and Central Africa side, and consequently qualified for the 2002 Under-19 World Cup in New Zealand. Tanzanian batsman Utpal Patel, playing for East and Central Africa, led the tournament in runs scored. Three players, Kenya's Alfred Luseno, Namibia's Michael Durant, and Nigeria's O. Animashaun (playing for West Africa), led the tournament in wickets taken, with nine apiece.

The tournament was the inaugural edition of the ICC Africa Under-19 Championships, which provide a direct qualification route to the Under-19 World Cup for African Cricket Association members. Two other African teams, South Africa and Zimbabwe, are full members of the International Cricket Council (ICC) and thus qualify automatically. Another edition of the tournament was not held until 2007. Instead, a joint tournament was organised with ICC East Asia-Pacific teams, held on two occasions (in 2003 and 2005).

== Teams and qualification ==
Two combined regional teams, East and Central Africa and West Africa, participated in the championship for the first and only time, respectively organised by the East and Central Africa Cricket Conference and the West Africa Cricket Council. Players from Malawi, Tanzania, and Zambia were eligible for East and Central Africa, while players from The Gambia, Ghana, Nigeria, and Sierra Leone were eligible for West Africa.

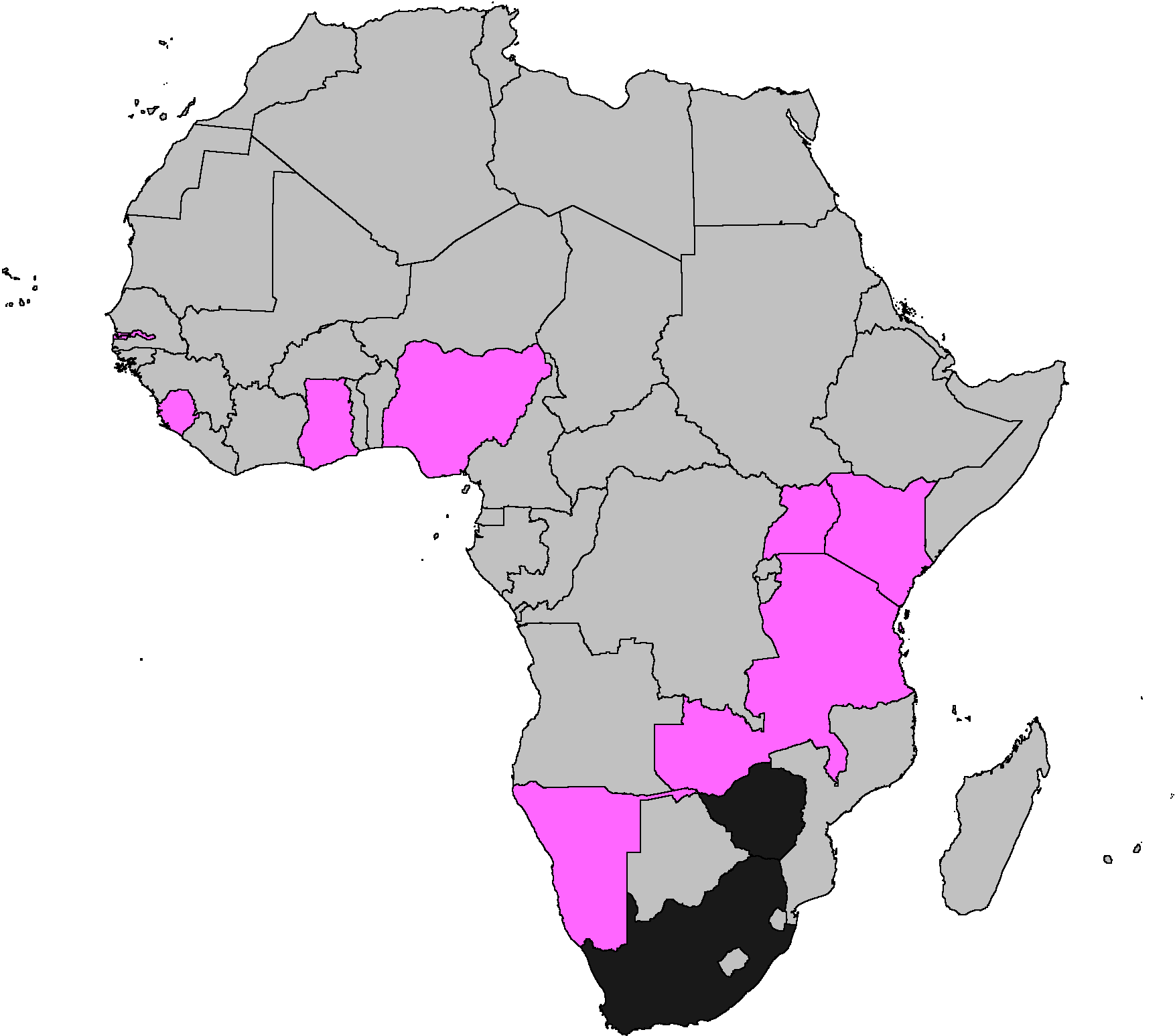
Teams at the 2001 ICC Africa Under-19 Championship Teams automatically qualified for the 2002 World Cup (ICC full members)

Team	Mode of qualification
East & Central Africa	Qualified
Kenya	Qualified
Namibia	Qualified
Uganda	Qualified
West Africa	Qualified

== Table ==
Qualified for the World Cup.

Team	Pld	W	L	T	NR	Pts	NRR
Namibia	4	3	1	0	0	6	+0.981
East and Central Africa	4	3	1	0	0	6	+0.287
Uganda	4	2	2	0	0	4	+1.236
Kenya	4	1	3	0	0	2	+0.295
West Africa	4	1	3	0	0	2	–2.543

Source: CricketArchive

== Statistics ==
=== Most runs ===
The top five run scorers are included in this table, ranked by runs scored and then by batting average.

Player	Team	Runs	Inns	Avg	Highest	100s	50s
Utpal Patel	(Tanzania) East and Central Africa	171	4	42.75	66	0	1
Stephan Swanepoel	Namibia	166	4	83.00	77*	0	2
Hugo Ludik	Namibia	159	4	53.00	52	0	1
Laurence Sematimba	Uganda	154	4	38.50	135	1	0
Rajesh Varsani	Kenya	129	4	32.25	96	0	1

Source: CricketArchive

=== Most wickets ===
The top five wicket takers are listed in this table, ranked by wickets taken and then by bowling average.

Player	Team	Overs	Wkts	Ave	SR	Econ	BBI
Alfred Luseno	Kenya	33.0	9	9.22	22.00	2.51	4/16
Michael Durant	Namibia	36.0	9	12.88	24.00	3.22	4/23
O. Animashaun	(Nigeria) West Africa	36.1	9	17.00	24.11	4.23	4/67
Chris Engola	Uganda	21.0	8	8.50	15.75	3.23	4/18
Dharmin Parmar	(Tanzania) East and Central Africa	38.2	8	10.37	28.75	2.16	4/18

Source: CricketArchive
