= 2003 ICC Africa/East Asia-Pacific Under-19 Championship =

- Administrator(s): ICC Africa and ICC East Asia-Pacific
- Cricket format: 50-over
- Tournament format(s): Round-robin, then finals series
- Host: Namibia
- Champions: Papua New Guinea (1st title)
- Participants: 8
- Matches: 20
- Most runs: (Kenya) Malhar Patel (250)
- Most wickets: (Papua New Guinea) William Harry (12) (Uganda) Patrick Ochan (12)

The 2003 ICC Africa/East Asia-Pacific Under-19 Championship was a cricket tournament held in Namibia from 4–9 October 2003, during the 2003–04 international season.

All matches were held in the capital Windhoek.

Papua New Guinea won the tournament by defeating Uganda in the final, with both teams qualifying for the 2004 Under-19 World Cup in Bangladesh. Kenyan batsman Malhar Patel led the competition in runs scored, while Papua New Guinea's William Harry and Uganda's Patrick Ochan took the most wickets.

The tournament was jointly organised by the African Cricket Association (ACA) and ICC East Asia-Pacific (EAP), the first time such an arrangement had occurred. Eight teams (six African and two EAP) participated, divided into two pools for the group stages. Another joint tournament was held in 2005, for the 2006 World Cup, but separate qualifying tournaments have been held since then – the ICC Africa Under-19 Championships and the EAP Under-19 Cricket Trophy.

== Teams and qualification ==
Both the African and the East Asia-Pacific regional governing bodies hosted qualifiers for the first time for the 2002 Under-19 World Cup in New Zealand. The 2001 Africa Under-19 Championship featured five teams, two of which (East and Central Africa and West Africa) were put up by regional bodies disbanded in 2003 (the East and Central Africa Cricket Conference and the West Africa Cricket Council). The 2001 EAP Under-19 Trophy featured three teams, one of which (Hong Kong) was a member of the Asian Cricket Council (ACC), and consequently not generally a participant in EAP tournaments.

Team	Region
Fiji	3rd place in 2001 East Asia-Pacific Under-19 Championship
Kenya	4th place in 2001 Africa Under-19 Championship
Namibia	Champion of 2001 Africa Under-19 Championship
Nigeria	5th place in 2001 Africa Under-19 Championship (as part of West Africa)
Papua New Guinea	Champion of 2001 East Asia-Pacific Under-19 Championship
Tanzania	Runner-up in 2001 Africa Under-19 Championship (as part of East and Central Africa)
Uganda	3rd place in 2001 Africa Under-19 Championship
Zambia	Runner-up in 2001 Africa Under-19 Championship (as part of East and Central Africa)

== Preparation ==
The championship was organized jointly by the African Cricket Association and ICC East Asia-Pacific, with the ICC confirming Windhoek, Namibia as host city and the tournament scheduled for 2–10 October 2003. The event brought together six African associate teams and two East Asia-Pacific associates to contest two World Cup qualification places to the 2004 Under-19 World Cup.

The tournament's logistics were concentrated solely in Windhoek, as all matches were to be played in the capital at established city grounds, including the Wanderers Cricket Ground. Teams arrived at Windhoek days before the start of the tournament to complete final preparations and practice sessions.

The ICC's regional development program played an active role in preparations for several participating teams. In Papua New Guinea, ICC development staff ran a national Under-19 training camp and organized the country's first Level-1 coach education course as part of broader preparations for the 2002-03 period, and the ICC Development Officer was directly engaged in selecting and preparing PNG's squad for this tournament.

National teams used pre-tournament training camps and selection trials to finalize squads and match strategies, as the tournament format and short window in early October required teams to travel with compact squads and rely on brief but intensive preparation blocks immediately prior to the event.

== Group stage ==
=== Pool A ===
Qualified for the semi-finals.

Team	Pld	W	L	T	NR	Pts	NRR
Papua New Guinea	3	3	0	0	0	6	+21.487
Uganda	3	2	1	0	0	4	–2.687
Zambia	3	1	2	0	0	2	–23.917
Nigeria	3	0	3	0	0	0	–7.538

=== Pool B ===
Qualified for the semi-finals.

Team	Pld	W	L	T	NR	Pts	NRR
Kenya	3	3	0	0	0	6	+7.575
Namibia	3	2	1	0	0	4	+0.797
Fiji	3	1	2	0	0	2	–4.174
Tanzania	3	0	3	0	0	0	–1.911

== Finals ==
=== 7th-place playoff ===
30 May
Scorecard

Fiji; 136 (38.1 overs)	v	Tanzania; 137/5 (39.1 overs)
Lepani Waqavesi 63; Khalil Rehmtullah 4/30 (7 overs)		Hamisi Abdallah 40; Jone Batiwibulu 3/28 (10 overs)

Tanzania under-19s won by five wickets.
Police Sports Club Ground, Windhoek

=== 5th-place playoff ===
Two semi-finals were held for the 5th-place playoff, with Nigeria defeating Fiji by 61 runs and Zambia defeating Tanzania by five wickets. The losing teams played each other in the 7th-place playoff.

9 October
Scorecard

Nigeria; 199/8	v	Zambia; 200/4
Augustine Areghan 44		Isaac Mwamba 84

Zambia won by six wickets
Windhoek

=== 3rd-place playoff ===
9 October
Scorecard

Namibia; 224/6	v	Kenya; 225/3
Dirk Grobler 64		Kalpesh Patel 86

Kenya under-19s won by seven wickets
Windhoek

=== Final ===
Two semi-finals were held, with Uganda defeating Kenya by four wickets and Papua New Guinea defeating Namibia by four wickets. The losing teams played each other in the 3rd-place playoff.

9 October
Scorecard

Papua New Guinea; 9/193	v	Uganda; 140 all out
Chris Amini 52; Patrick Ochan 3/39		Emmanuel Isaneez 56; William Harry 3/31

PNG under-19s won by 53 runs.
Windhoek

- Papua New Guinea won the Championship. Papua New Guinea and Uganda qualified for the 2004 Under-19 World Cup.

== Statistics ==
=== Most runs ===
The top five runscorers are included in this table, ranked by runs scored and then by batting average.

Player	Team	Runs	Inns	Avg	Highest	100s	50s
Malhar Patel	Kenya	250	4	62.50	87	0	3
Emmanuel Isaneez	Uganda	197	4	65.66	56	0	1
Hafeez Manji	Kenya	195	3	195.00	127	1	0
Mahuru Dai	PNG	193	2	n/a	142*	1	1
Isaac Mwamba	Zambia	191	4	47.75	84	0	1

Source: CricketArchive

=== Most wickets ===
The top five wicket takers are listed in this table, ranked by wickets taken and then by bowling average. Information for some games is unavailable, and some statistics are consequently incomplete for some players (marked *):

Player	Team	Overs	Wkts	Ave	SR	Econ	BBI
William Harry	PNG	*	12	4.66	*	*	5/11
Patrick Ochan	Uganda	*	12	9.91	*	*	3/19
Madaliso Mvula	Zambia	10.0	10	7.70	20.00	2.60	4/17
Rajesh Bhudia	Kenya	10.0	7	4.85	30.00	2.40	5/10
S. B. Takoviti	Fiji	20.0	7	9.14	17.14	3.20	6/25

Source: CricketArchive
