= Samarth Patel =

Kenyan cricketer (born 1988)

Personal information
- Full name: Samarth Chandrakant Patel
- Born: 17 December 1988 (age 37); Nairobi, Kenya
- Batting: Right-handed
- Bowling: Right-arm off-spin

International information
- National side: Kenya (2011)
- Source: CricketArchive, 2 February 2016

Samarth Chandrakant Patel (born 17 December 1988) is a Kenyan cricketer who made his debut for the Kenyan national side in 2011.

Patel was born in Nairobi to a family of Indian descent. He played for the Kenyan under-19s at the 2007 ICC Africa Under-19 Championship in South Africa, and opening the batting alongside Jeshani Naran scored 189 runs, the most for his team (and fourth overall). In the final against Namibia, he scored 92 runs from 119 balls, out of a team total of 218. Patel's debut for the Kenyan senior team came in July 2011, in a limited-overs game against the United Arab Emirates that was part of the World Cricket League Championship. He came in tenth in the batting order on debut, and scored only four runs. Patel made his first-class debut a few days later, in an Intercontinental Cup game against the same side. He scored 30 runs in the first innings and 14 in the second. In the 2011–12 East Africa Premier League, Patel played for the Nairobi Buffaloes.
