= ICC U19 Cricket World Cup Africa Qualifier =

- Administrator: International Cricket Council
- Format: 50-over
- First edition: 2001
- Latest edition: 2025
- Tournament format: Round-robin
- Current champion: Tanzania
- Most successful: Namibia (7 titles)

ICC U19 Cricket World Cup Africa Qualifier (formerly ICC Africa Under-19 Championships) are a series of regular cricket tournaments organised by the International Cricket Council (ICC) for under-19 teams from its African member nations. It is the regional qualifier for the ICC Under-19 World Cup.

The initial tournament was staged in 2001 but did not return until 2007. During the interim years a joint competition with the East Asia-Pacific Cricket Council was held. A second division was added in 2009 providing affiliate nations with a chance to participate. After this first edition, two teams were promoted, but since then only one team has moved between divisions. The two divisions are played at different times and in different locations.

The current champions are Tanzania, who won the 2025 tournament in Nigeria to qualify for the 2026 Under-19 Cricket World Cup. Namibia have won seven titles, the most of any team, while Uganda have won twice and Kenya, Nigeria and Tanzania once each.

== Under-19 World Cup Qualification History ==
One of the key aspects of the African Under-19 Championships is its role in Under-19 World Cup Qualification. Before the introduction of the championship only Kenya and Namibia took part in the World Cup. However, aided by the development of international cricket during the late 90s and 2000s the possibility of holding the first African regional qualifier arose in 2001. Of the five associate nations at that time, Kenya already had automatic qualification for the 2002 U-19 World Cup due to their ODI status. As a result, the highest finisher in the inaugural competition besides Kenya would also qualify. Namibia finished in first place and so earned themselves the final World Cup space.

For the following two U-19 World Cups, the African Cricket Association and the East Asia-Pacific Cricket Council organised joint qualification competitions from which two teams would progress. In the 2003 competition, Uganda qualified alongside EAP side Papua New Guinea for the 2004 U-19 World Cup but in 2005 two African nations, Namibia and Uganda made it through to the 2006 finals.

In 2007, the two councils once again organised separate competitions, meaning only one team would qualify from the African Championships. Namibia beat Kenya in the final to go through as the representative of African associate nations.

The entire qualification system for the U-19 World Cup was revamped in 2009. Whilst regionally, a second division of African affiliate nations was organised, including the chance of promotion, a new international qualification tournament was introduced by the ICC. This competition saw ten teams, two from each of the five cricketing regions, fighting for the six remaining places in the World Cup finals. The winners and runners-up of the 2009 Africa U-19 Championships, Uganda and Sierra Leone, made it through to the U-19 World Qualifiers, but neither finished high enough to progress to final. The Sierra Leone team hit the headlines when they were denied visas and so had no chance to compete.

The same system continued for the 2012 U-19 World Cup qualification, though the regional divisions were played a year earlier than usual, in 2010. Namibia and Kenya finished first and second in Division One earning them places in the U-19 World Cup Qualifier, held the next year.

== Tournament results ==
=== Division One ===
Year	Host(s)	Venue(s)	Final		
Year	Host(s)	Venue(s)	Winner	Result	Runner-up
2001	Uganda	Kampala	Namibia +0.981 NRR	Namibia won on net run rate table	East and Central Africa +0.287 NRR
2003 (with EAP)	Namibia	Windhoek	Papua New Guinea; 9/193 (50 overs)	Papua New Guinea won by 53 runs scorecard	Uganda; 140 all out
2005 (with EAP)	South Africa	Benoni	Namibia; 140/7 (43.3 overs)	Namibia won by 3 wickets scorecard	Uganda; 139 (47.3 overs)
2007	South Africa	Benoni	Namibia; 256/7 (50 overs)	Namibia won by 39 runs scorecard	Kenya; 217 all out (45.2 overs)
2009	Zambia	Lusaka	Uganda; 12 points	Uganda won on points table	Sierra Leone; 10 points
2010	Namibia	Windhoek	Namibia; 14 points	Namibia won on points table	Kenya; 10 points
2013	Uganda	Entebbe and Kampala	Namibia; 173 (47.2 overs)	Namibia won by 52 runs scorecard	Kenya; 121 (40 overs)
2015	Tanzania	Dar es Salaam	Namibia; 8 points	Namibia won on points fixtures	Uganda; 6 points
2017	Kenya	Nairobi	Kenya; 10 points	Kenya won on net run rate	Uganda; 10 points
2019	Namibia	Windhoek	Nigeria; 10 points	Nigeria won on points	Namibia; 8 points
2021	Rwanda	Kigali	Uganda; 6 points	Uganda won on net run rate table	Namibia; 6 points
2023	Tanzania	Dar es Salaam	Namibia; 9 points	Namibia won on points table	Kenya; 7 points
2025	Nigeria	Lagos	Tanzania; 10 points	Tanzania won on points table	Namibia; 8 points

=== Division Two ===
Year	Host(s)	Venue(s)	Final		
Year	Host(s)	Venue(s)	Winner	Result	Runner-up
2009	Mozambique	Maputo	Sierra Leone	Sierra Leone won on points	Ghana
2010	Eswatini	Big Bend	Nigeria; 8 points	Nigeria won on points table	Rwanda; 6 points
2013	South Africa	Benoni	Ghana	Ghana won on points	Tanzania
2014	Zambia	Lusaka	Tanzania; 10 points	Tanzania won on points table	Rwanda; 6 points
2016	South Africa	Benoni	Ghana; 12 points	Ghana won on points table	Botswana; 8 points
2018	South Africa	Potchefstroom	Nigeria; 242/9 (50 overs)	Nigeria won by 137 runs scorecard	Sierra Leone; 105 (31 overs)
2022	Nigeria	Abuja	Kenya; 90 (35 overs)	Kenya won by 11 runs	Nigeria; 79 (20.4 overs)
2024	Tanzania	Dar-es-Salaam	Tanzania; 178/8 (50 overs)	Tanzania won by 36 runs (DLS) scorecard	Sierra Leone; 98/8 (29 overs)

== Participating teams (Division One) ==
Legend

- 1st – Champions
- 2nd – Runners-up
- 3rd – Third place
- Q – Qualified
- * – Combined tournament with EAP members (not included in this table)
- – Hosts

Team	(Uganda) 2001	(Namibia) 2003*	(South Africa) 2005*	(South Africa) 2007	(Zambia) 2009	(Namibia) 2010	(Uganda) 2013	(Tanzania) 2015	(Kenya) 2017	(Namibia) 2019	(Rwanda) 2021	(Tanzania) 2023	(Nigeria) 2025	Total
Botswana	—	—	—	4th	6th	3rd	4th	6th	4th	―	―	―	―	6
Ghana	—	—	—	6th	—	—	—	—	3rd	―	―	―	―	2
Kenya	4th	3rd	3rd	2nd	5th	2nd	2nd	3rd	1st	5th	―	2nd	3rd	12
Namibia	1st	4th	1st	1st	3rd	1st	1st	1st	― (Note: Namibia had already qualified for the 2018 Under-19 Cricket World Cup and hence didn't need to play in the qualifiers.)	2nd	2nd	1st	2nd	12
Nigeria	—	6th	8th	8th	8th	7th	5th	5th	―	1st	5th	6th	5th	11
Rwanda	—	—	—	—	—	—	—	—	―	—	4th	―	―	1
Sierra Leone	—	—	—	—	2nd	6th	8th	—	―	4th	―	4th	6th	6
Tanzania	—	7th	5th	7th	7th	8th	7th	4th	―	6th	3rd	5th	1st	11
Uganda	3rd	2nd	2nd	3rd	1st	5th	3rd	2nd	2nd	3rd	1st	3rd	4th	13
Defunct teams
East and Central Africa	2nd	No longer an ICC member												1
West Africa	5th	No longer an ICC member												1
Zambia	—	5th	6th	5th	4th	4th	6th	—	―	―	N/A			6

== Records ==
This section includes performances by African teams and players at the 2003 and 2005 combined Africa/EAP tournaments.

Highest team scores

- 399/5 (50 overs) – Zambia vs Nigeria, 29 August 2007, at Willowmoore Park, Benoni.
- 356/9 (50 overs) – Kenya vs Fiji, 4 October 2003, at Police Sports Club, Windhoek.
- 355/8 (50 overs) – Uganda vs West Africa, 5 January 2001, at Lugogo Stadium, Kampala.
- 334/7 (50 overs) – Namibia vs Zambia, 27 May 2013, at Kyambogo Cricket Oval, Kampala.
- 321/6 (50 overs) – Namibia vs Botswana, 16 February 2015, at Annadil Burhani Ground, Dar es Salaam.

Lowest team scores

- 21 all out (18.4 overs) – Nigeria vs Uganda, 26 August 2007, at Willowmoore Park, Benoni.
- 35/8 (20 overs) – Sierra Leone vs Uganda, 4 May 2009, Centrals Sports Club, Lusaka.
- 36 all out (15 overs) – Tanzania vs Zambia, 5 September 2010, at Centre for Cricket Development, Windhoek.
- 41 all out (12.2 overs) – Nigeria vs Kenya, 28 May 2013, at Lugogo Stadium, Kampala.
- 42 all out (18.1 overs) – Nigeria vs Botswana, 25 August 2007, at Willowmoore Park, Benoni.

Highest individual scores

- 161 (143 balls) – (Namibia) Xander Pitchers, vs Zambia, 27 May 2013, at Kyambogo Cricket Oval, Kampala.
- 155* (129 balls) – (Namibia) Zane Green, vs Botswana, 16 February 2015, at Annadil Burhani Ground, Dar es Salaam.
- 152 (130 balls) – (Namibia) Gert Lotter, vs Sierra Leone, 31 August 2010, at Afrikaans Primary School, Windhoek.
- 135 (? balls) – (Uganda) Laurence Sematimba, vs West Africa, 5 January 2001, at Lugogo Stadium, Kampala.
- 127 (? balls) – (Kenya) Hafeez Manji, vs Fiji, 4 October 2003, at Police Sports Club, Windhoek.

Best bowling figures

- 7/11 (8 overs) – (Uganda) David Wabwire, vs Botswana, 14 February 2015, at Annadil Burhani Ground, Dar es Salaam.
- 7/12 (6.1 overs) – (Tanzania) Athumani Kakonzi, vs Fiji, 23 August 2005, at Willowmoore Park, Benoni.
- 7/14 (10 overs) – (Uganda) Collins Okwalinga, vs Tanzania, 19 February 2015, at Gymkhana Club Ground, Dar es Salaam.
- 6/3 (9.4 overs) – (Uganda) Charles Waiswa, vs Nigeria, 26 August 2007, at Willowmoore Park, Benoni.
- 6/7 (8 overs) – (Uganda) Geoffrey Nyero vs Sierra Leone, 4 May 2009, Centrals Sports Club, Lusaka.

== See also ==
- ICC Africa Twenty20 Championship
- ICC Africa Women's Championship
- World Cricket League Africa Region
