= 2005 ICC Africa/East Asia-Pacific Under-19 Championship =

- Administrator(s): ICC Africa and ICC East Asia-Pacific
- Cricket format: 50-over
- Tournament format(s): Round-robin, then finals series
- Host: South Africa
- Champions: Namibia (1st title)
- Participants: 8
- Matches: 20
- Most runs: (Tanzania) Benson Mwita (223)
- Most wickets: (Kenya) Rohit Vekaria (11)

The 2005 ICC Africa/East Asia-Pacific Under-19 Championship was a cricket tournament held in South Africa from 21 to 26 August 2005, during the 2005 international season. All matches were held at the Willowmoore Park complex in Benoni, Gauteng.

Namibia won the tournament by defeating Uganda in the final, with both teams qualifying for the 2006 Under-19 World Cup in Sri Lanka. Tanzanian batsman Benson Mwita led the competition in runs scored, while Kenya's Rohit Vekaria took the most wickets. Ugandan all-rounder Ronald Ssemanda was Player of the Final.

The tournament was jointly organised by the African Cricket Association (ACA) and ICC East Asia-Pacific (EAP), with eight teams (six African and two EAP) participating, divided into two pools for the group stages. Another joint tournament had been held in 2003, for the 2004 World Cup, but separate qualifying tournaments have been held since – the ICC Africa Under-19 Championships and the EAP Under-19 Cricket Trophy.

== Teams and qualification ==
Teams were unchanged from the 2003 tournament in Namibia:

Team	Region
Fiji	8th place in 2003 ICC Africa/EAP Under-19 Championship
Kenya	3rd place in 2003 ICC Africa/EAP Under-19 Championship
Namibia	4th place in 2003 ICC Africa/EAP Under-19 Championship
Nigeria	6th place in 2003 ICC Africa/EAP Under-19 Championship
Papua New Guinea	Champion of 2003 ICC Africa/EAP Under-19 Championship
Tanzania	7th place in 2003 ICC Africa/EAP Under-19 Championship
Uganda	Runner-up in 2003 ICC Africa/EAP Under-19 Championship
Zambia	5th place in 2003 ICC Africa/EAP Under-19 Championship

== Group stage ==
=== Pool A ===
Qualified for the semi-finals.

Team	Pld	W	L	T	NR	Pts	NRR
Papua New Guinea	3	3	0	0	0	6	+2.194
Kenya	3	2	1	0	0	4	+0.851
Zambia	3	1	2	0	0	2	+0.020
Nigeria	3	0	3	0	0	0	–3.155

=== Pool B ===
Qualified for the semi-finals.

Team	Pld	W	L	T	NR	Pts	NRR
Uganda	3	3	0	0	0	6	+1.192
Namibia	3	2	1	0	0	4	+1.016
Tanzania	3	1	2	0	0	2	+0.573
Fiji	3	0	3	0	0	0	–2.570

== Finals ==
=== 7th-place playoff ===
26 August
Scorecard

Nigeria; 46 (19.5 overs)	v	Fiji; 47/2 (10.4 overs)
A. Lekan 11 (43); J. Waisale 4/16 (6.5 overs)		Josefa Rika 15* (14); O. Ajao 1/13 (2 overs)

Fiji under-19s won by eight wickets
Willowmoore Park (C Field), Benoni
Umpires: Clive Elly (PNG) and Jeff Luck (Nam)
Player of the match: J. Waisale (Fiji)

- Nigeria won the toss and elected to bat.

=== 5th-place playoff ===
Two semi-finals were held for the 5th-place playoff, with Zambia defeating Fiji by four wickets and Tanzania defeating Nigeria by eight wickets. The losing teams played each other in the 7th-place playoff.

26 August
Scorecard

Zambia; 136 (44 overs)	v	Tanzania; 137/5 (47.3 overs)
Sarfraz Patel 40 (43); Benson Mwita 3/22 (10 overs)		Shaheed Dhanani 50 (108); Godfrey Kandela 2/25 (10 overs)

Tanzania under-19s won by five wickets
Willowmoore Park (A Field), Benoni
Umpires: R. Girish and Subhash Modi (Ken)
Player of the match: Shaheed Dhanani (Tan)

- Tanzania won the toss and elected to bowl.

=== 3rd-place playoff ===
26 August
Scorecard

Kenya; 232 (50 overs)	v	Papua New Guinea; 228 (49 overs)
Hafeez Manji 97 (116); Jack Ebani 4/27 (10 overs)		Emmanuel Karo 69 (102); Nelson Odhiambo 3/43 (8 overs)

Kenya under-19s won by four runs
Willowmoore Park (B Field), Benoni
Umpires: Rafiq Valimahomed (Malawi) and D. Mohammed

- Papua New Guinea won the toss and elected to bowl.

=== Final ===
Two semi-finals were held, with Uganda defeating Kenya by two wickets and Namibia defeating Papua New Guinea by 100 runs. The losing teams played each other in the 3rd-place playoff.

26 August
Scorecard

Uganda; 139 (47.3 overs)	v	Namibia; 140/7 (43.3 overs)
Ronald Ssemanda 29; Henno Prinsloo 3/16 (8.3 overs)		Stephanus Ackermann 38 (78); Emmanuel Isaneez 2/25 (9 overs)

Namibia under-19s won by three wickets
Willowmoore Park (Main Oval), Benoni
Umpires: David Odhiambo (Ken) and (Indonesia) Shahul Hameed (Indon)
Player of the match: Ronald Ssemanda (Uga)

- Uganda won the toss and elected to bat.
- Namibia won the Championship. Namibia and Uganda qualified for the 2006 Under-19 World Cup.

== Statistics ==
=== Most runs ===
The top five runscorers are included in this table, ranked by runs scored and then by batting average.

Player	Team	Runs	Inns	Avg	Highest	100s	50s
Benson Mwita	Tanzania	223	5	55.75	124	1	1
Dawid Botha	Namibia	186	5	37.20	66	0	1
Louis van der Westhuizen	Namibia	184	5	36.80	113	1	0
Hafeez Manji	Kenya	179	5	44.75	97	0	2
Abhik Patwa	Tanzania	162	5	32.40	73	0	2

Source: CricketArchive

=== Most wickets ===
The top five wicket takers are listed in this table, ranked by wickets taken and then by bowling average.

Player	Team	Overs	Wkts	Ave	SR	Econ	BBI
Rohit Vekaria	Kenya	42.0	11	11.90	22.90	3.11	4/26
Godfrey Kandela	Zambia	43.2	10	9.40	26.00	2.16	4/23
Henno Prinsloo	Namibia	46.3	10	10.50	27.90	2.25	3/16
Sarfraz Patel	Zambia	46.3	10	10.50	27.90	2.25	4/12
Davis Arinaitwe	Uganda	35.1	10	11.30	21.10	3.21	3/29

Source: CricketArchive
