= 2000 Under-19 Cricket World Cup =

Cricket tournament

2000 ICC Under-19 Cricket World Cup
- Dates: 11 – 28 January 2000
- Administrator: ICC
- Cricket format: Limited-overs (50 overs)
- Host: Sri Lanka
- Champions: India (1st title)
- Runners-up: Sri Lanka
- Participants: 16
- Matches: 54
- Player of the series: (India) Yuvraj Singh
- Most runs: (South Africa) Graeme Smith (348)
- Most wickets: (Pakistan) Zahid Saeed (15)

The 2000 ICC Under-19 Cricket World Cup was an international limited-overs cricket tournament played in Sri Lanka from 11 to 28 January 2000. It was the third edition of the Under-19 Cricket World Cup and the first to be held in Sri Lanka.

The 2000 World Cup was contested by sixteen teams, including three making their tournament debuts. After an initial group stage, the top eight teams played off in a super league to decide the tournament champions, with the non-qualifiers playing a separate "plate" competition. Portions of the group stage were heavily impacted by rain, especially in Group C, where only two matches could be played to completion. In the final, played at Colombo's Sinhalese Sports Club, India defeated Sri Lanka by six wickets. Both teams had made the final for the first time. Indian all-rounder Yuvraj Singh was named player of the tournament, while South Africa's Graeme Smith was the leading run-scorer and Pakistan's Zahid Saeed was the leading wicket-taker.

== Teams and qualification ==
The nine full members of the International Cricket Council (ICC) qualified automatically for the World Cup, while another seven teams qualified via other paths. Bangladesh and Nepal qualified as the top two teams at the 1999 Youth Asia Cup, while Ireland and the Netherlands did likewise through the 1999 European Under-19 Championship. The ICC Africa Under-19 Championships were not established until 2001, but Kenya and Namibia were invited to the World Cup as the top ICC associate members in Africa. There was also no qualification tournament held in the Americas development region, with instead a combined regional team being fielded (for the first and only time).

- Americas
- Australia
- Bangladesh
- England
- India
- Ireland
- Kenya
- Namibia
- Netherlands
- Nepal
- New Zealand
- Pakistan
- South Africa
- Sri Lanka
- West Indies
- Zimbabwe

== Group stage ==
=== Group A ===
Team	Pld	W	L	T	NR	Pts	NRR
West Indies	3	3	0	0	0	6	+2.779
England	3	2	1	0	0	4	+0.073
Zimbabwe	3	1	2	0	0	2	–0.236
Americas	3	0	3	0	0	0	–2.725
Source: CricketArchive

11 January
Scorecard

Americas; 105 (33.1 overs)	v	England; 109/2 (19.1 overs)

England won by 8 wickets
Moors Sports Club, Colombo

11 January
Scorecard

West Indies; 234/6 (50 overs)	v	Zimbabwe; 92/9 (31 overs)

West Indies won by 124 runs (D/L)
Nondescripts Cricket Club, Colombo

- Jermaine Lawson (West Indies Under-19s) took a hat-trick.

13 January
Scorecard

Americas; 95 (42.1 overs)	v	Zimbabwe; 96/2 (23.2 overs)

Zimbabwe won by 8 wickets
Kadirana Cricket Ground, Colombo

13 January
Scorecard

West Indies; 196 (48.3 overs)	v	England; 98 (36 overs)

West Indies won by 98 runs
Sinhalese Sports Club, Colombo

15 January
Scorecard

West Indies; 216/6 (50 overs)	v	Americas; 74 (40.1 overs)

West Indies won by 142 runs
Kadirana Cricket Ground, Colombo

15 January
Scorecard

England; 187/8 (50 overs)	v	Zimbabwe; 184/6 (50 overs)

England won by 3 runs
Colombo Cricket Club, Colombo

=== Group B ===
Team	Pld	W	L	NR	A	Pts	NRR
India	3	2	0	1	0	5	+1.500
New Zealand	3	1	1	0	1	3	+1.500
Bangladesh	3	1	1	0	1	3	–1.073
Netherlands	3	0	2	1	0	1	–3.339
Source: CricketArchive

12 January

India; 235/5 (50 overs)	v	Bangladesh; 113 (34.5 overs)

India won by 122 runs
Tyronne Fernando Stadium, Moratuwa

12 January
Scorecard

New Zealand; 206/6 (32 overs)	v	Netherlands; 55/9 (32 overs)

New Zealand won by 151 runs
Uyanwatta Stadium, Matara

14 January
Scorecard

Bangladesh	v	New Zealand

Match abandoned
Galle International Stadium, Galle

14 January

Netherlands; 58 (29.2 overs)	v	India; 15/3 (4 overs)

No result
Uyanwatta Stadium, Matara

16 January
Scorecard

Netherlands; 137 (46.5 overs)	v	Bangladesh; 119/5 (25.3 overs)

Bangladesh won by 41 runs (D/L)
Tyronne Fernando Stadium, Moratuwa

16 January
Scorecard

India; 199 (49.1 overs)	v	New Zealand; 171 (49.3 overs)

India won by 28 runs
Galle International Stadium, Galle

=== Group C ===
Team	Pld	W	L	NR	A	Pts	NRR
Pakistan	3	1	0	0	2	4	+2.912
Nepal	3	1	0	1	1	4	+0.304
South Africa	3	0	0	1	2	3	n/a
Kenya	3	0	2	0	1	1	–1.158
Source: CricketArchive

12 January
Scorecard

Kenya; 66 (25 overs)	v	Pakistan; 67/2 (15.5 overs)

Pakistan won by 8 wickets
Radella Cricket Grounds, Nuwara Eliya

12 January
Scorecard

South Africa; 295/5 (50 overs)	v	Nepal; 24/4 (12 overs)

No result
Air Force Sports Club, Katunayake

14 January
Scorecard

Kenya	v	South Africa

Match abandoned
Welagedara Stadium, Kurunegala

14 January
Scorecard

Nepal	v	Pakistan

Match abandoned
Asgiriya Stadium, Kandy

16 January
Scorecard

Nepal; 107 (44.3 overs)	v	Kenya; 93 (24.5 overs)

Nepal won by 14 runs
Asgiriya Stadium, Kandy

16 January
Scorecard

Pakistan	v	South Africa

Match abandoned
Welagedara Stadium, Kurunegala

=== Group D ===
Team	Pld	W	L	T	NR	Pts	NRR
Sri Lanka	3	3	0	0	0	6	+2.238
Australia	3	2	1	0	0	4	+2.041
Ireland	3	0	2	1	0	1	–1.371
Namibia	3	0	2	1	0	1	–3.017
Source: CricketArchive

12 January
Scorecard

Australia; 321/2 (50 overs)	v	Namibia; 55 (30.4 overs)

Australia won by 266 runs
P. Saravanamuttu Stadium, Colombo

12 January
Scorecard

Ireland; 134 (47.1 overs)	v	Sri Lanka; 135/2 (23.2 overs)

Sri Lanka won by 8 wickets
Sinhalese Sports Club, Colombo

14 January
Scorecard

Australia; 240 (49.4 overs)	v	Ireland; 177/9 (50 overs)

Australia won by 63 runs
Colombo Cricket Club, Colombo

14 January
Scorecard

Namibia; 93 (44.2 overs)	v	Sri Lanka; 96/3 (20.4 overs)

Sri Lanka won by 7 wickets
P. Saravanamuttu Stadium, Colombo

16 January
Scorecard

Namibia; 186/7 (48 overs)	v	Ireland; 127/5 (36 overs)

Match tied (D/L)
Moors Sports Club, Colombo

16 January
Scorecard

Australia; 90 (37.1 overs)	v	Sri Lanka; 91/2 (27 overs)

Sri Lanka won by 8 wickets
R. Premadasa Stadium, Colombo

== Plate competition ==
The plate competition was contested by the eight teams that failed to qualify for the Super League.

=== Group 1 ===
Team	Pld	W	L	T	NR	Pts	NRR
Bangladesh	3	3	0	0	0	6	+2.565
Zimbabwe	3	2	1	0	0	4	+0.142
Kenya	3	1	2	0	0	2	–0.984
Namibia	3	0	3	0	0	0	–1.640
Source: CricketArchive

19 January
Scorecard

Namibia; 57 (28.3 overs)	v	Bangladesh; 58/3 (11.1 overs)

Bangladesh won by 7 wickets
Uyanwatta Stadium, Matara

19 January
Scorecard

Kenya; 162 (44.2 overs)	v	Zimbabwe; 165/4 (31.4 overs)

Zimbabwe won by 6 wickets
Galle International Stadium, Galle

21 January
Scorecard

Bangladesh; 198 (50 overs)	v	Kenya; 73 (37.3 overs)

Bangladesh won by 125 runs
Uyanwatta Stadium, Matara

21 January
Scorecard

Namibia; 231/5 (50 overs)	v	Zimbabwe; 233/7 (48.2 overs)

Zimbabwe won by 3 wickets
Galle International Stadium, Galle

23 January
Scorecard

Bangladesh; 270/7 (50 overs)	v	Zimbabwe; 195/9 (50 overs)

Bangladesh won by 75 runs
Nondescripts Cricket Club, Colombo

23 January
Scorecard

Kenya; 220 (48 overs)	v	Namibia; 166 (44.2 overs)

Kenya won by 54 runs
Air Force Sports Club, Katunayake

=== Group 2 ===
Team	Pld	W	L	T	NR	Pts	NRR
South Africa	3	3	0	0	0	6	+3.376
Ireland	3	2	1	0	0	4	–0.062
Netherlands	3	1	2	0	0	2	–1.161
Americas	3	0	3	0	0	0	–1.620
Source: CricketArchive

19 January
Scorecard

South Africa; 264/3 (50 overs)	v	Americas; 113 (40 overs)

South Africa won by 151 runs
Welagedara Stadium, Kurunegala

19 January
Scorecard

Ireland; 149/8 (40 overs)	v	Netherlands; 130 (38.3 overs)

Ireland won by 19 runs
Radella Cricket Grounds, Nuwara Eliya

21 January
Scorecard

Ireland; 183 (48.5 overs)	v	Americas; 98 (36.3 overs)

Ireland won by 85 runs
Radella Cricket Grounds, Nuwara Eliya

21 January
Scorecard

South Africa; 278/6 (50 overs)	v	Netherlands; 124/8 (49 overs)

South Africa won by 154 runs
Asgiriya Stadium, Kandy

23 January
Scorecard

Netherlands; 226/7 (50 overs)	v	Americas; 219/8 (50 overs)

Netherlands won by 7 runs
Radella Cricket Grounds, Nuwara Eliya

23 January
Scorecard

Ireland; 78 (30 overs)	v	South Africa; 82/0 (13.4 overs)

South Africa won by 10 wickets
Welagedara Stadium, Kurunegala

Plate Semi-finals
25 January – (Sri Lanka) Welagedara Stadium
Bangladesh	196
Ireland	129
25 January – (Sri Lanka) Asgiriya Stadium
Zimbabwe	179/7
South Africa	180/2

Plate Final
27 January – (Sri Lanka) Asgiriya Stadium
South Africa	213
Bangladesh	133

=== Plate Semi-finals ===
25 January
Scorecard

Bangladesh; 196 (48.5 overs)	v	Ireland; 129 (43.3 overs)
Mohammad Kalim 58 (85); Dwayne McGerrigle 4/54 (9.5 overs)		Niall O'Brien 36 (93); Ranjan Das 4/19 (9 overs)

Bangladesh won by 67 runs
Welagedara Stadium, Kurunegala

- Bangladesh won the toss and elected to bat.

25 January
Scorecard

Zimbabwe; 179/7 (50 overs)	v	South Africa; 180/2 (35.2 overs)
Greg Lamb 63 (87); Dewald Senekal 2/18 (9 overs)		Graeme Smith 82* (101); Hilton Henderson 2/48 (10 overs)

South Africa won by 8 wickets
Asgiriya Stadium, Kandy

- Zimbabwe won the toss and elected to bat.

=== Plate Final ===
27 January
Scorecard

South Africa; 213 (49.4 overs)	v	Bangladesh; 133 (47.5 overs)
Graeme Smith 51 (62); Ranjan Das 3/43 (10 overs)		Hannan Sarkar 51 (90); Dewald Senekal 3/20 (10 overs)

South Africa won by 80 runs
Asgiriya Stadium, Kandy

- South Africa won the toss and elected to bat.

== Super League ==
=== Group 1 ===
Team	Pld	W	L	T	NR	Pts	NRR
Pakistan	3	3	0	0	0	6	+0.879
Australia	3	2	1	0	0	4	+0.307
West Indies	3	1	2	0	0	2	+0.134
New Zealand	3	0	3	0	0	0	–1.270
Source: CricketArchive

18 January
Scorecard

West Indies; 199/6 (50 overs)	v	Australia; 202/6 (48.5 overs)

Australia won by 4 wickets
Sinhalese Sports Club, Colombo

18 January
Scorecard

New Zealand; 90 (42.3 overs)	v	Pakistan; 94/4 (31.4 overs)

Pakistan won by 6 wickets
R. Premadasa Stadium, Colombo

20 January
Scorecard

Australia; 112 (47.5 overs)	v	Pakistan; 113/6 (39.1 overs)

Pakistan won by 4 wickets
R. Premadasa Stadium, Colombo

20 January
Scorecard

West Indies; 218/8 (50 overs)	v	New Zealand; 161 (43.1 overs)

West Indies won by 57 runs
Nondescripts Cricket Club, Colombo

22 January
Scorecard

Australia; 122 (42.2 overs)	v	New Zealand; 53 (27 overs)

Australia won by 69 runs
Tyronne Fernando Stadium, Moratuwa

22 January
Scorecard

West Indies; 182 (49.4 overs)	v	Pakistan; 185/7 (43.1 overs)

Pakistan won by 3 wickets
Colombo Cricket Club, Colombo

=== Group 2 ===
Team	Pld	W	L	T	NR	Pts	NRR
India	3	3	0	0	0	6	+1.137
Sri Lanka	3	2	1	0	0	4	+1.441
England	3	1	2	0	0	2	–0.520
Nepal	3	0	3	0	0	0	–2.190
Source: CricketArchive

18 January
Scorecard

Nepal; 101/9 (44 overs)	v	India; 105/2 (25.2 overs)

India won by 8 wickets
Police Park Ground, Colombo

18 January
Scorecard

England; 123 (47.3 overs)	v	Sri Lanka; 124/3 (24.5 overs)

Sri Lanka won by 7 wickets
P. Saravanamuttu Stadium, Colombo

20 January
Scorecard

England; 182/9 (50 overs)	v	India; 183/1 (42.3 overs)

India won by 9 wickets
Colombo Cricket Club, Colombo

20 January
Scorecard

Nepal; 89 (34.2 overs)	v	Sri Lanka; 92/1 (18.3 overs)

Sri Lanka won by 9 wickets
Tyronne Fernando Stadium, Moratuwa

22 January
Scorecard

England; 260/7 (50 overs)	v	Nepal; 196 (46.3 overs)

England won by 64 runs
Moors Sports Club, Colombo

22 January
Scorecard

India; 242/7 (50 overs)	v	Sri Lanka; 201 (45.4 overs)

India won by 41 runs
R. Premadasa Stadium, Colombo

=== Semi-finals ===
24 January
Scorecard

Sri Lanka; 219 (49.1 overs)	v	Pakistan; 209 (50 overs)
Ian Daniel 58 (93); Irfan Fazil 2/28 (6 overs)		Faisal Iqbal 53 (71); Akalanka Ganegama 2/24 (10 overs)

Sri Lanka won by 10 runs
Galle International Stadium, Galle

- Sri Lanka won the toss and elected to bat.

25 January
Scorecard

India; 284/6 (50 overs)	v	Australia; 114 (34.5 overs)
Ravneet Ricky 108 (148); Liam Buchanan 2/36 (6 overs)		Shane Watson 38 (63); Anup Dave 3/25 (8 overs)

India won by 170 runs
P. Saravanamuttu Stadium, Colombo

- India won the toss and elected to bat.

=== Final ===
28 January
Scorecard

Sri Lanka; 178 (48.1 overs)	v	India; 180/4 (40.4 overs)
Jehan Mubarak 58 (108); Shalabh Srivastava 3/33 (9 overs)		Reetinder Sodhi 39* (43); Kaushal Lokuarachchi 1/20 (6 overs)

India won by 6 wickets
Sinhalese Sports Club, Colombo
Umpires: Asoka de Silva (SL) and Peter Manuel (SL)
Player of the match: Reetinder Sodhi (Ind)

- Sri Lanka won the toss and elected to bat.

== Future senior players ==
Future players that featured for their national team in the tournament were:

Team	Future senior cricketers
Australia	Michael Clarke; Ed Cowan; Nathan Hauritz; Mitchell Johnson; Shaun Marsh; Andrew McDonald; Shane Watson
Bangladesh	Hannan Sarkar; Anwar Hossain Monir; Mohammad Ashraful; Mohammad Salim; Rajin Saleh; Ranjan Das
England	Alex Loudon; Ian Bell; Michael Carberry; Tim Murtagh
India	Mohammad Kaif; Venugopal Rao; Ajay Ratra; Yuvraj Singh; Reetinder Sodhi
Ireland	Ryan Haire; Andrew White; John Mooney; Dom Joyce; Niall O'Brien
Kenya	Mohammad Sheikh; Josephat Ababu; Collins Obuya; Morris Ouma; Kalpesh Patel
Namibia	Jan-Berrie Burger; Stephan Swanepoel; Burton van Rooi
Netherlands	Atse Buurman; Adeel Raja; Daan van Bunge
New Zealand	James Franklin; Ian Butler; Jamie How; Brendon McCullum; Nathan McCullum; Shanan Stewart
Pakistan	Hasan Raza; Danish Kaneria; Faisal Iqbal; Humayun Farhat; Irfan Fazil; Imran Farhat; Imran Nazir; Mohammad Sami; Shoaib Malik; Taufeeq Umar; Yasir Arafat
South Africa	Thami Tsolekile; Johan Botha; Albie Morkel; Andrew Puttick; Jacques Rudolph; Graeme Smith; Jonathan Trott
Sri Lanka	Akalanka Ganegama; Thilina Kandamby; Kaushal Lokuarachchi; Jehan Mubarak; Prabath Nissanka; Muthumudalige Pushpakumara; Kaushalya Weeraratne
United States	Ashish Bagai; Chris Foggo; Ashif Mulla; Steven Outerbridge; Oliver Pitcher; Kevin Sandher; Zubin Surkari
West Indies	Ryan Hinds; Sewnarine Chattergoon; Narsingh Deonarine; Jermaine Lawson; Brenton Parchment; Marlon Samuels
Zimbabwe	Mluleki Nkala; Sean Ervine; Gavin Ewing; Travis Friend; Greg Lamb; Alester Maregwede; Hamilton Masakadza; Tatenda Taibu
