= Michael Durant (disambiguation) =

Michael Durant is an American retired Army pilot and 2022 U.S. Senate candidate in Alabama.

Michael Durant may also refer to:

- Michael Durant (cricketer), South African-born Namibian cricketer
- Mike Durant (baseball), retired Major League Baseball catcher
