= Ronald Ssemanda =

Ugandan cricketer (born 1988)

Personal information
- Born: 15 December 1988 (age 37); Uganda
- Batting: Right-handed
- Bowling: Right-arm medium
- Role: All-rounder

Domestic team information
- Years: Team
- 2007–2012: Uganda

Career statistics
Competition	FC	LA	T20
Matches	2	18	11
Runs scored	69	227	88
Batting average	34.50	18.91	12.57
100s/50s	0/0	0/1	0/0
Top score	41	72	23
Balls bowled	198	694	108
Wickets	2	13	5
Bowling average	49.50	34.23	30.20
5 wickets in innings	0	0	0
10 wickets in match	0	0	0
Best bowling	2/66	3/29	2/18
Catches/stumpings	2/–	5/–	5/–
- Source: CricketArchive, 9 February 2015

Ronald Ssemanda (born 15 December 1988) is a Ugandan cricketer who made his competitive debut for the Ugandan national side at the 2007 WCL Division Three tournament. His most recent matches for Uganda came at the 2013 WCL Africa T20 Division One tournament.

A right-handed all-rounder, Ssemanda played for the Ugandan under-19 sides in two Under-19 World Cups, where matches had under-19 One Day International (ODI) status. At the 2004 event in Bangladesh, aged 15, he played in four matches, with a best of 2/29 against Nepal, while at the 2006 event in Sri Lanka, he played in five matches, with a best of 4/43 against Bangladesh. Ssemanda had earlier been Player of the Final at the 2005 Africa/EAP Under-19 Championship, in which Uganda defeated Namibia to qualify for the World Cup.

Ssemanda made his senior debut for Uganda aged 19, at the 2007 WCL Division Three tournament. Uganda won that tournament to gain promotion to 2007 Division Two, where matches held list-A status. In the opening match of the tournament against the United Arab Emirates, Ssemanda scored 72 runs from 115 balls, his only list-A half-century. He later took 3/29 against Argentina, his best bowling figures. Ssemanda has since also represented Uganda in two first-class matches (in the 2009–10 Intercontinental Shield) and multiple twenty20 matches. In the East Africa Cup and East Africa Premier League, he played for the Rwenzori Warriors in both the 2011–12 and 2012 editions.
