= Ivan Thawithemwira =

Ugandan international cricketer (born 1982)

Personal information
- Born: 10 May 1982 (age 44); Kampala, Uganda
- Batting: Right-handed
- Bowling: Right-arm medium
- Role: Middle-order batsman

International information
- National side: Uganda (2009–2015)
- Source: CricketArchive, 5 April 2016 2016

Ivan Thawithemwira (born 10 May 1982) is a Ugandan international cricketer who made his debut for the Ugandan national side in 2009. He plays as a right-handed middle-order batsman.

Thawithemwira was born in Kampala. He represented the Ugandan under-19s at the 2001 Africa Under-19 Championship, and played for Uganda A in February 2008, but made his senior debut for Uganda in December 2009, on a tour of Kenya. In January 2010, Thawithemwira represented Uganda in the Kenya Tri-Series, where matches held full Twenty20 status. He made 17 runs in the first match against Kenya, but in two matches against Scotland had little success, making a golden duck in the first and one run in the second. Thawithemwira next appeared for Uganda at the 2011 Africa Twenty20 Division One tournament. After that, he did not return to the national line-up for almost four years, until he was recalled for the 2015 Africa Twenty20 Division One event.

At the 2015 ICC Development Programme Annual Awards, Thawithemwira was named Volunteer of the Year, for his work promoting cricket in the town of Fort Portal and the wider Western Region.

As of 2021, he was the coach of the Uganda national under-19 cricket team.
