= Hafeez Manji =

Personal information
- Born: 3 December 1987 (age 38); Nairobi, Kenya
- Batting: Right-handed
- Bowling: Right-arm medium-fast
- Role: Batsman, occasional wicket-keeper

Domestic team information
- Years: Team
- 2003: Kenya

Career statistics
Competition	LA
Matches	1
Runs scored	3
Batting average	n/a
100s/50s	0/0
Top score	3*
Catches/stumpings	0/–
- Source: CricketArchive, 9 February 2015

Hafeez Manji (born 3 December 1987) is a former Kenyan cricketer whose single list-A appearance for the Kenyan national side came in October 2003, when he was aged 15.

Born in Nairobi, Manji represented Kenya in the 2002 East Africa Under-17 Championship. He went to make his debut for the Kenya under-19s in October 2003, at the 2003 Africa/EAP Under-19 Championship in Namibia. Against Fiji in the opening match of the tournament, he scored a century, 127 runs, with half-centuries from Malhar Patel (76) and Ashish Karia (57) helping Kenya to a total of 356/9 from its 50 overs, and an eventual 320-run victory as Rajesh Bhudia (5/10) and Hiren Varaiya (3/6) bowled Fiji out for 36. With subsequent innings of 44 not out against Namibia and 24 not out against Tanzania, Manji finished the tournament with 195 runs from three innings at an average of 195.00, behind only teammate Malhar Patel (250) and Ugandan Emmanuel Isaneez (197) in runs scored.

Later in October 2003, Sri Lanka A toured Kenya on its return from a series against South Africa A, playing five one-day matches. Manji, then aged 15, was selected for the final match of the tour, played at the Sir Ali Muslim Club Ground in Nairobi. Also a right-arm fast-medium bowler, he did not bowl at all in the match, but did score three not out coming in ninth in the batting order, as Kenya lost by 18 runs. Manji again played for the Kenyan under-19s at the 2005 Africa/EAP Championship, with his 179 runs the best by a Kenyan batsman. In the third-place playoff against Papua New Guinea, he scored 97 from 116 balls, which following an earlier innings of 64 not out against Nigeria. In that match, he was also used as Kenya's wicket-keeper, taking four catches and effecting two stumpings.

Before that under-19s tournament, Manji had been named in an initial 31-man Kenyan squad for a 2005 Intercontinental Cup match against Namibia, without making the final team. However, in March 2006, he was selected in the Kenya A squad for a one-off match against the Netherlands, which came before a Kenya–Netherlands Intercontinental Cup match. The 50-over game was played at Nairobi's Gymkhana Club Ground. Coming in fourth in Kenya's only innings, Manji made nine runs before being caught by Tom de Grooth off of Darron Reekers. That was his last recorded appearance for a Kenyan representative side, but in February 2013 he did play for a "DTB Titans" team in the Cricket Wars tournament, which Cricket Kenya had refused to sanction.
