= 2018 Under-19 Cricket World Cup =

Cricket tournament

2018 ICC Under-19 Cricket World Cup
- Dates: 13 January – 3 February 2018
- Administrator: International Cricket Council (ICC)
- Cricket format: Limited-overs (50 overs)
- Tournament format(s): Round-robin and knockout
- Host: New Zealand
- Champions: India (4th title)
- Runners-up: Australia
- Participants: 16
- Matches: 48
- Player of the series: (India) Shubman Gill
- Most runs: (Cricket West Indies) Alick Athanaze (418)
- Most wickets: (India) Anukul Roy (14) (Afghanistan) Qais Ahmad (14) (Canada) Faisal Jamkhandi (14)
- Official website: Official website

The 2018 ICC Under-19 Cricket World Cup was an international limited-overs cricket tournament held in New Zealand from 13 January till 3 February 2018. It was the twelfth edition of the U19 World Cup, and the third to be held in New Zealand after the 2002 and the 2010 events. New Zealand became the first country to host the event thrice. The opening ceremony took place on 7 January 2018. The West Indies were the defending champions. However, they failed to go past the group stage, after losing their first two group fixtures.

Following the group stage fixtures, Afghanistan, Australia, Bangladesh, England, India, New Zealand, Pakistan and South Africa had all qualified for the Super League quarter-final stage of the tournament. The other eight teams moved to the Plate League to determine their final placements in the competition. Sri Lanka went on to win the Plate League, giving them a final position of ninth overall in the tournament.

In the first Super League semi-final, Australia defeated Afghanistan by 6 wickets to progress to the final. In the second semi-final, India defeated Pakistan by 203 runs to advance into the final. In the third-place playoff, no play was possible due to rain and a wet outfield. Pakistan therefore finished in third place, as they finished their group ahead of Afghanistan on net run rate. In the final, India defeated Australia by 8 wickets to win their fourth Under-19 World Cup title.

== Qualification ==
The ten full members of the International Cricket Council (ICC), as of 2016, qualified automatically for the tournament. Namibia, which placed seventh at the 2016 World Cup, also qualified automatically as the highest ranked associate member. The other five places in the tournament were awarded to the winners of the five regional under-19 tournaments.

Team	Mode of qualification
Australia	ICC Full Member
Bangladesh	ICC Full Member
England	ICC Full Member
India	ICC Full Member
New Zealand	ICC Full Member
Pakistan	ICC Full Member
South Africa	ICC Full Member
Sri Lanka	ICC Full Member
West Indies	ICC Full Member
Zimbabwe	ICC Full Member
Namibia	Highest-ranked associate team at 2016 World Cup
Afghanistan	Champion of ACC Under-19 Premier League
Kenya	Champion of Africa Under-19 Championship
Canada	Champion of Americas Under-19 Championship
Papua New Guinea	Champion of EAP Under-19 Trophy
Ireland	Champion of Europe Under-19 Championship

== Venues ==
Seven venues in six cities will host matches at the 2018 World Cup:
- Hagley Oval, Christchurch
- Rangiora Oval, Rangiora
- Bert Sutcliffe Oval, Lincoln
- Lincoln Green, Lincoln
- John Davies Oval, Queenstown
- Bay Oval, Mount Maunganui
- Cobham Oval, Whangārei

== Umpires ==
On 3 January 2018, the ICC appointed the officials for the tournament. Along with the seventeen umpires, Jeff Crowe, Dev Govindjee, David Jukes and Graeme Labrooy were also named as the match referees.

- Rob Bailey
- Sourav Ramos Chouhan
- Anil Chaudhary
- Nigel Duguid
- Shaun George
- Shaun Haig
- Mark Hawthorne
- Ranmore Martinesz
- C. K. Nandan
- David Odhiambo
- Buddhi Pradhan
- Ian Ramage
- Ahsan Raza
- Shozab Raza
- Tim Robinson
- Langton Rusere
- Paul Wilson

== Squads ==
Each team selected a 15-man squad for the tournament. Any players born on or after 1 September 1998 were eligible to be selected for the competition.

== Group stage ==
The fixtures for the tournament were confirmed by the ICC on 17 August 2017.

=== Group A ===
Pos	Team	Pld	W	L	T	NR	Pts	NRR
1	New Zealand	3	3	0	0	0	6	2.576
2	South Africa	3	2	1	0	0	4	1.160
3	West Indies	3	1	2	0	0	2	0.660
4	Kenya	3	0	3	0	0	0	−4.227

13 January 2018
14:00
Scorecard

West Indies; 233/8 (50 overs)	v	New Zealand; 234/2 (39.3 overs)
Keagan Simmons 92* (132); Rachin Ravindra 3/30 (7 overs)		Finn Allen 115* (100); Alick Athanaze 1/22 (4 overs)

New Zealand won by 8 wickets
Bay Oval, Mount Maunganui
Umpires: Ahsan Raza (Pak) and Shaun George (SA)
Player of the match: Finn Allen (NZ)

- New Zealand won the toss and elected to field.

14 January 2018
10:30
Scorecard

South Africa; 341/7 (50 overs)	v	Kenya; 172/7 (50 overs)
Raynard van Tonder 143 (121); Jasraj Kundi 2/49 (8 overs)		Jasraj Kundi 41 (53); Akhona Mnyaka 2/9 (4 overs)

South Africa won by 169 runs
Lincoln Green, Lincoln
Umpires: Ian Ramage (Sco) and Langton Rusere (Zim)
Player of the match: Raynard van Tonder (SA)

- South Africa won the toss and elected to bat.

17 January 2018
10:30
Scorecard

New Zealand; 436/4 (50 overs)	v	Kenya; 193/4 (50 overs)
Jakob Bhula 180 (144); Sukhdeep Singh 1/29 (2 overs)		Aman Gandhi 63 (106); Rachin Ravindra 2/33 (10 overs)

New Zealand won by 243 runs
Hagley Oval, Christchurch
Umpires: Mark Hawthorne (Ire) and Ian Ramage (Sco)
Player of the match: Jakob Bhula (NZ)

- Kenya won the toss and elected to field.

17 January 2018
14:00
Scorecard

South Africa; 282/8 (50 overs)	v	West Indies; 206 (45.3 overs)
Wandile Makwetu 99* (99); Jeavor Royal 1/34 (10 overs)		Alick Athanaze 76 (100); Hermann Rolfes 4/33 (10 overs)

South Africa won by 76 runs
Bay Oval, Mount Maunganui
Umpires: Ahsan Raza (Pak) and Langton Rusere (Zim)
Player of the match: Wandile Makwetu (SA)

- West Indies won the toss and elected to field.
- New Zealand and South Africa qualified for the Super League quarter-finals as a result of this match.

20 January 2018
10:30
Scorecard

West Indies; 318/7 (50 overs)	v	Kenya; 96 (24.4 overs)
Alick Athanaze 116* (93); Aveet Desai 3/54 (10 overs)		Aman Gandhi 37 (42); Bhaskar Yadram 5/18 (7 overs)

West Indies won by 222 runs
Lincoln Green, Lincoln
Umpires: C. K. Nandan (Ind) and Shozab Raza (Pak)
Player of the match: Alick Athanaze (WI)

- West Indies won the toss and elected to bat.

20 January 2018
14:00
Scorecard

New Zealand; 279/8 (50 overs)	v	South Africa; 208 (46.2 overs)
Rachin Ravindra 76 (89); Kgaudise Molefe 2/49 (10 overs)		Hermann Rolfes 108 (124); Rachin Ravindra 4/32 (9.2 overs)

New Zealand won by 71 runs
Bay Oval, Mount Maunganui
Umpires: Nigel Duguid (WI) and Paul Wilson (Aus)
Player of the match: Rachin Ravindra (NZ)

- New Zealand won the toss and elected to bat.

=== Group B ===
Pos	Team	Pld	W	L	T	NR	Pts	NRR
1	India	3	3	0	0	0	6	3.930
2	Australia	3	2	1	0	0	4	2.721
3	Zimbabwe	3	1	2	0	0	2	−3.031
4	Papua New Guinea	3	0	3	0	0	0	−5.614

13 January 2018
10:30
Scorecard

Papua New Guinea; 95 (20 overs)	v	Zimbabwe; 98/0 (14 overs)
Igo Mahuru 26 (26); Wesley Madhevere 3/19 (4 overs)		Wesley Madhevere 53* (44)

Zimbabwe won by 10 wickets
Lincoln Green, Lincoln
Umpires: Nigel Duguid (WI) and Ranmore Martinesz (SL)
Player of the match: Wesley Madhevere (Zim)

- Zimbabwe won the toss and elected to field.
- Rain reduced the match to 20 overs per side.

14 January 2018
14:00
Scorecard

India; 328/7 (50 overs)	v	Australia; 228 (42.5 overs)
Prithvi Shaw 94 (100); Jack Edwards 4/65 (9 overs)		Jack Edwards 73 (90); Kamlesh Nagarkoti 3/29 (7 overs)

India won by 100 runs
Bay Oval, Mount Maunganui
Umpires: Rob Bailey (Eng) and Tim Robinson (Eng)
Player of the match: Prithvi Shaw (Ind)

- India won the toss and elected to bat.

16 January 2018
14:00
Scorecard

Papua New Guinea; 64 (21.5 overs)	v	India; 67/0 (8 overs)
Ovia Sam 15 (25); Anukul Roy 5/14 (6.5 overs)		Prithvi Shaw 57* (39)

India won by 10 wickets
Bay Oval, Mount Maunganui
Umpires: Ranmore Martinesz (SL) and Shozab Raza (Pak)
Player of the match: Anukul Roy (Ind)

- India won the toss and elected to field.

17 January 2018
10:30
Scorecard

Zimbabwe; 134 (33.2 overs)	v	Australia; 135/3 (18.2 overs)
Robert Chimhinya 27 (31); Xavier Bartlett 3/20 (7 overs)		Max Bryant 44 (27); Liam Roche 1/14 (3 overs)

Australia won by 7 wickets
Lincoln Green, Lincoln
Umpires: Shaun Haig (NZ) and David Odhiambo (Ken)
Player of the match: Xavier Bartlett (Aus)

- Australia won the toss and elected to field.

19 January 2018
10:30
Scorecard

Australia; 370/8 (50 overs)	v	Papua New Guinea; 59 (24.5 overs)
Nathan McSweeney 156 (154); James Tau 2/42 (10 overs)		Leke Morea 20 (66); Jason Ralston 7/15 (6.5 overs)

Australia won by 311 runs
Lincoln Green, Lincoln
Umpires: C. K. Nandan (Ind) and Shozab Raza (Pak)
Player of the match: Nathan McSweeney (Aus)

- Papua New Guinea won the toss and elected to field.
- Jason Ralston (Aus) took the best bowling figures in a group stage match at the U19 Cricket World Cup. However, his record was surpassed by Lloyd Pope who took the best bowling figures of 8/35 in U19 Cricket World Cup history in the knockout stages.

19 January 2018
14:00
Scorecard

Zimbabwe; 154 (48.1 overs)	v	India; 155/0 (21.4 overs)
Milton Shumba 36 (59); Anukul Roy 4/20 (7.1 overs)		Shubman Gill 90* (59)

India won by 10 wickets
Bay Oval, Mount Maunganui
Umpires: Ranmore Martinesz (SL) and Paul Wilson (Aus)
Player of the match: Shubman Gill (Ind)

- Zimbabwe won the toss and elected to bat.
- India and Australia qualified for the Super League quarter-finals as a result of this match.

=== Group C ===
Pos	Team	Pld	W	L	T	NR	Pts	NRR
1	England	3	3	0	0	0	6	4.165
2	Bangladesh	3	2	1	0	0	4	0.438
3	Canada	3	1	2	0	0	2	−2.107
4	Namibia	3	0	3	0	0	0	−2.689

13 January 2018
10:30
Scorecard

Bangladesh; 190/4 (20 overs)	v	Namibia; 103/6 (20 overs)
Saif Hassan 84 (48); Dewald Nell 1/22 (3 overs)		Eben van Wyk 55 (52); Hasan Mahmud 2/12 (4 overs)

Bangladesh won by 87 runs
Bert Sutcliffe Oval, Lincoln
Umpires: Anil Chaudhary (Ind) and Paul Wilson (Aus)
Player of the match: Saif Hassan (Ban)

- Namibia won the toss and elected to field.
- Rain reduced the match to 20 overs per side.

15 January 2018
10:30
Scorecard

Bangladesh; 264/8 (50 overs)	v	Canada; 198 (49.3 overs)
Towhid Hridoy 122 (126); Faisal Jamkhandi 5/48 (8 overs)		Arslan Khan 63 (108); Afif Hossain 5/43 (10 overs)

Bangladesh won by 66 runs
Bert Sutcliffe Oval, Lincoln
Umpires: Mark Hawthorne (Ire) and Buddhi Pradhan (Nep)
Player of the match: Afif Hossain (Ban)

- Canada won the toss and elected to field.

15 January 2018
10:30
Scorecard

Namibia; 196/9 (50 overs)	v	England; 198/2 (24.1 overs)
Shaun Fouché 44 (75); Luke Hollman 3/41 (10 overs)		Will Jacks 73* (44); Gerhard Lottering 2/33 (4 overs)

England won by 8 wickets
John Davies Oval, Queenstown
Umpires: Gregory Brathwaite (WI) and Anil Chaudhary (Ind)
Player of the match: Will Jacks (Eng)

- Namibia won the toss and elected to bat.

18 January 2018
10:30
Scorecard

Namibia; 193 (46 overs)	v	Canada; 197/6 (42 overs)
Lo-handre Louwrens 38 (52); Akash Gill 4/43 (8 overs)		Arslan Khan 72 (89); Petrus Burger 2/29 (10 overs)

Canada won by 4 wickets
Bert Sutcliffe Oval, Lincoln
Umpires: Mark Hawthorne (Ire) and Ian Ramage (Sco)
Player of the match: Akash Gill (Can)

- Namibia won the toss and elected to bat.

18 January 2018
10:30
Scorecard

Bangladesh; 175 (49.2 overs)	v	England; 177/3 (29.3 overs)
Afif Hossain 63 (85); Ethan Bamber 3/19 (6 overs)		Harry Brook 102* (84); Qazi Onik 1/19 (4 overs)

England won by 7 wickets
John Davies Oval, Queenstown
Umpires: Gregory Brathwaite (WI) and Anil Chaudhary (Ind)
Player of the match: Harry Brook (Eng)

- Bangladesh won the toss and elected to bat.

20 January 2018
10:30
Scorecard

England; 383/7 (50 overs)	v	Canada; 101 (31.5 overs)
Liam Banks 120 (114); Faisal Jamkhandi 3/68 (9 overs)		Pranav Sharma 24 (42); Prem Sisodiya 3/23 (10 overs)

England won by 282 runs
John Davies Oval, Queenstown
Umpires: Shaun George (SA) and Buddhi Pradhan (Nep)
Player of the match: Liam Banks (Eng)

- Canada won the toss and elected to field.
- England and Bangladesh qualified for the Super League quarter-finals as a result of this match.

=== Group D ===
Pos	Team	Pld	W	L	T	NR	Pts	NRR
1	Pakistan	3	2	1	0	0	4	1.404
2	Afghanistan	3	2	1	0	0	4	0.333
3	Sri Lanka	3	1	2	0	0	2	−0.108
4	Ireland	3	1	2	0	0	2	−1.896

13 January 2018
10:30
Scorecard

Pakistan; 188 (47.4 overs)	v	Afghanistan; 194/5 (47.3 overs)
Rohail Nazir 81 (105); Azmatullah Omarzai 3/34 (7.4 overs)		Darwish Rasooli 76 (78); Hassan Khan 2/45 (10 overs)

Afghanistan won by 5 wickets
Cobham Oval, Whangārei
Umpires: David Odhiambo (Ken) and Buddhi Pradhan (Nep)
Player of the match: Darwish Rasooli (Afg)

- Afghanistan won the toss and elected to bowl.

14 January 2018
10:30
Scorecard

Ireland; 207/8 (48 overs)	v	Sri Lanka; 208/3 (37.3 overs)
Jamie Grassi 75 (117); Kamindu Mendis 3/35 (10 overs)		Dhananjaya Lakshan 101* (120); Aaron Cawley 2/26 (6 overs)

Sri Lanka won by 7 wickets
Cobham Oval, Whangārei
Umpires: Shaun Haig (NZ) and C. K. Nandan (Ind)
Player of the match: Dhananjaya Lakshan (SL)

- Ireland won the toss and elected to bat.
- Rain reduced the match to 48 overs per side.

16 January 2018
10:30
Scorecard

Ireland; 97 (28.5 overs)	v	Pakistan; 98/1 (8.5 overs)
Josh Little 24* (20); Shaheen Afridi 6/15 (8.5 overs)		Zaid Alam 43* (19); Aaron Cawley 1/27 (3 overs)

Pakistan won by 9 wickets
Cobham Oval, Whangārei
Umpires: Rob Bailey (Eng) and C. K. Nandan (Ind)
Player of the match: Shaheen Afridi (Pak)

- Pakistan won the toss and elected to field.

17 January 2018
10:30
Scorecard

Afghanistan; 284/7 (50 overs)	v	Sri Lanka; 202 (37.3 overs)
Ibrahim Zadran 86 (112); Nipun Malinga 2/56 (10 overs)		Jehan Daniel 48 (57); Naveen-ul-Haq 4/35 (8 overs)

Afghanistan won by 32 runs (DLS method)
Cobham Oval, Whangārei
Umpires: C. K. Nandan (Ind) and Tim Robinson (Eng)
Player of the match: Ibrahim Zadran (Afg)

- Sri Lanka won the toss and elected to field.
- Rain reduced the match to 38 overs due to rain.
- Afghanistan qualified for the Super League quarter-finals as a result of this match.

19 January 2018
10:30
Scorecard

Sri Lanka; 188 (48.2 overs)	v	Pakistan; 190/7 (43.3 overs)
Jehan Daniel 53 (70); Thisaru Rashmika 3/47 (9 overs)		Ali Zaryab 59 (94); Suleman Shafqat 3/29 (7.2 overs)

Pakistan won by 3 wickets
Cobham Oval, Whangārei
Umpires: David Odhiambo (Ken) and Langton Rusere (Zim)
Player of the match: Ali Zaryab (Pak)

- Pakistan won the toss and elected to field.
- Pakistan qualified for the Super League quarter-finals as a result of this match.

20 January 2018
10:30
Scorecard

Ireland; 225/8 (50 overs)	v	Afghanistan; 221 (49.2 overs)
Graham Kennedy 37* (24); Qais Ahmad 3/32 (10 overs)		Bahir Shah 34 (49); Harry Tector 3/37 (10 overs)

Ireland won by 4 runs
Cobham Oval, Whangārei
Umpires: Shaun Haig (NZ) and David Odhiambo (Ken)
Player of the match: Harry Tector (Ire)

- Afghanistan won the toss and elected to field.

== Plate League ==
13th-place playoff
D4	Ireland	288/6 (50)
C4	Namibia	186 (39.1)
15th-place playoff
B4	Papua New Guinea	162 (48.3)
A4	Kenya	176 (50)

Plate playoff semi-finals
B4	Papua New Guinea	121 (37.1)
D4	Ireland	122/7 (41.5)
C4	Namibia	180/2 (27)
A4	Kenya	176 (46.5)

Plate quarter-finals
C3	Canada	295/8 (50)
B4	Papua New Guinea	185 (44.3)
A3	West Indies	281/6 (48.2)
D4	Ireland	278/8 (50)
B3	Zimbabwe	114/3 (19.3)
C4	Namibia	113 (40.1)
D3	Sri Lanka	419/4 (50)
A4	Kenya	108 (35.5)

Plate semi-finals
C3	Canada	136 (47.3)
A3	West Indies	323/8 (50)
B3	Zimbabwe	259/4 (50)
D3	Sri Lanka	260/5 (45.3)

Plate final
A3	West Indies	254/5 (50)
D3	Sri Lanka	255/7 (49.4)
11th-place playoff
C3	Canada	134 (37.5)
B3	Zimbabwe	272/8 (50)

=== Plate quarter-finals ===
22 January 2018
10:30
Scorecard

Canada; 265/8 (50 overs)	v	Papua New Guinea; 185 (44.3 overs)
Akash Gill 120 (127); James Tau 2/37 (9 overs)		Simon Atai 85 (117); Aran Pathmanathan 3/23 (9 overs)

Canada won by 70 runs
Lincoln Green, Lincoln
Umpires: Ian Ramage (Sco) and Shozab Raza (Pak)
Player of the match: Akash Gill (Can)

- Papua New Guinea won the toss and elected to field.

22 January 2018
10:30
Scorecard

Namibia; 113 (40.1 overs)	v	Zimbabwe; 114/3 (19.3 overs)
Eben van Wyk 24 (40); Nkosilathi Nungu 2/11 (3.1 overs)		Wesley Madhevere 47 (38); Gerhard Lottering 1/19 (4 overs)

Zimbabwe won by 7 wickets
Bert Sutcliffe Oval, Lincoln
Umpires: Mark Hawthorne (Ire) and Ranmore Martinesz (SL)
Player of the match: Wesley Madhevere (Zim)

- Namibia won the toss and elected to bat.

23 January 2018
10:30
Scorecard

Sri Lanka; 419/4 (50 overs)	v	Kenya; 108 (35.5 overs)
Hasitha Boyagoda 191 (152); Abhishekh Chidambaran 2/68 (10 overs)		Thomas Ochieng 45 (63); Haren Buddila 4/27 (10 overs)

Sri Lanka won by 311 runs
Lincoln Green, Lincoln
Umpires: Buddhi Pradhan (Nep) and Shozab Raza (Pak)
Player of the match: Hasitha Boyagoda (SL)

- Sri Lanka won the toss and elected to bat.
- Hasitha Boyagoda (SL) made the highest individual score in U19 ODIs as well as in the history of the U19 Cricket World Cup (191).

23 January 2018
10:30
Scorecard

Ireland; 278/8 (50 overs)	v	West Indies; 281/6 (48.2 overs)
Neil Rock 91 (101); Jeavor Royal 3/59 (10 overs)		Nyeem Young 55* (33); Max Neville 2/53 (6 overs)

West Indies won by 4 wickets
Bert Sutcliffe Oval, Lincoln
Umpires: Ranmore Martinesz (SL) and David Odhiambo (Ken)
Player of the match: Nyeem Young (WI)

- Ireland won the toss and elected to bat.

=== Plate playoff semi-finals ===
25 January 2018
10:30
Scorecard

Papua New Guinea; 121 (37.1 overs)	v	Ireland; 122/7 (41.5 overs)
Igo Mahuru 45 (83); Jonathan Garth 4/18 (8.1 overs)		Neil Rock 43 (76); James Tau 4/45 (10 overs)

Ireland won by 3 wickets
Rangiora Recreation Ground, Rangiora
Umpires: Ranmore Martinesz (SL) and Buddhi Pradhan (Nep)
Player of the match: Jonathan Garth (Ire)

- Papua New Guinea won the toss and elected to bat.

25 January 2018
10:30
Scorecard

Kenya; 176 (46.5 overs)	v	Namibia; 180/2 (27 overs)
Aman Gandhi 52 (80); Petrus Burger 5/24 (10 overs)		Lo-handre Louwrens 114 (76); Aveet Desai 1/10 (2 overs)

Namibia won by 8 wickets
Lincoln Green, Lincoln
Umpires: Mark Hawthorne (Ire) and Ian Ramage (Sco)
Player of the match: Lo-handre Louwrens (Nam)

- Namibia won the toss and elected to field.

=== Plate semi-finals ===
25 January 2018
10:30
Scorecard

Zimbabwe; 259/4 (50 overs)	v	Sri Lanka; 260/5 (45.3 overs)
Jayden Schadendorf 74 (78); Thisaru Rashmika 2/58 (10 overs)		Nishan Madushka 109* (135); Nkosilathi Nungu 2/49 (7 overs)

Sri Lanka won by 5 wickets
Bert Sutcliffe Oval, Lincoln
Umpires: David Odhiambo (Ken) and Shozab Raza (Pak)
Player of the match: Nishan Madushka (SL)

- Sri Lanka won the toss and elected to field.

26 January 2018
10:30
Scorecard

West Indies; 323/8 (50 overs)	v	Canada; 136 (47.3 overs)
Keagan Simmons 166 (137); Akash Gill 4/54 (9 overs)		Kavian Naress 61 (112); Ronaldo Alimohamed 2/17 (5 overs)

West Indies won by 187 runs
Bert Sutcliffe Oval, Lincoln
Umpires: Ranmore Martinesz (SL) and Shozab Raza (Pak)
Player of the match: Keagan Simmons (WI)

- West Indies won the toss and elected to bat.

== Super League ==
5th-place playoff
A2	South Africa	180/2 (38.3)
C2	Bangladesh	178 (41.4)
7th-place playoff
A1	New Zealand	229 (47.1)
C1	England	261/7 (50)

Super League playoff semi-finals
C1	England	216 (47.2)
C2	Bangladesh	220/5 (47.3)
A1	New Zealand	211 (43.5)
A2	South Africa	284/6 (50)

Super League quarter-finals
C1	England	96 (23.4)
B2	Australia	127 (33.3)
A1	New Zealand	107 (28.1)
D2	Afghanistan	309/6 (50)
D1	Pakistan	190/7 (47.5)
A2	South Africa	189/9 (50)
B1	India	265 (49.2)
C2	Bangladesh	134 (42.1)

Super League semi-finals
B2	Australia	182/4 (37.3)
D2	Afghanistan	181 (48)
D1	Pakistan	69 (29.3)
B1	India	272/9 (50)

Final
B1	India	220/2 (38.5)
B2	Australia	216 (47.2)
3rd-place playoff
D1	Pakistan
D2	Afghanistan

=== Super League quarter-finals ===
23 January 2018
10:30
Scorecard

Australia; 127 (33.3 overs)	v	England; 96 (23.4 overs)
Jason Sangha 58 (91); Will Jacks 3/21 (7 overs)		Tom Banton 58 (53); Lloyd Pope 8/35 (9.4 overs)

Australia won by 31 runs
John Davies Oval, Queenstown
Umpires: Gregory Brathwaite (WI) and Langton Rusere (Zim)
Player of the match: Lloyd Pope (Aus)

- Australia won the toss and elected to bat.
- Lloyd Pope (Aus) took the best bowling figures in a U19 World Cup match.

24 January 2018
10:30
Scorecard

South Africa; 189/9 (50 overs)	v	Pakistan; 190/7 (47.5 overs)
Wandile Makwetu 60 (65); Muhammad Musa 3/29 (10 overs)		Ali Zaryab 74* (111); Jason Niemand 2/31 (10 overs)

Pakistan won by 3 wickets
Hagley Oval, Christchurch
Umpires: C. K. Nandan (Ind) and Paul Wilson (Aus)
Player of the match: Ali Zaryab (Pak)

- Pakistan won the toss and elected to field.

25 January 2018
10:30
Scorecard

Afghanistan; 309/6 (50 overs)	v	New Zealand; 107 (28.1 overs)
Rahmanullah Gurbaz 69 (67); Sandeep Patel 2/13 (3 overs)		Katene Clarke 38 (56); Mujeeb Ur Rahman 4/14 (8.1 overs)

Afghanistan won by 202 runs
Hagley Oval, Christchurch
Umpires: Anil Chaudhary (Ind) and Tim Robinson (Eng)
Player of the match: Azmatullah Omarzai (Afg)

- Afghanistan won the toss and elected to bat.

26 January 2018
10:30
Scorecard

India; 265 (49.2 overs)	v	Bangladesh; 134 (42.1 overs)
Shubman Gill 86 (94); Qazi Onik 3/48 (10 overs)		Pinak Ghosh 43 (75); Kamlesh Nagarkoti 3/18 (7.1 overs)

India won by 131 runs
John Davies Oval, Queenstown
Umpires: Nigel Duguid (WI) and Shaun George (SA)
Player of the match: Shubman Gill (Ind)

- India won the toss and elected to bat.

=== Super League playoff semi-finals ===
27 January 2018
10:30
Scorecard

South Africa; 284/6 (50 overs)	v	New Zealand; 211 (43.5 overs)
Raynard van Tonder 117 (129); Matthew Fisher 2/59 (9 overs)		Dale Phillips 74 (82); Gerald Coetzee 5/32 (9.5 overs)

South Africa won by 73 runs
Hagley Oval, Christchurch
Umpires: C. K. Nandan (Ind) and Paul Wilson (Aus)
Player of the match: Raynard van Tonder (SA)

- South Africa won the toss and elected to bat.

28 January 2018
10:30
Scorecard

England; 216 (47.2 overs)	v	Bangladesh; 220/5 (47.3 overs)
Liam Banks 74 (82); Afif Hossain 3/18 (5.2 overs)		Afif Hossain 71 (86); Adam Finch 2/36 (8 overs)

Bangladesh won by 5 wickets
John Davies Oval, Queenstown
Umpires: Nigel Duguid (WI) and Langton Rusere (Zim)
Player of the match: Afif Hossain (Ban)

- Bangladesh won the toss and elected to field.

=== Super League semi-finals ===
29 January 2018
10:30
Scorecard

Afghanistan; 181 (48 overs)	v	Australia; 182/4 (37.3 overs)
Ikram Alikhil 80 (119); Jonathan Merlo 4/24 (10 overs)		Jack Edwards 72 (65); Qais Ahmad 2/35 (10 overs)

Australia won by 6 wickets
Hagley Oval, Christchurch
Umpires: Shaun George (SA) and Tim Robinson (Eng)
Player of the match: Jack Edwards (Aus)

- Afghanistan won the toss and elected to bat.

30 January 2018
10:30
Scorecard

India; 272/9 (50 overs)	v	Pakistan; 69 (29.3 overs)
Shubman Gill 102* (94); Muhammad Musa 4/67 (10 overs)		Rohail Nazir 18 (39); Ishan Porel 4/17 (6 overs)

India won by 203 runs
Hagley Oval, Christchurch
Umpires: Gregory Brathwaite (WI) and Paul Wilson (Aus)
Player of the match: Shubman Gill (Ind)

- India won the toss and elected to bat.

== Placement matches ==
=== 15th-place playoff ===
27 January 2018
10:30
Scorecard

Kenya; 176 (50 overs)	v	Papua New Guinea; 162 (48.3 overs)
Jayant Mepani 44 (79); Semo Kamea 3/24 (10 overs)		Nou Rarua 47 (94); Gerard Mwendwa 4/37 (9.3 overs)

Kenya won by 14 runs
Rangiora Recreation Ground, Rangiora
Umpires: Mark Hawthorne (Ire) and Buddhi Pradhan (Nep)
Player of the match: Jayant Mepani (Ken)

- Kenya won the toss and elected to bat.

=== 13th-place playoff ===
27 January 2018
10:30
Scorecard

Ireland; 288/6 (50 overs)	v	Namibia; 186 (39.1 overs)
Harry Tector 101 (113); Mauritius Ngupita 2/41 (10 overs)		Lo-handre Louwrens 62 (88); Josh Little 3/33 (6.1 overs)

Ireland won by 102 runs
Lincoln Green, Lincoln
Umpires: David Odhiambo (Ken) and Ian Ramage (Sco)
Player of the match: Harry Tector (Ire)

- Namibia won the toss and elected to field.

=== 11th-place playoff ===
28 January 2018
10:30
Scorecard

Zimbabwe; 272/8 (50 overs)	v	Canada; 134 (37.5 overs)
Wesley Madhevere 93 (84); Faisal Jamkhandi 2/65 (9 overs)		Akash Gill 60 (63); Wesley Madhevere 4/24 (7.5 overs)

Zimbabwe won by 138 runs
Rangiora Recreation Ground, Rangiora
Umpires: Ranmore Martinesz (SL) and Ian Ramage (Sco)
Player of the match: Wesley Madhevere (Zim)

- Zimbabwe won the toss and elected to bat.

=== 9th-place playoff (Plate Final) ===
28 January 2018
10:30
Scorecard

West Indies; 254/5 (50 overs)	v	Sri Lanka; 255/7 (49.4 overs)
Alick Athanaze 110* (110); Praveen Jayawickrama 2/33 (10 overs)		Hasitha Boyagoda 116 (124); Bhaskar Yadram 2/42 (10 overs)

Sri Lanka won by 3 wickets
Bert Sutcliffe Oval, Lincoln
Umpires: Mark Hawthorne (Ire) and Shozab Raza (Pak)
Player of the match: Hasitha Boyagoda (SL)

- Sri Lanka won the toss and elected to field.

=== 7th-place playoff ===
30 January 2018
10:30
Scorecard

England; 261/7 (50 overs)	v	New Zealand; 229 (47.1 overs)
Tom Banton 112 (122); Luke Georgeson 3/29 (10 overs)		Finn Allen 87 (100); Will Jacks 3/41 (9.1 overs)

England won by 32 runs
John Davies Oval, Queenstown
Umpires: Ian Ramage (Sco) and Shozab Raza (Pak)
Player of the match: Tom Banton (Eng)

- England won the toss and elected to bat.

=== 5th-place playoff ===
31 January 2018
10:30
Scorecard

Bangladesh; 178 (41.4 overs)	v	South Africa; 180/2 (38.3 overs)
Afif Hossain 63 (59); Fraser Jones 5/32 (8 overs)		Raynard van Tonder 82* (99); Roni Hossain 1/21 (7 overs)

South Africa won by 8 wickets
John Davies Oval, Queenstown
Umpires: Mark Hawthorne (Ire) and Ranmore Martinesz (SL)
Player of the match: Fraser Jones (SA)

- Bangladesh won the toss and elected to bat.

=== 3rd-place playoff ===
1 February 2018
10:30
Scorecard

Afghanistan	v	Pakistan

Match abandoned
John Davies Oval, Queenstown
Umpires: Ranmore Martinesz (SL) and Paul Wilson (Aus)

- No toss.
- No play was possible due to a wet outfield.
- Pakistan finished in third place as they finished their group ahead of Afghanistan on net run rate.

=== Final ===
3 February 2018
14:00
Scorecard

Australia; 216 (47.2 overs)	v	India; 220/2 (38.5 overs)
Jonathan Merlo 76 (102); Ishan Porel 2/30 (7 overs)		Manjot Kalra 101* (102); Will Sutherland 1/36 (6.5 overs)

India won by 8 wickets
Bay Oval, Mount Maunganui
Umpires: Gregory Brathwaite (WI) and Shaun George (SA)
Player of the match: Manjot Kalra (Ind)

- Australia won the toss and elected to bat.
- Manjot Kalra (Ind) became the fifth batsman to score a hundred in an U19 World Cup final. In 2020, Kalra was suspended from playing for two years after a police investigation found he had committed age fraud during his junior career.

== Final standings ==
Pos.	Team
1	India
2	Australia
3	Pakistan
4	Afghanistan
5	South Africa
6	Bangladesh
7	England
8	New Zealand
9	Sri Lanka
10	West Indies
11	Zimbabwe
12	Canada
13	Ireland
14	Namibia
15	Kenya
16	Papua New Guinea
