= Matara Sports Club =

Team information
- Founded: 1904
- Home ground: Uyanwatta Stadium

History
- Premier Trophy wins: None
- Premier Limited Overs Tournament wins: None
- Twenty20 Tournament wins: None

Matara Sports Club is a Division III cricket team in Matara, Sri Lanka. It played first-class cricket 1998 to 2001, before being demoted to Division II in 2002, and to Division III in 2014.

The Uyanwatte ground is home to Matara Cricket Club. In the parlour of cricket Matara stands for one thing only, the modern master blaster Sanath Jayasuriya. Jayasuriya played his early cricket here, is revered in the area and from 2010 to 2015 was the MP for the Matara district.

== History ==
The first official team was registered in 1904 and consisted of mainly European tea planters. Leading boys schools in Matara - Rahula, St. Servatius and St. Thomas Colleges have produced great cricketers, and some of them have played for the national team. Sanath Jayasuriya, Pramodya Wickramasinghe, Indiak de Saram, Suraj Randiv, Janak Gamage, Prabhath Nissanka, Kasun Rajitha are some of them. Most of these cricketers started playing club cricket for Matara Sports Club. They won Div II Championship in 1989/90.

== See also ==
- List of Sri Lankan cricket teams
