= Ronald Lutaaya =

Ugandan cricketer (born 2003)

Ronald Lutaaya (born 15 March 2003) is a Ugandan cricketer who represents the Uganda national cricket team. He is a left-handed batter.

== Career ==
Lutaaya was named in Uganda's squad for the 2022 Under-19 Cricket World Cup in the West Indies.

On 30 January 2022, Lutaaya scored 64 runs against Scotland Under-19 in the 13th-place play-off. Uganda made 226 and defeated Scotland by 51 runs under the DLS method, finishing 13th in the tournament.

Lutaaya made his Twenty20 International debut for Uganda against Rwanda in December 2022. He scored 70 runs from 40 balls.

In January 2023, Lutaaya scored 116 runs from 65 balls for the Itanda Kayakers in the final of the Waterfalls Twenty20 Men's Elite League. Itanda Kayakers defeated Bujagali Rafters by 29 runs, and Lutaaya finished first in the tournament's Most Valuable Player rankings.

In 2024, Lutaaya was named as a travelling reserve for Uganda's squad at the 2024 ICC Men's T20 World Cup.

In 2025, Lutaaya trained at the SuperSport Park International Cricket Academy in Centurion, South Africa. He scored 94 runs against North West Academy and 60 against North West Union 1st XI during the programme.

== International career ==
Lutaaya made his T20I debut for Uganda against Rwanda in December 2022, scoring 70 runs from 40 balls.

In 2025, Lutaaya continued to represent Uganda in T20I cricket.

== See also ==
- Uganda national cricket team
- Uganda national under-19 cricket team
- List of Uganda Twenty20 International cricketers
