= Rajesh Varsani =

Kenyan cricketer

Personal information
- Full name: Rajesh Varsani
- Born: 29 July 1982 (age 44); Bhuj, Gujarat, India
- Batting: Right-handed
- Bowling: Right-arm off break
- Role: Occasional wicket-keeper

Career statistics
Competition	List A
Matches	2
Runs scored	58
Batting average	29.00
100s/50s	–/1
Top score	57
Balls bowled	18
Wickets	0
Bowling average	–
5 wickets in innings	–
10 wickets in match	–
Best bowling	–
Catches/stumpings	2/–
- Source: Cricinfo, 21 September 2021

Rajesh Varsani (born 29 July 1982) is an Indian-born Kenyan former cricketer.

Varsani was born at Bhuj in the Indian state of Gujarat in July 1982. He emigrated to Kenya and later made two appearances in List A cricket for the Kenya national cricket team against the United Arab Emirates at Nairobi in the 2011–2013 ICC World Cricket League Championship. He scored 57 runs in the first match, helping Kenya to a 66 runs victory. In the second match he kept wicket in place of Jeshani Naran, though was less successful with the bat, being dismissed for a single run by Saqib Ali. Varsani did not feature again for Kenya following these matches.
