= Ashley van Rooi =

Namibian cricketer (born 1988)

Personal information
- Full name: Ashley van Rooi
- Born: 6 April 1988 (age 38); Namibia
- Batting: Right-handed
- Bowling: Right-arm medium
- Relatives: Burton van Rooi (uncle)

Domestic team information
- Years: Team
- 2009/10: Namibia

Career statistics
Competition	First-class
Matches	2
Runs scored	1
Batting average	–
100s/50s	0/0
Top score	1*
Balls bowled	96
Wickets	0
Bowling average	–
5 wickets in innings	–
10 wickets in match	–
Best bowling	–
Catches/stumpings	1/–
- Source: CricketArchive, 15 October 2011

Ashley van Rooi (born 6 April 1988) is a Namibian cricketer. He made his debut for the Namibian team at the African Under-19 Championship tournament of 2007, playing in all five games for the side.

Van Rooi made his List A debut for the Namibian team when Canada visited the country in 2007. However, van Rooi did not bowl cheaply, with an economy of precisely 7 on his debut.

Van Rooi's uncle, Burton, has played with the Namibian team since 2000, and occupies a similar position to Ashley in the Namibian tailend.

Van Rooi made his first-class debut in October 2009, against Free State.
