= Sean Silver =

Namibian cricketer (born 1990)

Personal information
- Full name: Sean Silver
- Born: 29 March 1990 (age 36); Swakopmund, Erongo Region, Namibia
- Batting: Right-handed
- Bowling: Right-arm medium

International information
- National side: Namibia

Domestic team information
- Years: Team
- 2007/08: Namibia

Career statistics
Competition	First-class	List A
Matches	1	2
Runs scored	65	13
Batting average	32.50	6.50
100s/50s	–/–	–/–
Top score	43	13
Balls bowled	–	–
Wickets	–	–
Bowling average	–	–
5 wickets in innings	–	–
10 wickets in match	–	–
Best bowling	–	–
Catches/stumpings	2/–	–/–
- Source: CricketArchive (subscription required), 16 October 2011

Sean Silver (born March 29, 1990) is a Namibian cricketer. Silver made his cricketing debut for Namibia Under-19s in 2007, when he played against Kenya in the Africa Under-19 Championship.

His debut saw him open with former Namibian Under-15s and Under-17s captain Raymond van Schoor, though he was bowled out by young Kenyan bowler Elijah Otieno. The Namibian team were to improve on this early form, coming back with wins over the other two teams in their pool, with Silver making a century in the final preliminary match against Ghana, thus leading Namibia into the semi-finals.

Silver continued his impressive form in the semi-finals, once again scoring a century against Uganda, and completing a 168-run opening partnership with van Schoor, whose father Melt retired from cricket in 2005. Silver hit a half-century in the final to assist Namibia to a win in the tournament.

Having had such good form in the youth competition, it was only a matter of time before he stepped up to play for the senior team, for whom he made his first-class debut on October 18, 2007, in a three-day match.
