= Henno Prinsloo =

Namibian cricketer (born 1987)

Personal information
- Full name: Henno Stephanus Prinsloo
- Born: 5 March 1987 (age 39); Windhoek, South-West Africa
- Batting: Right-handed
- Bowling: Right-arm medium-fast

International information
- National side: Namibia

Domestic team information
- Years: Team
- 2006/07: Namibia

Career statistics
| Competition | First-class | List A |
|---|---|---|
| Matches | 8 | 5 |
| Runs scored | 88 | 88 |
| Batting average | 7.33 | 22.00 |
| 100s/50s | –/– | –/– |
| Top score | 29 | 35 |
| Balls bowled | 342 | 48 |
| Wickets | 8 | 2 |
| Bowling average | 29.12 | 17.00 |
| 5 wickets in innings | – | – |
| 10 wickets in match | – | – |
| Best bowling | 3/26 | 2/13 |
| Catches/stumpings | 5/– | 3/– |
- Source: CricketArchive (subscription required), 16 October 2011

Henno Prinsloo (born 5 March 1987) is a Namibian cricketer. He is a right-handed batsman and a right-arm medium-fast bowler. He has played in the senior Namibian cricket team in first-class cricket since 2006, having played for the Under-19s since the previous year. He represented Namibia in the Under-19 World Cup in 2006. He made his first-class cricket debut on 11 May 2006, for Namibia against Scotland in the 2006–07 ICC Intercontinental Cup.
