= Burton van Rooi =

Namibian cricketer

Personal information
- Full name: Burton Oliver van Rooi
- Born: 9 July 1982 (age 44); Windhoek, South West Africa
- Batting: Right-handed
- Bowling: Right-arm medium
- Role: Bowler
- Relatives: Ashley van Rooi (nephew)

International information
- National side: Namibia (2001–2007)
- ODI debut (cap 15): 23 February 2003 v India
- Last ODI: 3 March 2003 v Netherlands

Career statistics
Competition	ODI	FC	LA
Matches	3	6	10
Runs scored	26	111	70
Batting average	26.00	22.20	11.66
100s/50s	0/0	0/0	0/0
Top score	17	43*	18
Balls bowled	120	450	363
Wickets	1	10	8
Bowling average	119.00	31.00	45.62
5 wickets in innings	0	0	0
10 wickets in match	0	0	0
Best bowling	1/24	4/23	4/40
Catches/stumpings	0/–	1/–	0/–
- Source: ESPNcricinfo, 22 June 2017

Burton van Rooi (born 9 July 1982) is a Namibian cricketer. He is a right-handed batsman and right-arm medium-pace bowler. He made his international debut in February 2003. He rose to prominence through the national development programme in Namibia. Van Rooi's nephew, Ashley van Rooi, made his Under-19s debut during the 2007 Under-19 African Championship.

== Career ==
He featured in the 2000 Under-19 Cricket World Cup which was held in Sri Lanka and it eventually marked his debut appearance at the ICC U-19 Cricket World Cup.

He was a key member of the Namibian squad which reached the final of the 2001 ICC Trophy where Namibia enjoyed 10 consecutive wins on the trot before losing to the Netherlands on the final ball of the 2001 ICC Trophy Final. Netherlands managed to chase 196 on the final ball of the match to seal the deal but Namibia was able to qualify for the 2003 Cricket World Cup. He emerged as the leading wicket-taker for Namibia during the 2001 ICC Trophy by claiming 19 scalps in 8 matches at an incredible bowling average of 11.31 and was also the third joint highest wicket-taker of the competition alongside Sanjayan Thuraisingam of Canada and Khurram Khan of the United Arab Emirates. During a crucial Super League match against Scotland, he ran through the Scottish middle and lower order with the tournament's best bowling figures of 6/43. During the 2001 ICC Trophy, he was noted for his ability and skillsets when it comes down to consistently pitching the ball into the blockhole during the finishing stages of matches at the death.

He played at the 2002 Under-19 Cricket World Cup which was his second consecutive appearance at an ICC U-19 World Cup tournament. During the 2002 Under-19 Cricket World Cup, he starred with the ball against Sri Lanka by picking up 4/27 which restricted Sri Lanka to 141 all out inside 41 overs and he also contributed with the bat in the same match during the low scoring runchase of 142 by remaining unbeaten on 29 off 59 deliveries. His heroics with both the bat and ball inspired Namibia Under-19 side to pull off a sensational stunning win over giants Sri Lanka which is considered to be one of the biggest upsets of all time in the history of the ICC U-19 World Cups.

Just before the all-important 2003 World Cup, Namibia dealt a huge blow with regards to van Rooi's fitness issues as he sustained back problems in 2002. He was able to recover well on time before Namibia's historic World Cup appearance. He was included in the Namibian national squad for the 2003 Cricket World Cup which also marked Namibia's maiden appearance in the Cricket World Cup. He made his ODI as well as international debut during Namibia's group stage match against India on 23 February 2003 which Namibia lost by a margin of 181 runs. His last international appearance came during Namibia's final group stage match against the Netherlands on 3 March 2003 during the World Cup. He featured in only three World Cup matches out of the six matches Namibia had played and his three World Cup appearances were the only international matches he had managed to play in his entire career.

He was also part of the Namibian squad during the 2004 ICC Six Nations Challenge. He made his first-class debut on 26 October 2006 for Namibia against Free State during the 2006/07 SAA Provincial Challenge and on his first-class debut, he claimed seven wickets for the match including a four-wicket haul in the first innings coupled with a three-wicket haul in the second innings. He played his last competitive cricket match in March 2007 which was a first-class match between Namibia and Northerns during the 2006/07 SAA Provincial Challenge.
