= Uganda national under-19 cricket team =

Ugandan sport team

Uganda Under-19s
- Nickname: Baby Cricket Cranes
- Association: Uganda Cricket Association

Personnel
- Captain: Pascal Murungi (2022)
- Coach: Ivan Thawithemwira (2022)

International Cricket Council
- ICC region: Africa

International cricket
- First international: v. West Africa (Kampala; 5 January 2001)

The Uganda Under-19 cricket team represents the nation of Uganda in under-19 cricket at international level.

Uganda has qualified for the Under-19 Cricket World Cup on three occasions—in 2004, 2006 and 2022. The team's best performance came in 2022, when it defeated Scotland in the 13th-place play-off. Uganda has won the ICC U19 Cricket World Cup Africa Qualifier twice, in 2009 and 2021, and placed runner-up on another four occasions.

== History ==
A notable individual performance was Emmanuel Isaneez's 6/37 against Bangladesh in 2004, which at the time was the second-best figures in World Cup history.

As of 2021, the team was coached by former national team player Ivan Thawithemwira.

== Under-19 World Cup record ==
Uganda U19 World Cup record
Year	Result	Pos	№	Pld	W	L	T	NR
(Australia) 1988	Ineligible – not an ICC member (part of East and Central Africa Cricket Conference)							
(South Africa) 1998	Ineligible – not an ICC member (part of East and Central Africa Cricket Conference)							
(Sri Lanka) 2000	Ineligible – not an ICC member (part of East and Central Africa Cricket Conference)							
(New Zealand) 2002	Did not qualify							
(Bangladesh) 2004	First round	14th	16	6	1	5	0	0
(Sri Lanka) 2006	First round	14th	16	6	1	5	0	0
(Malaysia) 2008	Did not qualify							
(New Zealand) 2010	Did not qualify							
(Australia) 2012	Did not qualify							
(United Arab Emirates) 2014	Did not qualify							
(Bangladesh) 2016	Did not qualify							
(New Zealand) 2018	Did not qualify							
(South Africa) 2020	Did not qualify							
(Cricket West Indies) 2022	First round	13th	16	6	2	4	0	0
(South Africa) 2024	Did not qualify							
Total				18	4	14	0	0

== Records ==
All records listed are for under-19 One Day International (ODI) matches only.

=== Team records ===
Highest totals

- 235/5 (47.2 overs), v. Canada, at Chattogram, 27 February 2004
- 226 (35.4 overs), v. Scotland, at Diego Martin, 30 January 2022
- 214/9 (50 overs), v. Scotland, at Colombo, 17 February 2006
- 206 (45.2 overs), v. Ireland, at Chattogram, 23 February 2004
- 197 (48.1 overs), v. Ireland, at Georgetown, 15 January 2022

Lowest totals

- 46 (30.4 overs), v. England, at Chattogram, 17 February 2004
- 74 (33.3 overs), v. Pakistan, at Colombo, 6 February 2006
- 78 (33.3 overs), v. Bangladesh, at Chattogram, 25 February 2004
- 79 (19.4 overs), v. India, at Tarouba, 22 January 2022
- 84 (33.4 overs), v. Bangladesh, at Colombo, 9 February 2006

=== Individual records ===
Most career runs

- 238 – Hamza Almuzahim (2004–2006)
- 191 – Pascal Murungi (2022)
- 158 – Davis Karashani (2004–2006)
- 138 – Cyrus Kakuru (2022)
- 134 – Patrick Ochan (2004–2006)

Highest individual scores

- 99* (148 balls) – Martin Ondeko, v. Canada, at Chattogram, 27 February 2004
- 65 (59 balls) – Cyrus Kakuru, v. Papua New Guinea, at Diego Martin, 28 January 2022
- 64 (78 balls) – Ronald Lutaaya, v. Scotland, at Diego Martin, 30 January 2022
- 64 (81 balls) – Patrick Ochan, v. Scotland, at Colombo, 17 February 2006
- 63 (82 balls) – Pascal Murungi, v. Ireland, at Georgetown, 16 January 2022

Most career wickets

- 17 – Patrick Ochan (2004–2006)
- 14 – Emmanuel Isaneez (2004–2006)
- 13 – Juma Miyaji (2022)
- 10 – Davis Karashani (2004–2006)
- 9 – Ronald Ssemanda (2004–2006), Joseph Baguma (2022), Pascal Murungi (2022)

Best bowling performances

- 6/37 (9.5 overs) – Emmanuel Isaneez, v. Bangladesh, at Chattogram, 25 February 2004
- 4/20 (6 overs) – Emmanuel Isaneez, v. Scotland, at Colombo, 17 February 2006
- 4/25 (8 overs) – Juma Miyaji, v. Scotland, at Diego Martin, 30 January 2022
- 4/29 (9 overs) – Juma Miyaji, v. Papua New Guinea, at Diego Martin, 28 January 2022
- 4/43 (10 overs) – Ronald Ssemanda, v. Bangladesh, at Colombo, 9 February 2006

== Squad ==
=== 2006 ===
The Under-19 team for Uganda which played in the 2006 ICC Under-19 Cricket World Cup was:

- Hamza Almuzahim – Captain
- Davis Arinaitwe
- Emmanuel Isaneez
- Arthur Kyobe
- Dennis Musali
- Patrick Ochan
- Jimmy Okello
- Raymond Otim
- Danniel Ruyange
- Ronald Ssemanda
- Emmanuel Nakaana
- Charles Waiswa
- Roger Mukasa
- Mauneek Solanki

=== 2022 ===
The Under-19 team for Uganda which played in the 2022 Under-19 Cricket World Cup was:

- Pascal Murungi (c)
- Ismail Munir (vc)
- Brian Asaba
- Isaac Ategeka
- Joseph Baguma
- Cyrus Kakuru
- Christopher Kidega
- Ronald Lutaaya
- Juma Miyaji
- Matthew Musinguzi
- Akram Nsubuga
- Edwin Nuwagaba
- Pius Oloka
- Ronald Omara
- Ronald Opio

Fahad Mutagana, Abdallah Muhammad, Raima Musa, Jaffer Ochaya and Yunus Sowobi were also named as reserve players.
