= Jeshani Naran =

Kenyan cricketer

Personal information
- Full name: Jeshani Mansukh Naran
- Born: 20 June 1988 (age 38); Bhuj, Kutch District, Gujarat, India
- Batting: Right-handed
- Role: Wicket-keeper

Career statistics
| Competition | First-class | List A |
|---|---|---|
| Matches | 1 | 1 |
| Runs scored | 7 | 10 |
| Batting average | 3.50 | 10.00 |
| 100s/50s | –/– | –/– |
| Top score | 7 | 10 |
| Catches/stumpings | 1/– | 2/– |
- Source: Cricinfo, 21 September 2021

Jeshani Mansukh Naran (born 20 June 1988) is an Indian-born Kenyan former cricketer.

Varsani was born at Bhuj in the Indian state of Gujarat in June 1988. He emigrated to Kenya and later made a single appearance in first-class cricket for Kenya against the United Arab Emirates in the 2011–2013 ICC Intercontinental Cup at Nairobi in July 2011. Batting twice in the match, he was dismissed for 7 runs in the Kenyan first innings by Mohammad Tauqir, while in their second innings he was dismissed without scoring by Shoaib Sarwar. Three days prior to this match, he made what would be his only appearance in List A cricket against the same opposition, keeping wicket he scored 10 runs before being dismissed by Arshad Ali. In the second match of the one-day series he was replaced as wicket-keeper by Rajesh Varsani. In Kenyan domestic cricket, Naran played for the Eastern Aces in the only edition of the Sahara Elite League in 2008.
