= Uyanwatte Stadium =

Cricket stadium in Sri Lanka

Uyanwatta Stadium
Ground information
- Location: Matara, Sri Lanka
- Coordinates: 5°56′58″N 80°32′57″E
- Establishment: 1884
- Capacity: 15,000
- Owner: Matara Municipal Council
- Tenants: Sri Lanka Cricket; Matara Sports Club
- End names
- Hospital End; Walpola End

International information

Team information
Matara Sports Club	(1904 – present)
- As of 8 November 2001; Source: Cricinfo

Uyanwatta Stadium (Sinhala: උයන්වත්ත ක්‍රීඩාංගණය , Tamil: உயன்வத்டா அரங்கம்) is a multi-use stadium in Matara, Sri Lanka. It is situated on the southern tip of Sri Lanka. The Uyanwatte ground is home to Matara Cricket Club. The ground, which has staged `A' internationals and U19 matches, now looks set for a major period of development.

== History ==
The first cricket match in Matara was held on 28 December 1884 when a Combined Ceylonese Cricket Club played against Matara Cricket Club. There was no Matara Cricket Club during this period and the team was made up of a collection of cricketers who played against visiting teams from the other parts of the island.

The Matara Cricket Club was formally established in 1904, with the bulk of the side being European tea planters. In the early part of the century the ground did not have a pavilion with the players using a shed, which had been erected for the annual Race Meet. In 1966 the president of the Matara Sports Club, Edmund Samarasekera, who continued for 21 years in the position, played a major role in developing the venue. A new pavilion was constructed and contributions from various cricket enthusiasts assisted in completing the building.

The first international side to play in Matara was the Pakistan U23 team in 1973. Former internationals, Pramodya Wickremasinghe and Sanath Jayasuriya both come from Matara. The ground has staged `A' internationals and U19 matches.

== See also ==
- Battle of Golden Lions
