= Patrick Ochan (cricketer) =

Ugandan cricketer (born 1988)

Personal information
- Full name: Partick Ochan
- Born: 8 August 1988 (age 38); Kampala, Uganda
- Batting: Right-handed
- Bowling: Right-arm medium-fast

International information
- National side: Uganda

Career statistics
Competition	List A
Matches	6
Runs scored	19
Batting average	4.75
100s/50s	–/–
Top score	13
Balls bowled	234
Wickets	5
Bowling average	27.60
5 wickets in innings	–
10 wickets in match	–
Best bowling	3/26
Catches/stumpings	–/–
- Source: CricketArchive, 25 January 2011

Patrick Ochan (born 8 August 1988) is an Ugandan cricketer who played in the 2006 U-19 Cricket World Cup in Sri Lanka. He has also played List A cricket for the Uganda national cricket team.

After the 2007 ICC World Cricket League Division Three tournament in Australia, Ochan went on the run and sought asylum in Australia. He is now in Adelaide, playing for West Torrens Cricket Club in the South Australian Grade Cricket competition.

== See also ==
- Uganda Cricket Association
- Frank Nsubuga
