= 2002 Under-19 Cricket World Cup =

2002 ICC Under-19 Cricket World Cup
- Dates: 19 January – 9 February 2002
- Administrator: International Cricket Council
- Cricket format: Limited-overs (50 overs)
- Tournament format(s): Round-robin and Knockout
- Host: New Zealand
- Champions: Australia (2nd title)
- Runners-up: South Africa
- Participants: 16
- Matches: 54
- Player of the series: (Zimbabwe) Tatenda Taibu
- Most runs: (Australia) Cameron White (423)
- Most wickets: (Australia) Xavier Doherty (16) (Zimbabwe) Waddington Mwayenga (16)

The 2002 ICC Under-19 Cricket World Cup was played in New Zealand from 19 January to 9 February 2002. A total of 16 sides competed in the tournament with Australia defeating South Africa in the final. It was the fourth edition of the Under-19 Cricket World Cup and the first to be held in New Zealand. Zimbabwe's Tatenda Taibu was named Man of the Tournament.

== Teams and qualification ==
The ten full members of the ICC qualified automatically:

- Australia
- Bangladesh
- England
- India
- New Zealand
- Pakistan
- South Africa
- Sri Lanka
- West Indies
- Zimbabwe

- Kenya also received automatic qualification as they held ODI status at that time.

Another five teams qualified through regional qualification tournaments:

2001 ICC Africa Under-19 Championship

- Namibia (1st place)

2001 EAP Under-19 Cricket Trophy

- Papua New Guinea (1st place)

2001 ICC Americas Under-19 Championship

- Canada (1st place)

2001 ICC Europe Under-19 Championship

- Scotland (1st place)

2001 Youth Asia Cup

- Nepal (1st place)

== Group stage ==
=== Group A ===
Team	Pld	W	L	T	NR	BP	Pts	NRR
India	3	2	1	0	0	2	10	+1.770
South Africa	3	2	1	0	0	2	10	+1.421
Bangladesh	3	1	1	1	0	1	7	–0.341
Canada	3	0	2	1	0	0	2	–3.187
Source: ESPNCricinfo

20 January
Scorecard

South Africa; 252/4 (50 overs)	v	Bangladesh; 142 (46.2 overs)

South Africa won by 110 runs
Colin Maiden Park, Auckland

21 January
Scorecard

India; 356/5 (50 overs)	v	Canada; 114 (40.2 overs)

India won by 242 runs
Colin Maiden Park, Auckland

22 January
Scorecard

Bangladesh; 213/7 (50 overs)	v	Canada; 213/9 (50 overs)

Match tied
Colin Maiden Park, Auckland

23 January
Scorecard

India; 227/8 (50 overs)	v	South Africa; 156 (42.3 overs)

India won by 71 runs
North Harbour Stadium, North Shore

24 January
Scorecard

India; 77 (32.4 overs)	v	Bangladesh; 78/8 (32.2 overs)

Bangladesh won by 2 wickets
North Harbour Stadium, North Shore

25 January
Scorecard

Canada; 41 (28.4 overs)	v	South Africa; 42/0 (8.2 overs)

South Africa won by 10 wickets
North Harbour Stadium, North Shore

=== Group B ===
Team	Pld	W	L	T	NR	BP	Pts	NRR
New Zealand	3	2	0	0	1	2	12	+3.090
Sri Lanka	3	1	1	0	1	1	7	+0.454
Zimbabwe	3	1	2	0	0	1	5	–0.780
Namibia	3	1	2	0	0	0	4	–1.163
Source: ESPNCricinfo

19 January
Scorecard

Sri Lanka; 85/2 (19.5 overs)	v	New Zealand

No result
Bert Sutcliffe Oval, Lincoln

20 January
Scorecard

Namibia; 111 (29.2 overs)	v	Zimbabwe; 113/1 (19.2 overs)

Zimbabwe won by 9 wickets
Bert Sutcliffe Oval, Lincoln

21 January
Scorecard

Zimbabwe; 71 (36.2 overs)	v	New Zealand; 72/4 (10.3 overs)

New Zealand won by 6 wickets
Bert Sutcliffe Oval, Lincoln

22 January
Scorecard

Sri Lanka; 141 (40.5 overs)	v	Namibia; 142/6 (44.3 overs)

Namibia won by 4 wickets
Bert Sutcliffe Oval, Lincoln

23 January
Scorecard

Namibia; 201/5 (50 overs)	v	New Zealand; 203/4 (36.5 overs)

New Zealand won by 6 wickets
Hagley Oval, Christchurch

24 January
Scorecard

Sri Lanka; 206/9 (50 overs)	v	Zimbabwe; 143 (44.2 overs)

Sri Lanka won by 63 runs
Hagley Oval, Christchurch

=== Group C ===
Team	Pld	W	L	T	NR	BP	Pts	NRR
Pakistan	3	2	1	0	0	1	9	+0.820
England	3	2	1	0	0	1	9	+0.804
Nepal	3	2	1	0	0	1	9	+0.387
Papua New Guinea	3	0	3	0	0	0	0	–2.531
Source: ESPNCricinfo

20 January
Scorecard

Papua New Guinea; 53 (17.5 overs)	v	Pakistan; 54/2 (10.5 overs)

Pakistan won by 8 wickets
Lincoln no. 3 Ground, Lincoln

21 January
Scorecard

England; 204/6 (50 overs)	v	Nepal; 167 (49.2 overs)

England won by 37 runs
Lincoln no. 3 Ground, Lincoln

22 January
Scorecard

Nepal; 151 (48.5 overs)	v	Pakistan; 121 (45.4 overs)

Nepal won by 30 runs
Lincoln Green, Lincoln

23 January
Scorecard

Papua New Guinea; 222/6 (50 overs)	v	England; 223/4 (28 overs)

England won by 6 wickets
Lincoln Green, Lincoln

25 January
Scorecard

England; 182 (48.1 overs)	v	Pakistan; 183/4 (44.4 overs)

Pakistan won by 6 wickets
Lincoln no. 3 Ground, Lincoln

25 January
Scorecard

Nepal; 177 (48.3 overs)	v	Papua New Guinea; 112 (43.5 overs)

Nepal won by 65 runs
Hagley Park no. 2 Ground, Christchurch

=== Group D ===
Team	Pld	W	L	T	NR	BP	Pts	NRR
Australia	3	3	0	0	0	3	15	+4.673
West Indies	3	2	1	0	0	2	10	+2.812
Scotland	3	1	2	0	0	0	4	–4.224
Kenya	3	0	3	0	0	0	0	–5.204
Source: ESPNCricinfo

20 January
Scorecard

Australia; 480/6 (50 overs)	v	Kenya; 50 (21 overs)

Australia won by 430 runs
Carisbrook, Dunedin

21 January
Scorecard

West Indies; 402/3 (50 overs)	v	Scotland; 101 (38.3 overs)

West Indies won by 301 runs
Carisbrook, Dunedin

22 January
Scorecard

Kenya; 113/5 (34.2 overs)	v	Scotland; 125/5 (25 overs)

Scotland won by 5 wickets (D/L method)
Carisbrook, Dunedin

23 January
Scorecard

Australia; 200 (49.2 overs)	v	West Indies; 158 (44.5 overs)

Australia won by 42 runs
Carisbrook, Dunedin

24 January
Scorecard

Kenya; 114 (49.3 overs)	v	West Indies; 115/1 (21 overs)

West Indies won by 9 wickets
Carisbrook, Dunedin

25 January
Scorecard

Australia; 335/5 (50 overs)	v	Scotland; 106 (34.2 overs)

Australia won by 229 runs
Carisbrook, Dunedin

== Plate competition ==
The plate competition was contested by the eight teams that failed to qualify for the Super League.

=== Group 1 ===
Team	Pld	W	L	T	NR	BP	Pts	NRR
Zimbabwe	3	3	0	0	0	3	15	+3.098
Bangladesh	3	2	1	0	0	2	10	+0.232
Kenya	3	1	2	0	0	0	4	–1.652
Papua New Guinea	3	0	3	0	0	0	0	–1.545
Source: ESPNCricinfo

27 January
Scorecard

Papua New Guinea; 75 (22.5 overs)	v	Bangladesh; 76/1 (18.1 overs)

Bangladesh won by 9 wickets
Colin Maiden Park, Auckland

27 January
Scorecard

Zimbabwe; 291/7 (50 overs)	v	Kenya; 80 (30.3 overs)

Zimbabwe won by 211 runs
Eden Park Outer Oval, Auckland

29 January
Scorecard

Kenya; 175/8 (50 overs)	v	Bangladesh; 176/1 (37.4 overs)

Bangladesh won by 9 wickets
North Harbour Stadium, North Shore

29 January
Scorecard

Zimbabwe; 207 (49.2 overs)	v	Papua New Guinea; 141 (45.4 overs)

Zimbabwe won by 66 runs
Melville Park, Auckland

31 January
Scorecard

Bangladesh; 91 (42.5 overs)	v	Zimbabwe; 94/1 (14.2 overs)

Zimbabwe won by 9 wickets
Colin Maiden Park, Auckland

31 January
Scorecard

Kenya; 236/8 (50 overs)	v	Papua New Guinea; 211 (46.4 overs)

Kenya won by 25 runs
Colin Maiden Park no. 2 Ground, Auckland

=== Group 2 ===
Team	Pld	W	L	T	NR	BP	Pts	NRR
Nepal	3	3	0	0	0	2	14	+1.067
Namibia	3	2	1	0	0	1	9	+1.071
Scotland	3	1	2	0	0	1	5	–0.145
Canada	3	0	3	0	0	0	0	–2.191
Source: ESPNCricinfo

28 January
Scorecard

Canada; 102 (46.4 overs)	v	Nepal; 104/1 (22.3 overs)

Nepal won by 9 wickets
Colin Maiden Park, Auckland

28 January
Scorecard

Scotland; 234/4 (50 overs)	v	Namibia; 237/6 (43.3 overs)

Namibia won by 4 wickets
Eden Park Outer Oval, Auckland

30 January
Scorecard

Canada; 157 (48 overs)	v	Scotland; 161/3 (37 overs)

Scotland won by 7 wickets
Melville Park, Auckland

30 January
Scorecard

Nepal; 137 (49.2 overs)	v	Namibia; 127 (48.4 overs)

Nepal won by 10 runs
North Harbour Stadium, North Shore

1 February
Scorecard

Namibia; 226 (46 overs)	v	Canada; 85 (34.4 overs)

Namibia won by 141 runs
Colin Maiden Park no. 2 Ground, Auckland

1 February
Scorecard

Nepal; 205/5 (50 overs)	v	Scotland; 157 (35.2 overs)

Nepal won by 48 runs
Colin Maiden Park, Auckland

=== Semi-finals ===
4 February
Scorecard

Zimbabwe; 228 (50 overs)	v	Namibia; 193 (49.5 overs)
Sean Ervine 72 (78); Burton van Rooi 3/33 (8 overs)		Michael Durant 48 (86); Stuart Matsikenyeri 3/33 (9 overs)

Zimbabwe won by 35 runs
Lincoln no. 3 Ground, Lincoln

- Namibia won the toss and elected to field.

6–7 February
Scorecard

Nepal; 180/6 (50 overs)	v	Bangladesh; 157 (47.3 overs)
Bibhatsu Thapa 41* (52); Syed Rasel 2/41 (10 overs)		Waseluddin Ahmed 37 (68); Bardan Chalise 4/38 (9.3 overs)

Nepal won by 23 runs
Lincoln no. 3 Ground, Lincoln

- Nepal won the toss and elected to bat.

=== Final ===
8 February
Scorecard

Zimbabwe; 247/1 (50 overs)	v	Nepal; 110 (35.4 overs)
Brendan Taylor 100* (130); Sanjam Regmi 1/33 (10 overs)		Shakti Gauchan 30 (41); Hamilton Masakadza 3/16 (5.4 overs)

Zimbabwe won by 137 runs
Lincoln no. 3 Ground, Lincoln

- Zimbabwe won the toss and elected to bat.

== Super League ==
=== Group 1 ===
Team	Pld	W	L	T	NR	BP	Pts	NRR
India	3	2	1	0	0	2	10	+1.053
West Indies	3	2	1	0	0	1	9	+0.007
Pakistan	3	2	1	0	0	1	8	+0.062
Sri Lanka	3	0	3	0	0	0	0	–0.903
Source: ESPNCricinfo

27 January
Scorecard

West Indies; 155/9 (50 overs)	v	India; 157/2 (27.3 overs)

India won by 8 wickets
Bert Sutcliffe Oval, Lincoln

27 January
Scorecard

Pakistan; 184 (48.3 overs)	v	Sri Lanka; 179 (48.5 overs)

Pakistan won by 5 runs
Lincoln no. 3 Ground, Lincoln

29 January
Scorecard

Sri Lanka; 195 (49.4 overs)	v	India; 197/4 (34.4 overs)

India won by 6 wickets
Bert Sutcliffe Oval, Lincoln

29 January
Scorecard

Pakistan; 162 (47.2 overs)	v	West Indies; 166/4 (45 overs)

West Indies won by 6 wickets
Lincoln Green, Lincoln

31 January
Scorecard

India; 181 (48.5 overs)	v	Pakistan; 184/8 (43.4 overs)

Pakistan won by 2 wickets
Lincoln Green, Lincoln

31 January
Scorecard

West Indies; 202 (47.5 overs)	v	Sri Lanka; 140 (47 overs)

West Indies won by 62 runs
Hagley Oval, Christchurch

=== Group 2 ===
Team	Pld	W	L	T	NR	BP	Pts	NRR
Australia	3	3	0	0	0	2	14	+1.277
South Africa	3	2	1	0	0	0	8	+0.155
New Zealand	3	1	2	0	0	0	4	–0.474
England	3	0	3	0	0	0	0	–0.893
Source: ESPNCricinfo

28 January
Scorecard

South Africa; 236/8 (50 overs)	v	Australia; 237/5 (46.4 overs)

Australia won by 5 wickets
Bert Sutcliffe Oval, Lincoln

28 January
Scorecard

New Zealand; 205 (49.4 overs)	v	England; 202/8 (50 overs)

New Zealand won by 3 runs
Lincoln no. 3 Ground, Lincoln

30 January
Scorecard

Australia; 281/5 (50 overs)	v	England; 165 (45.2 overs)

Australia won by 116 runs
Hagley Oval, Christchurch

30 January
Scorecard

South Africa; 241/7 (50 overs)	v	New Zealand; 217 (48.1 overs)

South Africa won by 24 runs
Lincoln Green, Lincoln

1 February
Scorecard

South Africa; 212/5 (50 overs)	v	England; 197 (40 overs)

South Africa won by 15 runs
Lincoln Green, Lincoln

1 February
Scorecard

New Zealand; 194 (46.3 overs)	v	Australia; 196/3 (39.3 overs)

Australia won by 7 wickets
Bert Sutcliffe Oval, Lincoln

=== Semi-finals ===
3 February
Scorecard

South Africa; 268/5 (50 overs)	v	India; 156 (37.4 overs)
Davy Jacobs 69* (45); Chandrashekhar Atram 1/48 (10 overs)		Manvinder Bisla 37 (41); Ian Postman 2/20 (8 overs)

South Africa won by 112 runs
Bert Sutcliffe Oval, Lincoln

- South Africa won the toss and elected to bat.

6–7 February
Scorecard

Australia; 252/8 (50 overs)	v	West Indies; 159 (40 overs)
Craig Simmons 84 (110); Alcindo Holder 2/16 (5 overs)		Tonito Willett 83 (122); Jarrad Burke 2/17 (5 overs)

Australia won by 93 runs
Bert Sutcliffe Oval, Lincoln

- Australia won the toss and elected to bat.

=== Final ===
9 February
Scorecard

South Africa; 206/9 (50 overs)	v	Australia; 209/3 (45.1 overs)
Bob Homani 52* (76); Aaron Bird 4/47 (10 overs)		Jarrad Burke 100* (130); Ryan McLaren 1/35 (10 overs)

Australia won by 7 wickets
Bert Sutcliffe Oval, Lincoln
Umpires: Asoka de Silva (SL) and Tony Hill (NZ)
Player of the match: Aaron Bird (Aus)

- South Africa won the toss and elected to bat.

== Future senior players ==
Future players that featured for their national team in the tournament were:

Team	Future senior cricketers
Australia	Cameron White; George Bailey; Beau Casson; Daniel Christian; Xavier Doherty; Shaun Marsh; Mark Cosgrove
Bangladesh	Aftab Ahmed; Mohammad Ashraful; Nafees Iqbal; Talha Jubair; Mashrafe Mortaza
Canada	Ashish Bagai; Umar Bhatti
England	Tim Bresnan; Nick Compton; Samit Patel
India	Parthiv Patel; Irfan Pathan; Stuart Binny; Suresh Raina
Kenya	Hiren Varaiya; Rajesh Bhudia; Nehemiah Odhiambo; Alfred Luseno; Ragheb Aga; Morris Ouma; Kalpesh Patel
Namibia	Stephan Swanepoel; Burton van Rooi
Nepal	Basanta Regmi; Kanishka Chaugai; Manoj Katuwal; Manjeet Shrestha; Sanjam Regmi; Shakti Gauchan
New Zealand†	Ross Taylor; Michael Bates; Neil Broom; Rob Nicol; Jesse Ryder
Papua New Guinea	Mahuru Dai
Pakistan	Salman Butt; Junaid Zia; Azhar Ali; Najaf Shah; Faisal Iqbal; Hasan Raza; Yasir Arafat; Irfan Fazil; Humayun Farhat; Mohammad Khalil; Umar Gul
Scotland	Kyle Coetzer; Moneeb Iqbal
South Africa	Hashim Amla; Ryan McLaren; Rory Kleinveldt; Stephen Cook; Imraan Khan
Sri Lanka	Jeewan Mendis; Upul Tharanga; Dhammika Prasad; Farveez Maharoof
West Indies	Dwayne Bravo; Ravi Rampaul; Darren Sammy; Narsingh Deonarine; Gavin Tonge; Donovan Pagon; Shane Shillingford; Lendl Simmons
Zimbabwe	Elton Chigumbura; Charles Coventry; Stuart Matsikenyeri; Brendan Taylor; Waddington Mwayenga; Tatenda Taibu; Sean Ervine; Hamilton Masakadza
† Peter Borren also represented New Zealand but went on to play international cricket for Netherlands.
