= Michael Durant (cricketer) =

South African-born Namibian cricketer

Personal information
- Full name: Michael Durant
- Born: 12 February 1983 (age 43); Springbok, Cape Province, South Africa
- Batting: Right-handed
- Bowling: Right-arm off break

Domestic team information
- Years: Team
- 2007/08: Namibia

Career statistics
| Competition | First-class | List A |
|---|---|---|
| Matches | 7 | 6 |
| Runs scored | 127 | 42 |
| Batting average | 11.54 | 7.00 |
| 100s/50s | –/– | –/– |
| Top score | 28 | 12 |
| Balls bowled | 600 | 138 |
| Wickets | 7 | 2 |
| Bowling average | 49.28 | 68.50 |
| 5 wickets in innings | – | – |
| 10 wickets in match | – | – |
| Best bowling | 2/51 | 1/32 |
| Catches/stumpings | 4/– | 3/– |
- Source: CricketArchive (subscription required), 16 October 2011

Michael Durant (born 12 February 1983) is a South African-born Namibian cricketer. He was a right-handed batsman and a right-arm offbreak bowler. He was a part of the Namibian cricket team at the 2002 Under-19 Cricket World Cup.

He later represented Namibia during a tour of Zimbabwe in 2004, appearing as a tailend batsman. Durandt made his first-class debut against North West in October 2007.
