= Kenya national under-19 cricket team =

The Flag of Kenya.

The Kenya national under-19 cricket team represents the Republic of Kenya in international under-19 cricket. Kenya has qualified for the ICC Under-19 World Cup on four occasions – 1998, 2000, 2002, and 2018. Overall, Kenya has won 26% (6 out of 23) of its World Cup matches, with a best performance of 11th place in 1998.

== Under-19 World Cup record ==
Kenya's U19 World Cup record
Year	Result	Pos	№	Pld	W	L	T	NR
(Australia) 1988	Did not enter							
(South Africa) 1998	First round	11th	16	6	3	3	0	0
(Sri Lanka) 2000	First round	13th	16	6	1	4	0	1
(New Zealand) 2002	First round	14th	16	6	1	5	0	0
(Bangladesh) 2004	Did not qualify							
(Sri Lanka) 2006	Did not qualify							
(Malaysia) 2008	Did not qualify							
(New Zealand) 2010	Did not qualify							
(Australia) 2012	Did not qualify							
(United Arab Emirates) 2014	Did not qualify							
(Bangladesh) 2016	Did not qualify							
(New Zealand) 2018	First round	15th	16	6	1	5	0	0
(South Africa) 2020	Did not qualify							
Total				24	6	17	0	1

== Tournament history ==
=== 1998 ===
At the 1998 World Cup in South Africa, Kenya defeated only Scotland in the group stage. In the plate competition, they won two more games against Ireland and Papua New Guinea to finish 11th overall.

=== 2000 ===
At the 2000 World Cup in Sri Lanka, Kenya finished last in its group. They lost to Pakistan and newcomers Nepal, and the game against South Africa was abandoned. In the plate competition, they won their only game of the tournament, against Namibia, and thus finished 13th overall.

=== 2002 ===
At the 2002 World Cup in New Zealand, Kenya again finished last in its group. The opening match against Australia was one of the most shameful days in Kenya cricket history. Australia racked up 480/6 from its 50 overs, the highest total in World Cup history. Kenya was dismissed for 50 runs, to lose by a whopping 430 runs, another shameful record. Despite this however, Kenya did not finish last at the tournament, as they defeated Papua New Guinea in the plate championship to secure 14th overall.

=== 2018 ===
In conjunction with the decline in fortunes of the Kenyan senior team, the national under-19 team failed to qualify for the World Cup for seven consecutive tournaments between 2004 and 2016. But in a stunning turnaround, the Kenyans won the 2017 ICC Under-19 World Cup Qualifier – Africa on home soil, defeating Uganda on net run rate. In the final game of the tournament, needing a large victory to qualify, Kenya dismissed Uganda for just 60 runs and romped to a 7-wicket victory in just 8.3 overs.
