= Namibia national under-19 cricket team =

Namibia Under-19s
- Association: Namibia Cricket Board

Personnel
- Captain: Zane Green
- Coach: Norbert Manyande

International Cricket Council
- ICC region: ICC Africa

International cricket
- First international: Namibia vs. West Indies (Windhoek; January 1998)
- As of 14 February 2016

The Namibia national under-19 cricket team represents Namibia in under-19 international cricket. Namibia has won the ICC Africa Under-19 Championships a record number of times.

Namibia has qualified for the Under-19 World Cup on eight occasions, more than any other associate member of the International Cricket Council (ICC). The team's best performance was at the 2016 Under-19 World Cup in Bangladesh, where it defeated defending champions South Africa in the group stage and eventually placed seventh, equaling Afghanistan's performance at the 2014 event as the best by an associate. By finishing as the best-ranked associate team at the 2016 World Cup, Namibia secured automatic qualification for the 2018 World Cup in New Zealand.

== Current squad ==
Namibia's squad at the 2016 Under-19 World Cup was as follows:

Coach: (Zimbabwe) Rangarirai Manyande

Player	Date of Birth	Batting	Bowling style
Zane Green (c, wk)	11 October 1996 (aged 19)	Left	—
Charl Brits	22 July 1998 (aged 17)	Right	Right-arm off spin
Petrus Burger	3 November 1999 (aged 16)	Right	Right-arm leg spin
Fritz Coetzee	4 June 1997 (aged 18)	Right	Left-arm fast-medium
Niko Davin	19 December 1997 (aged 18)	Right	Right-arm leg spin
Motjaritje Honga	8 April 1997 (aged 18)	Right	Right-arm medium
Burton Jacobs	17 April 1997 (aged 18)	Right	Right-arm medium
Jürgen Linde	11 February 1999 (aged 16)	Left	Left-arm medium
SJ Loftie-Eaton	11 October 1996 (aged 19)	Right	Right-arm fast-medium
Lo-handre Louwrens (wk)	24 April 1999 (aged 16)	Right	—
Chrischen Olivier	13 March 1998 (aged 17)	Right	Right-arm medium-fast
Francois Rautenbach	17 October 1997 (aged 18)	Right	Right-arm off spin
Michael van Lingen	24 October 1997 (aged 18)	Left	—
Eben van Wyk	19 March 1999 (aged 16)	Right	Right-arm medium
Warren van Wyk	20 November 1997 (aged 18)	Left	Right-arm medium-fast

== List of captains ==
As of 2016, nine cricketers have captained Namibia in under-19 One Day International (ODI) matches.

No.	Name	First	Last	M	W	L	T	NR	Win%
1	Duane Vilijoen	1998	1998	5	0	5	0	0	0.00
2	Jan-Berrie Burger	2000	2000	6	0	5	1	0	8.33
3	Stephan Swanepoel	2002	2002	7	3	4	0	0	42.86
4	Stephanus Ackermann	2006	2006	5	1	4	0	0	20.00
5	Dawid Botha	2008	2008	4	1	3	0	0	25.00
6	Louis van der Westhuizen	2008	2008	1	0	1	0	0	0.00
7	Stephan Baard	2012	2012	6	0	6	0	0	0.00
8	Gerhard Erasmus	2014	2014	6	1	5	0	0	20.00
9	Zane Green	2016	2016	6	3	3	0	0	50.00
Overall				46	9	36	1	0	19.57

== Records ==
All records listed are for under-19 One Day International (ODI) matches only, and are correct as of the 2016 U-19 World Cup

=== Team records ===
Highest totals

- 263/9 (50 overs), v. Canada, at ICC Academy Ground, Dubai, 24 February 2014
- 237/6 (43.3 overs), v. Scotland, at Eden Park, Auckland, 28 January 2002
- 231/5 (50 overs), v. Zimbabwe, at Galle International Stadium, Galle, 21 January 2000

Lowest totals

- 55 (30.4 overs), v. Australia, at P. Sara Stadium, Colombo, 11 January 2000
- 57 (28.3 overs), v. Bangladesh, Uyanwatte Stadium, Matara, 19 January 2000
- 65 (32.5 overs), v. Bangladesh, Cox's Bazar Cricket Stadium, Cox's Bazar, 2 February 2016

=== Individual records ===
Most career runs

- 435 – Stephan Swanepoel (from 19 matches between 1998 and 2002, at an average of 24.16)
- 311 – Dawid Botha (from 9 matches between 2006 and 2008, at an average of 44.42)
- 297 – Gerhard Erasmus (from 11 matches between 2012 and 2014, at an average of 29.70)

Highest individual scores

- 142 (131 balls) – Stephan Swanepoel, v. Scotland, at Eden Park, Auckland, 28 January 2002
- 84 (119 balls) – Gerhard Erasmus, v. Afghanistan, at Sheikh Zayed Stadium, Abu Dhabi, 19 February 2014
- 78 (116 balls) – Xander Pitchers, v. Zimbabwe, at Sheikh Zayed Stadium, Abu Dhabi, 22 February 2014

Most career wickets

- 20 – Burton van Rooi (from 13 matches between 2000 and 2002, at an average of 19.80)
- 17 – Bredell Wessels (from 9 matches between 2012 and 2014, at an average of 22.58)
- 15 – Fritz Coetzee (from 6 matches in 2016, at an average of 15.93)

Best bowling performances

- 5/29 (10 overs) – Rudi Scholtz, v. England, at NF Oppenheimer Ground, Johannesburg, 13 January 1998
- 4/24 (6.2 overs) – Michael van Lingen, v. Nepal, at Khan Shaheb Osman Ali Stadium, Fatullah, 11 February 2016
- 4/24 (10 overs) – Michael van Lingen, v. South Africa, at Cox's Bazar Cricket Stadium, Cox's Bazar, 31 January 2016
