= ICC U19 Cricket World Cup Europe Qualifier =

- Administrator: International Cricket Council
- Format: Youth ODI
- First edition: 1999
- Latest edition: 2025
- Tournament format: Round-robin
- Number of teams: 15 (from 2011)
- Current champion: Scotland
- Most successful: Scotland (10 titles)
- 2028 Under-19 Cricket World Cup qualification

ICC U19 Cricket World Cup Europe Qualifier (formerly ICC Europe Under-19 Championships) are a series of regular cricket tournaments organised by the International Cricket Council (ICC) as the European qualifier for the Under-19 Cricket World Cup. The tournament was originally organised by the European Cricket Council (ECC). Traditionally there have always been two divisions though the nature of these divisions has varied strongly over the years.

== History ==
The first edition of the tournament was played in 1999 in Northern Ireland. The teams were split across two divisions, the more developed cricketing nations of Ireland, Scotland, Netherlands and Denmark joining England in the A Championship and three other associates, Gibraltar, Italy and Germany forming the B Championship. England won the tournament easily and would not participate again.

Following this inaugural competition, the higher, eventually referred to as Division One, was played every year between Ireland, Scotland, Netherlands and Denmark. Every other year, the Division Two tournament was also played alongside. In 2003, France debuted in the second division, later joined by Belgium and Israel in 2005 and by Jersey, Guernsey and the Isle of Man in 2007.

In 2003, a different approach was taken with all the teams across both divisions participating in a preliminary qualification round. However, this did not affect the make-up of the divisions whatsoever as the four more developed nations easily overpowered the others and cemented their position in Division One. After this the system was abandoned and the old format was reintroduced the following year.

A fresh initiative for the 2006 edition was a new two-day format for Division One. The aim of this was to provide the players with some practice for the style of multi-day play encountered in the Intercontinental Cup. The one-day format returned the following year.

2007 saw the two divisions being played separately for the first time when Division One was located in Ireland, but the nine-team Division Two was played in Jersey. This was Jersey's first ever European cricket competition.

Another change was made to the division format in 2009 when Jersey and Guernsey were relocated into Division One. This evened out the number of teams across the divisions and a win from Jersey over Denmark demonstrated their ability to play in the top flight. As a result, the two teams remained for the 2010 tournament where both teams performed even better than the previous year.

Plans have been unveiled that in 2011, for the first time, there will be a chance of promotion from Division Two. The total number of participants will also be increased from thirteen to fifteen.

== Tournament results ==
=== Division One ===
Year	Host(s)	Venue(s)	Result		
Year	Host(s)	Venue(s)	Winner	Margin	Runner-up
1999	Northern Ireland	Belfast	England; 185/5 (43.2 overs)	England won by 5 wickets (needed 184 in 48 overs) scorecard	Ireland; 190/8 (50 overs)
2000	England	Northampton	Ireland; 6 points	Ireland won on points table	Netherlands; 2 points
2001	Scotland	Edinburgh	Scotland; 6 points	Scotland won on points table	Ireland; 4 points
2002	England	Oundle	Scotland; 6 points	Scotland won on points table	Denmark; 4 points
2003	Netherlands	Deventer	Ireland; 6 points	Ireland won on points table	Scotland; 2 points
2004	England	Oundle	Ireland; 4 points	Ireland and Scotland drew on points table	Scotland; 4 points
2005	Scotland	Dundee	Scotland; 6 points	Scotland won on points table	Ireland; 4 points
2006	Northern Ireland	Belfast	Ireland; 59 points	Ireland won on points table	Scotland; 37 points
2007	Northern Ireland	Belfast	Ireland; 6 points	Ireland won on points table	Scotland; 4 points
2008	Scotland	Glasgow	Scotland +3.49 NRR	Scotland won on net run rate table	Ireland +1.22 NRR
2009	Jersey	various	Ireland +1.69 NRR	Ireland won on net run rate table	Netherlands +1.45 NRR
2010	Northern Ireland	Belfast	Scotland; 10 points	Scotland won on points table	Ireland; 8 points
2013	Netherlands	various	Scotland; 10 points	Scotland won on points table	Ireland; 6 points
2015	Jersey	various	Scotland +1.036 NRR	Scotland won on net run rate table	Ireland +0.793 NRR
2017	Jersey	various	Ireland; 12 points	Ireland won on points table	Scotland; 8 points
2019	Netherlands	various	Scotland; 10 points	Scotland won on points table	Ireland; 8 points
2021	Spain	Almería	Ireland; 144	Ireland won by 78 runs scorecard	Scotland; 66
2023	Netherlands	various	Scotland; 9 points	Scotland won on points table	Guernsey; 5 points
2025	Scotland; 10 points	various	Scotland; 144	Scotland won on points table	Netherlands; 8 points

=== Division Two ===
Year	Host	Venue(s)	Final		
Year	Host	Venue(s)	Winner	Result	Runner-up
1999	Northern Ireland	Belfast	Gibraltar; 7 points	Gibraltar won on points table	Italy; 5 points
2001	Scotland	Edinburgh	Germany; 6 points	Germany won on points table	Italy; 4 points
2003	Netherlands	Deventer	Germany; 6 points	Germany won on points table	Italy; 4 points
2005	Scotland	Dundee	Gibraltar; 10 points	Gibraltar won on points table	Israel; 8 points
2007	Jersey	various	Jersey; 4 points	Jersey won on points table	Guernsey; 2 points
2009	Belgium	Antwerp	Belgium +1.71 (NRR)	Belgium won on net run rate table	Isle of Man +1.67 (NRR)
2011	Isle of Man	various	Denmark; 140 (39 overs)	Denmark won by 60 runs scorecard	Isle of Man; 80 (34.2 overs)
2014	England	Essex	Jersey +3.29 (NRR)	Jersey won on net run rate table	Netherlands +2.69 (NRR)
2016	Netherlands	various	Denmark; 12 points	Denmark won on points table	Netherlands; 6 points
2018	England	various	Netherlands; 281/6 (50 overs)	Netherlands won by 154 runs scorecard	France; 127 (40.5 overs)
2022	Guernsey	various	Italy; 170/4 (38 overs)	Italy won by 6 wickets scorecard	Guernsey; 169 (47 overs)
2024	Denmark	various	Netherlands; 87/6 (23 overs)	Netherlands won by 4 wickets scorecard	Sweden; 86 (32.5 overs)

== Participating teams (Division One) ==
Legend

- 1st – Champions
- 2nd – Runners-up
- 3rd – Third place
- – Hosts
- AQ – Automatically qualified for the World Cup
- X – Qualified but withdrew

Team	(Northern Ireland) 1999	(England) 2000	(Scotland) 2001	(England) 2002	(Netherlands) 2003	(England) 2004	(Scotland) 2005	(Northern Ireland) 2006	(Northern Ireland) 2007	(Scotland) 2008	(Jersey) 2009	(Northern Ireland) 2010	(Netherlands) 2013	(Jersey) 2015	(Jersey) 2017	(Netherlands) 2019	(Spain) 2021	(Netherlands) 2023	(Scotland) 2025	2027	Total
Denmark	6th	3rd	4th	2nd	3rd	4th	4th	4th	4th	4th	5th	6th	5th	―	4th	5th	X	―	4th	Q	17
England	1st	Automatically qualified																			1
France	—	—	—	―	—	—	—	—	―	―	―	―	―	―	―	6th	―	―	―	―	1
Guernsey	―	―	―	―	―	―	―	―	―	―	6th	5th	6th	―	―	―	X	2nd	5th	―	5
Ireland	2nd	1st	2nd	3rd	1st	1st	2nd	1st	1st	2nd	1st	2nd	2nd	2nd	1st	2nd	1st	AQ			17
Italy	—	—	—	―	—	—	—	—	―	―	―	―	―	―	―	―	―	6th	―	Q	2
Jersey	—	―	―	―	―	―	―	―	―	―	4th	3rd	4th	3rd	3rd	3rd	4th	3rd	3rd	Q	10
Netherlands	3rd	2nd	3rd	4th	4th	3rd	3rd	3rd	2nd	3rd	2nd	4th	3rd	4th	―	4th	3rd	4th	2nd	Q	19
Norway	—	—	—	―	—	—	—	—	―	―	―	―	―	―	―	―	―	5th	―	—	1
Scotland	4th	4th	1st	1st	2nd	2nd	1st	2nd	2nd	1st	3rd	1st	1st	1st	2nd	1st	2nd	1st	1st	Q	20
Sweden	—	—	—	―	—	—	—	—	―	―	―	―	―	―	―	―	―	―	6th	Q	2

== See also ==
- ICC U19 Cricket World Cup Asia Qualifier
- European Cricket Championship
