= 2028 Under-19 Cricket World Cup qualification =

Cricket qualification tournaments

2028 ICC Under-19 Cricket World Cup qualification
- Dates: 24 July 2026 – 2027
- Administrators: International Cricket Council; ICC Africa; ICC Asia; ICC Americas; ICC East Asia-Pacific; ICC Europe
- Cricket format: 50 Over U19/Y-ODI

The 2028 Under-19 Cricket World Cup qualification is a series of regional cricket qualification tournaments to determine the teams for the 2028 Under-19 Men's Cricket World Cup.

== Qualified teams ==
Region	Team
Africa	TBD
Americas	TBD
Asia	TBD
East Asia-Pacific	TBD
Europe	TBD

== Africa ==
The Africa Qualifier is divided into two divisions, with Division 2 played between 9 and 16 August 2026 in Rwanda, and the top three teams will advanced to Division 1.

Division 2	Division 1
Ghana; Mozambique; Nigeria; Rwanda; Sierra Leone; Uganda	Kenya; Namibia; Nigeria; Rwanda; Tanzania; Uganda

=== Africa - Division 2 ===
==== Points table ====
Pos	Team	Pld	W	L	Pts	NRR	Qualification
1	Uganda	5	5	0	10	3.550	Advanced to Division 1
2	Nigeria	5	4	1	8	3.703	Advanced to Division 1
3	Rwanda	5	3	2	6	0.761	Advanced to Division 1
4	Ghana	5	2	3	4	−0.216	Eliminated
5	Sierra Leone	5	1	4	2	−1.279	Eliminated
6	Mozambique	5	0	5	0	−7.126	Eliminated

Source: CricHeroes

Fixtures

9 August 2026
09:30
Scorecard

Rwanda; 411/5 (50 overs)	v	Mozambique; 89 (27.2 runs)
Nziza Jasper 84 (61); Manuel Mbebe Jr 2/78 (10 overs)		Charles Mbebe 24 (32); Patrick Iradukunda 3/15 (6 overs)

Rwanda won by 322 runs
Gahanga International Cricket Stadium, Kigali
Player of the match: Elise Gihozo (Rwa)

- Rwanda won the toss and elected to bat.

9 August 2026
09:30
Scorecard

Nigeria; 176 (45 overs)	v	Uganda; 178/5 (38.2 overs)
Kenneth Boniface 97 (107); Itagi Larry 3/18 (9 overs)		Samuel Ahaisibwe 72 (90); Pelumi Orimolade 2/24 (5 overs)

Uganda won by 5 wickets
Gahanga B Ground, Kigali
Umpires: Gasana Christian (Rwa) and Percival Sizara (Zim)
Player of the match: Felix Ochan (Uga)

- Uganda won the toss and elected to field.

9 August 2026
09:30
Scorecard

Ghana; 265 (49 overs)	v	Sierra Leone; 135 (43 overs)
David Ateak 71 (82); Dennis James 4/30 (9 overs)		Aliya Kamara 37 (53); Stanley Carson 5/28 (10 overs)

Ghana won by 130 runs
IPRC Cricket Ground, Kigali
Umpires: Forster Mutizwa (Zim) and Claus Schumacher (Nam)
Player of the match: Stanley Carson (Gha)

- Sierra Leone won the toss and elected to field.

10 August 2026
09:30
Scorecard

Ghana; 93 (39.5 overs)	v	Nigeria; 96/5 (22.2 overs)
David Ateak 26 (26); Kenneth Boniface 4/33 (8 overs)		Kenneth Boniface 30* (32); Prince Adotei 2/8 (2 overs)

Nigeria won by 5 wickets
Gahanga International Cricket Stadium, Kigali
Umpires: Patric Makumbi (Uga) and Percival Sizara (Zim)
Player of the match: Kenneth Boniface (Nga)

- Ghana won the toss and elected to bat.

10 August 2026
09:30
Scorecard

Uganda; 410/6 (50 overs)	v	Mozambique; 26 (25.5 overs)
Robert Owilli 132 (96); Charles Mbebe 2/69 (10 overs)		Manuel Mbebe Jr 8 (23); Richard Sohera 4/1 (6 overs)

Uganda won by 384 runs
Gahanga B Ground, Kigali
Umpires: Isaac Oyieko (Ken) and Claus Schumacher (Nam)
Player of the match: Richard Sohera (Uga)

- Uganda won the toss and elected to bat.

10 August 2026
09:30
Scorecard

Rwanda; 302 (48.5 overs)	v	Sierra Leone; 253 (50 overs)
Nziza Jasper 51 (43); Aliya Kamara 3/38 (8 overs)		Ibrahim Bangura 102* (106); Eric Hagenimana 3/44 (10 overs)

Rwanda won by 49 runs
IPRC Cricket Ground, Kigali
Umpires: Olumide Akintokun (Nga) and Acacio Chitsondzo (Moz)
Player of the match: Eric Hagenimana (Rwa)

- Rwanda won the toss and elected to bat.

12 August 2026
09:30
Scorecard

Rwanda; 79 (23.1 overs)	v	Nigeria; 84/3 (15.2 overs)
Fabrice Kwizera 12 (32); Emmanuel Oladejo 3/9 (5 overs)		Ali Rahmon 24 (38); Elise Gihozo 2/13 (2.2 overs)

Nigeria won by 7 wickets
Gahanga International Cricket Stadium, Kigali
Umpires: Acacio Chitsondzo (Moz) and David Odhiambo (Ken)
Player of the match: Kenneth Boniface (Nga)

- Rwanda won the toss and elected to bat.

12 August 2026
09:30
Scorecard

Mozambique; 89 (23.5 overs)	v	Sierra Leone; 93/2 (13 overs)
Aulino Banze 25 (29); Aliya Kamara 5/21 (6.5 overs)		Aliya Kamara 52 (47); Emerson Ndzeute 1/6 (1 over)

Sierra Leone won by 8 wickets
Gahanga B Ground, Kigali
Umpires: Olumide Akintokun (Nga) and Claus Schumacher (Nam)
Player of the match: Aliya Kamara (Sle)

- Mozambique won the toss and elected to bat.

12 August 2026
09:30
Scorecard

Uganda; 270/8 (50 overs)	v	Ghana; 95 (41.5 overs)
Abraiz Ali 107 (131); Lee Nyarko 3/46 (10 overs)		Jacob Ayolehene 26 (71); Asiku Johnson 3/28 (10 overs)

Uganda won by 175 runs
IPRC Cricket Ground, Kigali
Umpires: Gasana Christian (Rwa) and Isaac Oyieko (Ken)
Player of the match: Richard Sohera (Uga)

- Uganda won the toss and elected to bat.

13 August 2026
09:30
Scorecard

Uganda; 152 (45.3 overs)	v	Sierra Leone; 54 (28.4 overs)
Owilli Robert 53 (83); Dennis James 3/35 (10 overs)		Charles Kamara 26 (67); Hamidu Munigwa 3/6 (7.4 overs)

Uganda won by 98 runs
Gahanga International Cricket Stadium, Kigali
Umpires: Olumide Akintokun (Nga) and David Odhiambo (Ken)
Player of the match: Richard Sohera (Uga)

- Uganda won the toss and elected to bat.

13 August 2026
09:30
Scorecard

Rwanda; 136 (33.3 overs)	v	Ghana; 93 (30.4 overs)
Kwizera Oneseme 38 (54); Stanley Carson 4/33 (9 overs)		Jacob Ayolehene 28 (40); Elise Gihozo 4/28 (10 overs)

Rwanda won by 43 runs
Gahanga B Ground, Kigali
Umpires: Acacio Chitsondzo (Moz) and Percival Sizara (Zim)
Player of the match: Elise Gihozo (Rwa)

- Rwanda won the toss and elected to bat.

13 August 2026
09:30
Scorecard

Nigeria; 462/6 (50 overs)	v	Mozambique; 54 (23 overs)
Bright Edem 137* (53); Fabiao Novel 2/104 (10 overs)		Rodrigues Mangue 19 (13); Peculiar Egamasi 3/1 (1 over)

Nigeria won by 407 runs
IPRC Cricket Ground, Kigali
Umpires: Forster Mutizwa (Zim) and Isaac Oyieko (Ken)
Player of the match: Peculiar Egamasi (Nga)

- Nigeria won the toss and elected to bat.

15 August 2026
09:30
Scorecard

Rwanda; 89 (28.4 overs)	v	Uganda; 90/4 (18.5 overs)
Fabrice Kwizera 26 (60); Asiku Jackson 4/23 (9 overs)		Devansh Patel 27 (30); Jean Paul Rukundo 2/23 (5 overs)

Uganda won by 6 wickets
Gahanga International Cricket Stadium, Kigali
Umpires: Olumide Akintokun (Nga) and Forster Mutizwa (Zim)
Player of the match: Asiku Jackson (Uga)

- Uganda won the toss and elected to field.

15 August 2026
09:30
Scorecard

Nigeria; 311/9 (50 overs)	v	Sierra Leone; 146 (45.5 overs)
Kenneth Boniface 100* (74); Aliya Kamara 3/65 (10 overs)		Sahr Lebbie 41 (80); Pelumi Orimolade 3/15 (5 overs)

Nigeria won by 165 runs
Gahanga B Ground, Kigali
Umpires: Gasana Christian (Rwa) and Patrick Makumbi (Uga)
Player of the match: Kenneth Boniface (Nga)

- Nigeria won the toss and elected to bat.

15 August 2026
09:30
Scorecard

Mozambique; 56 (17.4 overs)	v	Ghana; 57/0 (7.5 overs)
Quelido Uqueio 20 (15); Lee Nyarko 4/13 (4.4 overs)		Jacob Ayolehene 28* (24)

Ghana won by 10 wickets
IPRC Cricket Ground, Kigali
Umpires: Claus Schumacher (Nam) and Percival Sizara (Zim)
Player of the match: Stanley Carson (Gha)

- Mozambique won the toss and elected to bat.

== East Asia-Pacific ==
The East Asia-Pacific Qualifier is divided into two divisions, with Division 2 played between 8 and 12 September 2026 in Vanuatu, and the winner will advance to Division 1.

Division 2	Division 1
Indonesia; Papua New Guinea; Samoa; Vanuatu	Fiji; Japan; Papua New Guinea

=== East Asia-Pacific - Division 2 ===
Pos	Team	Pld	W	L	Pts	NRR	Qualification
1	Papua New Guinea	3	3	0	6	4.789	Advanced to the Final
2	Samoa	3	2	1	4	−1.410	Advanced to the Final
3	Vanuatu	3	1	2	2	−1.013	Advanced to the Play-off
4	Indonesia	3	0	3	0	−1.627	Advanced to the Play-off

Source: CricClubs

Fixtures

8 September 2026
09:00
Scorecard

Vanuatu; 108 (26.5 overs)	v	Indonesia; 83 (21.1 overs)
Phillise Tastuki 37 (26); Juan Alveron 6/50 (8 overs)		Kavin Chaddha 16 (20); Gregory Wotu 5/51 (10 overs)

Vanuatu won by 25 runs
Vanuatu Cricket Ground, Port Vila
Umpires: Koita Atai (PNG) and Cory Black (NZ)
Player of the match: Juan Alveron (Idn)

- Vanuatu won the toss and elected to bat.

8 September 2026
09:00
Scorecard

Papua New Guinea; 357/8 (50 overs)	v	Samoa; 72 (18.4 overs)
Vahu Karuka 87 (80); Arthur Gabriel 3/97 (10 overs)		Joshua Mcnaughton 27 (40); Immanuel Ravusiro 6/20 (4.4 overs)

Papua New Guinea won by 285 runs
Vanuatu Cricket Ground (Oval 2), Port Vila
Umpires: Merielle Kenni (Van) and Claire Polosak (Aus)
Player of the match: Immanuel Ravusiro (PNG)

- Papua New Guinea won the toss and elected to bat.

9 September 2026
09:00
Scorecard

Vanuatu; 106 (30.4 overs)	v	Samoa; 107/6 (30.5 overs)
Surya Lekai 24 (50); Joshua Mcnaughton 4/17 (7.4 overs)		Joshua Mcnaughton 31* (60); Surya Lekai 2/24 (9.5 overs)

Samoa won by 4 wickets
Vanuatu Cricket Ground, Port Vila
Umpires: Koita Atai (PNG) and Cory Black (NZ)
Player of the match: Joshua Mcnaughton (Sam)

- Vanuatu won the toss and elected to bat.

9 September 2026
09:00
Scorecard

Papua New Guinea; 298/9 (50 overs)	v	Indonesia; 99 (29 overs)
Immanuel Ravusiro 73 (82); Juan Alveron 4/55 (9 overs)		Divit Nanda 25 (34); Ware Wala 6/12 (6 overs)

Papua New Guinea won by 199 runs
Vanuatu Cricket Ground (Oval 2), Port Vila
Umpires: Claire Polosak (Aus) and Kalala Tanuvasa (Sam)
Player of the match: Ware Wala (PNG)

- Papua New Guinea won the toss and elected to bat.

11 September 2026
09:00
Scorecard

Samoa; 173/9 (50 overs)	v	Indonesia; 153 (43.3 overs)
Misiperetiso Tulasi 28 (61); Kavin Chaddha 3/23 (10 overs)		Divit Nanda 52 (64); Cohen Faitaua 3/27 (8 overs)

Samoa won by 20 runs
Vanuatu Cricket Ground (Oval 2), Port Vila
Umpires: Koita Atai (PNG) and Merielle Kenni (Van)
Player of the match: Cohen Faitaua (Sam)

- Samoa won the toss and elected to bat.

11 September 2026
09:00
Scorecard

Vanuatu; 120 (39.3 overs)	v	Papua New Guinea; 121/2 (15.1 overs)
Killion Masauvakalo 27 (26); Ware Wala 4/10 (9.3 overs)		Vagi Morea 49 (37); Jamie Firiam 1/14 (1 over)

Papua New Guinea won by 8 wickets
Vanuatu Cricket Ground, Port Vila
Player of the match: Ware Wala (PNG)

- Papua New Guinea won the toss and elected to field.

==== Play-off & Final ====
Final
1	Papua New Guinea	211 (41.1 overs)
2	Samoa	67 (23 overs)
3rd place Play-off
3	Vanuatu	225 (48 overs)
4	Indonesia	228/6 (39.3 overs)

Fixtures

3rd place Play-off
12 September 2026
09:00
Scorecard

Vanuatu; 225 (48 overs)	v	Indonesia; 228/6 (39.3 overs)
Surya Lekai 90 (104); Kadek Mahayana 6/27 (7 overs)		Kavin Chaddha 92* (101); Surya Lekai 4/56 (9 overs)

Indonesia won by 4 wickets
Vanuatu Cricket Ground (Oval 2), Port Vila
Umpires: Cory Black (NZ) and Kalala Tanuvasa (Sam)
Player of the match: Surya Lekai (Van)

- Vanuatu won the toss and elected to bat.

Final
12 September 2026
09:00
Scorecard

Papua New Guinea; 211 (41.1 overs)	v	Samoa; 67 (23 overs)
Vagi Morea 61 (68); Arthur Gabriel 6/38 (10 overs)		Cohen Faitaua 28 (34); Puka Raho 2/6 (5 overs)

Papua New Guinea won by 144 runs
Vanuatu Cricket Ground, Port Vila
Player of the match: Arthur Gabriel (Sam)

- Papua New Guinea won the toss and elected to bat.

=== East Asia-Pacific - Division 1 ===
Pos	Team	Pld	W	L	NR	Pts	NRR
1	Fiji	0	0	0	0	0	—
2	Japan	0	0	0	0	0	—
3	Papua New Guinea	0	0	0	0	0	—

First match(es) will be played: TBD 2027. Source:

== Europe ==
The Europe Qualifier was divided into two divisions, with Division 2 held between 24 to 30 July 2026 in Guernsey, and the top two teams advanced to Division 1.

Division 2		Division 1
Group A	Group B	Division 1
Belgium; France; Germany; Guernsey	Isle of Man; Italy; Sweden; Switzerland	Denmark; Italy; Jersey; Netherlands; Scotland; Sweden

=== Europe - Division 2 ===
==== Group A ====
Pos	Team	Pld	W	L	Pts	NRR	Qualification
1	Guernsey	3	3	0	6	1.661	Advanced to the Semi-finals
2	Germany	3	1	2	2	−0.202	Advanced to the Semi-finals
3	France	3	1	2	2	−0.542	Advanced to the Play-offs
4	Belgium	3	1	2	2	−0.823	Advanced to the Play-offs

Source: CricClubs

Fixtures

24 July 2026
11:00
Scorecard

Belgium; 141 (41.5 overs)	v	Guernsey; 142/2 (23.2 overs)
Zia Mamond 22 (49); Ed Robinson 4/30 (7.5 overs)		Ed Robinson 83 (78); Christopher Weinel 1/31 (5 overs)

Guernsey won by 8 wickets
Guernsey Rovers Athletic Club Ground, Port Soif
Umpires: Graham Lloyd (Eng) and Srinidhi Ravindra (Fin)
Player of the match: Ed Robinson (Gue)

- Belgium won the toss and elected to bat.

24 July 2026
11:00
Scorecard

France; 123 (35.3 overs)	v	Germany; 93 (23 overs)
Ayon Chanda 35 (32); Fredrick Tucker 3/27 (8 overs)		Rishi Kumar 25 (21); Ayon Chanda 5/24 (8 overs)

France won by 30 runs
College Field, Saint Peter Port
Umpires: Sunil Chandiramani (Gib) and Johnny Kennedy (Ire)
Player of the match: Ayon Chanda (Fra)

- France won the toss and elected to bat.

25 July 2026
11:00
Scorecard

Guernsey; 207 (42.5 overs)	v	France; 141 (47.1 overs)
Evan Le Huray 59 (76); Navine Sureshan 3/38 (10 overs)		Abraham Bouvyer 40 (81); Freddie Forshaw 5/14 (10 overs)

Guernsey won by 66 runs
King George V Sports Ground, Castel
Umpires: Mark Jameson (Ger) and Srinidhi Ravindra (Fin)
Player of the match: Freddie Forshaw (Gue)

- Guernsey won the toss and elected to bat.

25 July 2026
11:00
Scorecard

Germany; 252 (46.5 overs)	v	Belgium; 209/9 (50 overs)
Jonty Ryan 79 (102); Christopher Weinel 4/43 (10 overs)		Akshat Tripathi 32 (56); Prajen Kavinkumar 4/39 (10 overs)

Germany won by 43 runs
Memorial Field, Saint Peter Port
Umpires: Heath Kearns (Jer) and Russell Warren (Eng)
Player of the match: Jonty Ryan (Bel)

- Germany won the toss and elected to bat.

27 July 2026
11:00
Scorecard

France; 202 (46.1 overs)	v	Belgium; 206/7 (38.4 overs)
Navine Sureshan 81 (105); Tristan Herrington 3/39 (8 overs)		Jay Raval 82* (102); Navine Sureshan 4/44 (10 overs)

Belgium won by 3 wickets
Guernsey Rovers Athletic Club Ground, Port Soif
Umpires: Heath Kearns (Jer) and Johnny Kennedy (Ire)
Player of the match: Jay Raval (Bel)

- France won the toss and elected to bat.

27 July 2026
11:00
Scorecard

Germany; 184 (46.4 overs)	v	Guernsey; 185/6 (38.4 overs)
Josh Tahiliani 38 (38); Ed Robinson 4/39 (6.4 overs)		Freddie Forshaw 62 (79); Yashas Randev 3/31 (8 overs)

Guernsey won by 4 wickets
Memorial Field, Saint Peter Port
Umpires: Sunil Chandiramani (Gib) and Iain McDonald (Sco)
Player of the match: Freddie Forshaw (Gue)

- Germany won the toss and elected to bat.

==== Group B ====
Pos	Team	Pld	W	L	Pts	NRR	Qualification
1	Italy	3	2	1	4	2.690	Advanced to the Semi-finals
2	Sweden	3	2	1	4	2.094	Advanced to the Semi-finals
3	Switzerland	3	2	1	4	0.131	Advanced to the Play-offs
4	Isle of Man	3	0	3	0	−6.215	Advanced to the Play-offs

Source: CricClubs

Fixtures

24 July 2026
11:00
Scorecard

Sweden; 418/8 (50 overs)	v	Isle of Man; 170 (37 overs)
Sayan Sharma 141 (129); Ollie Quinn 3/87 (10 overs)		William Osbourn 40 (96); Parameshwar Marimuthu 4/8 (5 overs)

Sweden won by 248 runs
King George V Sports Ground, Castel
Umpires: Adnan Khan (Esp) and Russell Warren (Eng)
Player of the match: Sayan Sharma (Swe)

- Isle of Man won the toss and elected to field.

24 July 2026
11:00
Scorecard

Switzerland; 265/7 (50 overs)	v	Italy; 243 (48.2 overs)
Kabir Pradhan 104 (143); Jone Ali 2/57 (10 overs)		Niall Basini 60 (73); Aayansh Mehrotra 3/35 (7.2 overs)

Switzerland won by 22 runs
Memorial Field, Saint Peter Port
Umpires: Gareth Morrison (Ire) and Maulik Prabhudesai (Ned)
Player of the match: Kabir Pradhan (Sui)

- Switzerland won the toss and elected to bat.

25 July 2026
11:00
Scorecard

Isle of Man; 71 (21.2 overs)	v	Switzerland; 75/4 (9.4 overs)
Matthew Cope 16* (18); Jayden Saville 5/37 (10 overs)		Kabir Pradhan 35* (28); Ollie Quinn 2/30 (4 overs)

Switzerland won by 6 wickets
Guernsey Rovers Athletic Club Ground, Port Soif
Umpires: George Brolly (Ire) and Sunil Chandiramani (Gib)
Player of the match: Jayden Saville (Sui)

- Isle of Man won the toss and elected to bat.

25 July 2026
11:00
Scorecard

Sweden; 122 (40 overs)	v	Italy; 123/3 (18.3 overs)
Sayan Sharma 30 (57); Jone Ali 4/22 (7 overs)		Gianluca Larucci 64 (51); Amitoj Saini 1/24 (2.3 overs)

Italy won by 7 wickets
College Field, Saint Peter Port
Umpires: Adnan Khan (Esp) and Iain McDonald (Sco)
Player of the match: Gianluca Larucci (Ita)

- Sweden won the toss and elected to bat.

27 July 2026
11:00
Scorecard

Isle of Man; 100 (22.3 overs)	v	Italy; 104/1 (10.4 overs)
Joel Williams 41 (30); Deneth Ashinsana 4/24 (6 overs)		Alex Malwatta 52* (35); Ollie Quinn 1/14 (1 over)

Italy won by 9 wickets
King George V Sports Ground, Castel
Umpires: Gareth Morrison (Ire) and Mark Jameson (Ger)
Player of the match: Alex Malwatta (Ita)

- Italy won the toss and elected to field.

27 July 2026
11:00
Scorecard

Sweden; 312/8 (50 overs)	v	Switzerland; 132 (34 overs)
Muhammad Khattak 171 (128); Aaditya Batla 3/42 (10 overs)		Finn Benson 37 (57); Yaseen Khan 3/26 (5 overs)

Sweden won by 180 runs
College Field, Saint Peter Port
Umpires: George Brolly (Ire) and Graham Lloyd (Eng)
Player of the match: Muhammad Khattak (Swe)

- Sweden won the toss and elected to bat.

=== Knockout stage ===
==== Semi-finals ====
Semi-finals
A1	Guernsey	213 (41.1 overs)
B2	Sweden	251/8 (50 overs)
B1	Italy	159/3 (33.4 overs)
A2	Germany	153 (41.1 overs)

Final
SF1W	Sweden	159 (49.1 overs)
SF2W	Italy	161/1 (33 overs)
3rd-place Playoff
SF1L	Guernsey	305 (45/45 overs)
SF2L	Germany	227 (37.4/45 overs)

==== Play-offs ====
Playoffs
A3	Switzerland	209/4 (39 overs)
B4	Belgium	208 (45.3 overs)
B3	France	232 (47.5 overs)
A4	Isle of Man	257/8 (50 overs)

5th-place Playoff
P1W	Switzerland	340/7 (45 overs)
P2W	Isle of Man	181 (34 overs)
7th-place Playoff
P1L	Belgium	187/4 (27.1 overs)
P2L	France	183 (43.2 overs)

Fixtures

Play-off 1
28 July 2026
11:00
Scorecard

Belgium; 208 (45.3 overs)	v	Switzerland; 209/4 (39 overs)
Zia Mamond 64 (75); Aaditya Batla 3/36 (10 overs)		Waleed Ahmadzai 57 (90); Shaurya Shah 1/14 (6 overs)

Switzerland won by 6 wickets
Memorial Field, Saint Peter Port
Umpires: Gareth Morrison (Ire) and Srinidhi Ravindra (Fin)
Player of the match: Aaditya Batla (Sui)

- Belgium won the toss and elected to bat.

Play-off 2
28 July 2026
11:00
Scorecard

Isle of Man; 257/8 (50 overs)	v	France; 232 (47.5 overs)
Theo Kiernan 50 (101); Jaspreet Singh 3/39 (10 overs)		Ayon Chanda 75 (65); William Osbourn 3/28 (8.5 overs)

Isle of Man won by 25 runs
College Field, Saint Peter Port
Umpires: Johnny Kennedy (Ire) and Russell Warren (Eng)
Player of the match: William Osbourn (Iom)

- Isle of Man won the toss and elected to bat.

Semi-final 1
28 July 2026
11:00
Scorecard

Sweden; 251/8 (50 overs)	v	Guernsey; 213 (41.1 overs)
Muhammad Khattak 75 (78); Barney Groves 3/36 (10 overs)		Ed Robinson 74 (68); Nischith Mokhamatam 5/42 (10 overs)

Sweden won by 38 runs
King George V Sports Ground, Castel
Umpires: Sunil Chandiramani (Gib) and Graham Lloyd (Eng)
Player of the match: Ed Robinson (Gue)

- Sweden won the toss and elected to bat.

Semi-final 2
28 July 2026
11:00
Scorecard

Germany; 153 (41.1 overs)	v	Italy; 159/3 (33.4 overs)
Jonty Ryan 37 (64); Samuel Minietti 4/40 (10 overs)		Rehan Kiriella 54* (91); Maximilian Jackson 1/23 (3.4 overs)

Italy won by 7 wickets
Guernsey Rovers Athletic Club Ground, Port Soif
Umpires: George Brolly (Ire) and Adnan Khan (Esp)
Player of the match: Rehan Kiriella (Ita)

- Italy won the toss and elected to field.

7th-place Playoff
30 July 2026
11:00
Scorecard

France; 183 (43.2 overs)	v	Belgium; 187/4 (27.1 overs)
Navine Sureshan 64 (71); Hasaan Majid 2/24 (10 overs)		Shaurya Shah 74* (79); Mashdid Jubayer 3/41 (5 overs)

Belgium won by 6 wickets
Memorial Field, Saint Peter Port
Umpires: Heath Kearns (Jer) and Maulik Prabhudesai (Ned)
Player of the match: Navine Sureshan (Fra)

- France won the toss and elected to bat.

5th-place Playoff
30 July 2026
11:00
Scorecard

Switzerland; 340/7 (45 overs)	v	Isle of Man; 181 (34 overs)
Jayden Saville 106* (68); Matthew Cope 2/30 (5 overs)		Aaron Chadwick 47 (48); Anikait Maji 3/13 (4 overs)

Switzerland won by 159 runs
College Field, Saint Peter Port
Umpires: Johnny Kennedy (Ire) and Mark Jameson (Ger)
Player of the match: Jayden Saville (Sui)

- Switzerland won the toss and elected to bat.

3rd-place Playoff
30 July 2026
11:00
Scorecard

Guernsey; 305 (45 overs)	v	Germany; 227 (37.4 overs)
Ed Robinson 125 (108); Jonty Ryan 5/47 (9 overs)		Fredrick Tucker 76 (60); Ed Robinson 3/49 (6 overs)

Guernsey won by 78 runs
Guernsey Rovers Athletic Club Ground, Port Soif
Umpires: Gareth Morrison (Ire) and Russell Warren (Eng)
Player of the match: Ed Robinson (Gue)

- Guernsey won the toss and elected to bat.
- The match was reduced to 45 overs per side due to rain.

Final
30 July 2026
11:00
Scorecard

Sweden; 159 (49.1 overs)	v	Italy; 161/1 (33 overs)
Nischith Mokhamatam 28 (68); Thishen Perera 3/25 (9.1 overs)		Rehan Kiriella 54* (96); Nischith Mokhamatam 1/26 (9 overs)

Italy won by 9 wickets
King George V Sports Ground, Castel
Umpires: Graham Lloyd (Eng) and Iain McDonald (Sco)
Player of the match: Gianluca Larucci (Ita)

- Italy won the toss and elected to field.

== See also ==
- 2027 Under-19 Women's T20 World Cup
