= 2026 Under-19 Cricket World Cup qualification =

Cricket tournament

2026 ICC U19 Cricket World Cup qualification
- Dates: 25 February 2024 – 16 August 2025
- Administrators: International Cricket Council; Africa Cricket Association; Asian Cricket Council; ICC Americas; ICC East Asia-Pacific; ICC Europe
- Cricket format: 50 Over U19
- Participants: 43

The 2026 Under-19 Cricket World Cup qualification was a series of regional qualification tournaments to determine the final five teams for the 2026 Under-19 Men's Cricket World Cup.

== Qualified teams ==
Zimbabwe qualified directly as the full member host. Although Namibia is co-hosting the tournament, they were required to participate in the regional qualifiers. The top ten teams from the previous edition earned automatic qualification, while the remaining five spots were filled through regional qualifying events.

Details of the teams qualified for 2026 Under-19 Cricket World Cup
Team	Method of qualification	Date of qualification	Venue(s)	No. of teams	Last time qualified	Total times qualified	Previous best performance
Zimbabwe	Full member host	13 November 2022	—N/a	1	2024	15	7th place (2006)
Australia	2024 Under-19 Cricket World Cup (Top 10 teams from the previous tournament)	3 February 2024	South Africa	10	2024	15 (Note: Australia had qualified for the 2016 edition, but withdrew)	Winners (1998, 2002, 2010, 2024)
Bangladesh	2024 Under-19 Cricket World Cup (Top 10 teams from the previous tournament)	3 February 2024	South Africa	10	2024	15	Winners (2020)
England	2024 Under-19 Cricket World Cup (Top 10 teams from the previous tournament)	3 February 2024	South Africa	10	2024	16	Winners (1998)
India	2024 Under-19 Cricket World Cup (Top 10 teams from the previous tournament)	3 February 2024	South Africa	10	2024	16	Winners (2000, 2008, 2012, 2018, 2022)
Ireland	2024 Under-19 Cricket World Cup (Top 10 teams from the previous tournament)	3 February 2024	South Africa	10	2024	12	10th place (2010, 2022)
Pakistan	2024 Under-19 Cricket World Cup (Top 10 teams from the previous tournament)	3 February 2024	South Africa	10	2024	16	Winners (2002, 2004)
New Zealand	2024 Under-19 Cricket World Cup (Top 10 teams from the previous tournament)	3 February 2024	South Africa	10	2024	15 (Note: New Zealand had qualified for the 2022 edition, but withdrew)	Runners-up (1998)
Sri Lanka	2024 Under-19 Cricket World Cup (Top 10 teams from the previous tournament)	3 February 2024	South Africa	10	2024	16	Runners-up (2000)
South Africa	2024 Under-19 Cricket World Cup (Top 10 teams from the previous tournament)	3 February 2024	South Africa	10	2024	15	Winners (2014)
West Indies	2024 Under-19 Cricket World Cup (Top 10 teams from the previous tournament)	3 February 2024	South Africa	10	2024	16	Winners (2016)
Tanzania	Africa Qualifier	6 April 2025	Nigeria	1	—	1	Debut
Afghanistan	Asia Qualifier	19 April 2025	Nepal	1	2024	9	4th place (2018, 2022)
Japan	East Asia-Pacific Qualifier	29 April 2025	Japan	1	2020	2	16th place (2020)
Scotland	Europe Qualifier	6 August 2025	Scotland	1	2024	11	11th place (2012)
United States	Americas Qualifier	16 August 2025	United States	1	2024	4	12th place (2006)
Total				16			

== Africa ==
The African qualifier had two divisions, with the top teams from the Division 2 tournament progressing to the main Africa qualification tournament.

Division 2		Division 1
Group A	Group B	Division 1
Botswana; Malawi; Rwanda; Sierra Leone	Ghana; Mozambique; Nigeria; Tanzania	Kenya; Namibia; Nigeria; Sierra Leone; Tanzania; Uganda

=== Africa - Division 2 ===
The following teams took part in the Division 2 tournament, which took place from 2 to 11 August 2024 in Tanzania.

Group A	Group B
Botswana; Malawi; Rwanda; Sierra Leone	Ghana; Mozambique; Nigeria; Tanzania

=== Group A ===
Pos	Team	Pld	W	L	Pts	NRR	Qualification
1	Sierra Leone	3	3	0	6	2.441	Advanced to the semi-finals
2	Rwanda	3	1	2	2	0.087	Advanced to the semi-finals
3	Malawi	3	1	2	2	−0.690	
4	Botswana	3	1	2	2	−1.067	

Source: Cricclubs

==== Fixtures ====
3 August 2024
09:30
Scorecard

Rwanda; 51 (19 overs)	v	Sierra Leone; 52/3 (12.1 overs)
Jean Imanishimwe 19 (36); George Sesay 4/15 (6 overs)		Raymond Coker 20* (16); Rukundo Confiance 3/20 (5 overs)

Sierra Leone won by 7 wickets
Dar Gymkhana Club Ground, Dar-es-Salaam
Umpires: Adil Kassam (Zim) and Isaac Oyieko (Ken)

- Sierra Leone won the toss and elected to field.

3 August 2024
09:30
Scorecard

Botswana; 149 (47.5 overs)	v	Malawi; 88 (23.5 overs)
Ayush Harith 32 (125); Precious Sapesa 4/31 (10 overs)		Phillip Zuze 37 (46); Merrick Reed 2/30 (8 overs)

Botswana won by 61 runs
University of Dar es Salaam Ground, Dar-es-Salaam
Umpires: Olumide Akintokun (Nga) and Patrick Makumbi (Uga)
Player of the match: Aryan Pattamana (Bot)

- Malawi won the toss and elected to field.

5 August 2024
09:30
Scorecard

Malawi; 102 (32.3 overs)	v	Sierra Leone; 103/4 (30 overs)
Phillip Zuze 24 (43); Raymond Coker 4/21 (8 overs)		Raymond Coker 30 (64); Suhail Vayani 3/21 (10 overs)

Sierra Leone won by 6 wickets
Dar Gymkhana Club Ground, Dar-es-Salaam
Umpires: Olumide Akintokun (Nga) and Isaac Oyieko (Ken)
Player of the match: Raymond Coker (Sle)

- Sierra Leone won the toss and elected to field.

5 August 2024
09:30
Scorecard

Rwanda; 224 (50 overs)	v	Botswana; 121 (38.2 overs)
Chris Namuhoranye 69 (66); Muhammed Chand 2/17 (4 overs)		Monroux Kasselman 43 (50); Yves Cyusa 2/7 (4.2 overs)

Rwanda won by 103 runs
University of Dar es Salaam Ground, Dar-es-Salaam
Umpires: Musa Bodie (Nga) and Adil Kassam (Zim)
Player of the match: Yves Cyusa (Rwa)

- Rwanda won the toss and elected to bat.

7 August 2024
09:30
Scorecard

Botswana; 65 (28.3 overs)	v	Sierra Leone; 67/3 (14.5 overs)
Monroux Kasselman 22 (26); Raymond Coker 4/9 (9 overs)		David Halloway 38* (32); Aryan Pattamana 3/25 (6.5 overs)

Sierra Leone won by 7 wickets
Dar Gymkhana Club Ground, Dar-es-Salaam
Umpires: Adil Kassam (Zim) and David Odhiambo (Ken)
Player of the match: Raymond Coker (Sle)

- Botswana won the toss and elected to bat.

7 August 2024
09:30
Scorecard

Malawi; 70 (33 overs)	v	Rwanda; 63 (34.2 overs)
Hamza Vayani 15 (46); Elise Gihozo 5/15 (10 overs)		Nziza Jasper 20 (64); Bright Balala 3/11 (8.2 overs)

Malawi won by 7 runs
University of Dar es Salaam Ground, Dar-es-Salaam
Umpires: Musa Bodie (Nga) and Claus Schumacher (Nam)
Player of the match: Hamza Vayani (Mwi)

- Malawi won the toss and elected to bat.

=== Group B ===
Pos	Team	Pld	W	L	Pts	NRR	Qualification
1	Tanzania	3	3	0	6	3.949	Advanced to the semi-finals
2	Nigeria	3	2	1	4	2.711	Advanced to the semi-finals
3	Ghana	3	1	2	2	−1.413	
4	Mozambique	3	0	3	0	−6.334	

Source: Cricclubs

==== Fixtures ====
2 August 2024
09:30
Scorecard

Nigeria; 127 (45.4 overs)	v	Tanzania; 128/4 (35.4 overs)
Femi Oresenwo 26 (42); Laksh Bakrania 3/19 (10 overs)		Karim Kiseto 57 (88); Progress Osagie 2/22 (8 overs)

Tanzania won by 6 wickets
Dar Gymkhana Club Ground, Dar-es-Salaam
Umpires: Chris Gasana (Tan) and Claus Schumacher (Nam)
Player of the match: Laksh Bakrania (Tan)

- Nigeria won the toss and elected to bat.

2 August 2024
09:30
Scorecard

Mozambique; 80 (34.3 overs)	v	Ghana; 81/6 (11.4 overs)
Antonio Laice 17 (52); Lee Nyarko 5/25 (10 overs)		Lee Nyarko 30 (28); Charles Mbebe 3/21 (4.4 overs)

Ghana won by 4 wickets
University of Dar es Salaam Ground, Dar-es-Salaam
Umpires: Musa Bodie (Nga) and David Odhiambo (Ken)
Player of the match: Lee Nyarko (Gha)

- Mozambique won the toss and elected to bat.

4 August 2024
09:30
Scorecard

Nigeria; 362/8 (50 overs)	v	Mozambique; 48 (18.5 overs)
Hossana Omokhobio 69 (95); Eugenio Azine 3/58 (10 overs)		Antonio Laice 20 (44); Gafar Kareem 3/10 (2.5 overs)

Nigeria won by 314 runs
Dar Gymkhana Club Ground, Dar-es-Salaam
Umpires: Simon Kintu (Uga) and David Odhiambo (Ken)
Player of the match: Gafar Kareem (Nga)

- Nigeria won the toss and elected to bat.

4 August 2024
09:30
Scorecard

Tanzania; 215 (35.4 overs)	v	Ghana; 53 (16.3 overs)
Karim Kiseto 91 (82); Lee Nyarko 4/60 (9.4 overs)		Bernard Neequaye 20 (29); Laksh Bakrania 4/11 (2.3 overs)

Tanzania won by 162 runs
University of Dar es Salaam Ground, Dar-es-Salaam
Umpires: Olumide Akintokun (Nga) and Chris Gasana (Tan)
Player of the match: Khalidy Juma (Tan)

- Tanzania won the toss and elected to bat.

6 August 2024
09:30
Scorecard

Tanzania; 379/4 (50 overs)	v	Mozambique; 26 (12.3 overs)
Karim Kiseto 133 (105); Manuel Bembele 1/68 (10 overs)		Filipe Nelson 8 (15); Hamza Onai 3/1 (1.3 overs)

Tanzania won by 353 runs
Dar Gymkhana Club Ground, Dar-es-Salaam
Umpires: Simon Kintu (Uga) and Claus Schumacher (Nam)
Player of the match: Karim Kiseto (Tan)

- Tanzania won the toss and elected to bat.

6 August 2024
09:30
Scorecard

Nigeria; 183 (40.4 overs)	v	Ghana; 64 (27.1 overs)
Femi Oresenwo 49 (75); Prince Adotei 3/36 (7.4 overs)		Derrick Ateak 18 (42); Okasha Isiyaku 4/15 (6.1 overs)

Nigeria won by 119 runs
University of Dar es Salaam Ground, Dar-es-Salaam
Umpires: Chris Gasana (Tan) and Patrick Makumbi (Uga)

- Nigeria won the toss and elected to bat.

=== Semi-finals ===
==== Semi-final 1 ====
9 August 2024
09:30
Scorecard

Nigeria; 116 (31.3 overs)	v	Sierra Leone; 119/1 (19 overs)
Peculiar Egamasi 29 (44); Samuel Humper 3/11 (3.3 overs)		Alusine Turay 65* (52); Kenneth Boniface 1/12 (1 over)

Sierra Leone won by 9 wickets
Dar Gymkhana Club Ground, Dar-es-Salaam
Player of the match: Raymond Coker (Sle)

- Sierra Leone won the toss and elected to field.

==== Semi-final 2 ====
9 August 2024
09:30
Scorrecard

Tanzania; 164/9 (50 overs)	v	Rwanda; 105 (42 overs)
Darpan Jobanputra 56 (132); Rukundo Confiance 2/25 (5 overs)		Yves Cyusa 55 (109); Khalidy Juma 3/30 (9 overs)

Tanzania won by 59 runs
University of Dar es Salaam Ground, Dar-es-Salaam
Player of the match: Darpan Jobanputra (Tan)

- Tanzania won the toss and elected to bat.

==== 3rd play-off ====
11 August 2024
09:30
Scorecard

Rwanda; 45 (23.4 overs)	v	Nigeria; 46/3 (12.3 overs)
Chris Namuhoranye 23 (36); Gafar Kareem 4/8 (5.4 overs)		Peculiar Egamasi 26* (21); Elise Gihozo 3/20 (5 overs)

Nigeria won 7 wickets
University of Dar es Salaam Ground, Dar-es-Salaam
Player of the match: Gafar Kareem (Nga)

- Nigeria won the toss and elected to field.

==== Final ====
11 August 2024
09:30
Scorecard

Tanzania; 178/8 (50 overs)	v	Sierra Leone; 98/8 (29 overs)
Mohamed Simba 29 (37); Mohamed Turay 2/25 (10 overs)		Sahr Lebbie 30 (52); Hamza Onai 2/14 (6 overs)

Tanzania won by 36 runs (DLS method)
Dar Gymkhana Club Ground, Dar-es-Salaam
Player of the match: Laksh Bakrania (Tan)

- Sierra Leone won the toss and elected to field.

=== Africa - Division 1 ===
Sierra Leone and Tanzania (who qualified after winning the semi-finals) and Nigeria (who qualified after defeating Rwanda for 3rd place) were joined by Kenya, Namibia, and Uganda in the Division 1 tournament, which took place from 28 March to 6 April 2025 in Nigeria.

==== Points table ====
Pos	Team	Pld	W	L	NR	Pts	NRR	Qualification
1	Tanzania	5	5	0	0	10	1.456	Qualified to the 2026 Under-19 Cricket World Cup
2	Namibia	5	4	1	0	8	1.077	
3	Kenya	5	3	2	0	6	−0.102	
4	Uganda	5	2	3	0	4	−0.871	
5	Nigeria	5	1	4	0	2	−0.150	
6	Sierra Leone	5	0	5	0	0	−1.380	

Source: Cricheroes

==== Fixtures ====
28 March 2025
09:30
Scorecard

Namibia; 133 (47.5 overs)	v	Nigeria; 123 (40.2 overs)
Max Heingo 22 (20); Ukasha Isiyaku 5/34 (10 overs)		Rahmon Ali 53 (46); Rowan Van Vuuren 2/22 (8 overs)

Namibia won by 10 runs
Tafawa Balewa Square Cricket Oval, Lagos
Player of the match: Erik Lintvelt (Nam)

- Namibia won the toss and elected to bat.

28 March 2025
09:30
Scorecard

Kenya; 149 (48.4 overs)	v	Sierra Leone; 91 (20.1 overs)
Yash Gohil 29 (90); George Sesay 5/29 (8.4 overs)		Raymond Coker 32 (29); Akshith Sekar 3/37 (7 overs)

Kenya won by 58 runs
University of Lagos Cricket Oval, Lagos
Player of the match: Akshith Sekar (Ken)

- Sierra Leone won the toss and elected to field.

29 March 2025
09:30
Scorecard

Tanzania; 189/8 (50 overs)	v	Uganda; 116 (39 overs)
Laksh Bakrania 60 (111); Abdulaziz Tandia 3/26 (10 overs)		Devansh Patel 25 (84); Raymond Francis 5/27 (9 overs)

Tanzania won by 73 runs
Tafawa Balewa Square Cricket Oval, Lagos
Player of the match: Agustino Meya Mwamele (Tan)

- Uganda won the toss and elected to field.

29 March 2025
09:30
Scorecard

Namibia; 161 (45.4 overs)	v	Sierra Leone; 115 (48.2 overs)
Liam Basson 39 (71); Daniel Lassayo 4/19 (8.4 overs)		Sahr Lebbie 19 (72); Rowan Van Vuuren 2/9 (10 overs)

Namibia won by 46 runs
University of Lagos Cricket Oval, Lagos
Player of the match: Faf du Plessis (Nam)

- Namibia won the toss and elected to bat.

30 March 2025
09:30
Scorecard

Tanzania; 154 (47.2 overs)	v	Nigeria; 32 (16.1 overs)
Laksh Bakrania 44 (79); Abdulganiyu Abdullahi 3/26 (7 overs)		Egemasi Chimbuchi 7 (13); Laksh Bakrania 3/11 (7 overs)

Tanzania won by 122 runs
Tafawa Balewa Square Cricket Oval, Lagos
Player of the match: Laksh Bakrania (Tan)

- Tanzania won the toss and elected to bat.

30 March 2025
09:30
Scorecard

Uganda; 69 (19.5 overs)	v	Kenya; 70/3 (34.5 overs)
Ocen Peter 28 (28); Krishil Patel 4/11 (3.5 overs)		Stian Smith 29 (38); Musa Majid Ramathan 2/19 (9 overs)

Kenya won by 7 wickets
University of Lagos Cricket Oval, Lagos
Player of the match: Neel Doshi (Ken)

- Uganda won the toss and elected to bat.

1 April 2025
09:30
Scorecard

Tanzania; 159 (47 overs)	v	Namibia; 142 (48 overs)
Mohamedi Mbaki 61* (73); Max Heingo 3/32 (9 overs)		Tiaan Van Der Merwe 32 (74); Khalidy Juma 3/15 (8 overs)

Tanzania won by 17 runs
Tafawa Balewa Square Cricket Oval, Lagos
Player of the match: Faf Du Plessis (Nam)

- Tanzania won the toss and elected to bat.

1 April 2025
09:30
Scorecard

Sierra Leone; 119 (47.4 overs)	v	Uganda; 122/5 (43 overs)
George Sesay 42 (108); Balidawa Ali 3/11 (10 overs)		Devansh Patel 25 (87); Raymond Coker 2/25 (10 overs)

Uganda won by 5 wickets
University of Lagos Cricket Oval, Lagos
Player of the match: Balidawa Ali (Uga)

- Uganda won the toss and elected to field.

2 April 2025
09:30
Scorecard

Kenya; 85/5 (29.1 overs)	v	Nigeria; 93/6 (26 overs)
Rayan Kassam 27 (73); Abdulganiyu Abdullahi 2/19 (6 overs)		Kareem Gafar 20* (33); Akshith Sekar 2/19 (5 overs)

Kenya won by 4 runs (DLS Method)
Tafawa Balewa Square Cricket Oval, Lagos
Player of the match: Abdulganiyu Abdullahi (Nam)

- Kenya won the toss and elected to bat.
- No further play was possible in the first innings and the second innings was reduced to 26 overs due to rain.
- Nigeria were set a revised target of 98 from 26 overs.

2 April 2025
09:30
Scorecard

Namibia; 135/3 (36 overs)	v	Uganda; 68 (23.5 overs)
Tiaan Van Der Merwe 53 (107); Sohera Richard 2/26 (10 overs)		Nyiiro Jonathan 16 (24); Max Heingo 3/20 (6 overs)

Namibia won by 67 runs
University of Lagos Cricket Oval, Lagos
Player of the match: Francois Du Plessis (Nam)

- Namibia won the toss and elected to bat.
- The match was reduced to 36 overs due to rain.

3 April 2025
09:30
Scorecard

Tanzania; 114 (41.1 overs)	v	Kenya; 60 (42.5 overs)
Dylan Thakrar 20 (24); Stian Smith 3/26 (8.1 overs)		Neel Doshi 18 (71); Hamza Onai 3/19 (9.5 overs)

Tanzania won by 54 runs
Tafawa Balewa Square Cricket Oval, Lagos
Player of the match: Raymond Francis(Tan)

- Tanzania won the toss and elected to bat.

3 April 2025
09:30
Scorecard

Nigeria; 186/9 (50 overs)	v	Sierra Leone; 69 (29.5 overs)
Kenneth Boniface 47* (63); George Sesay 3/48 (9 overs)		Michael Kabia 10 (21); Oladejo Emmanuel 4/24 (10 overs)

Nigeria won by 117 runs
University of Lagos Cricket Oval, Lagos
Player of the match: Oladejo Emmanuel (Nig)

- Sierra Leone won the toss and elected to field.

5 April 2025
09:30
Scorecard

Kenya; 83 (40.5 overs)	v	Namibia; 87/6 (23.1 overs)
Yash Gohil 31* (78); Rowan Van Vuuren 3/12 (9.5 overs)		Erik Lintvelt 35 (58); Saijeeth Chidambaran 2/19 (6 overs)

Namibia won by 4 wickets
Tafawa Balewa Square Cricket Oval, Lagos
Player of the match: Faf du Plessis (Nam)

- Kenya won the toss and elected to bat.

5 April 2025
09:30
Scorecard

Tanzania; 179 (49.4 overs)	v	Sierra Leone; 81 (26.4 overs)
Laksh Bakrania 53 (82); Daniel Lassayo 4/36 (10 overs)		Alusine Turay 21 (36); Hamza Onai 5/24 (8 overs)

Tanzania won by 98 runs
University of Lagos Cricket Oval, Lagos
Player of the match: Hamza Onai (Tan)

- Tanzania won the toss and elected to bat.

6 April 2025
09:30
Scorecard

Uganda; 84 (37.5 overs)	v	Nigeria; 69 (27.2 overs)
Olipa Gerald 28 (54); Oladejo Emmanuel 4/13 (10 overs)		Rahmon Ali 40 (69); Balidawa Ali 3/18 (6 overs)

Uganda won by 15 runs
Tafawa Balewa Square Cricket Oval, Lagos
Player of the match: Balidawa Ali (Uga)

== Americas ==
The Americas qualifier took place in a single division, with the tournament held in the United States from 9 to 16 August 2025 with four teams participating.

- United States
- Bermuda
- Canada
- Argentina

=== Points table ===
Pos	Team	Pld	W	L	NR	Pts	NRR	Qualification
1	United States (H)	6	6	0	0	12	4.101	Qualified to the 2026 Under-19 Cricket World Cup
2	Canada	6	3	2	1	7	2.490	
3	Bermuda	6	2	4	0	4	−1.728	
4	Argentina	6	0	5	1	1	−5.906	

(H) Host

==== Fixtures ====
9 August 2025
10:30
Scorecard

United States; 236/6 (50 overs)	v	Canada; 171/9 (50 overs)
Amrinder Gill 76 (144); Yuvraj Samra 2/37 (9 overs)		Jagmandeep Paul 35 (73); Adit Kappa 3/21 (10 overs)

United States won by 65 runs
Param Veers Sports Complex, Rydal, Georgia
Player of the match: Saharsh Shwethan (USA)

- Canada won the toss and elected to field.

9 August 2025
10:30
Scorecard

Bermuda; 318/8 (50 overs)	v	Argentina; 81 (26.2 overs)
Luke Fulton 74 (60); Muhammad Abaidullah 4/57 (9 overs)		Alvaro Minardi 22* (34); Sa-Qui Robinson 5/13 (10 overs)

Bermuda won by 237 runs
Param Veers Sports Complex, Rydal, Georgia

- Bermuda won the toss and elected to bat.

10 August 2025
10:30
Scorecard

United States; 310/9 (50 overs)	v	Bermuda; 106 (32.2 overs)
Amrinder Gill 102 (122); Keegan Jones 2/52 (10 overs)		Sa-Qui Robinson 34 (42); Sabrish Prasad 4/37 (10 overs)

United States won by 204 runs
Param Veers Sports Complex, Rydal, Georgia
Player of the match: Amrinder Gill (USA)

- United States won the toss and elected to bat.

10 August 2025
10:30
Scorecard

Argentina; 23 (19.4 overs)	v	Canada; 24/0 (0.5 overs)
Otto Sorondo 7 (37); Jagmandeep Paul 6/7 (5 overs)		Yuvraj Samra 20* (4)

Canada won by 10 wickets
Param Veers Sports Complex, Rydal, Georgia

- Argentina won the toss and elected to bat.

12 August 2025
10:30
Scorecard

Argentina; 19 (10.3 overs)	v	United States; 20/1 (2.2 overs)
Valentin Bur 6 (10); Ansh Rai 4/2 (1.3 overs)		Nitish Sudini 14* (8); Valentin Bur 1/10 (1.2 overs)

United States won by 9 wickets
Param Veers Sports Complex, Rydal, Georgia
Player of the match: Ansh Rai (USA)

- United States won the toss and elected to field.

12 August 2025
10:30
Scorecard

Bermuda; 60 (16.5 overs)	v	Canada; 62/2 (4.5 overs)
Isaiah O'Brien 13 (13); Jagmandeep Paul 3/7 (3 overs)		Aryan Sidhu 35* (13); Luke Horan 2/23 (2 overs)

Canada won by 8 wickets
Param Veers Sports Complex, Rydal, Georgia
Umpires: Jermaine Lindo (USA) and Vijaya Mallela (USA)
Player of the match: Jagmandeep Paul (Can)

- Canada won the toss and elected to field.

13 August 2025
10:30
Scorecard

Bermuda; 55 (32.5 overs)	v	United States; 56/3 (6.4 overs)
Luke Horan 21 (50); Utkarsh Srivastava 2/3 (2.5 overs)		Nitish Sudini 27 (13); Luke Horan 2/25 (3 overs)

United States won by 7 wickets
Param Veers Sports Complex, Rydal, Georgia
Player of the match: Supransh Kumar (USA)

- Bermuda won the toss and elected to bat.
- The match was reduced to 40 overs per side due to wet outfield.

13 August 2025
10:30
Scorecard

Canada; 360/9 (42 overs)	v	Argentina; 16/1 (1.5 overs)
Aryan Sidhu 85 (58); Alvaro Minardi 3/47 (8 overs)		Tomas Rossi 6* (1); Zohaib Syed 1/6 (0.5 overs)

No result
Param Veers Sports Complex, Rydal, Georgia

- Canada won the toss and elected to bat.
- The match was reduced to 42 overs per side due to rain.
- No further play was possible due to rain.

15 August 2025
10:30
Scorecard

Argentina; 34 (15.5 overs)	v	United States; 35/1 (6.1 overs)
Juan Moline 13 (35); Sahir Bhatia 5/9 (4.5 overs)		Amrinder Gill 21* (20); Muhammad Abaidullah 1/8 (2 overs)

United States won by 9 wickets
Param Veers Sports Complex, Rydal, Georgia
Player of the match: Sahir Bhatia (USA)

- United States won the toss and elected to field.

15 August 2025
10:30
Scorecard

Canada; 147 (39.5 overs)	v	Bermuda; 94/6 (34.4 overs)
Shivam Sharma 54 (74); Isiah O'Brien 3/34 (8.5 overs)		Luke Horan 36 (60); Tony Cox 1/9 (5 overs)

Canada won by 13 runs (DLS method)
Param Veers Sports Complex, Rydal, Georgia
Player of the match: Shivam Sharma (Can)

- Bermuda won the toss and elected to field.

16 August 2025
10:30
Scorecard

Canada; 93 (24.1 overs)	v	United States; 94/3 (24.1 overs)
Yuvraj Samra 35 (34); Sahir Bhatia 3/5 (3.1 overs)		Utkarsh Srivastava 28* (41); Dominic Dainstor 1/10 (2.1 overs)

United States won by 7 wickets
Param Veers Sports Complex, Rydal, Georgia
Player of the match: Sahir Bhatia (USA)

- United States won the toss and elected to field.
- The match was reduced to 31 overs per side due to rain.

16 August 2025
10:30
Scorecard

Bermuda; 144/8 (31 overs)	v	Argentina; 66 (15.5 overs)
Sa-Qui Robinson 42 (56); Valentine Bur 2/20 (5 overs)		Vicente Romanin 35 (34); Luke Horan 4/14 (5.5 overs)

Bermuda won by 78 runs
Param Veers Sports Complex, Rydal, Georgia
Player of the match: Sa-Qui Robinson (Ber)

- Argentina won the toss and elected to field.
- The match was reduced to 31 overs per side due to rain.

== Asia ==
The Asian qualifier was held in two divisions, with two teams from the Division 2 tournament progressing to the main qualification tournament.

Division 2		Division 1
Group A	Group B	Division 1
Bahrain; Kuwait; Malaysia; Thailand	Bhutan; Hong Kong; Oman; Saudi Arabia	Afghanistan; Oman; Nepal; Hong Kong; United Arab Emirates

=== Asia - Division 2 ===
The following teams took part in the Division 2 tournament, which took place from 25 February to 5 March 2024 in Thailand.

Group A	Group B
Bahrain; Kuwait; Malaysia; Thailand	Bhutan; Hong Kong; Oman; Saudi Arabia

==== Group A ====
Pos	Team	Pld	W	L	NR	Pts	NRR	Qualification
1	Kuwait	3	3	0	0	6	1.464	Advanced to the semi-finals
2	Malaysia	3	2	1	0	4	0.747	Advanced to the semi-finals
3	Bahrain	3	1	2	0	2	−0.527	
4	Thailand	3	0	3	0	0	−1.651	

Source: Cricclubs

==== Fixtures ====
25 February 2024
09:30
Scorecard

Thailand; 150 (34.3 overs)	v	Bahrain; 153/5 (38.2 overs)
Pattarapol Jirapatananukul 28 (59); Muhammad Akram 3/23 (7.3 overs)		Aryan Ashwin 56 (86); Phanuwat Desungnoen 1/26 (10 overs)

Bahrain won by 5 wickets
Terdthai Cricket Ground, Bangkok
Umpires: Lyndon Hannibal (SL) and Suresh Subramanian (Ina)
Player of the match: Aryan Ashwin (Bhr)

- Bahrain won the toss and elected to field.

25 February 2024
09:30
Scorecard

Malaysia; 108 (29.3 overs)	v	Kuwait; 109/5 (34.5 overs)
Muhammad Akram Malek 44* (84); Janath Jeewanga 4/36 (9 overs)		Jay Maheshkumar 20 (42); Haziq Haiqal Idris 3/23 (7 overs)

Kuwait won by 5 wickets
Asian Institute of Technology Ground, Bangkok
Umpires: Vinod Babu (Oma) and Nimali Perera (SL)
Player of the match: Janath Jeewanga (Kuw)

- Malaysia won the toss and elected to bat.

27 February 2024
09:30
Scorecard

Kuwait; 171/9 (50 overs)	v	Thailand; 87 (20.2 overs)
Asmeet Avinash Jadhav 31 (84); Natpakhan Manowon 4/44 (8 overs)		Natpakhan Manowon 51* (46); Muhammad Aqif 4/35 (9 overs)

Kuwait won by 84 runs
Terdthai Cricket Ground, Bangkok
Umpires: Nimali Perera (SL)
Player of the match: Natpakhan Manowon (Tha)

- Thailand won the toss and elected field.

27 February 2024
09:30
Scorecard

Bahrain; 127 (43.4 overs)	v	Malaysia; 129/7 (38.4 overs)
Aryan Ashwin 28 (72); Aiman Abdul Haizad 4/36 (10 overs)		Hairil Harisan 42* (92); Mounish Swamy 2/16 (7 overs)

Malaysia won by 3 wickets
Asian Institute of Technology Ground, Bangkok
Umpires: Vinod Babu (Oma)
Player of the match: Muhammad Muqri Jafri (Mas)

- Malaysia won the toss and elected to field.

29 February 2024
09:30
Scorecard

Malaysia; 241/7 (50 overs)	v	Thailand; 128 (47.1 overs)
Muhammad Akram Malek 114* (114); Natpakhan Manowon 2/27 (8 overs)		Danuphon Fuangyotpinit 41 (93); Qaleef Khalid 3/19 (10 overs)

Malaysia won by 113 runs
Terdthai Cricket Ground, Bangkok
Umpires: Suresh Subramanian (INA) and Nimali Perera (SL)
Player of the match: Muhammad Akram Malek (Mas)

- Thailand won the toss and elected to field.

29 February 2024
09:30
Scorecard

Kuwait; 201/6 (50 overs)	v	Bahrain; 126 (37.4 overs)
Jay Maheshkumar 64 (76); Muhammad Adil 2/20 (4 overs)		Abhinav Girish 50 (78); Janath Jeewanga 4/27 (10 overs)

Kuwait won by 75 runs
Asian Institute of Technology Ground, Bangkok
Player of the match: Jay Maheshkumar (Kuw)

- Bahrain won the toss and elected to field.

==== Group B ====
Pos	Team	Pld	W	L	NR	Pts	NRR	Qualification
1	Oman	3	3	0	0	6	1.733	Advanced to the semi-finals
2	Hong Kong	3	2	1	0	4	0.799	Advanced to the semi-finals
3	Saudi Arabia	3	1	2	0	2	−1.615	
4	Bhutan	3	0	3	0	0	−1.075	

Source: Cricclubs

==== Fixtures ====
26 February 2024
09:30
Scorecard

Bhutan; 85 (31.4 overs)	v	Hong Kong; 86/6 (24.5 overs)
Tshering Rigden 24 (39); Shayan Puri 4/18 (10 overs)		Khrish Mukesh Butani 20* (27); Sangay Dorji 2/18 (7 overs)

Hong Kong won by 4 wickets
Terdthai Cricket Ground, Bangkok
Umpires: Vinod Babu (Oma) and Shivani Mishra (Qat)
Player of the match: Shayan Puri (HK)

- Bhutan won the toss and elected to bat.

26 February 2024
09:30
Scorecard

Oman; 222/8 (50 overs)	v	Saudi Arabia; 81 (19.2 overs)
Nitish Nadendla 60 (65); Zuber Sunasara 2/18 (7.1 overs)		Fahad Munir 15 (15); Arya Hemal Sampat 4/21 (6 overs)

Oman won by 141 runs
Asian Institute of Technology Ground, Bangkok
Umpires: Nimali Perera (SL) and Ashwani Kumar Rana (Tha)
Player of the match: Nitish Nadendla (Oma)

- Oman won the toss and elected to bat.

28 February 2024
09:30
Scorecard

Bhutan; 178 (47 overs)	v	Saudi Arabia; 179/9 (49.2 overs)
Tenjin Rabgey 44 (38); Taha Vaseem 4/27 (10 overs)		Mohammad Zuber 31 (42); Sangay Dorji 2/33 (10 overs)

Saudi Arabia won by 1 wicket
Terdthai Cricket Ground, Bangkok
Umpires: Vinod Babu (Oma) and Nimali Perera (SL)
Player of the match: Ahmed Faisal (Sau)

- Bhutan won the toss and elected to bat.

28 February 2024
09:30
Scorecard

Oman; 180 (50 overs)	v	Hong Kong; 127 (46 overs)
Rahil Daniyal 58 (90); Rishan Shah 7/21 (8 overs)		Matthew Clayton 28 (69); Varshieth Saai Dinesh 3/14 (5 overs)

Oman won by 53 runs
Asian Institute of Technology Ground, Bangkok
Player of the match: Rahil Daniyal (Oma)

- Oman won the toss and elected to bat.

1 March 2024
09:30
Scorecard

Saudi Arabia; 133 (36.3 overs)	v	Hong Kong; 134/3 (25.4 overs)
Fahad Munir 59 (42); Daniel Mapp 3/44 (8 overs)		Shiv Mathur 63* (63); Fahad Munir 1/14 (4 overs)

Hong Kong won by 7 wickets
Terdthai Cricket Ground, Bangkok
Player of the match: Shiv Mathur (HK)

- Saudi Arabia won the toss and elected to bat.

1 March 2024
09:30
Scorecard

Bhutan; 141/7 (50 overs)	v	Oman; 142/7 (34 overs)
Tenjin Rabgey 44 (56); Saumya Sampat 2/22 (10 overs)		Nitish Nadendla 33* (29); Choedra Jamtsho 3/37 (8 overs)

Oman won by 3 wickets
Asian Institute of Technology Ground, Bangkok

- Oman won the toss and elected to field.

=== Play-offs ===
==== Semi-finals ====
3 March 2024
09:30
Scorecard

Hong Kong; 234/3 (50 overs)	v	Kuwait; 201/9 (50 overs)
Taran Laugani 85 (138); Abdur Rehman 1/43 (9 overs)		Jay Maheshkumar 77* (90); Paarth Srivastava 2/24 (8 overs)

Hong Kong won by 33 runs
Terdthai Cricket Ground, Bangkok
Umpires: Vinod Babu (Oma) and Suresh Subramanian (Ina)
Player of the match: Taran Laugani (HK)

- Hong Kong won the toss and elected to bat.

3 March 2024
09:30
Scorecard

Oman; 154 (47.2 overs)	v	Malaysia; 135 (45.5 overs)
Jeet Shah 29 (92); Mohamad Fathul Fatri 1/17 (7 overs)		Hairil Harisan 38 (70); Prathiesh Ramesh 3/26 (10 overs)

Oman won by 19 runs
Asian Institute of Technology Ground, Bangkok
Umpires: Lyndon Hannibal (SL) and Ashwani Kumar Rana (Tha)

- Malaysia won the toss and elected to field.

==== Final ====
5 March 2024
09:30
Scorecard

Oman; 249/5 (50 overs)	v	Hong Kong; 149/9 (50 overs)
Nitish Nadendla 51* (35); Harry Hodgson 2/45 (10 overs)		Matthew Clayton 50 (88); Saumya Sampat 3/25 (10 overs)

Oman won by 100 runs
Terdthai Cricket Ground, Bangkok
Umpires: Shivani Mishra (Qat) and Nimali Perera (SL)
Player of the match: Saumya Sampat (Oma)

- Oman won the toss and elected to bat.

=== Asia - Division 1 ===
The two finalists Hong Kong and Oman from the Division 2 joined Nepal, Afghanistan, and United Arab Emirates for the Asia - Division 1 tournament. Nepal hosted Asia - Division 1 in Kathmandu from 13 to 19 April 2025.

==== Points table ====
Pos	Team	Pld	W	L	NR	Pts	NRR	Qualification
1	Afghanistan	4	3	0	1	7	4.817	Qualified to the 2026 Under-19 Cricket World Cup
2	Nepal	4	3	0	1	7	3.576	
3	Hong Kong	4	1	2	1	3	−1.344	
4	United Arab Emirates	4	0	2	2	2	−2.229	
5	Oman	4	0	3	1	1	−4.803	

Source: Cricclubs

==== Fixtures ====
13 April 2025
09:30
Scorecard

Oman; 90 (36.2 overs)	v	Afghanistan; 92/2 (11.1 overs)
Pratheish Ramesh 17 (53); Mahboob Khan 2/9 (4.2 overs)		Khalid Ahmadzai 40 (30); Pratheish Ramesh 1/24 (3.1 overs)

Afghanistan won by 8 wickets
Mulpani International Cricket Ground, Kageshwari-Manohara
Player of the match: Hafieezullah Zadran (Afg)

- Oman won the toss and elected to bat.

13 April 2025
09:30
Scorecard

Nepal; 200/9 (40 overs)	v	United Arab Emirates; 171/7 (36 overs)
Naren Bhatta 67 (75); Uddish Suri 3/26 (8 overs)		Yayin Rai 104* (96); Santosh Yadav 2/23 (8 overs)

Nepal won by 5 runs (DLS method)
Mulpani Cricket Stadium, Kageshwari-Manohara
Player of the match: Yayin Rai (UAE)

- United Arab Emirates won the toss and elected to field.
- The match was reduced to 40 overs per side due to wet outfield.
- Bad light during second innings prevented any further play, Nepal were ahead of the revised target of 176.

14 April 2025
09:30
Scorecard

Oman; 117 (38 overs)	v	Nepal; 118/2 (14.3 overs)
Jeet Vrajesh Shah 52 (78); Yuvraj Khatri 5/15 (7 overs)		Niraj Yadav 46 (31); Saumya Bhavin Sampat 2/31 (6 overs)

Nepal won by 8 wickets
Mulpani International Cricket Ground, Kageshwari-Manohara
Player of the match: Yuvraj Khatri (Nep)

- Nepal won the toss and elected to field.

14 April 2025
09:30
Scorecard

Hong Kong; 70 (36.2 overs)	v	Afghanistan; 71/2 (14.2 overs)
Preet Mangukiya 14 (27); Hafieezullah Zadran 3/16 (8.2 overs)		Khalid Ahmadzai 30* (38); Daniel Mapp 2/19 (4 overs)

Afghanistan won by 8 wickets
Mulpani Cricket Stadium, Kageshwari-Manohara
Player of the match: Hafieezullah Zadran (Afg)

- Hong Kong won the toss and elected to bat.

16 April 2025
09:30
Scorecard

Afghanistan; 359/4 (50 overs)	v	United Arab Emirates; 168/7 (47 overs)
Khalid Ahmadzai 132 (124); Yug Sharma 2/67 (10 overs)		Muhammad Rayan 64 (99); Nooristani Omarzai 3/40 (10 overs)

Afghanistan won by 180 runs (DLS method)
Mulpani International Cricket Ground, Kageshwari-Manohara
Player of the match: Khalid Ahmadzai (AFG)

- Afghanistan won the toss and elected to bat.
- United Arab Emirates were set a revised target of 349 from 47 overs due to rain.

16 April 2025
09:30
Scorecard

Hong Kong; 115 (46.2 overs)	v	Nepal; 118/1 (12.3 overs)
Shiv Mathur 63 (116); Yuvraj Khatri 4/18 (10 overs)		Shahil Patel 42* (41); Shayan Puri 1/35 (5 overs)

Nepal won by 9 wickets
Mulpani Cricket Stadium, Kageshwari-Manohara
Player of the match: Yuvraj Khatri (Nep)

- Nepal won the toss and elected to field.

17 April 2025
09:30
Scorecard

Oman; 133 (44.3 overs)	v	United Arab Emirates; 77/4 (18.5 overs)
Nitish Nadendla 47 (77); Yayin Rai 2/18 (6 overs)		Muhammad Ahmed 20 (24); Jeet Shah 2/17 (7.5 overs)

No result
Mulpani Cricket Stadium, Kageshwari-Manohara

- United Arab Emirates won the toss and elected to field.
- No further play was possible due to rain.

18 April 2025
09:30
Scorecard

Oman; 62 (26.2 overs)	v	Hong Kong; 63/0 (15 overs)
Nitish Nadendla 26 (57); Daniel Mapp 2/5 (4 overs)		Jude Li Thomas 30* (49)

Hong Kong won by 10 wickets
Mulpani International Cricket Ground, Kageshwari-Manohara
Player of the match: Daniel Mapp (HK)

- Oman won the toss and elected to bat.
- The match was reduced to 45 overs due to rain.

19 April 2025
09:30
Scorecard

Hong Kong	v	United Arab Emirates

Match abandoned
Mulpani International Cricket Ground, Kageshwari-Manohara

- No toss.
- No play was possible due to rain.

19 April 2025
09:30
Scorecard

Afghanistan	v	Nepal

Match abandoned
Mulpani Cricket Stadium, Kageshwari-Manohara

- No toss.
- No play was possible due to rain.

== East Asia-Pacific ==
The East Asia-Pacific qualifier had two divisions, with the winner from the Division 2 tournament progressing to the main qualifying tournament.

Division 2	Division 1
Indonesia; Papua New Guinea; Samoa; Vanuatu	Fiji; Japan; Papua New Guinea

=== East Asia-Pacific - Division 2 ===
The following teams took part in the Division 2 tournament, which took place from 6 to 10 August 2024 in Samoa.

- Indonesia
- Papua New Guinea
- Samoa
- Vanuatu

=== Points table ===
Pos	Team	Pld	W	L	Pts	NRR	Qualification
1	Papua New Guinea	3	3	0	6	2.501	Advanced to the final
2	Indonesia	3	2	1	4	0.327	Advanced to the final
3	Samoa	3	1	2	2	0.026	
4	Vanuatu	3	0	3	0	−2.835	

Source: Cricket.com

==== Fixtures ====
6 August 2024
09:30
Scorecard

Samoa; 202 (50 overs)	v	Vanuatu; 50 (16.4 overs)
Damen Pesamino 29 (37); Curran Kendrick 3/36 (9 overs)		Curran Kendrick 17 (20); Joshua McNaughton 4/18 (7 overs)

Samoa won by 152 runs
Faleata Oval, Apia
Player of the match: Joshua McNaughton (Sam)

- Samoa won the toss and elected to bat.

6 August 2024
09:30
Scorecard

Indonesia; 169/7 (50 overs)	v	Papua New Guinea; 171/4 (37.1 overs)
I Gede Wiguna 49 (94); Gaba Frank 4/26 (9 overs)		Gaba Frank 59 (80); Erianto Mangopo 2/55 (9 overs)

Papua New Guinea won by 6 wickets
Faleata Oval, Apia
Player of the match: Gaba Frank (PNG)

- Papua New Guinea won the toss and elected to field.

7 August 2024
09:30
Scorecard

Samoa; 147 (35.1 overs)	v	Indonesia; 148/7 (48.1 overs)
Noah Mead 34 (53); Erianto Mangopo 4/28 (8.1 overs)		I Gede Wiguna 37 (86); Johntoasamoa Falo 2/26 (10 overs)

Indonesia won by 3 wickets
Faleata Oval, Apia
Player of the match: Erianto Mangopo (Idn)

- Samoa won the toss and elected to bat.

7 August 2024
09:30
Scorecard

Vanuatu; 68/8 (25.1 overs)	v	Papua New Guinea; 74/1 (9.3 overs)
Joshia Lental 20 (62); Ware Robin 3/14 (7 overs)		Dauncey Tom 39* (33); Curran Kendrick 1/30 (5 overs)

Papua New Guinea won by 9 wickets
Faleata Oval, Apia
Player of the match: Dauncey Tom (PNG)

- Vanuatu won the toss and elected to bat.

9 August 2024
09:30
Scorecard

Papua New Guinea; 194 (44.3 overs)	v	Samoa; 67 (29.4 overs)
Gaba Frank 50 (51); Arthur Gabriel 4/21 (3.2 overs)		Thomas Pelenato 17 (28); Wallace Nou 4/18 (10 overs)

Papua New Guinea won by 127 runs
Faleata Oval, Apia
Player of the match: Gaba Frank (PNG)

- Papua New Guinea won the toss and elected to bat.

9 August 2024
09:30
Scorecard

Vanuatu; 66 (27.1 overs)	v	Indonesia; 67/7 (24.4 overs)
Joshia Lental 23 (71); Komang Putra 4/18 (7.1 overs)		I Gede Wiguna 17 (35); Curran Kendrick 5/28 (10 overs)

Indonesia won by 3 wickets
Faleata Oval, Apia

- Indonesia won the toss and elected to field.

=== 3rd play-off ===
10 August 2024
09:30
Scorecard

Vanuatu; 44 (15.5 overs)	v	Samoa; 45/6 (10.1 overs)
Joshia Lental 11 (26); Noah Mead 3/9 (3.5 overs)		Thomas Pelenato 9* (14); Gregory Wotu 5/16 (5 overs)

Samoa won by 4 wickets
Faleata Oval, Apia
Player of the match: Gregory Wotu (Van)

- Vanuatu won the toss and elected to bat.

==== The Final ====
10 August 2024
09:30
Scorecard

Papua New Guinea; 330/7 (50 overs)	v	Indonesia; 98 (48.5 overs)
Dauncey Tom 70 (79); Made Rama Yudadiputra 2/24 (3 overs)		Made Rama Yudadiputra 22 (59); Ware Robin 3/8 (10 overs)

Papua New Guinea won by 232 runs
Faleata Oval, Apia
Player of the match: Ware Robin (PNG)

- Indonesia won the toss and elected to field.

=== East Asia-Pacific - Division 1 ===
Fiji and Japan were joined by Papua New Guinea for the Division 1 tournament that took place from 24 to 29 April 2025 in Sano, Japan.

- Fiji
- Japan
- Papua New Guinea

==== Points table ====
Pos	Team	Pld	W	L	T	NR	Pts	NRR	Qualification
1	Japan	4	4	0	0	0	8	2.295	Qualified to the 2026 Under-19 Cricket World Cup
2	Fiji	4	1	3	0	0	2	−0.754	
3	Papua New Guinea	4	1	3	0	0	2	−1.624	

Source: Cricclubs

==== Fixtures ====
24 April 2025
10:00
Scorecard

Japan; 177/8 (35 overs)	v	Papua New Guinea; 71 (22.4 overs)
Nihar Parmar 59 (89); Vagi Vani 3/20 (4 overs)		Rarua Dikana Jnr 19 (39); Nihar Parmar 4/4 (3.4 overs)

Japan won by 106 runs
Sano International Cricket Ground, Sano
Player of the match: Nihar Parmar (Jpn)

- Japan won the toss and elected to bat.
- The match was reduced to 35 overs per side due to rain.

25 April 2025
10:00
Scorecard

Fiji; 54 (18.3 overs)	v	Japan; 57/4 (12.5 overs)
Joeli Moala 18* (17); Charles Hinze 5/20 (7.3 overs)		Charles Hinze 23* (14); Peni Mawi 2/31 (6 overs)

Japan won by 6 wickets
Sano International Cricket Ground, Sano
Player of the match: Charles Hinze (Jpn)

- Fiji won the toss and elected to bat.
- The match was reduced to 40 overs per side due to rain.

26 April 2025
10:00
Scorecard

Fiji; 185 (43.1 overs)	v	Papua New Guinea; 91 (29 overs)
Joeli Moala 46 (50); Anthony David 3/34 (8 overs)		Dauncey Tom 18 (34); Liga Manara 4/31 (10 overs)

Fiji won by 94 runs
Sano International Cricket Ground, Sano
Player of the match: Joeli Moala (Fij)

- Papua New Guinea won the toss and elected to field.

27 April 2025
10:00
Scorecard

Japan; 179/7 (50 overs)	v	Papua New Guinea; 108 (39.3 overs)
Nikhil Pol 40 (53); Vagi Vani 3/27 (10 overs)		Aluend Boge 26* (89); Hugo Tani-Kelly 4/21 (10 overs)

Japan won by 71 runs
Sano International Cricket Ground, Sano
Player of the match: Charles Hinze (Jpn)

- Japan won the toss and elected to bat.

28 April 2025
10:00
Scorecard

Japan; 167 (43 overs)	v	Fiji; 52 (20.5 overs)
Hugo Tani-Kelly 38 (57); Joeli Moala 3/33 (7 overs)		Manav Narayan 20 (35); Charles Hinze 4/13 (7 overs)

Japan won by 115 runs
Sano International Cricket Ground, Sano

- Japan won the toss and elected to bat.

29 April 2025
10:00
Scorecard

Fiji; 108/9 (25 overs)	v	Papua New Guinea; 109/3 (20.5 overs)
Manav Narayan 34 (53); Aluend Boge 2/12 (4 overs)		Gaba Frank 55* (64); Liga Manara 2/14 (5 overs)

Papua New Guinea won by 7 wickets
Sano International Cricket Ground, Sano

- Fiji won the toss and elected to bat.
- The match was reduced to 25 overs due to rain.

== Europe ==
The European qualifier had two divisions, with a minimum of two teams from the Division 2 tournament progressing to the main European qualification tournament.

Division 2		Division 1
Group A	Group B	Division 1
Belgium; Denmark; Italy; Norway	France; Isle of Man; Netherlands; Sweden	Denmark; Guernsey; Jersey; Netherlands; Scotland; Sweden

=== Europe - Division 2 ===
The following teams took part in the Division 2 tournament, which took place from 24 to 30 July 2024 in Denmark.

Group A	Group B
Belgium; Denmark; Italy; Norway	France; Isle of Man; Netherlands; Sweden

==== Group A ====
Pos	Team	Pld	W	L	NR	Pts	NRR	Qualification
1	Denmark	3	3	0	0	6	2.280	Advanced to the semi-finals
2	Italy	3	2	1	0	4	1.573	Advanced to the semi-finals
3	Belgium	3	1	2	0	2	−0.969	
4	Norway	3	0	3	0	0	−3.726	

Source: Cricclubs

==== Fixtures ====
24 July 2024
10:30
Scorecard

Norway; 28 (19 overs)	v	Italy; 30/0 (3.4 overs)
Fasihullah Mohammad Malik 7 (19); Muhammad Asim Munir 4/4 (5 overs)		Luca Di Venuto 19* (14)

Italy won by 10 wickets
Albertslund Cricket Club, Albertslund
Umpires: Andreas Krengel (Den) and James Middlebrook (Eng)
Player of the match: Muhammad Asim Munir (Ita)

- Italy won the toss and elected to field.

24 July 2024
10:30
Scorecard

Denmark; 159 (45.3 overs)	v	Belgium; 117 (37.3 overs)
Saif Ali Alam 38 (62); Muzamil Shinwari 6/18 (8 overs)		Dominic Weinel 24 (32); Nicholas Sonne-Rudd 4/19 (9 overs)

Denmark won by 42 runs
Køge Kricket Klub, Køge
Umpires: George Brolly (Ire) and Srinidhi Ravindra (Fin)
Player of the match: Nicholas Sonne-Rudd (Den)

- Denmark won the toss and elected to bat.

25 July 2024
10:30
Scorecard

Denmark; 343/5 (50 overs)	v	Norway; 50 (22 overs)
Avneet Singh 159* (152); Fasihullah Mohammad Malik 2/49 (10 overs)		Mohammad Nauman Tahir 15 (30); Mustakim Aslam 2/4 (3 overs)

Denmark won by 293 runs
Svanholm Park, Brøndby
Umpires: Stuart Hodgson (Jer) and Ryan Milne (Sco)
Player of the match: Avneet Singh (Den)

- Norway won the toss and elected to field.

25 July 2024
10:30
Scorecard

Belgium; 70 (36.3 overs)	v	Italy; 71/3 (6.2 overs)
Zakir Zadran 21 (65); Muhammad Asim Munir 3/17 (9 overs)		Luca Di Venuto 31 (39); Dominic Weinel 1/17 (4 overs)

Italy won by 7 wickets
Glostrup Cricket Club, Glostrup
Umpires: Andreas Krengel (Den) and Vinay Malhotra (Ger)
Player of the match: Muhammad Asim Munir (Ita)

- Belgium won the toss and elected to bat.

27 July 2024
10:30
Scorecard

Denmark; 116 (36.5 overs)	v	Italy; 109 (46.2 overs)
Isa Ali Malik 36 (59); Shayan Nimhara 4/18 (8.5 overs)		Alex Fernando 22 (46); Mustakim Aslam 4/18 (10 overs)

Denmark won by 7 runs
Glostrup Cricket Club, Glostrup
Umpires: Vinay Malhotra (Ger) and Aidan Seaver (Ire)
Player of the match: Mustakim Aslam (Den)

- Denmark won the toss and elected to bat.

27 July 2024
10:30
Scorecard

Belgium; 186 (34.5 overs)	v	Norway; 172 (48 overs)
Qaim Shah 92 (58); Bilal Popalzai 4/43 (7 overs)		Bilal Popalzai 38 (59); Christopher Weinel 3/33 (8 overs)

Belgium won by 14 runs
Albertslund Cricket Club, Albertslund
Umpires: George Brolly (Ire) and Mike Burns (Eng)
Player of the match: Qaim Shah (Bel)

- Belgium won the toss and elected to bat.

==== Group B ====
Pos	Team	Pld	W	L	NR	Pts	NRR	Qualification
1	Netherlands	3	3	0	0	6	4.539	Advanced to the semi-finals
2	Sweden	3	2	1	0	4	0.545	Advanced to the semi-finals
3	France	3	1	2	0	2	−1.513	
4	Isle of Man	3	0	3	0	0	−2.264	

Source: Cricclubs

==== Fixtures ====
24 July 2024
10:30
Scorecard

Isle of Man; 72 (32.2 overs)	v	Netherlands; 74/2 (13.1 overs)
Joel Williams 17 (27); Shirsak Banerjee 3/10 (6 overs)		Teun Kloppenburg 29* (24); George McAleer 2/23 (6.1 overs)

Netherlands won by 8 wickets
Svanholm Park, Brøndby
Umpires: Mike Burns (Eng) Adnan Malik
Player of the match: Shirsak Banerjee (Ned)

- Netherlands won the toss and elected to field.

24 July 2024
10:30
Scorecard

Sweden; 201 (49.2 overs)	v	France; 52 (21.1 overs)
Kavinshankar Meenakshisundaram 38 (99); Sajad Stanikzay 3/19 (10 overs)		Safkat Zaman 17 (25); Sanuk Keppetiyawe Gedara 5/13 (7 overs)

Sweden won by 149 runs
Glostrup Cricket Club, Glostrup
Umpires: Ryan Milne (Sco) and Maulik Prabhudesai (Ned)
Player of the match: Sanuk Keppetiyawe Gedara (Swe)

- Sweden won the toss and elected to bat.

25 July 2024
10:30
Scorecard

France; 182 (47 overs)	v	Isle of Man; 62 (21.5 overs)
Sajad Stanikzay 52 (64); Hugh Tummon 3/21 (5 overs)		Kyle Gunnion 14 (28); Suhail Mohamad Nazir 5/14 (9 overs)

France won by 120 runs
Albertslund Cricket Club, Albertslund
Umpires: Srinidhi Ravindra (Fin) and Aidan Seaver (Ire)
Player of the match: Sajad Stanikzay (Fra)

- France won the toss and elected to bat.

25 July 2024
10:30
Scorecard

Sweden; 66 (34.5 overs)	v	Netherlands; 68/3 (9 overs)
Ashutosh Samal 21 (71); Cedric De Lange 5/11 (4.5)		Teun Kloppenburg 23* (17); Hasim Nijamudeen 1/17 (2 overs)

Netherlands won by 7 wickets
Køge Kricket Klub, Køge
Umpires: Gareth Morrison (Ire) and James Middlebrook (Eng)
Player of the match: Cedric De Lange (Ned)

- Sweden won the toss and elected to bat.

27 July 2024
10:30
Scorecard

Isle of Man; 172 (48.3)	v	Sweden; 173/3 (36.3)
Ryder Spencer 40 (77); Essa Farooq 3/12 (6 overs)		Yatharth Singh Chauhan 79* (110); Jacob Turner 1/22 (4 overs)

Sweden won by 7 wickets
Svanholm Park, Brøndby
Umpires: Gareth Morrison (Ire) and Adnan Malik
Player of the match: Yatharth Singh Chauhan (Swe)

- Isle of Man won the toss and elected to bat.

27 July 2024
10:30
Scorecard

Netherlands; 302/5 (50 overs)	v	France; 104 (33 overs)
Aaditt Jain 110 (100); Tanbir Aziz 3/46 (10 overs)		Navine Sureshan 24* (74); Alejo Nota 4/18 (6)

Netherlands won by 198 runs
Køge Kricket Klub, Køge
Umpires: Stuart Hodgson (Jer) and Maulik Prabhudesai (Ned)
Player of the match: Aaditt Jain (Ned)

- Netherlands won the toss and elected to bat.

==== Consolation play-offs ====
===== 5th Place semi-finals =====
28 July 2024
10:30
Scorecard

Belgium; 151 (40.4 overs)	v	Isle of Man; 153/8 (42.2 overs)
Qasem Sabir 33 (66); Ryder Spencer 3/17 (7 overs)		Ryder Spencer 57 (113); Qaim Shah 3/28 (10 overs)

Isle of Man won by 2 wickets
Albertslund Cricket Club, Albertslund
Umpires: Stuart Hodgson (Jer) and James Middlebrook (Eng)
Player of the match: Ryder Spencer (IOM)

- Belgium won the toss and elected to bat.

28 July 2024
10:30
Scorecard

France; 139 (38 overs)	v	Norway; 76 (39 overs)
Hussnain Afzal 52 (74); Noor Muhammad 4/21 (4 overs)		Bilal Popalzai 17 (26); Navine Sureshan 4/24 (10 overs)

France won by 63 runs
Køge Kricket Klub, Køge
Umpires: Andreas Krengel (Den) and Aidan Seaver (Ire)
Player of the match: Hussnain Afzal (Fra)

- France won the toss and elected to bat.

===== 7th-place play-off =====
30 July 2024
10:30
Scorecard

Norway; 95 (46.3 overs)	v	Belgium; 96/6 (27 overs)
Fasihullah Mohammad Malik 15 (32); Muzamil Shinwari 3/11 (7.3 overs)		Qaim Shah 28* (24); Afzal Ahmed Ellahi 3/27 (7 overs)

Belgium won by 4 wickets
Køge Kricket Klub, Køge
Umpires: Adnan Malik and Maulik Prabhudesai (Ned)

- Norway won the toss and elected to bat.

===== 5th-place play-off =====
30 July 2024
10:30
Scorecard

France; 269/9 (50 overs)	v	Isle of Man; 83 (29.1 overs)
Tanguy Durrant 70 48(); Ryder Spencer 2/37 (10 overs)		Kyle Gunnion 23 (44); Suhail Mohamad Nazir 4/20 (9 overs)

France won by 186 runs
Albertslund Cricket Club, Albertslund
Umpires: George Brolly (Ire) and Vinay Malhotra (Ger)
Player of the match: Sajad Stanikzay (Fra)

- France won the toss and elected to bat

==== Play-offs ====
===== Semi-finals =====
28 July 2024
10:30
Scorecard

Sweden; 180 (47.5 overs)	v	Denmark; 96 (30.5 overs)
Kavinshankar Meenakshisundaram 50 (112); Ammaar Anwar 2/19 (5 overs)		Saif Ali Alam 17 (35); Advait Dhabe 6/27 (10 overs)

Sweden won by 84 runs
Svanholm Park, Brøndby
Umpires: Mike Burns (Eng) Gareth Morrison (Ire)

- Sweden won the toss and elected to bat.

28 July 2024
10:30
Scorecard

Italy; 52 (28.5 overs)	v	Netherlands; 53/2 (13.3 overs)
Gianluca Longo 10 (22); Sam Van Giezen 3*16 (10 overs)		Shirsak Banerjee 26 (30); Shayan Nimhara 1/13 (5 overs

Netherlands won by 8 wickets
Glostrup Cricket Club, Glostrup
Umpires: Ryan Milne (Sco) and Srinidhi Ravindra (Fin)
Player of the match: Sam Van Giezen (Ned)

- Italy won the toss and elected to bat.

===== 3rd-place play-off =====
30 July 2024
10:30
Scorecard

Denmark; 145 (49.4 overs)	v	Italy; 60 (24 overs)
Saif Ali Alam 33 (94); Sahas Mudunkotuwa 3/16 (10 overs)		Marco Fernando 24 (48); Jabran Khan 4/7 (4 overs)

Denmark won by 85 runs
Glostrup Cricket Club, Glostrup
Umpires: Mike Burns (Eng) and Ryan Milne (Sco)
Player of the match: Jabran Khan (Den)

- Italy won the toss and elected to bowl,

===== Final =====
30 July 2024
10:30
Scorecard

Sweden; 86 (32.5 overs)	v	Netherlands; 87/6 (23 overs)
Sanuk Keppetiyawe Gedara 14 (20); Shirsak Banerjee 3/22 (7 overs)		Aaditt Jain 16 (23); Sanuk Keppetiyawe Gedara 2/17 (4 overs)

Netherlands won by 4 wickets
Svanholm Park, Brøndby
Umpires: Aidan Seaver (Ire) and Gareth Morrison (Ire)
Player of the match: Aaditt Jain (Ned)

- Sweden won the toss and elected to bat

=== Europe - Division 1 ===
Denmark, Netherlands, and Sweden were joined by Guernsey, Jersey, and Scotland for the Division 1 tournament. The following teams took part in the Division 1 tournament, which took place from 31 July to 6 August 2025 in Scotland.

==== Points table ====
Pos	Team	Pld	W	L	Pts	NRR	Qualification
1	Scotland	5	5	0	10	1.119	Qualified to the 2026 Under-19 Cricket World Cup
2	Netherlands	5	4	1	8	2.390	
3	Jersey	5	2	3	4	0.190	
4	Denmark	5	2	3	4	−0.653	
5	Guernsey	5	1	4	2	−0.759	
6	Sweden	5	1	4	2	−1.643	

Source: Cricket Scotland

=== Fixtures ===
31 July 2025
11:00
Scorecard

Jersey; 268/7 (50 overs)	v	Denmark; 155 (36.3 overs)
Jack Kemp 106 (120); Senuja Withanachchi 2/34 (5 overs)		Mustakim Aslam 80 (110); Theo Pullman 3/27 (8.3 overs)

Jersey won by 100 runs (DLS method)
Lochside Park, Forfar
Umpires: Johnny Kennedy (Ire) and Mark Hawthorne (Ire)

- Denmark won the toss and elected to field.
- Second innings was reduced to 45 overs due to rain.
- Denmark were set a revised target of 256 from 45 overs.

31 July 2025
11:00
Scorecard

Sweden; 154 (46.3 overs)	v	Scotland; 163/2 (26.3 overs)
Ashutosh Samal 45 (75); Finlay Jones 5/36 (10 overs)		Manu Saraswat 53* (46); Pranav Yadav 1/23 (3 overs)

Scotland won by 8 wickets (DLS method)
Lochlands Park, Arbroath
Umpires: Martin Saggers (Eng) and Ryan Milne (Sco)

- Scotland won the toss and elected to field.
- Second innings was reduced to 46 overs due to rain.
- Scotland were set a revised target of 160 from 46 overs.

31 July 2025
11:00
Scorecard

Guernsey; 103 (44.3 overs)	v	Netherlands; 72/1 (12.2 overs)
Harry Johnson 25 (45); Aaditt Jain 4/14 (7.3 overs)		Cedric de Lange 43* (39); Harry Johnson 1/20 (4 overs)

Netherlands won by 9 wickets (DLS method)
Forthill, Dundee
Umpires: Nitin Bathi (Ned) and Iain McDonald (Sco)

- Netherlands won the toss and elected to field.
- The match was reduced to 46 overs due to rain.
- Second innings was further reduced to 26 overs due to rain.
- Netherlands were set a revised target of 72 from 26 overs.

1 August 2025
11:00
Scorecard

Denmark; 78 (35.3 overs)	v	Netherlands; 80/1 (18.4 overs)
Mustakim Aslam 28 (55); Alejo Nota 5/17 (10 overs)		Cedric de Lange 38* (52); Mustakim Aslam 1/13 (4 overs)

Netherlands won by 9 wickets
Lochside Park, Forfar
Umpires: Jesper Jensen (Den) and Nitin Bathi (Ned)

- Denmark won the toss and elected to bat.

1 August 2025
11:00
Scorecard

Guernsey; 195 (49.5 overs)	v	Sweden; 196/8 (49.4 overs)
Ed Robinson 35 (66); Advait Dhabe 3/34 (10 overs)		Ashutosh Samal 46 (70); Harry Johnson 3/27 (10 overs)

Sweden won by 2 wickets
Lochlands Park, Arbroath
Umpires: Mark Jameson (Ger) and Johnny Kennedy (Ire)

- Sweden won the toss and elected to field.

1 August 2025
11:00
Scorecard

Jersey; 219/9 (50 overs)	v	Scotland; 222/6 (45.1 overs)
Frederick Harben 49 (66); Manu Saraswat 4/43 (10 overs)		Manu Saraswat 64* (80); Sam Patidar 2/32 (8 overs)

Scotland won by 4 wickets
Forthill, Dundee
Umpires: Maulik Prabhudesai (Ned) and Martin Saggers (Eng)

- Jersey won the toss and elected to bat.

3 August 2025
11:00
Scorecard

Scotland; 280/8 (50 overs)	v	Guernsey; 198 (43.3 overs)
Finlay Carter 57 (60); Charlie Forshaw 3/57 (10 overs)		Charlie Forshaw 43 (47); Jake Woodhouse 3/26 (9 overs)

Scotland won by 82 runs
Lochside Park, Forfar
Umpires: Ryan Milne (Sco) and Maulik Prabhudesai (Ned)

- Scotland won the toss and elected to bat.

3 August 2025
11:00
Scorecard

Jersey; 141 (46.2 overs)	v	Netherlands; 142/3 (24.2 overs)
Alistair Webster 50 (78); Aaditt Jain 3/20 (8.2 overs)		Cedric de Lange 68 (78); James Bradbury 1/24 (3 overs)

Netherlands won by 7 wickets
Lochlands Park, Arbroath
Umpires: Iain McDonald (Sco) and Jesper Jensen (Den)

- Netherlands won the toss and elected to field.

3 August 2025
11:00
Scorecard

Sweden; 137 (41.2 overs)	v	Denmark; 140/7 (44.2 overs)
Ashutosh Samal 29 (66); Jabran Khan 3/22 (9 overs)		Azaan Khan Durrani 27 (32); Hamza Baig 3/26 (10 overs)

Denmark won by 3 wickets
Forthill, Dundee
Umpires: Mark Hawthorne (Ire) and Mark Jameson (Ger)

- Sweden won the toss and elected to bat.

5 August 2025
11:00
Scorecard

Netherlands; 263/8 (50 overs)	v	Sweden; 59 (29.5 overs)
Tom de Leede 74 (88); Sanuk Keppetiyawa 5/60 (10 overs)		Advait Dhabe 13* (36); Thomas McArthur 3/10 (6.5 overs)

Netherlands won by 204 runs
Lochside Park, Forfar
Umpires: Johnny Kennedy (Ire) and Iain McDonald (Sco)

- Netherlands won the toss and elected to bat.
- This match was originally scheduled to be held on 4 August 2025 before being postponed due to storm Floris.

5 August 2025
11:00
Scorecard

Scotland; 292/6 (50 overs)	v	Denmark; 266/6 (50 overs)
Rory Grant 124 (146); Mustakin Aslam 2/59 (9 overs)		Abdul Rafeh 106 (132); Ollie Jones 2/48 (10 overs)

Scotland won by 26 runs
Lochlands Park, Arbroath
Umpires: Martin Saggers (Eng) and Mark Jameson (Ger)

- Scotland won the toss and elected to bat.
- This match was originally scheduled to be held on 4 August 2025 before being postponed due to storm Floris.

5 August 2025
11:00
Scorecard

Jersey; 176 (45.3 overs)	v	Guernsey; 177/6 (47.2 overs)
Benjamin Heelis 47 (66); Freddie Forshaw 3/30 (10 overs)		Charlie Forshaw 63 (85); Theo Pullman 3/29 (9 overs)

Guernsey won by 4 wickets
Forthill, Dundee
Umpires: Nitin Bathi (Ned) and Jesper Jensen (Den)

- Guernsey won the toss and elected to field.
- This match was originally scheduled to be held on 4 August 2025 before being postponed due to storm Floris.

6 August 2025
11:00
Scorecard

Sweden; 117 (41.2 overs)	v	Jersey; 118/5 (30.4 overs)
Abhinav Kumar Ravuri 36 (64); Luke Bosio 3/25 (9.2 overs)		Jack Kemp 37 (53); Yatharth Chauhan 2/17 (5 overs)

Jersey won by 5 wickets
Lochside Park, Forfar
Umpires: Mark Hawthorne (Ire) and Maulik Prabhudesai (Ned)

- Sweden won the toss and elected to bat.

6 August 2025
11:00
Scorecard

Denmark; 219 (48 overs)	v	Guernsey; 184 (45.1 overs)
Senuja Withanachchi 47 (53); Casper Le Ray 5/48 (10 overs)		Ed Robinson 49 (71); Senuja Withanachchi 4/26 (9.1 overs)

Denmark won by 35 runs
Lochlands Park, Arbroath
Umpires: Ryan Milne (Sco) and Iain McDonald (Sco)

- Denmark won the toss and elected to bat.

6 August 2025
11:00
Scorecard

Scotland; 237/8 (50 overs)	v	Netherlands; 217 (47.1 overs)
Olly Pillinger 52 (63); Cedric de Lange 4/29 (9 overs)		Tom de Leede 67 (93); Finlay Jones 4/41 (9.1 overs)

Scotland won by 20 runs
Forthill, Dundee
Umpires: Martin Saggers (Eng) and Johnny Kennedy (Ire)

- Netherlands won the toss and elected to field.
