= Italy national under-19 cricket team =

Personnel
- Captain: Siddiq Rizwan
- Coach: Unknown
- Owner: Italian Cricket Federation (ITF)

History
- List A debut: v. Jersey at Grainville Cricket Ground, St Saviour, Jersey; 22 July 2007

International Cricket Council
- ICC status: Affiliate (1984); Associate member (1995)
- ICC region: European Cricket Council (ECC)

The Italy Under-19 cricket team represents Italy in U-19 international cricket. The team is controlled by Italian Cricket Federation (ICF). The team have not yet qualified for the ICC Under-19 Cricket World Cup.

== History ==
The Italy national under-19 cricket team played their debut game against Jersey on 22 July 2007 at Grainville Cricket Ground, St Saviour, Jersey. Since then the team have been playing qualification round of ICC Under-19 Cricket World Cup but have not qualified yet for the main tournament.

== Current squad ==
The following players have been called up for the 2026 Under-19 Cricket World Cup qualification.

As of 29 April 2025

Name	Date of birth	Batting style	Bowling style
Siddiq Rizwan (Captain)	18 September 2000	Right hand bat	Right arm offbreak
Rohandeep Singh	6 October 2001	Right hand bat	Right arm offbreak
Kashan Mazahar	20 September 2001	Right hand bat/Wicketkeeper	
Pathum Vishvanath	9 March 2001	Right Hand bat	Right arm medium fast
Jaskaran Singh	6 August 2001	Right hand bat	Right arm offbreak
Nabeel Tahir (Vice-Captain)	7 April 2001	Right Hand bat	Right arm medium fast
Sachin Sursh	27 July 2004	Right hand bat	Legbreak
Bharti Bangar	5 January 2002	Left hand bat	Right arm medium fast
Hashir Iftikhar	26 January 2002	Right hand bat	Right arm medium
Adnan Erfan	30 December 2002	Right hand bat	Right arm offbreak
Ehsan Robeel	24 October 2000	Right hand bat	

== Records & statistics ==
International match summary

As of 9 May 2025

Playing records
Format	M	W	L	T	D/NR	Inaugural match
Minor One Day Matches	19	4	14	0	1	22 July 2007

As of 4 October 2024

Records against other national sides
Associate members
Opponent	M	W	L	T	NR	First match	First win
Belgium	2	0	2	0	0	30 July 2016	
France	3	0	3	0	0	27 July 2007	
Germany	2	1	1	0	0	25 July 2007	27 July 2011
Gibraltar	2	1	1	0	0	23 July 2007	29 July 2011
Guernsey	4	0	3	0	1	23 July 2016	
Jersey	1	0	1	0	0	22 July 2007	
Netherlands	2	0	2	0	0	24 July 2016	
Norway	1	0	1	0	0	8 August 2018	
Spain	1	1	0	0	0	28 July 2011	28 July 2011
Sweden	1	1	0	0	0	6 August 2018	6 August 2018

== Tournament summary ==
=== ICC Under-19 Cricket World Cup ===
ICC Under-19 World Cup records
Year	Round	Position	GP	W	L	T	NR
(Australia) 1988	Did not qualify						
(South Africa) 1998	Did not qualify						
(Sri Lanka) 2000	Did not qualify						
(New Zealand) 2002	Did not qualify						
(Bangladesh) 2004	Did not qualify						
(Sri Lanka) 2006	Did not qualify						
(Malaysia) 2008	Did not qualify						
(New Zealand) 2010	Did not qualify						
(Australia) 2012	Did not qualify						
(United Arab Emirates) 2014	Did not qualify						
(Bangladesh) 2016	Did not qualify						
(New Zealand) 2018	Did not qualify						
(South Africa) 2020	Did not qualify						
(Cricket West Indies) 2022	Did not qualify						
(South Africa) 2024	Did not qualify						
(Namibia) (Zimbabwe) 2026	To be determined						
Total	0/15	–	0	0	0	0	0

=== ICC Under-19 Cricket World Cup qualification ===
ICC Under-19 Cricket World Cup qualification records
Year	Round	Position	GP	W	L	T	NR
(Jersey) 2018	DNQ	–	6	0	6	0	0
(England) 2020	DNQ	–	3	1	2	0	0
(Scotland) 2022	The tournament was postponed due to COVID-19 pandemic						
(Guernsey) 2024	DNQ	–	8	3	4	0	1
(Denmark) 2026	DNQ	–	5	2	3	0	0
2028	To be determined						
Total	4/5	–	22	6	15	0	1

=== ICC Europe Under-19 Championship ===
ICC Europe Under-19 Championship records
Year	Round	Position	GP	W	L	T	NR
(Northern Ireland) 1999	The full data of the tournament have been found						
(England) 2000	The full data of the tournament have been found						
(Scotland) 2001	The full data of the tournament have been found						
(England) 2002	The full data of the tournament have been found						
(Netherlands) 2003	The full data of the tournament have been found						
(England) 2004	The full data of the tournament have been found						
(Scotland) 2005	The full data of the tournament have been found						
(Northern Ireland) 2006	The full data of the tournament have been found						
(Northern Ireland) 2007	The full data of the tournament have been found						
(Scotland) 2008	The full data of the tournament have been found						
(Jersey) 2009	The full data of the tournament have been found						
(Scotland) 2010
(Jersey) 2013
(Jersey) 2015	Did not participate						
Total	0/14	–	0	0	0	0	0
