= France national under-19 cricket team =

France

Personnel
- Captain: Kishan Mukundkumar Patel
- Coach: Unknown
- Owner: Association France Cricket (AFC)

History
- List A debut: v. Belgium at Farmers Cricket Club Ground, St Martin, Jersey; 22 July 2007

International Cricket Council
- ICC status: Associate (1998; 28 years ago)
- ICC region: European Cricket Council (ECC)

The France Under-19 cricket team represents the country of France in U-19 international cricket. The team is controlled by Association France Cricket (AFC). The team are yet to qualify for the ICC Under-19 Cricket World Cup.

== History ==
The France national under-19 cricket team played their debut game against Belgium national under-19 cricket team on 22 July 2007 at St Martin, Jersey. Since then the team have been playing qualification round of ICC Under-19 Cricket World Cup but have not qualified yet for the main tournament.

== Current squad ==
The following players are recently called up for the 2026 Under-19 Cricket World Cup qualification.

As of 29 April 2025

Name	Date of birth	Batting style	Bowling style
Kishan Mukundkumar Patel (Captain)	1 December 2001	Right hand bat	Right arm offbreak
Hassan Raza	2 September 2000	Right hand bat	Right arm medium fast
Noman Amjad	30 June 2004	Right hand bat	Right arm medium fast
Faizan Akhtar	14 November 2000	Right Hand bat	Right arm medium
Shayan Iftikhar	6 February 2001	Right hand bat	Legbreak
Zain Ahmad (Vice-Captain)	13 September 2003	Right Hand bat	Legbreak googly
Momtaz Nasseri	30 May 2002	Right hand bat/Wicketkeeper	
Qamar Islam Khan	16 September 2000	Right hand bat	Right arm medium fast
Shahid Oriakhil	9 January 2001	Right hand bat	Right arm medium
Lingeswaran Canessane	18 November 2002	Right hand bat/Wicketkeeper	
Pewaston Sherzad	13 September 2001	Right hand bat	Right arm medium

== Records & statistics ==
International match summary

As of 9 June 2024

Playing records
Format	M	W	L	T	D/NR	Inaugural match
Youth One day Internationals	18	6	12	0	0	22 July 2007

As of 4 October 2024

Records against other national sides
Associate members
Opponent	M	W	L	T	NR	First match	First win
Belgium	2	0	2	0	0	22 July 2007	
Denmark	2	0	2	0	0	29 July 2011	
Germany	1	0	1	0	0	26 July 2007	
Guernsey	2	0	2	0	0	24 July 2007	
Ireland	1	0	1	0	0	1 August 2019	
Israel	1	1	0	0	0	27 July 2011	27 July 2011
Italy	3	3	0	0	0	27 July 2007	27 July 2007
Jersey	1	0	1	0	0	30 July 2019	
Netherlands	2	0	2	0	0	8 August 2018	
Norway	1	1	0	0	0	31 July 2011	31 July 2011
Scotland	1	0	1	0	0	29 July 2019	
Sweden	1	1	0	0	0	3 August 2018	3 August 2018

== Tournament summary ==
=== ICC Under-19 Cricket World Cup ===
ICC Under-19 World Cup records
Year	Round	Position	GP	W	L	T	NR
(Australia) 1988	Did not qualify						
(South Africa) 1998	Did not qualify						
(Sri Lanka) 2000	Did not qualify						
(New Zealand) 2002	Did not qualify						
(Bangladesh) 2004	Did not qualify						
(Sri Lanka) 2006	Did not qualify						
(Malaysia) 2008	Did not qualify						
(New Zealand) 2010	Did not qualify						
(Australia) 2012	Did not qualify						
(United Arab Emirates) 2014	Did not qualify						
(Bangladesh) 2016	Did not qualify						
(New Zealand) 2018	Did not qualify						
(South Africa) 2020	Did not qualify						
(Cricket West Indies) 2022	Did not qualify						
(South Africa) 2024	Did not qualify						
(Namibia) (Zimbabwe) 2026	To be determined						
Total	0/15	–	0	0	0	0	0

=== ICC Under-19 Cricket World Cup qualification ===
ICC Under-19 Cricket World Cup qualification records
Year	Round	Position	GP	W	L	T	NR
(Jersey) 2018	Did not participate						
(England) 2020	DNQ	–	8	2	6	0	0
(Scotland) 2022	The tournament was postponed due to COVID-19 pandemic						
(Guernsey) 2024	DNQ	–	5	0	5	0	0
(Denmark) 2026	DNQ	–	3	1	2	0	0
2028	To be determined						
Total	3/5	–	16	3	13	0	0

=== ICC Europe Under-19 Championship ===
ICC Europe Under-19 Championship records
Year	Round	Position	GP	W	L	T	NR
(Northern Ireland) 1999	The full data of the tournament have been found						
(England) 2000	The full data of the tournament have been found						
(Scotland) 2001	The full data of the tournament have been found						
(England) 2002	The full data of the tournament have been found						
(Netherlands) 2003	The full data of the tournament have been found						
(England) 2004	The full data of the tournament have been found						
(Scotland) 2005	The full data of the tournament have been found						
(Northern Ireland) 2006	The full data of the tournament have been found						
(Northern Ireland) 2007	The full data of the tournament have been found						
(Scotland) 2008	The full data of the tournament have been found						
(Jersey) 2009	The full data of the tournament have been found						
(Scotland) 2010
(Jersey) 2013
(Jersey) 2015	Did not participate						
Total	0/14	–	0	0	0	0	0
