= Sweden national under-19 cricket team =

Personnel
- Captain: Munib Safi
- Coach: Rajan Sharma
- Owner: Swedish Cricket Federation (SCF)

History
- List A debut: v. Guernsey at Cricket Field Lane, Bishop's Stortford, England; 31 July 2018

International Cricket Council
- ICC status: Affiliate (1997); Associate member (2017)
- ICC region: European Cricket Council (ECC)

The Sweden Under-19 cricket team represents Sweden in U-19 international cricket. The team is controlled by Swedish Cricket Federation (SCF). The team have not yet qualified for the ICC Under-19 Cricket World Cup

== History ==
The Sweden national under-19 cricket team played their debut game against Guernsey on 31 July 2018 at Cricket Field Lane, Bishop's Stortford, England. Since then the team have been playing qualification round of ICC Under-19 Cricket World Cup but have not qualified yet for the main tournament.

== Current squad ==
The following players are recently called up for the 2026 Under-19 Cricket World Cup qualification.

As of 29 April 2025

Name	Date of birth	Batting style	Bowling style
Munib Safi (Captain)	1 October 2002	Right hand bat	Right arm offbreak
Akmal Zuwak	6 June 2004	Right hand bat	Right arm offbreak
Muhammad Abdul Rehman	15 November 2000	Right hand bat	
Saad Nawaz	2 May 2002	Left Hand bat	Right arm medium fast
Usman Jabbar	16 April 2004	Right hand bat	Right arm offbreak
Faseeh Choudary (Vice-Captain)	22 February 2002	Right Hand bat	Right arm medium fast
Munir Safi	19 March 2005	Right hand bat	Legbreak
Saad Mohammed	6 October 2002	Left hand bat	Right arm medium fast
Samiallah Khalil	10 November 2003	Right hand bat	Right arm medium
Aritra Bhakat	30 November 2000	Right hand bat Wicketkeeper	
Harris Aziz	27 November 2002	Right hand bat	

== Records & statistics ==
International match summary

As of 9 May 2025

Playing records
Format	M	W	L	T	D/NR	Inaugural match
Minor One Day Matches	4	2	2	0	0	31 July 2018

As of 4 October 2024

Records against other national sides
Associate members
Opponent	M	W	L	T	NR	First match	First win
Belgium	1	1	0	0	0	8 August 2018	8 August 2018
Guernsey	1	1	0	0	0	31 July 2018	31 July 2018
France	1	0	1	0	0	3 August 2018	
Italy	1	0	1	0	0	6 August 2018	

== Tournament summary ==
=== ICC Under-19 Cricket World Cup ===
ICC Under-19 World Cup records
Year	Round	Position	GP	W	L	T	NR
(Australia) 1988	Did not qualify						
(South Africa) 1998	Did not qualify						
(Sri Lanka) 2000	Did not qualify						
(New Zealand) 2002	Did not qualify						
(Bangladesh) 2004	Did not qualify						
(Sri Lanka) 2006	Did not qualify						
(Malaysia) 2008	Did not qualify						
(New Zealand) 2010	Did not qualify						
(Australia) 2012	Did not qualify						
(United Arab Emirates) 2014	Did not qualify						
(Bangladesh) 2016	Did not qualify						
(New Zealand) 2018	Did not qualify						
(South Africa) 2020	Did not qualify						
(Cricket West Indies) 2022	Did not qualify						
(South Africa) 2024	Did not qualify						
(Namibia) (Zimbabwe) 2026	To be determined						
Total	0/15	–	0	0	0	0	0

=== ICC Under-19 Cricket World Cup qualification ===
ICC Under-19 Cricket World Cup qualification records
Year	Round	Position	GP	W	L	T	NR
(Jersey) 2018	DNQ	–	3	1	2	0	0
(England) 2020	DNQ	–	3	2	1	0	0
(Scotland) 2022	The tournament was postponed due to COVID-19 pandemic						
(Guernsey) 2024	DNQ	–	5	0	5	0	0
(Denmark) 2026	To be determined						
2028	To be determined						
Total	3/4	0 Title	11	3	8	0	0

=== ICC Europe Under-19 Championship ===
ICC Europe Under-19 Championship records
Year	Round	Position	GP	W	L	T	NR
(Northern Ireland) 1999	The full data of the tournament have been found						
(England) 2000	The full data of the tournament have been found						
(Scotland) 2001	The full data of the tournament have been found						
(England) 2002	The full data of the tournament have been found						
(Netherlands) 2003	The full data of the tournament have been found						
(England) 2004	The full data of the tournament have been found						
(Scotland) 2005	The full data of the tournament have been found						
(Northern Ireland) 2006	The full data of the tournament have been found						
(Northern Ireland) 2007	The full data of the tournament have been found						
(Scotland) 2008	The full data of the tournament have been found						
(Jersey) 2009	The full data of the tournament have been found						
(Scotland) 2010	The full data of the tournament have been found						
(Jersey) 2013	The full data of the tournament have been found						
(Jersey) 2015	Did not participate						
Total	0/14	–	0	0	0	0	0
