= Lochside Park =

Cricket ground in Forfar, Angus, Scotland

Coordinates: 56°38′31.96″N 02°54′12.22″W

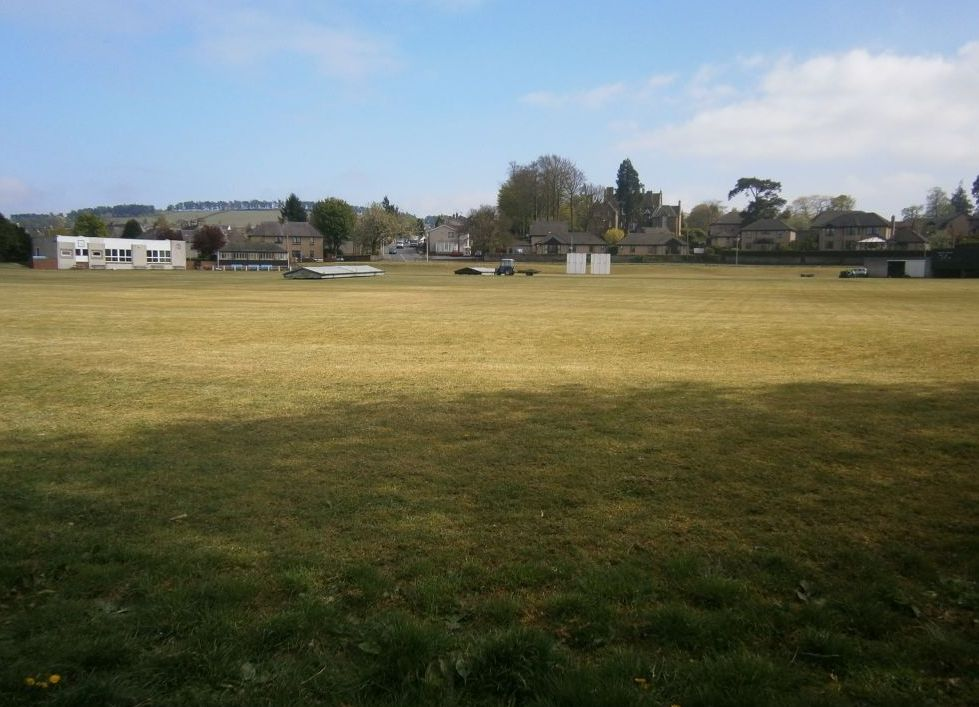
- Interactive map of Lochside Park

Ground information
- Location: Forfar, Scotland
- Country: Scotland
- Establishment: 1873
- End names
- Loch End; Baronhill End

Team information
Scotland	(1991–1998)
- As of 19 October 2011; Source: Ground profile

Lochside Park is a cricket ground in Forfar, Scotland. The ground has been used for cricket since at least 1873. In the latter part of the 20th century the ground was used to host matches for the Scotland national team and its reserve sides, the first of these being in 1984 when Scotland B played Durham University.

The ground held its first List A match when Scotland played Lancashire in the 1991 Benson & Hedges Cup. Five further List A matches were played there, all involving Scotland in the Benson & Hedges Cup. The last match of that type to be held there came in the 1998 Benson & Hedges Cup when Derbyshire were the visitors.

Lochside is still in use today by Strathmore Cricket Club.

== Records ==
=== List A ===
- Highest team total: 235 for 6 (55 overs) by Northamptonshire v Scotland, 1992
- Lowest team total: 106 for 8 (55 overs) by Scotland v Essex, 1993
- Highest individual innings: 103 by Alan Fordham for Northamptonshire v Scotland, 1992
- Best bowling in an innings: 5 for 21 by Mark Ilott for Essex v Scotland, 1993
