= Sierra Leone national under-19 cricket team =

Under-19 cricket team

Sierra Leone Under-19 cricket team
- Association: Cricket Sierra Leone (SLCA)

Personnel
- Captain: Raymond Coker
- Coach: Abass Gbla

History
- List A debut: v. Kenya Kyambogo Cricket Oval Kampala, Uganda; 26 May 2013

International Cricket Council
- ICC status: Associate member (2017); Affiliate member (2002)
- ICC region: Africa Cricket Association (AFA)

The Sierra Leone under-19 cricket team represents Sierra Leone in international under-19 cricket. The team is administered by the Cricket Sierra Leone (SLCA).

== Current squad ==
The following players have been called up for the 2026 Under-19 Cricket World Cup qualification.

As of 5 April 2025

Name	Date of birth	Batting style	Bowling style
George Edward Ngegba (Captain)	12 November 2002	Right hand bat	Right arm offbreak
John Bangura	12 August 2005	Right hand bat	Right arm offbreak
Eric Musa Turay	5 December 2004	Right hand bat	Right arm offbreak
James F Bangura	8 November 2001	Right Hand bat	
Emmanuel Akpo	21 May 2004	Right hand bat	
Osman Thomas Sankoh	18 November 2000	Right Hand bat	Right arm offbreak
Edmond Ernest	14 November 2003	Right hand bat	Right arm medium
Haroun Kamara	4 September 2004	Right hand bat	Right arm offbreak
Chernoh Bah	14 November 2002	Right hand bat	Right arm medium
Aruna Kainessie	27 November 2000	Wicketkeeper/Batter	
Samuel Conteh	21 September 2003	Right hand bat	Right arm medium

== Records & statistics ==
International match summary

As of 7 August 2024

Playing records
Format	M	W	L	T	D/NR	Inaugural match
Youth One Day Internationals	15	7	8	0	0	8 August 2005

Records against other national sides
Associate members
Opponent	M	W	L	T	NR	First match	First win
Botswana	2	1	1	0	0	28 May 2013	22 August 2018
Kenya	2	1	1	0	0	26 May 2013	21 March 2019
Mozambique	1	1	0	0	0	26 August 2018	26 August 2018
Namibia	1	0	1	0	0	20 March 2019	20 March 2019
Nigeria	3	0	3	0	0	27 May 2013	
Rwanda	1	1	0	0	0	23 August 2018	23 August 2018
Swaziland	1	1	0	0	0	25 August 2018	25 August 2018
Tanzania	3	2	1	0	0	30 May 2013	17 March 2019
Uganda	1	0	1	0	0		

== Tournament history ==
=== ICC U19 Cricket World Cup ===
Botswana's U19 World Cup Record
Year	Result	Pos	№	Pld	W	L	T	NR
(Australia) 1988	Did not qualify							
(South Africa) 1998	Did not qualify							
(Sri Lanka) 2000	Did not qualify							
(New Zealand) 2002	Did not qualify							
(Bangladesh) 2004	Did not qualify							
(Sri Lanka) 2006	Did not qualify							
(Malaysia) 2008	Did not qualify							
(New Zealand) 2010	Did not qualify							
(Australia) 2012	Did not qualify							
(United Arab Emirates) 2014	Did not qualify							
(Bangladesh) 2016	Did not qualify							
(New Zealand) 2018	Did not qualify							
(South Africa) 2020	Did not qualify							
(Cricket West Indies) 2022	Did not qualify							
(South Africa) 2024	Did not qualify							
(Zimbabwe) (Namibia) 2026	Did not qualify							
Total	0 Title	0	0	0	0	0	0	0

=== ICC Africa Under-19 Championship ===
ICC Africa Under-19 Championship records
Year	Round	Position	GP	W	L	T	NR
(South Africa) 2007	Did not participate						
(Mozambique) 2009	The full data of the tournament have not been found						
(Namibia) 2010	Round-robin	6/8	7	2	5	0	0
(Uganda) 2013	Group stages	7/8	4	0	4	0	0
(Tanzania) 2015	Did not participate						
Total	2/5	–	11	2	9	0	0

=== ICC Under-19 Cricket World Cup qualification ===
ICC Under-19 Cricket World Cup qualification record
Year	Round	Position	GP	W	L	T	NR
(South Africa) 2018	DNQ	–	12	4	8	0	0
(South Africa) 2020	DNQ	–	5	2	3	0	0
(South Africa) 2022	Did not participate						
(Nigeria) 2024	DNQ	–	5	2	3	0	0
(Tanzania) 2026	DNQ	–	5	0	5	0	0
2028	To be determined						
Total	4/5	–	27	8	19	0	0
