= Tanzania national under-19 cricket team =

Under-19 cricket team

Tanzania Under-19 cricket team
- Association: Tanzania Cricket Association (TCA)

Personnel
- Captain: Laksh Bakrania
- Coach: Imran Nackerdien

History
- List A debut: v. Namibia at Willowmoore Park Benoni, South Africa; 27 August 2007

International Cricket Council
- ICC region: Africa (AFA)

The Tanzania under-19 cricket team represents Tanzania in international under-19 cricket. The team is administered by the Tanzania Cricket Association (TCA).

== History ==
The Tanzania national under-19 cricket team have played their debut game against Namibia on 27 August 2007 at Willowmoore Park Benoni, South Africa. The team qualified for their first ever under-19 World Cup, by making it to the 2026 Under-19 Cricket World Cup which was held in Namibia and Zimbabwe.

== Current squad ==
The following players list were announced recently ended 2024 ICC Under-19 Cricket World Cup qualification.

As of 5 July 2023

Name	Date of birth	Batting style	Bowling style
Dhrumit Mehta (Captain)	21 April 2003	Right hand bat	Right arm Offbreak
Gokul Thulasee Das	29 September 2002	Right hand bat	Left arm Medium fast
Abdallah Juma Jabiri	28 February 2003	Right hand bat	Wicketkeeper
Abduramani Akida Hussein	1 February 2003	Right hand bat	Left arm Medium fast
Karim Rashidi Kiseto	18 September 2006	Right hand bat	Right arm Offbreak
Johnson John Nyambo	30 October 2005	Right hand bat	Right arm Medium fast
Augustino Meya Mwamele	27 December 2006	Right hand bat	Right arm Medium fast
Laksh Snehal Bakrania	29 September 2007	Left hand bat	Slow Left arm Orthodox
Pafurord Anaclet Phabian	13 December 2002	Right hand bat	Right arm Medium fast
Yalinde Maurice Nkanya	22 June 2003	Right hand bat	Slow Left arm Orthodox
Karim Athumani Mnyankindi	4 June 2004	Right hand bat	Right arm Medium fast

== Records & statistics ==
International match summary

As of 9 June 2024

Playing records
Format	M	W	L	T	D/NR	Inaugural match
Youth One day Internationals	24	11	13	0	0	25 August 2007

As of 9 June 2022

Records against other national sides
Associate members
Opponent	M	W	L	T	NR	First match	First win
Botswana	2	2	0	0	0	26 August 2007	26 August 2007
Ghana	1	0	1	0	0	29 August 2007	
Kenya	1	0	1	0	0	20 March 2019	
Mozambique	1	1	0	0	0	28 August 2007	28 August 2018
Namibia	3	1	2	0	0	28 May 2013	1 October 2021
Nigeria	5	3	2	0	0	26 August 2018	30 August 2007
Rwanda	2	2	0	0	0	25 August 2018	25 August 2018
Sierra Leone	3	1	2	0	0	30 May 2013	30 May 2013
Swaziland	1	1	0	0	0	22 August 2018	22 August 2018
Uganda	4	0	4	0	0	25 August 2007	
Zambia	1	0	1	0	0	25 May 2013	

== Competitive records ==
=== ICC Under-19 Cricket World Cup ===
ICC Under-19 World Cup records
Year	Round	Position	GS	W	L	T	NR
(Australia) 1988	Did not qualify						
(South Africa) 1998	Did not qualify						
(Sri Lanka) 2000	Did not qualify						
(New Zealand) 2002	Did not qualify						
(Bangladesh) 2004	Did not qualify						
(Sri Lanka) 2006	Did not qualify						
(Malaysia) 2008	Did not qualify						
(New Zealand) 2010	Did not qualify						
(Australia) 2012	Did not qualify						
(United Arab Emirates) 2014	Did not qualify						
(Bangladesh) 2016	Did not qualify						
(New Zealand) 2018	Did not qualify						
(South Africa) 2020	Did not qualify						
(Cricket West Indies) 2022	Did not qualify						
(South Africa) 2024	Did not qualify						
(Namibia) (Zimbabwe) 2026	Group Stage	16/16	4	0	4	0	0
Total	0/15	0 Title	4	0	4	0	0

=== ICC Africa Under-19 Championship ===
ICC Africa Under-19 Championship records
Year	Round	Position	GP	W	L	T	NR
(South Africa) 2007	The full data of the tournament have not been found						
(Namibia) 2010	Did not participate						
(Uganda) 2013	Group stage	–	4	1	3	0	0
(Tanzania) 2015	Round-robin	–	5	2	3	0	0
Total	2/4	0 Title	9	3	6	0	0

=== ICC Under-19 Cricket World Cup qualification ===
ICC Under-19 Cricket World Cup qualification record
Year	Round	Position	GP	W	L	T	NR
(South Africa) 2018	Division 2	6/7	6	1	5	0	0
(South Africa) 2020	Division 1	6/6	9	3	6	0	0
(South Africa) 2022	The tournament was postponed due to COVID-19 pandemic						
(Tanzania) 2024	Division 1	5/6	5	1	3	0	0
(Nigeria) 2026	Division 1	1/6	8	8	0	0	0
2028	To be determined						
Total	5/5	–	28	13	15	0	0
