= Rydal, Georgia =

- Unincorporated community
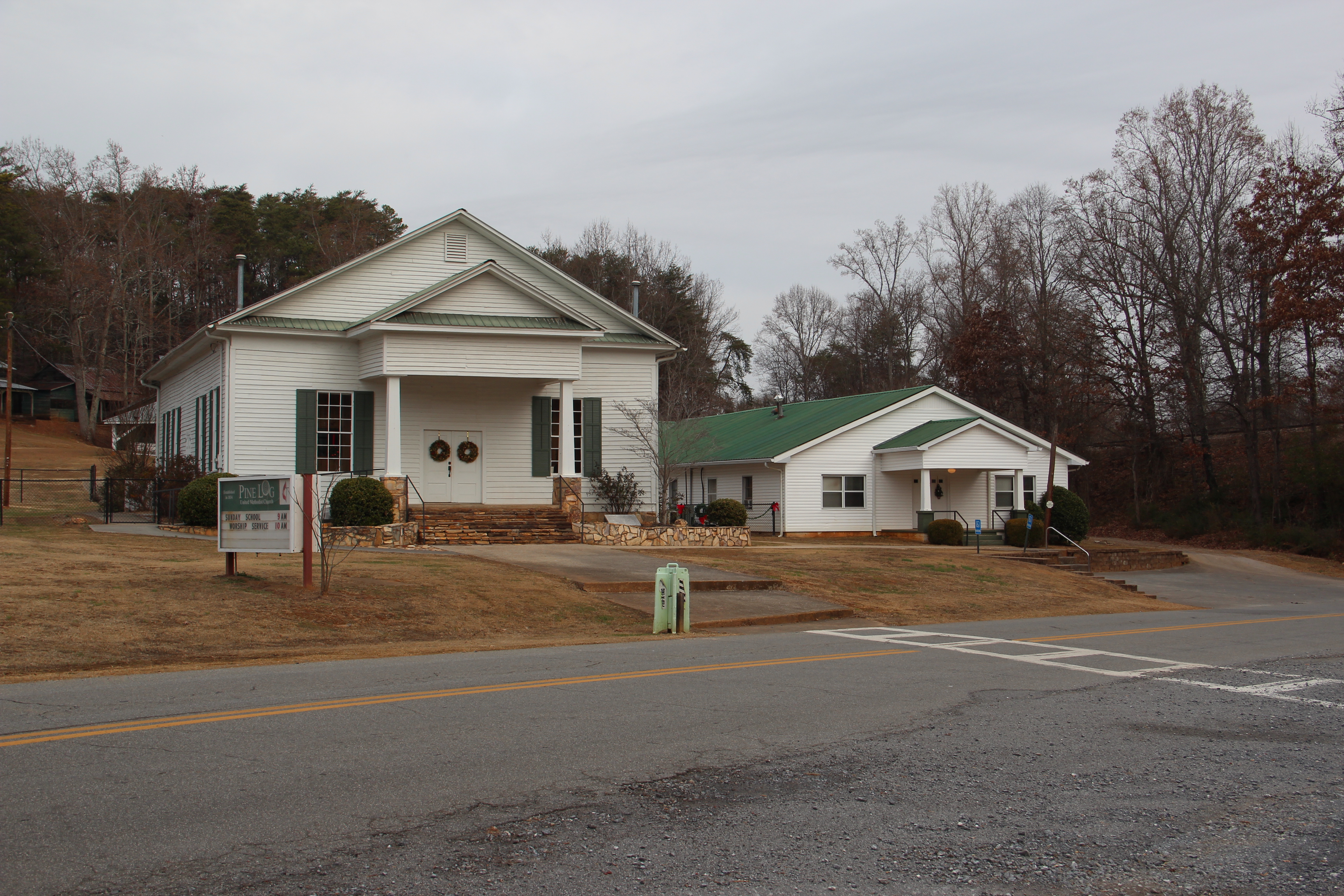
- Pine Log United Methodist Church

- Location within Georgia
- Coordinates: 34°20′07″N 84°42′56″W
- Country: United States
- State: Georgia
- County: Bartow

Area
  - Land: 53.6 sq mi (139 km^{2})
- Elevation: 0.11 ft (0.034 m)

Population (2010 est.)
  - Total: 4,087
  - Density: 76.2/sq mi (29.4/km^{2})
- Time zone: UTC-5 (Eastern (EST))
  - Summer (DST): UTC-4 (EDT)
- ZIP code: 30171
- Area codes: 770/678/470/943
- GNIS feature ID: 332948

Rydal is an unincorporated community in Bartow County, Georgia, United States, located thirteen miles north of Cartersville. This still predominantly rural area includes the historic town of Pine Log. The Rydal post office is open today and the town and the surrounding area is now frequently referred to as Rydal. In 2000 the population of the greater Rydal area was 2,960. Several historic churches, homes and the Pine Log Elementary School still remain in the community. The community has experienced population growth from the continuing expansion of the Atlanta Metropolitan Area. The total number of inhabitants has risen in the past years and, since the 1990s, several subdivisions and factories have been built in the area.

== Community and Surrounding Areas ==
Rydal is conveniently located near Cartersville with quick access to Interstate 75. The location of Rydal offers opportunities for residents to quickly reach Atlanta, Rome, and Chattanooga for employment.

== Notable person ==
- Rick Camp, baseball player.
