= 2015 ICC Europe Under-19 Championship =

2015 Europe Under-19 Championship
- Dates: 11 – 18 July 2015
- Administrator: ICC Europe
- Cricket format: 50-over
- Tournament format: Double round-robin
- Host: Jersey
- Champions: Scotland (7th title)
- Participants: 4
- Matches: 12
- Most runs: (Scotland) Neil Flack (166)
- Most wickets: (Scotland) Haris Aslam (15)

The 2015 ICC Europe Under-19 Championship was an international cricket tournament held in Jersey, from 11 to 18 July 2015. The winner of the tournament, Scotland, qualified directly for the 2016 Under-19 World Cup, while the runner-up, Ireland, will play the other runners-up from regional qualifying tournaments at the 2015 World Cup Qualifier, with the winner of that tournament also qualifying for the World Cup.

== Fixtures ==
Qualified for the 2016 Under-19 World Cup.
Qualified for 2015 Under-19 World Cup Qualifier.

Team	Pld	W	L	T	NR	Pts	NRR
Scotland	6	5	1	0	0	10	+1.036
Ireland	6	5	1	0	0	10	+0.793
Jersey	6	2	4	0	0	4	–0.833
Netherlands	6	0	6	0	0	0	–1.042

11 July
Scorecard

Jersey; 170/9 (50 overs)	v	Ireland; 171/4 (30.5 overs)

Ireland won by 6 wickets
Grainville Cricket Ground, Saint Saviour

11 July
Scorecard

Scotland; 249/8 (50 overs)	v	Netherlands; 150/9 (50 overs)

Scotland won by 99 runs
FB Fields, Saint Clement

- Netherlands won the toss and elected to bowl.

12 July
Scorecard

Scotland; 208/9 (44 overs)	v	Jersey; 161 (39.5 overs)

Scotland won by 47 runs
Grainville Cricket Ground, Saint Saviour

- Jersey won the toss and elected to bowl.

12 July
Scorecard

Ireland; 185/9 (45 overs)	v	Netherlands; 109 (39 overs)

Ireland won by 76 runs
Les Quennevais, Saint Brélade

- Netherlands won the toss and elected to bowl.

14 July
Scorecard

Netherlands; 192 (48.2 overs)	v	Jersey; 195/7 (46.3 overs)

Jersey won by 3 wickets
Grainville Cricket Ground, Saint Saviour

- Netherlands won the toss and elected to bat.

14 July
Scorecard

Scotland; 119 (44.1 overs)	v	Ireland; 120/5 (35 overs)

Ireland won by 5 wickets
FB Fields, Saint Clement

- Ireland won the toss and elected to bowl.

15 July
Scorecard

Scotland; 158 (41.3 overs)	v	Netherlands; 152 (49.3 overs)

Scotland won by 6 runs
Grainville Cricket Ground, Saint Saviour

- Scotland won the toss and elected to bat.

15 July
Scorecard

Jersey; 113 (26.5 overs)	v	Ireland; 117/6 (37.3 overs)

Ireland won by 4 wickets
FB Fields, Saint Clement

- Ireland won the toss and elected to bowl.

17 July
Scorecard

Netherlands; 141/9 (37 overs)	v	Ireland; 135/5 (27.2 overs)

Ireland won by 5 wickets (D/L)
Grainville Cricket Ground, Saint Saviour

- Netherlands won the toss and elected to bat.

17 July
Scorecard

Jersey; 113 (38.3 overs)	v	Scotland; 114/3 (14.4 overs)

Scotland won by 7 wickets (D/L)
Les Quennevais, Saint Brélade

- Scotland won the toss and elected to bowl.

18 July
Scorecard

Scotland; 244 (49 overs)	v	Ireland; 161 (45 overs)

Scotland won by 83 runs
Grainville Cricket Ground, Saint Saviour

- Ireland won the toss and elected to bowl.

18 July
Scorecard

Netherlands; 156 (49.3 overs)	v	Jersey; 158/4 (38.1 overs)

Jersey won by 6 wickets
Les Quennevais, Saint Brélade

- Netherlands won the toss and elected to bat.

== Statistics ==
=== Most runs ===
The top five runscorers are included in this table, ranked by runs scored and then by batting average.

Player	Team	Runs	Inns	Avg	Highest	100s	50s
Neil Flack	Scotland	166	6	33.20	71	0	1
Asad Zulfiqar	Netherlands	154	6	38.50	39	0	0
Jack Tector	Ireland	145	6	29.00	43	0	0
Syed Shah	Scotland	142	6	28.40	50	0	1
Saqib Zulfiqar	Netherlands	142	6	23.67	62	0	1

Source: CricHQ

=== Most wickets ===
The top five wicket takers are listed in this table, ranked by wickets taken and then by bowling average.

Player	Team	Overs	Wkts	Ave	SR	Econ	BBI
Haris Aslam	Scotland	56.0	15	10.67	22.40	2.86	5/29
Gary McClintock	Ireland	46.0	13	13.08	21.23	3.70	3/28
Elliot Miles	Jersey	47.0	13	14.92	21.69	4.13	6/42
Rory Anders	Ireland	44.0	12	11.58	22.00	3.16	4/30
Tom Stanton	Ireland	54.0	11	14.00	29.45	2.85	4/34

Source: CricHQ
