= 2022 Under-19 Cricket World Cup qualification =

Cricket tournament

The 2022 ICC Under-19 Cricket World Cup qualification were a series of regional qualification tournaments to determine the final five places at the 2022 Under-19 Cricket World Cup. Seven tournaments in five regions were scheduled to be played. In March 2021, the International Cricket Council (ICC) announced that due to the COVID-19 pandemic the Division 2 tournament in Asia had been cancelled. The Division 2 tournament in Africa was initially postponed, before it was also cancelled. In August 2021, the ICC also announced that the Americas, Asia, and East Asia-Pacific (EAP) regional qualifiers had all been cancelled due to the COVID-19 pandemic. As a result, Canada, the United Arab Emirates and Papua New Guinea all qualified directly to the 2022 Under-19 Cricket World Cup based on their past performances in the last five regional qualifiers. In the African group, Uganda won the Division 1 tournament to become the final team to qualify. In the European group, Ireland beat Scotland in the regional final to qualify. However, in November 2021, the ICC confirmed that Scotland had replaced New Zealand in the 2022 Under-19 Cricket World Cup, after New Zealand were forced to withdraw due to the extensive mandatory quarantine restrictions placed on the return of minors due to the COVID-19 pandemic.

== Qualified teams ==
Region	Team
Africa	Uganda
Americas	Canada
Asia	United Arab Emirates
EAP	Papua New Guinea
Europe	Ireland

== Africa ==
The Africa qualifier was originally scheduled to have two divisions, with the top two teams from the Division 2 tournament progressing to the main Africa qualification tournament. Division 2 was originally scheduled to take place in June 2021, before being moved back to August 2021 due to the COVID-19 pandemic. However, in June 2021, the Division 2 tournament was cancelled. As a result, Rwanda and Tanzania advanced to the Division 1 tournament based on their past records.

=== Division 2 ===
The following teams were scheduled to take part in the Division 2 tournament in from 7 to 13 August 2021 in Tanzania.

- Botswana
- Kenya
- Mozambique
- Rwanda
- Sierra Leone
- Tanzania

=== Division 1 ===
Five teams took part in the Division 1 tournament. Originally, the tournament was scheduled to take place from 25 September to 1 October 2021 in Nigeria. In July 2021, the Rwanda Cricket Association announced that the ICC had confirmed Rwanda as the host for the tournament, with the matches taking place from 30 September to 6 October 2021. Uganda won the Division 1 regional tournament to qualify.

- Namibia
- Nigeria
- Rwanda
- Tanzania
- Uganda

== Americas ==
The following teams were scheduled to take part in the Americas qualifier from 18 to 25 August 2021 in the United States. However, in August 2021 the ICC announced that the qualifier had been cancelled due to the COVID-19 pandemic. As a result, Canada qualified directly to the 2022 Under-19 Cricket World Cup based on their past performances in the last five regional qualifiers.

- Argentina
- Bermuda
- Canada
- United States

== Asia ==
The Asia qualifier initially had two divisions, with the top two teams from the Division 2 tournament progressing to the main Asia qualification tournament. However, in March 2021, the Division 2 tournament was cancelled, as Thailand were unable to host the matches due to the COVID-19 pandemic. As a result, Oman and Singapore were promoted to Division 1, based on their past records in the competition. However, in August 2021 the ICC announced that the Division 1 tournament had also been cancelled due to the COVID-19 pandemic. As a result, the United Arab Emirates qualified directly to the 2022 Under-19 Cricket World Cup based on their past performances in the last five regional qualifiers.

=== Division 2 ===
The following teams were scheduled to take part in the Division 2 tournament.

- Bhutan
- Hong Kong
- Oman
- Qatar
- Saudi Arabia
- Singapore
- Thailand

=== Division 1 ===
The following teams were scheduled to take part in the Division 1 tournament in the United Arab Emirates in September 2021.

- Malaysia
- Nepal
- United Arab Emirates
- Oman
- Singapore

== EAP ==
The following teams were scheduled to take part in the EAP qualifier from 28 September to 4 October 2021 in Japan. However, in August 2021 the ICC announced that the qualifier had been cancelled due to the COVID-19 pandemic. As a result, Papua New Guinea qualified directly to the 2022 Under-19 Cricket World Cup based on their past performances in the last five regional qualifiers.

- Indonesia
- Japan
- Papua New Guinea
- Vanuatu

== Europe ==
The following teams took part in Europe qualifier. Originally, it was scheduled to take place from 30 July to 5 August 2021 in Scotland. However, it was rescheduled, and took place from 19 to 25 September 2021 at the La Manga Club in Spain due to the COVID-19 pandemic. The relocation of the tournament forced Denmark and Guernsey to withdraw from the tournament. Following the 2021 ICC Women's T20 World Cup Europe Qualifier tournament, questions were raised about the quality of the pitch at La Manga, with the ICC moving the under-19 matches to the Desert Springs Cricket Ground in Almeria. In the final, Ireland beat Scotland to qualify.

- ~~Denmark~~
- ~~Guernsey~~
- Ireland
- Jersey
- Netherlands
- Scotland
