= Netherlands national under-19 cricket team =

Dutch cricket team

Netherlands
- Association: Royal Dutch Cricket Association

Personnel
- Captain: Boris Gorlee
- Coach: Roland Lefebvre
- Fielding coach: Pieter Seelaar

History
- First-class debut: Bermuda Under-19s in 1979 at Toronto Cricket, Skating and Curling Club, Toronto, Ontario, Canada

International Cricket Council
- ICC region: Europe
ODI & T20I kit
- As of 2 June 2025

The Netherlands Under-19 cricket team represents the Netherlands in Under-19 international cricket.

The team has been playing in international youth tournaments since 1975 but have only participated in one U-19 World Cup in 2000. They most recently participated in 2010 European U-19 Championship where they finished fourth, thus missing out on a chance for World Cup qualification.

== Future ==
The team played in the 2011 European U-19 Championship which was a challenge series, involving multiple matches played over a longer period of time.
