= 2020 Under-19 Cricket World Cup qualification =

The 2020 Under-19 Cricket World Cup qualification was an international 50-over cricket tournament played to qualify for 2020 Under-19 Cricket World Cup.

== Qualified teams ==
Region	No. of teams	Matches (Divisions)	Qualified Team
Africa	12	35 (2 Divisions)	Nigeria
Americas	5	10 (1 Division)	Canada
Asia	14	39 (2 Divisions)	United Arab Emirates
East Asia Pacific	5	10 (1 Division)	Japan
Europe	12	35 (2 Divisions)	Scotland

== Africa ==
=== Division 2 ===
It was held in Potchefstroom, South Africa from 19 to 28 August 2018. The top three teams (Nigeria, Sierra Leone and Tanzania) were promoted to Division 1 where they competed with Kenya, Namibia and Uganda.

==== Group A ====
Qualified for ICC Under-19 Cricket World Cup Qualifier Africa Division 2 Semi-finals

Teams	Pld	W	L	T	NR	Pts	NRR
Sierra Leone	4	4	0	0	0	8	+2.323
Tanzania	4	3	1	0	0	6	+1.247
Botswana	4	2	2	0	0	4	+0.426
Rwanda	4	1	3	0	0	2	−0.804
Eswatini	4	0	4	0	0	0	−3.489
Source: ESPNCricinfo

No.	Date	Team 1	Score	Team 2	Score	Venue	Result
Match 1	19 Aug 2018	Tanzania	161 (40.1)	Botswana	134 (41.4)	Senwes Park, Potchefstroom	Tanzania by 27 runs
Match 2	19 Aug 2018	Rwanda	229 (49.4)	Eswatini	127 (33.3)	North West University No 2 Ground, Potchefstroom	Rwanda by 102 runs
Match 3	20 Aug 2018	Botswana	120 (28.2)	Rwanda	101 (37)	South African Defense Force Ground, Potchefstroom	Botswana by 19 runs
Match 4	20 Aug 2018	Tanzania	96 (32.4)	Sierra Leone	97/2 (31.5)	Witrand Cricket Field, Potchefstroom	Sierra Leone by 8 wickets
Match 5	22 Aug 2018	Botswana	140 (38)	Sierra Leone	141/4 (40)	Witrand Cricket Field, Potchefstroom	Sierra Leone by 6 wickets
Match 6	22 Aug 2018	Tanzania	262/5 (50)	Eswatini	99 (41.2)	South African Defense Force Ground, Potchefstroom	Tanzania by 163 runs
Match 7	23 Aug 2018	Eswatini	109 (31)	Botswana	112/3 (12.1)	North West University No 2 Ground, Potchefstroom	Botswana by 7 wickets
Match 8	23 Aug 2018	Rwanda	36 (28.1)	Sierra Leone	37/1 (4.4)	Senwes Park, Potchefstroom	Sierra Leone by 9 wickets
Match 9	25 Aug 2018	Rwanda	134 (40.5)	Tanzania	135/4 (22.1)	Witrand Cricket Field, Potchefstroom	Tanzania by 6 wickets
Match 10	25 Aug 2018	Eswatini	81 (35.3)	Sierra Leone	82/2 (10.5)	Senwes Park, Potchefstroom	Sierra Leone by 8 wickets

==== Group B ====
Qualified for ICC Under-19 Cricket World Cup Qualifier Africa Division 2 Semi-finals

Teams	Pld	W	L	T	NR	Pts	NRR
Nigeria	3	3	0	0	0	6	+5.087
Mozambique	3	2	1	0	0	4	+1.807
Ghana	3	1	2	0	0	2	−0.679
Lesotho	3	0	3	0	0	0	−5.299
Source: ESPNCricinfo

No.	Date	Team 1	Score	Team 2	Score	Venue	Result
Match 1	19 Aug 2018	Nigeria	291 (49.5)	Ghana	26 (14.4)	Absa Puk Oval, Potchefstroom	Nigeria by 265 runs
Match 2	19 Aug 2018	Mozambique	306 (48.2)	Lesotho	61 (16)	Witrand Cricket Field, Potchefstroom	Mozambique by 245 runs
Match 3	20 Aug 2018	Ghana	337/7 (50)	Lesotho	67 (20.2)	Senwes Park, Potchefstroom	Ghana by 270 runs
Match 4	20 Aug 2018	Mozambique	56 (19.2)	Nigeria	58/0 (9.5)	North West University No 2 Ground, Potchefstroom	Nigeria by 10 wickets
Match 5	22 Aug 2018	Ghana	99 (25)	Mozambique	100/4 (21.5)	Senwes Park, Potchefstroom	Mozambique by 6 wickets
Match 6	22 Aug 2018	Lesotho	46 (18.1)	Nigeria	47/1 (6.5)	Absa Puk Oval, Potchefstroom	Nigeria by 9 wickets

==== Semi-finals ====
26 August 2018
Scorecard

Nigeria; 169 (46.2 overs)	v	Tanzania; 134 (43.2 overs)

Nigeria won by 35 runs
Senwes Park, Potchefstroom
Player of the match: Segun Ogundipe (NGR)

- Nigeria qualified for the Africa Division 1 tournament.

26 August 2018
Scorecard

Sierra Leone; 167 (33.5 overs)	v	Mozambique; 96 (44.5 overs)

Sierra Leone won by 71 runs
Absa Puk Oval, Potchefstroom
Player of the match: Frederico Carava (MOZ)

- Sierra Leone qualified for the Africa Division 1 tournament.

==== 3rd-place play-off ====
28 August 2018
Scorecard

Tanzania; 215 (46.2 overs)	v	Mozambique; 140 (41.1 overs)

Tanzania won by 75 runs
North West University No 2 Ground, Potchefstroom
Player of the match: Vieira Tembo (MOZ)

- Tanzania qualified for the Africa Division 1 tournament.

==== Final ====
28 August 2018
Scorecard

Nigeria; 242/9 (50 overs)	v	Sierra Leone; 105 (31 overs)

Nigeria won by 137 runs
Senwes Park, Potchefstroom
Player of the match: Olayinka Olayele (NGR)

=== Division 1 ===
The Africa Division One tournament was played in Windhoek, Namibia from 17 to 23 March 2019. Nigeria won the tournament by winning all five of their matches to qualify through to their first World Cup.

Qualified for 2020 World Cup

Teams	Pld	W	L	T	NR	Pts	NRR
Nigeria	5	5	0	0	0	10	+1.237
Namibia (H)	5	4	1	0	0	8	+2.760
Uganda	5	3	2	0	0	6	+0.581
Sierra Leone	5	2	3	0	0	4	−0.880
Kenya	5	1	4	0	0	2	−1.268
Tanzania	5	0	5	0	0	0	−2.668
Source: ESPNCricinfo

(H) - Host

List of matches

17 March 2019
Scorecard

Nigeria; 129/8 (50 overs)	v	Namibia; 77 (32.3 overs)

Nigeria won by 52 runs
Wanderers Cricket Ground, Windhoek
Player of the match: Sylvester Okpe (NGR)

17 March 2019
Scorecard

Uganda; 206 (46.1 overs)	v	Kenya; 136 (40.3 overs)

Uganda won by 70 runs
Affies Park, Windhoek
Player of the match: Frank Akankwasa (UGA)

17 March 2019
Scorecard

Sierra Leone; 126 (49 overs)	v	Tanzania; 99 (40.5 overs)

Sierra Leone won by 27 runs
United Ground, Windhoek
Player of the match: Chernoh Bah (SLE)

18 March 2019
Scorecard

Uganda; 211/9 (50 overs)	v	Sierra Leone; 136 (39.3 overs)

Uganda won by 75 runs
Wanderers Cricket Ground, Windhoek
Player of the match: Munir Ismail (UGA)

18 March 2019
Scorecard

Namibia; 296/7 (50 overs)	v	Tanzania; 46 (19.1 overs)

Namibia won by 250 runs
Affies Park, Windhoek
Player of the match: Ramon Wilmot (NAM)

18 March 2019
Scorecard

Nigeria; 201/4 (50 overs)	v	Kenya; 143/9 (50 overs)

Nigeria won by 58 runs
United Ground, Windhoek
Player of the match: Olayinka Olayele (NGR)

20 March 2019
Scorecard

Tanzania; 143 (48.5 overs)	v	Kenya; 144/2 (37 overs)

Kenya won by 8 wickets
Wanderers Cricket Ground, Windhoek
Player of the match: Sukhdeep Singh (KEN)

20 March 2019
Scorecard

Nigeria; 110 (48 overs)	v	Uganda; 80 (25.1 overs)

Nigeria won by 30 runs
Affies Park, Windhoek
Player of the match: Mohameed Taiwo (NGR)

20 March 2019
Scorecard

Namibia; 260/8 (50 overs)	v	Sierra Leone; 76 (27.2 overs)

Namibia won by 184 runs
United Ground, Windhoek
Player of the match: Matthew de Gouveia (NAM)

21 March 2019
Scorecard

Nigeria; 211/3 (50 overs)	v	Tanzania; 60 (27.2 overs)

Nigeria won by 151 runs
Wanderers Cricket Ground, Windhoek
Player of the match: Olayinka Olayele (NGR)

21 March 2019
Scorecard

Sierra Leone; 225/7 (50 overs)	v	Kenya; 194 (42.2 overs)

Uganda won by 75 runs
Affies Park, Windhoek
Player of the match: Charles Kargbo (SLE)

21 March 2019
Scorecard

Namibia; 250/5 (50 overs)	v	Uganda; 141 (25.5 overs)

Namibia won by 109 runs
United Ground, Windhoek
Player of the match: Divan la Cock (NAM)

23 March 2019
Scorecard

Namibia; 294/5 (50 overs)	v	Kenya; 96 (39.4 overs)

Namibia won by 198 runs
Wanderers Cricket Ground, Windhoek
Player of the match: Divan la Cock (NAM)

23 March 2019
Scorecard

Sierra Leone; 138 (37.3 overs)	v	Nigeria; 139/8 (44.2 overs)

Nigeria won by 2 wickets
Affies Park, Windhoek
Player of the match: Peter Aho (NGR)

23 March 2019
Scorecard

Tanzania; 144 (48.3 overs)	v	Uganda; 147/2 (12.2 overs)

Uganda won by 8 wickets
United Ground, Windhoek
Player of the match: Zephania Arinaitwe (UGA)

== Americas ==
Held in Maple Leaf Cricket Club in King City near Toronto, Canada from July 8–14, 2019. Canada remained unbeaten in the round robin stage and hence qualified for the 2020 ICC U-19 World Cup.

Qualified for 2020 World Cup

Teams	Pld	W	L	T	NR	Pts	NRR
Canada (H)	4	4	0	0	0	8	+6.514
United States	4	3	1	0	0	6	+2.566
Bermuda	4	2	2	0	0	4	+0.259
Argentina	4	1	3	0	0	2	−2.098
Cayman Islands	4	0	4	0	0	0	−5.253
Source: ESPNCricinfo

(H) – Host

List of matches

8 July 2019
Scorecard

Bermuda; 61 (26.4 overs)	v	Canada; 63/1 (8 overs)

Canada won by 9 wickets
Maple Leaf Cricket Club, King City, Ontario
Player of the match: Muhammad Kamal (CAN)

8 July 2019
Scorecard

Cayman Islands; 29 (15.3 overs)	v	United States; 30/0 (1.4 overs)

United States won by 10 wickets
Maple Leaf Cricket Club, King City, Ontario
Player of the match: Raj Vyas (USA)

9 July 2019
Scorecard

Bermuda; 71 (30 overs)	v	United States; 72/1 (9.3 overs)

United States won by 9 wickets
Maple Leaf Cricket Club, King City, Ontario
Player of the match: Shashank Vittaladevaram (USA)

9 July 2019
Scorecard

Argentina; 33 (21 overs)	v	Canada; 39/3 (4 overs)

Canada won by 7 wickets
Maple Leaf Cricket Club, King City, Ontario
Player of the match: Raqib Shamsudeen (CAN)

11 July 2019
Scorecard

Argentina; 54 (37 overs)	v	United States; 57/2 (4.4 overs)

United States won by 8 wickets
Maple Leaf Cricket Club, King City, Ontario
Player of the match: Sanjay Stanley (USA)

11 July 2019
Scorecard

Cayman Islands; 77 (35.2 overs)	v	Bermuda; 78/3 (15.1 overs)

Bermuda won by 7 wickets
Maple Leaf Cricket Club, King City, Ontario
Player of the match: Tybrae Robinson (BER)

12 July 2019
Scorecard

Canada; 441/5 (50 overs)	v	Cayman Islands; 50 (25.5 overs)

Canada won by 391 runs
Maple Leaf Cricket Club, King City, Ontario
Player of the match: Ashtan Deosammy (CAN)

12 July 2019
Scorecard

Bermuda; 201/9 (50 overs)	v	Argentina; 50 (26 overs)

Bermuda won by 151 runs
Maple Leaf Cricket Club, King City, Ontario
Player of the match: Dalin Richardson (BER)

14 July 2019
Scorecard

Argentina; 233/8 (50 overs)	v	Cayman Islands; 132 (37.5 overs)

Argentina won by 101 runs
Maple Leaf Cricket Club, King City, Ontario
Player of the match: Axel Horwitz (ARG)

14 July 2019
Scorecard

United States; 112 (32.4 overs)	v	Canada; 113/5 (22.1 overs)

Canada won by 5 wickets
Maple Leaf Cricket Club, King City, Ontario
Player of the match: Akhil Kumar (CAN)

== Asia ==
=== Division 2 ===
It was held in Bangkok and Chiang Mai, Thailand from 9–17 December 2018. The finalists Oman and Kuwait were promoted to Division 1 where they competed with United Arab Emirates, Nepal, Malaysia and Singapore.

==== Group A ====
Qualified for ICC Under-19 Cricket World Cup Qualifier Asia Division 2 Semi-finals

Teams	Pld	W	L	T	NR	Pts	NRR
Oman	4	4	0	0	0	8	+1.218
Qatar	4	3	1	0	0	6	+0.529
Saudi Arabia	4	2	2	0	0	4	+0.348
Thailand (H)	4	1	3	0	0	2	−0.711
Bhutan	4	0	4	0	0	0	−1.037
Source: ESPNCricinfo

(H) - Host

No.	Date	Team 1	Score	Team 2	Score	Venue	Result
Match 1	9 Dec 2018	Bhutan	48 (19.3)	Oman	49/2 (11.4)	Asian Institute of Technology Ground, Bangkok	Oman by 8 wickets
Match 2	9 Dec 2018	Saudi Arabia	104 (27.4)	Thailand	53 (18)	Terdthai Cricket Ground, Bangkok	Saudi Arabia by 51 runs
Match 3	10 Dec 2018	Saudi Arabia	97 (28)	Bhutan	54 (29.4)	Terdthai Cricket Ground, Bangkok	Saudi Arabia by 43 runs
Match 4	10 Dec 2018	Thailand	92 (36.2)	Qatar	96/4 (37.4)	Asian Institute of Technology Ground, Bangkok	Qatar by 6 wickets
Match 5	11 Dec 2018	Qatar	59 (25.4)	Oman	60/3 (19.3)	Terdthai Cricket Ground, Bangkok	Oman by 7 wickets
Match 6	12 Dec 2018	Saudi Arabia	104 (41.3)	Oman	105/6 (47.4)	Terdthai Cricket Ground, Bangkok	Oman by 4 wickets
Match 7	12 Dec 2018	Thailand	60 (24.4)	Bhutan	40 (28.3)	Asian Institute of Technology Ground, Bangkok	Thailand by 20 runs
Match 8	13 Dec 2018	Saudi Arabia	131 (48.2)	Qatar	132/3 (38)	Asian Institute of Technology Ground, Bangkok	Qatar by 7 wickets
Match 9	14 Dec 2018	Bhutan	58 (22)	Qatar	62/3 (11.4)	Asian Institute of Technology Ground, Bangkok	Qatar by 7 wickets
Match 10	14 Dec 2018	Thailand	70 (38.1)	Oman	74/4 (23.3)	Terdthai Cricket Ground, Bangkok	Oman by 6 wickets

==== Group B ====
Qualified for ICC Under-19 Cricket World Cup Qualifier Asia Division 2 Semi-finals

Teams	Pld	W	L	T	NR	Pts	NRR
Kuwait	4	3	0	0	1	7	+2.622
Hong Kong	4	3	1	0	0	6	+1.618
Bahrain	4	2	2	0	0	4	−0.195
China	4	0	2	0	2	2	−3.060
Maldives	4	0	3	0	1	1	−2.243
Source: ESPNCricinfo

No.	Date	Team 1	Score	Team 2	Score	Venue	Result
Match 1	9 Dec 2018	Bahrain	173 (44.3)	Maldives	159 (40.2)	Gymkhana Club, Chiang Mai	Bahrain by 14 runs
Match 2	9 Dec 2018	Hong Kong	249 (46.5)	China	67 (23)	Prem Tinsulanonda International School Ground, Chiang Mai	Hong Kong by 182 runs
Match 3	10 Dec 2018	Bahrain	180 (49)	China	56 (24)	Prem Tinsulanonda International School Ground, Chiang Mai	Bahrain by 124 runs
Match 4	10 Dec 2018	Hong Kong	118 (36.2)	Kuwait	120/2 (25.2)	Gymkhana Club, Chiang Mai	Kuwait by 8 wickets
Match 5	11 Dec 2018	Kuwait	302/8 (50)	Maldives	111 (25.4)	Prem Tinsulanonda International School Ground, Chiang Mai	Kuwait by 191 runs
Match 6	12 Dec 2018	Hong Kong	205 (48.3)	Bahrain	109 (37.3)	Gymkhana Club, Chiang Mai	Hong Kong by 96 runs
Match 7	12 Dec 2018	China		Maldives		Prem Tinsulanonda International School Ground, Chiang Mai	Match abandoned
Match 8	13 Dec 2018	China		Kuwait		Prem Tinsulanonda International School Ground, Chiang Mai	Match abandoned
Match 9	14 Dec 2018	Kuwait	184/8 (50)	Bahrain	103 (43)	Gymkhana Club, Chiang Mai	Kuwait by 81 runs
Match 10	14 Dec 2018	Maldives	48 (26.2)	Hong Kong	49/0 (10.5)	Prem Tinsulanonda International School Ground, Chiang Mai	Hong Kong by 10 wickets

==== Semi-finals ====
16 December 2018
Scorecard

Kuwait; 202/6 (50 overs)	v	Qatar; 95 (30.3 overs)

Kuwait won by 107 runs
Terdthai Cricket Ground, Bangkok
Player of the match: Nomaan Sidique (KUW)

- Kuwait qualified for the Asia Division 1 tournament.

16 December 2018
Scorecard

Oman; 130 (46.2 overs)	v	Hong Kong; 100 (35 overs)

Oman won by 30 runs
Asian Institute of Technology Ground, Bangkok
Player of the match: Sanjay Ravindra (OMA)

- Oman qualified for the Asia Division 1 tournament.

==== 3rd-place play-off ====
17 December 2018
Scorecard

Hong Kong; 149 (42.5 overs)	v	Qatar; 66 (24.1 overs)

Hong Kong won by 83 runs
Asian Institute of Technology Ground, Bangkok
Player of the match: Vikas Sharma (HKG)

==== Final ====
17 December 2018
Scorecard

Kuwait; 131 (49.2 overs)	v	Oman; 131/9 (50 overs)

Match tied
Terdthai Cricket Ground, Bangkok
Player of the match: Jandu Hamoud (KUW)

=== Division 1 ===
The Asian Division One tournament was played in Kuala Lumpur, Malaysia from 12 to 18 April 2019 It would be the United Arab Emirates who qualified through to their second World Cup after they won all five of their matches to finish ahead of Nepal.

Qualified for 2020 World Cup

Teams	Pld	W	L	T	NR	Pts	NRR
United Arab Emirates	5	5	0	0	0	10	+2.422
Nepal	5	4	1	0	0	8	+2.948
Kuwait	5	3	2	0	0	6	+0.110
Malaysia (H)	5	1	4	0	0	2	–0.870
Oman	5	1	4	0	0	2	–2.165
Singapore	5	1	4	0	0	2	–2.426
Source: ESPNCricinfo

(H) - Host

List of matches

12 April 2019
Scorecard

Malaysia; 206 (48.4 overs)	v	United Arab Emirates; 208/5 (47.1 overs)

United Arab Emirates won by 5 wickets
Kinrara Academy Oval, Kuala Lumpur
Player of the match: Syed Haider (UAE)

12 April 2019
Scorecard

Oman; 105 (34.2 overs)	v	Kuwait; 106/2 (19.3 overs)

Kuwait won by 8 wickets
Bayuemas Oval, Kuala Lumpur
Player of the match: Meet Bhavsar (KUW)

12 April 2019
Scorecard

Nepal; 282 (46 overs)	v	Singapore; 65 (31 overs)

Nepal won by 217 runs
Selangor Turf Club, Kuala Lumpur
Player of the match: Pawan Sarraf (NEP)

13 April 2019
Scorecard

Nepal; 247 (50 overs)	v	United Arab Emirates; 122/3 (30 overs)

United Arab Emirates won by 1 run (D/L method)
Kinrara Academy Oval, Kuala Lumpur
Player of the match: Hari Chauhan (NEP)

13 April 2019
Scorecard

Singapore; 93 (43.5 overs)	v	Kuwait; 94/2 (22.4 overs)

Kuwait won by 8 wickets
Bayuemas Oval, Kuala Lumpur
Player of the match: Abdul Sadiq (KUW)

13 April 2019
Scorecard

Oman; 211/9 (50 overs)	v	Malaysia; 98/6 (26.1 overs)

Oman won by 46 runs (D/L method)
Selangor Turf Club, Kuala Lumpur
Player of the match: Azam Ali (OMA)

15 April 2019
Scorecard

Oman; 244/9 (50 Overs)	v	Singapore; 179/5 (35.4 Overs)

Singapore won by 5 wickets (D/L method)
Kinrara Academy Oval, Kuala Lumpur
Player of the match: Aman Desai (SIN)

- The target for Singapore was revised to 179 runs from 37 overs.

15 April 2019
Scorecard

Malaysia; 92 (33.5 overs)	v	Nepal; 95/2 (13 Overs)

Nepal won by 8 wickets
Bayuemas Oval, Kuala Lumpur
Player of the match: Pawan Sarraf (NEP)

15 April 2019
Scorecard

Kuwait; 56 (26 overs)	v	United Arab Emirates; 57/3 (8 overs)

United Arab Emirates won by 7 wickets
Selangor Turf Club, Kuala Lumpur
Player of the match: Aryan Lakra (UAE)

16 April 2019
Scorecard

Kuwait; 228/7 (50 Overs)	v	Malaysia; 185 (45 Overs)

Kuwait won by 43 runs
Kinrara Academy Oval, Kuala Lumpur
Player of the match: Meet Bhavsar (KUW)

16 April 2019
Scorecard

Singapore; 134/9 (50 overs)	v	United Arab Emirates; 137/1 (26.2 Overs)

United Arab Emirates won by 9 wickets
Bayuemas Oval, Kuala Lumpur
Player of the match: Aryan Lakra (UAE)

16 April 2019
Scorecard

Nepal; 229 (43.2 overs)	v	Oman; 79 (44.1 overs)

Nepal won 150 runs
Selangor Turf Club, Kuala Lumpur
Player of the match: Rohit Paudel (NEP)

18 April 2019
Scorecard

Kuwait; 157 (49.4 overs)	v	Nepal; 160/2 (28 overs)

Nepal won by 8 wickets
Kinrara Academy Oval, Kuala Lumpur
Player of the match: Rit Gautam (NEP)

18 April 2019
Scorecard

Oman; 105 (43.3 overs)	v	United Arab Emirates; 110/0 (12.1 overs)

United Arab Emirates won by 10 wickets
Bayuemas Oval, Kuala Lumpur
Player of the match: Aryan Lakra (UAE)

18 April 2019
Scorecard

Singapore; 141 (48.1 overs)	v	Malaysia; 142/6 (29.5 overs)

Malaysia won by 4 wickets
Selangor Turf Club, Kuala Lumpur
Player of the match: Aslam Khan (MAS)

== East Asia Pacific ==
The East Asia Pacific qualifier was held in Sano, Japan between 2–8 June 2019. Papua New Guinea and Japan were undefeated going into the final game against each other, but the match was scratched and Japan qualified for its first ever Under-19 World Cup after Cricket PNG suspended ten members of the Papua New Guinea squad due to breaching the team's code of conduct, leaving Papua New Guinea unable to field a team for the match.

Qualified for 2020 World Cup

Teams	Pld	W	L	T	NR	Pts	NRR
Japan (H)	4	4	0	0	0	8	+2.409
Papua New Guinea	4	3	1	0	0	6	+3.195
Vanuatu	4	2	2	0	0	4	+0.157
Samoa	4	1	3	0	0	2	-1.714
Fiji	4	0	4	0	0	0	-2.456
Source: ESPNCricinfo

List of matches

2 June 2019
Scorecard

Japan; 252/9 (50 overs)	v	Samoa; 78 (18.1 overs)

Japan won by 174 runs
Sano International Cricket Ground, Japan
Player of the match: Kazumasa Takahashi (JPN)

2 June 2019
Scorecard

Papua New Guinea; 331/8 (50 overs)	v	Fiji; 101 (34.2 overs)

Papua New Guinea won by 230 runs
Sano International Cricket Ground, Japan
Player of the match: Mavara Hekure (PNG)

3 June 2019
Scorecard

Samoa; 92 (25.1 overs)	v	Fiji; 56 (17.5 overs)

Samoa won by 36 runs
Sano International Cricket Ground, Japan
Player of the match: Sitanisilao Toutai (SAM)

3 June 2019
Scorecard

Japan; 198 (50 overs)	v	Vanuatu; 128 (38.4 overs)

Japan won by 70 runs
Sano International Cricket Ground, Japan
Player of the match: Marcus Thurgate (JPN)

5 June 2019
Scorecard

Vanuatu; 174 (36.5 overs)	v	Fiji; 55 (28.4 overs)

Vanuatu won by 119 runs
Sano International Cricket Ground, Japan
Player of the match: Nono Chillia (VAN)

5 June 2019
Scorecard

Samoa; 109 (38.1 overs)	v	Papua New Guinea; 110/6 (20.3 overs)

Papua New Guinea won by 4 wickets
Sano International Cricket Ground, Japan
Player of the match: Eisa Eka (PNG)

6 June 2019
Scorecard

Papua New Guinea; 177 (32.4 overs)	v	Vanuatu; 80 (26.3 overs)

Papua New Guinea won by 97 runs
Sano International Cricket Ground, Japan
Player of the match: Govea Airi (PNG)

6 June 2019
Scorecard

Fiji; 91 (26.2 overs)	v	Japan; 92/6 (23.3 overs)

Japan won by 4 wickets
Sano International Cricket Ground, Japan
Player of the match: Yugandhar Retharekar (JPN)

8 June 2019
Scorecard

Japan	v	Papua New Guinea

Japan won by walkover
Sano International Cricket Ground, Japan

- The match was scratched and Japan awarded the two points as Papua New Guinea were unable to field a team after ten of their players were suspended for one year for breaching the team's code of conduct.

8 June 2019
Scorecard

Samoa; 56 (16.2 overs)	v	Vanuatu; 57/8 (19.4 overs)

Vanuatu won by 2 wickets
Sano International Cricket Ground, Japan
Player of the match: Edwell Kalfau (VAN)

== Europe ==
=== Division 2 ===
The Europe Division 2 tournament was hosted by England from 31 July – 8 August 2018. The top three teams (Netherlands, France and Denmark) were promoted to Division 1 where they competed with Ireland, Jersey and Scotland.

==== Group A ====
Automatically qualified for ICC Under-19 Cricket World Cup Qualifier Europe Division 1
Possible qualification after the 3rd-place play-off

Teams	Pld	W	L	T	NR	Pts	NRR
France	3	2	1	0	0	4	+1.331
Guernsey	3	2	1	0	0	4	+0.330
Italy	3	1	2	0	0	2	−0.673
Sweden	3	1	2	0	0	2	−0.947
Source: ESPNCricinfo

No.	Date	Team 1	Score	Team 2	Score	Venue	Result
Match 1	31 Jul 2018	Guernsey	118/8 (31)	Sweden	119/8 (31)	Cricket Field Lane, Bishop's Stortford	Sweden by 2 wickets (D/L method)
Match 2	31 Jul 2018	France	213/6 (35)	Italy	124 (24.4)	Cricket Field Lane Pitch 2, Bishop's Stortford	France by 89 runs (D/L method)
Match 3	3 Aug 2018	Italy	202 (48.3)	Guernsey	204/7 (48.1)	Harlow Sportcentre, Harlow	Guernsey by 3 wickets
Match 4	3 Aug 2018	France	226 (48.3)	Sweden	108 (34)	Harlow Town Cricket Club, Harlow	France by 118 runs
Match 5	6 Aug 2018	France	195 (46.3)	Guernsey	196/4 (42.1)	Anglo-American Playing Fields, Saffron Walden	Guernsey by 6 wickets
Match 6	6 Aug 2018	Italy	86 (26.4)	Sweden	79 (19.1)	Felsted School Ground, Dunmow	Italy by 7 runs

==== Group B ====
Automatically qualified for ICC Under-19 Cricket World Cup Qualifier Europe Division 1
Possible qualification after the 3rd-place play-off

Teams	Pld	W	L	T	NR	Pts	NRR
Netherlands	4	4	0	0	0	8	+3.542
Denmark	4	3	1	0	0	6	+1.650
Norway	4	2	2	0	0	4	−0.573
Belgium	4	1	3	0	0	2	-2.038
Spain	4	0	4	0	0	0	-2.689
Source: ESPNCricinfo

No.	Date	Team 1	Score	Team 2	Score	Venue	Result
Match 1	31 Jul 2018	Netherlands	242 (41.4)	Norway	41 (25)	Broxbourne Cricket Club, Broxbourne	Netherlands by 201 runs (D/L method)
Match 2	31 Jul 2018	Spain	115 (30)	Belgium	116/5 (33.5)	Harlow Sportcentre, Harlow	Belgium by 5 wickets
Match 3	1 Aug 2018	Spain	187 (45.4)	Norway	190/7 (33.4)	Harlow Sportcentre, Harlow	Norway by 3 wickets
Match 4	1 Aug 2018	Netherlands	251/8 (50)	Denmark	197 (45.3)	St. Margaretsbury Cricket Club, Ware	Netherlands by 54 runs
Match 5	3 Aug 2018	Netherlands	257/5 (50)	Spain	63 (26.5)	Cricket Field Lane, Bishop's Stortford	Netherlands by 194 runs
Match 6	3 Aug 2018	Belgium	112 (48.2)	Denmark	116/4 (18)	Loughton Cricket Club, Loughton	Denmark by 6 wickets
Match 7	5 Aug 2018	Norway	176 (47.3)	Denmark	178/8 (40.4)	Cricket Field Lane, Bishop's Stortford	Denmark by 2 wickets
Match 8	5 Aug 2018	Netherlands	278/6 (50)	Belgium	47 (20.4)	Harlow Town Cricket Club, Harlow	Netherlands by 231 runs
Match 9	6 Aug 2018	Norway	252 (49.1)	Belgium	183/9 (50)	St. Margaretsbury Cricket Club, Ware	Norway by 69 runs
Match 10	6 Aug 2018	Denmark	292 (50)	Spain	118 (29.2)	St. Margaretsbury Cricket Club, Ware	Denmark by 174 runs

==== 7th-place play-off ====
8 August 2018
Scorecard

Belgium; 126 (46.2 overs)	v	Sweden; 127/6 (47.4 overs)

Sweden won by 4 wickets
Hare Field, Coggeshall

==== 5th-place play-off ====
8 August 2018
Scorecard

Norway; 240 (48.2 overs)	v	Italy; 94 (23 overs)

Norway won by 146 runs
Broxbourne Cricket Club, Broxbourne

==== 3rd-place play-off ====
8 August 2018
Scorecard

Denmark; 230/9 (50 overs)	v	Guernsey; 132 (40.3 overs)

Denmark won by 98 runs
Felsted School Ground, Dunmow

- Denmark qualified for the Europe Division 1 tournament.

==== Final ====
8 August 2018
Scorecard

Netherlands; 281/6 (50 overs)	v	France; 127 (40.5 overs)

Netherlands won by 154 runs
Anglo-American Playing Fields, Saffron Walden

=== Division 1 ===
The Division 1 was held in the Netherlands from 26 July to 1 August 2019.

Qualified for 2020 World Cup

Teams	Pld	W	L	T	NR	Pts	NRR
Scotland	5	5	0	0	0	10	+2.327
Ireland	5	4	1	0	0	8	+1.860
Jersey	5	3	2	0	0	6	–0.073
Netherlands (H)	5	2	3	0	0	4	+0.762
Denmark	5	1	4	0	0	2	–1.632
France	5	0	5	0	0	0	–3.533
Source: ESPNCricinfo

(H) - Host

List of matches

26 July 2019
Scorecard

Denmark; 259 (50 overs)	v	France; 192/8 (50 overs)

Denmark won by 67 runs
Sportpark Thurlede, Schiedam
Player of the match: Musa Shaheen (DEN)

26 July 2019
Scorecard

Ireland; 219/9 (50 overs)	v	Jersey; 106 (34.1 overs)

Ireland won by 113 runs
Sportpark Westvliet, Voorburg
Player of the match: Jamie Forbes (IRE)

26 July 2019
Scorecard

Netherlands; 186 (43.3 overs)	v	Scotland; 187/7 (46.4 overs)

Scotland won by 3 wickets
Hazelaarweg, Rotterdam
Player of the match: Tomas Mackintosh (SCO)

27 July 2019
Scorecard

Ireland; 278/6 (50 overs)	v	Denmark; 146 (43.5 overs)

Ireland won by 132 runs
Hazelaarweg, Rotterdam
Player of the match: Nathan McGuire (IRE)

27 July 2019
Scorecard

Scotland; 233/6 (50 overs)	v	Jersey; 111 (36.2 overs)

Scotland won by 122 runs
Sportpark Thurlede, Schiedam
Player of the match: Charlie Peet (SCO)

27 July 2019
Scorecard

Netherlands; 266/7 (50 overs)	v	France; 60 (28.5 overs)

Netherlands won by 206 runs
Sportpark Westvliet, Voorburg
Player of the match: Vikramjit Singh (NED)

29 July 2019
Scorecard

Jersey; 233/9 (50 overs)	v	Denmark; 103 (28.5 overs)

Jersey won by 130 runs
Sportpark Westvliet, Voorburg
Player of the match: Julius Sumerauer (JEY)

29 July 2019
Scorecard

Scotland; 348/4 (50 overs)	v	France; 95 (31.4 overs)

Scotland won by 253 runs
VRA Cricket Ground, Amstelveen
Player of the match: Angus Guy (SCO)

29 July 2019
Scorecard

Ireland; 213/8 (50 overs)	v	Netherlands; 144 (44 overs)

Ireland won by 69 runs
Sportpark Thurlede, Schiedam
Player of the match: James Hunter (IRE)

30 July 2019
Scorecard

France; 183 (49.1 overs)	v	Jersey; 187/1 (32.3 overs)

Jersey won by 9 wickets
VRA Cricket Ground, Amstelveen
Player of the match: Harrison Carlyon (JEY)

30 July 2019
Scorecard

Scotland; 246/6 (50 overs)	v	Ireland; 199 (48.1 overs)

Scotland won by 47 runs
Sportpark Westvliet, Voorburg
Player of the match: Tomas Mackintosh (SCO)

30 July 2019
Scorecard

Netherlands; 263/5 (50 overs)	v	Denmark; 192/9 (50 overs)

Netherlands won by 71 runs
Sportpark Thurlede, Schiedam
Player of the match: Boris Gorlee (NED)

1 August 2019
Scorecard

Scotland; 230/7 (50 overs)	v	Denmark; 88 (24.5 overs)

Scotland won by 142 runs
Sportpark Westvliet, Voorburg
Player of the match: Syed Shah (SCO)

1 August 2019
Scorecard

France; 75 (28.4 overs)	v	Ireland; 76/5 (8.2 overs)

Ireland won by 5 wickets
Sportpark Thurlede, Schiedam
Player of the match: Mitchell Thompson (IRE)

1 August 2019
Scorecard

Netherlands; 125/9 (31 overs)	v	Jersey; 128/2 (26.2 overs)

Jersey won by 8 wickets
VRA Cricket Ground, Amstelveen

- Match was reduced to 31 overs per side due to rain.
