= 2009 ICC Africa Under-19 Championships =

The 2009 ICC Africa Under-19 Championships were a series of two events that served as qualification for the 2009 ICC Under-19 Cricket World Cup Qualifier. The first stage of the championship saw the affiliate nations competing for a place in the finals. This competition was held from 27 February to 5 March in Maputo, Mozambique. Initially it was intended for two teams to go through but due to concern over Kenya's ability, they were included in the qualifying finals limiting the free spaces to one. As a result, only the champions, Sierra Leone, made it through into the eight team finals.

The finals were held from 27 April to 4 May in Lusaka, Zambia. The top two teams qualified for the international qualifier and these were Uganda and surprisingly, the affiliate team of Sierra Leone.

== Africa Under-19 World Cup Qualifier Affiliates ==
=== Teams ===
Six African affiliate nations participated in this competition and these were:

- Gambia
- Ghana
- Mozambique
- Rwanda
- Sierra Leone
- Swaziland

=== Matches ===
The teams played each other in a round robin format with the final placings being decided by wins and then run rate.

=== Final Table ===
Pos.	Team
1	Sierra Leone
2	Ghana
3	Swaziland
4	Mozambique
5	Rwanda
6	Gambia

== Africa Under-19 World Cup Qualifier Finals ==
=== Teams ===
Eight teams competed in the second part of the competition, these being the seven associate nations plus the winners of the affiliate tournament.

Associate nations:

- Botswana
- Kenya
- Namibia
- Nigeria
- Tanzania
- Uganda
- Zambia

Qualified via affiliate tournament:

- Sierra Leone

=== Matches ===
The teams played one another in a round robin format with the final placings being decided by wins and then net run rate.

=== Final Table ===
Pos.	Team	Result
1	Uganda	Promoted to U19 World Cup Qualifiers
2	Sierra Leone	Promoted to U19 World Cup Qualifiers
3	Namibia	
4	Zambia	
5	Kenya	
6	Botswana	
7	Tanzania	
8	Nigeria	
