= 2024 Under-19 Cricket World Cup qualification =

Cricket tournament

2024 ICC U19 Cricket World Cup qualification
- Dates: 5 August 2022 – 18 August 2023
- Administrators: International Cricket Council; Africa Cricket Association; Asian Cricket Council; ICC Americas; ICC East Asia-Pacific; ICC Europe
- Cricket format: 50 Over U19
- Participants: 43

The 2024 Under-19 Cricket World Cup qualification was a series of regional qualification tournaments to determine the final five places at the 2024 Under-19 Cricket World Cup. Nepal became the first team to Qualify for Under-19 World Cup through the Qualifiers.

== Qualified teams ==
Region	Team
Africa	Namibia
Americas	United States
Asia	Nepal
EAP	New Zealand
Europe	Scotland

== Africa ==
The African qualifier had two divisions, with the top three teams from the Division 2 tournament progressing to the main Africa qualification tournament.

=== Africa - Division 2 ===
The following teams were scheduled to take part in the Division 2 tournament from 30 September to 8 October 2022 in Nigeria. Ghana and Mozambique did not participate because of a lack of travel documents.

Group A	Group B
~~Ghana~~ (Note: Did not arrive due to a lack of travel documents.); Kenya; Malawi; ~~Mozambique~~	Botswana; Nigeria; Rwanda; Sierra Leone

==== Group A ====
Pos	Team	Pld	W	L	NR	Pts	NRR	
1	Kenya	3	3	0	0	6	7.150	Advanced to the semi-finals
2	Malawi	3	2	1	0	4	−7.150	Advanced to the semi-finals
3	~~Ghana~~	3	0	3	0	0	—	
4	~~Mozambique~~	3	0	3	0	0	—	

No.	Date	Team 1	Score	Team 2	Score	Venue	Result
Match 1	30 September 2022	Kenya	346/8 (45/45)	Malawi	31 (14.5/40)	Abuja Cricket Stadium (Pitch 1), Abuja	Kenya won by 286 runs (DLS method)
Match 3	1 October 2022	Kenya		Ghana		Abuja Cricket Stadium (Pitch 2), Abuja	Match Forfeited. Kenya win without a ball bowled.
Match 6	2 October 2022	Malawi		Mozambique		Abuja Cricket Stadium (Pitch 2), Abuja	Match Forfeited. Malawi win without a ball bowled.
Match 7	3 October 2022	Ghana		Mozambique		Abuja Cricket Stadium (Pitch 1), Abuja	Match Abandoned without a ball bowled.
Match 11	5 October 2022	Ghana		Malawi		Abuja Cricket Stadium (Pitch 1), Abuja	Match Forfeited. Malawi win without a ball bowled.
Match 12	5 October 2022	Mozambique		Kenya		Abuja Cricket Stadium (Pitch 2), Abuja	Match Forfeited. Kenya win without a ball bowled.

==== Group B ====
Pos	Team	Pld	W	L	NR	Pts	NRR	
1	Nigeria	3	3	0	0	6	2.121	Advanced to the semi-finals
2	Sierra Leone	3	2	1	0	4	1.646	Advanced to the semi-finals
3	Rwanda	3	1	2	0	2	−1.022	
4	Botswana	3	0	3	0	0	−2.397	

No.	Date	Team 1	Score	Team 2	Score	Venue	Result
Match 2	30 September 2022	Rwanda	41 (24.3/36)	Nigeria	42/0 (8.2/36)	Abuja Cricket Stadium (Pitch 2), Abuja	Nigeria won by 10 wickets
Match 4	1 October 2022	Rwanda	55 (23.4)	Sierra Leone	58/4 (18.4)	Abuja Cricket Stadium (Pitch 2), Abuja	Sierra Leone won by 6 wickets
Match 5	2 October 2022	Botswana	56 (24.2)	Nigeria	58/0 (10.5)	Abuja Cricket Stadium (Pitch 1), Abuja	Nigeria won by 10 wickets
Match 8	3 October 2022	Botswana	66 (23.2)	Sierra Leone	67/2 12.2	Abuja Cricket Stadium (Pitch 1), Abuja	Sierra Leone won by 8 wickets
Match 9	4 October 2022	Nigeria	184 (47.4)	Sierra Leone	173 (41.5)	Abuja Cricket Stadium (Pitch 1), Abuja	Nigeria won by 11 runs
Match 11	5 October 2022	Botswana	94 (28.2/47)	Rwanda	96/4 (34/47)	Abuja Cricket Stadium (Pitch 2), Abuja	Rwanda won by 6 wickets

==== Play-offs ====
===== Semi-finals =====
7 October 2022
10:00
Scorecard

Kenya; 153 (48.5)	v	Sierra Leone; 72 (25.2)
Brain Ihaji 29 (55); Raymond Coker 2/24 (9.5 overs)		John Bangura 21 (27); Vishil Patel 6/12 (9.2 overs)

Kenya won by 81 runs
Abuja Cricket Stadium (Pitch 1), Abuja
Umpires: Habib Enesi, Kehinde Olanbiwonnu and Andrew Louw

- Kenya won the toss and elected to bat.

7 October 2022
10:00
Scorecard

Nigeria; 258/9 (49)	v	Malawi; 33 (12.5)
Izuchukwu Okeke 84 (98); Bright Balala 4/26 (9 overs)		Prince Kamanga 17 (12); Ridwan Kareem 6/20 (4.5)

Nigeria won by 225 runs
Abuja Cricket Stadium (Pitch 2), Abuja
Umpires: David Odhiambo and Isaac Oyieko

- Nigeria won the toss and elected to bat.
- The match was reduced to 49 overs per side.

===== 3rd-place play-off =====
8 October 2022
10:00
Scorecard

Sierra Leone	v	Malawi

Match Abandoned
Abuja Cricket Stadium (Pitch 2), Abuja
Umpires: Habib Enesi and David Odhiambo

- Match Abandoned without a ball bowled.

===== Final =====
8 October 2022
10:00
Scorecard

Kenya; 90 (35)	v	Nigeria; 79 (20.4)
Raj Manji 30 (81); Chijioke Okeke 4/10 (8 overs)		Prosper Useni 33 (22); Aaranv Patel 5/29 (7.4 overs)

Kenya won by 11 runs
Abuja Cricket Stadium (Pitch 1), Abuja
Umpires: Iknow Chabi, Andrew Louw and Mahinda Pethiyagoda

- Kenya won the toss and elected to bat.
- The match was reduced to 40 overs per side.

=== Africa - Division 1 ===
Three teams and the top three teams from the Division 2 tournament took part in the Division 1 qualifier in Tanzania from 23 to 29 July 2023.

- Kenya
- Namibia
- Nigeria
- Sierra Leone
- Tanzania
- Uganda

=== Points Table ===
Pos	Team	Pld	W	L	T	NR	Pts	NRR	
1	Namibia	5	4	0	0	1	9	1.749	Advanced to 2024 World Cup
2	Kenya	5	3	1	0	1	7	0.013	
3	Uganda	5	2	2	0	1	5	0.348	
4	Sierra Leone	5	2	3	0	0	4	−0.697	
5	Tanzania	5	1	3	0	1	3	−0.472	
6	Nigeria	5	1	4	0	0	2	−0.606	

Updated to match(es) played on unknown. Source: Cricclubs

=== Fixtures ===
23 July 2023
9:30
Scorecard

Tanzania; 40/2 (14.4 overs)	v	Kenya
Baraka Robert Laiza 9 (18); Vaibhav Naresh 2/9 (4.4 overs)

No result
University of Dar es Salaam Ground, Dar es Salaam, Tanzania
Umpires: Patric Makumbi (Uga) Claus Schumacher (Nam)

- Kenya won the toss and elected to field.
- No further play was possible due to rain.

23 July 2023
9:30
Scorecard

Namibia; 25/0 (7 overs)	v	Uganda
Gerhard Johannes Janse Van Rensburg 20* (30)

No result
Gymkhana Club Ground, Dar es Salaam, Tanzania
Umpires: Lauren Agenbag (SA) and Langton Rusere (Zim)

- Uganda won the toss and elected to field.
- No further play was possible due to rain.

24 July 2023
9:30
Scorecard

Nigeria; 73 (27 overs)	v	Sierra Leone; 74/1 (17.5 overs)
Paul Pam 22 (45); George Sesay 4/15 (7 overs)		Alusine Turay 38* (51); Ridwan Abdulkareem 1/20 (3.5 overs)

Sierra Leone won by 9 wickets
University of Dar es Salaam Ground, Dar es Salaam, Tanzania
Player of the match: Raymond Coker (SLE)

- Sierra Leone won the toss and elected to field.

24 July 2023
9:30
Scorecard

Namibia; 139 (50 overs)	v	Tanzania; 33 (19 overs)
Alexander Büsing-Volschenk 39 (49); Shaik Basha 3/5 (10 overs)		Johnson Nyambo 11 (33); Jack Thomas Brassell 3/6 (5 overs)

Namibia won by 106 runs
Gymkhana Club Ground, Dar es Salaam, Tanzania
Player of the match: Jack Thomas Brassell (Nam)

- Namibia won the toss and elected to bat.

25 July 2023
9:30
Scorecard

Sierra Leone; 139 (46.5 overs)	v	Kenya; 141/6 (40.2 overs)
John Bangura 51 (106); Vishil Patel 4/31 (10 overs)		Brian Likavu 40 (62); James Bangura 2/11 (5 overs)

Kenya won by 4 wickets
Gymkhana Club Ground, Dar es Salaam, Tanzania

- Sierra Leone won the toss and elected to bat.

25 July 2023
9:30
Scorecard

Uganda; 69 (28 overs)	v	Nigeria; 39 (18 overs)
Pius Oloka 17 (32); Emmanuel Udekwe 4/22 (8 overs)		Chijioke Okeke 14 (25); Musa Majid Ramathan 3/7 (4 overs)

Uganda won by 30 runs
University of Dar es Salaam Ground, Dar es Salaam, Tanzania
Umpires: Lauren Agenbag (SA) and David Odhiambo (Ken)

- Uganda who the toss and elected to bat.

26 July 2023
9:30
Scorecard

Kenya; 64 (30.1 overs)	v	Namibia; 67/3 (16.4 overs)
Stian Smith 21 (60); Morris Gerhardt Kariata 3/10 (5 overs)		Alexander Busing-Volschenk 19 (11); Hitendra Sanghani 1/11 (3 overs)

Namibia won by 7 wickets
University of Dar es Salaam Ground, Dar es Salaam, Tanzania

- Kenya won the toss and elected to bat.

26 July 2023
9:30
Scorecard

Tanzania; 48 (25.5 overs)	v	Uganda; 49/7 (17.4 overs)
Augustine Mwamele 13 (34); Joseph Baguma 6/15 (8.5 overs)		Ronald Omara 15 (34); Hamza Ally Onai 3/4 (3.4 overs)

Uganda won by 3 wickets
Gymkhana Club Ground, Dar es Salaam, Tanzania

- Uganda won the toss and elected to field.

27 July 2023
9:30
Scorecard

Nigeria; 149 (47.4 overs)	v	Tanzania; 107 (48.1 overs)
Solomon Chilemanya 66* (80); Augustine Mwamele 4/28 (10 overs)		Augustine Mwamele 19 (37); Chijoke Okeke 3/23 (10 overs)

Nigeria won by 42 runs
Gymkhana Club Ground, Dar es Salaam, Tanzania
Umpires: David Odhiambo (Ken) and Claus Schumacher (Nam)
Player of the match: Solomon Chilemanya (Nga)

- Nigeria won the toss and elected to bat.

27 July 2023
9:30
Scorecard

Namibia; 170 (48 overs)	v	Sierra Leone; 87 (25.2 overs)
Jack Thomas Brassell 41* (85); Ibrahim Sesay 3/20 (8 overs)		James Bangura 16* (9); Morris Gerhardt Kariata 4/16 (6 overs)

Namibia won by 83 runs
University of Dar es Salaam Ground, Dar es Salaam, Tanzania
Umpires: Adil Kassam (Tan) and Rockie D'Mello (ken)
Player of the match: Jack Thomas Brassell (Nam)

- Sierra Leone won the toss and elected to field.

28 July 2023
9:30
Scorecard

Kenya; 79 (41.5 overs)	v	Uganda; 55 (31.2 overs)
Darsh Panchani 40 (109); Fahad Mutagana 3/7 (6 overs)		Ronald Omkara 18 (57); Aarnav Patel 6/15 (10 overs)

Kenya won by 23 runs (DLS method)
Gymkhana Club Ground, Dar es Salaam, Tanzania
Player of the match: Aarnav Patel (Ken)

- Uganda won the toss and elected to field.
- The match was reduced to 46 overs per side due to rain.

29 July 2023
9:30
Scorecard

Uganda; 137 (49.3 overs)	v	Sierra Leone; 138/9 (50 overs)
Fahad Mutagana 48 (92); Raymond Coker 4/22 (8 overs)		George Sesay 37 (106); Fahad Mutagana 3/20 (10 overs)

Sierra Leone won by 1 wicket
Gymkhana Club Ground, Dar es Salaam, Tanzania

- Sierra Leone won the toss and elected to field.

29 July 2023
9:30
Scorecard

Kenya; 88/4 (37.3 overs)	v	Nigeria; 84 (26.1 overs)
Darsh Panchani 56* (115); Victor Samuel 3/13 (10 overs)		Solomon Chilemanya 20 (33); Sanghani Hitendra 4/26 (10 overs)

Kenya won by 6 wickets
University of Dar es Salaam Ground, Dar es Salaam, Tanzania

- Kenya won the toss and elected to field.

30 July 2023
9:30
Scorecard

Nigeria; 95 (37 overs)	v	Namibia; 148/9 (50 overs)
Joshua Asia 27* (53); Peter-Daniel Blignaut 5/23 (10 overs)		Alexander Busing-Volschenk 34 (42); Joshua Asia 3/14 (10 overs)

Namibia won by 53 runs
Gymkhana Club Ground, Dar es Salaam, Tanzania

- Namibia won the toss and elected to bat.
- Namibia qualified for the 2024 ICC Under-19 Cricket World Cup as a result of this match.

30 July 2023
9:30
Scorecard

Tanzania; 259/9 (50 overs)	v	Sierra Leone; 117 (24.1 overs)
Shalik Basha 115* (129); George Sesay 3/27 (10 overs)		George Sesay 28 (42); Augustine Mwamele 4/16 (4.1 overs)

Tanzania won by 142 runs
University of Dar es Salaam Ground, Dar es Salaam, Tanzania

- Tanzania won the toss and elected to bat.

== Americas ==
The Americas qualifier took place in a single division, with the tournament was held in Canada from 11 to 18 August 2023 with four teams. Suriname withdrew from the tournament in July 2023.

- Argentina
- Bermuda
- Canada
- United States

=== Points Table ===
Pos	Team	Pld	W	L	NR	Pts	NRR	Qualification
1	United States	6	5	1	0	10	4.849	Advanced to the 2024 Under-19 Cricket World Cup
2	Canada	6	5	1	0	10	3.500	
3	Bermuda	6	1	4	1	3	−1.594	
4	Argentina	6	0	5	1	1	−7.655	

Updated to match(es) played on 14 August 2023. Source: ICC, Cricket World, cricket.com

=== Fixtures ===
11 August 2023
10:30
Scorecard

Canada; 408/9 (50 overs)	v	Argentina; 45 (16.3 overs)
Deol Dilraj 142 (123); Felipe Das Neves 4/76 (10 overs)		Felipe Pini 12 (23); Amalan Sivakumaran 4/10 (2.3 overs)

Canada won by 363 runs
Toronto Cricket, Skating and Curling Club Ground, Toronto, Canada

- Argentina won the toss and elected to bowl.

11 August 2023
10:30
Scorecard

Bermuda; 163/9 (50 overs)	v	United States; 164/3 (27.1 overs)
Jermal Proctor 90 (144); Khush Bhalala 3/18 (10 overs)		Prannav Chettipalayam 64 (62); Dionte Dowling 1/8 (3 overs)

United States won by 7 wickets
Maple Leaf North-West Ground, King City, Ontario, Canada

- United States won the toss and elected to bowl.

12 August 2023
10:30
Scorecard

United States; 183 (38.5 overs)	v	Canada; 184/8 (40 overs)
Arjun Mahesh 59 (79); Rohan Garg 3/31 (7.5 overs)		Deol Dilraj 32 (54); Utkarsh Srivastava 3/42 (8 overs)

Canada won by 2 wickets
Toronto Cricket, Skating and Curling Club Ground, Toronto, Canada

- Canada won the toss and elected to bowl.

12 August 2023
10:30
Scorecard

Argentina; 53 (22.4 overs)	v	Bermuda; 54/1 (6.3 overs)
Lucas Rossi 22 (25); Luke Horan 3/13 (6 overs)		Jermal Proctor 37* (25); Felipe Das Neves 1/32 (3.3 overs)

Bermuda won by 9 wickets
Maple Leaf North-West Ground, King City, Ontario, Canada

- Bermuda won the toss and elected to bowl.

14 August 2023
10:30
Scorecard

United States; 515/8 (50 overs)	v	Argentina; 65 (19.5 overs)
Bhavya Mehta 136 (91); Ignacio Mosquera 2/96 (9 overs)		Theo Vreugdenhil 18 (44); Aarin Nadkarni 6/21 (6 overs)

United States won by 450 runs
Toronto Cricket, Skating and Curling Club Ground, Toronto, Canada

- Argentina won the toss and elected to bowl.

14 August 2023
10:30
Scorecard

Bermuda; 202 (49.2 overs)	v	Canada; 203/5 (36.2 overs)
Zeri Tomlinson 67 (78); Amalan Sivakumaran 3/23 (10 overs)		Deol Dilraj 80* (95); Cadence Douglas 2/33 (6.2 overs)

Canada won by 5 wickets
Maple Leaf North-West Ground, King City, Ontario, Canada

- Canada won the toss and elected to bowl.

15 August 2023
10:30
Scorecard

Bermuda; 115 (41.5 overs)	v	United States; 116/3 (11.1 overs)
Luke Horan 30 (65); Utkarsh Srivastava 4/13 (8.5 overs)		Prannav Chettipalayam 60 (34); Luke Fulton 2/16 (3 overs)

United States won by 7 wickets
Toronto Cricket, Skating and Curling Club Ground, Toronto, Canada

- United States won the toss and elected to bowl.

15 August 2023
10:30
Scorecard

Argentina; 37 (10.2 overs)	v	Canada; 38/2 (3.3 overs)
Felipe Das Neves 14 (19); Mosam Parekh 7/24 (5 overs)		Yuvraj Samra 17 (9); Felipe Das Neves 1/30 (2 overs)

Canada won by 8 wickets
Maple Leaf North-West Ground, King City, Ontario, Canada
Player of the match: Mosam Parekh (CAN)

- Argentina won the toss and elected to bat.

17 August 2023
10:30
Scorecard

Bermuda; 97 (32.4 overs)	v	Canada; 101/4 (17.2 overs)
Sa Qui Robinson 25 (43); Yuvraj Hundal 3/17 (7 overs)		Yuvraj Samra 35 (33); Terron Webb 2/19 (2.2 overs)

Canada won by 6 wickets
Toronto Cricket, Skating and Curling Club Ground, Toronto, Canada
Player of the match: Yuvraj Hundal (CAN)

- Canada won the toss and elected to bowl.

17 August 2023
10:30
Scorecard

United States; 364 (50 overs)	v	Argentina; 36 (18.3 overs)
Pranav Chettipalayam 137 (104); Felipe Pini 5/60 (10 overs)		Maximo Veliz 13* (10); Aryan Satheesh 3/0 (2.3 overs)

United States won by 328 runs
Maple Leaf North-West Ground, King City, Ontario, Canada

- USA won the toss and elected to bat.

18 August 2023
10:30
Scorecard

Argentina	v	Bermuda

Match Abandoned
Toronto Cricket, Skating and Curling Club Ground, Toronto, Canada

- Match Abandoned without a ball bowled.

18 August 2023
10:30
Scorecard

Canada; 92/9 (22 overs)	v	United States; 96/3 (17.2 overs)
Yash Mondkar 22 (28); Parth Patel 3/17 (4 overs)		Prannav Chettipalayam 36* (39); Amalan Sivakumaran 1/19 (5 overs)

United States won by 7 wickets
Maple Leaf North-West Ground, King City, Ontario, Canada

- United States won the toss and elected to bowl.
- The match was reduced to 23 overs per side due to rain. After 9.3 overs in the first innings, the match was reduced to 22 overs due to rain. USA was set a revised target of 93 runs.

== Asia ==
The Asian qualifier had two divisions, with the top two teams from the Division 2 tournament progressing to the main Asia qualification tournament.

=== Asia - Division 2 ===
The following teams took part in the Division 2 tournament, from 29 September to 7 October in Oman.

Group A	Group B
Bahrain; Bhutan; Oman; Saudi Arabia	Hong Kong; Qatar; Singapore; Thailand

==== Group A ====
Pos	Team	Pld	W	L	NR	Pts	NRR	
1	Oman	3	3	0	0	6	2.596	Advanced to the semi-finals
2	Bahrain	3	2	1	0	4	0.933	Advanced to the semi-finals
3	Saudi Arabia	3	1	2	0	2	−0.334	
4	Bhutan	3	0	3	0	0	−3.402	

Source: CricClubs

No.	Date	Team 1	Score	Team 2	Score	Venue	Result
Match 1	29 September 2022	Oman	255/9 (50)	Bhutan	54 (20.5)	Al Amerat Cricket Stadium (Ministry Turf 1), Muscat	Oman won by 201 runs
Match 2	29 September 2022	Bahrain	159 (37.1)	Saudi Arabia	102 (30.5)	Al Amerat Cricket Stadium (Ministry Turf 2), Muscat	Bahrain won by 57 runs
Match 5	1 October 2022	Bahrain	244/9 (50)	Bhutan	75 (33.1)	Al Amerat Cricket Stadium (Ministry Turf 1), Muscat	Bahrain won by 169 runs
Match 6	1 October 2022	Saudi Arabia	103 (37.3)	Oman	104/4 (27)	Al Amerat Cricket Stadium (Ministry Turf 2), Muscat	Oman won by 6 wickets
Match 9	3 October 2022	Bhutan	73 (27)	Saudi Arabia	78/5 (21.3)	Al Amerat Cricket Stadium (Ministry Turf 1), Muscat	Saudi Arabia won by 5 wickets
Match 10	3 October 2022	Oman	178 (48.5)	Bahrain	92 (34.3)	Al Amerat Cricket Stadium (Ministry Turf 2), Muscat	Oman won by 86 runs

==== Group B ====
Pos	Team	Pld	W	L	NR	Pts	NRR	
1	Singapore	3	3	0	0	6	2.533	Advanced to the semi-finals
2	Hong Kong	3	2	1	0	4	1.048	Advanced to the semi-finals
3	Qatar	3	1	2	0	2	−1.772	
4	Thailand	3	0	3	0	0	−2.058	

Source: CricClubs

No.	Date	Team 1	Score	Team 2	Score	Venue	Result
Match 3	30 September 2022	Singapore	310/9 (50)	Qatar	155 (42.1)	Al Amerat Cricket Stadium (Ministry Turf 1), Muscat	Singapore won by 155 runs
Match 4	30 September 2022	Thailand	89 (27.2)	Hong Kong	92/1 (19.1)	Al Amerat Cricket Stadium (Ministry Turf 2), Muscat	Hong Kong
Match 7	2 October 2022	Singapore	248/6 (50)	Thailand	81 (33.4)	Al Amerat Cricket Stadium (Ministry Turf 1), Muscat	Singapore won by 167 runs
Match 8	2 October 2022	Qatar	123 (40.4)	Hong Kong	127/2 (27)	Al Amerat Cricket Stadium (Ministry Turf 2), Muscat	Hong Kong won by 8 wickets
Match 11	4 October 2022	Thailand	170 (48.4)	Qatar	171/5 *(49)	Al Amerat Cricket Stadium (Ministry Turf 1), Muscat	Qatar won by 5 wickets
Match 12	4 October 2022	Singapore	209 (50)	Hong Kong	151 (48.3)	Al Amerat Cricket Stadium (Ministry Turf 2), Muscat	Singapore won by 58 runs

==== Play-offs ====
===== Semi-finals =====
6 October 2022
09:30
Scorecard

Oman; 208/7 (50)	v	Hong Kong; 212/7 (48)
Lakshmi Satish 52 (86); Aryan Chandiramani 2/34 (7 overs)		Jayden Botfield 51 (54); Aditya Gurumukhi 3/37 (7 overs)

Hong Kong won by 3 wickets
Al Amerat Cricket Stadium (Ministry Turf 1), Muscat
Umpires: Akbar Ali, Lyndon Hannibal and Kalidas Viswanadan

- Oman won the toss and elected to bat.

6 October 2022
09:30
Scorecard

Bahrain; 62 (37)	v	Singapore; 63/0 (12.3)
Rishabh Ramesh 19 (36); Adwitya Bhargava 3/15 (6 overs)		Rahil Khan 30* (41)

Singapore won by 10 wickets
Al Amerat Cricket Stadium (Ministry Turf 2), Muscat
Umpires: Tabarak Dar, Rahul Asher and Vinay Kumar

- Bahrain won the toss and elected to bat.

===== 3rd-place play-off =====
7 October 2022
09:30
Scorecard

Oman; 258/4 (50)	v	Bahrain; 71 (19.5)
Aryan Bisht* 78 (82); Nadith Tennakoon 2/49 (10 overs)		Aryan Ashwin 26 (34); Mohammed Islam 3/16 (6 overs)

Oman won by 187 runs
Al Amerat Cricket Stadium (Ministry Turf 2), Muscat

- Oman won the toss and elected to bat.

===== Final =====
7 October 2022
09:30
Scorecard

Hong Kong; 201/9 (50)	v	Singapore; 207/5 (37.2)
Parth Bhagwat 29 (42); Vihaan Hampihallikar 2/34 (9 overs)		Vihaan Maheshwari 102 (92); Aryan Chandiramani 2/44 (7 overs)

Singapore won by 5 wickets
Al Amerat Cricket Stadium (Ministry Turf 1), Muscat

- Hong Kong won the toss and elected to bat.

=== Asia - Division 1 ===
Three teams and the top two teams from the Division 2 tournament were scheduled to take part in the Division 1 tournament in the United Arab Emirates, was held from 24 February to 2 March 2023.

- Hong Kong
- Kuwait
- Malaysia
- Nepal
- Singapore
- United Arab Emirates

Pos	Team	Pld	W	L	NR	Pts	NRR	
1	Nepal	5	5	0	0	10	2.923	Advanced to 2024 World Cup
2	United Arab Emirates	5	4	1	0	8	2.962	
3	Singapore	5	3	2	0	6	−0.540	
4	Hong Kong	5	2	3	0	4	−0.819	
5	Malaysia	5	1	4	0	2	−0.617	
6	Kuwait	5	0	5	0	0	−2.456	

Source: CricketWorld

No.	Date	Team 1	Score	Team 2	Score	Venue	Result
Match 1	24 February 2023	Malaysia	121 (43)	United Arab Emirates	122/3 (17.2)	Malek Cricket Stadium, Ajman	United Arab Emirates won by 7 wickets
Match 2	24 February 2023	Kuwait	212 (49)	Hong Kong	214/9 (49.1)	Malek Cricket Stadium, Ajman	Hong Kong won by 1 wicket
Match 3	24 February 2023	Nepal	261/7 (50)	Singapore	165/7 (50)	Eden Gardens, Ajman	Nepal won by 96 runs
Match 4	25 February 2023	Malaysia	202 (50)	Singapore	202 (47.5)	Malek Cricket Stadium, Ajman	Match tied; Singapore won by the super over
Match 5	25 February 2023	Nepal	343/7 (50)	Kuwait	100 (30.5)	Malek Cricket Stadium, Ajman	Nepal won by 243 runs
Match 6	25 February 2023	United Arab Emirates	279/5 (50)	Hong Kong	116 (45.4)	Eden Gardens, Ajman	United Arab Emirates won by 163 runs
Match 7	27 February 2023	Hong Kong	120 (46.3)	Nepal	126/1 (22.1)	Malek Cricket Stadium, Ajman	Nepal won by 9 wickets
Match 8	27 February 2023	Singapore	101 (37.4)	United Arab Emirates	102/2 (13.2)	Malek Cricket Stadium, Ajman	United Arab Emirates won by 8 wickets
Match 9	27 February 2023	Kuwait	141 (33.2)	Malaysia	145/5 (39.2)	Eden Gardens, Ajman	Malaysia won by 5 wickets
Match 10	28 February 2023	Kuwait	100 (44.5)	United Arab Emirates	103/2 (13.1)	Malek Cricket Stadium, Ajman	United Arab Emirates won by 8 wickets
Match 11	28 February 2023	Malaysia	72 (35.3)	Nepal	73/0 (9.0)	Malek Cricket Stadium, Ajman	Nepal won by 10 wickets
Match 12	28 February 2023	Singapore	218/8 (50)	Hong Kong	211/7 (50)	Eden Gardens, Ajman	Singapore won by 7 runs
Match 13	2 March 2023	Nepal	191 (48.5)	United Arab Emirates	184 (48)	Eden Gardens, Ajman	Nepal won by 7 runs
Match 14	2 March 2023	Malaysia	136 (36.3)	Hong Kong	140/4 (26.2)	Malek Cricket Stadium, Ajman	Hong Kong won by 6 wickets
Match 15	2 March 2023	Singapore	242 (49.2)	Kuwait	131 (41.1)	Malek Cricket Stadium, Ajman	Singapore won by 111 runs

== East Asia-Pacific ==
The East Asia-Pacific qualifier wss played in Darwin, Australia, from 12 to 21 June 2023, with seven teams participated in a single division:

- New Zealand
- Indonesia
- Japan
- Fiji
- Papua New Guinea
- Samoa
- Vanuatu

=== Points Table ===
Pos	Team	Pld	W	L	NR	Pts	NRR	
1	New Zealand	6	6	0	0	12	5.366	Advanced to 2024 World Cup
2	Japan	6	5	1	0	10	2.048	
3	Fiji	6	4	2	0	8	−0.421	
4	Papua New Guinea	6	3	3	0	6	0.052	
5	Indonesia	6	2	4	0	4	−1.477	
6	Samoa	6	1	5	0	2	−1.889	
7	Vanuatu	6	0	6	0	0	−3.171	

Source: Cricclub

=== Fixtures ===
12 June 2023
9:30
Scorecard

Vanuatu; 122 (28.2 overs)	v	Indonesia; 123/6 (38.5 overs)
Roderick Lekai 33 (39); Made Rama Yuda Diputra 3/27 (3 overs)		I Nyoman Adi Budana 24 (42); Josh Andrew Molivakoro 3/34 (10 overs)

Indonesia won by 4 wickets
Marrara Cricket Ground (MCG 2), Darwin
Player of the match: Roderick Lekai (Van)

- Indonesia won the toss and elected to field.

12 June 2023
10:00
Scorecard

Fiji; 117 (33.4 overs)	v	Papua New Guinea; 98 (30.4 overs)
Sunia Tuiwai Yalimaiwai 28 (32); Nao Tau 4/23 (10 overs)		Nao Tau 29* (56); Viliame Matai Waqavakatoga 3/23 (10 overs)

Fiji won by 19 runs
Cazalys Oval, Carins Queensland
Player of the match: Sunia Tuiwai Yalimaiwai (Fij)

- Fiji won the toss and elected to bat.

12 June 2023
13:30
Scorecard

New Zealand; 295 (50 overs)	v	Japan; 133 (43.5 overs)
Zac Cumming 78 (62); Kiefer Yamamoto-Lake 3/89 (10 overs)		Koji Hardgrave-Abe 37 (60); Zac Cumming 3/14 (4 overs)

New Zealand won by 162 runs
Marrara Oval, Darwin
Player of the match: Zac Cumming (NZL)

- Japan won the toss and elected to field.

13 June 2023
9:30
Scorecard

Fiji; 112 (30.5 overs)	v	Indonesia; 111 (48.1 overs)
Tukana Samuela Manakiwai 35 (63); I Gede Teguh Pranatha Wiguna 5/17 (7.5 overs)		I Nyoman Adi Budana 25 (82); Sunia Tuiwai Yalimaiwai 5/13 (10 overs)

Fiji won by 1 run
Marrara Cricket Ground (MCG 2), Darwin
Player of the match: Sunia Tuiwai Yalimaiwai (Fij)

- Indonesia won the toss and elected to field.

13 June 2023
10:00

Papua New Guinea; 257/9 (50 overs)	v	Samoa; 153 (37.3 overs)
Dauncey Tom 81 (71); Darren Roache 6/48 (10 overs)		So Joe Vailigi Rarotoga 31 (60); James Frank Momo 3/27 (7 overs)

Papua New Guinea won by 104 runs
Cazalys Oval, Carins Queensland
Player of the match: Dauncey Tom (PNG)

- Samoa won the toss and elected to field.

13 June 2023
13:30
Scorecard

New Zealand; 431/7 (50 overs)	v	Vanuatu; 35 (23 overs)
Snehith Reddy 84 (78); Shay Narai 2/77 (10 overs)		Raymondo Lekai 11 (39); Ryan Tsourgas 3/12 (7 overs)

New Zealand won by 396 runs
Marrara Oval, Darwin

- New Zealand won the toss and elected to bat.

15 June 2023
9:30
Scorecard

Fiji; 81 (30.4 overs)	v	Japan; 82/2 (15 overs)
Dawson Roko Tawake 17 (20); Shotaro Hiratsuka 5/32 (9 overs)		Koji H-Abe 28 (32); Viliame Matai W 1/20 (5 overs)

Japan won by 8 wickets
Marrara Cricket Ground (MCG 2), Darwin
Player of the match: Shotaro Hiratsuka (Jpn)

- Fiji won the toss and elected to bat.

15 June 2023
10:00
Scorecard

New Zealand; 454/8 (50 overs)	v	Samoa; 115 (27.2 overs)
Alex Thompson 100 (91); Punapunavale Su’a Sale 2/49 (6 overs)		Maene Kilita Tuilaepa 16 (16); Rahman Hekmat 3/24 (6 overs)

New Zealand won by 339 runs
Marrara Oval, Darwin
Player of the match: Alex Thompson (NZL)

- Samoa won the toss and elected to field.

15 June 2023
13:30
Scorecard

Papua New Guinea; 221 (38.4 overs)	v	Indonesia; 148 (45.2 overs)
Dauncey Tom 63 (28); Marianus Molo 3/16 (4 overs)		I Gede Teguh Pranatha Wiguna 43 (108); Anthony Tamarua David 2/21 (9 overs)

Papua New Guinea won by 73 runs
Gardens Oval, Darwin
Player of the match: Dauncey Tom (PNG)

- Papua New Guinea won the toss and elected to bat.

16 June 2023
9:30
Scorecard

Japan; 298/7 (50 overs)	v	Vanuatu; 40 (12.5 overs)
Koji Hardgrave-Abe 127 (111); Shay Narai 3/46 (10 overs)		Shay Narai 14 (14); Kiefer Yamamoto-Lake 7/11 (6 overs)

Japan won by 258 runs
Marrara Cricket Ground (MCG 2), Darwin
Player of the match: Kiefer Yamamoto-Lake (Jpn)

- Japan won the toss and elected to bat.

16 June 2023
10:00
Scorecard

Fiji; 46 (13.1 overs)	v	New Zealand; 47/2 (12.1 overs)
Sunia Tuiwai Yalimaiwai 18 (20); Cameron Paul 5/10 (5 overs)		Snehith Reddy 21 (28); Viliame Matai Waqavakatoga 1/14 (5 overs)

New Zealand won by 8 wickets
Cazalys Oval, Carins Queensland
Player of the match: Cameron Paul (NZL)

- Fiji won the toss and elected to bat.

16 June 2023
13:30
Scorecard

Samoa; 101 (26.1 overs)	v	Indonesia; 102/6 (36.5 overs)
Darren Roache 34 (22); Marianus Molo 4/28 (8 overs)		Andreas Alexander Hawoe 28 (42); So Joe Vailigi Rarotoga 3/19 (7 overs)

Indonesia won by 4 wickets
Marrara Oval, Darwin
Umpires: Kim Cotton (NZL) and Eloise Sheridan (Aus)

- Indonesia won the toss and elected to field.

18 June 2023
9:30
Scorecard

Japan; 259 (49.5 overs)	v	Samoa; 125 (36 overs)
Kazuma Kato-Stafford 52 (63); Punapunavale Su’a Sale 3/29 (9.5 overs)		Darren Roache 40 (68); Kazuma Kato-Stafford 3/26 (7 overs)

Japan won by 134 runs
Marrara Oval, Darwin

- Japan won the toss and elected to bat.

18 June 2023
10:00
Scorecard

Fiji; 66 (21.4 overs)	v	Vanuatu; 31 (14 overs)
Jazray Samuel Browne 20 (40); Shay Narai 5/18 (8 overs)		Sahlin Meltetake 6 (11); Viliame Matai Waqavakatoga 5/10 (7 overs)

Fiji won by 35 runs
Marrara Cricket Ground (MCG 2), Darwin

- Fiji won the toss and elected to bat.

18 June 2023
13:30
Scorecard

New Zealand; 245/7 (50 overs)	v	Papua New Guinea; 102 (34.5 overs)
Tom Jones 72 (72); James Frank Momo 3/34 (8 overs)		Nelson Pate 46 (113); Ryan Tsourgas 3/10 (4 overs)

New Zealand won by 143 runs
TIO Stadium, Darwin

- Papua New Guinea won the toss and elected to field.

19 June 2023
10:00
Scorecard

Vanuatu; 126 (31.5 overs)	v	Samoa; 127/2 (25 overs)
Curran Tor William Kendrick 50 (59); Punapunavale Su’a Sale 5/27 (10 overs)		Afapene Filesafoti Ilaoa 64* (59); Shay Narai 1/26 (9 overs)

Samoa won by 8 wickets
Marrara Cricket Ground (MCG 2), Darwin

- Vanuatu won the toss and elected to bat.

19 June 2023
10:30
Scorecard

New Zealand; 377/6 (50 overs)	v	Indonesia; 75 (31.2 overs)
Tom Jones 102 (113); Erianto Mangopo 4/82 (9.1 overs)		Erianto Mangopo 9 (70); Zac Cumming 6/14 (7 overs)

New Zealand won by 302 runs
Marrara Oval, Darwin

- New Zealand won the toss and elected to bat.
- As a result of this match New Zealand qualified for 2024 Under-19 Cricket World Cup in South Africa.

19 June 2023
13:30
Scorecard

Papua New Guinea; 95 (29.3 overs)	v	Japan; 95/5 (32.4 overs)
Gaba Frank 18 (29); Suvenia Sean Tau 18 (29); Kiefer Yamamoto-Lake 3/14 (6.3 overs)		Aditya Phadke 27 (64); Ramzi Stanley Bau 2/17 (5 overs)

Japan won by 5 wickets
TIO Stadium, Darwin
Player of the match: Hirotake Kakinuma (Jpn)

- Papua New Guinea won the toss and elected to bat.

21 June 2023
10:00
Scorecard

Fiji; 197 (42.3 overs)	v	Samoa; 194 (47 overs)
Dawson Roko Tawake 33 (37); Tineimoli Misi Ropati 3/27 (8 overs)		Afapene Filesafoti Ilaoa 90 (91); Joeli Qalo Ki Moala 3/18 (10 overs)

Fiji won by 3 runs
Marrara Cricket Ground (MCG 2), Darwin

- Fiji won the toss and elected to bat.

21 June 2023
10:30
Scorecard

Indonesia; 94 (42.2 overs)	v	Japan; 95/3 (17.2 overs)
Fabio Yoel Rayo 24 (101); Aditya Phadke 4/4 (3.2 overs)		Aditya Phadke 42* (46); I Gede Teguh Pranatha Wiguna 1/26 (5 overs)

Japan won by 7 wickets
TIO Stadium, Darwin

- Indonesia won the toss and elected to bat.

21 June 2023
11:00
Scorecard

Vanuatu; 135 (33 overs)	v	Papua New Guinea; 136/6 (32.1 overs)
Shay Narai 34 (41); Methuselah William 3/19 (6 overs)		Aluend Robson Boge 39* (95); Shay Narai 3/33 (10 overs)

Papua New Guinea won by 4 wickets
Marrara Oval, Darwin

- Vanuatu won the toss and elected to bat.

== Europe ==
The European qualifier had two divisions, with the top three teams from the Division 2 tournament progressing to the main European qualification tournament.

=== Europe - Division 2 ===
The following teams took part in the Division 2 tournament from 5 August to 11 August 2022 on Guernsey.

Group A	Group B
France; Germany; Guernsey; Italy	Denmark; Isle of Man; Norway; Sweden

==== Group A ====
Pos	Team	Pld	W	L	NR	Pts	NRR	
1	Guernsey	3	3	0	0	6	3.084	Advanced to the semi-finals
2	Italy	3	2	1	0	4	0.603	Advanced to the semi-finals
3	Germany	3	1	2	0	2	0.513	Advanced to the 5th place semi-finals
4	France	3	0	3	0	0	−4.972	Advanced to the 5th place semi-finals

No.	Date	Team 1	Score	Team 2	Score	Venue	Result
Match 3	5 August 2022	France	32 (17.3)	Guernsey	33/1 (5.3)	Memorial Field, Guernsey	Guernsey by 9 wickets
Match 4	5 August 2022	Germany	236/8 (50)	Italy	237/5 (42.2)	Guernsey Rovers Athletic Club Ground, Port Soif	Italy by 5 wickets
Match 5	6 August 2022	Germany	135 (38)	Guernsey	136/2 (21.3)	King George V Sports Ground, Castel	Guernsey by 8 wickets
Match 6	6 August 2022	France	34 (20.1)	Italy	35/0 (6.2)	College Field, Saint Peter Port	Italy by 10 wickets
Match 11	8 August 2022	Italy	172 (44.4)	Guernsey	173/2 (37)	College Field, Saint Peter Port	Guernsey by 8 wickets
Match 12	8 August 2022	Germany	319/8 (50)	France	127 (37)	Memorial Field, Guernsey	Germany by 192 runs

==== Group B ====
Pos	Team	Pld	W	L	NR	Pts	NRR	
1	Isle of Man	3	3	0	0	6	2.735	Advanced to the semi-finals
2	Norway	3	2	1	0	4	−1.086	Advanced to the semi-finals
3	Denmark	3	1	2	0	2	−0.303	Advanced to the 5th place semi-finals
4	Sweden	3	0	3	0	0	−0.910	Advanced to the 5th place semi-finals

No.	Date	Team 1	Score	Team 2	Score	Venue	Result
Match 1	5 August 2022	Denmark	211 (42.5)	Norway	214/7 (43.5)	King George V Sports Ground, Castel	Norway by 3 wickets
Match 2	5 August 2022	Sweden	196/9 (50)	Isle of Man	198/3 (33.2)	College Field, Saint Peter Port	Isle of Man by 7 wickets
Match 7	6 August 2022	Norway	101 (38.2)	Isle of Man	105/2 (10.3)	Memorial Field, Guernsey	Isle of Man by 8 wickets
Match 8	6 August 2022	Denmark	265/8 (50)	Sweden	244 47.5	Guernsey Rovers Athletic Club Ground, Port Soif	Denmark by 21 runs
Match 9	8 August 2022	Norway	285/5 (50)	Sweden	265 (48.4)	King George V Sports Ground, Castel	Norway by 20 runs
Match 10	8 August 2022	Denmark	271/7 (50)	Isle of Man	272/5 (44.2)	Guernsey Rovers Athletic Club Ground, Port Soif	Isle of Man by 5 wickets

==== Consolation play-offs ====
===== 5th Place semi-finals =====
9 August 2022
11:00
Scorecard

France; 102 (23.3 overs)	v	Denmark; 106/5 (22 overs)
Sajad Stanikzay 36 (37); Eshan Karimi 6/24 (9 overs)		Hariz Razwan Ahmad 32 (54); Sajad Stanikzay 4/41 (10 overs)

Denmark won by 5 wickets
Memorial Field, Guernsey
Umpires: Jason Flannery (Ger) and Darrin Clark (Esp)

- France won the toss and elected to bat.

9 August 2022
11:00
Scorecard

Germany; 155 (41 overs)	v	Sweden; 156/4 (35.5 overs)
Honeyjit Singh Brar 35 (55); Abdul Bilal Abdul 3/23 (10 overs)		Kavinshankar Meenakshisundaram 59 (76); Marcin-Eduan Van Eyssen 1/21 (8 overs)

Sweden won by 6 wickets
Guernsey Rovers Athletic Club Ground, Port Soif
Umpires: Richard Veillard (Gue), Sunil Chandiramani (Gib) and Shanaka Fernando (Ita)

- Germany won the toss and elected to bat.

===== 7th-place play-off =====
11 August 2022
11:00
Scorecard

France; 75 (32.2 overs)	v	Germany; 79/2 (12.2 overs)
Asim Raja 12 (18); Niall Perfect 5/32 (10 overs)		Adhyay Datta 34* (40); Sajad Stanikzay 2/31 (5 overs)

Germany won by 8 wickets
Guernsey Rovers Athletic Club Ground, Port Soif
Umpires: Jason Flannery and Martin Hancock

- France won the toss and elected to bat.

===== 5th-place play-off =====
11 August 2022
11:00
Scorecard

Denmark; 272/9 (50 overs)	v	Sweden; 215/9 (50 overs)
Mansoor Khan 107* (69); Azim Chinwari 3/39 (10 overs)		Abdul Bilal Abdul 36 (29); Hariz Razwan Ahmad 2/2 (1 overs)

Denmark won by 57 runs
Memorial Field, Guernsey
Umpires: Vinay Malhotra, Richard Veillard and Shanaka Fernando

- Sweden won the toss and elected to field

==== Play-offs ====
===== Semi-finals =====
9 August 2022
11:00
Scorecard

Norway; 168 (44.4 overs)	v	Guernsey; 169/8 (40.2 overs)
Ans Ahmed 60* (98); Maxwell Johnson 4/19 (6 overs)		Charlie Forshaw 29* (41); Chaudhary Akram 4/26 (10 overs)

Guernsey won by 2 wickets
King George V Sports Ground, Castel
Umpires: Graham Lloyd, Martin Hancock and Gerrie Pienaar

- Guernsey won the toss and elected to field

9 August 2022
11:00
Scorecard

Isle of Man; 131 (30.5 overs)	v	Italy; 136/5 (25.2 overs)
Luke Ward 43 (49); Gurpreet Singh 5/20 (7.5 overs)		Sadev Nethsara Wadiya Pathirage 34 (22); Jerad Griffin 2/35 (6 overs)

Italy won by 5 wickets
College Field, Saint Peter Port
Umpires: Vinay Malhotra (Ger), Ahsan Raza and Aidan Seaver (Ire)

- Italy won the toss and elected to field

===== 3rd-place play-off =====
11 August 2022
11:00
Scorecard

Isle of Man; 296 (50 overs)	v	Norway; 297/3 (41.1 overs)
Christian Webster 112 (89); Baryalai Patekhel 5/49 (10 overs)		Chaudhary Akram 160* (106); Jerad Griffin 1/32 (7 overs)

Norway won by 7 wickets
College Field, Saint Peter Port
Umpires: Graham Lloyd, Aidan Seaver and Ahsan Raza

- Norway won the toss and elected to field

===== Final =====
11 August 2022
11:00
Scorecard

Guernsey; 169 (47 overs)	v	Italy; 170/4 (38 overs)
Joseph Marshall 47* (66); Katupellallage Fonseka 4/27 (7.4 overs)		Marco Carlo Giaconi 51* (93); Harry Duke 2/29 (8 overs)

Italy won by 6 wickets
King George V Sports Ground, Castel
Umpires: Muhammad Adnan, Sunil Chandiramani and Darrin Clark

- Italy won the toss and elected to field

=== Europe - Division 1 ===
Three teams and the top three teams from the Division 2 tournament took part in the Division 1 tournament, held in the Netherlands from 6 to 12 August 2023.

- Netherlands
- Scotland
- Jersey
- Guernsey
- Norway
- Italy

=== Points Table ===
Pos	Team	Pld	W	L	NR	Pts	NRR	
1	Scotland	5	4	0	1	9	2.001	Advanced to 2024 World Cup
2	Guernsey	5	2	2	1	5	−0.532	
3	Jersey	5	2	2	1	5	−0.798	
4	Netherlands	5	1	2	2	4	0.857	
5	Norway	5	1	2	2	4	−0.762	
6	Italy	5	1	3	1	3	0.593	

Updated to match(es) played on 10 August 2023. Source: ICC, Cricket World

=== Fixtures ===
6 August 2023
11:00
Scorecard

Jersey	v	Norway

Match Abandoned
Hazelaarweg Stadion, Rotterdam, Netherlands
Umpires: Martin Saggers (Eng), David McLean (Sco) and Nitin Bathi (Ned)

- Match Abandoned without a ball bowled.

6 August 2023
11:00
Scorecard

Italy	v	Netherlands

Match Abandoned
Sportpark Westvliet, The Hague, Netherlands
Umpires: Jareth McCready (Ire), Mark Jameson (Ger) and Ryan Milne (Sco)

- Match Abandoned without a ball bowled.

6 August 2023
11:00
Scorecard

Guernsey	v	Scotland

Match Abandoned
Sportpark Thurlede, Schiedam, Netherlands
Umpires: Mike Burns (Eng), Paul Reynolds (Ire) and Rizwan Akram (Ned)

- Match Abandoned without a ball bowled.

7 August 2023
11:00
Scorecard

Italy; 138/7 (31 overs)	v	Norway; 138/9 (30.4/31 overs)
Gianluca Longo 44 (60); Sahil Singh 3/33 (6 overs)		Aminullah Tanha 52 (51); Sahas Arachchige 3/15 (6 overs)

Norway won by 1 wicket (DLS method)
Hazelaarweg Stadion, Rotterdam, Netherlands
Umpires: Rizwan Akram (Ned), Ryan Milne (Sco) and Mark Jameson (Ger)

- Norway won the toss and elected to bowl.
- The match was reduced to 31 overs per side due to rain. Norway was set a revised target of 138 runs.

7 August 2023
11:00
Scorecard

Scotland; 276/9 (50 overs)	v	Jersey; 206 (44.5 overs)
Jamie Dunk 87 (102); Louis Kelly 5/42 (10 overs)		William Perchard 64 (101); Alec Price 4/29 (10 overs)

Scotland won by 70 runs
Sportpark Westvliet, The Hague, Netherlands
Umpires: Mike Burns (Eng), Nitin Bathi (Ned) and Paul Reynolds (Ire)

- Scotland won the toss and elected to bat.

7 August 2023
11:00
Scorecard

Guernsey; 46 (29.1 overs)	v	Netherlands; 51/1 (11.5 overs)
Harry Duke 7 (29); Michael Molenaar 3/16 (8 overs)		Jacobus Nel 18 (32); Marcus Thomas 1/14 (2.5 overs)

Netherlands won by 9 wickets
Sportpark Thurlede, Schiedam, Netherlands
Umpires: Jareth McCready (Ire), David McLean (Sco) and Martin Saggers (Eng)

- Netherlands won the toss and elected to bowl.

9 August 2023
11:00
Scorecard

Scotland; 296/8 (50 overs)	v	Netherlands; 250 (48 overs)
Alec Price 82 (106); Teun Leijer 4/75 (8 overs)		Cedric de Lange 103 (122); Mackenzie Jones 3/34 (10 overs)

Scotland won by 46 runs
Hazelaarweg Stadion, Rotterdam, Netherlands
Umpires: Paul Reynolds (Ire), Mark Jameson (Ger) and Mike Burns (Eng)

- Scotland won the toss and elected to bat.

9 August 2023
11:00
Scorecard

Guernsey; 80 (37.4 overs)	v	Norway; 59 (22 overs)
Oliver Clapham 18 (92); Aminullah Tanha 4/14 (4.4 overs)		Aminullah Tanha 29 (40); Harry Duke 5/18 (10 overs)

Guernsey won by 21 runs
Sportpark Westvliet, The Hague, Netherlands
Umpires: Martin Saggers (Eng), Rizwan Akram (Ned) and David McLean (Sco)

- Norway won the toss and elected to bowl.

9 August 2023
11:00
Scorecard

Jersey; 153 (40.4 overs)	v	Italy; 157/4 (33.4 overs)
Patrick Beau Gurner 42 (60); Sahas Arachchige 3/42 (10 overs)		Matthew Ross 44 (57); William Perchard 2/45 (6 overs)

Italy won by 6 wickets
Sportpark Thurlede, Schiedam, Netherlands
Umpires: Nitin Bathi (Ned), Ryan Milne (Sco) and Jareth McCready (Ire)

- Italy won the toss and elected to bowl.

10 August 2023
11:00
Scorecard

Italy; 140 (42 overs)	v	Guernsey; 141/4 (47.5 overs)
Marco Giaconi 30 (39); Harry Johnson 3/27 (10 overs)		Charlie Forshaw 55* (79); Matthew Ross 2/39 (9 overs)

Guernsey won by 6 wickets
Hazelaarweg Stadion, Rotterdam, Netherlands
Umpires: Jareth McCready (Ire), David McLean (Sco) and Nitin Bathi (Ned)

- Guernsey won the toss and elected to bowl.

10 August 2023
11:00
Scorecard

Jersey; 243/6 (50 overs)	v	Netherlands; 231 (48.4 overs)
Stanley Norman 54 (67); Tom de Leede 3/34 (9 overs)		Cedric de Lange 71 (95); Charlie Brennan 4/43 (10 overs)

Jersey won by 12 runs
Sportpark Westvliet, The Hague, Netherlands
Umpires: Mike Burns (Eng), Paul Reynolds (Ire) and Ryan Milne (Sco)

- Netherlands won the toss and elected to bowl.

10 August 2023
11:00
Scorecard

Norway; 116 (38.3 overs)	v	Scotland; 117/0 (24.5 overs)
Aminullah Tanha 20 (37); James Hobman 3/25 (10 overs)		Jamie Dunk 52* (78); Aminullah Tanha 0/20 (6 overs)

Scotland won by 10 wickets
Sportpark Thurlede, Schiedam, Netherlands
Umpires: Mark Jameson (Ger), Martin Saggers (Eng) and Rizwan Akram (Ned)

- Scotland won the toss and elected to bowl.

12 August 2023
11:00
Scorecard

Guernsey; 111/6 (20 overs)	v	Jersey; 112/6 (18.1/20 overs)
Harry Duke 37 (46); Louis Kelly 2/11 (4 overs)		Charlie Brennan 56* (42); Harry Duke 3/21 (4 overs)

Jersey won by 4 wickets
Hazelaarweg Stadion, Rotterdam, Netherlands

- Jersey won the toss and elected to bowl.
- The match was reduced to 20 overs per side due to rain.

12 August 2023
11:00
Scorecard

Scotland; 229 (39.4/45 overs)	v	Italy; 78 (30.1/45 overs)
Jamie Dunk 96 (99); Gurpreet Singh 7/25 (8 overs)		Gianluca Longo 21 (22); Adi Hedge 5/15 (9 overs)

Scotland won by 151 runs
Sportpark Westvliet, The Hague, Netherlands

- Italy won the toss and elected to bowl.
- The match was reduced to 45 overs per side due to rain.
- Scotland qualified for the 2024 ICC Under-19 Cricket World Cup as a result of this match.

12 August 2023
11:00
Scorecard

Norway	v	Netherlands

Match Abandoned
Sportpark Thurlede, Schiedam, Netherlands

- Match Abandoned without a ball bowled.
