= Spain national under-19 cricket team =

Personnel
- Captain: Jack Perman
- Coach: Unknown
- Owner: Cricket Spain (CS)

History
- List A debut: v. Gibraltar at King William's College, Castletown, Isle of Man; 27 July 2011

International Cricket Council
- ICC status: Associate member (2017); Affiliate member (1992)
- ICC region: European Cricket Council (ECC)

The Spain Under-19 cricket team represents Spain in U-19 international cricket. The team is controlled by Cricket Spain (CS). The team have not yet qualified for the ICC Under-19 Cricket World Cup.

== History ==
The Spain national under-19 cricket team played their debut game against Gibraltar on 27 July 2011 at King William's College, Castletown, Isle of Man. Since then the team have been playing qualification round of ICC Under-19 Cricket World Cup but have not qualified yet for the main tournament.

== Current squad ==
The following players are recently called up for the 2026 Under-19 Cricket World Cup qualification.

As of 29 April 2025

Name	Date of birth	Batting style	Bowling style
Jack Perman (Captain)	18 September 2000	Right hand bat	Right arm offbreak
Charles Hunt	11 February 2002	Right hand bat	Right arm offbreak
Ali Sarmad Sharif Kousar	18 August 2011	Right hand bat	
Charlie Rumistrzewicz	3 May 2005	Right Hand bat	Right arm medium fast
Hamza Nisar	28 October 2002	Right hand bat	Right arm offbreak
Sanwal Masood (Vice-Captain)	24 March 2002	Right Hand bat	Right arm medium fast
Rupert James	11 March 2001	Right hand bat	Legbreak
Kyle Roper	26 January 2003	Left hand bat	Right arm medium fast
Shehryaar Riaz	18 April 2002	Right hand bat	Right arm medium
Connor Wood	18 September 2003	Right hand bat Wicketkeeper	
Nadim Hussain Naureen	22 August 2001	Right hand bat	

== Records & statistics ==
International match summary

As of 9 May 2025

Playing records
Format	M	W	L	T	D/NR	Inaugural match
Minor One Day Matches	9	2	7	0	0	27 July 2011

As of 4 October 2024

Records against other national sides
Associate members
Opponent	M	W	L	T	NR	First match	First win
Belgium	1	0	1	0	0	31 July 2018	
Denmark	1	0	1	0	0	6 August 2018	
Gibraltar	1	1	0	0	0	27 July 2011	27 July 2011
France	1	1	0	0	0	26 July 2007	26 July 2007
Italy	1	0	1	0	0	28 July 2011	
Israel	1	0	1	0	0	2 August 2011	
Isle of Man	1	0	1	0	0	1 August 2011	
Netherlands	1	0	1	0	0	3 August 2018	
Norway	1	0	1	0	0	2 August 2011	

== Tournament summary ==
=== ICC Under-19 Cricket World Cup ===
ICC Under-19 World Cup records
Year	Round	Position	GP	W	L	T	NR
(Australia) 1988	Did not qualify						
(South Africa) 1998	Did not qualify						
(Sri Lanka) 2000	Did not qualify						
(New Zealand) 2002	Did not qualify						
(Bangladesh) 2004	Did not qualify						
(Sri Lanka) 2006	Did not qualify						
(Malaysia) 2008	Did not qualify						
(New Zealand) 2010	Did not qualify						
(Australia) 2012	Did not qualify						
(United Arab Emirates) 2014	Did not qualify						
(Bangladesh) 2016	Did not qualify						
(New Zealand) 2018	Did not qualify						
(South Africa) 2020	Did not qualify						
(Cricket West Indies) 2022	Did not qualify						
(South Africa) 2024	Did not qualify						
(Namibia) (Zimbabwe) 2026	To be determined						
Total	0/15	–	0	0	0	0	0

=== ICC Under-19 Cricket World Cup qualification ===
ICC Under-19 Cricket World Cup qualification records
Year	Round	Position	GP	W	L	T	NR
(Jersey) 2018	Did not participate						
(England) 2020	DNQ	–	4	0	4	0	0
(Scotland) 2022	The tournament was postponed due to COVID-19 pandemic						
(Guernsey) 2024	Did not participate						
(Denmark) 2026	Did not participate						
2028	To be determined						
Total	1/4	–	4	0	4	0	0

=== ICC Europe Under-19 Championship ===
ICC Europe Under-19 Championship records
Year	Round	Position	GP	W	L	T	NR
(Northern Ireland) 1999	The full data of the tournament have been found						
(England) 2000	The full data of the tournament have been found						
(Scotland) 2001	The full data of the tournament have been found						
(England) 2002	The full data of the tournament have been found						
(Netherlands) 2003	The full data of the tournament have been found						
(England) 2004	The full data of the tournament have been found						
(Scotland) 2005	The full data of the tournament have been found						
(Northern Ireland) 2006	The full data of the tournament have been found						
(Northern Ireland) 2007	The full data of the tournament have been found						
(Scotland) 2008	The full data of the tournament have been found						
(Jersey) 2009	The full data of the tournament have been found						
(Scotland) 2010	The full data of the tournament have been found						
(Jersey) 2013	The full data of the tournament have been found						
(Jersey) 2015	Did not participate						
Total	0/14	–	0	0	0	0	0

== See also ==
- Spain women's national cricket team
- Spain national cricket team
