= Norway national under-19 cricket team =

Personnel
- Captain: Hayatullah Niazi
- Coach: Mohammad Haroon
- Owner: Norwegian Cricket Board (NCB)

History
- List A debut: v. Denmark at King William's College, Castletown, Isle of Man; 28 July 2011

International Cricket Council
- ICC status: Affiliate (2000); Associate member (2017)
- ICC region: European Cricket Council (ECC)

The Norway Under-19 cricket team represents Norway in U-19 international cricket. The team is controlled by Norwegian Cricket Board (NCB). The team have not yet qualified for the ICC Under-19 Cricket World Cup

== History ==
The Norway national under-19 cricket team have played their debut game against Denmark on 28 July 2011 at King William's College, Castletown, Isle of Man. Since then the team have been playing qualification round of ICC Under-19 Cricket World Cup but have not qualified yet in the main tournament.

== Current squad ==
The following players are recently called up for the 2026 Under-19 Cricket World Cup qualification.

As of 29 April 2025

Name	Date of birth	Batting style	Bowling style
Hayatullah Niazi (Captain)	1 October 2002	Right hand bat	Right arm offbreak
Mohammad Omar Hanif	22 February 2003	Right hand bat	Right arm medium fast
Raryan Raheel	29 March 2003	Right hand bat	Right arm medium fast
Kabir Mangal	28 September 2000	Right Hand bat	Right arm medium fast
Saim Khan	25 December 2002	Right hand bat	Right arm medium fast
Saifullah Muhammad Malik (Vice-Captain)	21 December 2002	Right Hand bat	Right arm medium fast
Shafiullah Ahmadzai	5 September 2000	Right hand bat	Right arm medium fast
Nakkash Baig	11 March 2002	Right hand bat	Right arm Offbreak
Sahib Singh Gill Khera	21 June 2003	Right hand bat	Right arm Offbreak
Qased Ahmed Rajput	25 February 2002	Right hand bat Wicketkeeper	
Aman Sarna	16 December 2002	Right hand bat	Right arm medium fast

== Records & statistics ==
International match summary

As of 9 May 2025

Playing records
Format	M	W	L	T	D/NR	Inaugural match
Youth Oneday International	10	5	5	0	0	27 July 2011

As of 4 October 2024

Records against other national sides
Associate members
Opponent	M	W	L	T	NR	First match	First win
Belgium	2	2	0	0	0	1 August 2011	1 August 2011
Denmark	2	0	2	0	0	27 July 2011	
France	1	0	1	0	0	31 July 2018	
Germany	1	1	0	0	0	2 August 2011	2 August 2011
Israel	1	0	1	0	0	29 July 2011	
Italy	1	1	0	0	0	8 August 2018	8 August 2018
Netherlands	1	0	1	0	0	31 July 2018	
Spain	1	1	0	0	0	1 August 2018	1 August 2018

== Tournament summary ==
=== ICC Under-19 Cricket World Cup ===
ICC Under-19 World Cup records
Year	Round	Position	GP	W	L	T	NR
(Australia) 1988	Did not qualify						
(South Africa) 1998	Did not qualify						
(Sri Lanka) 2000	Did not qualify						
(New Zealand) 2002	Did not qualify						
(Bangladesh) 2004	Did not qualify						
(Sri Lanka) 2006	Did not qualify						
(Malaysia) 2008	Did not qualify						
(New Zealand) 2010	Did not qualify						
(Australia) 2012	Did not qualify						
(United Arab Emirates) 2014	Did not qualify						
(Bangladesh) 2016	Did not qualify						
(New Zealand) 2018	Did not qualify						
(South Africa) 2020	Did not qualify						
(Cricket West Indies) 2022	Did not qualify						
(South Africa) 2024	Did not qualify						
(Namibia) (Zimbabwe) 2026	To be determined						
Total	0/15	–	0	0	0	0	0

=== ICC Under-19 Cricket World Cup qualification ===
ICC Under-19 Cricket World Cup qualification records
Year	Round	Position	GP	W	L	T	NR
(Jersey) 2018	Did not participate						
(England) 2020	DNQ	–	4	2	2	0	0
(Scotland) 2022	The tournament was postponed due to COVID-19 pandemic						
(Guernsey) 2024	DNQ	–	4	2	2	0	0
(Denmark) 2026	DNQ	–	5	0	5	0	0
2028	To be determined						
Total	3/4	0 Title	13	4	9	0	0

=== ICC Europe Under-19 Championship ===
ICC Europe Under-19 Championship records
Year	Round	Position	GP	W	L	T	NR
(Northern Ireland) 1999	The full data of the tournament have been found						
(England) 2000	The full data of the tournament have been found						
(Scotland) 2001	The full data of the tournament have been found						
(England) 2002	The full data of the tournament have been found						
(Netherlands) 2003	The full data of the tournament have been found						
(England) 2004	The full data of the tournament have been found						
(Scotland) 2005	The full data of the tournament have been found						
(Northern Ireland) 2006	The full data of the tournament have been found						
(Northern Ireland) 2007	The full data of the tournament have been found						
(Scotland) 2008	The full data of the tournament have been found						
(Jersey) 2009	The full data of the tournament have been found						
(Scotland) 2010	The full data of the tournament have been found						
(Jersey) 2013	The full data of the tournament have been found						
(Jersey) 2015	Did not participate						
Total	0/14	–	0	0	0	0	0
