= 2018 Under-19 Cricket World Cup qualification =

The 2018 Under-19 Cricket World Cup in New Zealand was contested by sixteen teams, eleven of which qualified automatically. The other five places in the tournament were determined by a series of regional qualifiers, with one place being granted to each International Cricket Council (ICC) development region (Africa, the Americas, Asia, East Asia-Pacific, and Europe). The ten full members of the ICC qualified automatically, along with Namibia, the highest-placed associate member at the 2016 tournament.

== Automatic qualification ==
The ten full members of the ICC as at 2016 qualified automatically for the Under-19 World Cup. In early 2016, it was determined that the top-placed ICC associate member at the 2016 Under-19 World Cup in Bangladesh would also qualify automatically for the 2018 event. That team was Namibia, which defeated another associate member, Nepal, in the seventh-place play-off.

== Regional qualification ==
=== Africa ===
==== Division Two ====
The Africa Division Two tournament was played in Benoni, South Africa, from 10 to 18 September 2016. Ghana (the winner) and Botswana (the runner-up) both qualified for Division One.

Qualified for Division One

Team	Pld	W	L	T	NR	Pts	NRR
Ghana	6	6	0	0	0	12	+2.036
Botswana	6	4	2	0	0	8	+1.298
Nigeria	6	4	2	0	0	8	+1.175
Sierra Leone	6	4	2	0	0	8	+1.025
Zambia	6	2	4	0	0	4	–1.115
Tanzania	6	1	5	0	0	2	–1.106
Rwanda	6	0	6	0	0	0	–2.999

List of matches

10 September
Scorecard

Zambia; 150 (39.5 overs)	v	Nigeria; 151/2 (34.5 overs)

Nigeria won by 8 wickets
Willowmoore Park, Benoni

10 September
Scorecard

Botswana; 120 (46 overs)	v	Ghana; 121/2 (31.2 overs)

Ghana won by 8 wickets
Willowmoore Park, Benoni

10 September
Scorecard

Tanzania; 156 (42.2 overs)	v	Sierra Leone; 158/3 (39.2 overs)

Sierra Leone won by 7 wickets
Willowmoore Park, Benoni

11 September
Scorecard

Ghana; 108 (40.4 overs)	v	Sierra Leone; 105 (34.4 overs)

Ghana won by 3 runs
Willowmoore Park, Benoni

11 September
Scorecard

Nigeria; 278/3 (50 overs)	v	Rwanda; 33 (13 overs)

Nigeria won by 245 runs
Willowmoore Park, Benoni

11 September
Scorecard

Tanzania; 68 (29.1 overs)	v	Zambia; 71/7 (31.1 overs)

Zambia won by 3 wickets
Willowmoore Park, Benoni

12 September
Scorecard

Zambia; 48 (28.2 overs)	v	Ghana; 50/2 (12 overs)

Ghana won by 8 wickets
Willowmoore Park, Benoni

12 September
Scorecard

Nigeria; 209 (48.3 overs)	v	Sierra Leone; 160/9 (50 overs)

Nigeria won by 49 runs
Willowmoore Park, Benoni

12 September
Scorecard

Botswana; 301/4 (50 overs)	v	Rwanda; 105 (28 overs)

Botswana won by 196 runs
Willowmoore Park, Benoni

14 September
Scorecard

Botswana; 216/6 (50 overs)	v	Tanzania; 157 (34.3 overs)

Botswana won by 59 runs
Willowmoore Park, Benoni

14 September
Scorecard

Zambia; 65 (24.3 overs)	v	Sierra Leone; 66/4 (15.5 overs)

Sierra Leone won by 6 wickets
Willowmoore Park, Benoni

14 September
Scorecard

Rwanda; 52 (23.4 overs)	v	Ghana; 53/4 (12.2 overs)

Ghana won by 6 wickets
Willowmoore Park, Benoni

15 September
Scorecard

Rwanda; 147 (38 overs)	v	Zambia; 148/7 (45.4 overs)

Zambia won by 3 wickets
Willowmoore Park, Benoni

15 September
Scorecard

Ghana; 194 (49.1 overs)	v	Tanzania; 74 (29.3 overs)

Ghana won by 120 runs
Willowmoore Park, Benoni

15 September
Scorecard

Nigeria; 101 (39.3 overs)	v	Botswana; 103/9 (31.5 overs)

Botswana won by 1 wicket
Willowmoore Park, Benoni

17 September
Scorecard

Botswana; 201 (47 overs)	v	Sierra Leone; 202/4 (39.2 overs)

Sierra Leone won by 6 wickets
Willowmoore Park, Benoni

17 September
Scorecard

Tanzania; 134 (34.4 overs)	v	Rwanda; 44 (21.4 overs)

Tanzania won by 90 runs
Willowmoore Park, Benoni

17 September
Scorecard

Nigeria; 27 (15.4 overs)	v	Ghana; 28/0 (4.3 overs)

Ghana won by 10 wickets
Willowmoore Park, Benoni

18 September
Scorecard

Tanzania; 46 (23.3 overs)	v	Nigeria; 48/1 (6.2 overs)

Nigeria won by 9 wickets
Willowmoore Park, Benoni

18 September
Scorecard

Zambia; 76 (32.3 overs)	v	Botswana; 77/3 (15.4 overs)

Botswana won by 7 wickets
Willowmoore Park, Benoni

18 September
Scorecard

Rwanda; 91 (38.3 overs)	v	Sierra Leone; 92/3 (12 overs)

Sierra Leone won by 7 wickets
Willowmoore Park, Benoni

==== Division One ====
The Africa Division One tournament was played in Nairobi, Kenya, from 1–10 July 2017. Kenya won the tournament on net run rate from Uganda to qualify for their first World Cup since 2002; four African teams played in the World Cup for the first time since 2006.

Qualified for 2018 World Cup

Team	Pld	W	L	T	NR	Pts	NRR
Kenya	6	5	1	0	0	10	tba
Uganda	6	5	1	0	0	10	tba
Ghana	6	2	4	0	0	4	tba
Botswana	6	0	6	0	0	0	tba

=== Americas ===
ICC U19 World Cup Qualifier Americas Region was played in Toronto, Canada from July 17 to July 23, 2017. Teams were Bermuda, Canada, and USA, and format was a double round robin. Canada qualified for the 2019 ICC U19 World Cup in New Zealand on Net Run Rate.

Qualified for the 2018 Under-19 World Cup.

Team	Pld	W	L	T	NR	Pts	NRR
Canada	4	3	1	0	0	6	+1.305
United States	4	3	1	0	0	6	+1.162
Bermuda	4	0	4	0	0	0	-2.989

=== Asia ===
==== Division Two ====
The Asia Division Two tournament was played in Kuala Lumpur, Malaysia, from 26 September to 6 October 2016, and featured ten teams. Malaysia defeated Singapore in the final, with both teams qualifying for Division One.

Points Table

Group A

Team	Pld	W	L	T	NR	Pts	NRR
Malaysia	4	4	0	0	0	8	+1.766
Singapore	4	3	1	0	0	6	+1.701
Saudi Arabia	4	2	2	0	0	4	+0.154
Qatar	4	1	3	0	0	2	-1.044
Bahrain	4	0	4	0	0	0	-2.134

Group B

Team	Pld	W	L	T	NR	Pts	NRR
Hong Kong	4	4	0	0	0	8	+2.341
United Arab Emirates	4	3	1	0	0	6	+2.253
Kuwait	4	2	2	0	0	4	-0.685
Oman	4	1	3	0	0	2	-0.536
Thailand	4	0	4	0	0	0	-2.893

==== Division One ====
The Asia Division One tournament was played in Singapore in July 2017.

Afghanistan and Nepal, teams who played on last Under 19 World Cup were joined by two finalist of 2016 ICC Under-19 Cricket World Cup Asia Qualifier Division Two, Singapore and Malaysia. Afghanistan win this tournament by win of 6 out of 6game while Nepal win 4 matches out of 6 matches and Afghanistan was qualified for 2018 u-19 cricket world cup held in New Zealand .

=== East Asia-Pacific ===
The East Asia-Pacific regional qualifier was held in Apia, Samoa, from 8–16 August 2017. Four teams took part in a double round-robin: Fiji, Papua New Guinea, Samoa, and Vanuatu.

=== Europe ===
==== Division Two ====
The Europe Division Two tournament was played in the Netherlands from 23 to 30 July 2016. It was won by Denmark.

Qualified for Division One

Team	Pld	W	L	T	NR	Pts	NRR
Denmark	6	6	0	0	0	12	+2.973
Netherlands	6	3	3	0	0	6	+0.302
Guernsey	6	3	3	0	0	6	–0.326
Italy	6	0	6	0	0	0	–2.595

List of matches

23 July
Scorecard

Netherlands; 170 (50 overs)	v	Denmark; 171/3 (35 overs)

Denmark won by 7 wickets
Hazelaarweg Stadion, Rotterdam

23 July
Scorecard

Guernsey; 171 (40.2 overs)	v	Italy; 156 (48.3 overs)

Guernsey won by 15 runs
VRA Ground, Amstelveen

24 July
Scorecard

Denmark; 243 (43.3 overs)	v	Guernsey; 128 (34.1 overs)

Denmark won by 115 runs
Hazelaarweg Stadion, Rotterdam

24 July
Scorecard

Netherlands; 197/7 (50 overs)	v	Italy; 74 (39.4 overs)

Netherlands won by 123 runs
Sportpark Het Schootsveld, Deventer

26 July
Scorecard

Guernsey; 211/9 (50 overs)	v	Netherlands; 159 (43.4 overs)

Guernsey won by 52 runs
Sportpark Thurlede, Schiedam

26 July
Scorecard

Denmark; 280/5 (50 overs)	v	Italy; 108 (40.2 overs)

Denmark won by 172 runs
VRA Ground, Amstelveen

28 July
Scorecard

Italy; 93 (36.1 overs)	v	Guernsey; 94/6 (18.5 overs)

Guernsey won by 4 wickets
Sportpark Thurlede, Schiedam

28 July
Scorecard

Netherlands; 84 (31.3 overs)	v	Denmark; 85/3 (20.3 overs)

Denmark won by 7 wickets
VRA Ground, Amstelveen

29 July
Scorecard

Guernsey; 84 (41.3 overs)	v	Denmark; 88/4 (16.1 overs)

Denmark won by 6 wickets
Sportpark Thurlede, Schiedam

29 July
Scorecard

Netherlands; 250/8 (50 overs)	v	Italy; 107 (37 overs)

Netherlands won by 143 runs
Hazelaarweg Stadion, Rotterdam

30 July
Scorecard

Italy; 54 (35.3 overs)	v	Denmark; 55/2 (10.2 overs)

Denmark won by 8 wickets
Sportpark Thurlede, Schiedam

30 July
Scorecard

Netherlands; 231 (47.3 overs)	v	Guernsey; 204 (47.2 overs)

Netherlands won by 27 runs
Hazelaarweg Stadion, Rotterdam

==== Division One ====
The Europe Division One tournament was played in Jersey from 23 July to 1 August 2017. The four participating teams were Denmark, Ireland, Jersey, and Scotland.
