= Harlow Sportcentre =

Cricket ground in Harlow, Essex, England

Coordinates: 51.7761°N 0.0921°E

- Interactive map of Harlow Sportcentre

Ground information
- Location: Harlow, Essex
- Country: England
- Establishment: 1964 (first recorded match)

Team information
Essex	(1969–1974 & 1982)
- As of 12 September 2010; Source: Ground profile

Harlow Sportcentre was a cricket ground in Harlow, Essex. The first recorded match on the ground was in 1964, when the Essex Second XI played the Warwickshire Second XI in the Second XI Championship.

Essex played 2 first-class matches there in 1970 against Cambridge University and Kent.

In addition, the ground has also hosted List-A matches. The first List-A match there came in the 1969 Player's County League and saw Essex play Worcestershire. From 1969 to 1982, the ground held 7 List-A matches, the last of which saw Essex play Leicestershire in the 1982 John Player League.
