= Cricket Field Lane =

Cricket ground in Bishop's Stortford, England

Coordinates: 51°52′39″N 0°09′04″E

Cricketfield Lane
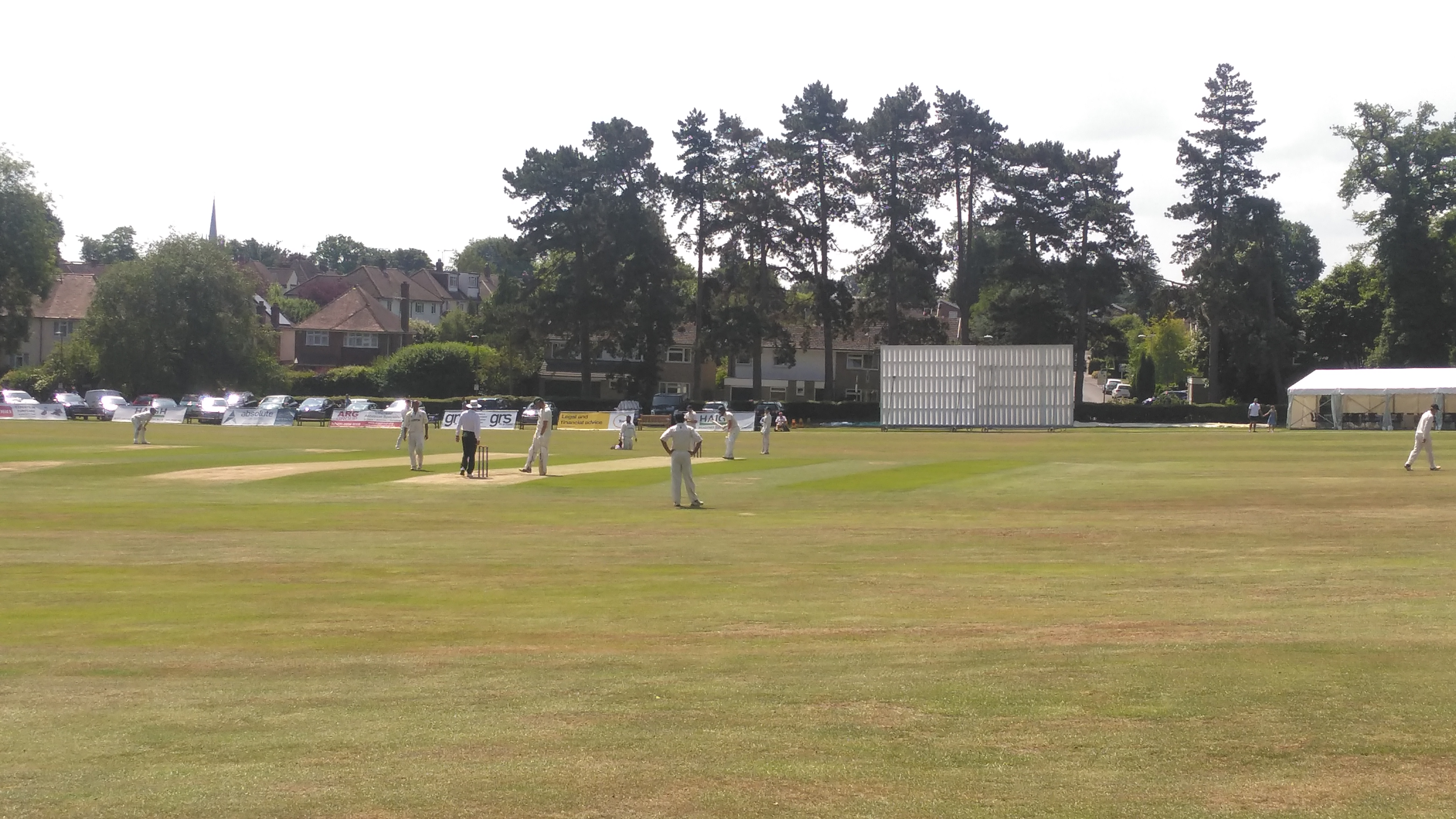
- Interactive map of Cricketfield Lane

Ground information
- Location: Bishop's Stortford, Hertfordshire
- Country: England
- Establishment: 1862

Team information
Hertfordshire	(1895–present)
- As of 23 July 2010; Source: Ground profile

Cricketfield Lane is a cricket ground in Bishop's Stortford, Hertfordshire. The earliest recorded match on the ground was in 1862 between Bishop's Stortford and an All England Eleven. In 1895 Hertfordshire played their first Minor Counties Championship match on the ground, which came against Norfolk. From 1895 to the present day, the ground has played host to 54 Minor Counties Championship matches and 6 MCCA Knockout Trophy matches.

The ground has hosted a single first-class match, which came in 1872 when a United South of England Eleven played a United North of England Eleven.

The first List-A match played on the ground came in the 1991 NatWest Trophy between Hertfordshire and Derbyshire. The second and final List-A match played at the ground was between Hertfordshire and Ireland in the 2004 Cheltenham & Gloucester Trophy.

The Essex Second XI has also used the ground for a number of matches. In local domestic cricket, Cricket Field Lane is the home ground of Bishop's Stortford Cricket Club who play in the Home Counties Premier Cricket League.

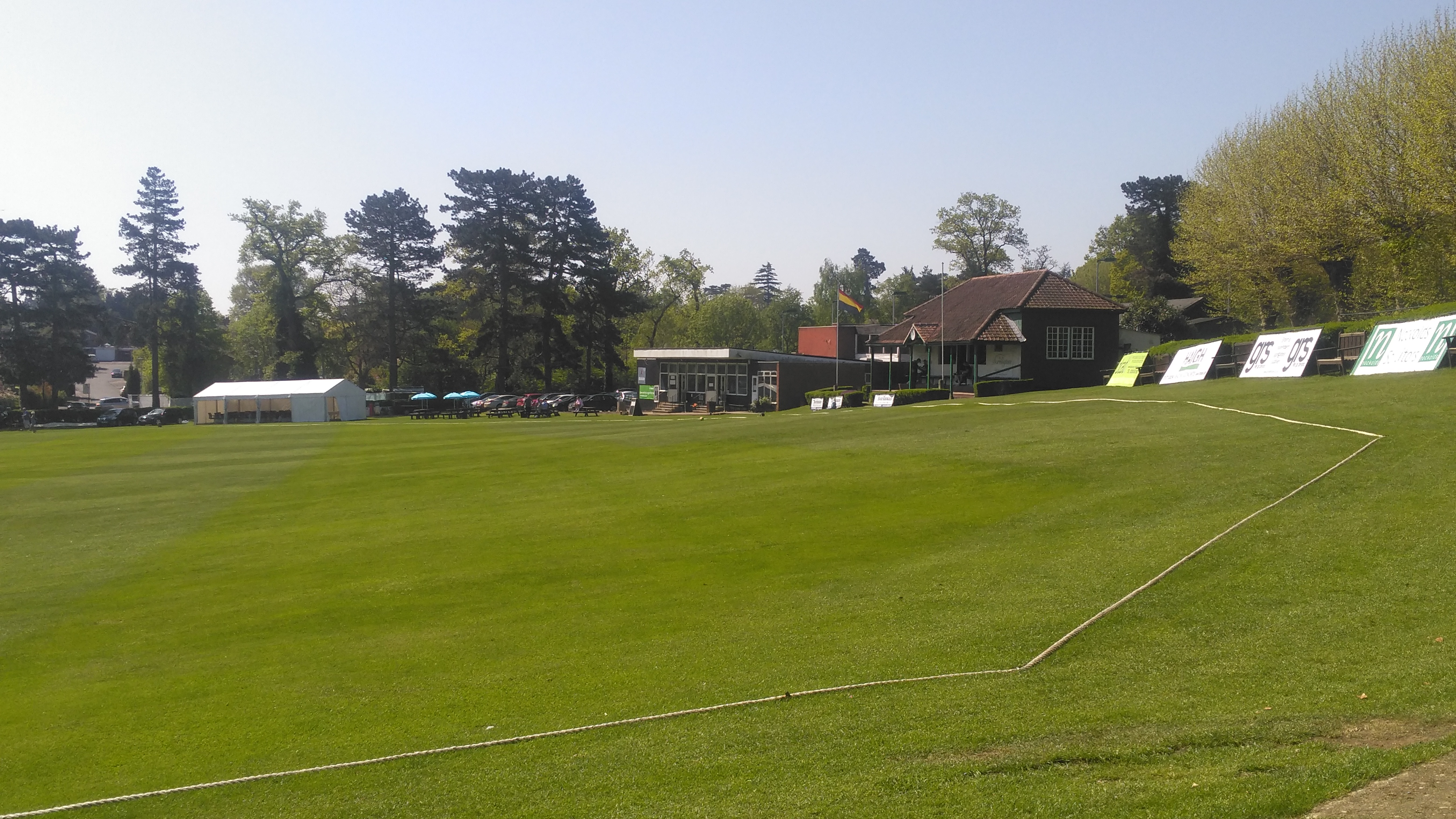
Pavilion and clubhouse at Cricket Field Lane
