= Botswana national under-19 cricket team =

Cricket team

Botswana under-19 cricket team

Personnel
- Captain: Ameer Saiyed
- Coach: Reginald Nehonde
- Owner: Botswana Cricket Association (BCA)

History
- List A debut: v. Nigeria Willowmoore Park Benoni, South Africa; 25 August 2007

International Cricket Council
- ICC status: Associate member (2005)
- ICC region: Africa Cricket Association (ACA)

The Botswana national under-19 cricket team represents Botswana in under-19 international cricket. The team is controlled by Botswana Cricket Association (BCA).

== Current squad ==
The following players are recently called up for the 2026 Under-19 Cricket World Cup qualification.

As of 20 July 2024

Name	Date of birth	Batting style	Bowling style
Jack Richards (Captain)		Right hand bat	
Aryan Pattamana		Right hand bat	Right arm medium
Monroux Kasselman		Right hand bat	Right arm medium
Amaan Parekh		Right Hand bat	Right arm medium
Ayaan Chandra		Right hand bat	Right arm fast
Muhammed Chand		Right Hand bat	Right arm medium
Frederick Oosthuizen		Wicketkeeper/Batter	
Bernard Moloi		Right hand bat	Left arm fast medium
George Oosthuizen		Right hand bat	Right arm medium
Merrick Reed		Right hand bat	
Monroux Kasselman		Right hand bat	Right arm medium

== Records & statistics ==
International match summary

As of 7 August 2024

Playing records
Format	M	W	L	T	D/NR	Inaugural match
Youth One Day Internationals	19	6	13	0	0	25 August 2007

As of 7 August 2024

Records against other national sides
Associate members
Opponent	M	W	L	T	NR	First match	First win
Ghana	2	0	2	0	0	4 July 2017	
Kenya	4	0	4	0	0	25 May 2013	
Nigeria	2	2	0	0	0	26 May 2013	26 May 2013
Rwanda	1	1	0	0	0	20 August 2018	20 August 2018
Sierra Leone	2	1	1	0	0	28 May 2013	28 May 2013
Swaziland	1	1	0	0	0	29 August 2007	29 August 2007
Tanzania	2	0	2	0	0	2 July 2017	
Uganda	5	1	4	0	0	27 August 2007	27 August 2007

== Competitive records ==
=== ICC U19 Cricket World Cup ===
Botswana's U19 World Cup Record
Year	Result	Pos	№	Pld	W	L	T	NR
(Australia) 1988	Did not qualify							
(South Africa) 1998	Did not qualify							
(Sri Lanka) 2000	Did not qualify							
(New Zealand) 2002	Did not qualify							
(Bangladesh) 2004	Did not qualify							
(Sri Lanka) 2006	Did not qualify							
(Malaysia) 2008	Did not qualify							
(New Zealand) 2010	Did not qualify							
(Australia) 2012	Did not qualify							
(United Arab Emirates) 2014	Did not qualify							
(Bangladesh) 2016	Did not qualify							
(New Zealand) 2018	Did not qualify							
(South Africa) 2020	Did not qualify							
(Cricket West Indies) 2022	Did not qualify							
(South Africa) 2024	Did not qualify							
(Zimbabwe) (Namibia) 2026	Did not qualify							
Total	0 Title	0	0	0	0	0	0	0

=== ICC Africa Under-19 Championship ===
ICC Africa Under-19 Championship records
Year	Round	Position	GP	W	L	T	NR
(South Africa) 2007	Round-robin	–	3	2	1	0	0
(Namibia) 2010	Round-robin	3/8	7	4	3	0	0
(Uganda) 2013	Group stages	4/8	4	2	2	0	0
(Tanzania) 2015	Round-robin	6/6	5	1	4	0	0
Total	4/4	–	19	9	10	0	0

=== ICC Under-19 Cricket World Cup qualification ===
ICC Under-19 Cricket World Cup qualification records
Year	Round	Position	GP	W	L	T	NR
(South Africa) 2018	DNQ	–	12	4	8	0	0
(South Africa) 2020	DNQ	–	4	2	2	0	0
(South Africa) 2022	DNQ	–	4	2	2	0	0
(Nigeria) 2024	DNQ	–	3	0	3	0	0
(Tanzania) 2026	DNQ	–	3	1	2	0	0
2028	To be determined						
Total	5/5	–	26	9	17	0	0
