= Rwanda national under-19 cricket team =

Cricket team

Rwanda under-19 cricket team

Personnel
- Captain: Didier Ndikubwimana
- Coach: Leonard Nhamburo
- Owner: Rwanda Cricket Association (RCA)

History
- List A debut: v. Swaziland Senwes Park Potchefstroom, South Africa; 19 August 2018

International Cricket Council
- ICC status: Associate member (2017); Affiliate member (2003)
- ICC region: Africa

The Rwanda national under-19 cricket team represents Rwanda in under-19 international cricket. The team controlled by Rwanda Cricket Association (RCA).

== Current squad ==
The following players are recently called up for the 2026 Under-19 Cricket World Cup qualification.

As of 20 July 2024

| Name | Date of birth | Batting style | Bowling style |
|---|---|---|---|
| Didier Ndikubwimana (Captain) | 28 September 2003 | Wicketkeeper Batter | |
| Isae Niyomugabo | 20 September 2003 | Right hand bat | |
| Daniel Gumyusenge | 10 September 2003 | Right hand bat | Right arm fast medium |
| Oscar Manishimwe | 15 September 2002 | Right Hand bat | |
| Emile Rukiriza | 27 July 2003 | Right hand bat | Right arm offbreak |
| Parfait Mugisha | 28 May 2003 | Right Hand bat | Right arm medium |
| Christian Benihirwe | 9 March 2003 | Right hand bat | |
| Eric Kubwimana | 4 September 2002 | Right hand bat | Right arm fast medium |
| Steven Ntwari | 30 November 2004 | Left hand bat | Slow left arm orthodox |
| Seif Sulaiman Dushimirimana | 24 September 2002 | Right hand bat | Right arm offbreak |
| Jean Marie Vianney Ingabire | 1 January 2003 | Right hand bat | Right arm medium fast |

== Records & statistics ==
International match summary

As of 4 October 2021

Playing records
| Format | M | W | L | T | D/NR | Inaugural match |
| Youth One Day Internationals | 8 | 2 | 6 | 0 | 0 | 19 August 2018 |

As of 4 October 2021

Records against other national sides
Associate members
| Opponent | M | W | L | T | NR | First match | First win |
| Botswana | 1 | 0 | 1 | 0 | 0 | 20 August 2018 | |
| Nigeria | 1 | 1 | 0 | 0 | 0 | 1 October 2021 | 1 October 2021 |
| Namibia | 1 | 0 | 1 | 0 | 0 | 4 October 2021 | |
| Sierra Leone | 1 | 0 | 1 | 0 | 0 | 23 August 2018 | |
| Swaziland | 1 | 1 | 0 | 0 | 0 | 19 August 2018 | 19 August 2018 |
| Tanzania | 2 | 0 | 2 | 0 | 0 | 25 August 2018 | |
| Uganda | 1 | 0 | 1 | 0 | 0 | 27 August 2007 | |

== Competitive records ==
=== ICC Under-19 Cricket World Cup ===
ICC Under-19 World Cup records
| Year | Round | Position | GP | W | L | T | NR |
|---|---|---|---|---|---|---|---|
| (Australia) 1988 | Did not qualify | | | | | | |
| (South Africa) 1998 | Did not qualify | | | | | | |
| (Sri Lanka) 2000 | Did not qualify | | | | | | |
| (New Zealand) 2002 | Did not qualify | | | | | | |
| (Bangladesh) 2004 | Did not qualify | | | | | | |
| (Sri Lanka) 2006 | Did not qualify | | | | | | |
| (Malaysia) 2008 | Did not qualify | | | | | | |
| (New Zealand) 2010 | Did not qualify | | | | | | |
| (Australia) 2012 | Did not qualify | | | | | | |
| (United Arab Emirates) 2014 | Did not qualify | | | | | | |
| (Bangladesh) 2016 | Did not qualify | | | | | | |
| (New Zealand) 2018 | Did not qualify | | | | | | |
| (South Africa) 2020 | Did not qualify | | | | | | |
| (Cricket West Indies) 2022 | Did not qualify | | | | | | |
| (South Africa) 2024 | Did not qualify | | | | | | |
| (Namibia) (Zimbabwe) 2026 | To be determined | | | | | | |
| Total | 0/15 | 0 Title | 0 | 0 | 0 | 0 | 0 |

=== ICC Africa Under-19 Championship ===
ICC Africa Under-19 Championship records
| Year | Round | Position | GP | W | L | T | NR |
|---|---|---|---|---|---|---|---|
| (South Africa) 2007 | The full data of the tournament have not been found | | | | | | |
| (Namibia) 2010 | Round-robin | 2/5 | 4 | 3 | 1 | 0 | 0 |
| (Uganda) 2013 | Did not participate | | | | | | |
| (Tanzania) 2015 | Did not participate | | | | | | |
| Total | 4/4 | – | 19 | 9 | 10 | 0 | 0 |

=== ICC Under-19 Cricket World Cup qualification ===
ICC Under-19 Cricket World Cup qualification record
| Year | Round | Position | GP | W | L | T | NR |
|---|---|---|---|---|---|---|---|
| (South Africa) 2018 | DNQ | 7/7 | 6 | 0 | 6 | 0 | 0 |
| (South Africa) 2020 | DNQ | 4/5 | 4 | 1 | 3 | 0 | 0 |
| (South Africa) 2022 | The tournament was postponed due to COVID-19 pandemic | | | | | | |
| (Nigeria) 2024 | DNQ | – | 3 | 1 | 2 | 0 | 0 |
| (Tanzania) 2026 | DNQ | – | 3 | 1 | 2 | 0 | 0 |
| 2028 | To be determined | | | | | | |
| Total | 4/5 | – | 16 | 3 | 13 | 0 | 0 |
