= Nigeria national under-19 cricket team =

Cricket team

- One Day name: Junior Yellow Greens

Personnel
- Captain: Sylvester Okpe
- Coach: Uthe Ogbimi

History
- List A debut: v. Botswana Willowmoore Park Benoni, South Africa; 25 August 2007

International Cricket Council
- ICC status: Associate member (2005)
- ICC region: Africa Cricket Association (ACA)

The Nigeria Under-19 cricket team represents Nigeria in Under-19 cricket at the international level. The team administrated by Nigeria Cricket Federation (NCF). The team made their debut world cup in 2020 Under-19 Cricket World Cup.

== History ==
It took part in the 2020 Under-19 Cricket World Cup qualification ICC Africa Division One tournament, held in Namibia. Nigeria defeated pre-tournament favourites Namibia by 52 runs, Uganda by 30 runs and Kenya by 58 runs. Nigeria won the tournament and qualified for the 2020 Under-19 Cricket World Cup in South Africa for the first time. They finished in the 15th place at the tournament, out of 16 teams, beating Japan in the final placement match.

== Squad ==
Nigeria's squad for the 2020 U-19 World Cup was announced on 7 December 2019.

- Sylvester Okpe (c)
- Mohameed Taiwo (vc)
- Rasheed Abolarin
- Peter Aho
- Miracle Akhigbe
- Shehu Audu
- Oche Boniface
- Isaac Danladi
- Miracle Ikaige
- Akhere Isesele
- Abdulrahman Jimoh
- Samuel Mba
- Olayinka Olaleye
- Sulaimon Runsewe
- Ifeanyichukwu Uboh

== Records & statistics ==
International match summary

As of 7 August 2024

Playing records
Format	M	W	L	T	D/NR	Inaugural match
Youth One Day Internationals	29	13	16	0	0	25 August 2007

As of 7 August 2024

Records against other national sides
ICC Full members
Opponent	M	W	L	T	NR	First match	First win
Australia	1	0	1	0	0	20 January 2020	
England	1	0	1	0	0	25 January 2020	
Sri Lanka	1	0	1	0	0	27 January 2020	
West Indies	1	0	1	0	0	23 January 2020	
Associate members
Botswana	2	0	2	0	0	25 August 2007	
Ghana	1	1	0	0	0	19 August 2018	19 August 2018
Japan	1	1	0	0	0	1 February 2020	1 February 2020
Kenya	2	1	1	0	0	28 May 2013	18 March 2019
Lesotho	1	1	0	0	0	22 April 2018	22 April 2018
Mozambique	1	1	0	0	0	20 August 2018	20 August 2018
Namibia	2	1	1	0	0	17 March 2019	17 March 2019
Rwanda	1	0	1	0	0	1 October 2021	
Sierra Leone	3	3	0	0	0	27 May 2013	27 May 2013
Tanzania	5	2	3	0	0	27 August 2007	27 August 2007
Uganda	3	1	2	0	0	26 August 2007	20 March 2019
United Arab Emirates	1	0	1	0	0	30 January 2020	
Zambia	2	1	1	0	0	29 August 2007	30 May 2013

== Competitive records ==
=== ICC Under-19 Cricket World Cup ===
ICC Under-19 World Cup records
Year	Round	Position	GP	W	L	T	NR
(Australia) 1988	Did not qualify						
(South Africa) 1998	Did not qualify						
(Sri Lanka) 2000	Did not qualify						
(New Zealand) 2002	Did not qualify						
(Bangladesh) 2004	Did not qualify						
(Sri Lanka) 2006	Did not qualify						
(Malaysia) 2008	Did not qualify						
(New Zealand) 2010	Did not qualify						
(Australia) 2012	Did not qualify						
(United Arab Emirates) 2014	Did not qualify						
(Bangladesh) 2016	Did not qualify						
(New Zealand) 2018	Did not qualify						
(South Africa) 2020	Group stages	15/16	3	0	3	0	0
(Cricket West Indies) 2022	Did not qualify						
(South Africa) 2024	Did not qualify						
(Namibia) (Zimbabwe) 2026	To be determined						
Total	1/15	0 Title	3	0	3	0	0

=== ICC Africa Under-19 Championship ===
ICC Africa Under-19 Championship records
Year	Round	Position	GP	W	L	T	NR
(South Africa) 2007	The full data of the tournament have not been found						
(Namibia) 2010	Group stage	–	4	4	0	0	0
(Uganda) 2013	Round-robin	–	3	1	2	0	0
(Tanzania) 2015	Round-robin	–	5	2	3	0	0
Total	3/4	0 Title	12	7	5	0	0

=== ICC Under-19 Cricket World Cup qualification ===
ICC Under-19 Cricket World Cup qualification record
Year	Round	Position	GP	W	L	T	NR
(South Africa) 2018	DNQ	3/7	6	0	6	0	0
(Namibia) 2020	Qualified	4/5	5	5	0	0	0
(South Africa) 2022	The tournament was postponed due to COVID-19 pandemic						
(Nigeria) 2024	DNQ	–	3	1	2	0	0
(Tanzania) 2026	DNQ	–	5	3	2	0	0
2028	To be determined						
Total	4/4	1 Title	19	9	10	0	0
