= Mozambique national under-19 cricket team =

Under-19 cricket team

Mozambique Under-19 cricket team
- Association: Mozambican Cricket Association (MCA)

Personnel
- Captain: Manuel Marta Bembele
- Coach: (Mozambique) Sol de Carvalho Mian

History
- List A debut: v. Lesotho at JB Marks Oval Potchefstroom, South Africa; 19 August 2018

International Cricket Council
- ICC region: Africa (ACA)

The Mozambique under-19 cricket team represents Mozambique in international under-19 men's cricket. The team is administered by the Mozambican Cricket Association (MCA).

== Current squad ==
| Name | Date of birth | Playing role |
|---|---|---|
| Antonio Augusto Laice | 20 August 2004 | Batter |
| Eugenio Ibraimo Azine | 27 March 2004 | Batter |
| Agostinho Navicha | 29 December 2003 | Batter |
| Manuel Eduardo Mbebe Jr | 7 September 2004 | Batter |
| Manuel Marta Bembele Captain | 6 May 2003 | Bowler |
| Julio Joao Chicuele | 20 April 2004 | All Rounder |
| Quelido Uqueio | 30 December 2004 | Batter |
| Chali Magaia Vice-captain | 4 January 2003 | All Rounder |
| Jose Julio Manjate | 9 February 2005 | Bowler |
| Filipe Nelson | 28 August 2003 | Batter |
| Sidney Helena Marregula | 13 May 2004 | Wicketkeeper |
| Emerson Ndevale | 22 October 2003 | Bowler |

== Records & statistics ==
International match summary

As of 28 August 2018

Playing records
| Format | M | W | L | T | D/NR | Inaugural match |
| Youth One day Internationals | 5 | 2 | 3 | 0 | 0 | 19 August 2018 |

As of 28 August 2018

Records against other national sides
Associate members
| Opponent | M | W | L | T | NR | First match | First win |
| Ghana | 1 | 1 | 0 | 0 | 0 | 22 August 2018 | 22 August 2018 |
| Lesotho | 1 | 1 | 0 | 0 | 0 | 19 August 2018 | 19 August 2018 |
| Nigeria | 1 | 0 | 1 | 0 | 0 | 20 August 2018 | |
| Sierra Leone | 1 | 0 | 1 | 0 | 0 | 26 August 2018 | |
| Tanzania | 1 | 0 | 1 | 0 | 0 | 28 August 2018 | |

== ICC U19 Cricket World Cup ==
Mozambique's U19 World Cup Record
| Year | Result | Pos | № | Pld | W | L | T | NR |
|---|---|---|---|---|---|---|---|---|
| (Australia) 1988 | Did not qualify | | | | | | | |
| (South Africa) 1998 | Did not qualify | | | | | | | |
| (Sri Lanka) 2000 | Did not qualify | | | | | | | |
| (New Zealand) 2002 | Did not qualify | | | | | | | |
| (Bangladesh) 2004 | Did not qualify | | | | | | | |
| (Sri Lanka) 2006 | Did not qualify | | | | | | | |
| (Malaysia) 2008 | Did not qualify | | | | | | | |
| (New Zealand) 2010 | Did not qualify | | | | | | | |
| (Australia) 2012 | Did not qualify | | | | | | | |
| (United Arab Emirates) 2014 | Did not qualify | | | | | | | |
| (Bangladesh) 2016 | Did not qualify | | | | | | | |
| (New Zealand) 2018 | Did not qualify | | | | | | | |
| (South Africa) 2020 | Did not qualify | | | | | | | |
| (Cricket West Indies) 2022 | Did not qualify | | | | | | | |
| (South Africa) 2024 | Did not qualify | | | | | | | |
| (Zimbabwe) (Namibia) 2026 | To be determined | | | | | | | |
| Total | 0 Title | 0 | 0 | 0 | 0 | 0 | 0 | 0 |

== ICC U19 Cricket World Cup Africa Qualifiers ==
Mozambique's U19 World Cup Africa Qualifiers Record
| Year | Result | Pos | № | Pld | W | L | T | NR |
|---|---|---|---|---|---|---|---|---|
| (South Africa) 2020 | DNQ | 4/9 | 9 | 5 | 2 | 3 | 0 | 0 |
| Total | 0 Title | 0 | 0 | 5 | 2 | 3 | 0 | 0 |
