= Bhutan Cricket Council Board =

Governing body of cricket in Bhutan

- Sport: Cricket
- Jurisdiction: Bhutan
- Abbreviation: BCCB
- Founded: 2001
- Affiliation: International Cricket Council (ICC)
- Headquarters: Thimphu
- President: Thinley Wangchuk Dorji

Official website
- www.cricketbhutan.org
- (Bhutan)

Bhutan Cricket Council Board is the official governing body of the sport of cricket in Bhutan. Its current headquarters is in Thimphu, Bhutan. Bhutan Cricket Council Board is Bhutan's representative at the International Cricket Council (ICC) and has been an affiliate member of that body since 2001 and an associate member since 2017. It is also a member of the Asian Cricket Council.

== Grounds ==
The Gelephu International Cricket Ground is located in Gelephu, Bhutan.

Location of international cricket matches played in Bhutan

== See also ==
- Bhutan national cricket team
- Bhutan women's national cricket team
- Bhutan national under-19 cricket team
- Bhutan women's national under-19 cricket team
