= Sportpark Thurlede =

Cricket ground in Schiedam, Netherlands

Coordinates: 51°55′47.46″N 04°23′40.77″E

Ground information
- Location: Schiedam, Netherlands
- Establishment: 1995 (first recorded match)
- Capacity: Unknown

International information
- First ODI: 9 July 2010: Canada v Kenya
- Last ODI: 10 July 2010: Canada v Kenya
- Only WODI: 23 July 2003: Scotland v West Indies
- As of 3 September 2020; Source: Ground profile

Sportpark Thurlede is a cricket ground in Schiedam, Netherlands. The first recorded match on the ground was played in 1996 when the Netherlands played Somerset in a friendly. The ground later held a single Women's One Day International in 2003 between Scotland Women played West Indies Women in the IWCC Trophy.

The Netherlands hosted the 2010 World Cricket League Division One tournament, with two One Day Internationals being played there, both matches being between Canada and Kenya. These matches also hold List A status, with the ground hosting two more List A matches later in 2010 when the ground hosted two matches in the 2010 Clydesdale Bank 40. In these the Netherlands played Derbyshire and Yorkshire.

The ground is used by Excelsior 20 Cricket Club.
