= Ghana national under-19 cricket team =

Cricket team

Ghana under-19 cricket team

Personnel
- Captain: Joseph Adotei
- Owner: Ghana Cricket Association

History
- List A debut: v. Zambia Willowmoore Park Benoni, South Africa; 25 August 2007

The Ghana national under-19 cricket team represents Ghana in under-19 international cricket. The team is controlled by Ghana Cricket Association (GCA).

== Current squad ==
The following players have been called up for the national team.

As of 20 August 2018

Name	Date of birth	Batting style	Bowling style
Joseph Adotei (Captain)	31 July 2001	Right hand bat	Right arm medium
Abraham Quaye	8 May 2002	Right hand bat	Legspinner
Mills Yaotse	2 January 2002	Left hand bat	
Obed Taylor	19 December 2003	Right Hand bat	
Bless Bakodie	30 May 2002	Right hand bat	Right arm fast
Eric Amoah	23 September 2003	Right Hand bat	
Richmond Baaleri	16 August 2002	Right hand Bat	Right arm Offbreak
Paul Ayoleyine	20 October 2005	Right hand bat	Right arm medium
Jerry Gbafah	4 May 2004		Left arm medium
David Pereira	16 September 2000	Right hand bat	Right arm fast
Aaron Boamah	30 November 2003		Right arm fast

== Records & statistics ==
International match summary

As of 22 August 2018

Playing records
Format	M	W	L	T	D/NR	Inaugural match
Youth One Day Internationals	14	4	10	0	0	25 August 2007

As of 22 August 2018

Records against other national sides
Associate members
Opponent	M	W	L	T	NR	First match	First win
Botswana	2	2	0	0	0	4 July 2017	4 July 2007
Kenya	3	0	3	0	0	1 July 2017	
Lesotho	1	1	0	0	0	20 August 2018	20 August 2018
Mozambique	1	0	1	0	0	22 August 2018	
Namibia	1	0	1	0	0	27 August 2007	
Nigeria	1	0	1	0	0	19 August 2018	
Tanzania	1	1	0	0	0	29 August 2007	29 August 2007
Uganda	2	0	2	0	0	2 July 2017	
Zambia	1	0	1	0	0	30 August 2007	

== ICC U19 Cricket World Cup ==
Ghana's U19 World Cup Record
Year	Result	Pos	№	Pld	W	L	T	NR
(Australia) 1988	Did not qualify							
(South Africa) 1998	Did not qualify							
(Sri Lanka) 2000	Did not qualify							
(New Zealand) 2002	Did not qualify							
(Bangladesh) 2004	Did not qualify							
(Sri Lanka) 2006	Did not qualify							
(Malaysia) 2008	Did not qualify							
(New Zealand) 2010	Did not qualify							
(Australia) 2012	Did not qualify							
(United Arab Emirates) 2014	Did not qualify							
(Bangladesh) 2016	Did not qualify							
(New Zealand) 2018	Did not qualify							
(South Africa) 2020	Did not qualify							
(Cricket West Indies) 2022	Did not qualify							
(South Africa) 2024	Did not qualify							
(Zimbabwe) (Namibia) 2026	To be determined							
Total	0 Title	0	0	0	0	0	0	0
