= Denmark national under-19 cricket team =

Denmark

Personnel
- Captain: Abdullah Mahmood

The Denmark Under-19 cricket team represents the country of Denmark in U-19 international cricket. They are controlled by Danish Cricket Federation, the official governing body of the sport of cricket in Denmark.

Denmark played their first Under-19 fixture against the Netherlands Under-19 in The Hague in 1975. The team played 6 youth One Day Internationals during the ICC Under-19 Cricket World Cup. These were the team's only youth One Day International appearances, as well as their only Under-19 World Cup appearance.

== Under-19 World Cup record ==
Denmark's U19 World Cup record
Year	Result	Pos	№	Pld	W	L	T	NR
(Australia) 1988	Part of ICC Associates XI							
(South Africa) 1998	First round	13th	16	6	2	4	0	0
(Sri Lanka) 2000	Did not qualify							
(New Zealand) 2002	Did not qualify							
(Bangladesh) 2004	Did not qualify							
(Sri Lanka) 2006	Did not qualify							
(Malaysia) 2008	Did not qualify							
(New Zealand) 2010	Did not qualify							
(Australia) 2012	Did not qualify							
(United Arab Emirates) 2014	Did not qualify							
(Bangladesh) 2016	Did not qualify							
(New Zealand) 2018	Did not qualify							
(South Africa) 2020	Did not qualify							
(Cricket West Indies) 2022	Withdrew							
Total				6	2	4	0	0

== Squads ==
=== 2019 squad ===
The current U-19 squad representing Denmark (as of July 2019) is: Abdullah Mahmood (C), Hadeed Adnan (WK), Aden Aftab, Bilal Aftab, Sami Ahmed, Lucky Ali, Azim Khan, Wahid Mahmood, Moeez Raza, Musa Shaheen, Imal Uriakhail, Sameer Zeb, Sami Zeb, and Shekeel Zeb.
