= 2005 ACC Under-19 Cup =

Cricket tournament

- Dates: 8 – 19 November 2005
- Administrator: Asian Cricket Council
- Cricket format: 50-over
- Tournament format(s): Group stage, playoffs
- Host: Nepal
- Champions: Nepal (3rd title)
- Participants: 15
- Matches: 28
- Most runs: (Malaysia) Ariffin Ramly (276)
- Most wickets: (Hong Kong) Irfan Ahmed (14)

The 2005 ACC Under-19 Cup was an international under-19 cricket tournament held in Nepal from 8 to 19 November 2005. The sixth ACC under-19 tournament to be held, matches were played in the capital Kathmandu and three other cities in the Kathmandu Valley, Bhaktapur, Kirtipur, and Lalitpur.

The number of teams at the tournament increased to fifteen (from the ten at the previous edition), with Afghanistan, Bahrain, Brunei, Iran, and Saudi Arabia making their debuts. Coached by Roy Dias and captained by Paras Khadka, Nepal defeated Malaysia in the final at Kirtipur's Tribhuvan University International Cricket Ground, with an estimated 10–15,000 people in attendance, as well as television viewership of 1.5 million. The team won its second consecutive title (and third overall), and consecutively qualified for the 2006 Under-19 World Cup in Sri Lanka. Kuwait and Qatar were the losing semi-finalists for the second tournament in a row. The leading runscorer at the tournament was Malaysian batsman Ariffin Ramly, while the leading wicket-taker was Hong Kong's Irfan Ahmed. The tournament's semi-finals and final were broadcast live on Nepal Television.

== Group stages ==
Full fixtures:CricketArchive

=== Group A ===
Team	Pld	W	L	BP	CP	Pts	NRR
Nepal	2	2	0	2	0	12	+5.120
Bahrain	2	1	1	1	0	6	+2.832
Brunei	2	0	2	0	0	0	−6.973

Notes

- Group A was the only group to have three teams; all others had four.
- Bahrain scored 383/4 from 50 overs against Brunei, the highest team total of the tournament.
- Brunei were dismissed for 21 from 15.2 overs against Nepal, the lowest team total of the tournament.
- Two centuries were scored in Group A, both by Bahraini batsman against Brunei, with Gayan de Silva scoring 200 not out and Danish Jasnaik scoring 102 not out. De Silva's innings was the best individual batting performance at the tournament.
- One five-wicket haul was recorded in Group B, with Bahrain's Salman Sattar taking 8/15 against Brunei, the best individual bowling performance at the tournament.

=== Group B ===
Team	Pld	W	L	BP	CP	Pts	NRR
Kuwait	3	3	0	2	0	17	+2.937
United Arab Emirates	3	2	1	2	1	13	+2.433
Afghanistan	3	1	2	1	0	6	+1.158
Iran	3	0	3	0	0	0	−6.053

Notes

- Two centuries were scored in Group B, both against Iran – Kuwait's Habibullah Iftikhar scored 153 and the UAE's Shehan Dharmasena scored 109.
- Four five-wicket hauls were recorded in Group B – Afghanistan's Sanaullah Mohib took 5/17 against Iran, the UAE's Shoaib Sarwar took 5/21 against Iran, Kuwait's Ali Shahzad also took 5/21 against Iran, and the UAE's Mohammad Fawad took 5/26 against Afghanistan.

=== Group C ===
Team	Pld	W	L	BP	CP	Pts	NRR
Qatar	3	2	1	2	1	13	+1.211
Singapore	3	2	1	1	0	11	−0.282
Thailand	3	1	2	0	1	6	−0.242
Oman	3	1	2	0	1	6	−0.680

Notes

- Two five-wicket hauls were recorded in Group C – Singapore's Jayanth Ganapathy took 5/38 against Qatar and Oman's Mushtaq Syed against Singapore.

=== Group D ===
Team	Pld	W	L	BP	CP	Pts	NRR
Malaysia	3	3	0	3	0	18	+3.607
Hong Kong	3	2	1	2	0	12	+0.467
Saudi Arabia	3	1	2	1	0	6	−0.807
Maldives	3	0	3	0	0	0	−3.267

Notes

- Three five-wicket hauls were recorded in Group D, all against the Maldives – Hong Kong's Irfan Ahmed took 6/15, Malaysia's Darvin Muralitharan took 5/5, and Saudi Arabia's Imran Nasir took 5/28.

== Finals ==
Quarter-finals
D1	Malaysia	176/9
B2	United Arab Emirates	164
A2	Bahrain	123
C1	Qatar	124/3
D2	Hong Kong	179/8
B1	Kuwait	183/8
A1	Nepal	223/9
C2	Singapore	123

Semi-finals
D1	Malaysia	218/6
C1	Qatar	158
B1	Kuwait	146
A1	Nepal	147/1

Final
D1	Malaysia	83
A1	Nepal	87/3

=== Quarter-finals ===
16 November
Scorecard

Malaysia; 176/9 (48 overs)	v	Kuwait; 164 (44.2 overs)

Malaysia won by 12 runs
Birendra Sainik Awasiya Mahavidyalaya Ground, Bhaktapur
Umpires: Jahangir Alam and Suhas Phadkar
Player of the match: Manrick Singh (Mal)

- UAE won the toss and elected to bowl.
- The match was reduced to 48 overs per side before the start of play.

16 November
Scorecard

Bahrain; 123 (34.4 overs)	v	Qatar; 124/3 (29.4 overs)

Qatar won by 7 wickets
Pulchowk Campus Ground, Lalitpur
Umpires: Ranmore Martinesz and Zameer Haider
Player of the match: Tamoor Sajjad (Qat)

- Bahrain won the toss and elected to bat.

16 November
Scorecard

Hong Kong; 179/8 (50 overs)	v	Kuwait; 183/8 (45.1 overs)

Kuwait won by 2 wickets
Tudikhel Ground, Kathmandu
Umpires: Jasbir Singh and Manzur Rahman
Player of the match: Habibullah Iftikhar (Kuw)

- Kuwait won the toss and elected to bowl.

16 November
Scorecard

Nepal; 223/9 (50 overs)	v	Singapore; 123 (44.4 overs)

Nepal won by 100 runs
Tribhuvan University Ground, Kirtipur
Umpires: Karunaratne Boteju and Riazuddin
Player of the match: Sharad Vesawkar (Nep)

- Nepal won the toss and elected to bat.

=== Semi-finals ===
17 November
Scorecard

Malaysia; 218/6 (50 overs)	v	Qatar; 158 (42.2 overs)

Malaysia won by 60 runs
Tudikhel Ground, Kathmandu
Umpires: Ranmore Martinesz and Buddhi Pradhan
Player of the match: Manrick Singh (Mal)

- Qatar won the toss and elected to bowl.

17 November
Scorecard

Kuwait; 146 (39.2 overs)	v	Nepal; 147/1 (37.5 overs)

Nepal won by 9 wickets
Tribhuvan University Ground, Kirtipur
Umpires: Jasbir Singh and Nadir Shah
Player of the match: Amrit Bhattarai and Kanishka Chaugai (both Nep)

- Nepal won the toss and elected to bowl.

=== Final ===
19 November
Scorecard

Malaysia; 83 (25.5 overs)	v	Nepal; 87/3 (25.5 overs)

Nepal won by 7 wickets
Tribhuvan University Ground, Kirtipur
Umpires: K. G. Lakshminarayan and Zameer Haider
Player of the match: Bantu Bataju (Nep)

- Nepal won the toss and elected to bowl.
- Nepal won the 2005 ACC Under-19 Cup and qualified for the 2006 Under-19 World Cup.

== Statistics ==
=== Most runs ===
The top five runscorers are included in this table, ranked by runs scored and then by batting average.

Player	Team	Runs	Inns	Avg	Highest	100s	50s
Ariffin Ramly	Malaysia	276	6	69.00	98*	0	3
Habibullah Iftikhar	Kuwait	275	5	91.66	153*	1	1
Gayan de Silva	Bahrain	229	3	114.50	200*	1	0
Eszrafiq Azis	Malaysia	179	6	29.83	85	0	1
Suhan Alagaratnam	Malaysia	163	6	27.16	55	0	2

Source: CricketArchive

=== Most wickets ===
The top five wicket takers are listed in this table, ranked by wickets taken and then by bowling average.

Player	Team	Overs	Wkts	Ave	SR	Econ	BBI
Irfan Ahmed	Hong Kong	33.0	14	8.14	14.14	3.45	6/15
Amrit Bhattarai	Nepal	42.0	13	9.23	19.38	2.85	4/38
Tamoor Sajjad	Qatar	34.4	12	6.41	17.33	2.22	4/6
Imran Nasir	Saudi Arabia	28.0	12	7.33	14.00	3.14	5/28
Mohammad Fawad	United Arab Emirates	33.0	12	8.16	16.50	2.96	5/14

Source: CricketArchive

== Final standing ==
Rank	Team	Status
1	Nepal	Qualified for 2006 Under-19 World Cup
2	Malaysia	
3	Kuwait	
4	Qatar	
5	United Arab Emirates	
6	Hong Kong	
7	Singapore	
8	Bahrain	
9	Afghanistan	
10	Thailand	
11	Oman	
12	Saudi Arabia	
13	Maldives	
14	Iran	
15	Brunei	
