= List of international schools in Sri Lanka =

This is a list of notable international schools in Sri Lanka.

Institute	City	Province
École Internationale School	Kandy	Central Province
Colombo International School	Colombo; Kandy	Western Province; Central Province
Crescent Schools International	Colombo; Ratnapura	Western Province; Sabaragamuwa Province
Elizabeth Moir School	Colombo	Western Province
Gateway College, Sri Lanka	Colombo; Negombo; Kandy; Dehiwala; Ratmalana	Western Province; Central Province
Lyceum International School	Nugegoda; Wattala; Panadura; Ratnapura; Gampaha; Nuwara Eliya; Anuradhapura; Kurunegala; Avissawella; Katunayake	Western Province; Western Province; Western Province; Sabaragamuwa Province; Western Province; Central Province; North Central Province; North Western Province; Western Province; Western Province
Overseas School of Colombo	Colombo	Western Province
Royal Institute International School	Colombo; Nugegoda; Maharagama; Gampaha	Western Province; Western Province; Western Province; Western Province; Western Province
