= 2003 Youth Asia Cup =

Cricket tournament

- Dates: 14 – 27 July 2003
- Administrator(s): Asian Cricket Council; Pakistan Cricket Board
- Cricket format: 50-over
- Tournament format(s): Group stage, playoffs
- Host: Pakistan
- Champions: Nepal (2nd title)
- Participants: 10
- Matches: 23
- Player of the series: (Oman) Adnan Ilyas
- Most runs: (Oman) Adnan Ilyas (239)
- Most wickets: (Nepal) Manjeet Shrestha (10) (Oman) Adnan Ilyas (10) (Kuwait) Waqas Jamil (10)

The 2003 Youth Asia Cup was an international under-19 cricket tournament held in Karachi, Pakistan, from 14 to 27 July 2003. The fifth ACC under-19 tournament to be held, it was originally scheduled to be held in Singapore, but was moved to Karachi as a precaution against the SARS outbreak. The Asian Cricket Council (ACC) and Pakistan Cricket Board (PCB) shared organising responsibilities.

Nepal defeated Malaysia in the final, winning its second title and qualifying for the 2004 Under-19 World Cup in Bangladesh. Played during the usual off-season in Pakistan, the tournament was heavily impacted by monsoon rains – three matches (including the final) were shortened, three ended in no result (including a semi-final), and five were abandoned entirely (including the other semi-final), with no play possible. The player of the tournament was Oman's Adnan Ilyas, who was the leading runscorer, and also one of three players who led the tournament's wicket-taking, alongside Nepal's Manjeet Shrestha and Kuwait's Waqas Jamil.

== Squads ==
Hong Kong	Kuwait	Malaysia	Maldives	Nepal
Kieran Kumaria (c); Zain Abbas; Irfan Ahmed; Nadeem Ahmed; Skhawat Ali; Moazzam Ayub; Colin Bridges; Courtney Kruger; Nicholas Lau; Matthew Lind (wk); Ansir Mahmood; Yogesh Mahtani; Ghulam Mustafa; Zaran Vachha	Adeel Mirza (c); Abdullah Iftikhar; Abdur Rahman; Ahmed Ebrahim Mohammad; Ali Shahzad; Ali Talib; Arnav Dutta; Emad Al-Jassam; Faisal Mohammad; Habibullah Iftikhar; Hamza Arif (wk); Khalid Al-Mutawa; Othman Abdul Aziz; Saim Shibli; Sajid Ashraf; Waqas Jamil; Yasar Idrees; Zeeshan Ahmed	Eszrafiq Azis (c); Anwar Arudin; Saiful Hawari; Suhan Kumar; Joshua Mahadevan; Stephen Maxwell; Ariffin Ramly; Mohammad Razman; Shanmugam Sathiswaran; Mohammad Shukri; Manrick Singh; Sambo Tamilarasan; Satgunasingam Vickneswaran; Rosman Zakaria (wk)	Mohamed Mahfooz (c); Ahmed Hassan; Ahmed Ismail; Hassan Aflam; Hassan Ibrahim (wk); Hassan Miras; Hussain Adnan; Hussain Izwan; Hussain Riman; Hussain Rishwan; Mohamed Habeeb; Mohamed Idhaam; Mohamed Imran; Mohamed Sais; Mohamed Shubiab; Mohamed Sobir; Mohamed Waseem; Umar Jamal	Shakti Gauchan (c); Pramod Basnet; Prem Chaudhary; Kanishka Chaugai; Manoj Katuwal (wk); Paras Khadka; Deepesh Khatri; Ratan Kumar; Lakpa Lama; Manjeet Shrestha; Raj Shrestha; Irfan Siddique; Yashwant Subedi; Sharad Veswakar
Oman	Qatar	Singapore	Thailand	United Arab Emirates
Rafeeq Al Balushi (c); Rostam Ali Khan; Ansar Ansari; Hussain Bilal; Asad Haider; Mehndi Hassan; Adnan Ilyas; Abbas Jawad; Nitish Kandwal; Pranav Mehta (wk); Derrick Ruston; Vignesh Shenoy; Yash Thakkar; Imran Younus	Athar Khan (c); Abdul Aziz; Asif Mohammad; Fahad Dalvi; Faisal Noor; Khalid Azeem; Hassan Ahmed; Mohammad Emran; Mosin Shabbir; Omar Arshad; Omar Sharif; Qamar Sadiq; Saifur Rehman; Sarmad Adil; Walimuni Migara; Wasim Akram; Yaseen Badsha; Zaheeruddin Ibrahim (wk)	Zeeshan Raza (c); Shafees Altaf; Aziz-ul-Ariffin; Senthil Dayalan (wk); Iftekhar Haider; Christopher Janik; Ronald Joseph; Rizwan Madakia; Glenn Meyer; James Muruthi; Peter Muruthi; Shaun Sabapathy; Utkarah Sharma; Maxim Yuen	Saurabh Dhanukha (c); Danushka Abeyasekara; Saad Akbar; Neeraj Annachhatra; Kwan Chand (wk); Chirag Chugani; Akshay Desai; Theerapnat Kanijou; Swapnil Kaushik; Arujun Kumar; Adrash Mukerjee; Sunil Nalinvilawan; Sahan Ranamukharaachchi; Nishadh Rego; Deepak Saraff; Darshil Shah	Ryan Chadha (c); Abdul Rehman; Ali Abdulla; Asim Zubair; Farhan Siddiqui; Leon Carlo; Owais Hameed; Pranov Arora; Qasim Zubair; Ramveer Rai; Riaz Khaliq; Rizwan Azhar; Shoaib Sarwar; Umar Shah

== Group stages ==
Source: CricketArchive

=== Group A ===
Team	Pld	W	L	NR	A	BP	Pts	NRR
Nepal	4	3	0	0	1	3	21	+4.608
Qatar	4	1	1	1	1	1	12	+1.204
United Arab Emirates	4	1	1	1	1	1	12	–0.204
Singapore	4	1	1	1	1	0	11	–1.030
Maldives	4	0	3	1	0	0	3	–5.209

14 July
Scorecard

Nepal; 391/4 (50 overs)	v	Maldives; 47 (31.3 overs)

Nepal won by 344 runs
National Stadium, Karachi
Umpires: Aleem Dar and Nadeem Ghauri

- Nepal won the toss and elected to bat.

14 July
Scorecard

Singapore; 249/9 (50 overs)	v	Qatar; 209/9 (50 overs)

Singapore won by 40 runs
Karachi Gymkhana
Umpires: Mohammad Aslam and Saleem Badar

- Singapore won the toss and elected to bat.

16 July
Scorecard

Singapore; 276/9 (50 overs)	v	Maldives; 17/1 (6.4 overs)

No result
Karachi Gymkhana
Umpires: Aleem Dar and Mohammad Aslam

- Singapore won the toss and elected to bat.

16 July
Scorecard

United Arab Emirates; 201 (43 overs)	v	Qatar; 13/0 (2.4 overs)

No result
United Bank Sports Complex, Karachi
Umpires: Islam Khan and Nadeem Ghauri

- UAE won the toss and elected to bat.

18 July
Scorecard

Nepal	v	Qatar

Match abandoned
Asghar Ali Shah Stadium, Karachi
Umpires: Afzaal Ahmed and Nadeem Ghauri

- No toss was made.

18 July
Scorecard

Singapore	v	United Arab Emirates

Match abandoned
National Stadium, Karachi
Umpires: Islam Khan and Mohammad Aslam

- No toss was made.

20 July
Scorecard

Maldives; 50 (23.4 overs)	v	Qatar; 51/2 (12 overs)

Qatar won by 8 wickets
PCB Academy Ground, Karachi
Umpires: Mohammad Aslam and Saleem Badar

- Qatar won the toss and elected to bowl.

20 July
Scorecard

United Arab Emirates; 78 (39.5 overs)	v	Nepal; 79/2 (15.1 overs)

Nepal won by 8 wickets
National Stadium, Karachi
Umpires: Asad Rauf and Islam Khan

- UAE won the toss and elected to bat.

22 July
Scorecard

Maldives; 94 (35.4 overs)	v	United Arab Emirates; 96/2 (21 overs)

UAE won by 8 wickets
PCB Academy Ground, Karachi
Umpires: Afzaal Ahmed and Nadeem Ghauri

- UAE won the toss and elected to bowl.

22 July
Scorecard

Nepal; 202/8 (50 overs)	v	Singapore; 59 (45.1 overs)

Nepal won by 143 runs
Asghar Ali Shah Stadium, Karachi
Umpires: Islam Khan and Saleem Badar

- Nepal won the toss and elected to bat.

=== Group B ===
Team	Pld	W	L	NR	A	BP	Pts	NRR
Malaysia	4	3	0	0	1	2	20	+2.337
Kuwait	4	2	1	0	1	2	15	+1.867
Oman	4	1	2	0	0	2	12	+1.670
Hong Kong	4	1	2	0	1	1	9	–2.064
Thailand	4	0	3	0	1	0	3	–3.935

15 July
Scorecard

Oman; 296/5 (50 overs)	v	Hong Kong; 71 (24 overs)

Oman won by 225 runs
National Stadium, Karachi
Umpires: Afzaal Ahmed and Nadeem Ghauri

- Oman won the toss and elected to bowl.

15 July
Scorecard

Kuwait; 279 (49.4 overs)	v	Malaysia; 283/2 (45.4 overs)

Malaysia won by 8 wickets
Quaid-e-Azam Stadium, Karachi
Umpires: Asad Rauf and Islam Khan

17 July
Scorecard

Hong Kong	v	Malaysia

Match abandoned
PCB Academy Ground, Karachi
Umpires: Afzaal Ahmed and Saleem Badar

17 July
Scorecard

Kuwait	v	Thailand

Match abandoned
Aga Khan Gymkhana Ground, Karachi
Umpires: Aleem Dar and Asad Rauf

19 July
Scorecard

Hong Kong; 129 (33 overs)	v	Kuwait; 133/3 (24.3 overs)

Kuwait won by 7 wickets
Quaid-e-Azam Stadium, Karachi
Umpires: Aleem Dar and Mohammad Aslam

- Kuwait won the toss and elected to bowl.
- The match was reduced to 35 overs per side before the start of play.

19 July
Scorecard

Thailand; 52 (23 overs)	v	Oman; 55/0 (3.1 overs)

Oman won by 10 wickets
National Stadium, Karachi
Umpires: Asad Rauf and Saleem Badar

- Thailand won the toss and elected to bat.

21 July
Scorecard

Thailand; 174 (46.2 overs)	v	Hong Kong; 178/6 (36 overs)

Hong Kong won by 4 wickets
National Stadium, Karachi
Umpires: Asad Rauf and Nadeem Ghauri

- Thailand won the toss and elected to bat.

21 July
Scorecard

Malaysia; 278/5 (50 overs)	v	Oman; 157/9 (30 overs)

Malaysia won by 51 runs (D/L)
Quaid-e-Azam Stadium, Karachi
Umpires: Aleem Dar and Islam Khan

- Oman won the toss and elected to bowl.
- Oman's target was 209 runs in 30 overs.

23 July
Scorecard

Oman; 85 (35.3 overs)	v	Kuwait; 86/6 (19.5 overs)

Kuwait won by 4 wickets
Quaid-e-Azam Stadium, Karachi
Umpires: Asad Rauf and Saleem Badar

- Kuwait won the toss and elected to bowl.

23 July
Scorecard

Thailand; 108 (48.5 overs)	v	Malaysia; 109/2 (16.2 overs)

Malaysia won by 8 wickets
National Stadium, Karachi
Umpires: Aleem Dar and Mohammad Aslam

- Thailand won the toss and elected to bat.

== Finals ==
=== Semi-finals ===
25–26 July
Scorecard

Nepal; 110/5 (33 overs)	v	Kuwait

No result
National Stadium, Karachi
Umpires: Islam Khan and Mohammad Aslam

- Nepal won the toss and elected to bat.
- The match was scheduled for one day but extended to two.
- Nepal qualified for the final based on a better record in the group stages.

25–26 July
Scorecard

Malaysia	v	Qatar

Match abandoned
Quaid-e-Azam Stadium, Karachi
Umpires: Asad Rauf and Saleem Badar

- No toss was made.
- The match was scheduled for one day but extended to two.
- Malaysia qualified for the final based on a better record in the group stages.

=== Final ===
27 July
Scorecard

Nepal; 155/5 (25 overs)	v	Malaysia; 125/6 (25 overs)

Nepal won by 30 runs
National Stadium, Karachi
Umpires: Aleem Dar and Nadeem Ghauri
Player of the match: Sharad Vesawkar (Nep)

- Malaysia won the toss and elected to bowl.
- The match was reduced to 25 overs per side before the start of play.
- Nepal won the 2003 Youth Asia Cup and qualified for the 2004 Under-19 World Cup.

== Statistics ==
=== Most runs ===
The top five runscorers are included in this table, ranked by runs scored and then by batting average.

Player	Team	Runs	Inns	Avg	Highest	100s	50s
Adnan Ilyas	Oman	239	4	119.50	168*	1	0
Kanishka Chaugai	Nepal	196	5	49.00	125	1	0
Satgunasingam Vickneswaran	Malaysia	183	3	61.00	125	1	0
Yashwant Subedi	Nepal	181	5	36.20	63	0	1
Saim Shibli	Kuwait	155	3	51.66	82	0	1

Source: CricketArchive

=== Most wickets ===
The top five wicket takers are listed in this table, ranked by wickets taken and then by bowling average.

Player	Team	Overs	Wkts	Ave	SR	Econ	BBI
Manjeet Shrestha	Nepal	24.0	10	6.50	14.40	2.70	4/17
Adnan Ilyas	Oman	28.0	10	9.70	16.80	3.46	6/16
Waqas Jamil	Kuwait	27.3	10	10.90	16.50	3.96	4/23
Imran Younus	Oman	23.0	8	9.37	17.25	3.26	3/17
Lakpar Lama	Nepal	28.5	7	5.85	24.71	1.42	3/5

Source: CricketArchive

== Final standing ==
Rank	Team	Status
1	Nepal	Qualified for 2004 Under-19 World Cup
2	Malaysia	
3	Kuwait	
4	Qatar	
5	Oman	
6	United Arab Emirates	
7	Singapore	
8	Hong Kong	
9	Thailand	
10	Maldives	
