= Wellawatta South Grama Niladhari Division =

Wellawatta South
- Grama Niladhari Division
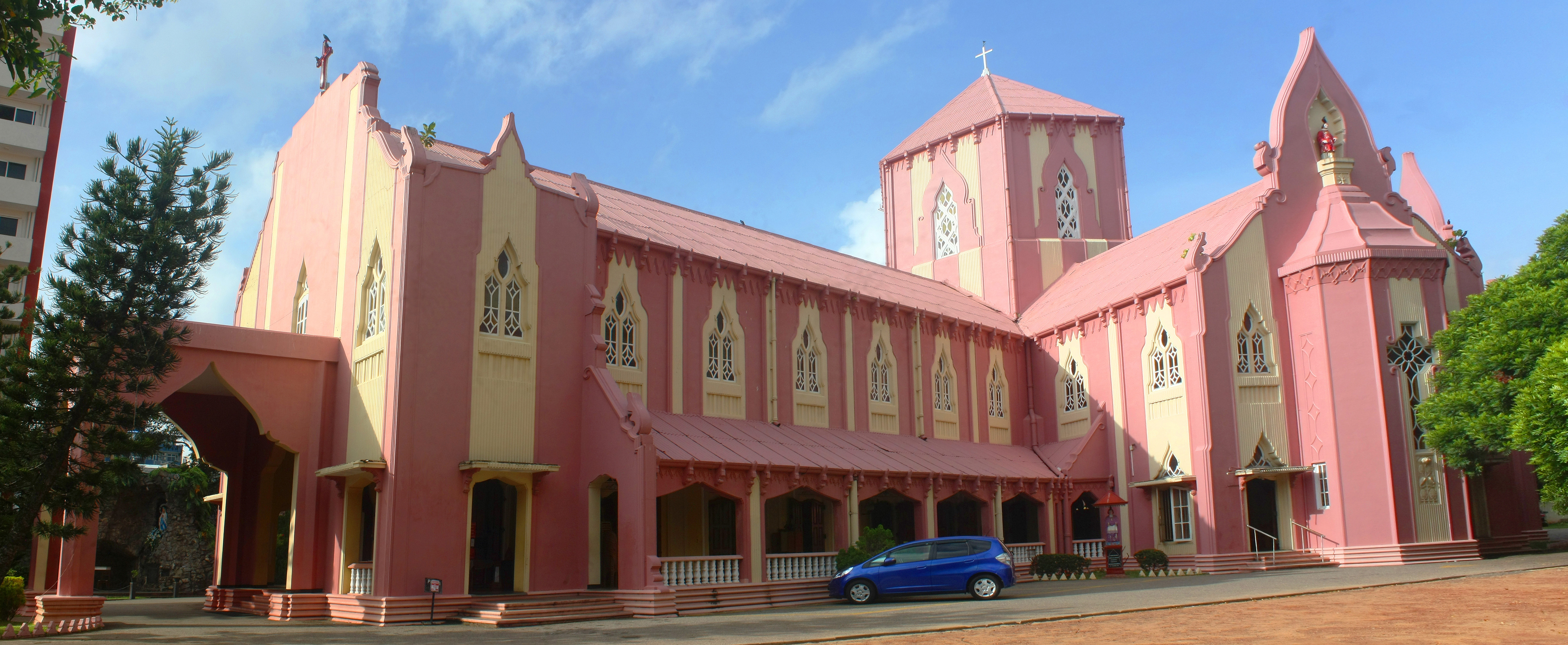
- St. Lawrence's Church, Wellawatte is located within, nearby or associated with the Wellawatta South Grama Niladhari Division
- Interactive map of Wellawatta South
- Coordinates: 6.866890°N 79.861484°E
- Country: Sri Lanka
- Province: Western Province
- District: Colombo District
- Divisional Secretariat: Thimbirigasyaya Divisional Secretariat
- Electoral District: Colombo Electoral District
- Polling Division: Colombo West Polling Division

Area
  - Total: 0.78 km^{2} (0.30 sq mi)
- Elevation: 18 m (59 ft)

Population (2012)
  - Total: 10,826
  - Density: 13,879/km^{2} (35,950/sq mi)
- ISO 3166 code: LK-1127090

Wellawatta South

Wellawatta South Grama Niladhari Division is a Grama Niladhari Division of the Thimbirigasyaya Divisional Secretariat of Colombo District of Western Province, Sri Lanka.

St. Lawrence's Church, Wellawatte, Mount-Lavinia and Wellawatte are located within, nearby or associated with Wellawatta South.

Wellawatta South is a surrounded by the Dehiwala West, Galwala, Sri Saranankara, Pamankada West and Wellawatta North Grama Niladhari Divisions.

== Demographics ==
=== Ethnicity ===
The Wellawatta South Grama Niladhari Division has a Sri Lankan Tamil majority (57.3%), a significant Sinhalese population (26.1%) and a significant Moor population (13.8%). In comparison, the Thimbirigasyaya Divisional Secretariat (which contains the Wellawatta South Grama Niladhari Division) has a Sinhalese majority (52.8%), a significant Sri Lankan Tamil population (28.0%) and a significant Moor population (15.1%)

Ethnicity in Wellawatta South
1. Sri Lankan Tamil (57.3%)
2. Sinhalese (26.1%)
3. Moor (13.8%)
4. Indian Tamil (1.90%)
5. Other (0.90%)

=== Religion ===
The Wellawatta South Grama Niladhari Division has a Hindu majority (53.2%), a significant Buddhist population (20.4%) and a significant Muslim population (15.6%). In comparison, the Thimbirigasyaya Divisional Secretariat (which contains the Wellawatta South Grama Niladhari Division) has a Buddhist plurality (47.9%), a significant Hindu population (22.5%) and a significant Muslim population (17.4%)

Religion in Wellawatta South
1. Hindu (53.2%)
2. Buddhist (20.4%)
3. Muslim (15.6%)
4. Roman Catholic (6.50%)
5. Other Christian (4.10%)
6. Other (0.20%)

== Gallery ==
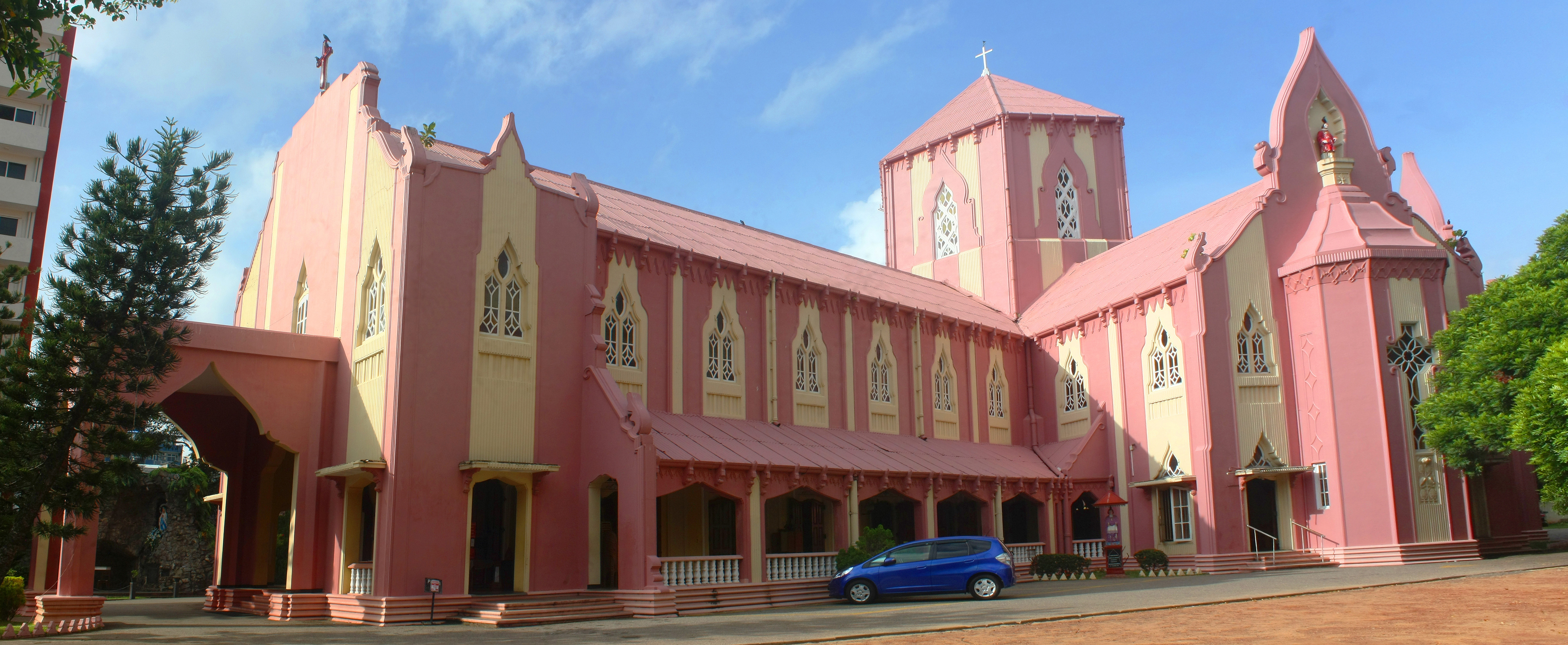
St. Lawrence's Church, Wellawatte

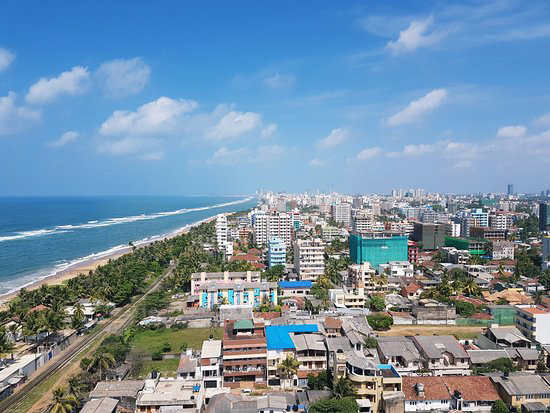
Mount-Lavinia
