= Private school (Sri Lanka) =

Type of educational institution in Sri Lanka

Private schools in Sri Lanka are an alternative to the public school system (government schools). These schools are privately funded, primarily through tuition fees, donations, or endowments, and they may offer either local or international curricula. Some private schools follow Sri Lanka's national education standards, while others offer internationally recognized qualifications.

Private schools in Sri Lanka generally adopt a local curriculum or an international curriculum, with some private schools (as opposed to fully privately owned) being partially owned by the government, the latter being semi-government schools.

== Private schools with local curriculum ==
Private schools in Sri Lanka that follow the local curriculum are referred to as "private schools." These institutions generally provide education in Sinhala, Tamil, and English. Some private schools with local curriculums may offer education solely in English.

Examples of well-known private schools offering local curriculums include S. Thomas' College, St.John's College, Jaffna, Jaffna College and Trinity College, Kandy. Notable girls' schools with local curriculums include Ladies' College, Colombo, Bishop's College, Colombo, Musaeus College and Hillwood College, Kandy.

Unlike international schools, local private schools do not offer international qualifications like the International Baccalaureate (IB) or Cambridge International Examinations (CIE) but are still an option for families seeking traditional education for their children.

== Private schools with international curriculum ==
Private schools in Sri Lanka offering international curriculums are known as "international schools." These schools provide education based on internationally recognized curricula such as the International Baccalaureate (IB) or Cambridge International Examinations (CIE).

Prominent international schools in Sri Lanka include Colombo International School, Gateway College, Elizabeth Moir School, and Lyceum International School. These schools aim to prepare students for international higher education and, much akin to international schools across the world, feature a diverse student body. The curricula cover a wide range of subjects, including foreign languages, arts, and humanities.

== Semi-government schools ==
Semi-government schools in Sri Lanka are partially funded by the government and partially by private industries. These schools are more autonomous compared to government schools, allowing for independent decision-making and management.
