= Mohamed Hussain Shareef =

Chief Government Spokesperson of the Maldives since 2026

- މުޙައްމަދު ޙުސައިން ޝަރީފް
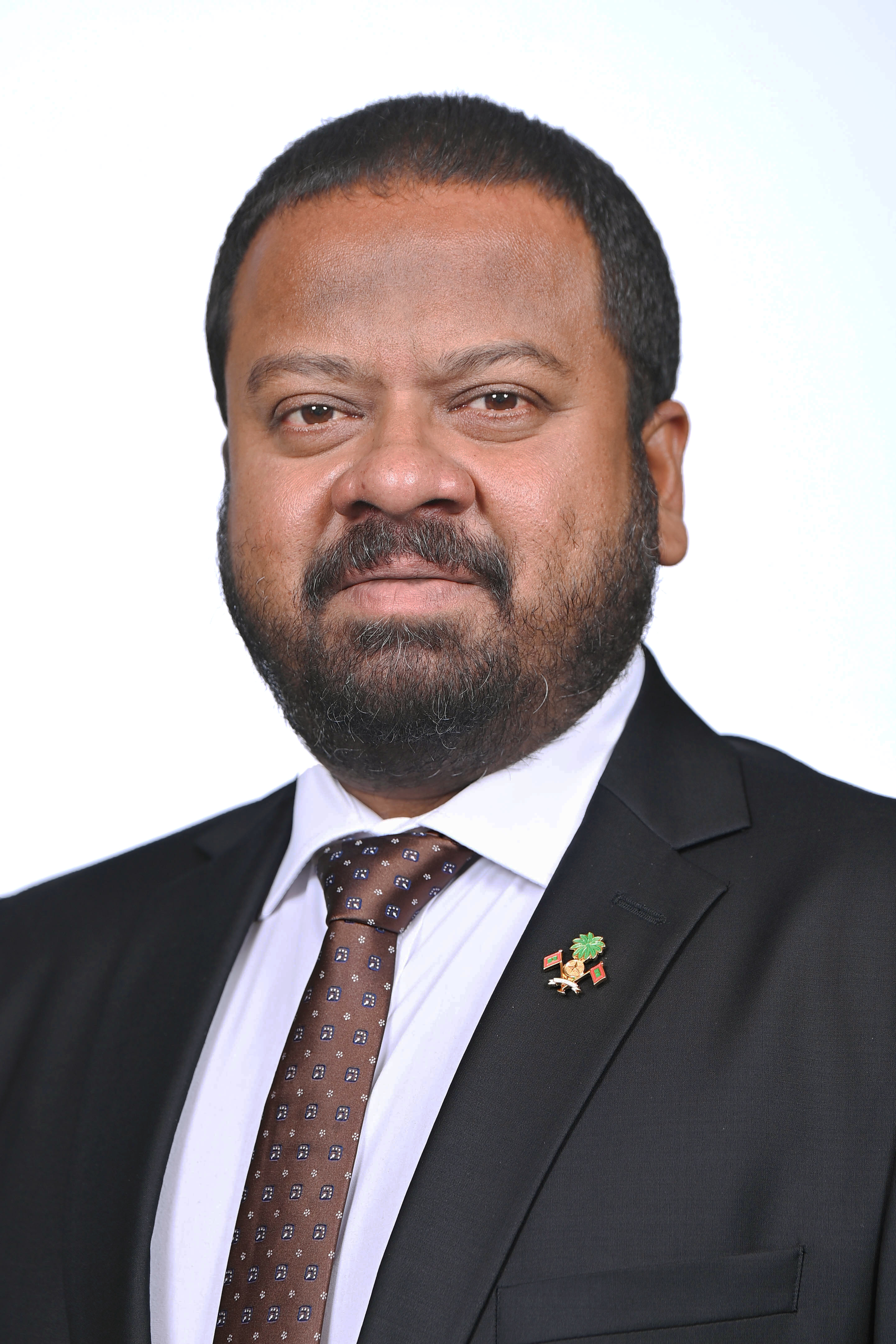
- Official portrait, 2026

Chief Government Spokesperson
- Incumbent
- Assumed office 15 April 2026
- President: Mohamed Muizzu
- Preceded by: Heena Waleed

Ambassador of the Maldives to the United Arab Emirates
- In office 14 June 2024 – 15 April 2026
- Appointed by: Mohamed Muizzu
- Preceded by: Aminath Shabeena

Ambassador of the Maldives to Sri Lanka
- In office 23 October 2017 – 16 November 2018
- Appointed by: Abdulla Yameen
- Succeeded by: Omar Abdul Razzaq

Ambassador of the Maldives to Japan
- In office 14 April 2017 – 2017
- Appointed by: Abdulla Yameen
- Succeeded by: Ibrahim Uvais

Minister of Human Resources, Youth and Sports
- In office 12 February 2012 – 17 November 2013
- Preceded by: Hassan Latheef
- President: Mohamed Waheed Hassan
- Succeeded by: Mohamed Maleeh Jamal

Personal details
- Born: 24 September 1977 (age 48) Malé, Maldives
- Party: Congress
- Other political affiliations: Progressive; Rayyithunge
- Parents: Hussain Rasheed (father); Asma Rasheed (mother)
- Education: Majeediyya School; Colombo International School; British School in Colombo
- Alma mater: University of Warwick (B.A., MPhil); Keele University (M.A.)

Mohamed Hussain Shareef (Dhivehi: މުޙައްމަދު ޙުސައިން ޝަރީފް; born 24 September 1977), commonly known as Mundhu, is a Maldivian politician and diplomat who is currently serving as the Chief Government Spokesperson of the Maldives since 2026. He previously served as the Minister of Human Resources, Youth and Sports from 2012 to 2013 and as the Ambassador of the Maldives to Japan from 2016 to 2017. He further served as the Ambassador of the Maldives to Sri Lanka, and served as the Ambassador of the Maldives to the United Arab Emirates from 2024 to 2026.

Hussain is also the 4th vice president of the People's National Congress since 2023.

== Early life ==
Mohamed Hussain Shareef was born on 24 September 1977, in Malé, Maldives. He is the son of Hussain Shareef (1948–2019), who served in the Maldivian government for nearly 30 years in the telecommunications sector. His mother, Asma Rasheed, has been a Member of Parliament since 2024, having also served from 2014 to 2019. Shareef was raised in a household with two other former parliamentarians: his uncle, Aslam Rasheed, and his aunt, Salma Rasheed.

=== Education ===
Shareef completed his primary and secondary education in the Maldives at Majeediyya School and in Sri Lanka at the Colombo International School (CIS) and the British School in Colombo (BSC). During his school years, he demonstrated strong linguistic and oratory skills, along with notable talents in sports, the arts, and leadership.

He pursued higher education in the United Kingdom, earning a Bachelor of Arts (Hons.) degree in Economics and Politics from the University of Warwick. Following his undergraduate studies, Mohamed immediately undertook a Master of Arts degree in Environmental Politics at Keele University.

After serving as Assistant Director and Head of the Environment Unit at the President's Office in the Maldives, Shareef returned to the University of Warwick for postgraduate research. In 2005, he completed an MPhil in Diplomacy and International Relations. His thesis was a comparative analysis of the negotiating positions of the Maldives and Malta at the United Nations Framework Convention on Climate Change (UNFCCC) Conference of the Parties.

== Career ==
=== Environmental career ===
Shareef began his career at the President's Office in 1999 as Assistant Director, heading the Environment Unit. In this role, he supported President Maumoon Abdul Gayoom's international efforts to raise awareness about climate change and the threat of sea level rise to the Maldives and other small island developing states (SIDS).

=== Public affairs ===
The 2004 Indian Ocean tsunami had a devastating impact on the Maldives, drawing Shareef into a public-facing role as a government spokesperson. His frequent appearances on international news networks resulted in his appointment as Deputy Chief Government Spokesman, and later, Chief Government Spokesman. Shareef played a significant role in enhancing government communication by establishing the Strategic Communications Unit (SCU) at the President's Office, where he served as Presidential Spokesperson and Executive Director. He was also responsible for overseeing the Presidential Protocol Section.

Following the 2008 presidential election defeat, Mohamed transitioned to the Secretariat of Former President Maumoon Abdul Gayoom, serving as his Special Assistant on Foreign Relations.

=== Minister of Human Resources, Youth and Sports ===
When President Mohamed Nasheed resigned in 2012, Mohamed Waheed Hassan assumed office. As a council member of the Progressive Party of Maldives (PPM), the largest party in Waheed's coalition, Shareef was appointed Minister of Human Resources, Youth, and Sports. At 34, he became the youngest person to hold this position in the Maldives.

During his tenure, Shareef focused on establishing state-run youth centres across all atolls and promoting youth employment and training. Under his leadership, the Maldives experienced significant success in sports, particularly in football and volleyball. He authored the Progressive Party of Maldives's Youth Manifesto and Sports Manifesto in 2013.

=== Political career ===
Shareef's political involvement began in 2005 when he joined the Dhivehi Rayyithunge Party (DRP). He left the DRP in 2010 to join Gayoom in founding the PPM, where he served as the first Secretary General and Spokesman. He was later elected to the PPM's Interim and Governing Councils. Mohamed contributed to the party's electoral successes, including victories in multiple by-elections for parliamentary and local council seats. He played a key strategic role in the PPM's 2013 presidential election campaign and represented the party on the Elections Commission Advisory Committee during the election.

In 2013, Shareef was appointed Minister at the President's Office. During his tenure as Minister at the president's office, Shareef led the Maldives' delegations to the International Labour Organization (ILO) Ministerial Conference in 2012, the Commonwealth Sports Ministers Meeting in London, and the Commonwealth Youth Ministers Meeting in Papua New Guinea. He also represented the Maldives at the Organisation of Islamic Cooperation's Council of Foreign Ministers in Guinea in 2013 and attended the State Funeral of Nelson Mandela as a special envoy of the president.

In 2026, Shareef was appointed as the Chief Government Spokesperson by President Mohamed Muizzu. On 16 September, he was reelected as one of the vice presidents of the People's National Congress.

=== Diplomatic career ===
Throughout his career, Shareef was involved in foreign affairs, often serving as a speechwriter and delegate for President Gayoom at major international events. He attended numerous United Nations General Assembly sessions, Non-Aligned Movement Summits, Commonwealth Heads of Government Meetings, and SAARC summits. In 2006, he became the first Maldivian to interpret a speech at the UN General Assembly when President Gayoom addressed the gathering in Dhivehi.

On 19 December 2016, Shareef was appointed Ambassador of the Maldives to Japan by President Abdulla Yameen. He arrived in Japan the following year and presented his Letter of Credentials at the Imperial Palace on 14 April 2017. On 21 August of the same year, he was nominated by President Abdulla Yameen as the next Ambassador of Sri Lanka. He later presented his letter of credence to Sri Lankan president Maithripala Sirisena on 23 October 2017. In 2018, he resigned as the ambassador. In 2023, Shareef was appointed Ambassador of the Maldives to the United Arab Emirates; he presented his credentials to Mohamed bin Zayed Al Nahyan in June 2024. He later resigned as the Ambassador of the Maldives to the United Arab Emirates in 2026 after being appointed the Chief Government Spokesperson.
