= Amal International School =

Location
- Wellawatta; Colombo; Sri Lanka; 06°53′03″N 79°52′10″E

Information
- Type: Private
- Motto: Enter to Learn, Depart to Serve
- Established: 1991
- Founder: M.C.M Zarook
- Chairman: M.A.M. Hakeem
- Principal: Razeen Assan
- Gender: Boy
- Age range: 2-19
- Enrollment: 1300
- Language: English
- Colors: Green & gold
- Website: amaledu.lk

Amal International School (AIS) is an international school in Colombo, Sri Lanka. It was founded in 1991, as a social service project to develop and expand education in national curriculum with the medium of instruction in English. Amal International School is attended by students ranging from Preschool to Advanced Level.

== Location ==
The school is located in the Western Province of Sri Lanka. Amal international school is in Dharmarama road, Off Havelock Road, Colombo 00600.

== Studies and Annual Events ==
Amal International School currently follows the national curriculum, set by the Ministry of Education. The school is conducting extracurricular activities such as:

- The annual award ceremony
- Educational tours
- Basketball
- Sports day

== See also ==
- Education in Sri Lanka
- List of schools in Sri Lanka
- List of international schools in Sri Lanka
