= Owais Hameed =

International cricketer

Personal information
- Born: 22 November 1987 (age 38); Dubai, United Arab Emirates
- Batting: Right-handed
- Bowling: Right-arm off-spin

International information
- National side: United Arab Emirates (2007–2010)
- Source: CricketArchive, 6 April 2016

Owais Hameed (born 22 November 1987) is a former international cricketer who represented the United Arab Emirates national team between 2007 and 2010. He bowled right-arm off-spin and batted right-handed.

== Biography ==
Hameed was born in Dubai to a father originally from Pakistan. He represented the UAE under-19s at the 2003 Youth Asia Cup, aged only 15, and later also at the 2005 ACC Under-19 Cup and the 2007 ACC Under-19 Elite Cup. Hameed made his senior debut for the UAE at the 2007 ACC Twenty20 Cup in Kuwait. He featured in five of his team's six matches, and took three wickets, with a best of 2/11 from four overs against Saudi Arabia. Later in 2007, Hameed made two appearances for the UAE in the 2007 World Cricket League Division Two tournament, where matches held List A status. Early the following year, he was selected for an Intercontinental Cup game against Namibia, which held first-class status. At the 2009 World Cup Qualifier, Hameed was selected for nine of his team's ten matches. He was given little game time, batting only four times and bowling a total of 9.4 overs across three innings. His sole wicket came against Denmark, where he took 1/40 from 4.4 overs. Hameed made his last appearance for the UAE in March 2010.
