= Gayan de Silva (Bahraini cricketer) =

Personal information
- Full name: Kariyawasam Thantrige Gayan Thilanka de Silva
- Born: 23 February 1988 (age 38); Adliya, Bahrain
- Batting: Left-handed
- Bowling: Left-arm fast-medium

International information
- National side: Bahrain (2004–2006)

Domestic team information
- Years: Team
- 2013: Galle Cricket Club
- 2014: Colts Cricket Club
- 2014–2015: Chilaw Marians Cricket Club

Career statistics
Competition	FC	LA	T20
Matches	4	1	3
Runs scored	30	1	1
Batting average	7.50	1.00	1.00
100s/50s	0/0	0/0	0/0
Top score	14*	1	1
Balls bowled	252	36	36
Wickets	5	0	1
Bowling average	31.60	–	61.00
5 wickets in innings	0	–	0
10 wickets in match	0	–	0
Best bowling	4/51	–	1/36
Catches/stumpings	7/–	0/–	0/–
- Source: Cricinfo, 12 May 2015

Kariyawasam Thantrige Gayan Thilanka de Silva (born 23 February 1988), known as Gayan de Silva, is a professional cricketer who made his debut in Sri Lankan domestic cricket during the 2012–13 season. His early cricket was played in Bahrain, the country of his birth, and he played at senior level for the Bahraini national side between 2004 and 2006, having earlier represented Bahrain at various underage levels.

Born in Adliya, Manama, de Silva represented Bahrain at the 2000 Under-17 Asia Cup in Pakistan, despite being only 12 years old at the time. At his next major tournament, the 2004 ACC Under-17 Trophy, he captained Bahrain, and finished with 165 runs from five matches, the most of any Bahraini. His highest score was 72 from 68 balls against Thailand. Following his under-17s performance, de Silva was selected in the Bahraini senior squad for the 2004 ACC Trophy in Malaysia, still aged only 16. Although he did not take a wicket at the tournament, his two appearances, against Hong Kong and Oman, saw him become the youngest man to play senior cricket for Bahrain. In his only tournament for the Bahrain under-19s, the 2005 ACC Under-19 Cup in Nepal, de Silva set an ACC Under-19 Cup record, scoring 200 not out from 140 balls against Brunei. As of May 2015, his innings remains the only double century scored at an ACC under-19 tournament.

The last tournament de Silva played for a Bahraini side was the 2006 ACC Trophy in Malaysia. His school sport, which included both cricket and basketball, had been played for Colombo's Elizabeth Moir School. de Silva spent the 2012 English season playing club cricket as a professional for Lindum in the Lincolnshire Premier League. Signing with Galle Cricket Club for the 2012–13 Sri Lankan season, he made his first-class debut in February 2013, against Kurunegala Youth Cricket Club in the Premier Trophy. The following season, he appeared in two fixtures for Colts Cricket Club against touring international sides, Hong Kong and Nigeria, with the match against Hong Kong having full Twenty20 status. de Silva signed with Chilaw Marians for the 2014–15 season, and went on to make three Premier Trophy appearances and a single Premier Limited Overs appearance. In his first Premier Trophy appearance for Chilaw Marians, he took 4/51 in the first innings against Colombo CC, his best first-class figures to date. Unlike in Bahrain, where he was touted as a "genuine all-rounder" and often batted in the top order, in Sri Lanka de Silva has played almost exclusively as a bowler. He now is the head of sports at Elizabeth Moir School, Colombo where he coaches the football and cricket teams.
