= EAP Films =

EAP Films & Theatres
- Company type: Subsidiary
- Industry: Entertainment
- Founded: 1972; 54 years ago
- Founder: EAP Edirisinghe; Soma Edirisinghe
- Revenue: ▲ Rs 34.2 billion (2019)
- Owner: Ben Holdings (since 2019)
- Parent: EAP Holdings (1972-2019); Ben Holdings (Lycamobile) (2019-present)
- Subsidiaries: Savoy Cinema

EAP Films was originally founded as Edirisinghe Cinema Theatres in 1972. It has the largest share of the Sri Lanka theatre market with more than 15+ screens island-wide. It started producing films in 1994 and its first release was Dhawala Pushpaya (1994). The company has been listed on the Colombo Stock Exchange since the 2000s.

== History ==
The company was founded by a husband-and-wife team in 1972 as Edirisinghe Cinema Theatres under its parent company, EAP Group. EAP acquired Savoy Cinema theatres in 1974. At first only Sinhala films were distributed, but during the mid-1980s a license for distribution of Hollywood movies was added.

Its theatres converted to digital in 2014. A cinema was built in Wellawatte. EAP Film had their highest recorded bookings of 10,000 tickets for the 3D Tamil film 2.0. Sunil Ariyaratne's Vijayaba Kollaya, Gajaman was also screened in 3D.

In 2015 Village Roadshow of Australia and EAP Group signed a partnership. In 2019, Ben Holdings acquired EAP Films for 12 billion Rs.

In 2019, EAP Broadcasting Company parent company EAP Holdings was acquired by Lyca Group. EAP Broadcasting Company is a subsidiary of Ben Holdings along with Lyca Productions.

== Circuit ==
Apart from theatre, EAP Films & Theatres have their own circuit which is used to distribute film to theatres.

EAP Theatres
Film theatre	Location	Opened
Regal Cinema	Kompanna Veediya	1941
Savoy Cinema 1 3D	Wellawatte	1949
Samantha Cinema	Dematagoda	1949
Tower Cinema	Moratuwa	1952
Nikado Cinema	Kadawatha	1959
Jothi Cinema	Ratanapura	1964
Quinlon Cinema	Nugegoda	1976
Savoy Cinema (Roxy cinema)	Wellawatte	1982
Wilmax Cinema	Anuradhapura	1986
Queens Cinema	Galle	1991
Cinemax Cinema	Ja-Ela	1993
Regal Cinema	Ambalangoda	1998
Sinexpo Cinema	Kurunegala	2002
