= The Making of the English Working Class =

1963 history book by E. P. Thompson

- First paperback edition, featuring a detail from a 19th-century aquatint by R. D. Havell. In the background, John Blenkinsop's locomotive can be seen.
- Author: E. P. Thompson
- Language: English
- Subject: Labour history Social history
- Publisher: Victor Gollancz Ltd; Vintage Books
- Publication date: 1963, 1968 (rev. ed.), 1980 (new preface)
- Publication place: United Kingdom
- Media type: Print (hardcover & paperback)
- Pages: 848
- ISBN: 0-14-013603-7
- OCLC: 29894851

The Making of the English Working Class is a work of English social history written by E. P. Thompson, a New Left historian. It was first published in 1963 by Victor Gollancz Ltd, and republished in revised form in 1968 by Pelican, after which it became an early Open University set book. It concentrates on English artisan and working-class society "in its formative years 1780 to 1832".

It was placed 30th in the Modern Library 100 Best Nonfiction books of the 20th century.

== Overview ==
In the preface, Thompson said of his aims: "I am seeking to rescue the poor stockinger, the Luddite cropper, the 'obsolete' hand-loom weaver, the 'utopian' artisan, and even the deluded follower of Joanna Southcott, from the enormous condescension of posterity." Thompson uses a humanist approach to social history, being critical of those who turn the people of the working class into an inhuman statistical bloc. Thompson wished to disassociate Marxism from Stalinism, and added humanistic principles to the book as a way of steering the left towards democratic socialism, as opposed to totalitarianism.

Thompson expounds upon his theories on working-class consciousness, which he says are manifested by values of solidarity, collectivism, mutuality, political radicalism and Methodism. Thompson uses the term "working class", rather than "classes", throughout the book to emphasize the growth of a working-class consciousness. He claims in the Preface that "in the years between 1780 and 1832 most English working people came to feel an identity of interests as between themselves, and as against other men whose interests are different from (and usually opposed to) theirs". This change in consciousness is described in Thompson's 1975 book on the 1723 Waltham Black Act.

In the book, Thompson discusses popular movements of the past, such as Jacobin societies like the London Corresponding Society, and attempts to recreate the life experience of the working class. Thompson also re-evaluates the Luddite movement and the influence of the early Methodist movement on working-class aspirations. (Thompson's parents were Methodist missionaries.)

== Reception ==
Sidney Pollard called the book "without a doubt, a landmark in English historiography". Robert K. Webb called it "both very important and extremely exasperating". David Eastwood argued that it "transformed the study of labour, class and political radicalism in Britain and America and is incontestably the single most influential work of history of the post-war period".

Geoffrey Best called it a "valuable and exciting book" but noted Thompson's neglect of the "flag-saluting, foreigner-hating, peer-respecting side of the plebeian mind" and asked, "How large a portion of 'the working class' did those 'artisans' form from whom so much of his evidence necessarily comes, and of how many hundreds of thousands of lower-class folk do we remain so much more ignorant that we cannot speak as confidently about them?"

In April 2020, Jacobin magazine launched a podcast series, Casualties of History, focusing on the book and critical receptions of Thompson’s work, by theorists such as Asad Haider and Sheila Rowbotham. In December 2023, BBC Radio 3 issued five episodes of its series The Essay "reflecting on the legacy, ideas and personal inspiration of The Making of the English Working Class" to mark sixty years since its first publication.
