= Pankaj Khimji =

Omani businessman and cricket administrator

- Education: Ealing, Hammersmith & West London College
- Occupations: Businessman, Cricket Administrator
- Organization(s): Khimji Ramdas Group, Oman Cricket, International Cricket Council, Asian Cricket Council
- Known for: Chairman of Oman Cricket, ICC Associate Member Director, ACC Vice-President

Pankaj Khimji (born October 1961) is an Omani businessman and cricket administrator who serves as chairman of Oman Cricket and as a director of the Khimji Ramdas Group. He holds positions as an Associate Member Director of the International Cricket Council (ICC) and vice-president of the Asian Cricket Council (ACC). In 2022, he was appointed Foreign Trade Advisor to the Omani government by Royal Decree.

== Biography ==
Khimji completed his education at Ealing, Hammersmith & West London College and worked as a construction engineer in the United Kingdom before joining the family business.

Khimji serves as a director of the Khimji Ramdas Group, a company established in 1870 that operates in infrastructure, consumer products, and retail sectors.

He was appointed Foreign Trade Advisor to the Omani government by Royal Decree in January 2022 and holds positions with the Oman-India Joint Business Council and the Omani-British Friendship Association.

Khimji became chairman of Oman Cricket in February 2016, succeeding his father Kanak Khimji who had held the position.

During his chairmanship, Oman co-hosted the 2021 ICC Men's T20 World Cup.

In November 2021, Khimji was elected as an Associate Member Director of the ICC, replacing Mahinda Vallipuram. He was appointed to ICC committees in 2022.

Khimji was appointed vice-president of the Asian Cricket Council in January 2022.
