= Elizabeth Moir =

Sri Lankan educationalist

Elizabeth Moir Tenduf-La, MBE is a British educationist in Sri Lanka. She founded the Colombo International School, British School in Colombo, and Elizabeth Moir School.

== Education ==
Elizabeth Moir read mathematics at Oxford, where she captained the Oxford University Women's Tennis team which beat Cambridge University 16 to 1 in 1961. She stayed on at Oxford to complete the Diploma in Education.

== Career ==
Soon after, she joined the Diocesan Girls’ School in Hong Kong where she established the A Level Mathematics Department. After four years in Asia, Moir returned to England where she worked as an IBM systems analyst in the City of London.

In 1982, she came to Sri Lanka, with her husband, Kesang Tenduf-La, and three children, and set up the Colombo International School. Using the British curriculum and offering London O and A Level examinations, its main clientele was Sri Lankan parents who would otherwise have sent their children overseas to be educated.

In 1990, Moir was asked by President Premadasa to run a multimedia English language programme on television and radio to give the rural people an equal opportunity to learn the English language that their counterparts in the towns enjoyed. She invited Barbara Goldsmith, a former Head of BBC English, to work with her. Her team bought the English language programme Follow Me from the BBC and used this with introductions in Sinhala and Tamil on the state radio and television at prime time. They had 80 language centres across the country from Jaffna in the North to Matara in the South, and held written and spoken English examinations set by the University of Warwick.

She then moved on to set up the British School in Colombo in 1994.

Mrs Moir started the Elizabeth Moir School in 1996.

== Honors ==
In June 2014 Mrs Elizabeth Moir Tenduf-La was appointed a Member of the Order of the British Empire for her services to British Education and the teaching of English in Sri Lanka. This award was presented to her at Windsor Castle in July 2015 by Her Majesty the Queen.

== Notes ==
This article was copied from , under an Open Government License, compatible with CC3.0 BY
