= Savoy Cinema, Colombo =

Movie theatre in Colombo, Sri Lanka

- Interactive map of the Savoy Cinema, Colombo area

General information
- Status: Operating
- Location: Wellawatte, Colombo, Galle Road, Wellawatte, Sri Lanka
- Coordinates: 6°52′41.88″N 79°51′28.45″E
- Opened: August 1949; 76 years ago
- Owner: EAP Films and Theatres Private Limited

Website
- EAP Films

Savoy Cinema, Colombo also known as Savoy 3D Cinema and Savoy 2 is a prominent cinema in Sri Lanka located on Galle Road in Wellawatte, Colombo, just near the old Dutch canal. The building is owned and run by EAP Films and Theatres Private Limited. The theatre generally have premiere releases in four languages including English, Sinhala, Tamil and Hindi languages.

The cinema opened in August 1949 with the premiere of The Jolson Story. It was initially owned and operated by C. V. de Silva, who named it after the Savoy Theatre in London. The original building had a small bookshop in the foyer and a number of shops that faced Galle Road, including a clothes shop and the Savoy Emporium, which dealt in medicines and groceries.
