= Cricket in Oman =

- Country: Oman
- Governing body: Oman Cricket
- National team: Oman

Cricket was introduced to Oman during the time when it was a British protectorate. The sport is popular amongst Oman's South Asian expatriate population, and has more recently been taken up by native Omanis. The governing body of cricket in the country is Oman Cricket. The Oman Cricket chairman, Pankaj Khimji, served as the vice-president of the Asian Cricket Council for 2022-23

== History ==
The Oman national men's team debuted at the 2002 ACC Trophy, while the national women's team debuted in 2009, at a regional tournament.

In 2014, following strong regional performances and youth development recognition from the Asian Cricket Council (ACC), Oman was promoted from Affiliate to ICC Associate Member.

== Venues ==
A 2016 Cricinfo article noted that cricket in Oman "has mostly been played on grassless, utterly brown outfields, on concrete strips covered with artificial turf". At the time of the establishment of the Oman Cricket Board in 1979, there was only a single ground regularly used for cricket, which was maintained by the Petroleum Development Oman and thus known as the PDO Ground. Within a few a few years, however, several other grounds had been acquired, included one at Sultan Qaboos University and one maintained by Oman Air. Beginning in the 1980s, two venues mainly used for football – the Royal Oman Police Stadium and the Sultan Qaboos Sports Complex – hosted occasional exhibition matches, sometimes featuring international players.

In July 2008, Oman Cricket announced plans to construct an international-standard facility at Al Emarat, inland from the city Muscat. The cost of the project was initially estimated at 2 million Omani rials (US$5.2 million), with the land donated by the Ministry of Sports Affairs and the rest of the funding to be raised through corporate sponsorship. The venue, known as the Al Emarat Cricket Stadium, was inaugurated in October 2012, by Ashraful Haque, the chief executive of the Asian Cricket Council. It held its first match – a club game – two months later. Floodlights were installed at the venue in 2015, and there are plans for an indoor academy to be built, to complement the existing academy at the Sultan Qaboos Sports Complex.

Since its inauguration the Al Amerat Cricket Ground has developed into Oman's principal venue for international cricket. The complex has two turf grounds and has hosted international matches and major tournaments, including the 2021 ICC Men's T20 World Cup and the 2025 ICC Men's T20 World Cup East Asia-Pacific Qualifier. In 2025, Oman Cricket announced plans to construct three additional grounds at Al Amerat, with the first expected to be completed by the end of 2026.

== Demographics ==
The majority of cricket players in Oman are expatriates from other cricket-playing countries – Bangladesh, India, Pakistan, and Sri Lanka. In 2010, fewer than 100 of the 780 players in the senior national league were Omani nationals. This number had increased to 400 by 2016, although there was also an increase in the number of overall players. Teams competing in the Omani league system are subject to a quota, being required to field a set number of Omani nationals in their playing line-ups. At a national level, only a few native Omanis have broken through into the team. For instance, at the 2016 ICC World Twenty20, only one of Oman's players, Sufyan Mehmood, was an Omani national (although another Omani national, Yousuf Mahmood, was named as a standby player).

== See also ==
- Category:Omani cricketers
