= Sujit Sivasundaram =

Sri Lankan historian

Sujit Sivasundaram FBA
- Born: June 1976 (age 50); Colombo, Sri Lanka

Academic background
- Education: University of Cambridge

Academic work
- Institutions: Gonville and Caius College, Cambridge

Sujit Sivasundaram FBA is a British Sri Lankan historian and academic. He is currently professor of world history at Gonville and Caius College, University of Cambridge.

== Early life ==
Sivasundaram was born in Sri Lanka. He is the great grand son of Lawrie Muthu Krishna, editor of the Ceylonese newspaper and founder of The Polytechnic vocational school. He is the grandson of Mano Muthu Krishna-Candappa, journalist and advocate for women's advancement in Sri Lanka.

Sivasundaram was educated at S. Thomas' Preparatory School and the Colombo International School. After school he joined the University of Cambridge on a scholarship in 1994 to study engineering but later switched to history and graduated in 1997 with a BA degree. He also has MPhil (1998) and PhD (2001) degrees from Cambridge.

== Career ==
Sivasundaram joined Gonville and Caius College, Cambridge in 2001 as a research fellow before becoming a lecturer. He has been a visiting professor at the Ecole des Hautes Etudes en Sciences Sociales and a visiting senior research fellow at the Asia Research Institute of the National University of Singapore and the University of Sydney. He taught south Asian and imperial history at the London School of Economics between 2008 and 2010. Between 2015 and 2017 he was Sackler Caird Fellow at the National Maritime Museum, Greenwich. He was director of the Centre for South Asian Studies, Cambridge and director of graduate studies at the Faculty of History, Cambridge. He is currently a fellow and professor of world history at Gonville and Caius College. He supervises MPhil and PhD students of world and imperial history.

Sivasundaram was awarded the Philip Leverhulme Prize for medieval, early modern and modern history in 2012. He was a fellow and council member of the Royal Historical Society (RHS). He delivered the 2019 RHS Prothero Lecture. He was co-editor of The Historical Journal and was associate editor of the Journal of British Studies. He is on the editorial boards of History Australia, The International History Review and Medical History.

He won the 2021 British Academy Book Prize for Global Cultural Understanding for Waves Across the South. His prize citation noted that the book was 'a riot of ingenuity, a truly powerful and new history of revolutions and empires, re-imagined through the environmental lens of the sea.'

He is a member of the Editorial Board for Past & Present. He was elected a Fellow of the British Academy in 2023.

== Works ==
Sivasundaram has written numerous books and articles including:

- Nature and the Godly Empire: Science and Evangelical Mission in the Pacific, 1795-1850 (2005, Cambridge University Press; ISBN 9780521188883, 0521188881, 9780521848367, 0521848369)
- Science, Race and Imperialism ed. with Marwa Elshakry in Victorian Science and Literature, Vol 6, eds. Bernard Lightman and Gowan Dawson (2012, Pickering & Chatto Publishers; ISBN 9781848930926, 1848930925)
- Islanded: Britain, Sri Lanka and the Bounds of an Indian Ocean Colony (2013, University of Chicago Press; 2014, Oxford University Press, Delhi; ISBN 9780198096245, 0198096240)
- Oceanic Histories ed. with David Armitage and Alison Bashford (2017, Cambridge University Press; ISBN 9781108423182, 1108423183, 9781108434829, 1108434827)
- Waves Across the South (2020, HarperCollins)
- 'Materialities in the Making of World Histories: South Asia and the South Pacific' in Oxford Handbook of History and Material Culture: World Perspectives ed. by Ivan Gaskell and Sarah Carter
