= Islam Khan (umpire) =

Pakistani cricket umpire (born 1953)

Personal information
- Born: 26 November 1953 (age 72); Karachi, Pakistan

Umpiring information
- ODIs umpired: 2 (1994–1995)
- WODIs umpired: 3 (2004–2005)
- Source: Cricinfo, 21 May 2014

Islam Khan (born 26 November 1953) is a Pakistani former cricket umpire. Besides officiating in first-class fixtures at the domestic level, he stood in two One Day Internationals in 1994 and 1995.

== See also ==
- List of One Day International cricket umpires
