= Colombo West Polling Division =

Colombo West
- Polling Division
- Interactive map of Colombo West
- Coordinates: 6.891035°N 79.856927°E
- Country: Sri Lanka
- Province: Western Province, Sri Lanka
- Electoral District: Colombo Electoral District

Area
  - Total: 6.12 km^{2} (2.36 sq mi)

Population (2012)
  - Total: 54,682
  - Density: 8,935/km^{2} (23,140/sq mi)
- ISO 3166 code: EC-01E

The Colombo West Polling Division is a Polling Division in the Colombo Electoral District, in the Western Province, Sri Lanka.

== Presidential election results ==
=== Summary ===
The winner of Colombo West has matched the final country result 4 out of 8 times.

Year	Colombo West	Colombo Electoral District	MAE %	Sri Lanka	MAE %
2019	NDF	SLPP	29.42%	SLPP	28.50%
2015	NDF	NDF	22.90%	NDF	27.16%
2010	NDF	UPFA	27.91%	UPFA	32.90%
2005	UNP	UNP	27.88%	UPFA	30.26%
1999	UNP	PA	19.46%	PA	21.10%
1994	PA	PA	3.26%	PA	0.82%
1988	UNP	UNP	13.24%	UNP	12.00%
1982	UNP	UNP	18.64%	UNP	21.88%
Matches/Mean MAE	4/8	7/8	20.34%	8/8	21.83%

=== 2019 Sri Lankan Presidential Election ===
Party	Colombo West		Colombo Electoral District		Sri Lanka	
Party	Votes	%	Votes	%	Votes	%
NDF	21,345	73.07%	559,921	40.92%	5,564,239	41.99%
SLPP	6,644	22.74%	727,713	53.19%	6,924,255	52.25%
NMPP	647	2.21%	53,803	3.93%	418,553	3.16%
Other Parties (with < 1%)	577	1.98%	26,740	1.95%	345,452	2.61%
Valid Votes	29,213	98.46%	1,368,177	98.89%	13,252,499	98.99%
Rejected Votes	458	1.54%	15,333	1.11%	135,452	1.01%
Total Polled	29,671	73.83%	1,383,510	82.82%	13,387,951	83.71%
Registered Electors	40,187		1,670,403		15,992,568	

=== 2015 Sri Lankan Presidential Election ===
Party	Colombo West		Colombo Electoral District		Sri Lanka	
Party	Votes	%	Votes	%	Votes	%
NDF	23,915	78.99%	725,073	55.93%	6,217,162	51.28%
UPFA	6,164	20.36%	562,614	43.40%	5,768,090	47.58%
Other Parties (with < 1%)	196	0.65%	8,673	0.67%	138,200	1.14%
Valid Votes	30,275	98.94%	1,296,360	98.83%	12,123,452	98.85%
Rejected Votes	325	1.06%	15,334	1.17%	140,925	1.15%
Total Polled	30,600	75.35%	1,311,694	81.34%	12,264,377	78.69%
Registered Electors	40,609		1,612,660		15,585,942	

=== 2010 Sri Lankan Presidential Election ===
Party	Colombo West		Colombo Electoral District		Sri Lanka	
Party	Votes	%	Votes	%	Votes	%
NDF	19,211	73.80%	533,022	45.90%	4,173,185	40.15%
UPFA	6,350	24.39%	614,740	52.93%	6,015,934	57.88%
Other Parties (with < 1%)	469	1.80%	13,620	1.17%	204,494	1.97%
Valid Votes	26,030	98.32%	1,161,382	99.03%	10,393,613	99.03%
Rejected Votes	444	1.68%	11,394	0.97%	101,838	0.97%
Total Polled	26,474	68.02%	1,172,776	76.09%	10,495,451	66.70%
Registered Electors	38,921		1,541,242		15,734,587	

=== 2005 Sri Lankan Presidential Election ===
Party	Colombo West		Colombo Electoral District		Sri Lanka	
Party	Votes	%	Votes	%	Votes	%
UNP	20,475	79.16%	569,627	51.12%	4,706,366	48.43%
UPFA	5,104	19.73%	534,431	47.96%	4,887,152	50.29%
Other Parties (with < 1%)	286	1.11%	10,192	0.91%	123,521	1.27%
Valid Votes	25,865	98.48%	1,114,250	98.86%	9,717,039	98.88%
Rejected Votes	399	1.52%	12,879	1.14%	109,869	1.12%
Total Polled	26,264	68.00%	1,127,129	75.85%	9,826,908	69.51%
Registered Electors	38,621		1,486,021		14,136,979	

=== 1999 Sri Lankan Presidential Election ===
Party	Colombo West		Colombo Electoral District		Sri Lanka	
Party	Votes	%	Votes	%	Votes	%
UNP	16,531	65.35%	425,185	44.08%	3,602,748	42.71%
PA	7,327	28.96%	474,310	49.18%	4,312,157	51.12%
LDA	539	2.13%	5,000	0.52%	23,668	0.28%
Other Parties (with < 1%)	495	1.96%	16,030	1.66%	153,011	1.81%
JVP	406	1.60%	44,009	4.56%	343,927	4.08%
Valid Votes	25,298	96.58%	964,534	97.06%	8,435,754	97.69%
Rejected Votes	896	3.42%	29,197	2.94%	199,536	2.31%
Total Polled	26,194	64.03%	993,731	73.39%	8,635,290	72.17%
Registered Electors	40,908		1,354,025		11,965,536	

=== 1994 Sri Lankan Presidential Election ===
Party	Colombo West		Colombo Electoral District		Sri Lanka	
Party	Votes	%	Votes	%	Votes	%
PA	14,329	61.41%	557,708	64.82%	4,709,205	62.28%
UNP	8,557	36.67%	288,741	33.56%	2,715,283	35.91%
Other Parties (with < 1%)	446	1.91%	13,937	1.62%	137,040	1.81%
Valid Votes	23,332	98.07%	860,386	98.17%	7,561,526	98.03%
Rejected Votes	460	1.93%	16,060	1.83%	151,706	1.97%
Total Polled	23,792	64.45%	876,446	69.59%	7,713,232	69.12%
Registered Electors	36,915		1,259,484		11,158,880	

=== 1988 Sri Lankan Presidential Election ===
Party	Colombo West		Colombo Electoral District		Sri Lanka	
Party	Votes	%	Votes	%	Votes	%
UNP	14,670	62.36%	361,337	49.14%	2,569,199	50.43%
SLFP	7,473	31.77%	339,958	46.23%	2,289,857	44.95%
SLMP	1,380	5.87%	34,020	4.63%	235,701	4.63%
Valid Votes	23,523	98.57%	735,315	98.49%	5,094,754	98.24%
Rejected Votes	342	1.43%	11,295	1.51%	91,499	1.76%
Total Polled	23,865	64.12%	746,610	67.53%	5,186,256	55.87%
Registered Electors	37,220		1,105,583		9,283,143	

=== 1982 Sri Lankan Presidential Election ===
Party	Colombo West		Colombo Electoral District		Sri Lanka	
Party	Votes	%	Votes	%	Votes	%
UNP	22,115	77.52%	436,290	57.86%	3,450,815	52.93%
SLFP	4,751	16.65%	274,476	36.40%	2,546,348	39.05%
JVP	576	2.02%	28,580	3.79%	273,428	4.19%
ACTC	521	1.83%	3,022	0.40%	173,934	2.67%
LSSP	409	1.43%	9,655	1.28%	58,531	0.90%
Other Parties (with < 1%)	156	0.55%	2,008	0.27%	16,995	0.26%
Valid Votes	28,528	98.91%	754,031	98.95%	6,520,156	98.78%
Rejected Votes	314	1.09%	7,990	1.05%	80,470	1.22%
Total Polled	28,842	71.44%	762,021	76.88%	6,600,626	80.15%
Registered Electors	40,375		991,194		8,235,358	

== Parliamentary election results ==
=== Summary ===
The winner of Colombo West has matched the final country result 3 out of 7 times.

Year	Colombo West	Colombo Electoral District	MAE %	Sri Lanka	MAE %
2020	SJB	SLPFA		SLPFA	
2015	UNP	UNP	24.10%	UNP	27.44%
2010	UNP	UPFA	23.80%	UPFA	31.50%
2004	UNP	UNP	24.50%	UPFA	28.36%
2001	UNP	UNP	14.62%	UNP	18.50%
2000	UNP	UNP	15.17%	PA	20.00%
1994	UNP	PA	12.09%	PA	9.85%
1989	UNP	UNP	11.47%	UNP	12.57%
Matches/Mean MAE	3/8	6/8		8/8	

=== 2020 Sri Lankan Parliamentary Election ===
Party	Colombo West		Colombo Electoral District		Sri Lanka	
Party	Votes	%	Votes	%	Votes	%
SJB	16,521	64.82%	387,145	32.73%	2,771,984	23.9%
SLPFA	6,294	24.69%	674,603	57.04%	6,853,693	59.09%
UNP	1,143	4.48%	30,875	2.61%	249,435	2.15%
JJB	1,074	4.21%	67,600	5.72%	445,958	3.84%
Other Parties (with < 1%)	457	1.8%	22,553	1.9%	1,227,859	11.02%
Valid Votes	25,489	60.93%	1,182,776	69.2%	11,598,936	71.32%
Rejected Votes	1,545	3.69%	81,034	4.74%	744,373	4.58%
Total Polled	27,034	64.63%	1,263,810	73.94%	12,343,309	75.89%
Registered Electors	41,831		1,709,209		16,263,885	

=== 2015 Sri Lankan Parliamentary Election ===
Party	Colombo West		Colombo Electoral District		Sri Lanka	
Party	Votes	%	Votes	%	Votes	%
UNP	22,060	80.31%	640,743	53.04%	5,098,916	45.77%
UPFA	4,204	15.31%	474,063	39.25%	4,732,664	42.48%
JVP	875	3.19%	81,391	6.74%	544,154	4.88%
Other Parties (with < 1%)	328	1.19%	11,752	0.97%	93,045	0.84%
Valid Votes	27,467	95.45%	1,207,949	96.46%	11,140,333	95.35%
Rejected Votes	1,237	4.30%	43,372	3.46%	516,926	4.42%
Total Polled	28,775	70.86%	1,252,271	78.93%	11,684,111	77.66%
Registered Electors	40,609		1,586,598		15,044,490	

=== 2010 Sri Lankan Parliamentary Election ===
Party	Colombo West		Colombo Electoral District		Sri Lanka	
Party	Votes	%	Votes	%	Votes	%
UNP	13,056	64.33%	339,750	36.19%	2,357,057	29.37%
UPFA	5,169	25.47%	480,896	51.23%	4,846,388	60.38%
DNA	1,675	8.25%	110,683	11.79%	441,251	5.50%
Other Parties (with < 1%)	394	1.94%	7,292	0.78%	48,240	0.60%
Valid Votes	20,294	93.98%	938,723	94.85%	8,026,322	96.03%
Rejected Votes	1,283	5.94%	50,354	5.09%	581,465	6.96%
Total Polled	21,594	55.48%	989,729	64.17%	8,358,246	59.29%
Registered Electors	38,921		1,542,457		14,097,690	

=== 2004 Sri Lankan Parliamentary Election ===
Party	Colombo West		Colombo Electoral District		Sri Lanka	
Party	Votes	%	Votes	%	Votes	%
UNP	19,084	73.65%	441,841	41.77%	3,486,792	37.73%
UPFA	3,613	13.94%	414,688	39.20%	4,223,126	45.70%
JHU	2,824	10.90%	190,618	18.02%	552,723	5.98%
Other Parties (with < 1%)	390	1.51%	10,713	1.01%	90,868	0.98%
Valid Votes	25,911	96.74%	1,057,860	96.47%	9,241,931	94.52%
Rejected Votes	869	3.24%	38,605	3.52%	534,452	5.47%
Total Polled	26,783	66.61%	1,096,571	74.71%	9,777,821	75.74%
Registered Electors	40,209		1,467,751		12,909,631	

=== 2001 Sri Lankan Parliamentary Election ===
Party	Colombo West		Colombo Electoral District		Sri Lanka	
Party	Votes	%	Votes	%	Votes	%
UNP	18,020	66.03%	546,417	51.62%	4,086,026	45.62%
PA	4,053	14.85%	353,401	33.39%	3,330,815	37.19%
TULF	3,499	12.82%	12,696	1.20%	348,164	3.89%
JVP	926	3.39%	117,404	11.09%	815,353	9.10%
SU	396	1.45%	16,970	1.60%	50,665	0.57%
Other Parties (with < 1%)	395	1.45%	11,593	1.10%	162,452	1.81%
Valid Votes	27,289	96.61%	1,058,481	96.28%	8,955,844	94.77%
Rejected Votes	959	3.39%	40,901	3.72%	494,009	5.23%
Total Polled	28,248	67.40%	1,099,382	76.31%	9,449,878	76.03%
Registered Electors	41,908		1,440,682		12,428,762	

=== 2000 Sri Lankan Parliamentary Election ===
Party	Colombo West		Colombo Electoral District		Sri Lanka	
Party	Votes	%	Votes	%	Votes	%
UNP	15,480	59.79%	440,684	43.45%	3,451,765	40.12%
PA	4,999	19.31%	394,146	38.86%	3,899,329	45.33%
SU	1,418	5.48%	49,671	4.90%	127,859	1.49%
ACTC	1,371	5.30%	5,238	0.52%	27,289	0.32%
NUA	925	3.57%	27,067	2.67%	185,593	2.16%
JVP	709	2.74%	78,133	7.70%	518,725	6.03%
Other Parties (with < 1%)	698	2.70%	14,693	1.45%	139,216	1.62%
CWC	289	1.12%	4,588	0.45%	22,985	0.27%
Valid Votes	25,889	N/A	1,014,220	N/A	8,602,617	N/A

=== 1994 Sri Lankan Parliamentary Election ===
Party	Colombo West		Colombo Electoral District		Sri Lanka	
Party	Votes	%	Votes	%	Votes	%
UNP	12,983	51.06%	385,100	41.77%	3,498,370	44.04%
PA	8,977	35.31%	469,642	50.94%	3,887,805	48.94%
IND1	2,813	11.06%	9,251	1.00%	48,199	0.61%
MEP	462	1.82%	42,734	4.64%	68,538	0.86%
Other Parties (with < 1%)	190	0.75%	15,206	1.65%	93,874	1.18%
Valid Votes	25,425	96.87%	921,933	96.18%	7,943,688	95.20%
Rejected Votes	821	3.13%	36,635	3.82%	400,395	4.80%
Total Polled	26,246	71.10%	958,568	76.04%	8,344,095	74.75%
Registered Electors	36,915		1,260,686		11,163,064	

=== 1989 Sri Lankan Parliamentary Election ===
Party	Colombo West		Colombo Electoral District		Sri Lanka	
Party	Votes	%	Votes	%	Votes	%
UNP	15,265	66.25%	374,530	51.67%	2,838,005	50.71%
SLFP	4,100	17.79%	205,053	28.29%	1,785,369	31.90%
USA	1,502	6.52%	31,873	4.40%	141,983	2.54%
SLMC	1,259	5.46%	29,308	4.04%	202,016	3.61%
MEP	669	2.90%	76,966	10.62%	90,480	1.62%
ELJP	247	1.07%	7,112	0.98%	67,723	1.21%
Valid Votes	23,042	96.04%	724,842	95.36%	5,596,468	93.87%
Rejected Votes	949	3.96%	35,271	4.64%	365,563	6.13%
Total Polled	23,991	65.16%	760,113	69.87%	5,962,031	63.60%
Registered Electors	36,820		1,087,891		9,374,164	

== Demographics ==
=== Ethnicity ===
The Colombo West Polling Division has a Sri Lankan Tamil plurality (40.2%), a significant Sinhalese population (34.1%) and a significant Moor population (19.2%) In comparison, the Colombo Electoral District (which contains the Colombo West Polling Division) has a Sinhalese majority (76.5%), a significant Moor population (10.7%) and a significant Sri Lankan Tamil population (10.1%)

Ethnicity in Colombo West
1. Sri Lankan Tamil (40.2%)
2. Sinhalese (34.1%)
3. Moor (19.2%)
4. Indian Tamil (2.60%)
5. Other (2.00%)
6. Other (1.80%)

=== Religion ===
The Colombo West Polling Division has a Hindu plurality of 36.3%, a Buddhist population of 27.7% and a Muslim population of 21.6%. In comparison, the Colombo Electoral District (which contains the Colombo West Polling Division) has a Buddhist majority of 70.2% and a Muslim population of 11.8%.

Religion in Colombo West
1. Hindu (36.3%)
2. Buddhist (27.7%)
3. Muslim (21.6%)
4. Roman Catholic (8.30%)
5. Other Christian (5.60%)
6. Other (0.40%)
