= École internationale Kandy =

école internationale

Location
- 85 Lady Gorden's Drive; Kandy, Central Province; Sri Lanka
- Coordinates: 7.291404°N 80.733686°E

Information
- Type: International School
- Motto: Committed for a better nation
- Established: 1980
- Director: Manel Rajapakse (1930 - 2024); Chandre Monarewela
- Principal: S. K. B. Weerakoon (Digana); Leonard de Alwis (Kandy)
- Grades: 1-11
- Gender: Both Sex
- Language: English
- Hours in school day: Mon-Fri: 07.45-13.30
- Houses: Blue, Gold and Maroon
- Website: www.ecolekandy.com

école Internationale is a private English-medium international school in Kandy, Sri Lanka. It is the first international School in the central province.

== History ==
The school was founded in 1980 by Manel Rajapakse at 85 Lady Gordon’s Drive, with a handful of foreign students. To accommodate the increased intake of local students, a new branch was opened in 1991 at Digana for senior grades. The junior school remained in Kandy.

== Curriculum ==
The school integrates curricula from the British and American education systems at the primary school level. Senior students are directed towards the British curriculum, culminating in Edexcel International GCSE, GCE AS, and A2 qualifications. Additionally, since 2014, the Sri Lankan local curriculum has been offered as an option from secondary school level onwards.

== Facilities and extracurricular activities ==
Extracurricular activities at the school include sports, music, literature, drama and other activities. The academic facilities include biology, physics and chemistry laboratories, a computer lab, reference library with internet access and multimedia-based education. Sports facilities include a swimming pool,a netball court, playground and a gymnasium for indoor sports. Yoga and karate are also available, coached by professionals.

== Insurance Policy ==
In 2014, the school announced an insurance policy agreement with Ceylinco Life, allowing students to continue their education at the school in the event of the premature death or disability of their parents.
