= Crescent Schools International =

Location
- Colombo, Wellampitiya and Ratnapura; Sri Lanka

Information
- Type: International School
- Motto: Arabic:Subhan'Allah ("Glory Be To Allah")
- Established: 1986
- Principal: A.H.H.M.Murthaja
- Staff: 80
- Grades: LKG - Grade 11
- Age: 4 to 17
- Enrollment: 1500
- Language: English
- Colour(s): Green and blue
- Affiliation: Muslim
- Website: www.crescentschools.org

Crescent Schools International (also called Crescent International School and abbreviated as C.S.I.), is an international school in Sri Lanka, with four branches in Colombo 9, Colombo 15, Wellampitiya and Ratnapura. It was established in 1986 with a view to provide quality education in English medium in an Islamic environment.

The school has expanded over the last 25 years and is today managed by a Corporate Management Team (C.M.T) and staffed with a teacher panel of over 80 teachers. CSI is attended by approximately thousand five hundred students and has classes ranging from Preschool to Ordinary Level.

The current Principal of CSI is former Government Zonal Education Officer Mr. M.M.M. Aiyub. The management of the school is handle by Dr. Deepika Priyadharshani and the school CMT team. Former Principals of CSI include Mr. Imtiaz Muhsin.

== Studies and Annual Events ==
CSI currently follows the Local-Curriculum, which is a subject-formatting set by the Ministry of Education that is now being followed by the majority of schools of Sri Lanka.

CSI holds annual extracurricular activities such as:

- Annual Sports Meet
- Annual Awards Ceremony
- Educational Tours
- Independence Day Celebration
- English Day
- Sinhala And Tamil Literacy Day
- Prefects' Day
- Islamic Day
- Debate Programme
- Children's Day Celebrations

CSI Students also participate in inter-school extracurricular events and competitions. CSI Student Asmara Agus became 1st runner-up at the 2008 CIMA Spellmaster event from amongst 1200 students from 240 schools.
