= Manrick Singh =

Malaysian cricketer

Personal information
- Born: 30 November 1986 (age 39); Ipoh, Perak, Malaysia
- Batting: Right-handed
- Bowling: Right-arm medium-fast
- Source: CricketArchive, 6 January 2008

Manrick Singh (Punjabi: ਮਨਿਕ ਸਿੰਘ, romanized: Manika sigha; born 30 November 1986) is a Malaysian cricketer. A right-handed batsman and right-arm medium-fast bowler, he has played for the Malaysia national cricket team since 2003.

== Biography ==
Born in Ipoh in 1986, Manrick Singh first represented Malaysia at Under-19 level, playing in the 2003 Youth Asia Cup, a tournament in which Malaysia reached the final before losing to Nepal. He made his debut for the senior side in the annual Saudara Cup match against Singapore in September 2003.

In 2004, after playing the Saudara Cup match against Singapore, he made his first-class debut against the UAE in the ICC Intercontinental Cup. He also played an ACC Fast Track Countries Tournament match against Hong Kong that year. In 2005, he played in the Stan Nagaiah Trophy series against Singapore for the first time, also playing in the Saudara Cup match and three Fast Track Countries tournament matches before playing for the Under-19s for a final time in the ACC Under-19 Cup in Nepal.

He most recently represented his country at the ACC Twenty20 Cup in Kuwait in October 2007, playing matches against Qatar and Afghanistan in that tournament.
