= Elizabeth Moir School =

International school in Colombo, Sri Lanka

Coordinates: 6.8868°N 79.8749°E

- 7, Kirimandala Mawatha, Colombo 5 (Senior school); Sri Lanka

Information
- Type: Independent international co-educational day school
- Founded: 1996
- Founder: Elizabeth Moir MBE
- Age range: 2–18
- Enrollment: 520
- Student to teacher ratio: 6:1
- Language: English
- Percentage of Sri Lankans: 45%
- Percentage of non-nationals: 55%
- Student variation: 74 countries
- Percentage on scholarship: 8%
- Website: elizabethmoirschool.com

Elizabeth Moir School is a co-educational, international day school in Colombo, Sri Lanka, founded in 1996. It is attended by children aged 2 through 18, consisting of a wide variety of nationalities. Since its founding, Elizabeth Moir School has enrolled students from over 74 different countries. As of 2024, approximately 45% of its students are from Sri Lanka; the remainder are from expatriate families residing in Sri Lanka.

== History ==
Elizabeth Moir moved to Sri Lanka in 1982 with her husband and three children. Previously she had been associated with international schools in Hong Kong and New Delhi. She founded Colombo International School months after arriving in Colombo, followed by the British School in Colombo some years later.

In 1996, she founded the Elizabeth Moir School, where she is currently the principal.

== Students ==
Currently, there are approximately 520 students attending the school, of whom 70% are from Sri Lanka and 30% are expatriates.

== Curriculum ==
The Senior School Entrance

Elizabeth Moir School uses the British education system. Students sit for IGCSE and Advanced Level examinations, set by Edexcel in Sri Lanka, and have had the best results of any international school outside the United Kingdom in both 2015 at Advanced Level, with 38% A*, and in 2016 at IGCSE, with 64% A*.

=== Senior School ===
The Senior School classes are Form 1–5, Lower 6th, and Upper 6th. In Form 4, students begin IGCSE courses and sit for examinations set by Edexcel and marked in London, which usually contain eight to ten subjects. The available courses are:

- English Language
- English Literature
- Mathematics
- Further Mathematics
- Physics
- Chemistry
- Biology
- Human Biology
- History
- Geography
- ICT
- Mandarin
- French
- Sinhala
- Tamil
- Art
- Economics

In the Lower 6th, students begin the Advanced Level and they sit for examinations set and marked by Edexcel, which contain three, four, or five subjects. Courses taught at this level are:

- Mathematics
- Further Mathematics
- Computer Science
- Physics
- Chemistry
- Biology
- History
- English Literature
- Geography
- Economics

== Sports ==
Elizabeth Moir School concentrates mainly on team sports—including football, cricket, basketball, swimming, and athletics—with both boys' and girls' squads in both schools for most age groups.

Football is currently the strongest sport, with the Under 19 Team having been International Schools Champion several times and having beaten many top national schools. Both the boys' and girls' squads compete in Malaysia annually.

The Boys' Under 19 Cricket Team, while coached by Rumesh Ratnayake, was frequently the International Schools' Champion.

There are basketball squads for both boys and girls throughout both schools, and they compete with other schools and clubs in Sri Lanka and Malaysia.

Moir School has squads for both athletics and swimming consisting of about fifty boys and girls from ages 6 to 18. Elizabeth Moir School hosts an annual four way swimming meet for the four main international schools in Colombo at the fifty-metre Air Force Pool in Ratmalana.

The school has had, and still has, several national athletes and swimmers who train daily. They have also had students who represented Sri Lanka in rowing, cricket, and squash.

== Performing and creative arts ==
From an early age, students are encouraged to participate in the performing and creative arts. There are very popular and successful programs in singing, instrumental music,cooking, drama, mime, dance, debating, and art.

There are daily assemblies at both schools, and students get regular practice speaking into a microphone and performing in front of an audience.

In the senior school, there are interhouse competitions in singing and dance, drama, debating, general knowledge, film, and art, which enables teachers to select students to represent the school at inter-school events.

The senior school choir is frequently invited to perform at the Royal College Choirs Festival and also for the Edexcel Awards Ceremony at the BMICH. Every other year, they are joined by the Junior and Infant Choirs for Carols at school with Chamber Choirs from Royal and Trinity.

Elizabeth Moir School stages both junior school and senior school plays, musicals, and concerts at the Lionel Wendt Theatre, the top theatre in Colombo. Past performances have included 12 Angry Jurors, Crucible, A Few Good Men, Annie, Antigone, The Ramayana, Charlie and the Chocolate Factory, Whose Life is it Anyway, and Footloose.

Both the junior and senior schools have annual art exhibitions at the Lionel Wendt and Barefoot Galleries in Colombo.

They have debate and quiz teams who compete regularly with other schools.

== School trips, internships and community service ==
The juniors have regular trips throughout the year, primarily in the Colombo area.

There are frequent senior school trips to Paris for the French students, Beijing for the Mandarin students, St. John's College Jaffna for the Community Service students, the Cultural Triangle and Ancient Capitals of Sri Lanka for the Middle School History students, the National University of Singapore for the Advanced Level Science students, and Malaysia for the football, cricket, and basketball squads, with another trip to Thailand being planned. Leadership camps with white water rafting, abseiling, and other adventure sports are organized at Kitulgala and elsewhere for students from Form 4 upwards.

Senior students are encouraged to do internships during their holidays, including at Beijing University, the United Nations in New York, Game Parks in South Africa and Rwanda, a hospital in Colombo for kidney transplant operations, Flying School in Ratmalana, offices of architects, offices of lawyers, and IT firms in Colombo.

Each year, all students take part in a community service project with their class. In addition, students volunteer to teach English to young boys every week at the Salvation Army Boys' Home. The Sixth Form has an ongoing project with the Foundation of Goodness near Galle, which is also promoted by Mahela Jayawardena and Kumar Sangakkara. Along with the boys of Trinity College Kandy, students also work in deprived villages between Colombo and Kandy, under the auspices of Sri Lanka Unites, a student-driven project promoting unity in the island.
