= St. Lawrence's Church, Wellawatte =

Roman Catholic church in Wellawatte, Sri Lanka

St. Lawrence's Church
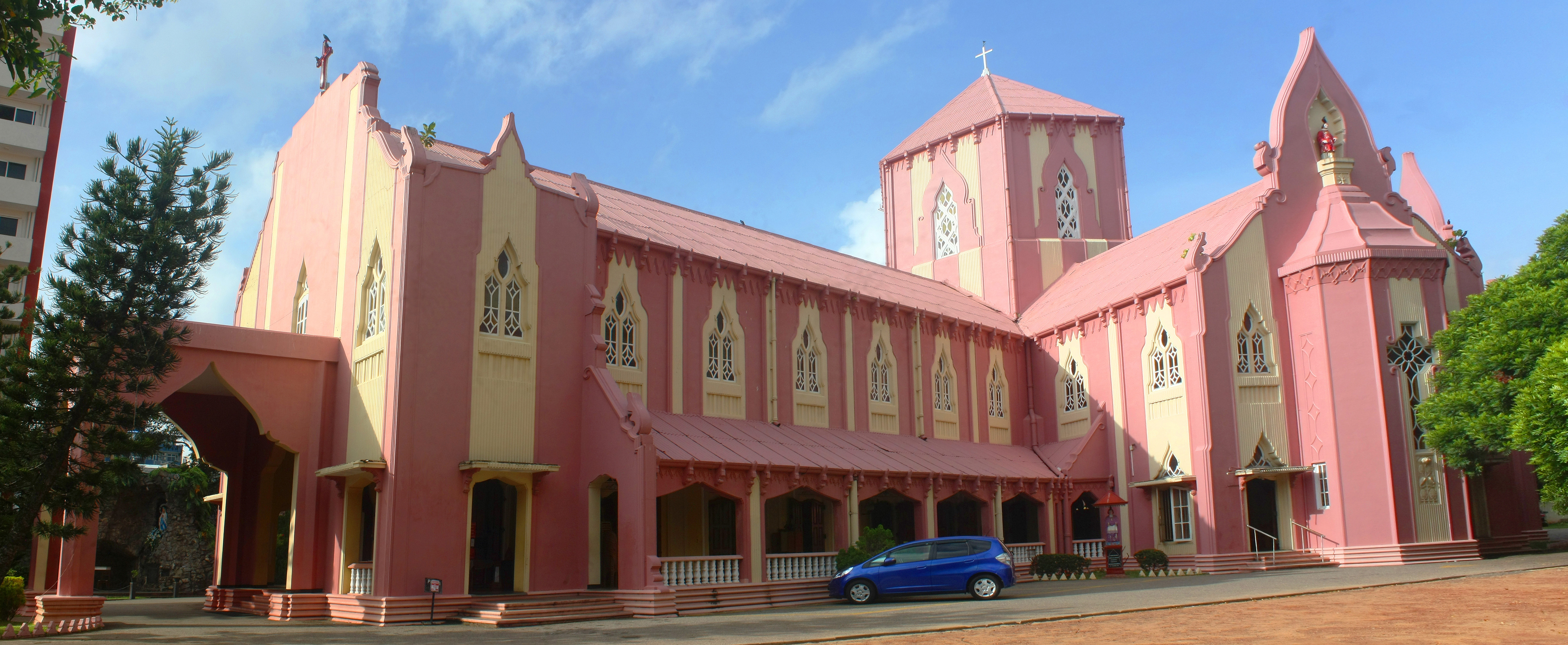

- Location within Colombo Municipality

Religion
- Affiliation: Roman Catholic
- Year consecrated: 1968
- Status: Active

Location
- Location: Wellawatte, Colombo, Sri Lanka
- Interactive map of St. Lawrence's Church
- Coordinates: 6°52′14.9″N 79°51′48.3″E

Architecture
- Groundbreaking: 17 January 1954
- Completed: 6 March 1968
- Direction of façade: West

St. Lawrence's Church is the seat of the Wellawatte parish of Roman Catholic Archdiocese of Colombo. It is located at Galle Road (near Pereira Lane), Wellawatte, Colombo 06. The church is dedicated to St. Lawrence, the patron saint of Sri Lanka, Colombo and parish of Wellawatte.

On 6 January 1938 the Archbishop of Colombo, Jean-Marie Masson inaugurated the new Parish of Wellawatte. The original St Lawrence's Church was built at Villa Pleasant (which was renamed St Lawrence Road) and Rev. Robert Fernando was appointed as its first priest. Fernando realised that the Church was too small for the congregation and purchased a parcel of land at 375 Galle Road, Wellawatte. On 17 January 1954 the Archbishop of Colombo, Thomas Cooray laid the foundation stone for the new church. Construction took fourteen years to complete, with the church being consecrated on 6 March 1968 by Cardinal Cooray.
