= British School in Colombo =

Location
- 63 Elvitigala Mawatha; Colombo; Sri Lanka; 6°54′21″N 79°52′38.12″E

Information
- Other name: BSC
- Type: Private, day, international school
- Established: 1994
- Founder: Elizabeth Moir
- Principal: Mrs Hannah Wells
- Gender: Coeducational
- Enrolment: 1314 (2023-2024)
- Website: britishschool.lk

The British School in Colombo is a private international school in Borella, a suburb of Colombo, Sri Lanka.

== History ==
The British School in Colombo was founded by British educator Elizabeth Moir in 1994. She had previously founded Colombo International School twelve years earlier. In 2005 BSC moved to its current site in Borella.

== Curriculum ==
Students in Key Stage 4 (Years 10 and 11) prepare for the IGCSEs. Compulsory subjects are English Language, English Literature and Mathematics as well as the none-exam subjects of PE (Physical Education) and PSHE.

Students in Sixth Form (Years 12 and 13) prepare for the GCE A Levels. Exams are validated by Cambridge International Examinations. Subjects offered include Accounting, Art, Biology, Business Studies, Chemistry, Computer Science, Drama, Economics, English Literature, French, Further Mathematics, Mandarin, History, Mathematics, ICT, PE, Physics and Psychology.
