= K. G. Lakshminarayan =

Indian cricket umpire (born 1953)

Personal information
- Born: 31 March 1953 (age 73); Coimbatore, India

Umpiring information
- ODIs umpired: 1 (2002)
- Source: ESPNcricinfo, 25 May 2014

K. G. Lakshminarayan (born 31 March 1953) is a former Indian cricket umpire. At the international level, he has only stood in one ODI game, in 2002.

== See also ==
- List of One Day International cricket umpires
