= Wellawatte =

Wellawatta වැල්ලවත්ත வெள்ளவத்தை
- Suburb
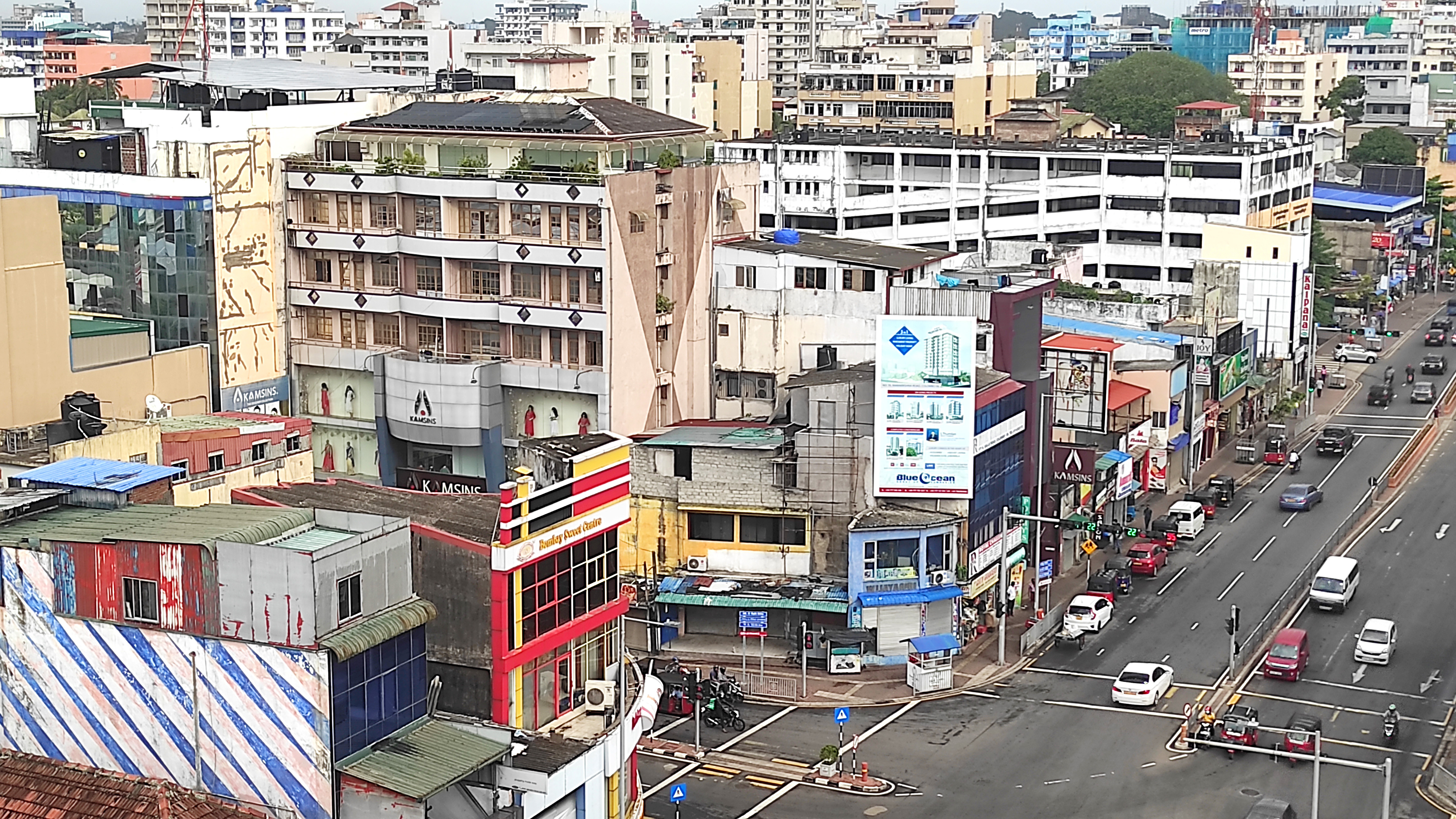
- Wellawatta junction that connects to the railway station

- Location in Colombo District Wellawatta (Sri Lanka)
- Coordinates: 6°52′29″N 79°51′38″E
- Country: Sri Lanka
- Province: Western Province
- District: Colombo District
- Time zone: UTC+5:30 (Sri Lanka Standard Time Zone)
- Postal Code: 00600

Wellawatta is a neighbourhood of Colombo, Sri Lanka. It lies immediately south of Bambalapitiya and is classified as zone 6 within the Colombo Municipal region. The town begins at the old Dutch canal just before the Savoy Cinema and extends south to the same canal that reaches the sea just before the junction at Hospital Road where Dehiwela begins. It is bounded on the west by the waters of the Indian Ocean and extends to Pamankada where Havelock Road forks and meets the Sri Saranankara Road bridge, which stretches over the Dutch canal, extending towards Kohuwala-Hospital Road junction on Dutugemunu Street.

The name Wellawatta means 'Sandy Garden' in Sinhalese and 'White Garden' in Tamil.

During the colonial period, much of present day Wellawatta was made of coconut estates owned by European families, particularly that of Charlemont Jonathan Gauder. Many of the roads and place names bear the names of the Gauder family including Charlemont, Frederica, Collingwood, Alexandra and Frances. The landmark Savoy cinema was built by CV De Silva in the 1940s. In the 1980s, the area drew many Tamils fleeing the civil war from the north of the country. Today, Wellawatta is a built up commercial and residential area with a small amount of light industry. Posh new apartment complexes coexist with slums particularly along the canal areas.

== Schools ==
- Amal International School
- Arethusa College
- Lumbini College (Primary section)
- Saiva Mangaiyar Vidyalayam
- St. Clares College
- St. Lawrence's Convent

== Art and religious centres ==
- Sri Dharmodaya Temple
- Sri Jayasinharamaya Temple
- Boddhirukkaramaya Temple
- Colombo Tamil Association
- Ramakrishna Mission
- Aishwarya Lakshmi Kovil
- Mayurapathy Amman Kovil
- Sri Kannagi Amman Kovil
- Visakha Pillaiyar Kovil
- Muhiyadeen Jumu’ah Mosque
- Wellawatta Jumu’ah Mosque
- St. Lawrence's Church, Wellawatte
