= Ariffin Ramly =

Malaysian cricketer (born 1986)

Personal information
- Full name: Mohammad Ariffin Ramly
- Born: 3 February 1986 (age 40); Malaysia
- Batting: Right-handed
- Bowling: Right-arm medium
- Source: CricketArchive, 6 January 2008

Mohammad Ariffin Ramly is a Malaysian cricketer. A right-handed batsman and right-arm medium pace bowler, he has played for the Malaysia national cricket team since 2002.

== Biography ==
Born in Malaysia in 1986, first represented Malaysia at Under-13 level, playing in the U-13 Tuanku Ja'afar Cup (South East Asian Championships) held in Kuala Lumpur in the year 1999. He was a member of the U-15 Malaysian team which took part in the ACC Under-15 Trophy in Kuala Lumpur in July 2000. He played in the ICC Under-17 Asia Cup the same month and in the ACC Under-17 Asia Cup the following year. He made his debut for the Malaysian senior side in the annual Saudara Cup match against Singapore in August 2002.

In 2003, after playing one match in the Stan Nagaiah Trophy series, he played for Malaysia Under-19s in the Youth Asia Cup in Karachi. The following year, he played for a Malaysia Cricket Association Invitation XI against England A, and a Stan Nagaiah Trophy match against Singapore before taking part in the ACC Trophy. He made his first-class debut in September 2004, playing against the UAE in the ICC Intercontinental Cup. He finished the year with an ACC Fast Track Countries Tournament match against Hong Kong.

The following year, after playing in the Saudara Cup match, he represented Malaysia Under-19s in the ACC Under-19 Cup. He played in the Stan Nagaiah Trophy in 2006, before playing once in that year's ACC Trophy, the seventh place play-off against Qatar. He most recently played for Malaysia in the Saudara Cup match of 2006.
