= Asad Haider =

American political theorist (1987–2025)

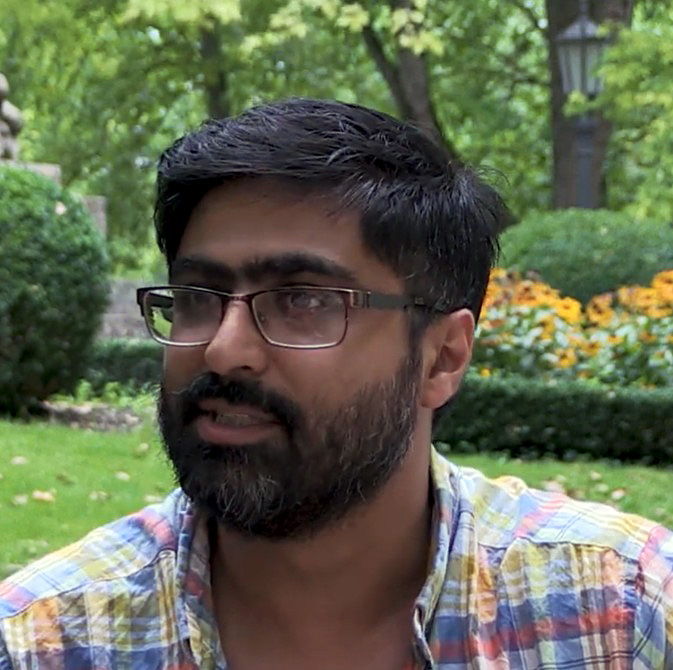
- Born: June 2, 1987; State College, Pennsylvania
- Died: December 4, 2025 (aged 38); Toronto, Canada
- Occupation: Political theorist
- Known for: Mistaken Identity (2018); Viewpoint magazine (2011–)

Academic background
- Education: Cornell University (BA, 2009); University of California, Santa Cruz (PhD, 2018)

Academic work
- Discipline: Political theorist
- Sub-discipline: Marxist; Historical materialist
- Institutions: New School for Social Research; York University (2021–2025)

Asad Haider (June 2, 1987 – December 4, 2025) was an American political theorist known for his critiques of contemporary identity politics and his work in the Marxist and historical materialist traditions.

== Early life and education ==
Haider was born June 2, 1987, in State College, Pennsylvania. Jawaid Haider, his father, taught architecture at Penn State. His mother, Talat Azhar, became an academic administrator. His parents were immigrants from Pakistan, the family spoke Urdu at home, and Haider spent summers with other family members in Karachi.

He received his bachelor's degree from Cornell University in 2009. From June to December 2010, Haider worked as a writer and publicist for the commercial photography and video production company Wonderful Machine. In 2011, he became founding editor of the Marxist annual journal Viewpoint Magazine together with the historian Salar Mohandesi, beginning with an issue on the Occupy Wall Street movement. He studied in the history of consciousness program at the University of California, Santa Cruz and graduated with his Ph.D. in 2018.

== Career ==
In 2018 Haider published the book Mistaken Identity: Race and Class in the Age of Trump, which established him as a leftist critic of identity politics.

After an Andrew W. Mellon Postdoctoral Fellowship in the philosophy department at Penn State, Haider became a visiting assistant professor of philosophy at the New School for Social Research in New York City.

In 2021, Haider became a professor at York University in Toronto.

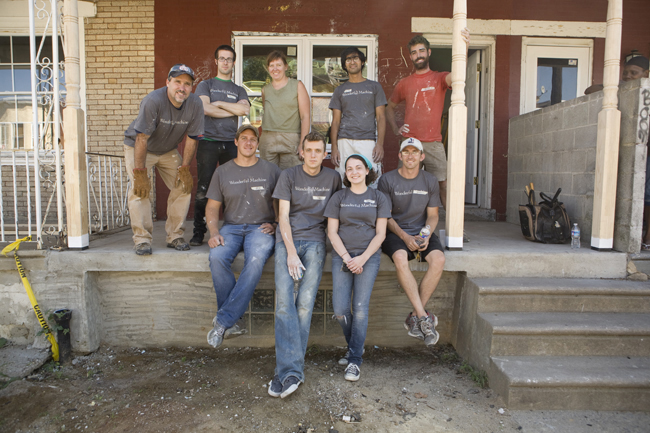
Haider, standing second from right, in 2010

== Death ==
Haider died in Toronto on December 4, 2025. The New York Times reported that according to his twin brother, "[Haider's] death was caused by injuries resulting from a fall from an apartment building," and "police had ruled out foul play."

== Selected bibliography ==
=== Book ===
- Haider, Asad (2018). Mistaken Identity: Race and Class in the Age of Trump. London; Brooklyn, NY: Verso. ISBN 978-1786637376.

=== Articles ===
- Haider, Asad (October 2020). "Identity: Words and Sequences". History of the Present. 10 (2): 237–255. JSTOR 48678275.
- Haider, Asad (March 2021). "Authoritarianism and Ideology". CLCWeb: Comparative Literature and Culture. 23 (1). doi:10.7771/1481-4374.4011.
