= Oman Cricket =

Governining body of cricket in Oman

Oman Cricket Board
- Sport: Cricket
- Jurisdiction: Oman
- Abbreviation: OCB
- Founded: 2013; 13 years ago
- Affiliation: International Cricket Council
- Affiliation date: 2000; 26 years ago
- Regional affiliation: Asian Cricket Council
- Affiliation date: 2000; 26 years ago
- Headquarters: Muscat, Oman
- Chairman: Pankaj Khimji
- CEO: Adnan Ilyas
- Secretary: Arun Poulose
- Sponsor: Oman Air Oman LNG

Official website
- www.omancricket.org
- (Oman)

The Oman Cricket Board, known as Oman Cricket for marketing purposes, is the official governing body of the sport of cricket in Oman. Its headquarters are located in Muscat, Oman. The Oman Cricket Board is Oman's representative at the International Cricket Council, having gained affiliate membership in 2000 and associate membership in 2014. It is also a member of the Asian Cricket Council.

In 2021, Oman was awarded six first-round matches in the 2021 ICC Men's T20 World Cup, with the remainder to be hosted in the United Arab Emirates. The tournament was originally scheduled to be hosted in India, and the Board of Control for Cricket in India (BCCI) retained hosting rights, working collaboratively with Oman Cricket and the Emirates Cricket Board (ECB) to stage the tournament. Oman Cricket chairman Pankaj Khimji was appointed vice president of Asian Cricket Council from 2022-23.

== See also ==
- Cricket in Oman
- Oman national cricket team
- Oman women's national cricket team
- Oman national under-19 cricket team
