= Colombo International School =

- කොළඹ ජාත්‍යන්තර පාසල; கொழும்பு சர்வதேச பள்ளி

Location
- R.G Senanayake Mawatha, Colombo 7 Sri Lanka; 6°54′31.9″N 79°52′15.6″E

Information
- Other name: CIS
- Type: Co-educational private school
- Religious affiliation: Secular
- Established: 1982
- Founder: Elizabeth Moir Tenduf-La
- Principal: Sarah Philipps (2018–present)
- Years offered: Pre-K to Year 13
- Gender: Co-educational
- Age range: 2-18
- Education system: Pearson Edexcel Curriculum
- Language: English, Sinhala, Tamil
- Hours in school day: 6:30 – 2:30
- Campus size: ~10,000m²
- Colors: Red and white
- Song: From many different countries, we come to CIS
- Rival: Wyrcherley International School
- Alumni name: Colombians, CIS'ians
- Chairman: Armyne Wirasinha
- Enrollment (main branch): ~1900
- Enrollment (Kandy branch): ~700
- Website: www.cis.lk

Colombo International School (CIS) is a private co-educational school in Colombo, Sri Lanka. It was founded in 1982 by Elizabeth Moir and employs an English-medium edexcel based curriculum.

In 1998, the school was expanded by the new chairman of the board of directors, Armyne Wirasinha, who created a new branch, Colombo International School Kandy, in Mawilmada.

The school provides a British curriculum-based education system which includes the IGCSE Examination for grades 10 and 11 and International Advanced Level for 6th form.

== History ==
=== Establishment ===
Colombo International School was established in 1982, shortly after Elizabeth Moir arrived in Sri Lanka.

The school did not initially have a campus but instead operated out of various repurposed residential buildings and homes. Students were trained to sit for the London Ordinary and Advanced Level examinations, before later transitioning to the Pearson Edexcel qualification.

The school is officially registered as a company under the Companies Act of 1982, making its full registered name Colombo International School (Private) Ltd. As an international school, it is under the authority of the Board of Investment of Sri Lanka and is not subject to many of the regulations imposed by the Ministry of Education.

== Campus and facilities ==
The school is split into two branches. The main branch, situated on Gregory's Road, Colombo 7, admits approximately 1600 students per year, with an average of thirty students per class. The Kandy branch is located off Aluthgantota Road, Mawilmada, and admits approximately half that of the main branch: 700 students per year.

=== Main branch ===
The main branch campus is next to the Sri Sambodhi Maha Viharaya and is split in two by the Ven. Panadure Ariyadhamma Himi Mawatha, which connects the east-facing Srimath R.G Senanayake Mawatha to the south-east bound Wijerama Mawatha.

=== Kandy branch ===
The Kandy branch is situated next to the Paranagantota Road, Mawilmada.

The campus houses facilities for sports such as netball, basketball and cricket, as well as those for the performing arts and yearly staged productions.

== Notable events and controversies ==
=== Sexual education textbook controversy ===
In 2010, the National Child Protection Authority commenced a probe against the school over the use of a sexual education textbook, Introducing Moral Issues by Joe Jenkins, in the school's sixth and fifth-grade curriculum. The probe was a result of former UNP Member of Parliament and lawyer Dinesh Dodangoda lodging a complaint with the NCPA after failing to persuade the school to remove the book from its curriculum. NCPA Chairwoman Anoma Dissanayake urged the Ministry of Education to take legal action against the school over the book's depictions of contraceptives, abortion and sexual intercourse. The school continued to defend the book and refused to remove it on the grounds that it "educated children on sex issues so that they will be better prepared for the future".

=== Rainbow flag controversy ===
In September 2018, Saakya Rajawasan, a student at CIS, was barred from participating in the senior fashion show due to attending a rehearsal wearing a rainbow flag cape, after previously having been told that the flag would not be tolerated. She was again subject to disciplinary action after attending school the following day with the cape draped over her school bag, with her behaviour being deemed 'unacceptable and irresponsible' by the acting principal.

The events that transpired were reported on with special interest by the Colombo Telegraph, an online news publication that went on to release a series of articles in support of Rajawasan. On October 8, Rajawasan issued a public statement in which she further alleged that she was denied an opportunity for prefectship on the grounds that she chose to wear trousers instead of a skirt, which went against the school's uniform for girls.

== Notable alumni ==
- Anarkali Akarsha, film and teledrama actress, model, member of Southern Provincial Council (2009–present)
- Asha de Vos, marine biologist, ocean educator and pioneer of blue whale research
- Gajendrakumar Ponnambalam, member of Parliament - Jaffna (2001–2010)
- Angajan Ramanathan, deputy chairman of Committees of Parliament and member of Parliament
- Sujit Sivasundaram, historian and academic
