= 1998 Under-19 Cricket World Cup squads =

Sixteen members of the International Cricket Council (ICC) fielded teams at the 1998 Under-19 Cricket World Cup. Some information about squad members (including playing styles, dates of births, and even full names) is unavailable, especially for ICC associate members.

== Group A ==
=== Denmark ===
Ten members of the Danish squad went on to play for the Danish senior team. One of those, Amjad Khan, also played at senior level for England. One Danish player, Freddie Klokker, was 14 years and 304 days at the start of the tournament, making him the youngest player whose age is definitely known. Denmark were competing in the Under-19 World Cup for the first time.

Player	Date of birth	Batting	Bowling style
Umar Farooq (c)	4 January 1979 (aged 19)	—	Left-arm orthodox
Rasmus Christensen	10 April 1980 (aged 17)	—	Left-arm orthodox
David Christiansen	19 April 1978 (aged 19)	Right	Right-arm medium
B. Hansen	—	—	—
Jesper Hansen	1 December 1980 (aged 17)	Right	—
Amjad Khan	14 October 1980 (aged 17)	Right	Right-arm fast-medium
Freddie Klokker (wk)	13 March 1983 (aged 14)	Left	—
Niels Kopperholdt	17 June 1979 (aged 18)	Right	Right-arm fast-medium
Andreas Lambert	2 September 1981 (aged 16)	Left	Left-arm orthodox
Jacob Larsen	12 January 1979 (aged 18)	Left	Right-arm medium
Thomas Nielsen	16 March 1974 (aged 23)	Right	Right-arm fast-medium
Troels Thøgersen	28 November 1979 (aged 18)	—	—
Peter Thomsen	9 October 1978 (aged 19)	—	—

=== Ireland ===
Four members of the Irish squad went on to play for the Irish senior team. One of those, Ed Joyce, also played at senior level for England. Ireland were competing in the Under-19 World Cup for the first time.

Player	Date of birth	Batting	Bowling style
Joseph Clinton (c)	27 June 1978 (aged 19)	Left	Right-arm medium-fast
Neil Anderson	27 February 1979 (aged 18)	Right	Left-arm orthodox
Jonathan Bushe (wk)	12 December 1978 (aged 19)	Left	—
Simon Carruthers	—	—	—
Brian Dunlop (wk)	9 October 1978 (aged 19)	—	—
David Finlay	—	—	—
Daniel Gaughran	4 December 1979 (aged 18)	Right	Right-arm medium
Simon Harrison	—	—	—
Carl Hosford	—	—	—
Ed Joyce	22 September 1978 (aged 19)	Left	Right-arm medium
Dwayne McGerrigle	12 March 1980 (aged 17)	Right	Right-arm medium
Aidan Neill	—	—	—
Keith Spelman	2 January 1980 (aged 18)	Left	Left-arm orthodox
Paul Tate	—	—	—

=== Pakistan ===
Five members of the Pakistani squad went on to play for the Pakistani senior team, including one, Hasan Raza, who had already played at senior level before appearing in the World Cup. Another squad member, Imran Tahir, played at senior level for South Africa.

Player	Date of birth	Batting	Bowling style
Bazid Khan (c)	25 March 1981 (aged 16)	Right	Right-arm off-spin
Abdul Razzaq	2 December 1979 (aged 18)	Right	Right-arm fast-medium
Hasan Raza	11 March 1982 (aged 15)	Right	Right-arm off-spin
Inam-ul-Haq	7 January 1979 (aged 19)	Right	Right-arm off-spin
Humayun Farhat (wk)	24 January 1981 (aged 16)	Right	—
Imran Tahir	27 March 1979 (aged 18)	Right	Right-arm leg-spin
Jannisar Khan	6 October 1981 (aged 16)	Right	Right-arm medium
Majeed Jahangir	3 December 1980 (aged 17)	Right	Right-arm leg-spin
Saeed Anwar	12 December 1978 (aged 19)	Left	Left-arm orthodox
Shoaib Malik	1 February 1982 (aged 15)	Right	Right-arm off-spin
Syed Wasim	6 January 1983 (aged 15)	Right	Right-arm fast-medium
Zaheer Khan	3 December 1979 (aged 18)	Right	Right-arm medium
Zahid Saeed	5 July 1981 (aged 16)	Right	Left-arm fast-medium

=== Sri Lanka ===
Four members of the Sri Lankan squad went on to play for the Sri Lankan senior team.

Player	Date of birth	Batting	Bowling style
Pradeep Hewage (c)	7 December 1978 (aged 19)	Right	Right-arm medium
Malinga Bandara	31 December 1979 (aged 18)	Right	Right-arm leg-spin
Chamara de Soysa	12 October 1978 (aged 19)	Right	Right-arm off-spin
Ranga Dias	14 August 1979 (aged 18)	Right	Right-arm fast-medium
Romesh Fernando	29 September 1977 (aged 20)	Right	Right-arm medium
Upekha Fernando	17 December 1979 (aged 18)	Right	Right-arm off-spin
Malintha Gajanayake	5 October 1980 (aged 17)	Right	Right-arm off-spin
Prasanna Jayawardene (wk)	9 October 1979 (aged 18)	Right	—
Arshad Junaid	1 January 1981 (aged 17)	Right	Right-arm off-spin
Thilina Kandamby	4 June 1982 (aged 15)	Left	Right-arm leg-spin
Naren Rattwatte	1 September 1979 (aged 18)	Left	Right-arm fast-medium
Nisitha Rupasinghe	11 July 1979 (aged 18)	Right	Left-arm orthodox
Sanjaya Rodrigo	27 February 1979 (aged 18)	Right	Right-arm leg-spin
Chamara Silva	14 December 1979 (aged 18)	Right	Right-arm leg-spin

== Group B ==
=== Australia ===
Three members of the Australian squad went on to play for the Australian senior team.

Coach: (Australia) Allan Border

Player	Date of birth	Batting	Bowling style
Tim Anderson (c)	24 November 1978 (aged 19)	Right	Right-arm medium
Steven Busbridge	30 November 1978 (aged 19)	Left	Left-arm medium-fast
Sean Clingeleffer (wk)	9 May 1980 (aged 17)	Left	—
Chris Davies	15 November 1978 (aged 19)	Right	Right-arm off-spin
James Hopes	24 October 1978 (aged 19)	Right	Right-arm medium
Michael Johnston	25 February 1979 (aged 18)	Right	Left-arm orthodox
Michael Klinger	4 July 1980 (aged 17)	Right	—
Scott Kremerskothen	5 January 1979 (aged 19)	Left	Right-arm medium
Mick Miller	30 May 1979 (aged 18)	Left	Right-arm fast-medium
Marcus North	28 July 1979 (aged 18)	Left	Right-arm off-spin
Ben Oliver	24 October 1979 (aged 18)	Right	Right-arm fast-medium
Lachlan Stevens	31 December 1978 (aged 19)	Left	Left-arm orthodox
Dominic Thornely	1 October 1978 (aged 19)	Right	Right-arm off-spin
Shannon Tubb	11 May 1980 (aged 17)	Right	Slow left-arm wrist-spin

=== Papua New Guinea ===
Eight members of the Papua New Guinean squad went on to play for the PNG senior team. Papua New Guinea were competing in the Under-19 World Cup for the first time.

Player	Date of birth	Batting	Bowling style
Christopher Alu (c)	13 September 1978 (aged 19)	Left	—
Puana Agi	21 July 1978 (aged 19)	Right	—
Daniel Alu (wk)	6 March 1979 (aged 18)	Left	—
Toua Dai	23 March 1978 (aged 19)	Right	Right-arm medium-fast
Rarva Dikana	19 October 1978 (aged 19)	Right	Right-arm medium
S. Gau	—	—	—
Jamie Iga	23 March 1978 (aged 19)	—	—
Gima Keimelo	4 December 1982 (aged 15)	Right	Right-arm fast-medium
Richard Leka	10 November 1979 (aged 18)	Right	—
Hobart Magalu	15 May 1978 (aged 19)	—	Right-arm (unknown)
Rodney Maha	20 January 1979 (aged 18)	Right	—
Roge Ravusiro	12 August 1979 (aged 18)	—	—
Ago Reva	11 October 1979 (aged 18)	—	—
Wala Vala	27 March 1980 (aged 17)	Right	Right-arm off-spin

=== West Indies ===
Six members of the West Indian squad went on to play for the West Indian senior team.

Player	Date of birth	Batting	Bowling style
Sylvester Joseph (c)	5 September 1978 (aged 19)	Right	Right-arm off spin
Wade Allen	5 March 1980 (aged 17)	—	—
Ryan Best	21 September 1981 (aged 16)	—	—
Navin Chan (wk)	29 December 1978 (aged 19)	Right	—
Chris Gayle	21 September 1979 (aged 18)	Left	Right-arm off-spin
Daren Ganga	14 January 1979 (aged 18)	Right	Right-arm off-spin
Marlon Graham	27 September 1978 (aged 19)	—	—
Ryan Hinds	17 February 1981 (aged 16)	Left	Left-arm orthodox
Asif Jan	11 February 1979 (aged 18)	Left	Left-arm medium
Stephen John	—	Left	Right-arm fast-medium
Kenroy Martin	8 January 1979 (aged 19)	Left	Right-arm medium
Homchand Pooran	14 February 1979 (aged 18)	Right	Right-arm off-spin
Marlon Samuels	5 February 1981 (aged 16)	Right	Right-arm off-spin
Ramnaresh Sarwan	23 June 1980 (aged 17)	Right	Right-arm leg-spin

=== Zimbabwe ===
Seven members of the Zimbabwean squad went on to represent the Zimbabwean senior team. Zimbabwe were competing in the Under-19 World Cup for the first time.

Player	Date of birth	Batting	Bowling style
Mark Vermeulen (c)	2 March 1979 (aged 18)	Right	Right-arm off-spin
Glen Barrett	31 March 1979 (aged 18)	Right	Right-arm medium
Colin Delport	4 August 1978 (aged 19)	Right	Right-arm off-spin
Dion Ebrahim	7 August 1980 (aged 17)	Right	Right-arm medium
Ian Engelbrecht	23 August 1980 (aged 17)	Right	Left-arm orthodox
Neil Ferreira (wk)	3 June 1979 (aged 18)	Left	—
Greg Lamb	4 March 1981 (aged 16)	Right	Right-arm off-spin
Lance Malloch-Brown	29 June 1979 (aged 18)	Right	—
Alester Maregwede (wk)	5 August 1981 (aged 16)	Right	—
Bradley McCoun	30 April 1979 (aged 18)	Right	Right-arm fast-medium
David Mutendera	25 January 1979 (aged 18)	Right	Right-arm fast-medium
Mluleki Nkala	1 April 1981 (aged 16)	Right	Right-arm medium
Stephen Wright	19 April 1982 (aged 15)	Right	Right-arm leg-spin
Jason Young	22 July 1979 (aged 18)	Right	Right-arm medium-fast

== Group C ==
=== India ===
Six members of the Indian squad went on to play for the Indian senior team.

Player	Date of birth	Batting	Bowling style
Amit Pagnis (c)	18 September 1978 (aged 19)	Left	Right-arm medium
Amit Bhandari	1 October 1978 (aged 19)	Right	Right-arm fast-medium
Mohammad Kaif	1 December 1980 (aged 17)	Right	Right-arm off-spin
Sreekumar Nair	2 November 1978 (aged 19)	Left	Left-arm orthodox
Sathiamoorty Saravanan	22 September 1978 (aged 19)	Right	Right-arm medium
Virender Sehwag	20 October 1978 (aged 19)	Right	Right-arm off-spin
Rajashekar Shanbal (wk)	1 September 1978 (aged 19)	Right	—
Laxmi Shukla	6 May 1981 (aged 16)	Right	Right-arm medium
Harbhajan Singh	3 July 1980 (aged 17)	Right	Right-arm off-spin
Sumit Panda	3 December 1979 (aged 18)	Right	Right-arm fast
Shibsagar Singh	15 September 1979 (aged 18)	Right	Left-arm orthodox
Reetinder Sodhi	18 October 1980 (aged 17)	Right	Right-arm medium
Arvind Solanki	10 September 1978 (aged 19)	Right	Right-arm medium

=== Kenya ===
Seven members of the Kenyan squad went on to play for the Kenyan senior team including one, Thomas Odoyo, who had already played at senior level before appearing in the World Cup. Kenya were competing in the Under-19 World Cup for the first time.

Player	Date of birth	Batting	Bowling style
Thomas Odoyo (c)	12 May 1978 (aged 19)	Right	Right-arm medium-fast
Josephat Ababu	14 May 1980 (aged 17)	Right	Right-arm fast-medium
Nitin Gopal	—	—	—
Santosh Gore	—	—	—
Abeed Janmohamed (wk)	10 December 1978 (aged 19)	Right	—
Jimmy Kamande	12 December 1978 (aged 19)	Right	Right-arm off-spin
F. Karmali	—	—	—
Andrew Mboya	—	—	—
Edward Mboya	—	—	—
Nimesh Modi	—	—	—
Collins Obuya	27 July 1981 (aged 16)	Right	Right-arm medium
David Obuya (wk)	14 August 1979 (aged 18)	Right	—
Francis Otieno	25 August 1979 (aged 18)	Right	Right-arm medium
Nitin Vasani	—	—	—

=== Scotland ===
Seven members of the Scottish squad went on to play for the Scottish senior team. Scotland were competing in the Under-19 World Cup for the first time.

Player	Date of birth	Batting	Bowling style
John Blain (c)	4 January 1979 (aged 19)	Right	Right-arm fast-medium
Greig Butchart	16 June 1979 (aged 18)	Right	Right-arm medium
Neil Caplan	9 February 1980 (aged 17)	—	—
Scott Dempsie (wk)	24 October 1978 (aged 19)	—	—
John Donnelly	25 October 1978 (aged 19)	Right	Right-arm medium
Alan Duncan	9 March 1980 (aged 17)	Right	Right-arm medium-fast
Ayaz Gul	29 September 1978 (aged 19)	Right	Right-arm leg-spin
Craig Mackellar	30 May 1979 (aged 18)	Right	Right-arm medium-fast
Gregor Maiden	22 July 1979 (aged 18)	Right	Right-arm off-spin
Neil Millar	3 February 1981 (aged 16)	Right	Right-arm medium
Ross Mitchinson	14 April 1978 (aged 19)	Right	Right-arm off-spin
Alan Spiers	26 January 1979 (aged 18)	Right	Right-arm medium
Euan Stubbs (wk)	23 April 1978 (aged 19)	Right	—
Fraser Watts	5 June 1979 (aged 18)	Right	Right-arm medium

=== South Africa ===
Six members of the South African squad went on to play for the South African senior team. Two other squad members, Grant Elliott and Michael Lumb, went on to play at senior level for other international teams (New Zealand and England, respectively). South Africa were competing in the Under-19 World Cup for the first time.

Player	Date of birth	Batting	Bowling style
Matthew Street (c, wk)	17 December 1978 (aged 19)	Right	—
Gulam Bodi	4 January 1979 (aged 19)	Left	Slow left-arm wrist-spin
Riaan vd Merwe	14 August 1978 (aged 19)	Right	Right-arm fast
Grant Elliott	21 March 1979 (aged 18)	Right	Right-arm medium
Andrew Gait	19 December 1978 (aged 19)	Right	—
Donovan Henry	20 September 1978 (aged 19)	Right	Right-arm fast-medium
Jon Kent	7 May 1979 (aged 18)	Right	Right-arm medium-fast
Michael Lumb	12 February 1980 (aged 17)	Left	Right-arm medium
Victor Mpitsang	28 March 1980 (aged 17)	Right	Right-arm fast-medium
Johann Myburgh	22 October 1980 (aged 17)	Right	Right-arm off-spin
Robin Peterson	4 August 1979 (aged 18)	Left	Left-arm orthodox
Jacques Rudolph	4 May 1981 (aged 16)	Left	Right-arm leg-spin
Wasfie Samsodien	24 September 1978 (aged 19)	Right	Right-arm medium-fast
Morne van Wyk (wk)	20 March 1979 (aged 18)	Right	Left-arm orthodox

== Group D ==
=== Bangladesh ===
Seven members of the Bangladeshi squad went on to play for the Bangladesh senior team. (Note: Does not include, if relevant, players who played in games without Test, ODI or iT20 status.) Source: ESPNcricinfo

Player	Date of birth	Batting	Bowling style
Sabbir Khan (c)	30 January 1978 (aged 19)	Right	Right-arm off-spin
Ahsanullah Hasan	15 October 1979 (aged 18)	Left	Left-arm orthodox
Al Sahariar	23 April 1978 (aged 19)	Right	Right-arm leg-spin
Ehsanul Haque	1 December 1979 (aged 18)	Right	Right-arm off-spin
Fahim Muntasir	1 November 1980 (aged 17)	Right	Right-arm off-spin
Golam Mortaza (wk)	23 May 1980 (aged 17)	Right	—
Hannan Sarkar	1 December 1982 (aged 15)	Right	Right-arm medium
Manjurul Islam	7 November 1979 (aged 18)	Left	Left-arm fast-medium
Mehrab Hossain	22 September 1978 (aged 19)	Right	Right-arm medium
Mushfiqur Rahman	10 January 1977 (aged 21)	Right	Right-arm fast-medium
Sajal Chowdhury	23 March 1978 (aged 19)	Right	Right-arm medium-fast
Shahnawaz Kabir	31 December 1978 (aged 19)	Right	Right-arm medium
Tanvirul Islam	1 September 1979 (aged 18)	Right	Right-arm leg-spin

=== England ===
Five members of the England squad went on to play for the England senior team. Source: ESPNcricinfo

Player	Date of birth	Batting	Bowling style
Owais Shah (c)	22 October 1978 (aged 19)	Right	Right-arm off-spin
Ian Flanagan	5 June 1980 (aged 17)	Left	Right-arm off-spin
Paul Franks	3 February 1979 (aged 18)	Left	Right-arm fast-medium
Michael Gough	18 December 1979 (aged 18)	Right	Right-arm off-spin
Jamie Grove	3 July 1979 (aged 18)	Right	Right-arm fast-medium
Giles Haywood	8 September 1979 (aged 18)	Left	Right-arm medium
Rob Key	12 May 1979 (aged 18)	Right	Right-arm off-spin
Richard Logan	28 January 1980 (aged 17)	Right	Right-arm medium-fast
Graham Napier	6 January 1980 (aged 18)	Right	Right-arm medium
Stephen Peters	10 December 1978 (aged 19)	Right	—
Jonathan Powell	13 June 1979 (aged 18)	Right	Right-arm off-spin
Chris Schofield	6 October 1978 (aged 19)	Left	Right-arm leg-spin
Graeme Swann	24 March 1979 (aged 18)	Right	Right-arm off-spin
Nicholas Wilton (wk)	23 September 1978 (aged 19)	Right	—

=== Namibia ===
Source: Namibia ESPNcricinfo

Player	Date of birth	Batting	Bowling style
Duane Viljoen (c)	—	—
Pieter Burger	—	—	—
Gareth Cloete	13 October 1978 (aged 19)	—	—
Shawn Gericke	6 August 1981 (aged 16)	Right	Right-arm medium
Bjorn Kotze	11 December 1978 (aged 19)	Right	Right-arm fast-medium
Benjamin Myburgh	5 March 1980 (aged 17)	Right	Left-arm orthodox
Gustav Pickering	—	—	—
Wally Rautenbach	—	—	—
Pieter Rossouw	19 June 1980 (aged 17)	Right	Right-arm medium-fast
Rudi Scholtz	23 February 1979 (aged 18)	Right	Right-arm fast-medium
Wilbur Slabber	2 December 1980 (aged 17)	Right	Right-arm off-spin
Stephan Swanepoel (wk)	2 December 1981 (aged 16)	Right	—
Johannes van der Merwe	5 February 1980 (aged 17)	Right	Right-arm off-spin
Riaan Walters	10 August 1980 (aged 17)	Right	—

=== New Zealand ===
Nine members of the New Zealand squad went on to play for the New Zealand senior team. Source: ESPNcricinfo

Player	Date of birth	Batting	Bowling style
Jarrod Englefield (c)	18 December 1979 (aged 18)	Right	—
Tim Anderson	13 December 1978 (aged 19)	Right	Right-arm leg-spin
James Franklin	7 November 1980 (aged 17)	Left	Left-arm medium-fast
Richard Harkness	1979 (aged 18 or 19)	—	—
Michael Hendry	15 October 1979 (aged 18)	Right	Right-arm medium
Peter Ingram	25 October 1978 (aged 19)	Right	Right-arm off-spin
David Kelly	29 March 1979 (aged 18)	Right	—
Hamish Marshall	15 February 1979 (aged 18)	Right	Right-arm medium
James Marshall	15 February 1979 (aged 18)	Right	Right-arm medium
Bruce Martin	25 April 1980 (aged 17)	Right	Left-arm orthodox
Peter McGlashan (wk)	22 June 1979 (aged 18)	Right	—
Kyle Mills	15 March 1979 (aged 18)	Right	Right-arm fast-medium
Lou Vincent	11 November 1978 (aged 19)	Right	Right-arm medium
Regan West	27 April 1979 (aged 18)	Left	Left-arm orthodox

== Sources ==
- Averages by team, MTN Under-19s World Cup 1997/98 – CricketArchive
- Records / ICC Under-19 World Cup, 1997/98 / Tournament statistics – ESPNcricinfo
