= List of Namibian first-class cricketers =

This is a list in alphabetical order of Namibian cricketers who have played first-class cricket. Prior to 1915, what is today Namibia was German South West Africa, a German colony. Cricket was recorded as being played in German South West Africa prior to the First World War, and later during the war by occupying South African troops. When the former colony was incorporated into South Africa following the war, cricket grew in popularity. What was the Territory of South West Africa gained independence from South Africa in 1990, with a Namibian cricket team having been formed in 1989. The national team first played first-class cricket in the 2004 Intercontinental Cup against Uganda at Windhoek. In the 2006-07 South African cricket season, Namibia were added to the CSA 3-Day Cup, the second tier of first-class cricket in South Africa; this arrangement lasted until 2018, when Namibia withdrew citing issues around costs and logistics. The team continued to play first-class cricket in the Intercontinental Cup until its discontinuation of the Intercontinental Cup in 2017. Namibia played a total of 155 first-class matches between 2004 and 2018.

The details are the player's usual name followed by the years in which he was active as a first-class player and then his name is given as it would appear on modern match scorecards. Note that many players represented other first-class teams besides Namibia. Players are shown to the end of the 2021–22 season.

As of 6 February 2022

== A ==
- Stephanus Ackermann (2008/09–2011) : S. T. Ackermann
- Nasimabe Ambambi (2009–10) : N. E. Ambambi

== B ==
- Justin Baard (2013/14–2017/18) : J. Baard
- Stephen Baard (2009/10–2017/18) : S. J. Baard
- Karl Birkenstock (2016/17–2017/18) : K. J. Birkenstock
- Dawid Botha (2006–2007/08) : D. H. Botha
- Kobus Brand (2011/12) : J. J. Brand
- Jean Bredenkamp (2010/11–2018/19) : J. M. Bredenkamp
- Ruhann Burden (2006/07) : R. Burden
- Bernie Burger (2003/04–2011/12) : K. B. Burger
- Jan-Berry Burger (2004/05-2013/14) : J-B. Burger
- Louis Burger (2003/04–2010/11) : L. J. Burger
- Petrus Burger (2017/18) : P. Burger
- Sarel Burger (2003/04–2017/18) : S. F. Burger

== C ==
- Gareth Cloete (2007–08) : G. W. Cloete
- Vernon Cloete (2013/14–2014–15) : V. R. Cloete
- Fritz Coetzee (2016/17–2017–18) : F. Coetzee
- Christopher Coombe (2011/12–2017–18) : C. W. Coombe
- Norman Curry (1973–74) : N. O. Curry

== D ==
- Jason Davidson (2012/13–2013–14) : J. Davidson
- Niko Davin (2017–18) : N. Davin
- Kobus Delport (2011–12) : K. Delport
- Marius Delport (2013–2015–16) : M. P. Delport
- Gert Dippenaar (2011–12) : G. J. Dippenaar
- Michau du Preez (2013/14–2017–18) : M. D. du Preez
- Michael Durant (2007–08) : M. Durant

== E ==
- Andre Engelbrecht (2011–12) : E. Engelbrecht
- Gerhard Erasmus (2011–2017–18) : M. G. Erasmus

== F ==
- Jacques Fourie (2016–17) : J. Fourie
- Glenn Foxcroft (2010/11–2011–12) G. Foxcroft
- Jan Frylinck (2010/11-2015–16) : J. N. Frylinck

== G ==
- Hendrik Geldenhuys (2007/08–2012–13) : H. W. Geldenhuys
- Zane Green (2013/14–2017–18) : Z. E. Green
- Shalako Groenewald 2012/13–2013–14) : S. Groenewald
- Willem Groenewald (2009/10–2010–11) : W. J. Groenewald
- Zhivago Groenewald (2010/11–2016–17) : Z. Groenewald
- Pieter Grove (2007/08–2012–13) : P. J. Grove

== H ==
- Robert Herridge (2014/15–2015–16) : R. J. Herridge

== K ==
- Morné Karg (2005) : M. Karg
- Daniel Keulder (2003/04–2005) : D. Keulder
- Louis Klazinga (2006/07–2013–14)) : L. Klazinga
- Bjorn Kotze (2005–2010–11) : B. L. Kotze
- Jean-Pierre Kotze (2012/13–2017–18) : J–P. Kotze
- Malan Kruger (2014–15) : M. B. Kruger

== L ==
- Jan Nicol Loftie-Eaton (2017/18) : J. N. Loftie-Eaton
- Sybrand Loftie-Eaton (2013/14–2015/16) : S. J. Loftie-Eaton
- Gert Lotter (2010/11) : G. P. Lotter
- Andrew Louw (2008/09) : A. Louw
- Lennie Louw (1976/77–1981/82) : J. L. Louw
- Lo-handre Louwrens (2015/16–2017/18) : L. Louwrens
- Hugo Ludik (2004/05–2007/08) : H. Ludik
- Tangeni Lungameni (2015/16–2017/18) : T. Lungameni

== M ==
- Hendrik Marx (2008–09) : H. J. Marx
- Mika Mutumbe (2012/13–2016–17) : M. Mutumbe
- Wessel Myburgh (2009/10–2010–11) : W. Myburgh

== N ==
- Mauritius Ngupita (2017–18) : M. V. Ngupita

== O ==
- Ian Opperman (2011/12–2012–13) : I. Opperman

== P ==
- Colin Peake (2016/17–2017–18) : C. J. Peake
- Xander Pitchers (2012/13–2016–17) : R. A. H. Pitchers
- Henno Prinsloo (2006–2006–07) : H. Prinsloo

== R ==
- Wayne Raw (2012–13) : W. Raw
- Neil Rossouw (2004/05–2011–12) : N. Rossouw
- Pieter Rossouw (2009/10–2011–12) : P. Rossouw

== S ==
- Bernard Scholtz (2008/09–2017/18) : B. M. Scholtz
- Nicolaas Scholtz (2003/04–2017/18) : N. R. P. Scholtz
- Rudi Scholtz (2007/08) : R. Scholtz
- Ben Shikongo (2017/18) : B. Shikongo
- Sean Silver (2007/08) : S. Silver
- Wilbur Slabber (2007/08–2009/10) : W. Slabber
- Johannes Smit (2011/12–2017/18) : J. J. Smit
- Christiaan Snyman (2013/14–2017/18) : C. F. Snyman
- Gerrie Snyman (2003/04–2017/18) : G. Snyman
- Ewald Steenkamp (2007/08–2011/12) : E. Steenkamp
- Hermias Strauss (2013/14–2016/17) : H. Strauss
- Ricardo Strauss (2014/15–2015/16) : R. Strauss
- Stephan Swanepoel (2003/04–2008/09) : S. J. Swanepoel

== V ==
- Johannes van der Merwe (2003/04) : J. M. van der Merwe
- Lowaldo van der Merwe (2009/10) : L. van der Merwe
- Louis van der Westhuizen (2006–2017/18) L. P. van der Westhuizen
- Michael van Lingen (2015/16) : M. van Lingen
- Martin van Niekerk (2008/09) : I. M. van Niekerk
- Ashley van Rooi (2009/19) : A. van Rooi
- Burton van Rooi (2006/07) : B. O. van Rooi
- Danie van Schoor (2013/14–2017/18) : D. van Schoor
- Melt van Schoor (2003/04–2004/05) : M. van Schoor
- Raymond van Schoor (2007/08–2015/16) : R. van Schoor
- Wian van Vuuren (2009/10–2016/17) : W. van Vuuren
- Warren van Wyk (2015/16) : W. van Wyk
- Ian van Zyl (2005–2008/09) : M. C. van Zyl
- Gilliam Vermeulen (1985/86–1988/89) : G. J. Vermeulen
- Tobias Verwey (2005–2010/11) : T. Verwey
- Christi Viljoen (2009/10–2018/19) : C. Viljoen

== W ==
- Riaan Walters (2003/04–2008–09) : R. Walters
- Bredell Wessels (2011/12–2015–16) : J. B. Wessels
- David Wiese (2005/06–2020) : D. Wiese
- Craig Williams (2007/08–2017–18) : G. G. Williams

== Y ==
- Pikky Ya France (2010/11–2017–18) : H. N. Ya France
- Kenneth Yates (1961) : K. C. Yates
