= List of Tasmania List A cricket records =

The Tasmania cricket team's List A records.

== Team totals ==
=== Highest team totals ===
Rank	Runs	Opponent	Venue	Season
1	340/5	South Australia	Bellerive Oval, Hobart	2004/05
2	327/7	New South Wales	Bankstown Oval, Sydney	2001/02
3	311/8	Victoria	Melbourne Cricket Ground, Melbourne	2002/03
4	299/9	New South Wales	Bellerive Oval, Hobart	2005/06
5	298/5	Victoria	Bellerive Oval, Hobart	2004/05
Source: . Last updated: 28 June 2007.

=== Highest team totals against ===
Rank	Runs	Opponent	Venue	Season
1	397/4	New South Wales	Bankstown Oval, Sydney	2001/02
2	325/6	South Australia	TCA Ground, Hobart	1986/87
3	320/4	Queensland	Gabba, Brisbane	1993/94
4	311/7	New South Wales	Bellerive Oval, Hobart	2005/06
5	310/9	West Indies	NTCA Ground, Launceston	1975/76
Source: . Last updated: 28 June 2007.

=== Lowest team totals ===
Rank	Runs	Opponent	Venue	Season
1	77	England	NTCA Ground, Launceston	1978/79
2	80	New South Wales	Formby Recreation Ground, Devonport	1984/85
3	89	Queensland	Gabba, Brisbane	1984/85
4	91	Western Australia	Bellerive Oval, Hobart	1997/98
5				
Source: . Last updated: 28 June 2007.

=== Lowest team totals against ===
Rank	Runs	Opponent	Venue	Season
1	51	South Australia	Bellerive Oval, Hobart	2002/03
2				
3				
4				
5				
Source: . Last updated: 28 June 2007.

=== Greatest win margins (by runs) ===
Rank	Margin	Opponent	Venue	Season
1	179 runs	Matabeleland	Bulawayo Athletic Club, Bulawayo	1995/96
2	140 runs	South Australia	Bellerive Oval, Hobart	2002/03
3	115 runs	South Australia	Bellerive Oval, Hobart	1996/97
4	114 runs	South Australia	Bellerive Oval, Hobart	2004/05
=4	114 runs	Victoria	Junction Oval, Melbourne, Victoria	2005/06
Source: . Last updated: 28 June 2007.

== Individual records ==
=== Most matches played ===
Rank	Matches	Player	Period
1	91	Michael Di Venuto	1992/93 –
2	75	Jamie Cox	1988/89 – 2004/05
3	71	Daniel Marsh	1993/94 – 2006/07
4	64	Shaun Young	1991/92 – 2004
5	55	David Boon	1978/79 – 1998/99
Source: . Last updated: 28 June 2007.

=== Most catches (fielder) ===
Rank	Catches	Player	Matches
1	43	Michael Di Venuto	91
2	36	Daniel Marsh	71
3	23	Shaun Young	64
4	19	Jamie Cox	75
5	16	David Boon	55
Source: . Last updated: 28 June 2007.

=== Most dismissals ===
Rank	Dismissals	Player	Matches
1	50 (43c./7st.)	Mark Atkinson	35
2	42 (39c./3st.)	Sean Clingeleffer	40
3	17 (16c./1st.)	Roger Woolley	22
4	16 (15c./1st.)	Michael Dighton	38
5	9 (9c./0st.)	Richard Soule	11
Source: . Last updated: 28 June 2007.

== Batting records ==
=== Highest individual scores ===
Rank	Runs	Player	Opponent	Venue	Season
1	145	Travis Birt	South Australia	Bellerive Oval, Hobart	2004/05
2	129*	Michael Di Venuto	South Australia	Bellerive Oval, Hobart	1996/97
3	125	Michael Di Venuto	New South Wales	Bellerive Oval, Hobart	2003/04
4	124	Michael Di Venuto	South Australia	Adelaide Oval, Adelaide	2000/01
5	118	Michael Bevan	South Australia	Bellerive Oval, Hobart	2004/05
Source:. Last updated: 28 June 2007.

=== Most career runs ===
Rank	Runs	Player	Career
1	2,629 (89 inns.)	Michael Di Venuto	1991/92 –
2	1,879 (73 inns.)	Jamie Cox	1987/88 – 2005/06
3	1,725 (52 inns.)	David Boon	1978/79 – 1998/99
4	1,687 (66 inns.)	Daniel Marsh	1993/94 – 2006/07
5	1,430 (56 inns.)	Shaun Young	1991/92 – 2001/02
Source: . Last updated: 28 June 2007.

=== Most runs in a season ===
Rank	Runs	Player	Average	Season
1				
2				
3				
4				
5				
Source: . Last updated: 28 June 2007.

=== Highest batting averages ===
Rank	Average	Player	Career
1	35.93 (52 inns.)	David Boon	1978/79 – 1998/99
2	33.13 (33 inns.)	Ricky Ponting	1992/93 –
3	32.06 (89 inns.)	Michael Di Venuto	1991/92 –
4	31.58 (46 inns.)	Dene Hills	1992/93 – 2001/02
5	31.51 (48 inns.)	Michael Dighton	1997/98 –
Qualification: 20 innings. Source: . Last updated: 28 June 2007.

=== Most centuries ===
Rank	Centuries	Player	Matches
1	5	Michael Di Venuto	91
2	3	Daniel Marsh	71
3	1	Travis Birt	20
=3	1	David Boon	55
=3	1	Ricky Ponting	33
Source: . Last updated: 28 June 2007.

=== List A partnership records ===
Wicket	Runs	Batsmen	Opponent	Venue	Season
1	210	Jamie Cox & David Boon	New South Wales	Bellerive Oval, Hobart	1998/99
2	225	Travis Birt & Michael Bevan	South Australia	Bellerive Oval, Hobart	2004/05
3	152	Gary Goodman & John Hampshire	Queensland	Gabba, Brisbane	1978/79
4	125	Travis Birt & George Bailey	Queensland	Bellerive Oval, Hobart	2006/07
5	158	Jamie Cox & Daniel Marsh	Queensland	Bellerive Oval, Hobart	2002/03
6	100	Michael Bevan & Tim Paine	Queensland	Bellerive Oval, Hobart	2005/06
7	96*	Trevor Docking & Jack Simmons	Western Australia	TCA Ground, Hobart	1978/79
8	58	Jamie Cox & Scott Kremerskothen	New South Wales	Formby Recreation Ground, Devonport	2002/03
9	67	Graeme Cunningham & David Saker	Western Australia	WACA, Perth	2001/02
=10	28	Michael Farrell & Mark Ridgway	Western Australia	Bellerive Oval, Hobart	1996/97
=10	28	Sean Clingeleffer & Shannon Tubb	South Australia	Adelaide Oval, Adelaide	2001/02
Source: . Last updated: 29 June 2007.

== Bowling records ==
=== Most career wickets ===
Rank	Wickets	Player	Matches	Average
1	63	Damien Wright	53	28.80
2	48	Adam Griffith	38	32.58
3	43	Shaun Young	64	33.33
4	40	Brett Geeves	30	28.42
=4	40	Daniel Marsh	71	40.60
Source: . Last updated: 28 June 2007.

=== Most wickets in a season ===
Rank	Wickets	Player	Matches	Season
1				
2				
3				
4				
5				
Source: . Last updated: 28 June 2007.

=== Best career average ===
Rank	Average	Player	Overs	Wickets
1	28.42	Brett Geeves	235.4	40
2	28.80	Damien Wright	471.5	63
3	31.00	Mark Ridgway	195	28
4	32.58	Adam Griffith	336.5	48
5	32.77	Michael Farrell	204	27
Qualification: 2000 balls bowled. Source: . Last updated: 28 June 2007.

=== Best figures in an innings ===
Rank	Figures	Player	Opponent	Venue	Season
1	5/15	Rod McCurdy	India	NTCA Ground, Launceston	1980/81
2	5/23	Josh Marquet	Queensland	Bellerive Oval, Hobart	1995/96
3	5/27	Paul Hutchison	South Australia	Bellerive Oval, Hobart	1996/97
4	5/29	Mark Hill	Queensland	Gabba, Brisbane	1985/86
5	5/45	Brett Geeves	Victoria	Junction Oval, Melbourne	2004/05
Source: . Last updated: 28 June 2007.
