= 1985–86 Australian Tri-Series =

International cricket tournament

1985–86 World Series
- Date: 9 January – 9 February 1986
- Location: Australia
- Result: Won by Australia; 2–0 in final series
Teams
Australia	India	New Zealand
Captains
Allan Border	Kapil Dev	Jeremy Coney
Most runs
David Boon (418)	Sunil Gavaskar (385)	Martin Crowe (330)
Most wickets
Simon Davis (18)	Kapil Dev (20)	Richard Hadlee (15)

The 1985–86 Benson & Hedges World Series was a One Day International (ODI) cricket tri-series where Australia played host to India and New Zealand. Australia and India reached the Finals, which Australia won 2–0.

== Points table ==
Team	P	W	L	T	NR	Pts	RR
Australia	10	6	3	0	1	13	4.033
India	10	5	5	0	0	10	4.092
New Zealand	10	3	6	0	1	7	3.862

== Uniforms ==
Australia
Australia kit

India
India kit

New Zealand
New Zealand kit

== Result summary ==
9 January 1986 (D/N)
Scorecard

New Zealand; 161/7 (29 overs)	v	Australia
Martin Crowe 71 (57); Simon Davis 2/30 (6 overs)

No result
Melbourne Cricket Ground, Melbourne
Umpires: Tony Crafter (Aus) and Raymond Isherwood (Aus)

- Australia won the toss and elected to field.
- The match was reduced to 29 overs each due to rain
- Steve Waugh, Bruce Reid, Dave Gilbert, Simon Davis and Ervin McSweeney made their ODI debuts for Australia

11 January 1986
Scorecard

New Zealand; 259/9 (50 overs)	v	India; 263/5 (48 overs)
Martin Crowe 76 (83); Roger Binny 2/29 (6 overs)		Mohinder Amarnath 61 (73); Stu Gillespie 1/39 (9 overs)

India won by 5 wickets
The Gabba, Brisbane
Umpires: Bruce Martin (Aus) and Mel Johnson (Aus)
Player of the match: Kapil Dev

- India won the toss and elected to field.
- Shivlal Yadav made his ODI debut for India. Stu Gillespie made his ODI debut for New Zealand

12 January 1986
Scorecard

India; 161 (43 overs)	v	Australia; 164/6 (45.2 overs)
Mohammad Azharuddin 35 (57); Craig McDermott 2/32 (9 overs)		Greg Matthews 46 (77); Roger Binny 3/38 (10 overs)

Australia won by 4 wickets
The Gabba, Brisbane
Umpires: Dick French (Aus) and Steve Randell (Aus)
Player of the match: Greg Matthews

- Australia won the toss and elected to field.

14 January 1986 (D/N)
Scorecard

New Zealand; 152 (49.2 overs)	v	Australia; 153/6 (45.1 overs)
Jeremy Coney 58 (86); Dave Gilbert 5/46 (10 overs)		Greg Ritchie 68 (92); Ewen Chatfield 3/21 (10 overs)

Australia won by 4 wickets
Sydney Cricket Ground, Sydney
Umpires: Bruce Martin (Aus) and Steve Randell (Aus)
Player of the match: Dave Gilbert

- Australia won the toss and elected to field.
- Geoff Marsh made his ODI debut for Australia

16 January 1986 (D/N)
Scorecard

Australia; 161 (44.2 overs)	v	India; 162/2 (40.2 overs)
Steve Waugh 73* (104); Chetan Sharma 2/29 (9 overs)		Sunil Gavaskar 59 (99); Bruce Reid 1/39 (9 overs)

India won by 8 wickets
Melbourne Cricket Ground, Melbourne
Umpires: Steve Randell (Aus) and Mel Johnson (Aus)
Player of the match: Steve Waugh

- India won the toss and elected to field.

18 January 1986
Scorecard

India; 113 (44.2 overs)	v	New Zealand; 115/7 (40.2 overs)
Mohinder Amarnath 30 (71); Martin Snedden 3/23 (8 overs)		Martin Crowe 33 (58); Kapil Dev 3/26 (10 overs)

New Zealand won by 3 wickets
WACA Ground, Perth
Umpires: Peter McConnell (Aus) and Ray Isherwood (Aus)
Player of the match: Martin Crowe

- New Zealand won the toss and elected to field.

19 January 1986
Scorecard

New Zealand; 159/6 (44.2 overs)	v	Australia; 161/6 (45.1 overs)
Jeff Crowe 63 (99); Steve Waugh 2/28 (10 overs)		Allan Border 58 (104); Richard Hadlee 2/35 (9.1 overs)

Australia won by 4 wickets
WACA Ground, Perth
Umpires: Dick French (Aus) and Steve Randell (Aus)
Player of the match: Allan Border

- Australia won the toss and elected to field.
- Glenn Trimble made his ODI debut for Australia

21 January 1986 (D/N)
Scorecard

Australia; 292/6 (50 overs)	v	India; 192/4 (50 overs)
Geoff Marsh 125 (145); Chetan Sharma 3/61 (9 overs)		Sunil Gavaskar 92 (144); Dave Gilbert 2/36 (10 overs)

Australia won by 100 runs
Sydney Cricket Ground, Sydney
Umpires: Peter McConnell (Aus) and Mel Johnson (Aus)
Player of the match: Geoff Marsh

- Australia won the toss and elected to field.

23 January 1986 (D/N)
Scorecard

India; 238/8 (50 overs)	v	New Zealand; 239/5 (50 overs)
Mohinder Amarnath 74 (101); Ewen Chatfield 4/28 (10 overs)		Martin Crowe 67 (93); Kapil Dev 2/36 (10 overs)

New Zealand won by 5 wickets
Melbourne Cricket Ground, Melbourne
Umpires: Bruce Martin (Aus) and Peter McConnell (Aus)
Player of the match: Martin Crowe

- New Zealand won the toss and elected to field.

25 January 1986
Scorecard

New Zealand; 172 (49.2 overs)	v	India; 174/5 (46 overs)
Richard Hadlee 71 (68); Roger Binny 2/13 (7 overs)		Mohammad Azharuddin 69 (90); Stu Gillespie 4/30 (10 overs)

India won by 5 wickets
Adelaide Oval, Adelaide
Umpires: Tony Crafter (Aus) and Dick French (Aus)
Player of the match: Mohammad Azharuddin

- India won the toss and elected to field.

26 January 1986
Scorecard

Australia; 262/8 (50 overs)	v	India; 226 (45.3 overs)
Steve Waugh 81 (75); Chetan Sharma 3/60 (10 overs)		Sunil Gavaskar 77 (110); Bruce Reid 5/53 (10 overs)

Australia won by 36 runs
Adelaide Oval, Adelaide
Umpires: Peter McConnell (Aus) and Ray Isherwood (Aus)
Player of the match: Bruce Reid

- India won the toss and elected to field.

27 January 1986
Scorecard

New Zealand; 276/7 (50 overs)	v	Australia; 70 (26.3 overs)
Bruce Edgar 61 (84); Bruce Reid 3/41 (10 overs)		Wayne Philips 22 (38); Richard Hadlee 3/14 (5 overs)

New Zealand won by 206 runs
Adelaide Oval, Adelaide
Umpires: Bruce Martin (Aus) and Tony Crafter (Aus)
Player of the match: Richard Hadlee

- New Zealand won the toss and elected to bat.

29 January 1986 (D/N)
Scorecard

Australia; 239/7 (50 overs)	v	New Zealand; 140 (42.4 overs)
David Boon 64 (95); Richard Hadlee 2/36 (10 overs)		Richard Hadlee 30 (37); Simon Davis 3/25 (9.4 overs)

Australia won by 99 runs
Sydney Cricket Ground, Sydney
Umpires: Dick French (Aus) and Ray Isherwood (Aus)
Player of the match: David Boon

- Australia won the toss and elected to bat.

31 January 1986 (D/N)
Scorecard

Australia; 235/7 (50 overs)	v	India; 238/4 (48.5 overs)
David Boon 76 (102); Kapil Dev 4/30 (9 overs)		Dilip Vengsarkar 77 (88); Simon Davis 2/34 (10 overs)

India won by 6 wickets
Melbourne Cricket Ground, Melbourne
Umpires: Tony Crafter (Aus) and Mel Johnson (Aus)
Player of the match: Dilip Vengsarkar

- Australia won the toss and elected to bat.

2 February 1986
Scorecard

India; 202/9 (48 overs)	v	New Zealand; 168/9 (45 overs) (Revised target 190 runs from 45 overs)
Chetan Sharma 38 (37); Stu Gillespie 3/54 (9 overs)		Jeremy Coney 37 (61); Kapil Dev 3/26 (9 overs)

India won by 22 runs
NTCA Ground, Launceston
Umpires: Tony Crafter (Aus) and Steve Randell (Aus)
Player of the match: Chetan Sharma

- New Zealand won the toss and elected to field.

== Final series ==
Australia won the best of three final series against India 2–0.

5 February 1986 (D/N)

Australia; 170/8 (44 overs)	v	India; 159 (43.4 overs)
David Boon 50 (92); Mohammad Azharuddin 2/26 (9 overs)		Dilip Vengsarkar 45 (81); Simon Davis 3/10 (7.4 overs)

Australia won by 11 runs
Sydney Cricket Ground, Sydney
Umpires: Dick French (Aus) and Mel Johnson (Aus)

- India won the toss and elected to field.
- Match reduced to 44 overs each due to rain
- Tim Zoehrer made his ODI debut for Australia

9 February 1986 (D/N)

India; 187 (44 overs)	v	Australia; 188/3 (47.2 overs)
Ravi Shastri 49 (52); Bruce Reid 2/37 (10 overs)		Allan Border 65 (67); Kapil Dev 2/26 (9 overs)

Australia won by 7 wickets
Melbourne Cricket Ground, Melbourne
Umpires: Dick French (Aus) and Mel Johnson (Aus)
Player of the match: Greg Matthews

- Australia won the toss and elected to field.
