= Cloete (surname) =

Cloete or Cloëté is a surname, and may refer to:

- Abraham Josias Cloëté (1794–1886), British Army officer
- Chris Cloete (born 1990), South African rugby player
- Francois Cloete, South African rugby player
- Gareth Cloete (born 1978), Namibian cricketer
- Hestrie Cloete (born 1978), South African high jumper
- Johan Cloete (born 1971), South African cricket umpire
- Patats Cloete (1873–1959), South African rugby player
- Rodney Cloete, Namibian politician
- Ruben Cloete (born 1982), South African football player
- Shane Cloete (born 1971), Zimbabwean cricketer
- Shirley Cloete (born 1982), Namibian football player
- Stuart Cloete (1897–1976), South African writer
- Tiaan Cloete (born 1989), South African cricketer
- William Broderick Cloete (1851–1915), British industrialist
