= Alexander Forrester =

Alexander Forrester may refer to:

- Alexander Forrester of Garden 16th-century Scottish landowner
- Alexander Forrester (minister) (1611–1686), Scottish minister
- Alexander Forrester (politician) (c.1711–1787), British barrister and politician
- Alexander Forrester (cricketer) (1899—1976), Scottish cricketer, administrator and educator

== See also ==
- Forrester (surname)
