= Niels Kopperholdt =

Danish cricketer (born 1979)

Personal information
- Full name: Niels Peter Kopperholdt
- Born: 17 June 1979 (age 47); Aalborg, North Jutland County, Denmark
- Batting: Right-handed
- Bowling: Right-arm fast-medium

International information
- National side: Denmark

Career statistics
Competition	List A
Matches	3
Runs scored	14
Batting average	–
100s/50s	–/–
Top score	12*
Balls bowled	138
Wickets	3
Bowling average	33.00
5 wickets in innings	–
10 wickets in match	–
Best bowling	3/45
Catches/stumpings	2/–
- Source: Cricinfo, 16 January 2011

Niels Peter Kopperholdt (born 17 June 1979) is a former Danish cricketer. Kopperholdt was a right-handed batsman who bowled right-arm fast-medium. He was born at Ålborg, North Jutland County.

Kopperholdt represented Denmark Under-19s in two youth One Day Internationals in the 1998 Under-19 World Cup, against Ireland Under-19s and Scotland Under-19s. He 2001, he was part of Denmark's squad for the 2001 ICC Trophy in Ireland, making his List A debut during the tournament against Ireland. He made two further List A appearances during the tournament, against the Netherlands and Namibia. He took 3 wickets in his three matches, at an average of 33.00, with best figures of 3/45. With the bat, he scored 14 runs, in three unbeaten innings, with a high score of 12 not out. In 2006, he played for Denmark in a friendly against the Netherlands, while the following year he toured England with the team, playing two friendly matches against the Gloucestershire Second XI. His last appearance for Denmark came in 2007, in a friendly against Bermuda.

He attended university at the University College of Northern Denmark, qualifying as an architect, a profession he currently works in for Friis & Moltke.
