= Romesh =

Romesh may refer to:

- Romesh Batra, Professor of Engineering Science and Mechanics at Virginia Polytechnic Institute and State University, Blacksburg, Virginia
- Romesh Bhandari (1928–2013), Indian Foreign Secretary, former Lieutenant Governor of Delhi, Andaman and Nicobar Islands, former governor of Tripura, Goa and Uttar Pradesh
- Romesh Chandra (1919–2016), Indian leader of the Communist Party of India (CPI)
- Romesh Chander Dogra, Indian politician from the state of Punjab
- Romesh Chunder Dutt CIE (1848–1909), Indian civil servant, economic historian, writer, and translator of Ramayana and Mahabharata
- Romesh Eranga (born 1985), Sri Lankan-born Canadian cricketer
- Romesh Fernando (born 1977), Sri Lankan former cricketer
- Romesh Gunesekera FRSL (born 1954), Sri Lankan-born British author, who was a finalist in the Man Booker Prize for his novel Reef in 1994
- Romesh Kaluwitharana (born 1969), former Sri Lankan cricketer
- Romesh Krishantha, Sri Lankan cricketer
- Romesh Chandra Mitra or Romesh Chunder Mitter (1840–1899), Indian judge and the first Indian officiating Chief Justice of the Calcutta High Court
- Romesh Ranganathan (born 1978), British stand-up comedian and actor
- Romesh Ratnesar (born 1975), Asian-American journalist and author
- Romesh Sharma (born 1947), Indian film producer, actor and director
- Romesh Thapar (1922–1987), left-wing Indian journalist and political commentator
- Romesh Wadhwani (born 1947), Indian-born American billionaire businessman; founder, chairman and CEO of Symphony Technology Group
- Romesh Weerawardane (born 1979), Sri Lankan chess player

== See also ==
- Judge Romesh, British comedy television show broadcast on Dave
- Rometsch, German metallurgical-coachbuilding company
- Ramesh
