= Majeed Jahangir =

Pakistani cricketer (born 1980)

Personal information
- Born: 3 December 1980 (age 45); Sialkot, Pakistan
- Source: Cricinfo, 3 April 2016

Majeed Jahangir (born 3 December 1980) is a Pakistani former cricketer. He played first-class cricket for several domestic teams, mainly Agriculture Development Bank of Pakistan, Sialkot and Gujranwala Cricket Association cricket teams, between 1998 and 2014. He was also a part of Pakistan's squad for the 1998 Under-19 Cricket World Cup.
