= Slabber =

Slabber is a surname. Notable people with the surname include:

- Jamie Slabber (born 1984), English footballer
- Wilbur Slabber (born 1980), Namibian cricketer
