= Mick Miller (cricketer) =

Australian cricketer (born 1979)

Personal information
- Full name: Michael Christian Miller
- Born: 30 May 1979 (age 47); Toowoomba, Queensland, Australia
- Source: Cricinfo, 3 April 2016

Michael Christian Miller (born 30 May 1979) is an Australian former cricketer. He played first-class cricket for Queensland and South Australia. He was also a part of Australia's squad for the 1998 Under-19 Cricket World Cup.
