= Craig Mackellar =

Scottish cricketer (born 1979)

Personal information
- Full name: Craig Colin Mackellar
- Born: 30 May 1979 (age 47); Edinburgh, Scotland
- Batting: Left-handed
- Bowling: Right-arm medium-fast

International information
- National side: Scotland (2000)
- Source: CricketArchive, 2 February 2016

Craig Colin Mackellar (born 30 May 1979) is a Scottish cricketer who played for the Scottish national side in 2000. He is a right-arm pace bowler.

Mackellar was born in Edinburgh. He represented the Scotland under-19s at the 1998 Under-19 World Cup, and played in three of his team's six matches, taking only a single wicket (against Kenya). Mackellar's senior debut for Scotland came in April 2000, at the ICC Six Nations Challenge in Zimbabwe. His best performance came against Denmark, where he took figures of 3/23 from nine overs. Outside of that tournament, Mackellar's only other game for Scotland came the following month, against Wiltshire in the 2000 NatWest Trophy.
