= Zaheer Khan (Pakistani cricketer) =

Pakistani cricketer (born 1979)

Personal information
- Born: 3 December 1979 (age 46); Lahore, Pakistan
- Source: Cricinfo, 3 April 2016

Zaheer Khan (born 3 December 1979) is a Pakistani former cricketer. He played first-class cricket for several domestic teams in Pakistan between 1998 and 2000. He was also a part of Pakistan's squad for the 1998 Under-19 Cricket World Cup.
