= Alan Duncan (disambiguation) =

Alan Duncan (born 1957) is a British Conservative Party politician.

Alan Duncan may also refer to:

- Alan Duncan (cricketer) (born 1980), Scottish cricketer
- Alan James Duncan (1938–1999), Scottish atomic physicist
- Alan S. Duncan (born 1965), British economist and econometrician

== See also ==
- Alan Gomme-Duncan (1893–1963), British Army officer
