= Euan Stubbs =

Scottish cricketer

Personal information
- Full name: Euan Graeme Crowther Stubbs
- Born: 23 April 1978 (age 48); Glasgow, Lanarkshire, Scotland
- Batting: Right-handed
- Role: Wicket-keeper

Domestic team information
- Years: Team
- 1999: Scotland

Career statistics
Competition	First-class
Matches	1
Runs scored	21
Batting average	–
100s/50s	–/–
Top score	14*
Catches/stumpings	3/–
- Source: Cricinfo, 2 November 2022

Euan Graeme Crowther Stubbs (born 23 April 1978) is a Scottish radiologist and former first-class cricketer.

Stubbs was born at Glasgow in April 1978. He was educated at The Glasgow Academy, before matriculating to the University of Edinburgh. A club cricketer for Watsonians, he was selected in the Scotland under-19 team for the 1998 Under-19 Cricket World Cup in South Africa, making six Youth One Day International appearances in the competition. The following year, he made a single first-class appearance for the senior Scottish team against Ireland at Belfast. Playing as a wicket-keeper in the side, he was twice unbeaten in the match with scores of 7 and 14, in addition to taking 3 catches behind the stumps. By 2010, Stubbs was acting captain at Watsonians, and the following year he took a one-year sabbatical from playing to spend a year in Canada on a medical fellowship at McMaster University. As of 2026, Stubbs is a practicing radiologist in Canada.
