= Pieter Rossouw =

Pieter Rossouw may refer to:

- Pieter Rossouw (cricketer) (born 1980), Namibian cricketer
- Pieter Rossouw (rugby union) (born 1971), South African rugby player and coach
