= Sanjaya Rodrigo =

Sri Lankan cricketer (born 1979)

Personal information
- Born: 27 February 1979 (age 47); Galle, Sri Lanka
- Source: Cricinfo, 3 April 2016

Sanjaya Rodrigo (born 27 February 1979) is a Sri Lankan former cricketer. He played first-class cricket for several domestic teams in Sri Lanka between 1998 and 2006. He was also a part of Sri Lanka's squad for the 1998 Under-19 Cricket World Cup.

He was the first batsman in a Twenty20 (T20) to carry his bat in any form of T20 cricket when he did so in 2005 in a domestic T20 match, where he was unbeaten on 16 in the team's total of just 85. To date he is the only Sri Lankan cricketer to carry his bat in a T20 match. His innings of 16 not out is also the lowest score by any batsman in T20 cricket when carrying his bat through the innings.
