= Okakundu =

Okakundu is a village in the Uukwaluudhi in the Tsandi Constituency in Omusati Region, Namibia. Cricketer Nasimabe Ambambi was born there.
