= The Glasgow Academy =

Coordinates: 55°52′33″N 4°16′46″W

Location
- Colebrooke Street; Glasgow, G12 8HE; Scotland

Information
- Type: Private day school
- Motto: Serva Fidem (Keep The Faith)
- Religious affiliation: Church of Scotland
- Established: 1845; 181 years ago
- Founders: Members of Free Church of Scotland
- Local authority: Glasgow City Council
- Chair: Jane Gotts
- Rector: Matt Gibson
- Gender: Mixed
- Age: 3 to 18
- Enrolment: 1680
- Houses: Arthur; Fraser; Morrison; Temple
- Charity Number: SCO 15638
- Campuses: Kelvinbridge, Milngavie & Newlands
- Website: www.theglasgowacademy.org.uk

The Glasgow Academy is a private coeducational day school for pupils aged 3–18 in Glasgow, Scotland.

It is one of the top performing independent schools in Scotland for SQA Higher Results in 2025.

Founded in 1845, it is the oldest continuously fully independent school in Glasgow, Scotland. In 1991, The Glasgow Academy merged with Westbourne School for Girls, adopting the distinctive purple of its uniform in the school badge and tartan. It is located in the Kelvinbridge area and has approximately 1680 pupils, split between three preparatory school sites and senior school.

The current Rector is Dr Matt Gibson, who has held the position since January 2025.

== History ==
In May 1845, William Campbell of Tullichewan convened a meeting in the Star Hotel in George Square with Free Church ministers to discuss establishing "an Academic Institution in the City". As a result of this meeting, The Glasgow Academy was formed.

The Scottish Rugby Union was founded on Monday 3 March 1873 at a meeting held at The Glasgow Academy.

The school war memorial was designed by former pupil Alexander Nisbet Paterson in 1922.

In 1981 the school admitted girl pupils for the first time.

In 1991, Glasgow Academy merged with Westbourne School for Girls, adopting the distinctive purple of its uniform in the school badge and tartan. It is in Kelvinbridge and has approximately 1350 pupils, split between three preparatory school sites and a senior school.

The Glasgow Academy's preparatory school is the first school in the UK to have been awarded the Diana Gold Award for Anti-Bullying.

In 2024, The Glasgow Academy was awarded the Employer Recognition Scheme Gold Award by the Ministry of Defence.

The current rector is Matt Gibson, who has held the position since 2025.

HMIe last inspected the school in November 2008.

== Notable alumni ==
- Frederick Anderson, Chairman, Municipal Council, Shanghai International Settlement, 1905–06.
- John Arthur, Church of Scotland missionary to East Africa.
- J. M. Barrie, writer of Peter Pan
- Laura Bartlett, British hockey international and Olympic athlete
- John Beattie (rugby union), rugby union player for Scotland and British Lions
- James Bridie, playwright, screenwriter and physician
- Jack Buchanan, actor, singer & dancer
- Sir James Caird (1864–1954), founder of the National Maritime Museum.
- Sir David Young Cameron (1865–1945), Scottish painter and etcher.
- John Traill Cargill, Chairman of Burmah Oil Company, 1904–1943
- Jackson Carlaw, Scottish Conservative Party MSP
- Horatio Scott Carslaw (1870–1954), Professor of Pure and Applied Mathematics at the University of Sydney.
- Archibald Corbett, 1st Baron Rowallan, politician and philanthropist.
- Douglas Crawford, Scottish National Party MP
- Pippa Crerar, Political Editor of the Daily Mirror
- Darius Campbell (born Danesh), singer-songwriter & actor
- Donald Dewar, Scottish Labour Party MP and MSP, first First Minister of Scotland
- Ronald Drever, Professor of Physics at Caltech and part of the team that first detected gravitational waves
- Andrew Dunlop, Baron Dunlop, Conservative peer
- Walter Elliot, Scottish Unionist Party MP, Secretary of State for Scotland
- Niall Ferguson, Professor of History at Harvard University
- Alexander Forrester, cricketer and cricket administrator
- George MacDonald Fraser, author
- John Gardner (law), Professor of Jurisprudence, University of Oxford
- Thomas Dunlop Galbraith, 1st Baron Strathclyde, Scottish Unionist Party MP
- Group Captain Sir Louis Leisler Greig, KBE, CVO British naval surgeon, and intimate of King George VI (1880–1953)
- Sir Angus Grossart, Chairman and executive director of merchant bank Noble Grossart
- Rev. Dr Andrew Harper, Scottish–Australian Biblical scholar and Principal of the Presbyterian Ladies' College, Melbourne and St Andrew's College, Sydney (also attended Scotch College, Melbourne)
- Sir Michael Hirst, Scottish Conservative and Unionist Party MP and chairman
- Sir William Wilson Hunter, KCSI CIE (1840–1900)
- Andrew Innes, cricketer
- Jeremy Isaacs, founder of Channel 4
- William Paton Ker, literary critic
- John Kerr, Baron Kerr of Kinlochard, diplomat and crossbench life peer
- Alexander Dunlop Lindsay, 1st Baron Lindsay of Birker, philosopher
- Maurice Lindsay CBE Scottish broadcaster, writer and poet (1918–2009).
- Sir James Lithgow, shipbuilder and industrialist; 1883–1952
- Neil MacGregor, Director of the British Museum
- Robert Maclennan, Baron Maclennan of Rogart, leader of the Social Democratic Party and the Liberal Democrats
- Alan MacNaughtan, actor
- Guy McCrone, author and founding member of the Glasgow Citizens Theatre
- George Matheson theologian and preacher (1842–1906)
- Jim Mollison pioneer aviator (1905–1959)
- W. H. Murray, mountaineer, explorer and writer
- Robin Nisbet (1925–2013), professor of Latin literature
- David Omand Knight Grand Cross of the Order of the Bath, former senior British civil servant, visiting professor at King's College London
- Alexander Pollock, Scottish Conservative and Unionist Party MP, sheriff
- William Ramsay, Nobel laureate (Chemistry 1904), discovered the gas 'Argon'
- John Reith, 1st Baron Reith, founder of the BBC
- Albert Russell, Scottish Unionist Party MP, Solicitor General for Scotland
- James Scott, obstetrician and gynaecologist
- William Sharp, poet and literary biographer
- Chris Simmers, professional rugby union player and Scotland rugby league international
- Ninian Smart, scholar of religion
- Norman Stone, historian
- Euan Stubbs, cricketer
- Iain Vallance, Baron Vallance of Tummel, ex-Chief Executive of BT, Liberal Democrat politician
- Herbert Waddell Scottish rugby internationalist and president of the Barbarians (1902–1988)
- William Walker, cricketer, cricket administrator, and British Army officer
- Sir James Wordie, polar explorer and geologist

== Notable alumnae of Westbourne School for Girls ==
- Vivien Heilbron, actress
- Fiona Kennedy, singer, actress and broadcaster
- Kate Mavor, CEO of English Heritage
- Jacqueline Lee, Chair, Association for Heritage Interpretation, Founder Artemis Scotland.

== Bibliography ==
MacLeod, Iain M., The Glasgow Academy 150 Years, (The Glasgow Academicals' War Memorial Trust, 1997)
