= Soweto Cricket Oval =

Multi-purpose stadium in Soweto, Gauteng, South Africa

- Interactive map of Soweto Cricket Oval
- Former names: Elkah Cricket Stadium, Morocco End, School End
- Location: Soweto, Gauteng
- Coordinates: 26°15′54″S 27°52′02.5″E
- Capacity: 8,000

Construction
- Groundbreaking: 1973
- Opened: 1973
- Architect: Noero Architects

Tenants
- Soweto cricket team Gauteng cricket team (occasional); South Africa national cricket team (occasional)

Website
- Cricinfo

Soweto Cricket Oval is a multi-purpose stadium in Soweto, Gauteng. The ground is mainly used for organizing matches of cricket, although it has also been used occasionally for football and local events. The stadium hosted its only first-class match on 27 October 1995, where South Africa and England played to a draw. It has also hosted two List A matches, and was used as one of the venues during the 1998 Under-19 World Cup.

It has hosted local events such as the Hugh Masekela Heritage Festival.
