= Rajashekar Shanbal =

Indian cricketer (born 1978)

Personal information
- Born: 1 September 1978 (age 48); Hubli, India
- Source: ESPNcricinfo, 12 December 2016

Rajashekar Shanbal (born 1 September 1978) is an Indian cricketer. He played four first-class and three List A matches between 2001 and 2005. He was also part of India's squad for the 1998 Under-19 Cricket World Cup.
