= Donovan Henry =

South African cricketer (born 1978)

Personal information
- Born: 20 September 1978 (age 48); Cape Town, South Africa
- Source: ESPNcricinfo, 12 December 2016

Donovan Henry (born 20 September 1978) is a South African cricketer. He played one first-class match in 1997/98. He was also part of South Africa's squad for the 1998 Under-19 Cricket World Cup.
