= Abeed Janmohamed =

Kenyan cricketer (born 1978)

Personal information
- Full name: Abeed Mahmud Tajdin Janmohamed
- Born: 10 December 1978 (age 47); Mombasa, Kenya
- Batting: Right-handed
- Bowling: Right-arm medium
- Role: Occasional wicket-keeper

International information
- National side: Kenya

Domestic team information
- Years: Team
- 2000: Oxford Universities
- 2004: Kenya

Career statistics
Competition	First-class
Matches	5
Runs scored	35
Batting average	7.00
100s/50s	–/–
Top score	18
Balls bowled	36
Wickets	–
Bowling average	–
5 wickets in innings	–
10 wickets in match	–
Best bowling	–
Catches/stumpings	6/1
- Source: CricketArchive, 16 October 2011

Abeed Mahmud Tajdin Janmohamed (born 10 December 1978, in Mombasa) is a Kenyan former cricketer. A right-handed batsman he usually took on the role of wicket-keeper.

Janmohamed represented his country at Under-19 level at the 1998 Cricket World Cup, scoring 219 runs at the tournament. He would play for the senior team twice during the 2004 ICC Intercontinental Cup following a boycott by several players, his late call-up meant he only flew into Nairobi from London on the morning of the match against Namibia.

Educated at Cranleigh School in Surrey, Janmohamed also played first-class cricket for Oxford Universities, featuring in three matches against county teams in 2000.

Janmohamed graduated from Oxford Brookes University in 2002 with a degree in business management, before going on to work in commercial roles at Cricinfo and ESPN. He joined the Trustee board of the Lord's Taverners in 2021.
