= Sathiamoorty Saravanan =

Indian cricketer (born 1978)

Personal information
- Born: 22 September 1978 (age 48); Namakkal, India
- Source: ESPNcricinfo, 12 December 2016

Sathiamoorty Saravanan (born 22 September 1978) is an Indian cricketer. He played 46 first-class and 44 List A matches between 1997 and 2011. He was also part of India's squad for the 1998 Under-19 Cricket World Cup.
