= Stu Gillespie =

New Zealand cricketer

Personal information
- Full name: Stuart Ross Gillespie
- Born: 2 March 1957 (age 69); Wanganui, New Zealand
- Batting: Right-handed
- Bowling: Right-arm fast-medium

International information
- National side: New Zealand (1985–1988)
- Only Test (cap 157): 21 February 1986 v Australia
- ODI debut (cap 52): 11 January 1986 v India
- Last ODI: 20 January 1988 v Australia

Domestic team information
- Years: Team
- 1979/80–1982/83: Northern Districts
- 1981–1987: Northumberland
- 1984/85–1988/89: Auckland

Career statistics
| Competition | Test | ODI | FC | LA |
|---|---|---|---|---|
| Matches | 1 | 19 | 36 | 61 |
| Runs scored | 28 | 70 | 599 | 325 |
| Batting average | 28.00 | 11.66 | 14.97 | 10.83 |
| 100s/50s | 0/0 | 0/0 | 0/3 | 0/9 |
| Top score | 28 | 18* | 73 | 25 |
| Balls bowled | 162 | 963 | 6,283 | 1,983 |
| Wickets | 1 | 23 | 99 | 77 |
| Bowling average | 79.00 | 32.00 | 27.16 | 25.75 |
| 5 wickets in innings | 0 | 0 | 3 | 0 |
| 10 wickets in match | 0 | 0 | 0 | 0 |
| Best bowling | 1/79 | 4/30 | 5/30 | 4/30 |
| Catches/stumpings | 0/– | 7/– | 18/– | 19/– |
- Source: Cricinfo, 4 February 2017

Stuart Ross Gillespie (born 2 March 1957) is a former New Zealand cricketer who played one Test match and 19 One Day Internationals for the New Zealand national cricket team in the 1980s.

== Cricket career ==
Gillespie was a specialist seam bowler. He took 13 wickets in the 1985–86 One Day International World Series Cup in Australia. The New Zealand team's manager, Glenn Turner, praised his contribution, saying Gillespie "gave everything he had" and "did all that was asked of him".

Later that season, in New Zealand, Gillespie was selected for First Test against Australia, although he had only played two first class games in the preceding two seasons. He took one wicket and made 28 in his only Test innings, batting as nightwatchman. It was his only Test match. He took three wickets at a bowling average just above 60 in the one-day home series that followed. He missed the 1987 World Cup, but returned for the World Series Cup following the tournament, where he played all eight group stage matches and took seven wickets before he was replaced by Richard Hadlee for the final series.

Gillespie's best first-class bowling figures were 5 for 30 (match figures of 38–14–69–8) against Auckland in 1979–80, his first season, when he took 45 first-class wickets at an average of 22.17. His best List A figures were 4 for 30 for New Zealand against India at the Adelaide Oval in January 1986.

Gillespie later served as coach of Wanganui and as chairman of Cricket Wanganui.
