= Neil Millar =

Scottish cricketer

Personal information
- Born: 3 February 1981 (age 45); Battersea, Greater London, England
- Batting: Right-handed
- Bowling: Right-arm medium

Domestic team information
- Years: Team
- 2000–2003: Oxford University
- Source: CricketArchive, 2 February 2016

Neil Millar (born 3 February 1981) is a former Scottish cricketer who played first-class cricket for Oxford University. He played as a right-handed middle-order batsman.

== Life ==
Millar was born in England, but was educated in Scotland, at Fettes College. He played for the Scottish under-19 team at the 1998 Under-19 World Cup in South Africa, featuring in all six of his team's games. Millar scored 163 runs at the tournament (behind only Greig Butchart for Scotland), which included an innings of 72 against Denmark.

Having gone on to Christ Church, Oxford, Millar made his first-class debut for Oxford University in June 2000, against Northamptonshire. The following month, he played for the first time in the annual University Match against Cambridge University, held at Lord's. In the 2001 edition of the game, which was hosted by Cambridge, Millar was named Oxford's captain, subsequently leading his side to a three-wicket win. He was replaced as captain by Jamie Dalrymple in 2002, but did score a maiden first-class fifty, making 51 runs from 177 balls to help bat out the game. In the 2003 fixture, which was his last at first-class level, Millar scored his one and only first-class century, an innings of 108 from 183 balls.
