= Azeem Dar =

Pakistani cricketer (born 1996)

Personal information
- Full name: Azeem Dar
- Born: 11 December 1996 (age 29)
- Source: Cricinfo, 4 November 2017

Azeem Dar (born 11 December 1996) is a Pakistani cricketer. He made his first-class debut for Khan Research Laboratories in the 2017–18 Quaid-e-Azam Trophy on 2 November 2017.

Before relocating to Pakistan Dar represented Scotland and was part of their 2016 Under 19 World Cup squad.
