= Arvind Solanki =

Indian cricketer (born 1978)

Personal information
- Born: 10 September 1978 (age 48); Aligarh, India
- Source: ESPNcricinfo, 12 December 2016

Arvind Solanki (born 10 September 1978) is an Indian cricketer. He played two List A matches between 1999 and 2002. He was also part of India's squad for the 1998 Under-19 Cricket World Cup.
