= Andrew Innes (cricketer) =

Scottish cricketer

Personal information
- Full name: Andrew David Innes
- Born: 3 May 1905; Glasgow, Lanarkshire, Scotland
- Died: 23 February 1968 (aged 62); Milngavie, Dunbartonshire, Scotland
- Batting: Right-handed
- Bowling: Right-arm off break

Domestic team information
- Years: Team
- 1925–1934: Scotland

Career statistics
Competition	First-class
Matches	5
Runs scored	164
Batting average	16.40
100s/50s	–/–
Top score	48
Balls bowled	84
Wickets	1
Bowling average	26.00
5 wickets in innings	–
10 wickets in match	–
Best bowling	1/12
Catches/stumpings	6/–
- Source: Cricinfo, 28 June 2022

Andrew David Innes (3 May 1905 — 23 February 1968) was a Scottish first-class cricketer.

Innes was born at Glasgow in May 1905 and was educated in the city at The Glasgow Academy. A club cricketer for Glasgow Academicals Cricket Club, he made his debut for Scotland in first-class cricket against Ireland at Dublin in 1925. Innes played first-class cricket for Scotland until 1934, making six appearances; four of these came against Ireland, with a further two coming against the touring South Africans in 1929, and the touring Australians in 1934. He scored a total of 164 runs in these matches at an average of 16.40, with a highest score of 48. Innes was an insurance inspector by profession. He died in February 1968 at Milngavie, Dunbartonshire.
