= Romesh Fernando =

Sri Lankan cricketer (born 1977)

Personal information
- Born: 29 September 1977 (age 49); Colombo, Sri Lanka
- Source: Cricinfo, 3 April 2016

Romesh Fernando (born 29 September 1977) is a Sri Lankan former cricketer. He played first-class cricket for several domestic teams in Sri Lanka between 1998 and 2004. He was also a part of Sri Lanka's squad for the 1998 Under-19 Cricket World Cup.
