= Jamie Grove =

English cricketer

Personal information
- Full name: Jamie Oliver Grove
- Born: 3 July 1979 (age 47); Bury St Edmunds, Suffolk, England
- Height: 187 cm (6 ft 2 in)
- Batting: Right-handed
- Bowling: Right-arm fast
- Role: Bowler

Domestic team information
- Years: Team
- 1998–1999: Essex
- 2000–2001: Somerset
- 2002–2003: Leicestershire
- FC debut: 11 June 1998 Essex v Surrey
- Last FC: 9 May 2003 Leicestershire v Loughborough UCCE
- LA debut: 25 June 2000 Somerset v Zimbabweans
- Last LA: 22 June 2003 Leicestershire v Yorkshire

Career statistics
Competition	FC	LA	T20
Matches	25	45	6
Runs scored	204	50	6
Batting average	9.27	5.55	–
100s/50s	0/0	0/0	0/0
Top score	33	13	6*
Balls bowled	2906	1840	90
Wickets	43	46	3
Bowling average	48.58	32.41	45.66
5 wickets in innings	1	0	0
10 wickets in match	0	0	0
Best bowling	5/90	4/36	4/36
Catches/stumpings	2/–	10/–	2/–
- Source: CricketArchive, 7 May 2011

Jamie Oliver Grove (born 3 July 1979) is an English former first-class cricketer who played for Essex, Somerset and Leicestershire during his career which spanned from 1998 to 2003.

== Career ==
Early in his career, Grove appeared for the England Under-19 cricket team, playing Youth Test matches against South Africa and Pakistan, and participating in the 1998 ICC Under-19 Cricket World Cup. He made his first-class debut in 1998, appearing for Essex against Surrey. During the match he claimed three wickets, all in the first innings. He played seven more times for Essex over that season and the next, before moving to Somerset for the 2000 season. He appeared regularly for the team throughout 2000, but only made four first-class appearances in 2001, and at the end of the season, moved to Leicestershire. He played just three first-class matches for Leicestershire in his two years at the club. He played a lot more regularly for Leicestershire in one-day competitions.
