= Peter Thomsen (cricketer) =

Danish cricketer

Personal information
- Full name: Peter Bonne Collenburg Thomsen
- Born: 9 October 1978 (age 48); Glostrup, Frederiksborg County, Denmark

Domestic team information
- Years: Team
- 1999: Denmark

Career statistics
Competition	List A
Matches	1
Runs scored	0
Batting average	0.00
100s/50s	0/0
Top score	0
Catches/stumpings	0/–
- Source: Cricinfo, 15 January 2011

Peter Bonne Collenburg Thomsen (born 9 October 1978) is a Danish former cricketer. Thomsen's batting and bowling styles are unknown. He was born at Glostrup, Frederiksborg County.

Thomsen represented Denmark under-19 team in six youth One Day Internationals in 1998, before playing a single List A fixture for Denmark in the 1999 NatWest Trophy against the Kent Cricket Board. In his only List A appearance, he was dismissed for a duck by Kevin Masters.
