= Gulam Bodi =

South African cricketer (born 1979)

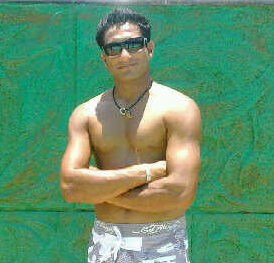

Personal information
- Full name: Gulam Hussain Bodi
- Born: 4 January 1979 (age 47); Hathuran, Gujarat, India
- Nickname: Bods
- Batting: Left-handed
- Bowling: Slow left-arm wrist-spin
- Role: Batsman

International information
- National side: South Africa (2007)
- ODI debut (cap 88): 22 August 2007 v Zimbabwe
- Last ODI: 26 August 2007 v Zimbabwe
- Only T20I (cap 32): 16 December 2007 v West Indies

Domestic team information
- Years: Team
- 1997: Transvaal
- 1999–2004: KwaZulu-Natal
- 2004–2011: Easterns
- 2004–2010: Titans
- 2011–2013: Gauteng
- 2012–2015: Highveld Lions

Career statistics
Competition	ODI	T20I	FC	LA
Matches	2	1	108	144
Runs scored	83	8	5,001	4,105
Batting average	41.50	8.00	32.47	32.57
100s/50s	0/1	0/0	9/22	6/27
Top score	51	8	160*	153
Balls bowled	6	–	4,097	1,506
Wickets	0	–	61	41
Bowling average	–	–	43.42	31.92
5 wickets in innings	–	–	2	1
10 wickets in match	–	–	0	0
Best bowling	–	–	6/63	5/46
Catches/stumpings	1/–	0/–	51/–	35/–
- Source: CricketArchive, 8 April 2016

Gulam Hussain Bodi (born 4 January 1979) is a South African former cricketer who represented his country at the Under-19, Twenty20 and ODI level.

== Cricket career ==
Born in India, he played as a left-handed batsman and slow left-arm wrist-spin bowler. Bodi has represented various teams in South African domestic cricket, Transvaal, Easterns, KwaZulu-Natal and The Titans. In June 2007 he played for an African XI in a Twenty20 game against an Asia XI and made his ODI debut in a game against Zimbabwe later in that years.

He was one of the beneficiaries of the selection policy criticized by Kevin Pietersen, forcing him from KwaZulu-Natal. However, Bodi's selection was understandable, given that in the 1999–2000 Supersport series, from four matches Pietersen only averaged 10.75 with the bat, and took 10 wickets at an expensive 37.50, which were not enough to cement his place in the KwaZulu Natal side. In the 2000–2001 season, Bodi replaced Pietersen and came second in the KwaZulu Natal batting averages with 332 runs at an average of 33.20, and was leading wicket-taker for his side that season with 27 wickets at an average of 25.81.

== Corruption ==
In January 2016 he was charged by Cricket South Africa (CSA) under their anti-corruption code for match fixing in the 2015–16 Ram Slam T20 Challenge. On 14 January 2016 CSA confirmed that it was Bodi that was at the centre of a possible match fixing scandal, and on 25 January 2016 it was announced that he had been banned from cricket for 20 years. In November 2018, Bodi pleaded guilty to a total of eight charges of corruption, and could face up to fifteen years in prison. In October 2019, he was sentenced to five years in jail on charges of corruption.
