= Lowaldo van der Merwe =

Namibian cricketer (born 1986)

Personal information
- Full name: Lowaldo van der Merwe
- Born: 24 December 1986 (age 39); Paarl, Cape Province, South Africa
- Batting: Right-handed
- Bowling: Right-arm medium

Domestic team information
- Years: Team
- 2009/10: Namibia

Career statistics
Competition	First-class	List A
Matches	2	2
Runs scored	27	–
Batting average	9.00	–
100s/50s	–/–	–/–
Top score	20	–
Balls bowled	–	–
Wickets	–	–
Bowling average	–	–
5 wickets in innings	–	–
10 wickets in match	–	–
Best bowling	–	–
Catches/stumpings	–/–	–/–
- Source: CricketArchive (subscription required), 16 October 2011

Lowaldo van der Merwe (born 24 December 1986) is a Namibian cricketer. He is a right-handed batsman and right-arm medium-pace bowler. He was born in Paarl.

Van der Merwe made his first-class debut for the side against Easterns in October 2009, scoring 20 runs in the only innings in which he batted.

Later in the month he made his List A debut, against Easterns.
