= Nasimabe Ambambi =

Namibian cricketer (born 1990)

Personal information
- Full name: Nasimane Elton Ambambi
- Born: 15 September 1990 (age 36); Okakundu, Namibia
- Batting: Right-handed
- Bowling: Right-arm fast-medium

International information
- National side: Namibia

Domestic team information
- Years: Team
- 2009/10: Namibia

Career statistics
Competition	First-class	List A
Matches	4	6
Runs scored	18	6
Batting average	9.00	6.00
100s/50s	–/–	–/–
Top score	8	6*
Balls bowled	342	132
Wickets	2	2
Bowling average	106.50	70.00
5 wickets in innings	–	–
10 wickets in match	–	–
Best bowling	1/44	2/23
Catches/stumpings	–/–	–/–
- Source: CricketArchive, 16 October 2011

Nasimane Ambambi (born 15 September 1990) is a Namibian cricketer. He is a right-handed batsman and right-arm medium-fast bowler. He was born in Okakundu.

Ambambi made his List A debut for the side during the 2009–10 season, against Griqualand West. From the tailend, he did not bat in the match. The young fast bowler Elton Ambambi, who broke into the national team this season, won the Rookie of the Year award.

Career statistics First-class debut Namibia v Gauteng at Windhoek, Nov 12–14, 2009 scorecard Last First-class Northerns v Namibia at Pretoria, Feb 4–6, 2010 scorecard List A debut Griqualand West v Namibia at Kimberley, Oct 18, 2009 scorecard Last List A Namibia v Uganda at Windhoek, Sep 25, 2010 scorecard
