= Alan Duncan (cricketer) =

Scottish cricketer

Alan Alexander Duncan
Personal information
- Full name: Alan Alexander Duncan
- Born: 9 March 1980 (age 46); Kirkcaldy, Fife, Scotland
- Batting: Right-handed
- Bowling: Right-arm medium

International information
- National side: Scotland

Domestic team information
- Years: Team
- 2004–2006: Buckinghamshire
- 2000: Huntingdonshire

Career statistics
Competition	List A
Matches	3
Runs scored	28
Batting average	28.00
100s/50s	–/–
Top score	28
Balls bowled	30
Wickets	–
Bowling average	–
5 wickets in innings	–
10 wickets in match	–
Best bowling	–
Catches/stumpings	–/–
- Source: Cricinfo, 26 January 2011

Alan Alexander Duncan (born 9 March 1980) is a Scottish cricketer. Duncan is a right-handed batsman who bowls right-arm medium. He was born in Kirkcaldy, Fife.

Duncan played 3 Youth One Day Internationals for Scotland Under-19's in the 1998 Under-19 Cricket World Cup. In 2000, he made his debut in List A cricket for Scotland in the 2000 ICC Emerging Nations tournament, in which he played 2 games against Ireland and Denmark. These remain his only appearances for the senior Scottish team.

Following this he played a single MCCA Knockout Trophy match for Huntingdonshire in June 2000. This followed a brief spell playing for the Durham Second XI, with spells with the Northamptonshire Second XI and Nottinghamshire Second XI in 2000 and 2001. Three years later, Duncan made his debut for Buckinghamshire, a county he would play Minor counties cricket in both the Minor Counties Championship and MCCA Knockout Trophy from 2004 to 2006. While representing Buckinghamshire, he played a single List A match for the county against Lancashire in the 2005 Cheltenham & Gloucester Trophy. This match marked Duncan's final List A match.
