= Wessel Myburgh =

Namibian cricketer (born 1990)

Personal information
- Born: 31 May 1990 (age 36); Windhoek, Namibia
- Batting: Right-handed
- Role: Wicket-keeper

International information
- National side: Namibia

Domestic team information
- Years: Team
- 2009/10–2013/14: Namibia

Career statistics
Competition	FC	LA	T20
Matches	2	5	2
Runs scored	5	66	13
Batting average	1.25	16.50	6.50
100s/50s	0/0	0/0	0/0
Top score	2	33	12
Catches/stumpings	0/–	1/0	3/–
- Source: CricketArchive, 28 January 2025

Wessel Myburgh (born 31 May 1990) is a Namibian former cricketer. He is a right-handed batsman and wicket-keeper. He was born in Windhoek.

Myburgh made his List A debut for the side during the 2009–10 season, against Griqualand West. From the tailend, he scored five runs. Myburgh's first-class debut came the following month, in the ICC Intercontinental Shield, against the United Arab Emirates.

In October 2018, he was named in Namibia's squad in the Southern sub region group for the 2018–19 ICC World Twenty20 Africa Qualifier tournament in Botswana.
