= Glenn Foxcroft =

Namibian cricketer

Personal information
- Full name: Glenn Foxcroft
- Born: 22 January 1992 (age 34); Pretoria, Gauteng, South Africa
- Batting: Right-handed
- Bowling: Unknown

Domestic team information
- Years: Team
- 2010/11–2011/12: Namibia

Career statistics
| Competition | FC | LA | T20 |
|---|---|---|---|
| Matches | 8 | 3 | 1 |
| Runs scored | 378 | 9 | 28 |
| Batting average | 31.50 | 9.00 | 28.00 |
| 100s/50s | –/3 | –/– | –/– |
| Top score | 87 | 9 | 28 |
| Balls bowled | 78 | 0 | 0 |
| Wickets | 1 | – | – |
| Bowling average | 50.00 | – | – |
| 5 wickets in innings | – | – | – |
| 10 wickets in match | – | – | – |
| Best bowling | 1/50 | – | – |
| Catches/stumpings | 4/– | –/– | –/– |
- Source: Cricinfo, 6 February 2022

Glenn Foxcroft (born 22 January 1992) is a South African-born Namibian former first-class cricketer.

Foxcroft was born in South Africa at Pretoria, but represented Namibia Under-19 cricket team in December 2010. He made his debut in first-class cricket for the Namibian senior team against Free State in the 2010–11 CSA 3-Day Cup. He played a total of eight first-class matches for Namibia, spread across that edition of the 3-Day Cup and the 2011–12 edition. Playing as a batsman in the Namibian team, he scored 378 runs at an average of 31.50; he made three scores of over fifty, with a highest score of 87. In addition to playing first-class cricket for Namibia, Foxcroft also made three List A one-day appearances and a lone Twenty20 appearance, all in 2011.
