= Ron Fleming =

American woodturning artist

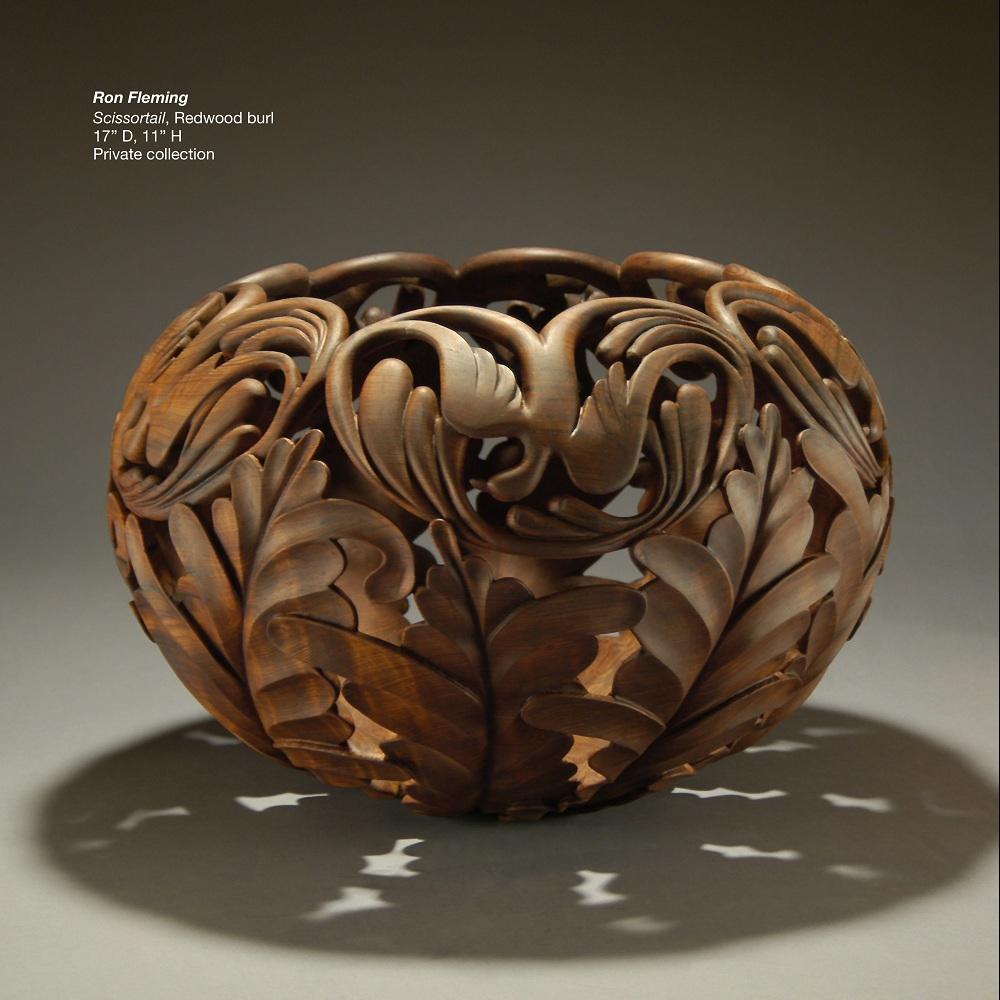
Example of Fleming's featured foliage motifs. Redwood burl wood, lathe turned, hand carved, 2011, Height 11 inches Diameter 17 inches

Ron Fleming (20 September 1937 – 6 December 2021) also known as Ronald Franklin Fleming was an American woodturning artist whose pieces featured foliage motifs. His works are in the permanent collections of American museums such as the Smithsonian American Art Museum, Renwick Gallery and the White House Permanent Collection of American Craft.

== Early career ==
Before woodturning, Fleming was an Art director in the Commercial art business. Over the years he received more than a dozen industry awards from the American Advertising Federation Tulsa (Tulsa Ad Club). He specialized in Airbrush, Graphic arts, and Technical illustration

== Hearthstone Studios ==
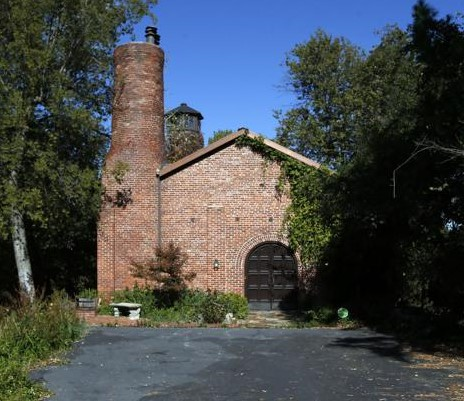
1939 Tulsa Oklahoma Incinerator repurposed into Hearthstone Studios

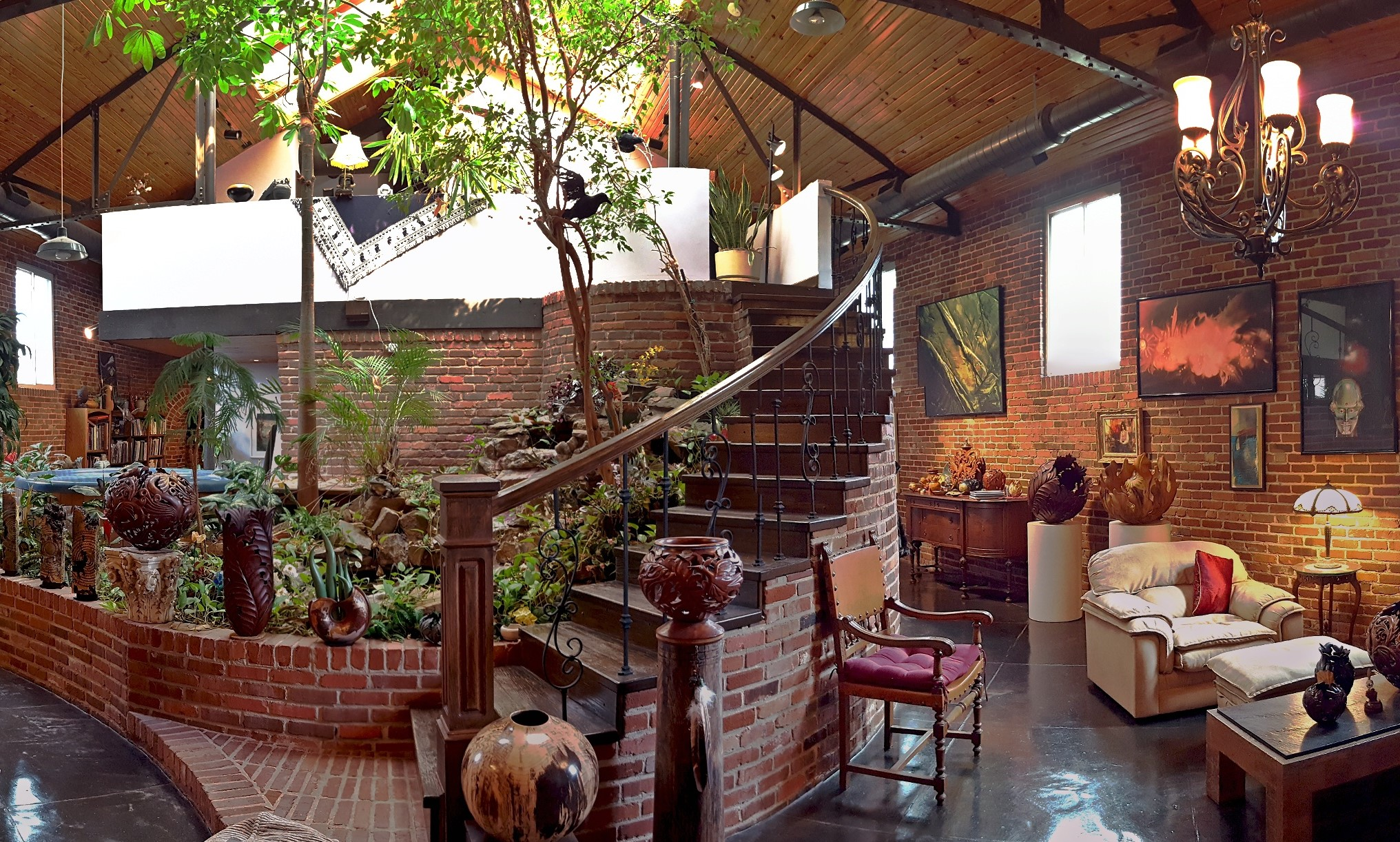
Hearthstone Studios Entrance into Atrium

Fleming converted the Tulsa Incinerator built in 1939 (Declared a Historical Landmark and on the National Registry) into a home, art studio, and gallery "Hearthstone Studios". One of the inferno hatches was left in place to honor the National Registry and Historical Land mark. Major public and private tours have been provided by The City of Tulsa or many other organizations

== Career ==
Fleming began selling his woodturning work in 1986, gaining the attention of art collectors and devoted increasing time to his work. A Founding Member of the American Association of Woodturners (AAW) with more than 365 chapters worldwide and was also a Founding Member and Trustee of The Center for Art in Wood in Philadelphia, Pennsylvania, he was an active participant in the history and growth of both. His earlier experience in graphic design was reflected in his wood turned and carved vessels. Fleming's works have been translated into the media of sculptural crystal and bronze castings. He collaborated with other artist in his field to create artworks that combined both artists techniques. Artist like Bob Hawks, Ron Kent, Linda Stilley, Guy Timmons & Stan Townsend, and many others. The article "Attractive Opposites" written by Stephen Henkin Art Editor, World & I Magazine a publication, compares strengths and similarities of Ron Fleming and Binh Pho whom both had served AAW.

== Permanent collections ==
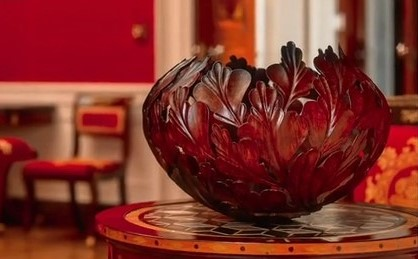
White House Red Room Washington D.C. New Beginnings by Ron Fleming

Smithsonian American Art Museum (Washington, D. C.), Oklahoma State Capitol Collection (Oklahoma City, Oklahoma), Arkansas Museum of Fine Arts (Little Rock, Arkansas), California Palace of the Legion of Honor (San Francisco, California), The American Mission of the United States (State Department Geneva, Switzerland), Kirkpatrick Center Museum Complex (Oklahoma City, Oklahoma), The Center for Art in Wood (Philadelphia, Pennsylvania), Mint Museum of Craft + Design (Charlotte, North Carolina), Los Angeles County Museum of Art, (Los Angeles, California), Philbrook Museum of Art (Tulsa, Oklahoma), Fine Arts Museums of San Francisco (San Francisco, California), Honolulu Museum of Art (Honolulu, Hawaii), Detroit Institute of Arts (Detroit, Michigan), Long Beach Museum of Art (Long Beach, California), University of Michigan Museum of Art (Ann Arbor, Michigan), Cincinnati Art Museum (Cincinnati, Ohio), Museum of Fine Arts, Boston (Boston, Massachusetts), Honolulu Museum of Art Spalding House formally Contemporary Museum, Honolulu (Honolulu, Hawaii), Minneapolis Institute of Art (Minneapolis, Minnesota), Yale University Art Gallery (New Haven Connecticut), Neutrogena Corporation (Los Angeles, California), States Art Council (Tulsa Oklahoma), and the White House Collection of American Craft, permanent displayed in the Red Room (White House) (Washington, D.C.).
