= Alexander Forrester (cricketer) =

Scottish cricketer, cricket administrator, and educator

Personal information
- Full name: Alexander Roxburgh Forrester
- Born: 26 October 1899; Glasgow, Lanarkshire, Scotland
- Died: 11 December 1976 (aged 77); Glasgow, Lanarkshire, Scotland
- Batting: Right-handed
- Bowling: Leg break googly

Domestic team information
- Years: Team
- 1925–1927: Scotland

Career statistics
Competition	First-class
Matches	3
Runs scored	43
Batting average	21.50
100s/50s	–/–
Top score	25*
Balls bowled	510
Wickets	17
Bowling average	17.05
5 wickets in innings	1
10 wickets in match	–
Best bowling	5/66
Catches/stumpings	1/–
- Source: Cricinfo, 12 July 2022

Alexander Roxburgh Forrester (26 October 1899 — 11 December 1976) was a Scottish first-class cricketer, cricket administrator, and educator.

Forrester was born at Glasgow in October 1899. He was educated at The Glasgow Academy, before matriculating to the University of Glasgow. He briefly served in the British Army in 1919, when he was an emergency commission into the Royal Garrison Artillery as a second lieutenant. A club cricketer for Glasgow Academicals Cricket Club, he made his debut for Scotland in first-class cricket against Ireland at Dublin in 1925. He made two further appearances in first-class cricket for Scotland against Ireland, at Greenock in 1926 and Dublin in 1927. Playing in the Scottish side as a leg break googly bowler, he took 17 wickets at an average of 17.05; he took one five wicket haul, with figures of 5 for 66 on debut. As a tailend batsman, he scored 43 runs with a highest score of 25 not out.

Forrester later served as the president of the Scottish Cricket Union in 1956, succeeding William Whitelaw. By profession, Forrester was a schoolmaster. He died at Glasgow in December 1976.
