= Sabbir Khan (Bangladeshi cricketer) =

Bangladeshi cricketer (born 1978)

Sabbir Khan Shafin (born January 30, 1978, in Dhaka) is a Bangladeshi former cricketer who played first-class cricket for Chittagong Division. During his playing career, he was a right-arm offbreak bowler and handy lower-order batsman. Sabbir made two first-class centuries and took over 200 wickets.
