= Mark Ridgway =

Australian cricketer (born 1960)

Personal information
- Full name: Mark William Ridgway
- Born: 21 May 1960 (age 66); Warragul, Victoria, Australia
- Nickname: Ridgy
- Height: 173 cm (5 ft 8 in)
- Batting: Left-handed
- Bowling: Right-arm fast-medium
- Role: Bowler

Domestic team information
- Years: Team
- 1993–2000: Tasmania
- First-class debut: 25 November 1993 Tasmania v New South Wales
- Last First-class: 9 March 2000 Tasmania v Victoria
- List A debut: 15 October 1993 Tasmania v Western Australia
- Last List A: 5 February 2000 Tasmania v Victoria

Career statistics
Competition	First-class	List A
Matches	46	23
Runs scored	462	58
Batting average	11.84	11.60
100s/50s	0/1	0/0
Top score	70	32
Balls bowled	9,829	1,284
Wickets	161	29
Bowling average	33.60	32.48
5 wickets in innings	6	0
10 wickets in match	0	0
Best bowling	6/29	4/37
Catches/stumpings	15/–	3/–
- Source: CricketArchive, 2 January 2011

Mark William Ridgway (born 21 May 1960) is an Australian former cricketer, who played for the Tasmanian Tigers from 1993 until 2000.

Ridgway was born in Warragul, Victoria. After failing to break into the Victorian Bushrangers side, he moved to Tasmania, where he became a regular in the Tigers' line-up. A reliable fast-medium bowler, he was able to generate strong swing, particularly outswing, and made good use of the Derwent River's strong sea breezes to move the ball with good effect. He was also a useful lower order batsman.

In 2012, he joined the Victorian selection committee.
