= Simon Davis (Australian cricketer) =

Australian cricketer (born 1959)

Cricket information
- Batting: Right-handed
- Bowling: Right-arm fast-medium

International information
- National side: Australia
- Only Test (cap 336): 21 February 1986 v New Zealand
- ODI debut (cap 87): 9 January 1986 v New Zealand
- Last ODI: 4 February 1988 v England

Domestic team information
- Years: Team
- 1982–1983: Durham
- 1983/84–1987/88: Victoria

Career statistics
Competition	Test	ODI
Matches	1	39
Runs scored	0	20
Batting average	0	5.00
100s/50s	0/0	0/0
Top score	0	6
Balls bowled	150	2,016
Wickets	0	44
Bowling average	–	25.75
5 wickets in innings	–	0
10 wickets in match	–	0
Best bowling	–	3/10
Catches/stumpings	0/–	5/–
- Source: , 12 December 2005

Simon Peter Davis (born 8 November 1959) is an Australian former cricketer who played in one Test match and 39 One Day Internationals between 1986 and 1988.

== See also ==
- One Test Wonder
