= Ruhann Burden =

Namibian cricketer (born 1983)

Personal information
- Full name: Ruhann Burden
- Born: 8 September 1983 (age 43); Namibia
- Batting: Right-handed

Domestic team information
- Years: Team
- 2006/07: Namibia

Career statistics
Competition	First-class
Matches	1
Runs scored	2
Batting average	2.00
100s/50s	–/–
Top score	2
Balls bowled	–
Wickets	–
Bowling average	–
5 wickets in innings	–
10 wickets in match	–
Best bowling	–
Catches/stumpings	1/–
- Source: CricketArchive (subscription required), 16 October 2011

Ruhann Burden (born 8 September 1983) is a Namibian cricketer. He is a right-handed batsman.

He played his first match for the Namibian cricket team in December 2006, as an opening batsman. In the second innings of his cricketing career, he was dismissed for a golden duck by Jandre Coetzee.
