= Hathuran =

- village
- Location in Gujarat, India Hathuran (India)
- Coordinates: 21°29′54″N 72°58′05″E
- Country: India
- State: Gujarat

Area
  - Total: 1,604.5 ha (3,965 acres)
- Elevation: 29 m (95 ft)

Population (2011)
  - Total: 3,834
  - Density: 239.0/km^{2} (618.9/sq mi)

Languages
  - Official: Gujarati, Hindi
- Time zone: UTC+5:30 (IST)
- Coastline: 0 kilometres (0 mi)
- Website: gujaratindia.com

Hathuran is an Indian village situated beside NH 8, near the larger city of Kosamba. It is well connected to Indian railways. As per the 2011 census, the population of the village was 3,834.

== Geography ==
Hathuran is located about 42 kilometres northeast of the district headquarters, Surat. There are two ponds, Motu and Masjidu, located in the southwestern and northern parts of the village, respectively. The village has an average elevation of 29 metres above sea level. The village covers an area of 1604.5 hectares.
