= Ben Oliver (cricketer) =

Australian cricketer (born 1979)

Personal information
- Full name: Benjamin Carl Oliver
- Born: 24 October 1979 (age 47); Castlemaine, Victoria, Australia
- Batting: Right-handed
- Bowling: Right-arm fast-medium

Domestic team information
- Years: Team
- 2000/01: Victoria
- 2002/03: Tasmania
- FC debut: 17 November 2000 Victoria v West Indians
- Last FC: 5 February 2003 Tasmania v Western Australia
- LA debut: 5 November 2000 Victoria v Tasmania
- Last LA: 9 February 2003 Tasmania v Western Australia

Career statistics
Competition	First-class	List A
Matches	3	16
Runs scored	48	224
Batting average	12.00	20.36
100s/50s	0/0	0/0
Top score	31	40
Balls bowled	246	496
Wickets	5	9
Bowling average	19.80	41.66
5 wickets in innings	0	0
10 wickets in match	0	0
Best bowling	2/13	3/16
Catches/stumpings	2/–	5/–
- Source: CricketArchive, 17 August 2010

Benjamin Carl Oliver (born 24 October 1979) is an Australian cricketer who has played for Tasmania and Victoria. He is a right-arm fast-medium bowler and big hitting lower-order batsman.
