= Golam Mortaza (cricketer) =

Bangladeshi cricketer (born 1980)

Personal information
- Full name: Golam Mortaza
- Born: 23 May 1980 (age 46); Rajshahi, Bangladesh
- Batting: Right-handed
- Role: Wicket-keeper

Domestic team information
- Years: Team
- 2000–2003: Chittagong Division
- 2003–2004: Rajshahi Division
- 2005–2007: Sylhet Division
- First-class debut: 22 November 2000 Chittagong Division v Biman Bangladesh Airlines
- Last First-class: 17 March 2006 Sylhet Division v Barisal Division
- List A debut: 4 April 1999 Bangladesh Cricket Board XI v Karachi Whites
- Last List A: 27 March 2007 Sylhet Division v Chittagong Division

Career statistics
Competition	First-class	List A
Matches	33	29
Runs scored	634	252
Batting average	15.85	15.75
100s/50s	0/1	0/0
Top score	56	39*
Catches/stumpings	68/12	39/8
- Source: ESPNcricinfo, 18 March 2012

Golam Mortaza (born 23 May 1980) is a Bangladeshi former first-class and List A cricketer from Rajshahi. He played as a wicket-keeper and lower order right-handed batsman. He made his first-class debut for Chittagong Division in 2000–01 then moved to Rajshahi Division and finally appeared for Sylhet Division in 2005–06. He took 68 catches and completed 12 stumpings in the first-class game and recorded one half century with the bat.
