= Michael Farrell (cricketer) =

Australian cricketer (born 1968)

Personal information
- Full name: Michael Graeme Farrell
- Born: 24 September 1968 (age 58); Melbourne, Victoria, Australia
- Batting: Left-handed
- Bowling: Right-arm off-break

Domestic team information
- Years: Team
- 1989/90–1997/98: Tasmania

Career statistics
Competition	First-class	List A
Matches	25	32
Runs scored	730	193
Batting average	19.72	11.35
100s/50s	0/4	0/0
Top score	96	37
Balls bowled	2,602	1,346
Wickets	22	29
Bowling average	54.77	33.62
5 wickets in innings	0	0
10 wickets in match	0	0
Best bowling	3/93	4/51
Catches/stumpings	31/–	10/–
- Source: CricketArchive, 22 August 2010

Michael Graeme Farrell (born 24 September 1968) is an Australian cricket coach and former cricketer who played for Tasmania. Farrell was a talented off spinning all-rounder, who seemed well suited to the one day game. His career lasted from 1989 until 1998.

He later coached the Tasmanian under-19 side.
