= Giles Haywood =

English cricketer

Personal information
- Full name: Giles Ronald Haywood
- Born: 8 September 1979 (age 47); Chichester, Sussex, England
- Batting: Left-handed
- Bowling: Right-arm medium

Domestic team information
- Years: Team
- 2000: Nottinghamshire
- 1996–1999: Sussex

Career statistics
Competition	FC	LA
Matches	1	19
Runs scored	15	147
Batting average	7.50	9.80
100s/50s	–/–	–/–
Top score	14	26
Balls bowled	80	570
Wickets	–	12
Bowling average	–	33.91
5 wickets in innings	–	–
10 wickets in match	–	–
Best bowling	–	2/24
Catches/stumpings	–/–	6/–
- Source: Cricinfo, 13 September 2010

Giles Ronald Haywood (born 8 September 1979) is a former English first-class cricketer. Haywood is a left-handed batsman who bowls right-arm medium pace. He was born in Chichester, Sussex.

Haywood made his List-A debut for Sussex against Derbyshire in the 1996 AXA Equity and Law League. Between 1996 and 1999, he played 14 List-A matches for Sussex, the last of which came against Sri Lanka A. In his 14 List-A matches for Sussex, he scored 114 runs at a batting average of 10.36, with a high score of 26. With the ball he took 9 wickets at a bowling average of 38.66. In 1999, he made his only career first-class appearance when Sussex played Leicestershire at Arundel Castle Cricket Ground in the County Championship.

Released by Sussex at the end of the 1999 season, Haywood joined Nottinghamshire, making his debut for the county in 2000 Benson and Hedges Cup against Durham. During the 2000 season he represented the county in 5 List-A matches, with his final appearance coming against the touring Zimbabweans. In his 5 List-A matches for Nottinghamshire, he scored 33 runs at an average of 8.25, with a high score of 16*. With the ball he took 3 wickets at an average of 19.66, with best figures of 2/34.
