= Pradeep Hewage =

Sri Lankan cricketer (born 1978)

Randy Pradeep Hewage (born December 7, 1978, in Colombo, Sri Lanka) is a cricketer who was part of the Sri Lankan squad in the 1998 Commonwealth Games. A right-handed opening batsman, he was named "Schoolboy Cricketer of the year" and captained his nation in the Under 19 World Cup in 1998. After being awarded the title of best batsman in the competition he was called up to the Sri Lankan side, however he is yet to represent them. He has captained the Sri Lanka Colts and his highest first class score of 200 not out was made against Panadura in 2000/01.
