= David Kelly (New Zealand cricketer) =

New Zealand cricketer (born 1979)

Personal information
- Full name: David Patrick Kelly
- Born: 29 March 1979 (age 47); Dunedin, Otago, New Zealand
- Batting: Right-handed
- Bowling: Right-arm slow-medium

Domestic team information
- Years: Team
- 1998/99–2001/02: Central Districts
- 2002/03: Northern Districts
- Source: CricInfo, 3 October 2024

David Patrick Kelly (born 29 March 1979) is a New Zealand former cricketer who played for Central Districts and Northern Districts between the 1998–99 season and 2002–03.

Kelly was born at Dunedin in Otago in 1979 and educated at John McGlashan College in the city. He played under-19 cricket for the national team during the 1997–98 season and made his first-class debut for the New Zealand Cricket Academy side in 1998–99 against the touring Pakistan A team. His Central Districts debut came the following season and he was part of the team which won the Shell Cup in 2000–01.

During the same season, Kelly made his highest first-class of 212 not out, carrying his bat against Canterbury at Horton Park. He played one more season for Central Districts before moving to play for Northern Districts in 2002–03 and played in The Netherlands for Rood en Wit during the 2003 season. He moved to Christchurch to study ahead of the following season and played no more top-level cricket.
