= Gareth Cloete =

Namibian cricketer (born 1978)

Personal information
- Full name: Gareth Warren Cloete
- Born: 13 December 1978 (age 47); South-West Africa

Domestic team information
- Years: Team
- 2007/08: Namibia

Career statistics
| Competition | First-class |
|---|---|
| Matches | 1 |
| Runs scored | 6 |
| Batting average | 3.00 |
| 100s/50s | 0/0 |
| Top score | 6 |
| Catches/stumpings | 0/– |
- Source: CricketArchive, 16 October 2011

Gareth Warren Cloete (born 13 October 1978) is a Namibian former cricketer. He played with the Namibian under-19 cricket team at the Under-19s Cricket World Cup in 1998. He was generally used as a lower-order batsman, generally ninth or tenth within the Namibian batting lineup, as well as being used, as an attacking bowler in partnership with Rudi Scholtz.

In 2007, Cloete made his debut for the Namibia A side, nearly ten years after his only previous involvement with the team, during a tour by Canada, however, he made no impact on the game, neither with the bat or ball. Cloete's debut first-class appearance came in the South African Airways Provincial Challenge against Griqualand West in November 2007. After his playing career, Gareth Cloete started his coaching career with the WHS the Windhoek Old Boys club in Windhoek winning multiple titles. He also coached the Namibian Women’s team.
