= Shannon Tubb =

Australian cricketer (born 1980)

Personal information
- Full name: Shannon Ben Tubb
- Born: 11 May 1980 (age 46); Launceston, Tasmania
- Batting: Right-handed
- Bowling: Slow left-arm wrist-spin

Domestic team information
- Years: Team
- 2004/05: South Australia
- 1999/2000–2005/06: Tasmania

Career statistics
Competition	FC	LA	T20
Matches	12	13	2
Runs scored	238	216	10
Batting average	11.90	19.63	10.00
100s/50s	0/0	0/1	0/0
Top score	45	79	10
Balls bowled	998	249	18
Wickets	13	1	1
Bowling average	50.53	205.00	31.00
5 wickets in innings	0	0	0
10 wickets in match	0	0	0
Best bowling	3/53	1/36	1/31
Catches/stumpings	5/–	0/–	1/–
- Source: Cricinfo, 4 January 2011

Shannon Ben Tubb (born 11 May 1980) is a former Australian cricket player, who played for Tasmania and South Australia. He played as a right-handed batsman and slow left-arm wrist-spin bowler who first represented Tasmania in 1999.
