= Bruce Martin =

New Zealand cricketer

Personal information
- Full name: Bruce Philip Martin
- Born: 25 April 1980 (age 46); Whangārei, New Zealand
- Nickname: Bucko
- Batting: Right-handed
- Bowling: Slow left-arm orthodox
- Role: Bowler

International information
- National side: New Zealand (2013)
- Test debut (cap 259): 6 March 2013 v England
- Last Test: 9 October 2013 v Bangladesh

Domestic team information
- Years: Team
- 1999/00–2009/10: Northern Districts
- 2010/11–2013/14: Auckland

Career statistics
Competition	Test	FC	LA	T20
Matches	5	131	82	37
Runs scored	74	2,626	490	105
Batting average	14.80	19.16	12.56	10.50
100s/50s	0/0	2/8	0/0	0/0
Top score	41	114	37	19
Balls bowled	1,518	27,967	3,806	780
Wickets	12	355	83	39
Bowling average	53.83	37.57	32.30	26.02
5 wickets in innings	0	18	0	0
10 wickets in match	0	2	0	0
Best bowling	5/133	7/33	4/28	3/15
Catches/stumpings	0/0	46/0	24/0	7/0
- Source: Cricinfo, 12 May 2017

Bruce Philip Martin (born 25 April 1980) is a New Zealand international cricketer who played Test cricket for the national team. At domestic level he played for the Northern Districts and Auckland in the State Championship and Northland in the Hawke Cup. Martin played as a slow left-arm orthodox spin bowler and right-handed batsman.

== Early life and career ==
He was born in Whangārei and attended school in Kerikeri in the Bay of Islands.

Martin played three Test matches and nine One Day Internationals for the New Zealand's under-19 team, was selected for the New Zealand A team in 2004 and in the Emerging Players tournament in Australia in 2011.

== Senior career ==
Martin enjoyed an outstanding debut season for Northern Districts in 1999/2000 taking 37 wickets, which led to him being called into the squad for the Test against Australia, and touring England with New Zealand A. He was named the Northern Districts cricketer of the year in 2003/04. He continued to play for Northern Districts until the end of the 2009/10 season, after which he moved to Auckland. He finally made his Test debut for New Zealand in 2013, playing all three Tests in the home series against England. He played two further Tests in tours to England and Bangladesh but was dropped after poor performances, and played his last matches for Auckland in the following 2013/14 season.
