= Rudi Scholtz =

Namibian cricketer (born 1979)

Personal information
- Born: 23 February 1979 (age 47); South Africa
- Bowling: Right-arm fast-medium

Domestic team information
- Years: Team
- 2007/08: Namibia

Career statistics
| Competition | First-class |
|---|---|
| Matches | 1 |
| Runs scored | 6 |
| Batting average | 6.00 |
| 100s/50s | 0/0 |
| Top score | 4 |
| Balls bowled | 72 |
| Wickets | 1 |
| Bowling average | 50.00 |
| 5 wickets in innings | 0 |
| 10 wickets in match | 0 |
| Best bowling | 1/50 |
| Catches/stumpings | 1/– |
- Source: CricketArchive, 16 October 2011

Rudi Scholtz (born 23 February 1979) is a former Namibian cricketer. Born in South Africa, he was a right-handed batsman and a right-arm medium-fast bowler.

Playing for the Namibia Under-19s, he performed in five matches in the 1998 Under-19 Cricket World Cup. It was in this world cup he managed to bowl one of the best Namibian bowling performance of 5/29 (10 Overs) against England who went on to win the U/19 World Cup. Three years later, he would play at senior level for the first time when representing his adopted country in the 2001 ICC Trophy, held in Canada.
