= Pieter Rossouw (cricketer) =

Namibian cricketer (born 1980)

Personal information
- Full name: Pieter Rossouw
- Born: 19 June 1980 (age 46); Keetmanshoop, South-West Africa
- Batting: Right-handed
- Bowling: Right-arm medium-fast
- Role: Occasional wicket-keeper

International information
- National side: Namibia

Domestic team information
- Years: Team
- 2009/10–: Namibia

Career statistics
Competition	First-class	List A
Matches	4	8
Runs scored	35	44
Batting average	5.00	44.00
100s/50s	–/–	–/–
Top score	14*	12*
Balls bowled	357	156
Wickets	5	3
Bowling average	37.80	52.66
5 wickets in innings	–	–
10 wickets in match	–	–
Best bowling	3/35	1/17
Catches/stumpings	1/–	2/–
- Source: CricketArchive, 16 October 2011

Pieter Rossouw (born June 19, 1980) is a Namibian cricketer. A wicket-keeper, he represented Namibia Under-19s at the 1998 Under-19s World Cup of 1998, as an upper-middle-order batsman.

Almost exactly seven years later, he was to represent Namibia once again in a tour of Zimbabwe, playing one match in Windhoek.

Rossouw made his List A debut for the side in December 2009, against the United Arab Emirates, scoring 11 not out.
