= Wilbur Slabber =

Namibian cricketer (born 1980)

Personal information
- Full name: Wilbur Slabber
- Born: 2 December 1980 (age 45); Windhoek, Khomas Region, South-West Africa
- Batting: Right-handed
- Bowling: Right-arm off break

International information
- National side: Namibia

Domestic team information
- Years: Team
- 2007/08–2009/10: Namibia

Career statistics
Competition	First-class	List A
Matches	7	4
Runs scored	39	8
Batting average	3.90	2.66
100s/50s	–/–	–/–
Top score	20*	4
Balls bowled	348	96
Wickets	1	–
Bowling average	214.00	–
5 wickets in innings	–	–
10 wickets in match	–	–
Best bowling	1/57	–
Catches/stumpings	3/–	1/–
- Source: CricketArchive (subscription required), 16 October 2011

Wilbur Slabber (born 2 December 1980) was a Namibian cricketer. He was a right-handed batsman and a right-arm offbreak bowler. He represented the Namibian Under-19s cricket team in two consecutive Under-19 Cricket World Cups in 1998 and 2000.

Finishing not out in his first innings against Denmark in January 1998, he fluctuated between the lower and lower-middle order during the following World Cup in 2000, playing higher against stronger opposition.

Slabber made his first appearance for Namibia for over two years in a List A match against Canada in 2007, bowling five overs. Slabber's debut first-class appearance came in the South African Airways Provincial Challenge against Griqualand West in November 2007.
