= Scotland national under-19 cricket team =

Scotland
- Association: Cricket Scotland

Personnel
- Captain: Angus Guy (Vice Captain) JJ Davidson 2020
- Coach: Gordon Drummond
- Bowling coach: Cedric English
- Manager: Ron Fleming

Team information
- Colours: Blue

International Cricket Council
- ICC region: Europe
- Official website: www.cricketscotland.com
ODI & T20I kit
- As of 2 June 2025

The Scotland Under-19 cricket team represents the nation of Scotland in Under-19 cricket at international level.

Scotland has qualified for the Under-19 Cricket World Cup on eight occasions, the third-most of European countries behind England and Ireland. Scotland has never progressed past the first round, with their best performance coming in 2012 when they won the 11th-place play-off against Ireland.

== Under-19 World Cup record ==
Scotland's U19 World Cup record
Year	Result	Pos	№	Pld	W	L	T	NR
(Australia) 1988	Ineligible – not an ICC member							
(South Africa) 1998	First round	12th	16	6	2	4	0	0
(Sri Lanka) 2000	did not qualify							
(New Zealand) 2002	First round	13th	16	6	2	4	0	0
(Bangladesh) 2004	First round	12th	16	7	2	5	0	0
(Sri Lanka) 2006	First round	16th	16	5	0	5	0	0
(Malaysia) 2008	did not qualify							
(New Zealand) 2010	did not qualify							
(Australia) 2012	First round	11th	16	6	2	4	0	0
(United Arab Emirates) 2014	First round	13th	16	6	3	3	0	0
(Bangladesh) 2016	First round	14th	16	6	1	5	0	0
(New Zealand) 2018	did not qualify							
(South Africa) 2020	First round	12th	16	6	1	5	0	0
(Cricket West Indies) 2022	First round	14th	16	5	0	5	0	0
(South Africa) 2024	First round	14th	16	4	1	3	0	0
Total				57	14	43	0	0

== Records ==
All records listed are for under-19 One Day International (ODI) matches only.

=== Team records ===
Highest totals

- 250/3 (50 overs), v. United Arab Emirates, at Witrand Cricket Field, Potchefstroom, 28 January 2020
- 244/9 (50 overs), v. Namibia, at Avion Park Cricket Club, Kempton Park, 19 January 1998
- 241/7 (50 overs), v. Zimbabwe, at Peter Burge Oval, Brisbane, 19 August 2012
- 236/8 (50 overs), v. Australia, at Conaree Sports Club, Basseterre, 19 January 2022
- 234/4 (50 overs), v. Namibia, at Eden Park Outer Oval, Auckland, 28 January 2002

Lowest totals

- 22 (22.3 overs), v. Australia, at M. A. Aziz Stadium, Chittagong, 22 February 2004
- 75 (23.5 overs), v. Pakistan, at North-West University No. 1 Ground, Potchefstroom, 19 January 2020
- 88 (29.4 overs), v. India, at Dubai International Cricket Stadium, Dubai, 17 February 2014
- 89 (30.3 overs), v. Bangladesh, at Witrand Cricket Field, Potchefstroom, 21 January 2020
- 95 (30.2 overs), v. Bangladesh, at Khan Shaheb Osman Ali Stadium, Fatullah, 17 February 2004
- 95 (35.1 overs), v. West Indies, at Warner Park Sporting Complex, Basseterre, 17 January 2022

=== Individual records ===
Most career runs

- 306 – Ross McLean (2012–2014)
- 300 – Kyle Coetzer (2002–2004)
- 288 – Moneeb Iqbal (2002–2006)
- 270 – Kasiam Farid (2004–2006)
- 240 – Greig Butchart (1998)

Highest individual scores

- 128* (? balls) – Greig Butchart, v. Namibia, at Avion Park Cricket Club, Kempton Park, 19 January 1998
- 100* (102 balls) – Steven Gilmour, v. Namibia, at Eden Park Outer Oval, Auckland, 28 January 2002
- 76 (89 balls) – Kasiam Farid, v. Sri Lanka, at R. Premadasa Stadium, Colombo, 5 February 2006
- 72 (? balls) – Neil Millar, v. Denmark, at Avion Park Cricket Club, Kempton Park, 20 January 1998
- 72 (123 balls) – Michael English, v. Papua New Guinea, at Tolerance Oval, Abu Dhabi, 24 February 2014

Most career wickets

- 19 – Moneeb Iqbal (2002–2006)
- 15 – Gavin Main (2012–2014)
- 13 – Gordon Goudie (2004–2006)
- 12 – Ruaidhri Smith (2012)
- 9 – Gregor Maiden (1998), Chris West (2002), Aman Bailwal (2012), Chayank Gosain (2014), Sean Fischer-Keogh (2022), Charlie Peet (2022)

Best bowling performances

- 6/24 (6.4 overs) – Jamie Cairns, v. Uganda, at Diego Martin Sporting Complex, Diego Martin, 30 January 2022
- 4/26 (8 overs) – Gavin Main, v. Afghanistan, at John Blanck Oval, Buderim, 15 August 2012
- 4/32 (7 overs) – Daniel Cairns, v. United Arab Emirates, at Witrand Cricket Field, Potchefstroom, 28 January 2020
- 4/45 (10 overs) – Ruaidhri Smith, v. Afghanistan, at John Blanck Oval, Buderim, 15 August 2012
- 4/60 (10 overs) – Mohammad Ghaffar, v. Bangladesh, at Sheikh Kamal International Stadium, Cox's Bazar, 31 January 2016

== Squad ==
The 2020 Under 19 squad to South Africa was captained by Angus Guy and vice captain Jasper Davidson. They finished 12th recording one win v UAE

The Under-19 team for Scotland for 2016 Under-19 Cricket World Cup. Scotland's squad was announced on 22 December 2015. Scott Cameron was originally named in the squad, but was replaced by Cameron Sloman after injuring his back prior to the tournament.

Player	Date of Birth	Batting	Bowling style
Neil Flack (c)	8 October 1997 (aged 18)	Left	—
Haris Aslam	12 September 1996 (aged 19)	Right	—
Ryan Brown	2 January 1997 (aged 19)	Right	Right-arm off spin
Harris Carnegie (wk)	4 February 1998 (aged 17)	Right	—
Azeem Dar	11 December 1996 (aged 19)	Right	—
Mohammad Ghaffar	27 September 1997 (aged 18)	Right	—
Rory Johnston	6 July 1999 (aged 16)	Right	—
George Hairs	16 February 1997 (Age 17)	Right	-
Ihtisham Malik	1 March 1999 (aged 16)	Right	—
Finlay McCreath	16 October 1998 (aged 17)	Right	—
Mitchell Rao	3 April 1997 (aged 18)	Left	—
Owais Shah	1 October 1998 (aged 17)	Left	—
Cameron Sloman	20 December 1996 (aged 19)	Right	Left-arm medium-fast
Jack Waller	13 February 1997 (aged 18)	Right	—
Simon Whait (wk)	19 September 1996 (aged 19)	Right	—
Ben Wilkinson	13 September 1996 (aged 19)	Right	Right-arm medium

- Note: bowling information on all Scottish players is not yet available.

== Coaching team ==
- Head coach: Gordon Drummond
- Assistant coach: Cedric English
- Manager: Ron Fleming
- S&C Coach: Neil Elbourne
- Mental Skills Coach: Ali Storie
