= 1998 Under-19 Cricket World Cup =

Cricket tournament

1998 ICC Under-19 Cricket World Cup
- Dates: 11 January – 1 February 1998
- Administrator: ICC
- Cricket format: Limited-overs (50 overs)
- Host: South Africa
- Champions: England (1st title)
- Runners-up: New Zealand
- Participants: 16
- Matches: 50
- Most runs: (Cricket West Indies) Chris Gayle (364)
- Most wickets: (Cricket West Indies) Ramnaresh Sarwan (16) (Zimbabwe) Mluleki Nkala (16)

The 1998 MTN ICC Under-19 Cricket World Cup was an international limited-overs cricket tournament played in South Africa from 11 January to 1 February 1998. Sponsored by the MTN Group, it was the second edition of the Under-19 Cricket World Cup, coming ten years after the inaugural tournament in 1988, and the first to be held in South Africa.

Sixteen teams participated at the 1998 World Cup, up from only eight at the previous edition. After an initial group stage, the top eight teams played off in a super league to decide the tournament champions, with the non-qualifiers playing a separate "plate" competition. The tournament was won by England, which defeated New Zealand in the final to win its first and only title. New Zealand have failed to reach the final since then, whilst England have qualified for the final in 2022 but lost to India. Matches were held at venues around the country, though primarily in the interior, with the main final held at Wanderers Stadium in Johannesburg. West Indian batsman Chris Gayle led the tournament in runs, while his teammate Ramnaresh Sarwan and Zimbabwe's Mluleki Nkala were the joint leading wicket-takers.

== Teams and qualification ==
The twelve ICC members that had qualified their senior teams for the 1999 World Cup also automatically qualified their under-19 teams for the 1998 Under-19 World Cup. Of those teams, nine were Test-playing countries and three were ICC associate members.

- Australia
- Bangladesh
- England
- India
- Kenya
- New Zealand
- Pakistan
- Scotland
- South Africa
- Sri Lanka
- West Indies
- Zimbabwe

The other four teams were invited to the tournament based on criteria set by the ICC – unlike at later editions, only one regional qualification tournament, the 1997 Youth Asia Cup, was played.

- Denmark
- Ireland
- Namibia
- Papua New Guinea

== Pool stage ==
=== Pool A ===
Pool A was known as the Bradman Pool, after former Australian batsman Sir Donald Bradman.

| Team | Pld | W | L | T | NR | Pts | NRR |
|---|---|---|---|---|---|---|---|
| Pakistan | 3 | 3 | 0 | 0 | 0 | 6 | +2.896 |
| Sri Lanka | 3 | 2 | 1 | 0 | 0 | 4 | +0.795 |
| Denmark | 3 | 1 | 2 | 0 | 0 | 2 | –2.901 |
| Ireland | 3 | 0 | 3 | 0 | 0 | 0 | –1.058 |
Source: CricketArchive

12 January
Scorecard

| Ireland; 160 (44 overs) | v | Denmark; 161/8 (48.3 overs) |

Denmark won by 2 wickets
Christian Brothers' College, Boksburg

12 January
Scorecard

| Sri Lanka; 168 (47 overs) | v | Pakistan; 169/3 (46.5 overs) |

Pakistan won by 7 wickets
Willowmoore Park, Benoni

13 January
Scorecard

| Pakistan; 348/7 (50 overs) | v | Denmark; 71/7 (50 overs) |

Pakistan won by 277 runs
Christian Brothers' College, Boksburg

13 January
Scorecard

| Ireland; 159/9 (50 overs) | v | Sri Lanka; 163/8 (48 overs) |

Sri Lanka won by 2 wickets
Christian Brothers' College, Boksburg

15 January
Scorecard

| Denmark; 97 (49.2 overs) | v | Sri Lanka; 100/3 (18.5 overs) |

Sri Lanka won by 7 wickets
Barnard Stadium, Kempton Park

15 January
Scorecard

| Pakistan; 292/8 (50 overs) | v | Ireland; 153 (48.3 overs) |

Pakistan won by 139 runs
Avion Park Cricket Club, Kempton Park

=== Pool B ===
Pool B was known as the Cowdrey Pool, after former English batsman Sir Colin Cowdrey.

| Team | Pld | W | L | T | NR | Pts | NRR |
|---|---|---|---|---|---|---|---|
| Australia | 3 | 3 | 0 | 0 | 0 | 6 | +2.887 |
| Zimbabwe | 3 | 2 | 1 | 0 | 0 | 4 | +0.488 |
| West Indies | 3 | 1 | 2 | 0 | 0 | 2 | +0.618 |
| Papua New Guinea | 3 | 0 | 3 | 0 | 0 | 0 | –4.569 |
Source: CricketArchive

12 January
Scorecard

| Australia; 352/8 (50 overs) | v | Zimbabwe; 249 (41.4 overs) |

Australia won by 103 runs
Fanie du Toit Sports Complex, Potchefstroom

13 January
Scorecard

| Australia; 299/8 (50 overs) | v | West Indies; 228/7 (50 overs) |

Australia won by 71 runs
Fanie du Toit Sports Complex, Potchefstroom

13 January
Scorecard

| Zimbabwe; 290/8 (50 overs) | v | PNG; 143 (39 overs) |

Zimbabwe won by 147 runs
Recreation Centre, Klerksdorp

14 January
Scorecard

| PNG; 59 (26 overs) | v | West Indies; 60/0 (10.5 overs) |

West Indies won by 10 wickets
Manzil Park, Klerksdorp

15 January
Scorecard

| Australia; 398/6 (50 overs) | v | PNG; 139 (34.3 overs) |

Australia won by 259 runs
Vaal Reefs Cricket Ground, Orkney

15 January
Scorecard

| West Indies; 234/8 (50 overs) | v | Zimbabwe; 236/5 (45.1 overs) |

Zimbabwe won by 5 wickets
Witrand Cricket Field, Potchefstroom

=== Pool C ===
Pool C was known as the Gavaskar Pool, after former Indian batsman Sunil Gavaskar.

| Team | Pld | W | L | T | NR | Pts | NRR |
|---|---|---|---|---|---|---|---|
| South Africa | 3 | 3 | 0 | 0 | 0 | 6 | +1.729 |
| India | 3 | 2 | 1 | 0 | 0 | 4 | +1.775 |
| Kenya | 3 | 1 | 2 | 0 | 0 | 2 | –1.320 |
| Scotland | 3 | 0 | 3 | 0 | 0 | 0 | –2.413 |
Source: CricketArchive

11 January
Scorecard

| India; 197 (49.2 overs) | v | South Africa; 201/6 (46.4 overs) |

South Africa won by 4 wickets
Wanderers Stadium, Johannesburg

12 January
Scorecard

| Scotland; 202 (50 overs) | v | Kenya; 208/2 (35.5 overs) |

Kenya won by 8 wickets
Soweto Cricket Oval, Soweto

13 January
Scorecard

| Scotland; 103 (48 overs) | v | India; 104/3 (26.3 overs) |

India won by 7 wickets
Lenasia Stadium, Johannesburg

13 January
Scorecard

| South Africa; 283/8 (50 overs) | v | Kenya; 203/8 (50 overs) |

South Africa won by 80 runs
Soweto Cricket Oval, Soweto

15 January
Scorecard

| India; 253/9 (50 overs) | v | Kenya; 78 (28.2 overs) |

India won by 175 runs
Azaadville Oval, Krugersdorp

15 January
Scorecard

| Scotland; 110 (38.1 overs) | v | South Africa; 111/2 (19.2 overs) |

South Africa won by 8 wickets
Fanie du Toit Sports Complex, Potchefstroom

=== Pool D ===
Pool D was known as the Sobers Pool, after former West Indian all-rounder Sir Garfield Sobers.

| Team | Pld | W | L | T | NR | Pts | NRR |
|---|---|---|---|---|---|---|---|
| New Zealand | 3 | 2 | 1 | 0 | 0 | 4 | +1.905 |
| England | 3 | 2 | 1 | 0 | 0 | 4 | +0.526 |
| Bangladesh | 3 | 2 | 1 | 0 | 0 | 4 | +0.159 |
| Namibia | 3 | 0 | 3 | 0 | 0 | 0 | –2.910 |
Source: CricketArchive

12 January
Scorecard

| Namibia; 105 (43 overs) | v | Bangladesh; 109/6 (28.1 overs) |

Bangladesh won by 4 wickets
Laudium Oval, Pretoria

12 January
Scorecard

| New Zealand; 180 (47.1 overs) | v | England; 181/6 (43.2 overs) |

England won by 4 wickets
St. Alban's College, Pretoria

13 January
Scorecard

| New Zealand; 278/8 (50 overs) | v | Bangladesh; 179 (46.3 overs) |

New Zealand won by 99 runs
LC de Villiers Oval, Pretoria

13 January
Scorecard

| Namibia; 161/9 (50 overs) | v | England; 162/7 (33.4 overs) |

England won by 3 wickets
NF Oppenheimer Ground, Randjesfontein

15 January
Scorecard

| England; 223 (49.3 overs) | v | Bangladesh; 225/7 (44 overs) |

Bangladesh won by 3 wickets
Pretoria Boys High School, Pretoria

15 January
Scorecard

| New Zealand; 372/7 (50 overs) | v | Namibia; 160 (43.5 overs) |

New Zealand won by 212 runs
LC de Villiers Oval, Pretoria

== Plate competition ==
The plate competition was contested by the eight teams that failed to qualify for the Super League.

=== Pool A ===
Pool A was known as the Magiet Pool, after South African administrator Rushdie Magiet.

| Team | Pld | W | L | T | NR | Pts | NRR |
|---|---|---|---|---|---|---|---|
| Bangladesh | 3 | 3 | 0 | 0 | 0 | 6 | +1.594 |
| Kenya | 3 | 2 | 1 | 0 | 0 | 4 | +0.156 |
| Ireland | 3 | 1 | 2 | 0 | 0 | 2 | +0.255 |
| Papua New Guinea | 3 | 0 | 3 | 0 | 0 | 0 | –2.027 |
Source: CricketArchive

19 January
Scorecard

| Kenya; 132 (45.5 overs) | v | Bangladesh; 134/7 (40.2 overs) |

Bangladesh won by 3 wickets
Fanie du Toit Sports Complex, Potchefstroom

19 January
Scorecard

| PNG; 118 (40.5 overs) | v | Ireland; 119/4 (29.5 overs) |

Ireland won by 6 wickets
Lenasia Stadium, Johannesburg

20 January
Scorecard

| Bangladesh; 263 (49.3 overs) | v | PNG; 102 (40.5 overs) |

Bangladesh won by 161 runs
St. John's College, Johannesburg

20 January
Scorecard

| Ireland; 191 (48.5 overs) | v | Kenya; 195/6 (48.4 overs) |

Kenya won by 4 wickets
Gert van Rensburg Stadium, Fochville

22 January
Scorecard

| Ireland; 169 (48.4 overs) | v | Bangladesh; 173/7 (42.5 overs) |

Bangladesh won by 3 wickets
Willowmoore Park, Benoni

22 January
Scorecard

| Kenya; 211 (49.4 overs) | v | PNG; 161 (46 overs) |

Kenya won by 50 runs
St Stithians College, Johannesburg

=== Pool B ===
Pool B was known as the Procter Pool, after former South African all-rounder Mike Procter.

| Team | Pld | W | L | T | NR | Pts | NRR |
|---|---|---|---|---|---|---|---|
| West Indies | 3 | 3 | 0 | 0 | 0 | 6 | +2.930 |
| Scotland | 3 | 2 | 1 | 0 | 0 | 4 | +1.424 |
| Denmark | 3 | 1 | 2 | 0 | 0 | 2 | –0.406 |
| Namibia | 3 | 0 | 3 | 0 | 0 | 0 | –3.733 |
Source: CricketArchive

19 January
Scorecard

| West Indies; 307/6 (50 overs) | v | Denmark; 107 (30.4 overs) |

West Indies won by 200 runs
St. Alban's College, Pretoria

19 January
Scorecard

| Scotland; 244/9 (50 overs) | v | Namibia; 88 (32.2 overs) |

Scotland won by 156 runs
Avion Park Cricket Club, Kempton Park

20 January
Scorecard

| Scotland; 222/7 (38 overs) | v | Denmark; 140 (37.3 overs) |

Scotland won by 82 runs
Avion Park Cricket Club, Kempton Park

20 January
Scorecard

| Namibia; 94 (38.3 overs) | v | West Indies; 95/2 (17.4 overs) |

West Indies won by 8 wickets
Christian Brothers' College, Boksburg

22 January
Scorecard

| Denmark; 305/5 (50 overs) | v | Namibia; 79 (30.5 overs) |

Denmark won by 226 runs
Wanderers Stadium (No. 3 Oval), Johannesburg

22 January
Scorecard

| Scotland; 144 (48.1 overs) | v | West Indies; 148/5 (37.3 overs) |

West Indies won by 5 wickets
Gert van Rensburg Stadium, Fochville

=== Plate Final ===
24 January
Scorecard

| West Indies; 243/8 (50 overs) | v | Bangladesh; 245/4 (46.5 overs) |
| Chris Gayle 141*; Mushfiqur Rahman 3/48 (10 overs) | | Al Sahariar 90*; Ramnaresh Sarwan 2/35 (7 overs) |

Bangladesh won by 6 wickets
Gert van Rensburg Stadium, Fochville
Player of the match: Chris Gayle (Win)

- Bangladesh won the toss and elected to bowl.

== Super Eights ==
=== Pool A ===
Pool A was known as the D'Olivera Pool, after former England international Basil D'Oliveira.

| Team | Pld | W | L | T | NR | Pts | NRR |
|---|---|---|---|---|---|---|---|
| England | 3 | 2 | 1 | 0 | 0 | 4 | +0.475 |
| Australia | 3 | 2 | 1 | 0 | 0 | 4 | +0.174 |
| India | 3 | 2 | 1 | 0 | 0 | 4 | +0.056 |
| Pakistan | 3 | 0 | 3 | 0 | 0 | 0 | –0.645 |
Source: CricketArchive

19 January
Scorecard

| England; 251 (49.3 overs) | v | Pakistan; 233 (48.5 overs) |

England won by 18 runs
Centurion Park, Centurion

20 January
Scorecard

| India; 174 (49.2 overs) | v | Australia; 175/4 (29.3 overs) |

Australia won by 6 wickets
Centurion Park, Centurion

23 January
Scorecard

| Australia; 253/8 (50 overs) | v | Pakistan; 226 (45.5 overs) |

Australia won by 27 runs
De Beers Diamond Oval, Kimberley

24 January
Scorecard

| India; 252/8 (50 overs) | v | England; 152 (33.5 overs) |

India won by 51 runs
Willowmoore Park, Benoni

- Following a rain interruption, England's target (calculated using the Clark curves method) was 204 runs in 39 overs.

27 January
Scorecard

| Australia; 147 (47.2 overs) | v | England; 151/4 (29.1 overs) |

England won by 6 wickets
Newlands Stadium, Cape Town

29 January
Scorecard

| Pakistan; 188 (46 overs) | v | India; 191/5 (40.1 overs) |

India won by 5 wickets
Kingsmead, Durban

- The India–Pakistan fixture was attended by over 10,000 people, a tournament record.

=== Pool B ===
Pool B was known as the Pollock Pool, after former South African batsman Graeme Pollock.

| Team | Pld | W | L | T | NR | Pts | NRR |
|---|---|---|---|---|---|---|---|
| New Zealand | 3 | 2 | 1 | 0 | 0 | 4 | +1.243 |
| South Africa | 3 | 2 | 1 | 0 | 0 | 4 | +0.488 |
| Sri Lanka | 3 | 2 | 1 | 0 | 0 | 4 | –0.040 |
| Zimbabwe | 3 | 0 | 3 | 0 | 0 | 0 | –1.760 |
Source: CricketArchive

21 January

| Zimbabwe; 177 (50 overs) | v | South Africa; 181/3 (38.2 overs) |
| Dion Ebrahim 60 (97); Murray Creed 2/35 (10 overs) | | Jon Kent 84 (94); David Mutendera 2/35 (8.2 overs) |

South Africa won by 7 wickets
St George's Oval, Port Elizabeth

- South Africa won the toss and elected to field.

22 January

| New Zealand; 180 (48.5 overs) | v | Sri Lanka; 139 (46.5 overs) |
| Jarrod Englefield 54 (98); Malinga Bandara 4/20 (6 overs) | | Upekha Fernando 36 (40); Bruce Martin 3/12 (10 overs) |

New Zealand won by 41 runs
St George's Oval, Port Elizabeth

- No toss

25 January

| New Zealand; 194 (45.2 overs) | v | South Africa; 196/5 (45 overs) |
| Lou Vincent 55 (80); Gulam Bodi 4/26 (6.2 overs) | | Morne van Wyk 51 (78); Bruce Martin 2/31 (10 overs) |

South Africa won by 5 wickets
Newlands, Cape Town
Player of the match: Morne van Wyk

- South Africa won the toss and elected to field.

26 January

| Zimbabwe; 137/9 (50 overs) | v | Sri Lanka; 138/6 (42 overs) |
| Mluleki Nkala 33 (72); Naren Rattwatte 3/27 (10 overs) | | Pradeep Hewage 80 (132); Mluleki Nkala 4/26 (10 overs) |

Sri Lanka won by 4 wickets
Buffalo Park, East London

- No toss

28 January

| Zimbabwe; 97 (31.2 overs) | v | New Zealand; 98/0 (12.2 overs) |
| Dion Ebrahim 27 (41); James Franklin 4/20 (5.2 overs) | | David Kelly 46* (45); Mluleki Nkala 0/30 (6 overs) |

New Zealand won by 10 wickets
Mangaung Oval, Bloemfontein

- New Zealand won the toss and elected to field.

30 January

| South Africa; 240 (50 overs) | v | Sri Lanka; 244/7 (49.5 overs) |
| Jon Kent 55 (64); Malinga Bandara 3/44 (10 overs) | | Chamara Silva 85 (111); Victor Mpitsang 2/61 (8.5 overs) |

Sri Lanka won by 3 wickets
Kingsmead, Durban

- South Africa won the toss and elected to bat.

=== Final ===
1 February
Scorecard

| New Zealand; 241/6 (50 overs) | v | England; 242/3 (46 overs) |
| James Franklin 56* (67); Giles Haywood 3/18 (10 overs) | | Stephen Peters 107 (125); James Franklin 1/35 (5 overs) |

England won by 7 wickets
Wanderers Stadium, Johannesburg
Umpires: Johan Cloete (SA) and Stewart Deenik (SA)
Player of the match: Stephen Peters (Eng)

- New Zealand won the toss and elected to bat.

== Future senior players ==
Future players that featured for their national team in the tournament were:

| Team | Future senior cricketers | Appearance | | |
| Team | Future senior cricketers | Test | ODI | T20I |
|---|---|---|---|---|
| Australia | James Hopes | - | 84 | 12 |
| Australia | Michael Klinger | - | - | 3 |
| Australia | Marcus North | 21 | 2 | - |
| Bangladesh | Al Sahariar | 15 | 29 | - |
| Bangladesh | Ehsanul Haque | 1 | 6 | - |
| Bangladesh | Fahim Muntasir | 3 | 3 | - |
| Bangladesh | Hannan Sarkar | 17 | 20 | - |
| Bangladesh | Manjurul Islam | 17 | 34 | - |
| Bangladesh | Mehrab Hossain | 9 | 18 | - |
| Bangladesh | Mushfiqur Rahman | 10 | 28 | - |
| Denmark | Amjad Khan | 1 | - | 9 |
| Denmark | Freddie Klokker | - | - | 13 |
| England | Owais Shah | 6 | 71 | 17 |
| England | Paul Franks | - | 1 | - |
| England | Rob Key | 15 | 5 | - |
| England | Chris Schofield | 2 | - | 4 |
| England | Graeme Swann | 60 | 79 | 39 |
| India | Mohammad Kaif | 13 | 125 | - |
| India | Virender Sehwag | 104 | 251 | 19 |
| India | Laxmi Shukla | - | 3 | - |
| India | Harbhajan Singh | 103 | 236 | 28 |
| India | Reetinder Sodhi | - | 18 | - |
| Ireland | Ed Joyce | 1 | 78 | 18 |
| Kenya | Thomas Odoyo | - | 136 | 11 |
| Kenya | Josephat Ababu | - | 9 | - |
| Kenya | Jimmy Kamande | - | 86 | 12 |
| Kenya | Collins Obuya | - | 104 | 72 |
| Kenya | David Obuya | - | 74 | 10 |
| Kenya | Francis Otieno | - | 4 | - |
| Namibia | Bjorn Kotze | - | 5 | - |
| Namibia | Stephan Swanepoel | - | 5 | - |
| Namibia | Riaan Walters | - | 2 | - |
| New Zealand | James Franklin | 31 | 110 | 38 |
| New Zealand | Peter Ingram | 2 | 8 | 3 |
| New Zealand | Hamish Marshall | 13 | 66 | 3 |
| New Zealand | James Marshall | 7 | 10 | 3 |
| New Zealand | Bruce Martin | 5 | - | - |
| New Zealand | Peter McGlashan | - | 4 | 11 |
| New Zealand | Kyle Mills | 19 | 170 | 42 |
| New Zealand | Lou Vincent | 23 | 102 | 9 |
| New Zealand | Regan West | - | 10 | 5 |
| Pakistan | Hasan Raza | 7 | 16 | - |
| Pakistan | Imran Tahir | 20 | 107 | 38 |
| Pakistan | Bazid Khan | 1 | 5 | - |
| Pakistan | Abdul Razzaq | 46 | 265 | 32 |
| Pakistan | Inam-ul-Haq | 11 | - | - |
| Pakistan | Humayun Farhat | 1 | 5 | - |
| Pakistan | Shoaib Malik | 35 | 287 | 124 |
| South Africa | Grant Elliott | 5 | 83 | 17 |
| South Africa | Michael Lumb | - | 3 | 27 |
| South Africa | Gulam Bodi | - | 2 | 1 |
| South Africa | Jon Kent | - | 2 | - |
| South Africa | Victor Mpitsang | - | 2 | - |
| South Africa | Robin Peterson | 15 | 79 | 21 |
| South Africa | Jacques Rudolph | 48 | 45 | - |
| South Africa | Morne van Wyk | - | 17 | 8 |
| Sri Lanka | Malinga Bandara | 8 | 31 | 4 |
| Sri Lanka | Prasanna Jayawardene | 58 | 6 | - |
| Sri Lanka | Thilina Kandamby | - | 33 | 5 |
| Sri Lanka | Chamara Silva | 11 | 75 | 16 |
| Scotland | John Blain | - | 33 | 6 |
| Scotland | Gregor Maiden | - | 3 | 3 |
| Scotland | Fraser Watts | - | 36 | 11 |
| West Indies | Sylvester Joseph | 5 | 13 | - |
| West Indies | Chris Gayle | 103 | 301 | 79 |
| West Indies | Daren Ganga | 48 | 35 | - |
| West Indies | Ryan Hinds | 15 | 14 | - |
| West Indies | Marlon Samuels | 71 | 204 | 67 |
| West Indies | Ramnaresh Sarwan | 87 | 181 | 18 |
| Zimbabwe | Mark Vermeulen | 9 | 43 | - |
| Zimbabwe | Dion Ebrahim | 29 | 82 | - |
| Zimbabwe | Neil Ferreira | 1 | - | - |
| Zimbabwe | Greg Lamb | 1 | 15 | 5 |
| Zimbabwe | Alester Maregwede | 2 | 11 | - |
| Zimbabwe | David Mutendera | 1 | 9 | - |
| Zimbabwe | Mluleki Nkala | 10 | 50 | 1 |
