= 2014 Under-19 Cricket World Cup squads =

This is a list of the squads picked for the 2014 ICC Under-19 Cricket World Cup. Bold indicates that a player went onto play senior international cricket.

== Group A ==
=== India ===
Coach: (India) Bharat Arun

| Player | Date of Birth | Batting | Bowling style |
|---|---|---|---|
| Vijay Zol (c) | 23 November 1994 (aged 19) | Left handed | Right-arm off break |
| **Avesh Khan** | 13 December 1996 (aged 17) | Right handed | Right-arm medium |
| Ankush Bains (wk) | 16 December 1995 (aged 18) | Right handed | — |
| Ricky Bhui | 29 September 1996 (aged 17) | Right handed | Right-arm leg break |
| Aamir Gani | 11 November 1996 (aged 17) | Right handed | Right-arm off break |
| Akhil Herwadkar | 31 October 1994 (aged 19) | Left handed | Right-arm off break |
| **Deepak Hooda** | 19 April 1995 (aged 18) | Right handed | Right-arm medium |
| **Shreyas Iyer** | 6 December 1994 (aged 19) | Right handed | Right-arm off break |
| Karan Kaila | 8 September 1994 (aged 19) | Left handed | Slow left-arm orthodox |
| **Sarfaraz Khan** | 27 October 1997 (aged 16) | Right handed | Right-arm off break |
| **Kuldeep Yadav** | 14 December 1994 (aged 19) | Left handed | Slow left-arm wrist-spin |
| Chama Milind | 4 September 1994 (aged 19) | Left handed | Left-arm medium |
| Monu Kumar | 5 November 1994 (aged 19) | Right handed | Right-arm medium |
| **Sanju Samson (c), (wk)** | 11 November 1994 (aged 19) | Right handed | Right-arm off break |
| Atit Sheth | 3 February 1996 (aged 18) | Right handed | Right-arm medium |

Source - ESPN Cricinfo

=== Pakistan ===
Coach:

| Player | Date of Birth | Batting | Bowling style |
|---|---|---|---|
| **Sami Aslam** (c) | 12 December 1995 (aged 18) | Left | Right-arm medium |
| Amad Butt | 10 May 1995 (aged 18) | Right | Right-arm fast |
| Ameer Hamza (wk) | 22 September 1995 (aged 18) | Right | — |
| Hasan Raza | 1 June 1995 (aged 18) | Left | Right-arm medium-fast |
| **Imam-ul-Haq** | 12 December 1995 (aged 18) | Left | — |
| Imran Rafiq | 9 November 1996 (aged 17) | Left | — |
| Irfanullah Shah | 5 May 1995 (aged 18) | Right | Right-arm medium-fast |
| **Kamran Ghulam** | 10 October 1995 (aged 18) | Right | Slow left-arm orthodox |
| Karamat Ali | 18 March 1996 (aged 17) | Right | Right-arm leg break |
| Mohammad Aftab | 14 August 1996 (aged 17) | Left | Left-arm medium-fast |
| Mohammad Umair | 31 October 1994 (aged 19) | Right | — |
| Saifullah Khan (wk) | 21 March 1995 (aged 18) | Right | — |
| **Saud Shakeel** | 5 September 1995 (aged 18) | Left | — |
| **Zafar Gohar** | 2 January 1995 (aged 19) | Left | Slow left-arm orthodox |
| Zia-ul-Haq | 11 December 1994 (aged 19) | Right | Left-arm fast-medium |

=== Scotland ===
Coach:

| Player | Date of Birth | Batting | Bowling style |
|---|---|---|---|
| Ross McLean (c) | 25 November 1993 (aged 20) | Right | Right-arm off break |
| Alex Baum (wk) | 20 February 1994 (aged 19) | Right | — |
| Ryan Brown | 2 January 1997 (aged 17) | Right | Right-arm off break |
| Will Edwards | 22 September 1995 (aged 18) | Right | Right-arm medium-fast |
| Michael English | 2 May 1995 (aged 18) | Right | Right-arm medium |
| Nick Farrar | 31 July 1994 (aged 19) | Left | Right-arm medium-fast |
| Chayank Gosain | 27 January 1996 (aged 18) | Right | Slow left-arm orthodox |
| Gavin Main | 28 February 1995 (aged 18) | Right | Right-arm fast |
| Zander Muir | 29 September 1994 (aged 19) | Right | — |
| Abdul Sabri | 28 October 1994 (aged 19) | Right | Right-arm medium fast |
| Chris Sole | 27 February 1994 (aged 19) | Right | Right-arm medium |
| Kyle Stirling | 21 March 1994 (aged 19) | Right | Right-arm off break |
| Andrew Umeed | 17 June 1994 (aged 19) | Right | Right-arm leg break |
| Mark Watt | 3 July 1994 (aged 19) | Left | Slow left-arm orthodox |
| Stu Whittingham | 24 April 1996 (aged 17) | Right | Right-arm fast-medium |

=== Papua New Guinea ===
Coach:

| Player | Date of Birth | Batting | Bowling style |
|---|---|---|---|
| Dogodo Bau (c) | 5 December 1994 (aged 19) | Right | — |
| Kiplin Doriga | 18 October 1995 (aged 18) | Right | — |
| Shakavai Gebai | 5 October 1995 (aged 18) | Right | Right-arm medium |
| Riley Hekure | 31 October 1994 (aged 19) | Right | Right-arm medium |
| Hiri Hiri | 1 May 1995 (aged 18) | Right | Right-arm off break |
| Mea Jimmy | 17 October 1994 (aged 19) | Right | Right-arm leg break |
| Allan Joseph | 24 May 1995 (aged 18) | Right | Right-arm leg break |
| Kabua Morea | 30 September 1993 (aged 20) | Right | Left-arm medium |
| Alei Nao | 9 December 1993 (aged 20) | Right | Right-arm medium |
| Micah Pokana | 13 June 1994 (aged 19) | Left | — |
| Nosaina Pokana | 12 April 1996 (aged 17) | Right | Left-arm fast |
| Raho Sam | 10 June 1994 (aged 19) | Right | Right-arm medium |
| Gaudi Toka | 17 June 1994 (aged 19) | Left | Right-arm medium-fast |
| Anthony Vare | 3 July 1994 (aged 19) | Left | — |
| Tom Wilie (wk) | 24 April 1996 (aged 17) | Left | — |

== Group B ==
=== Australia ===
Coach:

| Player | Date of Birth | Batting | Bowling style |
|---|---|---|---|
| Jaron Morgan (c) | 27 September 1995 (aged 18) | Right | Right-arm leg break |
| Tom Andrews | 7 October 1994 (aged 19) | Left | Slow left-arm orthodox |
| Ben Ashkenazi | 5 October 1994 (aged 19) | Left | Right-arm medium |
| James Bazley | 8 April 1995 (aged 18) | Right | Right-arm medium |
| Jake Doran | 2 December 1996 (aged 17) | Left | Left-arm medium |
| Matthew Fotia | 3 October 1994 (aged 19) | Left | Left-arm medium |
| Alex Gregory | 27 June 1995 (aged 19) | Right | Right-arm fast-medium |
| Jesse Hall | 9 December 1996 (aged 17) | Right | Right-arm fast |
| **Ben McDermott** (wk) | 12 December 1994 (aged 19) | Right | Right-arm medium |
| Damien Mortimer (wk) | 31 January 1995 (aged 19) | Left | — |
| **Matthew Short** | 8 November 1995 (aged 18) | Right | Right-arm off break |
| Kelvin Smith | 5 September 1994 (aged 19) | Left | Right-arm off break |
| **Billy Stanlake** | 4 November 1994 (aged 19) | Right | Right-arm fast |
| Cameron Valente | 6 September 1994 (aged 19) | Right | Right-arm medium |
| Guy Walker | 12 September 1995 (aged 18) | Right | Right-arm medium |
| Sean Willis | 6 January 1995 (aged 19) | Right | Right-arm medium |

=== Bangladesh ===
Coach:

| Player | Date of Birth | Batting | Bowling style |
|---|---|---|---|
| **Mehedy Hasan** (c) | 25 October 1997 (aged 16) | Right | Right-arm off break |
| Mohammad Saddam | 3 October 1995 (aged 18) | Right | Right-arm medium |
| **Abu Haider** | 14 February 1996 (aged 17) | Right | Left-arm fast-medium |
| Joyraz Sheik | 21 September 1996 (aged 17) | Right | — |
| **Jubair Hossain** | 12 September 1995 (aged 18) | Right | Right-arm leg break |
| **Litton Das** (wk) | 13 October 1994 (aged 19) | Right | — |
| **Mosaddek Hossain** | 10 December 1995 (aged 18) | Right | Right-arm off break |
| **Mustafizur Rahman** | 6 September 1995 (aged 18) | Left | Left-arm medium |
| **Najmul Hossain Shanto** | 25 May 1998 (aged 15) | Left | Right-arm fast |
| Nihaduzzaman | 26 August 1996 (aged 17) | Right | Slow left-arm orthodox |
| Rahatul Ferdous | 10 May 1995 (aged 18) | Left | Slow left-arm orthodox |
| Saeed Sarkar | 5 May 1997 (aged 16) | Right | Right-arm off break |
| **Shadman Islam** | 18 May 1995 (aged 18) | Left | Slow left-arm orthodox |
| **Yasir Ali** | 6 March 1996 (aged 17) | Right | Right-arm off break |
| **Zakir Hasan** (wk) | 1 February 1998 (aged 16) | Left | — |

=== Afghanistan ===
Coach:

| Player | Date of Birth | Batting | Bowling style |
|---|---|---|---|
| **Nasir Jamal** (c) | 21 December 1993 (aged 20) | Right | Right-arm leg break |
| Abdullah Adil | — | Right | Right-arm medium |
| **Fareed Ahmad** | 10 August 1994 (aged 19) | Left | Left-arm fast-medium |
| **Hashmatullah Shahidi** | 4 November 1994 (aged 19) | Left | Right-arm off break |
| **Ihsanullah** | 28 October 1997 (aged 16) | Right | — |
| Mohammad Mujtaba | 1 December 1995 (aged 18) | Left | Slow left-arm orthodox |
| Munir Ahmad (wk) | 1 February 1996 (aged 18) | Right | — |
| Muslim Musa | 15 January 1997 (aged 17) | Right | Right-arm medium |
| **Sayed Shirzad** | 1 October 1994 (aged 19) | Left | Left-arm medium |
| **Shahidullah** | 6 February 1999 (aged 15) | Left | Right-arm off break |
| **Sharafuddin Ashraf** | 10 February 1995 (aged 19) | Left | Slow left-arm orthodox |
| **Usman Ghani** | 20 November 1996 (aged 17) | Right | — |
| Waheedullah Shafaq | 2 January 1997 (aged 17) | Right | — |
| Younas Ahmadzai | 16 November 1995 (aged 18) | Right | — |
| **Zia-ur-Rehman** | 30 December 1997 (aged 16) | Right | Slow left-arm orthodox |

=== Namibia ===
Coach:

| Player | Date of Birth | Batting | Bowling style |
|---|---|---|---|
| **Gerhard Erasmus (c)** | 11 May 1995 (aged 18) | Right | Right-arm leg break |
| **JJ Smit (vc)** | 10 November 1995 (aged 18) | Right | Left-arm medium-fast |
| Kobus Brand | 10 June 1994 (aged 19) | Right | Right-arm off break |
| Jano Coetzee | 13 February 1994 (aged 19) | Right | Right-arm medium-fast |
| Marius Delport | 18 March 1994 (aged 19) | Right | Right-arm off break |
| Michau du Preez | 3 January 1996 (aged 18) | Right | Right-arm leg break |
| Zane Green | 11 October 1996 (aged 17) | Left | — |
| Joshuan Julius | 2 December 1995 (aged 18) | Right | Right-arm medium |
| Jean-Pierre Kotze (wk) | 23 April 1994 (aged 19) | Left | — |
| Malan Kruger | 12 April 1995 (aged 18) | Right | — |
| SJ Loftie-Eaton | 11 October 1996 (aged 17) | Right | Right-arm medium-fast |
| Xander Pitchers | 20 February 1994 (aged 19) | Right | Right-arm off break |
| Wayne Raw | 2 November 1994 (aged 19) | Right | — |
| Christiaan Snyman | 4 May 1996 (aged 17) | Right | Right-arm medium |
| Bredell Wessels | 9 March 1995 (aged 18) | Right | Right-arm medium |

== Group C ==
=== South Africa ===
Coach: (South Africa) Ray Jennings

| Player | Date of Birth | Batting | Bowling style |
|---|---|---|---|
| **Aiden Markram** (c) | 4 October 1994 (aged 19) | Right | Right-arm off break |
| Bradley Bopp | 14 March 1995 (aged 18) | Right | Right-arm medium-fast |
| **Corbin Bosch** | 10 September 1994 (aged 19) | Right | Right-arm fast-medium |
| Driaan Bruwer | 6 January 1995 (aged 19) | Left | Right-arm leg break |
| Kirwin Christoffels | 31 October 1994 (aged 19) | Right | Right-arm fast |
| Bradley Dial | 1 April 1995 (aged 18) | Right | Right-arm off break |
| Justin Dill | 10 November 1994 (aged 19) | Right | Right-arm medium |
| Clyde Fortuin (wk) | 18 August 1995 (aged 18) | Right | — |
| Sibonelo Makhanya | 7 March 1996 (aged 17) | Right | Right-arm medium |
| Greg Oldfield | 10 February 1995 (aged 19) | Right | Right-arm off break |
| **Andile Phehlukwayo** | 3 March 1996 (aged 17) | Left | Right-arm medium |
| **Kagiso Rabada** | 25 May 1995 (aged 18) | Left | Right-arm fast |
| Ngazibini Sigwili | 12 June 1995 (aged 18) | Left | Left-arm fast-medium |
| **Jason Smith** | 11 October 1994 (aged 19) | Right | Right-arm medium-fast |
| Yaseen Valli | 3 June 1995 (aged 18) | Left | Slow left-arm orthodox |

=== West Indies ===
Coach:

| Player | Date of Birth | Batting | Bowling style |
|---|---|---|---|
| Ramaal Lewis (c) | 18 August 1996 (aged 17) | Right | Right-arm off break |
| **Nicholas Pooran** (vc & wk) | 2 October 1995 (aged 18) | Left | — |
| Jonathan Drakes | 11 October 1994 (aged 19) | Right | — |
| **Fabian Allen** | 7 May 1995 (aged 18) | Right | Slow left-arm orthodox |
| **Tagenarine Chanderpaul** | 31 May 1996 (aged 17) | Left | Right-arm leg break |
| Bryan Charles | 9 June 1995 (aged 18) | Right | Right-arm off break |
| Tristan Coleman (wk) | 1 January 1995 (aged 19) | Right | — |
| **Shimron Hetmyer** (wk) | 26 December 1996 (aged 17) | Left | — |
| Jerome Jones | 26 January 1995 (aged 19) | Right | Left-arm medium |
| Ray Jordan | 21 October 1994 (aged 19) | Right | Right-arm fast-medium |
| **Brandon King** | 16 December 1994 (aged 19) | Right | — |
| Preston McSween | 15 August 1995 (aged 18) | Right | Left-arm fast-medium |
| **Marquino Mindley** | 29 December 1994 (aged 19) | Right | Right-arm fast-medium |
| **Gudakesh Motie** | 29 March 1995 (aged 18) | Left | Slow left-arm orthodox |
| **Jeremy Solozano** | 5 October 1995 (aged 18) | Left | — |

=== Canada ===
Coach:

| Player | Date of Birth | Batting | Bowling style |
|---|---|---|---|
| Nitish Kumar (c) | 21 May 1994 (aged 19) | Right | Right-arm off break |
| Abraash Khan | 23 July 1998 (aged 15) | Right | Right-arm medium |
| Sudeepta Aurka | 3 September 1993 (aged 20) | Right | Right-arm leg break |
| Nikhil Dutta | 13 October 1994 (aged 19) | Right | Right-arm off break |
| Farhan Malik | 25 February 1995 (aged 18) | Right | Slow left-arm orthodox |
| Amanpal Gillar | 23 June 1994 (aged 19) | Right | Right-arm medium |
| Stephan Joseph | 9 April 1995 (aged 18) | Right | Right-arm off break |
| Aniket Joshi | 3 March 1996 (aged 17) | Right | Right-arm off break |
| Armaan Kapoor | 28 December 1994 (aged 19) | Right | Right-arm medium |
| Trevor Manoosingh | 30 October 1993 (aged 20) | Right | Right-arm leg break |
| Stephan Rajasingam | 10 November 1993 (aged 20) | Left | Left-arm medium |
| Yug Rao (wk) | 20 September 1993 (aged 20) | Right | — |
| Vasu Shah (wk) | 5 October 1993 (aged 20) | Right | — |
| Tahla Shaikh | 25 May 1994 (aged 19) | Right | Right-arm medium |
| Keenen Tinto | 17 November 1993 (aged 20) | Right | Right-arm medium-fast |

=== Zimbabwe ===
Coach:

| Player | Date of Birth | Batting | Bowling style |
|---|---|---|---|
| Malcolm Lake (c) | 3 August 1994 (aged 19) | Left | Right-arm medium |
| Deven Bell | 13 May 1994 (aged 19) | Right | Right-arm leg break |
| **Ryan Burl** | 15 April 1994 (aged 19) | Right | Right-arm leg break |
| Herbert Chikomba | 18 May 1995 (aged 18) | Left | Slow left-arm orthodox |
| Kieran Geyle | 18 November 1994 (aged 19) | Right | Slow left-arm orthodox |
| Joylord Gumbie (wk) | 25 December 1995 (aged 18) | Right | — |
| Shoun Handirisi (wk) | 6 October 1994 (aged 19) | Right | — |
| Dylan Hondo | 28 May 1995 (aged 18) | Left | Right-arm off break |
| **Luke Jongwe** | 6 February 1995 (aged 19) | Right | Right-arm medium |
| **Tinashe Kamunhukamwe** | 10 July 1995 (aged 18) | Right | Right-arm off break |
| Charles Kunje | 27 May 1994 (aged 19) | Right | Right-arm off break |
| Patrick Mambo | 15 November 1995 (aged 18) | Right | Right-arm off break |
| **Tarisai Musakanda** | 31 October 1995 (aged 18) | Right | Right-arm medium-fast |
| Cuthbert Musoko | 13 May 1994 (aged 19) | Right | Right-arm fast |
| Mkhululi Nyathi | 13 March 1995 (aged 18) | Right | Right-arm medium |

== Group D ==
=== New Zealand ===
Coach: Grant Bradburn

| Player | Date of Birth | Batting | Bowling style |
|---|---|---|---|
| Robert O'Donnell (c) | 12 September 1994 (aged 19) | Right | — |
| Jeremy Benton | 14 June 1995 (aged 18) | Right | Slow left-arm orthodox |
| Leo Carter | 10 December 1994 (aged 19) | Left | Right-arm off break |
| Henry Collier | 8 November 1994 (aged 19) | Left | — |
| Josh Finnie | 8 December 1996 (aged 17) | Right | Right-arm off break |
| Shawn Hicks | 10 July 1995 (aged 18) | Right | Right-arm medium |
| Jack Hunter | 28 April 1995 (aged 18) | Right | Right-arm medium |
| **Kyle Jamieson** | 30 December 1994 (aged 19) | Right | Right-arm medium |
| Ken McClure | 25 October 1994 (aged 19) | Right | Right-arm off break |
| Brett Randell | 20 May 1995 (aged 18) | Right | Right-arm medium |
| **Tim Seifert** (wk) | 14 December 1994 (aged 19) | Right | — |
| Dane Watson | 27 September 1994 (aged 19) | Right | Right-arm off break |
| Kurtley Watson | 7 December 1994 (aged 19) | Right | Right-arm medium-fast |
| Raki Weerasundara | 22 February 1995 (aged 18) | Right | Right-arm off break |
| Luke Williamson (wk) | 29 October 1994 (aged 19) | Right | — |

=== England ===
Coach:

| Player | Date of Birth | Batting | Bowling style |
|---|---|---|---|
| Will Rhodes (c) | 2 March 1995 (aged 18) | Left | Right-arm medium-fast |
| Jonny Tattersall (vc) | 15 December 1994 (aged 19) | Right | Right-arm leg break |
| Ed Barnard | 20 November 1995 (aged 18) | Right | Right-arm fast-medium |
| Joe Clarke (wk) | 26 May 1996 (aged 17) | Right | — |
| **Ben Duckett** (wk) | 17 October 1994 (aged 19) | Left | Right-arm off break |
| Harry Finch | 10 February 1995 (aged 19) | Right | Right-arm medium-fast |
| **Matthew Fisher** | 9 November 1997 (aged 16) | Right | Right-arm fast-medium |
| Miles Hammond | 11 January 1996 (aged 18) | Left | Right-arm off break |
| Ryan Higgins | 6 January 1995 (aged 19) | Right | Right-arm off break |
| Rob Jones | 3 November 1995 (aged 18) | Right | Right-arm leg break |
| Rob Sayer | 25 January 1995 (aged 19) | Right | Right-arm off break |
| Josh Shaw | 3 January 1996 (aged 18) | Right | Right-arm medium-fast |
| **Dominic Sibley** | 5 September 1995 (aged 18) | Right | Right-arm off break |
| Jack Winslade | 12 April 1995 (aged 18) | Right | Right-arm medium-fast |
| **Luke Wood** | 2 August 1995 (aged 18) | Left | Left-arm medium |

=== Sri Lanka ===
Coach:

| Player | Date of Birth | Batting | Bowling style |
|---|---|---|---|
| **Kusal Mendis** (c & wk) | 2 February 1995 (aged 19) | Right | — |
| **Minod Bhanuka** (wk) | 25 April 1995 (aged 18) | Left | — |
| Hashan Dumindu | 4 July 1995 (aged 18) | Right | Right-arm off break |
| **Binura Fernando** | 12 July 1995 (aged 18) | Right | Left-arm medium-fast |
| Anuk Fernando | 1 August 1995 (aged 18) | Left | Left-arm medium-fast |
| Gayashan Madushanka | 26 December 1995 (aged 18) | Right | — |
| Lakshan Jayasinghe | 27 May 1995 (aged 18) | Right | Slow left-arm orthodox |
| **Ramesh Mendis** | 7 July 1995 (aged 18) | Right | Right-arm off break |
| **Priyamal Perera** | 2 May 1995 (aged 18) | Right | Right-arm off break |
| Harsha Rajapaksha | 8 April 1995 (aged 18) | Left | Slow left-arm orthodox |
| Hashen Ramanayake | 18 April 1995 (aged 18) | Right | Right-arm medium-fast |
| **Sadeera Samarawickrama** (wk) | 3 August 1995 (aged 18) | Right | — |
| Tilaksha Sumanasiri | 20 January 1995 (aged 19) | Right | Right-arm off break |
| AK Tyronne | 10 May 1995 (aged 18) | Right | Right-arm off break |
| Hashan Vimarshana | 28 November 1994 (aged 19) | Right | Right-arm medium |

=== United Arab Emirates ===
Coach:

| Player | Date of Birth | Batting | Bowling style |
|---|---|---|---|
| Rohit Singh (c) | 22 October 1993 (aged 20) | Right | Right-arm medium |
| Chirag Suri | 18 February 1995 (aged 18) | Right | Right-arm off break |
| Shorye Chopra | 23 January 1997 (aged 17) | Right | Right-arm medium |
| Dan D'Souza (wk) | 9 July 1994 (aged 19) | Right | — |
| Dhruva Praveen | 1 May 1996 (aged 17) | Right | Right-arm off break |
| Justin James | 1 July 1995 (aged 18) | Left | Slow left-arm orthodox |
| Moaaz Qazi | 15 October 1995 (aged 18) | Right | Right-arm off break |
| Mohammad Hamid | 4 November 1993 (aged 20) | Right | Right-arm off break |
| Omer Mohammed | 22 September 1994 (aged 19) | Right | — |
| Pankaj Prakash | 30 December 1994 (aged 19) | Right | Right-arm medium |
| Waruna Perera | 6 June 1997 (aged 16) | Right | Right-arm medium |
| Sajid Khan | 22 June 1994 (aged 19) | Right | Right-arm medium |
| Shahrukh Ahmed | 31 July 1994 (aged 19) | Right | Right-arm leg break |
| Shivank Vijayakumar (wk) | 31 August 1995 (aged 18) | Right | — |
| Shiv Mehra | 14 September 1996 (aged 17) | Right | — |
