= Under-19 Quadrangular Series in India in 2013–14 =

Under-19 Quadrangular Series in India in 2013-14
- Cricket format: One Day International
- Tournament format(s): Round Robin
- Host(s): India
- Participants: 4
- Matches: 14

The Under-19 Quadrangular Series in India was an Under-19 One Day International cricket tournament in the India that was held between Australia, India, South Africa and Zimbabwe. It was held between 23 September 2013 and 5 October 2013.

== Venues ==
The matches were played at the Dr. Y.S. Rajasekhara Reddy ACA-VDCA Cricket Stadium, Visakhapatnam and also played at Port Trust Diamond Jubilee Stadium, Visakhapatnam.

== Squads ==
Australia	India	South Africa	Zimbabwe
Tom Andrews; Ben Ashkenazi; Riley Ayre; Jake Doran; Matthew Fotia; Matthew Kelly; Ben McDermott; Jaron Morgan; Damien Mortimer (wk); Kelvin Smith; Billy Stanlake; Cameron Valente; Guy Walker; Sean Willis	Vijay Zol (c); Ricky Bhui; Akhil Herwadkar; Shreyas Iyer; Sarfaraz Khan; Abhimanyu Lamba; Atit Sheth; Jagdish Zope; Ankush Bains (wk); Aamir Gani; Deepak Hooda; Shubham Khajuria; Kuldeep Yadav; C.V.Milind	Yaseen Valli (c); Corbin Bosch; Lloyd Brown; Bradley Dial; Justin Dill; Clyde Fortuin; Dayyaan Galiem; Aiden Markram; Sine Ntshona; Greg Oldfield; Kagiso Rabada; Ngazibini Sigwili; Jason Smith; Hayes van der Berg	Malcolm Lake (c); Luke Jongwe (vc); Deven Bell; Clive Chitumba; Kieran Geyle; Shoun Handirisi; Carl Mumba; Jack Myers; Mkhululi Nyathi; Ryan Burl; Brandon Diplock; Joylord Gumbie (wk); Charles Kwinje; Cuthbert Musoko; Dylan Nel

== Fixtures ==
=== Group stage ===
==== Points table ====
Under-19 Quadrangular Series in India in 2013–14
Pos	Team	Pld	W	L	NR	Pts	NRR
1	Australia	0	0	0	0	0	0
2	India	0	0	0	0	0	0
3	South Africa	0	0	0	0	0	0
4	Zimbabwe	0	0	0	0	0	0

==== Round 1 ====
23 Sep 2013
(Scorecard)

South Africa; 179 all out(44 overs)	v	Australia; 162 all out(44.2overs)
B Dial 48 (53); M Fotia 3/25 (6 overs)		J Doran 35 (73); Y Valli 3/27 (10 overs)

South Africa Under-19s won by 17 runs
Port Trust Diamond Jubilee Stadium, Visakhapatnam
Umpires: A Deshmukh and MS Pathak

- South Africa won the toss and elected to bat.
- JG Dill, AK Markram, AL Phehlukwayo and H van der Berg(South Africa) made their Youth ODI debuts.

23 Sep 2013
(Scorecard)

India; 291/6 (50 overs)	v	Zimbabwe; 143 all out (41.2 overs)
DJ Hooda 83* (55); KO Geyle 3/32 (10 overs)		RP Burl 46 (55); Kuldeep Yadav 4/34 (10 overs)

India Under-19s won by 148 runs
Dr. Y.S. Rajasekhara Reddy ACA-VDCA Cricket Stadium, Visakhapatnam
Umpires: AS Pathania and R Subramanian

- India won the toss and elected to bat.
- D Bell, J Gumbie, C Kwinje, D Nel and MS Nyathi(ZIM) made their Youth ODI debuts.

25 Sep 2013
(Scorecard)

Australia; 329/3 (50 Overs)	v	Zimbabwe; 182 all out (35 Overs)
KR Smith 139 (137); LM Jongwe 2/49 (5 Overs)		J Gumbie 56 (60); TD Andrews 5/55 (10 Overs)

Australia Under-19s won by 147 runs
Dr. Y.S. Rajasekhara Reddy ACA-VDCA Cricket Stadium, Visakhapatnam
Umpires: AS Pathania and R Subramanian

- Australia won the toss and elected to bat.
- J Myers(ZIM) made their Youth ODI debuts.

25 Sep 2013
(Scorecard)

South Africa; 270/8 (50 Overs)	v	India; 275/6 (39.3 overs)
C Fortuin 90 (99); CV Milind 3/52 (10 Overs)		SN Khan 101 (66); JG Dill 2/34 (8 Overs)

India Under-19s won by 4 wickets
Port Trust Diamond Jubilee Stadium, Visakhapatnam
Umpires: A Deshmukh and MS Pathak

- South Africa won the toss and elected to bat.
- LJ Brown, D Galiem and L Ngidi (South Africa)made their Youth ODI debuts.

27 Sep 2013
(Scorecard)

India; 321/5 (50 Overs)	v	Australia; 156/3 (30 Overs)
SS Iyer 109 (67); KR Smith 2/64 (10 Overs)		KR Smith 74 (76); Kuldeep Yadav 1/18 (5 Overs)

India Under-19s won by 18 runs
Dr. Y.S. Rajasekhara Reddy ACA-VDCA Cricket Stadium, Visakhapatnam
Umpires: AS Pathania and R Subramanian

- India won the toss and elected to bat.
- JP Zope (IND)made their Youth ODI debuts.

27 Sep 2013
(Scorecard)

Zimbabwe; 135 all out (32.2 overs)	v	South Africa; 138/3 (12.4 overs)
C Mumba 32 (37); N Sigwili 3/10 (5 overs)		C Fortuin 54* (35); MB Lake 2/11 (1.4 overs)

South Africa Under-19s won by 7 wickets
Port Trust Diamond Jubilee Stadium, Visakhapatnam
Umpires: A Deshmukh and MS Pathak

- South Africa won the toss and elected to field.
- B Diplock and C Mumba (ZIM) made their Youth ODI debuts.

==== Round 2 ====
29 Sep 2013
[(Scorecard)]

Australia	v	South Africa

Dr. Y.S. Rajasekhara Reddy ACA-VDCA Cricket Stadium, Visakhapatnam

29 Sep 2013
[(Scorecard)]

India	v	Zimbabwe

Port Trust Diamond Jubilee Stadium, Visakhapatnam

1 Oct 2013
[(Scorecard)]

Australia	v	Zimbabwe

Port Trust Diamond Jubilee Stadium, Visakhapatnam

1 Oct 2013
[(Scorecard)]

India	v	South Africa

Dr. Y.S. Rajasekhara Reddy ACA-VDCA Cricket Stadium, Visakhapatnam

3 Oct 2013
[(Scorecard)]

Australia	v	India

Port Trust Diamond Jubilee Stadium, Visakhapatnam

3 Oct 2013
[(Scorecard)]

South Africa	v	Zimbabwe

Dr. Y.S. Rajasekhara Reddy ACA-VDCA Cricket Stadium, Visakhapatnam

=== 3rd place play-off ===
5 Oct 2013

TBC	v	TBC

Port Trust Diamond Jubilee Stadium, Visakhapatnam

=== Final ===
5 Oct 2013

TBC	v	TBC

Dr. Y.S. Rajasekhara Reddy ACA-VDCA Cricket Stadium, Visakhapatnam
