= 2013–14 ACC Under-19 Asia Cup =

Cricket tournament

- Dates: 28 December 2013 – 4 January 2014
- Administrator: Asian Cricket Council (ACC)
- Cricket format: 50-over
- Tournament format(s): Group stage and final
- Host: United Arab Emirates
- Champions: India (4th title)
- Runners-up: Pakistan
- Participants: 8
- Matches: 15
- Player of the series: (Pakistan) Kamran Ghulam
- Most runs: (Pakistan) Sami Aslam (379)
- Most wickets: (Pakistan) Karamat Ali (18)

The 2013–14 ACC Under-19 Asia Cup was the 4th edition of ACC Under-19 Cup. The cricket tournament was held in United Arab Emirates from 28 December 2013 to 4 January 2014. 8 teams played in that tournament. India won the tournament, beating Pakistan by 40 runs in the final.

== Teams ==
No.	Teams	Qualification method
1	India	ICC full member
2	Pakistan	ICC full member
3	Bangladesh	ICC full member
4	Sri Lanka	ICC full member
5	United Arab Emirates	Host
6	Afghanistan	Qualifiers
7	Nepal	Qualifiers
8	Malaysia	Qualifiers

== Venues ==
Dubai		Abu Dhabi		Sharjah
Dubai International Cricket Stadium	ICC Academy; Ground	Sheikh Zayed Stadium Nursery Ground 1	Sheikh Zayed Stadium Nursery Ground 2	Sharjah Cricket Stadium
Capacity: 25,000	Capacity: ?	Capacity: ?	Capacity: ?	Capacity: 27,000

== Group stage ==
=== Group A ===
==== Points table ====
Pos	Team	Pld	W	L	T	NR	Pts	NRR	Qualification
1	Pakistan	3	3	0	0	0	6	1.919	Advanced to the Knockout stage
2	India	3	2	1	0	0	4	2.170	Advanced to the Knockout stage
3	Nepal	3	1	2	0	0	2	−1.263	
4	United Arab Emirates (H)	3	0	3	0	0	0	−2.924	

Source: ESPNcricinfo
(H) Host

==== Matches ====
28 December 2013
10:00
Scorecard

Pakistan; 311/6 (50 overs)	v	Nepal; 179/7 (50 overs)
Sami Aslam 108 (108); Lalit Bhandari 2/56 (10 overs)		Amit Shrestha 60 (107); Kamran Ghulam 4/36 (10 overs)

Pakistan won by 132 runs
ICC Academy Ground, Dubai
Umpires: Razzak Shah (UAE) and Batumalai Ramani (Mal)
Player of the match: Sami Aslam (Pak)

- Pakistan won the toss and elected to bat.

28 December 2013
10:00
Scorecard

India; 320/4 (50 overs)	v	United Arab Emirates; 131/10 (40.1 overs)
Akhil Herwadkar 101 (121); Pankaj Prakash 2/59 (10 overs)		Chirag Suri 26 (31); Deepak Hooda 4/21 (8.1 overs)

India won by 189 runs
Sharjah Cricket Stadium, Sharjah
Umpires: Sarika Prasad (Sin) and Ahmed Shah Pakteen (Afg)
Player of the match: Deepak Hooda (Ind)

- India won the toss and elected to bat.

29 December 2013
10:00
Scorecard

Nepal; 136 (44.4 overs)	v	India; 137/1 (25.1 overs)
Bibhatsu Thapa 47 (105); Kuldeep Yadav 5/31 (10 overs)		Akhil Herwadkar 71 (67); Bhuvan Karki 1/37 (6 overs)

India won by 9 wickets
ICC Academy Ground, Dubai
Umpires: Akbar Ali (Uae) and Sarika Prasad (Sin)
Player of the match: Kuldeep Yadav (Ind)

- Nepal won the toss and elected to bat.

29 December 2013
10:00
Scorecard

Pakistan; 274/9 (50 overs)	v	United Arab Emirates; 124 (38.5 overs)
Saud Shakeel 74 (122); Pankaj Prakash 4/63 (10 overs)		Chirag Suri 38 (41); Karamat Ali 5/25 (10 overs)

Pakistan won by 150 runs
Sharjah Cricket Stadium, Sharjah
Umpires: Batumalai Ramani (Mal) and Ahmed Shah Pakteen (Afg)
Player of the match: Karamat Ali (Pak)

- United Arab Emirates won the toss and elected to field.

31 December 2013
10:00
Scorecard

India; 250/7 (50 overs)	v	Pakistan; 253/8 (49.3 overs)
Ricky Bhui 64 (66); Karamat Ali 4/28 (10 overs)		Sami Aslam 108 (119); Kuldeep Yadav 2/40 (10 overs)

Pakistan won by 2 wickets
Dubai International Cricket Stadium, Dubai
Umpires: Sarika Prasad (Sin) and Buddhi Pradhan (Nep)
Player of the match: Sami Aslam (Pak)

- India won the toss and elected to bat.

31 December 2013
10:00
Scorecard

United Arab Emirates; 159 (42.2 overs)	v	Nepal; 162/6(33 overs)
Dan D'Souza 32 (68); Sushan Bhari 4/34 (9 overs)		Aarif Sheikh 48 (57); Pankaj Prakash 3/42 (10 overs)

Nepal won by 4 wickets
Sharjah Cricket Stadium, Sharjah
Umpires: Ahmed Shah Pakteen (Afg) and Batumalai Ramani (Mal)
Player of the match: Sushan Bhari (Nep)

- United Arab Emirates won the toss and elected to field.

=== Group B ===
==== Points table ====
Pos	Team	Pld	W	L	T	NR	Pts	NRR	Qualification
1	Sri Lanka	3	2	1	0	0	4	1.722	Advanced to the Knockout stage
2	Afghanistan	3	2	1	0	0	4	1.161	Advanced to the Knockout stage
3	Bangladesh	3	2	1	0	0	4	1.073	
4	Malaysia	3	0	3	0	0	0	−5.140	

Source: ESPNcricinfo

==== Matches ====
28 December 2013
10:00
Scorecard

Sri Lanka; 191/9 (50 overs)	v	Afghanistan; 192/7 (47.3 overs)
Hashan Dumindu 61 (105); Zia-ur-Rehman 5/33 (10 overs)		Shahidullah 47 (86); Priyamal Perera 2/37 (9.3 overs)

Afghanistan won by 3 wickets
Sheikh Zayed Stadium Nursery Ground 2, Abu Dhabi
Umpires: Riaz Chaudhry (Kuw) and Iftikhar Ali (Uae)
Player of the match: Zia-ur-Rehman (Afg)

- Sri Lanka won the toss and elected to bat.

28 December 2013
10:00
Scorecard

Malaysia; 50 (25.2 overs)	v	Bangladesh; 51/1 (10.2 overs)
Ahmad Tajudin Ismail 15 (40); Abu Hider 5/8 (8 overs)		Shadman Islam 25* (26); Pavandeep Singh 1/25 (5 overs)

Bangladesh won by 9 wickets
Sheikh Zayed Stadium Nursery Ground 1, Abu Dhabi
Umpires: Zaheer-ul-Haq (Uae) and Buddhi Pradhan (Nep)
Player of the match: Abu Hider (Ban)

- Malaysia won the toss and elected to bat.

29 December 2013
10:00
Scorecard

Bangladesh; 169 (45.1 overs)	v	Afghanistan; 153 (48.4 overs)
Najmul Hossain 58 (86); Abdullah Adil 3/26 (7 overs)		Nasir Jamal 53 (88); Mustafizur Rahman 2/19 (9.4 overs)

Bangladesh won by 16 runs
Sheikh Zayed Stadium Nursery Ground 1, Abu Dhabi
Umpires: Iftikhar Ali (Uae) and Buddhi Pradhan (Nep)
Player of the match: Najmul Hossain (Ban)

- Afghanistan won the toss and elected to field.

29 December 2013
10:00
Scorecard

Sri Lanka; 287/6 (50 overs)	v	Malaysia; 32 (22.3 overs)
Priyamal Perera 68 (98); Pavandeep Singh 3/60 (10 overs)		Harvindran Rajendaran 10 (19); Binura Fernando 4/12 (6.3 overs)

Sri Lanka won by 255 runs
Sheikh Zayed Stadium Nursery Ground 2, Abu Dhabi
Umpires: Afzalkhan Pathan (Oma) and Riaz Chaudhry (Kuw)
Player of the match: Binura Fernando (Sl)

- Sri Lanka won the toss and elected to field.

31 December 2013
10:00
Scorecard

Malaysia; 40 (23.2 overs)	v	Afghanistan; 41/0 (3.2 overs)
Muhamad Syahadat 12 (30); Sayed Shirzad 4/10 (7.2 overs)		Ihsanullah 25* (10)

Afghanistan won by 10 wickets
Sheikh Zayed Stadium Nursery Ground 1, Abu Dhabi
Umpires: Iftikhar Ali (Uae) and Rabiul Hoque (Uae)
Player of the match: Sayed Shirzad (Afg)

- Afghanistan won the toss and elected to field.

31 December 2013
10:00
Scorecard

Bangladesh; 203/6 (50 overs)	v	Sri Lanka; 206/8 (48.1 overs)
Najmul Hossain 62 (88); Ramesh Mendis 2/22 (10 overs)		Kusal Mendis 100 (112); Nihaduzzaman 2/27 (10 overs)

Sri Lanka won by 2 wickets
Sheikh Zayed Stadium Nursery Ground 2, Abu Dhabi
Umpires: Riaz Chaudhry (Kuw) and Afzalkhan Pathan (Oma)
Player of the match: Kusal Mendis (Sl)

- Bangladesh won the toss and elected to bat.

== Knockout stage ==
=== Bracket ===
Semifinals
A1	Pakistan	199/8 (48.2 overs)
B2	Afghanistan	196 (48.4 overs)
B1	Sri Lanka	223/8 (50 overs)
A2	India	224/7 (49.1 overs)

Final
A1	Pakistan	274/9 (50 overs)
A2	India	314/8 (50 overs)

=== Semi finals ===
2 January 2014
10:00
Scorecard

Afghanistan; 196 (48.4 overs)	v	Pakistan; 199/8 (48.2 overs)
Hashmatullah Shahidi 51 (91); Karamat Ali 5/33 (10 overs)		Sami Aslam 75 (80); Zia-ur-Rehman 2/40 (9.2 overs)

Pakistan won by 2 wickets
Sharjah Cricket Stadium, Sharjah
Umpires: Iftikhar Ali (Uae) and Sarika Prasad (Sin)
Player of the match: Karamat Ali (Pak)

- Afghanistan won the toss and elected to bat.

2 January 2014
10:00
Scorecard

Sri Lanka; 223/8 (50 overs)	v	India; 224/7 (49.1 overs)
Hashan Dumindu 60 (109); Kuldeep Yadav 3/49 (10 overs)		Ankush Bains 54 (53); Anuk Fernando 2/57 (9.1 overs)

India won by 3 wickets
ICC Academy Ground, Dubai
Umpires: Buddhi Pradhan (Nep) and Riaz Chaudhry (Kuw)
Player of the match: Ankush Bains (Ind)

- India won the toss and elected to field.

=== Final ===
4 January 2014
10:00
Scorecard

India; 314/8 (50 overs)	v	Pakistan; 274/9 (50 overs)
Sanju Samson 100 (87); Zafar Gohar 2/52 (10 overs)		Kamran Ghulam 102* (89); Kuldeep Yadav 3/72 (10 overs)

India won by 40 runs
Sharjah Cricket Stadium, Sharjah
Umpires: Sarika Prasad (Sin) and Buddhi Pradhan (Nep)
Player of the match: Vijay Zol (Ind)

- Pakistan won the toss and elected to field.

== Final standings ==
Pos.	Team
1	India
2	Pakistan
3	Sri Lanka
4	Afghanistan
5	Bangladesh
6	Nepal
7	United Arab Emirates
8	Malaysia
