= Marius Delport =

Marius Delport may refer to:

- Marius Delport (cricketer)
- Marius Delport (rugby union)
