= Greg Oldfield =

South African cricketer (born 1995)

Personal information
- Born: 10 February 1995 (age 31)
- Batting: Right-handed
- Source: ESPNcricinfo

Greg Oldfield (born 10 February 1995) is a South African first-class cricketer. He was part of South Africa's squad for the 2014 ICC Under-19 Cricket World Cup.
