= Wayne Raw =

Namibian cricketer (born 1994)

Personal information
- Born: 2 November 1994 (age 32)
- Batting: Right-handed
- Source: ESPNcricinfo

Wayne Raw (born 2 November 1994) is a Namibian first-class cricketer. He played in the 2014 ICC Under-19 Cricket World Cup.
