= Josh Finnie =

New Zealander cricketer (born 1996)

Personal information
- Full name: Joshua Liam Finnie
- Born: 18 December 1996 (age 29)
- Batting: Right-handed
- Bowling: Right-arm off break
- Source: ESPNcricinfo

Joshua Finnie (born 18 December 1996) is a New Zealand first-class cricketer. He was part of New Zealand's squad for the 2014 ICC Under-19 Cricket World Cup.

== Career ==
In December 2015, he was named as the captain of New Zealand's squad for the 2016 Under-19 Cricket World Cup.

In June 2018, he was awarded a contract with Otago for the 2018–19 season. In June 2020, he was offered a contract by Otago ahead of the 2020–21 domestic cricket season.
