= Ramaal Lewis =

West Indian cricketer (born 1996)

Personal information
- Born: 18 August 1996 (age 30); Westmoreland, Jamaica
- Batting: Right-handed

Career statistics
Competition	FC	LA	T20
Matches	3	25	8
Runs scored	26	175	91
Batting average	13.00	15.90	18.20
100s/50s	0/0	0/0	0/0
Top score	11	40	37*
Balls bowled	438	1,029	96
Wickets	2	31	5
Bowling average	90.50	24.35	24.80
5 wickets in innings	0	0	0
10 wickets in match	0	0	0
Best bowling	1/46	4/25	2/23
Catches/stumpings	2/–	9/–	3/–
- Source: ESPNcricinfo

Ramaal Lewis (born 18 August 1996) is a Jamaican cricketer. He was part of the West Indies' squad for the 2014 ICC Under-19 Cricket World Cup. In May 2018, he was selected to play for the Guyana national cricket team in the Professional Cricket League draft, ahead of the 2018–19 season. He made his Twenty20 debut on 12 September 2019, for the Jamaica Tallawahs, in the 2019 Caribbean Premier League. The following month, he was named in Guyana's squad for the 2019–20 Regional Super50 tournament.

In June 2020, he was selected by Guyana, in the players' draft hosted by Cricket West Indies ahead of the 2020–21 domestic season.
