= Lakshan Jayasinghe =

Sri Lankan cricketer (born 1995)

Personal information
- Born: 27 May 1995 (age 31); Kalubowila, Sri Lanka
- Batting: Right-handed
- Source: ESPNcricinfo

Lakshan Jayasinghe (born 27 May 1995) is a Sri Lankan first-class cricketer. He was part of Sri Lanka's squad for the 2014 ICC Under-19 Cricket World Cup.
