= Bradley Dial =

South African cricketer (born 1995)

Personal information
- Full name: Bradley Dial
- Born: 1 April 1995 (age 31); Boksburg, Gauteng, South Africa
- Batting: Right-handed
- Bowling: Right-arm offbreak

Domestic team information
- Years: Team
- 2014–present: Gauteng

Career statistics
Competition	FC	LA	T20
Matches	7	3	10
Runs scored	248	21	65
Batting average	24.80	7.00	9.28
100s/50s	0/2	0/0	0/0
Top score	94*	18	18
Balls bowled	6	0	12
Wickets	0	0	0
Bowling average	—	—	—
5 wickets in innings	0	0	0
10 wickets in match	0	0	0
Best bowling	—	—	—
Catches/stumpings	3/0	0/0	2/0
- Source: ESPNcricinfo, 10 October 2020

Bradley Dial (born 1 April 1995) is a South African first-class cricketer. He was part of South Africa's squad for the 2014 ICC Under-19 Cricket World Cup. He was included in the Gauteng cricket team squad for the 2015 Africa T20 Cup.
