= Cuthbert Musoko =

Zimbabwean cricketer (born 1994)

Personal information
- Born: 13 May 1994 (age 32); Harare, Zimbabwe
- Batting: Right-handed
- Source: ESPNcricinfo

Cuthbert Musoko (born 13 May 1994) is a Zimbabwean first-class cricketer. He was part of Zimbabwe's squad for the 2014 ICC Under-19 Cricket World Cup. In December 2020, he was selected to play for the Eagles in the 2020–21 Logan Cup.
