= Mkhululi Nyathi (cricketer) =

Zimbabwean cricketer (born 1995)

Personal information
- Born: 13 March 1995 (age 31); Redcliff, Zimbabwe
- Batting: Right-handed
- Source: ESPNcricinfo

Mkhululi Nyathi (born 13 March 1995) is a Zimbabwean first-class cricketer. He was part of Zimbabwe's squad for the 2014 ICC Under-19 Cricket World Cup. In February 2017, he was named in an academy squad by Zimbabwe Cricket to tour England later that year.
