= Rohit Singh =

Emirati cricketer (born 1993)

Rohit Singh Jamwal
Personal information
- Full name: Rohit Singh Jamwal
- Born: 22 October 1993 (age 33)
- Batting: Right-handed
- Bowling: Right-arm Medium
- Role: Batting Allrounder

International information
- National side: United Arab Emirates
- Source: ESPNcricinfo, 17 October 2016

Rohit Singh Jamwal (born 22 October 1993) is a former Emirati cricketer and captain who represented the United Arab Emirates national cricket team at various levels, including Under-15, Under-19, and the senior national team. Known for his leadership, he captained the UAE Under-19 squad and led Heriot-Watt University to four consecutive championships in the Red Bull Campus Cricket tournament. Following his cricket career, Jamwal transitioned into a career as a data scientist.

== Early life and education ==
Born on October 22, 1993, Jamwal was educated at Delhi Private School in Sharjah before pursuing a Bachelor's in Mechanical Engineering and a Master's in Data Science at Heriot-Watt University in Dubai.

== Youth international career ==
- Under-15s: Jamwal's cricket talent was evident from a young age, and he represented the UAE Under-15 in the ACC Elite Asia Cup in 2007.
- Under-19s: He had a distinguished Under-19 career, captaining the UAE team in numerous prestigious tournaments:
  - 2014 ICC Under-19 Cricket World Cup
  - ACC Under-19 Asia Cup 2013
  - Tri-Nation Series with England and Pakistan in 2013
  - ACC Under-19 Elite Cup 2013

== University cricket career ==
- Heriot-Watt University: While studying in Dubai, Jamwal was a prominent figure in the university's cricket program. As captain of the Heriot-Watt University team, Jamwal achieved an extraordinary record by winning 16 consecutive knockout matches to qualify for four Red Bull Campus Cricket World Championships.
- Red Bull Campus Cricket World Finals: As captain, he led his university's team to the World Finals of the Red Bull Campus Cricket tournament on multiple occasions in India and Sri Lanka (2015 - 2018), competing against top university teams from cricket-playing nations. He led his side to victories over India, Pakistan, and Zimbabwe in different editions of the world finals.
- Awards: His stellar performance earned him numerous individual accolades, including multiple "Best Batsman" and "Player of the Tournament" awards. He was also recognized for his leadership qualities with the "Best Leader Award" from Red Bull in 2018.

== UAE national team career ==
- 2015 ICC Cricket World Cup: Jamwal was part of the UAE's provisional squad for the 2015 ICC Cricket World Cup.
- 2014 ICC T20 World Cup: Jamwal was selected for the UAE squad for the 2014 ICC T20 World Cup in Bangladesh. His selection at a young age demonstrated his potential.
- International appearances: Jamwal made his List A debut for the UAE in a series against Oman in October 2016.
- UAE 'A' team captaincy: Jamwal also gained further leadership experience by captaining the UAE 'A' and Emirates Cricket Board (ECB) Development teams in several unofficial matches.

== Playing style and recognition ==
As a right-handed middle-order batsman and a right-arm medium-pace bowler, Jamwal was a batting all-rounder. His leadership qualities were recognized by Red Bull, which awarded him the Best Leader Award in 2018.

== Post-cricket career ==
After ending his professional cricket career, Jamwal pursued a corporate career, leveraging his Data Science education. Since January 2019, he has been working as a data scientist.
