= Nihaduzzaman =

Bangladeshi cricketer (born 1998)

Personal information
- Full name: Mohammad Nihaduzzaman
- Born: 28 November 1998 (age 27); Rajshahi, Bangladesh
- Batting: Right-handed
- Bowling: Slow left-arm orthodox
- Role: bowler
- Source: ESPNcricinfo

Nihaduzzaman (born 28 November 1998) is a Bangladeshi cricketer. He made his Twenty20 debut for Rajshahi Kings on 4 November 2017 in the 2017–18 Bangladesh Premier League. He was the joint-leading wicket-taker in the 2017–18 National Cricket League tournament, with 21 dismissals.

== Career ==
He was added to the squad of Bangladesh U-19 team for 2014 Under-19 Cricket World Cup.

In October 2018, he was named in the squad for the Chittagong Vikings team, following the draft for the 2018–19 Bangladesh Premier League.

== Accidents and injuries ==
In 2015, while travelling towards Rajshahi to play for the Rajshahi division he suffered severe injuries on head and skull on a road accident when two busses collided. But he returned to cricket later in the same year. In 2017, his hand was broken when a ball hit his hand and after recovering from the injury he again returned to cricket in 2019.
