= Ray Jordan =

West Indian cricketer (born 1994)

Personal information
- Full name: Ray Osrick Oswayne Jordan
- Born: 21 October 1994 (age 32); Kingstown, St Vincent
- Batting: Right-handed
- Bowling: Right-arm Fast medium

Domestic team information
- Years: Team
- 2014: St Lucia Zouks
- 2017–2021: Windward Islands

Career statistics
Competition	FC	LA	T20
Matches	15	5	4
Runs scored	220	30	15
Batting average	9.56	7.50	7.50
100s/50s	0/0	0/0	0/0
Top score	29	18	9
Balls bowled	1,933	215	72
Wickets	34	7	5
Bowling average	33.61	33.85	23.20
5 wickets in innings	0	0	0
10 wickets in match	0	0	0
Best bowling	4/41	3/45	3/39
Catches/stumpings	5/–	0/–	0/–
- Source: ESPN Cricinfo, 02 November 2023

Ray Jordan (born 21 October 1994) is a West Indies Under-19s cricketer who played at the 2014 Under-19 World Cup. He was born in Kingstown, St Vincent. He made his first-class debut for the Windward Islands in the 2017–18 Regional Four Day Competition on 2 November 2017. In October 2019, he was named in the Windward Islands' squad for the 2019–20 Regional Super50 tournament. He made his List A debut on 7 November 2019, for the Windward Islands in the 2019–20 Regional Super50 tournament.
