= Ngazibini Sigwili =

South African cricketer (born 1995)

Personal information
- Born: 12 June 1995 (age 31); Mthatha, South Africa
- Batting: Left-handed
- Source: ESPNcricinfo

Ngazibini Sigwili (born 12 June 1995) is a South African cricketer. He was part of South Africa's squad for the 2014 ICC Under-19 Cricket World Cup. He was included in the Eastern Province cricket team squad for the 2015 Africa T20 Cup.
