= Mohammad Mujtaba =

Afghan cricketer (born 1995)

Personal information
- Born: 1 December 1995 (age 30)
- Batting: Left-handed

Career statistics
Competition	First-class
Matches	1
Runs scored	7
Batting average	3.5
100s/50s	0/0
Top score	4
Balls bowled	12
Wickets	0
Bowling average	–
5 wickets in innings	–
10 wickets in match	–
Best bowling	–
Catches/stumpings	0/–
Medal record
Men's Cricket
Representing Afghanistan
Asian Games
Silver medal – second place	2014 Incheon	Team
- Source: Cricinfo, 4 December 2020

Mohammad Mujtaba (born 1 December 1995) is an Afghan first-class cricketer. He competed at the 2014 Asian Games and in the 2014 ICC Under-19 Cricket World Cup.
