= 2014 Under-19 Cricket World Cup =

One-day cricket competition in the UAE

2014 ICC Under-19 Cricket World Cup
- Dates: 14 February – 1 March 2014
- Administrator: International Cricket Council (ICC)
- Cricket format: Limited-overs (50 overs)
- Tournament format(s): Round-robin and knockout
- Host: United Arab Emirates
- Champions: South Africa (1st title)
- Runners-up: Pakistan
- Participants: 16
- Matches: 48
- Player of the series: (South Africa) Aiden Markram
- Most runs: (Bangladesh) Shadman Islam (406)
- Most wickets: (Sri Lanka) Anuk Fernando (15)
- Official website: Official website

The 2014 ICC Under-19 Cricket World Cup was a one-day cricket competition for sixteen international U-19 cricketing teams which was played in the United Arab Emirates. It was the tenth edition of the Under-19 Cricket World Cup. Sixteen nations competed: the ten Test-playing teams, the United Arab Emirates as hosts, and five additional associate and affiliate qualifiers (Afghanistan, Canada, Namibia, Papua New Guinea, and Scotland). India entered the tournament as defending champions, having won the title in 2012 in Australia under the captaincy of Unmukt Chand. In the final, South Africa beat Pakistan by six wickets to win the tournament. South Africa captain Aiden Markram was awarded Man of the Series.

== Qualification ==
Sixteen teams participated in the competition: the 10 nations with ICC Full Membership automatically qualified for the tournament, the UAE qualified as the hosts, and five additional teams qualified through the different regional tournaments. Unlike the previous tournament, there was no global qualifier for this world cup: rather, the winner of each of five regional tournaments directly qualified for the World Cup.

| Team | Mode of qualification |
|---|---|
| Australia | ICC Full Member |
| Bangladesh | ICC Full Member |
| England | ICC Full Member |
| India | ICC Full Member |
| New Zealand | ICC Full Member |
| Pakistan | ICC Full Member |
| South Africa | ICC Full Member |
| Sri Lanka | ICC Full Member |
| West Indies | ICC Full Member |
| Zimbabwe | ICC Full Member |
| United Arab Emirates | Host of the tournament |
| Afghanistan | Champion of 2013 ACC Under-19 Elite Cup |
| Namibia | Champion of 2013 ICC Africa U-19 Qualifier |
| Scotland | Champion of 2013 ICC Europe Division 1 |
| Papua New Guinea | Champion of 2013 EAP U-19 Championship |
| Canada | Champion of 2013 ICC Americas U-19 Championship Division 1 |

== Venues ==
The following venues were used for the tournament:

| City | Stadium |
|---|---|
| Abu Dhabi | Sheikh Zayed Stadium |
| Abu Dhabi | Sheikh Zayed Stadium Nursery 1 |
| Abu Dhabi | Sheikh Zayed Stadium Nursery 2 |
| Dubai | Dubai International Stadium |
| Dubai | ICC Academy |
| Dubai | ICC Academy Ground No. 2 |
| Sharjah | Sharjah Cricket Stadium |

== Groups ==
The following groups were chosen for the World Cup 2012 by the International Cricket Council. The tournament began with a league stage consisting of four groups of four. Each team played each of the other teams in its group once.

Group A

- India
- Pakistan
- Scotland
- Papua New Guinea

Group B

- Australia
- Bangladesh
- Afghanistan
- Namibia

Group C

- South Africa
- West Indies
- Zimbabwe
- Canada

Group D

- New Zealand
- England
- Sri Lanka
- United Arab Emirates

== Squads ==
Each country selected a 15-man squad for the tournament.

== Fixtures ==
The tournament groups and fixtures were released on 14 December 2013.

=== Warm-up games ===
Warm-up matches

10 February
Scorecard

| India; 209 (45.5 overs) | v | Sri Lanka; 212/5 (48.5 overs) |
| Deepak Hooda 39 (56); Binura Fernando 4/42 (7.5 overs) | | Sadeera Samarawickrama 82 (122); Kuldeep Yadav 3/25 (10 overs) |

Sri Lanka Under-19s won by 5 wickets
Sheikh Zayed Stadium, Abu Dhabi
Umpires: Chris Gaffaney (NZ) and Shozab Raza (Pak)

- India Under-19s won the toss and elected to bat.

10 February
Scorecard

| Australia; 195 (46.1 overs) | v | Zimbabwe; 196/7 (48.3 overs) |
| Jaron Morgan 36 (41); Deven Bell 3/38 (8 overs) | | Ryan Burl 60 (109); Tom Andrews 2/28 (10 overs) |

Zimbabwe Under-19s won by 3 wickets
Sheikh Zayed Stadium Nursery 1, Abu Dhabi
Umpires: Ranmore Martinesz (SL) and David Odhiambo (Ken)

- Australia Under-19s won the toss and elected to bat.

10 February
Scorecard

| Namibia; 204/8 (50 overs) | v | South Africa; 205/5 (47.3 overs) |
| Malan Kruger 58 (83); Ngazibini Sigwili 2/27 (10 overs) | | Aiden Markram 53 (57); Marius Delport 1/28 (7.3 overs) |

South Africa Under-19s won by 5 wickets
Sheikh Zayed Stadium Nursery 2, Abu Dhabi
Umpires: Ian Ramage (Sco) and S. Ravi (Ind)

- Namibia Under-19s won the toss and elected to bat.

10 February
Scorecard

| Canada; 119 (45.4 overs) | v | New Zealand; 120/5 (35.5 overs) |
| Nikhil Dutta 40 (104); Henry Collier 2/19 (6.4 overs) | | Ken McClure 59* (103); Nikhil Dutta 2/20 (7 overs) |

New Zealand Under-19s won by 5 wickets
Sharjah Cricket Stadium, Sharjah
Umpires: Shaun George (SA) and Iftikhar Ali (UAE)

- Canada Under-19s won the toss and elected to bat.

10 February
Scorecard

| England; 281/4 (50 overs) | v | Scotland; 128 (39.4 overs) |
| Ben Duckett 92 (68); Chris Sole 2/58 (10 overs) | | Chris Sole 20 (28); Luke Wood 2/18 (8 overs) |

England Under-19s won by 153 runs
ICC Academy, Dubai
Umpires: Akbar Ali (UAE) and Simon Fry (Aus)

- England Under-19s won the toss and elected to bat.

10 February
Scorecard

| Afghanistan; 84 (39.4 overs) | v | West Indies; 85/1 (18.4 overs) |
| Ihsanullah 27 (67); Jerome Jones 3/12 (7 overs) | | Shimron Hetmyer 46 (56); Sharafuddin Ashraf 1/13 (5 overs) |

West Indies Under-19s won by 9 wickets
ICC Academy Ground No. 2, Dubai
Umpires: Enamul Haque (Ban) and Sarika Prasad (Sin)

- West Indies Under-19s won the toss and elected to field.

10 February
Scorecard

| Bangladesh; 281/9 (50 overs) | v | Papua New Guinea; 116 (40.3 overs) |
| Yasir Ali 64 (67); Riley Hekure 3/50 (9 overs) | | Gaudi Toka 35 (95); Mustafizur Rahman 2/10 (5 overs) |

Bangladesh Under-19s won by 165 runs
Dubai International Stadium, Dubai
Umpires: Rob Bailey (Eng) and Jeremiah Matibiri (Zim)

- Bangladesh Under-19s won the toss and elected to bat.

10 February
Scorecard

| United Arab Emirates; 101 (31.3 overs) | v | Pakistan; 102/0 (17 overs) |
| Shorye Chopra 36 (58); Zia-ul-Haq 3/15 (7 overs) | | Sami Aslam 43* (55) |

Pakistan Under-19s won by 10 wickets
7he Sevens Stadium Pitch 2, Dubai
Umpires: Lekhraj (UAE) and Peter Nero (WI)

- United Arab Emirates Under-19s won the toss and elected to bat.

12 February
Scorecard

| England; 218/7 (50 overs) | v | Bangladesh; 220/6 (48.3 overs) |
| Ed Barnard 54 (69); Mehedy Hasan 2/34 (8 overs) | | Shadman Islam 38 (77); Matthew Fisher 2/33 (10 overs) |

Bangladesh Under-19s won by 4 wickets
Sheikh Zayed Stadium, Abu Dhabi
Umpires: Ranmore Martinesz (SL) and Ian Ramage (Sco)

- England Under-19s won the toss and elected to bat.

12 February
Scorecard

| Scotland; 158 (46.1 overs) | v | Afghanistan; 161/7 (41.1 overs) |
| Andrew Umeed 38 (63); Muslim Musa 2/18 (5 overs) | | Hashmatullah Shaidi 63 (87); Chayank Gosain 3/50 (10 overs) |

Afghanistan Under-19s won by 3 wickets
Sheikh Zayed Stadium Nursery 1, Abu Dhabi
Umpires: S. Ravi (Ind) and Shozab Raza (Pak)

- Scotland Under-19s won the toss and elected to bat.

12 February
Scorecard

| Canada; 231/9 (50 overs) | v | Papua New Guinea; 159/9 (50 overs) |
| Nitish Kumar 82 (68); Nosaina Pokana 4/30 (10 overs) | | Tom Willie 45* (88); Keenen Tinto 3/17 (7 overs) |

Canada Under-19s won by 72 runs
Sheikh Zayed Stadium Nursery 2, Abu Dhabi
Umpires: Chris Gaffaney (NZ) and David Odhiambo (Ken)

- Canada Under-19s won the toss and elected to bat.

12 February
Scorecard

| Namibia; 192/8 (50 overs) | v | Sri Lanka; 196/7 (48.5 overs) |
| Jano Coetzee 35 (41); Lakshan Jayasinghe 3/22 (9 overs) | | Tilaksha Sumanasiri 63 (82); Jano Coetzee 2/19 (5 overs) |

Sri Lanka Under-19s won by 3 wickets
Sharjah Cricket Stadium, Sharjah
Umpires: Simon Fry (Aus) and Sarika Prasad (Sin)

- Namibia Under-19s won the toss and elected to bat.

12 February
Scorecard

| India; 234/6 (50 overs) | v | South Africa; 235/5 (43.3 overs) |
| Vijay Zol 59 (99); Kagiso Rabada 2/18 (5 overs) | | Clyde Fortuin 112* (112); Kuldeep Yadav 2/38 (10 overs) |

South Africa Under-19s won by 5 wickets
ICC Academy, Dubai
Umpires: Rob Bailey (Eng) and Shabbir Ali (UAE)

- South Africa Under-19s won the toss and elected to field.

12 February
Scorecard

| Pakistan; 179 (45 overs) | v | Australia; 141 (44.3 overs) |
| Imam-ul-Haq 31 (61); Tom Andrews 3/32 (10 overs) | | Alex Gregory 37 (85); Karamat Ali 2/17 (9.3 overs) |

Pakistan Under-19s won by 38 runs
ICC Academy Ground No. 2, Dubai
Umpires: Shaun George (SA) and Jeremiah Matibiri (Zim)

- Pakistan Under-19s won the toss and elected to bat.

12 February
Scorecard

| Zimbabwe; 100 (39.1 overs) | v | United Arab Emirates; 101/4 (29.5 overs) |
| Charles Kunje 36 (100); Moaaz Qazi 3/13 (7.1 overs) | | Shorye Chopra 37 (53); Patrick Mambo 2/7 (6.5 overs) |

United Arab Emirates Under-19s won by 6 wickets
7he Sevens Stadium, Dubai
Umpires: Akbar Ali (UAE) and Peter Nero (WI)

- United Arab Emirates Under-19s won the toss and elected to field.

12 February
Scorecard

| New Zealand; 147 (45.2 overs) | v | West Indies; 151/4 (37.2 overs) |
| Robert O'Donnell 31 (63); Bryan Charles 2/9 (4.2 overs) | | Tagenarine Chanderpaul 62* (89); Kyle Jamieson 2/35 (7 overs) |

West Indies Under-19s won by 6 wickets
7he Sevens Stadium Pitch 2, Dubai
Umpires: Enamul Haque (Ban) and Lekhraj (UAE)

- West Indies Under-19s won the toss and elected to field.

=== Group stage ===
- The top 2 teams from each group qualified for the knock-out rounds of the tournament.
- The bottom 2 teams from each group took part in the Plate competition knock-out.

==== Group A ====
| Pos | Team | Pld | W | L | T | NR | Pts | NRR |
|---|---|---|---|---|---|---|---|---|
| 1 | India | 3 | 3 | 0 | 0 | 0 | 6 | 2.907 |
| 2 | Pakistan | 3 | 2 | 1 | 0 | 0 | 4 | 1.673 |
| 3 | Scotland | 3 | 1 | 2 | 0 | 0 | 2 | −1.371 |
| 4 | Papua New Guinea | 3 | 0 | 3 | 0 | 0 | 0 | −3.339 |

15 February
09:30
Scorecard

| India; 262/7 (50 overs) | v | Pakistan; 222 (48.4 overs) |
| Sarfaraz Khan 74 (78); Irfanullah Shah 2/32 (10 overs) | | Sami Aslam 64 (85); Deepak Hooda 5/41 (10 overs) |

India Under-19s won by 40 runs
Dubai International Stadium, Dubai
Umpires: Simon Fry (Aus) and Peter Nero (WI)
Player of the match: Sarfaraz Khan (Ind)

- India Under-19s won the toss and elected to bat.

15 February
09:30
Scorecard

| Papua New Guinea; 108 (36.3 overs) | v | Scotland; 110/4 (29.4 overs) |
| Kiplin Doriga 19 (23); Ross McLean 3/15 (6 overs) | | Zander Muir 39* (64); Alei Nao 2/28 (8 overs) |

Scotland Under-19s won by 6 wickets
ICC Academy, Dubai
Umpires: Rob Bailey (Eng) and Sarika Prasad (Sin)
Player of the match: Zander Muir (Sco)

- Papua New Guinea Under-19s won the toss and elected to bat.

17 February
09:30
Scorecard

| Scotland; 88 (29.4 overs) | v | India; 92/5 (22.3 overs) |
| Andrew Umeed 44 (77); Aamir Gani 4/28 (9.4 overs) | | Sarfaraz Khan 45* (51); Chayank Gosain 3/31 (10 overs) |

India Under-19s won by 5 wickets
Dubai International Stadium, Dubai
Umpires: Rob Bailey (Eng) and Enamul Haque (Ban)
Player of the match: Kuldeep Yadav (Ind)

- Scotland Under-19s won the toss and elected to bat.
- Kuldeep Yadav (India Under-19s) took a hat-trick.

17 February
09:30
Scorecard

| Pakistan; 283/8 (50 overs) | v | Papua New Guinea; 138 (30.5 overs) |
| Imam-ul-Haq 88 (117); Kabua Morea 3/45 (10 overs) | | Kiplin Doriga 51 (56); Zafar Gohar 4/35 (8.5 overs) |

Pakistan Under-19s won by 145 runs
ICC Academy, Dubai
Umpires: Shaun George (SA) and Jeremiah Matibiri (Zim)
Player of the match: Imam-ul-Haq (Pak)

- Papua New Guinea Under-19s won the toss and elected to field.

19 February
09:30
Scorecard

| India; 301/6 (50 overs) | v | Papua New Guinea; 56 (28.2 overs) |
| Sanju Samson 85 (48); Alei Nao 3/45 (10 overs) | | Riley Hekure 20 (46); Kuldeep Yadav 4/10 (8.2 overs) |

India Under-19s won by 245 runs
Sharjah Cricket Stadium, Sharjah
Umpires: Enamul Haque (Ban) and Peter Nero (WI)
Player of the match: Sanju Samson (Ind)

- India Under-19s won the toss and elected to bat.

19 February
09:30
Scorecard

| Pakistan; 308/7 (50 overs) | v | Scotland; 162 (39.5 overs) |
| Imam-ul-Haq 133 (137); Chris Sole 3/69 (10 overs) | | Andrew Umeed 65 (100); Karamat Ali 5/36 (7.5 overs) |

Pakistan Under-19s won by 146 runs
ICC Academy Ground No. 2, Dubai
Umpires: Simon Fry (Aus) and Sarika Prasad (Sin)
Player of the match: Imam-ul-Haq (Pak)

- Pakistan Under-19s won the toss and elected to bat.

==== Group B ====
| Pos | Team | Pld | W | L | T | NR | Pts | NRR |
|---|---|---|---|---|---|---|---|---|
| 1 | Australia | 3 | 2 | 1 | 0 | 0 | 4 | 0.927 |
| 2 | Afghanistan | 3 | 2 | 1 | 0 | 0 | 4 | 0.881 |
| 3 | Bangladesh | 3 | 2 | 1 | 0 | 0 | 4 | 0.097 |
| 4 | Namibia | 3 | 0 | 3 | 0 | 0 | 0 | −1.920 |

15 February
09:30
Scorecard

| Afghanistan; 212 (50 overs) | v | Bangladesh; 216/0 (42.3 overs) |
| Mohammad Mujtaba 47 (62); Mosaddek Hossain 3/19 (10 overs) | | Shadman Islam 126* (142) |

Bangladesh Under-19s won by 10 wickets
Sheikh Zayed Stadium Nursery 2, Abu Dhabi
Umpires: David Odhiambo (Ken) and S. Ravi (Ind)
Player of the match: Shadman Islam (Ban)

- Bangladesh Under-19s won the toss and elected to field.

15 February
09:30
Scorecard

| Australia; 242/7 (50 overs) | v | Namibia; 141 (44.2 overs) |
| Matthew Short 96 (138); Bredell Wessels 4/50 (10 overs) | | Bredell Wessels 43 (56); Matthew Fotia 3/23 (7.2 overs) |

Australia Under-19s won by 101 runs
Sheikh Zayed Stadium, Abu Dhabi
Umpires: Chris Gaffaney (NZ) and Shozab Raza (Pak)
Player of the match: Matthew Short (Aus)

- Australia Under-19s won the toss and elected to bat.

17 February
09:30
Scorecard

| Afghanistan; 253 (49.2 overs) | v | Australia; 217 (48.0 overs) |
| Mohammad Mujtaba 75 (102); Cameron Valente 3/59 (10 overs) | | James Bazley 54 (36); Abdullah Adil 4/45 (9 overs) |

Afghanistan Under-19s won by 36 runs
Sheikh Zayed Stadium Nursery 2, Abu Dhabi
Umpires: Chris Gaffaney (NZ) and Shozab Raza (Pak)
Player of the match: Mohammad Mujtaba (Afg)

- Afghanistan Under-19s won the toss and elected to bat.

17 February
09:30
Scorecard

| Bangladesh; 233/5 (50 overs) | v | Namibia; 181 (49 overs) |
| Mosaddek Hossain 70* (87); Jano Coetzee 2/29 (6 overs) | | Xander Pitchers 40 (72); Mustafizur Rahman 3/24 (10 overs) |

Bangladesh Under-19s won by 52 runs
Sheikh Zayed Stadium Nursery 1, Abu Dhabi
Umpires: David Odhiambo (Ken) and S. Ravi (Ind)
Player of the match: Mosaddek Hossain (Ban)

- Bangladesh Under-19s won the toss and elected to bat.

19 February
09:30
Scorecard

| Australia; 244/6 (50 overs) | v | Bangladesh; 170 (42 overs) |
| Jake Doran 99* (124); Nihaduzzaman 2/32 (10 overs) | | Shadman Islam 49 (81); Ben Ashkenazi 3/33 (8 overs) |

Australia Under-19s won by 74 runs
Sheikh Zayed Stadium, Abu Dhabi
Umpires: Chris Gaffaney (NZ) and Ranmore Martinesz (SL)
Player of the match: Jake Doran (Aus)

- Bangladesh Under-19s won the toss and elected to field.

19 February
09:30
Scorecard

| Namibia; 192/9 (50 overs) | v | Afghanistan; 196/6 (25.3 overs) |
| Gerhard Erasmus 84 (119); Muslim Musa 3/35 (10 overs) | | Hashmatullah Shaidi 52 (43); Bredell Wessels 4/58 (9.3 overs) |

Afghanistan Under-19s won by 4 wickets
Sheikh Zayed Stadium Nursery 2, Abu Dhabi
Umpires: Ian Ramage (Sco) and S. Ravi (Ind)
Player of the match: Mohammad Mujtaba (Afg)

- Namibia Under-19s won the toss and elected to bat.

==== Group C ====
| Pos | Team | Pld | W | L | T | NR | Pts | NRR |
|---|---|---|---|---|---|---|---|---|
| 1 | South Africa | 3 | 3 | 0 | 0 | 0 | 6 | 1.297 |
| 2 | West Indies | 3 | 2 | 1 | 0 | 0 | 4 | 0.907 |
| 3 | Zimbabwe | 3 | 1 | 2 | 0 | 0 | 2 | −1.308 |
| 4 | Canada | 3 | 0 | 3 | 0 | 0 | 0 | −0.962 |

14 February
09:30
Scorecard

| Canada; 192/9 (50 overs) | v | Zimbabwe; 195/4 (43.5 overs) |
| Nikhil Dutta 56 (97); Tinashe Kamunhukamwe 3/17 (4 overs) | | Joylord Gumbie 49 (63); Nikhil Dutta 1/22 (10 overs) |

Zimbabwe Under-19s won by 6 wickets
Sheikh Zayed Stadium Nursery 1, Abu Dhabi
Umpires: Ranmore Martinesz (SL) and David Odhiambo (Ken)
Player of the match: Tinashe Kamunhukamwe (Zim)

- Zimbabwe Under-19s won the toss and elected to field.

14 February
09:30
Scorecard

| South Africa; 198/9 (50 overs) | v | West Indies; 104 (35.2 overs) |
| Yaseen Valli 53 (57); Ramaal Lewis 2/44 (10 overs) | | Ramaal Lewis 37 (59); Kagiso Rabada 3/14 (8 overs) |

South Africa Under-19s won by 94 runs
Dubai International Stadium, Dubai
Umpires: Rob Bailey (Eng) and Enamul Haque (Ban)
Player of the match: Justin Dill (SA)

- West Indies Under-19s won the toss and elected to field.

16 February
09:30
Scorecard

| West Indies; 275/6 (50 overs) | v | Zimbabwe; 108 (39.4 overs) |
| Tagenarine Chanderpaul 84* (135); Malcolm Lake 2/43 (6 overs) | | Kieran Geyle 45* (63); Preston McSween 3/14 (7 overs) |

West Indies Under-19s won by 167 runs
Sheikh Zayed Stadium, Abu Dhabi
Umpires: Ranmore Martinesz (SL) and Shozab Raza (Pak)
Player of the match: Tagenarine Chanderpaul (WI)

- West Indies Under-19s won the toss and elected to bat.

16 February
09:30
Scorecard

| South Africa; 293/6 (50 overs) | v | Canada; 248/8 (50 overs) |
| Yaseen Valli 102* (92); Nikhil Dutta 3/54 (10 overs) | | Sudeepta Aurka 69 (100); Yaseen Valli 4/43 (10 overs) |

South Africa Under-19s won by 45 runs
Sheikh Zayed Stadium Nursery 1, Abu Dhabi
Umpires: Chris Gaffaney (NZ) and Ian Ramage (Sco)
Player of the match: Yaseen Valli (SA)

- Canada Under-19s won the toss and elected to field.

18 February
09:30
Scorecard

| West Indies; 289/4 (50 overs) | v | Canada; 226 (49.3 overs) |
| Tagenarine Chanderpaul 93 (127); Keenen Tinto 2/64 (10 overs) | | Nikhil Dutta 62 (107); Ray Jordan 2/44 (9.3 overs) |

West Indies Under-19s won by 63 runs
Sheikh Zayed Stadium Nursery 1, Abu Dhabi
Umpires: David Odhiambo (Ken) and Shozab Raza (Pak)
Player of the match: Tagenarine Chanderpaul (WI)

- West Indies Under-19s won the toss and elected to bat.

18 February
09:30
Scorecard

| Zimbabwe; 198 (50 overs) | v | South Africa; 199/3 (39 overs) |
| Luke Jongwe 55 (53); Justin Dill 4/35 (10 overs) | | Aiden Markram 120* (119); Herbert Chikomba 2/44 (9 overs) |

South Africa Under-19s won by 7 wickets
Sheikh Zayed Stadium, Abu Dhabi
Umpires: Ranmore Martinesz (SL) and Ian Ramage (Sco)
Player of the match: Aiden Markram (SA)

- Zimbabwe Under-19s won the toss and elected to bat.

==== Group D ====
| Pos | Team | Pld | W | L | T | NR | Pts | NRR |
|---|---|---|---|---|---|---|---|---|
| 1 | Sri Lanka | 3 | 3 | 0 | 0 | 0 | 6 | 0.607 |
| 2 | England | 3 | 2 | 1 | 0 | 0 | 4 | 2.157 |
| 3 | New Zealand | 3 | 1 | 2 | 0 | 0 | 2 | −0.347 |
| 4 | United Arab Emirates | 3 | 0 | 3 | 0 | 0 | 0 | −2.429 |

14 February
09:30
Scorecard

| England; 315/8 (50 overs) | v | United Arab Emirates; 102 (33 overs) |
| Ed Barnard 93 (73); Pankaj Prakash 3/72 (9 overs) | | Rohit Singh 38 (48); Will Rhodes 3/14 (7 overs) |

England Under-19s won by 213 runs
Sheikh Zayed Stadium, Abu Dhabi
Umpires: Ian Ramage (Sco) and S. Ravi (Ind)
Player of the match: Ed Barnard (Eng)

- United Arab Emirates Under-19s won the toss and elected to field.

14 February
09:30
Scorecard

| Sri Lanka; 275/9 (50 overs) | v | New Zealand; 226/8 (50 overs) |
| Kusal Mendis 91 (107); Kyle Jamieson 4/49 (9 overs) | | Robert O'Donnell 43 (49); Lakshan Jayasinghe 2/32 (9 overs) |

Sri Lanka Under-19s won by 49 runs
Sharjah Cricket Stadium, Sharjah
Umpires: Shaun George (SA) and Jeremiah Matibiri (Zim)
Player of the match: Kusal Mendis (SL)

- New Zealand Under-19s won the toss and elected to field.

16 February
09:30
Scorecard

| England; 230/9 (50 overs) | v | Sri Lanka; 231/9 (48.5 overs) |
| Jonny Tattersall 95 (120); Anuk Fernando 3/49 (10 overs) | | Sadeera Samarawickrama 82 (89); Rob Sayer 2/33 (10 overs) |

Sri Lanka Under-19s won by 1 wicket
Dubai International Stadium, Dubai
Umpires: Simon Fry (Aus) and Shaun George (SA)
Player of the match: Sadeera Samarawickrama (SL)

- Sri Lanka Under-19s won the toss and elected to field.

16 February
09:30
Scorecard

| New Zealand; 281/5 (50 overs) | v | United Arab Emirates; 169 (49.4 overs) |
| Robert O'Donnell 107* (117); Moaaz Qazi 2/50 (8.5 overs) | | Chirag Suri 57 (77); Jack Hunter 3/32 (9.4 overs) |

New Zealand Under-19s won by 112 runs
Sharjah Cricket Stadium, Sharjah
Umpires: Peter Nero (WI) and Sarika Prasad (Sin)
Player of the match: Robert O'Donnell (NZ)

- New Zealand Under-19s won the toss and elected to bat.

18 February
09:30
Scorecard

| England; 229/8 (50 overs) | v | New Zealand; 114 (36.1 overs) |
| Ryan Higgins 83 (123); Brett Randell 3/57 (10 overs) | | Raki Weerasundara 41 (62); Matthew Fisher 3/18 (6.1 overs) |

England Under-19s won by 115 runs
Dubai International Stadium, Dubai
Umpires: Enamul Haque (Ban) and Shaun George (SA)
Player of the match: Matthew Fisher (Eng)

- England Under-19s won the toss and elected to bat.

18 February
09:30
Scorecard

| United Arab Emirates; 205 (47.5 overs) | v | Sri Lanka; 206/2 (43.1 overs) |
| Shorye Chopra 69 (77); Binura Fernando 2/38 (6.5 overs) | | Hashan Dumindu 113* (118); Pankaj Prakash 1/22 (7 overs) |

Sri Lanka Under-19s won by 8 wickets
Sharjah Cricket Stadium, Sharjah
Umpires: Rob Bailey (Eng) and Jeremiah Matibiri (Zim)
Player of the match: Hashan Dumindu (SL)

- United Arab Emirates Under-19s won the toss and elected to bat.

== Knockout stages ==
=== Plate championship ===
9th place play-off quarter-finals
22 Feb – Sheikh Zayed Stadium
Canada | 75
Bangladesh | 76/1
22 Feb – Sheikh Zayed Stadium Nursery 2
Namibia | 194/8
Zimbabwe | 197/4
23 Feb – Sheikh Zayed Stadium Nursery 1
Papua New Guinea | 186
New Zealand | 190/4
23 Feb – Sheikh Zayed Stadium
Scotland | 119
United Arab Emirates | 124/3

9th place play-off semi-finals
25 Feb – Sheikh Zayed Stadium Nursery 1
Bangladesh | 265/6
Zimbabwe | 193/9
25 Feb – Sheikh Zayed Stadium
New Zealand | 141/5
United Arab Emirates | 140

9th place play-off
27 Feb – Sheikh Zayed Stadium
Bangladesh | 223
New Zealand | 146/9
11th place play-off
27 Feb – Sheikh Zayed Stadium Nursery 1
Zimbabwe | 205
United Arab Emirates | 121/9

Quarter-finals

13th place play-off semi-finals
24 Feb – ICC Academy
Canada | 240
Namibia | 263/9
24 Feb – Sheikh Zayed Stadium Nursery 1
Papua New Guinea | 132
Scotland | 209

13th place play-off
26 Feb – Sheikh Zayed Stadium
Namibia | 173
Scotland | 178
15th place play-off
26 Feb – Sheikh Zayed Stadium Nursery 2
Canada | 169
Papua New Guinea | 158

==== 9th place play-off quarter-finals ====
22 February
09:30
Scorecard

| Canada; 75 (27.1 overs) | v | Bangladesh; 76/1 (13.1 overs) |
| Keenen Tinto 16 (29); Mustafizur Rahman 3/11 (6 overs) | | Shadman Islam 35* (40); Armaan Kapoor 1/2 (1.5 overs) |

Bangladesh Under-19s won by 9 wickets
Sheikh Zayed Stadium, Abu Dhabi
Umpires: Jeremiah Matibiri (Zim) and Ian Ramage (Sco)
Player of the match: Mustafizur Rahman (Ban)

- Bangladesh Under-19s won the toss and elected to field.

22 February
09:30
Scorecard

| Namibia; 194/8 (50 overs) | v | Zimbabwe; 197/4 (45.1 overs) |
| Xander Pitchers 78 (116); Patrick Mambo 4/31 (7 overs) | | Ryan Burl 55* (101); Marius Delport 2/23 (7 overs) |

Zimbabwe Under-19s won by 6 wickets
Sheikh Zayed Stadium Nursery 2, Abu Dhabi
Umpires: Peter Nero (WI) and David Odhiambo (Ken)
Player of the match: Patrick Mambo (Zim)

- Zimbabwe Under-19s won the toss and elected to field.

23 February
09:30
Scorecard

| Papua New Guinea; 186 (48.3 overs) | v | New Zealand; 190/4 (46.4 overs) |
| Kiplin Doriga 50 (102); Raki Weerasundara 3/23 (5 overs) | | Robert O'Donnell 57* (58); Nosaina Pokana 1/36 (8 overs) |

New Zealand Under-19s won by 6 wickets
Sheikh Zayed Stadium Nursery 1, Abu Dhabi
Umpires: Ian Ramage (Sco) and Shozab Raza (Pak)
Player of the match: Robert O'Donnell (NZ)

- Papua New Guinea Under 19s won the toss and elected to bat.

23 February
09:30
Scorecard

| Scotland; 119 (37.4 overs) | v | United Arab Emirates; 124/3 (32.1 overs) |
| Andrew Umeed 23 (30); Omer Mohammed 4/24 (10 overs) | | Shiv Mehra 41 (73); Abdul Sabri 2/31 (6 overs) |

United Arab Emirates Under-19s won by 7 wickets
Sheikh Zayed Stadium, Abu Dhabi
Umpires: Peter Nero (WI) and Sarika Prasad (Sin)
Player of the match: Omer Mohammed (UAE)

- United Arab Emirates Under 19s won the toss and elected to field.

==== 9th place play-off semi-finals ====
25 February
09:30
Scorecard

| Bangladesh; 265/6 (50 overs) | v | Zimbabwe; 193/9 (50 overs) |
| Mosaddek Hossain 83* (66); Patrick Mambo 2/55 (9 overs) | | Luke Jongwe 50 (74); Mehedy Hasan 3/43 (10 overs) |

Bangladesh Under-19s won by 72 runs
Sheikh Zayed Stadium Nursery 1, Abu Dhabi
Umpires: Peter Nero (WI) and Shozab Raza (Pak)
Player of the match: Mosaddek Hossain (Ban)

- Bangladesh Under-19s won the toss and elected to bat.

25 February
09:30
Scorecard

| United Arab Emirates; 140 (49.2 overs) | v | New Zealand; 141/5 (30.2 overs) |
| Moaaz Qazi 21(49); Josh Finnie 2/5 (3 overs) | | Ken McClure 62* (68); Justin James 2/38 (10 overs) |

New Zealand Under-19s won by 5 wickets
Sheikh Zayed Stadium, Abu Dhabi
Umpires: Sarika Prasad (Sin) and Ian Ramage (Sco)
Player of the match: Ken McClure (NZ)

- New Zealand Under-19s won the toss and elected to field.

==== 13th place play-off semi-finals ====
24 February
09:30
Scorecard

| Namibia; 263/9 (50 overs) | v | Canada; 240 (47.3 overs) |
| Jano Coetzee 73 (50); Nitish Kumar 2/44 (10 overs) | | Yug Rao 66 (93); Jano Coetzee 3/37 (8 overs) |

Namibia Under-19s won by 23 runs
ICC Academy Ground No. 2, Dubai
Umpires: Ian Ramage (Sco) and Shozab Raza (Pak)
Player of the match: Jano Coetzee (Nam)

- Namibia Under-19s won the toss and elected to bat.

24 February
09:30
Scorecard

| Scotland; 209 (48.3 overs) | v | Papua New Guinea; 132 (43.3 overs) |
| Michael English 72 (123); Nosaina Pokana 3/27 (10 overs) | | Riley Hekure 26 (44); Mark Watt 3/26 (10 overs) |

Scotland Under-19s won by 77 runs
Sheikh Zayed Stadium Nursery 1, Abu Dhabi
Umpires: Peter Nero (WI) and Sarika Prasad (Sin)
Player of the match: Michael English (Sco)

- Scotland Under-19s won the toss and elected to bat.

==== 15th place play-off ====
26 February
09:30
Scorecard

| Canada; 169 (44.1 overs) | v | Papua New Guinea; 158 (48.2 overs) |
| Yug Rao 77 (105); Nosaina Pokana 4/27 (10 overs) | | Dogodo Bau 39* (102); Farhan Malik 3/20 (10 overs) |

Canada Under-19s won by 11 runs
Sheikh Zayed Stadium Nursery 2, Abu Dhabi
Umpires: David Odhiambo (Ken) and Shozab Raza (Pak)
Player of the match: Yug Rao (Can)

- Canada Under-19s won the toss and elected to bat.

==== 13th place play-off ====
26 February
09:30
Scorecard

| Scotland; 178 (43.4 overs) | v | Namibia; 173 (45.1 overs) |
| Alex Baum 36 (33); Kobus Brand 2/24 (8 overs) | | Joshuan Julius 32 (64); Nick Farrar 3/33 (6 overs) |

Scotland Under-19s won by 5 runs
Sheikh Zayed Stadium, Abu Dhabi
Umpires: Jeremiah Matibiri (Zim) and Sarika Prasad (Sin)
Player of the match: Nick Farrar (Sco)

- Scotland Under-19s won the toss and elected to bat.

==== 11th place play-off ====
27 February
09:30
Scorecard

| Zimbabwe; 205 (50 overs) | v | United Arab Emirates; 121/9 (50 overs) |
| Luke Jongwe 80 (111); Moaaz Qazi 3/35 (10 overs) | | Rohit Singh 30 (67); Kieran Geyle 3/20 (10 overs) |

Zimbabwe Under-19s won by 84 runs
Sheikh Zayed Stadium Nursery 1, Abu Dhabi
Umpires: Sarika Prasad (Sin) and Shozab Raza (Pak)
Player of the match: Luke Jongwe (Zim)

- Zimbabwe Under-19s won the toss and elected to bat.

==== 9th place play-off ====
27 February
09:30
Scorecard

| Bangladesh; 223 (47 overs) | v | New Zealand; 146/9 (50 overs) |
| Shadman Islam 97 (113); Brett Randell 2/22 (8 overs) | | Brett Randell 51* (68); Mosaddek Hossain 4/23 (10 overs) |

Bangladesh Under-19s won by 77 runs
Sheikh Zayed Stadium, Abu Dhabi
Umpires: Peter Nero (WI) and Ian Ramage (Sco)
Player of the match: Shadman Islam (Ban)

- New Zealand Under-19s won the toss and elected to field.

=== Super league ===
Quarter-finals
22 Feb – Dubai Stadium
India | 221/8
England | 222/7
22 Feb – Sharjah Cricket Stadium
Pakistan | 279/9
Sri Lanka | 158
23 Feb – Dubai Stadium
Afghanistan | 197
South Africa | 198/1
23 Feb – Dubai Stadium
West Indies | 208
Australia | 209/5

Semi-finals
24 Feb – Dubai Stadium
England | 204/7
Pakistan | 205/7
26 Feb – Dubai Stadium
South Africa | 230/9
Australia | 150

Final
1 Mar – Dubai Stadium
Pakistan | 131
South Africa | 134/4
3rd place play-off
28 Feb – ICC Academy
England | 247/9
Australia | 246/7

Quarter-finals

5th place play-off semi-finals
24 Feb – ICC Academy
India | 291/7
Sri Lanka | 215
25 Feb – ICC Academy Ground No. 2
Afghanistan | 206
West Indies | 215

5th place play-off
27 Feb – Sharjah Cricket Stadium
India | 340/8
West Indies | 294/8
7th place play-off
27 Feb – ICC Academy Ground No. 2
Sri Lanka | 114
Afghanistan | 118/5

==== Quarter-finals ====
22 February
09:30
Scorecard

| India; 221/8 (50 overs) | v | England; 222/7 (49.1 overs) |
| Deepak Hooda 68 (99); Matthew Fisher 3/55 (10 overs) | | Ben Duckett 61 (64); Kuldeep Yadav 3/46 (10 overs) |

England Under-19s won by 3 wickets
Dubai International Stadium, Dubai
Umpires: Chris Gaffaney (NZ) and Ranmore Martinesz (SL)
Player of the match: Ben Duckett (Eng)

- India Under-19s won the toss and elected to bat.

22 February
09:30
Scorecard

| Pakistan; 279/9 (50 Overs) | v | Sri Lanka; 158 (42.3 overs) |
| Sami Aslam 95 (121); Binura Fernando 4/56 (9 overs) | | Priyamal Perera 68 (81); Kamran Ghulam 2/19 (6.3 overs) |

Pakistan Under-19s won by 121 runs
Sharjah Cricket Stadium, Sharjah
Umpires: Shaun George (SA) and S. Ravi (Ind)
Player of the match: Sami Aslam (Pak)

- Pakistan Under-19s won the toss and elected to bat.

23 February
09:30
Scorecard

| Afghanistan; 197 (49.5 overs) | v | South Africa; 198/1 (39.2 overs) |
| Nasir Ahmadzai 61 (98); Justin Dill 4/40 (8.5 overs) | | Aiden Markram 105* (118); Zia-ur-Rehman 1/31 (10 overs) |

South Africa Under-19s won by 9 wickets
Sharjah Cricket Stadium, Sharjah
Umpires: Rob Bailey (Eng) and Simon Fry (Aus)
Player of the match: Aiden Markram (SA)

- Afghanistan Under-19s won the toss and elected to bat.

23 February
09:30
Scorecard

| West Indies; 208 (49.5 overs) | v | Australia; 209/5 (46.4 overs) |
| Nicholas Pooran 143 (160); Guy Walker 3/44 (9.5 overs) | | Jaron Morgan 55 (66); Ray Jordan 2/34 (8.4 overs) |

Australia Under-19s won by 5 wickets
Dubai International Stadium, Dubai
Umpires: Enamul Haque (Ban) and S. Ravi (Ind)
Player of the match: Nicholas Pooran (WI)

- West Indies Under-19s won the toss and elected to bat.

==== Semi-finals ====
24 February
12:00 (D/N)
Scorecard

| England; 204/7 (50 overs) | v | Pakistan; 205/7 (49.1 overs) |
| Will Rhodes 76* (79); Karamat Ali 2/36 (10 overs) | | Saud Shakeel 45 (61); Matthew Fisher 2/21 (10 overs) |

Pakistan Under-19s won by 3 wickets
Dubai International Stadium, Dubai
Umpires: Ranmore Martinesz (SL) and S. Ravi (Ind)
Player of the match: Zafar Gohar (Pak)

- England Under-19s won the toss and elected to bat.

26 February
12:00 (D/N)
Scorecard

| South Africa; 230/9 (50 overs) | v | Australia; 150 (42.2 overs) |
| Clyde Fortuin 74 (92); Matthew Short 2/14 (7 overs) | | Jake Doran 36 (74); Kagiso Rabada 6/25 (8.2 overs) |

South Africa Under-19 won by 80 runs
Dubai International Stadium, Dubai
Umpires: Enamul Haque (Ban) and Chris Gaffaney (NZ)
Player of the match: Kagiso Rabada (SA)

- South Africa Under-19s won the toss and elected to bat.

==== 5th place play-off semi-finals ====
24 February
09:30
Scorecard

| India; 291/7 (50 overs) | v | Sri Lanka; 215 (48.1 overs) |
| Deepak Hooda 76* (56); Hashen Ramanayake 2/46 (10 overs) | | Sadeera Samarawickrama 58 (67); Deepak Hooda 3/31 (10 overs) |

India Under-19s won by 76 runs
ICC Cricket Academy, Dubai
Umpires: Rob Bailey (Eng) and Shaun George (SA)
Player of the match: Deepak Hooda (Ind)

- Sri Lanka Under-19s won the toss and elected to field.

25 February
09:30
Scorecard

| West Indies; 215 (49.2 overs) | v | Afghanistan; 206 (48 overs) |
| Fabian Allen 92 (94); Mohammad Mujtaba 3/46 (10 overs) | | Hashmatullah Shaidi 52* (92); Ray Jordan 3/44 (10 overs) |

West Indies Under-19s won by 9 runs
ICC Academy Ground No. 2, Dubai
Umpires: Simon Fry (Aus) and Ranmore Martinesz (SL)
Player of the match: Fabian Allen (WI)

- West Indies Under-19s won the toss and elected to bat.

==== 7th place play-off ====
27 February
09:30
Scorecard

| Sri Lanka; 114 (34.3 overs) | v | Afghanistan; 118/5 (21.2 overs) |
| Priyamal Perera 30 (36); Usman Ghani 3/21 (6 overs) | | Ihsanullah 37* (41); Anuk Fernando 4/50 (9 overs) |

Afghanistan Under-19s won by 5 wickets
ICC Academy Ground No. 2, Dubai
Umpires: Rob Bailey (Eng) and Enamul Haque (Ban)
Player of the match: Usman Ghani (Afg)

- Sri Lanka Under-19s won the toss and elected to bat.

==== 5th place play-off ====
27 February
09:30
Scorecard

| India; 340/8 (50 overs) | v | West Indies; 294/8 (50 overs) |
| Ankush Bains 74 (68); Gudakesh Motie 3/52 (10 overs) | | Tagenarine Chanderpaul 112 (136); Chama Milind 2/50 (9 overs) |

India Under-19s won by 46 runs
Sharjah Cricket Stadium, Sharjah
Umpires: Simon Fry (Aus) and Shaun George (SA)
Player of the match: Ankush Bains (Ind)

- India Under-19s won the toss and elected to bat.

==== 3rd place play-off ====
28 February
09:30
Scorecard

| Australia; 246/7 (50 overs) | v | England; 247/9 (49.4 overs) |
| Ben McDermott 56* (58); Ed Barnard 3/22 (7 overs) | | Ben Duckett 100 (109); Ben Ashkenazi 3/32 (6 overs) |

England Under-19s won by 1 wicket
ICC Academy, Dubai
Umpires: Chris Gaffaney (NZ) and Shaun George (SA)
Player of the match: Ben Duckett (Eng)

- Australia Under-19s won the toss and elected to bat.

==== Final ====
1 March
12:00 (D/N)
Scorecard

| Pakistan; 131 (44.3 overs) | v | South Africa; 134/4 (42.1 overs) |
| Amad Butt 37* (54); Corbin Bosch 4/15 (7.3 overs) | | Aiden Markram 66* (125); Karamat Ali 2/24 (10 overs) |

South Africa Under-19s won by 6 wickets
Dubai International Stadium, Dubai
Umpires: Ranmore Martinesz (SL) and S. Ravi (Ind)
Player of the match: Corbin Bosch (SA)

- Pakistan Under-19s won the toss and elected to bat.

== Final standings ==
| Position | Team |
|---|---|
| 1 | South Africa |
| 2 | Pakistan |
| 3 | England |
| 4 | Australia |
| 5 | India |
| 6 | West Indies |
| 7 | Afghanistan |
| 8 | Sri Lanka |
| 9 | Bangladesh |
| 10 | New Zealand |
| 11 | Zimbabwe |
| 12 | United Arab Emirates |
| 13 | Scotland |
| 14 | Namibia |
| 15 | Canada |
| 16 | Papua New Guinea |

- Qualified for the next world cup as full members of ICC.
- Top associate team.

== See also ==
- ICC Under-19 Cricket World Cup
- International Cricket Council
