= Malcolm Lake =

Zimbabwean cricketer (born 1994)

Personal information
- Full name: Malcolm Blair Lake
- Born: 3 August 1994 (age 32); Harare, Zimbabwe
- Batting: Left-handed
- Bowling: Right-arm medium
- Source: ESPNcricinfo

Malcolm Lake (born 3 August 1994) is a Zimbabwean first-class cricketer. He was part of Zimbabwe's squad for the 2014 ICC Under-19 Cricket World Cup. In March 2017, he played for Oxford MCCU against Surrey as part of the Marylebone Cricket Club University fixtures.
