= Will Rhodes =

English cricketer (born 1995)

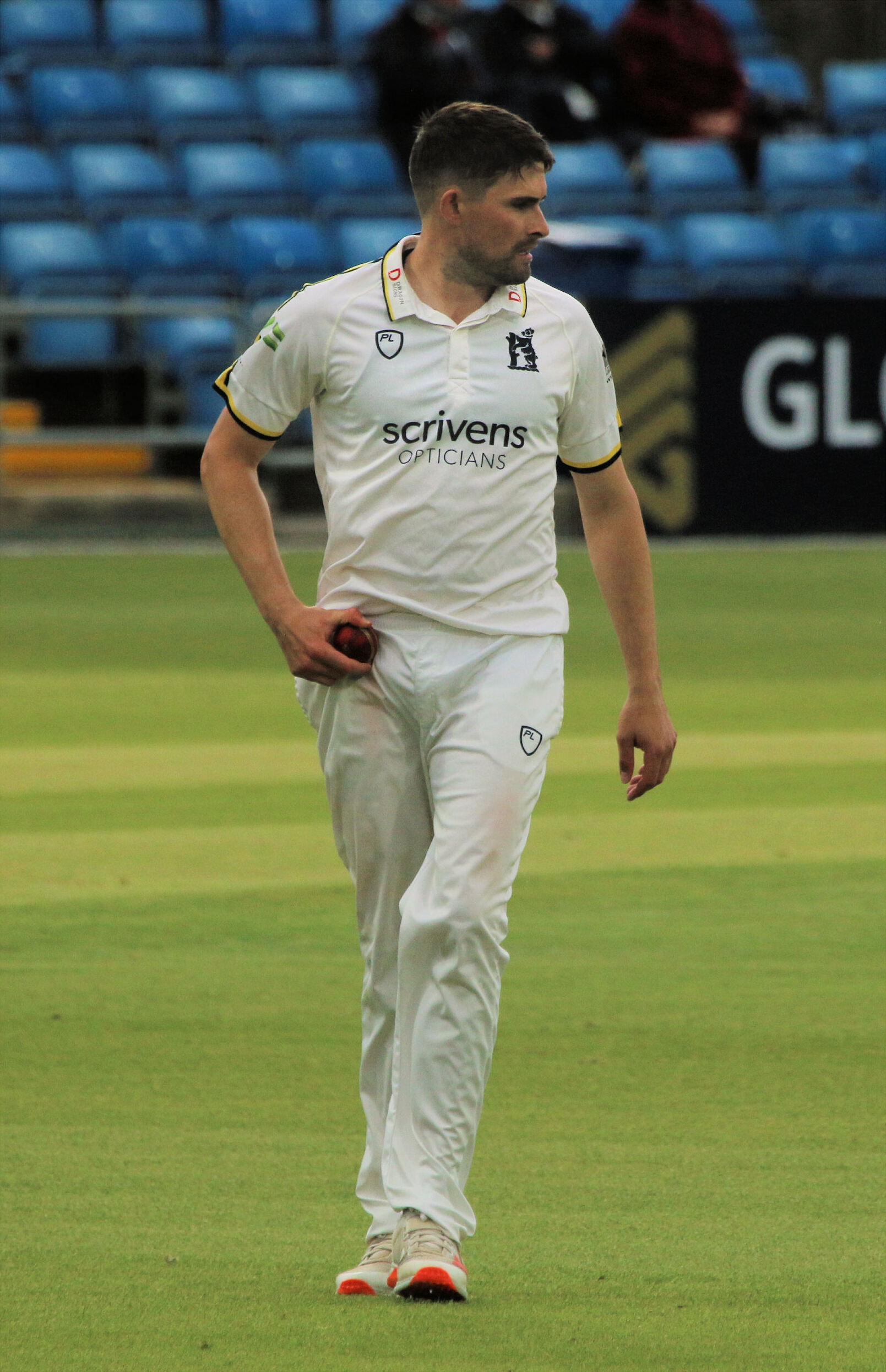
- Rhodes in 2022

Personal information
- Full name: William Michael Harry Rhodes
- Born: 2 March 1995 (age 31); Nottingham, Nottinghamshire, England
- Height: 6 ft 1 in (1.85 m)
- Batting: Left-handed
- Bowling: Right-arm medium-fast
- Role: All-rounder; Club captain

Domestic team information
- Years: Team
- 2013–2017: Yorkshire (squad no. 35)
- 2016: → Essex (on loan)
- 2018–2024: Warwickshire (squad no. 35)
- 2025–2026: Durham (squad no. 15)
- FC debut: 22 March 2015 Yorkshire v MCC
- LA debut: 5 May 2013 Yorkshire v Glamorgan

Career statistics
Competition	FC	LA	T20
Matches	132	84	76
Runs scored	6,986	2,623	1,041
Batting average	34.75	37.47	19.64
100s/50s	13/29	3/14	0/3
Top score	207	148*	79
Balls bowled	8,181	2,175	493
Wickets	116	62	36
Bowling average	36.79	33.77	20.58
5 wickets in innings	2	2	0
10 wickets in match	0	0	0
Best bowling	5/17	5/30	4/34
Catches/stumpings	85/–	38/–	24/–
- Source: Cricinfo, 27 September 2026

William Michael Harry Rhodes (born 2 March 1995) is a cricketer who plays for Durham, having formerly played for Yorkshire, Warwickshire and the England Under-19 cricket team. He is an all-rounder.

Rhodes made both his List A and Twenty20 debuts for Yorkshire during the 2013 English cricket season. In the same year, he also made 102 for England Under 19s against the Pakistan Under-19 cricket team.

Rhodes was the captain of the England Under 19s at the 2014 ICC Under-19 Cricket World Cup held in the United Arab Emirates. He led the England U19s to victory over the tournament favorites, the India U19s, in the quarterfinals. In the semifinals, he rescued his side with an unbeaten 76 n.o. after the team was reduced to 119 for 6 in the 37th over. However, the England U19s lost the semifinal match to the Pakistan U19s in a tight contest. Rhodes nonetheless received praise for his captaincy in that match.

In June 2017, it was announced that Rhodes would join Warwickshire ahead of the 2018 season. In 2020 he was appointed Warwickshire club captain In July 2021, Rhodes was named as the captain of a County Select XI team to play India ahead of their Test series against England. In the 2021 season Will Rhodes led Warwickshire to a domestic double winning the County Championship Title and the Bob Willis Trophy.

Rhodes joined Durham on a three-year contract in September 2024. He extended his contract in August 2026, agreeing a deal tying him into the club until at least the end of the 2028 season.
