= Clyde Fortuin =

South African cricketer (born 1995)

Personal information
- Born: 18 August 1995 (age 31); Cape Town, Western Cape, South Africa
- Batting: Right-handed
- Role: Wicket-keeper

International information
- National side: South Africa
- Test debut (cap 362): 4 February 2024 v New Zealand
- Last Test: 13 February 2024 v New Zealand

Career statistics
Competition	Test	FC	LA	T20
Matches	2	87	67	95
Runs scored	23	3,542	1,170	1,564
Batting average	5.75	27.45	20.89	20.05
100s/50s	0/0	3/20	0/5	1/6
Top score	11	144*	80	104*
Catches/stumpings	3/2	211/24	66/8	50/19
Medal record
Men's Cricket
Representing South Africa
ICC Under-19 Cricket World Cup
Winner	2014 UAE
- Source: ESPNcricinfo, 30 November 2025

Clyde Fortuin (born 18 August 1995) is a South African cricketer. He was part of South Africa's squad for the 2014 ICC Under-19 Cricket World Cup. He was included in the Border cricket team squad for the 2015 Africa T20 Cup. In August 2017, he was named in Bloem City Blazers' squad for the first season of the T20 Global League. However, in October 2017, Cricket South Africa initially postponed the tournament until November 2018, with it being cancelled soon after.

In September 2019, Fortuin was named in Northern Cape's squad for the 2019–20 CSA Provincial T20 Cup. In April 2021, he was named in Boland's squad, ahead of the 2021–22 cricket season in South Africa. On 4 October 2021, in the 2021–22 CSA Provincial T20 Knock-Out tournament, Fortuin scored his first century in Twenty20 cricket, with 104 not out against Warriors.
