= Hashan Dumindu =

Sri Lankan cricketer (born 1995)

Personal information
- Born: 4 July 1995 (age 31); Kelaniya, Sri Lanka
- Batting: Right-handed
- Bowling: Right-arm off-break
- Role: Batter
- Source: ESPNcricinfo

Hashan Dumindu (born 4 July 1995) is a Sri Lankan first-class cricketer. He was part of Sri Lanka's squad for the 2014 ICC Under-19 Cricket World Cup. In November 2021, he was selected to play for the Colombo Stars following the players' draft for the 2021 Lanka Premier League.
