= Jaron Morgan =

Australian cricketer (born 1995)

Personal information
- Born: 27 September 1995 (age 30); Johannesburg, South Africa
- Batting: Left-handed
- Role: Wicket-keeper

Domestic team information
- Years: Team
- 2019/20: Perth Scorchers
- 2019/20: Cricket Australia XI
- Source: Cricinfo, 10 January 2020

Jaron Morgan (born 27 September 1995) is an Australian cricketer. He made his Twenty20 debut on 15 January 2020, for the Perth Scorchers in the 2019–20 Big Bash League season. Prior to his T20 debut, he was named as the captain of Australia's squad for the 2014 Under-19 Cricket World Cup. In January 2020, he was named in the Cricket Australia XI team to face the England Lions.

Born in Johannesburg, Morgan and his family moved to Perth at the age of two.
