= Ben Ashkenazi =

Australian cricketer (born 1994)

Personal information
- Full name: Ben Matthew Ashkenazi
- Born: 5 October 1994 (age 32); Pearcedale, Victoria
- Batting: Right-handed
- Bowling: Right-arm medium
- Source: ESPN Cricinfo, 26 October 2015

Ben Matthew Ashkenazi (born 5 October 1994) is an Australian cricketer. He represented Australia at the 2014 Under-19 Cricket World Cup. He was born in Pearcedale, Australia.
