= Andrew Umeed =

Scottish cricketer (born 1996)

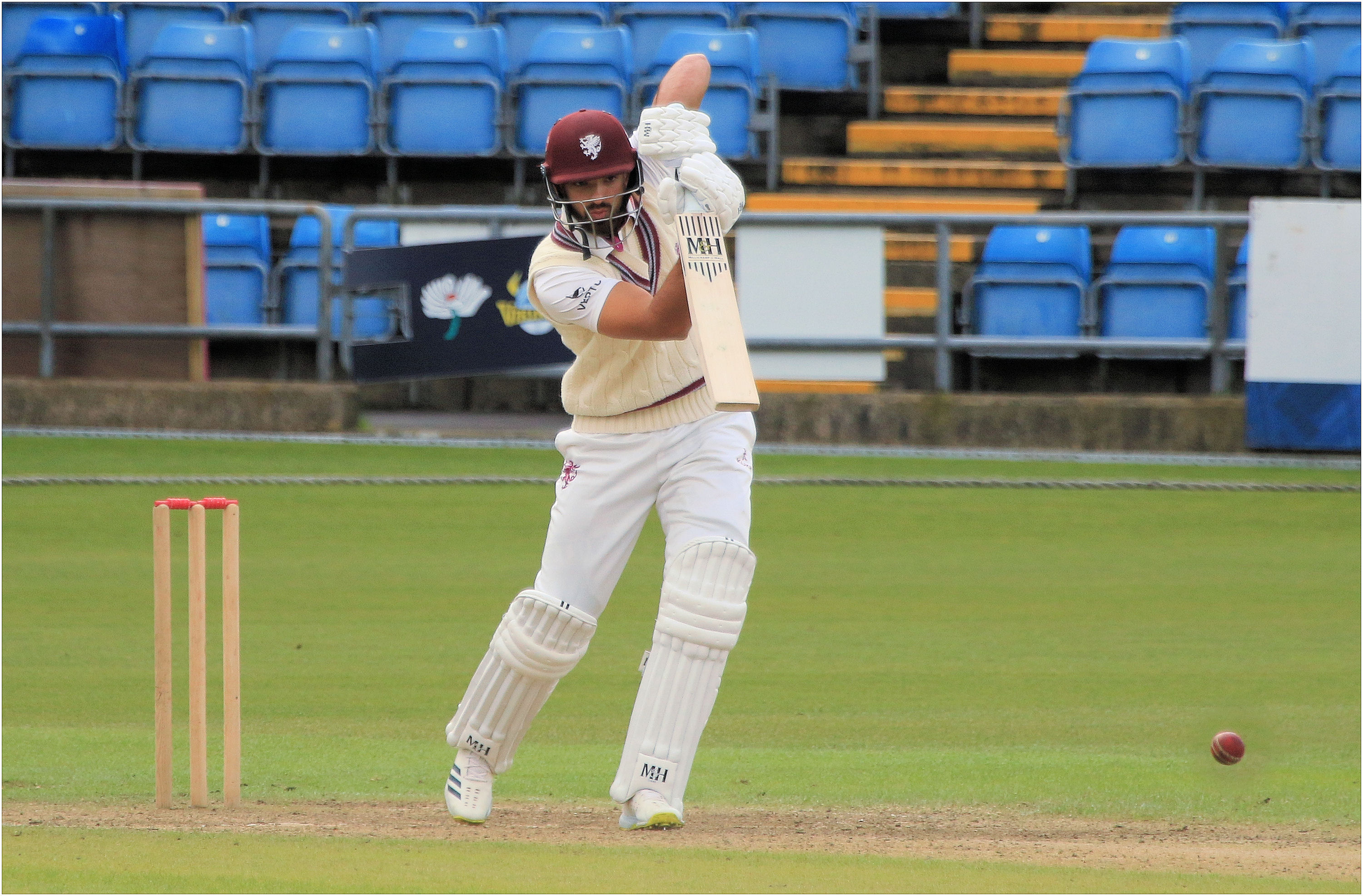
- Umeed in 2024

Personal information
- Full name: Andrew Robert Isaac Umeed
- Born: 19 April 1996 (age 30); Glasgow, Scotland
- Height: 6 ft 0 in (1.83 m)
- Batting: Right-handed
- Bowling: Right-arm leg break
- Role: Batsman

International information
- National side: Scotland (2015–present)
- ODI debut (cap 80): 1 March 2024 v Canada
- Last ODI: 4 November 2024 v Nepal

Domestic team information
- Years: Team
- 2016–2018: Warwickshire (squad no. 23)
- 2022–2025: Somerset (squad no. 1)

Career statistics
Competition	ODI	FC	LA
Matches	5	32	29
Runs scored	138	1,108	1,375
Batting average	46.00	21.30	55.00
100s/50s	0/1	2/2	4/8
Top score	98*	113	172*
Balls bowled	–	325	60
Wickets	–	3	4
Bowling average	–	77.66	9.25
5 wickets in innings	–	0	0
10 wickets in match	–	0	0
Best bowling	–	1/3	3/31
Catches/stumpings	1/–	26/–	9/–
- Source: CricketArchive, 25 May 2025

Andrew Robert Isaac Umeed (born 19 April 1996) is a Scottish first-class cricketer.

== Early life ==
Umeed was born on 19 April 1996 in Glasgow, Scotland to a Pakistani father and Scottish mother.

== Career ==
Umeed made his first-class debut in the 2015–17 ICC Intercontinental Cup against Afghanistan in June 2015. He made his List A debut for Warwickshire against the West Indies A team in a tri-series warm-up match on 17 June 2018. In July 2022, Umeed became the first graduate of the South Asian Cricket Academy to sign a multi-year contract with a county side, after signing with Somerset until the end of 2023.
