= Tom Andrews (cricketer) =

Australian cricketer

Personal information
- Full name: Thomas David Andrews
- Born: 7 October 1994 (age 32); Darwin, Northern Territory, Australia
- Batting: Left-handed
- Bowling: Slow left-arm orthodox
- Role: All-rounder

Domestic team information
- Years: Team
- 2014/15–2019/20: South Australia (squad no. 29)
- 2016/17–2018/19: Adelaide Strikers
- 2019/20–2020/21: Melbourne Renegades
- 2020/21–2022/23: Tasmania
- 2022/23: Hobart Hurricanes
- 2024/25: Sydney Thunder
- FC debut: 2 December 2015 Cricket Australia XI v West Indians
- LA debut: 24 July 2014 National Performance Squad v India A

Career statistics
Competition	FC	LA	T20
Matches	17	36	7
Runs scored	616	148	32
Batting average	26.78	7.04	10.66
100s/50s	1/3	0/0	0/0
Top score	101	15	27
Balls bowled	3,400	1,827	120
Wickets	34	39	2
Bowling average	53.50	42.02	81.00
5 wickets in innings	1	0	0
10 wickets in match	0	0	0
Best bowling	6/40	4/41	2/22
Catches/stumpings	7/–	15/–	1/–
- Source: Cricinfo, 25 October 2024

Thomas David Andrews (born 7 October 1994) is an Australian cricketer. He is an all-rounder who bats left-handed and bowls slow left-arm orthodox deliveries. He plays for Tasmania, having previously played for South Australia, the Adelaide Strikers and the Melbourne Renegades.

== Youth career ==
Born in Darwin, Northern Territory, Andrews started his cricket career playing for the Darwin Eagles. He represented the Northern Territory in both Under-17 and Under-19 National Championships and started playing for South Australia Under-23s in the Futures League in 2012. Andrews also represented Australia at under-19 level, his best performance being a five-wicket haul against Zimbabwe in a thumping 147-run win. In total Andrews played 16 Youth ODIs for Australia, including at the 2014 Under-19 Cricket World Cup, taking 26 wickets.

== Domestic career ==
Andrews made his one-day debut on 24 July 2014 for the Australia National Performance Squad against India A, as part of the Australia A Team Quadrangular Series in 2014. He scored twelve runs and took a wicket. For the 2014–15 summer he was given a rookie contract with South Australia and performed well in both the Futures League and in grade cricket for Woodville Cricket Club. During the grade cricket season he scored 469 runs at a batting average of 52.11 and took 26 wickets at a bowling average of 21.81. Thanks to his form his rookie contract was renewed for the 2015–16 summer.

During the 2015 winter Andrews trained in England with Bashley Rydal on a scholarship. Andrews went on to play his first one-day matches for South Australia in the 2015–16 Matador BBQs One-Day Cup, being included in the state's 14-man squad for the tournament. During the tournament he took 4/41, the best bowling figures for the match, in a big win over Cricket Australia XI that took South Australia into the elimination final. Overall he performed well, taking nine wickets from eight matches, and as a result he was included in the Cricket Australia XI squad to take on the West Indians in their tour of Australia, his first-class debut. His fortunes continued to improve and he made his Sheffield Shield debut for South Australia when their usual spin bowler, Adam Zampa had been selected to play for Australia in the Chappell–Hadlee Trophy, and he impressed with a four-wicket haul. South Australia made it to the Sheffield Shield final, but Andrews wasn't included in the team (he was there as their twelfth man) as they decided to play with four fast bowlers.

After breaking into both the first-class and one-day teams for South Australia, Andrews was upgraded from his rookie contract to a full contract with the team, and rather than going back to England to train he went back to Darwin to play with the Darwin Eagles in the newly formed Darwin and Districts cricket competition. He spent most of the 2016–17 season playing in the Futures League, but was brought into the Adelaide Strikers team as an injury replacement for BBL|06. He made his Twenty20 debut for the Strikers on 31 December 2016. He was brought into South Australia's Sheffield Shield squad for the Sheffield Shield final as a potential second spin bowler because the pitch at Traeger Park in Alice Springs is traditionally a spinner-friendly pitch.
