= Kobus Brand =

Namibian cricketer (born 1994)

Personal information
- Born: 10 June 1994 (age 32); Keetmanshoop, Namibia
- Batting: Left-handed
- Source: ESPNcricinfo

Kobus Brand (born 10 June 1994) is a Namibian first-class cricketer.
