= Kuldeep Yadav =

Indian cricketer (born 1994)

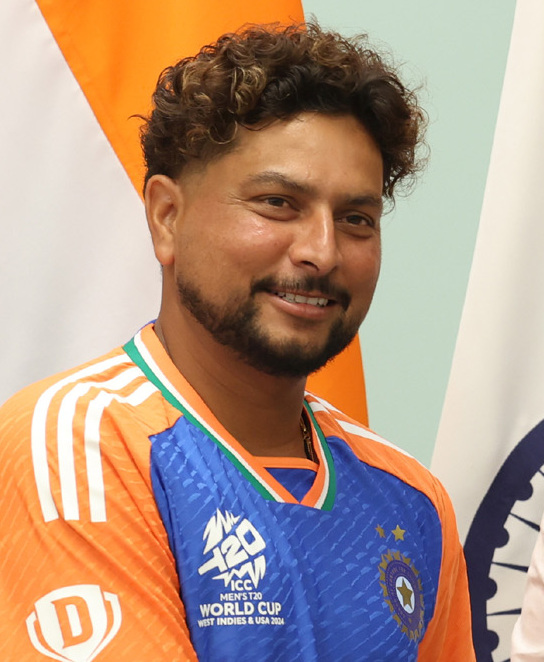
- Yadav in 2024

Personal information
- Born: 14 December 1994 (age 31); Unnao, Uttar Pradesh, India
- Height: 5 ft 6 in (168 cm)
- Batting: Left-handed
- Bowling: Left-arm wrist spin
- Role: Bowler
- Relatives: Vanshika Chadha (m. 2026)

International information
- National side: India (2017–present)
- Test debut (cap 288): 25 March 2017 v Australia
- Last Test: 22 November 2025 v South Africa
- ODI debut (cap 218): 23 June 2017 v West Indies
- Last ODI: 13 November 2026 v New Zealand
- ODI shirt no.: 23
- T20I debut (cap 69): 9 July 2017 v West Indies
- Last T20I: 9 October 2026 v West Indies
- T20I shirt no.: 23

Domestic team information
- Years: Team
- 2009–present: Uttar Pradesh
- 2016–2021: Kolkata Knight Riders
- 2022–2026: Delhi Capitals
- 2026: Yorkshire
- 2027–present: Lucknow Super Giants

Career statistics
| Competition | Test | ODI | T20I | FC |
|---|---|---|---|---|
| Matches | 19 | 125 | 56 | 54 |
| Runs scored | 252 | 216 | 48 | 1,227 |
| Batting average | 12.6 | 9.39 | 8 | 20.11 |
| 100s/50s | 0/0 | 0/0 | 0/0 | 1/6 |
| Top score | 40 | 19 | 23* | 117 |
| Balls bowled | 3,150 | 6,432 | 1,175 | 9,681 |
| Wickets | 80 | 201 | 98 | 199 |
| Bowling average | 23.36 | 27.3 | 14.20 | 29.37 |
| 5 wickets in innings | 5 | 2 | 2 | 10 |
| 10 wickets in match | 0 | 0 | 0 | 1 |
| Best bowling | 5/40 | 6/25 | 5/17 | 6/50 |
| Catches/stumpings | 5/– | 20/– | 14/– | 18/– |
Medal record
Men's cricket
Representing India
ICC Cricket World Cup
| Runner-up | 2023 India |
ICC T20 World Cup
| Winner | 2024 West Indies & USA |
| Winner | 2026 India & Sri Lanka |
ICC Champions Trophy
| Winner | 2025 Pakistan |
ACC Asia Cup
| Winner | 2018 UAE |
| Winner | 2023 Pakistan |
| Winner | 2025 UAE |
ACC U19 Asia Cup
| Winner | 2013-14 UAE |
- Source: ESPNcricinfo, 13 November 2026

Kuldeep Yadav (born 14 December 1994) is an Indian international cricketer. A left-arm unorthodox spinner, he plays for Uttar Pradesh in domestic cricket and Lucknow Super Giants in the Indian Premier League. He was a member of the Indian team that won the 2024 and 2026 T20 World Cups and the 2025 Champions Trophy.

Yadav has played for the Indian Under-19 cricket team and played in the 2014 U19 Cricket World Cup. On 18 December 2019, against the West Indies, he became the first bowler for India to take two hat-tricks in international cricket. On 17 January 2020, in the second ODI against Australia, Yadav became the fastest spin bowler for India, in terms of innings, to take 100 wickets in ODI cricket, in his 58th innings. He helped his national team to win the 2018 Asia Cup as he took the most wickets during the tournament at 10 along with Rashid Khan and Mustafizur Rahman, and being the highest wicket taker for India. He made his international test debut against Australia in Dharamshala on 25 March 2017.

== Early and domestic career ==
Yadav was born in Unnao but raised in Kanpur, Uttar Pradesh, the son of a brick kiln owner. In an interview, he revealed that it was his father who wanted him to continue playing cricket and even took him to a coach. Inspired by bowling greats Wasim Akram and Zaheer Khan, he wanted to become a left-arm seamer. However, given his slight build, his coach insisted on him becoming a wrist-spin bowler as he was impressed with the turn and variations he was providing unknowingly at the trials. Since then, he started following and watching videos of Shane Warne's bowling and made him his role model.

"I keep watching videos of Warne. His grip of the ball, length of deliveries and use of the crease are unbeatable. I try to learn from the footage"

— Kuldeep Yadav in an interview

Yadav also revealed that earlier in his life, there was a dark phase in his life when he thought of giving up cricket and committing suicide, when he was not selected in the Uttar Pradesh’s under-15 team.

Yadav was a member of the Mumbai Indians squad in 2012 and signed up by the Kolkata Knight Riders in 2014, whom he represented at the 2014 Champions League Twenty20.

In January 2018, Yadav was bought back by KKR in the 2018 IPL auction. Four years later, he was bought by Delhi Capitals in the auction for the 2022 season. Yadav won the player-of-the-match award four times, most by any player that season.

=== England ===
In July 2026, Yadav signed a short-term contract with Yorkshire County Cricket Club to play in the One-Day Cup and three rounds of the 2026 County Championship.

== International career ==
Yadav was selected in the Indian cricket team to play against West Indies in October 2014 but did not appear in any match. In February 2017, he was added to India's Test squad for their one-off match against Bangladesh. He made his Test debut for India against Australia on 25 March 2017, at the Dharamshala Cricket Stadium, taking four wickets in the first innings. Yadav is the first left-arm wrist spin bowler to represent India national cricket team in Test cricket. He is also only the third such bowler in Test cricket to take four wickets on debut.

In June 2017, Yadav was named in India's squad for a limited overs tour to the West Indies. He made his One Day International (ODI) debut for India against the West Indies on 23 June 2017. However, during this game, he was unable to bowl a single delivery as the game ended with no result due to rain during the first innings while India was batting. He was ultimately able to bowl in the next match of the series, where he took three wickets. He made his Twenty20 International (T20I) debut for India against the West Indies on 9 July 2017.

On 21 September 2017, Yadav became the third bowler for India to take a hat-trick in an ODI after Chetan Sharma and Kapil Dev. He took the hat-trick at Eden Gardens, Kolkata, against Australia.

On 3 July 2018, Yadav took his first five-for in a T20I and also became the first left-arm wrist-spin bowler to take five wickets in a T20I during the first T20I against England, in fact he also became only the third Indian after Yuzvendra Chahal and Bhuvneshwar Kumar to take a five-wicket haul in a T20I.

On 12 July 2018, during the first ODI against England, Yadav grabbed his maiden five-wicket haul in an ODI and also set a new record for registering the best bowling figures by a left-arm spin bowler of any kind in an ODI (6/25). He also shattered the record of Shahid Afridi for registering the best bowling figures by a spinner against England in ODIs and also broke Afridi's record for recording the best ever bowling figures by a spinner in an ODI in England.

On 6 October 2018, in the first test against West Indies, Yadav took his first five-wicket haul in Tests.

After an impressive outing against Australia, in the T20I series of India tour of Australia 2018/19, Kuldeep jumped 20 places to claim a career-best third position in the MRF ICC T20I Bowlers Rankings, updated on 26 November 2018.

On 6 January 2019, in the fourth Test against Australia at the SCG and in Yadav's first Test match on Australian soil, he took his second five-wicket haul (5/99) in Tests, in Australia's first innings.

On 11 February 2019, Yadav moved to second position in the T20I Bowlers Rankings. In April 2019, he was named in India's squad for the 2019 Cricket World Cup. On 30 June 2019, in the match against England, Kuldeep played in his 50th ODI. On 18 December 2019, against West Indies he became the first bowler for India to take two hat-tricks in ODIs.

Yadav was included in India's ODI squad for the 2023 tour of the Caribbean. He had a good series coming after poor form following the 2019 World Cup. He picked seven wickets at 8.71, and was retained in the squad for the Asia Cup that year. In India's first match, against Pakistan, Yadav returned figures of 5/25, becoming the fifth bowler for his country to claim a five-wicket haul against Pakistan, and helped his team win by 228 runs. In the following match against Sri Lanka, he delivered another match-winning performance, claiming 4/43, and in the process, became the quickest Indian spinner to reach 150 ODI wickets in terms of matches played (88), going past Anil Kumble. He finished with nine wickets; India won the tournament, and Yadav was named player of the tournament.

In 2023 Cricket World Cup, Yadav was on the money from the first match against Australia, picking up 2 wickets for just 42 runs. He bowled even better against Pakistan, taking 2 wickets for 35 runs. He enjoyed less success against Bangladesh, getting just 1 wicket for 47 runs. A tame bowling spell against New Zealand cast doubts over Yadav's ability to counter aggression from the batters. However, he answered his critics with a splendid bowling spell against England, getting 2 for 24.

On 7 March 2024, Yadav achieved a test 5 wicket haul against England in Dharmasala, his second. In May 2024, he was named in India's squad for the 2024 ICC Men's T20 World Cup tournament. In 2025, Yadav had a historic and highly successful campaign in the 2025 Asia Cup, where he took 17 wickets from just 7 matches at a staggering average of 9.29 runs per wicket and an economy of just 6.28. He finished as the highest wicket-taker of the tournament and was named the Most Valuable Player.

== Personal life ==
On 4 June 2025, Kuldeep announced his engagement to childhood friend Vanshika. He tied knot married to Vanshika Chadha on 14 March 2026 in Mussoorie.

Outside of cricket, Kuldeep has a keen interest in football, and is a fan of La Liga club FC Barcelona. He has also mentioned being interested in starting football academies in India in the future. Kuldeep started a YouTube channel in August 2025, where he posts content centred around football. As of September 2025, the channel has amassed 22,000 subscribers.
