= Aamir Gani =

Indian cricketer (born 1996)

Personal information
- Full name: Aamir Abdul Gani
- Born: 27 August 1996 (age 30); Varanasi, Uttar Pradesh, India
- Batting: Right-handed
- Bowling: Right-arm offbreak
- Role: Bowler

International information
- National side: India

Domestic team information
- Years: Team
- 2013-present: Bengal

Career statistics
Competition	FC	LA	T20
Matches	21	17	18
Runs scored	695	155	39
Batting average	27.80	12.91	7.80
100s/50s	0/4	0/0	0/0
Top score	62	37	17
Balls bowled	3049	894	354
Wickets	44	13	23
Bowling average	35.13	58.15	17.78
5 wickets in innings	3	0	0
10 wickets in match	0	0	0
Best bowling	6/34	2/48	3/18
Catches/stumpings	2/–	3/-	6/0
- Source: ESPNcricinfo, 30 March 2019

Aamir Abdul Gani (born 27 August 1996) is a first-class cricketer from India.

He was a part India Squad for 2014 ICC Under-19 Cricket World Cup.
