= Sean Willis =

Australian cricketer (born 1995)

Personal information
- Full name: Sean William Willis
- Born: 6 January 1995 (age 31); Australia
- Height: 1.80 m (5 ft 11 in)
- Batting: Right-handed
- Bowling: Right-arm medium
- Role: Batsman

Domestic team information
- Years: Team
- 2014–present: Tasmania
- LA debut: 20 July 2014 NPS v South Africa A

Career statistics
Competition	FC	LA	T20
Matches	1	4	2
Runs scored	29	30	48
Batting average	14.50	7.50	24.00
100s/50s	0/0	0/0	0/0
Top score	24	15	35
Balls bowled	42	-	-
Wickets	1	-	-
Bowling average	38.00	-	-
5 wickets in innings	0	-	–
10 wickets in match	0	-	–
Best bowling	1/26	-/-	-/-
Catches/stumpings	1/–	2/–	0/–
- Source: CricketArchive, 5 October 2021

Sean William Willis (born 6 January 1995) is an Australian cricketer. He made his List A debut on 20 July 2014 for the Australia National Performance Squad against South Africa A, as part of the Australia A Team Quadrangular Series in 2014.

Willis played both cricket and Australian rules football during his school days at The Hutchins School, Tasmania, and has also played Australian rules football for North Hobart Football Club and Hobart City Football Club in the TSL.

In September 2018, he was named in the Hobart Hurricanes' squad for the 2018 Abu Dhabi T20 Trophy. He made his Twenty20 debut for the Hobart Hurricanes in the 2018 Abu Dhabi T20 Trophy on 5 October 2018. He made his first-class debut for Tasmania in the 2018–19 Sheffield Shield season on 12 March 2019.
