= Vijay Zol =

Indian cricketer (born 1994)

Personal information
- Full name: Vijay Hari Zol
- Born: 23 November 1994 (age 31); Jalna, Maharashtra, India
- Height: 5 ft 7 in (1.70 m)
- Batting: Left-handed
- Bowling: Right-arm off break
- Role: Batsman
- Relatives: Arjun Khotkar (father in law)

Domestic team information
- Years: Team
- 2012–present: Maharashtra
- 2014: Royal Challengers Bengaluru

Career statistics
| Competition | FC | LA | T20 |
|---|---|---|---|
| Matches | 11 | 7 | 11 |
| Runs scored | 965 | 252 | 280 |
| Batting average | 47.50 | 36.00 | 28.00 |
| 100s/50s | 2/2 | 0/2 | 1/1 |
| Top score | 200* | 75 | 109 |
| Catches/stumpings | 9/– | 0/– | 3/– |
- Source: ESPNcricinfo, 14 August 2014

Vijay Hari Zol (born 23 November 1994) is an Indian cricketer. He is a left-handed middle-order batsman who plays for Maharashtra. He is from Jalna, Maharashtra.

In 2012, he signed a youth contract with the IPL franchise Royal Challengers Bengaluru. He was also a member of India national under-19 cricket team. He was selected as the captain of Indian under 19 cricket team 2014.

== Under-19s Career ==
In December 2011, in an Under-19 first-class match for Maharashtra cricket team. Zol scored an unbeaten 451 off 467 deliveries, batting for almost eleven hours and hitting 53 boundaries and two sixes in the record-breaking innings.

Though there are no official records to verify exactly where he stands in the record books in youth cricket, Zol's score was higher than B. B. Nimbalkar's landmark 443, the highest first-class score by an Indian set in 1948 during a Ranji Trophy match between Maharashtra and Saurashtra.

Previously, he scored a double-century against Gujarat in the league stage of 2010's Vijay Merchant tournament. He was also a member of India national under-19 cricket team that won Asia Cup jointly with Pakistan. He was the man of the match in the final which ended in tie.

After Asia Cup, he was appointed as the vice-captain of the team for 2012 Under-19 Cricket World Cup in Australia. He played a crucial role for team in the World Cup. His batting at number 3 was well appreciated by cricketing greats.

He was in red-hot form having posted scores of 128, 173 and 128 in 2013. He produced another compelling batting display blasting 10 fours and two sixes during his 115-ball 103, and added vital stands of 67, 53 and 67 for the second, third and fourth wickets with Shubham Khajuria, Shreyas Iyer and Ricky Bhui.

Under his captaincy India under-19 team won the Under-19 Quadrangular Series in India in 2013–14. Out of the 6 matches played in the tournament India won 4 of them and 1 match ended without any result. Zol was the top run-scorer for India in the final as India crushed South Africa by 201 runs. Vijay zol was named the captain of the India national under-19 cricket team in 2014 for the 2014 Under-19 Cricket World Cup in Dubai. India were defeated in the tightly contested quarter-final tie by England in which the Indian captain scored 48 runs.

== Domestic career ==
He made his List "A" debut in February 2012 against Baroda. He scored 27 off 44 balls with 5 fours in his first visit to crease. In 2012, he signed a youth contract with the IPL team Royal Challengers Bengaluru.

In 2013, he was named in the India "A" squad for the long-format matches against the touring New Zealand "A" team. Zol scored a maiden century on his first-class debut in his 1st unofficial Test at Visakhapatnam.

== Record ==
In December 2011, in an Under-19 first-class match for Maharashtra. Zol scored an unbeaten 451 off 467 deliveries, batting for almost eleven hours, and hit 53 boundaries and two sixes in that record-breaking innings.

== Awards ==
Best Under-16 Cricketer 2011 MA Chidambaram Award for the Best U-19 Cricketer
