= Karamat Ali (cricketer) =

Pakistani cricketer (born 1996)

Personal information
- Born: 18 March 1996 (age 30)
- Height: 168 cm (5 ft 6 in)
- Batting: Right-handed
- Source: ESPNcricinfo

Karamat Ali (born 18 March 1996) is a Pakistani first-class cricketer.
