= Abdullah Adil =

Afghan cricketer (born 1994)

Personal information
- Born: 7 February 1994 (age 32); Momand, Nangarhar, Islamic State of Afghanistan
- Batting: Right-handed
Medal record
Men's Cricket
Representing Afghanistan
Asian Games
Silver medal – second place	2014 Incheon	Team
- Source: ESPNcricinfo

Abdullah Adil (born 7 February 1994) is an Afghan first-class cricketer, who competed at the 2014 Asian Games. His List A debut for Afghanistan A came against Zimbabwe A during their tour to Zimbabwe on 27 January 2017. He made his Twenty20 debut for Speen Ghar Tigers in the 2017 Shpageeza Cricket League on 17 September 2017.
