= Ankush Bains =

Indian cricketer (born 1995)

Personal information
- Full name: Ankush Katkar Singh Bains
- Born: 16 December 1995 (age 30); Hamirpur, Himachal Pradesh, India
- Batting: Right-handed
- Role: Wicket-keeper

Domestic team information
- Years: Team
- 2012/13–: Himachal Pradesh
- Source: ESPNcricinfo, 14 April 2015

Ankush Katkar Singh Bains (born 16 December 1995) is an Indian cricketer who plays for Himachal Pradesh as a wicket-keeper. He made his List A debut on 3 March 2014, for Himachal Pradesh in the 2013–14 Vijay Hazare Trophy. He was signed up by Chennai Super Kings for IPL 2015 at his base price of ₹ 10 lakhs. Then in the 2016 IPL auction he was bought by new team "Rising Pune Supergiants" for Rs. 10 Lakhs

In October 2018, he was named in India B's squad for the 2018–19 Deodhar Trophy. In December 2018, he was named in India's team for the 2018 ACC Emerging Teams Asia Cup. Later the same month, he was bought by the Delhi Capitals in the player auction for the 2019 Indian Premier League. He was released by the Delhi Capitals ahead of the 2020 IPL auction.
