= 2012 Under-19 Cricket World Cup squads =

This is a list of the squads picked for the 2012 ICC Under-19 Cricket World Cup. Players with international caps are listed in bold.

== Group A ==
=== Australia ===
Coach: (Australia) Stuart Law

Player	Date of Birth	Batting	Bowling style
William Bosisto (c)	8 September 1993 (aged 18)	Right	Right-arm off break
**Kurtis Patterson** (vc)	5 May 1993 (aged 19)	Left	Right-arm off break
**Cameron Bancroft** (wk)	19 November 1992 (aged 19)	Right	None
Meyrick Buchanan	15 September 1993 (aged 18)	Right	Right-arm off break
Shane Cassel	15 September 1993 (aged 18)	Left	Right-arm leg break
Harry Conway	17 September 1992 (aged 19)	Right	Right-arm fast-medium
Alex Gregory	27 June 1995 (aged 17)	Right	Right-arm fast-medium
**Sam Hain**	16 July 1995 (aged 17)	Right	Right-arm off break
Jesse Hall	9 December 1996 (aged 15)	Right	Right-arm fast
**Travis Head** (wk)	29 December 1993 (aged 18)	Left	None
**Joel Paris**	11 December 1992 (aged 19)	Left	Left-arm fast-medium
James Peirson (wk)	13 October 1992 (aged 19)	Right	None
**Gurinder Sandhu**	14 June 1993 (aged 19)	Left	Right-arm fast-medium
Mark Steketee	17 January 1994 (aged 18)	Right	Right-arm fast-medium
Nick Stevens	20 May 1994 (aged 18)	Right	Right-arm off break
**Ashton Turner**	25 January 1993 (aged 19)	Right	Right-arm off break

=== England ===
Coach: (England) Tim Boon

Player	Date of Birth	Batting	Bowling style
Adam Ball (c)	1 March 1993 (aged 19)	Right	Left-arm fast-medium
**Ben Foakes** (vc) (wk)	15 February 1993 (aged 19)	Right	None
Shozair Ali	28 December 1992 (aged 19)	Left	Right-arm fast-medium
Daniel Bell-Drummond	4 August 1993 (aged 19)	Right	Right-arm medium-fast
Ben Collins	16 October 1992 (aged 19)	Right	Right-arm off break
Alex Davies (wk)	23 August 1994 (aged 17)	Right	None
**Ben Duckett** (wk)	17 October 1994 (aged 17)	Left	Right-arm off break
Brett Hutton	6 February 1993 (aged 19)	Right	Right-arm medium
Aneesh Kapil	3 August 1993 (aged 19)	Right	Right-arm fast-medium
Tom Knight	28 June 1993 (aged 19)	Right	Slow left-arm orthodox spin
**Craig Overton**	10 April 1994 (aged 18)	Right	Right-arm medium-fast
**Jamie Overton**	10 April 1994 (aged 18)	Right	Right-arm fast-medium
**Reece Topley**	21 February 1994 (aged 18)	Right	Left-arm medium-fast
Kishen Velani	2 July 1994 (aged 18)	Right	Right-arm medium
Sam Wood	3 April 1993 (aged 19)	Left	Right-arm off break

=== Ireland ===
Coach: (Republic of Ireland) Ryan Eagleson

Player	Date of Birth	Batting	Bowling style
**George Dockrell** (c)	22 July 1992 (aged 20)	Right	Slow left-arm orthodox spin
Scott Campbell	15 November 1993 (aged 18)	Left	Slow left-arm orthodox spin
**Peter Chase**	9 October 1993 (aged 18)	Right	Right-arm medium
Adam Coughlan	1 December 1992 (aged 19)	Right	Right-arm off break
**Shane Getkate**	2 October 1991 (aged 20)	Right	Right-arm medium-fast
Ryan Hunter (wk)	19 November 1992 (aged 19)	Left	None
**Tyrone Kane**	8 July 1994 (aged 18)	Right	Right-arm medium
Robin Kelly	24 May 1993 (aged 19)	Left	Left-arm medium
**Andrew McBrine**	30 April 1993 (aged 19)	Left	Right-arm leg break
**Graeme McCarter**	10 October 1992 (aged 19)	Right	Right-arm medium
**Barry McCarthy**	13 September 1992 (aged 19)	Right	Right-arm medium
Alistair Shields	24 January 1994 (aged 18)	Right	Right-arm medium
Patrick Tice (wk)	30 June 1994 (aged 18)	Right	None
Jason van der Merwe	28 December 1991 (aged 20)	Right	None
Ben Wylie	24 April 1994 (aged 18)	Right	Right-arm off break

=== Nepal ===
Coach: (Sri Lanka) Pubudu Dassanayake

Player	Date of Birth	Batting	Bowling style
Prithu Baskota (c)	5 July 1992 (aged 20)	Right	Right-arm off break
**Pradeep Airee** (vc) (wk)	1 September 1992 (aged 19)	Right	Right-arm medium
**Naresh Budhayer**	15 October 1991 (aged 20)	Right	Right-arm medium
Fajlur Rahman	5 January 1992 (aged 20)	Right	Right-arm medium
Ramnaresh Giri	9 April 1996 (aged 16)	Right	Right-arm medium-fast
Hasim Ansari	19 November 1992 (aged 19)	Right	Right-arm medium-fast
Bhuwan Karki	28 January 1994 (aged 18)	Left	Slow left-arm orthodox spin
Krishna Karki	20 January 1992 (aged 20)	Right	Right-arm medium
**Avinash Karn**	4 April 1994 (aged 18)	Right	Left-arm medium
**Subash Khakurel** (wk)	7 April 1993 (aged 19)	Right	None
Saurav Khanal	19 December 1996 (aged 15)	Right	Right-arm medium-fast
**Rajesh Pulami**	27 April 1992 (aged 20)	Right	Right-arm leg break
**Sagar Pun**	1 March 1993 (aged 19)	Right	Right-arm off break
Gopal Singh	30 September 1995 (aged 16)	Right	Right-arm medium-fast
Rahul Vishwakarma	19 November 1992 (aged 19)	Left	Slow left-arm orthodox spin

== Group B ==
=== Afghanistan ===
Coach: (Australia) Geoff Lawson

Player	Date of Birth	Batting	Bowling style
**Javed Ahmadi** (c)	2 January 1992 (aged 20)	Right	Right-arm off break
**Shabir Noori** (vc)	2 February 1992 (aged 20)	Right	Right-arm off break
Abdul Naseri	9 September 1994 (aged 17)	Left	Slow left-arm orthodox spin
Abdur Mangal	10 December 1994 (aged 17)	Right	None
**Afsar Zazai** (wk)	10 August 1993 (aged 19)	Right	None
**Aftab Alam**	30 November 1992 (aged 19)	Right	Right-arm medium-fast
**Fareed Ahmad**	10 August 1994 (aged 18)	Left	Left-arm fast-medium
**Hashmatullah Shaidi**	4 November 1994 (aged 17)	Right	Right-arm off break
**Mohibullah Oryakhel**	12 October 1992 (aged 19)	Right	Right-arm medium
**Najibullah Zadran**	28 February 1993 (aged 19)	Left	Right-arm off break
**Nasir Jamal**	21 December 1993 (aged 18)	Right	Right-arm leg break
**Noor-ul-Haq**	2 April 1992 (aged 20)	Right	Right-arm off break
**Sayed Shirzad**	1 October 1994 (aged 17)	Left	Left-arm medium
**Yamin Ahmadzai**	25 June 1992 (aged 20)	Right	Right-arm medium-fast
Younas Ahmadzai	16 November 1995 (aged 16)	Right	None

=== Pakistan ===
Coach: (Pakistan) Sabih Azhar

Player	Date of Birth	Batting	Bowling style
**Babar Azam** (c)	15 October 1994 (aged 17)	Right	Right-arm off break
Umar Waheed (vc)	26 April 1994 (aged 18)	Right	None
Azizullah	11 September 1993 (aged 18)	Right	Right-arm fast
**Ehsan Adil**	15 March 1993 (aged 19)	Right	Right-arm fast
Faraz Ali	25 April 1993 (aged 19)	Right	Right-arm off break
**Imam-ul-Haq**	12 December 1995 (aged 16)	Left	None
**Mir Hamza**	10 September 1992 (aged 19)	Left	Left-arm medium
**Mohammad Nawaz**	21 March 1994 (aged 18)	Left	Slow left-arm orthodox spin
**Saad Ali**	5 October 1993 (aged 18)	Left	Right-arm medium
Salman Afridi (wk)	3 August 1992 (aged 20)	Right	None
**Sami Aslam**	12 December 1995 (aged 16)	Left	Right-arm medium
Shahid Ilyas	25 September 1992 (aged 19)	Right	Right-arm medium
**Usman Qadir**	10 August 1993 (aged 19)	Right	Right-arm leg break
**Zafar Gohar**	2 January 1995 (aged 17)	Left	Slow left-arm orthodox spin
Zia-ul-Haq	11 December 1994 (aged 17)	Left	Left-arm fast-medium

=== New Zealand ===
Coach: (New Zealand) Matt Horne

Player	Date of Birth	Batting	Bowling style
**Will Young** (c)	22 November 1992 (aged 19)	Right	Right-arm off break
Joe Carter	17 December 1992 (aged 19)	Right	None
Sean Davey	8 April 1993 (aged 19)	Right	Right-arm medium
Michael Davidson	3 September 1992 (aged 19)	Left	None
**Jacob Duffy**	2 August 1994 (aged 18)	Right	Right-arm fast-medium
Cam Fletcher (wk)	1 March 1993 (aged 19)	Right	None
Ben Horne	4 March 1994 (aged 18)	Right	Slow left-arm orthodox spin
Connor Neynens	8 March 1993 (aged 19)	Right	Right-arm medium
Ed Nuttall	15 July 1993 (aged 19)	Left	Left-arm medium-fast
Robert O'Donnell	12 September 1994 (aged 17)	Right	None
Matt Quinn	28 February 1993 (aged 19)	Right	Right-arm fast
**Ish Sodhi**	31 October 1992 (aged 19)	Right	Right-arm leg break
Theo van Woerkom	26 July 1993 (aged 19)	Right	Slow left-arm orthodox spin
Henry Walsh	5 December 1993 (aged 18)	Right	Left-arm medium
Arnie Yugaraja	13 October 1992 (aged 19)	Left	Right-arm off break

=== Scotland ===
Coach: (Scotland) Craig Wright

Player	Date of Birth	Batting	Bowling style
Patrick Sadler (c)	28 September 1991 (aged 20)	Right	Right-arm medium
**Mathew Cross** (vc) (wk)	15 October 1992 (aged 19)	Right	None
Aman Bailwal	29 April 1992 (aged 20)	Right	Left-arm medium
**Freddie Coleman**	15 December 1991 (aged 20)	Right	None
Henry Edwards	18 February 1993 (aged 19)	Right	None
Nicholas Farrar	31 July 1994 (aged 18)	Right	None
**Gavin Main**	28 February 1995 (aged 17)	Right	Right-arm fast
Tom McBride	19 March 1992 (aged 20)	Right	Right-arm leg break
Scott McElnea	2 October 1991 (aged 20)	Right	Right-arm medium
Ross McLean	25 November 1993 (aged 18)	Right	Right-arm off break
Sam Page	2 December 1992 (aged 19)	Right	Right-arm medium
Peter Ross	2 September 1992 (aged 19)	Right	Right-arm fast-medium
Kyle Smith	13 August 1992 (aged 19)	Right	Right-arm off break
**Ruaidhri Smith**	5 August 1994 (aged 18)	Right	Right-arm medium
Andrew Umeed	19 April 1996 (aged 16)	Right	Right-arm leg break

== Group C ==
=== India ===
Coach: (India) Bharat Arun

No.	Player	Date of Birth	Batting	Bowling style
9	Unmukt Chand (c)	26 March 1993 (aged 19)	Right	Right-arm off break
10	Akshdeep Nath (vc)	10 May 1993 (aged 19)	Right	Right-arm medium-fast
5	Baba Aparajith	8 July 1994 (aged 18)	Right	Right-arm off break
6	Prashant Chopra	7 October 1992 (aged 19)	Right	Right-arm leg break
11	Sandipan Das	29 November 1992 (aged 19)	Right	Right-arm medium
7	Harmeet Singh	7 September 1992 (aged 19)	Left	Slow left-arm orthodox spin
48	Akhil Herwadkar	31 October 1994 (aged 17)	Left	Right-arm off break
24	Rush Kalaria	16 January 1993 (aged 19)	Right	Left-arm medium
45	Vikas Mishra	27 December 1992 (aged 19)	Right	Slow left-arm orthodox spin
77	Kamal Passi	30 November 1992 (aged 19)	Right	Right-arm medium
3	Smit Patel (wk)	16 May 1993 (aged 19)	Right	None
4	Ravikant Singh	18 March 1994 (aged 18)	Right	Right-arm medium
66	**Sandeep Sharma**	18 May 1993 (aged 19)	Right	Right-arm medium
27	**Hanuma Vihari**	13 October 1993 (aged 18)	Right	Right-arm off break
1	Vijay Zol	23 November 1994 (aged 17)	Left	Right-arm off break

=== Papua New Guinea ===
Coach: (Papua New Guinea) John Ovia

Player	Date of Birth	Batting	Bowling style
Christopher Kent (c)	25 November 1991 (aged 20)	Right	Right-arm leg break
**Charles Amini**	14 April 1992 (aged 20)	Right	Right-arm leg break
Dogodo Bau (wk)	5 December 1994 (aged 17)	Right	None
**Sese Bau**	23 June 1992 (aged 20)	Left	Right-arm medium
Nigel Boge	22 November 1994 (aged 17)	Right	Right-arm leg break
Albert Geita	1 July 1992 (aged 20)	Right	Right-arm off break
Raymond Haoda	15 December 1991 (aged 20)	Right	Right-arm fast-medium
Raturima Maha	3 November 1993 (aged 18)	Left	None
Alei Nao	12 September 1993 (aged 18)	Right	Right-arm medium
Vagi Oala	12 November 1991 (aged 20)	Right	None
**Lega Siaka**	21 December 1992 (aged 19)	Right	Right-arm fast-medium
**Chad Soper**	19 November 1991 (aged 20)	Right	Right-arm medium-fast
Toua Tom	14 November 1992 (aged 19)	Right	Right-arm medium
**Kabua Vagi Morea**	30 September 1993 (aged 18)	Right	Left-arm medium
**Norman Vanua**	2 December 1993 (aged 18)	Right	Right-arm medium

=== West Indies ===
Coach: (Cricket West Indies) Roddy Estwick

Player	Date of Birth	Batting	Bowling style
**Kraigg Brathwaite** (c)	2 December 1992 (aged 19)	Right	Right-arm off break
**John Campbell** (vc)	21 September 1993 (aged 18)	Left	Right-arm off break
Anthony Alleyne	27 June 1993 (aged 19)	Left	Right-arm medium
**Sunil Ambris** (wk)	23 March 1993 (aged 19)	Right	None
**Ronsford Beaton**	17 September 1992 (aged 19)	Right	Right-arm fast-medium
Derone Davis	14 October 1992 (aged 19)	Left	Left-arm medium
**Justin Greaves**	26 April 1994 (aged 18)	Right	Right-arm medium
**Kavem Hodge**	21 February 1993 (aged 19)	Right	Slow left-arm orthodox spin
**Akeal Hosein**	23 April 1993 (aged 19)	Left	Slow left-arm orthodox spin
Jerome Jones	26 January 1995 (aged 17)	Right	Left-arm medium
Keiron Joseph	18 September 1992 (aged 19)	Right	None
Stephen Katwaroo (wk)	14 January 1993 (aged 19)	Right	None
Amir Khan	3 September 1992 (aged 19)	Right	Right-arm leg break
**Kyle Mayers**	8 September 1992 (aged 19)	Left	Right-arm medium
**Marquino Mindley**	29 December 1994 (aged 17)	Right	Right-arm fast-medium

=== Zimbabwe ===
Coach: (New Zealand) Chris Harris

Player	Date of Birth	Batting	Bowling style
Matthew Bentley (c)	25 August 1993 (aged 18)	Right	Right-arm off break
**Kevin Kasuza** (vc) (wk)	20 June 1993 (aged 19)	Right	Right-arm off break
Kyle Bowie	16 June 1993 (aged 19)	Right	Right-arm medium
**Ryan Burl**	15 April 1994 (aged 18)	Left	Right-arm leg break
Atish Chouhan	7 December 1992 (aged 19)	Left	None
Kieran Geyle	18 November 1994 (aged 17)	Right	Right-arm medium-fast
**Luke Jongwe**	6 February 1995 (aged 17)	Right	Right-arm medium
Malcolm Lake	3 August 1994 (aged 18)	Left	Right-arm medium
Campbell Light	13 September 1993 (aged 18)	Left	Right-arm fast-medium
**Wellington Masakadza**	10 April 1993 (aged 19)	Left	Slow left-arm orthodox spin
Luke Masasire	13 November 1993 (aged 18)	Left	Left-arm medium-fast
Nyasha Mayavo (wk)	28 September 1995 (aged 16)	Right	Right-arm leg break
Curthbert Musoko	13 May 1994 (aged 18)	Right	Right-arm fast
Andre Odendaal	14 October 1994 (aged 17)	Right	Left-arm medium-fast
Peacemore Zimwa	28 April 1993 (aged 19)	Right	Right-arm leg break

== Group D ==
=== Bangladesh ===
Coach: (Bangladesh) Zafrul Ehsan

Player	Date of Birth	Batting	Bowling style
**Anamul Haque** (c) (wk)	16 December 1992 (aged 19)	Right	None
**Nurul Hasan** (vc) (wk)	21 November 1993 (aged 18)	Right	None
**Abu Haider**	14 February 1996 (aged 16)	Right	Left-arm fast-medium
**Abu Jayed**	2 August 1993 (aged 19)	Right	Right-arm medium-fast
Al-Amin	5 October 1993 (aged 18)	Right	Right-arm off break
Asif Ahmed	17 December 1992 (aged 19)	Right	Right-arm off break
Dewan Sabbir	13 October 1992 (aged 19)	Right	Right-arm fast-medium
**Litton Das** (wk)	13 October 1994 (aged 17)	Right	None
**Mosaddek Hossain**	10 December 1995 (aged 16)	Right	Right-arm off break
Naeem Islam Jnr.	19 October 1994 (aged 17)	Right	Right-arm Slow
**Nasum Ahmed**	5 December 1994 (aged 17)	Left	Slow left-arm orthodox spin
Noor Hossain	3 December 1992 (aged 19)	Right	Right-arm leg break
Salman Hossain	18 June 1995 (aged 17)	Right	Right-arm fast-medium
**Soumya Sarkar**	25 February 1993 (aged 19)	Left	Right-arm medium-fast
**Taskin Ahmed**	3 April 1995 (aged 17)	Right	Right-arm medium-fast

=== Namibia ===
Coach: (South Africa) Doug Watson

Player	Date of Birth	Batting	Bowling style
**Stephan Baard** (c)	29 April 1992 (aged 20)	Right	Right-arm medium-fast
Justin Baard (wk)	18 November 1993 (aged 18)	Right	Right-arm off break
Luke Bolton	5 May 1992 (aged 20)	Right	Right-arm medium
Christopher Coombe	13 July 1993 (aged 19)	Right	Right-arm medium
Jason Davidson	21 May 1993 (aged 19)	Right	None
Andre Engelbrecht	15 November 1991 (aged 20)	Right	Right-arm medium
**Gerhard Erasmus** (wk)	11 May 1995 (aged 17)	Right	Right-arm leg break
Shalako Groenewald	8 June 1993 (aged 19)	Right	Right-arm off break
Zhivago Groenewald	8 June 1993 (aged 19)	Right	None
Malan Kruger	12 April 1995 (aged 17)	Right	None
Pelham Myburgh	7 April 1992 (aged 20)	Left	None
Xander Pitchers	20 February 1995 (aged 17)	Right	Right-arm off break
Michau du Preez (wk)	3 January 1996 (aged 16)	Right	Right-arm leg break
Wian van Vuuren (wk)	31 March 1993 (aged 19)	Right	None
Bredell Wessels	9 March 1995 (aged 17)	Right	Right-arm medium

=== South Africa ===
Coach: (South Africa) Ray Jennings

Player	Date of Birth	Batting	Bowling style
**Chad Bowes** (c)	19 October 1992 (aged 19)	Right	Right-arm medium
**Gihahn Cloete** (wk)	4 October 1992 (aged 19)	Left	Right-arm off break
Murray Coetzee (wk)	16 September 1993 (aged 18)	Left	None
**Theunis de Bruyn**	8 October 1992 (aged 19)	Right	Right-arm medium-fast
**Quinton de Kock** (wk)	17 October 1992 (aged 19)	Left	None
Corné Dry	4 February 1993 (aged 19)	Right	Right-arm medium-fast
**Jan Frylinck**	6 April 1994 (aged 18)	Left	Left-arm fast-medium
Vincent Moore	25 February 1994 (aged 18)	Right	Left-arm medium
Solo Nqweni	20 October 1993 (aged 18)	Right	Right-arm fast-medium
Shaylin Pillay	12 April 1994 (aged 18)	Right	Right-arm medium
David Rhoda	20 August 1993 (aged 18)	Right	Right-arm leg break
Diego Rosier	2 May 1994 (aged 18)	Right	Right-arm leg break
Calvin Savage (wk)	4 January 1993 (aged 19)	Right	Right-arm fast
**Prenelan Subrayen**	23 September 1993 (aged 18)	Right	Right-arm off break
**Lizaad Williams**	1 October 1993 (aged 18)	Right	Right-arm medium-fast

=== Sri Lanka ===
Coach: (Sri Lanka) Romesh Kaluwitharana

Player	Date of Birth	Batting	Bowling style
Sanitha de Mel (c)	15 November 1992 (aged 19)	Right	Right-arm medium-fast
Angelo Jayasinghe (vc)	25 January 1993 (aged 19)	Right	Right-arm leg break
Vidura Adikari	6 October 1993 (aged 18)	Left	Slow left-arm orthodox spin
**Amila Aponso**	23 June 1993 (aged 19)	Right	Slow left-arm orthodox spin
**Niroshan Dickwella** (wk)	23 June 1993 (aged 19)	Left	None
Anuk Fernando	1 August 1995 (aged 17)	Left	Left-arm medium-fast
Shehan Fernando	14 April 1993 (aged 19)	Right	Right-arm off break
**Tharindu Kaushal**	5 March 1993 (aged 19)	Right	Right-arm off break
Ranitha Liyanarachchi	19 June 1994 (aged 18)	Left	Right-arm fast-medium
**Lahiru Madushanka**	12 September 1992 (aged 19)	Right	Right-arm fast-medium
Chamod Pathirana	23 November 1992 (aged 19)	Right	Right-arm medium-fast
Sebastian Perera	12 March 1993 (aged 19)	Left	Left-arm medium-fast
Pulina Tharanga	23 January 1993 (aged 19)	Right	Right-arm leg break
Pabasara Waduge	10 July 1993 (aged 19)	Right	Right-arm medium
**Sandun Weerakkody** (wk)	3 September 1993 (aged 18)	Left	None
