= 2012 Under-19 Cricket World Cup =

International cricket tournament

2012 ICC Under-19 Cricket World Cup
- Dates: 11 August – 26 August 2012
- Administrator: International Cricket Council
- Cricket format: Limited-overs (50 overs)
- Tournament format(s): Round-robin and knockout
- Host: Australia
- Champions: India (3rd title)
- Runners-up: Australia
- Participants: 16
- Matches: 48
- Player of the series: (Australia) Will Bosisto
- Most runs: (Bangladesh) Anamul Haque (365)
- Most wickets: (England) Reece Topley (19)
- Official website: iccu19cricketworldcup.com

The 2012 ICC Under-19 Cricket World Cup was a one-day cricket competition for sixteen international U-19 cricketing teams which was held in August 2012. It was the ninth edition of the Under-19 Cricket World Cup. The tournament was held in Australia for the second time after previously hosting it in 1988 with the tournament being held across three cities (Brisbane, Sunshine Coast and Townsville).

Six teams qualified from the qualifying event as they joined the full members that automatically qualified through to the World Cup. The teams were separated into four groups of four with the top two teams qualifying through to the Super League while the bottom two will compete in the Plate Championship. After finishing second in their group, India beat Australia in the final by six wickets to win their third title after previously winning in 2000 and 2008. India's Unmukt Chand scored 111 not out, facing 130 balls and was awarded Man of the Final. Australian captain Will Bosisto was awarded Man of the Series. Canada was originally scheduled to be the host of the event, after being selected as hosts in 2007.

== Qualification ==
16 teams participated in the competition. The 10 nations with ICC Full Membership automatically qualified for the tournament. Ten further teams competed in the qualifying event which was held in Ireland with only the top six teams qualifying through to the 2012 World Cup. Scotland (winners), Nepal, Ireland, Afghanistan, Papua New Guinea and Namibia all finished in the top 6 to book their spot into the World Cup.

Team	Mode of qualification
Australia	ICC Full Member
Bangladesh	ICC Full Member
England	ICC Full Member
India	ICC Full Member
New Zealand	ICC Full Member
Pakistan	ICC Full Member
South Africa	ICC Full Member
Sri Lanka	ICC Full Member
West Indies	ICC Full Member
Zimbabwe	ICC Full Member
Scotland	2011 ICC U-19 World Cup Qualifier (1st)
Nepal	2011 ICC U-19 World Cup Qualifier (2nd)
Ireland	2011 ICC U-19 World Cup Qualifier (3rd)
Afghanistan	2011 ICC U-19 World Cup Qualifier (4th)
Papua New Guinea	2011 ICC U-19 World Cup Qualifier (5th)
Namibia	2011 ICC U-19 World Cup Qualifier (6th)

== Groups ==
The following groups were chosen for the World Cup 2012 by the International Cricket Council. The number alongside gives the rank of the team. The tournament will begin with a league stage consisting of four groups of four. Each team will play each of the other teams in its group once.

Group A

- Australia (1)
- England (8)
- Nepal (12)
- Ireland (13)

Group B

- Pakistan (2)
- New Zealand (7)
- Scotland (11)
- Afghanistan (14)

Group C

- West Indies (3)
- India (6)
- Zimbabwe (10)
- Papua New Guinea (15)

Group D

- Sri Lanka (4)
- South Africa (5)
- Bangladesh (9)
- Namibia (16)

== Squads ==
Each country selected a 15-man squad for the tournament.

== Fixtures ==
Fixtures as follows:-

=== Warm-up games ===
Warm-up matches

7 August
09:30
Scorecard

New Zealand; 184/8 (50 overs)	v	South Africa; 185/4 (29.2 overs)
Henry Walsh 33 (38); Vincent Moore 2/19 (6 overs)		Quinton de Kock 80* (65); Theo van Woerkom 2/40 (4.2 overs)

South Africa Under-19s won by 6 wickets
University of Queensland, WEP Harris Oval, St Lucia, Australia
Umpires: Richard Illingworth (Eng) and Sarika Prasad (Sin)

- South Africa Under-19s won the toss and elected to field.

7 August
09:30
Scorecard

Scotland; 106 (37.5 overs)	v	Bangladesh; 107/3 (20.1 overs)
Ross McLean 29 (66); Nasum Ahmed 4/21 (6.5 overs)		Salman Hossain 37* (45); Gavin Main 1/18 (3 overs)

Bangladesh Under-19s won by 7 wickets
University of Queensland No.2, St Lucia, Australia
Umpires: Mark Hawthorne (Ire) and Ranmore Martinesz (SL)

- Bangladesh Under-19s won the toss and elected to field.

7 August
09:30
Scorecard

Nepal; 213 (43.3 overs)	v	Papua New Guinea; 214/2 (40.3 overs)
Hasim Ansari 81 (80); Chad Soper 5/22 (7.3 overs)		Lega Siaka 106 (112); Rahul Vishwakarma 2/40 (7 overs)

Papua New Guinea Under-19s won by 8 wickets
Sandgate-Redcliffe DCC Albury Oval, Australia
Umpires: Enamul Haque (Ban) and Ian Ramage (Sco)

- Nepal Under-19s won the toss and elected to bat.

7 August
09:30
Scorecard

India; 191/8 (50 overs)	v	Sri Lanka; 158 (45.5 overs)
Hanuma Vihari 64 (83); Chamod Pathirana 2/13 (7 overs)		Angelo Jayasinghe 64* (97); Kamal Passi 3/34 (8 overs)

India Under-19s won by 33 runs
Wynnum-Manly DCC Bill Albury, Australia
Umpires: Ahsan Raza (Pak) and Johan Cloete (SA)

- India Under-19s won the toss and elected to bat.

7 August
09:30
Scorecard

Pakistan; 281/6 (50 overs)	v	England; 283/5 (44 overs)
Saad Ali 100 (92); Jamie Overton 3/22 (7 overs)		Ben Foakes 133 (119); Usman Qadir 2/48 (7 overs)

England Under-19s won by 5 wickets
Redlands Fred Kratzman Oval, Redland City, Australia
Umpires: Chris Gaffaney (NZ) and Courtney Young (Cay)

- England Under-19s won the toss and elected to field.

7 August
09:30
Scorecard

Afghanistan; 257/6 (50 overs)	v	Ireland; 156 (40 overs)
Hashmatullah Shaidi 64 (84); Tyrone Kane 2/46 (9 overs)		Shane Getkate 45 (60); Javed Ahmadi 3/10 (6 overs)

Afghanistan Under-19s won by 101 runs
Norman Gray Oval, Fairfield, Australia
Umpires: Peter Nero (WI) and S Ravi (Ind)

- Ireland Under-19s won the toss and elected to field.

7 August
09:30
Scorecard

Namibia; 180/9 (49.2 overs)	v	Zimbabwe; 181/3 (49.2 overs)
Stephan Baard 36 (44); Curthbert Musoko 4/42 (10 overs)		Kevin Kasuza 63 (69); Stephan Baard 1/14 (4 overs)

Zimbabwe Under-19s won by 7 wickets
Ron McMullin Oval, Sunshine Coast, Australia
Umpires: Sam Nogajski (Aus) and Buddhi Pradhan (Nep)

- Namibia Under-19s won the toss and elected to bat.

7 August
09:30
Scorecard

West Indies; 235/6 (50 overs)	v	Australia; 222 (49.1 overs)
Kraigg Brathwaite 96 (123); Ashton Turner 5/47 (10 overs)		Ashton Agar 80 (70); Akeal Hosein 4/37 (10 overs)

West Indies Under-19s won by 13 runs
Kev Hackney Oval, Sunshine Coast, Australia
Umpires: Owen Chirombe (Zim) and Richard Smith (Ire)

- Australia Under-19s won the toss and elected to field.

8 August
09:30
Scorecard

England; 220 (49.4 overs)	v	Zimbabwe; 89 (35.2 overs)
Brett Hutton 55 (66); Curthbert Musoko 4/39 (8.4 overs)		Nyasha Mayavo 21 (46); Brett Hutton 3/28 (9 overs)

England Under-19s won by 131 runs
University of Queensland, WEP Harris Oval, St Lucia, Australia
Umpires: Enamul Haque (Ban) and Peter Nero (WI)

- England Under-19s won the toss and elected to bat.

8 August
09:30
Scorecard

West Indies; 324/7 (50 overs)	v	Namibia; 182 (46.4 overs)
Sunil Ambris 103* (58); Jason Davidson 1/40 (8 overs)		Jano Coetzee 89 (123); Ronsford Beaton 4/43 (9 overs)

West Indies Under-19s won by 146 runs
University of Queensland No.2, St Lucia, Australia
Umpires: Ahsan Raza (Pak) and Ian Ramage (Sco)

- West Indies Under-19s won the toss and elected to bat.

8 August
09:30
Scorecard

Sri Lanka; 188 (45.2 overs)	v	Ireland; 138 (39.3 overs)
Pabasara Waduge 29 (35); George Dockrell 2/18 (10 overs)		Ryan Hunter 55 (99); Tharindu Kaushal 6/20 (8.3 overs)

Sri Lanka Under-19s won by 50 runs
Sandgate-Redcliffe DCC Albury Oval, [Brisbane], Australia
Umpires: Chris Gaffaney (NZ) and Sarika Prasad (Sin)

- Sri Lanka Under-19s won the toss and elected to bat.

8 August
09:30
Scorecard

Australia; 315/7 (50 overs)	v	Scotland; 244 (45.3 overs)
James Peirson 128* (123); Aman Bailwal 5/52 (10 overs)		Mathew Cross 104 (70); Gurinder Sandhu 5/51 (10 overs)

Australia Under-19s won by 71 runs
Wynnum-Manly DCC Bill Albury, [Brisbane], Australia
Umpires: S Ravi (Ind) and Courtney Young (Cay)

- Australia Under-19s won the toss and elected to bat.

8 August
09:30
Scorecard

India; 271/7(50 overs)	v	Afghanistan; 219 (46.2 overs)
Baba Aparajith 83 (75); Shabir Noori 4/45 (10 overs)		Shabir Noori 62 (74); Harmeet Singh 5/32 (10 overs)

India Under-19s won by 52 runs
Redlands Fred Kratzman Oval, Redland City, Australia
Umpires: Richard Illingworth (Eng) and Ranmore Martinesz (SL)

- India Under-19s won the toss and elected to bat.

8 August
09:30
Scorecard

Papua New Guinea; 194/6 (50 overs)	v	Pakistan; 197/2 (32.3 overs)
Lega Siaka 46 (77); Usman Qadir 3/32 (10 overs)		Sami Aslam 132 (99); Raymond Haoda 1/30 (6 overs)

Pakistan Under-19s won by 8 wickets
Norman Gray Oval, fairfield, Australia
Umpires: Johan Cloete (SA) and Mark Hawthorne (Ire)

- Pakistan Under-19s won the toss and elected to field.

8 August
09:30
Scorecard

New Zealand; 267/8 (50 overs)	v	Nepal; 248/9 (50 overs)
Will Young 97 (99); Saurav Khanal 3/46 (8 overs)		Naresh Budhayer 114 (142); Arnie Yugaraja 3/25 (4 overs)

New Zealand Under-19s won by 19 runs
Ron McMullin Oval, Sunshine Coast, Australia
Umpires: Sam Nogajski (Aus) and Richard Smith (Ire)

- New Zealand Under-19s won the toss and elected to bat.

8 August
09:30
Scorecard

Bangladesh; 213 (49 overs)	v	South Africa; 214/6 (49.5 overs)
Al-Amin 60 (73); Vincent Moore 2/5 (5 overs)		Chad Bowes 104* (145); Al-Amin 2/44 (10 overs)

South Africa Under-19s won by 4 wickets
Kev Hackney Oval, Sunshine Coast, Australia
Umpires: Owen Chirombe (Zim) and Buddhi Pradhan (Nep)

- Bangladesh Under-19s won the toss and elected to bat.

=== Group stage ===
- The top 2 teams from each group qualified for the knock-out rounds of the tournament.
- The bottom 2 teams from each group take part in a Plate competition knock-out.

==== Group A ====
Pos	Team	Pld	W	L	T	NR	Pts	NRR
1	Australia	3	3	0	0	0	6	2.208
2	England	3	2	1	0	0	4	0.906
3	Ireland	3	1	2	0	0	2	−0.468
4	Nepal	3	0	3	0	0	0	−2.353

11 August
09:30
Scorecard

England; 143 (38.3 overs)	v	Australia; 147/4 (35.1 overs)
Craig Overton 35 (81); Gurinder Sandhu 3/27 (9.3 overs)		Travis Head 57* (58); Reece Topley 2/33 (10 overs)

Australia Under-19s won by 6 wickets
Tony Ireland Stadium, Townsville, Australia
Umpires: Johan Cloete (SA) and S Ravi (Ind)
Player of the match: Travis Head (Aus)

- Australia Under-19s won the toss and elected to field

12 August
09:30
Scorecard

Ireland; 109 (42.2 overs)	v	England; 113/3 (36.2 overs)
Tyrone Kane 28 (52); Reece Topley 3/14 (9 overs)		Ben Foakes 32 (45); Tyrone Kane 1/14 (5.2 overs)

England Under-19s won by 7 wickets
Endeavour Park 1, Townsville, Australia
Umpires: Ahsan Raza (Pak) and Ian Ramage (Sco)
Player of the match: Reece Topley (Eng)

- England Under-19s won the toss and elected to field

13 August
09:30
Scorecard

Australia; 294/7 (50 overs)	v	Nepal; 82 (23.5 overs)
Cameron Bancroft 125 (139); Pradeep Airee 2/40 (5 overs)		Sagar Pun 22 (39); Ashton Turner 4/28 (5.5 overs)

Australia Under-19s won by 212 runs
Tony Ireland Stadium, Townsville, Australia
Umpires: Ian Ramage (Sco) and S Ravi (Ind)
Player of the match: Cameron Bancroft (Aus)

- Nepal Under-19s won the toss and elected to field
- Harry Conway (Australia Under-19s) took a hat-trick.

14 August
09:30
Scorecard

Ireland; 129 (42.5 overs)	v	Australia; 133/4 (40.3 overs)
Ryan Hunter 31 (139); Alex Gregory 3/13 (8 overs)		Will Bosisto 36* (84); George Dockrell 1/10 (10 overs)

Australia Under-19s won by 6 wickets
Endeavour Park 2, Townsville, Australia
Umpires: Ahsan Raza (Pak) and S Ravi (Ind)
Player of the match: Shane Cassel (Aus)

- Ireland Under-19s won the toss and elected to bat

15 August
09:30
Scorecard

Ireland; 185/8 (50 overs)	v	Nepal; 171 (49.3 overs)
Shane Getkate 47 (81); Rahul Vishwakarma 2/31 (10 overs)		Rahul Vishwakarma 32 (44); George Dockrell 4/22 (10 overs)

Ireland Under-19s won by 14 runs
Endeavour Park 1, Townsville, Australia
Umpires: Johan Cloete (SA) and Ian Ramage (Sco)
Player of the match: George Dockrell (Ire)

- Ireland Under-19s won the toss and elected to bat

16 August
09:30
Scorecard

England; 274/7 (50 overs)	v	Nepal; 148 (46 overs)
Ben Foakes 92 (84); Rahul Vishwakarma 3/62 (9 overs)		Subash Khakurel 55 (70); Shozair Ali 4/37 (10 overs)

England Under-19s won by 126 runs
Tony Ireland Stadium, Townsville, Australia
Umpires: Ahsan Raza (Pak) and Johan Cloete (SA)
Player of the match: Ben Foakes (Eng)

- England Under-19s won the toss and elected to bat

==== Group B ====
Pos	Team	Pld	W	L	T	NR	Pts	NRR
1	Pakistan	3	3	0	0	0	6	1.877
2	New Zealand	3	2	1	0	0	4	−0.215
3	Afghanistan	3	1	2	0	0	2	−0.713
4	Scotland	3	0	3	0	0	0	−0.782

11 August
09:30
Scorecard

Pakistan; 253/6 (50 overs)	v	Afghanistan; 144 (45.1 overs)
Babar Azam 75 (103); Sayed Shiraz 2/43 (9 overs)		Hashmatullah Shaidi 50 (77); Zia-ul-Haq 4/30 (8.1 overs)

Pakistan Under-19s won by 109 runs
John Blanck Oval, Sunshine Coast, Australia
Umpires: Buddhi Pradhan (Nep) and Paul Reiffel (Aus)
Player of the match: Babar Azam (Pak)

- Afghanistan Under-19s won the toss and elected to field

12 August
09:30
Scorecard

New Zealand; 247/9 (50 overs)	v	Scotland; 208 (46.5 overs)
Will Young 115 (111); Ruaidhri Smith 3/34 (10 overs)		Freddie Coleman 65 (80); Connor Neynens 3/24 (10 overs)

New Zealand Under-19s won by 39 runs
John Blanck Oval, Sunshine Coast, Australia
Umpires: Owen Chirombe (Zim) and Richard Smith (Ire)
Player of the match: Will Young (NZ)

- Scotland Under-19s won the toss and elected to field

13 August
09:30
Scorecard

Scotland; 200 (49.5 overs)	v	Pakistan; 204/1 (36.2 overs)
Ross McLean 59 (101); Mohammad Nawaz 4/20 (10 overs)		Babar Azam 106* (120); Kyle Smith 1/36 (9 overs)

Pakistan Under-19s won by 9 wickets
Kev Hackney Oval, Sunshine Coast, Australia
Umpires: Owen Chirombe (Zim) and Buddhi Pradhan (Nep)
Player of the match: Babar Azam (Pak)

- Scotland Under-19s won the toss and elected to bat

14 August
09:30
Scorecard

New Zealand; 198 (50 overs)	v	Afghanistan; 190/9 (50 overs)
Robert O'Donnell 69 (102); Sayed Shirzad 4/34 (10 overs)		Najibullah Zadran 69 (91); Matt Quinn 4/26 (9 overs)

New Zealand Under-19s won by 8 runs
Kev Hackney Oval, Sunshine Coast, Australia
Umpires: Paul Reiffel (Aus) and Richard Smith (Ire)
Player of the match: Matt Quinn (NZ)

- New Zealand Under-19s won the toss and elected to bat

15 August
09:30
Scorecard

Afghanistan; 191 (48.3 overs)	v	Scotland; 181 (49.2 overs)
Javed Ahmadi 71 (76); Gavin Main 4/26 (8 overs)		Ross McLean 67 (109); Sayed Shirzad 3/33 (10 overs)

Afghanistan Under-19s won by 10 runs
John Blanck Oval, Sunshine Coast, Australia
Umpires: Owen Chirombe (Zim) and Buddhi Pradhan (Nep)
Player of the match: Javed Ahmadi (Afg)

- Afghanistan Under-19s won the toss and elected to bat

16 August
09:30
Scorecard

New Zealand; 152/8 (50 overs)	v	Pakistan; 153/5 (31.2 overs)
Henry Walsh 33 (61); Ehsan Adil 2/21 (10 overs)		Imam-ul-Haq 40 (71); Theo van Woerkom 2/43 (8 overs)

Pakistan Under-19s won by 5 wickets
John Blanck Oval, Sunshine Coast, Australia
Umpires: Owen Chirombe (Zim) and Richard Smith (Ire)
Player of the match: Mohammad Nawaz (Pak)

- New Zealand Under-19s won the toss and elected to bat

==== Group C ====
Pos	Team	Pld	W	L	T	NR	Pts	NRR
1	West Indies	3	3	0	0	0	6	1.750
2	India	3	2	1	0	0	4	1.067
3	Zimbabwe	3	1	2	0	0	2	−0.147
4	Papua New Guinea	3	0	3	0	0	0	−2.718

11 August
09:30
Scorecard

Zimbabwe; 249 (50 overs)	v	Papua New Guinea; 145 (38.1 overs)
Kevin Kasuza 97 (121); Christopher Kent 5/45 (7 overs)		Sese Bau 34 (34); Matthew Bentley 2/20 (7 overs)

Zimbabwe Under-19s won by 104 runs
Endeavour Park 1, Townsville, Australia
Umpires: Chris Gaffaney (NZ) and Courtney Young (Cay)
Player of the match: Kevin Kasuza (Zim)

- Papua New Guinea Under-19s won the toss and elected to field

12 August
09:30
Scorecard

India; 166/8 (50 overs)	v	West Indies; 167/6 (47.1 overs)
Smit Patel 51 (99); Ronsford Beaton 3/33 (10 overs)		Anthony Alleyne 52 (91); Harmeet Singh 3/35 (10 overs)

West Indies Under-19s won by 4 wickets
Tony Ireland Stadium, Townsville, Australia
Umpires: Chris Gaffaney (NZ) and Ranmore Martinesz (SL)
Player of the match: Kyle Mayers (WI)

- West Indies Under-19s won the toss and elected to field

13 August
09:30
Scorecard

Papua New Guinea; 116 (41 overs)	v	West Indies; 117/1 (11.4 overs)
Christopher Kent 39 (62); Kyle Mayers 3/12 (4 overs)		Sunil Ambris 91 (43); Sese Bau 1/6 (0.4 overs)

West Indies Under-19s won by 9 wickets
Endeavour Park 2, Townsville, Australia
Umpires: Enamul Haque (Ban) and Courtney Young (Cay)
Player of the match: Sunil Ambris (WI)

- Papua New Guinea Under-19s won the toss and elected to bat

14 August
09:30
Scorecard

India; 261/6 (50 overs)	v	Zimbabwe; 198 (44.1 overs)
Unmukt Chand 78 (85); Campbell Light 3/22 (4 overs)		Malcolm Lake 118 (107); Kamal Passi 6/23 (8.1 overs)

India Under-19s won by 63 runs
Tony Ireland Stadium, Townsville, Australia
Umpires: Enamul Haque (Ban) and Ranmore Martinesz (SL)
Player of the match: Kamal Passi (Ind)

- Zimbabwe Under-19s won the toss and elected to field

16 August
09:30
Scorecard

India; 204 (45.1 overs)	v	Papua New Guinea; 97 (31.5 overs)
Vijay Zol 72 (95); Chad Soper 5/32 (7.1 overs)		Charles Amini 28 (18); Ravikant Singh 5/21 (9 overs)

India Under-19s won by 107 runs
Endeavour Park 1, Townsville, Australia
Umpires: Ranmore Martinesz (SL) and Courtney Young (Cay)
Player of the match: Ravikant Singh (Ind)

- India Under-19s won the toss and elected to bat

16 August
09:30
Scorecard

Zimbabwe; 148/8 (50 overs)	v	West Indies; 150/4 (35.1 overs)
Malcolm Lake 31 (45); Justin Greaves 2/28 (6 overs)		Kraigg Brathwaite 70* (116); Kieran Geyle 2/28 (5 overs)

West Indies Under-19s won by 6 wickets
Endeavour Park 2, Townsville, Australia
Umpires: Enamul Haque (Ban) and Chris Gaffaney (NZ)
Player of the match: Kraigg Brathwaite (WI)

==== Group D ====
Pos	Team	Pld	W	L	T	NR	Pts	NRR
1	South Africa	3	3	0	0	0	6	2.987
2	Bangladesh	3	2	1	0	0	4	−0.336
3	Sri Lanka	3	1	2	0	0	2	0.683
4	Namibia	3	0	3	0	0	0	−3.234

11 August
09:30
Scorecard

Bangladesh; 249/7 (50 overs)	v	Sri Lanka; 224 (48.4 overs)
Anamul Haque 101 (127); Sanitha de Mel 3/46 (10 overs)		Angelo Jayasinghe 83 (121); Soumya Sarkar 3/10 (1.4 overs)

Bangladesh Under-19s won by 25 runs
Allan Border Field, Brisbane, Australia
Umpires: Richard Illingworth (Eng) and Sarika Prasad (Sin)
Player of the match: Anamul Haque (Ban)

- Sri Lanka Under-19s won the toss and elected to field

12 August
09:30
Scorecard

South Africa; 294/8 (50 overs)	v	Bangladesh; 161 (34.3 overs)
Quinton de Kock 95 (131); Noor Hossain 3/44 (10 overs)		Anamul Haque 39 (60); Vincent Moore 3/44 (10 overs)

South Africa Under-19s won by 133 runs
Allan Border Field, Brisbane, Australia
Umpires: Mark Hawthorne (Ire) and Peter Nero (WI)
Player of the match: Quinton de Kock (SA)

- Bangladesh Under-19s won the toss and elected to field

13 August
09:30
Scorecard

Sri Lanka; 298/9 (50 overs)	v	Namibia; 103 (35 overs)
Sebastian Perera 69 (84); Zhivago Groenewald 3/49 (9 overs)		Wian van Vuuren 38 (80); Lahiru Madushanka 4/15 (6 overs)

Sri Lanka Under-19s won by 195 runs
Allan Border Field, Brisbane, Australia
Umpires: Mark Hawthorne (Ire) and Richard Illingworth (Eng)
Player of the match: Sebastian Perera (SL)

- Sri Lanka Under-19s won the toss and elected to bat

14 August
09:30
Scorecard

South Africa; 359/6 (50 overs)	v	Namibia; 150 (46 overs)
Quinton de Kock 126 (106); Zhivago Groenewald 3/85 (9 overs)		Pelham Myburgh 37 (82); Theunis de Bruyn 4/20 (5 overs)

South Africa Under-19s won by 209 runs
Peter Burge Oval, Redland City, Australia
Umpires: Peter Nero (WI) and Sarika Prasad (Sin)
Player of the match: Quinton de Kock (SA)

- South Africa Under-19s won the toss and elected to bat

15 August
09:30
Scorecard

Sri Lanka; 150 (37.4 overs)	v	South Africa; 153/6 (33 overs)
Pulina Tharanga 50* (60); Corné Dry 4/16 (8 overs)		Chad Bowes 46 (51); Tharindu Kaushal 3/28 (10 overs)

South Africa Under-19s won by 4 wickets
Peter Burge Oval, Redland City, Australia
Umpires: Mark Hawthorne (Ire) and Richard Illingworth (Eng)
Player of the match: Corné Dry (SA)

- South Africa Under-19s won the toss and elected to field

16 August
09:30
Scorecard

Namibia; 151 (49.4 overs)	v	Bangladesh; 155/3 (37.0 overs)
Stephan Baard 40 (70); Abu Jayed 3/29 (8 overs)		Liton Das 70* (115); Jason Davidson 1/19 (4 overs)

Bangladesh Under-19s won by 7 wickets
Peter Burge Oval, Redland City, Australia
Umpires: Peter Nero (WI) and Sarika Prasad (Sin)
Player of the match: Liton Das (Ban)

- Namibia won the toss and elected to bat

== Knockout stages ==
=== Plate Championship ===
9th place play-off quarter-finals
19 August – (Australia) Allan Border Field
Papua New Guinea	239/5
Afghanistan	244/6
19 August – (Australia) Allan Border Field
Scotland	241/7
Zimbabwe	200/9
20 August – (Australia) Peter Burge Oval
Nepal	79
Sri Lanka	80/2
20 August – (Australia) WEP Harris Oval
Namibia	128/9
Ireland	129/6

9th place play-off semi-finals
21 August – (Australia) Allan Border Field
Afghanistan	336/7
Scotland	210
22 August – (Australia) Allan Border Field
Sri Lanka	258
Ireland	149

9th place play-off
24 August – (Australia) Allan Border Field
Afghanistan	194/9
Sri Lanka	196/3
11th place play-off
24 August – (Australia) WEP Harris Oval
Scotland	185/5
Ireland	182

Quarter-finals

13th place play-off semi-finals
21 August – (Australia) Peter Burge Oval
Papua New Guinea	235
Zimbabwe	223
21 August – (Australia) WEP Harris Oval
Nepal	219/7
Namibia	180

13th place play-off
23 August – (Australia) Peter Burge Oval
Papua New Guinea	89
Nepal	90/4
15th place play-off
23 August – (Australia) WEP Harris Oval
Zimbabwe	236/9
Namibia	166

==== 9th place play-off quarter-finals ====
19 August
09:30
Scorecard

Papua New Guinea; 239/5 (50 overs)	v	Afghanistan; 244/6 (49 overs)
Christopher Kent 105* (117) °Aftab Alam 2/41 (10 overs)		Mohibullah Oryakhel 58* (47); Charles Amini 2/29 (8 overs)

Afghanistan Under-19s won by 4 wickets
Allan Border Field, Brisbane, Australia
Umpires: Ian Ramage (Sco) and Richard Smith (Ire)
Player of the match: Christopher Kent (PNG)

- Papua New Guinea Under-19s won the toss and elected to bat.

19 August
09:30
Scorecard

Scotland; 241/7 (50 overs)	v	Zimbabwe; 200/9 (50 overs)
Nicholas Farrar 58 (83); Luke Jongwe 2/31 (9 overs)		Ryan Burl 52 (52); Ruaidhri Smith 2/23 (10 overs)

Scotland Under-19s won by 41 runs
Peter Burge Oval, Redland City, Australia
Umpires: Mark Hawthorne (Ire) and Buddhi Pradhan (Nep)
Player of the match: Nicholas Farrar (Sco)

- Zimbabwe Under-19s won the toss and elected to field.

20 August
09:30
Scorecard

Nepal; 79 (27.3 overs)	v	Sri Lanka; 80/2 (20.4 overs)
Subash Khakurel 22 (30); Tharindu Kaushal 3/13 (4.3 overs)		Shehan Fernando 48 (49); Prithu Baskota 1/10 (7 overs)

Sri Lanka Under-19s won by 8 wickets
Peter Burge Oval, Redland City, Australia
Umpires: Owen Chirombe (Zim) and Courtney Young (Cay)
Player of the match: Shehan Fernando (SL)

- Nepal Under-19s won the toss and elected to bat.

20 August
09:30
Scorecard

Namibia; 128/9 (50 overs)	v	Ireland; 129/6 (24.3 overs)
Christopher Coombe 28 (51); Graeme McCarter 4/32 (10 overs)		Ryan Hunter 42 (37); Jason Davidson 3/45 (9.3 overs)

Ireland Under-19s won by 4 wickets
University of Queensland, WEP Harris Oval, St Lucia, Australia
Umpires: Ahsan Raza (Pak) and Sarika Prasad (Sin)
Player of the match: Graeme McCarter (Ire)

- Namibia Under-19s won the toss and elected to bat.

==== 9th place play-off semi-finals ====
21 August
09:30
Scorecard

Afghanistan; 336/7 (50 overs)	v	Scotland; 210 (39.4 overs)
Javed Ahmadi 134 (111); Patrick Sadler 3/69 (10 overs)		Matthew Cross 37 (32); Aftab Alam 3/63 (9.4 overs)

Afghanistan Under-19s won by 126 runs
Allan Border Field, Brisbane, Australia
Umpires: Mark Hawthorne (Ire) and Sarika Prasad (Sin)
Player of the match: Javed Ahmadi (Afg)

- Afghanistan Under-19s won the toss and elected to bat.

22 August
09:30
Scorecard

Sri Lanka; 258 (49.3 overs)	v	Ireland; 149 (37.5 overs)
Sandun Weerakkody 112* (121); George Dockrell 3/39 (10 overs)		Shane Getkate 46 (57); Lahiru Madushanka 6/24 (7.5 overs)

Sri Lanka Under-19s won by 109 runs
Allan Border Field, Brisbane, Australia
Umpires: Ahsan Raza (Pak) and Ian Ramage (Sco)
Player of the match: Lahiru Madushanka (SL)

- Sri Lanka Under-19s won the toss and elected to bat.

==== 13th place play-off semi-finals ====
21 August
09:30
Scorecard

Papua New Guinea; 235 (50 overs)	v	Zimbabwe; 223 (49.1 overs)
Charles Amini 63 (71); Luke Jongwe 3/38 (7 overs)		Luke Masasire 68 (62); Kabua Vagi Morea 3/26 (10 overs)

Papua New Guinea Under-19s won by 12 runs
Peter Burge Oval, Redland City, Australia
Umpires: Buddhi Pradhan (Nep) and Courtney Young (Cay)
Player of the match: Charles Amini (PNG)

- Papua New Guinea Under-19s won the toss and elected to bat.

21 August
09:30
Scorecard

Nepal; 219/7 (50 overs)	v	Namibia; 180 (46.3 overs)
Pradeep Airee 98* (76); Christopher Coombe 3/61 (10 overs)		Stephan Baard 56 (86); Bhuwan Karki 5/21 (7.3 overs)

Nepal Under-19s won by 39 runs
University of Queensland, WEP Harris Oval, St Lucia, Australia
Umpires: Owen Chirombe (Zim) and Richard Smith (Ire)
Player of the match: Bhuwan Karki (Nep)

- Nepal Under-19s won the toss and elected to bat.

==== 15th place play-off ====
23 August
09:30
Scorecard

Zimbabwe; 236/9 (50 overs)	v	Namibia; 166 (40.5 overs)
Ryan Burl 78 (73); Jason Davidson 3/26 (9 overs)		Gerhard Erasmus 32 (52); Luke Jongwe 3/29 (6.5 overs)

Zimbabwe Under-19s won by 70 runs
University of Queensland, WEP Harris Oval, St Lucia, Australia
Umpires: Richard Smith (Ire) and Courtney Young (Cay)
Player of the match: Ryan Burl (Zim)

- Zimbabwe Under-19s won the toss and elected to bat.

==== 13th place play-off ====
23 August
09:30
Scorecard

Papua New Guinea; 89 (33.2 overs)	v	Nepal; 90/4 (18.5 overs)
Sese Bau 21 (32); Rahul Vishwakarma 6/3 (6.2 overs)		Naresh Budhayer 27 (37); Albert Geita 3/25 (5 overs)

Nepal Under-19s won by 6 wickets
Peter Burge Oval, Redland City, Australia
Umpires: Owen Chirombe (Zim) and Mark Hawthorne (Ire)
Player of the match: Rahul Vishwakarma (Nep)

- Papua New Guinea Under-19s won the toss and elected to bat.

==== 11th place play-off ====
24 August
09:30
Scorecard

Ireland; 182 (49.4 overs)	v	Scotland; 185/5 (41.4 overs)
Tyrone Kane 78 (121); Aman Bailwal 3/38 (9.4 overs)		Ross McLean 47 (79); Ben Wylie 2/24 (5 overs)

Scotland Under-19s won by 5 wickets
University of Queensland, WEP Harris Oval, St Lucia, Australia
Umpires: Ahsan Raza (Pak) and Buddhi Pradhan (Nep)
Player of the match: Ruaidhri Smith (Sco)

- Ireland Under-19s won the toss and elected to bat.

==== Plate Final ====
24 August
09:30
Scorecard

Afghanistan; 194/9 (50 overs)	v	Sri Lanka; 196/3 (39 overs)
Mohibullah Oryakhel 44 (64); Lahiru Madushanka 3/34 (9 overs)		Niroshan Dickwella 76* (87); Nasir Ahmadzai 1/19 (4 overs)

Sri Lanka Under-19s won by 7 wickets
Allan Border Field, Brisbane, Australia
Umpires: Sarika Prasad (Sin) and Ian Ramage (Sco)
Player of the match: Niroshan Dickwella (Sri)

- Afghanistan Under-19s won the toss and elected to bat.

=== Super League ===
Quarter-finals
19 Aug – (Australia) Tony Ireland Stadium
South Africa	244
England	141
19 Aug – (Australia) Endeavour Park 2
Bangladesh	171
Australia	172/5
20 Aug – (Australia) Tony Ireland Stadium
Pakistan	136
India	137/9
20 Aug – (Australia) Endeavour Park 1
West Indies	237
New Zealand	238/7

Semi-finals
21 Aug – (Australia) Tony Ireland Stadium
South Africa	191/8
Australia	193/6
23 Aug – (Australia) Tony Ireland Stadium
India	209/9
New Zealand	200/9

Final
26 Aug – (Australia) Tony Ireland Stadium
Australia	225/8
India	227/4
3rd place play-off
25 Aug – (Australia) Endeavour Park 1
New Zealand	90
South Africa	94/2

Quarter-finals

5th place play-off semi-finals
21 Aug – (Australia) Endeavour Park 2
Bangladesh	217/7
England	219/6
22 Aug – (Australia) Endeavour Park 1
West Indies	182
Pakistan	166

5th place play-off
24 Aug – (Australia) Endeavour Park 1
England	241/9
West Indies	228
7th place play-off
24 Aug – (Australia) Endeavour Park 2
Pakistan	235/8
Bangladesh	239/5

==== Quarter-finals ====
19 August
09:30
Scorecard

South Africa; 244 (50 overs)	v	England; 141 (40.3 overs)
Murray Coetzee 67 (83); Reece Topley 3/45 (10 overs)		Ben Foakes 54 (72); Prenelan Subrayen 4/24 (10 overs)

South Africa Under-19s won by 103 runs
Tony Ireland Stadium, Townsville, Australia
Umpires: S Ravi (Ind) and Paul Reiffel (Aus)
Player of the match: Prenelan Subrayen (SA)

- England Under-19s won the toss and elected to field.

19 August
09:30
Scorecard

Bangladesh; 171 (43 overs)	v	Australia; 172/5 (45.5 overs)
Soumya Sarkar 73 (80); Travis Head 3/30 (7 overs)		Will Bosisto 71* (134); Taskin Ahmed 2/31 (8 overs)

Australia Under-19s won by 5 wickets
Endeavour Park 2, Townsville, Australia
Umpires: Chris Gaffaney (NZ) and Peter Nero (WI)
Player of the match: Will Bosisto (Aus)

- Australia Under-19s won the toss and elected to field.

20 August
09:30
Scorecard

Pakistan; 136 (45.1 overs)	v	India; 137/9 (48 overs)
Babar Azam 50 (109); Sandeep Sharma 3/24 (8.1 overs)		Baba Aparajith 51 (97); Zia-ul-Haq 3/23 (10 overs)

India Under-19s won by 1 wicket.
Tony Ireland Stadium, Townsville, Australia
Umpires: Enamul Haque (Ban) and Richard Illingworth (Eng)
Player of the match: Baba Aparajith (Ind)

- Pakistan Under-19s won the toss and elected to bat.

20 August
09:30
Scorecard

West Indies; 237 (50 overs)	v	New Zealand; 238/7 (50 overs)
Akeal Hosein 54 (70); Matt Quinn 3/54 (10 overs)		Ben Horne 59 (71); Kyle Mayers 3/42 (9 overs)

New Zealand Under-19s won by 3 wickets.
Endeavour Park 1, Townsville, Australia
Umpires: Johan Cloete (SA) and Ranmore Martinesz (SL)
Player of the match: Ish Sodhi (NZ)

- New Zealand Under-19s won the toss and elected to field.

==== Semi-finals ====
21 August
09:30
Scorecard

South Africa; 191/8 (50 overs)	v	Australia; 193/6 (48.3 overs)
Murray Coetzee 50 (76); Mark Steketee 3/35 (10 overs)		Cameron Bancroft 66 (133); Lizaad Williams 3/40 (10 overs)

Australia Under-19s won by 4 wickets
Tony Ireland Stadium, Townsville, Australia
Umpires: Richard Illingworth (Eng) and Ranmore Martinesz (SL)
Player of the match: Cameron Bancroft (Aus)

- Australia Under-19s won the toss and elected to field

23 August
09:30
Scorecard

India; 209/9 (50 overs)	v	New Zealand; 200/9 (50 overs)
Prashant Chopra 52 (104); Ben Horne 3/28 (6 overs)		Cameron Fletcher 53 (89); Harmeet Singh 2/30 (10 overs)

India Under-19s won by 9 runs
Tony Ireland Stadium, Townsville, Australia
Umpires: Johan Cloete (SA) and Paul Reiffel (Aus)
Player of the match: Baba Aparajith (Ind)

- New Zealand Under-19s won the toss and elected to field

==== 5th place play-off semi-finals ====
21 August
09:50
Scorecard

Bangladesh; 217/7 (50 overs)	v	England; 219/6 (48.2 overs)
Litton Das 102 (134); Reece Topley 5/32 (10 overs)		Ben Foakes 47 (39); Taskin Ahmed 2/66 (9.2 overs)

England Under-19s won by 4 wickets
Endeavour Park 2, Townsville, Australia
Umpires: Peter Nero (WI) and S Ravi (Ind)
Player of the match: Reece Topley (Eng)

- England Under-19s won the toss and elected to field

22 August
09:30
Scorecard

West Indies; 182 (49 overs)	v	Pakistan; 166 (48.3 overs)
Kraigg Brathwaite 39 (77); Mir Hamza 3/44 (10 overs)		Babar Azam 38 (76); Derone Davis 3/20 (10 overs)

West Indies Under-19s won by 16 runs
Endeavour Park 2, Townsville, Australia
Umpires: Enamul Haque (Ban) and Chris Gaffaney (NZ)
Player of the match: Derone Davis (WI)

- Pakistan Under-19s won the toss and elected to field

==== 7th place play-off ====
24 August
09:30
Scorecard

Pakistan; 235/8 (50 overs)	v	Bangladesh; 239/5 (46.2 overs)
Mohammad Nawaz 82 (86); Taskin Ahmed 3/80 (10 overs)		Anamul Haque 128 (112); Ehsan Adil 2/32 (10 overs)

Bangladesh Under-19s won by 5 wickets
Endeavour Park 2, Townsville, Australia
Umpires: Chris Gaffaney (NZ) and Peter Nero (WI)
Player of the match: Anamul Haque (Ban)

- Bangladesh Under-19s won the toss and elected to field

==== 5th place play-off ====
24 August
09:30
Scorecard

England; 241/9 (50 overs)	v	West Indies; 228 (48.3 overs)
Sam Wood 104 (111); Justin Greaves 3/38 (8 overs)		John Campbell 105 (133); Reece Topley 3/39 (8.3 overs)

England Under-19s won by 13 runs
Endeavour Park 1, Townsville, Australia
Umpires: Johan Cloete (SA) and S Ravi (Ind)
Player of the match: Sam Wood (Eng)

- West Indies Under-19s won the toss and elected to field

==== 3rd place play-off ====
25 August
09:30
Scorecard

New Zealand; 90 (36.5 overs)	v	South Africa; 94/2 (14.4 overs)
Connor Neynens 21* (70); David Rhoda 4/26 (9.5 overs)		Quinton de Kock 50 (43); Ish Sodhi 1/17 (3.4 overs)

South Africa Under-19s won by 8 wickets
Endeavour Park 1, Townsville, Australia
Umpires: Enamul Haque (Ban) and Paul Reiffel (Aus)
Player of the match: Calvin Savage (SA)

- New Zealand Under-19s won the toss and elected to bat

==== Final ====
26 August
09:30
Scorecard

Australia; 225/8 (50 overs)	v	India; 227/4 (47.4 overs)
Will Bosisto 87* (120); Sandeep Sharma 4/54 (10 overs)		Unmukt Chand 111* (130); Joel Paris 1/33 (10 overs)

India Under-19s won by 6 wickets
Tony Ireland Stadium, Townsville, Queensland
Umpires: Ranmore Martinesz (SL) and Richard Illingworth (Eng)
Player of the match: Unmukt Chand (Ind)

- India Under-19s won the toss and elected to field.

== Final standings ==
Position	Team
1	India
2	Australia
3	South Africa
4	New Zealand
5	England
6	West Indies
7	Bangladesh
8	Pakistan
9	Sri Lanka
10	Afghanistan
11	Scotland
12	Ireland
13	Nepal
14	Papua New Guinea
15	Zimbabwe
16	Namibia

- Qualify for the 2014 U-19 World Cup as full members.

== See also ==
- Cricket in Queensland
- ICC Under-19 Cricket World Cup
- International Cricket Council
