= 2012–13 NKP Salve Challenger Trophy =

NKP Salve Challenger Trophy 2012/13
- Date: 29th September – 2nd October 2012
- Location: Rajkot, Gujarat, India
- Result: Won by India B
Teams
India A	India B	Bengal
Captains
(India) Subramaniam Badrinath	(India) Cheteshwar Pujara	(India) Wriddhiman Saha
Most runs
Shikhar Dhawan (312)	Cheteshwar Pujara (361)	Wriddhiman Saha (181)
Most wickets
Ishant Sharma (4) Pragyan Ojha (4) Parvinder Awana (4)	Munaf Patel (4); Stuart Binny (4); Ravindra Jadeja (4)	Sandipan Das (5)

The 18th NKP Salve Challenger Trophy was a domestic cricket tournament that was held in Rajkot from 29 September to 2 October 2012. The series involved the domestic teams from India which were India A, India B, and Bengal. The tournament was won by India B who defeated India A by 139 runs.

== Squads ==
India A	India B	(India) Bengal
Subramaniam Badrinath (c); Parvinder Awana; Udit Birla; Shikhar Dhawan; Iqbal Abdulla; Dinesh Karthik (wk); Abhimanyu Mithun; Pragyan Ojha; Manish Pandey; Harshal Patel; Yusuf Pathan; Ajinkya Rahane; Robin Uthappa; Ishant Sharma	Cheteshwar Pujara (c); Srikkanth Anirudha; Baba Aparajith; Stuart Binny; Robin Bist; Harmeet Singh; Ravindra Jadeja; Kedar Jadhav; Praveen Kumar; Rohit Motwani (wk); Munaf Patel; Umesh Yadav; Murali Vijay; Sandeep Sharma	Wriddhiman Saha (c & wk); Jayojit Basu; Subhomoy Das; Debabrata Das; Shreevats Goswami (wk); Sayan Mondal; Arnab Nandi; Writam Porel; Veer Pratap Singh; Ravikant Singh; Sandipan Das; Sourav Sarkar; Iresh Saxena; Alok Sharma; Laxmi Ratan Shukla

== Matches ==
=== Group stage ===
Pos	Team	Pld	W	L	NR	Pts	NRR
1	India A	2	2	0	0	8	0.840
2	India B	2	1	1	0	4	0.170
3	(India) Bengal	2	0	2	0	0	−1.000

Source: 'Points Table'

29 September 2012

Bengal (India); 193 (41.1 overs)	v	India A 196/2 (37.2 overs)
Wriddhiman Saha 65 (72); Ishant Sharma 4/29 (9 overs)		Shikhar Dhawan 99* (112); Sourav Sarkar 1/33 (7 overs)

India A won by 8 wickets
Saurashtra Cricket Association Stadium, Rajkot
Umpires: Sundaram Ravi (IND) and Vineet Kulkarni (IND)
Player of the match: Shikhar Dhawan (India A)

- Bengal won the toss and elected to bat.
- Points: India A 4, Bengal 0

30 September 2012

India A 335/4 (50 overs)	v	India B 331/5 (50 overs)
Shikhar Dhawan 152 (139); Umesh Yadav 2/83 (11 overs)		Cheteshwar Pujara 158* (126); Parvinder Awana 3/69 (10 overs)

India A won by 4 runs.
Saurashtra Cricket Association Stadium, Rajkot
Umpires: Chettithody Shamshuddin (IND) and Sudhir Asnani (IND)
Player of the match: Cheteshwar Pujara (India B)

- India A won the toss and elected to bat.
- Points: India A 4, India B 0

1 October 2012

India B 328/8 (50 overs)	v	(India) Bengal; 307 (49.4 overs)
Cheteshwar Pujara 124* (130); Sandipan Das 5/51 (10 overs)		Wriddhiman Saha 116 (93); Munaf Patel 4/39 (11 overs)

India B won by 21 runs.
Saurashtra Cricket Association Stadium, Rajkot
Umpires: Vineet Kulkarni (IND) and Sudhir Asnani (IND)
Player of the match: Cheteshwar Pujara (India B)

- India B won the toss and elected to bat.
- Points: India B 4, Bengal 0

=== Final ===
2 October 2012

India B 356/3 (50 overs)	v	India A 217 (42.1 overs)
Manish Pandey 155 (121); Pragyan Ojha 1/64 (12 overs)		Ajinkya Rahane 64 (88); Stuart Binny 3/26 (6.1 overs)

India B won by 139 runs
Saurashtra Cricket Association Stadium, Rajkot
Umpires: Sundaram Ravi (IND) and Sudhir Asnani (IND)
Player of the match: Murali Vijay (India B)

- India B won the toss and elected to bat.
- India B won the NKP Salve Challenger Trophy 2012-13.
