= Pakistan women's cricket team in Australia in 2014 =

Pakistani women's tour of Australia in 2014
| | Australia women | Pakistan women |
- Dates: 21 August – 5 September
| Captains | Meg Lanning | Sana Mir |

One Day International series
- Results: Australia women won the 4-match series 4–0
| Most runs | Nicole Bolton (282) | Bismah Maroof (240) |
| Most wickets | Jess Jonassen (10) | Sana Mir (8) |
- Player of the series: Nicole Bolton (Aus)

Twenty20 International series
- Results: Australia women won the 4-match series 4–0
| Most runs | Elyse Villani (181) | Nain Abidi (90) |
| Most wickets | Erin Osborne (7) | Asmavia Iqbal (3); Sania Khan (3) |
- Player of the series: Elyse Villani (Aus)

Pakistani women's cricket team toured Australia in season 2014. The tour consisted of a series of 5 One day internationals and 3 Twenty20 internationals. The first three of the five ODIs formed a part of the ongoing 2014–16 ICC Women's Championship. Australians won both the series by 5-0 and 3-0.

== Squads ==
| ODIs | | T20Is | |
| Australia | Pakistan | Australia | Pakistan |
|---|---|---|---|
| Meg Lanning (c); Alex Blackwell (v/c); Kristen Beams; Nicole Bolton; Jess Cameron; Sarah Coyte; Rene Farrell; Alyssa Healy (wk); Julie Hunter; Jess Jonassen; Erin Osborne; Ellyse Perry; Megan Schutt | Sana Mir (c); Bismah Maroof (v/c); Aliya Riaz; Asmavia Iqbal; Javeria Khan; Maham Tariq; Marina Iqbal; Nain Abidi; Nida Dar; Qanita Jalil; Sadia Yousuf; Sania Khan; Sidra Nawaz (wk); Sumaiya Siddiqi | Meg Lanning (c); Alex Blackwell (v/c); ~~Nicole Bolton~~^{Withdrawn}; ~~Jess Cameron~~^{Withdrawn}; Sarah Coyte; Rene Farrell; Alyssa Healy (wk); Julie Hunter; Emma Inglis (wk); Jess Jonassen; Delissa Kimmince; Erin Osborne; Ellyse Perry; Megan Schutt; Elyse Villani | Sana Mir (c); Bismah Maroof (v/c); Aliya Riaz; Asmavia Iqbal; Javeria Khan; Maham Tariq; Marina Iqbal; Nain Abidi; Nida Dar; Qanita Jalil; Sadia Yousuf; Sania Khan; Sidra Nawaz (wk); Sumaiya Siddiqi |

== ODI series ==
=== 1st ODI ===
ICC Women's Championship
21 August 2014
09:30 AEST
(UTC+10:00)
Scorecard

| Pakistan; 157 (50 overs) | v | Australia; 163/6 (36.1 overs) |
| Bismah Maroof 53 (115); Julie Hunter 2/26 (9 overs) | | Jess Cameron 58* (61); Sana Mir 3/27 (9 overs) |

Australia Women won by 4 wickets
Peter Burge Oval, Brisbane
Umpires: Gerard Abood (Aus) and Sam Nogajski (Aus)
Player of the match: Jess Cameron (Aus)

- Pakistan Women won the toss and elected to bat.
- Maham Tariq and Sidra Nawaz (Pak) made their ODI debut.
- ICC Women's Championship points: Australia Women 2, Pakistan Women 0

=== 2nd ODI ===
ICC Women's Championship
23, 24 August 2014
09:30 AEST
(UTC+10:00)
Scorecard

| Pakistan; 121/8 (25 overs) | v | Australia; 124/5 (24.3 overs) |
| Javeria Khan 46 (47); Jess Jonassen 4/15 (5 overs) | | Alex Blackwell 39* (49); Sana Mir 2/27 (5 overs) |

Australia Women won by 5 wickets
Peter Burge Oval, Brisbane
Umpires: Gerard Abood (Aus) and Geoff Joshua (Aus)
Player of the match: Jess Jonassen (Aus)

- Australia Women won the toss and elected to field.
- Match original scheduled date (22-Aug) was called off due rain, being moved to the reserve day (23-Aug).
- Rain delayed the start of play on the reserve day, match was reduced to 25 overs per side.
- Aliya Riaz (Pak) made her ODI debut.
- ICC Women's Championship points: Australia Women 2, Pakistan Women 0

=== 3rd ODI ===
ICC Women's Championship
26 August 2014
09:30 AEST
(UTC+10:00)
Scorecard

| Pakistan; 189/8 (50 overs) | v | Australia; 190/2 (33 overs) |
| Nain Abidi 43 (52); Jess Jonassen 3/37 (9 overs) | | Nicole Bolton 81* (93); Asmavia Iqbal 1/47 (10 overs) |

Australia Women won by 8 wickets
Peter Burge Oval, Brisbane
Umpires: Geoff Joshua (Aus) and Sam Nogajski (Aus)
Player of the match: Nicole Bolton (Aus)

- Pakistan Women won the toss and elected to bat.
- Kristen Beams (Aus) made her ODI debut.
- ICC Women's Championship points: Australia Women 2, Pakistan Women 0

=== 4th ODI ===
28 August 2014
09:30 AEST
(UTC+10:00)
Scorecard

| Australia; 220/9 (50 overs) | v | Pakistan; 183 (49.4 overs) |
| Erin Osborne 47* (51); Sana Mir 3/44 (10 overs) | | Javeria Khan 54 (84); Sarah Coyte 3/32 (9 overs) |

Australia Women won by 37 runs
Peter Burge Oval, Brisbane
Umpires: Gerard Abood (Aus) and Sam Nogajski (Aus)
Player of the match: Erin Osborne (Aus)

- Australia Women won the toss and elected to bat.

== T20I series ==
=== 1st T20I ===
30 August 2014
13:00 AEST
(UTC+10:00)
Scorecard

| Pakistan; 92 (20 overs) | v | Australia; 95/1 (12.3 overs) |
| Marina Iqbal 22 (28); Erin Osborne 4/19 (4 overs) | | Elyse Villani 58* (40); Nida Dar 1/15 (2.3 overs) |

Australia Women won by 9 wickets
Kerrydale Oval, Gold Coast
Umpires: Gerard Abood (Aus) and Geoff Joshua (Aus)
Player of the match: Erin Osborne (Aus)

- Pakistan Women won the toss and elected to bat.
- Aliya Riaz and Sidra Nawaz (Pak) made their T20I debut.

=== 2nd T20I ===
31 August 2014
13:00 AEST
(UTC+10:00)
Scorecard

| Australia; 149/5 (20 overs) | v | Pakistan; 86/8 (20 overs) |
| Delissa Kimmince 43 (48); Asmavia Iqbal 2/24 (4 overs) | | Nain Abidi 21 (29); Rene Farrell 2/14 (3 overs) |

Australia Women won by 63 runs
Kerrydale Oval, Gold Coast
Umpires: Geoff Joshua (Aus) and Sam Nogajski (Aus)
Player of the match: Delissa Kimmince (Aus)

- Australia Women won the toss and elected to bat.

=== 3rd T20I ===
3 September 2014
13:00 AEST
(UTC+10:00)
Scorecard

| Pakistan; 84/9 (20 overs) | v | Australia; 87/2 (11.4 overs) |
| Nain Abidi 30* (42); Delissa Kimmince 2/17 (4 overs) | | Elyse Villani 50 (39); Maham Tariq 1/11 (2 overs) |

Australia Women won by 8 wickets
Kerrydale Oval, Gold Coast
Umpires: Gerard Abood (Aus) and Sam Nogajski (Aus)
Player of the match: Elyse Villani (Aus)

- Pakistan Women won the toss and elected to bat.
- Kristen Beams (Aus) and Maham Tariq (Pak) made their T20I debut.

=== 4th T20I ===
5 September 2014
13:00 AEST
(UTC+10:00)
Scorecard

| Australia; 139/3 (20 overs) | v | Pakistan; 119/6 (20 overs) |
| Meg Lanning 46* (28); Anam Amin 1/18 (3 overs) | | Bismah Maroof 39 (45); Rene Farrell 2/20 (4 overs) |

Australia Women won by 20 runs
Kerrydale Oval, Gold Coast
Umpires: Gerard Abood (Aus) and Geoff Joshua (Aus)
Player of the match: Meg Lanning (Aus)

- Australia Women won the toss and elected to bat.
