= Harry Chamberlain =

New Zealand cricketer (born 1995)

Personal information
- Full name: Harry John Chamberlain
- Born: 16 November 1995 (age 30); Christchurch, New Zealand
- Batting: Right-handed
- Role: Batsman

Domestic team information
- Years: Team
- 2016–17 to present: Canterbury

Career statistics
Competition	FC	LA	T20
Matches	6	1	8
Runs scored	190	4	61
Batting average	21.11	–	7.62
100s/50s	1/0	0/0	0/0
Top score	132	4*	19
Catches/stumpings	2/–	0/–	2/–
- Source: Cricinfo, 12 March 2026

Harry John Chamberlain (born 16 November 1995) is a New Zealand cricketer. He made his List A debut for Canterbury on 25 January 2017 in the 2016–17 Ford Trophy. He made his first-class debut on 27 March 2021, for Canterbury in the 2020–21 Plunket Shield season.

Chamberlain was born in Christchurch, where he attended Christ's College. A middle-order batsman, he scored a century in his second first-class match, in the final round of the 2020–21 Plunket Shield. He has played for Canterbury Country in Hawke Cup cricket since 2014. He captained the team to the title in 2019–20 and 2025–26.
