= Aaron Barnes (cricketer) =

New Zealand cricketer (born 1971)

Aaron Craig Barnes (born 21 December 1971 in Tūrangi) is a former New Zealand cricketer who played for the Auckland between 1993 and 2005. In 2003–04 he and Matthew Horne added 347* for the fifth wicket against Northern Districts at Eden Park, a club record.

== See also ==
- List of Auckland representative cricketers
