= Andre Engelbrecht =

Namibian cricketer

Personal information
- Full name: Andre Engelbrecht
- Born: 15 November 1991 (age 34); South Africa
- Batting: Right-handed
- Bowling: Leg break

Domestic team information
- Years: Team
- 2011/12: Namibia

Career statistics
Competition	First-class	Twenty20
Matches	2	8
Runs scored	21	5
Batting average	10.50	2.50
100s/50s	–/–	–/–
Top score	13	4
Balls bowled	60	114
Wickets	0	5
Bowling average	–	30.60
5 wickets in innings	–	–
10 wickets in match	–	–
Best bowling	–	2/14
Catches/stumpings	1/–	2/–
- Source: Cricinfo, 6 February 2022

Andre Engelbrecht (born 15 November 1991) is a South African-born Namibian former first-class cricketer.

Engelbrecht was member of the Namibia Under-19 squad for the 2012 Under-19 Cricket World Cup, making four appearances in the tournament. Prior to playing in the Under-19 World Cup, Engelbrecht made two appearances in first-class cricket for the Namibian senior team against Northerns and Gauteng in the 2011–12 CSA 3-Day Cup. In October 2011, he played in two Twenty20 matches against Scotland, before making a further six appearances in the same season in the CSA Provincial T20 Cup. He took 5 wickets in his eight Twenty20 appearances, at an average of 30.60 and best figures of 2 for 14.
