= Phil Horne =

New Zealand cricketer (born 1960)

Personal information
- Full name: Philip Andrew Horne
- Born: 21 January 1960 (age 66); Upper Hutt, New Zealand
- Batting: Left-handed
- Relatives: Noelene Swinton (mother); Matt Horne (brother); Ben Horne (son)

International information
- National side: New Zealand (1987–1990)
- Test debut (cap 162): 12 March 1987 v West Indies
- Last Test: 26 October 1990 v Pakistan
- ODI debut (cap 55): 18 March 1987 v West Indies
- Last ODI: 31 October 1987 v India

Career statistics
Competition	Test	ODI	FC	LA
Matches	4	4	53	34
Runs scored	71	50	2,879	752
Batting average	10.14	12.50	34.27	26.85
100s/50s	0/0	0/0	5/17	1/3
Top score	27	18	209	120*
Balls bowled	0	0	30	0
Wickets	–	–	1	–
Bowling average	–	–	16.00	–
5 wickets in innings	–	–	0	–
10 wickets in match	–	–	0	–
Best bowling	–	–	1/5	–
Catches/stumpings	3/–	0/–	42/–	13/–
- Source: CricInfo, 4 May 2017

Philip Andrew Horne (born 21 January 1960) is a former New Zealand cricketer who played in 4 Tests and 4 ODIs from 1987 to 1990. He also represented New Zealand in badminton at the 1986 Commonwealth Games.

Horne was born in Upper Hutt on 21 January 1960, the son of Noelene Rae Horne (née Swinton), who represented New Zealand in the high jump, and Valentine Arthur Horne, who managed the New Zealand badminton team at the 1966 British Empire and Commonwealth Games. His younger brother Matt also played international cricket for New Zealand.
