= Rhys Phillips =

New Zealand cricketer (born 1988)

Personal information
- Full name: Rhys Matthew Phillips
- Born: 6 May 1988 (age 38); Dunedin, Otago, New Zealand
- Batting: Right-handed
- Bowling: Right-arm leg break

Domestic team information
- Years: Team
- 2012/13: Mid Canterbury
- 2014/15–2016/17: Otago
- Source: ESPNcricinfo, 21 May 2016

Rhys Matthew Phillips (born 6 May 1988) is a New Zealand cricketer. He played first-class cricket for Otago between the 2014–15 season and 2016–17.

Phillips was born at Dunedin in 1988. He played age-group and Second XI cricket for Otago from the 2010–11 season and played for Mid Canterbury in the Hawke Cup during 2012–13, before making his senior representative debut for Otago in March 2015. After three end of season matches for the provincial side the end of the 2014–15 season, Phillips played three more Plunket Shield matches the following season and four in 2016–17, although he "struggled to hit a good length" and was "expensive" during his final season with the side. He made his Twenty20 cricket debut on 1 January 2017 in the 2016–17 Super Smash, the only senior Twenty20 match of his career.

In 10 first-class matches Phillips took 25 wickets with his leg breaks and scored 76 runs. In his only T20 match he took a single wicket and did not bat.
