= Peter Bocock =

New Zealand cricketer (born 1991)

Personal information
- Full name: Peter David Bocock
- Born: 12 April 1991 (age 35); Te Awamutu, New Zealand
- Source: ESPNcricinfo, 29 December 2016

Peter Bocock (born 12 April 1991) is a New Zealand cricketer. He made his Twenty20 debut for Northern Districts on 27 December 2016 in the 2016–17 Super Smash. He made his List A debut for Northern Districts on 15 January 2017 in the 2016–17 Ford Trophy. He made his first-class debut for Northern Districts in the 2017–18 Plunket Shield season on 17 March 2018. In June 2018, he was awarded a contract with Northern Districts for the 2018–19 season.
