= 2016–17 Super Smash =

Cricket tournament

- Dates: 4 December 2016 – 7 January 2017
- Administrator: New Zealand Cricket
- Cricket format: Twenty20 cricket
- Tournament format(s): Round-robin and knockout
- Champions: Wellington Firebirds (2nd title)
- Participants: 6
- Matches: 32
- Most runs: Glenn Phillips (369)
- Most wickets: Seth Rance (15); Brent Arnel (15)
- Official website: Super Smash

The 2016–17 McDonald's Super Smash (named after the competition's sponsor McDonald's) was the twelfth season of the Men's Super Smash Twenty20 cricket tournament in New Zealand. The competition was run from 4 December 2016 to 7 January 2017. The previous edition was known as the Georgie Pie Super Smash. The Auckland Aces were the defending champions.

The match between Otago Volts and Central Stags on 21 December 2016 set a new record for the highest aggregate total in a T20 fixture, with a total of 497 runs scored.

The Wellington Firebirds beat Canterbury Kings by three wickets in the elimination final, and faced Central Stags in the final on 7 January 2017. The Wellington Firebirds won the final by 14 runs.

== Teams ==
Team	Coach	Captain	Overseas players
Auckland Aces	Mark O'Donnell	Rob Nicol	Tymal Mills; Mark Chapman
Northern Knights	James Pamment	Dean Brownlie	Nathan Reardon; Ben Laughlin
Central Stags	Heinrich Malan	Will Young	Mahela Jayawardene
Wellington Firebirds	Bruce Edgar	Hamish Marshall	Jade Dernbach; Evan Gulbis
Canterbury Kings	Gary Stead	Anderew Ellis	Ben Hilfenhaus; Shane Watson
Otago Volts	Rob Walter	Hamish Rutherford	Christi Viljoen

== Points table ==
Pos	Team	Pld	W	L	NR	Pts	NRR
1	Central Stags	10	7	2	1	30	0.937
2	Wellington Firebirds	10	5	5	0	20	0.114
3	Canterbury Kings	10	5	5	0	20	−0.217
4	Auckland Aces	10	5	5	0	20	−0.227
5	Northern Knights	10	4	5	1	18	−0.043
6	Otago Volts	10	3	7	0	12	−0.417

Teams qualified for the play-offs

== Fixtures ==
=== Round-robin ===
4 December 2016
Scorecard

Central Stags; 198/6 (20 overs)	v	Canterbury Kings; 77/3 (8.5 overs)
Tom Bruce 39 (24); Andrew Ellis 3/49 (4 overs)		Andrew Ellis 27* (17); Ben Wheeler 2/29 (3 overs)

Central Districts won by 7 runs (D/L method)
Pukekura Park, New Plymouth
Umpires: Tony Gillies and R. G. Hooper

- Central Districts won the toss and elected to bat.
- Jeremy Benton and Kyle Jamieson (Canterbury) both made their T20 debuts.

4 December 2016
Scorecard

Northern Knights; 142 (19.3 overs)	v	Wellington Firebirds; 135/9 (20 overs)
Nathan Reardon 34 (24); Brent Arnel 3/21 (4 overs)		Tom Blundell 63 (42); Daryl Mitchell 4/35 (4 overs)

Northern Districts won by 7 runs
Seddon Park, Hamilton
Umpires: Ashley Mehrotra and Derek Walker

- Wellington won the toss and elected to field.
- Joe Carter and Zak Gibson (Northern Districts) both made their T20 debuts.

4 December 2016
Scorecard

Auckland Aces; 198/5 (20 overs)	v	Otago Volts; 176/7 (20 overs)
Mark Chapman 76 (32); Bradley Scott 2/34 (4 overs)		Derek de Boorder 44 (35); Tarun Nethula 2/28 (4 overs)

Auckland won by 22 runs
Eden Park No. 2, Auckland
Umpires: Shaun Haig and Wayne Knights

- Otago won the toss and elected to field.
- Michael Barry, Michael Guptill-Bunce, Glenn Phillips and Sean Solia (Auckland) all made their T20 debuts.

10 December 2016 (D/N)
Scorecard

Central Stags; 137/6 (20 overs)	v	Northern Knights
Dean Brownlie 43 (31); Seth Rance 3/30 (4 overs)

No result
Yarrow Stadium, New Plymouth
Umpires: Chris Brown and Shaun Haig

- Central Districts won the toss and elected to bat.
- Only 20 overs of play was possible due to rain.

11 December 2016
Scorecard

Canterbury Kings; 133/6 (20 overs)	v	Auckland Aces; 134/4 (19 overs)
Cam Fletcher 43 (44); Mark Chapman 3/22 (4 overs)		Glenn Phillips 50 (50); Ed Nuttall 1/16 (3 overs)

Auckland won by 6 wickets
Hagley Oval, Christchurch
Umpires: Billy Bowden and Tim Parlane

- Canterbury won the toss and elected to bat.
- Ben Horne (Auckland) made his T20 debut.

14 December 2016 (D/N)
Scorecard

Otago Volts; 177/5 (15 overs)	v	Northern Knights; 175/9 (15 overs)
Neil Broom 57 (35); Zak Gibson 1/27 (2 overs)		Dean Brownlie 52 (26); Warren Barnes 3/45 (3 overs)

Otago won by 2 runs
University Oval, Dunedin
Umpires: John Bromley and Tony Gillies

- Otago won the toss and elected to bat.

15 December 2016 (D/N)
Scorecard

Canterbury Kings; 166/5 (20 overs)	v	Wellington Firebirds; 166/7 (20 overs)
Henry Nicholls 66* (40); Jeetan Patel 1/21 (4 overs)		Luke Ronchi 58* (31); Todd Astle 2/24 (4 overs)

Match tied
(Canterbury won the one-over eliminator)
Hagley Oval, Christchurch
Umpires: Chris Brown and Wayne Knights

16 December 2016 (D/N)
Scorecard

Wellington Firebirds; 199/4 (20 overs)	v	Canterbury Kings; 190/4 (20 overs)
Henry Nicholls 67 (31); Grant Elliott 2/36 (4 overs)		Hamish Marshall 59 (35); Todd Astle 2/36 (4 overs)

Canterbury won by 9 runs
Basin Reserve, Wellington
Umpires: Phil Jones and Tim Parlane

16 December 2016 (D/N)
Scorecard

Central Stags; 166/5 (20 overs)	v	Otago Volts; 161/9 (20 overs)
Mahela Jayawardene 62 (44); James Neesham 2/24 (4 overs)		James Neesham 34 (24); Seth Rance 2/23 (4 overs)

Central Districts won by 5 runs
McLean Park, Napier
Umpires: Billy Bowden and R. G. Hooper

- Blair Tickner (Central Districts) made his T20 debut.

17 December 2016 (D/N)
Scorecard

Auckland Aces; 186/6 (20 overs)	v	Northern Knights; 148/6 (20 overs)
Rob Nicol 55 (47); Ish Sodhi 2/26 (4 overs)		Daryl Mitchell 37* (22); Tarun Nethula 2/20 (4 overs)

Auckland won by 38 runs
Seddon Park, Hamilton
Umpires: Chris Brown and Shaun Haig

- Northern Districts won the toss and elected to field.

18 December 2016
Scorecard

Central Stags; 181/5 (20 overs)	v	Wellington Firebirds; 172/6 (20 overs)
Tom Bruce 74 (41); Grant Elliott 2/34 (4 overs)		Hamish Marshall 52 (37); George Worker 2/25 (4 overs)

Central Districts won by 9 runs
Saxton Oval, Nelson
Umpires: John Dempsey and Tim Parlane

- Wellington won the toss and elected to field.

18 December 2016
Scorecard

Northern Knights; 157/5 (20 overs)	v	Otago Volts; 158/2 (17.3 overs)
Tim Seifert 41 (31); Neil Wagner 3/22 (4 overs)		Neil Broom 54* (41); Scott Kuggeleijn 1/17 (2.3 overs)

Otago won by 8 wickets
Bay Oval, Mount Maunganui
Umpires: Chris Brown and Wayne Knights

- Northern Districts won the toss and elected to bat.

18 December 2016 (D/N)
Scorecard

Canterbury Kings; 150 (19.5 overs)	v	Auckland Aces; 156/5 (18.2 overs)
Cam Fletcher 37 (25); Tarun Nethula 4/18 (4 overs)		Colin de Grandhomme 72* (35); Edward Nuttall 3/17 (4 overs)

Auckland won by 5 wickets
Eden Park No 2, Auckland
Umpires: John Bromley and Ashley Mehrotra

- Canterbury won the toss and elected to bat.

21 December 2016 (D/N)
Scorecard

Otago Volts; 249/3 (20 overs)	v	Central Stags; 248/4 (20 overs)
Hamish Rutherford 106 (50); Seth Rance 2/54 (4 overs)		Mahela Jayawardene 116 (56); James Neesham 2/37 (4 overs)

Otago won by 1 run
Pukekura Park, New Plymouth
Umpires: Ashley Mehrotra and Derek Walker

- Otago won the toss and elected to bat.
- This match set a new record for the highest aggregate run total in a T20 fixture (497).

22 December 2016 (D/N)
Scorecard

Wellington Firebirds; 173/5 (20 overs)	v	Auckland Aces; 140 (19.2 overs)
Luke Ronchi 79 (39); Colin de Grandhomme 1/10 (2 overs)		Colin Munro 38 (44); Anurag Verma 3/28 (4 overs)

Wellington won by 33 runs
Basin Reserve, Wellington
Umpires: John Dempsey and Phil Jones

- Wellington won the toss and elected to bat.

23 December 2016 (D/N)
Scorecard

Canterbury Kings; 157/7 (20 overs)	v	Otago Volts; 150/9 (20 overs)
Peter Fulton 64 (43); James Neesham 2/25 (4 overs); Christi Viljoen 2/25 (4 overs)		Michael Bracewell 38 (33); Ben Hilfenhaus 5/23 (4 overs)

Canterbury won by 7 runs
Hagley Oval, Christchurch
Umpires: R. G. Hooper and Tim Parlane

- Canterbury won the toss and elected to bat.

23 December 2016 (D/N)
Scorecard

Northern Knights; 197/5 (20 overs)	v	Central Stags; 187/5 (20 overs)
Mitchell Santner 45* (21); Blair Tickner 2/38 (4 overs)		Mahela Jayawardene 64 (36); Mitchell Santner 1/12 (3 overs)

Northern Districts won by 10 runs
Seddon Park, Hamilton
Umpires: Billy Bowden and Shaun Haig

- Central Districts won the toss and elected to field.

24 December 2016
Scorecard

Wellington Firebirds; 182/9 (20 overs)	v	Auckland Aces; 180/5 (20 overs)
Michael Pollard 74 (36); Tymal Mills 2/21 (4 overs)		Rob Nicol 68 (52); Jeetan Patel 2/37 (4 overs)

Wellington won by 2 runs
Eden Park No 2, Auckland
Umpires: Tony Gillies and Derek Walker

- Wellington won the toss and elected to bat.

26 December 2016 (D/N)
Scorecard

Wellington Firebirds; 133 (19.4 overs)	v	Central Stags; 134/4 (16.3 overs)
Grant Elliott 39 (32); George Worker 3/26 (4 overs)		Mahela Jayawardene 40 (21); Brent Arnel 2/30 (4 overs)

Central Districts won by 6 wickets
Basin Reserve, Wellington
Umpires: Phil Jones and Ashley Mehrotra

- Wellington won the toss and elected to bat.

26 December 2016 (D/N)
Scorecard

Canterbury Kings; 152/8 (20 overs)	v	Otago Volts; 136/8 (20 overs)
Chad Bowes 54 (39); Neil Wagner 2/20 (4 overs)		Christi Viljoen 34* (22); Todd Astle 2/16 (4 overs)

Canterbury won by 16 runs
Molyneux Park, Alexandra
Umpires: Shaun Haig and Garth Stirrat

- Canterbury won the toss and elected to bat.
- Nathan Smith (Otago) made his T20 debut.

27 December 2016 (D/N)
Scorecard

Auckland Aces; 142/6 (20 overs)	v	Northern Knights; 143/1 (15.3 overs
Ben Horne 39 (27); Jono Boult 2/21 (4 overs)		Dean Brownlie 54 (34); Tymal Mills 1/26 (3 overs)

Northern Districts won by 9 wickets
Bay Oval, Mount Maunganui
Umpires: Billy Bowden and Derek Walker

- Auckland won the toss and elected to bat.
- Peter Bocock (Northern Districts) made his T20 debut.

28 December 2016
Scorecard

Otago Volts; 159/4 (20 overs)	v	Wellington Firebirds; 161/4 (16.5 overs)
Hamish Rutherford 47 (31); Hamish Bennett 2/29 (4 overs)		Hamish Marshall 100* (58); Sam Wells 2/35 (3 overs)

Wellington won by 6 wickets
Molyneux Park, Alexandra
Umpires: Shaun Haig and Garth Stirrat

- Otago won the toss and elected to bat.

29 December 2016 (D/N)
Scorecard

Canterbury Kings; 127/6 (20 overs)	v	Northern Knights; 129/4 (17.5 overs)
Todd Astle 37* (22); Scott Kuggeleijn 2/22 (4 overs)		BJ Watling 52* (48); Todd Astle 2/21 (4 overs)

Northern Districts won by 6 wickets
Bay Oval, Mount Maunganui
Umpires: Billy Bowden and Tony Gillies

- Canterbury won the toss and elected to bat.

29 December 2016 (D/N)
Scorecard

Central Stags; 213/5 (20 overs)	v	Auckland Aces; 149 (19.3 overs)
Ross Taylor 82* (41); Mark Chapman 2/36 (4 overs)		Sean Solia 40 (21); Blair Tickner 5/19 (4 overs)

Central Districts won by 64 runs
Pukekura Park, New Plymouth
Umpires: R. G. Hooper and Phil Jones

- Auckland won the toss and elected to field.

30 December 2016 (D/N)
Scorecard

Northern Knights; 175/2 (20 overs)	v	Wellington Firebirds; 179/1 (19 overs)
Corey Anderson 72* (41); Grant Elliott 1/22 (4 overs)		Michael Papps 80* (59); Daryl Mitchell 1/51 (4 overs)

Wellington won by 9 wickets
Seddon Park, Hamilton
Umpires: Tony Gillies and Shaun Haig

- Northern Districts won the toss and elected to bat.
- Peter Younghusband (Wellington) made his T20 debut.

31 December 2016 (D/N)
Scorecard

Central Stags; 190/8 (20 overs)	v	Canterbury Kings; 163 (19.1 overs)
Ross Taylor 80 (50); Edward Nuttall 3/25 (4 overs)		Cole McConchie 36 (20); Seth Rance 4/27 (3.1 overs)

Central Districts won by 27 runs
Yarrow Stadium, New Plymouth
Umpires: Shaun Haig and R. G. Hooper

- Central Districts won the toss and elected to bat.

1 January 2017
Scorecard

Otago Volts; 175/7 (20 overs)	v	Auckland Aces; 176/3 (18 overs)
Josh Finnie 45* (33); Colin de Grandhomme 2/32 (4 overs)		Glenn Phillips 62* (44); Ryan Duffy 1/18 (2 overs)

Auckland won by 7 wickets
University Oval, Dunedin
Umpires: Phil Jones and Derek Walker

- Otago won the toss and elected to bat.
- Ryan Duffy and Rhys Phillips (Otago) both made their T20 debuts.

2 January 2017 (D/N)
Scorecard

Canterbury Kings; 161/7 (20 overs)	v	Northern Knights; 152/7 (20 overs)
Tom Latham 82 (57); Nicholas Winter 2/30 (4 overs)		Scott Kuggeleijn 38 (21); Kyle Jamieson 2/20 (3 overs)

Canterbury won by 9 runs
Hagley Oval, Christchurch
Umpires: Billy Bowden and Tim Parlane

- Canterbury won the toss and elected to bat.

3 January 2017
Scorecard

Otago Volts; 48/1 (5 overs)	v	Wellington Firebirds; 48/6 (5 overs)
Hamish Rutherford 24* (14); Anurag Verma 1/11 (1 over)		Michael Pollard 14 (5); Christi Viljoen 2/9 (1 over)

Match tied
(Wellington won the one-over eliminator)
Basin Reserve, Wellington
Umpires: Phil Jones and Derek Walker

- Wellington won the toss and elected to field.

3 January 2017 (D/N)
Scorecard

Auckland Aces; 212/4 (20 overs)	v	Central Stags; 82/0 (8 overs)
Glenn Phillips 116* (57); Luke Feldman 1/11 (2 overs)		Mahela Jayawardene 45* (21)

Central Districts won by 11 runs (D/L method)
Eden Park No 2, Auckland
Umpires: Billy Bowden and Tim Parlane

- Auckland won the toss and elected to bat.
- Finn Allen (Auckland) made his T20 debut.

== Finals ==
Elimination Final
5 January 2017 (D/N)
Scorecard

Canterbury Kings; 151/7 (20 overs)	v	Wellington Firebirds; 155/7 (19.2 overs)
Chad Bowes 56 (41); Hamish Bennett 3/18 (4 overs)		Michael Papps 45 (28); Todd Astle 3/18 (4 overs)

Wellington won by 3 wickets
Basin Reserve, Wellington
Umpires: Billy Bowden and Tim Parlane

- Canterbury won the toss and elected to bat.

Final
7 January 2017 (D/N)
Scorecard

Wellington Firebirds; 172/7 (20 overs)	v	Central Stags; 158/8 (20 overs)
Matt Taylor 48* (25); Blair Tickner 4/34 (4 overs)		Josh Clarkson 53* (31); Brent Arnel 2/16 (4 overs)

Wellington won by 14 runs
Pukekura Park, New Plymouth
Umpires: Billy Bowden and Tim Parlane
