= 2016–17 Ford Trophy =

Cricket tournament

- Dates: 15 January – 18 February 2017
- Administrator(s): New Zealand Cricket
- Cricket format: List A cricket
- Tournament format(s): Round-robin and Knockout
- Champions: Canterbury (14th title)
- Participants: 6
- Most runs: George Worker (659)
- Most wickets: Scott Kuggeleijn (17)
- Official website: www.blackcaps.co.nz

The 2016–17 Ford Trophy was the 46th season of the official List A cricket tournament in New Zealand, and the sixth in a sponsorship deal between New Zealand Cricket and Ford Motor Company. The competition ran from 15 January to 18 February 2017. The final was played between Canterbury and Wellington. Canterbury won the final by 28 runs with Peter Fulton scoring the fastest century in a List A cricket match in New Zealand.

== Points table ==
Pos	Team	Pld	W	L	NR	BP	Pts	NRR
1	Wellington	8	5	1	2	1	25	0.110
2	Canterbury	8	4	3	1	1	19	−0.118
3	Central Districts	8	3	4	1	2	16	0.823
4	Northern Districts	8	3	5	0	3	15	−0.307
5	Auckland	8	3	4	1	1	15	0.001
6	Otago	8	3	4	1	1	15	−0.448

Teams qualified for the finals

== Fixtures ==
=== Round 1 ===
15 January 2017
Scorecard

Central Stags; 296/6 (50 overs)	v	Canterbury; 297/8 (49.2 overs)
George Worker 90 (109); Matt Henry 2/47 (10 overs)		Todd Astle 60 (56); Ben Wheeler 4/51 (10 overs)

Canterbury won by 2 wickets
Mainpower Oval, Rangiora
Umpires: Shaun Haig and Derek Walker

- Central Districts won the toss and elected to bat.
- Jack Boyle (Canterbury) made his List A debut.

15 January 2017
Scorecard

Otago Volts; 302 (50 overs)	v	Wellington Firebirds; 304/7 (48.1 overs)
James Neesham 60 (63); Anurag Verma 3/46 (10 overs)		Luke Woodcock 92 (108); Anaru Kitchen 4/49 (10 overs)

Wellington won by 3 wickets
University Oval, Dunedin
Umpires: Tony Gillies and R. G. Hooper

- Wellington won the toss and elected to field.
- Gregor Croudis (Otago) made his List A debut.

15 January 2017
Scorecard

Auckland Aces; 295 (47.1 overs)	v	Northern Districts; 134 (27 overs)
Sean Solia 152 (127); Jono Boult 3/63 (10 overs)		Daryl Mitchell 39 (35); Lockie Ferguson 6/27 (8 overs)

Auckland won by 161 runs
Eden Park No 2, Auckland
Umpires: Billy Bowden and Wayne Knights

- Northern Districts won the toss and elected to field.
- Ben Horne, Raja Sandhu, Sean Solia (Auckland); Peter Bocock, Zak Gibson and Freddy Walker (Northern Districts) all made their List A debuts.

=== Round 2 ===
18 January 2017
Scorecard

Central Stags; 212/9 (50 overs)	v	Wellington Firebirds; 214/6 (48.4 overs)
Josh Clarkson 68 (80); Anurag Verma 5/44 (10 overs)		Luke Woodcock 63* (75); George Worker 3/35 (10 overs)

Wellington won by 4 wickets
McLean Park, Napier
Umpires: Chris Brown and R. G. Hooper

- Central Districts won the toss and elected to bat.
- Navin Patel (Central Districts) made his List A debut.

18 January 2017
Scorecard

Canterbury; 135 (32 overs)	v	Northern Districts; 136/1 (29.3 overs)
Jack Boyle 41 (70); Brett Randell 4/34 (8 overs)		Joe Carter 64 (89); Logan van Beek 1/15 (2.3 overs)

Northern Districts won by 9 wickets
Seddon Park, Hamilton
Umpires: Tony Gillies and Ashley Mehrotra

- Canterbury won the toss and elected to bat.
- Will Williams (Canterbury) and Brett Randell (Northern Districts) both made their List A debuts.

18 January 2017
Scorecard

Auckland Aces; 257 (48.4 overs)	v	Otago Volts; 238 (46.3 overs)
Sean Solia 84 (73); Anaru Kitchen 4/23 (10 overs)		Brad Wilson 40 (43); Tarun Nethula 3/41 (10 overs)

Auckland won by 19 runs
Eden Park No 2, Auckland
Umpires: Billy Bowden and Garth Stirrat

- Auckland won the toss and elected to bat.
- Jack Hunter (Otago) made his List A debut.

=== Round 3 ===
22 January 2017
Scorecard

Northern Districts; 266/6 (50 overs)	v	Central Stags; 200/8 (32.1 overs)
Daryl Mitchell 93 (85); Seth Rance 2/53 (10 overs)		Josh Clarkson 48 (24); Scott Kuggeleijn 2/26 (7 overs)

Central Districts won by 2 wickets (D/L method)
Seddon Park, Hamilton
Umpires: Chris Brown and Phil Jones

- Northern Districts won the toss and elected to bat.
- Bharat Popli (Northern Districts) made his List A debut.

22 January 2017
Scorecard

Wellington Firebirds	v	Auckland

Match abandoned
Basin Reserve, Wellington
Umpires: Ashley Mehrotra and Tim Parlane

- No toss.
- No play was possible due to rain.

22 January 2017
Scorecard

Otago Volts	v	Canterbury

Match abandoned
University Oval, Dunedin
Umpires: Wayne Knights and Derek Walker

- No toss.
- No play was possible due to rain.

=== Round 4 ===
25 January 2017
Scorecard

Auckland Aces; 392/3 (50 overs)	v	Central Stags; 249/3 (34.4 overs)
Martin Guptill 112 (95); Blair Tickner 2/55 (10 overs)		George Worker 107* (102); Donovan Grobbelaar 2/38 (5.4 overs)

Auckland won by 4 runs (D/L method)
Eden Park No 2, Auckland
Umpires: Tony Gillies and Phil Jones

- Central Districts won the toss and elected to field.
- Liam Dudding (Central Districts) made his List A debut.

25 January 2017
Scorecard

Northern Districts; 259 (49.4 overs)	v	Otago Volts; 134 (38.3 overs)
Dean Brownlie 71 (98); Michael Rippon 3/36 (10 overs)		Derek de Boorder 43 (75); Zak Gibson 4/31 (9 overs)

Northern Districts won by 125 runs
Cobham Oval, Whangārei
Umpires: Billy Bowden and Tim Parlane

- Otago won the toss and elected to field.
- Nathan Smith (Otago) made his List A debut.

25 January 2017
Scorecard

Wellington Firebirds; 166/6 (27 overs)	v	Canterbury; 123/6 (22.2 overs)
Matt Taylor 43* (22); Tim Johnston 2/25 (5 overs)		Jack Boyle 68 (71); Hamish Bennett 3/9 (4 overs)

Wellington won by 10 runs (D/L method)
Basin Reserve, Wellington
Umpires: Wayne Knights and Garth Stirrat

- Canterbury won the toss and elected to field.
- Harry Chamberlain (Canterbury) made his List A debut.

=== Round 5 ===
28 January 2017
Scorecard

Northern Districts; 285/6 (50 overs)	v	Wellington Firebirds; 150 (34.3 overs)
Nick Kelly 118* (103); Ian McPeake 2/61 (9 overs)		Matt Taylor 45 (52); Jono Boult 3/29 (5 overs)

Northern Districts won by 135 runs
Cobham Oval, Whangārei
Umpires: Phil Jones and Tim Parlane

- Northern Districts won the toss and elected to bat.
- Henry Cooper (Northern Districts) and Ian McPeake (Wellington) both made their List A debuts.

28 January 2017
Scorecard

Otago Volts; 287 (50 overs)	v	Central Stags; 264 (49.4 overs)
Michael Bracewell 92 (98); Liam Dudding 3/67 (10 overs)		Will Young 63 (74); Jack Hunter 4/51 (9.4 overs)

Otago won by 23 runs
Fitzherbert Park, Palmerston North
Umpires: Ashley Mehrotra and Garth Stirrat

- Otago won the toss and elected to bat.

28 January 2017
Scorecard

Auckland Aces; 209/8 (50 overs)	v	Canterbury; 210/5 (38.2 overs)
Rob Nicol 67 (90); Tim Johnston 3/30 (10 overs)		Henry Nicholls 76 (92); Mark Chapman 2/33 (6 overs)

Canterbury won by 5 wickets
Mainpower Oval, Rangiora
Umpires: John Bromley and Shaun Haig

- Auckland won the toss and elected to bat.

=== Round 6 ===
1 February 2017
Scorecard

Central Stags; 150/2 (30 overs)	v	Wellington Firebirds
George Worker 80* (90); Hamish Bennett 1/15 (4 overs)

No result
Basin Reserve, Wellington
Umpires: John Bromley and Tim Parlane

- Central Districts won the toss and elected to bat.
- Rain stopped play during Central Districts' innings with no further play possible.

1 February 2017
Scorecard

Canterbury; 275/7 (50 overs)	v	Northern Districts; 273 (49.3 overs)
Henry Nicholls 140 (125); Scott Kuggeleijn 3/29 (10 overs)		Tim Seifert 104 (87); Logan van Beek 4/55 (8.3 overs)

Canterbury won by 2 runs
Hagley Oval, Christchurch
Umpires: Phil Jones and Ashley Mehrotra

- Canterbury won the toss and elected to bat.

1 February 2017
Scorecard

Otago Volts; 340/7 (50 overs)	v	Auckland Aces; 307/7 (50 overs)
Michael Rippon 83 (90); Raja Sandhu 3/79 (10 overs)		Sean Solia 64 (68); Neil Wagner 2/56 (10 overs)

Otago won by 33 runs
Queens Park, Invercargill
Umpires: John Dempsey and Derek Walker

- Auckland won the toss and elected to field.

=== Round 7 ===
4 February 2017
Scorecard

Central Stags; 401/8 (50 overs)	v	Northern Districts; 174 (35.3 overs)
George Worker 181 (143); Brett Randell 3/68 (9 overs)		Scott Kuggeleijn 65 (57); George Worker 4/36 (5.3 overs)

Central Districts won by 227 runs
Pukekura Park, New Plymouth
Umpires: Billy Bowden and Garth Stirrat

- Central Districts won the toss and elected to bat.
- Joe Walker (Northern Districts) made his List A debut.

4 February 2017
Scorecard

Canterbury; 276/7 (50 overs)	v	Auckland Aces; 251/9 (50 overs)
Henry Nicholls 65 (77); Donovan Grobbelaar 3/58 (10 overs)		Rob Nicol 76 (97); Will Williams 3/39 (8 overs)

Canterbury won by 25 runs
Eden Park No 2, Auckland
Umpires: John Dempsey and Derek Walker

- Canterbury won the toss and elected to field.
- Danru Ferns (Auckland) made his List A debut.

4 February 2017
Scorecard

Otago Volts; 153 (38.2 overs)	v	Wellington Firebirds; 157/6 (26 overs)
Gregor Croudis 41 (46); Ian McPeake 4/33 (10 overs)		Hamish Marshall 42 (32); Christi Viljoen 3/31 (8 overs)

Wellington won by 4 wickets
Basin Reserve, Wellington
Umpires: Wayne Knights and Eugene Sanders

- Otago won the toss and elected to bat.

=== Round 8 ===
8 February 2017
Scorecard

Auckland Aces; 237 (43.2 overs)	v	Central Stags; 240/3 (39.1 overs)
Colin Munro 62 (43); George Worker 4/22 (6 overs)		Will Young 106* (104); Colin Munro 2/28 (6.1 overs)

Central Districts won by 7 wickets
Pukekura Park, New Plymouth
Umpires: John Dempsey and Tim Parlane

- Auckland won the toss and elected to bat.

8 February 2017
Scorecard

Canterbury; 246/9 (50 overs)	v	Wellington Firebirds; 249/8 (48.1 overs)
Henry Nicholls 64 (84); Luke Woodcock 4/50 (10 overs)		Hamish Marshall 108 (100); Todd Astle 3/41 (10 overs)

Wellington won by 2 wickets
Hagley Oval, Christchurch
Umpires: Billy Bowden and Eugene Sanders

- Canterbury won the toss and elected to bat.

8 February 2017
Scorecard

Northern Districts; 288/6 (50 overs)	v	Otago Volts; 289/8 (34.1 overs)
Bharat Popli 69 (97); James Neesham 3/58 (10 overs)		Anaru Kitchen 143* (85); Ish Sodhi 4/85 (10 overs)

Otago won by 2 wickets
University Oval, Dunedin
Umpires: Shaun Haig and Derek Walker

- Otago won the toss and elected to field.

== Finals ==
1st Preliminary Final
11 February 2017
Scorecard

Canterbury; 250 (49.3 overs)	v	Wellington Firebirds; 223 (49.3 overs)
Chad Bowes 84 (90); Jeetan Patel 3/36 (9.3 overs)		Luke Ronchi 63 (76); Henry Shipley 3/37 (10 overs)

Canterbury won by 27 runs
Hagley Oval, Christchurch
Umpires: Billy Bowden and Phil Jones

- Wellington won the toss and elected to field.

2nd Preliminary Final
11 February 2017
Scorecard

Central Stags; 336/7 (50 overs)	v	Northern Districts; 288 (48.3 overs)
Tom Bruce 100 (81); Ish Sodhi 3/46 (10 overs)		Scott Kuggeleijn 85* (52); Ajaz Patel 3/43 (10 overs)

Central Districts won by 48 runs
Pukekura Park, New Plymouth
Umpires: Ashley Mehrotra and Derek Walker

- Central Districts won the toss and elected to bat.

3rd Preliminary Final
15 February 2017
Scorecard

Central Stags; 247 (50 overs)	v	Wellington Firebirds; 249/5 (49.3 overs)
George Worker 85 (118); Anurag Verma 4/49 (10 overs)		Michael Papps 80 (124); Blair Tickner 2/39 (9 overs)

Wellington won by 5 wickets
Basin Reserve, Wellington
Umpires: Tony Gillies and Tim Parlane

- Wellington won the toss and elected to field.

Final
18 February 2017
Scorecard

Canterbury; 199/3 (20 overs)	v	Wellington Firebirds; 171 (19.3 overs)
Peter Fulton 116* (58); Brent Arnel 1/24 (4 overs)		Hamish Marshall 59 (29); Andrew Ellis 4/28 (4 overs)

Canterbury won by 28 runs
Mainpower Oval, Rangiora
Umpires: Billy Bowden and Shaun Haig

- Wellington won the toss and elected to field.
- Rain reduced the game to 20 overs per side.
