= Noelene Swinton =

New Zealand high jumper

Noelene Horne née Swinton
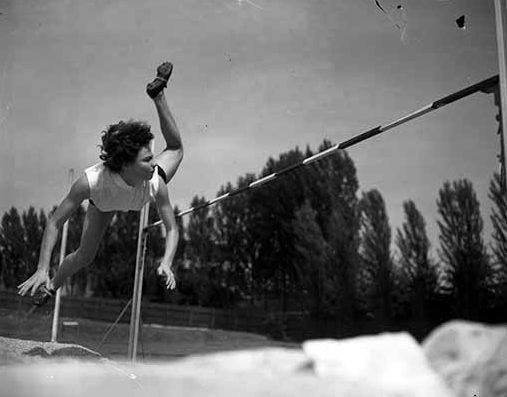
- Noelene Swinton at the 1954 British Empire and Commonwealth Games; Attribution:Province newspaper

Personal information
- Born: 1933 (age 92–93)
- Spouse: Valentine Arthur Horne (m. 1959)
- Children: 6
- Relative(s): Matt Horne (son); Phil Horne (son); Ben Horne (grandson)

Sport
- Country: New Zealand
- Sport: Track and field
- Event: High jump

Achievements and titles
- National finals: High jump champion (1950, 1953)
Medal record
Women's athletics
Representing New Zealand
Commonwealth Games
Bronze medal – third place	1950 Auckland	High jump

Noelene Rae Horne (née Swinton; born 1933) is a former New Zealand high jumper.

At the 1950 British Empire Games she won the bronze medal in the women's high jump. At the following 1954 British Empire and Commonwealth Games she placed 5th in the high jump.

In 1959, she married Valentine Arthur Horne, who served as manager of the New Zealand badminton team at the 1966 British Empire and Commonwealth Games. The couple went on to have six children, including cricketer Matt Horne, and Phil Horne, who represented New Zealand in both badminton and cricket.
