= Gregor Croudis =

New Zealand cricketer (born 1993)

Greg Croudis
Personal information
- Full name: Gregor William Croudis
- Born: 14 January 1993 (age 33); Dunedin, Otago, New Zealand
- Batting: Left-handed
- Bowling: Right-arm leg spin

Domestic team information
- Years: Team
- 2016/17: Otago
- Source: ESPNcricinfo, 30 May 2023

Gregor William Croudis (born 14 January 1993) is a New Zealand cricketer who played for Otago during the 2016–17 season. He made his List A debut for Otago on 15 January 2017 in the 2016–17 Ford Trophy. He made his first-class debut for Otago on 21 March 2017 in the 2016–17 Plunket Shield season.

Croudis played in two first-class and six List A matches during the season. He scored 74 first-class runs and 130 List A runs. He was born at Dunedin in 1993 and educated at Otago Boys' High School where he played cricket and hockey. He played age-group cricket for Otago teams from the 2009–10 season and in England for Clifton Village Cricket Club during 2016. As a club cricketer Croudis has played for Green Island Cricket Club in Dunedin. He works as a teacher.
