= Queensbridge School =

Location
- Queensbridge Road, Moseley; Birmingham, West Midlands, B13 8QB; England
- 52°26′28″N 1°53′38″W

Information
- Type: Foundation school
- Local authority: Birmingham City Council
- Department for Education URN: 103497 Tables
- Ofsted: Reports
- Chair: Jo Klaces
- Interim Headteacher: S Taylor
- Gender: Mixed
- Age: 11 to 16
- Enrolment: 860
- Colours: Navy Blue and Light Blue
- Website: http://www.queensbridge.bham.sch.uk/

Queensbridge School is a mixed, 11–16 comprehensive school in Moseley, West Midlands, England. It is judged an Good School by Ofsted as of 2023. Results in 2017 place it in top 10% schools nationally for P8 for low and high prior attainers. The school has been awarded specialist Arts College status. It shares a building with Fox Hollies School. The Interim Headteacher was S Taylor following the resignation of Harpinder Singh.

== Notable former pupils ==
- Shozair Ali, cricketer
- Anna Brewster, actress and singer
- Sonia Lannaman, athlete
- Aaron Moses-Garvey, footballer for Birmingham City
- Osman Yousefzada, artist and writer
