= Kishen Velani =

English cricketer (born 1994)

Personal information
- Full name: Kishen Shailesh Velani
- Born: 2 September 1994 (age 32); Newham, London, England
- Batting: Right-handed
- Bowling: Right-arm medium

Domestic team information
- Years: Team
- 2013–2017: Essex (squad no. 8)
- FC debut: 24 September 2013 Essex v Hampshire
- LA debut: 5 August 2014 Essex v Northamptonshire

Career statistics
Competition	FC	LA	T20
Matches	11	10	16
Runs scored	351	79	172
Batting average	23.40	13.16	12.28
100s/50s	0/1	0/0	0/0
Top score	58	27	34
Balls bowled	57	12	–
Wickets	0	1	–
Bowling average	–	14.00	–
5 wickets in innings	–	0	–
10 wickets in match	–	0	–
Best bowling	–	1/14	–
Catches/stumpings	3/–	6/–	2/–
- Source: Cricinfo, 26 January 2017

Kishen Shailesh Velani (born 2 September 1994) is an English cricketer who most recently played for Essex in first-class matches as a right-handed batsman who bowls right arm medium pace. Velani has previously played for the Wanstead and Snaresbrook cricket clubs.

In November 2013, he was dropped from the England under-19 squad due to a lack of fitness two months prior to the World Cup.

In October 2017, Velani left Essex at the end of his contract.
