= Peter Burge Oval =

Cricket ground

- Interactive map of Peter Burge Oval

Ground information
- Location: City of Redland, Queensland, Australia
- Country: Australia
- Coordinates: 27.4904°S 153.2359°E
- Establishment: 1999/00

International information
- First women's ODI: 21 August 2014: Australia v Pakistan
- Last women's ODI: 28 August 2014: Australia v Pakistan
- As of 8 September 2020; Source: Ground profile

The Peter Burge Oval is a cricket ground in Wellington Point, City of Redland, Queensland, Australia. It was named after the Australian cricketer Peter Burge. The first recorded match on the ground was in the 1999/00 season. It was used as a venue to host One Day International matches between Australia and Pakistan in the 2014–16 ICC Women's Championship.

== See also ==
- List of cricket grounds in Australia
- List of women's One Day International cricket grounds
