= Writam Porel =

Indian cricketer (born 1989)

Personal information
- Born: 29 August 1989 (age 37); Kolkata, India
- Source: Cricinfo, 4 October 2015

Writam Porel (born 29 August 1989) is an Indian first-class cricketer who plays for Bengal.
