= Shozair Ali =

English cricketer

Personal information
- Full name: Shozair Abbas Ali
- Born: 28 December 1992 (age 33); Birmingham, West Midlands, England
- Batting: Left-handed
- Bowling: Right-arm fast-medium

Domestic team information
- Years: Team
- 2013: Warwickshire

Career statistics
Competition	First-class
Matches	1
Runs scored	10
Batting average	5.00
100s/50s	0/0
Top score	8
Balls bowled	174
Wickets	2
Bowling average	51.50
5 wickets in innings	0
10 wickets in match	0
Best bowling	2/76
Catches/stumpings	0/–
- Source: Cricinfo, 25 May 2013

Shozair Abbas Ali (born 28 December 1992) is an English first-class cricketer. Ali is a left-handed batsman who bowls right-arm fast-medium. He was born in Birmingham, West Midlands.

Educated at Queensbridge School and Moseley Sixth Form College, Ali played cricket from the age of fourteen. He was quickly scouted from Warwickshire district trials, and has represented Warwickshire since under-15 level age-group. In January 2012, he toured Bangladesh with the England Under-19s, making his Youth One Day International (YODI) debut against Bangladesh Under-19s, with him making three further YODI appearances during the tour. He was selected later in the year in England's fifteen man squad for the Under-19 Cricket World Cup in Australia. Prior to the tournament, England played a warm up quadrangular series against Australia, India and New Zealand Under-19s, with Ali playing in three matches. In the World Cup that followed, he made two appearances against Nepal and Bangladesh Under-19s.

Having played Second XI cricket since 2010, Ali made his full debut for Warwickshire in their first first-class match of the 2013 season against Oxford MCCU at the University Parks, scoring 10 runs in the match and taking the wickets of Tom Fell and Charlie Ellison.
