= Zafrul Ehsan =

Bangladeshi cricket coach (1963/1964 – 2024)

Zafrul Ehsan (Bengali: জাফরুল এহসান; 1963/1964 – 18 June 2024) was a Bangladeshi Level III cricket coach.

Ehsan coached the Bangladesh women's national cricket team in 2008. He coached the Bangladesh national under-19 cricket team in 2012, and continued with the U-19 team in 2013 as assistant coach.

In 2015, when Paul Terry reconstituted the Bangladesh Cricket Board's High Performance unit, Ehsan became its batting coach, initially under head coach Mal Loye, a former English batsman.

He was made head coach of the Sylhet Sixers in the Bangladesh Premier League in 2017. For the 2018–19 season he was appointed coach of Walton Central Zone. In October 2019, Ehsan replaced Masud Parvez as coach of the Rangpur Division cricket team of the National Cricket League.

Ehsan died of acute myeloid leukemia on 18 June 2024, at the age of 60.
