= Ryan Hunter (cricketer) =

Irish cricketer (born 1992)

Personal information
- Born: 19 November 1992 (age 33)
- Source: Cricinfo, 1 September 2020

Ryan Hunter (born 19 November 1992) is an Irish cricketer. He made his Twenty20 debut for North West Warriors in the 2020 Inter-Provincial Trophy on 1 September 2020. Prior to his Twenty20 debut, he was part of Ireland's squad for the 2012 Under-19 Cricket World Cup.
