= Sandipan Das =

Indian cricketer (born 1992)

Personal information
- Full name: Sandipan Swapan Das
- Born: 29 November 1992 (age 33); Kolkata, West Bengal, India
- Height: 5 ft 7 in (1.70 m)
- Batting: Right-handed
- Bowling: Right arm Medium
- Role: Batting All rounder

Domestic team information
- Years: Team
- 2012–present: Bengal
- 2012: India U-19

Career statistics
Competition	FC	List A
Matches	1	4
Runs scored	72	76
Batting average	36.00	19.00
100s/50s	0/1	0/1
Top score	62	57
Balls bowled	78	72
Wickets	2	5
Bowling average	18.00	11.40
5 wickets in innings	0	1
10 wickets in match	0	0
Best bowling	2/36	5/51
Catches/stumpings	2/–	0/–
- Source: Cricinfo, 6 March 2013

Sandipan Das (born 29 November 1992 is an Indian First-class and List A cricketer who played for Bengal. He played for them in the 2012–13 Ranji Trophy and 2013 Vijay Hazare Trophy. He was a part of the 2012 World Cup winning squad of the India Under-19 cricket team. However, he failed to get a chance in the first XI there. Earlier, he had also played for the Cricket Association of Bengal XI.

== See also ==
- India U-19
- Bengal cricket team
