= Ben Wylie =

Irish cricketer

Personal information
- Full name: Ben Alexander Wylie
- Born: 24 April 1994 (age 32); Belfast, Northern Ireland
- Batting: Left-handed
- Bowling: Left-arm orthodox

Domestic team information
- Years: Team
- 2013: Northern Knights
- 2013–2015: Cambridge University

Career statistics
Competition	First-class
Matches	6
Runs scored	78
Batting average	11.14
100s/50s	0/0
Top score	29*
Balls bowled	600
Wickets	7
Bowling average	54.71
5 wickets in innings	0
10 wickets in match	0
Best bowling	3/14
Catches/stumpings	5/–
- Source: CricketArchive, 28 May 2015

Ben Alexander Wylie (born 24 April 1994) is a cricketer from Northern Ireland who has played at first-class level for Cambridge University. He debuted for them during the 2013 English season, having earlier played for the Ireland national under-19 side.

Born in Belfast, Wylie played under-13, under-15, and under-17 matches for Irish representative sides, and was playing senior club cricket for Instonians at an early age. A left-arm orthodox spinner, he was selected in Ireland's squad for the 2012 Under-19 World Cup, and played a single match, taking 2/24 from five overs in Ireland's loss to Scotland in the 11th-place playoff. A student of St. Catharine's College, Cambridge, Wylie regularly played for Cambridge University during the 2013 season, and made his first-class debut in April 2013, in a three-day match against Middlesex. He scored 29 not out batting seventh in the game's second innings, which is his highest first-class score to date. Wylie played in The University Match against Oxford University in both 2013 and 2014. Oxford captain Sam Agarwal scored 313 not out from 312 balls in the 2013 fixture, the first triple-century in any Cambridge–Oxford match, with Wylie finishing with figures of 1/111 from 23 overs.

== See also ==
- List of Cambridge University Cricket Club players
