= Sourav Sarkar =

Indian cricketer (born 1984)

Personal information
- Full name: Sourav Subrata Sarkar
- Born: 15 December 1984 (age 41); Calcutta, Bengal, India
- Batting: Right-handed
- Bowling: Right-arm medium-fast
- Role: Bowler

Domestic team information
- Years: Team
- 2006/07–present: Bengal
- 2009: Kolkata Knight Riders

Career statistics
Competition	FC	LA	T20
Matches	29	11	5
Runs scored	298	22	–
Batting average	10.64	6.14	–
100s/50s	0/1	0/0	–
Top score	60	7	–
Balls bowled	5413	474	79
Wickets	103	8	2
Bowling average	26.22	43.50	63.50
5 wickets in innings	2	0	0
10 wickets in match	0	0	0
Best bowling	5/21	2/24	1/15
Catches/stumpings	2/–	2/–	0/–
- Source: ESPNcricinfo, 26 December 2013

Sourav Subrata Sarkar (born 15 December 1984) is an Indian first-class cricketer who plays for Bengal in domestic cricket. He is a right-arm medium-fast bowler. He played for Kolkata Knight Riders in 2009.
