= Maham Tariq =

Pakistani cricketer (born 1997)

Personal information
- Full name: Maham Tariq
- Born: 5 July 1997 (age 29); Karachi, Pakistan
- Batting: Right-handed
- Bowling: Right-arm fast-medium
- Role: Bowler

International information
- National side: Pakistan (2014–2017)
- ODI debut (cap 68): 21 August 2014 v Australia
- Last ODI: 19 February 2017 v India
- T20I debut (cap 32): 3 September 2014 v Australia
- Last T20I: 3 July 2016 v England

Domestic team information
- Years: Team
- 2012/13–2014: Karachi
- 2014: Omar Associates
- 2015/16–2016/17: Zarai Taraqiati Bank Limited
- 2017: Karachi
- 2018–2018/19: State Bank of Pakistan

Career statistics
| Competition | WODI | WT20I | WLA | WT20 |
|---|---|---|---|---|
| Matches | 8 | 3 | 49 | 28 |
| Runs scored | 9 | – | 129 | 19 |
| Batting average | 1.80 | – | 6.45 | 9.50 |
| 100s/50s | 0/0 | – | 0/0 | 0/0 |
| Top score | 3* | – | 24 | 7* |
| Balls bowled | 246 | 48 | 1,866 | 510 |
| Wickets | 5 | 1 | 48 | 20 |
| Bowling average | 55.40 | 75.00 | 27.91 | 28.45 |
| 5 wickets in innings | 0 | 0 | 0 | 0 |
| 10 wickets in match | 0 | 0 | 0 | 0 |
| Best bowling | 2/63 | 1/11 | 4/14 | 2/22 |
| Catches/stumpings | 1/– | 0/– | 11/– | 4/– |
- Source: CricketArchive, 6 January 2022

Maham Tariq Magsi (born 5 July 1997) is a Pakistani cricketer who plays as a right-arm fast-medium bowler. She appeared in eight One Day Internationals and three Twenty20 Internationals for Pakistan between 2014 and 2017. She has also played domestic cricket for Karachi, Omar Associates, Zarai Taraqiati Bank Limited and State Bank of Pakistan.

After last playing for the Pakistan team in February 2017, she was named in Pakistan's squad for their series against the West Indies in June 2021. In October 2021, she was named in Pakistan's team for the 2021 Women's Cricket World Cup Qualifier tournament in Zimbabwe.
