= Matt Horne =

New Zealand cricketer

Personal information
- Full name: Matthew Jeffery Horne
- Born: 5 December 1970 (age 55); Takapuna, Auckland, New Zealand
- Batting: Right-handed
- Bowling: Right-arm medium
- Relatives: Noelene Swinton (mother); Phil Horne (brother); Ben Horne (nephew)

International information
- National side: New Zealand (1997–2003)
- Test debut (cap 201): 14 February 1997 v England
- Last Test: 3 May 2003 v Sri Lanka
- ODI debut (cap 99): 25 March 1997 v Sri Lanka
- Last ODI: 27 April 2002 v Pakistan

Domestic team information
- Years: Team
- 1992/93–1995/96: Auckland
- 1996/97–2000/01: Otago
- 2001/02–2005/06: Auckland

Career statistics
Competition	Test	ODI	FC	LA
Matches	35	50	128	138
Runs scored	1,788	980	8,501	3,193
Batting average	28.38	20.41	40.87	23.82
100s/50s	4/5	0/5	24/33	2/18
Top score	157	74	241	114
Balls bowled	66	0	1,177	884
Wickets	0	–	7	18
Bowling average	–	–	75.85	37.66
5 wickets in innings	–	–	0	0
10 wickets in match	–	–	0	0
Best bowling	–	–	2/58	3/17
Catches/stumpings	17/–	12/–	79/–	34/–
Medal record
Representing New Zealand
Men's Cricket
Commonwealth Games
Bronze medal – third place	1998 Kuala Lumpur	List-A cricket
- Source: Cricinfo, 4 May 2017

Matthew Jeffery Horne (born 5 December 1970) is a former New Zealand cricketer who played in 35 Test matches and 50 One Day Internationals from 1997 to 2003. Horne was an attacking right-handed opening batsman who possessed an unusually high backlift.

== Early life and family ==
Horne was born in Takapuna on 5 December 1970, the son of Noelene Rae Horne (née Swinton), who represented New Zealand in the high jump, and Valentine Arthur Horne. His older brother Phil also played international cricket for New Zealand.

== Domestic career ==
In the 1995–96 Shell Trophy final he made 190 to hand Auckland the championship. The following season he moved to Otago and after a prolific season he was welcomed into the New Zealand team.

During the 2003–04 he and Aaron Barnes added a record 347* for the fifth wicket against Northern Districts at Eden Park.

== International career ==
He made his Test debut in February 1997 and made his maiden Test hundred soon after, against Australia at Hobart in summer of 1997–98. He made 3 more hundreds in his international career, two against Zimbabwe and a vital one at Lord's in 1999 to help give them a rare away series win. After nine Tests without a half century he lost his place in the team and only played occasionally from there on in.

Horne, along with Nathan Astle, currently holds the record for a 4th wicket partnership for New Zealand totalling 243 runs against Zimbabwe in Auckland during the 1997–1998 season.

== After cricket ==
He retired from all forms of competitive cricket in May 2006. He is currently a high performance coach with Auckland cricket.
