= Will Bosisto =

Australian cricketer

Personal information
- Full name: William Giles Bosisto
- Born: 8 September 1993 (age 33); Geraldton, Western Australia, Australia
- Height: 183 cm (6 ft 0 in)
- Batting: Right-handed
- Bowling: Right-arm off break
- Role: Batsman

Domestic team information
- Years: Team
- 2012/13–2018/19: Western Australia
- 2017/18–2018/19: Perth Scorchers
- 2019/20–2020/21: South Australia
- 2024/25: Khulna Tigers

Career statistics
| Competition | FC | LA | T20 |
|---|---|---|---|
| Matches | 28 | 14 | 21 |
| Runs scored | 1,104 | 389 | 400 |
| Batting average | 22.53 | 27.78 | 33.33 |
| 100s/50s | 2/4 | 0/3 | 0/2 |
| Top score | 167* | 86 | 75* |
| Balls bowled | 1,718 | 96 | 78 |
| Wickets | 17 | 1 | 3 |
| Bowling average | 53.76 | 104.00 | 28.00 |
| 5 wickets in innings | 0 | 0 | 0 |
| 10 wickets in match | 0 | 0 | 0 |
| Best bowling | 2/28 | 1/19 | 2/10 |
| Catches/stumpings | 25/– | 5/– | 6/– |
- Source: ESPNcricinfo, 6 January 2026

William Giles Bosisto (born 8 September 1993) is an Australian cricketer. He captained Australia in the 2012 ICC Under-19 Cricket World Cup, where he was named the player of the tournament, and later played domestic cricket for Western Australia and South Australia cricket team. He also played franchise Twenty20 cricket for the Perth Scorchers in the Big Bash League in Australia and for the Khulna Tigers in the Bangladesh Premier League. He also played franchise Twenty20 cricket for the Karnali Yaks(2024,2025), Kathmandu Gorkhas(2026) in the Nepal premier League in Nepal.

== Cricket career ==
At the 2011–12 Australian Under-19 Championships, Bosisto captained Western Australia, and was subsequently selected to captain the Australian under-19 cricket team at the 2012 ICC Under-19 Cricket World Cup. Through the tournament, Bosisto batted in a slow, level-headed fashion, scoring his runs at a slow strike rate but helping to steady Australia's innings when early wickets had fallen. In Australia's quarter-final against Bangladesh, Bosisto was at the crease when teammate Jimmy Peirson was controversially dismissed by Mankading by Bangladesh bowler Soumya Sarkar. Bosisto asked for Bangladesh to withdraw their appeal, but the team did not. Bosisto responded by scoring 71 runs not out, facing 134 deliveries to reach the total, and was named the player of the match. This was his fourth consecutive innings in the tournament without being dismissed, leading Australia to four consecutive victories. Bosisto was finally dismissed for the first time in the tournament in Australia's semi-final against South Africa, when Australia were just four runs away from winning the match. Bosisto's highest score for the tournament came in the final against India, with 87 runs not out after coming in to bat when Australia had lost four early wickets, but Australia lost the match. Bosisto finished the tournament with 276 runs, and only being dismissed once achieved a batting average of 276. At the competition's conclusion, Bosisto was named the "Player of the Tournament".

Despite his success in the Under-19 World Cup, Bosisto struggled to break through in Australian domestic cricket. Ahead of the World Cup he had been granted a rookie contract with Western Australia to play in the upcoming 2012–13 season, but over the following seven seasons with the team he wasn't able to secure a permanent place in the squad. He made his List A debut for the state in the 2012–13 Ryobi One-Day Cup, replacing the injured Adam Voges, but was run out for a duck after facing just five balls. His first-class debut came the following year, in the 2013–14 Sheffield Shield season. Bosisto played for Western Australia primarily as a batsman, but also bowled part-time off-spin. However, in November 2014, Bosisto was banned from bowling in Cricket Australia competitions as he was found to have an illegal bowling action, with his elbow extending by more than the allowed 15-degrees when tested. He was still allowed to continue playing as a batsman. Bosisto worked with coach Daryl Foster to fix his action to be allowed to bowl again. In seven seasons with Western Australia, he played 49 matches across first-class and limited-overs cricket, as well as 11 Twenty20s for the Perth Scorchers in the Big Bash League.

After the 2018–19 season, Bosisto was informed that his contract with Western Australia would not be renewed. He spent the following winter in England playing club cricket in Durham. After being contacted by Tim Nielsen, the high performance manager for South Australia, Bosisto moved to Adelaide in September 2019 to seek further opportunities there. He had immediate success in South Australian Premier Cricket, scoring three centuries for Adelaide University, and was elevated to South Australia's senior team by the end of 2019, and was given a contract with the team for the 2020–21 season. In April 2021, he was one of five players to be dropped by the South Australia cricket team, following a season without any wins. This effectively ended Bosisto's career in first-class cricket. He had played 27 Sheffield Shield matches across eight years.

After being cut from South Australia's team, Bosisto continued playing cricket at lower levels in both Australia and England while also working as a mortgage broker in Perth. He made a return to top-level cricket in 2024, playing in the Nepal Premier League for the Karnali Yaks. He also played in a tournament in Melbourne alongside former Bangladeshi international cricket Imrul Kayes, who later asked if Bosisto would join him at the Khulna Tigers in the 2025 Bangladesh Premier League, which he agreed to. Bosisto had a successful season with the Tigers, finally scoring his maiden Twenty20 half-century with 75 runs not out against the Chittagong Kings.
