= Shehan Fernando =

Sri Lankan cricketer (born 1993)

Shehan Ian Fernando
Personal information
- Full name: Shehan Ian Fernando
- Born: 14 April 1993 (age 33); Dambadeniya, Sri Lanka
- Batting: Right-handed
- Bowling: Right-arm offbreak
- Role: Allrounder
- Source: ESPNcricinfo, 3 December 2016

Shehan Fernando (born 14 April 1993) is a Sri Lankan cricketer. He made his first-class debut for Colts Cricket Club in the 2012–13 Premier Trophy on 8 February 2013.

In April 2018, he was named in Galle's squad for the 2018 Super Provincial One Day Tournament. In June 2021, he was selected to take part in the Minor League Cricket tournament in the United States following the players' draft.
