= Mohibullah Oryakhel =

Afghan cricketer (born 1992)

Personal information
- Full name: Mohibullah Paak Oryakhel
- Born: 12 October 1992 (age 34); Baghlan, Afghanistan
- Nickname: Mohib
- Batting: Right-handed
- Bowling: Right-arm medium fast
- Role: Batsman

International information
- National side: Afghanistan
- ODI debut (cap 28): 6 March 2013 v Scotland
- Last ODI: 8 March 2013 v Scotland

Career statistics
Competition	ODI
Matches	2
Runs scored	–
Batting average
100s/50s	/
Top score
Balls bowled	–
Wickets	–
Bowling average	–
5 wickets in innings	–
10 wickets in match	–
Best bowling	–
Catches/stumpings	02/–
- Source: ESPN Cricinfo, 23 July 2016

Mohibullah Oryakhel is an Afghan cricketer, who has played for the national cricket team. He is a right-handed batsman and right-arm medium fast bowler. He represented Afghanistan in the 2012 ICC Under-19 Cricket World Cup.

He made his One Day International debut against Scotland on 6 March 2013.
