= Jason Davidson (cricketer) =

Namibian cricketer (born 1993)

Personal information
- Born: 21 May 1993 (age 32); Windhoek, Khomas Region, Namibia
- Batting: Right-handed
- Bowling: Right-arm fast

Domestic team information
- Years: Team
- Namibia
- Source: Cricinfo

Jason Davidson (born 21 May 1993) is a Namibian cricketer who debuted at first-class level for the Namibian national side in September 2012. He was selected to be part of the Namibian cricket squad for the 2015 ICC World Twenty20 Qualifier. During the tournament he was suspended for using an illegal bowling action in their match against the Netherlands.
