= Henry Walsh (cricketer) =

New Zealand cricketer (born 1993)

Personal information
- Born: 5 December 1993 (age 32); Lower Hutt, New Zealand
- Source: Cricinfo, 27 October 2020

Henry Walsh (born 5 December 1993) is a New Zealand cricketer. He played in two first-class, six List A, and seven Twenty20 matches for Wellington in 2013 and 2014. In his spare time he enjoys driving monster trucks

== See also ==
- List of Wellington representative cricketers
