= Sam Wood (cricketer, born 1993) =

English cricketer

Personal information
- Full name: Samuel Kenneth William Wood
- Born: 3 April 1993 (age 33); Nottingham, Nottinghamshire, England
- Batting: Left-handed
- Bowling: Right-arm off break

Domestic team information
- Years: Team
- 2011–2016: Nottinghamshire (squad no. 23)
- FC debut: 20 June 2011 Nottinghamshire v Lancashire
- LA debut: 1 May 2011 Nottinghamshire v Essex

Career statistics
Competition	FC	LA	T20
Matches	3	13	24
Runs scored	77	64	94
Batting average	25.66	9.14	11.75
100s/50s	0/0	0/0	0/0
Top score	45	32	17
Balls bowled	192	222	119
Wickets	3	6	5
Bowling average	30.66	35.16	36.20
5 wickets in innings	0	0	0
10 wickets in match	0	0	0
Best bowling	3/64	2/24	2/21
Catches/stumpings	0/–	6/–	5/–
- Source: ESPNcricinfo, 15 July 2016

Samuel Kenneth William Wood (born 3 April 1993) is an English cricketer. Wood is a left-handed batsman who bowls right-arm off break. He was born in Nottingham, Nottinghamshire and educated at the Colonel Frank Seely School in Nottingham.

== County career ==
Wood made his debut for Nottinghamshire in a List A match in the 2011 Clydesdale Bank 40 against Essex. He made three further List A appearances during the 2011 season, two in the Clydesdale Bank 40 against the Unicorns and Lancashire, and another against Sri Lanka A. He took a total of 3 wickets in these matches, which came at an average of 24.00, with best figures of 2/24, though he struggled with the bat, scoring just 8 runs in three innings. He made a single first-class appearance in the 2011 County Championship against Lancashire at Trent Bridge. He wasn't a part of the starting eleven in this game, but substituted from day 3 onwards for Samit Patel who had joined up with the England team for their series against Sri Lanka.

== International career ==
Wood made his debut for England Under-19s in January 2011, playing two Youth Test matches against Sri Lanka Under-19s during England's tour to Sri Lanka. It was during this tour that he made his Youth One Day International debut, to date he has had made eleven appearances in that format, most recently in July 2011 when he played seven Youth One Day Internationals against South Africa Under-19s.
