= Ben Horne (cricketer) =

New Zealand cricketer (born 1994)

Personal information
- Full name: Benjamin James Horne
- Born: 4 March 1994 (age 32); Auckland, New Zealand
- Relatives: Phil Horne (father); Matt Horne (uncle); Noelene Swinton (grandmother)
- Source: ESPNcricinfo, 11 December 2016

Benjamin James Horne (born 4 March 1994) is a New Zealand cricketer. He made his Twenty20 debut for Auckland on 11 December 2016 in the 2016–17 Super Smash. He made his List A debut for Auckland on 15 January 2017 in the 2016–17 Ford Trophy. He made his first-class debut for Auckland on 25 February 2017 in the 2016–17 Plunket Shield season. In June 2018, he was awarded a contract with Auckland for the 2018–19 season. In September 2018, he was named in the Auckland Aces' squad for the 2018 Abu Dhabi T20 Trophy.

In June 2020, he was offered a contract by Auckland ahead of the 2020–21 domestic cricket season.
