= Christopher Coombe =

Namibian cricketer (born 1993)

Personal information
- Full name: Christopher Wayne Coombe
- Born: 13 July 1993 (age 33); Walvis Bay, Namibia
- Batting: Right-handed
- Bowling: Right-arm medium-fast
- Role: All-rounder

International information
- National side: Namibia

Career statistics
Competition	FC	LA	T20
Matches	24	18	19
Runs scored	438	102	61
Batting average	12.88	8.50	8.71
100s/50s	-/-	-/-	-/-
Top score	44	33	15
Balls bowled	2,066	526	270
Wickets	827	14	15
Bowling average	49.77	37.21	27.21
5 wickets in innings	1	-	-
10 wickets in match	-	-	-
Best bowling	5/71	4/37	3/35
Catches/stumpings	12/–	2/–	7/–
- Source: Cricinfo, 12 October 2019

Christopher Coombe (born 13 July 1993) is a Namibian cricketer who now coaches in New Zealand.

Coombe was selected as part of Namibia's squad for the 2015 ICC World Twenty20 Qualifier tournament. In August 2018, he was named in Namibia's squad for the 2018 Africa T20 Cup. In October 2018, he was named in Namibia's squad in the Southern sub region group for the 2018–19 ICC World Twenty20 Africa Qualifier tournament in Botswana.

Coombe began playing cricket in New Zealand in 2019. In 2022 he was appointed as Taranaki's first Director of Cricket, with overall responsibility for coaching in the Taranaki region as well as being the head coach for the Taranaki team. Under Chris’ leadership, Taranaki won the Hawke Cup off Hawke's Bay cricket team in 2025 and defended the tital through its remaining challenges finishing the 2025 season unbeaten.

In 2026, Coombe was appointed as Head of High Performance at Samoa Cricket and head coach of the Samoa national cricket team. He led Samoa at the 2026 Men's T20 World Cup East Asia-Pacific Sub-regional Qualifier tournament in Japan, where the team finished in third place.
