= Sanitha de Mel =

Sri Lankan cricketer (born 1992)

Personal information
- Born: 15 November 1992 (age 33); Sri Jayawardenepura Kotte, Sri Lanka
- Source: Cricinfo, 18 March 2017

Sanitha de Mel (born 15 November 1992) is a Sri Lankan cricketer. He made his first-class debut for Colts Cricket Club in the 2010–11 Premier Trophy on 29 April 2011.
