= Kamal Passi =

Indian cricketer (born 1992)

Personal information
- Full name: Kamal Passi
- Born: 30 November 1992 (age 33); Amritsar, Punjab, India
- Batting: Right handed
- Bowling: Right-arm medium

International information
- National side: India
- Source: ESPNcricinfo, 6 December 2022

Kamal Passi is an Indian cricketer. He performed exceptionally well against Zimbabwe in the 2012 under-19 Cricket World Cup. He made his first class debut for Services on 7 November 2015 in the 2015–16 Ranji Trophy.

On 14 August 2012 Kamal Passi took 6 wickets for 23 runs and made 24 runs off just five balls with a four and three sixes against Zimbabwe in a group stage match.
