= Ravikant Singh =

Indian cricketer (born 1994)

Personal information
- Born: 18 March 1994 (age 32); Kolkata, West Bengal, India
- Source: Cricinfo, 6 April 2016

Ravikant Singh (born 18 March 1994) is an Indian cricketer. He made his List A debut for Bengal in 2012. He made his Twenty20 debut on 18 November 2019, for Bengal in the 2019–20 Syed Mushtaq Ali Trophy. He did his Schooling from Rishra Vidyapith and College from City College. Singh is a medium-pacer who played in the Indian under-19s world cup squad.

== See also ==
- List of Bengal cricketers
