= 1988 Youth Cricket World Cup =

Cricket tournament

- Dates: 28 February – 13 March 1988
- Administrator: ICC
- Cricket format: Limited-overs (50 overs)
- Tournament format: Round-robin
- Host: Australia
- Champions: Australia (1st title)
- Runners-up: Pakistan
- Participants: 8
- Matches: 31
- Most runs: (Australia) Brett Williams (471)
- Most wickets: (Australia) Wayne Holdsworth (Pakistan) Mushtaq Ahmed (19 each)

The 1988 McDonald's Bicentennial Youth Cricket World Cup was an international cricket tournament played in Australia from 28 February to 13 March 1988. Sponsored by McDonald's, it was the inaugural edition of what is now the Under-19 Cricket World Cup, and formed part of the celebrations for the Australian Bicentenary.

The tournament was primarily organised by the Australian Cricket Board (ACB), with only limited oversight from the International Cricket Conference (ICC). Eight teams participated, with the seven Test-playing ICC members joined by a composite team of players from ICC associate members. (Note: South Africa, though a full member of the ICC, was subject to a sporting boycott at the time of the tournament, and consequently did not participate. The ICC Associate XI was made of players from six countries – Bangladesh, Bermuda, Canada, Denmark, the Netherlands, and Zimbabwe.) Australia defeated Pakistan in the final by five wickets, with England and the West Indies being the losing semi-finalists. The tournament play-offs were held at Adelaide Oval, with the other matches held at country venues in the states of New South Wales, South Australia, and Victoria. Australia's Brett Williams was the leading run-scorer at the tournament, while his teammate Wayne Holdsworth and Pakistan's Mushtaq Ahmed were the joint leading wicket-takers.

== Squads ==
Players at the tournament had to be 18 years or younger on 1 January 1987, restricting participation to those born before 1 January 1968.

Australia	England	ICC Associates	India
Geoff Parker (c); Huntley Armstrong; Darren Berry; Tim Bower; Michael Collins; Lachlan Ferguson; Wayne Holdsworth; Stuart Law; Brian McFadyen; Alan Mullally; Darren Playle; Joe Scuderi; Adrian Tucker; Brett Williams	Mike Atherton (c); Mark Alleyne; Martin Bicknell; James Boiling; Simon Brown; Warren Hegg; Nasser Hussain; Chris Lewis; Peter Martin; Mark Ramprakash; Neil Stanley; Harvey Trump; Trevor Ward	(Zimbabwe) Trevor Penney (c); (Zimbabwe) Glen Bruk-Jackson; (Denmark) Jesper Christiansen; (Netherlands) Tim de Leede; (Zimbabwe) Ethan Dube; (Zimbabwe) Eboo Essop-Adam; (Netherlands) Maurits Houben; (Canada) Nicholas Ifill; (Bangladesh) Aminul Islam; (Canada) Niaz Kirmani; (Bermuda) Kyle Lightbourne; (Bermuda) Dean Minors; (Bangladesh) Harunur Rashid; (Denmark) Soren Sorensen	Myluahanan Senthilnathan (c); Pravin Amre; Subroto Banerjee; Ranjib Biswal; Mohan Chaturvedi; Anand Deshpande; Narendra Hirwani; Arjan Kripal Singh; Nayan Mongia; Venkatapathy Raju; Janardhanan Ramdas; Rajagopalan Shyamsunder; Sukhvinder Tinku; Kanwar Virdi
New Zealand	Pakistan	Sri Lanka	West Indies
Lee Germon (c); Andy Caddick; Chris Cairns; Greg de Joux; Peter Dobbs; Mark Douglas; Aaron Gale; Mark Hastings; Hamish Kember; Martin Kimber; Simon Peterson; Chris Pringle; Sean Roberts; Shane Thomson	Zahoor Elahi (c); Aaqib Javed; Basit Ali; Inzamam-ul-Haq; Mohammad Nawaz; Mushtaq Ahmed; Rehan Kahloon; Shahid Anwar; Shahid Nawaz; Shakeel Khan; Wasim Ali; Zulfiqar Ali; Zulfiqar Butt	Rohan Weerakkody (c); Ajith Alirajah; Rajitha Amunugama; Chaminda Fernando; Sanath Fernando; Sanath Jayasuriya; Chandika Hathurusingha; Romesh Kaluwitharana; Chaminda Mendis; Dilhan Perera; Kapugama Priyantha; Sanjeeva Ranatunga; Johanne Samarasekera; Chaminda Unantenne; Sanjeewa Weerasinghe	Brian Lara (c); Jimmy Adams; Kenneth Browne; Rajindra Dhanraj; Hermat Gangapersad; Roland Holder; Ridley Jacobs; Nehemiah Perry; Robert Samuels; Trevor Samuels; Sam Skeete; Darwin Telemaque; Dennison Thomas

== Round-robin ==
=== Points table ===
Team	Pld	W	L	T	NR	Pts	RR
Australia	7	6	1	0	0	12	4.577
West Indies	7	5	2	0	0	10	3.711
Pakistan	7	5	2	0	0	10	3.371
England	7	4	3	0	0	8	3.194
Sri Lanka	7	3	4	0	0	6	3.475
India	7	3	4	0	0	6	2.951
New Zealand	7	2	5	0	0	4	3.526
ICC Associates XI	7	0	7	0	0	0	2.969
Source: CricketArchive

- Note: run rate (adjusted to a team's full allocation of overs if all out) was used as a tiebreaker if teams finished on an equal number of points, rather than net run rate (as is now common).

=== Matches ===
28 February
Scorecard

Australia; 238/5 (50 overs)	v	West Indies; 165 (39.5 overs)

Australia won by 73 runs
Mildura City Oval, Mildura, Victoria

28 February
Scorecard

England; 172/8 (50 overs)	v	India; 173/8 (49.4 overs)

India won by 2 wickets
Renmark Oval, Renmark, South Australia

28 February
Scorecard

ICC Associates; 163 (49.2 overs)	v	Pakistan; 166/5 (35.2 overs)

Pakistan won by 5 wickets
Chaffey Park, Merbein, Victoria

28 February
Scorecard

New Zealand; 178/9 (50 overs)	v	Sri Lanka; 166 (47.4 overs)

New Zealand won by 12 runs
Berri Oval, Berri, South Australia

29 February
Scorecard

India; 132 (45.3 overs)	v	Australia; 136/3 (39.2 overs)

Australia won by 7 wickets
Berri Oval, Berri, South Australia

29 February
Scorecard

England; 205/8 (50 overs)	v	ICC Associates; 175 (48.3 overs)

England won by 30 runs
Mildura City Oval, Mildura, Victoria

29 February
Scorecard

West Indies; 236/9 (50 overs)	v	New Zealand; 202/9 (50 overs)

West Indies won by 34 runs
Wentworth Oval, Wentworth, New South Wales

29 February
Scorecard

Sri Lanka; 151 (48.3 overs)	v	Pakistan; 152/3 (39.2 overs)

Pakistan won by 7 wickets
Barmera Oval, Barmera, South Australia

2 March
Scorecard

Australia; 249 (48.4 overs)	v	Sri Lanka; 225 (47.4 overs)

Australia won by 24 runs
Chaffey Park, Merbein, Victoria

2 March
Scorecard

England; 174/7 (50 overs)	v	West Indies; 111 (43.2 overs)

England won by 63 runs
Renmark Oval, Renmark, South Australia

2 March
Scorecard

ICC Associates; 131 (41.2 overs)	v	New Zealand; 132/6 (37.3 overs)

New Zealand won by 4 wickets
Loxton North Oval, Loxton, South Australia

2 March
Scorecard

Pakistan; 194/7 (50 overs)	v	India; 126 (39.3 overs)

Pakistan won by 68 runs
Wentworth Oval, Wentworth, New South Wales

3 March
Scorecard

Australia; 303/8 (50 overs)	v	ICC Associates; 126 (44.2 overs)

Australia won by 177 runs
Wentworth Oval, Wentworth, New South Wales

3 March
Scorecard

England; 102 (41.1 overs)	v	Sri Lanka; 103/6 (35.5 overs)

Sri Lanka won by 4 wickets
Barmera Oval, Barmera, South Australia

3 March
Scorecard

India; 164 (46.3 overs)	v	New Zealand; 120 (45.5 overs)

India won by 44 runs
Loxton North Oval, Loxton, South Australia

3 March
Scorecard

West Indies; 121 (49 overs)	v	Pakistan; 101 (43.4 overs)

West Indies won by 20 runs
Mildura City Oval, Mildura, Victoria

6 March
Scorecard

Australia; 206/7 (50 overs)	v	England; 146 (49 overs)

Australia won by 60 runs
Renmark Oval, Renmark, South Australia

6 March
Scorecard

Sri Lanka; 231/7 (50 overs)	v	ICC Associates; 184/7 (50 overs)

Sri Lanka won by 47 runs
Mildura City Oval, Mildura, Victoria

6 March
Scorecard

West Indies; 193/6 (50 overs)	v	India; 123 (46 overs)

West Indies won by 70 runs
Chaffey Park, Merbein, Victoria

6 March
Scorecard

New Zealand; 198/7 (50 overs)	v	Pakistan; 199/3 (46 overs)

Pakistan won by 7 wickets
Loxton North Oval, Loxton, South Australia

7 March
Scorecard

Australia; 254 (49.3 overs)	v	New Zealand; 206/8 (50 overs)

Australia won by 48 runs
Wentworth Oval, Wentworth, New South Wales

7 March
Scorecard

England; 126 (46.3 overs)	v	Pakistan; 70 (24.1 overs)

England won by 56 runs
Chaffey Park, Merbein, Victoria

7 March
Scorecard

ICC Associates; 111 (45 overs)	v	India; 112/3 (29 overs)

India won by 7 wickets
Berri Oval, Berri, South Australia

7 March
Scorecard

West Indies; 201/8 (50 overs)	v	Sri Lanka; 101 (39.4 overs)

West Indies won by 100 runs
Barmera Oval, Barmera, South Australia

8 March
Scorecard

Pakistan; 199 (49.4 overs)	v	Australia; 167 (47.2 overs)

Pakistan won by 32 runs
Mildura City Oval, Mildura, Victoria

8 March
Scorecard

England; 193/6 (50 overs)	v	New Zealand; 154 (44.3 overs)

England won by 39 runs
Renmark Oval, Renmark, South Australia

8 March
Scorecard

West Indies; 272/6 (50 overs)	v	ICC Associates; 149/7 (50 overs)

West Indies won by 123 runs
Wentworth Oval, Wentworth, New South Wales

8 March
Scorecard

Sri Lanka; 190/9 (50 overs)	v	India; 140 (28.2 overs)

Sri Lanka won by 50 runs
Berri Oval, Berri, South Australia

== Finals ==
=== Semi-finals ===
10 March
Scorecard

West Indies; 203/8 (50 overs)	v	Pakistan; 204/8 (47.5 overs)
Jimmy Adams 65; Shakeel Khan 2/37 (10 overs)		Shahid Anwar 76; Jimmy Adams 2/26 (5 overs)

Pakistan won by 2 wickets
Adelaide Oval

- West Indies won the toss and elected to bat.

11 March
Scorecard

England; 194 (50 overs)	v	Australia; 196/3 (45.2 overs)
Nasser Hussain 58 (69); Wayne Holdsworth 2/47 (10 overs)		Brett Williams 57 (69); Mark Alleyne 1/30 (10 overs)

Australia won by 7 wickets
Adelaide Oval
Player of the match: Mark Alleyne (Eng)

- England won the toss and elected to bat.

=== Final ===
13 March
Scorecard

Pakistan; 201 (49.3 overs)	v	Australia; 202/5 (45.5 overs)
Inzamam-ul-Haq 37 (69); Geoff Parker 3/36 (10 overs)		Brett Williams 108 (134); Mushtaq Ahmed 2/59 (10 overs)

Australia won by 5 wickets
Adelaide Oval
Umpires: Ric Evans (Aus) and Tony Crafter (Aus)
Player of the match: Brett Williams (Aus)

- Australia won the toss and elected to bowl.
