= Steven Herzberg =

Australian cricketer

Personal information
- Full name: Steven Herzberg
- Born: 25 May 1967 (age 59); Carshalton, Surrey
- Height: 6 ft 4 in (1.93 m)
- Batting: Right-handed
- Bowling: Right-arm off-break
- Role: Bowler

Domestic team information
- Years: Team
- 1990: Worcestershire
- 1991/92–1992/93: Western Australia
- 1993/94: Tasmania
- 1995: Kent
- 1997: Somerset

Career statistics
Competition	First-class	List A
Matches	21	5
Runs scored	394	–
Batting average	21.88	–
100s/50s	0/2	–
Top score	57*	–
Balls bowled	3,568	138
Wickets	47	1
Bowling average	38.57	127.00
5 wickets in innings	0	0
10 wickets in match	0	0
Best bowling	5/33	1/37
Catches/stumpings	6/-	1/-
- Source: CricInfo, 6 June 2013

Steven Herzberg (born 25 May 1967), known as Steve Herzberg, is an English-born former Australian professional cricketer. He played professionally in both English county cricket and Australian Sheffield Shield cricket, has represented Australia at the Maccabiah Games and runs his own corporate training company.

== Early life ==
Herzberg was born at Carshalton in Surrey in 1967. He emigrated with his family to Western Australia at the age of nine.

== Cricket career ==
Herzberg played cricket primarily as a bowler, bowling right-arm off-spin. He made his senior cricket debut for Worcestershire County Cricket Club in England in the 1990 Refuge Assurance League, a List A cricket competition. He remained at the county for two seasons and played for the county Second XI regularly but did not make another appearance for the First XI.

He made his first-class cricket debut for Western Australia (WA) against New South Wales in March 1992 in the 1991/92 Sheffield Shield. He returned to England for the 1992 season, playing once for Leicestershire's Second XI, before making his second first-class appearance for WA during the 1992/93 Sheffield Shield. He only played two senior matches for WA before moving to play for Tasmania in 1993/94, making seven first-class appearances for the team.

In 1995 Herzberg returned to England to play for Kent County Cricket Club, making five first-class appearances for the First XI, before playing for Somerset in the 1997 season. On his Kent debut he took six wickets and claimed his only five-wicket innings haul, 5/33, against Leicestershire at Canterbury. At Somerset he played seven first-class matches and appeared three times in one-day matches for the county.

During his career, which has been described as "somewhat chequered", Herzberg played for five senior teams. He made 21 first-class and five List A appearances, taking 47 first-class wickets.

== Personal life ==
Herzberg is Jewish and played for the Australian cricket team at the 1989 and 1993 Maccabiah Games. He captained the team at the 1993 games at which they won the cricket gold medal. He has since been a selector for Australian teams for the games. He coached cricket in Israel in 1997 and 1998 and played in an Israeli team in 2008 against India A in a match to mark the 60th anniversary of the founding of Israel. He coached the Israeli national team at the 1997 ICC Trophy in Malaysia.

Since retiring from professional cricket he has worked as a sales representative in the chocolate industry in Australia and operates his own corporate training firm, NRG Solutions.
