= Indian cricket team in Australia in 1985–86 =

International cricket tour

- Date: 13 December 1985 – 9 February 1986
- Location: Australia
- Result: 3-match series drawn 0–0
Teams
- Australia: India
Captains
- (Australia) Allan Border: (India) Kapil Dev
Most runs
- David Boon (323): Sunil Gavaskar (356)
Most wickets
- Bruce Reid (11): Shivlal Yadav (15)

The Indian national cricket team toured Australia in the 1985–86 season. They played 3 Test matches. The Test series was drawn 0-0. Kapil Dev and Kris Srikkanth were awarded as joint players of the series.

After the Test series India also competed in a tri nation ODI tournament. with Australia and New Zealand they won 5 of their 10-round robin matches. In the best of three final with Australia they lost 2–0.

One of cricket's most respected and important figures, Steve Waugh, made his debut on the Boxing Day test at Melbourne in second test of the series.

== Tour matches ==
=== Limited overs: Australian Capital Territory vs Indians ===
27 November
Scorecard

Australian Capital Territory	v	Indians

No result
Manuka Oval, Canberra

- No toss.
- 12 players per side (11 batting, 11 fielding).

=== Four-day: South Australia vs Indians ===
29 November–2 December
Scorecard

South Australia	v	Indians
135 (60.3 overs); Peter Sleep 22 (64); Kapil Dev 4/24 (15 overs)		245 (87.2 overs); Ashok Malhotra 67 (140); Sam Parkinson 6/56 (21.2 overs)
8/438d (138 overs); Robert Zadow 120 (267); Laxman Sivaramakrishnan 3/124 (27 overs)		6/329 (89 overs); Kapil Dev 88 (117); Tim May 2/70 (18 overs)

Indians won by 4 wickets
Adelaide Oval, Adelaide
Umpires: MP O'Brien (Aus) and Max O'Connell (Aus)

- South Australia won the toss and decided to bat.
- 12 players per side (11 batting, 11 fielding).

=== Limited overs: Victoria Country vs Indians ===
4 December
Scorecard

Victoria Country; 116 (38 overs)	v	Indians; 6/175 (50 overs)
G. Salmon 21; Roger Binny 3/17 (6 overs)		Dilip Vengsarkar 64*; P. Newland 2/41 (11 overs)

Indians won by 6 wickets
Reid Oval, Warrnambool

- Victoria Country played with 12 players, Indians with 11; both with 11 batting, 11 fielding.
- Indians batted on after winning the match.

=== Four-day: Victoria vs Indians ===
6–9 December
Scorecard

Victoria	v	Indians
233 (88.1 overs); Dean Jones 83 (190); Laxman Sivaramakrishnan 3/75 (28.1 overs)		7/182 (91 overs); Mohinder Amarnath 46 (190); Merv Hughes 3/42 (26 overs)

Match drawn
Melbourne Cricket Ground, Melbourne
Umpires: DW Holt (Aus) and Len King (Aus)

- Victoria won the toss and decided to bat.
- Denis Hickey and Geoff Parker (Victoria) made their first-class debuts.
- Play was stopped before tea on the fourth day.

=== Four-day: Tasmania vs Indians ===
20–23 December
Scorecard

Tasmania	v	Indians

No result
TCA Ground, Hobart

- No toss.

== Test Series ==
=== First Test ===
13–17 December 1985
Scorecard

Australia	v	India
381 (149 overs); Greg Ritchie 128 (321); Kapil Dev 8/106 (38 overs)		520 (202 overs); Sunil Gavaskar 166* (416); Bruce Reid 4/113 (53 overs)
0/17 (8 overs); David Boon 11* (28); Ravi Shastri 0/0 (1 over)

Match drawn
Adelaide Oval, Adelaide
Umpires: Tony Crafter (Aus) and Steve Randell (Aus)
Player of the match: Kapil Dev (Ind)

- Australia won the toss and decided to bat
- Geoff Marsh, Bruce Reid and Merv Hughes (all Aus) made their Test debut.

=== Second Test ===
26–30 December 1985
Scorecard

Australia	v	India
262 (103.5 overs); Greg Matthews 100* (152); Ravi Shastri 4/87 (37 overs)		445 (148.2 overs); K Srikkanth 86 (89); Bruce Reid 4/100 (38.2 overs)
308 (123.5 overs); Allan Border 163 (358); Ravi Shastri 4/92 (47 overs)		2/59 (25 overs); K Srikkanth 38 (61); Bruce Reid 2/23 (8 overs)

Match drawn
Melbourne Cricket Ground, Melbourne
Umpires: Dick French (Aus) and Ray Isherwood (Aus)
Player of the match: Allan Border (Aus)

- India won the toss and decided to field.

=== Third Test ===
2–6 January 1986
Scorecard

India	v	Australia
4/600d (169 overs); Sunil Gavaskar 172 (400); Dave Gilbert 2/135 (37 overs)		396 (179.3 overs); David Boon 131 (311); Shivlal Yadav 5/99 (62.3 overs)
		6/119 (77 overs); Geoff Marsh 28 (84)

Match drawn
Sydney Cricket Ground, Sydney
Umpires: Peter McConnell (Aus) and Steve Randell (Aus)
Player of the match: K Srikkanth (Ind)

- India won the toss and decided to bat.
