= Israel national under-19 cricket team =

- Nickname: Cricket Bible

Personnel
- Captain: Raphael Schachat
- Coach: Herschel Gutman
- Owner: Israel Cricket Association (ICA)

History
- List A debut: v. Germany at FB Playing Fields, St Clement, Jersey; 22 July 2007

International Cricket Council
- ICC status: Associate (June 25, 1974; 52 years ago)
- ICC region: European Cricket Council (ECC)

The Israel Under-19 cricket team represents the country of Israel in U-19 international cricket. The team is controlled by Israel Cricket Association (ICA). The team have not been qualify yet in the ICC Under-19 Cricket World Cup

== History ==
The Israel national under-19 cricket team have played their debut game against Germany on 22 July 2007 at FB Playing Fields, St Clement, Jersey. Since then the team have been playing qualification round of ICC Under-19 Cricket World Cup but have not qualified yet in the main tournament.

== Current squad ==
The following players are recently called up for the 2026 Under-19 Cricket World Cup qualification.

As of 29 April 2025

| Name | Date of birth | Batting style | Bowling style |
|---|---|---|---|
| Raphael Schachat (Captain) | 18 September 2000 | Right hand bat | Right arm offbreak |
| Josh Evans | 31 August 1992 | Right hand bat | Legbreak |
| Itamar Kehimkar | 20 June 1992 | Right hand bat | Right arm medium |
| Nir Dokarker | 3 December 1991 | Left Hand bat | Right arm medium fast |
| Shifron Waskar | 28 August 1993 | Right hand bat | |
| Levi Divekar (Vice-Captain) | 9 September 1991 | Right Hand bat | Right arm medium fast |
| Levi Kamarlekar | 27 October 1994 | Right hand bat | Left arm medium fast |
| Shalom Kristi | 17 February 1993 | Left hand bat | Right arm medium fast |
| Daniel Bergman | 19 March 1995 | Right hand bat | Right arm medium |
| Michael Cohen | 5 June 1992 | Right hand bat Wicketkeeper | |
| Oriyal Sampson | 23 March 1995 | Right hand bat | |

== Records & statistics ==
International match summary

As of 9 May 2025

Playing records
| Format | M | W | L | T | D/NR | Inaugural match |
| Minor One Day Matches | 9 | 5 | 4 | 0 | 0 | 22 July 2007 |

As of 4 October 2024

Records against other national sides
Associate members
| Opponent | M | W | L | T | NR | First match | First win |
| Belgium | 2 | 2 | 0 | 0 | 0 | 26 July 2007 | 26 July 2007 |
| Denmark | 1 | 0 | 1 | 0 | 0 | 1 August 2011 | |
| France | 1 | 0 | 1 | 0 | 0 | 26 July 2007 | |
| Germany | 1 | 1 | 0 | 0 | 0 | 22 July 2007 | 22 July 2007 |
| Gibraltar | 1 | 0 | 1 | 0 | 0 | 25 July 2007 | |
| Isle of Man | 1 | 0 | 1 | 0 | 0 | 23 July 2007 | |
| Norway | 1 | 1 | 0 | 0 | 0 | 29 July 2011 | 29 July 2011 |
| Spain | 1 | 1 | 0 | 0 | 0 | 2 August 2011 | 2 August 2011 |

== Tournament summary ==
=== ICC Under-19 Cricket World Cup ===
ICC Under-19 World Cup records
| Year | Round | Position | GP | W | L | T | NR |
|---|---|---|---|---|---|---|---|
| (Australia) 1988 | Did not qualify | | | | | | |
| (South Africa) 1998 | Did not qualify | | | | | | |
| (Sri Lanka) 2000 | Did not qualify | | | | | | |
| (New Zealand) 2002 | Did not qualify | | | | | | |
| (Bangladesh) 2004 | Did not qualify | | | | | | |
| (Sri Lanka) 2006 | Did not qualify | | | | | | |
| (Malaysia) 2008 | Did not qualify | | | | | | |
| (New Zealand) 2010 | Did not qualify | | | | | | |
| (Australia) 2012 | Did not qualify | | | | | | |
| (United Arab Emirates) 2014 | Did not qualify | | | | | | |
| (Bangladesh) 2016 | Did not qualify | | | | | | |
| (New Zealand) 2018 | Did not qualify | | | | | | |
| (South Africa) 2020 | Did not qualify | | | | | | |
| (Cricket West Indies) 2022 | Did not qualify | | | | | | |
| (South Africa) 2024 | Did not qualify | | | | | | |
| (Namibia) (Zimbabwe) 2026 | To be determined | | | | | | |
| Total | 0/15 | – | 0 | 0 | 0 | 0 | 0 |

=== ICC Under-19 Cricket World Cup qualification ===
ICC Under-19 Cricket World Cup qualification records
| Year | Round | Position | GP | W | L | T | NR |
|---|---|---|---|---|---|---|---|
| (Jersey) 2018 | Did not participate | | | | | | |
| (England) 2020 | Did not participate | | | | | | |
| (Scotland) 2022 | The tournament was postponed due to COVID-19 pandemic | | | | | | |
| (Guernsey) 2024 | Did not participate | | | | | | |
| (Denmark) 2026 | Did not participate | | | | | | |
| 2028 | To be determined | | | | | | |
| Total | 0/4 | – | 0 | 0 | 0 | 0 | 0 |

=== ICC Europe Under-19 Championship ===
ICC Europe Under-19 Championship records
| Year | Round | Position | GP | W | L | T | NR |
|---|---|---|---|---|---|---|---|
| (Northern Ireland) 1999 | The full data of the tournament have been found | | | | | | |
| (England) 2000 | The full data of the tournament have been found | | | | | | |
| (Scotland) 2001 | The full data of the tournament have been found | | | | | | |
| (England) 2002 | The full data of the tournament have been found | | | | | | |
| (Netherlands) 2003 | The full data of the tournament have been found | | | | | | |
| (England) 2004 | The full data of the tournament have been found | | | | | | |
| (Scotland) 2005 | The full data of the tournament have been found | | | | | | |
| (Northern Ireland) 2006 | The full data of the tournament have been found | | | | | | |
| (Northern Ireland) 2007 | The full data of the tournament have been found | | | | | | |
| (Scotland) 2008 | The full data of the tournament have been found | | | | | | |
| (Jersey) 2009 | The full data of the tournament have been found | | | | | | |
| (Scotland) 2010 | The full data of the tournament have been found | | | | | | |
| (Jersey) 2013 | The full data of the tournament have been found | | | | | | |
| (Jersey) 2015 | Did not participate | | | | | | |
| Total | 0/14 | – | 0 | 0 | 0 | 0 | 0 |
