= Germany national under-19 cricket team =

Personnel
- Captain: Steven Richards
- Coach: Unknown
- Owner: German Cricket Federation (GCF)

History
- List A debut: v. Israel at FB Playing Fields, St Clement, Jersey; 22 July 2007

International Cricket Council
- ICC status: Affiliate (1991); Associate member (1999)
- ICC region: European Cricket Council (ECC)

The Germany Under-19 cricket team represents the country of Germany in U-19 international cricket. The team is controlled by German Cricket Federation (GCF). The team have not been qualify yet in the ICC Under-19 Cricket World Cup

== History ==
The Germany national under-19 cricket team played their debut game against Israel on 22 July 2007 at FB Playing Fields, St Clement, Jersey. Since then the team have been playing qualification round of ICC Under-19 Cricket World Cup but have not qualified yet in the main tournament.

== Current squad ==
The following players are recently called up for the 2026 Under-19 Cricket World Cup qualification.

As of 29 April 2025

Name	Date of birth	Batting style	Bowling style
Steven Richards (Captain)	18 September 2000	Right hand bat	Right arm offbreak
Leonard Philip Gerhards	5 March 1994	Right hand bat	Right arm offbreak
Ibrahim Awan	December 18, 1991	Right hand bat	
Krishna S Cholleti	3 August 1995	Right Hand bat	Right arm medium fast
Thomas Carter	23 October 1992	Right hand bat	Right arm offbreak
Mansor Mubarik (Vice-Captain)	13 November 1992	Right Hand bat	Right arm medium fast
Mohsan T Hayat	7 July 1996	Right hand bat	Legbreak
Konrad Fuchs	5 November 1992	Left hand bat	Right arm medium fast
Christian Hein	20 December 1993	Right hand bat	Right arm medium
Hannes Bagge	20 July 1993	Right hand bat Wicketkeeper	
Oliver T Filby	23 March 1995	Right hand bat	

== Records & statistics ==
International match summary

As of 9 May 2025

Playing records
Format	M	W	L	T	D/NR	Inaugural match
Minor One Day Matches	9	2	7	0	0	22 July 2007

As of 4 October 2024

Records against other national sides
Associate members
Opponent	M	W	L	T	NR	First match	First win
Gibraltar	1	0	1	0	0	1 August 2011	
France	1	1	0	0	0	26 July 2007	26 July 2007
Italy	2	1	1	0	0	25 July 2007	25 July 2007
Israel	1	0	1	0	0	22 July 2007	
Isle of Man	2	0	2	0	0	24 July 2007	
Norway	1	0	1	0	0	2 August 2011	
Spain	1	0	1	0	0	31 July 2011	

== Tournament summary ==
=== ICC Under-19 Cricket World Cup ===
ICC Under-19 World Cup records
Year	Round	Position	GP	W	L	T	NR
(Australia) 1988	Did not qualify						
(South Africa) 1998	Did not qualify						
(Sri Lanka) 2000	Did not qualify						
(New Zealand) 2002	Did not qualify						
(Bangladesh) 2004	Did not qualify						
(Sri Lanka) 2006	Did not qualify						
(Malaysia) 2008	Did not qualify						
(New Zealand) 2010	Did not qualify						
(Australia) 2012	Did not qualify						
(United Arab Emirates) 2014	Did not qualify						
(Bangladesh) 2016	Did not qualify						
(New Zealand) 2018	Did not qualify						
(South Africa) 2020	Did not qualify						
(Cricket West Indies) 2022	Did not qualify						
(South Africa) 2024	Did not qualify						
(Namibia) (Zimbabwe) 2026	To be determined						
Total	0/15	–	0	0	0	0	0

=== ICC Under-19 Cricket World Cup qualification ===
ICC Under-19 Cricket World Cup qualification records
Year	Round	Position	GP	W	L	T	NR
(Jersey) 2018	Did not participate						
(England) 2020	Did not participate						
(Scotland) 2022	The tournament was postponed due to COVID-19 pandemic						
(Guernsey) 2024	DNQ	–	4	1	3	0	0
(Denmark) 2026	Did not participate						
2028	To be determined						
Total	1/4	–	4	1	3	0	0

=== ICC Europe Under-19 Championship ===
ICC Europe Under-19 Championship records
Year	Round	Position	GP	W	L	T	NR
(Northern Ireland) 1999	The full data of the tournament have been found						
(England) 2000	The full data of the tournament have been found						
(Scotland) 2001	The full data of the tournament have been found						
(England) 2002	The full data of the tournament have been found						
(Netherlands) 2003	The full data of the tournament have been found						
(England) 2004	The full data of the tournament have been found						
(Scotland) 2005	The full data of the tournament have been found						
(Northern Ireland) 2006	The full data of the tournament have been found						
(Northern Ireland) 2007	The full data of the tournament have been found						
(Scotland) 2008	The full data of the tournament have been found						
(Jersey) 2009	The full data of the tournament have been found						
(Scotland) 2010	The full data of the tournament have been found						
(Jersey) 2013	The full data of the tournament have been found						
(Jersey) 2015	Did not participate						
Total	0/14	–	0	0	0	0	0
