= Trevor Samuels =

Jamaican cricketer (born 1967)

Personal information
- Full name: Trevor Roy Samuels
- Born: 15 December 1967 (age 58); Negril, Jamaica
- Batting: Right-handed
- Bowling: Right-arm medium-fast

Domestic team information
- Years: Team
- 1988: Jamaica (West Indies)
- Source: CricketArchive, 6 April 2016

Trevor Roy Samuels (born 15 December 1967) is a former Jamaican cricketer who represented the Jamaica national team in West Indian domestic cricket. He played as a right-arm pace bowler.

Samuels represented the West Indies at the 1988 Youth World Cup in Australia, featuring in all eight of the team's matches. He took nine wickets (with a best of 2/17 against India), which ranked him behind only Sam Skeete and Rajindra Dhanraj amongst his teammates. Later in 1988, Samuels made his first and only first-class appearance for Jamaica against Lancashire, an English county team touring as part of its pre-season preparation. Samuels was wicketless.
