= Wayne Holdsworth =

Former Australian first-class cricketer

Personal information
- Full name: Wayne John Holdsworth
- Born: 5 October 1968 (age 58); Paddington, New South Wales, Australia
- Batting: Right-handed
- Bowling: Right-arm fast
- Role: Bowler

Domestic team information
- Years: Team
- 1989-1997: New South Wales

Career statistics
Competition	First-class	List A
Matches	68	35
Runs scored	399	107
Batting average	7.82	21.40
100s/50s	0/0	0/0
Top score	34	49*
Balls bowled	11525	1656
Wickets	212	39
Bowling average	32.75	29.17
5 wickets in innings	11	1
10 wickets in match	1	-
Best bowling	7-41	5-28
Catches/stumpings	28/0	8/0
- Source: CricketArchive

Wayne John Holdsworth (born 5 October 1968 in Paddington, New South Wales) is a former Australian first-class cricketer who played for New South Wales from 1989 to 1996.

== Cricket career ==
Holdsworth was a right-arm fast bowler who took 188 wickets for New South Wales at 32.13. His best season came in 1992/93 when he took 53 first–class wickets. In this season he became the first player in the history of Sheffield Shield cricket to take seven wickets in an innings in three consecutive matches. The tally included career-best figures of 7/41, which he took in the Sheffield Shield final against Queensland, which NSW won. He was rewarded with a spot in the 1993 Ashes touring squad and although he didn't play a Test he did take a hat-trick against Derbyshire in a warm up match and played a one-day match against Ireland, and took 3 for 13 off 6 overs. He also represented Australia B on a tour of Zimbabwe in 1991/92 under Mark Taylor and for Australia at the ICC Under 19's World Cup in 1988 which Australia won. In the season 1989/90 he was chosen for the Prime Minister's XI game against Pakistan and has been selected in a Northern Territory Invitation XI, Bradman XI and Australian Masters XI teams.

The stockily-built "quick" struggled to recapture his form and a consistent place in the NSW team following his tour of England and played his final first-class match in 1996. Nicknamed "Cracker", in his début First Class game, he took a wicket with his first ever ball for New South Wales in 1989 and also another wicket and a dropped catch in his first over.

He is all time wicket record holder at Bankstown in Sydney Grade with 511 First Grade wickets at 21.23 He also was leading season wicket taker for Bankstown in the 1986/87, 1995/96, 1997/98, 1999/00 and 2000/01.

== Personal achievements ==
- 3 × Sheffield Shield winner (NSW) – 1989/90, 1992/93 and 1993/94
- 2 × Sheffield Shield runner-up (NSW) – 1990/91 and 1991/92
- 3 × Domestic One Day winner (NSW) – 1991/92, 1992/93 and 1993/94
- 1 × Domestic One Day runner-up (NSW) – 1990/91
- Australian first-class cricket season leading wicket-taker 1992/93 (53 wickets at 25.96)
- Ashes Tourist 1993 (12 matches for Australia on tour)
- Australia B Zimbabwe Tourist 1991/92 (5 matches on tour)
- Prime Minister's XI vs Pakistan (1989/90)
- ICC Youth World Cup winner 1988 (Australia)
- ICC Youth World Cup leading wicket taker (19 wickets at 12.52)
- Bradman XI (1991/92–1998/99)
- Northern Territory Invitation XI (1992/93)
- Australia Masters XI (2008/09)
- Sydney First Grade leading season wicket taker 1995/96 (69 wickets at 14.15)
- Sydney First Grade lowest season bowling average 1991/92 (30 wickets at 12.56)
- Bankstown District Cricket Club leading season wicket taker 1986/87, 1995/96, 1997/98, 1999/00 and 2000/01

== See also ==
- List of New South Wales representative cricketers
