= Weerakkody =

Weerakkody is a Sri Lankan surname and may refer to:

- Ajith Weerakkody (born 1970), Sri Lankan former cricketer
- Jayalath Weerakkody, commander of the Sri Lankan Air Force 1998–2002 and current Sri Lankan High Commissioner to Pakistan
- Kapila Wijegunawardene (born 1964), Sri Lankan former cricketer
- Rohan Weerakkody (born 1968), Sri Lankan former cricketer
