= Shahid Nawaz =

Pakistani cricketer (born 1970)

Personal information
- Born: 26 August 1970 (age 56); Lahore, Pakistan
- Source: ESPNcricinfo, 30 September 2016

Shahid Nawaz (born 26 August 1970) is a Pakistani former cricketer. He played 104 first-class matches in Pakistan between 1987 and 2000. He was also part of Pakistan's squad for the 1988 Youth Cricket World Cup, the inaugural edition of what is now the Under-19 Cricket World Cup. Pakistan were the runners-up of the tournament.
