= Hermat Gangapersad =

Trinidad and Tobago cricketer (born 1969)

Personal information
- Born: 19 June 1969 (age 57); Laslomas#2 , Trinidad
- Batting: Left-handed
- Role: Wicket-keeper

Domestic team information
- Years: Team
- 1987–1993: Trinidad and Tobago (West Indies)and West Indies Youth Cricket .
- Source: CricketArchive, 6 April 2016

Hermat Gangapersad (born 19 June 1969) is a former Trinidadian cricketer who represented the Trinidad and Tobago national team in West Indian domestic cricket. He played as a wicket-keeper.

Gangapersad represented the West Indies under-19s at the 1988 Youth World Cup in Australia. He scored only 97 runs from eight innings, but recorded 15 dismissals while keeping wicket, second only to Australia's Darren Berry overall. Gangapersad had made his first-class debut for Trinidad and Tobago almost a year before the World Cup, playing a Shell Shield match against Guyana at the age of 17. He made semi-regular appearances at that level over the following seasons, but then migrated to the United States when he played cricket throughout the NY Tri- state areas His highest first-class score (and only half-century) was an innings of 50 runs made against the Windward Islands in January 1993.
