= Dilhan =

Dilhan is both a given name and a surname. Notable people with the name include:

- Dilhan Cooray (born 1987), Sri Lankan cricketer
- Dilhan Eryurt (1926–2012), Turkish astrophysicist
- Dilhan Perera (born 1969), Sri Lankan cricketer
- Dilhan Pillay Sandrasegara (born 1963), Singaporean lawyer
- Marguerite Dilhan (1876–1956), French lawyer
