= Sanath =

Sanath is a Sinhalese masculine given name:

- Sanath Jayasuriya, Sri Lankan cricketer.
- Sanath Kaluperuma, Sri Lankan cricketer.
- Sanath Ranjan, Sri Lankan cricketer.
- Sanath de Silva, Sri Lankan cricketer.
- Sanath Fernando, Sri Lankan former cricketer.
- Sanath Kumar, Sri Lankan former cricketer.
- Sanath Nandasiri, Sri Lankan musician.
- Sanath Lamabathusooriya, Sri Lankan professor.
- Sanath Weerakoon, Sri Lankan government official.
- Sanath Nishantha, Sri Lankan politician.
- Sanath Gunathilake, Sri Lankan film actor and film director.
- Sanath Wimalasiri, Sri Lankan actor.
