= Dennison Thomas =

Grenadian cricketer (born 1968)

Personal information
- Born: 3 March 1968 (age 58); Grenada
- Batting: Right-handed
- Bowling: Right-arm fast

Domestic team information
- Years: Team
- 1994–2000: Windward Islands (West Indies)
- Source: CricketArchive, 6 April 2016

Dennison Thomas (born 3 March 1968) is a former Grenadian cricketer who represented the Windward Islands in West Indian domestic cricket. He played as a right-arm fast bowler.

Thomas represented the West Indies under-19s at the 1988 Youth World Cup in Australia, featuring in seven of his team's eight matches. He took eight wickets, including 2/18 against Pakistan, 2/22 against Sri Lanka, and 2/28 against England. However, Thomas did not make his first-class debut until over five years later, when he played a Red Stripe Cup game against Barbados. He would remain a regular for the Windward Islands throughout the rest of the 1990s, both at first-class level and in the regional limited-overs competition. In 20 first-class appearances for the Windwards, Thomas took 36 wickets, with his best figures, 4/42, coming against Jamaica in February 1996.
