= Darwin Telemaque =

Dominican cricketer (born 1968)

Personal information
- Full name: Darwin Terrel Telemaque
- Born: 1 December 1968 (age 57); Wesley, Dominica
- Batting: Right-handed
- Bowling: Right-arm medium
- Role: Opening batsman

Domestic team information
- Years: Team
- 1988–1990: Windward Islands
- Source: CricketArchive, 24 January 2016

Darwin Terrel Telemaque (born 1 December 1968) is a former Dominican cricketer who played for the Windward Islands in West Indian domestic cricket. He played as a right-handed opening batsman.

Telemaque played for the West Indies under-19s at the 1988 Youth World Cup in Australia. He had made his first-class and List A debuts for the Windwards earlier in the year. On his first-class debut, against the Leeward Islands, Telemaque made what was to be his highest score at that level, 71 runs opening the batting with Lance John. His innings was the highest of the game, and he was subsequently named man of the match. In March 1989, Telemaque scored 44 not out in the final of the 1988–89 Geddes Grant Shield, helping his team to a one-wicket win (and their first ever domestic one-day title). Opening the batting, he had retired hurt with the score at 48/3, and returned at 85/6, eventually putting on 56 runs for the last two wickets with Ian Allen and Dominique Lewis. Telemaque left cricket at the end of the 1989–90 season, aged 21, to concentrate on his university studies, and eventually started his own transportation firm.
