= Wasim Ali =

Wasim Ali can refer to:

- Wasim Ali (Omani cricketer) (born 1998), Omani cricketer
- Wasim Ali (Pakistani cricketer) (born 1969), Pakistani cricketer
