= Shakeel Khan =

Shakeel Khan may refer to:

- Shakeel Khan (cricketer), (born 1968), Pakistani cricketer
- Shakeel Khan (umpire) (born 1952), Pakistani cricketer and umpire
- Shakeel Ahmad Khan (born 1965), Indian politician
- Shakeel Bashir Khan, Pakistani politician
- Shakeel Hussain Khan (born 1977), Pakistani actor
