= Huntley Armstrong =

Australian cricketer (born 1969)

Personal information
- Full name: Glenarvon Huntley Armstrong
- Born: 17 November 1969 (age 56); Hobart, Tasmania, Australia
- Batting: Right-handed
- Bowling: Right-arm off-spin
- Role: Middle-order batsman

Domestic team information
- Years: Team
- 1990/91–1992/93: South Australia

Career statistics
Competition	First-class	List A
Matches	3	2
Runs scored	21	23
Batting average	4.20	11.50
100s/50s	0/0	0/0
Top score	6	21
Catches/stumpings	1/–	0/–
- Source: CricketArchive, 6 April 2016

Glenarvon Huntley Armstrong (born 17 November 1969) is a former Australian cricketer who represented South Australia in Australian domestic cricket. He played as a right-handed middle-order batsman.

Armstrong was born in Hobart, Tasmania, but began his senior cricket career in Canberra (playing for the ACT cricket team), and eventually ended up in South Australia. At the 1988 Youth World Cup, he represented the Australian under-19s in all nine of their matches, including the final. Armstrong made his first-class debut for South Australia in January 1991, in a Sheffield Shield game against Victoria at the Junction Oval. Over the following two seasons, he made an additional four appearances, playing two Sheffield Shield fixtures against Western Australia and Mercantile Mutual Cup matches against Western Australia and Tasmania.
