= Sukhvinder Tinku =

Indian cricketer (born 1969)

Personal information
- Born: 4 March 1969 (age 57); Chandigarh, India
- Source: ESPNcricinfo, 30 September 2016

Sukhvinder Tinku (born 4 March 1969) is an Indian former cricketer. He played one first-class match for Punjab in 1988/89. He was also part of India's squad for the 1988 Youth Cricket World Cup.
