= Geoff Parker (cricketer) =

Australian rules footballer and cricketer

Personal information
- Full name: Geoffrey Ross Parker
- Born: 31 March 1968 (age 58); Malvern, Victoria
- Batting: Right-handed
- Bowling: Right-arm medium
- Relatives: Wil Parker (nephew)

Domestic team information
- Years: Team
- 1985/86–1991/92: Victoria
- 1996/97–1998/99: South Australia

Career statistics
Competition	First-class	List A
Matches	37	28
Runs scored	1,616	502
Batting average	26.93	22.81
100s/50s	2/9	0/1
Top score	117	83
Balls bowled	453	338
Wickets	6	3
Bowling average	40.00	90.00
5 wickets in innings	0	0
10 wickets in match	0	0
Best bowling	2/30	1/4
Catches/stumpings	29/–	3/–
- Source: CricketArchive, 31 December 2014

Geoffrey Ross Parker (born 31 March 1968) is an Australian former leading cricketer and Australian rules footballer, representing Victoria and South Australia in cricket and Essendon in the Victorian Football League (VFL).

== Cricket career ==
Born in Melbourne, Parker captained the Under-19 Australian team in the 1980s, including their victorious 1988 Youth World Cup. He played 11 Youth Tests and 19 Youth One Day Internationals.

Parker made his first-class cricket debut for Victoria in 1985 against the touring Indians – he scored two and took the wicket of Roger Binny.

In 1990 Parker played three Lancashire League games for Church Cricket Club; he scored one century and took eleven wickets. He left Victoria at the end of the 1991/92 season but after nearly 5 years out of cricket he returned with South Australia for the 1996/97 season, he scored his maiden first-class century against his old team in his fourth game back. He scored his highest score and only other century in 1999 against Western Australia, he retired at the end of that season.

Parker played in 37 first-class games scoring 1,616 runs at an average of 26.93. He scored 2 centuries with a highest score of 117. He also took 6 wickets at an average of 40, his best bowling performance being 2/30. Parker also played 28 List A games scoring 502 runs at an average of 22.81, his highest score was 83. He also took 3 List A wickets at an average of 90, his best bowling being 1/4.

== Australian rules football career ==
Parker was a leading junior footballer, representing Victoria in the national u/16s schoolboys championship in 1983, winning the J.L. Williams Medal for Best & Fairest and named in the All-Australian Schoolboy side. Parker played three games for Essendon during the late 1980s.

He is currently the head recruiting manager for AFL club Port Adelaide. His nephew, Wil Parker also played cricket for Victoria before joining Collingwood to play AFL.
