= Hamish Kember =

New Zealand cricketer (born 1968)

Personal information
- Born: 29 February 1968 (age 58); Canterbury, New Zealand
- Source: ESPNcricinfo, 30 September 2016

Hamish Kember (born 29 February 1968) is a New Zealand former cricketer. He played eight first-class matches for Canterbury between 1990 and 1995. He was also part of New Zealand's squad for the 1988 Youth Cricket World Cup.
