= Ajith Alirajah =

Sri Lankan cricketer (born 1968)

Personal information
- Full name: Ajith Christopher Alirajah
- Born: 25 September 1968 (age 58); Colombo, Sri Lanka
- Batting: Right-handed
- Bowling: Right-arm-medium
- Role: Wicket-keeper

Domestic team information
- Years: Team
- 1988-1990: Nondescripts Cricket Club

Career statistics
Competition	FC	LA
Matches	13	1
Runs scored	307	1
Batting average	19.18	1.00
100s/50s	0/1	0/0
Top score	62	1
Balls bowled	0	0
Wickets	0	0
Bowling average	0	0
5 wickets in innings	0	0
10 wickets in match	0	n/a
Best bowling	-	-
Catches/stumpings	6/0	0/0
- Source: ESPNcricinfo, 21 August 2022

Ajith Christopher Alirajah (born 25 September 1968) is a Sri Lankan former cricketer. He played thirteen first-class matches for Nondescripts Cricket Club between 1988 and 1991. He was also part of Sri Lanka's squad for the 1988 Youth Cricket World Cup. He pursued his primary and secondary education at Saint Joseph's College, Colombo. He also played school cricket for St. Joseph's College.

He later pursued his career in banking. He began his banking career at Standard Chartered and then worked as an Assistant General Manager in Trade Finance Services Department at Cargills Bank before becoming the Departmental Head of Trade Finance Services Department at Cargills Bank.
