= Anand Deshpande =

Indian cricketer

Personal information
- Full name: Anand Prakash Deshpande
- Born: 30 January 1970 (age 56); Pune, Maharashtra, India
- Batting: Left-handed
- Role: Opening batsman

Domestic team information
- Years: Team
- 1989–1990: Maharashtra
- Source: ESPNcricinfo, 2 January 2016

Anand Prakash Deshpande (born 30 January 1970) is a former Indian cricketer who played for Maharashtra in Indian domestic cricket. He played as a left-handed opening batsman.

Deshpande toured New Zealand and Pakistan with the India under-19s (in 1988 and 1989, respectively), and also represented the team at the 1988 Youth World Cup in Australia. At the World Cup, he played in three of his team's seven matches, scoring 35 runs with a best of 22 against Pakistan. Deshpande made his first-class debut for Maharashtra in November 1989, aged 19, in a Ranji Trophy match against Saurashtra. In four matches in his debut season, he scored 396 runs, including 123 against Gujarat, 89 against Baroda, and 83 against Bombay. This made him his team's leading run-scorer. Despite his earlier form, Deshpande scored only 97 runs from matches the following season, and never played again at first-class level.
