= Sam Skeete =

Barbadian cricketer

Dababy
Personal information
- Full name: Samuel McDonald Skeete
- Born: 19 January 1967 (age 59); Saint Michael Parish, Barbados
- Batting: Right-handed
- Bowling: Right-arm fast
- Role: Bowler

Domestic team information
- Years: Team
- 1990–1994: Barbados (West Indies)
- 1993–1995: Easterns (South Africa)
- Source: CricketArchive, 6 April 2016

Samuel McDonald Skeete (born 19 January 1967) is a former Barbadian cricketer who represented the Barbadian national team in West Indian domestic cricket. He also played three seasons of South African domestic cricket, representing Easterns.

A right-arm fast bowler, Skeete represented the West Indies under-19s at the 1988 Youth World Cup in Australia. He took 13 wickets from eight matches (including 4/20 against Sri Lanka and 3/25 against Pakistan), finishing as his team's leading wicket-taker and fifth overall. Skeete made his first-class debut for Barbados in January 1990, in a Red Stripe Cup match against the Leeward Islands. He went on to play a total of five seasons for Barbados, including in the regional limited-overs competition and against touring international teams. In total, Skeete took 52 first-class wickets from 18 matches for Barbados, with a best of 6/44 against Guyana in January 1991.

In 1993, Skeete signed with Eastern Transvaal (later known as simply Easterns), a team in South African domestic cricket. He made his first-class debut for the team in October 1993, in the UCB Bowl. Later in the 1993–94 season he also played two games for the Impalas (a team of players from smaller provincial boards) in the limited-overs Benson and Hedges Series. Skeete spent a total of three seasons as Easterns' overseas player, leaving midway through the 1995–96 season. In the 1994–95 UCB Bowl, he took 23 wickets from six matches, behind only Corrie Jordaan overall, and also scored 314 runs, which was the second-most for his team (behind Craig Norris). Against Border B, he scored his one and only first-class century. This was an innings of 119 from 93 balls made from eighth in the batting order, and including ten fours and nine sixes.
