= Adrian Tucker (cricketer) =

Australian cricketer (born 1969)

Personal information
- Born: 19 September 1969 (age 57); Sydney, Australia
- Source: ESPNcricinfo, 29 September 2016

Adrian Tucker (born 19 September 1969) is an Australian former cricketer. He played 17 first-class matches for New South Wales. He was also part of Australia's squad for the 1988 Youth Cricket World Cup.
