= Wil Parker =

Australian rules footballer and cricketer (born 2002)

Personal information
- Full name: Wil Brian Parker
- Born: 29 May 2002 (age 24); Croydon, Victoria, Australia
- Original team: Eastern Ranges (Talent League)
- Draft: Category B rookie selection, 2023
- Debut: Round 11, 2024, Collingwood vs. Fremantle, at Perth Stadium
- Height: 180 cm (5 ft 11 in)
- Position: Defender

Playing career^{1}
| Years | Club | Games (Goals) |
| 2024–2026 | Collingwood | 14 (1) |
| 2027– | Carlton | 0 (0) |
| Total | | 14 (1) |
- ^{1} Playing statistics correct to the end of the 2026 season.

Personal information
- Batting: Right-handed
- Bowling: Right-arm leg break
- Role: Bowler
- Relatives: Geoff Parker (uncle)

Domestic team information
- Years: Team
- 2019/20–2023/24: Victoria (squad no. 8)
- 2020/21–2022/23: Hobart Hurricanes

Career statistics
| Competition | FC | LA | T20 |
|---|---|---|---|
| Matches | 4 | 1 | 9 |
| Runs scored | 4 | 7 | 47 |
| Batting average | 2.00 | 7.00 | 11.75 |
| 100s/50s | 0/0 | 0/0 | 0/0 |
| Top score | 4 | 7 | 25* |
| Balls bowled | 360 | 44 | 108 |
| Wickets | 6 | 1 | 1 |
| Bowling average | 32.00 | 44.00 | 185.00 |
| 5 wickets in innings | 0 | 0 | 0 |
| 10 wickets in match | 0 | 0 | 0 |
| Best bowling | 3/54 | 1/44 | 1/42 |
| Catches/stumpings | 1/– | 1/– | 1/– |
- Source: ESPNcricinfo, 4 April 2023

Wil Brian Parker (born 29 May 2002) is a professional Australian rules football player playing for the Carlton Football Club in the Australian Football League (AFL), having previously played for the Collingwood Football Club. He is also a former domestic cricketer who played for the Victoria cricket team and the Hobart Hurricanes.

== Cricket career ==
Parker made his first-class debut on 14 February 2020, for Victoria in the 2019–20 Sheffield Shield season. He became the fourth-youngest cricketer to make their first-class debut for Victoria. His uncle, Geoff Parker, also played first-class cricket for Victoria.

In June 2020, Parker signed a professional contract with Victoria for the 2020–21 domestic season, opting to play cricket instead of Australian rules football, where he was touted as a potential early draft selection. He made his Twenty20 debut on 27 December 2020, for the Hobart Hurricanes, in the 2020–21 Big Bash League season. He made his List A debut on 10 March 2021, for Victoria in the 2020–21 Marsh One-Day Cup. At the end of the 2023-24 Sheffield Shield season and 2023–24 Marsh One-Day Cup he gave up his contract with Cricket Victoria to return to Australian rules football.

For Victoria he played 4 First-Class games, taking 6 wickets at an average of 32 and scoring 4 runs in 2 innings at an average of 2. Parker also represented Victoria in a solitary one-day match, taking 1 wicket for 44 and scoring 7 runs. In T20 cricket he played 9 games, taking 1 wicket for the cost of 185 runs and scoring 47 runs in 6 innings (with a high score of 25 against the Perth Scorchers in December 2021) at an average of 11.75.

== AFL career ==
For the 2024 AFL season, Parker signed with the Collingwood Football Club as a Category B Rookie. He made his debut against Fremantle in round 11.

Parker played 14 games for Collingwood over three seasons and was delisted following the 2026 AFL season.

After his departure from Collingwood, Parker signed with Carlton as a delisted free agent.

== Statistics ==
Updated to the end of the 2026 season.

Legend
| G | Goals | K | Kicks | D | Disposals | T | Tackles |
| B | Behinds | H | Handballs | M | Marks |

| Season | Team | No. | Games | Totals | | | | | | | Averages (per game) | | | | | | | Votes |
| Season | Team | No. | Games | G | B | K | H | D | M | T | G | B | K | H | D | M | T | Votes |
|---|---|---|---|---|---|---|---|---|---|---|---|---|---|---|---|---|---|---|
| 2024 | Collingwood | 45 | 5 | 1 | 0 | 24 | 18 | 42 | 6 | 12 | 0.2 | 0.0 | 4.8 | 3.6 | 8.4 | 1.2 | 2.4 | 0 |
| 2025 | Collingwood | 15 | 4 | 0 | 0 | 24 | 10 | 34 | 13 | 7 | 0.0 | 0.0 | 6.0 | 2.5 | 8.5 | 3.3 | 1.8 | 0 |
| 2026 | Collingwood | 15 | 5 | 0 | 0 | 27 | 28 | 55 | 16 | 6 | 0.0 | 0.0 | 5.4 | 5.6 | 11.0 | 3.2 | 1.2 | 0 |
| Career | | | 14 | 1 | 0 | 75 | 56 | 131 | 35 | 25 | 0.1 | 0.0 | 5.4 | 4.0 | 9.4 | 2.5 | 1.8 | 0 |
