= Chaminda Fernando =

Sri Lankan cricketer (born 1969)

Personal information
- Born: 31 October 1969 (age 57); Colombo, Sri Lanka
- Source: ESPNcricinfo, 30 September 2016

Chaminda Fernando (born 31 October 1969) is a Sri Lankan former cricketer. He played 51 first-class matches for Sinhalese Sports Club between 1988 and 1997. He was also part of Sri Lanka's squad for the 1988 Youth Cricket World Cup.
