= Dominique Lewis =

Grenadian cricketer (born 1962)

Personal information
- Born: 28 October 1962 (age 63); Grenada
- Batting: Right-handed
- Bowling: Right-arm fast-medium

Domestic team information
- Years: Team
- 1989: Windward Islands (West Indies)
- Source: CricketArchive, 6 August 2016

Dominique Lewis (born 28 October 1962) is a former Grenadian cricketer who represented the Windward Islands in West Indian domestic cricket. He played as a right-arm fast bowler.

Lewis made only two senior appearances for the Windwards, both during the 1988–89 season. The first was a four-day Red Stripe Cup match against Trinidad and Tobago, played in late February 1989. Lewis took 1/68 in the first innings and 2/26 in the second, and claimed the wicket of West Indies international Phil Simmons in both innings. His second appearance for the Windwards came early the following month, against Guyana in the final of the 1988–89 Geddes Grant Shield (a limited-overs competition). He took 1/26 from ten overs in Guyana's innings, helping to restrict Guyana to 154/9 from 50 overs. The Windward Islands went on to win the match by one wicket, with Lewis (10 not out) and opener Darwin Telemaque (44 not out) putting on a 17-run partnership for the tenth wicket.
