= Kapugama Priyantha =

Sri Lankan cricketer (born 1968)

Personal information
- Full name: Kapugama Geeganage Priyantha
- Born: 5 June 1968 (age 58); Matara, Sri Lanka
- Source: Cricinfo, 30 September 2016

Kapugama Priyantha (born 5 June 1968) is a Sri Lankan former cricketer. He played twenty-six first-class matches in Sri Lanka between 1988 and 1995. He was also part of Sri Lanka's squad for the 1988 Youth Cricket World Cup.
