= Zulfiqar Butt =

Pakistani cricketer (born 1971)

Personal information
- Born: 1 January 1971 (age 55); Lahore, Pakistan
- Source: ESPNcricinfo, 30 September 2016

Zulfiqar Butt (born 1 January 1971) is a Pakistani former cricketer. He played 42 first-class matches in Pakistan between 1984 and 1998, mainly as a slow left-arm orthodox spinner. He was also part of Pakistan's squad for the 1988 Youth Cricket World Cup.
