= Kanwar Virdi =

Indian cricketer (born 1969)

Personal information
- Born: 11 February 1969 (age 57)
- Source: ESPNcricinfo, 30 September 2016

Kanwar Virdi (born 11 February 1969) is an Indian former cricketer. He played seven first-class matches for Haryana between 1988 and 1990. He was also part of India's squad for the 1988 Youth Cricket World Cup. He belonged from Ramgharia clan of indo - scythian tribe.
