= Sam Parkinson =

Australian cricketer

Personal information
- Full name: Samuel David Haslam Parkinson
- Born: 8 August 1960 (age 66); Adelaide, South Australia, Australia
- Batting: Left-handed
- Bowling: Left-arm fast-medium
- Relatives: Son: Harry Parkinson Daughters: Emily Parkinson, Annabelle Parkinson and Alexandra Parkinson

Domestic team information
- Years: Team
- 1981/82–1987/88: South Australia
- 1981: Buckinghamshire

Career statistics
Competition	First-class	List A
Matches	36	10
Runs scored	376	13
Batting average	12.12	4.33
100s/50s	–/1	–/–
Top score	62	8
Balls bowled	6,451	395
Wickets	102	5
Bowling average	34.04	56.80
5 wickets in innings	4	–
10 wickets in match	–	–
Best bowling	7/98	2/43
Catches/stumpings	15/–	3/–
- Source: Cricinfo, 13 August 2011

Samuel David Haslam Parkinson (born 8 August 1960) is a former Australian cricketer. Parkinson was a left-handed batsman who bowled left-arm fast-medium. He was born in Adelaide, South Australia.

Parkinson played for Buckinghamshire 1981, making his debut for the English county in the Minor Counties Championship against Oxfordshire. He made 9 further appearances for Buckinghamshire in that season, the last of which came against Hertfordshire. Returning to Australia, Parkinson made his first-class debut for South Australia against New South Wales in the 1981–82 Sheffield Shield. He went on to make a further 35 first-class appearances for South Australia, the last of which came against Western Australia in the 1987–88 Sheffield Shield. In his 36 first-class appearances for South Australia, he took 102 wickets at an average of 34.04, with best figures of 7/98. These figures, one of four five wicket hauls he took, came against Western Australia in the 1982–83 Sheffield Shield. A lower order batsman, Parkinson scored 376 runs at a batting average of 12.12, with a single fifty score of 62, which came against Tasmania in the 1985–86 Sheffield Shield.

In the same season that he made his first-class debut, he also made his List A debut for South Australia against Victoria in the 1981–82 McDonald's Cup. Seen as a player better suited to the longer format of the game, he made just 9 further List A appearances for South Australia, the last of which came against Central Districts during South Australia's tour of New Zealand in 1986–87. He struggled with the ball in the shorter format of the game, taking just 5 wickets at an expensive average of 56.80, with best figures of 2/43.
