= Peter Dobbs =

New Zealand cricketer (born 1968)

Personal information
- Full name: Peter Wayne Dobbs
- Born: 20 February 1968 (age 58); Dunedin, New Zealand
- Batting: Right-handed

Domestic team information
- Years: Team
- 1988/89–1994/95: Otago
- Source: ESPNcricinfo, 8 May 2016

Peter Wayne Dobbs (born 20 February 1968) is a New Zealand former cricketer. He played 55 first-class and 34 List A matches between the 1988–89 and 1994–95 seasons, almost all of them for Otago.

Born at Dunedin, Dobbs played age-group cricket for Otago from the 1984–85 season and between 1985–86 and 1987–88 played three under-19 Test matches and 11 under-19 One Day International cricket for New Zealand Young Cricketers. He made his senior debut for Otago in a December 1988 one day match against Auckland and played regularly for the provincial representative side until the end of the 1994–95 season. In 55 first-class matches he scored 2,641 runs, including making three centuries. His highest score of 144 not out was made against Central Districts in March 1991. In List A cricket he scored 672 runs.
