= Wasim Ali (Pakistani cricketer) =

Pakistani cricketer (born 1969)

Personal information
- Born: 8 June 1969 (age 57); Lahore, Pakistan
- Source: ESPNcricinfo, 30 September 2016

Wasim Ali (born 8 June 1969) is a Pakistani former cricketer. He played 63 first-class matches in Pakistan between 1985 and 1994. He was also part of Pakistan's squad for the 1988 Youth Cricket World Cup.
