= Dilhan Perera =

Sri Lankan cricketer (born 1969)

Personal information
- Born: 16 September 1969 (age 57); Colombo, Sri Lanka
- Source: ESPNcricinfo, 30 September 2016

Dilhan Perera (born 16 September 1969) is a Sri Lankan former cricketer. He played nine first-class matches for Colombo Cricket Club between 1991 and 1993. He was also part of Sri Lanka's squad for the 1988 Youth Cricket World Cup.
