= Brett Williams (Australian cricketer) =

Australian cricketer (born 1967)

Personal information
- Full name: Brett Douglas Williams
- Born: 15 December 1967 (age 58); Camden, New South Wales
- Batting: Right-handed
- Bowling: Right-arm medium
- Role: All-rounder

Domestic team information
- Years: Team
- 1988/89–1989/90: South Australia

Career statistics
Competition	First-class	List A
Matches	4	3
Runs scored	240	43
Batting average	40.00	14.33
100s/50s	0/2	0/0
Top score	77	170
Balls bowled	90	102
Wickets	1	1
Bowling average	42.00	86.00
5 wickets in innings	0	0
10 wickets in match	0	0
Best bowling	1/21	1/46
Catches/stumpings	4/–	1/–
- Source: Cricinfo, 16 February 2016

Brett Douglas Williams (born 15 December 1967) is a former Australian cricketer. He was a right-handed medium-pace bowler and lower-order batsman. Williams was a member of the Australia national under-19 cricket team that won the 1988 Youth Cricket World Cup tournament played in Australia. He was the first cricketer to score a century in the U-19 World Cup final where he scored 108 against Pakistan in 1988 final.

He played four first-class and three List A matches for South Australia cricket team between 1988 and 1990 but never fulfilled the talent which he showed at under-19 level.
