= Robert Zadow =

Australian cricketer

Bob Zadow
Personal information
- Full name: Robert John Zadow
- Born: 17 January 1954 (age 72); Mannum, South Australia
- Batting: Right-handed

Domestic team information
- Years: Team
- 1979/80–1986/87: South Australia

Career statistics
Competition	First-class	List A
Matches	32	3
Runs scored	1,472	39
Batting average	26.28	13.00
100s/50s	2/5	0/0
Top score	144	22
Catches/stumpings	22/–	0/–
- Source: CricketArchive, 10 May 2012

Robert John Zadow (born 17 January 1954) is a former South Australian cricketer.

== Career ==
Zadow abandoned a promising Australian rules footballing career by moving to England in 1976 to play as an overseas amateur for Flowery Field Cricket Club in the Saddleworth and District League. He scored over 1000 runs as a right-handed batman despite missing the first six and last six games of the season. In 1977 he returned to Flowery Field Cricket Club as a professional.

From 1979/80 he started to play regular first-class cricket for South Australia and was soon chosen to captain the side. In 32 matches (59 innings) he scored 1472 runs at an average of 26.28 including 2 x 100s and 5 x 50s. Notable innings include a century against the touring Indian side captained by Kapil Dev and at that time he was being mentioned in the Australian press as a possible Test candidate.

After retirement from state cricket he went on to play for many years for his Adelaide grade club, Tea Tree Gully Cricket Club, where he became the highest run-scorer in South Australian grade cricket history with 9318, second only now to Wayne Bradbrook - Northern Districts CC with 9619 runs.

Zadow was, until recently, a state selector and served as South Australian Chairman of Selectors. He was also manager of the late cricket player and coach David Hookes at the time of Hookes's death.

The Rob Zadow Medal is presented to the best player of the South Australian one-day district grand final.
