= 1992–93 Sheffield Shield season =

Australian cricket tournament

- Cricket format: First-class
- Tournament format(s): Double round-robin & Final
- Champions: New South Wales (41st title)
- Participants: 6
- Matches: 31
- Player of the series: Jamie Siddons (South Australia)
- Most runs: Jamie Siddons (South Australia) (1116)
- Most wickets: Wayne Holdsworth (New South Wales) (53)

The 1992–93 Sheffield Shield season was the 91st season of the Sheffield Shield, the domestic first-class cricket competition of Australia. New South Wales won the championship.

== Table ==
Team	Played	Won	Lost	Tied	Drawn	N/R	Points
New South Wales	10	5	2	0	4	0	33.6
Queensland	10	3	4	0	3	0	26
Tasmania	10	2	2	0	7	0	22
Western Australia	10	3	3	0	4	0	21
South Australia	10	2	4	0	4	0	14
Victoria	10	0	2	0	8	0	12

== Final ==
Queensland	v	New South Wales (H)
311; Stuart Law 142; Glenn McGrath 4/64		341; Greg Matthews 78
75; Wayne Holdsworth 7/41; Glenn McGrath 3/28		46-2

New South Wales won by 8 wickets.
Venue: Sydney
