= Janardhanan Ramdas =

Indian cricketer (born 1970)

Personal information
- Born: 2 June 1970 (age 56); Madurai, Tamil Nadu, India
- Batting: Right-handed
- Bowling: Right arm off spin
- Role: All-rounder

Domestic team information
- Years: Team
- 1988/89–1989/90: Tamil Nadu
- FC debut: 13 January 1990 Tamil Nadu v Andhra
- Last FC: 29 January 1990 Tamil Nadu v Goa
- Only LA: 12 March 1989 Tamil Nadu v Delhi

Career statistics
Competition	First-class	List A
Matches	3	1
Runs scored	4	2
Batting average	1.33	2.00
100s/50s	0/0	0/0
Top score	4	2
Balls bowled	396	30
Wickets	3	1
Bowling average	52.00	22.00
5 wickets in innings	0	0
10 wickets in match	0	0
Best bowling	2/54	1/22
Catches/stumpings	3/–	0/–
- Source: CricketArchive, 30 September 2008

Janardhanan Ramdas (born 2 June 1970), is an Indian cricketer. He is a right-handed batsman and a right-arm offbreak bowler. Janardhanan Ramdas was considered as an all-rounder and was selected as the Captain of the U-19 team that toured Pakistan in 1988/89 season. During the 4 test series, he led India U-19 team to its first victory ever as well as achieved it in foreign soil.

Janardhanan Ramdas soon quit the game after just 3 first class matches and 1 List A match.
