= 1993–94 Sheffield Shield season =

Australian cricket tournament

- Cricket format: First-class
- Tournament format(s): Double round-robin & Final
- Champions: New South Wales (42nd title)
- Participants: 6
- Matches: 31
- Player of the series: Matthew Hayden (Queensland)
- Most runs: Michael Bevan (New South Wales) (1240)
- Most wickets: Colin Miller (Tasmania) (40)

The 1993–94 Sheffield Shield season was the 92nd season of the Sheffield Shield, the domestic first-class cricket competition of Australia. New South Wales won the championship.

== Table ==
Team	Played	Won	Lost	Tied	Drawn	N/R	Points
New South Wales	10	6	3	0	1	0	38
Tasmania	10	3	1	0	6	0	24
Western Australia	10	3	3	0	4	0	23.8
Victoria	10	3	3	0	4	0	21
South Australia	10	2	5	0	3	0	20
Queensland	10	2	4	0	4	0	18

== Final ==
Tasmania	v	New South Wales (H)
255; Brad McNamara 4/24		442; Brad McNamara 128; Michael Bevan 113
126; Phil Alley 5/24; Neil Maxwell 4/50

New South Wales won by an innings and 61 runs.
Venue: Sydney
