= Sanath Fernando =

Sri Lankan cricketer (born 1969)

Personal information
- Born: 29 June 1969 (age 57); Moratuwa, Sri Lanka
- Source: Cricinfo, 10 February 2016

Sanath Fernando (born 29 June 1969) is a Sri Lankan former first-class cricketer who played for Old Cambrians Sports Club and Sebastianites Cricket and Athletic Club.
