= Rohan Weerakkody =

Sri Lankan cricketer (born 1968)

Cricket information
- Batting: Right-handed
- Bowling: Right-arm fast-medium

Career statistics
| Competition | First-class | List A |
|---|---|---|
| Matches | 10 | 4 |
| Runs scored | 161 | 30 |
| Batting average | 13.41 | 30.00 |
| 100s/50s | 0/0 | 0/0 |
| Top score | 32 | 30 |
| Balls bowled | 1055 | 138 |
| Wickets | 26 | 6 |
| Bowling average | 21.34 | 16.83 |
| 5 wickets in innings | 2 | 0 |
| 10 wickets in match | 0 | 0 |
| Best bowling | 5/46 | 4/24 |
| Catches/stumpings | 6/– | 1/– |
- Source: CricketArchive, 1 November 2022

Rohan Nishantha Weerakkody (born 30 April 1968) is a former Sri Lankan cricketer. Making his known debut for the Sri Lankan Young Cricketers side (the original name of the Sri Lankan U-19 cricket team), he went on to captain the side on 7 occasions during the 1987/88 Youth World Cup, winning 3 matches but losing 4 and failing to qualify beyond the Group Stage. He went on to play domestic cricket professionally for Nondescripts Cricket Club at both First-class and List A level.

He played primarily a bowler, with a good bowling average in the low 20s-high 10s at senior level.
