= 1991–92 Sheffield Shield season =

Australian cricket tournament

- Cricket format: First-class
- Tournament format(s): Double round-robin & Final
- Champions: Western Australia (13th title)
- Participants: 6
- Matches: 31
- Player of the series: Tony Dodemaide (Victoria)
- Most runs: Matthew Hayden (Queensland) (982)
- Most wickets: Greg Matthews (New South Wales) (49)

The 1991–92 Sheffield Shield season was the 90th season of the Sheffield Shield, the domestic first-class cricket competition of Australia. Western Australia won the championship.

== Table ==
Team	Played	Won	Lost	Tied	Drawn	N/R	Points
Western Australia	10	4	2	0	4	0	28
New South Wales	10	4	3	0	3	0	28
Victoria	10	2	0	0	8	0	24
Queensland	10	2	3	0	5	0	16
South Australia	10	2	4	0	4	0	14
Tasmania	10	1	3	0	6	0	14

== Final ==
(H) Western Australia	v	New South Wales
396; Tom Moody 78; Wayne Andrews 73		415; Mark Waugh 163; Steve Waugh 113; Jo Angel 4/82
344; Justin Langer 149; Tim Zoehrer 81; Mike Whitney 7/75		281; Steve Small 98

Western Australia won by 44 runs.
Venue: Perth
