= Shakeel Khan (cricketer) =

Pakistani cricketer (born 1968)

Cricket information
- Batting: Right-handed
- Bowling: Right-arm medium-fast

International information
- National side: Pakistan
- Only ODI (cap 63): 22 November 1987 v England

Career statistics
Competition	ODI
Matches	1
Runs scored	0
Batting average	0.00
100s/50s	0/0
Top score	0
Balls bowled	54
Wickets	1
Bowling average	50.00
5 wickets in innings	0
10 wickets in match	0
Best bowling	1/50
Catches/stumpings	0/–
- Source: CricInfo, 3 May 2006

Shakeel Ahmed Khan (born 28 May 1968) is a Pakistani former cricketer who played for the Pakistan national cricket team in 1987. He was born at Lahore.

A medium-pace bowler for Habib Bank cricket team, Khan was selected for the national team following an injury to Wasim Akram. In his only international game against England at Arbab Niaz Stadium in Peshawar, he bowled nine overs, took the wicket of Chris Broad, and conceded 50 runs. After his retirement from cricket, he became part of the Pakistan Cricket Board's media cell.
