= Under-19 Men's Cricket World Cup =

U19 Men's ODI Cricket World Cup

ICC Under-19 Men's Cricket World Cup
- Administrator: International Cricket Council
- First edition: 1988 Australia
- Latest edition: 2026 Zimbabwe, Namibia
- Next edition: 2028 TBD
- Tournament format: Round-robin; Knock-out
- Number of teams: 16 (23 from 2028)
- Current champion: India (6th title)
- Most successful: India (6 titles)
- Most runs: (Ireland) Eoin Morgan (606)
- Most wickets: (Zimbabwe) Wesley Madhevere (28) (South Africa) Kwena Maphaka (28)
- Website: icc-cricket.com/tournaments/u19cricketworldcup

The ICC Under-19 Men's Cricket World Cup is an international cricket tournament organised by the International Cricket Council contested by national under-19 teams. First contested in 1988, as the Youth Cricket World Cup, it was not staged again until 1998. Since then, the World Cup has been held as a biennial event, organised by the ICC. The first edition of the tournament had only eight participants, but every subsequent edition has included sixteen teams. Among the full members, India have won the World Cup on a record six occasions, while Australia have won four times, Pakistan twice, and Bangladesh, England, South Africa and the West Indies once each. New Zealand and Sri Lanka have reached tournament finals without winning. India are the current champions, having defeated England by 100 runs in the final of the 2026 World Cup

== History ==
Men's U-19 Cricket World Cup winners
Year	Champions
1988	Australia
1998	England
2000	India
2002	Australia (2)
2004	Pakistan
2006	Pakistan (2)
2008	India (2)
2010	Australia (3)
2012	India (3)
2014	South Africa
2016	West Indies
2018	India (4)
2020	Bangladesh
2022	India (5)
2024	Australia (4)
2026	India (6)

=== 1988 (Winner: Australia) ===
The inaugural event was titled the McDonald's Bicentennial Youth World Cup, and was held in 1988 as part of the Australian Bicentenary celebrations. It took place in South Australia and Victoria. Teams from the seven Test-playing nations, as well as an ICC Associates XI, competed in a round-robin format. Australia lost only one match, their final round-robin game against Pakistan by which time they had qualified for the semis. They went on to beat Pakistan by five wickets in the final, thanks to an unbeaten hundred from Brett Williams. England and West Indies made up the last four, but India were the real disappointments. After opening with a good win against England, they suffered hefty defeats in four matches to be knocked out early. The tournament was notable for the number of future international players who competed. Future England captains Nasser Hussain and Mike Atherton played, as did Indian spinner Venkatapathy Raju, New Zealand all-rounder Chris Cairns, Pakistanis Mushtaq Ahmed and Inzamam-ul-Haq, Sri Lankan Sanath Jayasuriya, and West Indians Brian Lara, Ridley Jacobs, and Jimmy Adams. Australia's Brett Williams was the leading run-scorer, with 471 runs at an average of 52.33. Wayne Holdsworth from Australia and Mushtaq Ahmed from Pakistan were the leading wicket-takers, with 19 wickets at averages of 12.52 and 16.21, respectively.

=== 1998 (Winner: England) ===
England were the unexpected winners of the second Under-19 World Cup in South Africa. In 1998, the event was relaunched in South Africa as a biennial tournament. The only previous tournament of its kind was held ten years earlier. In addition to the nine Test-playing nations, there were teams from Bangladesh, Kenya, Scotland, Ireland, Denmark, Namibia and Papua New Guinea. The teams were divided into four pools, named after Gavaskar, Sobers, Cowdrey and Bradman, and the top two teams from each progressed to two Super League pools, whose winners advanced to the final. In order to give everyone a decent amount of cricket, the non-qualifiers competed in a Plate League, won by Bangladesh, who beat West Indies in the final. West Indies failed to qualify for the Super League after a fiasco concerning the composition of their squad – they arrived with seven players who contravened the age restrictions for the tournament. The Super League, in which every game was covered live on South African satellite television, also threw up a number of shocks and tense finishes; both pools came down to net run-rate at the finish. England, from being down and almost out, beat Pakistan – who surprisingly lost all three of their games – but lost a rain-affected match to India. Australia had beaten India and Pakistan and were favourites to reach the final. Only a massive defeat by England could deny them: but that is precisely what they suffered. In front of a crowd of about 6,000 at Newlands, they were bowled out for 147. New Zealand joined England in the final, where a century from England's Stephen Peters won the day. Chris Gayle was the tournament's leading run-scorer, with 364 runs at an average of 72.80. West Indian Ramnaresh Sarwan and Zimbabwean Mluleki Nkala were the leading wicket-takers, with 16 wickets at 10.81 and 13.06 respectively.

=== 2000 (Winner: India) ===
The 2000 tournament was held in Sri Lanka, and replicated the format from 1998. Participating nations included the nine Test-playing nations, as well as Bangladesh, Kenya, Ireland, Namibia, Holland, Nepal and a combined team from the Americas development region. To the disappointment of a large crowd at Colombo's SSC, Sri Lanka fell at the final hurdle in a final dominated by India. The winners remained unbeaten throughout, and destroyed Australia by 170 runs in the semi-final to underline their supremacy. In the other semi-final, Sri Lanka delighted a crowd of 5000 at Galle by beating Pakistan. The fact that three of the four semi-finalists were from Asia and so more attuned to the conditions was coincidental – they played the better cricket and, in Pakistan's case, had a very experienced squad. England, the defending champions, were most disappointing, and they won only one match against a Test-playing country, and that a last-ball victory over Zimbabwe. South Africa, one of the favourites, were desperately unlucky to be eliminated after three no-results gave them three points while Nepal, with four points courtesy of one win over Kenya, went through to the Super League instead. The format of the tournament was as in 1997–98, with four groups of four and then a Super League and final. Graeme Smith was the tournament's leading run-scorer, with 348 runs at an average of 87.00. Pakistan's Zahid Saeed was the leading wicket-taker, with 15 wickets at 7.60. India's Yuvraj Singh was named Man of the Series. India clinched the title for the first time under the captaincy of Mohammed Kaif.

=== 2002 (Winner: Australia) ===
The fourth Under-19 World Cup held in New Zealand only confirmed Australia's dominance of the game, and from their opening match, when they obliterated Kenya by 430 runs, through to their comprehensive victory over South Africa in the final, they were never threatened. Participating nations included the ten Test-playing nations, plus Canada, Kenya, Namibia, Nepal, Papua New Guinea, and Scotland. Their captain, Cameron White, was singled out for praise for his leadership, and he chipped in with 423 runs at 70.50. And they didn't rely on pace either, playing only two seamers and four slow bowlers, with Xavier Doherty, a slow left-armer, leading the wicket-takers with 16 at 9.50 and all without a single wide. In contrast, India, the holders, underperformed in their semi-final against South Africa, a team they had easily beaten a week or so earlier. They also suffered embarrassing defeats to neighbours Pakistan and Bangladesh. Pakistan, however, provided the main upset when they lost to Nepal by 30 runs, and Nepal also gave England a few uneasy moments. Zimbabwe won the plate competition, with their expected opponents, Bangladesh, beaten in the semi-final by Nepal. Australian Cameron White was the tournament's leading run-scorer, with 423 runs at an average of 70.50 and Xavier Doherty was the leading wicket-taker, with 16 wickets at 9.50. Tatenda Taibu, Zimbabwe's captain, was Man of the Series for his 250 runs and 12 wickets, not to mention his wicket-keeping in between bowling stints.

=== 2004 (Winner: Pakistan) ===
The 2004 tournament was held in Bangladesh. More than 350,000 spectators saw the 54 matches played in the tournament. The finale ended with a close final between the two best teams – West Indies and Pakistan. It was won by Pakistan by 25 runs against West Indies and a 30,000 crowd acclaimed the victorious Pakistanis almost as their own. The shock was the elimination from the main competition of holders Australia, bowled out for 73 and beaten by Zimbabwe in the group stage when Tinashe Panyangara took 6 for 31, the second-best figures in the competition's history. Australia then lost to Bangladesh in the plate final amid thumping drums and gleeful celebrations. The downside was the quality of the cricket, which was often mediocre on some indifferent pitches, and the reporting of six unidentified bowlers for having suspect actions. Pakistan would have finished unbeaten but for a hiccup against England – when both teams had already qualified for the semis. England reached the last four, which was progress, and Alastair Cook looked a class apart. But they came unstuck against West Indies' spinners in the semi-final. India completed the semi-finalists. Shikhar Dhawan and Suresh Raina were the backbone of a strong batting line-up, and Raina's 90 from just 38 balls against the hapless Scots was as brutal an innings as one will see at any level. The captain Ambati Rayudu had been hailed as the next great batting hope, having scored a century and a double in a first-class match at the age of 17. But he did not score the runs promised and was banned by the referee John Morrison from the semi-final after allowing a funereal over-rate during the Super League win against Sri Lanka: eight overs were bowled in the first 50 minutes. Shikhar Dhawan was named Man of the Tournament, and was the tournament's leading run-scorer, with 505 runs at an average of 84.16. Bangladeshi Enamul Haque was the leading wicket-taker, with 22 wickets at 10.18.

=== 2006 (Winner: Pakistan) ===
This tournament was going to struggle to live up to the overwhelming response that greeted the previous event in Bangladesh. Despite free tickets the matches were sparsely attended even when the home team were in action, but it shouldn't detract from an impressive two weeks which finished with Pakistan securing their second consecutive title in an extraordinary final against India at the Premadasa Stadium. Pakistan crumbled to 109, but in a thrilling passage of play reduced India to 9 for 6. Nasir Jamshed, and Anwar Ali, two of the success stories of the tournament, did the damage and there was no way back for India who fell 38 runs short. These two teams and Australia were the pick of the teams and along with England – who surpassed expectation to reach the semi-finals after beating a talented Bangladesh team – made up the final four. A number of players caught the eye, notably Australia captain Moises Henriques, the Indian batsmen Cheteshwar Pujara – the tournament's leading run-scorer – and teammate Rohit Sharma, along with legspinner Piyush Chawla, who a few weeks later made his Test debut against England. However, perhaps the best story of the tournament was Nepal claiming the Plate trophy after a thrilling victory against New Zealand, having also beaten South Africa during the event

=== 2008 (Winner: India) ===
It was the first time the tournament was held in an Associate Member country. The 2008 Under-19 Cricket World Cup was held in Malaysia from 17 February to 2 March 2008. Along with hosts, 15 other teams battled in 44 matches packed into 15 days across three cities. India, still smarting from the loss in the previous edition had reason to be upbeat with Tanmay Srivastava, a mature batsman who eventually finished as the tournament's leading run-getter, in their ranks. Australia and England had forgettable campaigns, coming up short against the big teams after making mincemeat of the minnows. Defending champions Pakistan were fortuitous to reach the semi-finals as their batsmen never really got going and, against South Africa in the semi-finals, Pakistan had to chase 261. New Zealand, boosted by Man of the Tournament Tim Southee, were impressive before losing to India in a narrow run-chase under lights and cloudy skies in the other semi-final. South Africa's captain Wayne Parnell had played a major role in ensuring their passage to the summit clash, picking up the most wickets in the tournament en route. But they had lost to India in the group stages and lightning did strike twice. India under the leadership of Virat Kohli, after being bowled out for 159, emerged triumphant by 12 runs under the D/L method and were crowned champions for the second time.

=== 2010 (Winner: Australia) ===
The 2010 Under-19 Cricket World Cup was held in New Zealand in January 2010. The better-funded big nations dominated. South Africa did beat Australia in a good match but a dead rubber. The competition came alive in the quarter-finals as West Indies beat England and Sri Lanka defeated South Africa. The best tie of the competition came when Pakistan beat fierce rivals India by two wickets with three balls remaining in a low-scoring match. The final between Australia and Pakistan was a rematch of the first tournament, and Australia won by 25 runs in a game where fortunes ebbed and flowed throughout.

=== 2012 (Winner: India) ===
The 2012 Under-19 Cricket World Cup was held in the Tony Ireland Stadium, Australia. Along with the ten test playing nations, Afghanistan, Nepal, Papua New Guinea, Ireland, Scotland and Namibia also participated in this tournament. Australia lost against India in the final on 26 August 2012. India's third U19 World Cup meant they tied for the most wins with Australia. Sri Lanka could not go through into the last eight but won the Plate championship by defeating Afghanistan by 7 wickets. Reece Topley of England was the highest wicket taker whereas Anamul Haque of Bangladesh was the top run getter. India won the final against Australia with 14 balls to spare ank'lld 6 wickets remaining. Captain Unmukt Chand played a match winning knock of 111* not out in 130 balls with the help of 6 sixes & 7 fours. Sandeep Sharma also excelled with four wickets under his belt.

=== 2014 (Winner: South Africa) ===
The 2014 Under-19 Cricket World-Cup was held in Dubai (U.A.E.) in 2014. It was the first time that U.A.E. had hosted an ICC event. Afghanistan was the only non-full member to qualify for the Quarter Finals. This was the first time that Afghanistan reached the last eight of this tournament, courtesy of their stellar performance against Australia in the group stage. In fact, this was the second time that a non-test playing nation qualified for the Super League/Quarter Finals, Nepal being the first one in the 2000 edition. India wobbled in the Quarter Finals against England and finally lost in the final over. This was the first semi-final berth for England in the last four editions. Pakistan beat England in the semis to reach its fifth Under-19 Final, becoming the first team to do so. South Africa beat Australia in the second semi-final. In a one-sided final, South Africa beat Pakistan and claimed its maiden U-19 World Cup title. Corbin Bosch, son of former South African cricketer late Tertius Bosch, was the Man of the Match in the finals and Aiden Markram was the Man of the Series. South Africa did not lose even a single match in the entire tournament.

=== 2016 (Winner: West Indies) ===
The 2016 Under-19 Cricket World Cup was held in Bangladesh. It was the eleventh edition of the Under-19 World Cup, and the second to be held in Bangladesh. On 5 January 2016, Australia announced that the Australian squad had pulled out of the tournament, citing security reasons. Defending champions South Africa were knocked out of the earthtournament in the group stage, with back-to-back defeats to Bangladesh and Namibia. This was the first time that two non-test playing nations – Nepal and Namibia – qualified for the Super League/Quarterfinals. The West Indies defeated India by five wickets in the final, claiming their first title. Bangladesh's captain Mehedi Hasan was named player of the tournament, while England's Jack Burnham and Namibia's Fritz Coetzee led the tournament in runs and wickets respectively.

=== 2018 (Winner: India) ===
The 2018 Under-19 Cricket World Cup was held in New Zealand. India and Australia played in the finals at Mount Maunganui on 3 Feb 2018. It was the 12th Edition of the Under-19 World Cup. India defeated Australia by 8 wickets, with Manjot Kalra scoring a match-winning 101* under the captaincy of Prithvi Shaw . The Man of the match was awarded to Manjot Kalra, while player of the tournament was awarded to Shubman Gill. India now holds the most wins record in Under-19 World Cup. Rahul Dravid is the head coach of this India Under-19 Team. Later he was appointed as India national cricket team head coach on Nov 2021

=== 2020 (Winner: Bangladesh) ===
The 2020 Under-19 Cricket World Cup was held in South Africa. The thirteenth edition of the Under-19 World Cup, and the second to be held in South Africa. The final was played between India and Bangladesh which Bangladesh won after defeating India by 3 wickets in the final match at Potchefstroom, South Africa, based on Duckworth Lewis Method on 9 Feb 2020. This was Bangladesh's first ICC Under-19 World Cup victory.

In the final, India, batting first gathered 177 runs before being all out. In reply, Bangladesh made a flying start as they scored 55 runs losing only a wicket in first 10 overs. Soon Indian leggie Ravi Bishnoi picked up four quick wickets as Bangladesh were 102 for 6 from 62/2 at the end of 25 overs. When Bangladesh were 163/7 at the end of 41 overs and the still needing 15 runs to win, rain arrives and the match was reduced to 46 overs with a revised target as per DLS method was seven runs needing from 30 balls. From thereon, Bangladesh did not take any unnecessary risks and scored the winning run with 23 balls to spare thanks to the innings of captain Akbar Ali and won their first ICC title by three wickets.

Top performers of the tournament were both Indians in batting or bowling. Yashasvi Jaiswal scored 400 runs throughout the tournament while Ravi Bishnoi took 17 wickets.

=== 2022 (Winner: India) ===
The 2022 Under-19 Cricket World Cup was held in the West Indies. The fourteenth edition of the Under-19 World Cup, and the first to be held in Caribbean. The final was played between India and England which India won after defeating England by 4 wickets in the final match at North Sound, Antigua. This was India's fifth ICC Under-19 World Cup victory, the maximum by any country.

In the final, England, batting first gathered 189 runs before being all out. In reply, India attained the required target in 47.4 overs, after losing 6 wickets. Yash Dhull walks up to collect the Under 19 World Cup trophy from Sir Richie Richardson to become the fifth Indian captain to win the title after Mohammad Kaif, Virat Kohli, Unmukt Chand and Prithvi Shaw. Dewald Brevis of South Africa scored the maximum runs (506) in the tournament and was named the player of the series. Dunith Wellalage of Sri Lanka had highest wickets of his name with 17 wickets.

=== 2024 (Winner: Australia) ===
The 2024 Under-19 Cricket World Cup was held in South Africa. The fifteenth edition of the Under-19 World Cup, and the third to be held in South Africa. It was originally scheduled to be held in Sri Lanka, but its hosting was pulled in November 2023 after Sri Lanka Cricket was suspended by the ICC. The final was played between Australia and India which Australia won after defeating India by 79 runs in the final match at Willowmoore Park, Benoni. This was Australia's fourth ICC Under-19 World Cup victory. South Africa's Kwena Maphaka was named played of the tournament.

Australia defeated India by 79 runs in the final. The Man of the match was awarded to Mahli Beardman who took 3 wickets for 15 runs in the final match. The performers of the tournament were, Uday Saharan from India (397 runs) and Kwena Maphaka from South Africa (21 wickets). The latter was also awarded as the player of the tournament.

=== 2026 (Winner: India) ===
India's U19 team dominated the ICC Under-19 World Cup 2026 through consistent all-round excellence from start to finish, going unbeaten throughout the tournament and finishing top of their group and Super Six stage with convincing wins before a strong semifinal victory over Afghanistan to book their place in the final. In the championship match against England at Harare, India's batting was particularly dominant — they posted a massive 411/9, the highest team total ever in a U19 final, powered by a sensational 175-run innings from 14-year-old Vaibhav Sooryavanshi that broke multiple U19 records and set up an imposing target. Their bowlers then backed up the batting display by restricting England to 311, leading to a comfortable 100-run win and India's record-extending sixth U19 World Cup title, showcasing depth in batting, effective bowling attacks, and strategic leadership throughout the event. Ayush Mhatre became the sixth Indian captain to win the title after Mohammad Kaif, Virat Kohli, Unmukt Chand, Prithvi Shaw and Yash Dhull.

=== Age qualification and controversies ===
The ICC's player eligibility regulations require participants in the Under-19 World Cup to be under the age of 19 as of a specified date. For the 2026 Under-19 World Cup, held in January 2026, players who had yet to have their 19th birthday by 31 August 2025 were eligible for selection. In 2020, the ICC introduced a minimum age requirement of 15 for all international cricket, including under-19 matches, which applies unless special dispensation is granted.

Instances of age fraud have been a regular occurrence in Under-19 World Cups, particularly in South Asian countries where birth records may not exist or are easily forged. The Board of Control for Cricket in India introduced bone density tests in 2012 as an additional method of verifying age and in 2016 introduced a rule that players would only be allowed to compete in one edition of the Under-19 World Cup.

In 2016, Indian cricketer Kaustubh Pawar alleged that Nepal under-19 captain Raju Rijal was at least 24 years old and had previously played cricket in India under a different name. An ICC investigation was unable to prove fraud. In 2020, Indian player Manjot Kalra – who was man of the match in India's 2018 Under-19 World Cup final victory over Australia – was suspended for two years after a police investigation found he committed age fraud during his junior career.

== Results ==
Year	Host(s)	Final venue	Winner	Margin	Runner-up	Teams
1988	Australia	Adelaide Oval, Adelaide	Australia; 202/5 (45.5 overs)	Australia won by 5 wickets scorecard	Pakistan; 201 (49.3 overs)	8
1998	South Africa	Wanderers Stadium, Johannesburg	England; 242/3 (46 overs)	England won by 7 wickets scorecard	New Zealand; 241/6 (50 overs)	16
2000	Sri Lanka	Sinhalese Sports Club Ground, Colombo	India; 180/4 (40.4 overs)	India won by 6 wickets scorecard	Sri Lanka; 178 (48.1 overs)	16
2002	New Zealand	Bert Sutcliffe Oval, Lincoln	Australia; 209/3 (45.1 overs)	Aus won by 7 wickets scorecard	South Africa; 206/9 (50 overs)	16
2004	Bangladesh	Bangabandhu National Stadium, Dhaka	Pakistan; 230/9 (50 overs)	Pakistan won by 25 runs scorecard	West Indies; 205 (47.1 overs)	16
2006	Sri Lanka	R. Premadasa Stadium, Colombo	Pakistan; 109 (41.1 overs)	Pakistan won by 38 runs scorecard	India; 71 (18.5 overs)	16
2008	Malaysia	Kinrara Academy Oval, Puchong	India; 159 (45.4 overs)	India won by 12 runs (D/L) scorecard	South Africa; 103/8 (25 overs)	16
2010	New Zealand	Bert Sutcliffe Oval, Lincoln	Australia; 207/9 (50 overs)	Australia won by 25 runs scorecard	Pakistan; 182 (46.4 overs)	16
2012	Australia	Tony Ireland Stadium, Townsville	India; 227/4 (47.4 overs)	India won by 6 wickets scorecard	Australia; 225/8 (50 overs)	16
2014	United Arab Emirates	Dubai International Cricket Stadium, Dubai	South Africa; 134/4 (42.1 overs)	South Africa won by 6 wickets scorecard	Pakistan; 131 (44.3 overs)	16
2016	Bangladesh	Sher-e-Bangla National Cricket Stadium, Dhaka	West Indies; 146/5 (49.3 overs)	West Indies won by 5 wickets scorecard	India; 145 (45.1 overs)	16
2018	New Zealand	Bay Oval, Mount Maunganui	India; 220/2 (38.5 overs)	India won by 8 wickets scorecard	Australia; 216 (47.2 overs)	16
2020	South Africa	Senwes Park, Potchefstroom	Bangladesh; 170/7 (42.1 overs)	Bangladesh won by 3 wickets (D/L) scorecard	India; 177 (47.2 overs)	16
2022	West Indies	Sir Vivian Richards Stadium, Antigua and Barbuda	India; 195/6 (47.4 overs)	India won by 4 wickets scorecard	England; 189 (44.5 overs)	16
2024	South Africa	Willowmoore Park, Benoni	Australia; 253/7 (50 overs)	Australia won by 79 runs scorecard	India; 174 (43.5 overs)	16
2026	Zimbabwe; Namibia	Harare Sports Club, Harare	India; 411/9 (50 overs)	India won by 100 runs scorecard	England; 311 (40.2 overs)	16
2028	To be decided					23

=== Plate League ===
Year	Host(s)	Final venue	Winner	Margin	Runner-up
1998	South Africa	Gert van Rensburg Stadium, Fochville	Bangladesh; 245/4 (46.5 overs)	Bangladesh won by 6 wickets scorecard	West Indies; 243/8 (50 overs)
2000	Sri Lanka	Asgiriya Stadium, Kandy	South Africa; 213 (49.4 overs)	South Africa won by 80 runs scorecard	Bangladesh; 133 (47.5 overs)
2002	New Zealand	Lincoln No. 3, Lincoln	Zimbabwe; 247/1 (50 overs)	Zimbabwe won by 137 runs scorecard	Nepal; 110 (35.4 overs)
2004	Bangladesh	Fatullah Osmani Stadium, Fatullah	Bangladesh; 257/9 (50 overs)	Bangladesh won by 8 runs scorecard	Australia; 249 (49.3 overs)
2006	Sri Lanka	Paikiasothy Saravanamuttu Stadium, Colombo	Nepal; 205/9 (49.4 overs)	Nepal won by 1 wicket scorecard	New Zealand; 204 (49.2 overs)
2008	Malaysia	Bayuemas Oval, Kuala Lumpur	West Indies; 78/3 (14.2 overs)	West Indies won by 7 wickets scorecard	Nepal; 74 (25.3 overs)
2010	New Zealand	McLean Park, Napier	Bangladesh; 307/8 (50 overs)	Bangladesh won by 195 runs scorecard	Ireland; 112 (38.5 overs)
2012	Australia	Allan Border Field, Brisbane	Sri Lanka; 196/3 (39 overs)	Sri Lanka won by 7 wickets scorecard	Afghanistan; 194/9 (50 overs)
2014	United Arab Emirates	Sheikh Zayed Cricket Stadium, Abu Dhabi	Bangladesh; 223 (47 overs)	Bangladesh won by 77 runs scorecard	New Zealand; 146/9 (50 overs)
2016	Bangladesh	Sheikh Kamal International Stadium, Cox's Bazar	Afghanistan; 218/5 (46.5 overs)	Afghanistan won by 5 wickets scorecard	Zimbabwe; 216/9 (50 overs)
2018	New Zealand	Bert Sutcliffe Oval, Lincoln	Sri Lanka; 255/7 (49.4 overs)	Sri Lanka won by 3 wickets scorecard	West Indies; 254/5 (50 overs)
2020	South Africa	Willowmoore Park, Benoni	England; 279/7 (50 overs)	England won by 152 runs scorecard	Sri Lanka; 127 (31 overs)
2022	West Indies	Queen's Park Oval, Port-of-Spain	United Arab Emirates; 128/2 (26 overs)	United Arab Emirates won by 8 wickets scorecard	Ireland; 122 (45.3 overs)

== Summary ==
In the table below, teams are sorted by best performance, then winning percentage, then (if equal) by alphabetical order.

As of 6 February 2026

Team	Appearances			Best result	Statistics					
Team	Total	First	Latest	Best result	Played	Won	Lost	Tie	NR	Win%
India	16	1988	2026	Champions (2000, 2008, 2012, 2018, 2022, 2026)	103	82	20	0	1	80.39
Australia	15	1988	2026	Champions (1988, 2002, 2010, 2024)	98	72	22	0	4	76.59
Pakistan	16	1988	2026	Champions (2004, 2006)	96	69	26	0	1	72.63
Bangladesh	15	1998	2026	Champions (2020)	92	60	28	1	3	67.98
South Africa	15	1998	2026	Champions (2014)	90	57	32	0	1	64.04
England	16	1988	2026	Champions (1998)	99	62	36	0	1	63.26
West Indies	16	1988	2026	Champions (2016)	99	60	37	0	2	61.85
Sri Lanka	16	1988	2026	Runner-up (2000)	96	53	42	0	1	55.78
New Zealand	15	1988	2026	Runner-up (1998)	87	37	46	0	4	44.57
Afghanistan	9	2010	2026	4th place (2018, 2022, 2026)	50	25	25	0	0	50.00
Zimbabwe	15	1998	2026	6th place (2004)	89	37	52	0	0	41.57
Namibia	10	1998	2024	7th place (2016)	57	10	46	1	0	18.42
Nepal	8	2000	2024	8th place (2000, 2016)	48	22	25	0	1	46.80
United Arab Emirates	3	2014	2022	9th place (2022)	18	7	11	0	0	38.88
Ireland	12	1998	2026	10th place (2010, 2022)	71	25	45	1	0	35.91
Scotland	11	1998	2026	11th place (2012)	60	14	46	0	0	23.33
Kenya	4	1998	2018	11th place (1998)	23	6	17	0	0	26.09
Canada	8	2002	2022	11th place (2010)	46	8	35	1	2	20.66
United States	4	2006	2026	12th place (2006)	19	3	14	0	2	17.64
Papua New Guinea	9	1998	2022	12th place (2008, 2010)	52	3	49	0	0	5.76
Denmark	1	1998	1998	13th place (1998)	6	2	4	0	0	33.33
Uganda	3	2004	2022	13th place (2022)	18	4	14	0	0	22.22
Netherlands	1	2000	2000	14th place (2000)	6	1	4	0	1	20.00
Hong Kong	1	2010	2010	14th place (2010)	6	1	5	0	0	16.67
Japan	2	2020	2026	14th place (2026)	10	1	8	0	1	11.11
Bermuda	1	2008	2008	15th place (2008)	5	1	4	0	0	20.00
Nigeria	1	2020	2020	15th place (2020)	6	1	5	0	0	16.67
Malaysia	1	2008	2008	16th place (2008)	5	1	4	0	0	20.00
Fiji	1	2016	2016	16th place (2016)	6	0	6	0	0	0.00
Tanzania	1	2026	2026	16th place (2026)	4	0	4	0	0	0.00
Defunct teams
ICC Associates	1	1988	1988	8th place (1988)	7	0	7	0	0	0.00
Americas	1	2000	2000	16th place (2000)	6	0	6	0	0	0.00

Note: the win percentage excludes no results and counts ties as half a win.

== Performance by Nations ==
Legend
1st	Champions
2nd	Runners-up
3rd	Third place
Q	Qualified for upcoming tournament
§	Team qualified for tournament, but withdrew
†	Team was ineligible for tournament
	Hosts

Team	(Australia) 1988	(South Africa) 1998	(Sri Lanka) 2000	(New Zealand) 2002	(Bangladesh) 2004	(Sri Lanka) 2006	(Malaysia) 2008	(New Zealand) 2010	(Australia) 2012	(United Arab Emirates) 2014	(Bangladesh) 2016	(New Zealand) 2018	(South Africa) 2020	(Cricket West Indies) 2022	(South Africa) 2024	(Namibia) (Zimbabwe) 2026	Total
Afghanistan	—	—	—	—	—	—	—	16th	10th	7th	9th	4th	7th	4th	13th	4th	9
Australia	1st	4th	4th	1st	10th	3rd	6th	1st	2nd	4th	§	2nd	6th	3rd	1st	3rd	15
Bangladesh	—	9th	10th	11th	9th	5th	8th	9th	7th	9th	3rd	6th	1st	8th	6th	8th	15
Bermuda	—	—	—	—	—	—	15th	—	—	—	—	—	—	—	—	—	1
Canada	—	—	—	15th	15th	—	—	11th	—	15th	15th	12th	13th	16th	—	—	8
Denmark	—	13th	—	—	—	—	—	—	—	—	—	—	—	—	—	—	1
England	4th	1st	6th	7th	4th	4th	5th	8th	5th	3rd	6th	7th	9th	2nd	7th	2nd	16
Fiji	—	—	—	—	—	—	—	—	—	—	16th	—	—	—	—	—	1
Hong Kong	—	—	—	—	—	—	—	14th	—	—	—	—	—	—	—	—	1
India	6th	5th	1st	3rd	3rd	2nd	1st	6th	1st	5th	2nd	1st	2nd	1st	2nd	1st	16
Ireland	—	14th	12th	—	11th	13th	13th	10th	12th	—	13th	13th	—	10th	8th	11th	12
Japan	—	—	—	—	—	—	—	—	—	—	—	—	16th	—	—	14th	2
Kenya	—	11th	13th	14th	—	—	—	—	—	—	—	15th	—	—	—	—	4
Malaysia	—	—	—	—	—	—	16th	—	—	—	—	—	—	—	—	—	1
Namibia	—	15th	15th	12th	—	15th	11th	—	16th	14th	7th	14th	—	—	15th	—	10
Netherlands	—	—	14th	—	—	—	—	—	—	—	—	—	—	—	—	—	1
Nepal	—	—	8th	10th	13th	9th	10th	—	13th	—	8th	—	—	—	11th	—	8
New Zealand	7th	2nd	7th	6th	8th	10th	4th	7th	4th	10th	12th	8th	4th	§	10th	9th	15
Nigeria	—	—	—	—	—	—	—	—	—	—	—	—	15th	—	—	—	1
Pakistan	2nd	7th	3rd	5th	1st	1st	3rd	2nd	8th	2nd	5th	3rd	3rd	5th	3rd	6th	16
Papua New Guinea	—	16th	—	16th	16th	—	12th	12th	14th	16th	—	16th	—	15th	—	—	9
South Africa	†	3rd	9th	2nd	7th	11th	2nd	5th	3rd	1st	11th	5th	8th	7th	4th	10th	15
Scotland	—	12th	—	13th	12th	16th	—	—	11th	13th	14th	—	12th	14th	14th	15th	11
Sri Lanka	5th	6th	2nd	8th	5th	6th	7th	4th	9th	8th	4th	9th	10th	6th	9th	5th	16
Tanzania	—	—	—	—	—	—	—	—	—	—	—	—	—	—	—	16th	1
Uganda	—	—	—	—	14th	14th	—	—	—	—	—	—	—	13th	—	—	3
United Arab Emirates	—	—	—	—	—	—	—	—	—	12th	—	—	14th	9th	—	—	3
United States	—	—	—	—	—	12th	—	15th	—	—	—	—	—	—	16th	13th	3
West Indies	3rd	10th	5th	4th	2nd	8th	9th	3rd	6th	6th	1st	10th	5th	11th	5th	7th	16
Zimbabwe	—	8th	11th	9th	6th	7th	14th	13th	15th	11th	10th	11th	11th	12th	12th	12th	15
Defunct teams
Americas	—	—	16th	—	—	—	—	—	—	—	—	—	—	—	—	—	1
ICC Associates	8th	—	—	—	—	—	—	—	—	—	—	—	—	—	—	—	1
Total	8	16	16	16	16	16	16	16	16	16	16	16	16	16	16	16	

== Debut of teams ==
Team appearing for the first time, in alphabetical order per year.

Year	Debutants	Total
1988	Associates XI, Australia, England, India, New Zealand, Pakistan, Sri Lanka, West Indies	8
1998	Bangladesh, Denmark, Ireland, Kenya, Namibia, Papua New Guinea, South Africa, Scotland, Zimbabwe	9
2000	Americas XI, Nepal, Netherlands	3
2002	Canada	1
2004	Uganda	1
2006	United States	1
2008	Bermuda, Malaysia	2
2010	Afghanistan, Hong Kong	2
2012	—N/a	0
2014	United Arab Emirates	1
2016	Fiji	1
2018	—N/a	0
2020	Japan, Nigeria	2
2022	—N/a	0
2024	—N/a	0
2026	Tanzania	1
Total		31

== Records ==
=== Team records ===
Highest innings totals
Score	Batting team	Opposition	Venue	Date	Scorecard
480/6 (50 overs)	Australia	Kenya	Carisbrook, Dunedin, New Zealand	20 January 2002	Scorecard
436/4 (50 overs)	New Zealand	Kenya	Hagley Oval, Christchurch, New Zealand	17 January 2018	Scorecard
425/3 (50 overs)	India	Scotland	Bangabandhu National Stadium, Dhaka, Bangladesh	16 February 2004	Scorecard
419/4 (50 overs)	Sri Lanka	Kenya	Lincoln Green, Lincoln, New Zealand	23 January 2018	Scorecard
411/9 (50 overs)	India	England	Harare Sports Club, Harare, Zimbabwe	6 February 2026	Scorecard

As of 6 February 2026

Lowest innings totals
Score	Batting team	Opposition	Venue	Date	Scorecard
22 (22.3 overs)	Scotland	Australia	M. A. Aziz Stadium, Chittagong, Bangladesh	22 February 2004	Scorecard
41 (22.5 overs)	Japan	India	Mangaung Oval, Bloemfontein, South Africa	21 January 2020	Scorecard
41 (28.4 overs)	Canada	South Africa	North Harbour Stadium, Auckland, New Zealand	25 January 2002	Scorecard
41 (11.4 overs)	Bangladesh	South Africa	Bayuemas Oval, Kuala Lumpur, Malaysia	24 February 2008	Scorecard
43 (18.3 overs)	Japan	Sri Lanka	NW University Oval, Potchefstroom, South Africa	25 January 2020	Scorecard

As of 27 January 2026

==== Most consecutive wins ====
- 12 – India 2022–2024
- 11 – India 2018–2020
- 9 – Australia 2002–2004; England 2020–2022
- 8 – India 2000–2002, 2008–2010, 2012–2014; Bangladesh 2004–2006; Pakistan 2006–2008; Australia 2010–2012

Source: CricketArchive

==== Most consecutive losses ====
- 21 – Papua New Guinea, 1998–2008
- 18 – Papua New Guinea, 2012–2022
- 11 – Namibia, 2008–2014
- 10 – Canada, 2002–2004
- 9 – Scotland, 2004–2012

=== Individual records ===
==== Batting records ====
As of 6 February 2026

Most career runs
Runs	Innings	Batsman	Team	Career span
606	13	Eoin Morgan	Ireland	2004–2006
585	12	Babar Azam	Pakistan	2010–2012
566	12	Sarfaraz Khan	India	2014–2016
548	12	Finn Allen	New Zealand	2016–2018
548	12	Kraigg Braithwaite	West Indies	2010–2012

Source: ESPNcricinfo

Most runs in a single tournament

- 506 – (South Africa) Dewald Brevis, 2022
- 505 – (India) Shikhar Dhawan, 2004
- 471 – (Australia) Brett Williams, 1988
- 444 – (England) Ben Mayes, 2026
- 439 – (India) Vaibhav Suryavanshi, 2026

Source: ESPNcricinfo

Highest individual scores

- 192 (143 balls) – (Sri Lanka) Viran Chamuditha, vs. Japan, 17 January 2026
- 191 (117 balls) - (England) Ben Mayes, vs. Scotland, 21 January 2026
- 191 (152 balls) – (Sri Lanka) Hasitha Boyagoda, vs. Kenya, 23 January 2018
- 180 (144 balls) – (New Zealand) Jakob Bhula, vs. Kenya, 17 January 2018
- 176 (129 balls) – (Cricket West Indies) Donovan Pagon, vs. Scotland, 21 January 2002

Source: ESPNcricinfo

==== Highest partnerships by wicket ====
Partnership	Runs	Batsmen		Batting team	Opposition	Venue	Date	Scorecard
1st wicket	328	Dimantha Mahavithana	Viran Chamuditha	Sri Lanka	Japan	Namibia Cricket Ground, Windhoek, Namibia	17 January 2026	Scorecard
2nd wicket	303	Daniel Lawrence	Jack Burnham	England	Fiji	M. A. Aziz Stadium, Chittagong, Bangladesh	27 January 2016	Scorecard
3rd wicket	206	Angkrish Raghuvanshi	Raj Bawa	India	Uganda	Brian Lara Stadium, Tarouba, Trinidad	22 January 2022	Scorecard
4th wicket	215	Uday Saharan	Sachin Dhas	India	Nepal	Mangaung Oval, Bloemfontein, South Africa	2 February 2024	Scorecard
5th wicket	171	Uday Saharan	Sachin Dhas	India	South Africa	Willowmoore Park, Benoni, South Africa	6 February 2024	Scorecard
6th wicket	164	Umair Masood	Salman Fayyaz	Pakistan	West Indies	Khan Shaheb Osman Ali Stadium, Fatullah, Bangladesh	8 February 2016	Scorecard
7th wicket	131	Dewan Marais	Juan James	South Africa	West Indies	Senwes Park, Potchefstroom, South Africa	19 January 2024	Scorecard
8th wicket	130*	Emmanuel Bawa	Gareth Chirawu	Zimbabwe	Canada	North West University No 2 Ground, Potchefstroom, South Africa	28 January 2020	Scorecard
9th wicket	136	Nicholas Pooran	Jerome Jones	West Indies	Australia	Dubai International Cricket Stadium, UAE	23 February 2014	Scorecard
10th wicket	73*	Steven Eno	Timothy Mou	Papua New Guinea	Afghanistan	Nelson Park, Napier, New Zealand	24 January 2010	Scorecard
As of 17 January 2026

- An asterisk (*) signifies an unbroken partnership (i.e. neither of the batsmen was dismissed before either the end of the allotted overs or the required score being reached)

==== Bowling records ====
Most career wickets

- 28 – (Zimbabwe) Wesley Madhevere, 2016–2020; (South Africa) Kwena Maphaka, 2022–2024
- 27 – (Australia) Moises Henriques, 2004–2006; (Ireland) Greg Thompson, 2004–2008
- 26 – (India) Abhishek Sharma, 2002–2004

Source: ESPNcricinfo

Most wickets in a single tournament

- 22 – (Bangladesh) Enamul Haque, 2004
- 21 – (South Africa) Kwena Maphaka, 2024
- 19 – (Australia) Wayne Holdsworth, 1988; (Pakistan) Mushtaq Ahmed, 1988; (Pakistan) Riaz Afridi, 2004; (England) Reece Topley, 2012

Source: ESPNcricinfo

Best bowling figures

- 8/35 (9.4 overs) – (Australia) Lloyd Pope, vs. England, 23 January 2018
- 7/15 (6.5 overs) – (Australia) Jason Ralston, vs. Papua New Guinea, 19 January 2018
- 7/19 (9.2 overs) – (Sri Lanka) Jeewan Mendis, vs. Zimbabwe, 24 January 2002
- 7/20 (8.1 overs) – (New Zealand) Trent Boult, vs. Malaysia, 21 February 2008
- 7/29 (7.5 overs) – (England) Tazeem Ali, vs. Zimbabwe, 3 February 2024

Source: ESPNcricinfo

=== By tournament ===
Year	Player of the Final	Player of the tournament	Most runs	Most wickets
1988	(Australia) Brett Williams	Not Awarded	(Australia) Brett Williams (471)	(Australia) Wayne Holdsworth (19) (Pakistan) Mushtaq Ahmed (19)
1998	(England) Stephen Peters	Not Awarded	(Cricket West Indies) Chris Gayle (364)	(Cricket West Indies) Ramnaresh Sarwan (16) (Zimbabwe) Mluleki Nkala (16)
2000	(India) Reetinder Sodhi	(India) Yuvraj Singh	(South Africa) Graeme Smith (348)	(Pakistan) Zahid Saeed (15)
2002	(Australia) Aaron Bird	(Zimbabwe) Tatenda Taibu	(Australia) Cameron White (423)	(Australia) Xavier Doherty (16) (Zimbabwe) Waddington Mwayenga (16)
2004	(Pakistan) Asif Iqbal	(India) Shikhar Dhawan	(India) Shikhar Dhawan (505)	(Bangladesh) Enamul Haque (22)
2006	(Pakistan) Anwar Ali	(India) Cheteshwar Pujara	(India) Cheteshwar Pujara (349)	(Australia) Moises Henriques (16)
2008	(India) Ajitesh Argal	(New Zealand) Tim Southee	(India) Tanmay Srivastava (262)	(South Africa) Wayne Parnell (18)
2010	(Australia) Josh Hazlewood	(South Africa) Dominic Hendricks	(South Africa) Dominic Hendricks (391)	(Papua New Guinea) Raymond Haoda (15)
2012	(India) Unmukt Chand	(Australia) Will Bosisto	(Bangladesh) Anamul Haque (365)	(England) Reece Topley (19)
2014	(South Africa) Corbin Bosch	(South Africa) Aiden Markram	(Bangladesh) Shadman Islam (406)	(Sri Lanka) Anuk Fernando (15)
2016	(Cricket West Indies) Keacy Carty	(Bangladesh) Mehedi Hasan	(England) Jack Burnham (420)	(Namibia) Fritz Coetzee (15)
2018	(India) Manjot Kalra	(India) Shubman Gill	(Cricket West Indies) Alick Athanaze (418)	(India) Anukul Roy (14) (Afghanistan) Qais Ahmad (14) (Canada) Faisal Jamkhandi (14)
2020	(Bangladesh) Akbar Ali	(India) Yashasvi Jaiswal	(India) Yashasvi Jaiswal (400)	(India) Ravi Bishnoi (17)
2022	(India) Raj Bawa	(South Africa) Dewald Brevis	(South Africa) Dewald Brevis (506)	(Sri Lanka) Dunith Wellalage (17)
2024	(Australia) Mahli Beardman	(South Africa) Kwena Maphaka	(India) Uday Saharan (397)	(South Africa) Kwena Maphaka (21)
2026	(India) Vaibhav Sooryavanshi		(England) Ben Mayes (444)	(England) Manny Lumsden (16)
