= West Indies under-19 cricket team =

West Indies
- One Day name: West Indies Under-19s

Personnel
- Captain: Stephan Pascal
- Coach: Rohan Nurse
- Bowling coach: Curtly Ambrose
- Owner: Cricket West Indies
- Manager: Dwain Gill

Team information
- Founded: 1974

History
- First-class debut: England in 1970; 56 years ago at Lichfield Road, Stone
- ICC Under-19 Cricket World Cup wins: (gold) 1 (2016)

International Cricket Council
- ICC region: America
Test kit
ODI kit
T20I kit
- As of 18 December 2023

The West Indies under-19 cricket team represents the countries of Cricket West Indies in international under-19 cricket. The West Indies is one of only five teams to have participated in every edition of the Under-19 Cricket World Cup, along with England, India, Pakistan and Sri Lanka.

The Windies U19 got to the final of the 2004 World Cup held in Bangladesh, where they were runners-up to Pakistan. The Caribbean side eventually won the tournament for the first time in 2016, defeating India in the final, again held in Bangladesh.

== Tournament history ==
A red box around the year indicates tournaments played within West Indies

Key
Champions
Runners-up
Semi-finals

=== Under-19 World Cup record ===
West Indies U19 World Cup record
Year	Result	Pos	№	Pld	W	L	T	NR
(Australia) 1988	Semi-finals	3rd	8	8	5	3	0	0
(South Africa) 1998	First round	10th	16	7	5	2	0	0
(Sri Lanka) 2000	Second round	5th	16	6	4	2	0	0
(New Zealand) 2002	Semi-finals	4th	16	7	4	3	0	0
(Bangladesh) 2004	Runner-up	2nd	16	8	5	3	0	0
(Sri Lanka) 2006	Second round	8th	16	5	2	3	0	0
(Malaysia) 2008	First round	9th	16	6	4	2	0	0
(New Zealand) 2010	Semi-finals	3rd	16	6	4	2	0	0
(Australia) 2012	Quarter-finals	6th	16	6	4	2	0	0
(United Arab Emirates) 2014	Quarter-finals	6th	16	6	3	3	0	0
(Bangladesh) 2016	Champion	1st	16	6	5	1	0	0
(New Zealand) 2018	First round	10th	16	6	3	3	0	0
(South Africa) 2020	Quarter-finals	5th	16	6	4	1	0	1
(Cricket West Indies) 2022	First round	11th	16	6	3	3	0	0
(South Africa) 2024	Second round	5th	16	5	3	1	0	1
(Zimbabwe) (Namibia) 2026	Second round	7th	16	5	3	2	0	0
Total				87	58	29	0	2

== Coaching staff ==
- Team Manager: Reon Griffith
- Head coach: Floyd Reifer
- Assistant coach: Reon Griffith
- Bowling Coach: Curtly Ambrose
- Physiotherapist: Kevin Williams
- Strength and conditioning Coach: Gregory Seale
- Team Analyst: Dinesh Mahabir
