= 2015 T20 Blast =

2015 NatWest t20 Blast
- Dates: 15 May 2015 – 29 August 2015
- Administrator: England and Wales Cricket Board
- Cricket format: Twenty20
- Tournament format(s): Group stage and knockout
- Champions: Lancashire Lightning (1st title)
- Participants: 18
- Matches: 133
- Attendance: 827,654 (6,223 per match)
- Most runs: James Vince, Hampshire (710)
- Most wickets: James Faulkner, Lancashire Lightning (25)
- Official website: NatWest T20 Blast

The 2015 NatWest T20 Blast was the thirteenth edition of the T20 Blast, the English and Welsh Twenty20 cricket competition. The competition ran from 15 May 2015 to Finals Day at Edgbaston on 29 August. The competition was won for the first time by Lancashire Lightning, who defeated Northamptonshire Steelbacks in the final.

== Format ==
The 18 teams are divided into two groups of nine. In the style of a round-robin tournament, each team will play six other teams in their group both home and away. The other two teams will be faced just once. The top four teams from each group qualify for the knockout stage: a three-round single-elimination tournament. The winner of each group will have a home match in the quarter-finals against the fourth team from the other group. The runners-up from each group will play at home against the third placed team from the other group. The semi-finals will be a free draw from all the qualified teams. Finals Day will be again be held at Edgbaston.

== North Division ==
=== Table ===
Pos	Team	Pld	W	L	T	NR	Ded	Pts	NRR
1	Birmingham Bears	14	10	4	0	0	0	20	0.200
2	Worcestershire Rapids	14	9	4	0	1	0	19	0.682
3	Northamptonshire Steelbacks	14	7	5	0	2	0	16	0.115
4	Lancashire Lightning	14	7	6	0	1	0	15	0.469
5	Nottinghamshire Outlaws	14	7	6	0	1	0	15	0.018
6	Durham Jets	14	5	8	0	1	0	11	−0.149
7	Leicestershire Foxes	14	4	7	1	2	0	11	−0.304
8	Yorkshire Vikings	14	5	8	1	0	0	11	−0.324
9	Derbyshire Falcons	14	4	10	0	0	0	8	−0.662

=== Results ===
	Birmingham Bears	Derbyshire Falcons	Durham Jets	Lancashire Lightning	Leicestershire Foxes	Northamptonshire Steelbacks	Nottinghamshire Outlaws	Worcestershire Rapids	Yorkshire Vikings
Birmingham Bears		Birmingham Bears; 60 runs		Lancashire Lightning; 8 runs	Leicestershire Foxes; 7 wickets	Birmingham Bears; 1 run	Birmingham Bears; 7 wickets	Birmingham Bears; 18 runs	Birmingham Bears; 6 wickets
Derbyshire Falcons			Durham Jets; 5 runs	Derbyshire Falcons; 5 wickets	Derbyshire Falcons; 17 runs	Northamptonshire; 3 runs (D/L)	Derbyshire Falcons; 34 runs	Worcestershire Rapids; 4 wickets	Derbyshire Falcons; 4 wickets
Durham Jets	Birmingham Bears; 7 wickets			Lancashire Lightning; 6 wickets	Durham Jets; 38 runs	Durham Jets; 41 runs (D/L)	Nottinghamshire Outlaws; 42 runs	Worcestershire Rapids; 3 runs	Durham Jets; 6 runs
Lancashire Lightning	Birmingham Bears; 1 run	Lancashire Lightning; 67 runs	Durham Jets; 16 runs		Lancashire Lightning; 5 wickets (D/L)		Nottinghamshire Outlaws; 3 wickets	Worcestershire Rapids; 2 wickets	Lancashire Lightning; 29 runs
Leicestershire Foxes	Birmingham Bears; 8 runs	Leicestershire Foxes; 7 wickets	Leicestershire Foxes; 8 wickets	Lancashire Lightning; 40 runs		Abandoned; No result	Abandoned; No result		Match tied
Northamptonshire Steelbacks	Birmingham Bears; 5 wickets	Northamptonshire Steelbacks; 6 wickets	Abandoned; No result	Northamptonshire Steelbacks; 4 runs	Northamptonshire Steelbacks; 9 wickets (D/L)			Worcestershire Rapids; 14 runs	Northamptonshire Steelbacks; 6 wickets
Nottinghamshire Outlaws	Nottinghamshire Outlaws; 8 wickets (D/L)	Nottinghamshire Outlaws; 2 runs	Nottinghamshire Outlaws; 15 runs		Leicestershire Foxes; 6 wickets	Nottinghamshire Outlaws; 7 wickets		Worcestershire Rapids; 20 runs	Yorkshire Vikings; 6 wickets
Worcestershire Rapids	Birmingham Bears; 5 wickets	Worcestershire Rapids; 8 wickets	Worcestershire Rapids; 5 wickets	Abandoned; No result	Worcestershire Rapids; 6 wickets	Northamptonshire Steelbacks; 2 runs	Nottinghamshire Outlaws; 11 runs		
Yorkshire Vikings	Yorkshire Vikings; 8 wickets	Yorkshire Vikings; 7 wickets	Yorkshire Vikings; 5 wickets	Lancashire Lightning; 4 wickets		Northamptonshire Steelbacks; 8 wickets (D/L)	Yorkshire Vikings; 40 runs	Worcestershire Rapids; 74 runs	

Home team win	Away team win	Match tied	Match abandoned

=== Fixtures ===
All times are BST.

==== May ====
15 May	Durham Jets (H); 174/8 (20 overs)	v	Northamptonshire Steelbacks; 47/5 (8 overs)	Durham Jets won by 41 runs (D/L method)
17:30; Scorecard	Durham Jets (H); 174/8 (20 overs)	v	Northamptonshire Steelbacks; 47/5 (8 overs)	Riverside Ground, Chester-le-Street; Umpires: Peter Hartley and Richard Kettleborough; Player of the match: Calum MacLeod (Durham Jets)
17:30; Scorecard	Calum MacLeod 60 (32); Shahid Afridi and David Willey 2/28 (4 overs)		Richard Levi 26 (18); Chris Rushworth 2/13 (2 overs)	Riverside Ground, Chester-le-Street; Umpires: Peter Hartley and Richard Kettleborough; Player of the match: Calum MacLeod (Durham Jets)
Northamptonshire Steelbacks won the toss and elected to field; Northamptonshire Steelback's innings was reduced to 8 overs due to rain				Riverside Ground, Chester-le-Street; Umpires: Peter Hartley and Richard Kettleborough; Player of the match: Calum MacLeod (Durham Jets)

15 May	Leicestershire Foxes; 131/7 (15 overs)	v	Lancashire Lightning (H); 142/5 (15 overs)	Lancashire Lightning won by 5 wickets (D/L method)
18:30 (D/N); Scorecard	Leicestershire Foxes; 131/7 (15 overs)	v	Lancashire Lightning (H); 142/5 (15 overs)	Old Trafford, Manchester; Umpires: Paul Baldwin and Tim Robinson; Player of the match: Steven Croft (Lancashire Lightning)
18:30 (D/N); Scorecard	Kevin O'Brien 47 (27); George Edwards 4/20 (3 overs)		Steven Croft 70* (39); Clint McKay and Jigar Naik 1/24 (3 overs)	Old Trafford, Manchester; Umpires: Paul Baldwin and Tim Robinson; Player of the match: Steven Croft (Lancashire Lightning)
Leicestershire Foxes won the toss and elected to bat; Both innings were reduced to 15 overs due to rain; Tom Bailey and Liam Livingstone (both Lancashire Lightning) made their T20 debut				Old Trafford, Manchester; Umpires: Paul Baldwin and Tim Robinson; Player of the match: Steven Croft (Lancashire Lightning)

15 May	Birmingham Bears; 141/7 (20 overs)	v	Nottinghamshire Outlaws (H); 142/2 (14.3 overs)	Nottinghamshire Outlaws won by 8 wickets
18:30 (D/N); Scorecard	Birmingham Bears; 141/7 (20 overs)	v	Nottinghamshire Outlaws (H); 142/2 (14.3 overs)	Trent Bridge, Nottingham; Umpires: Martin Bodenham and Michael Gough; Player of the match: Alex Hales (Nottinghamshire Outlaws)
18:30 (D/N); Scorecard	Varun Chopra 80 (61); Luke Fletcher 3/24 (4 overs)		Alex Hales 86* (43); Rikki Clarke 1/18 (3 overs)	Trent Bridge, Nottingham; Umpires: Martin Bodenham and Michael Gough; Player of the match: Alex Hales (Nottinghamshire Outlaws)
Nottinghamshire Outlaws won the toss and elected to field; Tom Lewis (Birmingham Bears) made his T20 debut				Trent Bridge, Nottingham; Umpires: Martin Bodenham and Michael Gough; Player of the match: Alex Hales (Nottinghamshire Outlaws)

15 May	Derbyshire Falcons; 128 (18.2 overs)	v	Yorkshire Vikings (H); 131/3 (16.4 overs)	Yorkshire Vikings won by 7 wickets
19:00 (D/N); Scorecard	Derbyshire Falcons; 128 (18.2 overs)	v	Yorkshire Vikings (H); 131/3 (16.4 overs)	Headingley, Leeds; Umpires: Russell Evans and Graham Lloyd; Player of the match: Matthew Fisher (Yorkshire Vikings)
19:00 (D/N); Scorecard	Hashim Amla 29 (22); Matthew Fisher 5/22 (3.2 overs)		Andrew Gale 41 (36); Ben Cotton 2/19 (4 overs)	Headingley, Leeds; Umpires: Russell Evans and Graham Lloyd; Player of the match: Matthew Fisher (Yorkshire Vikings)
Yorkshire Vikings won the toss and elected to field; Matthew Fisher (Yorkshire Vikings) made his T20 debut				Headingley, Leeds; Umpires: Russell Evans and Graham Lloyd; Player of the match: Matthew Fisher (Yorkshire Vikings)

22 May	Derbyshire Falcons; 163/6 (20 overs)	v	Leicestershire Foxes (H); 164/3 (19 overs)	Leicestershire Foxes won by 7 wickets
17:30; Scorecard	Derbyshire Falcons; 163/6 (20 overs)	v	Leicestershire Foxes (H); 164/3 (19 overs)	Grace Road, Leicester; Umpires: Nick Cook and Russell Evans; Player of the match: Niall O'Brien (Leicestershire Foxes)
17:30; Scorecard	Chesney Hughes 59 (44); Jigar Naik 3/23 (4 overs)		Niall O'Brien 47* (27); David Wainwright 1/25 (4 overs)	Grace Road, Leicester; Umpires: Nick Cook and Russell Evans; Player of the match: Niall O'Brien (Leicestershire Foxes)
Leicestershire Foxes won the toss and elected to field				Grace Road, Leicester; Umpires: Nick Cook and Russell Evans; Player of the match: Niall O'Brien (Leicestershire Foxes)

22 May	Durham Jets; 155 (19.4 overs)	v	Lancashire Lightning (H); 139/9 (20 overs)	Durham Jets won by 16 runs
18:30 (D/N); Scorecard	Durham Jets; 155 (19.4 overs)	v	Lancashire Lightning (H); 139/9 (20 overs)	Old Trafford, Manchester; Umpires: Jeff Evans and Neil Mallender; Player of the match: Ashwell Prince (Lancashire Lightning)
18:30 (D/N); Scorecard	Mark Stoneman 57 (38); Arron Lilley 2/18 (4 overs)		Ashwell Prince 78 (51); Usman Arshad 2/9 (2 overs)	Old Trafford, Manchester; Umpires: Jeff Evans and Neil Mallender; Player of the match: Ashwell Prince (Lancashire Lightning)
Durham Jets won the toss and elected to bat				Old Trafford, Manchester; Umpires: Jeff Evans and Neil Mallender; Player of the match: Ashwell Prince (Lancashire Lightning)

22 May	Nottinghamshire Outlaws (H); 143/7 (20 overs)	v	Yorkshire Vikings; 146/4 (18.5 overs)	Yorkshire Vikings won by 6 wickets
18:30 (D/N); Scorecard	Nottinghamshire Outlaws (H); 143/7 (20 overs)	v	Yorkshire Vikings; 146/4 (18.5 overs)	Trent Bridge, Nottingham; Umpires: Paul Baldwin and Steve Garratt; Player of the match: Andrew Gale (Yorkshire Vikings)
18:30 (D/N); Scorecard	Samit Patel 41 (27); Liam Plunkett 2/18 (4 overs)		Andrew Gale 68* (55); Steven Mullaney 2/27 (4 overs)	Trent Bridge, Nottingham; Umpires: Paul Baldwin and Steve Garratt; Player of the match: Andrew Gale (Yorkshire Vikings)
Yorkshire Vikings won the toss and elected to field				Trent Bridge, Nottingham; Umpires: Paul Baldwin and Steve Garratt; Player of the match: Andrew Gale (Yorkshire Vikings)

22 May	Birmingham Bears (H); 144/5 (20 overs)	v	Worcestershire Rapids; 126 (19.3 overs)	Birmingham Bears won by 18 runs
18:30 (D/N); Scorecard	Birmingham Bears (H); 144/5 (20 overs)	v	Worcestershire Rapids; 126 (19.3 overs)	Edgbaston, Birmingham; Umpires: Martin Bodenham and Alex Wharf; Player of the match: Ateeq Javid (Birmingham Bears)
18:30 (D/N); Scorecard	William Porterfield 27 (21); Brett D'Oliveira 2/21 (4 overs)		Daryl Mitchell 34 (31); Recordo Gordon 3/18 (3.3 overs)	Edgbaston, Birmingham; Umpires: Martin Bodenham and Alex Wharf; Player of the match: Ateeq Javid (Birmingham Bears)
Worcestershire Rapids won the toss and elected to field; Ed Barnard (Worcestershire Rapids) made his T20 debut				Edgbaston, Birmingham; Umpires: Martin Bodenham and Alex Wharf; Player of the match: Ateeq Javid (Birmingham Bears)

28 May	Durham Jets; 123/5 (20 overs)	v	Leicestershire Foxes (H); 124/2 (15.3 overs)	Leicestershire Foxes won by 8 wickets
17:30; Scorecard	Durham Jets; 123/5 (20 overs)	v	Leicestershire Foxes (H); 124/2 (15.3 overs)	Grace Road, Leicester; Umpires: Jeremy Lloyds and Tim Robinson; Player of the match: Kevin O'Brien (Leicestershire Foxes)
17:30; Scorecard	Phil Mustard 45 (43); Kevin O'Brien 2/20 (3 overs)		Kevin O'Brien 48 (34); Scott Borthwick 1/29 (3 overs)	Grace Road, Leicester; Umpires: Jeremy Lloyds and Tim Robinson; Player of the match: Kevin O'Brien (Leicestershire Foxes)
Durham Jets won the toss and elected to bat; Neil Pinner (Leicestershire Foxes) made his T20 debut				Grace Road, Leicester; Umpires: Jeremy Lloyds and Tim Robinson; Player of the match: Kevin O'Brien (Leicestershire Foxes)

29 May	Leicestershire Foxes; 147/6 (20 overs)	v	Worcestershire Rapids (H); 149/4 (17.4 overs)	Worcestershire Rapids won by 6 wickets
17:30; Scorecard	Leicestershire Foxes; 147/6 (20 overs)	v	Worcestershire Rapids (H); 149/4 (17.4 overs)	County Ground, Worcester; Umpires: Paul Baldwin and Richard Illingworth; Player of the match: Daryl Mitchell (Worcestershire Rapids)
17:30; Scorecard	Grant Elliott 33 (32); Ed Barnard 2/18 (3 overs)		Daryl Mitchell 58* (47); Rob Taylor 2/32 (3 overs)	County Ground, Worcester; Umpires: Paul Baldwin and Richard Illingworth; Player of the match: Daryl Mitchell (Worcestershire Rapids)
Worcestershire Rapids won the toss and elected to field				County Ground, Worcester; Umpires: Paul Baldwin and Richard Illingworth; Player of the match: Daryl Mitchell (Worcestershire Rapids)

29 May	Northamptonshire Steelbacks (H); 146/7 (20 overs)	v	Birmingham Bears; 150/5 (20 overs)	Birmingham Bears won by 5 wickets
18:30 (D/N); Scorecard	Northamptonshire Steelbacks (H); 146/7 (20 overs)	v	Birmingham Bears; 150/5 (20 overs)	County Ground, Northampton; Umpires: Russell Evans and Martin Saggers; Player of the match: William Porterfield (Birmingham Bears)
18:30 (D/N); Scorecard	Richard Levi 58 (48); Oliver Hannon-Dalby 2/35 (4 overs)		William Porterfield 55 (54); Azharullah 3/30 (4 overs)	County Ground, Northampton; Umpires: Russell Evans and Martin Saggers; Player of the match: William Porterfield (Birmingham Bears)
Northamptonshire Steelbacks won the toss and elected to bat				County Ground, Northampton; Umpires: Russell Evans and Martin Saggers; Player of the match: William Porterfield (Birmingham Bears)

29 May	Lancashire Lightning; 127/9 (20 overs)	v	Derbyshire Falcons (H); 128/5 (17.4 overs)	Derbyshire Falcons won by 5 wickets
19:00 (D/N); Scorecard	Lancashire Lightning; 127/9 (20 overs)	v	Derbyshire Falcons (H); 128/5 (17.4 overs)	County Ground, Derby; Umpires: Neil Bainton and Peter Hartley; Player of the match: Wayne White (Derbyshire Falcons)
19:00 (D/N); Scorecard	Alex Davies 41 (26); Wayne White 3/21 (4 overs)		Hashim Amla 51 (37); Jordan Clark 2/30 (4 overs)	County Ground, Derby; Umpires: Neil Bainton and Peter Hartley; Player of the match: Wayne White (Derbyshire Falcons)
Derbyshire Falcons won the toss and elected to field				County Ground, Derby; Umpires: Neil Bainton and Peter Hartley; Player of the match: Wayne White (Derbyshire Falcons)

29 May	Durham Jets (H); 182/4 (20 overs)	v	Yorkshire Vikings; 176/8 (20 overs)	Durham Jets won by 6 runs
19:00 (D/N); Scorecard	Durham Jets (H); 182/4 (20 overs)	v	Yorkshire Vikings; 176/8 (20 overs)	Riverside Ground, Chester-le-Street; Umpires: Nick Cook and Graham Lloyd; Player of the match: John Hastings (Durham Jets)
19:00 (D/N); Scorecard	Phil Mustard 39 (34); Liam Plunkett 2/29 (4 overs)		Andrew Gale 41* (34); Keaton Jennings 4/37 (4 overs)	Riverside Ground, Chester-le-Street; Umpires: Nick Cook and Graham Lloyd; Player of the match: John Hastings (Durham Jets)
Yorkshire Vikings won the toss and elected to field				Riverside Ground, Chester-le-Street; Umpires: Nick Cook and Graham Lloyd; Player of the match: John Hastings (Durham Jets)

31 May	Nottinghamshire Outlaws (H); 175/7 (20 overs)	v	Durham Jets; 160/6 (20 overs)	Nottinghamshire Outlaws won by 15 runs
14:30; Scorecard	Nottinghamshire Outlaws (H); 175/7 (20 overs)	v	Durham Jets; 160/6 (20 overs)	Trent Bridge, Nottingham; Umpires: Rob Bailey and Neil Bainton; Player of the match: Riki Wessels (Nottinghamshire Outlaws)
14:30; Scorecard	Riki Wessels 67 (41); Usman Arshad 2/19 (4 overs)		Gordon Muchall 42* (35); Luke Fletcher 2/29 (3 overs)	Trent Bridge, Nottingham; Umpires: Rob Bailey and Neil Bainton; Player of the match: Riki Wessels (Nottinghamshire Outlaws)
Durham Jets won the toss and elected to field				Trent Bridge, Nottingham; Umpires: Rob Bailey and Neil Bainton; Player of the match: Riki Wessels (Nottinghamshire Outlaws)

==== June ====
5 June	Worcestershire Rapids; 211/3 (20 overs)	v	Northamptonshire Steelbacks (H); 197/7 (20 overs)	Worcestershire Rapids won by 14 runs
18:30 (D/N); Scorecard	Worcestershire Rapids; 211/3 (20 overs)	v	Northamptonshire Steelbacks (H); 197/7 (20 overs)	County Ground, Northampton; Umpires: Nick Cook and Graham Lloyd; Player of the match: Moeen Ali (Worcestershire Rapids)
18:30 (D/N); Scorecard	Moeen Ali 90 (50); David Willey 1/32 (4 overs)		Josh Cobb 80 (44); Saeed Ajmal 3/53 (4 overs)	County Ground, Northampton; Umpires: Nick Cook and Graham Lloyd; Player of the match: Moeen Ali (Worcestershire Rapids)
Worcestershire Rapids won the toss and elected to bat				County Ground, Northampton; Umpires: Nick Cook and Graham Lloyd; Player of the match: Moeen Ali (Worcestershire Rapids)

5 June	Nottinghamshire Outlaws (H); 148/7 (20 overs)	v	Leicestershire Foxes; 152/4 (18.5 overs)	Leicestershire Foxes won by 6 wickets
18:30 (D/N); Scorecard	Nottinghamshire Outlaws (H); 148/7 (20 overs)	v	Leicestershire Foxes; 152/4 (18.5 overs)	Trent Bridge, Nottingham; Umpires: Paul Baldwin and Peter Hartley; Player of the match: Umar Akmal (Leicestershire Foxes)
18:30 (D/N); Scorecard	Alex Hales 54 (42); Clint McKay 4/24 (4 overs)		Umar Akmal 76 (49); Jake Ball 3/42 (4 overs)	Trent Bridge, Nottingham; Umpires: Paul Baldwin and Peter Hartley; Player of the match: Umar Akmal (Leicestershire Foxes)
Leicestershire Foxes won the toss and elected to field				Trent Bridge, Nottingham; Umpires: Paul Baldwin and Peter Hartley; Player of the match: Umar Akmal (Leicestershire Foxes)

5 June	Yorkshire Vikings (H); 185/8 (20 overs)	v	Lancashire Lightning; 186/6 (20 overs)	Lancashire Lightning won by 4 wickets
18:30 (D/N); Scorecard	Yorkshire Vikings (H); 185/8 (20 overs)	v	Lancashire Lightning; 186/6 (20 overs)	Headingley, Leeds; Umpires: Rob Bailey and Neil Mallender; Player of the match: Jos Buttler (Lancashire Lightning)
18:30 (D/N); Scorecard	Joe Root 55 (39); James Faulkner 3/27 (4 overs)		Jos Buttler 71 (35); Glenn Maxwell 3/15 (3 overs)	Headingley, Leeds; Umpires: Rob Bailey and Neil Mallender; Player of the match: Jos Buttler (Lancashire Lightning)
Lancashire Lightning won the toss and elected to field				Headingley, Leeds; Umpires: Rob Bailey and Neil Mallender; Player of the match: Jos Buttler (Lancashire Lightning)

5 June	Durham Jets; 147/7 (20 overs)	v	Derbyshire Falcons (H); 142/9 (20 overs)	Durham Jets won by 5 runs
18:30 (D/N); Scorecard	Durham Jets; 147/7 (20 overs)	v	Derbyshire Falcons (H); 142/9 (20 overs)	County Ground, Derby; Umpires: Russell Evans and Alex Wharf; Player of the match: Paul Collingwood (Durham Jets)
18:30 (D/N); Scorecard	Paul Collingwood 41 (31); Tillakaratne Dilshan 2/28 (4 overs)		Tillakaratne Dilshan 54 (49); John Hastings 3/29 (4 overs)	County Ground, Derby; Umpires: Russell Evans and Alex Wharf; Player of the match: Paul Collingwood (Durham Jets)
Derbyshire Falcons won the toss and elected to field; Graham Clark (Durham Jets) made his T20 debut				County Ground, Derby; Umpires: Russell Evans and Alex Wharf; Player of the match: Paul Collingwood (Durham Jets)

6 June	Durham Jets (H); 163/7 (20 overs)	v	Birmingham Bears; 164/3 (19.1 overs)	Birmingham Bears won by 7 wickets
14:30; Scorecard	Durham Jets (H); 163/7 (20 overs)	v	Birmingham Bears; 164/3 (19.1 overs)	Riverside Ground, Chester-le-Street; Umpires: Stephen Gale and Michael Gough; Player of the match: Ian Bell (Birmingham Bears)
14:30; Scorecard	Calum MacLeod 41 (27); Ateeq Javid 2/29 (4 overs)		Ian Bell 90 (65); John Hastings 1/19 (4 overs)	Riverside Ground, Chester-le-Street; Umpires: Stephen Gale and Michael Gough; Player of the match: Ian Bell (Birmingham Bears)
Birmingham Bears won the toss and elected to field				Riverside Ground, Chester-le-Street; Umpires: Stephen Gale and Michael Gough; Player of the match: Ian Bell (Birmingham Bears)

7 June	Nottinghamshire Outlaws; 169/5 (20 overs)	v	Worcestershire Rapids (H); 158 (19.2 overs)	Nottinghamshire Outlaws won by 11 runs
14:30; Scorecard	Nottinghamshire Outlaws; 169/5 (20 overs)	v	Worcestershire Rapids (H); 158 (19.2 overs)	County Ground, Worcester; Umpires: Alex Wharf and Paul Baldwin; Player of the match: Samit Patel (Nottinghamshire Outlaws)
14:30; Scorecard	Darren Sammy 36 (16); Jack Shantry 2/54 (4 overs)		Moeen Ali 36 (29); Samit Patel 3/17 (4 overs)	County Ground, Worcester; Umpires: Alex Wharf and Paul Baldwin; Player of the match: Samit Patel (Nottinghamshire Outlaws)
Worcestershire Rapids won the toss and elected to field				County Ground, Worcester; Umpires: Alex Wharf and Paul Baldwin; Player of the match: Samit Patel (Nottinghamshire Outlaws)

11 June	Derbyshire Falcons; 166/7 (20 overs)	v	Northamptonshire Steelbacks (H); 167/4 (17.5 overs)	Northamptonshire Steelbacks won by 6 wickets
18:30 (D/N); Scorecard	Derbyshire Falcons; 166/7 (20 overs)	v	Northamptonshire Steelbacks (H); 167/4 (17.5 overs)	County Ground, Northampton; Umpires: Rob Bailey and Jeremy Lloyds; Player of the match: David Willey (Northamptonshire Steelbacks)
18:30 (D/N); Scorecard	Wes Durston 77 (63); Steven Crook 2/23 (3 overs)		David Willey 60 (27); Shiv Thakor 2/20 (2 overs)	County Ground, Northampton; Umpires: Rob Bailey and Jeremy Lloyds; Player of the match: David Willey (Northamptonshire Steelbacks)
Derbyshire Falcons won the toss and elected to bat				County Ground, Northampton; Umpires: Rob Bailey and Jeremy Lloyds; Player of the match: David Willey (Northamptonshire Steelbacks)

12 June	Northamptonshire Steelbacks; 98/3 (11 overs)	v	Leicestershire Foxes (H); 25/2 (3.1 overs)	No result
17:30; Scorecard	Northamptonshire Steelbacks; 98/3 (11 overs)	v	Leicestershire Foxes (H); 25/2 (3.1 overs)	Grace Road, Leicester; Umpires: Nick Cook and Jeff Evans
17:30; Scorecard	Ben Duckett 39* (23); Atif Sheikh 2/13 (3 overs)		Kevin O'Brien 12 (7); Azharullah 1/0 (0.1 overs)	Grace Road, Leicester; Umpires: Nick Cook and Jeff Evans
Leicestershire Foxes won the toss and elected to field				Grace Road, Leicester; Umpires: Nick Cook and Jeff Evans

12 June	Nottinghamshire Outlaws; 149/9 (20 overs)	v	Birmingham Bears (H); 101/3 (10.2 overs)	Birmingham Bears won by 7 wickets (D/L method)
18:30 (D/N); Scorecard	Nottinghamshire Outlaws; 149/9 (20 overs)	v	Birmingham Bears (H); 101/3 (10.2 overs)	Edgbaston, Birmingham; Umpires: Martin Saggers and Mike Burns; Player of the match: William Porterfield (Birmingham Bears)
18:30 (D/N); Scorecard	Riki Wessels 39 (19); Oliver Hannon-Dalby 4/29 (4 overs)		Ian Bell 38 (24); Jake Ball 2/14 (2 overs)	Edgbaston, Birmingham; Umpires: Martin Saggers and Mike Burns; Player of the match: William Porterfield (Birmingham Bears)
Birmingham Bears won the toss and elected to field				Edgbaston, Birmingham; Umpires: Martin Saggers and Mike Burns; Player of the match: William Porterfield (Birmingham Bears)

12 June	Lancashire Lightning (H); 201/3 (20 overs)	v	Derbyshire Falcons; 134 (18.2 overs)	Lancashire Lightning won by 67 runs
18:30 (D/N); Scorecard	Lancashire Lightning (H); 201/3 (20 overs)	v	Derbyshire Falcons; 134 (18.2 overs)	Old Trafford, Manchester; Umpires: Steve O'Shaughnessy and Russell Evans; Player of the match: Steven Croft (Lancashire Lightning)
18:30 (D/N); Scorecard	Steven Croft 94* (51); Wes Durston 1/25 (4 overs)		Chesney Hughes 39 (32); Stephen Parry 4/16 (3 overs)	Old Trafford, Manchester; Umpires: Steve O'Shaughnessy and Russell Evans; Player of the match: Steven Croft (Lancashire Lightning)
Derbyshire Falcons won the toss and elected to field; Saqib Mahmood (Lancashire Lightning) made his T20 debut				Old Trafford, Manchester; Umpires: Steve O'Shaughnessy and Russell Evans; Player of the match: Steven Croft (Lancashire Lightning)

12 June	Worcestershire Rapids; 159/5 (20 overs)	v	Durham Jets (H); 156/7 (20 overs)	Worcestershire Rapids won by 3 runs
19:00 (D/N); Scorecard	Worcestershire Rapids; 159/5 (20 overs)	v	Durham Jets (H); 156/7 (20 overs)	Riverside Ground, Chester-le-Street; Umpires: Paul Baldwin and Peter Hartley; Player of the match: Daryl Mitchell (Worcestershire Rapids)
19:00 (D/N); Scorecard	Daryl Mitchell 56 (49); Usman Arshad 2/20 (3 overs)		Phil Mustard 43 (40); Saeed Ajmal 3/16 (4 overs)	Riverside Ground, Chester-le-Street; Umpires: Paul Baldwin and Peter Hartley; Player of the match: Daryl Mitchell (Worcestershire Rapids)
Worcestershire Rapids won the toss and elected to bat				Riverside Ground, Chester-le-Street; Umpires: Paul Baldwin and Peter Hartley; Player of the match: Daryl Mitchell (Worcestershire Rapids)

14 June	Yorkshire Vikings (H); 82/7 (12 overs)	v	Northamptonshire Steelbacks; 85/2 (7.4 overs)	Northamptonshire Steelbacks won by 8 wickets (D/L method)
14:30; Scorecard	Yorkshire Vikings (H); 82/7 (12 overs)	v	Northamptonshire Steelbacks; 85/2 (7.4 overs)	Headingley, Leeds; Umpires: Russell Evans and Peter Hartley; Player of the match: Shahid Afridi (Northamptonshire Steelbacks)
14:30; Scorecard	Jonny Bairstow 23 (16); Shahid Afridi 3/15 (3 overs)		Richard Levi 35 (21); Tim Bresnan 1/8 (1 overs)	Headingley, Leeds; Umpires: Russell Evans and Peter Hartley; Player of the match: Shahid Afridi (Northamptonshire Steelbacks)
Northamptonshire Steelbacks won the toss and elected to field				Headingley, Leeds; Umpires: Russell Evans and Peter Hartley; Player of the match: Shahid Afridi (Northamptonshire Steelbacks)

18 June	Lancashire Lightning (H); 163/5 (20 overs)	v	Worcestershire Rapids; 164/8 (19.5 overs)	Worcestershire Rapids won by 2 wickets
18:30 (D/N); Scorecard	Lancashire Lightning (H); 163/5 (20 overs)	v	Worcestershire Rapids; 164/8 (19.5 overs)	Old Trafford, Manchester; Umpires: Stephen Gale and Martin Saggers; Player of the match: Daryl Mitchell (Worcestershire Rapids)
18:30 (D/N); Scorecard	Karl Brown 42 (24); Saeed Ajmal 2/31 (4 overs)		Daryl Mitchell 53 (40); Arron Lilley 1/19 (4 overs)	Old Trafford, Manchester; Umpires: Stephen Gale and Martin Saggers; Player of the match: Daryl Mitchell (Worcestershire Rapids)
Lancashire Lightning won the toss and elected to bat				Old Trafford, Manchester; Umpires: Stephen Gale and Martin Saggers; Player of the match: Daryl Mitchell (Worcestershire Rapids)

18 June	Derbyshire Falcons (H); 189/7 (20 overs)	v	Leicestershire Foxes; 172/7 (20 overs)	Derbyshire Falcons won by 17 runs
19:00 (D/N); Scorecard	Derbyshire Falcons (H); 189/7 (20 overs)	v	Leicestershire Foxes; 172/7 (20 overs)	County Ground, Derby; Umpires: Tim Robinson and Peter Hartley; Player of the match: Wes Durston (Derbyshire Falcons)
19:00 (D/N); Scorecard	Wes Durston 88 (49); Ben Raine 2/32 (4 overs)		Tom Wells 64* (28); Wes Durston 1/14 (2 overs)	County Ground, Derby; Umpires: Tim Robinson and Peter Hartley; Player of the match: Wes Durston (Derbyshire Falcons)
Leicestershire Foxes won the toss and elected to field				County Ground, Derby; Umpires: Tim Robinson and Peter Hartley; Player of the match: Wes Durston (Derbyshire Falcons)

19 June	Derbyshire Falcons; 136/7 (20 overs)	v	Worcestershire Rapids (H); 139/2 (12.5 overs)	Worcestershire Rapids won by 8 wickets
17:30; Scorecard	Derbyshire Falcons; 136/7 (20 overs)	v	Worcestershire Rapids (H); 139/2 (12.5 overs)	County Ground, Worcester; Umpires: Mike Burns and Graham Lloyd; Player of the match: Moeen Ali (Worcestershire Rapids)
17:30; Scorecard	Wes Durston 29 (29); Moeen Ali 3/28 (4 overs)		Moeen Ali 65 (28); Chesney Hughes 1/19 (2 overs)	County Ground, Worcester; Umpires: Mike Burns and Graham Lloyd; Player of the match: Moeen Ali (Worcestershire Rapids)
Derbyshire Falcons won the toss and elected to bat				County Ground, Worcester; Umpires: Mike Burns and Graham Lloyd; Player of the match: Moeen Ali (Worcestershire Rapids)

19 June	Birmingham Bears (H); 160/5 (20 overs)	v	Leicestershire Foxes; 164/3 (18.3 overs)	Leicestershire Foxes won by 7 wickets
18:30 (D/N); Scorecard	Birmingham Bears (H); 160/5 (20 overs)	v	Leicestershire Foxes; 164/3 (18.3 overs)	Edgbaston, Birmingham; Umpires: Martin Bodenham and Peter Hartley; Player of the match: Ben Raine (Leicestershire Foxes)
18:30 (D/N); Scorecard	Tim Ambrose 66 (54); Clint McKay 2/41 (4 overs)		Umar Akmal 52* (38); Jeetan Patel 1/22 (4 overs)	Edgbaston, Birmingham; Umpires: Martin Bodenham and Peter Hartley; Player of the match: Ben Raine (Leicestershire Foxes)
Birmingham Bears won the toss and elected to bat; Ollie Freckingham (Leicestershire Foxes) made his T20 debut				Edgbaston, Birmingham; Umpires: Martin Bodenham and Peter Hartley; Player of the match: Ben Raine (Leicestershire Foxes)

19 June	Northamptonshire Steelbacks (H); 169/5 (20 overs)	v	Lancashire Lightning; 165/8 (20 overs)	Northamptonshire Steelbacks won by 4 runs
18:30 (D/N); Scorecard	Northamptonshire Steelbacks (H); 169/5 (20 overs)	v	Lancashire Lightning; 165/8 (20 overs)	County Ground, Northampton; Umpires: Neil Mallender and Steve Garratt; Player of the match: James Faulkner (Lancashire Lightning)
18:30 (D/N); Scorecard	Josh Cobb 47 (33); Stephen Parry 2/25 (4 overs)		James Faulkner 73 (45); Azharullah 3/28 (4 overs)	County Ground, Northampton; Umpires: Neil Mallender and Steve Garratt; Player of the match: James Faulkner (Lancashire Lightning)
Lancashire Lightning won the toss and elected to field				County Ground, Northampton; Umpires: Neil Mallender and Steve Garratt; Player of the match: James Faulkner (Lancashire Lightning)

19 June	Yorkshire Vikings (H); 209/4 (20 overs)	v	Nottinghamshire Outlaws; 169/6 (20 overs)	Yorkshire Vikings won by 40 runs
19:00 (D/N); Scorecard	Yorkshire Vikings (H); 209/4 (20 overs)	v	Nottinghamshire Outlaws; 169/6 (20 overs)	Headingley, Leeds; Umpires: Martin Saggers and Jeff Evans; Player of the match: Glenn Maxwell (Yorkshire Vikings)
19:00 (D/N); Scorecard	Glenn Maxwell 92 (48); Luke Fletcher 1/24 (2 overs)		Samit Patel 90* (59); Glenn Maxwell 2/31 (4 overs)	Headingley, Leeds; Umpires: Martin Saggers and Jeff Evans; Player of the match: Glenn Maxwell (Yorkshire Vikings)
Nottinghamshire Outlaws won the toss and elected to field				Headingley, Leeds; Umpires: Martin Saggers and Jeff Evans; Player of the match: Glenn Maxwell (Yorkshire Vikings)

21 June	Yorkshire Vikings; 132/7 (20 overs)	v	Birmingham Bears (H); 136/4 (18.4 overs)	Birmingham Bears won by 6 wickets
14:00; Scorecard	Yorkshire Vikings; 132/7 (20 overs)	v	Birmingham Bears (H); 136/4 (18.4 overs)	Edgbaston, Birmingham; Umpires: Nigel Cowley and Jeff Evans; Player of the match: Recordo Gordon (Birmingham Bears)
14:00; Scorecard	Jack Leaning 45 (44); Recordo Gordon 3/30 (4 overs)		Tim Ambrose 46 (38); Glenn Maxwell 2/26 (4 overs)	Edgbaston, Birmingham; Umpires: Nigel Cowley and Jeff Evans; Player of the match: Recordo Gordon (Birmingham Bears)
Yorkshire Vikings won the toss and elected to bat				Edgbaston, Birmingham; Umpires: Nigel Cowley and Jeff Evans; Player of the match: Recordo Gordon (Birmingham Bears)

25 June	Durham Jets (H); 141 (19.5 overs)	v	Lancashire Lightning; 143/4 (18.1 overs)	Lancashire Lightning won by 6 wickets
18:30 (D/N); Scorecard	Durham Jets (H); 141 (19.5 overs)	v	Lancashire Lightning; 143/4 (18.1 overs)	Riverside Ground, Chester-le-Street; Umpires: Tim Robinson and Steve Garratt; Player of the match: Ashwell Prince (Lancashire Lightning)
18:30 (D/N); Scorecard	Mark Stoneman 51 (29); Kyle Jarvis 3/24 (3 overs)		Ashwell Prince 63* (51); Chris Rushworth 2/43 (4 overs)	Riverside Ground, Chester-le-Street; Umpires: Tim Robinson and Steve Garratt; Player of the match: Ashwell Prince (Lancashire Lightning)
Durham Jets won the toss and elected to bat				Riverside Ground, Chester-le-Street; Umpires: Tim Robinson and Steve Garratt; Player of the match: Ashwell Prince (Lancashire Lightning)

26 June	Leicestershire Foxes (H); 142/7 (20 overs)	v	Yorkshire Vikings; 142/8 (20 overs)	Match tied
17:30; Scorecard	Leicestershire Foxes (H); 142/7 (20 overs)	v	Yorkshire Vikings; 142/8 (20 overs)	Grace Road, Leicester; Umpires: Graham Lloyd and Alex Wharf; Player of the match: Jack Leaning (Yorkshire Vikings)
17:30; Scorecard	Andrea Agathangelou 40 (26); Will Rhodes 1/21 (2 overs)		Jack Leaning 48* (30); Ben Raine 3/23 (4 overs)	Grace Road, Leicester; Umpires: Graham Lloyd and Alex Wharf; Player of the match: Jack Leaning (Yorkshire Vikings)
Yorkshire Vikings won the toss and elected to field				Grace Road, Leicester; Umpires: Graham Lloyd and Alex Wharf; Player of the match: Jack Leaning (Yorkshire Vikings)

26 June	Northamptonshire Steelbacks; 193/8 (20 overs)	v	Worcestershire Rapids (H); 191/6 (20 overs)	Northamptonshire Steelbacks won by 2 runs
17:30; Scorecard	Northamptonshire Steelbacks; 193/8 (20 overs)	v	Worcestershire Rapids (H); 191/6 (20 overs)	County Ground, Worcester; Umpires: Stephen Gale and Mark Benson; Player of the match: Rory Kleinveldt (Northamptonshire Steelbacks)
17:30; Scorecard	Steven Crook 56* (35); Saeed Ajmal 2/41 (4 overs)		Ross Whiteley 41* (29); Rory Kleinveldt 2/25 (4 overs)	County Ground, Worcester; Umpires: Stephen Gale and Mark Benson; Player of the match: Rory Kleinveldt (Northamptonshire Steelbacks)
Worcestershire Rapids won the toss and elected to field				County Ground, Worcester; Umpires: Stephen Gale and Mark Benson; Player of the match: Rory Kleinveldt (Northamptonshire Steelbacks)

26 June	Birmingham Bears; 137/8 (20 overs)	v	Lancashire Lightning (H); 136/8 (20 overs)	Birmingham Bears won by 1 run
18:30 (D/N); Scorecard	Birmingham Bears; 137/8 (20 overs)	v	Lancashire Lightning (H); 136/8 (20 overs)	Old Trafford, Manchester; Umpires: David Millns and Steve O'Shaughnessy; Player of the match: Recordo Gordon (Birmingham Bears)
18:30 (D/N); Scorecard	Varun Chopra 40* (33); James Faulkner 4/26 (4 overs)		James Faulkner 34 (25); Recordo Gordon 4/20 (4 overs)	Old Trafford, Manchester; Umpires: David Millns and Steve O'Shaughnessy; Player of the match: Recordo Gordon (Birmingham Bears)
Birmingham Bears won the toss and elected to bat; Match started 30 minutes late as Birmingham Bears players were stuck in traffic				Old Trafford, Manchester; Umpires: David Millns and Steve O'Shaughnessy; Player of the match: Recordo Gordon (Birmingham Bears)

26 June	Derbyshire Falcons (H); 201/7 (20 overs)	v	Nottinghamshire Outlaws; 167 (19.1 overs)	Derbyshire Falcons won by 34 runs
19:00 (D/N); Scorecard	Derbyshire Falcons (H); 201/7 (20 overs)	v	Nottinghamshire Outlaws; 167 (19.1 overs)	County Ground, Derby; Umpires: Rob Bailey and Nigel Cowley; Player of the match: Chesney Hughes (Derbyshire Falcons)
19:00 (D/N); Scorecard	Chesney Hughes 52 (29); Ben Hilfenhaus 3/29 (4 overs)		Riki Wessels 66 (33); Nathan Rimmington 3/24 (4 overs)	County Ground, Derby; Umpires: Rob Bailey and Nigel Cowley; Player of the match: Chesney Hughes (Derbyshire Falcons)
Derbyshire Falcons won the toss and elected to bat				County Ground, Derby; Umpires: Rob Bailey and Nigel Cowley; Player of the match: Chesney Hughes (Derbyshire Falcons)

27 June	Northamptonshire Steelbacks; 173/5 (20 overs)	v	Nottinghamshire Outlaws (H); 175/3 (18.3 overs)	Nottinghamshire Outlaws won by 7 wickets
14:30; Scorecard	Northamptonshire Steelbacks; 173/5 (20 overs)	v	Nottinghamshire Outlaws (H); 175/3 (18.3 overs)	Trent Bridge, Nottingham; Umpires: Stephen Gale and Graham Lloyd; Player of the match: Samit Patel (Nottinghamshire Outlaws)
14:30; Scorecard	Josh Cobb 84 (56); Ben Hilfenhaus 2/35 (4 overs)		Samit Patel 58* (34); Azharullah 1/22 (2 overs)	Trent Bridge, Nottingham; Umpires: Stephen Gale and Graham Lloyd; Player of the match: Samit Patel (Nottinghamshire Outlaws)
Northamptonshire Steelbacks won the toss and elected to bat				Trent Bridge, Nottingham; Umpires: Stephen Gale and Graham Lloyd; Player of the match: Samit Patel (Nottinghamshire Outlaws)

==== July ====
3 July	Durham Jets (H); 163/5 (20 overs)	v	Leicestershire Foxes; 125 (20.0 overs)	Durham Jets won by 38 runs
18:30 (D/N); Scorecard	Durham Jets (H); 163/5 (20 overs)	v	Leicestershire Foxes; 125 (20.0 overs)	Riverside Ground, Chester-le-Street; Umpires: Nick Cook and Ben Debenham; Player of the match: Mark Stoneman (Durham Jets)
18:30 (D/N); Scorecard	Mark Stoneman 89* (60); Rob Sayer 2/16 (4.0 overs)		Tom Wells 27 (18); John Hastings 3/10 (3.5 overs)	Riverside Ground, Chester-le-Street; Umpires: Nick Cook and Ben Debenham; Player of the match: Mark Stoneman (Durham Jets)
Leicestershire Foxes won the toss and elected to field; Rob Sayer (Leicestershire Foxes) made his T20 debut				Riverside Ground, Chester-le-Street; Umpires: Nick Cook and Ben Debenham; Player of the match: Mark Stoneman (Durham Jets)

3 July	Lancashire Lightning (H); 231/4 (20 overs)	v	Yorkshire Vikings; 202/8 (20 overs)	Lancashire Lightning won by 29 runs
18:30 (D/N); Scorecard	Lancashire Lightning (H); 231/4 (20 overs)	v	Yorkshire Vikings; 202/8 (20 overs)	Old Trafford, Manchester; Umpires: Russell Evans and Stephen Gale; Player of the match: Stephen Parry (Lancashire Lightning)
18:30 (D/N); Scorecard	Karl Brown 69 (35); Matthew Fisher 1/25 (3 overs)		Tim Bresnan 51 (24); Stephen Parry 3/29 (4 overs)	Old Trafford, Manchester; Umpires: Russell Evans and Stephen Gale; Player of the match: Stephen Parry (Lancashire Lightning)
Yorkshire Vikings won the toss and elected to field				Old Trafford, Manchester; Umpires: Russell Evans and Stephen Gale; Player of the match: Stephen Parry (Lancashire Lightning)

3 July	Worcestershire Rapids; 173 (19.3 overs)	v	Nottinghamshire Outlaws (H); 153/9 (20 overs)	Worcestershire Rapids won by 20 runs
18:30 (D/N); Scorecard	Worcestershire Rapids; 173 (19.3 overs)	v	Nottinghamshire Outlaws (H); 153/9 (20 overs)	Trent Bridge. Nottingham; Umpires: Jeremy Lloyds and Martin Saggers; Player of the match: Tom Kohler-Cadmore (Worcestershire Rapids)
18:30 (D/N); Scorecard	Tom Kohler-Cadmore 75 (39); Harry Gurney 3/25 (3.3 overs)		Alex Hales 47 (29); Joe Leach 3/27 (3 overs)	Trent Bridge. Nottingham; Umpires: Jeremy Lloyds and Martin Saggers; Player of the match: Tom Kohler-Cadmore (Worcestershire Rapids)
Worcestershire Rapids won the toss and elected to bat				Trent Bridge. Nottingham; Umpires: Jeremy Lloyds and Martin Saggers; Player of the match: Tom Kohler-Cadmore (Worcestershire Rapids)

3 July	Birmingham Bears (H); 242/2 (20 overs)	v	Derbyshire Falcons; 182 (19.4 overs)	Birmingham Bears won by 60 runs
18:30 (D/N); Scorecard	Birmingham Bears (H); 242/2 (20 overs)	v	Derbyshire Falcons; 182 (19.4 overs)	Edgbaston, Birmingham; Umpires: Neil Bainton and Jeff Evans; Player of the match: Brendon McCullum (Birmingham Bears)
18:30 (D/N); Scorecard	Brendon McCullum 158* (64); Shiv Thakor 1/40 (4 overs)		Wes Durston 43 (24); Jeetan Patel 2/18 (2 overs)	Edgbaston, Birmingham; Umpires: Neil Bainton and Jeff Evans; Player of the match: Brendon McCullum (Birmingham Bears)
Derbyshire Falcons won the toss and elected to field				Edgbaston, Birmingham; Umpires: Neil Bainton and Jeff Evans; Player of the match: Brendon McCullum (Birmingham Bears)

4 July	Birmingham Bears; 160/8 (20 overs)	v	Leicestershire Foxes (H); 152/4 (20 overs)	Birmingham Bears won by 8 runs
14:30; Scorecard	Birmingham Bears; 160/8 (20 overs)	v	Leicestershire Foxes (H); 152/4 (20 overs)	Grace Road, Leicester; Umpires: Stephen Gale and Jeremy Lloyds; Player of the match: Rikki Clarke (Birmingham Bears)
14:30; Scorecard	Rikki Clarke 46 (36); Ben Raine 3/24 (4 overs)		Mark Cosgrove 74 (56); Rikki Clarke 1/10 (4 overs)	Grace Road, Leicester; Umpires: Stephen Gale and Jeremy Lloyds; Player of the match: Rikki Clarke (Birmingham Bears)
Birmingham Bears won the toss and elected to bat				Grace Road, Leicester; Umpires: Stephen Gale and Jeremy Lloyds; Player of the match: Rikki Clarke (Birmingham Bears)

5 July	Northamptonshire Steelbacks; 155/6 (20 overs)	v	Derbyshire Falcons (H); 140/5 (18 overs)	Northamptonshire won by 3 runs (D/L method)
14:30; Scorecard	Northamptonshire Steelbacks; 155/6 (20 overs)	v	Derbyshire Falcons (H); 140/5 (18 overs)	Queen's Park, Chesterfield; Umpires: Paul Baldwin and Martin Saggers; Player of the match: Wes Durston (Derbyshire Falcons)
14:30; Scorecard	Josh Cobb 48 (32); Alex Hughes 2/23 (4 overs)		Wes Durston 60 (39); Graeme White 2/27 (4 overs)	Queen's Park, Chesterfield; Umpires: Paul Baldwin and Martin Saggers; Player of the match: Wes Durston (Derbyshire Falcons)
Derbyshire Falcons won the toss and elected to field				Queen's Park, Chesterfield; Umpires: Paul Baldwin and Martin Saggers; Player of the match: Wes Durston (Derbyshire Falcons)

5 July	Worcestershire Rapids (H); 128/5 (19 overs)	v	Durham Jets; 127/9 (20 overs)	Worcestershire won by 5 wickets
14:30 scorecard	Worcestershire Rapids (H); 128/5 (19 overs)	v	Durham Jets; 127/9 (20 overs)	County Ground, Worcester; Umpires: Rob Bailey and Russell Evans; Player of the match: Saeed Ajmal (Worcestershire Rapids)
14:30 scorecard	Richard Oliver 70* (57); Chris Rushworth 2/14 (4 overs)		Phil Mustard 35 (37); Saeed Ajmal 3/13 (4 overs)	County Ground, Worcester; Umpires: Rob Bailey and Russell Evans; Player of the match: Saeed Ajmal (Worcestershire Rapids)
Worcestershire won the toss and elected to field				County Ground, Worcester; Umpires: Rob Bailey and Russell Evans; Player of the match: Saeed Ajmal (Worcestershire Rapids)

10 July	Lancashire Lightning; 191/5 (20 overs)	v	Leicestershire Foxes (H); 151/8 (20 overs)	Lancashire won by 40 runs
17:30 scorecard	Lancashire Lightning; 191/5 (20 overs)	v	Leicestershire Foxes (H); 151/8 (20 overs)	Grace Road, Leicester; Umpires: Neil Bainton and Martin Saggers; Player of the match: Steven Croft (Lancashire Lightning)
17:30 scorecard	Paul Horton 63 (48); Clint McKay 1/26 (4 overs)		Tom Wells 27 (21); Stephen Parry 2/29 (4 overs)	Grace Road, Leicester; Umpires: Neil Bainton and Martin Saggers; Player of the match: Steven Croft (Lancashire Lightning)
Leicestershire won the toss and elected to field; Aadil Ali (Leicestershire Foxes) made his T20 debut				Grace Road, Leicester; Umpires: Neil Bainton and Martin Saggers; Player of the match: Steven Croft (Lancashire Lightning)

10 July	Birmingham Bears; 161/5 (19.3 overs)	v	Worcestershire Rapids (H); 160/5 (20 overs)	Birmingham won by 5 wickets
17:30; Scorecard	Birmingham Bears; 161/5 (19.3 overs)	v	Worcestershire Rapids (H); 160/5 (20 overs)	County Ground, Worcester; Umpires: Stephen Gale and Peter Hartley; Player of the match: Rikki Clarke (Birmingham Bears)
17:30; Scorecard	Rikki Clarke 52* (43); Brett D'Oliveira 1/25 (4 overs)		Tom Kohler-Cadmore 66 (51); Josh Poysden 2/20 (4 overs)	County Ground, Worcester; Umpires: Stephen Gale and Peter Hartley; Player of the match: Rikki Clarke (Birmingham Bears)
Birmingham won the toss and elected to field				County Ground, Worcester; Umpires: Stephen Gale and Peter Hartley; Player of the match: Rikki Clarke (Birmingham Bears)

10 July	Nottinghamshire Outlaws (H); 172/6 (20 overs)	v	Derbyshire Falcons; 170/4 (20 overs)	Nottinghamshire won by 2 runs
18:30 (D/N) scorecard	Nottinghamshire Outlaws (H); 172/6 (20 overs)	v	Derbyshire Falcons; 170/4 (20 overs)	Trent Bridge, Nottingham; Umpires: Richard Kettleborough and Graham Lloyd; Player of the match: Jake Ball (Nottinghamshire Outlaws)
18:30 (D/N) scorecard	Alex Hales 54 (35); Shiv Thakor 3/25 (4 overs)		Hamish Rutherford 62 (47); Jake Ball 3/36 (4 overs)	Trent Bridge, Nottingham; Umpires: Richard Kettleborough and Graham Lloyd; Player of the match: Jake Ball (Nottinghamshire Outlaws)
Nottinghamshire won the toss and elected to bat				Trent Bridge, Nottingham; Umpires: Richard Kettleborough and Graham Lloyd; Player of the match: Jake Ball (Nottinghamshire Outlaws)

10 July	Yorkshire Vikings (H); 194/5 (18.5 overs)	v	Durham Jets; 191/6 (20 overs)	Yorkshire won by 5 wickets
18:30 (D/N) scorecard	Yorkshire Vikings (H); 194/5 (18.5 overs)	v	Durham Jets; 191/6 (20 overs)	Headingley, Leeds; Umpires: Paul Baldwin and David Millns; Player of the match: Jonny Bairstow (Yorkshire Vikings)
18:30 (D/N) scorecard	Jonny Bairstow 92 (42); John Hastongs 2/25 (3 overs)		Graham Clark 91* (57); Adil Rashid 2/26 (4 overs)	Headingley, Leeds; Umpires: Paul Baldwin and David Millns; Player of the match: Jonny Bairstow (Yorkshire Vikings)
Durham won the toss and elected to bat; Josh Shaw (Yorkshire Vikings) made his T20 debut				Headingley, Leeds; Umpires: Paul Baldwin and David Millns; Player of the match: Jonny Bairstow (Yorkshire Vikings)

12 July	Derbyshire Falcons (H); 150/6 (18.5 overs)	v	Yorkshire Vikings; 146/9 (20 overs)	Derbyshire won by 4 wickets
14:30 scorecard	Derbyshire Falcons (H); 150/6 (18.5 overs)	v	Yorkshire Vikings; 146/9 (20 overs)	Queen's Park, Chesterfield; Umpires: Neil Bainton and Richard Kettleborough; Player of the match: Wes Durston (Derbyshire Falcons)
14:30 scorecard	Wayne Madsen 41 (38); Liam Plunkett 1/32 (4 overs)		Glenn Maxwell 45 (29); Wes Durston 3/14 (4 overs)	Queen's Park, Chesterfield; Umpires: Neil Bainton and Richard Kettleborough; Player of the match: Wes Durston (Derbyshire Falcons)
Derbyshire won the toss and elected to field				Queen's Park, Chesterfield; Umpires: Neil Bainton and Richard Kettleborough; Player of the match: Wes Durston (Derbyshire Falcons)

12 July	Northamptonshire Steelbacks (H); 115/1 (8.3 overs)	v	Leicestershire Foxes; 111/4 (10 overs)	Northamptonshire won by 9 wickets (D/L method)
14:30 scorecard	Northamptonshire Steelbacks (H); 115/1 (8.3 overs)	v	Leicestershire Foxes; 111/4 (10 overs)	County Ground, Northampton; Umpires: Steve O'Shaughnessy and Alex Wharf; Player of the match: Richard Levi (Northamptonshire Steelbacks)
14:30 scorecard	Richard Levi 67* (28); Tom Wells 1/17 (2 overs)		Grant Elliott 56 (29); Rory Kleinveldt 1/15 (2 overs)	County Ground, Northampton; Umpires: Steve O'Shaughnessy and Alex Wharf; Player of the match: Richard Levi (Northamptonshire Steelbacks)
Northamptonshire won the toss and elected to field; Zak Chappell and Lewis Hill (both Leicestershire Foxes) made their T20 debuts				County Ground, Northampton; Umpires: Steve O'Shaughnessy and Alex Wharf; Player of the match: Richard Levi (Northamptonshire Steelbacks)

14 July	Worcestershire Rapids; 191/6 (20 overs)	v	Yorkshire Vikings (H); 111/4 (10 overs)	Worcestershire won by 74 runs
18:30 (D/N) scorecard	Worcestershire Rapids; 191/6 (20 overs)	v	Yorkshire Vikings (H); 111/4 (10 overs)	Headingley, Leeds; Umpires: Nick Cook and Russell Evans; Player of the match: Ross Whiteley (Worcestershire Rapids)
18:30 (D/N) scorecard	Ross Whiteley 91* (41); Will Rhodes 2/30 (4 overs)		Jack Leaning 27 (20); Brett D'Oliveira 3/29 (4 overs)	Headingley, Leeds; Umpires: Nick Cook and Russell Evans; Player of the match: Ross Whiteley (Worcestershire Rapids)
Worcestershire won the toss and elected to bat; Karl Carver and Ryan Gibson (both Yorkshire Vickings) made their T20 debut				Headingley, Leeds; Umpires: Nick Cook and Russell Evans; Player of the match: Ross Whiteley (Worcestershire Rapids)

15 July	Nottinghamshire Outlaws; 140/7 (20 overs)	v	Lancashire Lightning (H); 137/4 (20 overs)	Nottinghamshire won by 3 wickets
18:30 (D/N) scorecard	Nottinghamshire Outlaws; 140/7 (20 overs)	v	Lancashire Lightning (H); 137/4 (20 overs)	Old Trafford, Manchester; Umpires: Neil Bainton and Jeff Evans; Player of the match: James Taylor (Nottinghamshire Outlaws)
18:30 (D/N) scorecard	James Taylor 33* (21); Jordan Clark 2/15 (4 overs)		Karl Brown 51 (43); Steven Mullaney 1/14 (4 overs)	Old Trafford, Manchester; Umpires: Neil Bainton and Jeff Evans; Player of the match: James Taylor (Nottinghamshire Outlaws)
Lancashire won the toss and elected to bat				Old Trafford, Manchester; Umpires: Neil Bainton and Jeff Evans; Player of the match: James Taylor (Nottinghamshire Outlaws)

17 July	Lancashire Lightning; 145/6 (20 overs)	v	Birmingham Bears (H); 137 (19.5 overs)	Lancashire Lightning win by 8 runs
18:30 (D/N); Scorecard	Lancashire Lightning; 145/6 (20 overs)	v	Birmingham Bears (H); 137 (19.5 overs)	Edgbaston, Birmingham; Umpires: Billy Taylor and Paul Baldwin; Player of the match: Steven Croft (Lancashire Lightning)
18:30 (D/N); Scorecard	Steven Croft 64* (51); Jeetan Patel 2/14 (4 overs)		Brendon McCullum 41 (25); James Faulkner 3/19 (4 overs)	Edgbaston, Birmingham; Umpires: Billy Taylor and Paul Baldwin; Player of the match: Steven Croft (Lancashire Lightning)
Birmingham Bears won the toss and elected to field				Edgbaston, Birmingham; Umpires: Billy Taylor and Paul Baldwin; Player of the match: Steven Croft (Lancashire Lightning)

17 July	Yorkshire Vikings; 153/7 (20 overs)	v	Northamptonshire Steelbacks (H); 156/4 (19 overs)	Northamptonshire won by 6 wickets
18:30 (D/N); Scorecard	Yorkshire Vikings; 153/7 (20 overs)	v	Northamptonshire Steelbacks (H); 156/4 (19 overs)	County Ground, Northampton; Umpires: Peter Hartley and Graham Lloyd; Player of the match: David Willey (Northamptonshire Steelbacks)
18:30 (D/N); Scorecard	Alex Lees 46 (42); Josh Cobb 1/14 (2 overs)		Alex Wakely 46 (42); Ben Coad 2/24 (3 overs)	County Ground, Northampton; Umpires: Peter Hartley and Graham Lloyd; Player of the match: David Willey (Northamptonshire Steelbacks)
Northamptonshire Steelbacks won the toss and elected to field; Ben Coad and Matthew Waite (both Yorkshire Vikings) made their T20 debuts				County Ground, Northampton; Umpires: Peter Hartley and Graham Lloyd; Player of the match: David Willey (Northamptonshire Steelbacks)

17 July	Derbyshire Falcons (H); 149/8 (20 overs)	v	Worcestershire Rapids; 150/6 (19.3 overs)	Worcestershire Rapids won by 4 wickets
19:00 (D/N); Scorecard	Derbyshire Falcons (H); 149/8 (20 overs)	v	Worcestershire Rapids; 150/6 (19.3 overs)	County Ground, Derby; Umpires: Martin Bodenham and David Millns; Player of the match: Joe Leach (Worcestershire Rapids)
19:00 (D/N); Scorecard	Billy Godleman 33 (24); Saeed Ajmal 2/21 (4 overs)		Richard Oliver 45 (38); Alex Hughes 2/21 (4 overs)	County Ground, Derby; Umpires: Martin Bodenham and David Millns; Player of the match: Joe Leach (Worcestershire Rapids)
Derbyshire Falcons won the toss and elected to bat				County Ground, Derby; Umpires: Martin Bodenham and David Millns; Player of the match: Joe Leach (Worcestershire Rapids)

17 July	Nottinghamshire Outlaws; 198/5 (20 overs)	v	Durham Jets (H); 156/6 (20 overs)	Nottinghamshire Outlaws won by 42 runs
19:00 (D/N); Scorecard	Nottinghamshire Outlaws; 198/5 (20 overs)	v	Durham Jets (H); 156/6 (20 overs)	Riverside Ground, Chester-le-Street; Umpires: Russell Evans and Neil Mallender; Player of the match: Riki Wessels (Nottinghamshire Outlaws)
19:00 (D/N); Scorecard	Riki Wessels 97 (51); Usman Arshad 2/36 (3 overs)		John Hastings 42 (22); Steven Mullaney 2/28 (4.0 overs)	Riverside Ground, Chester-le-Street; Umpires: Russell Evans and Neil Mallender; Player of the match: Riki Wessels (Nottinghamshire Outlaws)
Durham Jets won the toss and elected to field				Riverside Ground, Chester-le-Street; Umpires: Russell Evans and Neil Mallender; Player of the match: Riki Wessels (Nottinghamshire Outlaws)

22 July	Birmingham Bears (H); 154/5 (20 overs)	v	Northamptonshire Steelbacks; 153/6 (20 overs)	Birmingham Bears won by 1 run
18:30 (D/N); Scorecard	Birmingham Bears (H); 154/5 (20 overs)	v	Northamptonshire Steelbacks; 153/6 (20 overs)	Edgbaston, Birmingham; Umpires: Peter Hartley and Richard Illingworth; Player of the match: Varun Chopra (Birmingham Bears)
18:30 (D/N); Scorecard	Varun Chopra 52 (48); Steven Crook 3/30 (4 overs)		Alex Wakely 51* (42); Oliver Hannon-Dalby 3/36 (4 overs)	Edgbaston, Birmingham; Umpires: Peter Hartley and Richard Illingworth; Player of the match: Varun Chopra (Birmingham Bears)
Northamptonshire Steelbacks won the toss and elected to field				Edgbaston, Birmingham; Umpires: Peter Hartley and Richard Illingworth; Player of the match: Varun Chopra (Birmingham Bears)

24 July	Leicestershire Foxes (H)	v	Nottinghamshire Outlaws	Match abandoned
17:30 scorecard	Leicestershire Foxes (H)	v	Nottinghamshire Outlaws	Grace Road, Leicester; Umpires: Stephen Gale and Neil Mallender

24 July	Worcestershire Rapids (H)	v	Lancashire Lightning	Match abandoned
17:30; Scorecard	Worcestershire Rapids (H)	v	Lancashire Lightning	County Ground, Worcester; Umpires: Steven Garratt and Jeremy Lloyds

24 July	Northamptonshire Steelbacks (H)	v	Durham Jets	Match abandoned
18:30 (D/N) scorecard	Northamptonshire Steelbacks (H)	v	Durham Jets	County Ground, Northampton; Umpires: Michael Gough and Martin Bodenham

24 July	Birmingham Bears; 145 (18.4 overs)	v	Yorkshire Vikings (H); 148/2 (19.3 overs)	Yorkshire won by 8 wickets
18:30 (D/N) scorecard	Birmingham Bears; 145 (18.4 overs)	v	Yorkshire Vikings (H); 148/2 (19.3 overs)	Headingley, Leeds; Umpires: Peter Hartley and Neil Bainton; Player of the match: Jack Leaning (Yorkshire Vikings)
18:30 (D/N) scorecard	Laurie Evans 25 (20); Will Rhodes 3/27 (3 overs)		Alex Lees 63 (47); Rikki Clarke 1/22 (4 overs)	Headingley, Leeds; Umpires: Peter Hartley and Neil Bainton; Player of the match: Jack Leaning (Yorkshire Vikings)
Warwickshire won the toss and elected to bat				Headingley, Leeds; Umpires: Peter Hartley and Neil Bainton; Player of the match: Jack Leaning (Yorkshire Vikings)

== South Division ==
=== Table ===
Pos	Team	Pld	W	L	T	NR	Ded	Pts	NRR
1	Kent Spitfires	14	9	4	0	1	0	19	0.166
2	Sussex Sharks	14	7	5	0	2	0	16	0.206
3	Hampshire	14	8	6	0	0	0	16	−0.120
4	Essex Eagles	14	7	6	0	1	0	15	0.208
5	Gloucestershire	14	7	7	0	0	0	14	0.354
6	Glamorgan	14	7	7	0	0	0	14	−0.522
7	Surrey	14	5	6	0	3	0	13	−0.145
8	Somerset	14	4	8	0	2	0	10	−0.184
9	Middlesex	14	4	9	0	1	0	9	0.030

=== Results ===
	Essex Eagles	Glamorgan	Gloucestershire	Hampshire	Kent Spitfires	Middlesex	Somerset	Surrey	Sussex Sharks
Essex Eagles		Essex Eagles; 16 runs	Essex Eagles; 18 runs	Essex Eagles; 78 runs	Abandoned; No result	Essex Eagles; 4 wickets	Somerset; 3 wickets	Surrey; 44 runs	
Glamorgan	Essex Eagles; 5 wickets		Gloucestershire; 8 wickets	Hampshire; 21 runs		Glamorgan; 4 runs	Glamorgan; 2 runs (D/L)	Surrey; 19 runs	Sussex Sharks; 10 wickets
Gloucestershire	Gloucestershire; 34 runs	Glamorgan; 19 runs		Gloucestershire; 5 wickets	Kent Spitfires; 3 wickets	Gloucestershire; 7 wickets	Somerset; 5 wickets		Sussex Sharks; 3 wickets
Hampshire	Hampshire; 17 runs	Glamorgan; 23 runs			Kent Spitfires; 5 wickets	Hampshire; 19 runs	Hampshire; 6 runs	Hampshire; 29 runs	Sussex Sharks; 7 wickets
Kent Spitfires	Kent Spitfires; 6 wickets	Glamorgan; 1 run	Gloucestershire; 9 wickets	Hampshire; 6 wickets			Kent Spitfires; 22 runs	Kent Spitfires; 23 runs	Kent Spitfires; 7 runs
Middlesex	Middlesex; 6 wickets		Gloucestershire; 43 runs	Hampshire; 21 runs	Middlesex; 115 runs		Somerset; 9 wickets	Middlesex; 43 runs	Sussex Sharks; 7 wickets
Somerset		Glamorgan; 3 runs	Gloucestershire; 8 wickets	Somerset; 8 wickets	Kent Spitfires; 3 runs	Abandoned; No result		Abandoned; No result	Sussex Sharks; 5 runs
Surrey	Essex Eagles; 6 wickets	Glamorgan; 25 runs	Surrey; 4 wickets		Kent Spitfires; 54 runs	Surrey; 8 wickets	Surrey; 38 runs		Abandoned; No result
Sussex Sharks	Essex Eagles; 7 wickets	Sussex Sharks; 8 wickets	Sussex Sharks; 6 runs	Hampshire; 4 runs	Kent Spitfires; 7 wickets	Middlesex; 42 runs		Abandoned; No result	

Home team win	Away team win	Match tied	Match abandoned

=== Fixtures ===
All times are BST.

==== May ====
15 May	Middlesex; 175/3 (20 overs)	v	Gloucestershire (H); 179/3 (19 overs)	Gloucestershire won by 7 wickets
17:30; Scorecard	Middlesex; 175/3 (20 overs)	v	Gloucestershire (H); 179/3 (19 overs)	County Ground, Bristol; Umpires: Nigel Cowley and Jeremy Lloyds; Player of the match: Ian Cockbain (Gloucestershire)
17:30; Scorecard	Nick Compton 78 (53); Jack Taylor 1/29 (4 overs)		Ian Cockbain 91* (49); Steven Finn 2/29 (4 overs)	County Ground, Bristol; Umpires: Nigel Cowley and Jeremy Lloyds; Player of the match: Ian Cockbain (Gloucestershire)
Gloucestershire won the toss and elected to field; Matt Taylor (Gloucestershire) made his T20 debut				County Ground, Bristol; Umpires: Nigel Cowley and Jeremy Lloyds; Player of the match: Ian Cockbain (Gloucestershire)

15 May	Glamorgan; 240/3 (20 overs)	v	Surrey (H); 215 (19.3 overs)	Glamorgan won by 25 runs
18:30 (D/N); Scorecard	Glamorgan; 240/3 (20 overs)	v	Surrey (H); 215 (19.3 overs)	The Oval, London; Umpires: Mark Benson and Steve O'Shaughnessy; Player of the match: Colin Ingram (Glamorgan)
18:30 (D/N); Scorecard	Colin Ingram 91 (47); Aneesh Kapil 1/4 (1 over)		Zafar Ansari 67* (32); Dean Cosker 4/30 (4 overs)	The Oval, London; Umpires: Mark Benson and Steve O'Shaughnessy; Player of the match: Colin Ingram (Glamorgan)
Surrey won the toss and elected to field				The Oval, London; Umpires: Mark Benson and Steve O'Shaughnessy; Player of the match: Colin Ingram (Glamorgan)

15 May	Hampshire (H); 173/4 (20 overs)	v	Essex Eagles; 156 (19.3 overs)	Hampshire won by 17 runs
19:00 (D/N); Scorecard	Hampshire (H); 173/4 (20 overs)	v	Essex Eagles; 156 (19.3 overs)	The Rose Bowl, Southampton; Umpires: Steve Garratt and David Millns; Player of the match: Jimmy Adams (Hampshire)
19:00 (D/N); Scorecard	Jimmy Adams 55* (25); Ryan ten Doeschate 1/15 (2 overs)		Ryan ten Doeschate 68 (44); Yasir Arafat 3/27 (3.3 overs)	The Rose Bowl, Southampton; Umpires: Steve Garratt and David Millns; Player of the match: Jimmy Adams (Hampshire)
Hampshire won the toss and elected to bat; Nick Browne and Callum Taylor (both Essex Eagles) made their T20 debut				The Rose Bowl, Southampton; Umpires: Steve Garratt and David Millns; Player of the match: Jimmy Adams (Hampshire)

15 May	Kent Spitfires (H); 185/9 (20 overs)	v	Sussex Sharks; 178/6 (20 overs)	Kent won by 7 runs
19:00 (D/N); Scorecard	Kent Spitfires (H); 185/9 (20 overs)	v	Sussex Sharks; 178/6 (20 overs)	St Lawrence Ground, Canterbury; Umpires: Neil Bainton and Nigel Llong; Player of the match: Oliver Robinson (Sussex Sharks)
19:00 (D/N); Scorecard	Sam Billings 46 (28); Oliver Robinson 3/35 (4 overs)		Chris Nash 61 (45); Mitchell Claydon 2/29 (4 overs)	St Lawrence Ground, Canterbury; Umpires: Neil Bainton and Nigel Llong; Player of the match: Oliver Robinson (Sussex Sharks)
Kent Spitfires won the toss and elected to bat				St Lawrence Ground, Canterbury; Umpires: Neil Bainton and Nigel Llong; Player of the match: Oliver Robinson (Sussex Sharks)

16 May	Surrey; 205/5 (20 overs)	v	Essex Eagles (H); 161 (20 overs)	Surrey won by 44 runs
13:00; Scorecard	Surrey; 205/5 (20 overs)	v	Essex Eagles (H); 161 (20 overs)	County Ground, Chelmsford; Umpires: David Millns and Martin Saggers; Player of the match: Tom Curran (Surrey)
13:00; Scorecard	Steven Davies 53 (25); Greg Smith 1/21 (2 overs)		Greg Smith 44 (35); Tom Curran 4/35 (4 overs)	County Ground, Chelmsford; Umpires: David Millns and Martin Saggers; Player of the match: Tom Curran (Surrey)
Essex Eagles won the toss and elected to field; Daniel Lawrence (Essex Eagles) made his T20 debut				County Ground, Chelmsford; Umpires: David Millns and Martin Saggers; Player of the match: Tom Curran (Surrey)

17 May	Sussex Sharks (H); 167/5 (20 overs)	v	Gloucestershire; 161/9 (20 overs)	Sussex Sharks won by 6 runs
14:30; Scorecard	Sussex Sharks (H); 167/5 (20 overs)	v	Gloucestershire; 161/9 (20 overs)	County Ground, Hove; Umpires: Mark Benson and David Millns; Player of the match: Will Beer (Sussex Sharks)
14:30; Scorecard	Mahela Jayawardene 43 (30); Tom Smith 3/23 (4 overs)		Hamish Marshall 45 (26); Tymal Mills 3/30 (4 overs)	County Ground, Hove; Umpires: Mark Benson and David Millns; Player of the match: Will Beer (Sussex Sharks)
Gloucestershire won the toss and elected to field				County Ground, Hove; Umpires: Mark Benson and David Millns; Player of the match: Will Beer (Sussex Sharks)

22 May	Sussex Sharks; 175/6 (20 overs)	v	Somerset (H); 170/8 (20 overs)	Sussex Sharks won by 5 runs
17:30; Scorecard	Sussex Sharks; 175/6 (20 overs)	v	Somerset (H); 170/8 (20 overs)	County Ground, Taunton; Umpires: Nigel Cowley and Martin Saggers; Player of the match: Will Beer (Sussex Sharks)
17:30; Scorecard	Luke Wright 49 (35); Jamie Overton 2/33 (3 overs)		Jim Allenby 79 (56); Will Beer 3/23 (4 overs)	County Ground, Taunton; Umpires: Nigel Cowley and Martin Saggers; Player of the match: Will Beer (Sussex Sharks)
Sussex Sharks won the toss and elected to bat; Jamie Overton (Somerset) made his T20 debut				County Ground, Taunton; Umpires: Nigel Cowley and Martin Saggers; Player of the match: Will Beer (Sussex Sharks)

22 May	Glamorgan (H); 144/8 (20 overs)	v	Essex Eagles; 145/5 (17.4 overs)	Essex Eagles won by 5 wickets
18:30 (D/N); Scorecard	Glamorgan (H); 144/8 (20 overs)	v	Essex Eagles; 145/5 (17.4 overs)	Sophia Gardens, Cardiff; Umpires: Graham Lloyd and Jeremy Lloyds; Player of the match: Ravi Bopara (Essex Eagles)
18:30 (D/N); Scorecard	Chris Cooke 31 (30); Shaun Tait 3/28 (4 overs)		Ravi Bopara 81* (53); Michael Hogan 2/19 (4 overs)	Sophia Gardens, Cardiff; Umpires: Graham Lloyd and Jeremy Lloyds; Player of the match: Ravi Bopara (Essex Eagles)
Essex Eagles won the toss and elected to field				Sophia Gardens, Cardiff; Umpires: Graham Lloyd and Jeremy Lloyds; Player of the match: Ravi Bopara (Essex Eagles)

22 May	Hampshire (H); 172/6 (20 overs)	v	Kent Spitfires; 178/5 (19.2 overs)	Kent Spitfires won by 5 wickets
19:00 (D/N); Scorecard	Hampshire (H); 172/6 (20 overs)	v	Kent Spitfires; 178/5 (19.2 overs)	The Rose Bowl, Southampton; Umpires: Rob Bailey and Tim Robinson; Player of the match: Alex Blake (Kent Spitfires)
19:00 (D/N); Scorecard	James Vince 66 (43); David Griffiths 2/36 (4 overs)		Alex Blake 71* (30); Will Smith 3/24 (4 overs)	The Rose Bowl, Southampton; Umpires: Rob Bailey and Tim Robinson; Player of the match: Alex Blake (Kent Spitfires)
Hampshire won the toss and elected to bat				The Rose Bowl, Southampton; Umpires: Rob Bailey and Tim Robinson; Player of the match: Alex Blake (Kent Spitfires)

24 May	Gloucestershire (H); 199/4 (20 overs)	v	Essex Eagles; 165 (18.4 overs)	Gloucestershire won by 34 runs
14:30; Scorecard	Gloucestershire (H); 199/4 (20 overs)	v	Essex Eagles; 165 (18.4 overs)	County Ground, Bristol; Umpires: Jeff Evans and Alex Wharf; Player of the match: Michael Klinger (Gloucestershire)
14:30; Scorecard	Michael Klinger 126* (68); Reece Topley 2/28 (4 overs)		Tom Westley 67 (40); Tom Smith 5/39 (4 overs)	County Ground, Bristol; Umpires: Jeff Evans and Alex Wharf; Player of the match: Michael Klinger (Gloucestershire)
Essex Eagles won the toss and elected to field				County Ground, Bristol; Umpires: Jeff Evans and Alex Wharf; Player of the match: Michael Klinger (Gloucestershire)

28 May	Middlesex (H); 205/5 (20 overs)	v	Kent Spitfires; 90 (14.4 overs)	Middlesex won by 115 runs
18:15 (D/N); Scorecard	Middlesex (H); 205/5 (20 overs)	v	Kent Spitfires; 90 (14.4 overs)	Lord's, London; Umpires: Steve Garratt and Alex Wharf; Player of the match: Paul Stirling (Middlesex)
18:15 (D/N); Scorecard	Paul Stirling 90 (50); Darren Stevens 2/44 (4 overs)		Sam Northeast 20 (22); James Franklin 5/21 (4 overs)	Lord's, London; Umpires: Steve Garratt and Alex Wharf; Player of the match: Paul Stirling (Middlesex)
Middlesex won the toss and elected to bat; Nathan Sowter (Middlesex) made his T20 debut				Lord's, London; Umpires: Steve Garratt and Alex Wharf; Player of the match: Paul Stirling (Middlesex)

29 May	Kent Spitfires (H); 193/8 (20 overs)	v	Surrey; 170 (20 overs)	Kent Spitfires won by 23 runs
17:30; Scorecard	Kent Spitfires (H); 193/8 (20 overs)	v	Surrey; 170 (20 overs)	St Lawrence Ground, Canterbury; Umpires: Ben Debenham and Michael Gough; Player of the match: Sam Northeast (Kent Spitfires)
17:30; Scorecard	Sam Northeast 96 (47); Tom Curran 3/31 (4 overs)		Moises Henriques 63 (47); Fabian Cowdrey 2/40 (4 overs)	St Lawrence Ground, Canterbury; Umpires: Ben Debenham and Michael Gough; Player of the match: Sam Northeast (Kent Spitfires)
Kent Spitfires won the toss and elected to bat				St Lawrence Ground, Canterbury; Umpires: Ben Debenham and Michael Gough; Player of the match: Sam Northeast (Kent Spitfires)

29 May	Hampshire; 148/8 (20 overs)	v	Glamorgan (H); 127/8 (20 overs)	Hampshire won by 21 runs
18:30 (D/N); Scorecard	Hampshire; 148/8 (20 overs)	v	Glamorgan (H); 127/8 (20 overs)	Sophia Gardens, Cardiff; Umpires: Jeff Evans and David Millns; Player of the match: Graham Wagg (Glamorgan)
18:30 (D/N); Scorecard	Sean Ervine 49 (35); Graham Wagg 4/27 (4 overs)		Jacques Rudolph 38* (34); Chris Wood 4/16 (4 overs)	Sophia Gardens, Cardiff; Umpires: Jeff Evans and David Millns; Player of the match: Graham Wagg (Glamorgan)
Glamorgan won the toss and elected to field				Sophia Gardens, Cardiff; Umpires: Jeff Evans and David Millns; Player of the match: Graham Wagg (Glamorgan)

29 May	Essex Eagles (H); 176 (20 overs)	v	Somerset; 177/7 (20 overs)	Somerset won by 3 wickets
19:00 (D/N); Scorecard	Essex Eagles (H); 176 (20 overs)	v	Somerset; 177/7 (20 overs)	County Ground, Chelmsford; Umpires: Mark Benson and Steve O'Shaughnessy; Player of the match: Chris Gayle (Somerset)
19:00 (D/N); Scorecard	Tom Westley 68 (56); Alfonso Thomas 4/37 (4 overs)		Chris Gayle 92 (59); Shaun Tait 2/29 (4 overs)	County Ground, Chelmsford; Umpires: Mark Benson and Steve O'Shaughnessy; Player of the match: Chris Gayle (Somerset)
Somerset won the toss and elected to field				County Ground, Chelmsford; Umpires: Mark Benson and Steve O'Shaughnessy; Player of the match: Chris Gayle (Somerset)

29 May	Middlesex; 221/2 (20 overs)	v	Sussex Sharks (H); 179/9 (20 overs)	Middlesex won by 42 runs
19:00 (D/N); Scorecard	Middlesex; 221/2 (20 overs)	v	Sussex Sharks (H); 179/9 (20 overs)	County Ground, Hove; Umpires: Nigel Cowley and Stephen Gale; Player of the match: Dawid Malan (Middlesex)
19:00 (D/N); Scorecard	Dawid Malan 115* (64); Oliver Robinson 2/45 (4 overs)		Luke Wright 91 (47); Kyle Abbott 5/14 (4 overs)	County Ground, Hove; Umpires: Nigel Cowley and Stephen Gale; Player of the match: Dawid Malan (Middlesex)
Middlesex won the toss and elected to bat				County Ground, Hove; Umpires: Nigel Cowley and Stephen Gale; Player of the match: Dawid Malan (Middlesex)

31 May	Kent Spitfires; 227/7 (20 overs)	v	Somerset (H); 224/7 (20 overs)	Kent Spitfires won by 3 runs
14:30; Scorecard	Kent Spitfires; 227/7 (20 overs)	v	Somerset (H); 224/7 (20 overs)	County Ground, Taunton; Umpires: Nigel Cowley and Stephen Gale; Player of the match: Chris Gayle (Somerset)
14:30; Scorecard	Sam Northeast 114 (58); Alfonso Thomas 3/46 (4 overs)		Chris Gayle 151* (62); Mitchell Claydon 2/23 (4 overs)	County Ground, Taunton; Umpires: Nigel Cowley and Stephen Gale; Player of the match: Chris Gayle (Somerset)
Kent Spitfires won the toss and elected to bat				County Ground, Taunton; Umpires: Nigel Cowley and Stephen Gale; Player of the match: Chris Gayle (Somerset)

==== June ====
4 June	Hampshire (H); 172/3 (20 overs)	v	Middlesex; 153/6 (20 overs)	Hampshire won by 19 runs
18:30 (D/N); Scorecard	Hampshire (H); 172/3 (20 overs)	v	Middlesex; 153/6 (20 overs)	The Rose Bowl, Southampton; Umpires: Mark Benson and Martin Saggers; Player of the match: Owais Shah (Hampshire)
18:30 (D/N); Scorecard	Owais Shah 58* (33); Neil Dexter 2/25 (4 overs)		James Franklin 31 (18); Yasir Arafat 2/21 (4 overs)	The Rose Bowl, Southampton; Umpires: Mark Benson and Martin Saggers; Player of the match: Owais Shah (Hampshire)
Hampshire won the toss and elected to bat				The Rose Bowl, Southampton; Umpires: Mark Benson and Martin Saggers; Player of the match: Owais Shah (Hampshire)

5 June	Kent Spitfires (H); 156/6 (20 overs)	v	Gloucestershire; 157/1 (17.2 overs)	Gloucestershire won by 9 wickets
17:30; Scorecard	Kent Spitfires (H); 156/6 (20 overs)	v	Gloucestershire; 157/1 (17.2 overs)	County Cricket Ground, Beckenham; Umpires: Martin Bodenham and Ben Debenham; Player of the match: Benny Howell (Gloucestershire)
17:30; Scorecard	Daniel Bell-Drummond 31 (24); Benny Howell 3/18 (4 overs)		Michael Klinger 69* (51); Mitchell Claydon 1/21 (2.2 overs)	County Cricket Ground, Beckenham; Umpires: Martin Bodenham and Ben Debenham; Player of the match: Benny Howell (Gloucestershire)
Kent Spitfires won the toss and elected to bat				County Cricket Ground, Beckenham; Umpires: Martin Bodenham and Ben Debenham; Player of the match: Benny Howell (Gloucestershire)

5 June	Hampshire; 167/3 (20 overs)	v	Somerset (H); 173/2 (18.3 overs)	Somerset won by 8 wickets
17:30; Scorecard	Hampshire; 167/3 (20 overs)	v	Somerset (H); 173/2 (18.3 overs)	County Cricket Ground, Taunton; Umpires: Mike Burns and Jeremy Lloyds; Player of the match: Chris Gayle (Somerset)
17:30; Scorecard	James Vince 64* (53); Jim Allenby 1/11 (3 overs)		Chris Gayle 85* (49); Fidel Edwards 1/20 (4 overs)	County Cricket Ground, Taunton; Umpires: Mike Burns and Jeremy Lloyds; Player of the match: Chris Gayle (Somerset)
Hampshire won the toss and elected to bat				County Cricket Ground, Taunton; Umpires: Mike Burns and Jeremy Lloyds; Player of the match: Chris Gayle (Somerset)

5 June	Glamorgan (H); 169/5 (20 overs)	v	Middlesex; 165/5 (20 overs)	Glamorgan won by 4 runs
18:30 (D/N); Scorecard	Glamorgan (H); 169/5 (20 overs)	v	Middlesex; 165/5 (20 overs)	Sophia Gardens, Cardiff; Umpires: Tim Robinson and Jeff Evans; Player of the match: Craig Meschede (Glamorgan)
18:30 (D/N); Scorecard	Jacques Rudolph 60 (43); Neil Dexter 2/22 (4 overs)		Dawid Malan 70 (54); Craig Meschede 2/14 (2 overs)	Sophia Gardens, Cardiff; Umpires: Tim Robinson and Jeff Evans; Player of the match: Craig Meschede (Glamorgan)
Glamorgan won the toss and elected to bat				Sophia Gardens, Cardiff; Umpires: Tim Robinson and Jeff Evans; Player of the match: Craig Meschede (Glamorgan)

5 June	Surrey (H); 169/8 (20 overs)	v	Essex Eagles; 170/4 (19.2 overs)	Essex Eagles won by 6 wickets
18:30 (D/N); Scorecard	Surrey (H); 169/8 (20 overs)	v	Essex Eagles; 170/4 (19.2 overs)	The Oval, London; Umpires: Steve Garratt and David Millns; Player of the match: Ravi Bopara (Essex Eagles)
18:30 (D/N); Scorecard	Kumar Sangakkara 58 (38); Ravi Bopara 3/18 (4 overs)		Ravi Bopara 57 (48); Matt Dunn 3/34 (4 overs)	The Oval, London; Umpires: Steve Garratt and David Millns; Player of the match: Ravi Bopara (Essex Eagles)
Surrey won the toss and elected to bat				The Oval, London; Umpires: Steve Garratt and David Millns; Player of the match: Ravi Bopara (Essex Eagles)

11 June	Essex Eagles (H); 181 (20 overs)	v	Gloucestershire; 163/7 (20 overs)	Essex Eagles won by 18 runs
19:00 (D/N); Scorecard	Essex Eagles (H); 181 (20 overs)	v	Gloucestershire; 163/7 (20 overs)	County Ground, Chelmsford; Umpires: Steve Garratt and Graham Lloyd; Player of the match: Michael Klinger (Gloucestershire)
19:00 (D/N); Scorecard	Mark Pettini 68 (44); Tom Smith 3/26 (4 overs)		Michael Klinger 104* (64); Graham Napier 3/30 (4 overs)	County Ground, Chelmsford; Umpires: Steve Garratt and Graham Lloyd; Player of the match: Michael Klinger (Gloucestershire)
Gloucestershire won the toss and elected to field				County Ground, Chelmsford; Umpires: Steve Garratt and Graham Lloyd; Player of the match: Michael Klinger (Gloucestershire)

12 June	Glamorgan; 191/3 (20 overs)	v	Gloucestershire (H); 172/6 (20 overs)	Glamorgan won by 19 runs
17:30; Scorecard	Glamorgan; 191/3 (20 overs)	v	Gloucestershire (H); 172/6 (20 overs)	County Ground, Bristol; Umpires: Stephen Gale and Alex Wharf; Player of the match: Jacques Rudolph (Glamorgan)
17:30; Scorecard	Jacques Rudolph 101* (71); Benny Howell 2/24 (4 overs)		Michael Klinger 104* (63); Michael Hogan 2/24 (4 overs)	County Ground, Bristol; Umpires: Stephen Gale and Alex Wharf; Player of the match: Jacques Rudolph (Glamorgan)
Gloucestershire won the toss and elected to field				County Ground, Bristol; Umpires: Stephen Gale and Alex Wharf; Player of the match: Jacques Rudolph (Glamorgan)

12 June	Somerset (H)	v	Surrey	Match abandoned
17:30; Scorecard	Somerset (H)	v	Surrey	County Ground, Taunton; Umpires: Neil Mallender and David Millns

12 June	Kent Spitfires (H); 183/5 (18 overs)	v	Hampshire; 187/4 (17.5 overs)	Hampshire won by 6 wickets (D/L method)
19:00 (D/N); Scorecard	Kent Spitfires (H); 183/5 (18 overs)	v	Hampshire; 187/4 (17.5 overs)	St Lawrence Ground, Canterbury; Umpires: Neil Bainton and Graham Lloyd; Player of the match: James Vince (Hampshire)
19:00 (D/N); Scorecard	Sam Northeast 54 (33); Fidel Edwards 2/41 (4 overs)		James Vince 99* (57); Matt Coles 2/44 (4 overs)	St Lawrence Ground, Canterbury; Umpires: Neil Bainton and Graham Lloyd; Player of the match: James Vince (Hampshire)
Kent Spitfires won the toss and elected to bat; Match reduced to 18 overs per-side; Ryan Davies (Kent Spitfires) made his T20 debut				St Lawrence Ground, Canterbury; Umpires: Neil Bainton and Graham Lloyd; Player of the match: James Vince (Hampshire)

12 June	Sussex Sharks (H); 140/9 (20 overs)	v	Essex Eagles; 144/3 (16.4 overs)	Essex Eagles won by 7 wickets
19:00 (D/N); Scorecard	Sussex Sharks (H); 140/9 (20 overs)	v	Essex Eagles; 144/3 (16.4 overs)	County Ground, Hove; Umpires: Martin Bodenham and Nigel Cowley; Player of the match: Tom Westley (Essex Eagles)
19:00 (D/N); Scorecard	Mahela Jayawardene 53 (41); Shaun Tait 3/29 (4 overs)		Mark Pettini 48 (36); Tymal Mills 1/24 (4 overs)	County Ground, Hove; Umpires: Martin Bodenham and Nigel Cowley; Player of the match: Tom Westley (Essex Eagles)
Essex Eagles won the toss and elected to field				County Ground, Hove; Umpires: Martin Bodenham and Nigel Cowley; Player of the match: Tom Westley (Essex Eagles)

13 June	Somerset; 159/5 (20 overs)	v	Glamorgan (H); 43/1 (6 overs)	Glamorgan won by 2 runs (D/L method)
14:30; Scorecard	Somerset; 159/5 (20 overs)	v	Glamorgan (H); 43/1 (6 overs)	Sophia Gardens, Cardiff; Umpires: Neil Mallender and David Millns; Player of the match: Tom Cooper (Somerset)
14:30; Scorecard	Tom Cooper 84* (40); Wayne Parnell 2/16 (4 overs)		Craig Meschede 18 (8); Sohail Tanvir 1/4 (2 overs)	Sophia Gardens, Cardiff; Umpires: Neil Mallender and David Millns; Player of the match: Tom Cooper (Somerset)
Glamorgan won the toss and elected to field				Sophia Gardens, Cardiff; Umpires: Neil Mallender and David Millns; Player of the match: Tom Cooper (Somerset)

14 June	Gloucestershire; 214/4 (20 overs)	v	Middlesex (H); 171 (19.3 overs)	Gloucestershire won by 43 runs
14:30; Scorecard	Gloucestershire; 214/4 (20 overs)	v	Middlesex (H); 171 (19.3 overs)	Old Deer Park, Richmond; Umpires: Martin Bodenham and Graham Lloyd; Player of the match: Ian Cockbain (Gloucestershire)
14:30; Scorecard	Ian Cockbain 75 (39); James Harris 1/40 (4 overs)		John Simpson 74 (49); David Payne 5/24 (3.3 overs)	Old Deer Park, Richmond; Umpires: Martin Bodenham and Graham Lloyd; Player of the match: Ian Cockbain (Gloucestershire)
Middlesex won the toss and elected to field; Nick Gubbins (Middlesex) made his T20 debut				Old Deer Park, Richmond; Umpires: Martin Bodenham and Graham Lloyd; Player of the match: Ian Cockbain (Gloucestershire)

14 June	Sussex Sharks (H); 141/7 (18.4 overs)	v	Surrey	No result
14:30; Scorecard	Sussex Sharks (H); 141/7 (18.4 overs)	v	Surrey	Arundel Castle Cricket Ground, Arundel; Umpires: Jeremy Lloyds and Alex Wharf
14:30; Scorecard	Mahela Jayawardene 43 (28); Moisés Henriques 3/23 (4 overs)			Arundel Castle Cricket Ground, Arundel; Umpires: Jeremy Lloyds and Alex Wharf
Sussex Sharks won the toss and elected to bat; Match abandoned due to a collision between Surrey players Rory Burns and Moisés Henriques both of whom needed urgent medical attention.				Arundel Castle Cricket Ground, Arundel; Umpires: Jeremy Lloyds and Alex Wharf

18 June	Hampshire; 199/5 (20 overs)	v	Middlesex (H); 178/9 (20 overs)	Hampshire won by 21 runs
18:15 (D/N); Scorecard	Hampshire; 199/5 (20 overs)	v	Middlesex (H); 178/9 (20 overs)	Lord's, London; Umpires: Martin Bodenham and Graham Lloyd; Player of the match: Owais Shah (Hampshire)
18:15 (D/N); Scorecard	Michael Carberry 72* (44); Kyle Abbott 2/50 (4 overs)		Paul Stirling 54 (27); Will Smith 2/19 (4 overs)	Lord's, London; Umpires: Martin Bodenham and Graham Lloyd; Player of the match: Owais Shah (Hampshire)
Hampshire won the toss and elected to bat				Lord's, London; Umpires: Martin Bodenham and Graham Lloyd; Player of the match: Owais Shah (Hampshire)

18 June	Essex Eagles; 173/6 (20 overs)	v	Kent Spitfires (H); 174/4 (19.1 overs)	Kent Spitfires won by 6 wickets
18:30 (D/N); Scorecard	Essex Eagles; 173/6 (20 overs)	v	Kent Spitfires (H); 174/4 (19.1 overs)	St Lawrence Ground, Canterbury; Umpires: Neil Bainton and Nigel Cowley; Player of the match: Sam Northeast (Kent Spitfires)
18:30 (D/N); Scorecard	Mark Pettini 56 (45); Matt Coles 2/28 (4 overs)		Sam Northeast 90 (52); Graham Napier 1/17 (2 overs)	St Lawrence Ground, Canterbury; Umpires: Neil Bainton and Nigel Cowley; Player of the match: Sam Northeast (Kent Spitfires)
Kent Spitfires won the toss and elected to field; Ivan Thomas (Kent Spitfires) made his T20 debut				St Lawrence Ground, Canterbury; Umpires: Neil Bainton and Nigel Cowley; Player of the match: Sam Northeast (Kent Spitfires)

19 June	Gloucestershire (H); 165/8 (20 overs)	v	Somerset; 166/5 (19.4 overs)	Somerset won by 5 wickets
17:30; Scorecard	Gloucestershire (H); 165/8 (20 overs)	v	Somerset; 166/5 (19.4 overs)	County Ground, Bristol; Umpires: Paul Baldwin and Mark Benson; Player of the match: Johann Myburgh (Somerset)
17:30; Scorecard	Michael Klinger 44 (39); Lewis Gregory 2/37 (4 overs)		Johann Myburgh 63 (50); Tom Smith 2/23 (4 overs)	County Ground, Bristol; Umpires: Paul Baldwin and Mark Benson; Player of the match: Johann Myburgh (Somerset)
Gloucestershire won the toss and elected to bat				County Ground, Bristol; Umpires: Paul Baldwin and Mark Benson; Player of the match: Johann Myburgh (Somerset)

19 June	Kent Spitfires; 231/7 (20 overs)	v	Surrey (H); 177 (20 overs)	Kent Spitfires won by 54 runs
18:30 (D/N); Scorecard	Kent Spitfires; 231/7 (20 overs)	v	Surrey (H); 177 (20 overs)	The Oval, London; Umpires: Rob Bailey and Jeremy Lloyds; Player of the match: Darren Stevens (Kent Spitfires)
18:30 (D/N); Scorecard	Darren Stevens 90 (39); Tim Linley 4/45 (4 overs)		Gary Wilson 55 (36); Darren Stevens 4/39 (4 overs)	The Oval, London; Umpires: Rob Bailey and Jeremy Lloyds; Player of the match: Darren Stevens (Kent Spitfires)
Kent Spitfires won the toss and elected to bat; Sam Curran (Surrey) made his T20 debut				The Oval, London; Umpires: Rob Bailey and Jeremy Lloyds; Player of the match: Darren Stevens (Kent Spitfires)

19 June	Essex Eagles (H); 187/7 (20 overs)	v	Glamorgan; 171 (19.4 overs)	Essex Eagles won by 16 runs
19:00 (D/N); Scorecard	Essex Eagles (H); 187/7 (20 overs)	v	Glamorgan; 171 (19.4 overs)	County Ground, Chelmsford; Umpires: Neil Bainton and Alex Wharf; Player of the match: Ravi Bopara (Essex Eagles)
19:00 (D/N); Scorecard	Ravi Bopara 52 (40); Michael Hogan 3/33 (4 overs)		Colin Ingram 70 (46); Ravi Bopara 3/25 (4 overs)	County Ground, Chelmsford; Umpires: Neil Bainton and Alex Wharf; Player of the match: Ravi Bopara (Essex Eagles)
Glamorgan won the toss and elected to field				County Ground, Chelmsford; Umpires: Neil Bainton and Alex Wharf; Player of the match: Ravi Bopara (Essex Eagles)

19 June	Hampshire (H); 157/6 (20 overs)	v	Sussex Sharks; 158/3 (18.4 overs)	Sussex Sharks won by 7 wickets
19:00 (D/N); Scorecard	Hampshire (H); 157/6 (20 overs)	v	Sussex Sharks; 158/3 (18.4 overs)	The Rose Bowl, Southampton; Umpires: Ben Debenham and Steve O'Shaughnessy; Player of the match: Craig Cachopa (Sussex Sharks)
19:00 (D/N); Scorecard	James Vince 41 (24); Oliver Robinson 2/37 (4 overs)		Craig Cachopa 89* (54); Chris Wood 2/27 (3 overs)	The Rose Bowl, Southampton; Umpires: Ben Debenham and Steve O'Shaughnessy; Player of the match: Craig Cachopa (Sussex Sharks)
Sussex Sharks won the toss and elected to field				The Rose Bowl, Southampton; Umpires: Ben Debenham and Steve O'Shaughnessy; Player of the match: Craig Cachopa (Sussex Sharks)

21 June	Glamorgan (H); 115/9 (20 overs)	v	Sussex Sharks; 116/0 (12.2 overs)	Sussex Sharks won by 10 wickets
14:30; Scorecard	Glamorgan (H); 115/9 (20 overs)	v	Sussex Sharks; 116/0 (12.2 overs)	Sophia Gardens, Cardiff; Umpires: Mark Benson and Russell Evans; Player of the match: Oliver Robinson (Sussex Sharks)
14:30; Scorecard	Chris Cooke 45 (42); Oliver Robinson 3/16 (4 overs)		Luke Wright 57* (36); Craig Meschede 0/4 (1 overs)	Sophia Gardens, Cardiff; Umpires: Mark Benson and Russell Evans; Player of the match: Oliver Robinson (Sussex Sharks)
Sussex Sharks won the toss and elected to field				Sophia Gardens, Cardiff; Umpires: Mark Benson and Russell Evans; Player of the match: Oliver Robinson (Sussex Sharks)

26 June	Gloucestershire (H); 185/4 (20 overs)	v	Sussex Sharks; 188/7 (19.5 overs)	Sussex Sharks won by 3 wickets
17:30; Scorecard	Gloucestershire (H); 185/4 (20 overs)	v	Sussex Sharks; 188/7 (19.5 overs)	County Ground, Bristol; Umpires: Nick Cook and Russell Evans; Player of the match: Luke Wright (Sussex Sharks)
17:30; Scorecard	Michael Klinger 61 (51); Tymal Mills 2/31 (4 overs)		Luke Wright 111* (56); Tom Smith 2/32 (4 overs)	County Ground, Bristol; Umpires: Nick Cook and Russell Evans; Player of the match: Luke Wright (Sussex Sharks)
Gloucestershire won the toss and elected to bat				County Ground, Bristol; Umpires: Nick Cook and Russell Evans; Player of the match: Luke Wright (Sussex Sharks)

26 June	Middlesex (H); 171/7 (20 overs)	v	Somerset; 177/1 (18 overs)	Somerset won by 9 wickets
17:30; Scorecard	Middlesex (H); 171/7 (20 overs)	v	Somerset; 177/1 (18 overs)	Uxbridge Cricket Club Ground, Uxbridge; Umpires: Jeremy Lloyds and Neil Bainton; Player of the match: Jim Allenby (Somerset)
17:30; Scorecard	John Simpson 84* (51); Tim Groenewald 3/27 (4 overs)		Jim Allenby 89* (51); James Franklin 1/28 (3 overs)	Uxbridge Cricket Club Ground, Uxbridge; Umpires: Jeremy Lloyds and Neil Bainton; Player of the match: Jim Allenby (Somerset)
Middlesex won the toss and elected to bat				Uxbridge Cricket Club Ground, Uxbridge; Umpires: Jeremy Lloyds and Neil Bainton; Player of the match: Jim Allenby (Somerset)

26 June	Surrey; 146/8 (20 overs)	v	Glamorgan (H); 127 (19.3 overs)	Surrey won by 19 runs
18:30 (D/N); Scorecard	Surrey; 146/8 (20 overs)	v	Glamorgan (H); 127 (19.3 overs)	Sophia Gardens, Cardiff; Umpires: Martin Bodenham and Jeff Evans; Player of the match: Jason Roy (Surrey)
18:30 (D/N); Scorecard	Jason Roy 61 (47); Dean Cosker 4/25 (4 overs)		Craig Meschede 31 (27); Azhar Mahmood 3/14 (4 overs)	Sophia Gardens, Cardiff; Umpires: Martin Bodenham and Jeff Evans; Player of the match: Jason Roy (Surrey)
Glamorgan won the toss and elected to field				Sophia Gardens, Cardiff; Umpires: Martin Bodenham and Jeff Evans; Player of the match: Jason Roy (Surrey)

26 June	Essex Eagles (H); 212/5 (20 overs)	v	Hampshire; 134 (18.3 overs)	Essex Eagles won by 78 runs
19:00 (D/N); Scorecard	Essex Eagles (H); 212/5 (20 overs)	v	Hampshire; 134 (18.3 overs)	County Ground, Chelmsford; Umpires: Peter Hartley and Martin Saggers; Player of the match: Jesse Ryder (Essex Eagles)
19:00 (D/N); Scorecard	Jesse Ryder 107* (55); Chris Wood 1/29 (4 overs)		Owais Shah 26 (20); Ravi Bopara 3/23 (4 overs)	County Ground, Chelmsford; Umpires: Peter Hartley and Martin Saggers; Player of the match: Jesse Ryder (Essex Eagles)
Hampshire won the toss and elected to field				County Ground, Chelmsford; Umpires: Peter Hartley and Martin Saggers; Player of the match: Jesse Ryder (Essex Eagles)

28 June	Glamorgan; 170/4 (20 overs)	v	Somerset (H); 167/8 (20 overs)	Glamorgan won by 3 runs
14:30; Scorecard	Glamorgan; 170/4 (20 overs)	v	Somerset (H); 167/8 (20 overs)	County Cricket Ground, Taunton; Umpires: Martin Bodenham and Jeff Evans; Player of the match: Colin Ingram (Glamorgan)
14:30; Scorecard	Colin Ingram 96 (62); Jim Allenby 1/18 (2 overs)		Peter Trego 39 (31); Wayne Parnell 2/33 (4 overs)	County Cricket Ground, Taunton; Umpires: Martin Bodenham and Jeff Evans; Player of the match: Colin Ingram (Glamorgan)
Somerset won the toss and elected to field				County Cricket Ground, Taunton; Umpires: Martin Bodenham and Jeff Evans; Player of the match: Colin Ingram (Glamorgan)

==== July ====
1 July	Gloucestershire; 154/5 (20 overs)	v	Surrey (H); 155/6 (20 overs)	Surrey won by 4 wickets
18:30 (D/N); Scorecard	Gloucestershire; 154/5 (20 overs)	v	Surrey (H); 155/6 (20 overs)	The Oval, London; Umpires: Richard Kettleborough and Neil Bainton; Player of the match: Azhar Mahmood (Surrey)
18:30 (D/N); Scorecard	Peter Handscomb 39 (36); Matt Dunn 2/15 (2 overs)		Kumar Sangakkara 34 (33); Tom Smith 2/24 (4 overs)	The Oval, London; Umpires: Richard Kettleborough and Neil Bainton; Player of the match: Azhar Mahmood (Surrey)
Gloucestershire won the toss and elected to bat				The Oval, London; Umpires: Richard Kettleborough and Neil Bainton; Player of the match: Azhar Mahmood (Surrey)

2 July	Middlesex (H); 133/8 (20 overs)	v	Sussex Sharks; 134/3 (15.2 overs)	Sussex Sharks won by 7 wickets
18:15 (D/N); Scorecard	Middlesex (H); 133/8 (20 overs)	v	Sussex Sharks; 134/3 (15.2 overs)	Lord's, London; Umpires: Richard Kettleborough and Steve Garratt; Player of the match: Tymal Mills (Sussex Sharks)
18:15 (D/N); Scorecard	Eoin Morgan 27 (29); Tymal Mills 4/22 (4 overs)		Luke Wright 47 (33); Mitchell McClenaghan 3/24 (4 overs)	Lord's, London; Umpires: Richard Kettleborough and Steve Garratt; Player of the match: Tymal Mills (Sussex Sharks)
Sussex Sharks won the toss and elected to field				Lord's, London; Umpires: Richard Kettleborough and Steve Garratt; Player of the match: Tymal Mills (Sussex Sharks)

3 July	Somerset (H); 174/6 (20 overs)	v	Gloucestershire; 178/2 (19.2 overs)	Gloucestershire won by 8 wickets
17:30; Scorecard	Somerset (H); 174/6 (20 overs)	v	Gloucestershire; 178/2 (19.2 overs)	County Ground, Taunton; Umpires: Mike Burns and Alex Wharf; Player of the match: Hamish Marshall (Gloucestershire)
17:30; Scorecard	Luke Ronchi 49 (23); Benny Howell 2/34 (4 overs)		Hamish Marshall 93 (53); Jamie Overton 1/35 (4 overs)	County Ground, Taunton; Umpires: Mike Burns and Alex Wharf; Player of the match: Hamish Marshall (Gloucestershire)
Somerset won the toss and chose to bat				County Ground, Taunton; Umpires: Mike Burns and Alex Wharf; Player of the match: Hamish Marshall (Gloucestershire)

3 July	Surrey (H); 106/2 (14.4 overs)	v	Middlesex; 105/9 (20 overs)	Surrey won by 8 wickets
18:30 (D/N); Scorecard	Surrey (H); 106/2 (14.4 overs)	v	Middlesex; 105/9 (20 overs)	The Oval, London; Umpires: Paul Baldwin and Steve O'Shaughnessy; Player of the match: Zafar Ansari (Surrey)
18:30 (D/N); Scorecard	Kumar Sangakkara 40* (28); Harry Podmore 1/14 (2 overs)		Dawid Malan 40 (35); Zafar Ansari 3/17 (4 overs)	The Oval, London; Umpires: Paul Baldwin and Steve O'Shaughnessy; Player of the match: Zafar Ansari (Surrey)
Middlesex won the toss and chose to bat				The Oval, London; Umpires: Paul Baldwin and Steve O'Shaughnessy; Player of the match: Zafar Ansari (Surrey)

3 July	Hampshire (H); 158/6 (20 overs)	v	Glamorgan; 181/7 (20 overs)	Glamorgan won by 23 runs
19:00 (D/N); Scorecard	Hampshire (H); 158/6 (20 overs)	v	Glamorgan; 181/7 (20 overs)	Rose Bowl, Southampton; Umpires: Rob Bailey and Steve Garratt; Player of the match: Jacques Rudolph (Glamorgan)
19:00 (D/N); Scorecard	Michael Carberry 70 (46); Jacques Rudolph 2/8 (2 overs)		Jacques Rudolph 77 (45); Gareth Berg 3/34 (4 overs)	Rose Bowl, Southampton; Umpires: Rob Bailey and Steve Garratt; Player of the match: Jacques Rudolph (Glamorgan)
Glamorgan won the toss and chose to bat				Rose Bowl, Southampton; Umpires: Rob Bailey and Steve Garratt; Player of the match: Jacques Rudolph (Glamorgan)

3 July	Sussex Sharks (H); 136/8 (20 overs)	v	Kent Spitfires; 137/3 (14.2 overs)	Kent Spitfires won by 7 wickets
19:00 (D/N); Scorecard	Sussex Sharks (H); 136/8 (20 overs)	v	Kent Spitfires; 137/3 (14.2 overs)	County Ground, Hove; Umpires: Peter Hartley and David Millns; Player of the match: Alex Blake (Kent Spitfires)
19:00 (D/N); Scorecard	Matt Machan 39 (32); Mitchell Claydon 3/40 (4 overs)		Alex Blake 52* (32); Ollie Robinson 2/22 (2.2 overs)	County Ground, Hove; Umpires: Peter Hartley and David Millns; Player of the match: Alex Blake (Kent Spitfires)
Kent Spitfires won the toss and chose to field				County Ground, Hove; Umpires: Peter Hartley and David Millns; Player of the match: Alex Blake (Kent Spitfires)

10 July	Middlesex (H); 110/4 (17 overs)	v	Essex Eagles; 109 (18 overs)	Middlesex won by 6 wickets
17:30; Scorecard	Middlesex (H); 110/4 (17 overs)	v	Essex Eagles; 109 (18 overs)	Old Deer Park, Richmond; Umpires: Steve Garratt and Neil Mallender; Player of the match: Steven Finn (Middlesex)
17:30; Scorecard	Nick Gubbins 22 (19); Ravi Bopara 3/12 (4 overs)		James Foster 33 (22); Steven Finn 4/28 (4 overs)	Old Deer Park, Richmond; Umpires: Steve Garratt and Neil Mallender; Player of the match: Steven Finn (Middlesex)
Essex Eagles won the toss and chose to bat; George Scott (Middlesex) made his T20 debut				Old Deer Park, Richmond; Umpires: Steve Garratt and Neil Mallender; Player of the match: Steven Finn (Middlesex)

10 July	Hampshire (H); 186/5 (20 overs)	v	Surrey; 157/9 (20 overs)	Hampshire won by 29 runs
19:00 (D/N); Scorecard	Hampshire (H); 186/5 (20 overs)	v	Surrey; 157/9 (20 overs)	Rose Bowl, Southampton; Umpires: Mike Burns and Steve O'Shaughnessy; Player of the match: Adam Wheater (Hampshire)
19:00 (D/N); Scorecard	Adam Wheater 78 (49); Azhar Mahmood 2/21 (4 overs)		Azhar Mahmood 34 (24); Danny Briggs 3/21 (4 overs)	Rose Bowl, Southampton; Umpires: Mike Burns and Steve O'Shaughnessy; Player of the match: Adam Wheater (Hampshire)
Surrey won the toss and chose to field; Mason Crane (Hampshire) made his T20 debut				Rose Bowl, Southampton; Umpires: Mike Burns and Steve O'Shaughnessy; Player of the match: Adam Wheater (Hampshire)

10 July	Kent Spitfires (H); 173/6 (20 overs)	v	Somerset; 151/9 (20 overs)	Kent Spitfires won by 22 runs
19:00 (D/N); Scorecard	Kent Spitfires (H); 173/6 (20 overs)	v	Somerset; 151/9 (20 overs)	St. Lawrence Ground, Canterbury; Umpires: Russell Evans and Alex Wharf; Player of the match: Daniel Bell-Drummond (Kent Spitfires)
19:00 (D/N); Scorecard	Daniel Bell-Drummond 77 (51); Alfonso Thomas 3/28 (4 overs)		Jamie Overton 31 (19); Calum Haggett 2/12 (2 overs)	St. Lawrence Ground, Canterbury; Umpires: Russell Evans and Alex Wharf; Player of the match: Daniel Bell-Drummond (Kent Spitfires)
Somerset won the toss and chose to field				St. Lawrence Ground, Canterbury; Umpires: Russell Evans and Alex Wharf; Player of the match: Daniel Bell-Drummond (Kent Spitfires)

10 July	Sussex Sharks (H); 165/2 (14.5 overs)	v	Glamorgan; 164/7 (20 overs)	Sussex Sharks won by 8 wickets
19:00 (D/N); Scorecard	Sussex Sharks (H); 165/2 (14.5 overs)	v	Glamorgan; 164/7 (20 overs)	County Ground, Hove; Umpires: Ian Blackwell and Jeremy Lloyds; Player of the match: Luke Wright (Sussex Sharks)
19:00 (D/N); Scorecard	Luke Wright 92* (46); Graham Wagg 2/32 (3 overs)		Ben Wright 63* (46); Tymal Mills 3/34 (4 overs)	County Ground, Hove; Umpires: Ian Blackwell and Jeremy Lloyds; Player of the match: Luke Wright (Sussex Sharks)
Glamorgan won the toss and chose to bat; Aneurin Donald (Glamorgan) made his T20 debut				County Ground, Hove; Umpires: Ian Blackwell and Jeremy Lloyds; Player of the match: Luke Wright (Sussex Sharks)

12 July	Gloucestershire (H); 166/7 (20 overs)	v	Kent Spitfires; 170/7 (19.4 overs)	Kent Spitfires won by 3 wickets
14:30; Scorecard	Gloucestershire (H); 166/7 (20 overs)	v	Kent Spitfires; 170/7 (19.4 overs)	College Ground, Cheltenham; Umpires: Jeff Evans and Jeremy Lloyds; Player of the match: Alex Blake (Kent Spitfires)
14:30; Scorecard	Michael Klinger 75 (50); Mitchell Claydon 3/27 (4 overs)		Alex Blake 59* (24); Craig Miles 3/27 (4 overs)	College Ground, Cheltenham; Umpires: Jeff Evans and Jeremy Lloyds; Player of the match: Alex Blake (Kent Spitfires)
Kent Spitfires won the toss and chose to field				College Ground, Cheltenham; Umpires: Jeff Evans and Jeremy Lloyds; Player of the match: Alex Blake (Kent Spitfires)

14 July	Gloucestershire (H); 117/5 (18.4 overs)	v	Hampshire; 116 (20 overs)	Gloucestershire won by 5 wickets
14:30; Scorecard	Gloucestershire (H); 117/5 (18.4 overs)	v	Hampshire; 116 (20 overs)	College Ground, Cheltenham; Umpires: Jeremy Lloyds and Martin Saggers; Player of the match: Geraint Jones (Gloucestershire)
14:30; Scorecard	Geraint Jones 40 (30); James Vince 1/21 (3 overs)		James Vince 32 (29); Craig Miles 3/25 (4 overs)	College Ground, Cheltenham; Umpires: Jeremy Lloyds and Martin Saggers; Player of the match: Geraint Jones (Gloucestershire)
Gloucestershire won the toss and chose to field; Sean Terry (Hampshire) made his T20 debut				College Ground, Cheltenham; Umpires: Jeremy Lloyds and Martin Saggers; Player of the match: Geraint Jones (Gloucestershire)

17 July	Kent Spitfires (H); 178/8 (20 overs)	v	Glamorgan; 179/7 (20 overs)	Glamorgan won by 1 run
17:30; Scorecard	Kent Spitfires (H); 178/8 (20 overs)	v	Glamorgan; 179/7 (20 overs)	Nevill Ground, Royal Tunbridge Wells; Umpires: Nick Cook and Paul Pollard; Player of the match: Graham Wagg (Glamorgan)
17:30; Scorecard	Joe Denly 70 (37); Michael Hogan 3/40 (4 overs)		Graham Wagg 53* (28); Matt Hunn 3/30 (4 overs)	Nevill Ground, Royal Tunbridge Wells; Umpires: Nick Cook and Paul Pollard; Player of the match: Graham Wagg (Glamorgan)
Glamorgan won the toss and chose to bat; Matt Hunn (Kent Spitfires) made his T20 debut				Nevill Ground, Royal Tunbridge Wells; Umpires: Nick Cook and Paul Pollard; Player of the match: Graham Wagg (Glamorgan)

17 July	Surrey (H); 208/1 (20 overs)	v	Somerset; 170/7 (20 overs)	Surrey won by 38 runs
18:30 (D/N); Scorecard	Surrey (H); 208/1 (20 overs)	v	Somerset; 170/7 (20 overs)	The Oval, London; Umpires: Mike Burns and Steve Garratt; Player of the match: Jason Roy (Surrey)
18:30 (D/N); Scorecard	Jason Roy 122* (65); Max Waller 1/26 (3 overs)		James Hildreth 51 (43); Sam Curran 2/37 (3 overs)	The Oval, London; Umpires: Mike Burns and Steve Garratt; Player of the match: Jason Roy (Surrey)
Surrey won the toss and chose to bat				The Oval, London; Umpires: Mike Burns and Steve Garratt; Player of the match: Jason Roy (Surrey)

17 July	Essex Eagles (H); 151/6 (18.4 overs)	v	Middlesex; 150/5 (20 overs)	Essex Eagles won by 4 wickets
19:00 (D/N); Scorecard	Essex Eagles (H); 151/6 (18.4 overs)	v	Middlesex; 150/5 (20 overs)	County Ground, Chelmsford; Umpires: Neil Bainton and Steve O'Shaughnessy; Player of the match: Jesse Ryder (Essex Eagles)
19:00 (D/N); Scorecard	Jesse Ryder 59 (27); Harry Podmore 2/28 (3 overs)		Nick Gubbins 46 (34); Shaun Tait 2/19 (4 overs)	County Ground, Chelmsford; Umpires: Neil Bainton and Steve O'Shaughnessy; Player of the match: Jesse Ryder (Essex Eagles)
Middlesex won the toss and chose to bat				County Ground, Chelmsford; Umpires: Neil Bainton and Steve O'Shaughnessy; Player of the match: Jesse Ryder (Essex Eagles)

17 July	Sussex Sharks (H); 200/6 (20 overs)	v	Hampshire; 204/3 (20 overs)	Hampshire won by 4 runs
19:00 (D/N); Scorecard	Sussex Sharks (H); 200/6 (20 overs)	v	Hampshire; 204/3 (20 overs)	County Ground, Hove; Umpires: Jeff Evans and Stephen Gale; Player of the match: James Vince (Hampshire)
19:00 (D/N); Scorecard	Chris Nash 88 (56); Chris Wood 3/40 (4 overs)		James Vince 90* (62); Chris Nash 1/15 (2 overs)	County Ground, Hove; Umpires: Jeff Evans and Stephen Gale; Player of the match: James Vince (Hampshire)
Sussex won the toss and chose to field				County Ground, Hove; Umpires: Jeff Evans and Stephen Gale; Player of the match: James Vince (Hampshire)

23 July	Middlesex (H); 185/5 (20 overs)	v	Surrey; 142/9 (20 overs)	Middlesex won by 43 runs
18:15 (D/N); Scorecard	Middlesex (H); 185/5 (20 overs)	v	Surrey; 142/9 (20 overs)	Lord's, London; Umpires: Jeff Evans and Graham Lloyd; Player of the match: John Simpson (Middlesex)
18:15 (D/N); Scorecard	John Simpson 53 (40); Azhar Mahmood 2/40 (4 overs)		Kumar Sangakkara 32 (25); Neil Dexter 3/12 (4 overs)	Lord's, London; Umpires: Jeff Evans and Graham Lloyd; Player of the match: John Simpson (Middlesex)
Middlesex won the toss and chose to bat				Lord's, London; Umpires: Jeff Evans and Graham Lloyd; Player of the match: John Simpson (Middlesex)

23 July	Hampshire (H); 143/7 (20 overs)	v	Somerset; 137/8 (20 overs)	Hampshire won by 6 runs
18:30 (D/N); Scorecard	Hampshire (H); 143/7 (20 overs)	v	Somerset; 137/8 (20 overs)	Rose Bowl, Southampton; Umpires: Rob Bailey and Nick Cook; Player of the match: Yasir Arafat (Hampshire)
18:30 (D/N); Scorecard	Michael Carberry 57 (41); Max Waller 3/17 (4 overs)		Tom Cooper 27 (25); Yasir Arafat 4/37 (4 overs)	Rose Bowl, Southampton; Umpires: Rob Bailey and Nick Cook; Player of the match: Yasir Arafat (Hampshire)
Hampshire won the toss and chose to bat; Adam Hose (Somerset) made his T20 debut				Rose Bowl, Southampton; Umpires: Rob Bailey and Nick Cook; Player of the match: Yasir Arafat (Hampshire)

24 July	Somerset (H)	v	Middlesex	Match abandoned without a ball bowled
17:30; Scorecard	Somerset (H)	v	Middlesex	County Ground, Taunton; Umpires: Mike Burns and Nick Cook

24 July	Essex Eagles (H)	v	Kent Spitfires	Match abandoned without a ball bowled
18:30 (D/N); Scorecard	Essex Eagles (H)	v	Kent Spitfires	County Ground, Chelmsford; Umpires: Paul Baldwin and Richard Illingworth

24 July	Glamorgan (H); 45/1 (5 overs)	v	Gloucestershire; 51/2 (3.5 overs)	Gloucestershire won by 8 wickets
18:30 (D/N); Scorecard	Glamorgan (H); 45/1 (5 overs)	v	Gloucestershire; 51/2 (3.5 overs)	Sophia Gardens, Cardiff; Umpires: Jeff Evans and Russell Evans; Player of the match: Chris Dent (Gloucestershire)
18:30 (D/N); Scorecard	Colin Ingram 18 (8); Kieran Noema-Barnett 1/15 (1 over)		Chris Dent 28* (11); David Lloyd 2/13 (1 over)	Sophia Gardens, Cardiff; Umpires: Jeff Evans and Russell Evans; Player of the match: Chris Dent (Gloucestershire)
Gloucestershire won the toss and chose to field; Match limited to 5 overs per-side due to rain				Sophia Gardens, Cardiff; Umpires: Jeff Evans and Russell Evans; Player of the match: Chris Dent (Gloucestershire)

24 July	Surrey (H)	v	Sussex Sharks	Match abandoned without a ball bowled
18:30 (D/N); Scorecard	Surrey (H)	v	Sussex Sharks	The Oval, London; Umpires: Rob Bailey and David Millns

== Knockout stage ==
Quarter-finals
Sussex Sharks (H)	165/7 (20 ov)
Northamptonshire Steelbacks	166/6 (16 ov)
Birmingham Bears (H)	189/5 (20 ov)
Essex Eagles	165/6 (20 ov)
Worcestershire Rapids (H)	58/2 (8.1 ov)
Hampshire (D/L)	196/4 (20 ov)
Kent Spitfires (H)	142 (20 ov)
Lancashire Lightning	142/6 (20 ov)

Semifinals
Northamptonshire Steelbacks	135/5 (18 ov)
Birmingham Bears	131/6 (20 ov)
Hampshire	115 (19.5 ov)
Lancashire Lightning	119/4 (18.5 ov)

Final
Lancashire Lightning	166/7 (20.0 ov)
Northamptonshire Steelbacks	153/6 (20.0 ov)

=== Quarter-finals ===
12 August	Sussex Sharks; 165/7 (20 overs)	v	Northamptonshire Steelbacks; 166/3 (16 overs)	Northamptonshire Steelbacks won by 7 wickets
Scorecard	Sussex Sharks; 165/7 (20 overs)	v	Northamptonshire Steelbacks; 166/3 (16 overs)	County Ground, Hove; Umpires: Ian Gould and Peter Hartley; Player of the match: David Willey (Northamptonshire Steelbacks)
Scorecard	Chris Nash 53 (37); David Willey 3/27 (4 overs)		David Willey 100 (41); Will Beer 2/24 (4 overs)	County Ground, Hove; Umpires: Ian Gould and Peter Hartley; Player of the match: David Willey (Northamptonshire Steelbacks)
Northamptonshire won the toss and elected to field				County Ground, Hove; Umpires: Ian Gould and Peter Hartley; Player of the match: David Willey (Northamptonshire Steelbacks)

13 August	Birmingham Bears; 189/5 (20 overs)	v	Essex Eagles; 165/6 (20 overs)	Birmingham Bears won by 24 runs
Scorecard	Birmingham Bears; 189/5 (20 overs)	v	Essex Eagles; 165/6 (20 overs)	Edgbaston, Birmingham; Umpires: Richard Illingworth and Jeremy Lloyds; Player of the match: Chris Woakes (Birmingham Bears)
Scorecard	Laurie Evans 50 (31); Reece Topley 2/36 (4 overs)		Tom Westley 33 (27); Chris Woakes 1/22 (4 overs)	Edgbaston, Birmingham; Umpires: Richard Illingworth and Jeremy Lloyds; Player of the match: Chris Woakes (Birmingham Bears)
Essex won the toss and elected to field				Edgbaston, Birmingham; Umpires: Richard Illingworth and Jeremy Lloyds; Player of the match: Chris Woakes (Birmingham Bears)

14 August	Hampshire; 196/4 (20 overs)	v	Worcestershire Rapids; 58/2 (8.1 overs)	Hampshire won by 17 runs (D/L method)
Scorecard	Hampshire; 196/4 (20 overs)	v	Worcestershire Rapids; 58/2 (8.1 overs)	County Ground, Worcester; Umpires: Rob Bailey and Tim Robinson; Player of the match: James Vince (Hampshire)
Scorecard	James Vince 107* (65); Joe Leach 2/40 (4 overs)		DKH Mitchell 20* (21); CP Wood 1/10 (2 overs)	County Ground, Worcester; Umpires: Rob Bailey and Tim Robinson; Player of the match: James Vince (Hampshire)
Worcestershire Rapids won the toss and elected to field; Joe Clarke (Worcestershire Rapids) made his T20 debut				County Ground, Worcester; Umpires: Rob Bailey and Tim Robinson; Player of the match: James Vince (Hampshire)

15 August	Kent Spitfires; 142 (20 overs)	v	Lancashire Lightning; 142/6 (20 overs)	Match tied
Scorecard	Kent Spitfires; 142 (20 overs)	v	Lancashire Lightning; 142/6 (20 overs)	St Lawrence Ground, Canterbury; Umpires: Nick Cook and Michael Gough; Player of the match: Jos Buttler (Lancashire Lightning)
Scorecard	James Tredwell 31* (18 overs); Stephen Parry 3/31 (4 overs)		Ashwell Prince 62 (50); Matt Coles 3/22 (4 overs)	St Lawrence Ground, Canterbury; Umpires: Nick Cook and Michael Gough; Player of the match: Jos Buttler (Lancashire Lightning)
Lancashire Lightning won the toss and elected to field; Lancashire Lightning progress on fewest wickets lost				St Lawrence Ground, Canterbury; Umpires: Nick Cook and Michael Gough; Player of the match: Jos Buttler (Lancashire Lightning)

=== Semifinals ===
29 August	Birmingham Bears; 131/6 (20 overs)	v	Northamptonshire Steelbacks; 135/5 (18 overs)	Northamptonshire Steelbacks won by 5 wickets
11:00; Scorecard	Birmingham Bears; 131/6 (20 overs)	v	Northamptonshire Steelbacks; 135/5 (18 overs)	Edgbaston, Birmingham; Umpires: Richard Illingworth and Tim Robinson; Player of the match: Richard Levi (Northamptonshire Steelbacks)
11:00; Scorecard	Ateeq Javid 51* (50); David Willey 3/30 (4 overs)		Richard Levi 63* (46); Boyd Rankin 2/20 (4 overs)	Edgbaston, Birmingham; Umpires: Richard Illingworth and Tim Robinson; Player of the match: Richard Levi (Northamptonshire Steelbacks)
Northamptonshire Steelbacks won the toss and elected to field.				Edgbaston, Birmingham; Umpires: Richard Illingworth and Tim Robinson; Player of the match: Richard Levi (Northamptonshire Steelbacks)

29 August	Hampshire; 115 (19.5 overs)	v	Lancashire Lightning; 119/4 (18.5 overs)	Lancashire Lightning won by 6 wickets
14:30; Scorecard	Hampshire; 115 (19.5 overs)	v	Lancashire Lightning; 119/4 (18.5 overs)	Edgbaston, Birmingham; Umpires: Rob Bailey and Michael Gough; Player of the match: Stephen Parry (Lancashire Lightning)
14:30; Scorecard	James Vince 69 (60); Stephen Parry 3/21 (4 overs)		Karl Brown 45* (43); Danny Briggs 2/19 (4 overs)	Edgbaston, Birmingham; Umpires: Rob Bailey and Michael Gough; Player of the match: Stephen Parry (Lancashire Lightning)
Hampshire won the toss and elected to bat.; Gavin Griffiths (Lancashire Lightning) made his T20 debut				Edgbaston, Birmingham; Umpires: Rob Bailey and Michael Gough; Player of the match: Stephen Parry (Lancashire Lightning)

=== Final ===
29 August	Lancashire Lightning; 166/7 (20 overs)	v	Northamptonshire Steelbacks; 153/6 (20 overs)	Lancashire Lightning won by 13 runs
18:45; Scorecard	Lancashire Lightning; 166/7 (20 overs)	v	Northamptonshire Steelbacks; 153/6 (20 overs)	Edgbaston, Birmingham; Umpires: Michael Gough and Richard Illingworth; Player of the match: Alex Davies (Lancashire Lightning)
18:45; Scorecard	Alex Davies 47 (36); Shahid Afridi 3/14 (4 overs)		Josh Cobb 44* (37); Gavin Griffiths 2/23 (3 overs)	Edgbaston, Birmingham; Umpires: Michael Gough and Richard Illingworth; Player of the match: Alex Davies (Lancashire Lightning)
Northamptonshire won the toss and elected to field				Edgbaston, Birmingham; Umpires: Michael Gough and Richard Illingworth; Player of the match: Alex Davies (Lancashire Lightning)

== Personnel ==
Team	Head coach	Captain	Overseas player(s)
Birmingham Bears	(Scotland) Dougie Brown	(England) Varun Chopra	(New Zealand) Brendon McCullum (New Zealand) Jeetan Patel
Derbyshire Falcons	(England) Graeme Welch	(South Africa) Wayne Madsen	(South Africa) Hashim Amla (Sri Lanka) Tillakaratne Dilshan (Australia) Nathan Rimmington
Durham Jets	(England) Jon Lewis	(England) Mark Stoneman	(Australia) John Hastings
Essex Eagles	(England) Paul Grayson	(Netherlands) Ryan ten Doeschate	(New Zealand) Jesse Ryder (Australia) Shaun Tait
Glamorgan	(Wales) Toby Radford	(South Africa) Jacques Rudolph	(South Africa) Jacques Rudolph (South Africa) Wayne Parnell
Gloucestershire	(England) Richard Dawson	(Australia) Michael Klinger	(Australia) Michael Klinger (Australia) Peter Handscomb
Hampshire	(South Africa) Dale Benkenstein	(England) James Vince	(Pakistan) Yasir Arafat (Australia) Jackson Bird
Kent Spitfires	(Jamaica) Jimmy Adams	(England) Rob Key	
Lancashire Lightning	(England) Ashley Giles	(England) Tom Smith	(Australia) James Faulkner (Australia) Peter Siddle
Leicestershire Foxes	(Australia) Andrew McDonald	(Australia) Mark Cosgrove	(New Zealand) Grant Elliott (Australia) Clint McKay (Australia) Mark Cosgrove (Pakistan) Umar Akmal
Middlesex	(England) Richard Scott	(England) Eoin Morgan	(Australia) Adam Voges (Australia) Joe Burns
Northamptonshire Steelbacks	(England) David Ripley	(England) Alex Wakely	(Pakistan) Shahid Afridi (South Africa) Rory Kleinveldt
Nottinghamshire Outlaws	(England) Mick Newell	(England) James Taylor	(Saint Lucia) Darren Sammy (South Africa) Vernon Philander (Australia) Ben Hilfenhaus
Somerset	(England) Matthew Maynard	(South Africa) Alfonso Thomas	(Jamaica) Chris Gayle (Pakistan) Abdur Rehman (New Zealand) Luke Ronchi (Pakistan) Sohail Tanvir (South Africa) Alfonso Thomas
Surrey	(South Africa) Graham Ford	(England) Gareth Batty	(Sri Lanka) Kumar Sangakkara (Australia) Moises Henriques (Pakistan) Wahab Riaz
Sussex Sharks	(England) Mark Robinson	(England) Luke Wright	(Australia) Steve Magoffin (Sri Lanka) Mahela Jayawardene (Australia) George Bailey
Worcestershire Rapids	(England) Steve Rhodes	(England) Daryl Mitchell	(New Zealand) Colin Munro (Pakistan) Saeed Ajmal (Sri Lanka) Sachithra Senanayake
Yorkshire Vikings	(Australia) Jason Gillespie	(England) Andrew Gale	(Australia) Aaron Finch (Australia) Glenn Maxwell (India) Cheteshwar Pujara

== Statistics ==
=== Highest team totals ===
The following table lists the five highest team scores in the season.

Team	Total	Opponent	Ground
Birmingham Bears	242/2	Derbyshire Falcons	Edgbaston, Birmingham
Glamorgan	240/3	Surrey	The Oval, London
Kent Spitfires	231/7	Surrey	The Oval, London
Lancashire Lightning	231/4	Yorkshire Vikings	Old Trafford, Manchester
Kent Spitfires	227/7	Somerset	County Ground, Taunton

=== Most runs ===
The top five highest run scorers (total runs) in the season are included in this table.

Player	Team	Runs	Inns	Avg	S/R	HS	100s	50s	4s	6s
James Vince	Hampshire	710	16	59.19	134.46	107*	1	5	87	14
Michael Klinger	Gloucestershire	654	12	81.75	142.17	126*	3	4	54	21
Sam Northeast	Kent Spitfires	641	14	49.30	152.98	114	1	4	68	16
Luke Wright	Sussex Sharks	564	14	51.27	171.95	111*	1	3	51	29
Richard Levi	Northamptonshire	485	16	34.64	143.49	67*	0	3	61	15

=== Highest scores ===
This table contains the top five highest scores of the season made by a batsman in a single innings.

Player	Team	Score	Balls	4s	6s	Opponent	Ground
Brendon McCullum	Birmingham Bears	158*	64	13	11	Derbyshire Falcons	Edgbaston, Birmingham
Chris Gayle	Somerset	151*	62	10	15	Kent Spitfires	County Ground, Taunton
Michael Klinger	Gloucestershire	126*	68	7	8	Essex Eagles	County Ground, Bristol
Jason Roy	Surrey	122*	65	8	6	Somerset	The Oval, London
Dawid Malan	Middlesex	115*	64	14	3	Sussex Sharks	County Ground, Hove

=== Most wickets ===
The following table contains the five leading wicket-takers of the season.

Player	Team	Wkts	Inns	Ave	S/R	Econ	BBI
James Faulkner	Lancashire Lightning	25	13	12.64	12.1	6.25	3/19
Stephen Parry	Lancashire Lightning	25	16	15.68	13.6	6.87	4/16
Tom Smith	Gloucestershire	23	12	13.13	11.2	7.02	5/39
Shaun Tait	Essex Eagles	23	14	19.34	13.8	8.39	3/28
Usman Arshad	Durham Jets	22	13	13.27	10.0	7.89	3/18

=== Best bowling figures ===
This table lists the top five players with the best bowling figures.

Player	Team	Overs	Figures	Opponent	Ground
Kyle Abbott	Middlesex	4	5/14	Sussex Sharks	County Ground, Hove
James Franklin	Middlesex	4	5/21	Kent Spitfires	Lord's, London
Matthew Fisher	Yorkshire Vikings	3.2	5/22	Derbyshire Falcons	Headingley, Leeds
David Payne	Gloucestershire	3.3	5/24	Middlesex	Old Deer Park, Richmond
Tom Smith	Gloucestershire	4	5/39	Essex Eagles	County Ground, Bristol

== See also ==
- 2015 Royal London One-Day Cup
- 2015 County Championship
