= Ateeq Javid =

English cricketer (born 1991)

Personal information
- Full name: Ateeq Javid
- Born: 15 October 1991 (age 35); Aston, Birmingham, England
- Height: 5 ft 8 in (1.73 m)
- Batting: Right handed
- Bowling: Right arm off break
- Role: All-rounder

Domestic team information
- Years: Team
- 2009–2017: Warwickshire (squad no. 17)
- 2018–2019: Leicestershire (squad no. 99)
- FC debut: 11 June 2009 Warwickshire v Durham UCCE
- LA debut: 8 August 2011 England Development XI v Sri Lanka A

Career statistics
| Competition | FC | LA | T20 |
|---|---|---|---|
| Matches | 43 | 45 | 59 |
| Runs scored | 1,503 | 646 | 527 |
| Batting average | 23.48 | 26.91 | 22.91 |
| 100s/50s | 3/5 | 0/0 | 0/1 |
| Top score | 143 | 43 | 51* |
| Balls bowled | 776 | 1,319 | 711 |
| Wickets | 5 | 28 | 30 |
| Bowling average | 88.20 | 46.50 | 29.16 |
| 5 wickets in innings | 0 | 0 | 0 |
| 10 wickets in match | 0 | 0 | 0 |
| Best bowling | 1/1 | 4/42 | 4/17 |
| Catches/stumpings | 18/– | 7/– | 11/– |
- Source: ESPNcricinfo, 9 June 2019

Ateeq Javid (born 15 October 1991) is a former English cricketer. He started his cricket career at Aston Manor CC where he was picked up for Warwickshire. He played club cricket for West Bromwich Dartmouth in the Birmingham Premier League when he moved on from Aston Manor. He is a right-handed batsman and a right arm off spin bowler. He made his debut for the county in June 2009 against Durham UCCE. Ateeq went to Aston Manor Academy along with professional footballer Saido Berahino, cricketer Recordo Gordon and MMA fighter Leon Edwards.

In September 2017, it was announced that Javid would leave Warwickshire at the end of the season to join Leicestershire on a two-year contract ahead of the 2018 season. An opportunity to open against Durham brought his only half-century of the season in 10 attempts in 2018, and he was released at the end of the 2019 season.

== Awards and nominations ==
In January 2015, Javid was nominated for the Best at Sport award at the British Muslim Awards.

== Anti-Semitism ==
In 2021, whilst coaching and playing at Hampton and Solihull CC, Javid was revealed to have exchanged a series of anti-Semitic posts with former England Under 19 team-mate Azeem Rafiq on Facebook in 2011.
