= Tom Smith (cricketer, born 1987) =

English cricketer

Personal information
- Full name: Thomas Michael John Smith
- Born: 29 August 1987 (age 39); Eastbourne, East Sussex, England
- Batting: Right-handed
- Bowling: Slow left arm orthodox

Domestic team information
- Years: Team
- 2006–2009: Sussex
- 2009: Surrey
- 2010–2013: Middlesex
- 2013: → Gloucestershire (on loan)
- 2014–2025: Gloucestershire (squad no. 6)

Career statistics
Competition	FC	LA	T20
Matches	55	112	187
Runs scored	1,422	704	398
Batting average	22.57	20.70	17.30
100s/50s	0/4	0/2	0/0
Top score	84	65	36*
Balls bowled	7,469	4,533	3,555
Wickets	82	103	193
Bowling average	50.86	38.14	22.84
5 wickets in innings	0	0	3
10 wickets in match	0	0	0
Best bowling	4/35	4/26	5/16
Catches/stumpings	17/–	48/–	61/–
- Source: CricketArchive, 26 July 2025

Thomas Michael John Smith (born 29 August 1987) is an English cricketer who plays for Gloucestershire County Cricket Club.

== Career ==
He is a right-handed batsman and a left-arm spinner, whose professional career started at Sussex in 2006, where he played eight List A matches, two Twenty20 matches and two first-class matches with modest success. However, further opportunities were limited due to the club possessing other spin options such as Mushtaq Ahmed, Ollie Rayner, Will Beer, Piyush Chawla, Saqlain Mushtaq, Rory Hamilton-Brown and Mike Yardy, and he was loaned to Surrey in 2009, where he made two Pro 40 appearances, helping them to a four-wicket win v Leicestershire by scoring 65 off 61 balls.

By the middle of the 2009 season, it had appeared likely Smith's future lay away from Sussex, and after Middlesex managing director of Cricket Angus Fraser watched him turn out for, he signed in October for the London-based club on a contract until 2012. In the same month, he was named in an England performance squad. In his first season, he was restricted to four County Championship appearances by Shaun Udal's presence, but featured extensively in the two limited-overs competitions, and won the Man of the Match award for taking 5–24 v Kent at Lord's. It was a similar story in 2011 – when the club signed his former team-mate Rayner on loan from Sussex in a deal which later become permanent and gave a short-term contract to Jamie Dalrymple – and 2012, as he played four Championship matches in that time but continued playing the majority of the limited-overs matches.

Smith signed a one-year contract with Middlesex for 2013, and things started brightly after he was included in the team for two Championship and three Yorkshire Bank 40 matches before the end of May. However, with Rayner making himself difficult to dislodge thanks to his batting and fielding ability and improving bowling performances, and Ravi Patel emerging, Smith was loaned to Gloucestershire in a deal that was ultimately extended until the end of the season. Highlights of his time there have included a YB40 hat-trick, and a maiden first-class 50. On 24 September 2013, as the 2013 season was finishing, Smith signed a three-year deal to take him up to the end of the 2016 season.

He continues to play for Gloucestershire into the 2019 season, predominantly in limited overs matches, though in July 2019 he made his highest first-class score of 84 against Leicestershire.

In July 2025, Smith announced he would retire from professional cricket at the end of that year's T20 Blast.

== Career best performances ==
as of 11 August 2019

	Batting				Bowling			
	Score	Fixture	Venue	Season	Score	Fixture	Venue	Season
FC	84	Gloucestershire v Leicestershire	Bristol	2019	4–35	Gloucestershire v Kent	Canterbury	2014
LA	65	Surrey Brown Caps v Leicestershire Foxes	Leicester	2009	3–26	Middlesex Panthers v Derbyshire Phantoms	Lord's	2010
T20	36*	Middlesex Panthers v Gloucestershire Gladiators	Uxbridge	2011	5–24	Middlesex Panthers v Kent Spitfires	Lord's	2010

== Personal life ==
Smith's wife Laura, with whom he had two daughters, died in 2018.
