= Tom Wells (cricketer) =

English cricketer

Personal information
- Full name: Thomas Joshua Wells
- Born: 15 March 1993 (age 33); Grantham, Lincolnshire, England
- Batting: Right-handed
- Bowling: Right-arm medium-fast
- Role: All-rounder

Domestic team information
- Years: Team
- 2012–2018: Leicestershire (squad no. 83)
- FC debut: 2 August 2013 Leics v Lancashire
- LA debut: 27 August 2012 Leics v Gloucestershire

Career statistics
Competition	FC	LA	T20
Matches	17	32	62
Runs scored	522	647	631
Batting average	20.88	32.35	18.55
100s/50s	0/2	0/3	0/2
Top score	87*	69	64*
Balls bowled	1,168	760	142
Wickets	19	17	4
Bowling average	45.15	51.76	60.00
5 wickets in innings	0	0	0
10 wickets in match	0	0	0
Best bowling	4/46	3/44	1/5
Catches/stumpings	8/–	8/–	36/–
- Source: CricketArchive, 24 August 2018

Thomas Joshua Wells (born 15 March 1993) is an ex professional English cricketer active from 2013 who used to play for Leicestershire, now plying his trade for Cornwall Cricket League leaders, Penzance CC and Cornwall County Cricket Club. He is a righthanded batsman who bowls right arm medium fast.
