= Usman Arshad (English cricketer) =

English cricketer

Personal information
- Full name: Usman Arshad
- Born: 9 January 1993 (age 33); Bradford, West Yorkshire, England
- Batting: Right-handed
- Bowling: Right-arm medium-fast
- Role: Bowler

Domestic team information
- Years: Team
- 2011–2018: Northumberland
- 2013–2017: Durham (squad no. 78)
- 2018: Leicestershire
- 2019: Lincolnshire
- FC debut: 22 August 2013 Durham v Surrey
- LA debut: 26 August 2013 Durham v Surrey

Career statistics
Competition	FC	LA	T20
Matches	18	14	46
Runs scored	557	56	208
Batting average	25.31	18.66	16.00
100s/50s	0/3	0/0	0/0
Top score	84	25	43
Balls bowled	1,720	453	809
Wickets	36	9	45
Bowling average	28.77	52.33	25.93
5 wickets in innings	0	0	0
10 wickets in match	0	0	0
Best bowling	4/78	3/50	3/18
Catches/stumpings	6/–	2/–	9/–
- Source: CricketArchive, 15 May 2022

Usman Arshad (born 9 January 1993) is an English cricketer who played for Durham and Leicestershire County Cricket Clubs. He is a right-arm medium-fast bowler who also bats right-handed. He made his first-class debut for the county in August 2013 against Surrey. His List A debut, also for Durham, had come against the same opposition exactly a decade earlier, in August 2013.
