= George Edwards (cricketer) =

English cricketer (born 1992)

Personal information
- Full name: George Alexander Edwards
- Born: 29 July 1992 (age 34); Lambeth, London, England
- Height: 6 ft 4 in (1.93 m)
- Batting: Right-handed
- Bowling: Right-arm fast-medium

Domestic team information
- Years: Team
- 2011–2014: Surrey (squad no. 56)
- 2015–2016: Lancashire (squad no. 22)
- FC debut: 11 May 2011 Surrey v Cambridge MCCU
- LA debut: 26 August 2013 Surrey v Durham

Career statistics
| Competition | FC | LA | T20 |
|---|---|---|---|
| Matches | 4 | 5 | 18 |
| Runs scored | 56 | 9 | 3 |
| Batting average | 14.00 | – | – |
| 100s/50s | 0/0 | 0/0 | 0/0 |
| Top score | 19 | 8* | 2* |
| Balls bowled | 602 | 162 | 344 |
| Wickets | 8 | 2 | 27 |
| Bowling average | 43.25 | 100.50 | 18.85 |
| 5 wickets in innings | 0 | 0 | 0 |
| 10 wickets in match | 0 | 0 | 0 |
| Best bowling | 4/44 | 1/29 | 4/20 |
| Catches/stumpings | 1/– | 3/– | 3/– |
- Source: CricketArchive, 24 September 2016

George Alexander Edwards (born 29 July 1992) is an English cricketer, who most recently played for Lancashire.

Edwards is the fifth of six children born to Dennis (1956-2012) and Anne Edwards (b. 1955). He was named after the West Indian cricketer George Headley. He came through the ranks of Surrey, making his first-class debut in 2011 against Cambridge MCCU. He was selected for an ECB training camp in February 2013.

Edwards along with Jack Winslade was released by Surrey towards the end of the 2014 season, with the agreement they could join the MCC Young Cricketers for the 2015 campaign. However, in November 2014 Edwards signed a two-year deal with Lancashire.
