= Recordo Gordon =

Jamaican-born English cricketer (born 1991)

Personal information
- Full name: Recordo Olton Gordon
- Born: 12 October 1991 (age 35); St. Elizabeth's, Jamaica
- Height: 6 ft 2 in (1.88 m)
- Batting: Right-handed
- Bowling: Right-arm fast-medium
- Role: Bowler

Domestic team information
- Years: Team
- 2011: Herefordshire
- 2013–2016: Warwickshire (squad no. 44)

Career statistics
Competition	FC	LA	T20
Matches	6	12	25
Runs scored	52	11	39
Batting average	17.33	5.50	7.80
100s/50s	0/0	0/0	0/0
Top score	14*	9*	18
Balls bowled	800	514	534
Wickets	13	16	36
Bowling average	31.76	33.25	21.13
5 wickets in innings	0	0	0
10 wickets in match	0	0	0
Best bowling	4/53	3/25	4/20
Catches/stumpings	3/–	3/–	0/–
- Source: CricketArchive, 15 December 2016

Recordo Olton Gordon (born 12 October 1991) is a Jamaican–born English cricketer. Gordon is a right-handed batsman who bowls right-arm fast-medium. He was born at St. Elizabeth's, Jamaica.

Gordon played minor counties cricket for Herefordshire in 2011, making a single appearance for the county in the MCCA Knockout Trophy against Bedfordshire. Signed by Warwickshire in that same season, he made impressive performances for the county second XI in that season, before suffering a stress fracture of his back following a pre–season tour to Barbados in early 2012, missing the entire season. Gordon later made his full debut for the county in their first first-class match of the 2013 season against Oxford MCCU at the University Parks, scoring 15 runs in the match and taking the wickets of Sam Agarwal and Stewart Davison in Oxford's first-innings, before taking the wicket of Ben Williams in their second-innings.

In November 2020, Gordon was signed by Audley Cricket Club to play in the North Staffordshire and South Cheshire League during the summer of 2021 in England.

In November 2025 Gordon was arrested and charged with theft of a motor vehicle and possession of an offensive weapon after he was arrested carrying a machete in a stolen car.
