= Will Beer =

English cricketer (born 1988)

William Beer
Personal information
- Full name: William Andrew Thomas Beer
- Born: 8 October 1988 (age 38); Crawley, West Sussex, England
- Batting: Right-handed
- Bowling: Right arm leg break

Domestic team information
- Years: Team
- 2008–2022: Sussex (squad no. 18)
- FC debut: 10 April 2008 Sussex v MCC
- LA debut: 19 April 2009 Sussex v Gloucestershire

Career statistics
Competition	FC	LA	T20
Matches	28	66	136
Runs scored	797	535	389
Batting average	28.46	16.21	9.26
100s/50s	0/4	0/1	0/0
Top score	97	75	37
Balls bowled	2,928	2,898	2,346
Wickets	43	62	106
Bowling average	36.04	40.00	27.77
5 wickets in innings	2	0	0
10 wickets in match	1	0	0
Best bowling	6/29	3/27	3/14
Catches/stumpings	6/–	18/–	26/–
- Source: CricketArchive, 3 July 2022

William Andrew Thomas Beer (born 8 October 1988) is an English cricketer. Primarily a leg break bowler, he formerly played for Sussex County Cricket Club and currently plays for Horsham.

Promoted from Sussex's youth academy at the end of 2007, Beer made his first-class debut in the season's opening game against Marylebone Cricket Club. Bowling five overs, Beer took one wicket in the MCC's only innings of the match, that of Surrey's Arun Harinath. He also made four appearances in the 2008 Twenty20 Cup, where he took three wickets.
