= 2014 County Championship =

English cricket tournament

- Tournament logo
- Dates: 6 April – 26 September 2014
- Administrator: England and Wales Cricket Board
- Cricket format: First-class cricket (4 days)
- Tournament format: League system
- Champions: Yorkshire (31st title)
- Participants: 18
- Matches: 144
- Most runs: James Vince (1525 for Hampshire)
- Most wickets: Mark Footitt (82 for Derbyshire)

The 2014 County Championship season, known as the LV= County Championship for sponsorship reasons, was the 115th cricket County Championship season. It was contested through two divisions: Division One and Division Two. Each team played all the others in their division both home and away.

== Teams ==
Home grounds of each County

=== Division One ===
Team promoted from Division Two

Team	Primary home ground	Other grounds	Coach	Captain	Overseas player(s)
Durham	Riverside Ground, Chester-le-Street	—	(England) Jon Lewis	(England) Paul Collingwood	(Sri Lanka) Kumar Sangakkara (May) (Australia) John Hastings (Jun–Sep) (India) Varun Aaron (Sep)
Lancashire	Old Trafford, Manchester	Aigburth, Liverpool	(England) Peter Moores (Apr) (England) Glen Chapple (Apr–Sep)	(England) Glen Chapple	(Australia) Usman Khawaja (Jun–Sep) (Pakistan) Junaid Khan (Sep)
Middlesex	Lord's, London	Merchant Taylors' School Ground, Northwood; Uxbridge Cricket Club Ground, Uxbridge; Richmond Cricket Ground, Richmond	(England) Richard Scott	(Australia) Chris Rogers	(Australia) Chris Rogers
Northamptonshire	County Ground, Northampton	—	(England) David Ripley	(England) Stephen Peters	(New Zealand) Ian Butler (May) (South Africa) Richard Levi (Jun–Jul) (New Zealand) Neil Wagner (Aug–Sep)
Nottinghamshire	Trent Bridge, Nottingham	—	(England) Mick Newell	(England) Chris Read	(Australia) Peter Siddle (Apr–Jul)
Somerset	County Ground, Taunton	—	(South Africa) Dave Nosworthy	(England) Marcus Trescothick	(South Africa) Alviro Petersen (Apr–Jul) (South Africa) Colin Ingram (Jul)
Sussex	County Ground, Hove	Arundel Castle Cricket Club Ground, Arundel; Cricket Field Road Ground, Horsham	(England) Mark Robinson	(Ireland) Ed Joyce	(Australia) Steve Magoffin
Warwickshire	Edgbaston, Birmingham	—	(Scotland) Dougie Brown	(England) Jim Troughton	(New Zealand) Jeetan Patel
Yorkshire	Headingley, Leeds	North Marine Road Ground, Scarborough	(Australia) Jason Gillespie	(England) Andrew Gale	(New Zealand) Kane Williamson (Apr–May, Aug) (Australia) Aaron Finch (May–Jul)

=== Division Two ===
Team relegated from Division One

Team	Primary home ground	Other grounds	Coach	Captain	Overseas player(s)
Derbyshire	County Ground, Derby	Queen's Park, Chesterfield	(England) Graeme Welch	(South Africa) Wayne Madsen	(Cricket West Indies) Shivnarine Chanderpaul (Apr–May, Jul) (Australia) Marcus North (May–Jun) (India) Cheteshwar Pujara (Sep)
Essex	County Ground, Chelmsford	Castle Park Cricket Ground, Colchester	(England) Paul Grayson	(England) James Foster	(New Zealand) Jesse Ryder (May–Sep)
Glamorgan	SWALEC Stadium, Cardiff	Penrhyn Avenue, Rhos-on-Sea; St Helen's, Swansea	(Wales) Toby Radford	(Wales) Mark Wallace	(South Africa) Jacques Rudolph
Gloucestershire	County Ground, Bristol	College Ground, Cheltenham	(New Zealand) John Bracewell	(Australia) Michael Klinger	(Australia) Michael Klinger (Apr–Jul) (New Zealand) Mark Craig (Aug)
Hampshire	The Rose Bowl, Southampton	—	(South Africa) Dale Benkenstein	(England) Jimmy Adams	(South Africa) Kyle Abbott (Apr–Jun) (Australia) Glenn Maxwell (Jun) (Australia) Nathan Rimmington (Jul)
Kent	St Lawrence Ground, Canterbury	Nevill Ground, Tunbridge Wells	(Cricket West Indies) Jimmy Adams	(England) Rob Key	(Australia) Doug Bollinger
Leicestershire	Grace Road, Leicester	—	(England) Phil Whitticase	(Cricket West Indies) Ramnaresh Sarwan	(Cricket West Indies) Ramnaresh Sarwan (May–Jun)
Surrey	The Oval, London	Woodbridge Road, Guildford	(South Africa) Graham Ford	(South Africa) Graeme Smith	(South Africa) Graeme Smith (Apr–May) (South Africa) Hashim Amla (May–Jun) (Sri Lanka) Tillakaratne Dilshan (Jun–Aug)
Worcestershire	County Ground, New Road, Worcester	—	(England) Steve Rhodes	(England) Daryl Mitchell	(Pakistan) Saeed Ajmal (Apr–Jul) (New Zealand) Mitchell McClenaghan (Jul–Sep)

== Standings ==
Teams receive 16 points for a win, 8 for a tie and 5 for a draw. Bonus points (a maximum of 5 batting points and 3 bowling points) may be scored during the first 110 overs of each team's first innings.

=== Division One ===
Team	Pld	W	L	T	D	A	Bat	Bowl	Ded	Pts
Yorkshire (C)	16	8	1	0	7	0	48	44	0	255
Warwickshire	16	8	4	0	4	0	47	43	0	238
Sussex	16	6	4	0	5	1	44	40	0	210
Nottinghamshire	16	6	6	0	4	0	50	40	0	206
Durham	16	5	4	0	7	0	42	42	0	199
Somerset	16	4	2	0	10	0	42	42	0	198
Middlesex	16	4	5	0	6	1	35	38	2	170
Lancashire (R)	16	3	6	0	7	0	30	41	0	154
Northamptonshire (R)	16	0	12	0	4	0	27	32	0	79

=== Division Two ===
Team	Pld	W	L	T	D	A	Bat	Bowl	Ded	Pts
Hampshire (P)	16	7	1	0	8	0	50	38	0	240
Worcestershire (P)	16	8	3	0	5	0	37	47	0	237
Essex	16	7	2	0	7	0	37	45	0	229
Derbyshire	16	6	5	0	5	0	26	41	0	188
Surrey	16	4	5	0	7	0	43	44	3	183
Kent	16	4	6	0	6	0	35	42	0	171
Gloucestershire	16	4	5	0	7	0	28	36	0	163
Glamorgan	16	3	6	0	7	0	29	41	0	153
Leicestershire	16	0	10	0	6	0	36	42	0	108

== Results summary ==
The fixtures for 2014 were announced in November 2013.

=== Division One ===
	Durham	Lancashire	Middlesex	Northamptonshire	Nottinghamshire	Somerset	Sussex	Warwickshire	Yorkshire
Durham		Durham; 27 runs	Match drawn	Durham inn & 219 runs	Durham; 54 runs	Match drawn	Durham; 309 runs	Warwickshire inn & 188 runs	Match drawn
Lancashire	Lancashire; 1 wicket		Match drawn	Lancashire inn & 200 runs	Nottinghamshire; 1 wicket	Match drawn	Match drawn	Match drawn	Yorkshire inn & 18 runs
Middlesex	Durham; 141 runs	Middlesex; 10 wickets		Match drawn	Middlesex; 10 wickets	Match drawn	Abandoned; No result	Match drawn	Middlesex; 7 wickets
Northamptonshire	Match drawn	Lancashire; 60 runs	Middlesex inn & 84 runs		Nottinghamshire; 5 wickets	Somerset; 52 runs	Match drawn	Warwickshire inn & 105 runs	Yorkshire; 271 runs
Nottinghamshire	Match drawn	Nottinghamshire; 45 runs	Nottinghamshire; 6 wickets	Nottinghamshire inn & 10 runs		Nottinghamshire; 7 wickets	Sussex; 191 runs	Warwickshire; 98 runs	Yorkshire inn & 152 runs
Somerset	Somerset; 7 wickets	Match drawn	Match drawn	Match drawn	Match drawn		Somerset; 6 wickets	Warwickshire; 215 runs	Match drawn
Sussex	Match drawn	Sussex; 7 wickets	Sussex inn & 172 runs	Sussex inn & 85 runs	Match drawn	Somerset inn & 11 runs		Sussex; 226 runs	Match drawn
Warwickshire	Warwickshire inn & 13 runs	Match drawn	Warwickshire inn & 47 runs	Warwickshire inn & 16 runs	Warwickshire; 3 wickets	Match drawn	Sussex; 7 wickets		Yorkshire inn & 8 runs
Yorkshire	Match drawn	Match drawn	Yorkshire; 220 runs	Yorkshire inn & 120 runs	Match drawn	Match drawn	Yorkshire; 9 wickets	Yorkshire inn & 155 runs	

Home team won	Visiting team won	Match drawn

=== Division Two ===
	Derbyshire	Essex	Glamorgan	Gloucestershire	Hampshire	Kent	Leicestershire	Surrey	Worcestershire
Derbyshire		Match drawn	Derbyshire; 6 wickets	Match drawn	Match drawn	Match drawn	Derbyshire; 408 runs	Surrey; 10 wickets	Derbyshire; 138 runs
Essex	Essex; 53 runs		Match drawn	Essex; 10 wickets	Essex; 2 wickets	Essex; 9 wickets	Match drawn	Match drawn	Essex inn & 92 runs
Glamorgan	Glamorgan; 106 runs	Essex; 63 runs		Match drawn	Hampshire; 291 runs	Glamorgan inn & 11 runs	Match drawn	Surrey; 9 wickets	Match drawn
Gloucestershire	Derbyshire; 6 wickets	Match drawn	Match drawn		Hampshire; 8 wickets	Gloucestershire; 290 runs	Match drawn	Match drawn	Worcestershire; 8 wickets
Hampshire	Match drawn	Hampshire; 470 runs	Hampshire; 6 wickets	Match drawn		Match drawn	Hampshire inn & 34 runs	Match drawn	Match drawn
Kent	Kent; 10 wickets	Match drawn	Match drawn	Gloucestershire; 244 runs	Hampshire; 196 runs		Match drawn	Kent; 8 wickets	Match drawn
Leicestershire	Derbyshire; 9 wickets	Essex inn & 79 runs	Match drawn	Gloucestershire; 9 wickets	Hampshire; 278 runs	Kent; 6 wickets		Match drawn	Worcestershire; 234 runs
Surrey	Derbyshire; 8 wickets	Match drawn	Glamorgan; 10 wickets	Surrey; 4 wickets	Match drawn	Kent; 89 runs	Surrey; 10 wickets		Match drawn
Worcestershire	Worcestershire inn & 64 runs	Worcestershire; 72 runs	Worcestershire; 249 runs	Gloucestershire; 7 wickets	Match drawn	Worcestershire; 125 runs	Worcestershire; 204 runs	Worcestershire; 27 runs	

Home team won	Visiting team won	Match drawn

== Results in full ==
=== Division One ===
==== April ====
6–9 April	(H) Nottinghamshire	v	Lancashire	Nottinghamshire won by 45 runs
Scorecard	272 (87.2 overs); MJ Lumb 93 (179); JM Anderson 5/55 (22 overs)		144 (58.2 overs); TC Smith 42* (82); LJ Fletcher 3/15 (10.2 overs)	Trent Bridge, Nottingham; Umpires: Stephen Gale and Neil Mallender
Scorecard	220 (59.5 overs); MH Wessels 90 (109); TC Smith 5/53 (14.5 overs)		303 (93.5 overs); AG Prince 100 (181); HF Gurney 4/81 (21.5 overs)	Trent Bridge, Nottingham; Umpires: Stephen Gale and Neil Mallender
Lancashire won the toss and elected to field; Points: Nottinghamshire 21, Lancashire 3

6–9 April	Middlesex	v	Sussex (H)	Sussex won by an innings and 127 runs
Scorecard	105 (48.2 overs); DJ Malan 35 (73); J Lewis 4/34 (14 overs)		386 (93.3 overs); MJ Prior 125 (138); ST Finn 6/80 (21.3 overs)	County Ground, Hove; Umpires: Neil Bainton and Nigel Cowley
Scorecard	154 (46.1 overs); CJL Rogers 41 (83); SJ Magoffin 5/56 (17.1 overs)			County Ground, Hove; Umpires: Neil Bainton and Nigel Cowley
Sussex won the toss and elected to field; Middlesex deducted 2 points for a slow over-rate; Points: Sussex 23, Middlesex 1

13–16 April	Nottinghamshire	v	Middlesex (H)	Middlesex won by 10 wickets
Scorecard	326 (100.1 overs); JWA Taylor 62 (84); ST Finn 5/91 (25 overs)		439/9d (131.5 overs); SD Robson 163 (310); A Carter 3/74 (22.5 overs)	Lord's, London; Umpires: Richard Kettleborough and Peter Willey
Scorecard	224 (65.2 overs); CMW Read 44 (52); TJ Murtagh 5/61 (22 overs)		112/0 (18.2 overs); CJL Rogers 63* (50)	Lord's, London; Umpires: Richard Kettleborough and Peter Willey
Nottinghamshire won the toss and elected to bat; Points: Middlesex 23, Nottinghamshire 4

13–16 April	Durham	v	Northamptonshire (H)	Match drawn
Scorecard	452 (135 overs); P Mustard 91 (185); Azharullah 3/116 (28 overs)		378 (103.1 overs); MNW Spriegel 97 (193); U Arshad 4/78 (21.1 overs)	County Ground, Northampton; Umpires: Steve Garratt and Tim Robinson
Scorecard	244 (70 overs); MJ Richardson 59 (104); JD Middlebrook 5/62 (21 overs)		205/9 (69 overs); RI Newton 48* (137); G Onions 3/48 (20 overs)	County Ground, Northampton; Umpires: Steve Garratt and Tim Robinson
Durham won the toss and elected to bat; Points: Northamptonshire 11, Durham 11

13–16 April	Yorkshire	v	Somerset (H)	Match drawn
Scorecard	450 (132.5 overs); AU Rashid 108 (190); C Overton 3/72 (24 overs)		553 (157.5 overs); JG Myburgh 91 (155); LE Plunkett 4/117 (28 overs)	County Ground, Taunton; Umpires: Nigel Cowley and Martin Saggers
Scorecard	193/4d (71 overs); KS Williamson 57 (105); JC Hildreth 1/21 (6 overs)			County Ground, Taunton; Umpires: Nigel Cowley and Martin Saggers
Somerset won the toss and elected to field; Points: Yorkshire 11, Somerset 9

13–16 April	(H) Warwickshire	v	Sussex	Sussex won by 7 wickets
Scorecard	87 (27.5 overs); IJL Trott 37 (64); SJ Magoffin 3/15 (9 overs)		229 (66.5 overs); EC Joyce 117 (156); KHD Barker 3/52 (16 overs)	Edgbaston, Birmingham; Umpires: Nick Cook and Michael Gough
Scorecard	471 (120.3 overs); IR Bell 189* (309); SJ Magoffin 3/88 (26 overs)		333/3 (83 overs); EC Joyce 151* (237); JS Patel 2/110 (29 overs)	Edgbaston, Birmingham; Umpires: Nick Cook and Michael Gough
Warwickshire won the toss and elected to bat; Points: Sussex 20, Warwickshire 3

20–23 April	(H) Durham	v	Somerset	Match drawn
Scorecard	308 (88 overs); KK Jennings 80 (184); L Gregory 4/59 (20 overs)		185 (50.1 overs); PD Trego 48 (41); C Rushworth 4/52 (17 overs)	Riverside Ground, Chester-le-Street; Umpires: Michael Gough and David Millns
Scorecard	213/9d (61 overs); PD Collingwood 52* (82); L Gregory 4/91 (21 overs)		246/4 (73 overs); NRD Compton 100* (211); U Arshad 2/28 (15 overs)	Riverside Ground, Chester-le-Street; Umpires: Michael Gough and David Millns
Somerset won the toss and elected to field; No play on Day 3 due to bad light; Points: Durham 11, Somerset 8

20–23 April	(H) Lancashire	v	Warwickshire	Match drawn
Scorecard	247 (75 overs); PJ Horton 83 (187); CR Woakes 5/63 (16 overs)		324 (111.4 overs); WTS Porterfield 77 (119); TC Smith 4/67 (21 overs)	Old Trafford, Manchester; Umpires: Peter Hartley and Alex Wharf
Scorecard	196 (85.2 overs); PJ Horton 84 (220); JS Patel 4/44 (25.2 overs)		95/5 (24.3 overs); V Chopra 50* (78); SC Kerrigan 4/38 (9 overs)	Old Trafford, Manchester; Umpires: Peter Hartley and Alex Wharf
Lancashire won the toss and elected to bat; Points: Warwickshire 11, Lancashire 9

20–23 April	(H) Yorkshire	v	Northamptonshire	Yorkshire won by an innings and 120 runs
Scorecard	459/9d (125 overs); GS Ballance 174 (256); AJ Hall 4/103 (28 overs)		94 (30 overs); MNW Spriegel 29* (78); JA Brooks 5/36 (12 overs)	Headingley, Leeds; Umpires: Mark Benson and Ian Gould
Scorecard			245 (78.4 overs) (f/o); JD Middlebrook 63 (140); RJ Sidebottom 3/34 (18 overs)	Headingley, Leeds; Umpires: Mark Benson and Ian Gould
Yorkshire won the toss and elected to bat; Points: Yorkshire 23, Northamptonshire 2

27–30 April	Yorkshire	v	Middlesex (H)	Middlesex won by 7 wickets
Scorecard	178 (58.2 overs); LE Plunkett 56* (86); ST Finn 4/50 (17 overs)		123 (45.5 overs); EJG Morgan 33 (66); RJ Sidebottom 4/34 (16 overs)	Lord's, London; Umpires: Rob Bailey and Steve O'Shaughnessy
Scorecard	416 (110.5 overs); GS Ballance 130 (143); ST Finn 4/89 (22 overs)		472/3 (101.4 overs); CJL Rogers 241* (290); KS Williamson 1/69 (14.4 overs)	Lord's, London; Umpires: Rob Bailey and Steve O'Shaughnessy
Middlesex won the toss and elected to field; Points: Middlesex 19, Yorkshire 3

27–30 April	Lancashire	v	Northamptonshire (H)	Lancashire won by 60 runs
Scorecard	119 (44 overs); JM Anderson 28 (24); SP Crook 3/26 (7 overs)		164 (70 overs); MNW Spriegel 62 (183); JM Anderson 5/48 (25 overs)	County Ground, Northampton; Umpires: Richard Kettleborough and Martin Saggers
Scorecard	284 (86.2 overs); JC Buttler 72 (103); OP Stone 4/65 (20 overs)		179 (72.2 overs); JD Middlebrook 87 (192); JM Anderson 5/41 (24 overs)	County Ground, Northampton; Umpires: Richard Kettleborough and Martin Saggers
Northamptonshire won the toss and elected to field; Points: Lancashire 19, Northamptonshire 3

27–29 April	Warwickshire	v	Nottinghamshire (H)	Warwickshire won by 98 runs
Scorecard	263 (72.2 overs); IR Bell 122 (148); A Carter 5/55 (13.2 overs)		116 (38 overs); SR Patel 54 (93); CR Woakes 3/13 (5 overs)	Trent Bridge, Nottingham; Umpires: Steve Garratt and David Millns
Scorecard	152 (39.3 overs); TM Ambrose 29 (33); PM Siddle 3/38 (12 overs)		201 (57 overs); PA Jaques 64 (99); CJC Wright 4/70 (17 overs)	Trent Bridge, Nottingham; Umpires: Steve Garratt and David Millns
Nottinghamshire won the toss and elected to field; Points: Warwickshire 21, Nottinghamshire 3

27–30 April	Somerset	v	Sussex (H)	Somerset won by an innings and 11 runs
Scorecard	372 (114.3 overs); ME Trescothick 116 (234); CJ Jordan 5/76 (27.3 overs)		142 (55 overs); LWP Wells 79* (168); L Gregory 5/49 (18 overs)	County Ground, Hove; Umpires: Nigel Llong and Alex Wharf
Scorecard			219 (68 overs) (f/o); EC Joyce 93 (175); L Gregory 4/48 (14 overs)	County Ground, Hove; Umpires: Nigel Llong and Alex Wharf
Sussex won the toss and elected to field; Points: Somerset 22, Sussex 3

==== May ====
4–7 May	Yorkshire	v	Durham (H)	Match drawn
Scorecard	589/8d (163.2 overs); AW Gale 124 (231); C Rushworth 3/113 (29 overs)		388 (138 overs); MJ Richardson 148 (230); AU Rashid 3/73 (23 overs)	Riverside Ground, Chester-le-Street; Umpires: Jeremy Lloyds and Alex Wharf
Scorecard			100/4 (53 overs) (f/o); KK Jennings 54* (166); RJ Sidebottom 1/18 (5 overs)	Riverside Ground, Chester-le-Street; Umpires: Jeremy Lloyds and Alex Wharf
Yorkshire won the toss and elected to bat; Points: Yorkshire 11, Durham 9

4–7 May	Sussex	v	Lancashire (H)	Match drawn
Scorecard	298 (103 overs); MH Yardy 139 (232); TC Smith 3/69 (19 overs)		191 (82.4 overs); AL Davies 59 (117); SJ Magoffin 4/36 (21.4 overs)	Old Trafford, Manchester; Umpires: Mark Benson and Stephen Gale
Scorecard	216/5d (68 overs); MH Yardy 45 (102); G Chapple 2/45 (16 overs)		19/0 (8.4 overs); PJ Horton 14 (32)	Old Trafford, Manchester; Umpires: Mark Benson and Stephen Gale
Sussex won the toss and elected to bat; Match ended due to rain; Points: Sussex 10, Lancashire 8

4–7 May	Nottinghamshire	v	Somerset (H)	Match drawn
Scorecard	440 (113.4 overs); SR Patel 132 (179); AC Thomas 5/127 (32 overs)		402/9d (110.1 overs); AN Petersen 94 (159); A Carter 3/90 (24.1 overs)	County Ground, Taunton; Umpires: Neil Bainton and Steve O'Shaughnessy
Scorecard	322/4d (102 overs); PA Jaques 150* (281); AC Thomas 2/26 (12 overs)			County Ground, Taunton; Umpires: Neil Bainton and Steve O'Shaughnessy
Somerset won the toss and elected to field; Points: Somerset 12, Nottinghamshire 12

4–6 May	Middlesex	v	Warwickshire (H)	Warwickshire won by an innings and 47 runs
Scorecard	167 (43.5 overs); ST Finn 37* (49); CJC Wright 4/56 (14 overs)		462 (142.3 overs); TR Ambrose 167 (269); TS Roland-Jones 3/66 (29 overs)	Edgbaston, Birmingham; Umpires: Neil Mallender and Peter Willey
Scorecard	248 (91.2 overs); CJL Rogers 82 (139); JS Patel 4/78 (31.2 overs)			Edgbaston, Birmingham; Umpires: Neil Mallender and Peter Willey
Middlesex won the toss and elected to bat; First-class debut: Sam Hain (Warwickshire); Points: Warwickshire 22, Middlesex 2

11–14 May	Lancashire	v	(H) Middlesex	Middlesex won by 10 wickets
Scorecard	266 (93.2 overs); JC Buttler 59 (110); NJ Dexter 6/63 (26 overs)		459/8d (141.3 overs); EJG Morgan 103 (197); KW Hogg 3/48 (29 overs)	Lord's, London; Umpires: Jeff Evans and Jeremy Lloyds
Scorecard	223 (84.2 overs); AG Prince 86 (171); TJ Murtagh 6/60 (26.2 overs)		31/0 (3.5 overs); SD Robson 19* (20)	Lord's, London; Umpires: Jeff Evans and Jeremy Lloyds
Middlesex won the toss and elected to field; Points: Middlesex 22, Lancashire 4

11–14 May	Northamptonshire	v	Nottinghamshire (H)	Nottinghamshire won by an innings and 10 runs
Scorecard	248 (74.1 overs); SD Peters 88 (153); PM Siddle 4/75 (17 overs)		409/8d (85.3 overs); MH Wessels 158 (152); J Middlebrook 2/63 (12 overs)	Trent Bridge, Nottingham; Umpires: Michael Gough and George Sharp
Scorecard	151 (49.2 overs); AJ Hall 27 (48); A Shahzad 4/46 (16 overs)			Trent Bridge, Nottingham; Umpires: Michael Gough and George Sharp
Nottinghamshire won the toss and elected to field; No play on Day 1 due to rain; Points: Nottinghamshire 24, Northamptonshire 3

11–14 May	(H) Sussex	v	Durham	Match drawn
Scorecard	505/9d (113.4 overs); LJ Wright 189 (242); C Rushworth 4/124 (32.4 overs)		451/7 (125 overs); KC Sangakkara 159 (267); SJ Magoffin 2/84 (31 overs)d	County Ground, Hove; Umpires: Richard Illingworth and Martin Saggers
Durham won the toss and elected to field; Points: Sussex 12, Durham 11

11–13 May	(H) Yorkshire	v	Warwickshire	Yorkshire won by an innings and 155 runs
Scorecard	444 (124.3 overs); LE Plunkett 86 (75); CR Woakes 4/68 (27.3 overs)		200 (81.1 overs); IR Bell 97 (218); JA Brooks 3/39 (11.1 overs)	Headingley, Leeds; Umpires: Graham Lloyd and Tim Robinson
Scorecard			89 (31.2 overs) (f/o); TR Ambrose 28 (47); JA Brooks 4/37 (12 overs)	Headingley, Leeds; Umpires: Graham Lloyd and Tim Robinson
Warwickshire won the toss and elected to field; Points: Yorkshire 23, Warwickshire 3

18–21 May	(H) Northamptonshire	v	Middlesex	Middlesex won by an innings and 84 runs
Scorecard	283 (108.5 overs); SD Peters 67 (124); RH Patel 3/49 (21 overs)		543/7d (136 overs); NJ Dexter 163* (265); AJ Hall 2/84 (22 overs)	County Ground, Northampton; Umpires: Martin Bodenham and Richard Kettleborough
Scorecard	176 (87.5 overs); BM Duckett 56 (136); TS Roland-Jones 6/50 (21.5 overs)			County Ground, Northampton; Umpires: Martin Bodenham and Richard Kettleborough
Northamptonshire won the toss and elected to bat; Points: Middlesex 23, Northamptonshire 3

19–22 May	Durham	v	Somerset (H)	Somerset won by 7 wickets
Scorecard	155 (46.1 overs); SG Borthwick 59 (103); AC Thomas 5/41 (15 overs)		234 (68.1 overs); AN Petersen 78 (150); MA Wood 5/37 (18.1 overs)	County Ground, Taunton; Umpires: Nick Cook and Graham Lloyd
Scorecard	326 (111.3 overs); MJ Richardson 116 (227); C Overton 5/63 (21 overs)		250/3 (45.3 overs); ME Trescothick 133 (129); RD Pringle 2/94 (17.3 overs)	County Ground, Taunton; Umpires: Nick Cook and Graham Lloyd
Durham won the toss and elected to bat; First-class debut: Ryan Pringle (Durham); Points: Somerset 20, Durham 3

25–28 May	(H) Nottinghamshire	v	Durham	Match drawn
Scorecard	377 (95.5 overs); SR Patel 99 (141); BA Stokes 3/70 (15 overs)		335/4 (83 overs); GJ Muchall 158 (189); A Shahzad 2/52 (12 overs)	Trent Bridge, Nottingham; Umpires: Neil Bainton and Neil Mallender
Nottinghamshire won the toss and elected to bat; No play on final day due to rain; First-class debut: Gavin Main (Durham); Points: Nottinghamshire 10, Durham 11

25–28 May	Somerset	v	Warwickshire (H)	Match drawn
Scorecard	411 (120.4 overs); JC Hildreth 98 (155); WB Rankin 3/79 (26.4 overs)		294/5 (92.3 overs); WTS Porterfield 118 (229); C Overton 3/68 (20.3 overs)	Edgbaston, Birmingham; Umpires: Stephen Gale and Richard Illingworth
Warwickshire won the toss and elected to field; No play on the final day due to rain; Points: Warwickshire 9, Somerset 9

25–28 May	Lancashire	v	Yorkshire (H)	Match drawn
Scorecard	325 (104.3 overs); PJ Horton 66 (143); JA Brooks 5/90 (31 overs)		243 (71 overs); AW Gale 95* (113); TC Smith 5/49 (13 overs)	Headingley, Leeds; Umpires: Ian Gould and Peter Willey
Scorecard	48/3 (17 overs); SJ Croft 23* (38); TT Bresnan 3/9 (7 overs)			Headingley, Leeds; Umpires: Ian Gould and Peter Willey
Yorkshire won the toss and elected to field; No play on final day due to rain; Points: Yorkshire 9, Lancashire 11

26–29 May	(H) Middlesex	v	Sussex	Match abandoned without a ball bowled
Scorecard				Merchant Taylors' School Ground, Northwood; Umpires: Steve Garratt and David Millns
No toss; Points: Middlesex 5, Sussex 5

31 May – 3 June	Yorkshire	v	(H) Northamptonshire	Yorkshire won by 271 runs
Scorecard	136 (40.3 overs); AJ Finch 34 (52); IG Butler 4/41 (11 overs)		251 (61 overs); JD Middlebrook 70 (95); JA Brooks 4/78 (17 overs)	County Ground, Northampton; Umpires: Nick Cook and Peter Hartley
Scorecard	546/3d (147 overs); A Lyth 230 (398); MNW Spriegel 1/79 (25 overs)		160 (64.1 overs); RI Newton 33 (108); LE Plunkett 4/42 (14.1 overs)	County Ground, Northampton; Umpires: Nick Cook and Peter Hartley
Northamptonshire won the toss and elected to field; Points: Yorkshire 19, Northamptonshire 5

==== June ====
1–4 June	(H) Durham	v	Middlesex	Match drawn
Scorecard	568/9d (131.1 overs); SG Borthwick 216 (305); TS Roland-Jones 5/103 (25.1 overs)		330 (91.2 overs); TS Roland-Jones 63 (105); MA Wood 4/75 (17 overs)	Riverside Ground, Chester-le-Street; Umpires: Jeff Evans and Tim Robinson
Scorecard			90/2 (27 overs) (f/o); SD Robson 42* (88); C Rushworth 1/11 (5 overs)	Riverside Ground, Chester-le-Street; Umpires: Jeff Evans and Tim Robinson
Middlesex won the toss and elected to field; No play on Day 4 due to rain; Points: Durham 13, Middlesex 9

1–4 June	Somerset	v	(H) Lancashire	Match drawn
Scorecard	420 (127.1 overs); AN Petersen 155 (230); SC Kerrigan 3/94 (34 overs)		203 (77.2 overs); AL Davies 62 (152); PD Trego 3/37 (16 overs)	Old Trafford, Manchester; Umpires: Steve Garratt and Neil Mallender
Scorecard			95/3 (33 overs) (f/o); AP Agathangelou 46* (77); PD Trego 3/25 (9 overs)	Old Trafford, Manchester; Umpires: Steve Garratt and Neil Mallender
Somerset won the toss and elected to bat; No play on Day 4 due to rain; Points: Somerset 12, Lancashire 8

1–4 June	Nottinghamshire	v	(H) Sussex	Match drawn
Scorecard	452 (105 overs); SR Patel 156 (181); SJ Magoffin 4/110 (27 overs)		355 (107.3 overs); EC Joyce 164* (289); AR Adams 5/65 (26.3 overs)	County Ground, Hove; Umpires: Graham Lloyd and Jeremy Lloyds
Scorecard	336/4d (67 overs); AD Hales 167 (133); CD Nash 2/91 (22 overs)		198/2 (60 overs); CD Nash 86 (129); SCJ Broad 2/31 (12 overs)	County Ground, Hove; Umpires: Graham Lloyd and Jeremy Lloyds
Sussex won the toss and elected to field; Points: Nottinghamshire 13, Sussex 12

8–10 June	Sussex	v	(H) Somerset	Somerset won by 6 wickets
Scorecard	214 (80.2 overs); EC Joyce 103 (233); PD Trego 3/47 (20 overs)		289 (77.5 overs); C Overton 86 (120); SJ Magoffin 6/60 (19 overs)	County Ground, Taunton; Umpires: Nigel Cowley and Peter Hartley
Scorecard	178 (77.4 overs); LJ Wright 35 (93); AC Thomas 5/40 (20 overs)		107/4 (20.1 overs); NRD Compton 38* (47); JE Anyon 2/28 (6 overs)	County Ground, Taunton; Umpires: Nigel Cowley and Peter Hartley
Sussex won the toss and elected to bat; Alfonso Thomas (Somerset) took four wickets in four balls in the second innings, the first time that such a feat has been achieved by a Somerset bowler in first-class cricket.; Points: Somerset 21, Sussex 4

8–11 June	Lancashire	v	(H) Warwickshire	Match drawn
Scorecard	286 (106.3 overs); AL Davies 59 (148); JS Patel 4/64 (32.3 overs)		322 (123.4 overs); TR Ambrose 62 (106); TC Smith 3/50 (24.4 overs)	Edgbaston, Birmingham; Umpires: Mark Benson and David Millns
Scorecard	322/7d (82 overs); SJ Croft 104* (118); WB Rankin 3/39 (13 overs)		86/5 (40 overs); V Chopra 29 (55); SJ Croft 3/25 (15 overs)	Edgbaston, Birmingham; Umpires: Mark Benson and David Millns
Lancashire won the toss and elected to bat; Points: Warwickshire 10, Lancashire 9

8–11 June	Nottinghamshire	v	(H) Yorkshire	Match drawn
Scorecard	205 (56 overs); MJ Lumb 45 (100); TT Bresnan 3/43 (16 overs)		247 (72 overs); RM Pyrah 45 (46); PM Siddle 4/65 (23 overs)	Headingley, Leeds; Umpires: Martin Saggers and Alex Wharf
Scorecard	335/8d (98 overs); JWA Taylor 96 (224); SA Patterson 4/57 (25 overs)		53/3 (31 overs); JA Leaning 15 (28); AR Adams 2/24 (7 overs)	Headingley, Leeds; Umpires: Martin Saggers and Alex Wharf
Nottinghamshire won the toss and elected to bat; Points: Yorkshire 9, Nottinghamshire 9

14–17 June	Middlesex	v	(H) Nottinghamshire	Nottinghamshire won by 6 wickets
Scorecard	505 (114.5 overs); EJG Morgan 191 (265); AR Adams 3/91 (23 overs)		392 (101.3 overs); AD Hales 96 (110); TJ Murtagh 6/93 (26.3 overs)	Trent Bridge, Nottingham; Umpires: Peter Hartley and Neil Mallender
Scorecard	271/9d (71.3 overs); PR Stirling 66* (92); HF Gurney 4/76 (16.3 overs)		387/4 (74.5 overs); AD Hales 94 (142); RH Patel 3/95 (22 overs)	Trent Bridge, Nottingham; Umpires: Peter Hartley and Neil Mallender
Nottinghamshire won the toss and elected to field; Points: Nottinghamshire 22, Middlesex 8

15–18 June	(H) Durham	v	Lancashire	Durham won by 27 runs
Scorecard	338 (104.1 overs); P Mustard 70 (168); KW Hogg 6/70 (27.1 overs)		266 (78.1 overs); UT Khawaja 86 (139); P Coughlin 3/42 (16 overs)	Riverside Ground, Chester-le-Street; Umpires: Martin Bodenham and George Sharp
Scorecard	267 (82.4 overs); SG Borthwick 92 (139); TC Smith 5/42 (18 overs)		312 (80.4 overs); JC Buttler 100* (131); C Rushworth 4/45 (20.4 overs)	Riverside Ground, Chester-le-Street; Umpires: Martin Bodenham and George Sharp
Lancashire won the toss and elected to field; Points: Durham 22, Lancashire 5

15–18 June	(H) Northamptonshire	v	Warwickshire	Warwickshire won by an innings and 105 runs
Scorecard	312 (95.2 overs); RI Newton 114 (185); CR Woakes 4/87 (24 overs)		602/9d (160 overs); SR Hain 134 (284); JD Middlebrook 3/120 (34 overs)	County Ground, Northampton; Umpires: Graham Lloyd and Jeremy Lloyds
Scorecard	185 (75 overs); JD Middlebrook 50 (112); CR Woakes 4/53 (21 overs)			County Ground, Northampton; Umpires: Graham Lloyd and Jeremy Lloyds
Northamptonshire won the toss and elected to bat; Points: Warwickshire 23, Northamptonshire 4

16–19 June	(H) Sussex	v	Yorkshire	Match drawn
Scorecard	316 (99.5 overs); LWP Wells 74 (182); TT Bresnan 3/81 (26 overs)		470/7d (173 overs); JM Bairstow 161* (290); SJ Magoffin 4/81 (42 overs)	Arundel Castle Cricket Club Ground, Arundel; Umpires: Neil Bainton and Richard Kettleborough
Scorecard	228/3d (95 overs); LWP Wells 81 (246); A Lyth 2/40 (15 overs)			Arundel Castle Cricket Club Ground, Arundel; Umpires: Neil Bainton and Richard Kettleborough
Sussex won the toss and elected to bat; Points: Yorkshire 10, Sussex 9

22–25 June	(H) Durham	v	Sussex	Durham won by 309 runs
Scorecard	337 (87.2 overs); MD Stoneman 113 (152); LJ Hatchett 5/113 (23.2 overs)		205 (65.3 overs); LJ Wright 66* (97); BA Stokes 7/67 (17.3 overs)	Riverside Ground, Chester-le-Street; Umpires: Neil Bainton and Nick Cook
Scorecard	359/6d (94 overs); KK Jennings 103 (219); JC Tredwell 2/78 (19 overs)		182 (48.5 overs); JC Tredwell 50* (60); JW Hastings 4/47 (17 overs)	Riverside Ground, Chester-le-Street; Umpires: Neil Bainton and Nick Cook
Durham won the toss and elected to bat; Points: Durham 22, Sussex 4

22–25 June	(H) Lancashire	v	Northamptonshire	Lancashire won by an innings and 200 runs
Scorecard	650/6d (141 overs); AG Prince 257* (335); AJ Hall 2/105 (27 overs)		180 (64.5 overs); RE Levi 59 (127); G Chapple 5/51 (16.5 overs)	Old Trafford, Manchester; Umpires: Nigel Cowley and Graham Lloyd
Scorecard			270 (71.4 overs) (f/o); AJ Hall 50* (98); SC Kerrigan 4/76 (23.4 overs)	Old Trafford, Manchester; Umpires: Nigel Cowley and Graham Lloyd
Lancashire won the toss and elected to bat; Points: Lancashire 24, Northamptonshire 1

22–25 June	Somerset	v	(H) Nottinghamshire	Nottinghamshire won by 7 wickets
Scorecard	168 (51.2 overs); ME Trescothick 87 (133); HF Gurney 3/44 (15 overs)		461 (102.2 overs); PA Jaques 113 (138); C Overton 4/102 (26 overs)	Trent Bridge, Nottingham; Umpires: Martin Saggers and Peter Willey
Scorecard	402 (108.4 overs); PD Trego 107* (122); AR Adams 3/103 (29 overs)		111/3 (24 overs); PA Jaques 42* (65); C Overton 3/48 (12 overs)	Trent Bridge, Nottingham; Umpires: Martin Saggers and Peter Willey
Somerset won the toss and elected to bat; Points: Nottinghamshire 24, Somerset 3

22–24 June	(H) Warwickshire	v	Yorkshire	Yorkshire won by an innings and 8 runs
Scorecard	228 (71.3 overs); JS Patel 63* (67); RM Pyrah 3/37 (12 overs)		422 (117.3 overs); AJ Finch 110 (146); CR Woakes 3/81 (24 overs)	Edgbaston, Birmingham; Umpires: Jeff Evans and Nigel Llong
Scorecard	186 (70 overs); WTS Porterfield 43 (131); SA Patterson 3/26 (16 overs)			Edgbaston, Birmingham; Umpires: Jeff Evans and Nigel Llong
Warwickshire won the toss and elected to bat; First-class debut: Karl Carver (Yorkshire); Points: Yorkshire 24, Warwickshire 3

29 June – 2 July	(H) Middlesex	v	Northamptonshire	Match drawn
Scorecard	488/9d (134 overs); DJ Malan 154* (258); MNW Spriegel 3/26 (5 overs)		384 (108.5 overs); SP Crook 131 (124); ST Finn 4/110 (29 overs)	Lord's, London; Umpires: Nick Cook and Nigel Llong
Scorecard	199/5d (49 overs); EJG Morgan 81* (95); SP Crook 2/28 (11 overs)		82/3 (46 overs); MNW Spriegel 29* (104); TS Roland-Jones 1/12 (9 overs)	Lord's, London; Umpires: Nick Cook and Nigel Llong
Northamptonshire won the toss and elected to field; Points: Middlesex 12, Northamptonshire 10

29 June – 2 July	Lancashire	v	(H) Somerset	Match drawn
Scorecard	266 (103.4 overs); PJ Horton 140 (256); AC Thomas 3/34 (23 overs)		484 (154.1 overs); ME Trescothick 128 (317); SC Kerrigan 4/168 (51.1 overs)	County Ground, Taunton; Umpires: Rob Bailey and Peter Hartley
Scorecard	251/5 (100 overs); UT Khawaja 60 (151); AC Thomas 3/35 (21 overs)			County Ground, Taunton; Umpires: Rob Bailey and Peter Hartley
Lancashire won the toss and elected to bat; Points: Somerset 11, Lancashire 9

29 June – 2 July	Nottinghamshire	v	(H) Warwickshire	Warwickshire won by 3 wickets
Scorecard	406 (101 overs); AD Hales 183 (224); WB Rankin 3/40 (14 overs)		343 (84.3 overs); CR Woakes 91 (177); AR Adams 4/67 (19 overs)	Edgbaston, Birmingham; Umpires: Martin Bodenham and Jeff Evans
Scorecard	225 (73.4 overs); PA Jaques 79 (124); CR Woakes 5/35 (16.4 overs)		289/7 (92.4 overs); TR Ambrose 82* (154); SR Patel 3/36 (23 overs)	Edgbaston, Birmingham; Umpires: Martin Bodenham and Jeff Evans
Warwickshire won the toss and elected to field; Points: Warwickshire 24, Nottinghamshire 6

==== July ====
6–8 July	(H) Sussex	v	Northamptonshire	Sussex won by an innings and 85 runs
Scorecard	405 (119.1 overs); LJ Wright 158 (228); AJ Hall 4/77 (30 overs)		116 (37.3 overs); JD Middlebrook 28 (73); SJ Magoffin 5/12 (11 overs)	County Ground, Hove; Umpires: Steve Garratt and George Sharp
Scorecard			204 (68.3 overs) (f/o); SP Crook 52* (48); SJ Magoffin 3/28 (17 overs)	County Ground, Hove; Umpires: Steve Garratt and George Sharp
Northamptonshire won the toss and elected to field; Points: Sussex 23, Northamptonshire 2

7–10 July	(H) Middlesex	v	Somerset	Match drawn
Scorecard	338 (97.5 overs); DJ Malan 124 (218); C Overton 4/84 (23.5 overs)		264/9d (98.1 overs); NRD Compton 94 (278); ST Finn 3/80 (27.1 overs)	Uxbridge Cricket Club Ground, Uxbridge; Umpires: Neil Bainton and Neil Mallender
Scorecard	315/5d (69 overs); NRT Gubbins 95 (172); AC Thomas 1/53 (13 overs)		203/4 (57 overs); NRD Compton 83* (136); TS Roland-Jones 2/41 (10 overs)	Uxbridge Cricket Club Ground, Uxbridge; Umpires: Neil Bainton and Neil Mallender
Middlesex won the toss and elected to bat; Points: Middlesex 11, Somerset 10

7–10 July	(H) Yorkshire	v	Durham	Match drawn
Scorecard	426 (115.4 overs); A Lyth 143 (250); MA Wood 5/87 (24 overs)		231 (88.2 overs); PD Collingwood 64* (106); AU Rashid 4/73 (20 overs)	Headingley, Leeds; Umpires: Richard Illingworth and Richard Kettleborough
Scorecard			323/8 (113 overs) (f/o); MJ Richardson 95 (165); JA Brooks 4/66 (23 overs)	Headingley, Leeds; Umpires: Richard Illingworth and Richard Kettleborough
Durham won the toss and elected to field; Points: Yorkshire 13, Durham 9

12–15 July	Somerset	v	(H) Northamptonshire	Somerset won by 52 runs
Scorecard	375 (100.1 overs); ME Trescothick 124 (252); DJ Willey 3/74 (22 overs)		221 (59.1 overs); DJ Willey 53 (45); L Gregory 6/47 (17 overs)	County Ground, Northampton; Umpires: Jeff Evans and Richard Illingworth
Scorecard	249/8d (86 overs); CR Jones 87 (211); JD Middlebrook 4/40 (14 overs)		351 (109.4 overs); AJ Hall 66 (109); L Gregory 5/75 (28 overs)	County Ground, Northampton; Umpires: Jeff Evans and Richard Illingworth
Somerset won the toss and elected to bat; Points: Somerset 23, Northamptonshire 4

13–15 July	Warwickshire	v	(H) Durham	Warwickshire won an innings and 188 runs
Scorecard	472 (124.1 overs); SR Hain 109* (193); JW Hastings 5/94 (30 overs)		171 (57.1 overs); JW Hastings 51 (66); KHD Barker 6/46 (22 overs)	Riverside Ground, Chester-le-Street; Umpires: Stephen Gale and Peter Hartley
Scorecard			113 (48.1 overs) (f/o); KK Jennings 37 (100); JS Patel 5/49 (17 overs)	Riverside Ground, Chester-le-Street; Umpires: Stephen Gale and Peter Hartley
Durham won the toss and elected to field; Points: Warwickshire 24, Durham 2

13–15 July	(H) Lancashire	v	Nottinghamshire	Nottinghamshire won by 1 wicket
Scorecard	225 (69.2 overs); JC Buttler 52 (84); AR Adams 4/45 (17.2 overs)		261 (87.5 overs); SJ Mullaney 82 (149); G Chapple 4/73 (22 overs)	Aigburth, Liverpool; Umpires: Michael Gough and Alex Wharf
Scorecard	205 (54 overs); UT Khawaja 53 (85); HF Gurney 4/22 (9 overs)		170/9 (50.1 overs); CMW Read 40* (66); TC Smith 3/44 (15 overs)	Aigburth, Liverpool; Umpires: Michael Gough and Alex Wharf
Nottinghamshire won the toss and elected to field; Points: Nottinghamshire 21, Lancashire 4

19–22 July	(H) Yorkshire	v	Middlesex	Yorkshire won by 220 runs
Scorecard	253 (87.5 overs); A Lyth 117 (231); ST Finn 4/81 (19.5 overs)		232 (67 overs); JA Simpson 110 (155); RJ Sidebottom 7/44 (17 overs)	North Marine Road Ground, Scarborough; Umpires: Steve Garratt and Martin Saggers
Scorecard	400/5d (109 overs); AW Gale 126* (180); TJ Murtagh 3/64 (23 overs)		201 (80.3 overs); JA Simpson 61 (108); AU Rashid 4/27 (17.3 overs)	North Marine Road Ground, Scarborough; Umpires: Steve Garratt and Martin Saggers
Middlesex won the toss and elected to field; Points: Yorkshire 21, Middlesex 4

21–24 July	(H) Sussex	v	Warwickshire	Sussex won by 226 runs
Scorecard	413 (129.4 overs); LJ Wright 89 (146); KHD Barker 3/65 (27 overs)		333 (111.5 overs); IJL Trott 106 (242); SJ Magoffin 4/74 (26 overs)	Cricket Field Road Ground, Horsham; Umpires: Steve O'Shaughnessy and Alex Wharf
Scorecard	245/9d (60.1 overs); EC Joyce 72 (106); JS Patel 4/84 (24 overs)		99 (41.4 overs); TR Ambrose 56 (131); JC Tredwell 4/7 (12.4 overs)	Cricket Field Road Ground, Horsham; Umpires: Steve O'Shaughnessy and Alex Wharf
Sussex won the toss and elected to bat; Points: Sussex 23, Warwickshire 5

==== August ====
15–18 August	Durham	v	(H) Lancashire	Lancashire won by 1 wicket
Scorecard	340 (99 overs); CS MacLeod 84 (192); TC Smith 5/45 (22 overs)		421 (131.3 overs); PJ Horton 114 (217); JW Hastings 4/78 (28 overs)	Old Trafford, Manchester; Umpires: Russell Evans and Stephen Gale
Scorecard	187 (77.1 overs); PD Collingwood 45* (104); SC Kerrigan 4/61 (33 overs)		107/9 (35.4 overs); TC Smith 35* (61); JW Hastings 4/40 (14 overs)	Old Trafford, Manchester; Umpires: Russell Evans and Stephen Gale
Durham won the toss and elected to bat; Points: Lancashire 22, Durham 5

15–18 August	(H) Northamptonshire	v	Nottinghamshire	Nottinghamshire won by 5 wickets
Scorecard	260 (76 overs); AM Rossington 103 (124); AR Adams 3/60 (20 overs)		388 (113 overs); MJ Lumb 99 (192); DJ Willey 4/46 (25 overs)	County Ground, Northampton; Umpires: Nick Cook and Steve Garratt
Scorecard	338 (88.4 overs); AM Rossington 80 (103); LJ Fletcher 4/76 (20.4 overs)		211/5 (52 overs); AD Hales 102* (142); Azharullah 2/38 (14 overs)	County Ground, Northampton; Umpires: Nick Cook and Steve Garratt
Nottinghamshire won the toss and elected to field; Points: Nottinghamshire 23, Northamptonshire 4

15–18 August	Warwickshire	v	(H) Somerset	Warwickshire won by 215 runs
Scorecard	367 (97.2 overs); IJ Westwood 129 (234); C Overton 3/76 (24 overs)		286 (77.1 overs); TB Abell 95 (188); JS Patel 4/81 (23.1 overs)	County Ground, Taunton; Umpires: Martin Bodenham and Steve O'Shaughnessy
Scorecard	322/7d (93.2 overs); V Chopra 117* (264); L Gregory 3/58 (18.2 overs)		188 (70.2 overs); PD Trego 42 (80); RO Gordon 4/53 (14.2 overs)	County Ground, Taunton; Umpires: Martin Bodenham and Steve O'Shaughnessy
Somerset won the toss and elected to field; First-class debut: Tom Abell (Somerset); Points: Warwickshire 23, Somerset 5

15–18 August	Sussex	v	(H) Yorkshire	Yorkshire won by 9 wickets
Scorecard	368 (111.4 overs); EC Joyce 130 (240); AU Rashid 3/32 (13.4 overs)		493 (126.2 overs); KS Williamson 189 (320); LWP Wells 3/38 (12 overs)	North Marine Road Ground, Scarborough; Umpires: Peter Hartley and Graham Lloyd
Scorecard	230 (79.1 overs); LJ Wright 113 (155); TT Bresnan 3/60 (17 overs)		106/1 (20.1 overs); AZ Lees 46 (50); ME Hobden 1/22 (3 overs)	North Marine Road Ground, Scarborough; Umpires: Peter Hartley and Graham Lloyd
Yorkshire won the toss and elected to field; Points: Yorkshire 24, Sussex 6

31 August–3 September	(H) Durham	v	Nottinghamshire	Durham won by 54 runs
Scorecard	253 (75 overs); MJ Richardson 73 (148); A Shahzad 3/71 (17 overs)		188 (58.2 overs); MH Wessels 37 (51); JW Hastings 4/64 (21.2 overs)	Riverside Ground, Chester-le-Street; Umpires: Jeff Evans and Peter Hartley
Scorecard	309 (92.4 overs); PD Collingwood 100 (220); G Keedy 4/86 (32 overs)		320 (89.3 overs); MH Wessels 90 (127); PKD Chase 5/64 (17 overs)	Riverside Ground, Chester-le-Street; Umpires: Jeff Evans and Peter Hartley
Durham won the toss and elected to bat; First-class debut: Peter Chase (Durham); Points: Durham 21, Nottinghamshire 3

31 August–3 September	(H) Lancashire	v	Yorkshire	Yorkshire won by an innings and 18 runs
Scorecard	278 (74.3 overs); TC Smith 57 (98); RJ Sidebottom 3/42 (14 overs)		610/6d (164 overs); A Lyth 251 (446); SD Parry 4/109 (33 overs)	Old Trafford, Manchester; Umpires: Steve Garrett and Steve O'Shaughnessy
Scorecard	314 (103.2 overs); UT Khawaja 117 (250); AU Rashid 5/117 (40 overs)			Old Trafford, Manchester; Umpires: Steve Garrett and Steve O'Shaughnessy
Lancashire won the toss and elected to bat

31 August–3 September	Warwickshire	v	(H) Middlesex	Match drawn
Scorecard	362/8d (103 overs); Rikki Clarke 94 (149); Neil Dexter 3/63 (21 overs)		372/9d (113 overs); CJL Rogers 85 (170); R Clarke 3/54 (23 overs)	Lord's, London; Umpires: Nigel Cowley and Graham Lloyd
Scorecard	182/2d (57 overs); SR Hain 106* (171); TJ Murtagh 2/32 (10 overs)			Lord's, London; Umpires: Nigel Cowley and Graham Lloyd
Middlesex won the toss and elected to field; Points: Middlesex 11, Warwickshire 11

31 August–3 September	(H) Somerset	v	Northamptonshire	Match drawn
Scorecard	314 (82.1 overs); AWR Barrow 88 (97); DJ Willey 4/64 (17.1 overs)		448/9d (125 overs); BM Duckett 144* (210); AC Thomas 4/116 (33 overs)	County Ground, Taunton; Umpires: Stephen Gale and Alex Wharf
Scorecard	235/6 (97 overs); JG Myburgh 87 (249); DJ Willey 3/47 (22 overs)			County Ground, Taunton; Umpires: Stephen Gale and Alex Wharf
Northamptonshire won the toss and elected to field; Points: Northamptonshire 12, Somerset 10

==== September ====
9–12 September	Durham	v	(H) Middlesex	Durham won by 141 runs
Scorecard	377 (104.3 overs); SG Borthwick 176 (292); TJ Murtagh 5/106 (26.3 overs)		276 (73.1 overs); DJ Malan 97 (140); C Rushworth 3/86 (18 overs)	Lord's, London; Umpires: Neil Bainton and David Millns
Scorecard	294 (91 overs); GJ Muchall 74* (116); TJ Murtagh 5/86 (26 overs)		254 (62 overs); DJ Malan 46 (113); C Rushworth 3/74 (20 overs)	Lord's, London; Umpires: Neil Bainton and David Millns
Durham won the toss and elected to bat; Points: Durham 23, Middlesex 5

9–12 September	Yorkshire	v	(H) Nottinghamshire	Yorkshire won by an innings and 152 runs
Scorecard	532/9d (174.2 overs); A Lyth 122 (231); G Keedy 5/163 (50 overs)		203 (66.2 overs); CMW Read 81* (154); JA Brooks 4/58 (13.2 overs)	Trent Bridge, Nottingham; Umpires: Rob Bailey and Martin Saggers
Scorecard			177 (56.2 overs) (f/o); JWA Taylor 75 (154); RJ Sidebottom 6/30 (18.2 overs)	Trent Bridge, Nottingham; Umpires: Rob Bailey and Martin Saggers
Yorkshire won the toss and elected to bat; Points: Yorkshire 23, Nottinghamshire 2

9–12 September	Lancashire	v	(H) Sussex	Sussex won by 7 wickets
Scorecard	320 (91.5 overs); LA Procter 81* (155); SJ Magoffin 4/96 (25 overs)		434 (125.5 overs); EC Joyce 137 (203); SC Kerrigan 3/117 (32.5 overs)	County Ground, Hove; Umpires: Martin Bodenham and Jeremy Lloyds
Scorecard	364 (102.1 overs); SJ Croft 87 (170); CJ Jordan 4/82 (25 overs)		251/3 (46.3 overs); EC Joyce 79 (80); SJ Croft 1/38 (5 overs)	County Ground, Hove; Umpires: Martin Bodenham and Jeremy Lloyds
Sussex won the toss and elected to field; Points: Sussex 23, Lancashire 5

9–12 September	Northamptonshire	v	(H) Warwickshire	Warwickshire won by an innings and 16 runs
Scorecard	273 (77.3 overs); JM Kettleborough 71 (140); OJ Hannon-Dalby 4/57 (17.3 overs)		573/9d (155 overs); SR Hain 208 (337); JD Middlebrook 5/124 (47 overs)	Edgbaston, Birmingham; Umpires: Nick Cook and Tim Robinson
Scorecard	284 (85.2 overs) (f/o); BM Duckett 71 (91); KHD Barker 4/47 (20.2 overs)			Edgbaston, Birmingham; Umpires: Nick Cook and Tim Robinson
Warwickshire won the toss and elected to field; Points: Warwickshire 24, Northamptonshire 3

15–17 September	(H) Durham	v	Northamptonshire	Durham won by an innings and 219 runs
Scorecard	392 (92.1 overs); SG Borthwick 136 (215); N Wagner 5/104 (20 overs)		83 (23 overs); JD Middlebrook 23 (28); C Rushworth 9/52 (12 overs)	Riverside Ground, Chester-le-Street; Umpires: Rob Bailey and Michael Gough
Scorecard			90 (17.2 overs) (f/o); AM Rossington 22 (17); C Rushworth 6/43 (8 overs)	Riverside Ground, Chester-le-Street; Umpires: Rob Bailey and Michael Gough
Northamptonshire won the toss and elected to field; No play on Day 1 due to rain; Points: Durham 23, Northamptonshire 3

15–18 September	Sussex	v	(H) Nottinghamshire	Sussex won by 191 runs
Scorecard	391 (103.4 overs); CD Nash 178 (235); LJ Fletcher 3/67 (24 overs)		413 (120.4 overs); JWA Taylor 126 (189); SJ Magoffin 4/72 (34 overs)	Trent Bridge, Nottingham; Umpires: Peter Hartley and Richard Kettleborough
Scorecard	406/6d (70 overs); EC Joyce 149 (159); LJ Fletcher 3/66 (18 overs)		193 (60.3 overs); JWA Taylor 46 (91); SJ Magoffin 4/51 (16 overs)	Trent Bridge, Nottingham; Umpires: Peter Hartley and Richard Kettleborough
Sussex won the toss and elected to bat; First-class debut: Luke Wood (Nottinghamshire); Points: Sussex 22, Nottinghamshire 7

15–18 September	(H) Somerset	v	Middlesex	Match drawn
Scorecard	523/9d (159.2 overs); JC Hildreth 182 (362); JL Denly 2/31 (7.2 overs)		223 (82.4 overs); EJG Morgan 82 (194); AC Thomas 3/32 (13.4 overs)	County Ground, Taunton; Umpires: Steve O'Shaughnessy and Alex Wharf
Scorecard			328/4d (123 overs) (f/o); CJL Rogers 203* (386); C Overton 2/26 (12 overs)	County Ground, Taunton; Umpires: Steve O'Shaughnessy and Alex Wharf
Middlesex won the toss and elected to field; Points: Somerset 11, Middlesex 7

23–26 September	Middlesex	v	(H) Lancashire	Match drawn
Scorecard	214 (70.5 overs); JL Denly 38 (74); LA Procter 4/50 (15 overs)		302/8d (109.2 overs); SJ Croft 60 (132); TJ Murtagh 3/69 (30 overs)	Old Trafford, Manchester; Umpires: Nick Cook and David Millns
Scorecard	341/8 (134 overs); SD Robson 75 (106); Junaid Khan 3/84 (29 overs)			Old Trafford, Manchester; Umpires: Nick Cook and David Millns
Middlesex won the toss and elected to bat; Points: Lancashire 11, Middlesex 8

23–26 September	Sussex	v	(H) Northamptonshire	Match drawn
Scorecard	368 (119 overs); Ashar Zaidi 88 (169); OP Stone 5/48 (20 overs)		294 (93.2 overs); RI Keogh 129 (253); SJ Magoffin 5/51 (25 overs)	County Ground, Northampton; Umpires: George Sharp and Peter Willey
Scorecard	343 (115.3 overs); LWP Wells 162 (345); Azharullah 7/76 (23.3 overs)		85/1 (23 overs); SD Peters 42 (71); LWP Wells 1/10 (1 over)	County Ground, Northampton; Umpires: George Sharp and Peter Willey
Sussex won the toss and elected to bat; Points: Sussex 11, Northamptonshire 8

23–25 September	Durham	v	(H) Warwickshire	Warwickshire won by an innings and 13 runs
Scorecard	201 (64.5 overs); RD Pringle 63* (98); KHD Barker 5/59 (17 overs)		429 (119.3 overs); V Chopra 160 (244); C Rushworth 6/100 (31 overs)	Edgbaston, Birmingham; Umpires: Rob Bailey and Stephen Gale
Scorecard	215 (50.1 overs); MD Stoneman 45 (44); KHD Barker 3/41 (15 overs)			Edgbaston, Birmingham; Umpires: Rob Bailey and Stephen Gale
Durham won the toss and elected to bat; Points: Warwickshire 24, Durham 3

23–26 September	(H) Yorkshire	v	Somerset	Match drawn
Scorecard	253 (83.1 overs); AZ Lees 83 (120); PD Trego 4/69 (19.1 overs)		437 (120.1 overs); NRD Compton 156 (232); SA Patterson 4/54 (28 overs)	Headingley, Leeds; Umpires: Peter Hartley and Alex Wharf
Scorecard	365 (94.3 overs); JE Root 97 (128); PD Trego 7/84 (28.3 overs)		151/9 (44 overs); ME Trescothick 44 (48); JA Brooks 3/46 (14 overs)	Headingley, Leeds; Umpires: Peter Hartley and Alex Wharf
Yorkshire won the toss and elected to bat; Points: Somerset 12, Yorkshire 9

=== Division Two ===
==== April ====
6–9 April	(H) Hampshire	v	Worcestershire	Match drawn
Scorecard	263 (66.2 overs); SM Ervine 93 (116); JD Shantry 4/68 (18 overs)		350/7d (105.3 overs); DKH Mitchell 172* (307); MT Coles 3/58 (28 overs)	The Rose Bowl, Southampton; Umpires: David Millns and Alex Wharf
Scorecard	27/1 (17 overs); LA Dawson 11 (29); MM Ali 1/16 (9 overs)			The Rose Bowl, Southampton; Umpires: David Millns and Alex Wharf
Worcestershire won the toss and elected to field; First-class debut: Tom Kohler-Cadmore (Worcestershire) Only 8.5 overs were played during Day 1 & 2 due to rain; Points: Worcestershire 12, Hampshire 9

6–9 April	(H) Surrey	v	Glamorgan	Glamorgan won by 10 wickets
Scorecard	280 (104.4 overs); ZS Ansari 74 (259); J Allenby 4/47 (30 overs)		209 (57.3 overs); J Allenby 52 (68); SC Meaker 4/57 (16 overs)	The Oval, London; Umpires: Peter Hartley and Steve O'Shaughnessy
Scorecard	81 (57.3 overs); GC Smith 18 (27); GG Wagg 6/29 (15 overs)		156/0 (45.4 overs); GP Rees 75* (141)	The Oval, London; Umpires: Peter Hartley and Steve O'Shaughnessy
Glamorgan won the toss and elected to field; Points: Glamorgan 20, Surrey 5

13–16 April	(H) Essex	v	Derbyshire	Essex won by 53 runs
Scorecard	94 (36.3 overs); AN Cook 35 (67); MHA Footitt 5/29 (14.3 overs)		154 (64.5 overs); S Chanderpaul 75* (157); DD Masters 6/46 (22 overs)	County Ground, Chelmsford; Umpires: Jeff Evans and Nigel Llong
Scorecard	425 (127.4 overs); AN Cook 181 (335); TD Groenewald 3/62 (25 overs)		312 (84.4 overs); TD Groenewald 52 (35); GR Napier 3/49 (14 overs)	County Ground, Chelmsford; Umpires: Jeff Evans and Nigel Llong
Essex won the toss and elected to bat; Tim Groenewald (Derbyshire) took a hat-trick in the first innings; Points: Essex 19, Derbyshire 3

13–16 April	(H) Gloucestershire	v	Hampshire	Hampshire won by 8 wickets
Scorecard	304 (101.1 overs); WA Tavaré 139 (281); KJ Abbott 5/67 (23.1 overs)		422 (89.4 overs); JM Vince 144 (184); MD Taylor 5/75 (19.4 overs)	County Ground, Bristol; Umpires: Rob Bailey and Graham Lloyd
Scorecard	332 (97.4 overs); HJM Marshall 94 (215); SM Ervine 2/21 (13 overs)		215/2 (46.3 overs); MA Carberry 100* (131); MD Taylor 1/26 (9 overs)	County Ground, Bristol; Umpires: Rob Bailey and Graham Lloyd
Hampshire won the toss and elected to field; Points: Hampshire 24, Gloucestershire 6

13–16 April	(H) Worcestershire	v	Kent	Worcestershire won by 125 runs
Scorecard	224 (76.3 overs); AN Kervezee 54 (110); RH Joseph 3/43 (17 overs)		229 (96.5 overs); BW Harmison 55 (208); GM Andrew 4/42 (17 overs)	New Road, Worcester; Umpires: Stephen Gale and Ian Gould
Scorecard	270 (88.4 overs); OB Cox 89 (121); DE Bollinger 5/43 (19 overs)		140 (51 overs); BP Nash 28 (62); GM Andrew 4/43 (13 overs)	New Road, Worcester; Umpires: Stephen Gale and Ian Gould
Worcestershire won the toss and elected to bat; Points: Worcestershire 20, Kent 4

20–23 April	Hampshire	v	Derbyshire (H)	Match drawn
Scorecard	328 (112.3 overs); WR Smith 70 (161); MHA Footitt 3/71 (23 overs)		399 (113.3 overs); SC Moore 128 (251); KJ Abbott 4/84 (27 overs)	County Ground, Derby; Umpires: Neil Mallender and Tim Robinson
Scorecard	236/3 (81 overs); JHK Adams 84 (196); MHA Footitt 2/27 (15 overs)			County Ground, Derby; Umpires: Neil Mallender and Tim Robinson
Derbyshire won the toss and elected to field; Points: Derbyshire 11, Hampshire 11

20–23 April	(H) Glamorgan	v	Gloucestershire	Match drawn
Scorecard	145 (43 overs); GG Wagg 54* (65); DA Payne 3/29 (10 overs)		231 (75 overs); CDJ Dent 52 (72); DA Cosker 5/46 (22 overs)	SWALEC Stadium, Cardiff; Umpires: Martin Bodenham and Nigel Llong
Scorecard	146/9 (62 overs); WD Bragg 43 (127); WRS Gidman 6/50 (25 overs)			SWALEC Stadium, Cardiff; Umpires: Martin Bodenham and Nigel Llong
Gloucestershire won the toss and elected to field; Points: Gloucestershire 9, Glamorgan 8

20–23 April	Leicestershire	v	Kent (H)	Match drawn
Scorecard	333 (96.5 overs); MAG Boyce 68 (137); DI Stevens 3/46 (24 overs)		269/7d (82.4 overs); DJ Bell-Drummond 58 (134); RML Taylor 2/40 (11 overs)	St Lawrence Ground, Canterbury; Umpires: Neil Bainton and George Sharp
Scorecard	259/5d (59.1 overs); GP Smith 118 (175); DE Bollinger 2/48 (11 overs)		89/4 (36 overs); DJ Bell-Drummond 39* (110); JKH Naik 2/34 (15 overs)	St Lawrence Ground, Canterbury; Umpires: Neil Bainton and George Sharp
Kent won the toss and elected to field; No play on Day 1 due to rain; Points: Kent 10, Leicestershire 10

20–23 April	Essex	v	Surrey (H)	Match drawn
Scorecard	306 (97.3 overs); RS Bopara 49 (147); MP Dunn 5/60 (20.3 overs)		237 (71.1 overs); GC Smith 65 (88); TS Mills 4/45 (13 overs)	The Oval, London; Umpires: Jeremy Lloyds and Peter Willey
Scorecard	258/4d (74 overs); AN Cook 127* (202); RJ Burns 1/18 (6 overs)			The Oval, London; Umpires: Jeremy Lloyds and Peter Willey
Surrey won the toss and elected to field; No play on Day 1 due to rain; Points: Essex 11, Surrey 9

27–30 April	(H) Gloucestershire	v	Essex	Match drawn
Scorecard	134 (43.1 overs); CDJ Dent 61 (132); DD Masters 6/48 (20 overs)		305/8d (73.5 overs); BT Foakes 132* (157); GJ McCarter 3/64 (16 overs)	County Ground, Bristol; Umpires: Nigel Cowley and Stephen Gale
Scorecard	251/2d (78 overs); APR Gidman 119* (214); DD Masters 1/35 (10 overs)			County Ground, Bristol; Umpires: Nigel Cowley and Stephen Gale
Essex won the toss and elected to field; No play on Day 1 due to rain; Points: Essex 11, Gloucestershire 7

27–30 April	(H) Hampshire	v	Surrey	Match drawn
Scorecard	400/6d (101.1 overs); JM Vince 159 (185); SC Meaker 2/72 (26 overs)		99/2 (38 overs); RJ Burns 53* (121); JA Tomlinson 1/38 (11 overs)	The Rose Bowl, Southampton; Umpires: Mark Benson and Russell Evans
Surrey won the toss and elected to field; Points: Hampshire 10, Surrey 7

27–30 April	(H) Leicestershire	v	Glamorgan	Match drawn
Scorecard	500 (121.4 overs); NJ O'Brien 133 (141); GG Wagg 4/107 (27 overs)		359 (104 overs); GP Rees 72 (161); AJ Ireland 3/81 (27 overs)	Grace Road, Leicester; Umpires: Nick Cook and Jeff Evans
Scorecard	179/8d (42.3 overs); GP Smith 97 (131); GG Wagg 4/65 (14 overs)		250/7 (70.4 overs); JA Rudolph 63 (89); JKH Naik 3/76 (27 overs)	Grace Road, Leicester; Umpires: Nick Cook and Jeff Evans
Glamorgan won the toss and elected to field; Points: Leicestershire 13, Glamorgan 11

27–30 April	Derbyshire	v	Worcestershire (H)	Worcestershire won by an innings and 64 runs
Scorecard	219 (81.3 overs); WL Madsen 111* (244); Saeed Ajmal 4/60 (26.3 overs)		432/9d (112 overs); AN Kervezee 110 (137); MHA Footitt 3/52 (21 overs)	New Road, Worcester; Umpires: Neil Bainton and George Sharp
Scorecard	149 (57 overs); WL Madsen 56 (139); Saeed Ajmal 4/40 (20 overs)			New Road, Worcester; Umpires: Neil Bainton and George Sharp
Derbyshire won the toss and elected to bat; Points: Worcestershire 24, Derbyshire 4

==== May ====
4–7 May	(H) Essex	v	Leicestershire	Match drawn
Scorecard	281 (104.4 overs); JS Foster 82 (170); NL Buck 5/76 (26 overs)		433 (148 overs); EJ Eckersley 110 (309); MS Panesar 6/111 (50 overs)	County Ground, Chelmsford; Umpires: Rob Bailey and Billy Taylor
Scorecard	271/5d (101 overs); GM Smith 85 (173); CE Shreck 2/48 (25 overs)			County Ground, Chelmsford; Umpires: Rob Bailey and Billy Taylor
Essex won the toss and elected to bat; Points: Leicestershire 11, Essex 8

4–7 May	Worcestershire	v	Glamorgan (H)	Match drawn
Scorecard	240 (102.2 overs); DKH Mitchell 109 (323); DA Cosker 5/39 (29.2 overs)		155 (49 overs); MA Wallace 51* (78); GM Andrew 5/40 (14 overs)	SWALEC Stadium, Cardiff; Umpires: Russell Evans and Michael Gough
Scorecard	296/6d (79 overs); DKH Mitchell 151* (243); DA Cosker 4/94 (27 overs)		229/7 (98.4 overs); WD Bragg 91* (285); JD Shantry 2/25 (18 overs)	SWALEC Stadium, Cardiff; Umpires: Russell Evans and Michael Gough
Glamorgan won the toss and elected to field; Points: Worcestershire 9, Glamorgan 8

4–7 May	Surrey	v	Kent (H)	Kent won by 8 wickets
Scorecard	285 (102.5 overs); JJ Roy 60 (100); AEN Riley 4/77 (24 overs)		435 (112.2 overs); BP Nash 126 (157); MP Dunn 3/104 (27 overs)	St Lawrence Ground, Canterbury; Umpires: Richard Illingworth and Graham Lloyd
Scorecard	203 (87.5 overs); JW Dernbach 24 (30); AEN Riley 5/78 (34.5 overs)		54/2 (9.3 overs); D Bell-Drummond 29* (24); MP Dunn 3/104 (27 overs)	St Lawrence Ground, Canterbury; Umpires: Richard Illingworth and Graham Lloyd
Surrey won the toss and elected to bat; Points: Kent 24, Surrey 5

11–14 May	(H) Derbyshire	v	Kent	Match drawn
Scorecard	118 (49.3 overs); AL Hughes 36* (85); DI Stevens 5/24 (20.3 overs)		235/6d (47.2 overs); BP Nash 95* (98); T Groenewald 2/59 (11 overs)	County Ground, Derby; Umpires: Steve Garratt and Peter Willey
Scorecard	106/0 (28 overs); S Moore 73* (93)			County Ground, Derby; Umpires: Steve Garratt and Peter Willey
Kent won the toss and elected to field; First-class debut: Scott Elstone (Derbyshire) No play on Day 1 due to rain; Points: Kent 9, Derbyshire 7

11–14 May	Glamorgan	v	Hampshire (H)	Hampshire won by 6 wickets
Scorecard	224 (61.2 overs); MA Wallace 67* (70); SM Ervine 3/36 (11 overs)		345 (110 overs); MA Carberry 66 (130); J Allenby 4/67 (25 overs)	The Rose Bowl, Southampton; Umpires: Steve O'Shaughnessy and Alex Wharf
Scorecard	187 (68.4 overs); WD Bragg 74 (124); JA Tomlinson 3/40 (14.4 overs)		68/4 (15 overs); JM Vince 29* (34); RAJ Smith 3/38 (8 overs)	The Rose Bowl, Southampton; Umpires: Steve O'Shaughnessy and Alex Wharf
Hampshire won the toss and elected to field; Points: Hampshire 22, Glamorgan 4

11–14 May	Gloucestershire	v	Surrey (H)	Surrey won by 4 wickets
Scorecard	168 (56.4 overs); WA Tavaré 59 (124); MP Dunn 5/48 (17.4 overs)		132 (48.3 overs); JJ Roy 44 (65); JK Fuller 6/47 (16.4 overs)	The Oval, London; Umpires: Rob Bailey and Martin Bodenham
Scorecard	230 (62.3 overs); CDJ Dent 54 (105); CT Tremlett 6/59 (16 overs)		267/6 (82.4 overs); GC Smith 103 (112); MD Taylor 2/48 (16 overs)	The Oval, London; Umpires: Rob Bailey and Martin Bodenham
Surrey won the toss and elected to field; Points: Surrey 19, Gloucestershire 3

18–21 May	(H) Gloucestershire	v	Kent	Gloucestershire won by 290 runs
Scorecard	252 (78.4 overs); GH Roderick 59 (84); AEN Riley 3/51 (21 overs)		114 (46 overs); SW Billings 42 (107); WRS Gidman 4/14 (12 overs)	County Ground, Bristol; Umpires: Ian Gould and George Sharp
Scorecard	443/6d (103 overs); HJH Marshall 118 (243); DI Stevens 5/87 (21 overs)		291 (92.4 overs); BW Harmison 125 (218); WRS Gidman 3/54 (20 overs)	County Ground, Bristol; Umpires: Ian Gould and George Sharp
Gloucestershire won the toss and elected to bat; Points: Gloucestershire 21, Kent 3

18–21 May	Hampshire	v	Leicestershire (H)	Hampshire won by 278 runs
Scorecard	332 (100.1 overs); JM Vince 70 (88); NL Buck 5/84 (22 overs)		296 (89.2 overs); RR Sarwan 60 (81); JA Tomlinson 4/49 (18.2 overs)	Grace Road, Leicester; Umpires: Stephen Gale and Jeremy Lloyds
Scorecard	338/9d (90 overs); MT Coles 83 (77); CE Shreck 3/85 (25 overs)		96 (31.4 overs); GP Smith 39 (85); DR Briggs 4/13 (8.4 overs)	Grace Road, Leicester; Umpires: Stephen Gale and Jeremy Lloyds
Hampshire won the toss and elected to bat; Points: Hampshire 22, Leicestershire 5

18–20 May	(H) Worcestershire	v	Essex	Worcestershire won by 72 runs
Scorecard	291 (74.5 overs); DKH Mitchell 97 (128); JD Ryder 2/25 (5 overs)		203 (75.2 overs); JD Ryder 45 (81); Saeed Ajmal 6/75 (26.2 overs)	New Road, Worcester; Umpires: Ben Debenham and Neil Mallender
Scorecard	120 (46.4 overs); DKH Mitchell 38 (46); MS Panesar 5/23 (18.4 overs)		136 (40.5 overs); BT Foakes 34 (54); Saeed Ajmal 7/19 (13.5 overs)	New Road, Worcester; Umpires: Ben Debenham and Neil Mallender
Worcestershire won the toss and elected to bat; Points: Worcestershire 21, Essex 4

25–28 May	(H) Derbyshire	v	Gloucestershire	Match drawn
Scorecard	278 (106 overs); SL Elstone 63 (158); WRS Gidman 4/50 (25 overs)		66/4 (25.5 overs); WA Tavaré 22 (44); MHA Footitt 2/28 (9.5 overs)	County Ground, Derby; Umpires: Jeff Evans and Peter Hartley
Gloucestershire won the toss and elected to field; Points: Derbyshire 8, Gloucestershire 8

25–28 May	(H) Essex	v	Surrey	Match drawn
Scorecard	228 (73.2 overs); T Westley 95 (150); GJ Batty 8/68 (27 overs)		261/7 (109 overs); A Harinath 63 (231); MS Panesar 2/54 (30 overs)	County Ground, Chelmsford; Umpires: Mark Benson and Martin Saggers
Essex won the toss and elected to bat; First-class debut: Thomas Moore (Essex) No play on Day 4 due to rain; Points: Surrey 10, Essex 8

25–28 May	Leicestershire	v	Glamorgan (H)	Match drawn
Scorecard	109 (38 overs); NJ O'Brien 17 (22); J Allenby 3/20 (13 overs)		350/8d (105 overs); JA Rudolph 88 (178); CE Shreck 3/64 (27 overs)	SWALEC Stadium, Cardiff; Umpires: Martin Bodenham and Nigel Cowley
Scorecard	204/8 (89 overs); AJ Robson 81 (181); MG Hogan 3/41 (19 overs)			SWALEC Stadium, Cardiff; Umpires: Martin Bodenham and Nigel Cowley
Glamorgan won the toss and elected to field; Points: Glamorgan 12, Leicestershire 7

25–28 May	(H) Kent	v	Worcestershire	Match drawn
Scorecard	258 (96.4 overs); SA Northeast 53 (132); J Leach 5/36 (12.4 overs)		67/0 (17 overs); DKH Mitchell 33* (55)	Nevill Ground, Tunbridge Wells; Umpires: Jeremy Lloyds and Steve O'Shaughnessy
Kent won the toss and elected to bat; No play on Day 4 due to rain; Points: Worcestershire 8, Kent 7

==== June ====
1–4 June	Glamorgan	v	(H) Essex	Match drawn
Scorecard	244 (95.2 overs); WD Bragg 93 (214); RJW Topley 6/41 (20.2 overs)		280 (87.3 overs); JS Foster 86 (139); MG Hogan 3/59 (25 overs)	County Ground, Chelmsford; Umpires: Steve O'Shaughnessy and George Sharp
Scorecard	250 (84.1 overs); J Allenby 79 (135); RJW Topley 4/67 (29 overs)		28/2 (6 overs); T Westley 11* (11); MG Hogan 2/15 (3 overs)	County Ground, Chelmsford; Umpires: Steve O'Shaughnessy and George Sharp
Glamorgan won the toss and elected to bat; Points: Essex 10, Glamorgan 9

1–4 June	(H) Hampshire	v	Derbyshire	Match drawn
Scorecard	388 (110.5 overs); AJA Wheater 87 (87); AP Palladino 4/97 (28 overs)		257 (102.3 overs); AP Palladino 60* (87); DR Briggs 5/50 (28.3 overs)	The Rose Bowl, Southampton; Umpires: Nigel Cowley and Peter Willey
Scorecard	214/5d (56 overs); JHK Adams 67 (127); SL Elstone 2/33 (5 overs)		107/8 (52 overs); SC Moore 25 (51); JA Tomlinson 3/16 (11 overs)	The Rose Bowl, Southampton; Umpires: Nigel Cowley and Peter Willey
Derbyshire won the toss and elected to field; Points: Hampshire 12, Derbyshire 10

1–4 June	Worcestershire	v	(H) Surrey	Match drawn
Scorecard	476 (137 overs); MM Ali 162 (277); CT Tremlett 3/61 (28 overs)		206 (88.5 overs); RJ Burns 79 (171); JD Shantry 6/53 (25.5 overs)	The Oval, London; Umpires: Richard Kettleborough and Alex Wharf
Scorecard			240/5 (87 overs) (f/o); SM Davies 77 (158); J Leach 1/18 (9 overs)	The Oval, London; Umpires: Richard Kettleborough and Alex Wharf
Worcestershire won the toss and elected to bat; Points: Worcestershire 12, Surrey 7

2–5 June	(H) Leicestershire	v	Gloucestershire	Gloucestershire won by 9 wickets
Scorecard	269 (88.4 overs); NJ O'Brien 88 (159); WRS Gidman 5/46 (20 overs)		260 (75.2 overs); GO Jones 93 (75); RML Taylor 5/55 (16 overs)	Grace Road, Leicester; Umpires: David Millns and Martin Saggers
Scorecard	241/5d (60.4 overs); AJ Robson 96 (186); TMJ Smith 2/44 (10.4 overs)		255/1 (37.2 overs); M Klinger 129* (124); RML Taylor 1/65 (9 overs)	Grace Road, Leicester; Umpires: David Millns and Martin Saggers
Leicestershire won the toss and elected to bat; No play on Day 3 due to rain; Points: Gloucestershire 21, Leicestershire 5

7–10 June	(H) Kent	v	Essex	Match drawn
Scorecard	387 (112 overs); DI Stevens 105 (99); JD Ryder 5/54 (23 overs)		440 (118 overs); RS Bopara 162 (294); ME Claydon 5/82 (27 overs)	St Lawrence Ground, Canterbury; Umpires: Nick Cook and Nigel Llong
Scorecard	255/8d (91 overs); DJ Bell-Drummond 92 (257); JD Ryder 5/56 (22 overs)			St Lawrence Ground, Canterbury; Umpires: Nick Cook and Nigel Llong
Kent won the toss and elected to bat; Points: Essex 13, Kent 11

8–11 June	(H) Leicestershire	v	Derbyshire	Derbyshire won by 9 wickets
Scorecard	311 (84.1 overs); NJ O'Brien 89 (128); MHA Footitt 6/65 (16.1 overs)		336 (120 overs); DJ Wainwright 109 (200); BA Raine 3/50 (26 overs)	Grace Road, Leicester; Umpires: Richard Kettleborough and Graham Lloyd
Scorecard	210 (82.2 overs); NJ O'Brien 71 (141); DJ Wainwright 5/54 (26 overs)		188/1 (61.5 overs); PM Borrington 86* (190); RML Taylor 1/11 (9 overs)	Grace Road, Leicester; Umpires: Richard Kettleborough and Graham Lloyd
Leicestershire won the toss and elected to bat; Match postponed from 6 April; First-class debut: Tom Taylor (Derbyshire)

8–11 June	(H) Worcestershire	v	Hampshire	Match drawn
Scorecard	402/9d (118 overs); OB Cox 104 (186); DJ Balcombe 3/53 (22 overs)		219 (66.5 overs); WR Smith 67 (135); Saeed Ajmal 7/63 (21.5 overs)	New Road, Worcester; Umpires: Martin Bodenham and Neil Mallender
Scorecard			321/5d (92 overs) (f/o); MA Carberry 125 (249); CAJ Morris 3/57 (24 overs)	New Road, Worcester; Umpires: Martin Bodenham and Neil Mallender
Worcestershire won the toss and elected to bat; Points: Worcestershire 12, Hampshire 8

9–12 June	(H) Gloucestershire	v	Surrey	Match drawn
Scorecard	112 (31.4 overs); GO Jones 28 (45); MP Dunn 4/37 (12 overs)		626/6d (155 overs); RJ Burns 199 (375); WRS Gidman 2/75 (27 overs)	County Ground, Bristol; Umpires: Tim Robinson and Billy Taylor
Scorecard	506/6 (189 overs); IA Cockbain 151* (421); GJ Batty 2/96 (55 overs)			County Ground, Bristol; Umpires: Tim Robinson and Billy Taylor
Gloucestershire won the toss and elected to bat; Points: Surrey 12, Gloucestershire 5

15–18 June	(H) Derbyshire	v	Surrey	Surrey won by 10 wickets
Scorecard	153 (49.4 overs); MJ North 44 (67); TK Curran 5/51 (17.4 overs)		421 (113.4 overs); SM Davies 124 (166 overs); MHA Footitt 4/63 (23.4 overs)	County Ground, Derby; Umpires: David Millns and Martin Saggers
Scorecard	288 (102.4 overs); DJ Wainwright 56* (91); GJ Batty 4/69 (36 overs)		21/0 (5.5 overs); ZS Ansari 15* (20)	County Ground, Derby; Umpires: David Millns and Martin Saggers
Derbyshire won the toss and elected to bat; Points: Surrey 23, Derbyshire 2

15–18 June	Kent	v	(H) Glamorgan	Glamorgan won by an innings and 11 runs
Scorecard	253 (102.4 overs); RWT Key 63 (147); MG Hogan 5/58 (26.4 overs)		527 (141.2 overs); JA Rudolph 103 (170); AEN Riley 5/157 (42 overs)	SWALEC Stadium, Cardiff; Umpires: Nigel Cowley and Alex Wharf
Scorecard	263 (71 overs); DI Stevens 60 (57); MG Hogan 5/67 (17 overs)			SWALEC Stadium, Cardiff; Umpires: Nigel Cowley and Alex Wharf
Kent won the toss and elected to bat; Points: Glamorgan 24, Kent 3

15–17 June	(H) Hampshire	v	Essex	Hampshire won by 470 runs
Scorecard	286 (78.4 overs); AJA Wheater 42 (47); RS Bopara 3/14 (9 overs)		121 (43.1 overs); JS Foster 36 (55); KJ Abbott 5/44 (15.1 overs)	The Rose Bowl, Southampton; Umpires: Rob Bailey and Jeff Evans
Scorecard	440/3d (90 overs); JM Vince 240 (222); RJW Topley 2/75 (14 overs)		135 (39.1 overs); RS Bopara 39 (53); KJ Abbott 3/23 (9 overs)	The Rose Bowl, Southampton; Umpires: Rob Bailey and Jeff Evans
Essex won the toss and elected to field; Points: Hampshire 21, Essex 3

15–18 June	Worcestershire	v	(H) Leicestershire	Worcestershire won by 234 runs
Scorecard	237 (67.4 overs); AN Kervezee 102 (142 overs); CE Shreck 3/65 (20.4 overs)		278 (89.2 overs); JJ Cobb 63 (108); CAJ Morris 4/76 (22.2 overs)	Grace Road, Leicester; Umpires: Steve Garratt and Nigel Llong
Scorecard	444/8d (112.4 overs); TC Fell 124 (245); NL Buck 5/123 (27.4 overs)		169 (51 overs); DJ Redfern 39 (64); Saeed Ajmal 6/19 (14 overs)	Grace Road, Leicester; Umpires: Steve Garratt and Nigel Llong
Leicestershire won the toss and elected to field; Points: Worcestershire 20, Leicestershire 5

21–24 June	(H) Gloucestershire	v	Glamorgan	Match drawn
Scorecard	391 (131.5 overs); HJH Marshall 109 (173); MG Hogan 4/57 (27 overs)		615/7d (159 overs); JA Rudolph 139 (266); TMJ Smith 3/183 (52 overs)	County Ground, Bristol; Umpires: Steve Garratt and Richard Kettleborough
Scorecard	165/5 (84 overs); WRS Gidman 47* (86); GG Wagg 2/22 (13 overs)			County Ground, Bristol; Umpires: Steve Garratt and Richard Kettleborough
Gloucestershire won the toss and elected to bat; First-class debut: Patrick Grieshaber (Gloucestershire); Points: Glamorgan 12, Gloucestershire 9

22–24 June	(H) Kent	v	Derbyshire	Kent won by 10 wickets
Scorecard	333 (120.3 overs); DJ Bell-Drummond 101 (268); AP Palladino 5/62 (30 overs)		115 (48 overs); AP Palladino 24 (63); AEN Riley 4/30 (16 overs)	St Lawrence Ground, Canterbury; Umpires: Rob Bailey and Martin Bodenham
Scorecard	41/0 (10.1 overs); RWT Key 26* (29)		256 (92.1 overs) (f/o); AL Hughes 82 (174); DI Stevens 6/64 (30 overs)	St Lawrence Ground, Canterbury; Umpires: Rob Bailey and Martin Bodenham
Kent won the toss and elected to bat; Points: Kent 22, Derbyshire 2

22–25 June	(H) Surrey	v	Leicestershire	Surrey won by 10 wickets
Scorecard	522/9d (152 overs); GC Wilson 160* (296); RML Taylor 3/81 (27 overs)		271 (85.1 overs); AJ Robson 75 (112); CT Tremlett 3/28 (14.3 overs)	The Oval, London; Umpires: Neil Mallender and Alex Wharf
Scorecard	69/0 (14.1 overs); RJ Burns 40* (41)		319 (101 overs) (f/o); AJ Robson 81 (132); ZS Ansari 5/93 (36 overs)	The Oval, London; Umpires: Neil Mallender and Alex Wharf
Surrey won the toss and elected to bat; Points: Surrey 23, Leicestershire 4

28 June – 1 July	(H) Surrey	v	Hampshire	Match drawn
Scorecard	474/8d (124 overs); JJ Roy 114 (114); DR Briggs 3/144 (35 overs)		354 (139.2 overs); WR Smith 82 (257); GJ Batty 3/74 (41 overs)	The Oval, London; Umpires: Stephen Gale and Richard Kettleborough
Scorecard	13/0d (8 overs); RJ Burns 9* (28)			The Oval, London; Umpires: Stephen Gale and Richard Kettleborough
Surrey won the toss and elected to bat; Points: Surrey 12, Hampshire 9

29 June – 2 July	Gloucestershire	v	(H) Essex	Essex won by 10 wickets
Scorecard	224 (57.4 overs); DA Payne 48* (57); RJW Topley 5/53 (16 overs)		541 (145.3 overs); RS Bopara 147 (302); JMR Taylor 4/125 (30.3 overs)	County Ground, Chelmsford; Umpires: Paul Baldwin and Michael Gough
Scorecard	325 (120.4 overs); APR Gidman 53 (107); JD Ryder 4/43 (23 overs)		10/0 (1.3 overs); NLJ Browne 9* (5)	County Ground, Chelmsford; Umpires: Paul Baldwin and Michael Gough
Essex won the toss and elected to field; Points: Essex 24, Gloucestershire 2

29 June – 2 July	(H) Worcestershire	v	Glamorgan	Worcestershire won by 249 runs
Scorecard	352 (114.1 overs); TC Fell 133 (246); MG Hogan 4/73 (27 over)		297 (92.2 overs); JA Rudolph 88 (187); Saeed Ajmal 5/106 (34.2 overs)	New Road, Worcester; Umpires: Mark Benson and Graham Lloyd
Scorecard	299/7d MM Ali 80 (87); DA Cosker 5/97 (25 overs)		105 (51.4 overs); J Allenby 35 (52); Saeed Ajmal 7/34 (17.4 overs)	New Road, Worcester; Umpires: Mark Benson and Graham Lloyd
Worcestershire won the toss and elected to bat; First-class debut: Richard Oliver (Worcestershire); Points: Worcestershire 22, Glamorgan 4

==== July ====
6–9 July	(H) Glamorgan	v	Surrey	Surrey won by 9 wickets
Scorecard	232 (53.4 overs); J Allenby 69 (84); CT Tremlett 5/60 (16.4 overs)		598/8d ZS Ansari 112 (319); J Allenby 2/77 (32 overs)	Penrhyn Avenue, Rhos-on-Sea, Colwyn Bay; Umpires: Jeff Evans and Peter Willey
Scorecard	398 (118.5 overs); CB Cooke 83* (183); MP Dunn 4/124 (28 overs)		43/1 (12.5 overs); A Harinath 19* (36); WT Owen 1/15 (6 overs)	Penrhyn Avenue, Rhos-on-Sea, Colwyn Bay; Umpires: Jeff Evans and Peter Willey
Glamorgan won the toss and elected to bat; Points: Surrey 23, Glamorgan 2

7–10 July	(H) Derbyshire	v	Essex	Match drawn
Scorecard	275 (82.3 overs); WL Madsen 90 (178); GR Napier 4/44 (18.3 overs)		277 (100 overs); NLJ Browne 132* (322); AP Palladino 4/65 (33 overs)	Queen's Park, Chesterfield; Umpires: Graham Lloyd and Steve O'Shaughnessy
Scorecard	368/8d (103.4 overs); S Chanderpaul 92 (171); GR Napier 3/85 (25 overs)		243/4 (52.5 overs); RN ten Doeschate 104* (116); MHA Footitt 3/39 (11 overs)	Queen's Park, Chesterfield; Umpires: Graham Lloyd and Steve O'Shaughnessy
Derbyshire won the toss and elected to bat; Points: Derbyshire 10, Essex 10

7–10 July	(H) Hampshire	v	Gloucestershire	Match drawn
Scorecard	297 (91 overs); DJ Balcombe 65* (97); LC Norwell 4/103 (22 overs)		504/8d (137 overs); WRS Gidman 119 (186); JA Tomlinson 3/110 (31 overs)	The Rose Bowl, Southampton; Umpires: Mike Burns and Jeremy Lloyds
Scorecard	213/6 (72 overs); JM Vince 63 (95); TMJ Smith 2/62 (24 overs)			The Rose Bowl, Southampton; Umpires: Mike Burns and Jeremy Lloyds
Gloucestershire won the toss and elected to field; Points: Gloucestershire 12, Hampshire 8

7–10 July	(H) Leicestershire	v	Kent	Kent won by 6 wickets
Scorecard	217 (55 overs); AJ Robson 56 (80); ME Claydon 5/77 (21 overs)		302 (86.4 overs); ME Claydon 77 (91); NL Buck 4/97 (26 overs)	Grace Road, Leicester; Umpires: Anil Chaudhary and Peter Hartley
Scorecard	388 (103.1 overs); JJ Cobb 137 (243); DI Stevens 5/85 (33.1 overs)		306/4 (68.5 overs); SA Northeast 112* (143); NL Buck 2/68 (17 overs)	Grace Road, Leicester; Umpires: Anil Chaudhary and Peter Hartley
Kent won the toss and elected to field; First-class debut: Charlie Hartley (Kent); Points: Kent 22, Leicestershire 4

13–16 July	Hampshire	v	(H) Essex	Essex won by 2 wickets
Scorecard	246 (71 overs); AJA Wheater 107 (147); SI Mahmood 3/54 (12 overs)		285 (102.1 overs); RS Bopara 79 (254); JA Tomlinson 2/29 (15 overs)	Castle Park Cricket Ground, Colchester; Umpires: Anil Chaudhary and Tim Robinson
Scorecard	171 (47.1 overs); MA Carberry 56 (95); GM Smith 4/46 (12.1 overs)		136/8 (32.3 overs); RS Bopara 48* (91); LA Dawson 4/58 (14.3 overs)	Castle Park Cricket Ground, Colchester; Umpires: Anil Chaudhary and Tim Robinson
Hampshire won the toss and elected to bat; No play on Day 1 due to rain; Points: Essex 21, Hampshire 4

13–16 July	(H) Worcestershire	v	Leicestershire	Worcestershire won by 204 runs
Scorecard	321 (103.3 overs); DKH Mitchell 90 (150); NL Buck 3/65 (19 overs)		280 (71.5 overs); GP Smith 85 (138); Saeed Ajmal 4/66 (28 overs)	New Road, Worcester; Umpires: Martin Saggers and Peter Willey
Scorecard	416/8d (87.1 overs); T Kohler-Cadmore 99 (161); NL Buck 3/80 (17.1 overs)		253 (75.3 overs); NJ O'Brien 57 (79); CAJ Morris 3/53 (19 overs)	New Road, Worcester; Umpires: Martin Saggers and Peter Willey
Worcestershire won the toss and elected to bat; Points: Worcestershire 22, Leicestershire 5

14–17 July	(H) Gloucestershire	v	Derbyshire	Derbyshire won by 6 wickets
Scorecard	356 (118.1 overs); WA Tavaré 135 (269); TAI Taylor 5/58 (23 overs)		372 (119.3 overs); WL Madsen 80 (151); BAC Howell 4/68 (24 overs)	College Ground, Cheltenham; Umpires: Neil Bainton and Mark Benson
Scorecard	219 (73.5 overs); HJH Marshall 71 (191); DJ Wainwright 3/64 (12.5 overs)		208/4 (57.4 overs); BA Godleman 54 (84); TMJ Smith 2/72 (21 overs)	College Ground, Cheltenham; Umpires: Neil Bainton and Mark Benson
Gloucestershire won the toss and elected to bat; Points: Derbyshire 22, Gloucestershire 4

20–22 July	Glamorgan	v	(H) Derbyshire	Derbyshire won by 6 wickets
Scorecard	138 (53.2 overs); MW Goodwin 44 (143); AL Hughes 4/46 (12.2 overs)		241 (77.1 overs); WJ Durston 50 (57); MG Hogan 5/63 (21.1 overs)	County Ground, Derby; Umpires: Nick Cook and Tim Robinson
Scorecard	175 (49.2 overs); WT Owen 28 (22); MHA Footitt 6/48 (15 overs)		73/4 (24.3 overs); BT Slater 20 (60); MG Hogan 2/17 (9 overs)	County Ground, Derby; Umpires: Nick Cook and Tim Robinson
Derbyshire won the toss and elected to field; Points: Derbyshire 20, Glamorgan 3

20–23 July	Kent	v	(H) Surrey	Kent won by 89 runs
Scorecard	408 (110 overs); SA Northeast 91 (153); SC Meaker 4/106 (34 overs)		398 (109.4 overs); JJ Roy 84 (115); DI Stevens 4/110 (32 overs)	Woodbridge Road, Guildford; Umpires: Rob Bailey and Paul Baldwin
Scorecard	292 (83.2 overs); RWT Key 59 (114); SC Meaker 7/90 (28.2 overs)		213 (53.5 overs); TM Dilshan 68 (64); DI Stevens 5/68 (20.5 overs)	Woodbridge Road, Guildford; Umpires: Rob Bailey and Paul Baldwin
Surrey won the toss and elected to field; Points: Kent 24, Surrey 7

21–23 July	Worcestershire	v	(H) Gloucestershire	Worcestershire won by 8 wickets
Scorecard	395 (117.3 overs); DKH Mitchell 167* (299); CN Miles 5/90 (23 overs)		156 (64.4 overs); TMJ Smith 41* (78); J Leach 2/17 (9.4 overs)	College Ground, Cheltenham; Umpires: Stephen Gale and George Sharp
Scorecard	51/2 (7.4 overs); RK Oliver 18 (10); BAC Howell 1/7 (2 overs)		289 (84.5 overs) (f/o); LC Norwell 78 (102); JD Shantry 4/52 (21 overs)	College Ground, Cheltenham; Umpires: Stephen Gale and George Sharp
Worcestershire won the toss and elected to bat; Points: Worcestershire 23, Gloucestershire 3

==== August ====
15–18 August	Essex	v	(H) Glamorgan	Essex won by 63 runs
Scorecard	286 (81.5 overs); NLJ Browne 73 (194); J Allenby 5/56 (15.5 overs)		161 (60.5 overs); J Allenby 56* (126); MS Panesar 5/50 (28 overs)	St. Helen's, Swansea; Umpires: Paul Baldwin and Alex Wharf
Scorecard	222 (66 overs); RN ten Doeschate 63* (122); MG Hogan 4/55 (18 overs)		284 (98.2 overs); GG Wagg 64 (125); MS Panesar 6/118 (45 overs)	St. Helen's, Swansea; Umpires: Paul Baldwin and Alex Wharf
Essex won the toss and elected to bat; Points: Essex 21, Glamorgan 3

15–18 August	Hampshire	v	(H) Kent	Hampshire won by 196 runs
Scorecard	380 (107.1 overs); SM Ervine 75 (112); ME Claydon 3/72 (25 overs)		191 (55.1 overs); DI Stevens 64 (68); CP Wood 5/39 (14 overs)	St Lawrence Ground, Canterbury; Umpires: Ben Debenham and Michael Gough
Scorecard	311/5d (84.4 overs); JHK Adams 97 (198); FK Cowdrey 3/59 (12.4 overs)		304 (88.4 overs); DI Stevens 74 (81); MT Coles 3/68 (21 overs)	St Lawrence Ground, Canterbury; Umpires: Ben Debenham and Michael Gough
Hampshire won the toss and elected to bat; Points: Hampshire 23, Kent 3

15–18 August	Surrey	v	(H) Leicestershire	Match drawn
Scorecard	480 (108.3 overs); SM Davies 174 (210); RML Taylor 4/91 (20.3 overs)		373 (92 overs); NJ O'Brien 89* (172); GJ Batty 3/38 (24 overs)	Grace Road, Leicester; Umpires: Nigel Cowley and Paul Pollard
Scorecard	279/5d RJ Burns 102 (185); JKH Naik 3/85 (25 overs)		232/6 (56 overs); DJ Redfern 64 (72); SC Meaker 4/146 (21 overs)	Grace Road, Leicester; Umpires: Nigel Cowley and Paul Pollard
Leicestershire won the toss and elected to field; Points: Surrey 13, Leicestershire 12

15–17 August	(H) Worcestershire	v	Gloucestershire	Gloucestershire won by 7 wickets
Scorecard	194 (51.4 overs); RK Oliver 52 (52); CN Miles 4/54 (12 overs)		378 (100.4 overs); APR Gidman 146 (232); J Leach 4/100 (22.4 overs)	New Road, Worcester; Umpires: Mike Burns and Peter Willey
Scorecard	360 (92.1 overs); RK Oliver 179 (212); LC Norwell 4/69 (20.1 overs)		178/3 (35.3 overs); CDJ Dent 51 (51); J Leach 2/42 (10 overs)	New Road, Worcester; Umpires: Mike Burns and Peter Willey
Gloucestershire won the toss and elected to field; Points: Gloucestershire 23, Worcestershire 3

31 August–3 September	(H) Derbyshire	v	Worcestershire	Derbyshire won by 138 runs
Scorecard	356 (103.3 overs); AL Hughes 74 (133); CAJ Morris 5/54 (26.3 overs)		385 (134.4 overs); J Leach 71 (42); MHA Footitt 6/115 (28.4 overs)	County Ground, Derby; Umpires: Martin Bodenham and Nick Cook
Scorecard	296 (81.4 overs); WL Madsen 98 (135); MJ McClenaghan 5/78 (18 overs)		129 (46.4 overs); T Kohler-Cadmore 29 (44); WJ Durston 5/19 (13 overs)	County Ground, Derby; Umpires: Martin Bodenham and Nick Cook
Derbyshire won the toss and elected to bat; Points: Derbyshire 22, Worcestershire 6

31 August–3 September	Leicestershire	v	(H) Hampshire	Hampshire won by an innings and 34 runs
Scorecard	303 (98 overs); AJ Robson 115 (265); MT Coles 4/108 (20 overs)		497/8d (104.5 overs); JHK Adams 231 (289); A Sheikh 3/114 (19.5 overs)	The Rose Bowl, Southampton; Umpires: Martin Saggers and Peter Willey
Scorecard	160 (55.3 overs); JJ Cobb 50* (107); SM Ervine 3/22 (8 overs)			The Rose Bowl, Southampton; Umpires: Martin Saggers and Peter Willey
Leicestershire won the toss and elected to bat; Points: Hampshire 24, Leicestershire 5

31 August–3 September	Glamorgan	v	(H) Kent	Match drawn
Scorecard	329 (89.1 overs); CB Cooke 171 (214); ME Claydon 4/47 (20 overs)		387 (132.3 overs); SA Northeast 102 (202); KA Bull 4/62 (25.3 overs)	St Lawrence Ground, Canterbury; Umpires: Neil Bainton and David Millns
Scorecard	415/9d (112.1 overs); GG Wagg 116* (183); ME Claydon 3/36 (15 overs)			St Lawrence Ground, Canterbury; Umpires: Neil Bainton and David Millns
Glamorgan won the toss and elected to bat; First-class debut: Kieran Bull (Glamorgan); Points: Kent 11, Glamorgan 9

==== September ====
9–11 September	Kent	v	(H) Essex	Essex won by 9 wickets
Scorecard	198 (61.4 overs); SA Northeast 117 (151); DD Masters 3/44 (17 overs)		328 (92.1 overs); JS Foster 108 (188); DI Stevens 5/83 (30.1 overs)	County Ground, Chelmsford; Umpires: Stephen Gale and Ian Gould
Scorecard	151 (43.2 overs); BP Nash 34 (37); GR Napier 4/28 (9.2 overs)		22/1 (2.5 overs); T Westley 8* (4); MD Hunn 1/7 (1 over)	County Ground, Chelmsford; Umpires: Stephen Gale and Ian Gould
Kent won the toss and elected to bat; First-class debut: James Porter (Essex); Points: Essex 22, Kent 3

9–11 September	(H) Glamorgan	v	Derbyshire	Glamorgan won by 106 runs
Scorecard	282 (90.1 overs); CB Cooke 74 (159); AP Palladino 3/34 (21 overs)		203 (54.1 overs); WA White 38 (22); J Allenby 3/42 (15.1 overs)	SWALEC Stadium, Cardiff; Umpires: Nigel Llong and Neil Mallender
Scorecard	181 (57.5 overs); J Allenby 43 (74); WA White 4/27 (9 overs)		154 (52.1 overs); WJ Durston 72 (91); MG Hogan 4/38 (15 overs)	SWALEC Stadium, Cardiff; Umpires: Nigel Llong and Neil Mallender
Glamorgan won the toss and elected to bat; Points: Glamorgan 21, Derbyshire 4

9–12 September	(H) Gloucestershire	v	Leicestershire	Match drawn
Scorecard	646 (124.5 overs); APR Gidman 264 (274); A Sheikh 4/97 (20 overs)		565 (149.1 overs); NJ O'Brien 119 (108); CN Miles 3/98 (23 overs)	County Ground, Bristol; Umpires: Steve Garratt and Steve O'Shaughnessy
Scorecard	306/9 (87.3 overs); WRS Gidman 104* (129); CE Shreck 3/44 (16 overs)			County Ground, Bristol; Umpires: Steve Garratt and Steve O'Shaughnessy
Gloucestershire won the toss and elected to bat; Points: Gloucestershire 11, Leicestershire 11

9–12 September	(H) Worcestershire	v	Surrey	Worcestershire won by 27 runs
Scorecard	272 (76.3 overs); J Leach 70 (135); MP Dunn 3/68 (15 overs)		406 (104.1 overs); JJ Roy 103 (105); JD Shantry 6/87 (28.1 overs)	New Road, Worcester; Umpires: Nigel Cowley and Jeff Evans
Scorecard	350 (85.4 overs); JD Shantry 101 (89); JW Dernbach 4/72 (18.4 overs)		189 (75 overs); ZS Ansari 64 (217); JD Shantry 4/44 (24 overs)	New Road, Worcester; Umpires: Nigel Cowley and Jeff Evans
Worcestershire won the toss and elected to bat; Points: Worcestershire 21, Surrey 8

15–18 September	Kent	v	(H) Hampshire	Match drawn
Scorecard	507 (149.4 overs); DJ Bell-Drummond 153 (336); MT Coles 4/84 (31 overs)		351 (104.5 overs); SM Ervine 121 (173); JC Tredwell 4/102 (32.5 overs)	The Rose Bowl, Southampton; Umpires: Nigel Cowley and David Millns
Scorecard			248/9 (95 overs); WR Smith 142* (304); AEN Riley 4/36 (19 overs)	The Rose Bowl, Southampton; Umpires: Nigel Cowley and David Millns
Kent won the toss and elected to bat; First-class debut: Tom Alsop (Hampshire)

15–16 September	(H) Leicestershire	v	Essex	Essex won by an innings and 79 runs
Scorecard	138 (36.4 overs); DJ Redfern 54* (70); JD Ryder 5/50 (14 overs)		334 (103.5 overs); JS Foster 132 (203); RML Taylor 5/67 (25 overs)	Grace Road, Leicester; Umpires: Graham Lloyd and Peter Willey
Scorecard	117 (38.5 overs); JJ Cobb 37 (49); DD Master 3/15 (11.5 overs)			Grace Road, Leicester; Umpires: Graham Lloyd and Peter Willey
Essex won the toss and elected to field; Points: Essex 22, Leicestershire 3

15–17 September	(H) Surrey	v	Derbyshire	Derbyshire won by 8 wickets
Scorecard	181 (53.3 overs); GC Wilson 70 (80); MHA Footitt 6/69 (18 overs)		210 (54.2 overs); WL Madsen 63 (85); SC Meaker 4/39 (12.2 overs)	The Oval, London; Umpires: Martin Bodenham and Tim Robinson
Scorecard	279 (78 overs); JJ Roy 81 (86); MHA Footitt 3/62 (18 overs); DJ Wainwright 3/62 (18 overs)		251/2 (66.4 overs); BA Godleman 104* (183); JW Dernbach 1/26 (13 overs)	The Oval, London; Umpires: Martin Bodenham and Tim Robinson
Derbyshire won the toss and elected to field; First-class debut: Ben Cotton and Harvey Hosein (Derbyshire); Points: Derbyshire 20, Surrey 0 - Surrey were deducted 3 points for a slow over rate

23–25 September	(H) Derbyshire	v	Leicestershire	Derbyshire won by 408 runs
Scorecard	289 (73.4 overs); BT Slater 104 (209); BA Raine 3/47 (15 overs)		141 (50.4 overs); BA Raine 34 (61); BD Cotton 4/20 (7.4 overs)	County Ground, Derby; Umpires: Jeff Evans and Martin Saggers
Scorecard	372/3d (93.2 overs); BT Slater 119 (268); DJ Redfern 1/17 (6 overs)		112 (29.4 overs); BA Raine 33* (52); MHA Footitt 5/34 (8 overs)	County Ground, Derby; Umpires: Jeff Evans and Martin Saggers
Leicestershire won the toss and elected to field; Points: Derbyshire 21, Leicestershire 3

23–25 September	Worcestershire	v	(H) Essex	Essex won by an innings and 92 runs
Scorecard	84 (26.2 overs); J Leach 39 (30); J Ryder 5/24 (10 overs)		431 (128 overs); J Ryder 120 (117); CAJ Morris 3/75 (28 overs)	County Ground, Chelmsford; Umpires: Neil Mallender and Steve O'Shaughnessy
Scorecard	255 (73.1 overs); MM Ali 98 (155); GR Napier 5/54 (18 overs)			County Ground, Chelmsford; Umpires: Neil Mallender and Steve O'Shaughnessy
Essex won the toss and elected to field; Points: Essex 22, Worcestershire 2

23–25 September	Hampshire	v	(H) Glamorgan	Hampshire won by 291 runs
Scorecard	357 (93.4 overs); JM Vince 144 (214); J Allenby 4/74 (20 overs)		172 (53.3 overs); MA Wallace 51 (113); CP Wood 4/42 (11 overs)	SWALEC Stadium, Cardiff; Umpires: Graham Lloyd and Jeremy Lloyds
Scorecard	258/9d (55 overs); JHK Adams 91 (121); J Allenby 6/54 (17 overs)		152 (33.4 overs); AHT Donald 59 (60); JA Tomlinson 6/48 (11 overs)	SWALEC Stadium, Cardiff; Umpires: Graham Lloyd and Jeremy Lloyds
Hampshire won the toss and elected to bat; First-class debut: Aneurin Donald (Glamorgan); Points: Hampshire 23, Glamorgan 3

23–26 September	Gloucestershire	v	(H) Kent	Gloucestershire won by 244 runs
Scorecard	179 (57 overs); DA Payne 54* (89); ME Claydon 5/61 (20 overs)		164 (63.4 overs); SW Billings 73 (118); CN Miles 3/20 (13 overs)	St Lawrence Ground, Canterbury; Umpires: Neil Bainton and Steve Garratt
Scorecard	432 (115.3 overs); APR Gidman 140 (178); DA Griffiths 6/63 (21.3 overs)		203 (57.1 overs); SA Northeast 62 (114); TMJ Smith 4/35 (10.1 overs)	St Lawrence Ground, Canterbury; Umpires: Neil Bainton and Steve Garratt
Gloucestershire won the toss and elected to bat; Points: Gloucestershire 19, Kent 3

== Statistics ==
=== Division One ===
==== Most runs ====
Player	Team	Matches	Innings	Runs	Average	HS	100s	50s
Adam Lyth	Yorkshire	16	23	1489	67.68	251	6	6
Ed Joyce	Sussex	14	23	1398	66.57	164*	7	3
Chris Rogers	Middlesex	15	28	1333	55.54	241*	4	4
Riki Wessels	Nottinghamshire	16	29	1197	47.88	158	1	8
Ashwell Prince	Lancashire	16	28	1160	42.96	257*	3	3

==== Most wickets ====
Player	Team	Matches	Overs	Wickets	Average	BBI	5W
Steve Magoffin	Sussex	15	539.0	72	19.51	6/60	4
Jack Brooks	Yorkshire	16	523.2	68	28.02	5/36	2
Chris Rushworth	Durham	16	488.1	64	24.65	9/52	3
Jeetan Patel	Warwickshire	16	536.2	59	26.32	5/49	1
Tim Murtagh	Middlesex	14	527.4	58	28.37	6/60	5

=== Division Two ===
==== Most runs ====
Player	Team	Matches	Innings	Runs	Average	HS	100s	50s
James Vince	Hampshire	16	28	1525	61.00	240	4	7
Daryl Mitchell	Worcestershire	16	27	1334	58.00	172*	5	4
Alex Gidman	Gloucestershire	16	29	1277	47.29	264	4	3
James Adams	Hampshire	16	29	1215	43.39	231	1	8
Will Smith	Hampshire	16	27	1187	51.60	151*	2	6

==== Most wickets ====
Player	Team	Matches	Overs	Wickets	Average	BBI	5W
Mark Footitt	Derbyshire	16	468.2	82	19.12	6/48	6
Saeed Ajmal	Worcestershire	9	417.3	63	16.47	7/19	6
Michael Hogan	Glamorgan	13	444.5	63	19.55	5/58	3
Jack Shantry	Worcestershire	16	497.0	56	23.85	6/53	2
Darren Stevens	Kent	16	515.4	56	27.08	6/64	6

== See also ==
- 2014 Royal London One-Day Cup
- 2014 NatWest t20 Blast
