= Grieshaber =

Grieshaber is a German surname. Notable people with the surname include:

- HAP Grieshaber (1909–1981), German artist
- Patrick Grieshaber (born 1996), English cricketer
- Robert Grieshaber (1846–1928), Swiss politician
