= Nick Browne (cricketer) =

English cricketer (born 1991)

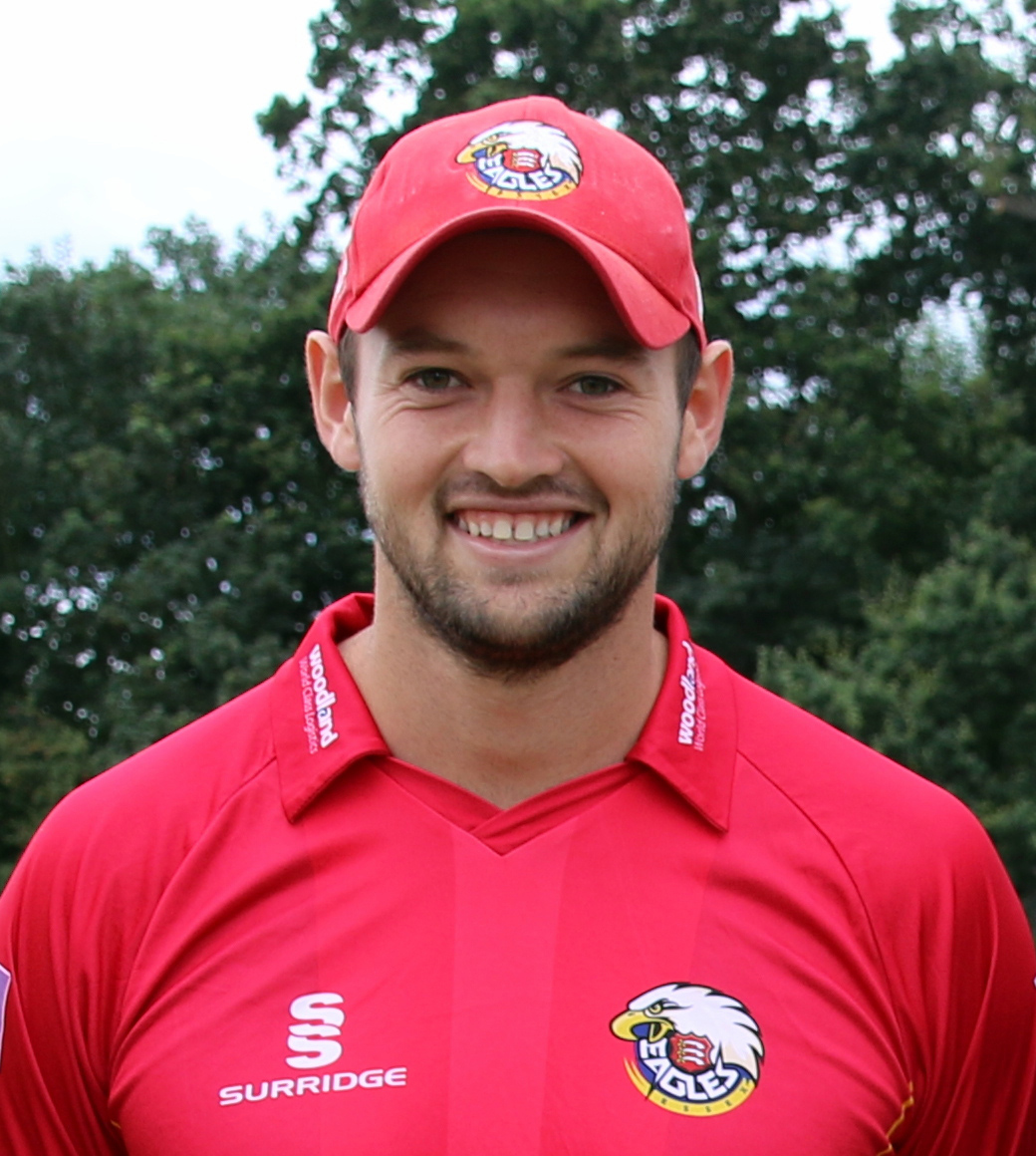

Personal information
- Full name: Nicholas Laurence Joseph Browne
- Born: 24 March 1991 (age 35); Leytonstone, London, England
- Batting: Left-handed
- Bowling: Right-arm leg break

Domestic team information
- Years: Team
- 2013–2025: Essex (squad no. 10)
- 2016: Marylebone Cricket Club (MCC)
- First-class debut: 28 May 2013 Essex v Worcestershire
- List A debut: 27 July 2015 Essex v Lancashire

Career statistics
Competition	FC	LA	T20
Matches	144	36	14
Runs scored	7,922	799	165
Batting average	35.84	25.77	16.50
100s/50s	20/32	0/4	0/0
Top score	255	99	38
Balls bowled	278	–	–
Wickets	0	–	–
Bowling average	–	–	–
5 wickets in innings	–	–	–
10 wickets in match	–	–	–
Best bowling	–	–	–
Catches/stumpings	107/–	13/1	6/–
- Source: ESPNcricinfo, 25 September 2025

Nicholas Laurence Joseph Browne (born 24 March 1991) is an English former professional cricketer turned cricket coach. A left-handed batsman, he who played for Essex.

He studied at Trinity Catholic High School, Woodford Green, and has played for South Woodford CC since childhood, progressing from their youth teams into their 1st XI.

He played for a number of seasons for Essex's 2nd XI, scoring over 1000 runs for the Essex 2nd XI that year and eventually this led to his call up to the first team. Making his first-class debut in May 2013 against Worcestershire, he scored three and took 0–59 in a rain-affected draw.

Browne scored his maiden first-class fifty in June 2014 in a County Championship game against Gloucestershire. He scored 65 in a partnership of 139 with fellow opener Tom Westley. His maiden First-Class century came the following week against Derbyshire at Chesterfield, when he was unbeaten on 132*, the highest score ever made by an Essex opener carrying his bat. In the second innings he scored 100* to become the first Essex player since Ravi Bopara in 2010 to score a century in both innings of a match. He spent every minute of the match on the pitch. In the final fixture of the 2014 season he scored 118 against Worcestershire at Chelmsford.

At The Oval on 27 April 2015 Browne made his highest First Class score to date, scoring 143 against Surrey. In a County Championship match versus Lancashire at Old Trafford on 9 July he scored 105 in the first innings, and 50 in the second innings as Essex were made to follow on. He continued his run of good form with his sixth Championship century against Glamorgan making 129 in an opening stand of 237 with Liam Dawson at Chelmsford on 14 July 2015. The following day he was awarded his County Cap during the lunch interval.

Browne became the first Essex player to reach 1,000 First-Class runs in a season since Bopara achieved the feat in 2008. He brought up the milestone on day four of the match against Leicestershire during a then career-best knock of 151* in the second innings.

He continued his fine form the following winter playing 1st grade cricket in Australia for Mosman CC, scoring a double century (206) that beat the previous highest score by an English batsman in 1st grade cricket, but fell just short of breaking the Australian record of 210 in a first grade game.

Upon his return to county cricket in 2016 he struck 87 in the first innings against Cambridge University followed by 100 in the second innings. In the first County Championship Division Two game of the season he helped Essex to a 10-wicket win over Gloucestershire with a second innings 55* not out.

In the Championship match versus Derbyshire in May 2016, he scored his maiden first-class double century, finally falling for 255.

In 2017 Browne played an important role in helping Essex win the Championship, scoring solid runs and averaging over 40. However, 2018 proved disappointing with an average of 24 and no centuries. In November 2024, having amassed almost 9,000 runs across all formats, Browne signed a new one-year contract with Essex. He announced his retirement from professional cricket in September 2025.

In December 2025, Browne was named as lead batting coach for Essex Women.
