= Greg Smith (cricketer, born 1988) =

English cricketer

Personal information
- Full name: Greg Phillip Smith
- Born: 16 November 1988 (age 37); Leicester, Leicestershire, England
- Batting: Right-handed
- Bowling: Right-arm leg break

Domestic team information
- Years: Team
- 2008–2014: Leicestershire (squad no. 14)
- 2013: Lankan Cricket Club
- 2014: Badureliya Sports Club
- 2015: Colombo Cricket Club
- 2015–2017: Nottinghamshire (squad no. 22)
- 2015: → Leicestershire (on loan)

Career statistics
Competition	FC	LA	T20
Matches	105	48	48
Runs scored	4,963	1,130	1,108
Batting average	26.97	26.90	27.70
100s/50s	8/22	2/5	1/7
Top score	158*	135*	102
Balls bowled	36	–	–
Wickets	1	–	–
Bowling average	73.00	–	–
5 wickets in innings	0	–	–
10 wickets in match	0	–	–
Best bowling	1/64	–	–
Catches/stumpings	86/–	16/–	18/–
- Source: ESPNcricinfo, 22 April 2017

Gregory Philip Smith (born 16 November 1988 in Leicester) is an English former cricketer. He was a right-handed opening batsman and occasional leg break bowler who last played for Nottinghamshire.

He attended Oundle School and then studied at Durham University, where he represented Durham UCCE.

In 2008, Smith represented the English U-19 cricket team against New Zealand, scoring 157 and 150 not out in the test matches and 81 in a Youth ODI.

Smith came through the junior set up at Leicestershire, and topped the first-class national batting averages in 2010. He continued to flourish in 2011, regularly batting in the number 3 position.

Smith and Josh Cobb hold the record for the best opening partnership in a limited overs match, for Leicestershire. The pair scored 235 against Somerset in May 2013, both scoring centuries.

He announced his retirement from the game in July 2017. Since retiring from cricket he qualified as a teacher. He taught in North London for 3 years before moving to teach at Shrewsbury School in Shropshire.

== Career Best Performances ==
as of 27 September 2013

	Batting				Bowling			
	Score	Fixture	Venue	Season	Score	Fixture	Venue	Season
FC	158*	Leicestershire v Gloucestershire	Leicester	2010	1-64	Leicestershire v Gloucestershire	Leicester	2008
LA	135*	Leicestershire Foxes v Somerset	Leicester	2013				
T20	84	Leicestershire Foxes v Lancashire Lightning	Manchester	2013				
