= Thomas Moore (English cricketer) =

English cricketer (born 1992)

Personal information
- Full name: Thomas Cambridge Moore
- Born: 29 March 1992 (age 34); Basildon, Essex, England
- Batting: Right-handed
- Bowling: Right-arm medium-fast
- Role: Bowler

Domestic team information
- Years: Team
- 2014–2016: Essex (squad no. 33)
- First-class debut: 25 May 2014 Essex v Surrey
- Last First-class: 4 August 2016 Essex v Sussex
- Only Twenty20: 30 May 2014 Essex v Hampshire

Career statistics
Competition	FC	T20
Matches	9	1
Runs scored	50	–
Batting average	10.00	–
100s/50s	0/0	–/–
Top score	17	–
Balls bowled	1,128	6
Wickets	18	0
Bowling average	35.66	–
5 wickets in innings	0	–
10 wickets in match	0	n/a
Best bowling	4/78	–
Catches/stumpings	6/–	0/–
- Source: CricketArchive, 26 January 2017

Thomas Cambridge Rylan Moore (born 29 March 1992) is an English cricketer, who played for Essex County Cricket Club.
