= Matthew Spriegel =

English cricketer (born 1987)

Personal information
- Full name: Matthew Spriegel
- Born: 4 March 1987 (age 39); Epsom, Surrey, England
- Height: 6 ft 3 in (1.91 m)
- Batting: Left-handed
- Bowling: Right-arm off break
- Role: All-rounder

Domestic team information
- Years: Team
- 2007–2008: Loughborough UCCE
- 2008–2012: Surrey
- 2013–2014: Northamptonshire

Career statistics
Competition	FC	LA	T20
Matches	56	79	71
Runs scored	1,965	1,617	516
Batting average	22.58	32.34	15.17
100s/50s	3/6	0/10	0/1
Top score	108*	86	53*
Balls bowled	2449	2207	879
Wickets	35	51	35
Bowling average	42.42	37.07	32.34
5 wickets in innings	0	0	0
10 wickets in match	0	0	0
Best bowling	3/26	3/29	4/33
Catches/stumpings	32/–	40/-	25/-
- Source: ESPNcricinfo, 21 January 2016

Matthew Neil William Spriegel (born 4 March 1987) is an English former cricketer who played as a left-handed batsman and right-arm off break bowler for Loughborough UCCE, Surrey and Northamptonshire.

== Early life and education ==
Spriegel was born on 4 March 1987 in Epsom, Surrey. He was educated at Whitgift School before attending Loughborough University.

== Domestic career ==
Spriegel made his first-class debut for Loughborough UCCE against Somerset on 14 April 2007. He played six first-class matches for them, three in 2007 and three in 2008, all of them as captain.

He first played for Surrey in a 50-over Friends Provident Trophy fixture against Essex at Chelmsford on 25 May 2008. He made his Surrey first-class debut in a County Championship game against Somerset at Whitgift School on 30 May 2008. He made his maiden first-class hundred in the final match of the 2009 season against Glamorgan at The Oval.

On 7 September 2012, it was confirmed that Northamptonshire had signed Spriegel on a two-year contract. Following his release by Northamptonshire at the end of his contract, Spriegel announced his retirement on 13 November 2014.
