= Nathan Buck =

English cricketer

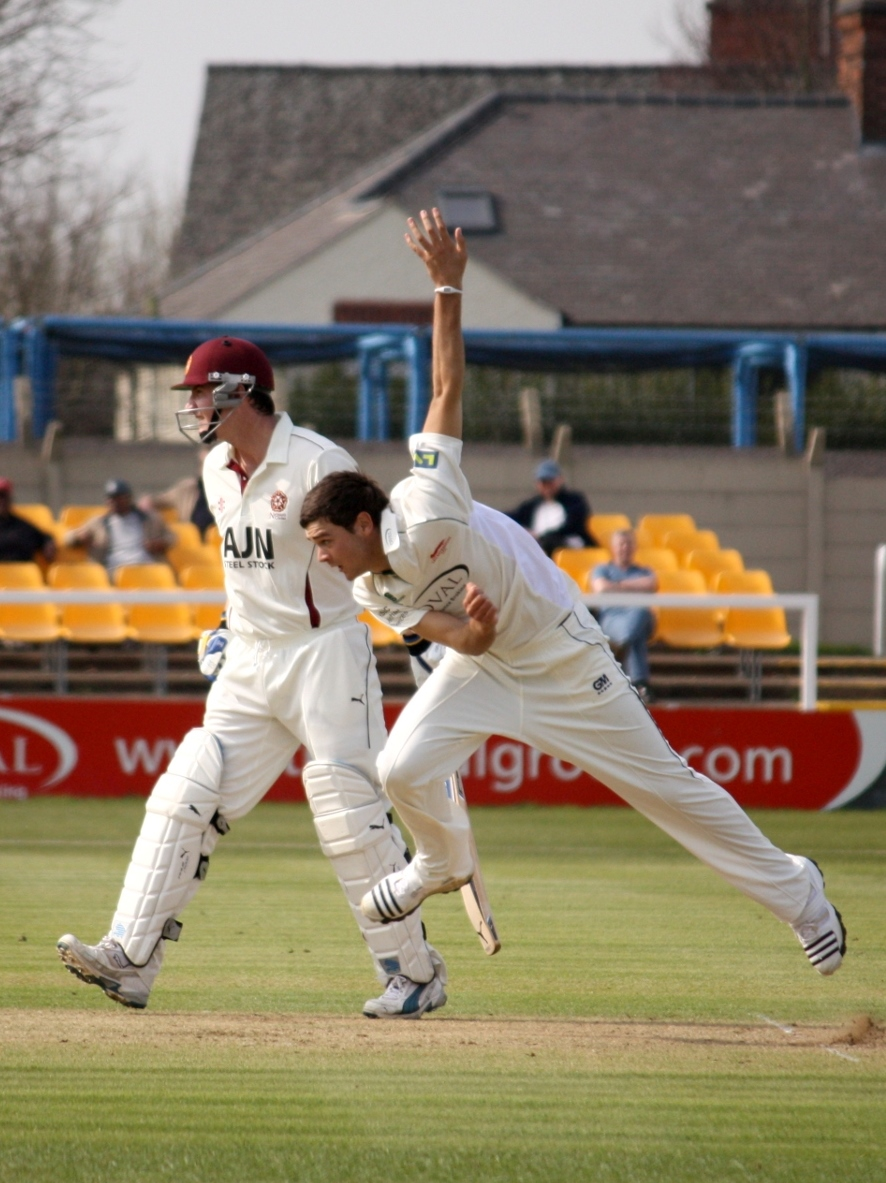

Personal information
- Full name: Nathan Liam Buck
- Born: 26 April 1991 (age 35); Leicester, Leicestershire, England
- Batting: Right-handed
- Bowling: Right-arm medium-fast
- Role: Bowler

Domestic team information
- Years: Team
- 2009–2014: Leicestershire
- 2014–2016: Lancashire
- 2017–2022: Northamptonshire
- First-class debut: 11 April 2010; Leics v Loughborough MCCU
- List A debut: 23 August 2009 Leics v Lancashire

Career statistics
Competition	FC	LA	T20
Matches	101	68	69
Runs scored	1,489	168	133
Batting average	14.45	8.00	13.30
100s/50s	0/3	0/0	0/0
Top score	53	21	26*
Balls bowled	15,512	2,873	1,321
Wickets	272	83	73
Bowling average	34.14	36.07	26.41
5 wickets in innings	8	0	0
10 wickets in match	0	0	0
Best bowling	6/34	4/39	4/26
Catches/stumpings	18/–	13/–	14/–
- Source: ESPNcricinfo, 5 October 2022

Nathan Liam Buck (born 26 April 1991) is an English cricketer. He is a right-handed batsman and right-arm medium-fast bowler who plays for Northamptonshire. He was born in Leicester, and started playing for Grace Dieu Park Cricket Club in Thringstone.

Buck made his cricketing debut in the Under-13 County Cup for Leicestershire and Rutland in 2004, and played for a single season in the Under-17 County Championship in 2007.

In January 2009, Buck made five Under-19 One Day International appearances for England in a tour of South Africa. Buck made his first-class debut for Leicestershire against Loughborough UCCE in April 2009 taking a wicket. He later signed a three-year contract with Leicestershire taking him into June 2012.

After taking 49 County Championship wickets in his first full season, Buck was called up to the England Lions cricket team in January 2011 for their tour of the Caribbean. He was also selected for the ECB Fast Bowling programme in India coached by former Australian legend Dennis Lillee. After the 2011 season in which he took 25 County Championship wickets, Buck was selected for the winter England Performance Programme.

In April 2012, Buck signed a two-year contract. Unfortunately, most of the 2012 season was marred by injury.

Buck was one of several high-profile players to leave Leicestershire after a dismal season in 2014 when he joined Lancashire.

In September 2016, Buck joined Northamptonshire on a three-year contract ahead of the 2017 season.
