= David Wainwright (Yorkshire cricketer) =

English cricketer

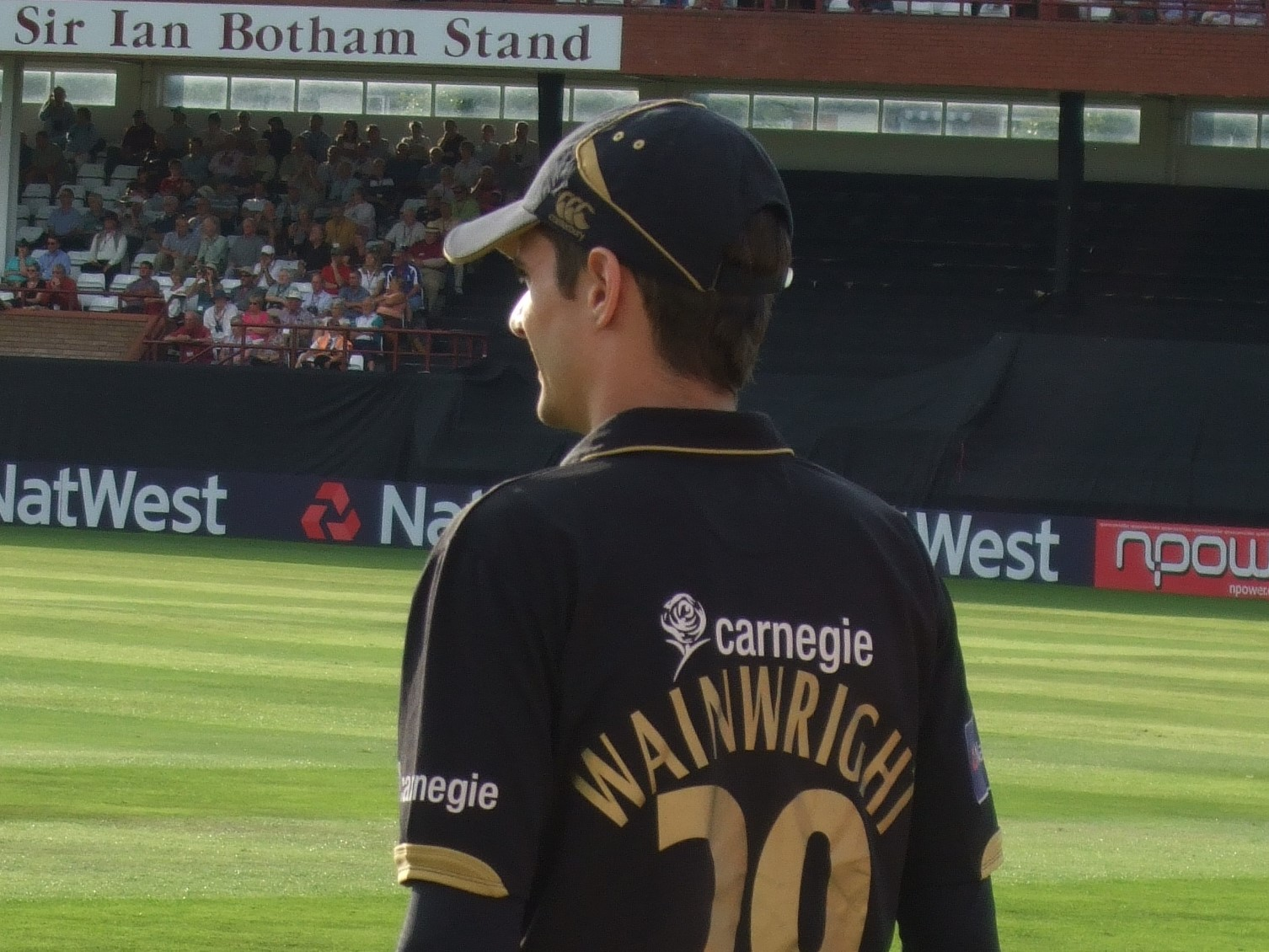

Personal information
- Full name: David John Wainwright
- Born: 21 March 1985 (age 41); Pontefract, England
- Height: 5 ft 9 in (1.75 m)
- Batting: Left-handed
- Bowling: Slow left-arm orthodox
- Role: Bowler

Domestic team information
- Years: Team
- 2004–2011: Yorkshire
- 2012–2015: Derbyshire
- 2016: Hampshire
- 2016–2017: Shropshire
- 2019–: Cheshire
- First-class debut: 10 September 2004 Yorkshire v Somerset
- Last First-class: 22 April 2012 Derbyshire v Leicestershire
- List A debut: 31 July 2005 Yorkshire v Kent
- Last List A: 22 May 2011 Yorkshire v Worcestershire

Career statistics
Competition	FC	LA	T20
Matches	81	77	47
Runs scored	2,270	354	112
Batting average	26.39	19.66	16.00
100s/50s	3/9	0/0	0/0
Top score	109	41	20*
Balls bowled	13,216	2,840	871
Wickets	181	66	37
Bowling average	38.62	35.25	28.62
5 wickets in innings	6	0	0
10 wickets in match	0	0	0
Best bowling	6/33	4/11	3/6
Catches/stumpings	28/–	23/–	11/–
- Source: , 28 September 2016

David John Wainwright (born 21 March 1985) is an English first-class cricketer, who played for Yorkshire from 2004 to 2011 and Derbyshire from 2012 to 2015. He is a left arm orthodox spin bowler, who has also played for British Universities and Loughborough UCCE.

== Life and career ==
He was educated at Hemsworth High School and Loughborough University, and is now a full-time cricketer. He started playing cricket at Castleford Cricket Club.

He appeared for England as a substitute fielder, during the second Test match against the West Indies, at Headingley in 2007.

In July 2009, Wainwright joined then fellow Yorkshire cricketer, Matthew Hoggard, by signing up with a new sponsor, Woodworm.

In February 2010, Wainwright played for England Lions versus Pakistan A in Dubai. He took three wickets for 26 in the match.

In September 2011, Yorkshire County Cricket Club announced that Wainwright had exercised the clause in his contract where he can request to be released, if he is not playing regular first team cricket. In 2012, Wainwright moved to Derbyshire and took a first-class, career-best return of 6 for 33, on his debut for them against Northamptonshire. He was released from his Derbyshire contract in August 2015.
