= Scott Elstone =

English cricketer (born 1990)

Personal information
- Full name: Scott Liam Elstone
- Born: 10 June 1990 (age 36); Burton-on-Trent, Staffordshire, England
- Nickname: Owl
- Batting: Right-handed
- Bowling: Right-arm off break
- Role: Batting all-rounder

Domestic team information
- Years: Team
- 2010–2012: Nottinghamshire (squad no. 17)
- 2013: Unicorns
- 2013–2016: Derbyshire (squad no. 7)

Career statistics
Competition	FC	LA	T20
Matches	14	38	38
Runs scored	452	671	338
Batting average	21.52	22.36	15.36
100s/50s	1/1	0/2	0/0
Top score	103*	75*	37
Balls bowled	517	58	36
Wickets	10	1	0
Bowling average	34.60	58.00	—
5 wickets in innings	0	0	—
10 wickets in match	0	0	–
Best bowling	3/68	1/22	—
Catches/stumpings	5/–	16/–	14/–
- Source: Cricinfo, 27 July 2016

Scott Liam Elstone (born 10 June 1990) is an English cricketer. He is a right-handed batsman and bowls right arm off break. He has played for Nottinghamshire, the Unicorns and Derbyshire.

== Career ==
Elstone made his debut for the Nottinghamshire 1st XI in the Clydesdale Bank 40 game against Scotland. He was Nottinghamshire 2nd XI captain from 2010 until 2012, when it was announced on 12 September that his contract would not be renewed for 2013.

During the Indian cricket team in England in 2011 tour, Elstone was used as a substitute fielder while first Graeme Swann and later Jonathan Trott were injured and unable to field during the second Power Test Match at Trent Bridge. On 1 August 2011, he took catches off the bowling of Tim Bresnan to dismiss Suresh Raina and Harbhajan Singh. In doing so, Elstone became the second youngest substitute fielder to take a catch during a match involving England played in England after Hampshire player Adam Rouse (aged 19) took a catch to remove Kumar Sangakkara off the bowling of Jimmy Anderson in the preceding England v Sri Lanka Test series at The Rose Bowl. He was also used as twelfth man in the second Test Match against the West Indies at Trent Bridge in May 2012, bringing the drinks onto the field several times as well as being substitute fielder occasionally. Though this time he took no catches.

On 5 May 2013, Elstone made his debut for the Unicorns in the Yorkshire Bank 40 and top scored with 75* in a losing cause. His highest score to date. On 12 May 2014, four years after making his List A debut, Elstone finally made his first-class debut for Derbyshire against Kent, batting at number five before making his first half century in the very next match against Gloucestershire. Elstone's Derbyshire contract was cancelled by mutual consent in July 2016.

He went to school at The Friary School in Lichfield.
