= Angus Robson =

Australian cricketer (born 1992)

Personal information
- Full name: Angus James Robson
- Born: 19 February 1992 (age 34); Darlinghurst, Sydney, New South Wales, Australia
- Batting: Right-handed
- Bowling: Right-arm leg break
- Role: Batsman
- Relatives: Sam Robson (brother)

Domestic team information
- Years: Team
- 2013–2017: Leicestershire (squad no. 8)
- 2017: Sussex (squad no. 20)
- 2019: Durham
- FC debut: 3 September 2013 Leicestershire v Gloucestershire
- LA debut: 27 June 2014 Leicestershire v Derbyshire

Career statistics
Competition	FC	LA
Matches	58	15
Runs scored	3,180	333
Batting average	30.87	22.20
100s/50s	2/28	0/2
Top score	120	90
Balls bowled	153	–
Wickets	0	–
Bowling average	–	–
5 wickets in innings	–	–
10 wickets in match	–	n/a
Best bowling	–	–
Catches/stumpings	46/–	3/–
- Source: CricketArchive, 22 August 2019

Angus James Robson (born 19 February 1992 in Sydney) is an Australian cricketer who played in England for Leicestershire, Sussex and Durham. He is the brother of England and Middlesex opening batsman, Sam. He plays as a right-handed batsman who bowls leg breaks. He was part of the Leicestershire side that completed a famous first victory in 3 years against Essex on 3 June 2015, playing a big role in the side as an opening batsman, scoring 120 and 71 in the game.

After falling out of favour at Leicestershire, Robson left the club in April 2017, and soon found a new home at Sussex. However, after making no appearances in 2018, he signed for Kidderminster CC in the Birmingham and District League. In 2019 he played in four first-class matches for Durham, but was not retained on the staff at the end of the season.
