= Matt Dunn (cricketer) =

English cricketer (born 1992)

Personal information
- Full name: Matthew Peter Dunn
- Born: 5 May 1992 (age 34); Egham, Surrey, England
- Height: 6 ft 1 in (1.85 m)
- Batting: Left-handed
- Bowling: Right-arm fast-medium
- Role: Bowler

Domestic team information
- Years: Team
- 2010–2025: Surrey (squad no. 4)
- FC debut: 9 May 2010 Surrey v Bangladeshis
- LA debut: 8 August 2011 England Development XI v Sri Lanka A

Career statistics
Competition	FC	LA	T20
Matches	43	23	25
Runs scored	197	80	10
Batting average	7.03	13.33	3.33
100s/50s	0/0	0/0	0/0
Top score	31*	34	6
Balls bowled	6,511	866	441
Wickets	117	23	31
Bowling average	36.21	40.34	21.90
5 wickets in innings	4	0	0
10 wickets in match	0	0	0
Best bowling	5/43	2/32	3/8
Catches/stumpings	10/–	6/–	6/–
- Source: CricketArchive, 21 August 2025

Matthew Peter Dunn (born 5 May 1992) is an English former professional cricketer. He was a left-handed batsman who bowled right-arm fast-medium.

== Career ==
Dunn represented England Under-19s, having made his debut for the team against Bangladesh Under-19s in a Youth One Day International in 2009. Following this he went on to play Youth Test and Youth Twenty20 Internationals. During the 2010 season, he made his first-class debut for Surrey against the touring Bangladeshis. He made three further first-class appearances for Surrey the following season, against Cambridge MCCU, and in the County Championship against Derbyshire and Gloucestershire. In his four first-class appearances to date, he has taken 9 wickets at an average of 26.77, with best figures of 5/56. His maiden five wicket haul came against Derbyshire, in his first County Championship match.

Dunn also made his List A debut in the 2011 season though not for Surrey. It instead came for an England Player Development XI against the touring Sri Lanka A team. He took the wickets of Bhanuka Rajapaksa and Sajeewa Weerakoon for the cost of 32 runs from 6 overs.

Dunn was Surrey's leading first-class wicket-taker in 2014 with 47. He received a call up to the England Lions four day squad in December 2014 for the tour of South Africa. After a decent 2015 two Championship games was all he managed across 2016 and 2017 as injuries hampered his progress. Dunn was part of the Surrey team that won the 2018 County Championship. Dunn showed signs of getting back to his very best when he ran through Somerset with 5 for 43 in a first class match at Guildford in 2019.

Dunn was part of the Surrey team that won the 2022 County Championship. On 30 August 2023 Dunn signed a new contract with Surrey.

On 21 August 2025, he announced his retirement from professional cricket on medical grounds because of on-going pain from a shoulder injury he sustained during a second XI match against Middlesex in May 2024.

== Personal life ==
Dunn is married to Jessica, and they had a daughter, Florence, who suffered from Dravet syndrome, from which she died in March 2023, aged two.
