= Patrick Grieshaber =

English cricketer (born 1996)

Personal information
- Full name: Patrick James Grieshaber
- Born: 24 November 1996 (age 29); Bath, Somerset, England
- Batting: Right-handed
- Role: Wicket-keeper

Domestic team information
- Years: Team
- 2014–2017: Gloucestershire
- Only First-class: 21 June 2014 Gloucestershire v Glamorgan
- Only List A: 24 July 2016 Gloucestershire v Sussex

Career statistics
Competition	FC	LA	T20
Matches	1	1	1
Runs scored	10	20	9
Batting average	10.00	20.00	9.00
100s/50s	0/0	0/0	0/0
Top score	10	20	9
Catches/stumpings	0/0	2/0	0/0
- Source: CricketArchive, 10 August 2016

Patrick James Grieshaber (born 24 November 1996) is an English cricketer who most recently played for Gloucestershire and made his first-class debut as a righthanded batsman and wicketkeeper in 2014. On 24 July 2016 he made his List A debut against Sussex in the 2016 Royal London One-Day Cup.

Grieshaber was released by Gloucestershire at the end of the 2017 season.
