= 2015 County Championship =

English cricket tournament

- Tournament logo
- Dates: 12 April – 25 September 2015
- Administrator: England and Wales Cricket Board
- Cricket format: First-class cricket (4 days)
- Tournament format: League system
- Champions: Yorkshire (32nd title)
- Participants: 18
- Most runs: James Hildreth (1,390) (Div 1)
- Most wickets: Chris Rushworth (83) (Div 1)

The 2015 County Championship season, known as the LV= County Championship for sponsorship reasons, was the 116th cricket County Championship season. It was contested through two divisions: Division One and Division Two. Each team played all the others in their division both home and away.

== Teams ==
Home grounds of each County.

=== Division One ===
Team promoted from Division Two

Team	Primary home ground	Other grounds	Coach	Captain	Overseas player(s)
Durham	Riverside Ground, Chester-le-Street	—	(England) Jon Lewis	(England) Paul Collingwood	(Australia) John Hastings
Hampshire	The Rose Bowl, Southampton	—	(South Africa) Dale Benkenstein	(England) Jimmy Adams (Apr-Jul) (England) James Vince (Jul-Sep)	(Australia) Jackson Bird (Apr-Aug) (South Africa) Ryan McLaren (Aug-Sep)
Middlesex	Lord's, London	Merchant Taylors' School Ground, Northwood; Uxbridge Cricket Club Ground, Uxbridge	(England) Richard Scott	(Australia) Adam Voges (Apr–May) (New Zealand) James Franklin (May–Sep)	(Australia) Adam Voges (Apr–May) (Australia) Joe Burns (May–Jul)
Nottinghamshire	Trent Bridge, Nottingham	—	(England) Mick Newell	(England) Chris Read	(South Africa) Vernon Philander (Apr–May) (Australia) Ben Hilfenhaus (Jun–Sep)
Somerset	County Ground, Taunton	—	(England) Matthew Maynard	(England) Marcus Trescothick	(Pakistan) Abdur Rehman
Sussex	County Ground, Hove	Arundel Castle Cricket Club Ground, Arundel; Cricket Field Road Ground, Horsham	(England) Mark Robinson	(Ireland) Ed Joyce	(Australia) Steve Magoffin
Warwickshire	Edgbaston, Birmingham	—	(Scotland) Dougie Brown	(England) Varun Chopra	(New Zealand) Jeetan Patel
Worcestershire	County Ground, New Road, Worcester	—	(England) Steve Rhodes	(England) Daryl Mitchell	(Sri Lanka) Sachithra Senanayake (Apr–May) (New Zealand) Colin Munro (May–Jun) (Pakistan) Saeed Ajmal
Yorkshire	Headingley, Leeds	North Marine Road Ground, Scarborough	(Australia) Jason Gillespie	(England) Andrew Gale	(India) Cheteshwar Pujara (Apr–May) (Australia) Glenn Maxwell (May–Jun) (Australia) Aaron Finch (Jun–Sep)

=== Division Two ===
Team relegated from Division One

Team	Primary home ground	Other grounds	Coach	Captain	Overseas player(s)
Derbyshire	County Ground, Derby	Queen's Park, Chesterfield	(England) Graeme Welch	(South Africa) Wayne Madsen	(New Zealand) Martin Guptill (Apr) (South Africa) Hashim Amla (May) (Sri Lanka) Tillakaratne Dilshan (May–Sep)
Essex	County Ground, Chelmsford	Castle Park Cricket Ground, Colchester	(England) Paul Grayson	(England) James Foster	(New Zealand) Jesse Ryder
Glamorgan	SWALEC Stadium, Cardiff	Penrhyn Avenue, Rhos-on-Sea; St Helen's, Swansea	(Wales) Toby Radford	(South Africa) Jacques Rudolph	(South Africa) Jacques Rudolph
Gloucestershire	County Ground, Bristol	College Ground, Cheltenham	(England) Richard Dawson	(Papua New Guinea) Geraint Jones	(Australia) Peter Handscomb (Apr–May) (Australia) Michael Klinger (May–Sep)
Kent	St Lawrence Ground, Canterbury	Kent County Cricket Ground, Beckenham; Nevill Ground, Tunbridge Wells	(Cricket West Indies) Jimmy Adams	(England) Rob Key	—
Lancashire	Old Trafford, Manchester	Trafalgar Road Ground, Southport	(England) Ashley Giles	(England) Glen Chapple	(Australia) Peter Siddle (Apr–May) (Australia) James Faulkner (May–Jun)
Leicestershire	Grace Road, Leicester	—	(Australia) Andrew McDonald	(Australia) Mark Cosgrove	(Australia) Clint McKay
Northamptonshire	County Ground, Northampton	—	(England) David Ripley	(England) Alex Wakely	(South Africa) Rory Kleinveldt
Surrey	The Oval, London	Woodbridge Road, Guildford	(South Africa) Graham Ford	(England) Gareth Batty	(Sri Lanka) Kumar Sangakkara

== Standings ==
Teams receive 16 points for a win, 8 for a tie and 5 for a draw. Bonus points (a maximum of 5 batting points and 3 bowling points) may be scored during the first 110 overs of each team's first innings.

=== Division One ===
- Yorkshire were Champions of Division One with a record points total (in a 16-game championship) and record wins. Sussex and Worcestershire were relegated to County Championship Division Two.
- Middlesex were deducted 1 point for slow over rate.

Team	Pld	W	L	T	D	A	Bat	Bowl	Ded	Pts
Yorkshire (C)	16	11	1	0	4	0	45	45	0	286
Middlesex	16	7	2	0	7	0	29	43	1	218
Nottinghamshire	16	6	5	0	5	0	45	45	0	211
Durham	16	7	8	0	1	0	26	45	0	188
Warwickshire	16	5	5	0	6	0	31	45	0	186
Somerset	16	4	6	0	6	0	46	43	0	183
Hampshire	16	4	6	0	6	0	31	38	0	163
Sussex (R)	16	4	8	0	4	0	36	41	0	161
Worcestershire (R)	16	3	10	0	3	0	44	44	0	151

=== Division Two ===
- Surrey were County Championship Division Two Champions and are promoted to County Championship Division One alongside Lancashire, who finished in 2nd place.
- Derbyshire deducted 1 point for slow over rate, Northamptonshire deducted 2 points for slow over rate, Leicestershire deducted 16 points by ECB Disciplinary panel.

Team	Pld	W	L	T	D	A	Bat	Bowl	Ded	Pts
Surrey (P)	16	8	1	0	7	0	56	45	0	264
Lancashire (P)	16	7	1	0	8	0	58	44	0	254
Essex	16	6	5	0	5	0	37	42	0	200
Glamorgan	16	4	4	0	8	0	42	37	0	183
Northamptonshire	16	3	3	0	10	0	38	46	2	180
Gloucestershire	16	5	5	0	6	0	31	36	0	177
Kent	16	4	7	0	5	0	28	44	0	161
Derbyshire	16	3	7	0	6	0	34	42	1	153
Leicestershire	16	2	9	0	5	0	36	41	16	118

== Results summary ==
The first fixtures began on 12 April 2015. The final set of fixtures commenced on 22 September 2015.

=== Division One ===
	Durham	Hampshire	Middlesex	Nottinghamshire	Somerset	Sussex	Warwickshire	Worcestershire	Yorkshire
Durham		Hampshire; 7 wickets	Middlesex; 71 runs	Durham; 6 wickets	Durham; 120 runs	Durham; 6 wickets	Warwickshire; 2 wickets	Durham; 3 wickets	Yorkshire inns & 47 runs
Hampshire	Match drawn		Match drawn	Match drawn	Somerset; 9 wickets	Sussex; 92 runs	Hampshire; 216 runs	Match drawn	Yorkshire; 5 wickets
Middlesex	Middlesex; 187 runs	Middlesex; 9 wickets		Match drawn	Match drawn	Middlesex; 20 runs	Match drawn	Match drawn	Middlesex; 246 runs
Nottinghamshire	Nottinghamshire; 52 runs	Hampshire; 8 wickets	Match drawn		Somerset; 133 runs	Nottinghamshire; 159 runs	Nottinghamshire inns & 123 runs	Nottinghamshire; 113 runs	Match drawn
Somerset	Durham; 7 wickets	Match drawn	Middlesex; 5 wickets	Somerset; 2 wickets		Match drawn	Somerset; 17 runs	Match drawn	Match drawn
Sussex	Durham; 178 runs	Hampshire; 6 wickets	Middlesex; 79 runs	Nottinghamshire inns & 103 runs	Match drawn		Sussex; 1 wicket	Sussex; 61 runs	Match drawn
Warwickshire	Warwickshire; 8 wickets	Match drawn	Match drawn	Match drawn	Warwickshire; 7 wickets	Match drawn		Warwickshire; 181 runs	Yorkshire; 174 runs
Worcestershire	Durham; 6 wickets	Worcestershire inns & 33 runs	Worcestershire inns & 128 runs	Nottinghamshire; 5 wickets	Worcestershire inns & 62 runs	Sussex inns & 63 runs	Warwickshire inns & 17 runs		Yorkshire; 10 wickets
Yorkshire	Yorkshire; 183 runs	Yorkshire; 305 runs	Yorkshire; 4 wickets	Yorkshire inns & 8 runs	Yorkshire inns & 126 runs	Yorkshire; 100 runs	Match drawn	Yorkshire; 7 wickets	

Home team won	Visiting team won	Match drawn

=== Division Two ===
	Derbyshire	Essex	Glamorgan	Gloucestershire	Kent	Lancashire	Leicestershire	Northamptonshire	Surrey
Derbyshire		Essex inns & 188 runs	Match drawn	Match drawn	Match drawn	Lancashire; 250 runs	Match drawn	Match drawn	Surrey; 222 runs
Essex	Essex inns & 31 runs		Essex; 248 runs	Gloucestershire; 9 wickets	Essex; 5 wickets	Match drawn	Leicestershire; 6 wickets	Match drawn	Surrey; 3 wickets
Glamorgan	Match drawn	Glamorgan; 89 runs		Gloucestershire; 7 wickets	Kent; 316 runs	Lancashire inns & 157 runs	Glamorgan; 137 runs	Glamorgan; 10 wickets	Match drawn
Gloucestershire	Derbyshire; 7 wickets	Essex; 5 wickets	Match drawn		Kent; 8 wickets	Lancashire; 91 runs	Gloucestershire; 155 runs	Gloucestershire; 9 wickets	Match drawn
Kent	Derbyshire; 8 wickets	Kent inns & 207 runs	Match drawn	Match drawn		Match drawn	Match drawn	Northamptonshire inns & 23 runs	Surrey; 3 wickets
Lancashire	Lancashire inns & 15 runs	Match drawn	Match drawn	Gloucestershire; 91 runs	Lancashire; 9 wickets		Lancashire inns & 157 runs	Match drawn	Match drawn
Leicestershire	Leicestershire; 3 wickets	Essex; 5 wickets	Match drawn	Match drawn	Kent; 8 wickets	Lancashire; 244 runs		Northamptonshire; 92 runs	Surrey; 178 runs
Northamptonshire	Derbyshire; 7 wickets	Match drawn	Match drawn	Match drawn	Northamptonshire; 8 wickets	Match drawn	Match drawn		Match drawn
Surrey	Surrey inns & 98 runs	Match drawn	Glamorgan; 7 wickets	Surrey inns & 180 runs	Surrey; 6 wickets	Match drawn	Surrey; 7 wickets	Match drawn	

Home team won	Visiting team won	Match drawn

== Results in full ==
=== Division One ===
==== April ====
12–15 April	Sussex	v	(H) Hampshire	Sussex won by 92 runs
Scorecard	444 (142.4 overs); BC Brown 144* (242); DR Briggs 4/74 (32.4 overs)		231 (50 overs); SM Ervine 66* (89); A Shahzad 3/54 (12 overs)	The Rose Bowl, Southampton; Umpires: Russell Evans and Alex Wharf
Scorecard	164 (53 overs); LJ Wright 61 (87); JA Tomlinson 4/37 (12 overs)		285 (65.3 overs); MA Carberry 79 (86); A Shahzad 3/63 (16 overs)	The Rose Bowl, Southampton; Umpires: Russell Evans and Alex Wharf
Sussex won the toss and elected to bat; Points: Sussex 22, Hampshire 3

12–15 April	Nottinghamshire	v	(H) Middlesex	Match drawn
Scorecard	298 (93.2 overs); BRM Taylor 106 (188); JAR Harris 4/75 (23 overs)		181 (66 overs); JA Simpson 35 (80); SR Patel 3/30 (6 overs)	Lord's, London; Umpires: Nick Cook and Michael Gough
Scorecard	401/8d (96 overs); CMW Read 101* (77); TJ Murtagh 3/69 (24 overs)		300/7 (118.5 overs); NRD Compton 85 (217); HF Gurney 3/69 (24 overs)	Lord's, London; Umpires: Nick Cook and Michael Gough
Nottinghamshire won the toss and elected to bat; Points: Nottinghamshire 10, Middlesex 8

12–14 April	(H) Somerset	v	Durham	Durham won by 7 wickets
Scorecard	299 (75 overs); JG Myburgh 118 (160); PD Collingwood 5/57 (12 overs)		380 (92.5 overs); PD Collingwood 109* (145); L Gregory 5/99 (21 overs)	County Ground, Taunton; Umpires: Mark Benson and Nigel Cowley
Scorecard	230 (59.4 overs); PD Trego 79 (83); C Rushworth 6/92 (22 overs)		150/3 (32.3 overs); SG Borthwick 51* (60); J Overton 1/27 (6 overs)	County Ground, Taunton; Umpires: Mark Benson and Nigel Cowley
Somerset won the toss and elected to bat; Points: Durham 23, Somerset 5

12–14 April	(H) Worcestershire	v	Yorkshire	Yorkshire won by 10 wickets
Scorecard	311 (93.3 overs); TC Fell 114 (196); JA Brooks 5/56 (21.3 overs)		307 (85.1 overs); AZ Lees 87 (135); GM Andrew 5/85 (21.1 overs)	County Ground, New Road, Worcester; Umpires: Jeff Evans and Jeremy Lloyds
Scorecard	100 (35.3 overs); T Kohler-Cadmore 24 (59); SA Patterson 5/11 (7.3 overs)		105/0 (17 overs); AZ Lees 52* (51)	County Ground, New Road, Worcester; Umpires: Jeff Evans and Jeremy Lloyds
Worcestershire won the toss and elected to bat; Points: Yorkshire 22, Worcestershire 6

19–22 April	(H) Nottinghamshire	v	Yorkshire	Match drawn
Scorecard	428 (108.2 overs); AD Hales 236 (282); SA Patterson 3/78 (29 overs)		441 (147.5 overs); JA Leaning 116 (198); SR Patel 4/102 (32.5 overs)	Trent Bridge, Nottingham; Umpires: Rob Bailey and Russell Evans
Scorecard	354/7d (105 overs); CMW Read 83* (107); WMH Rhodes 2/42 (15 overs)			Trent Bridge, Nottingham; Umpires: Rob Bailey and Russell Evans
Yorkshire won the toss and elected to field; First-class debut: Matthew Fisher (Yorkshire); Points: Nottinghamshire 11, Yorkshire 11

19–22 April	(H) Sussex	v	Worcestershire	Sussex won by 61 runs
Scorecard	345 (79 overs); MW Machan 135 (100); GM Andrew 3/73 (17 overs)		389 (105.1 overs); RK Oliver 101 (212); SJ Magoffin 3/69 (26 overs)	County Ground, Hove; Umpires: Neil Bainton and Steve O'Shaughnessy
Scorecard	290 (87 overs); EC Joyce 82 (149); SMSM Senanayake 4/50 (27 overs)		185 (59.3 overs); OB Cox 48* (74); A Shahzad 5/46 (16 overs)	County Ground, Hove; Umpires: Neil Bainton and Steve O'Shaughnessy
Sussex won the toss and elected to bat; Points: Sussex 22, Worcestershire 7

19–22 April	Hampshire	v	(H) Warwickshire	Match drawn
Scorecard	319 (89.3 overs); AJA Wheater 74 (91); WB Rankin 6/75 (16.3 overs)		280 (85.3 overs); TR Ambrose 113 (159); JA Tomlinson 3/53 (17 overs)	Edgbaston, Birmingham; Umpires: Graham Lloyd and Tim Robinson
Scorecard	339 (94.2 overs); SM Ervine 102 (144); R Clarke 3/63 (16 overs)		244/5 (105.4 overs); V Chopra 119* (309); JA Tomlinson 2/56 (21 overs)	Edgbaston, Birmingham; Umpires: Graham Lloyd and Tim Robinson
Warwickshire won the toss and elected to field; Points: Hampshire 11, Warwickshire 10

26–29 April	Sussex	v	(H) Durham	Durham won by 6 wickets
Scorecard	335 (72.2 overs); OE Robinson 110 (112); U Arshad 3/41 (10.2 overs)		339 (82.2 overs); JW Hastings 72 (86); OE Robinson 4/71 (17 overs)	Riverside Ground, Chester-le-Street; Umpires: Peter Hartley and Graham Lloyd
Scorecard	265 (69.4 overs); MW Machan 80 (122); C Rushworth 5/81 (23 overs)		263/4 (69.2 overs); SG Borthwick 97* (143); A Shahzad 4/86 (22 overs)	Riverside Ground, Chester-le-Street; Umpires: Peter Hartley and Graham Lloyd
Durham won the toss and elected to field; First-class debut: Ollie Robinson (Sussex); Points: Durham 22, Sussex 6

26–29 April	Nottinghamshire	v	(H) Hampshire	Match drawn
Scorecard	371 (120.4 overs); AD Hales 141 (221); GK Berg 3/88 (27 overs)		276 (95.1 overs); JHK Adams 61 (149); L Wood 3/68 (22 overs)	The Rose Bowl, Southampton; Umpires: Nigel Cowley and Steve O'Shaughnessy
Scorecard	296/4d (59 overs); BRM Taylor 103 (120); LA Dawson 2/67 (12 overs)		29/0 (9.4 overs); LA Dawson 19* (37)	The Rose Bowl, Southampton; Umpires: Nigel Cowley and Steve O'Shaughnessy
Hampshire won the toss and elected to field; Points: Nottinghamshire 6, Hampshire 5

26–29 April	(H) Somerset	v	Middlesex	Middlesex won by 5 wickets
Scorecard	408 (89.2 overs); JC Hildreth 187 (212); JAR Harris 5/83 (18 overs)		317 (87 overs); AC Voges 98 (135); L Gregory 6/101 (23 overs)	County Ground, Taunton; Umpires: Richard Kettleborough and Alex Wharf
Scorecard	310 (80.3 overs); JC Hildreth 86 (153); JAR Harris 3/64 (18 overs)		405/5 (101.5 overs); AC Voges 132 (210); L Gregory 2/100 (27 overs)	County Ground, Taunton; Umpires: Richard Kettleborough and Alex Wharf
Middlesex won the toss and elected to field; Points: Middlesex 22, Somerset 8

26–29 April	Warwickshire	v	(H) Yorkshire	Match drawn
Scorecard	435 (143.3 overs); IJ Westwood 196 (377); TT Bresnan 5/85 (30 overs)		303 (98.3 overs); AW Gale 96 (182); WB Rankin 6/55 (15.3 overs)	Headingley, Leeds; Umpires: Steve Garratt and Jeremy Lloyds
Scorecard	219/7d (54.3 overs); IJ Westwood 84 (134); JD Middlebrook 5/82 (16.3 overs)		221/4 (64 overs); AJ Hodd 54* (93); JS Patel 3/70 (28 overs)	Headingley, Leeds; Umpires: Steve Garratt and Jeremy Lloyds
Warwickshire won the toss and elected to bat; Points: Warwickshire 11, Yorkshire 9

==== May ====
2–5 May	(H) Middlesex	v	Durham	Middlesex won by 187 runs
Scorecard	463 (137 overs); SD Robson 178 (300); JW Hastings 4/87 (33 overs)		294 (92.5 overs); KK Jennings 98 (214); James Harris 4/69 (22.3 overs)	Lord's, London; Umpires: Neil Bainton and Peter Hartley
Scorecard	89 (24.2 overs); TJ Murtagh 22* (14); JW Hastings 5/24 (8.2 overs)		71 (24.1 overs); SG Borthwick 14 (26); James Harris 9/34 (12.1 overs)	Lord's, London; Umpires: Neil Bainton and Peter Hartley
Durham won the toss and elected to field; Points: Middlesex 23, Durham 4

3–5 May	Somerset	v	(H) Worcestershire	Worcestershire won by an innings and 62 runs
Scorecard	250 (75.1 overs); C Overton 41 (56); CAJ Morris 5/71 (24 overs)		402 (111.5 overs); OB Cox 109 (162); AC Thomas 4/81 (23 overs)	County Ground, New Road, Worcester; Umpires: Russell Evans and Michael Gough
Scorecard	90 (32 overs); JC Hildreth 35 (73); JD Shantry 4/15 (8 overs)			County Ground, New Road, Worcester; Umpires: Russell Evans and Michael Gough
Worcestershire won the toss and elected to field; Points: Worcestershire 23, Somerset 5

9–12 May	(H) Warwickshire	v	Worcestershire	Warwickshire won by 181 runs
Scorecard	264 (101.3 overs); SR Hain 82 (166); J Leach 6/73 (26.3 overs)		149 (42.5 overs); OB Cox 45 (72); KHD Barker 3/43 (15 overs)	Edgbaston, Birmingham; Umpires: David Millns and Martin Saggers
Scorecard	321/8d (109 overs); V Chopra 107 (229); J Leach 2/61 (24 overs)		255 (83 overs); OB Cox 44 (47); JS Patel 4/69 (22 overs)	Edgbaston, Birmingham; Umpires: David Millns and Martin Saggers
Worcestershire won the toss and elected to field; Points: Warwickshire 21, Worcestershire 3

10–12 May	Nottinghamshire	v	(H) Durham	Durham won by 6 wickets
Scorecard	245 (75.1 overs); MH Wessels 117 (168); C Rushworth 3/52 (18 overs)		163 (48.4 overs); MD Stoneman 44 (51); VD Philander 3/27 (13 overs)	Riverside Ground, Chester-le-Street; Umpires: Russell Evans and Neil Mallender
Scorecard	178 (54.1 overs); JWA Taylor 45 (70); MA Wood 4/39 (14 overs)		261/4 (63.3 overs); MA Wood 66 (114); L Wood 1/34 (13 overs)	Riverside Ground, Chester-le-Street; Umpires: Russell Evans and Neil Mallender
Durham won the toss and elected to field; Points: Durham 19, Nottinghamshire 4

10–12 May	Middlesex	v	(H) Sussex	Middlesex won by 79 runs
Scorecard	269 (77.5 overs); AC Voges 38 (49); OE Robinson 4/46 (20.5 overs)		192 (49.1 overs); BC Brown 46 (54); JAR Harris 3/79 (16 overs)	County Ground, Hove; Umpires: Steve Garratt and Jeremy Lloyds
Scorecard	209 (55.4 overs); JA Simpson 34 (63); SJ Magoffin 4/49 (20.4 overs)		207 (52.5 overs); MH Yardy 52 (124); NJ Dexter 4/41 (12 overs)	County Ground, Hove; Umpires: Steve Garratt and Jeremy Lloyds
Sussex won the toss and elected to field; Points: Middlesex 21, Sussex 3

10–13 May	(H) Yorkshire	v	Hampshire	Yorkshire won by 305 runs
Scorecard	370 (112.3 overs); JM Bairstow 102 (106); JA Tomlinson 4/86 (34 overs)		227 (80 overs); MA Carberry 97 (208); JA Brooks 4/57 (18 overs)	Headingley, Leeds; Umpires: Martin Bodenham and Richard Kettleborough
Scorecard	305/4d (69 overs); CA Pujara 133* (182); FH Edwards 2/96 (17 overs)		143 (74.3 overs); WR Smith 64* (207); AU Rashid 4/48 (26 overs)	Headingley, Leeds; Umpires: Martin Bodenham and Richard Kettleborough
Yorkshire won the toss and elected to bat; First-class debut: Lewis McManus (Hampshire); Points: Yorkshire 23, Hampshire 4

17–20 May	(H) Hampshire	v	Middlesex	Match drawn
Scorecard	413 (130.2 overs); WR Smith 93 (191); NJ Dexter 5/64 (27.2 overs)		362 (118.2 overs); NRD Compton 117 (237); FH Edwards 4/100 (22 overs)	The Rose Bowl, Southampton; Umpires: Rob Bailey and Ian Gould
Scorecard	185/5d (79 overs); MA Carberry 57 (130); SD Robson 1/8 (3 overs)			The Rose Bowl, Southampton; Umpires: Rob Bailey and Ian Gould
Middlesex won the toss and elected to field; First-class debut: Brad Wheal (Hampshire); Points: Hampshire 11, Middlesex 10

17–19 May	Somerset	v	(H) Nottinghamshire	Somerset won by 133 runs
Scorecard	312 (69.4 overs); J Allenby 64 (85); VD Philander 4/56 (19 overs)		226 (76.4 overs); SR Patel 56 (122); C Overton 4/40 (16.4 overs)	Trent Bridge, Nottingham; Umpires: Nick Cook and Tim Robinson
Scorecard	161 (44 overs); L Gregory 26* (65); VD Philander 3/47 (16 overs)		114 (35.2 overs); VD Philander 35* (48); TD Groenewald 4/41 (11.2 overs)	Trent Bridge, Nottingham; Umpires: Nick Cook and Tim Robinson
Nottinghamshire won the toss and elected to field; Points: Somerset 22, Nottinghamshire 4

17–20 May	(H) Warwickshire	v	Durham	Warwickshire won by 8 wickets
Scorecard	450 (107.4 overs); KHD Barker 102* (124); G Onions 5/85 (29 overs)		185 (40.5 overs); PD Collingwood 68 (77); RA Jones 4/48 (12 overs)	Edgbaston, Birmingham; Umpires: Nigel Cowley and Jeff Evans
Scorecard	63/2 (17.4 overs); IJ Westwood 32* (52); C Rushworth 1/16 (7 overs)		327 (92.2 overs) (f/o); MD Stoneman 111 (216); KHD Barker 5/103 (27.2 overs)	Edgbaston, Birmingham; Umpires: Nigel Cowley and Jeff Evans
Warwickshire won the toss and elected to bat; Points: Warwickshire 24, Durham 3

24–27 May	Yorkshire	v	(H) Somerset	Match drawn
Scorecard	438 (114.2 overs); JA Leaning 123 (239); PD Trego 4/73 (19 overs)		485 (102.4 overs); TLW Cooper 99 (157); SA Patterson 5/70 (23 overs)	County Ground, Taunton; Umpires: Paul Baldwin and David Millns
Scorecard	419 (146.4 overs); AU Rashid 99 (198); JG Myburgh 3/57 (28 overs)		6/1 (2 overs); ME Trescothick 4 (9); GJ Maxwell 1/2 (1 over)	County Ground, Taunton; Umpires: Paul Baldwin and David Millns
Somerset won the toss and elected to field; Points: Yorkshire 13, Somerset 12

24–26 May	Warwickshire	v	(H) Sussex	Sussex won by 1 wicket
Scorecard	180 (49 overs); IJL Trott 35 (52); OE Robinson 6/33 (13 overs)		191 (59.3 overs); LWP Wells 92 (181); JS Patel 4/24 (10 overs)	County Ground, Hove; Umpires: Russell Evans and Michael Gough
Scorecard	200 (53.4 overs); R Clarke 34 (75); ME Hobden 4/48 (11 overs)		190/9 (46.1 overs); CJ Jordan 56* (34); WB Rankin 3/32 (5.1 overs)	County Ground, Hove; Umpires: Russell Evans and Michael Gough
Warwickshire won the toss and elected to bat; Points: Sussex 19, Warwickshire 3

24–27 May	(H) Worcestershire	v	Durham	Durham won by 6 wickets
Scorecard	323 (81.3 overs); TC Fell 78 (157); P Coughlin 4/70 (16.3 overs)		198 (72.3 overs); SG Borthwick 103 (185); JD Shantry 4/39 (21.3 overs)	County Ground, New Road, Worcester; Umpires: Graham Lloyd and Martin Saggers
Scorecard	192 (42.3 overs); J Leach 76 (53); JW Hastings 7/60 (12.3 overs)		318/4 (82 overs); PD Collingwood 127 (183); CAJ Morris 2/99 (24 overs)	County Ground, New Road, Worcester; Umpires: Graham Lloyd and Martin Saggers
Durham won the toss and elected to field; Points: Durham 19, Worcestershire 6

31 May – 3 June	(H) Hampshire	v	Worcestershire	Match drawn
Scorecard	222 (79 overs); JHK Adams 48 (145); J Leach 5/63 (22 overs)		403/5d (96 overs); DKH Mitchell 142* (303); GK Berg 2/66 (22 overs)	The Rose Bowl, Southampton; Umpires: Mark Benson and Michael Gough
Scorecard	245/6 (90 overs); WR Smith 64* (150); J Leach 4/89 (28 overs)			The Rose Bowl, Southampton; Umpires: Mark Benson and Michael Gough
Worcestershire won the toss and elected to field; First-class debuts: Ed Barnard and Joe Clarke (both Worcestershire); Points: Worcestershire 13, Hampshire 7

31 May – 3 June	Warwickshire	v	(H) Middlesex	Match drawn
Scorecard	342 (105.1 overs); LJ Evans 98 (209); ST Finn 4/84 (28 overs)		260 (72.2 overs); NRD Compton 74 (140); R Clarke 3/42 (14 overs)	Lord's, London; Umpires: Martin Bodenham and Steve O'Shaughnessy
Scorecard	187 (64.2 overs); V Chopra 73 (150); TS Roland-Jones 4/51		152/5 (50 overs); JA Burns 72 (140); R Clarke 2/32 (11 overs)	Lord's, London; Umpires: Martin Bodenham and Steve O'Shaughnessy
Middlesex won the toss and elected to field; Points: Warwickshire 11, Middlesex 10

==== June ====
1–3 June	(H) Nottinghamshire	v	Sussex	Nottinghamshire won by 159 runs
Scorecard	255 (55.3 overs); L Wood 100 (96); SJ Magoffin 6/109 (22 overs)		189 (43 overs); C Cachopa 54 (83); JT Ball 6/49 (17 overs)	Trent Bridge, Nottingham; Umpires: Rob Bailey and Neil Bainton
Scorecard	243 (63.2 overs); SR Patel 100 (142); SJ Magoffin 6/50 (18.2 overs)		150 (32 overs); LJ Wright 39 (36); HF Gurney 5/43 (9 overs)	Trent Bridge, Nottingham; Umpires: Rob Bailey and Neil Bainton
Sussex won the toss and elected to field; Points: Nottinghamshire 21, Sussex 3

7–9 June	(H) Durham	v	Somerset	Durham won by 120 runs
Scorecard	189 (49.5 overs); KK Jennings 49 (101); C Overton 4/40 (11 overs)		225 (65.5 overs); JG Myburgh 61 (110); C Rushworth 4/54 (22 overs)	Riverside Ground, Chester-le-Street; Umpires: Stephen Gale and Steve O'Shaughnessy
Scorecard	314 (71.2 overs); JW Hastings 79 (68); C Overton 3/41 (14 overs)		158 (52 overs); PD Trego 35 (55); P Coughlin 4/10 (10 overs)	Riverside Ground, Chester-le-Street; Umpires: Stephen Gale and Steve O'Shaughnessy
Durham won the toss and elected to bat; Points: Durham 19, Somerset 4

7–9 June	(H) Sussex	v	Hampshire	Hampshire won by 6 wickets
Scorecard	251 (61.2 overs); LJ Wright 59 (77); GK Berg 4/67 (22 overs)		392 (85.3 overs); AJ Wheater 111 (99); OE Robinson 3/101 (23 overs)	County Ground, Hove; Umpires: Nigel Cowley and Steve Garratt
Scorecard	266 (79.5 overs); LJ Wright 84 (128); FH Edwards 5/58 (17 overs)		126/4 (29.5 overs); SP Terry 62* (94); ME Hobden 2/25 (7 overs)	County Ground, Hove; Umpires: Nigel Cowley and Steve Garratt
Sussex won the toss and elected to bat; First-class debut: Fynn Hudson-Prentice (Sussex); Points: Hampshire 23, Sussex 5

7–9 June	Middlesex	v	(H) Yorkshire	Yorkshire won by 4 wickets
Scorecard	212 (68.5 overs); NRD Compton 70 (153); JA Brooks 5/44 (18.5 overs)		229 (72.5 overs); JM Bairstow 125* (187); TS Roland-Jones 4/78 (23 overs)	Headingley, Leeds; Umpires: Jeff Evans and Martin Saggers
Scorecard	229 (79.5 overs); JEC Franklin 55* (126); WMH Rhodes 3/42 (9.5 overs)		215/6 (65.4 overs); A Lyth 67 (131); OP Rayner 2/52 (17 overs)	Headingley, Leeds; Umpires: Jeff Evans and Martin Saggers
Middlesex won the toss and elected to bat; Points: Yorkshire 20, Middlesex 4

14–17 June	Nottinghamshire	v	(H) Somerset	Somerset won by 2 wickets
Scorecard	410 (104.4 overs); BRM Taylor 152 (200); AC Thomas 5/73 (24 overs)		200 (53 overs); TB Abell 76* (150); M Carter 7/56 (16 overs)	County Ground, Taunton; Umpires: Mark Benson and Steve Garratt
Scorecard	190 (52.2 overs); SR Patel 46 (34); TD Groenewald 3/65 (13 overs)		402/8 (107.4 overs); PD Trego 79 (110); SR Patel 3/57 (20 overs)	County Ground, Taunton; Umpires: Mark Benson and Steve Garratt
Nottinghamshire won the toss and elected to bat; First-class debut: Matthew Carter (Nottinghamshire); Points: Somerset 20, Nottinghamshire 8

14–15 June	(H) Worcestershire	v	Warwickshire	Warwickshire won by an innings and 17 runs
Scorecard	243 (65.2 overs); JM Clarke 50 (61); KHD Barker 4/65 (16.2 overs)		340 (91.5 overs); IR Bell 111 (203); JD Shantry 5/92 (27 overs)	County Ground, New Road, Worcester; Umpires: Ben Debenham and Neil Mallender
Scorecard	80 (32.5 overs); TC Fell 23 (35); WB Rankin 3/23 (6 overs)			County Ground, New Road, Worcester; Umpires: Ben Debenham and Neil Mallender
Worcestershire won the toss and elected to bat; Points: Warwickshire 22, Worcestershire 4

15–18 June	Durham	v	(H) Sussex	Durham won by 178 runs
Scorecard	301 (77.1 overs); GJ Muchall 81* (156); TE Linley 5/63 (19 overs)		201 (58.5 overs); GH Dockrell 37* (43); C Rushworth 6/49 (21 overs)	Arundel Castle Cricket Club Ground, Arundel; Umpires: Jeremy Lloyds and Alex Wharf
Scorecard	413 (101.4 overs); GJ Muchall 115 (222); SJ Magoffin 5/89 (30 overs)		335 (116 overs); LWP Wells 108 (233); SG Borthwick 4/46 (19 overs)	Arundel Castle Cricket Club Ground, Arundel; Umpires: Jeremy Lloyds and Alex Wharf
Sussex won the toss and elected to field; Points: Durham 22, Sussex 4

21–23 June	Somerset	v	(H) Hampshire	Somerset won by 9 wickets
Scorecard	346 (105.1 overs); TB Abell 88 (177); GK Berg 4/64 (24.1 overs)		147 (43.2 overs); GK Berg 38 (60); C Overton 4/24 (9 overs)	The Rose Bowl, Southampton; Umpires: Neil Bainton and Martin Saggers
Scorecard	64/1 (17 overs); ME Trescothick 35 (53); DR Briggs 1/3 (2 overs)		262 (79.3 overs) (f/o); GK Berg 86 (104); C Overton 4/57 (18.3 overs)	The Rose Bowl, Southampton; Umpires: Neil Bainton and Martin Saggers
Somerset won the toss and elected to bat; Points: Somerset 22, Hampshire 3

21–24 June	(H) Middlesex	v	Worcestershire	Match drawn
Scorecard	309 (103 overs); JEC Franklin 135 (255); JD Shantry 4/66 (26 overs)		385 (116.5 overs); TC Fell 143 (228); TJ Murtagh 4/76 (30.5 overs)	Uxbridge Cricket Club Ground, Uxbridge; Umpires: Martin Bodenham and Alex Wharf
Scorecard	362/7d (118 overs); JEC Franklin 91* (164); JD Shantry 2/37 (17 overs)		39/1 (11 overs); MM Ali 21* (27); OP Rayner 1/7 (4 overs)	Uxbridge Cricket Club Ground, Uxbridge; Umpires: Martin Bodenham and Alex Wharf
Middlesex won the toss and elected to bat; Points: Worcestershire 12, Middlesex 10

22–24 June	Nottinghamshire	v	(H) Yorkshire	Yorkshire won by an innings and 8 runs
Scorecard	224 (59.5 overs); SCJ Broad 34 (36); JA Brooks 4/56 (14.5 overs)		430 (114.4 overs); AW Gale 148 (230); SCJ Broad 7/84 (26.4 overs)	Headingley, Leeds; Umpires: Graham Lloyd and David Millns
Scorecard	198 (42.3 overs); SCJ Broad 50 (42); RJ Sidebottom 4/39 (11 overs)			Headingley, Leeds; Umpires: Graham Lloyd and David Millns
Yorkshire won the toss and elected to field; Points: Yorkshire 24, Nottinghamshire 3

28 June – 1 July	Yorkshire	v	(H) Durham	Yorkshire won by an innings and 47 runs
Scorecard	557/6d (148 overs); JM Bairstow 219* (268); J Harrison 2/77 (23 overs)		208 (65.1 overs); RD Pringle 69* (131); TT Bresnan 3/40 (10 overs)	Riverside Ground, Chester-le-Street; Umpires: Paul Baldwin and Steve O'Shaughnessy
Scorecard			302 (90.4 overs) (f/o); MD Stoneman 113 (228); JA Brooks 4/66 (18.2 overs)	Riverside Ground, Chester-le-Street; Umpires: Paul Baldwin and Steve O'Shaughnessy
Durham won the toss and elected to field; Points: Yorkshire 23, Durham 3

28 June – 1 July	Hampshire	v	(H) Middlesex	Middlesex won by 9 wickets
Scorecard	176 (62.3 overs); JS Gatting 64* (86); JAR Harris 4/48 (15.3 overs)		330 (119 overs); NRD Compton 87 (156); BTJ Wheal 4/101 (27 overs)	Lord's, London; Umpires: Nick Cook and Peter Hartley
Scorecard	227 (97 overs); SP Terry 52 (171); JAR Harris 4/80 (23 overs)		77/1 (17.4 overs); SD Robson 36* (45); GD Berg 1/13 (5 overs)	Lord's, London; Umpires: Nick Cook and Peter Hartley
Middlesex won the toss and elected to field; Points: Middlesex 22, Hampshire 2

28 June – 1 July	Sussex	v	(H) Warwickshire	Match drawn
Scorecard	601/6d (163.4 overs); CD Nash 121 (203); JS Patel 2/106 (47 overs)		612/6d (192 overs); LJ Evans 213* (396); SJ Magoffin 2/65 (22 overs)	Edgbaston, Birmingham; Umpires: Rob Bailey and David Millns
Sussex won the toss and elected to bat; Points: Warwickshire 9, Sussex 9

29 June – 2 July	(H) Nottinghamshire	v	Worcestershire	Nottinghamshire won by 113 runs
Scorecard	240 (66.3 overs); BRM Taylor 69 (120); CAJ Morris 3/70 (14 overs)		283 (86.3 overs); RK Oliver 99 (173); BW Hilfenhaus 4/67 (25 overs)	Trent Bridge, Nottingham; Umpires: Jeremy Lloyds and Martin Saggers
Scorecard	366 (126.4 overs); CMW Read 73 (122); JD Shantry 5/48 (35.4 overs)		210 (82.4 overs); DKH Mitchell 76 (204); A Carter 4/46 (12.4 overs)	Trent Bridge, Nottingham; Umpires: Jeremy Lloyds and Martin Saggers
Worcestershire won the toss and elected to field; Points: Nottinghamshire 20, Worcestershire 5

==== July ====
5–8 July	Middlesex	v	(H) Nottinghamshire	Match drawn
Scorecard	374 (108 overs); DJ Malan 182* (270); HF Gurney 3/68 (22 overs)		419 (136.3 overs); CMW Read 108 (206); JEC Franklin 3/41 (15 overs)	Trent Bridge, Nottingham; Umpires: Ben Debenham and Russell Evans
Scorecard	162 (47 overs); SD Robson 77* (148); HF Gurney 1/17 (17 overs)			Trent Bridge, Nottingham; Umpires: Ben Debenham and Russell Evans
Nottinghamshire won the toss and elected to field; Points: Nottinghamshire 11, Middlesex 11

5–8 July	Sussex	v	(H) Somerset	Match drawn
Scorecard	208 (84.5 overs); LWP Wells 54 (122); AC Thomas 4/46 (24.2 overs)		274 (73.5 overs); JC Hildreth 82 (136); OE Robinson 4/79 (22 overs)	County Ground, Taunton; Umpires: Steve Garratt and Steve O'Shaughnessy
Scorecard	490/4d (47 overs); MW Machan 192 (237); Abdur Rehman 2/121 (26 overs)		208/6 (67.3 overs); PD Trego 95* (141); LWP Wells 3/56 (18.3 overs)	County Ground, Taunton; Umpires: Steve Garratt and Steve O'Shaughnessy
Somerset won the toss and elected to field; Points: Somerset 10, Sussex 9

5–8 July	Yorkshire	v	(H) Warwickshire	Yorkshire won by 174 runs
Scorecard	213 (66.2 overs); JM Bairstow 108 (139); CJC Wright 5/40 (16.2 overs)		69 (28.1 overs); R Clarke 28 (42); RJ Sidebottom 6/34 (12 overs)	Edgbaston, Birmingham; Umpires: Mike Burns and Alex Wharf
Scorecard	289/7d (80 overs); WMH Rhodes 79 (186); OJ Hannon-Dalby 3/80 (21 overs)		259 (85.5 overs); SR Hain 106 (195); RJ Sidebottom 5/42 (19 overs)	Edgbaston, Birmingham; Umpires: Mike Burns and Alex Wharf
Yorkshire won the toss and elected to bat; Points: Yorkshire 20, Warwickshire 3

6–9 July	(H) Worcestershire	v	Hampshire	Worcestershire won by an innings and 33 runs
Scorecard	478 (141 overs); DKH Mitchell 206* (413); JM Bird 4/146 (35 overs)		183 (67 overs); JM Vince 56 (101); Saeed Ajmal 5/28 (17 overs)	County Ground, New Road, Worcester; Umpires: Neil Bainton and Graham Lloyd
Scorecard			262 (88.3 overs) (f/o); JS Gatting 59 (131); JD Shantry 5/51 (20.3 overs)	County Ground, New Road, Worcester; Umpires: Neil Bainton and Graham Lloyd
Worcestershire won the toss and elected to bat; Points: Worcestershire 23, Hampshire 2

11–14 July	(H) Middlesex	v	Somerset	Match drawn
Scorecard	283 (93.1 overs); DJ Malan 69 (183); L Gregory 5/58 (15.1 overs)		197 (75 overs); ME Trescothick 52 (124); ST Finn 4/41 (21 overs)	Merchant Taylors' School Ground, Northwood; Umpires: Stephen Gale and Neil Mallender
Scorecard	132/6d (29 overs); JEC Franklin 32 (25); J Overton 2/28 (7 overs)		147/7 (39.4 overs); ME Trescothick 50 (86); TJ Murtagh 3/43 (12 overs)	Merchant Taylors' School Ground, Northwood; Umpires: Stephen Gale and Neil Mallender
Middlesex won the toss and elected to bat; Points: Middlesex 10, Somerset 8

12–15 July	(H) Durham	v	Warwickshire	Warwickshire won by 2 wickets
Scorecard	314 (89.2 overs); MD Stoneman 112 (149); R Clarke 5/62 (21.2 overs)		198 (58.4 overs); SR Hain 57 (111); Chris Rushworth 5/43 (20 overs)	Riverside Ground, Chester-le-Street; Umpires: Graham Lloyd and David Millns
Scorecard	148 (50.3 overs); J Harrison 53 (81); R Clarke 3/19 (16 overs)		265 (67.3 overs); LJ Evans 70 (109); G Onions 3/79 (21.3 overs)	Riverside Ground, Chester-le-Street; Umpires: Graham Lloyd and David Millns
Durham won the toss and elected to bat; Points: Warwickshire 19, Durham 6

18–21 July	Somerset	v	(H) Warwickshire	Warwickshire won by 7 wickets
Scorecard	265 (83.1 overs); C Overton 51 (51); JS Patel 5/89 (24 overs)		365 (115.5 overs); SR Hain 103* (169); C Overton 6/74 (23.5 overs)	Edgbaston, Birmingham; Umpires: Paul Baldwin and Ben Debenham
Scorecard	170 (51.4 overs); TB Abell 88 (142); R Clarke 4/43 (12 overs)		74/3 (28.3 overs); LJ Evans 36 (84); C Overton 1/12 (5 overs)	Edgbaston, Birmingham; Umpires: Paul Baldwin and Ben Debenham
Somerset won the toss and elected to bat; Points: Warwickshire 22, Somerset 4

19–22 July	Durham	v	(H) Hampshire	Match drawn
Scorecard	421 (131.5 overs); GJ Muchall 145 (297); LA Dawson 3/70 (28.5 overs)		307 (110.1 overs); WR Smith 85 (212); C Rushworth 6/39 (22.1 overs)	The Rose Bowl, Southampton; Umpires: Nick Cook and CK Nandan
Scorecard	190/4d (44 overs); MD Stoneman 88 (125); MS Crane 4/72 (16 overs)		179/9 (66 overs); LD McManus 53* (166); RD Pringle 5/63 (26 overs)	The Rose Bowl, Southampton; Umpires: Nick Cook and CK Nandan
Durham won the toss and elected to bat; Mason Crane (Hampshire) and Graham Clark (Durham) made their first-class debuts; Points: Durham 11, Hampshire 10

19–21 July	Nottinghamshire	v	(H) Sussex	Nottinghamshire won by an innings and 103 runs
Scorecard	570/7d (136.1 overs); JWA Taylor 291 (385); OE Robinson 4/112 (31 overs)		213 (69 overs); LJ Wright 50 (92); HF Gurney 5/75 (19 overs)	Cricket Field Road Ground, Horsham; Umpires: Stephen Gale and Billy Taylor
Scorecard			254 (61 overs) (f/o); MW Machan 108 (106); L Wood 3/27 (10 overs)	Cricket Field Road Ground, Horsham; Umpires: Stephen Gale and Billy Taylor
Nottinghamshire won the toss and elected to bat; Points: Nottinghamshire 24, Sussex 2

19–22 July	(H) Yorkshire	v	Worcestershire	Yorkshire won by 7 wickets
Scorecard	430 (108.2 overs); AW Gale 164 (297); J Leach 4/139 (27 overs)		280 (75.3 overs); JM Clarke 88 (125); SA Patterson 3/34 (13 overs)	North Marine Road Ground, Scarborough; Umpires: Russell Evans and David Millns
Scorecard	157/3 (27.2 overs); AZ Lees 58* (87); CAJ Morris 1/49 (9 overs)		306 (90.4 overs) (f/o); RA Whiteley 101 (139); JA Brooks 3/41 (15 overs)	North Marine Road Ground, Scarborough; Umpires: Russell Evans and David Millns
Yorkshire won the toss and elected to bat; Points: Yorkshire 24, Worcestershire 5

==== August ====
7–10 August	(H) Hampshire	v	Warwickshire	Hampshire won by 216 runs
Scorecard	285 (108 overs); AJA Wheater 57 (84); WB Rankin 3/55 (23 overs)		125 (54 overs); V Chopra 37 (104); FH Edwards 5/32 (14 overs)	The Rose Bowl, Southampton; Umpires: Mike Burns and Ian Gould
Scorecard	283/3d (66 overs); JM Vince 125* (190); WB Rankin 2/46 (10 overs)		227 (74 overs); R Clarke 55 (70); FH Edwards 4/55 (19 overs)	The Rose Bowl, Southampton; Umpires: Mike Burns and Ian Gould
Hampshire won the toss and elected to bat; Points: Hampshire 21, Warwickshire 3

7–10 August	(H) Middlesex	v	Sussex	Middlesex won by 20 runs
Scorecard	234 (77.4 overs); DJ Malan 93 (178); SJ Magoffin 4/48 (21.4 overs)		300 (94.4 overs); MW Machan 81 (107); RH Patel 4/42 (17 overs)	Lord's, London; Umpires: Martin Bodenham and Martin Saggers
Scorecard	331 (113.1 overs); DJ Malan 120* (207); SJ Magoffin 5/73 (27.1 overs)		245 (69.4 overs); BC Brown 68 (129); JAR Harris 4/57 (16 overs)	Lord's, London; Umpires: Martin Bodenham and Martin Saggers
Middlesex won the toss and elected to bat; Points: Middlesex 20, Sussex 6

7–10 August	(H) Worcestershire	v	Nottinghamshire	Nottinghamshire won by 5 wickets
Scorecard	269 (68.1 overs); APR Gidman 71 (126); HF Gurney 3/47 (15.1 overs)		330 (81.3 overs); CMW Read 90 (137); CAJ Morris 3/48 (16 overs)	County Ground, New Road, Worcester; Umpires: Rob Bailey and Steve Garratt
Scorecard	292 (82.3 overs); RA Whiteley 78 (145); JT Ball 4/67 (15.3 overs)		234/5 (71.4 overs); MH Wessels 88 (190); CAJ Morris 2/45 (15 overs)	County Ground, New Road, Worcester; Umpires: Rob Bailey and Steve Garratt
Worcestershire won the toss and elected to bat; Points: Nottinghamshire 22, Worcestershire 5

7–10 August	(H) Yorkshire	v	Durham	Yorkshire won by 183 runs
Scorecard	162 (43 overs); TT Bresnan 47 (54); C Rushworth 4/37 (13 overs)		156 (43.2 overs); RD Pringle 40 (54); RJ Sidebottom 4/44 (13.2 overs)	North Marine Road Ground, Scarborough; Umpires: Nick Cook and Jeremy Lloyds
Scorecard	440 (103.2 overs); GJ Maxwell 140 (144); C Rushworth 3/53 (23 overs)		263 (68.1 overs); JTA Burnham 50 (115); LE Plunkett 4/61 (16.1 overs)	North Marine Road Ground, Scarborough; Umpires: Nick Cook and Jeremy Lloyds
Yorkshire won the toss and elected to bat; Jack Burnham (Durham) made his first-class debut; Points: Yorkshire 19, Durham 3

21–24 August	Middlesex	v	(H) Durham	Middlesex won by 71 runs
Scorecard	196 (62.5 overs); NRD Compton 71 (128); G Onions 7/68 (20 overs)		169 (47.3 overs); GJ Muchall 64 (109); JAR Harris 3/52 (10 overs)	Riverside Ground, Chester-le-Street; Umpires: Neil Mallender and Tim Robinson
Scorecard	280 (84.4 overs); NJ Dexter 112 (141); C Rushworth 5/49 (19.4 overs)		236 (64.1 overs); SG Borthwick 95 (177); JAR Harris 5/71 (15.1 overs)	Riverside Ground, Chester-le-Street; Umpires: Neil Mallender and Tim Robinson
Durham won the toss and elected to field; James Weighell (Durham) made his first-class debut; Points: Middlesex 19, Durham 3

21–24 August	(H) Nottinghamshire	v	Warwickshire	Nottinghamshire won by an innings and 123 runs
Scorecard	600 (140.3 overs); AD Hales 189 (216); CJC Wright 3/97 (25.3 overs)		260 (80.5 overs); KHD Barker 71 (76); JT Ball 3/35 (19 overs)	Trent Bridge, Nottingham; Umpires: Stephen Gale and Steve O'Shaughnessy
Scorecard			217 (95.1 overs) (f/o); WTS Porterfield 61 (166); SR Patel 4/23 (22.1 overs)	Trent Bridge, Nottingham; Umpires: Stephen Gale and Steve O'Shaughnessy
Warwickshire won the toss and elected to field; Points: Nottinghamshire 24, Warwickshire 4

21–24 August	(H) Somerset	v	Worcestershire	Match Drawn
Scorecard	565/5d (138.4 overs); JC Hildreth 220* (304); JD Shantry 2/84 (27.4 overs)		172/4 (41 overs); RA Whiteley 78* (101); L Gregory 2/61 (16 overs)	County Ground, Taunton; Umpires: Martin Bodenham and Jeff Evans
Worcestershire won the toss and elected to field; Points: Somerset 11, Worcestershire 6

21–24 August	Yorkshire	v	(H) Sussex	Match Drawn
Scorecard	494 (136.3 overs); GA Ballance 165 (266); OE Robinson 3/72 (30 overs)		493/7 (123 overs); MH Yardy 124 (233); AU Rashid 3/159 (33 overs)	County Ground, Hove; Umpires: Neil Bainton and Peter Hartley
Yorkshire won the toss and elected to bat; Points: Sussex 12, Yorkshire 11

==== September ====
1–4 September	(H) Durham	v	Hampshire	Hampshire won by 7 wickets
Scorecard	213 (63.1 overs); RD Pringle 99 (125); R McLaren 4/60 (18.1 overs)		251 (82.5 overs); SM Ervine 47 (69); JW Hastings 4/49 (20 overs)	Riverside Ground, Chester-le-Street; Umpires: Russell Evans and Jeremy Lloyds
Scorecard	200 (53.5 overs); PD Collingwood 37 (73); FH Edwards 4/43 (12.2 overs)		166/3 (34.3 overs); JM Vince 76* (65); G Onions 2/35 (13)	Riverside Ground, Chester-le-Street; Umpires: Russell Evans and Jeremy Lloyds
Durham won the toss and elected to bat; Ryan Stevenson (Hampshire) made his first-class debut; Points: Durham 4, Hampshire 21

1–4 September	(H) Warwickshire	v	Middlesex	Match Drawn
Scorecard	254 (96.3 overs); TR Ambrose 89 (166); TJ Murtagh 4/55 (25 overs)		207 (79.1 overs); NJ Dexter 53 (123); JS Patel 5/59 (25.1 overs)	Edgbaston, Birmingham; Umpires: Paul Baldwin and Alex Wharf
Scorecard			173/6 (62 overs); NJ Dexter 43 (74); JS Patel 3/65 (25 overs)	Edgbaston, Birmingham; Umpires: Paul Baldwin and Alex Wharf
Middlesex won the toss and chose to bat; Day 1 of match washed out due to rain; Points: Warwickshire 10, Middlesex 9

1–4 September	(H) Worcestershire	v	Sussex	Sussex won by an innings and 63 runs
Scorecard	210 (80 overs); APR Gidman 60* (117); CJ Jordan 5/68 (22 overs)		510/5d (116.4 overs); LJ Wright 226 (274); J Leach 2/113 (25.4 overs)	County Ground, New Road, Worcester; Umpires: Stephen Gale and Neil Mallender
Scorecard	237 (83.2 overs); JM Clarke 104* (185); Ashar Zaidi 3/55 (22 overs)			County Ground, New Road, Worcester; Umpires: Stephen Gale and Neil Mallender
Worcestershire won the toss and chose to bat; Points: Sussex 24, Worcestershire 2

1–4 September	(H) Yorkshire	v	Somerset	Yorkshire won by an innings and 126 runs
Scorecard	391 (128.2 overs); JM Bairstow 91 (124); GS Ballance 91 (188); C Overton 4/64 (28 overs)		110 (35 overs); L Ronchi 25 (43); JA Brooks 5/35 (12 overs)	Headingley, Leeds; Umpires: Steve Garratt and Ian Gould
Scorecard			155 (47.1 overs); JC Hildreth 57 (77); RJ Sidebottom 3/32 (11 overs)	Headingley, Leeds; Umpires: Steve Garratt and Ian Gould
Yorkshire won the toss and elected to field; Points: Yorkshire 22, Somerset 2

9–12 September	(H) Middlesex	v	Yorkshire	Middlesex won by 246 runs
Scorecard	106 (33 overs); JA Simpson 28 (22); RJ Sidebottom 5/18 (12 overs)		299 (72 overs); AW Gale 98 (110); NJ Dexter 3/24 (8 overs)	Lord's, London; Umpires: Steve O'Shaughnessy and Tim Robinson
Scorecard	573/8d (175 overs); NRD Compton 149 (261); JD Middlebrook 3/130 (40 overs)		134 (58 overs); AZ Lees 62 (129); TS Roland-Jones 5/27 (21 overs)	Lord's, London; Umpires: Steve O'Shaughnessy and Tim Robinson
Yorkshire won the toss and chose to field; Stephen Eskinazi (Middlesex) made his first-class debut; Points: Middlesex 19, Yorkshire 5

9–12 September	(H) Nottinghamshire	v	Durham	Nottinghamshire won by 52 runs
Scorecard	204 (54 overs); L Wood 65 (81); G Onions 5/56 (15 overs)		372 (88.2 overs); MJ Richardson 96* (138); BA Hutton 5/77 (22.2 overs)	Trent Bridge, Nottingham; Umpires: Mike Burns and David Millns
Scorecard	382 (101.1 overs); SR Patel 100 (155); G Onions 3/86 (24 overs)		162 (40.4 overs); BJ McCarthy 38* (59); BA Hutton 5/29 (10.4 overs)	Trent Bridge, Nottingham; Umpires: Mike Burns and David Millns
Durham won the toss and chose to field; Barry McCarthy (Durham) made his first-class debut; Points: Nottinghamshire 20, Durham 7

9–12 September	(H) Somerset	v	Hampshire	Match Drawn
Scorecard	630/9d (136.5 overs); ME Trescothick 153 (261); LA Dawson 5/139 (34.5 overs)		240 (62.4 overs); JM Vince 60 (75); J Overton 4/37 (10.4 overs)	County Ground, Taunton; Umpires: Jeff Evans and Graham Lloyd
Scorecard			411/4 (159 overs); JHK Adams 136 (313); PD Trego 1/11 (8 overs)	County Ground, Taunton; Umpires: Jeff Evans and Graham Lloyd
Somerset won the toss and chose to field; Points: Somerset 13, Hampshire 7

14–17 September	(H) Durham	v	Worcestershire	Durham won by 3 wickets
Scorecard	277 (64 overs); SG Borthwick 73 (98); BL D'Oliveira 5/48 (15 overs)		350/7d (101.4 overs); T Kohler-Cadmore 89 (133); RD Pringle 3/94 (25.4 overs)	Riverside Ground, Chester-le-Street; Umpires: Richard Kettleborough and Nigel Llong
Scorecard	291/7 (66.4 overs); SG Borthwick 99 (121); ST Gabriel 2/56 (12 overs)		217/9d (34 overs); BL D'Oliveira 49 (56); RD Pringle 3/45 (5 overs)	Riverside Ground, Chester-le-Street; Umpires: Richard Kettleborough and Nigel Llong
Durham won the toss and chose to field; Points: Durham 20, Worcestershire 7

14–17 September	(H) Hampshire	v	Yorkshire	Yorkshire won by 5 wickets
Scorecard	400/9d (108.5 overs); LA Dawson 140 (212); JA Brooks 3/97 (22 overs)		97/4d (41.4 overs); AZ Lees 37* (121); R McLaren 2/33 (14.4 overs)	Rose Bowl, Southampton; Umpires: Peter Hartley and Tim Robinson
Scorecard	0/0d		305/5 (91.2 overs); AW Gale 125 (225); FH Edwards 3/74 (20 overs)	Rose Bowl, Southampton; Umpires: Peter Hartley and Tim Robinson
Yorkshire won the toss and chose to field; Points: Yorkshire 19, Hampshire 6

14–17 September	(H) Sussex	v	Somerset	Match drawn
Scorecard	409 (104.1 overs); MH Yardy 104 (165); PD Trego 3/72 (21 overs)		438/4 (100 overs); ME Trescothick 210* (272); CJ Jordan 3/110 (24 overs)	County Ground, Hove; Umpires: Ian Gould and Alex Wharf
Sussex, who chose to bat; Points: Somerset 13, Sussex 11

14–17 September	(H) Warwickshire	v	Nottinghamshire	Match drawn
Scorecard	187 (46.2 overs); LJ Evans 34 (36); JT Ball 4/48 (12 overs)		365 (107.3 overs); JWA Taylor 164 (260); KHD Barker 5/68 (30 overs)	Edgbaston, Birmingham; Umpires: Nick Cook and Martin Saggers
Warwickshire won the toss and chose to field; Points: Nottinghamshire 12, Warwickshire 8

22–25 September	(H) Nottinghamshire	v	Hampshire	Hampshire won by 8 wickets
Scorecard	340 (92.3 overs); MH Wessels 104 (172); FH Edwards 6/88 (21 overs)		326 (89.5 overs); GK Berg 72 (109); HF Gurney 4/70 (19 overs)	Trent Bridge, Nottingham; Umpires: Jeremy Lloyds and Steven O'Shaughnessy
Scorecard	185 (62 overs); BRM Taylor 90 (151); FH Edwards 4/57 (17 overs)		200/2 (53.3 overs); MA Carberry 84* (157); JT Ball 2/30 (10 overs)	Trent Bridge, Nottingham; Umpires: Jeremy Lloyds and Steven O'Shaughnessy
Hampshire won the toss and chose to field; Points: Hampshire 22, Nottinghamshire 6

22–25 September	(H) Somerset	v	Warwickshire	Somerset won by 17 runs
Scorecard	438 (100.1 overs); JC Hildreth 118 (175); KHD Barker 4/94 (24 overs)		324 (110.3 overs); JS Patel 98 (164); MJ Leach 7/106 (40 overs)	County Ground, Taunton; Umpires: Rob Bailey and Alex Wharf
Scorecard	110 (34 overs); TLW Cooper 26 (66); JS Patel 7/38 (14 overs)		207 (64.1 overs); IR Bell 55 (126); TLW Cooper 5/76 (18 overs)	County Ground, Taunton; Umpires: Rob Bailey and Alex Wharf
Somerset won the toss and chose to bat; Mark Adair (Warwickshire) made his first-class debut; Points: Somerset 24, Warwickshire 6

22–25 September	(H) Worcestershire	v	Middlesex	Worcestershire won by an innings & 128 runs
Scorecard	431/5d (114 overs); TC Fell 171 (267); NJ Dexter 3/51 (23 overs)		98 (34.1 overs); JA Simpson 27* (60); ST Gabriel 5/31 (9 overs)	County Ground, New Road, Worcester; Umpires: Ian Gould and Tim Robinson
Scorecard			205 (45 overs); JA Simpson 50* (49); JD Shantry 3/51 (16 overs)	County Ground, New Road, Worcester; Umpires: Ian Gould and Tim Robinson
Worcestershire won the toss and chose to field; Points: Worcestershire 24, Middlesex 1

22–25 September	(H) Yorkshire	v	Sussex	Yorkshire won by 100 runs
Scorecard	251 (83.2 overs); GS Ballance 55 (119); SJ Magoffin 4/57 (24.2 overs)		248 (55.5 overs); MH Yardy 70 (81); JA Brooks 3/55 (12 overs)	Headingley, Leeds; Umpires: Michael Gough and David Millns
Scorecard	305 (104.3 overs); AW Gale 67 (131); SJ Magoffin 3/57 (22.3 overs)		208 (57.3 overs); Ashar Zaidi 47 (40); TT Bresnan 3/30 (12 overs)	Headingley, Leeds; Umpires: Michael Gough and David Millns
Sussex won the toss and chose to field; Points: Yorkshire 22, Sussex 4

=== Division Two ===
==== April ====
12–15 April	Glamorgan	v	(H) Leicestershire	Match drawn
Scorecard	513/9d (120 overs); WD Bragg 120 (226); A Sheikh 3/108 (18 overs)		435 (120.3 overs); EJH Eckersley 147 (279); A Carter 4/95 (26.3 overs)	Grace Road, Leicester; Umpires: Steve Garratt and Martin Saggers
Scorecard	227/7d (63.5 overs); CB Cooke 81 (124); OH Freckingham 2/47 (14 overs)		141/3 (38 overs); MJ Cosgrove 59* (113); GG Wagg 1/17 (6 overs)	Grace Road, Leicester; Umpires: Steve Garratt and Martin Saggers
Glamorgan won the toss and elected to bat; Points: Glamorgan 12, Leicestershire 11

12–15 April	(H) Northamptonshire	v	Gloucestershire	Match drawn
Scorecard	333 (83.5 overs); AM Rossington 95 (98); CN Miles 6/63 (19.5 overs)		296 (82.2 overs); GO Jones 80 (133); DJ Willey 4/72 (18 overs)	County Ground, Northampton; Umpires: Peter Hartley and Steve O'Shaughnessy
Scorecard	416/8d (97 overs); DJ Willey 104* (83); LC Norwell 2/47 (16 overs)		267/2 (95 overs); CDJ Dent 104* (285); RI Keogh 1/27 (15 overs)	County Ground, Northampton; Umpires: Peter Hartley and Steve O'Shaughnessy
Gloucestershire won the toss and elected to field; Points: Northamptonshire 11, Gloucestershire 10

19–22 April	Lancashire	v	(H) Derbyshire	Lancashire won by 250 runs
Scorecard	293 (98 overs); AN Petersen 115 (198); AP Palladino 3/70 (24 overs)		274 (78.5 overs); WJ Durston 85 (102); SC Kerrigan 3/21 (18.5 overs)	County Ground, Derby; Umpires: Mark Benson and Martin Bodenham
Scorecard	345 (91.5 overs); AG Prince 97 (163); TAI Taylor 6/61 (21 overs)		114 (41.2 overs); MJ Guptill 32 (61); KM Jarvis 5/13 (9 overs)	County Ground, Derby; Umpires: Mark Benson and Martin Bodenham
Derbyshire won the toss and elected to field; Derbyshire deducted 1 point for a slow over rate; Points: Lancashire 21, Derbyshire 4

19–21 April	Kent	v	(H) Essex	Essex won by 5 wickets
Scorecard	193 (68.5 overs); DI Stevens 50 (90); JD Ryder 5/43 (18 overs)		164 (46.5 overs); GR Napier 57 (40); DI Stevens 4/47 (13 overs)	County Ground, Chelmsford; Umpires: Paul Baldwin and Neil Mallender
Scorecard	163 (51 overs); SA Northeast 77 (124); DD Masters 4/45 (13 overs)		193/5 (51.3 overs); JS Foster 80* (103); ME Claydon 3/55 (14 overs)	County Ground, Chelmsford; Umpires: Paul Baldwin and Neil Mallender
Essex won the toss and elected to field; First-class debut: Daniel Lawrence (Essex); Points: Essex 19, Kent 3

19–22 April	Surrey	v	(H) Glamorgan	Match drawn
Scorecard	563/7d (146 overs); SM Davies 200* (290); A Carter 4/110 (35 overs)		419 (138.2 overs); CAJ Meschede 101* (130); GJ Batty 3/110 (43 overs)	SWALEC Stadium, Cardiff; Umpires: Peter Hartley and David Millns
Scorecard	207/4d (37 overs); KP Pietersen 53* (70); GG Wagg 2/46 (10 overs)		116/0 (37 overs); JA Rudolph 52* (114)	SWALEC Stadium, Cardiff; Umpires: Peter Hartley and David Millns
Surrey won the toss and elected to bat; Points: Surrey 12, Glamorgan 9

26–29 April	(H) Gloucestershire	v	Derbyshire	Derbyshire won by 7 wickets
Scorecard	275 (87.4 overs); GH Roderick 76 (155); MHA Footitt 3/72 (18 overs)		545/9d (113 overs); MJ Guptill 227 (176); MD Taylor 5/93 (28 overs)	County Ground, Bristol; Umpires: Rob Bailey and Martin Saggers
Scorecard	411 (123.5 overs); GH Roderick 75 (119); MHA Footitt 6/94 (34 overs)		142/3 (33.5 overs); BA Godleman 51 (62); JK Fuller 2/51 (9 overs)	County Ground, Bristol; Umpires: Rob Bailey and Martin Saggers
Derbyshire won the toss and elected to field; Points: Derbyshire 24, Gloucestershire 4

26–29 April	(H) Lancashire	v	Kent	Lancashire won by 9 wickets
Scorecard	444 (127.1 overs); AG Prince 106 (172); ME Claydon 4/103 (30.1 overs)		252 (71.2 overs); SA Northeast 55 (129); KM Jarvis 4/50 (18 overs)	Old Trafford, Manchester; Umpires: Jeff Evans and Tim Robinson
Scorecard	107/1 (18.4 overs); PJ Horton 67* (62); ME Claydon 1/30 (6.4 overs)		295 (123.4 overs) (f/o); JL Denly 60 (127); KM Jarvis 4/67 (28 overs)	Old Trafford, Manchester; Umpires: Jeff Evans and Tim Robinson
Lancashire won the toss and elected to bat; First-class debut: Jordan Clark (Lancashire); Points: Lancashire 23, Kent 4

26–29 April	Northamptonshire	v	(H) Leicestershire	Northamptonshire won by 92 runs
Scorecard	251 (72.1 overs); RI Newton 71 (105); BA Raine 4/55 (16 overs)		305 (80.5 overs); AJ Robson 75 (123); OP Stone 3/68 (18 overs)	Grace Road, Leicester; Umpires: Neil Bainton and Michael Gough
Scorecard	429 (114.1 overs); DJ Willey 88 (79); CE Shreck 4/91 (28.1 overs)		283 (75.5 overs); NJ O'Brien 58 (65); RK Kleinveldt 4/87 (23.5 overs)	Grace Road, Leicester; Umpires: Neil Bainton and Michael Gough
Leicestershire won the toss and elected to field; Points: Northamptonshire 19, Leicestershire 6

26–29 April	(H) Surrey	v	Essex	Match drawn
Scorecard	340 (112.5 overs); SM Davies 81 (139); GR Napier 3/63 (21.5 overs)		610/8d (140.4 overs); DW Lawrence 161 (206); ZS Ansari 4/149 (35 overs)	The Oval, London; Umpires: Martin Bodenham and Nick Cook
Scorecard	95/2 (32 overs); KC Sangakkara 43 (64); GR Napier 1/21 (7 overs)			The Oval, London; Umpires: Martin Bodenham and Nick Cook
Essex won the toss and elected to field; Points: Essex 12, Surrey 9

==== May ====
3–5 May	(H) Essex	v	Gloucestershire	Gloucestershire won by 9 wickets
Scorecard	159 (45.4 overs); JC Mickleburgh 42 (67); LC Norwell 4/32 (12 overs)		245 (72.2 overs); PSP Handscomb 66 (98); JA Porter 4/59 (20 overs)	County Ground, Chelmsford; Umpires: Rob Bailey and Neil Mallender
Scorecard	199 (68.5 overs); KS Velani 58 (91); LC Norwell 6/33 (18.5 overs)		114/1 (21.2 overs); WA Tavaré 57 (64); JA Porter 1/43 (5.2 overs)	County Ground, Chelmsford; Umpires: Rob Bailey and Neil Mallender
Gloucestershire won the toss and elected to field; Points: Gloucestershire 20, Essex 3

3–6 May	Derbyshire	v	(H) Glamorgan	Match drawn
Scorecard	205 (63.1 overs); BT Slater 53 (122); A Carter 4/53 (19 overs)		103/4d (36.5 overs); JA Rudolph 43 (67); SJ Thakor 2/11 (7 overs)	SWALEC Stadium, Cardiff; Umpires: Nigel Cowley and Alex Wharf
Scorecard	209/2d (55 overs); SL Elstone 103* (131); MG Hogan 1/30 (10 overs)			SWALEC Stadium, Cardiff; Umpires: Nigel Cowley and Alex Wharf
Glamorgan won the toss and elected to field; First-class debut: Matthew Critchley (Derbyshire) Play limited to 15.5 overs on Day 1 due to rain; Points: Glamorgan 8, Derbyshire 7

3–6 May	Leicestershire	v	(H) Kent	Match drawn
Scorecard	386 (91.5 overs); MJ Cosgrove 113 (130); DI Stevens 5/88 (22.5 overs)		268 (90.5 overs); JL Denly 87 (214); CJ McKay 6/54 (23.5 overs)	St Lawrence Ground, Canterbury; Umpires: David Millns and Steve O'Shaughnessy
Scorecard	196 (62.3 overs); CJ McKay 43 (36); IAA Thomas 4/48 (17 overs)		273/7 (71 overs); DJ Bell-Drummond 103 (191); CE Shreck 4/75 (23 overs)	St Lawrence Ground, Canterbury; Umpires: David Millns and Steve O'Shaughnessy
Kent won the toss and elected to field; First-class debut: Lewis Hill (Leicestershire); Points: Leicestershire 12, Kent 10

3–6 May	(H) Northamptonshire	v	Lancashire	Match drawn
Scorecard	385 (92.4 overs); SP Crook 91 (89); J Clark 4/101 (22.4 overs)		436 (107.2 overs); AG Prince 153 (217); RK Kleinveldt 5/99 (27.2 overs)	County Ground, Northampton; Umpires: Paul Baldwin and Martin Saggers
Scorecard	391/5 (92 overs); SP Crook 102* (95); J Clark 2/58 (13 overs)			County Ground, Northampton; Umpires: Paul Baldwin and Martin Saggers
Lancashire won the toss and elected to field; Play limited to 50.2 overs on Day 1 due to rain; Points: Lancashire 13, Northamptonshire 12

10–13 May	(H) Derbyshire	v	Northamptonshire	Match drawn
Scorecard	343 (92.5 overs); MJJ Critchley 137* (179); Azharullah 5/59 (20.5 overs)		324 (61 overs); DJ Willey 103 (103); TAI Taylor 3/72 (16 overs)	County Ground, Derby; Umpires: Tim Robinson and Billy Taylor
Scorecard	407/5d (121.5 overs); CF Hughes 104 (252); DJ Willey 3/70 (22 overs)		390/9 (104 overs); RI Keogh 163* (266); MHA Footitt 4/94 (22 overs)	County Ground, Derby; Umpires: Tim Robinson and Billy Taylor
Northamptonshire won the toss and elected to field; Points: Derbyshire 11, Northamptonshire 11

10–13 May	(H) Kent	v	Glamorgan	Match drawn
Scorecard	357 (102 overs); DJ Bell-Drummond 123 (249); MG Hogan 5/71 (28 overs)		281 (84 overs); WD Bragg 104 (208); IAA Thomas 3/40 (17 overs)	St Lawrence Ground, Canterbury; Umpires: Rob Bailey and Nick Cook
Scorecard	327 (83.4 overs); JL Denly 66 (112); MG Hogan 4/65 (19.4 overs)		309/9 (107 overs); DA Cosker 69 (183); CJ Haggett 4/61 (23 overs)	St Lawrence Ground, Canterbury; Umpires: Rob Bailey and Nick Cook
Kent won the toss and elected to bat; Points: Kent 12, Glamorgan 10

10–13 May	Gloucestershire	v	(H) Lancashire	Gloucestershire won by 91 runs
Scorecard	388 (109 overs); CDJ Dent 116 (247); KM Jarvis 4/121 (31 overs)		364 (116.2 overs); PJ Horton 168 (298); LC Norwell 4/95 (29 overs)	Old Trafford, Manchester; Umpires: Michael Gough and Graham Lloyd
Scorecard	275/9d (86.4 overs); HJH Marshall 92 (177); PM Siddle 4/39 (18.4 overs)		208 (56.5 overs); AN Petersen 63 (92); CN Miles 4/58 (14.5 overs)	Old Trafford, Manchester; Umpires: Michael Gough and Graham Lloyd
Gloucestershire won the toss and elected to bat; Points: Gloucestershire 22, Lancashire 7

10–13 May	Leicestershire	v	(H) Surrey	Surrey won by 7 wickets
Scorecard	292 (66 overs); LJ Hill 126 (147); MP Dunn 4/72 (18 overs)		557 (130.5 overs); KP Pietersen 355* (396); BA Raine 4/124 (29.5 overs)	The Oval, London; Umpires: Paul Baldwin and Nigel Cowley
Scorecard	480 (161.1 overs); EJH Eckersley 118 (158); ZS Ansari 6/152 (51.1 overs)		218/3 (21.2 overs); SM Davies 115* (69); JKH Naik 2/54 (6 overs)	The Oval, London; Umpires: Paul Baldwin and Nigel Cowley
Leicestershire won the toss and elected to bat; Points: Surrey 24, Leicestershire 5

17–20 May	Lancashire	v	(H) Leicestershire	Lancashire won by 244 runs
Scorecard	368 (98.4 overs); SJ Croft 102 (156); TJ Wells 3/68 (15 overs)		249 (56.1 overs); MJ Cosgrove 79 (138); KM Jarvis 5/69 (19.1 overs)	Grace Road, Leicester; Umpires: Martin Bodenham and Steve O'Shaughnessy
Scorecard	203/5d (45 overs); AG Prince 76* (106); CJ McKay 2/54 (15 overs)		78 (30.3 overs); CJ McKay 24 (35); TE Bailey 5/12 (9 overs)	Grace Road, Leicester; Umpires: Martin Bodenham and Steve O'Shaughnessy
Leicestershire won the toss and elected to field; Points: Lancashire 23, Leicestershire 4

18–21 May	(H) Glamorgan	v	Essex	Glamorgan won by 89 runs
Scorecard	314 (93.3 overs); JA Rudolph 82 (222); DD Masters 3/51 (29 overs)		221 (61.3 overs); RN ten Doeschate 49 (89); GG Wagg 5/54 (12.3 overs)	SWALEC Stadium, Cardiff; Umpires: Graham Lloyd and Jeremy Lloyds
Scorecard	270 (55.5 overs); MA Wallace 79 (87); Adeel Malik 3/39 (9.5 overs)		274 (87.4 overs); RN ten Doeschate 74* (118); AG Salter 3/54 (27 overs)	SWALEC Stadium, Cardiff; Umpires: Graham Lloyd and Jeremy Lloyds
Essex won the toss and elected to field; First-class debut: Callum Taylor (Essex); Points: Glamorgan 22, Essex 4

18–21 May	(H) Gloucestershire	v	Kent	Kent won by 8 wickets
Scorecard	193 (64.4 overs); PSP Handscomb 69 (114); MT Coles 3/49 (19 overs)		235 (84 overs); MT Coles 66 (83); LC Norwell 4/44 (24 overs)	County Ground, Bristol; Umpires: Russell Evans and Richard Kettleborough
Scorecard	282 (86.1 overs); HJH Marshall 83 (131); IAA Thomas 4/53 (19.1 overs)		243/2 (64.4 overs); JL Denly 117* (197); CN Miles 1/49 (14 overs)	County Ground, Bristol; Umpires: Russell Evans and Richard Kettleborough
Kent won the toss and elected to field; Points: Kent 20, Gloucestershire 3

18–21 May	(H) Northamptonshire	v	Surrey	Match drawn
Scorecard	309 (84.4 overs); RI Newton 95 (143); TK Curran 4/89 (23 overs)		499/6d (118 overs); JJ Roy 140 (145); Azharullah 2/75 (21 overs)	County Ground, Northampton; Umpires: Neil Bainton and Michael Gough
Surrey won the toss and elected to field; No play on Day 1 due to rain; Points: Surrey 13, Northamptonshire 10

24–27 May	(H) Kent	v	Surrey	Surrey won by 3 wickets
Scorecard	282 (85.3 overs); RWT Key 89 (134); TK Curran 3/64 (22 overs)		292 (100.1 overs); SM Davies 45 (89); DI Stevens 4/48 (19.1 overs)	Kent County Cricket Ground, Beckenham; Umpires: Peter Hartley and Paul Pollard
Scorecard	204 (65.4 overs); JL Denly 66 (152); ZS Ansari 4/58 (21 overs)		196/7 (50.1 overs); JJ Roy 60* (51); DI Stevens 3/29 (10 overs)	Kent County Cricket Ground, Beckenham; Umpires: Peter Hartley and Paul Pollard
Kent won the toss and elected to bat; Points: Surrey 21, Kent 5

24–27 May	Derbyshire	v	(H) Lancashire	Lancashire won by an innings and 15 runs
Scorecard	370 (106.3 overs); BA Godleman 75 (127); KM Jarvis 4/132 (27.3 overs)		551 (130.1 overs); AG Prince 230 (349); TAI Taylor 4/113 (27 overs)	Trafalgar Road Ground, Southport; Umpires: Rob Bailey and Nick Cook
Scorecard	166 (83.1 overs); BT Slater 58 (143); AM Lilley 5/23 (26.1 overs)			Trafalgar Road Ground, Southport; Umpires: Rob Bailey and Nick Cook
Derbyshire won the toss and elected to bat; Points: Lancashire 24, Derbyshire 6

31 May – 3 June	Gloucestershire	v	(H) Derbyshire	Match drawn
Scorecard	329 (86.4 overs); JMR Taylor 120 (139); MHA Footitt 4/60 (24.4 overs)		77/2d (32 overs); BA Godleman 30* (98); BAC Howell 1/7 (6 overs)	County Ground, Derby; Umpires: Steve Garratt and Tim Robinson
Scorecard	49/0d (14 overs); WA Tavaré 26* (44)		189/8 (81 overs); BA Godleman 64* (228); DA Payne 3/36 (19 overs)	County Ground, Derby; Umpires: Steve Garratt and Tim Robinson
Derbyshire won the toss and elected to field; No play on Day 3 due to a wet outfield; Points: Derbyshire 8, Gloucestershire 8

31 May – 3 June	(H) Essex	v	Leicestershire	Leicestershire won by 6 wickets
Scorecard	166 (61.3 overs); JD Ryder 38 (66); BA Raine 5/48 (18 overs)		280 (84.5 overs); AJ Robson 120 (237); GR Napier 3/62 (19 overs)	County Ground, Chelmsford; Umpires: Stephen Gale and Nigel Llong
Scorecard	276 (94.2 overs); T Westley 97 (232); CE Shreck 5/71 (26.2 overs)		163/4 (44.3 overs); AJ Robson 71 (125); JA Porter 3/38 (10 overs)	County Ground, Chelmsford; Umpires: Stephen Gale and Nigel Llong
Leicestershire won the toss and elected to field; First-class debut: Aron Nijjar (Essex); Points: Leicestershire 21, Essex 3; Leicestershire's first County Championship win since September 2012, ending a 37 match winless streak

31 May – 3 June	(H) Glamorgan	v	Northamptonshire	Glamorgan won by 10 wickets
Scorecard	371 (71.3 overs); CAJ Meschede 107 (109); RK Kleinveldt 3/91 (19.3 overs)		157 (48 overs); JJ Cobb 54 (99); AG Salter 3/5 (4 overs)	SWALEC Stadium, Cardiff; Umpires: Mike Burns and Richard Illingworth
Scorecard	57/0 (20.5 overs); JA Rudolph 29* (52)		269 (84.2 overs) (f/o); RI Newton 107 (192); AG Salter 3/64 (21 overs)	SWALEC Stadium, Cardiff; Umpires: Mike Burns and Richard Illingworth
Northamptonshire won the toss and elected to field; Points: Glamorgan 23, Northamptonshire 3

31 May – 3 June	(H) Surrey	v	Lancashire	Match drawn
Scorecard	448 (117 overs); JJ Roy 143 (166); KM Jarvis 4/118 (26 overs)		429 (112 overs); JP Faulkner 121 (152); MP Dunn 3/76 (20 overs)	The Oval, London; Umpires: Billy Taylor and Alex Wharf
Scorecard	186/0d (61 overs); RJ Burns 110* (200)			The Oval, London; Umpires: Billy Taylor and Alex Wharf
Lancashire won the toss and elected to field; Points: Surrey 13, Lancashire 12

==== June ====
7–10 June	Lancashire	v	(H) Gloucestershire	Lancashire won by 91 runs
Scorecard	275 (83.5 overs); SJ Croft 65 (94); CN Miles 5/61 (20 overs)		277 (91.3 overs); M Klinger 102 (209); TE Bailey 4/52 (21 overs)	County Ground, Bristol; Umpires: Ben Debenham and Peter Hartley
Scorecard	253 (89 overs); KR Brown 56 (181); CN Miles 5/60 (24 overs)		160 (69 overs); CDJ Dent 54 (155); KM Jarvis 5/39 (21 overs)	County Ground, Bristol; Umpires: Ben Debenham and Peter Hartley
Gloucestershire won the toss and elected to field; Points: Lancashire 21, Gloucestershire 5

7–9 June	(H) Kent	v	Derbyshire	Derbyshire won by 8 wickets
Scorecard	205 (66.2 overs); SA Northeast 85 (118); MHA Footitt 5/45 (17 overs)		86 (32 overs); WJ Durston 35 (46); MT Coles 5/24 (12 overs)	St Lawrence Ground, Canterbury; Umpires: Russell Evans and David Millns
Scorecard	112 (36.4 overs); DJ Bell-Drummond 45 (66); WA White 6/25 (9.4 overs)		232/2 (63.2 overs); CF Hughes 94 (179); MT Coles 2/75 (19 overs)	St Lawrence Ground, Canterbury; Umpires: Russell Evans and David Millns
Kent won the toss and elected to bat; First-class debut: Ryan Davies (Kent); Points: Derbyshire 19, Kent 4

7–9 June	Surrey	v	(H) Leicestershire	Surrey won by 178 runs
Scorecard	261 (85.1 overs); DP Sibley 74 (154); BA Raine 3/33 (14.1 overs)		190 (47.5 overs); AJ Robson 68 (83); JE Burke 4/19 (6 overs)	Grace Road, Leicester; Umpires: Graham Lloyd and Neil Mallender
Scorecard	284 (72 overs); SM Davies 47* (66); CE Shreck 4/67 (23 overs)		177 (48 overs); NJ O'Brien 54 (66); TK Curran 5/53 (16 overs)	Grace Road, Leicester; Umpires: Graham Lloyd and Neil Mallender
Leicestershire won the toss and elected to field; Points: Surrey 21, Leicestershire 3

7–10 June	Essex	v	(H) Northamptonshire	Match drawn
Scorecard	276 (82 overs); JD Ryder 87 (126); RI Keogh 3/35 (16 overs)		444 (120 overs); RE Levi 168 (231); GR Napier 3/85 (23 overs)	County Ground, Northampton; Umpires: Rob Bailey and Mark Benson
Scorecard	506/9d (136 overs); T Westley 179 (228); RK Kleinveldt 5/138 (31 overs)		115/3 (33 overs); RE Levi 53 (63); RJW Topley 1/14 (5 overs)	County Ground, Northampton; Umpires: Rob Bailey and Mark Benson
Essex won the toss and elected to bat; Points: Northamptonshire 13, Essex 9

14–16 June	Derbyshire	v	(H) Essex	Essex won by an innings and 31 runs
Scorecard	148 (35 overs); SJ Thakor 44 (53); JA Porter 4/28 (10 overs)		473 (138.5 overs); AN Cook 80 (164); WA White 6/113 (27.5 overs)	County Ground, Chelmsford; Umpires: Nigel Cowley and Jeff Evans
Scorecard	294 (84 overs); WL Madsen 112 (163); GR Napier 4/64 (23 overs)			County Ground, Chelmsford; Umpires: Nigel Cowley and Jeff Evans
Essex won the toss and elected to field; Points: Essex 23, Derbyshire 2

14–16 June	Leicestershire	v	(H) Lancashire	Lancashire won by an innings and 157 runs
Scorecard	207 (50 overs); AP Agathangelou 54 (66); TE Bailey 4/69 (20 overs)		483 (124.3 overs); AG Prince 104 (171); JKH Naik 8/179 (44.3 overs)	Old Trafford, Manchester; Umpires: Stephen Gale and Martin Saggers
Scorecard	119 (48.4 overs); AJ Robson 27 (40); KM Jarvis 5/44 (15.4 overs)			Old Trafford, Manchester; Umpires: Stephen Gale and Martin Saggers
Leicestershire won the toss and elected to bat; Points: Lancashire 23, Leicestershire 2

15–18 June	(H) Surrey	v	Glamorgan	Glamorgan won by 7 wickets
Scorecard	406 (121.4 overs); A Harinath 120 (213); GG Wagg 4/89 (24.4 overs)		437 (83.2 overs); GG Wagg 200 (216); TK Curran 4/153 (24 overs)	Woodbridge Road, Guildford; Umpires: Paul Baldwin and Steve O'Shaughnessy
Scorecard	277 (80.5 overs); A Harinath 104 (156); MG Hogan 5/44 (21 overs)		247/3 (63.1 overs); WD Bragg 83 (170); A Kapil 1/13 (2 overs)	Woodbridge Road, Guildford; Umpires: Paul Baldwin and Steve O'Shaughnessy
Surrey won the toss and elected to bat; Points: Glamorgan 23, Surrey 6

20–22 June	Kent	v	(H) Northamptonshire	Northamptonshire won by 8 wickets
Scorecard	140 (36.2 overs); SA Northeast 36 (41); Azharullah 5/31 (13 overs)		246 (71 overs); RI Keogh 68 (99); MT Coles 4/83 (24 overs)	County Ground, Northampton; Umpires: Steve Garratt and Neil Mallender
Scorecard	151 (38.5 overs); JL Denly 39 (70); OP Stone 5/44 (10 overs)		46/2 (9 overs); RI Newton 27 (20); IAA Thomas 1/8 (3 overs)	County Ground, Northampton; Umpires: Steve Garratt and Neil Mallender
Northamptonshire won the toss and elected to field; Points: Northamptonshire 20, Kent 3

21–23 June	Surrey	v	(H) Derbyshire	Surrey won by 222 runs
Scorecard	239 (72.5 overs); GC Wilson 65 (121); WA White 3/43 (15 overs)		207 (65 overs); HD Rutherford 59 (112); LJ Fletcher 4/58 (20 overs)	County Ground, Derby; Umpires: Nick Cook and Peter Hartley
Scorecard	315 (90.2 overs); JE Burke 73 (116); MHA Footitt 4/102 (26 overs)		125 (39.5 overs); WA White 23 (45); GJ Batty 4/32 (6.5 overs)	County Ground, Derby; Umpires: Nick Cook and Peter Hartley
Derbyshire won the toss and elected to field; Points: Surrey 20, Derbyshire 4

21–23 June	Essex	v	(H) Gloucestershire	Essex won by 5 wickets
Scorecard	319 (96 overs); JS Foster 63 (134); BAC Howell 3/50 (21 overs)		116 (39.5 overs); BAC Howell 29 (49); GR Napier 4/27 (9.5 overs)	County Ground, Bristol; Umpires: Stephen Gale and Jeremy Lloyds
Scorecard	117/5 (29 overs); T Westley 65* (87); JK Fuller 3/32 (9 overs)		316 (101.4 overs) (f/o); M Klinger 103 (196); GR Napier 3/53 (23 overs)	County Ground, Bristol; Umpires: Stephen Gale and Jeremy Lloyds
Essex won the toss and elected to bat; Points: Essex 22, Gloucestershire 3

22–25 June	(H) Glamorgan	v	Leicestershire	Glamorgan won by 137 runs
Scorecard	278 (79 overs); GG Wagg 94 (113); CJ McKay 3/61 (16 overs)		253 (86.4 overs); MAG Boyce 50 (141); MG Hogan 3/54 (16 overs)	SWALEC Stadium, Cardiff; Umpires: Mark Benson and Russell Evans
Scorecard	298 (87.2 overs); JA Rudolph 74 (230); BA Raine 5/43 (16 overs)		186 (73 overs); MAG Boyce 60 (148); GG Wagg 2/15 (12 overs)	SWALEC Stadium, Cardiff; Umpires: Mark Benson and Russell Evans
Glamorgan won the toss and elected to bat; Points: Glamorgan 21, Leicestershire 5

27–29 June	(H) Surrey	v	Gloucestershire	Surrey won by an innings and 180 runs
Scorecard	448 (144.5 overs); BT Foakes 118 (223); LC Norwell 5/112 (34.5 overs)		113 (44.3 overs); HJH Marshall 34* (105); TK Curran 7/20 (15 overs)	The Oval, London; Umpires: Neil Bainton and Mike Burns
Scorecard			155 (72.2 overs) (f/o); WA Tavaré 58 (132); ZS Ansari 6/30 (21.2 overs)	The Oval, London; Umpires: Neil Bainton and Mike Burns
Surrey won the toss and elected to bat; Points: Surrey 22, Gloucestershire 1

29 June – 2 July	Northamptonshire	v	(H) Lancashire	Match drawn
Scorecard	438 (110.3 overs); BM Duckett 134 (151); JP Faulkner 4/63 (28 overs)		308 (97.3 overs); KR Brown 97 (183); SP Crook 3/28 (9 overs)	Old Trafford, Manchester; Umpires: Russell Evans and Billy Taylor
Scorecard	283/9d (66.5 overs); BM Duckett 88 (109); SC Kerrigan 3/94 (21.5 overs)		206/7 (66.2 overs); KR Brown 82 (168); OP Stone 3/26 (14 overs)	Old Trafford, Manchester; Umpires: Russell Evans and Billy Taylor
Northamptonshire won the toss and elected to bat; Points: Northamptonshire 13, Lancashire 11

==== July ====
5–7 July	(H) Leicestershire	v	Kent	Kent won by 8 wickets
Scorecard	159 (51.1 overs); EJH Eckersley 41 (52); MT Coles 6/55 (15 overs)		210 (54.4 overs); DI Stevens 63 (72); OH Freckingham 3/32 (6 overs)	Grace Road, Leicester; Umpires: Stephen Gale and Neil Mallender
Scorecard	123 (48.2 overs); BA Raine 41 (74); MT Coles 4/43 (17.2 overs)		74/2 (15.2 overs); JL Denly 37 (48); BA Raine 2/34 (7.2 overs)	Grace Road, Leicester; Umpires: Stephen Gale and Neil Mallender
Kent won the toss and elected to field; Aadil Ali (Leicestershire) made his first-class debut.; Points: Kent 20, Leicestershire 3

6–9 July	Glamorgan	v	(H) Derbyshire	Match drawn
Scorecard	410/9d (79.3 overs); CA Ingram 89 (113); MHA Footitt 4/98 (25 overs)		252 (86 overs); BA Godleman 53 (134); RAJ Smith 3/23 (11 overs)	Queen's Park, Chesterfield; Umpires: Paul Baldwin and Martin Saggers
Scorecard			281/3d (90.4 overs) (f/o); HD Rutherford 108 (265); AG Salter 2/51 (25 overs)	Queen's Park, Chesterfield; Umpires: Paul Baldwin and Martin Saggers
Derbyshire won the toss and elected to field; Points: Glamorgan 13, Derbyshire 10

6–9 July	(H) Lancashire	v	Essex	Match drawn
Scorecard	402/8d (100.2 overs); SJ Croft 122 (240); RJW Topley 3/90 (24 overs)		203 (71 overs); NLJ Browne 105 (213); JP Faulkner 5/39 (17 overs)	Old Trafford, Manchester; Umpires: Richard Kettleborough and David Millns
Scorecard			168/3 (59 overs); NLJ Browne 50 (78); AM Lilley 3/63 (24 overs)	Old Trafford, Manchester; Umpires: Richard Kettleborough and David Millns
Lancashire won the toss and elected to bat; Points: Lancashire 13, Essex 8

8–11 July	Northamptonshire	v	(H) Gloucestershire	Gloucestershire won by 9 wickets
Scorecard	246 (69.3 overs); AG Wakely 104 (222); LC Norwell 6/41 (13.3 overs)		372 (75.5 overs); JMR Taylor 156 (125); OP Stone 4/91 (22)	College Ground, Cheltenham; Umpires: Jeff Evans and Paul Pollard
Scorecard	160 (37.1 overs); RE Levi 64 (78); CN Miles 5/28 (10.1 overs)		38/1 (6 overs); WA Tavare 12* (21); OP Stone 1/18 (3 overs)	College Ground, Cheltenham; Umpires: Jeff Evans and Paul Pollard
Gloucestershire won the toss and elected to field; Points: Gloucestershire 23, Northamptonshire 4

12–15 July	(H) Essex	v	Glamorgan	Essex won by 248 runs
Scorecard	279 (78.3 overs); JC Mickleburgh 50 (86); MG Hogan 4/36 (19.3 overs)		162 (40.5 overs); CA Ingram 43 (56); JD Ryder 6/47 (15 overs)	County Ground, Chelmsford; Umpires: Peter Hartley and CK Nandan
Scorecard	344/4d (85 overs); NLJ Browne 129 (209); CA Ingram 3/90 (17 overs)		213 (60.3 overs); AHT Donald 67 (121); JD Ryder 4/53 (17.3)	County Ground, Chelmsford; Umpires: Peter Hartley and CK Nandan
Essex won the toss and elected to bat; Points: Essex 21, Glamorgan 3

13–16 July	(H) Surrey	v	Kent	Surrey won by 6 wickets
Scorecard	336 (92.2 overs); SW Billings 99 (142); SM Curran 5/101 (22.2)		311 (82.3 overs); KC Sangakkara 110 (183); DI Stevens 4/76 (28 overs)	The Oval, London; Umpires: Ben Debenham and Steve Garratt
Scorecard	99 (41.1 overs); SA Northeast 33 (64); GJ Batty 4/12 (8.1 overs)		128/4 (38.1 overs); BT Foakes 57* 93; JC Tredwell 3/61 (17.1)	The Oval, London; Umpires: Ben Debenham and Steve Garratt
Surrey won the toss and elected to field; Sam Curran (Surrey) made his first-class debut; Points: Surrey 22, Kent 6

15–18 July	(H) Gloucestershire	v	Leicestershire	Gloucestershire won by 155 runs
Scorecard	218 (72.2 overs); GH Roderick 61 (149); CJ McKay 5/59 (21.2 overs)		215 (87.2 overs); MJ Cosgrove 74 (155); JK Fuller 4/35 (15.2 overs)	College Ground, Cheltenham; Umpires: Jeremy Lloyds and Martin Saggers
Scorecard	321 (112.4 overs); BAC Howell 102 (203); CE Shreck 5/82 (34 overs)		169 (65.2 overs); AM Ali 41 (93); CN Miles 3/27 (15 overs)	College Ground, Cheltenham; Umpires: Jeremy Lloyds and Martin Saggers
Leicestershire won the toss and elected to field; Points: Gloucestershire 20, Leicestershire 4

18–21 July	Derbyshire	v	(H) Northamptonshire	Derbyshire won by 7 wickets
Scorecard	361 (91.4 overs); AL Hughes 111* (146); RK Kleinveldt 4/99 (21 overs)		116 (38.1 overs); RE Levi 34 (44); MHA Footitt 5/41 (12 overs)	County Ground, Northampton; Umpires: Peter Hartley and Graham Lloyd
Scorecard	72/3 (14.2 overs); BA Godleman 14 (35); BW Sanderson 1/7 (2 overs)		316 (80.3 overs) (f/o); BM Duckett 154 (215); WJ Durston 3/55 (10 overs)	County Ground, Northampton; Umpires: Peter Hartley and Graham Lloyd
Derbyshire won the toss and elected to bat; Points: Derbyshire 23, Northamptonshire 3

19–22 July	Lancashire	v	(H) Glamorgan	Lancashire won by an innings and 157 runs
Scorecard	698/5d (136.4 overs); AN Petersen 286 (376); DL Lloyd 3/164 (23 overs)		348 (101.2 overs); MG Hogan 57 (44); G Chapple 4/62 (24 overs)	Penrhyn Avenue, Rhos-on-Sea, Colwyn Bay; Umpires: Martin Bodenham and Neil Mallender
Scorecard			193 (71.4 overs); CB Cooke 56 (164); SC Kerrigan 4/28 (21.4 overs)	Penrhyn Avenue, Rhos-on-Sea, Colwyn Bay; Umpires: Martin Bodenham and Neil Mallender
Lancashire won the toss and elected to bat; Points: Lancashire 24, Glamorgan 3

19–22 July	Essex	v	(H) Kent	Kent won by an innings and 207 runs
Scorecard	260 (81.5 overs); T Westley 77 (114); DI Stevens 4/37 (23.5 overs)		633/8d (143.5 overs); BW Harmison 123 (212); RS Bopara 3/89 (20 overs)	Nevill Ground, Tunbridge Wells; Umpires: Mike Burns and Jeff Evans
Scorecard	166 (44.1 overs); GR Napier 35* (45); CJ Haggett 4/43 (13.1 overs)			Nevill Ground, Tunbridge Wells; Umpires: Mike Burns and Jeff Evans
Essex won the toss and elected to bat; Points: Kent 24, Essex 3

==== August ====
4–7 August	(H) Kent	v	Northamptonshire	Northamptonshire won by an innings and 23 runs
Scorecard	167 (51.2 overs); JL Denly 50 (73); OP Stone 4/59 (16.2 overs)		398 (107.4 overs); BM Duckett 145 (199); JC Tredwell 3/59 (31.4 overs)	St Lawrence Ground, Canterbury; Umpires: Russell Evans and Steve O'Shaughnessy
Scorecard	208 (78 overs); SW Billings 43 (75); BW Sanderson 4/44 (12 overs)			St Lawrence Ground, Canterbury; Umpires: Russell Evans and Steve O'Shaughnessy
Kent won the toss and elected to bat; Saif Zaib (Northamptonshire) made his first-class debut.; Points: Northamptonshire 23, Kent 3

6–9 August	(H) Glamorgan	v	Gloucestershire	Gloucestershire won by 7 wickets
Scorecard	299 (102.4 overs); AG Salter 73 (138); DA Payne 4/73 (19.4 overs)		416 (117.1 overs); HJH Marshall 70 (106); CAJ Meschede 4/89 (25 overs)	St Helen's, Swansea; Umpires: Neil Bainton and David Millns
Scorecard	224 (62.5 overs); CA Ingram 45 (73); DA Payne 4/50 (15 overs)		108 (36.5 overs); CDJ Dent 65* (119); GG Wagg 2/8 (6 overs)	St Helen's, Swansea; Umpires: Neil Bainton and David Millns
Glamorgan won the toss and elected to bat; Points: Gloucestershire 23, Glamorgan 4

7–10 August	(H) Essex	v	Surrey	Surrey won by 3 wickets
Scorecard	369 (107.1 overs); ML Pettini 134 (200); ZS Ansari 5/108 (32 overs)		346 (98.1 overs); RJ Burns 158 (246); JA Porter 4/96 (26.1 overs)	Castle Park Cricket Ground, Colchester; Umpires: Jeff Evans and Peter Hartley
Scorecard	289/9d (79 overs); T Westley 90 (172); GJ Batty 5/102 (34 overs)		313/7 (79.1 overs); A Harinath 87 (159); T Westley 4/75 (25 overs)	Castle Park Cricket Ground, Colchester; Umpires: Jeff Evans and Peter Hartley
Essex won the toss and elected to bat; Points: Surrey 22, Essex 7

7–10 August	Derbyshire	v	Leicestershire	Leicestershire won by 3 wickets
Scorecard	345 (103 overs); WL Madsen 172* (292); CE Shreck 4/84 (25 overs)		314 (90.2 overs); MJ Cosgrove 102 (115); MHA Footitt 5/53 (22.2 overs)	Grace Road, Leicester; Umpires: Paul Baldwin and Graham Lloyd
Scorecard	241 (66.3 overs); BA Godleman 101 (166); CJ McKay 4/39 (14.5 overs)		273/7 (88.2 overs); NJ O'Brien 87 (128); AP Palladino 3/32 (17 overs)	Grace Road, Leicester; Umpires: Paul Baldwin and Graham Lloyd
Leicestershire won the toss and elected to field; Rob Sayer (Leicestershire) made his first-class debut.; Points: Leicestershire 22, Derbyshire 6

21–24 August	(H) Derbyshire	v	Kent	Match drawn
Scorecard	253 (83 overs); BA Godleman 108 (161); MD Hunn 3/45 (21 overs)		159 (57.5 overs); RWT Key 29 (51); MHA Footitt 4/61 (19.5 overs)	County Ground, Derby; Umpires: Paul Baldwin and Jeremy Lloyds
Scorecard	234/3d (67 overs); BA Godleman 105* (186); IAA Thomas 2/68 (17 overs)		231/5 (66.5 overs); SA Northeast 76 (155); MHA Footitt 2/64 (24 overs)	County Ground, Derby; Umpires: Paul Baldwin and Jeremy Lloyds
Kent won the toss and elected to field; Points: Derbyshire 10, Kent 8

21–24 August	(H) Gloucestershire	v	Surrey	Match drawn
Scorecard	233 (71.2 overs); GH Roderick 71 (100); TK Curran 6/61 (25 overs)		349/6 (98.2 overs); BT Foakes 140* (212); K Noema-Barnett 2/35 (15 overs)	County Ground, Bristol; Umpires: Russell Evans and Graham Lloyd
Surrey won the toss and elected to field; Points: Surrey 11, Gloucestershire 8

21–24 August	(H) Lancashire	v	Glamorgan	Match drawn
Scorecard	462 (140.1 overs); KR Brown 132 (292); CAJ Meschede 4/101 (24 overs)		213 (79.4 overs); AG Salter 45 (105); SC Kerrigan 4/60 (24.4 overs)	Old Trafford, Manchester; Umpires: Rob Bailey and Richard Illingworth
Scorecard			159/3 (82 overs) (f/o); JA Rudolph 63 (206); SJ Croft 1/3 (6 overs)	Old Trafford, Manchester; Umpires: Rob Bailey and Richard Illingworth
Lancashire won the toss and elected to bat; Haseeb Hameed (Lancashire) made his first-class debut.; Points: Lancashire 11, Glamorgan 7

21–24 August	(H) Northamptonshire	v	Leicestershire	Match drawn
Scorecard	325 (78.2 overs); AG Wakely 123 (186); CJ McKay 5/54 (19.2 overs)		372 (110.2 overs); MJ Cosgrove 110 (194); RK Kleinveldt 5/68 (25 overs)	County Ground, Northampton; Umpires: Mike Burns and Alex Wharf
Scorecard	162 (67.2 overs); RE Levi 54* (124); WA White 5/51 (22 overs)		30/1 (6.4 overs); LJ Hill 11* (21); RK Kleinveldt 1/14 (3.4 overs)	County Ground, Northampton; Umpires: Mike Burns and Alex Wharf
Leicestershire won the toss and elected to field; Points: Leicestershire 12, Northamptonshire 11

==== September ====
1–4 September	(H) Essex	v	Northamptonshire	Match drawn
Scorecard	360 (113.1 overs); JS Foster 98 (172); Azharullah 4/74 (30.1 overs)		275 (69.1 overs); RK Kleinveldt 52 (57); JD Ryder 3/53 (18.1 overs)	County Ground, Chelmsford; Umpires: Martin Bodenham and Martin Saggers
Scorecard	216/5d (63 overs); RN ten Doeschate 43 (72); MA Chambers 2/47 (16 overs)		92/4 (27 overs); BM Duckett 34* (69); JA Porter 2/27 (11 overs)	County Ground, Chelmsford; Umpires: Martin Bodenham and Martin Saggers
Northamptonshire won the toss and chose to field; Points: Essex 12, Northamptonshire 9

1–4 September	(H) Kent	v	Lancashire	Match drawn
Scorecard	570/8d (147 overs); SA Northeast 139 (221); J Clark 3/87 (30 overs)		259 (87.1 overs); SJ Croft 85 (170); MT Coles 3/75 (22.1 overs)	St. Lawrence Ground, Canterbury; Umpires: Neil Bainton and Graham Lloyd
Scorecard			258/4 (102 overs) following on SJ Croft 72* (209); JC Tredwell 1/17 (20 overs)	St. Lawrence Ground, Canterbury; Umpires: Neil Bainton and Graham Lloyd
Lancashire won the toss and chose to field; Points: Kent 12, Lancashire 8

1–4 September	(H) Leicestershire	v	Gloucestershire	Match drawn
Scorecard	415 (119 overs); AM Ali 80 (152); LC Norwell 4/97 (30 overs)		269/8d (90.3 overs); CDJ Dent 73 (187); RML Taylor 3/41 (13 overs)	Grace Road, Leicester; Umpires: Nick Cook and Nigel Cowley
Scorecard	155/9d (31.3 overs); DJ Redfern 74 (83); LC Norwell 3/48 (10 overs)		212/5 (47.2 overs); CDJ Dent 52 (71); WA Tavaré 52 (111); BA Raine 2/22 (10 overs)	Grace Road, Leicester; Umpires: Nick Cook and Nigel Cowley
Gloucestershire won the toss and chose to field; Points: Leicestershire 11, Gloucestershire 9

1–4 September	(H) Surrey	v	Derbyshire	Surrey won by an innings & 98 runs
Scorecard	560 (158.3 overs); ZS Ansari 106 (230); WJ Durston 6/113 (42.3 overs)		313 (102.1 overs); CF Hughes 96 (190); TK Curran 5/71 (24.1 overs)	The Oval, London; Umpires: Mike Burns and Jeff Evans
Scorecard			149 (57.4 overs); WL Madsen 76* (154); GJ Batty 6/51 (16.4 overs)	The Oval, London; Umpires: Mike Burns and Jeff Evans
Derbyshire won the toss and chose to bat; Points: Surrey 23, Derbyshire 5

9–12 September	(H) Derbyshire	v	Essex	Essex won by an innings & 188 runs
Scorecard	94 (33 overs); BA Godleman 22 (51); JR Winslade 4/20 (4 overs)		464/7d (119.4 overs); ML Pettini 117 (173); MHA Footitt 3/110 (34 overs)	County Ground, Derby; Umpires: Jeremy Lloyds and Neil Mallender
Scorecard	182 (62.4 overs); CF Hughes 38 (79); WL Madsen 38 (96); RS Bopara 4/29 (12.4 overs)			County Ground, Derby; Umpires: Jeremy Lloyds and Neil Mallender
Derbyshire won the toss and chose to field; Jack Winslade (Essex) made his first-class debut; Points: Essex 24, Derbyshire 2

9–12 September	(H) Glamorgan	v	Kent	Kent won by 316 runs
Scorecard	207 (43.5 overs); GG Wagg 58 (59); AEN Riley 4/47 (7.5 overs)		309 (78.3 overs); RWT Key 94 (150); MG Hogan 4/51 (20 overs)	Sophia Gardens, Cardiff; Umpires: Martin Bodenham and Alex Wharf
Scorecard	237 (62.3 overs); CA Ingram 105* (179); DI Stevens 5/58 (22 overs)		451/2d (102 overs); JL Denly 161* (220); GG Wagg 1/89 (21 overs)	Sophia Gardens, Cardiff; Umpires: Martin Bodenham and Alex Wharf
Kent won the toss and chose to bat; Points: Kent 22, Glamorgan 4

14–17 September	(H) Kent	v	Gloucestershire	Match Drawn
Scorecard	67/1 (15 overs); SR Dickson 31* (49); DA Payne 1/22 (5 overs)			St. Lawrence Ground, Canterbury; Umpires: Paul Baldwin and David Millns
Gloucestershire won the toss and chose to field; No play on days 2, 3 and 4; Points: Kent 5, Gloucestershire 5

14–17 September	(H) Lancashire	v	Surrey	Match drawn
Scorecard	272 (71.3 overs); AG Prince 45 (78); SM Curran 5/67 (19 overs)		480 (138 overs); ZS Ansari 99 (255); SC Kerrigan 4/128 (43 overs)	Old Trafford, Manchester; Umpires: Jeff Evans and Russell Evans
Scorecard	195/7 (84.3 overs); H Hameed 91 (234); MP Dunn 3/46 (17 overs); TK Curran 3/46 (29.3 overs)		283/7d (54.1 overs); KC Sangakkara 118 (134); SC Croft 4/35 (7.1 overs)	Old Trafford, Manchester; Umpires: Jeff Evans and Russell Evans
Surrey won the toss and chose to bat; Points: Surrey 12, Lancashire 9

14–17 September	(H) Leicestershire	v	Essex	Essex won by 5 wickets
Scorecard	251/7d (69 overs); MJ Cosgrove 94 (163); JD Ryder 5/89 (25 overs)		18/0d (5 overs); DW Lawrence 14* (18)	Grace Road, Leicester; Umpires: Steve Garratt and Graham Lloyd
Scorecard	73/1d (14 overs); EJH Eckersely 30 (25); T Westley 1/11 (4 overs)		307/5 (59.5 overs); NLJ Browne 151* (184); WA White 2/69 (13.2 overs)	Grace Road, Leicester; Umpires: Steve Garratt and Graham Lloyd
Essex won the toss and chose to field; Points: Essex 18, Leicestershire 2

14–17 September	(H) Northamptonshire	v	Glamorgan	Match drawn
Scorecard	278 (64.4 overs); AM Rossington 59 (65); GG Wagg 4/77 (18.4 overs)		233 (52.2 overs); DL Lloyd 92 (106); RK Kleinveldt 5/83 (20 overs)	County Ground, Northampton; Umpires: Neil Bainton and Stephen Gale
Scorecard			99/3 (26 overs); AHT Donald 40* (50); RJ Gleeson 2/35 (7 overs)	County Ground, Northampton; Umpires: Neil Bainton and Stephen Gale
Northamptonshire won the toss and chose to field; Dewi Penrhyn Jones (Glamorgan) made his first-class debut; Points: Northamptonshire 10, Glamorgan 9

22–25 September	(H) Derbyshire	v	Leicestershire	Match drawn
Scorecard	352 (106.4 overs); WL Madsen 95 (154); OH Freckingham 4/91 (24 overs)		329 (80.1 overs); ZJ Chappell 96 (122); MHA Footitt 7/71 (20.1 overs)	County Ground, Derby; Umpires: Martin Bodenham and Neil Mallender
Scorecard	331/8 (81 overs); CF Hughes 101 (156); RML Taylor 2/68 (13 overs)		363 (87.1 overs); MJ Cosgrove 156 (203); WJ Durston 6/109 (26.1 overs)	County Ground, Derby; Umpires: Martin Bodenham and Neil Mallender
Derbyshire won the toss and chose to field; Zak Chappell (Leicestershire) made his first-class debut; Points: Derbyshire 12, Leicestershire 11

22–25 September	(H) Essex	v	Lancashire	Match drawn
Scorecard	394 (110.5 overs); JD Ryder 116 (138); JM Anderson 7/77 (31.5 overs)		310 (88.4 overs); LM Reece 82 (139); RS Bopara 3/40 (15.4 overs)	County Ground, Chelmsford; Umpires: Mike Burns and Nick Cook
Scorecard	138/3 (30 overs); RS Bopara 52* (65); JM Anderson 1/13 (6 overs)			County Ground, Chelmsford; Umpires: Mike Burns and Nick Cook
Lancashire won the toss and chose to field; Points: Essex 12, Lancashire 11

22–25 September	(H) Gloucestershire	v	Glamorgan	Match drawn
Scorecard	558 (121.5 overs); CDJ Dent 268 (347); MG Hogan 3/82 (29 overs)		433 (99.3 overs); AHT Donald 98 (135); JK Fuller 4/59 (21 overs)	County Ground, Bristol; Umpires: Paul Baldwin and Nigel Cowley
Scorecard			365/3 (102 overs); CB Cooke 102* (135); DA Payne 1/32 (16 overs)	County Ground, Bristol; Umpires: Paul Baldwin and Nigel Cowley
Glamorgan won the toss and chose to bat; Points: Gloucestershire 13, Glamorgan 12

22–25 September	(H) Surrey	v	Northamptonshire	Match drawn
Scorecard	410 (95.5 overs); KC Sangakkara 101 (140); MA Chambers 3/44 (10.3 overs)		110 (29.5 overs); JJ Cobb 29* (49); TK Curran 7/35 (13.5 overs)	The Oval, London; Umpires: Steve Garratt and Nigel Llong
Scorecard	125/5 (15.5 overs); JJ Roy 77 (35); GG White 2/25 (5.5 overs)		515 (115 overs); D Murphy 135* (155); MP Dunn 4/104 (23 overs)	The Oval, London; Umpires: Steve Garratt and Nigel Llong
Surrey won the toss and chose to bat; Points: Surrey 13, Northamptonshire 8

== Statistics ==
=== Division One ===
==== Most runs ====
Player	Team	Matches	Innings	Runs	Average	HS	100s	50s
James Hildreth	Somerset	16	27	1390	53.46	220*	3	8
Scott Borthwick	Durham	16	32	1286	42.86	103	1	11
Marcus Trescothick	Somerset	16	29	1284	45.85	210*	3	8
Luke Wright	Sussex	16	28	1210	46.53	226*	2	8
Michael Carberry	Hampshire	16	30	1129	38.93	97*	0	10

==== Most wickets ====
Player	Team	Matches	Overs	Wickets	Average	BBI	5W	10W
Chris Rushworth	Durham	16	585.4	83	20.61	6/39	7	0
Steve Magoffin	Sussex	16	582.0	69	24.05	6/50	4	1
James Harris	Middlesex	16	460.2	69	25.73	9/34	3	1
Jack Brooks	Yorkshire	14	420.5	65	22.76	5/35	3	0
Graham Onions	Durham	15	467.5	65	26.83	7/68	3	0

=== Division Two ===
==== Most runs ====
Player	Team	Matches	Innings	Runs	Average	HS	100s	50s
Ashwell Prince	Lancashire	16	23	1478	67.18	261	5	5
Sam Northeast	Kent	16	28	1168	46.72	139	1	9
Nick Browne	Essex	16	29	1157	42.85	151*	5	3
Mark Cosgrove	Leicestershire	15	28	1093	40.48	156	4	4
Billy Godleman	Derbyshire	14	28	1069	44.54	108	3	7

==== Most wickets ====
Player	Team	Matches	Overs	Wickets	Average	BBI	5W	10W
Tom Curran	Surrey	16	544.4	76	23.07	7/20	5	1
Mark Footitt	Derbyshire	16	537.4	76	23.63	7/71	5	1
Matt Coles	Kent	14	433.0	67	23.49	6/55	2	1
Kyle Jarvis	Lancashire	13	450.5	62	24.72	5/13	4	0
Darren Stevens	Kent	15	419.1	61	20.36	5/58	2	0

== See also ==
- 2015 Royal London One-Day Cup
- 2015 NatWest t20 Blast
