= Tom Fell =

English cricketer (born 1993)

Personal information
- Full name: Thomas Charles Fell
- Born: 17 October 1993 (age 33); Hillingdon, London, England
- Height: 6 ft 1 in (1.85 m)
- Batting: Right-handed
- Bowling: Right-arm off break
- Role: Batsman, occasional wicket-keeper

Domestic team information
- Years: Team
- 2013–2022: Worcestershire (squad no. 29)
- 2013: Oxford MCCU
- FC debut: 5 April 2013 Oxford MCCU v Warwickshire
- LA debut: 16 June 2013 Worcestershire v Netherlands

Career statistics
Competition	FC	LA	T20
Matches	97	52	9
Runs scored	4,485	1,541	69
Batting average	28.75	33.50	9.85
100s/50s	6/19	1/13	0/0
Top score	171	116*	28
Balls bowled	20	–	–
Wickets	0	–	–
Bowling average	–	–	–
5 wickets in innings	–	–	–
10 wickets in match	–	–	–
Best bowling	–	–	–
Catches/stumpings	75/–	18/–	2/–
- Source: ESPNcricinfo, 24 August 2022

Thomas Charles Fell (born 17 October 1993) is an English cricketer who plays for Worcestershire. He is a right-handed batsman and occasional wicket-keeper.

Tom Fell was educated at Oakham School, where he was the highest run scorer in the school's history. He went on to study at Oxford Brookes University, and played for Oxford MCCU. He left university after a year to focus on cricket.

After the end of the 2015 season, it was confirmed that Fell was suffering from testicular cancer, but after initially being cleared to play grade cricket in Australia, a scan subsequently detected the disease in his lymph nodes and Fell returned to home to undergo chemotherapy. After receiving the all-clear Fell returned to cricket in July 2016 with a half century against Leicestershire.

He made his Twenty20 debut for Worcestershire in the 2018 t20 Blast on 17 August 2018.
