= Arun Harinath =

English cricketer

Personal information
- Full name: Arun Harinath
- Born: 26 March 1987 (age 39); Sutton, London, England
- Nickname: The Baron
- Height: 5 ft 11 in (1.80 m)
- Batting: Left-handed
- Bowling: Right-arm off break
- Role: Batsman

Domestic team information
- Years: Team
- 2007–2009: Loughborough UCCE
- 2008: Marylebone Cricket Club (MCC)
- 2009–2019: Surrey (squad no. 10)
- 2017: → Leicestershire (on loan)
- 2019: → Hampshire (on loan)

Career statistics
Competition	FC	LA
Matches	75	7
Runs scored	3,870	108
Batting average	30.96	21.60
100s/50s	6/21	0/1
Top score	154	52
Balls bowled	351	18
Wickets	5	0
Bowling average	39.00	–
5 wickets in innings	0	–
10 wickets in match	0	n/a
Best bowling	2/1	–
Catches/stumpings	20/–	1/–
- Source: CricketArchive, 24 August 2018

Arun Harinath (born 26 March 1987) is a former English cricketer, a top-order batsman who played at first-class level for Surrey, Marylebone Cricket Club (MCC), Leicestershire and Loughborough UCCE between 2007 and 2018. He was educated at Tiffin School, and then attended Loughborough University. Born to Sri Lankan parents, he has a younger brother Muhunthan Harinath who played for Surrey Second XI.

Harinath was part of the Surrey setup from the age of nine, and by 2006 was a regular in the county's Second XI. Despite not having made a first-team appearance for Surrey, in October 2008 he was offered a new two-year contract.

He made his first-class debut for Loughborough in April 2007 and his Surrey debut against Gloucestershire in September 2009, playing the last 3 games of the season. He was a regular for the Championship team in 2010 and 2013, playing 12 Championship games in each season but only one game in 2011. He scored over 500 runs in 2010, 2013 and 2015 and scored a total of 6 centuries. During the 2017 season he spent a period on loan to Leicestershire. He rarely played limited-over cricket for Surrey. He played for Sutton Cricket Club in the Surrey Championship.

On 8 July 2019, he joined Hampshire on loan for the remainder of the 2019 season. However, he did not play in any first-class or List A matches during the 2019 season, or subsequently, for either Surrey or Hampshire. He retired from cricket for a career in finance in 2019.
