= Ryan Pringle =

English cricketer

Personal information
- Full name: Ryan David Pringle
- Born: 17 April 1992 (age 34); Sunderland, Tyne and Wear, England
- Batting: Right-handed
- Bowling: Right-arm off break
- Role: All-rounder

Domestic team information
- Years: Team
- 2012–2019: Durham (squad no. 17)
- FC debut: 19 May 2013 Durham v Somerset
- LA debut: 27 August 2012 Durham v Hampshire

Career statistics
Competition	FC	LA	T20
Matches	40	40	70
Runs scored	1,336	492	463
Batting average	24.29	15.87	10.76
100s/50s	0/8	1/0	0/0
Top score	99	125	33
Balls bowled	4,020	987	744
Wickets	63	14	29
Bowling average	38.11	65.64	36.58
5 wickets in innings	2	0	0
10 wickets in match	1	0	0
Best bowling	7/107	2/39	3/30
Catches/stumpings	24/–	12/–	24/–
- Source: CricketArchive, 21 July 2019

Ryan David Pringle (born 17 April 1992) is an English cricketer who most recently played for Durham County Cricket Club. He is a right-arm off break bowler who also bats right handed. He made his list A debut for the county in August 2012 against Hampshire.
