= Graham Napier =

English cricketer

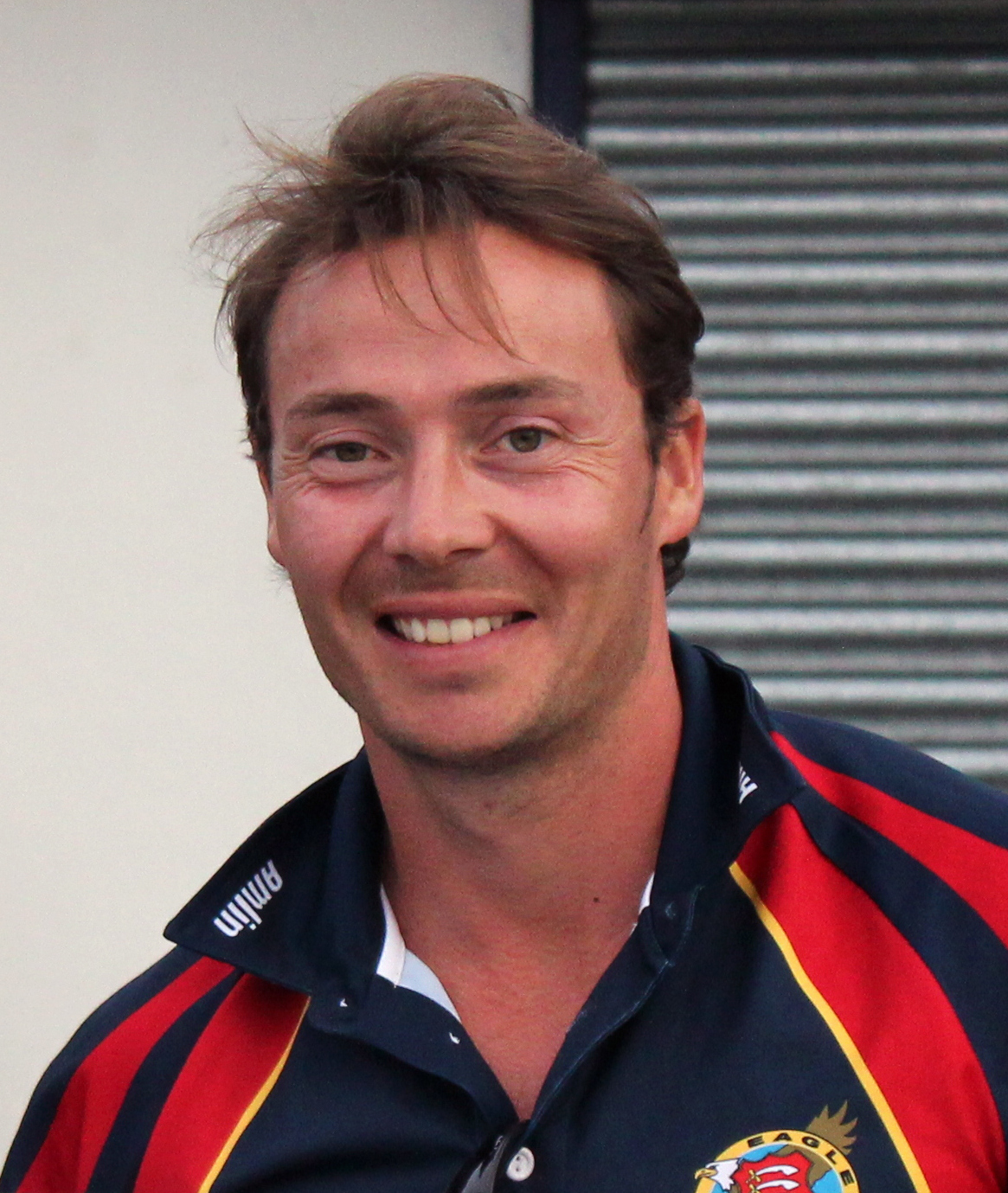

Personal information
- Full name: Graham Richard Napier
- Born: 6 January 1980 (age 46); Colchester, Essex, England
- Nickname: Napes, George
- Height: 5 ft 10 in (1.78 m)
- Batting: Right-handed
- Bowling: Right-arm medium
- Role: All-rounder

Domestic team information
- Years: Team
- 1997–2016: Essex (squad no. 17)
- 1999–2002: Essex Cricket Board
- 2007/08–2008/09: Wellington
- 2009: Mumbai Indians
- 2009/10–2011/12: Central Districts
- 2013/14: Wellington
- FC debut: 7 May 1997 Essex v Cambridge University
- Last FC: 12 September 2016 Essex v Glamorgan
- LA debut: 10 August 1997 Essex v Kent
- Last LA: 17 August 2016 Essex v Warwickshire

Career statistics
Competition	FC	LA	T20
Matches	179	246	137
Runs scored	5,739	2,971	1,206
Batting average	29.28	18.33	15.66
100s/50s	7/31	0/14	1/0
Top score	196	79	152*
Balls bowled	25,213	8,762	2,905
Wickets	490	299	164
Bowling average	30.12	25.93	23.35
5 wickets in innings	17	4	0
10 wickets in match	0	0	0
Best bowling	7/21	7/32	4/10
Catches/stumpings	63/–	58/–	43/–
- Source: CricketArchive, 15 September 2016

Graham Richard Napier (born 6 January 1980) is an English former cricketer. He was a right-handed batsman and a right-arm medium pace bowler. Napier played first-class cricket for his home county of Essex since the outset of his senior career in 1997. Between 1997 and 1999 Napier played in four Youth Test matches in England against Zimbabwe, South Africa (twice) and Australia's respective under-19 teams. He was also a member of the 1998 Under-19 Cricket World Cup winning squad. Napier was on the books of Ipswich Town as a goalkeeper and played for a season on loan at Felixstowe Town. He retired at the end of the 2016 season.

== Playing style ==
Born in Colchester, Essex, Napier was a medium pace bowler, who was capable of reaching speeds between 85 mph-90 mph. Napier has displayed a slower ball in Twenty20 games which proved hard to spot. As a batsman, Napier twice hit 16 sixes in an innings, once in a Twenty20 match, and once in a County Championship match.

== Twenty20 and 40 over ==
In a Twenty20 cup match against Sussex on 24 June 2008, Napier scored 152 not out from 58 balls. The innings set a number of records, notably the highest individual score in a T20 innings in England, and in the domestic Twenty20 competition; the highest number of sixes in an individual Twenty20 innings (16); the most runs scored in boundaries in an individual Twenty20 innings (136 runs, scored as 10 fours, and 16 sixes). It also broke the record for most sixes in a domestic one-day innings, and tied the record for most sixes in any domestic innings, tying the record set by Andrew Symonds, during a County Championship game in 1995.

Graham Napier has the record for the highest ever T20 score when batting at number 3 position.(152*). Also he's in second in the list for scoring the most number of boundaries in a T20 innings.(26 boundaries-10 fours and 16 sixes) and also second in the list for hitting the most number of sixes in a T20 innings.

He was signed by the Mumbai Indians for the 2009 IPL Season for an undisclosed amount.

In March 2009, Napier was called up to the England Lions squad for the first time since 2004. Geoff Miller, one of the selectors, said "the selectors felt this was a good opportunity for us to have a closer look at him within the England set-up". On 1 May 2009, Napier was confirmed as a member of the 15-man England squad for the 2009 Twenty20 World Cup on the same day as he made his first appearance for the Mumbai Indians.

On 3 June 2013, Napier finished a YB40 match with figures of 7 wickets for 32 runs, including 3 maidens, taking 4 wickets in 4 balls as Essex beat Surrey by 178 runs.

== First-class ==
On 19 May 2011, Napier equalled the record for most sixes scored in a first-class innings. He hit 16 sixes as part of a 130-ball 196 for Essex. It was his first first-class innings for 11 months, after being sidelined with a back injury. He hit 103 runs from the last 29 balls of his innings. After his innings, Napier told BBC Essex that he considers himself as mainly a bowler. On 22 June 2013, Napier took career best bowling figures of 7 wickets for 90 runs against Leicestershire.
