= Jack Winslade =

English cricketer (born 1995)

Personal information
- Full name: Jack Robert Winslade
- Born: 12 April 1995 (age 31); Epsom, Surrey, England
- Height: 5 ft 10 in (1.78 m)
- Batting: Right-handed
- Bowling: Right-arm medium-fast
- Role: All-rounder

Domestic team information
- Years: Team
- 2014: Surrey (squad no. 77)
- 2015: Essex
- First-class debut: 9 September 2015 Essex v Derbyshire
- Only List A: 14 August 2014 Surrey v Durham

Career statistics
Competition	FC	LA
Matches	2	1
Runs scored	–	–
Batting average	–	–
100s/50s	–/–	–/–
Top score	–	–
Balls bowled	126	39
Wickets	4	1
Bowling average	24.25	61.00
5 wickets in innings	0	0
10 wickets in match	0	n/a
Best bowling	4/20	1/61
Catches/stumpings	0/–	0/–
- Source: CricketArchive, 21 April 2016

Jack Robert Winslade (born 12 April 1995) is an English cricketer who played for Surrey. He is an all-rounder who bats right-handed and bowls right-arm medium-fast. He made his debut for the county in the 2014 Royal London One-Day Cup against Durham.

Winslade was released by Surrey at the end of the 2014 season. He joined Essex and made his first-class debut against Derbyshire on 9 September 2015.
