= Charlie Morris (cricketer, born 1992) =

English cricketer

Personal information
- Full name: Charles Andrew John Morris
- Born: 6 July 1992 (age 34); Hereford, Herefordshire, England
- Height: 6 ft 0 in (1.83 m)
- Batting: Right-handed
- Bowling: Right-arm medium-fast

Domestic team information
- Years: Team
- 2011–2012: Devon
- 2012–2014: Oxford MCCU
- 2013–2023: Worcestershire (squad no. 31)
- FC debut: 31 March 2012 Oxford MCCU v Glamorgan
- LA debut: 11 August 2013 Worcestershire v Kent

Career statistics
Competition	FC	LA	T20
Matches	77	41	32
Runs scored	642	110	21
Batting average	12.58	15.71	10.50
100s/50s	0/2	0/0	0/0
Top score	53*	25*	7*
Balls bowled	13,507	1,661	594
Wickets	237	44	32
Bowling average	29.71	37.38	29.59
5 wickets in innings	7	0	0
10 wickets in match	0	0	0
Best bowling	7/45	4/33	3/21
Catches/stumpings	15/–	9/–	10/–
- Source: ESPNcricinfo, 24 August 2022

Charles Andrew John Morris (born 6 July 1992) is an English former cricketer who played for Worcestershire. He has appeared in seventy seven first-class forty one List A and thirty two T20 Matches as a righthanded batsman who bowled right arm medium fast. He took 56 First Class wickets in his first full season with Worcestershire and helped them gain promotion to Division 1 Cricket. He has successfully secured 313 wickets over his career to date
