= Azharullah =

English Pakistani cricketer (born 1983)

Mohammad Azharullah
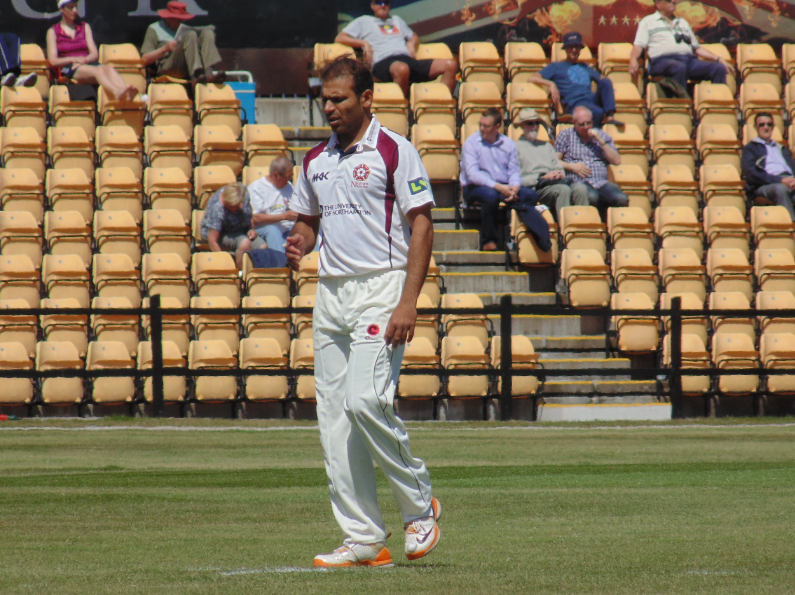

Personal information
- Full name: Mohammad Azharullah
- Born: 25 December 1983 (age 42); Burewala, Punjab, Pakistan
- Batting: Right-handed
- Bowling: Right-arm fast-medium
- Role: Bowler

Domestic team information
- Years: Team
- 2004–2007: Multan
- 2004–2013: WAPDA
- 2005–2009: Multan Tigers
- 2005: Quetta
- 2006: Quetta Bears
- 2008: Baluchistan
- 2013–2017: Northamptonshire (squad no. 92)
- 2019: Northamptonshire (squad no. 92)
- FC debut: 15 December 2004 Multan v Karachi Whites
- LA debut: 3 April 2005 WAPDA v Pakistan Telecommunication

Career statistics
Competition	FC	LA	T20
Matches	115	71	64
Runs scored	1,000	95	24
Batting average	12.82	6.33	24.00
100s/50s	0/1	0/0	0/0
Top score	58*	9	6*
Balls bowled	18,870	3,137	1,254
Wickets	383	96	71
Bowling average	28.05	30.92	24.83
5 wickets in innings	20	3	0
10 wickets in match	3	0	0
Best bowling	7/74	5/38	4/14
Catches/stumpings	26/–	13/–	10/–
- Source: CricketArchive, 30 September 2019

Mohammad Azharullah (born 25 December 1983) is an English Pakistani cricketer, who most recently played in England for Northamptonshire. Azharullah is a right-arm fast-medium bowler who also bats right-handed.

== Career in Pakistan ==
Azharullah made his first-class cricket debut for Multan in December 2004 against Karachi Whites.

He played 49 first-class matches in Pakistan between the 2004–05 and 2009–10 seasons, together with another four in the 2012–13 season, for Baluchistan, Multan, Punjab, Quetta and Water and Power Development Authority (WAPDA). During this time he took 190 first-class wickets at an average of 26.62. His most prolific season was 2007–08, when he took 52 wickets for WAPDA and Baluchistan.

== Northants career ==
In 2009 Azharullah married an English woman and played league cricket in Yorkshire with the intention of later playing county cricket.

Azharullah signed for Northants for the 2013 season and he made an immediate impact, especially in the Twenty20 competition. He took the most wickets in the competition that year, with 27 at 12.62 and played in the final, against Surrey He has continued to be a regular in the Northants team in all three forms of the game and his initial one-year contract was renewed once, and further extended to last until 2017. He has returned twice to Twenty20 finals day, Northants finishing runners-up in 2015, and beating Durham in the 2016 final.
