= Andrew Gale =

English cricketer and coach

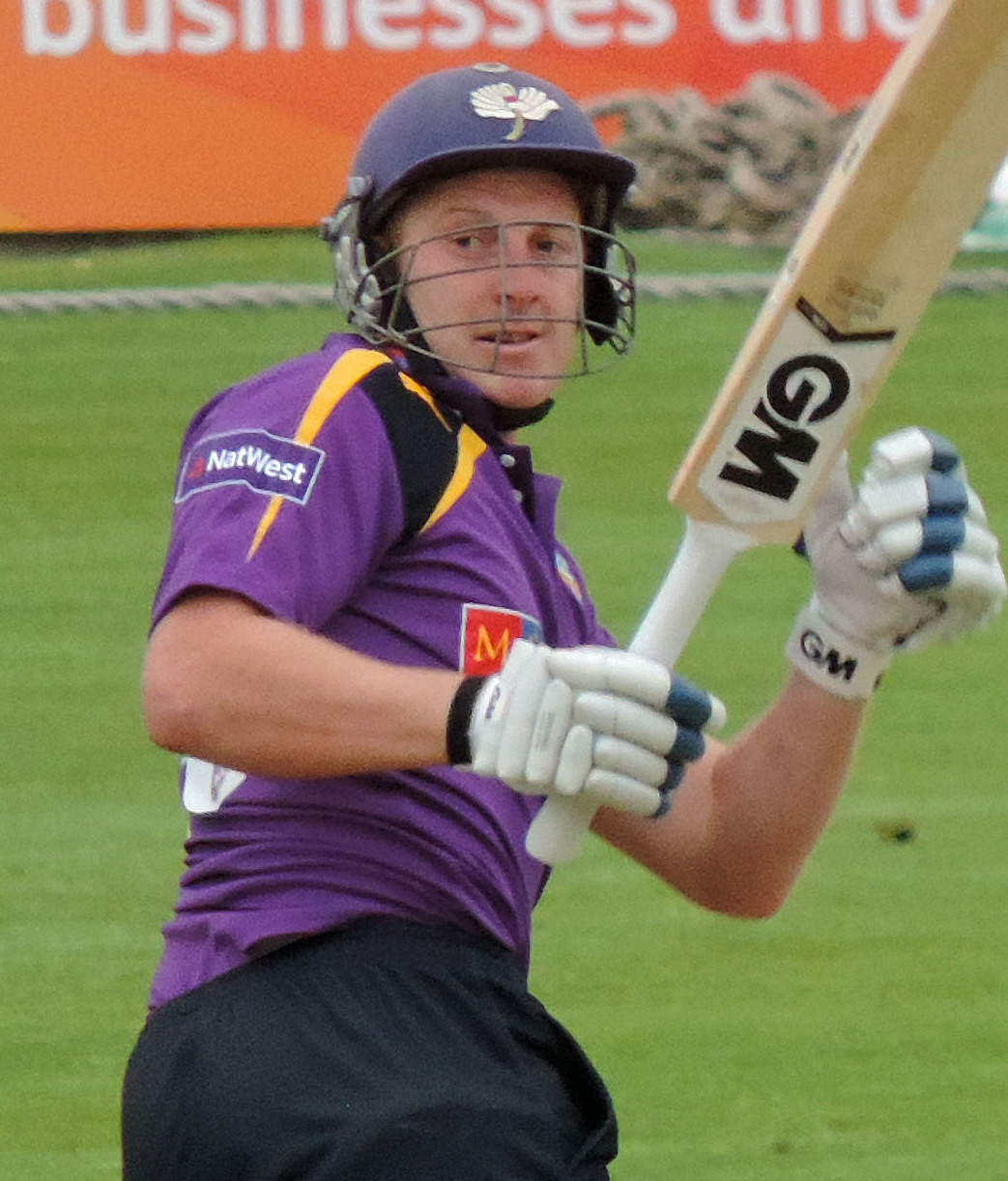
- Gale in 2014

Personal information
- Full name: Andrew William Gale
- Born: 28 November 1983 (age 42); Dewsbury, West Yorkshire, England
- Nickname: Galey, G
- Height: 6 ft 2 in (1.88 m)
- Batting: Left-handed
- Bowling: Right-arm leg break
- Role: Batsman

Domestic team information
- Years: Team
- 2001–2016: Yorkshire (squad no. 26)
- FC debut: 21 July 2004 Yorkshire v Somerset
- LA debut: 13 September 2001 Yorkshire v Gloucestershire

Head coaching information
- Years: Team
- 2016–2021: Yorkshire

Career statistics
| Competition | FC | LA | T20 |
|---|---|---|---|
| Matches | 156 | 135 | 108 |
| Runs scored | 8,217 | 3468 | 2302 |
| Batting average | 36.03 | 30.42 | 25.57 |
| 100s/50s | 20/31 | 2/18 | 0/16 |
| Top score | 272 | 125* | 91 |
| Balls bowled | 115 | – | – |
| Wickets | 1 | – | – |
| Bowling average | 238.00 | – | – |
| 5 wickets in innings | 0 | – | – |
| 10 wickets in match | 0 | – | – |
| Best bowling | 1/33 | – | – |
| Catches/stumpings | 50/– | 27/– | 32/– |
- Source: ESPN Cricinfo, 14 November 2016

Andrew William Gale (born 28 November 1983) is an English cricket coach and former first-class cricketer, who was first XI coach of Yorkshire County Cricket Club from 2016 to 2021. He also co-owns Pro Coach Cricket Academy, with his business partner Chris Brice, providing cricket coaching by professional cricketers.

== Life and career ==
Born in Dewsbury, West Yorkshire, Gale first played cricket for Gomersal Cricket Club when he was eight years old. He also played in the Yorkshire Central League. He later moved to Cleckheaton Cricket Club, hoping initially to become a footballer, before joining Driffield in the Yorkshire League. He played for England Youth teams from U15 to U19 level, and made his first-class debut as a left-handed batsman for Yorkshire in 2004. In nine first-class matches, up to the end of 2006, he scored 297 runs, with a best of 149 against Warwickshire in 2006, at an average of 18.56.

He became a more regular member of Yorkshire's one-day and Twenty20 teams, and played six one day internationals for England's Under 19s, captaining that team. In November 2007, he signed a new three-year contract with Yorkshire. In December 2009, Anthony McGrath resigned from his post as Yorkshire captain, with Gale being named as his replacement. He became the youngest captain of the county in the post-war era. In January 2014 Gale extended his contract with Yorkshire until 2016. In 2014 he became the first Yorkshire captain to lift the LV County Championship for 13 years, and he won it again as captain the following year. Gale received a two-match ban in 2014 after accusations were made of him verbally abusing Lancashire batsman Ashwell Prince in September. The England and Wales Cricket Board (ECB) referred the matter to the Cricket Discipline Commission (CDC), which imposed another suspension and ordered Gale to attend an anger management course. Prince accepted that he had been involved in time-wasting and whilst he didn't like Gale's tone and the way Gale spoke to him, did not detect any racism from Gale, making a point that it was the umpires who made the report, not himself.

At the end of the 2016 season, Gale retired from first-class cricket and became Yorkshire's first XI coach.

== Yorkshire County Cricket Club racism scandal ==
In November 2021, he was suspended as Yorkshire head coach because of a racist slur tweeted in 2010. He was sacked by the club in December 2021 along with the Director of cricket and all other members of the coaching staff.

== Personal life ==
His brother-in-law is former Yorkshire and now Warwickshire cricketer Tim Bresnan.
