= William Tavaré =

English cricketer

Will Tavaré
Personal information
- Full name: William Andrew Tavaré
- Born: 1 January 1990 (age 36); Bristol, England
- Height: 6 ft 0 in (1.83 m)
- Batting: Right-handed
- Bowling: Right-arm medium
- Relatives: Chris Tavaré (uncle)

Domestic team information
- Years: Team
- 2010–2012: Loughborough MCCU
- 2014–2019: Gloucestershire
- 2014: Tamil Union
- FC debut: 10 April 2010 Loughborough MCCU v Kent
- LA debut: 31 July 2014 Gloucestershire v Hampshire

Career statistics
Competition	FC	LA
Matches	54	8
Runs scored	2,721	221
Batting average	31.63	27.62
100s/50s	6/14	0/2
Top score	139	77
Balls bowled	102	–
Wickets	0	–
Bowling average	–	–
5 wickets in innings	–	–
10 wickets in match	–	n/a
Best bowling	–	–
Catches/stumpings	36/–	1/–
- Source: CricketArchive, 29 September 2017

William Andrew Tavaré (born 1 January 1990) is an English former cricketer who played for Gloucestershire County Cricket Club. Tavaré is a right-handed batsman who bowls right-arm medium pace. He was born in Bristol and educated at Bristol Grammar School. He retired from cricket following the 2019 County Championship.

While studying for his degree in human biology at Loughborough University, Tavaré made his first-class debut for Loughborough MCCU against Kent in 2010. He has made two further first-class appearances for Loughborough MCCU, against Yorkshire in 2010 and Kent in 2011.

On 28 September 2013, Tavaré signed for Gloucestershire County Cricket Club after impressing for the county's second XI during the 2013 season.

He is the nephew of both former England cricketer Chris Tavaré and business executive Simon Lee.
