= Aadil Ali =

English cricketer (born 1994)

Personal information
- Full name: Aadil Masud Ali
- Born: 29 December 1994 (age 31); Leicester, Leicestershire, England
- Batting: Right-handed
- Bowling: Right-arm off break
- Role: Batsman

Domestic team information
- Years: Team
- 2015–2019: Leicestershire (squad no. 14)
- FC debut: 5 July 2015 Leicestershire v Kent
- LA debut: 6 June 2015 Leicestershire v New Zealanders

Career statistics
Competition	FC	LA	T20
Matches	15	17	24
Runs scored	639	339	206
Batting average	26.62	22.60	13.73
100s/50s	0/3	0/3	0/0
Top score	80	88	35*
Balls bowled	78	132	72
Wickets	1	2	4
Bowling average	86.00	78.00	23.25
5 wickets in innings	0	0	0
10 wickets in match	0	0	0
Best bowling	1/10	1/31	2/22
Catches/stumpings	6/–	9/–	5/–
- Source: CricketArchive, 30 September 2019

Aadil Masud Ali (born 29 December 1994) is an English cricketer who played for Leicestershire County Cricket Club. He is a right-handed batsman who bowls right-arm off spin. He made his list A debut for Leicestershire against the touring New Zealanders in June 2015.
