= Warwickshire County Cricket Club in 2015 =

Warwickshire County Cricket Club
2015 season
- Coach: (Scotland) Dougie Brown
- Captain: (England) Varun Chopra
- Overseas players: (New Zealand) Jeetan Patel (New Zealand) Brendon McCullum (t20)

The 2015 season is the 134th year in the history of Warwickshire County Cricket Club and their 121st as a first-class county. In 2015, Warwickshire are competing in the first division of the County Championship, Group B of the Royal London One-Day Cup and the North Division of the NatWest t20 Blast. In the NatWest t20 Blast, the club are competing under the name "Birmingham Bears" for the second time.

On 1 July a new county record was set for a sixth wicket partnership when Laurie Evans and Tim Ambrose added 327 against Sussex in the County Championship at Birmingham.

== Squad ==
Name	Nationality	Birth date	Batting style	Bowling style	Ref
Batsmen
Ian Bell	England	11 April 1982 (aged 33)	Right-handed	Right arm medium	
Varun Chopra	Scotland	15 December 1991 (aged 23)	Right-handed	Right arm off break	
Freddie Coleman	England	21 June 1987 (aged 27)	Right-handed	Right arm off break	
Laurie Evans	England	12 October 1987 (aged 27)	Right-handed	Right arm medium-fast	
Sam Hain	England	16 July 1995 (aged 19)	Right-handed	Right arm off break	
Ateeq Javid	England	15 October 1991 (aged 23)	Right-handed	Right arm medium, off break	
William Porterfield	Ireland	6 September 1984 (aged 30)	Left-handed	Right arm off break	
Jonathan Trott	England	22 April 1981 (aged 33)	Right-handed	Right arm medium	
Jonathon Webb	England	12 January 1992 (aged 23)	Right-handed	Right arm medium	
Ian Westwood	England	13 July 1982 (aged 32)	Left-handed	Right arm off break	
All-rounders
Keith Barker	England	21 October 1986 (aged 28)	Left-handed	Left arm medium	
Rikki Clarke	England	29 September 1981 (aged 33)	Right-handed	Right arm fast-medium	
Chris Woakes	England	2 March 1989 (aged 26)	Right-handed	Right arm medium-fast	
Wicket-keepers
Tim Ambrose	England	1 December 1982 (aged 32)	Right-handed	—	
Peter McKay	England	12 October 1994 (aged 20)	Left-handed	—	
Bowlers
Recordo Gordon	England	12 October 1991 (aged 23)	Right-handed	Right arm fast-medium	
Oliver Hannon-Dalby	England	20 June 1989 (aged 25)	Left-handed	Right arm medium-fast	
Richard Jones	England	6 November 1986 (aged 28)	Right-handed	Right arm medium-fast	
Jeetan Patel	New Zealand	7 May 1980 (aged 34)	Right-handed	Right arm off break	
Boyd Rankin	England	5 July 1984 (aged 30)	Left-handed	Right arm medium-fast	
Chris Wright	England	14 July 1985 (aged 29)	Right-handed	Right arm fast-medium	

== County Championship ==
=== Division One Table ===
Team	Pld	W	L	T	D	A	Bat	Bowl	Ded	Pts
Yorkshire (C)	16	11	1	0	4	0	45	45	0	286
Middlesex	16	7	2	0	7	0	29	43	1	218
Nottinghamshire	16	6	5	0	5	0	45	45	0	211
Durham	16	7	8	0	1	0	26	45	0	188
Warwickshire	16	5	5	0	6	0	31	45	0	186
Somerset	16	4	6	0	6	0	46	43	0	183
Hampshire	16	4	6	0	6	0	31	38	0	163
Sussex (R)	16	4	8	0	4	0	36	41	0	161
Worcestershire (R)	16	3	10	0	3	0	44	44	0	151

=== Results ===
Win Draw Loss

19–22 April	Hampshire	v	Warwickshire (H)	Match drawn
Scorecard	319 (89.3 overs); AJA Wheater 74 (91); WB Rankin 6/75 (16.3 overs)		280 (85.3 overs); TR Ambrose 113 (159); JA Tomlinson 3/53 (17 overs)	Edgbaston, Birmingham; Umpires: Graham Lloyd and Tim Robinson
Scorecard	339 (94.2 overs); SM Ervine 102 (144); R Clarke 3/63 (16 overs)		244/5 (105.4 overs); V Chopra 119* (309); JA Tomlinson 2/56 (21 overs)	Edgbaston, Birmingham; Umpires: Graham Lloyd and Tim Robinson
Warwickshire won the toss and elected to field; Points: Hampshire 11, Warwickshire 10

26–29 April	Warwickshire	v	Yorkshire (H)	Match drawn
Scorecard	435 (143.3 overs); IJ Westwood 196 (377); TT Bresnan 5/85 (30 overs)		303 (98.3 overs); AW Gale 96 (182); WB Rankin 6/55 (15.3 overs)	Headingley, Leeds; Umpires: Steve Garratt and Jeremy Lloyds
Scorecard	219/7d (54.3 overs); IJ Westwood 84 (134); JD Middlebrook 5/82 (16.3 overs)		221/4 (64 overs); AJ Hodd 54* (93); JS Patel 3/70 (28 overs)	Headingley, Leeds; Umpires: Steve Garratt and Jeremy Lloyds
Warwickshire won the toss and elected to bat; Points: Warwickshire 11, Yorkshire 9

9–12 May	(H) Warwickshire	v	Worcestershire	Warwickshire won by 181 runs
Scorecard	264 (101.3 overs); SR Hain 82 (166); J Leach 6/73 (26.3 overs)		149 (42.5 overs); OB Cox 45 (72); KHD Barker 3/43 (15 overs)	Edgbaston, Birmingham; Umpires: David Millns and Martin Saggers
Scorecard	321/8d (109 overs); V Chopra 107 (229); J Leach 2/61 (24 overs)		255 (83 overs); OB Cox 44 (47); JS Patel 4/69 (22 overs)	Edgbaston, Birmingham; Umpires: David Millns and Martin Saggers
Worcestershire won the toss and elected to field; Points: Warwickshire 21, Worcestershire 3

17–20 May	(H) Warwickshire	v	Durham	Warwickshire won by 8 wickets
Scorecard	450 (107.4 overs); KHD Barker 102* (124); G Onions 5/85 (29 overs)		185 (40.5 overs); PD Collingwood 68 (77); RA Jones 4/48 (12 overs)	Edgbaston, Birmingham; Umpires: Nigel Cowley and Jeff Evans
Scorecard	327 (92.2 overs); Mark Stoneman 111 (216); Keith Barker 5/103 (27.2 overs)		63/2 (17.4 overs); Ian Westwood 32* (52); Chris Rushworth 1/16 (7 overs)	Edgbaston, Birmingham; Umpires: Nigel Cowley and Jeff Evans
Warwickshire won the toss and elected to bat; Points: Warwickshire 24, Durham 3

== Royal London-One Day Cup ==
=== Group B Table ===
Pos	Team	Pld	W	L	T	NR	Ded	Pts	NRR
1	Nottinghamshire Outlaws	8	5	1	0	2	0	12	0.755
2	Essex Eagles	8	4	2	0	2	0	10	0.480
3	Hampshire	8	3	3	0	2	0	9 (Note: The match between Glamorgan and Hampshire was abandoned due to a dangerous pitch (the match was recorded as a 'no result', but Hampshire were awarded 2 points and Glamorgan were docked 2 points).)	0.554
4	Kent Spitfires	8	3	3	0	2	0	8	0.031
5	Lancashire Lightning	8	3	3	0	2	0	8	−0.034
6	Warwickshire Bears	8	3	3	0	2	0	8	−0.765
7	Middlesex	8	3	4	0	1	0	7	−0.224
8	Glamorgan	8	2	2	0	4	4	3 (Note: Glamorgan were docked 2 points before the start of season after preparing an unfit pitch in 2014.)	0.160
9	Sussex Sharks	8	0	5	0	3	0	3	−1.063

=== Fixtures ===
Win No result Loss

== NatWest t20 Blast ==
=== North Division Table ===
Pos	Team	Pld	W	L	T	NR	Ded	Pts	NRR
1	Birmingham Bears	14	10	4	0	0	0	20	0.200
2	Worcestershire Rapids	14	9	4	0	1	0	19	0.682
3	Northamptonshire Steelbacks	14	7	5	0	2	0	16	0.115
4	Lancashire Lightning	14	7	6	0	1	0	15	0.469
5	Nottinghamshire Outlaws	14	7	6	0	1	0	15	0.018
6	Durham Jets	14	5	8	0	1	0	11	−0.149
7	Leicestershire Foxes	14	4	7	1	2	0	11	−0.304
8	Yorkshire Vikings	14	5	8	1	0	0	11	−0.324
9	Derbyshire Falcons	14	4	10	0	0	0	8	−0.662

=== Results ===
Win No result Loss

15 May	Birmingham Bears; 141/7 (20 overs)	v	Nottinghamshire Outlaws (H); 142/2 (14.3 overs)	Nottinghamshire Outlaws won by 8 wickets
18:30 (D/N); Scorecard	Birmingham Bears; 141/7 (20 overs)	v	Nottinghamshire Outlaws (H); 142/2 (14.3 overs)	Trent Bridge, Nottingham; Umpires: Martin Bodenham and Michael Gough; Player of the match: Alex Hales (Nottinghamshire Outlaws)
18:30 (D/N); Scorecard	Varun Chopra 80 (61); Luke Fletcher 3/24 (4 overs)		Alex Hales 86* (43); Rikki Clarke 1/18 (3 overs)	Trent Bridge, Nottingham; Umpires: Martin Bodenham and Michael Gough; Player of the match: Alex Hales (Nottinghamshire Outlaws)
Nottinghamshire Outlaws won the toss and elected to field; Tom Lewis (Birmingham Bears) made his T20 debut				Trent Bridge, Nottingham; Umpires: Martin Bodenham and Michael Gough; Player of the match: Alex Hales (Nottinghamshire Outlaws)
