= Warwickshire County Cricket Club in 2014 =

English cricket team season

Warwickshire County Cricket Club
2014 season
- Coach: (Scotland) Dougie Brown
- Captains: (England) Jim Troughton (England) Varun Chopra
- Overseas players: (New Zealand) Jeetan Patel (Pakistan) Shoaib Malik (t20)
- County Championship: 2nd
- One-Day Cup: Runners-up
- t20 Blast: Champions

The 2014 season was the 133rd year in the history of Warwickshire County Cricket Club and their 120th as a first-class county. In 2014, Warwickshire competed in the first division of the County Championship, Group B of the Royal London One-Day Cup and the North Division of the NatWest t20 Blast. In the NatWest t20 Blast, the club competed under the name "Birmingham Bears" for the first time. Twenty years after completing a treble, Warwickshire won their first ever t20 title, beating Lancashire in the final on home soil. They also reached the final in the Royal London One-Day Cup, where they lost to Durham at Lord's. Warwickshire also finished second in the County Championship, behind Yorkshire.

== Squad ==
The following players made at least one appearance for Warwickshire in the County Championship, Royal London One-Day Cup or NatWest t20 Blast during 2014. The age given is for the start of Warwickshire's first match of the season, on 13 April 2014.

Batsmen
Name	Nationality	Birth date	Batting style	Bowling style	Ref
Ian Bell	England	11 April 1982 (aged 32)	Right-handed	Right arm medium	
Varun Chopra	Scotland	15 December 1991 (aged 22)	Right-handed	Right arm off break	
Freddie Coleman	England	21 June 1987 (aged 26)	Right-handed	Right arm off break	
Laurie Evans	England	12 October 1987 (aged 26)	Right-handed	Right arm medium-fast	
Sam Hain	England	16 July 1995 (aged 18)	Right-handed	Right arm off break	
Ateeq Javid	England	15 October 1991 (aged 22)	Right-handed	Right arm medium, off break	
William Porterfield	Ireland	6 September 1984 (aged 29)	Left-handed	Right arm off break	
Jonathan Trott	England	22 April 1981 (aged 32)	Right-handed	Right arm medium	
Jim Troughton	England	2 March 1979 (aged 35)	Left-handed	Slow left-arm orthodox	
Jonathon Webb	England	12 January 1992 (aged 22)	Right-handed	Right arm medium	
Ian Westwood	England	13 July 1982 (aged 31)	Left-handed	Right arm off break	

All-rounders
Name	Nationality	Birth date	Batting style	Bowling style	Ref
Keith Barker	England	21 October 1986 (aged 27)	Left-handed	Left arm medium	
Paul Best	England	8 March 1991 (aged 23)	Left-handed	Slow left-arm orthodox	
Rikki Clarke	England	29 September 1981 (aged 32)	Right-handed	Right arm fast-medium	
Shoaib Malik	Pakistan	1 February 1982 (aged 32)	Right-handed	Right arm off break	
Chris Woakes	England	2 March 1989 (aged 25)	Right-handed	Right arm medium-fast	

Wicket-keepers
Name	Nationality	Birth date	Batting style	Bowling style	Ref
Tim Ambrose	England	1 December 1982 (aged 31)	Right-handed	—	
Peter McKay	England	12 October 1994 (aged 19)	Left-handed	—	

Bowlers
Name	Nationality	Birth date	Batting style	Bowling style	Ref
Recordo Gordon	England	12 October 1991 (aged 22)	Right-handed	Right arm fast-medium	
Oliver Hannon-Dalby	England	20 June 1989 (aged 24)	Left-handed	Right arm medium-fast	
Richard Jones	England	6 November 1986 (aged 27)	Right-handed	Right arm medium-fast	
Jeetan Patel	New Zealand	7 May 1980 (aged 33)	Right-handed	Right arm off break	
Boyd Rankin	England	5 July 1984 (aged 29)	Left-handed	Right arm medium-fast	
Chris Wright	England	14 July 1985 (aged 28)	Right-handed	Right arm fast-medium	

Correct as of 29 August 2014

== County Championship ==
=== Division One Table ===
Team	Pld	W	L	T	D	A	Bat	Bowl	Ded	Pts
Yorkshire (C)	16	8	1	0	7	0	48	44	0	255
Warwickshire	16	8	4	0	4	0	47	43	0	238
Sussex	16	6	4	0	5	1	44	40	0	210
Nottinghamshire	16	6	6	0	4	0	50	40	0	206
Durham	16	5	4	0	7	0	42	42	0	199
Somerset	16	4	2	0	10	0	42	42	0	198
Middlesex	16	4	5	0	6	1	35	38	2	170
Lancashire (R)	16	3	6	0	7	0	30	41	0	154
Northamptonshire (R)	16	0	12	0	4	0	27	32	0	79

=== Results ===
Win Draw Loss

13–16 April	Warwickshire (H)	v	Sussex	Sussex won by 7 wickets
Scorecard	87 (27.5 overs); Jonathan Trott 37 (64); Steve Magoffin 3/15 (9 overs)		229 (66.5 overs); Ed Joyce 117 (156); Keith Barker 3/52 (16 overs)	Edgbaston, Birmingham; Umpires: Nick Cook and Michael Gough
Scorecard	471 (120.3 overs); Ian Bell 189* (309); Steve Magoffin 3/88 (26 overs)		333/3 (83 overs); Ed Joyce 151* (237); Jeetan Patel 2/110 (29 overs)	Edgbaston, Birmingham; Umpires: Nick Cook and Michael Gough
Warwickshire won the toss and elected to bat; Points: Sussex 20, Warwickshire 3

20–23 April	Lancashire (H)	v	Warwickshire	Match drawn
Scorecard	247 (75 overs); Paul Horton 83 (187); Chris Woakes 5/63 (16 overs)		324 (111.4 overs); William Porterfield 77 (119); Tom Smith 4/67 (21 overs)	Old Trafford, Manchester; Umpires: Peter Hartley and Alex Wharf
Scorecard	196 (85.2 overs); Paul Horton 84 (220); Jeetan Patel 4/44 (25.2 overs)		95/5 (24.3 overs); Varun Chopra 50* (78); Simon Kerrigan 4/38 (9 overs)	Old Trafford, Manchester; Umpires: Peter Hartley and Alex Wharf
Lancashire won the toss and elected to bat; Points: Warwickshire 11, Lancashire 9

27–29 April	Warwickshire	v	Nottinghamshire (H)	Warwickshire won by 98 runs
Scorecard	263 (72.2 overs); Ian Bell 122 (148); Andy Carter 5/55 (13.2 overs)		116 (38 overs); Samit Patel 54 (93); Chris Woakes 3/13 (5 overs)	Trent Bridge, Nottingham; Umpires: Steve Garratt and David Millns
Scorecard	152 (39.3 overs); Tim Ambrose 29 (33); Peter Siddle 3/38 (12 overs)		201 (57 overs); Phil Jaques 64 (99); Chris Wright 4/70 (17 overs)	Trent Bridge, Nottingham; Umpires: Steve Garratt and David Millns
Nottinghamshire won the toss and elected to field; Points: Warwickshire 21, Nottinghamshire 3

4–7 May	Middlesex	v	Warwickshire (H)	Warwickshire won by an innings and 47 runs
Scorecard	167 (43.5 overs); Steven Finn 37* (49); Chris Wright 4/56 (14 overs)		462 (142.3 overs); Tim Ambrose 167 (269); Toby Roland-Jones 3/66 (29 overs)	Edgbaston, Birmingham; Umpires: Neil Mallender and Peter Willey
Scorecard	248 (91.2 overs); Chris Rogers 82 (139); Jeetan Patel 4/78 (31.2 overs)			Edgbaston, Birmingham; Umpires: Neil Mallender and Peter Willey
Middlesex won the toss and elected to bat; Points: Warwickshire 22, Middlesex 2

11–14 May	Yorkshire (H)	v	Warwickshire	Yorkshire won by an innings and 155 runs
Scorecard	444 (124.3 overs); Liam Plunkett 86 (75); Chris Woakes 4/68 (27.3 overs)		200 (81.1 overs); Ian Bell 97 (218); Jack Brooks 3/39 (11.1 overs)	Headingley, Leeds; Umpires: Graham Lloyd and Tim Robinson
Scorecard			89 (31.2 overs) (f/o); Tim Ambrose 28 (47); Jack Brooks 4/37 (12 overs)	Headingley, Leeds; Umpires: Graham Lloyd and Tim Robinson
Warwickshire won the toss and elected to field; Points: Yorkshire 23, Warwickshire 3

25–28 May	Somerset	v	Warwickshire (H)	Match drawn
Scorecard	411 (120.4 overs); James Hildreth 98 (155); Boyd Rankin 3/79 (26.4 overs)		294/5 (92.3 overs); William Porterfield 118 (229); Craig Overton 3/68 (20.3 overs)	Edgbaston, Birmingham; Umpires: Stephen Gale and Richard Illingworth
Warwickshire won the toss and elected to field; No play on the final day due to rain; Points: Warwickshire 9, Somerset 9

8–11 June	Lancashire	v	Warwickshire (H)	Match drawn
Scorecard	286 (106.3 overs); Alex Davies 59 (148); Jeetan Patel 4/64 (32.3 overs)		322 (123.4 overs); Tim Ambrose 62 (106); Tom Smith 3/50 (24.4 overs)	Edgbaston, Birmingham; Umpires: Mark Benson and David Millns
Scorecard	322/7 dec Steven Croft 104* (118); Boyd Rankin 3/39 (13 overs)		86/5 (40 overs); Varun Chopra 29 (55); Steven Croft 3/25 (15 overs)	Edgbaston, Birmingham; Umpires: Mark Benson and David Millns
Lancashire won the toss and elected to bat; Points: Warwickshire 10, Lancashire 9

15–18 June	Northamptonshire (H)	v	Warwickshire	Warwickshire won by an innings and 105 runs
Scorecard	312 (95.2 overs); Rob Newton 114 (185); Chris Woakes 4/87 (24 overs)		602/9 dec. (160 overs); Sam Hain 134 (284); James Middlebrook 3/120 (34 overs)	County Ground, Northampton; Umpires: Graham Lloyd and Jeremy Lloyds
Scorecard	185 (75 overs); James Middlebrook 50 (112); Chris Woakes 4/53 (21 overs)			County Ground, Northampton; Umpires: Graham Lloyd and Jeremy Lloyds
Northamptonshire won the toss and elected to bat; Points: Warwickshire 23, Northamptonshire 4

22–25 June	Warwickshire (H)	v	Yorkshire	Yorkshire won by an innings and 8 runs
Scorecard	228 (71.3 overs); Jeetan Patel 63* (67); Richard Pryah 3/37 (12 overs)		422 (117.3 overs); Aaron Finch 110 (146 overs); Chris Woakes 3/81 (24 overs)	Edgbaston, Birmingham; Umpires: Jeff Evans and Nigel Llong
Scorecard	186 (70 overs); William Porterfield 43 (131); Steven Patterson 3/26 (16 overs)			Edgbaston, Birmingham; Umpires: Jeff Evans and Nigel Llong
Warwickshire won the toss and elected to bat; Points: Yorkshire 24, Warwickshire 3

29 June – 2 July	Nottinghamshire	v	Warwickshire (H)	Warwickshire won by 6 wickets
Scorecard	406 (101 overs); Alex Hales 183 (224); Boyd Rankin 3/40 (14 overs)		343 (84.3 overs); Chris Woakes 91 (177); Andre Adams 4/67 (19 overs)	Edgbaston, Birmingham; Umpires: Martin Bodenham and Jeff Evans
Scorecard	225 (73.4 overs); Phil Jaques 79 (124); Chris Woakes 5/35 (16.4 overs)		289/7 (92.4 overs); Tim Ambrose 82* (154); Samit Patel 3/36 (23 overs)	Edgbaston, Birmingham; Umpires: Martin Bodenham and Jeff Evans
Warwickshire won the toss and elected to field; Points: Warwickshire 22, Nottinghamshire 8

13–16 July	Warwickshire	v	Durham (H)	Warwickshire won by an innings and 188 runs
Scorecard	472 (124.1 overs); Sam Hain 109* (193); John Hastings 5/94 (30 overs)		171 (57.1 overs); John Hastings 51 (66); Keith Barker 6/46 (22 overs)	Riverside Ground, Chester-le-Street; Umpires: Stephen Gale and Peter Hartley
Scorecard			113 (48.1 overs) (f/o); Keaton Jennings 37 (100); Jeetan Patel 5/49 (17 overs)	Riverside Ground, Chester-le-Street; Umpires: Stephen Gale and Peter Hartley
Durham won the toss and elected to field; Points: Warwickshire 24, Durham 2

21–24 July	Sussex (H)	v	Warwickshire	Sussex won by 226 runs
Scorecard	413 (129.4 overs); Luke Wright 89 (146); Keith Barker 3/65 (27 overs)		333 (111.5 overs); Jonathan Trott 106 (242); Steve Magoffin 4/74 (26 overs)	Cricket Field Road Ground, Horsham; Umpires: Steve O'Shaughnessy and Alex Wharf
Scorecard	245/9 dec. (60.1 overs); Ed Joyce 72 (106); Jeetan Patel 4/84 (24 overs)		99 (41.4 overs); Tim Ambrose 56 (131); James Tredwell 4/7 (12.4 overs)	Cricket Field Road Ground, Horsham; Umpires: Steve O'Shaughnessy and Alex Wharf
Sussex won the toss and elected to bat; Points: Sussex 23, Warwickshire 5

15–18 August	Warwickshire	v	Somerset (H)	Warwickshire won by 215 runs
Scorecard	367 (97.2 overs); Ian Westwood 129 (234); Craig Overton 3/76 (24 overs)		286 (77.1 overs); Tom Abell 95 (188); Richard Jones 4/81 (15 overs)	County Ground, Taunton; Umpires: Martin Bodenham and Steve O'Shaughnessy
Scorecard	322/7 dec. Varun Chopra 117* (264); Lewis Gregory 3/58 (18.2 overs)		188 (70.2 overs); Peter Trego 42 (80); Recordo Gordon 4/53 (14.2 overs)	County Ground, Taunton; Umpires: Martin Bodenham and Steve O'Shaughnessy
Somerset won the toss and elected to field; Points: Warwickshire 23, Somerset 5

31 August–3 September	Warwickshire	v	Middlesex (H)	Match drawn
				Lord's, London

9–12 September	Northamptonshire	v	Warwickshire (H)	Warwickshire won by an innings and 16 runs
Scorecard	273 (77.3 overs); James Kettleborough 71 (140); Oliver Hannon-Dalby 4/57 (17.3 overs)		573/9 dec. (155 overs); Sam Hain 208 (337); James Middlebrook 5/124 (47 overs)	Edgbaston, Birmingham; Umpires: Nick Cook and Tim Robinson
Scorecard	284 (85.2 overs); Ben Duckett 71 (91); Keith Barker 4/47 (20.2 overs)			Edgbaston, Birmingham; Umpires: Nick Cook and Tim Robinson
Warwickshire won the toss and elected to field; Points: Warwickshire 24, Northamptonshire 3

23–26 September	Durham	v	Warwickshire (H)	Warwickshire won by an innings and 13 runs
Scorecard	201 (64.5 overs); Ryan Pringle 63* (98); Keith Barker 5/59 (17 overs)		429 (119.3 overs); Varun Chopra 160 (244); Chris Rushworth 6/100 (31 overs)	Edgbaston, Birmingham; Umpires: Rob Bailey and Stephen Gale
Scorecard	215 (50.1 overs); Gordon Muchall 52 (54); Keith Barker 3/41 (15 overs)			Edgbaston, Birmingham; Umpires: Rob Bailey and Stephen Gale
Durham won the toss and elected to bat

== Royal London-One Day Cup ==
=== Group B Table ===
Pos	Team	Pld	W	L	T	NR	Ded	Pts	NRR
1	Nottinghamshire Outlaws	8	4	1	1	2	0	11	0.364
2	Kent Spitfires	8	4	1	1	2	0	11	0.245
3	Warwickshire Bears	8	4	3	0	1	0	9	0.343
4	Durham	8	4	3	0	1	0	9	0.212
5	Glamorgan	8	4	4	0	0	0	8	0.230
6	Somerset	8	3	4	1	0	0	7	0.067
7	Middlesex Panthers	8	3	4	0	1	0	7	−0.280
8	Sussex Sharks	8	3	5	0	0	0	6	−0.501
9	Surrey	8	1	5	1	1	0	4	−0.643

=== Fixtures ===
Win No result Loss

27 July	Warwickshire Bears; 240/7 (50 overs)	v	Middlesex Panthers (H); 236/8 (50 overs)	Warwickshire Bears won by 4 runs
Scorecard	Warwickshire Bears; 240/7 (50 overs)	v	Middlesex Panthers (H); 236/8 (50 overs)	Lord's, London

29 July	Warwickshire Bears (H); 273/5 (50 overs)	v	Sussex Sharks; 155 (39.2 overs)	Warwickshire Bears won by 118 runs
Scorecard	Warwickshire Bears (H); 273/5 (50 overs)	v	Sussex Sharks; 155 (39.2 overs)	Edgbaston, Birmingham

31 July	Warwickshire Bears; 264 (49.4 overs)	v	Durham (H); 265/5 (46.1 overs)	Durham won by 5 wickets
Scorecard	Warwickshire Bears; 264 (49.4 overs)	v	Durham (H); 265/5 (46.1 overs)	Roseworth Terrace, Gosforth

5 August	Somerset; 298/5 (50 overs)	v	Warwickshire Bears (H); 181 (40.1 overs)	Somerset won by 117 runs
Scorecard	Somerset; 298/5 (50 overs)	v	Warwickshire Bears (H); 181 (40.1 overs)	Edgbaston, Birmingham

10 August	Warwickshire Bears (H)	v	Kent Spitfires	Match abandoned
Scorecard	Warwickshire Bears (H)	v	Kent Spitfires	Rugby School Ground, Rugby

12 August	Warwickshire Bears (H); 218/2 (33 overs)	v	Surrey; 153 (26.3 overs)	Warwickshire Bears won by 111 runs (D/L method)
Scorecard	Warwickshire Bears (H); 218/2 (33 overs)	v	Surrey; 153 (26.3 overs)	Edgbaston, Birmingham

14 August	Glamorgan (H); 225/7 (39 overs)	v	Warwickshire Bears; 90/3 (8.3 overs)	Warwickshire Bears won by 7 wickets (D/L method)
Scorecard	Glamorgan (H); 225/7 (39 overs)	v	Warwickshire Bears; 90/3 (8.3 overs)	St. Helen's, Swansea

20 August	Warwickshire Bears; 302/7 (50 overs)	v	Nottinghamshire Outlaws (H); 306/9 (50 overs)	Nottinghamshire Outlaws won by 1 wicket
Scorecard	Warwickshire Bears; 302/7 (50 overs)	v	Nottinghamshire Outlaws (H); 306/9 (50 overs)	Trent Bridge, Nottingham

=== Knockout stage ===
Quarter-finals
Nottinghamshire Outlaws (H)	313/5
Derbyshire Falcons	228
Durham	237
Yorkshire Vikings (H)	206
Warwickshire Bears	271/7
Essex Eagles (H)	204
Kent Spitfires (H)	242
Gloucestershire	218

Semi-finals
Kent Spitfires	215/8
Warwickshire Bears (H)	219/4
Durham (H)	353/8
Nottinghamshire Outlaws	270

Final
Warwickshire Bears	165
Durham	166/7

Quarter-final

28 August	Warwickshire Bears; 271/7 (50 overs)	v	Essex Eagles (H); 204 (42.4 overs)	Warwickshire Bears won by 67 runs
14:00 (D/N); Scorecard	Warwickshire Bears; 271/7 (50 overs)	v	Essex Eagles (H); 204 (42.4 overs)	County Ground, Chelmsford; Umpires: Neil Mallender and David Millns; Player of the match: Rikki Clarke (Warwickshire Bears)
14:00 (D/N); Scorecard	Rikki Clarke 68 (84); Reece Topley 3/56 (10 overs)		Jesse Ryder 90 (95); Oliver Hannon-Dalby 4/44 (8.4 overs)	County Ground, Chelmsford; Umpires: Neil Mallender and David Millns; Player of the match: Rikki Clarke (Warwickshire Bears)
Essex Eagles won the toss and elected to field				County Ground, Chelmsford; Umpires: Neil Mallender and David Millns; Player of the match: Rikki Clarke (Warwickshire Bears)

Semi-final

4 September	Kent Spitfires; 215/8 (50 overs)	v	Warwickshire Bears (H); 219/4 (46.3 overs)	Warwickshire Bears won by 6 wickets
14:00 (D/N); Scorecard	Kent Spitfires; 215/8 (50 overs)	v	Warwickshire Bears (H); 219/4 (46.3 overs)	Edgbaston, Birmingham; Umpires: Steve O'Shaughnessy and Tim Robinson; Player of the match: Boyd Rankin (Warwickshire Bears)
14:00 (D/N); Scorecard	Sam Billings 40* (40); Boyd Rankin 3/34 (10 overs)		Jonathan Trott 58 (68); David Griffiths 2/29 (8 overs)	Edgbaston, Birmingham; Umpires: Steve O'Shaughnessy and Tim Robinson; Player of the match: Boyd Rankin (Warwickshire Bears)
Kent Spitfires won the toss and elected to bat				Edgbaston, Birmingham; Umpires: Steve O'Shaughnessy and Tim Robinson; Player of the match: Boyd Rankin (Warwickshire Bears)

Final

20 September	Warwickshire Bears; 165 (47 overs)	v	Durham; 166/7 (40.2 overs)	Durham won by 3 wickets
10:30; Scorecard	Warwickshire Bears; 165 (47 overs)	v	Durham; 166/7 (40.2 overs)	Lord's, London; Umpires: Michael Gough and Peter Hartley; Player of the match: Ben Stokes (Durham)
10:30; Scorecard	Varun Chopra 64 (113); Gareth Breese 3/30 (7 overs)		Mark Stoneman 52 (52); Jeetan Patel 4/25 (10 overs)	Lord's, London; Umpires: Michael Gough and Peter Hartley; Player of the match: Ben Stokes (Durham)
Durham won the toss and elected to field				Lord's, London; Umpires: Michael Gough and Peter Hartley; Player of the match: Ben Stokes (Durham)

== NatWest t20 Blast ==
=== North Division Table ===
Pos	Team	Pld	W	L	T	NR	Ded	Pts	NRR
1	Lancashire Lightning	14	10	2	0	2	0	22	0.846
2	Nottinghamshire Outlaws	14	9	3	0	2	0	20	0.642
3	Worcestershire Rapids	14	8	4	0	2	0	18	0.480
4	Birmingham Bears	14	7	5	0	2	0	16	0.235
5	Yorkshire Vikings	14	6	5	0	3	0	15	0.588
6	Durham Jets	14	5	7	0	2	0	12	0.106
7	Northamptonshire Steelbacks	14	4	7	0	3	0	11	−0.899
8	Leicestershire Foxes	14	4	9	0	1	0	9	−0.552
9	Derbyshire Falcons	14	1	12	0	1	0	3	−1.406

=== Results ===
Win No result Loss

23 May	Birmingham Bears (H)	v	Yorkshire Vikings	Match abandoned
Scorecard	Birmingham Bears (H)	v	Yorkshire Vikings	Edgbaston, Birmingham

30 May	Lancashire Lightning (H); 126 (19.5 overs)	v	Birmingham Bears; 111 (20 overs)	Lancashire lightning won by 15 runs
Scorecard	Lancashire Lightning (H); 126 (19.5 overs)	v	Birmingham Bears; 111 (20 overs)	Old Trafford, Manchester
Scorecard	Tom Smith 44 (38); Jeetan Patel 3/15 (4 overs)		Laurie Evans 29 (31); Junaid Khan 4/12 (4 overs)	Old Trafford, Manchester

1 June	Birmingham Bears; 175/9 (20 overs)	v	Leicestershire Foxes (H); 150/6 (20 overs)	Birmingham Bears won by 25 runs
Scorecard	Birmingham Bears; 175/9 (20 overs)	v	Leicestershire Foxes (H); 150/6 (20 overs)	Grace Road, Leicester
Scorecard	William Porterfield 67 (56); Nathan Buck 3/37 (4 overs)		Tom Wells 51 (35); Jeetan Patel 2/19 (3 overs)	Grace Road, Leicester

6 June	Durham Jets; 146/7 (20 overs)	v	Birmingham Bears (H); 147/4 (19.1 overs)	Birmingham Bears won by 6 wickets
Scorecard	Durham Jets; 146/7 (20 overs)	v	Birmingham Bears (H); 147/4 (19.1 overs)	Edgbaston, Birmingham
Scorecard	John Hastings 36 (25); Jeetan Patel 2/23 (4 overs)		Varun Chopra 51 (66); Usman Arshad 2/24 (4 overs)	Edgbaston, Birmingham

13 June	Birmingham Bears; 156/5 (20 overs)	v	Nottinghamshire Outlaws (H); 138/7 (20 overs)	Birmingham Bears won by 18 runs
Scorecard	Birmingham Bears; 156/5 (20 overs)	v	Nottinghamshire Outlaws (H); 138/7 (20 overs)	Trent Bridge, Nottingham
Scorecard	Laurie Evans 45* (34); Samit Patel 3/26 (4 overs)		Alex Hales 30 (23); Shoaib Malik 2/21 (3 overs)	Trent Bridge, Nottingham

19 June	Northamptonshire Steelbacks; 133/7 (20 overs)	v	Birmingham Bears (H); 136/2 (16 overs)	Birmingham Bears won by 8 wickets
Scorecard	Northamptonshire Steelbacks; 133/7 (20 overs)	v	Birmingham Bears (H); 136/2 (16 overs)	Edgbaston, Birmingham
Scorecard	Steven Crook 51* (40); Chris Wright 3/37 (4 overs)		Varun Chopra 68* (62); Azharullah 1/18 (3 overs)	Edgbaston, Birmingham

20 June	Birmingham Bears; 133/8 (20 overs)	v	Worcestershire Rapids (H); 134/2 (14.3 overs)	Worcestershire Rapids won by 8 wickets
Scorecard	Birmingham Bears; 133/8 (20 overs)	v	Worcestershire Rapids (H); 134/2 (14.3 overs)	New Road, Worcester
Scorecard	Shoaib Malik 50 (40); Jack Shantry 3/25 (4 overs)		Daryl Mitchell 62* (45); Chris Woakes 1/32 (3 overs)	New Road, Worcester

27 June	Birmingham Bears; 189/5 (20 overs)	v	Derbyshire Falcons (H); 193/7 (19 overs)	Derbyshire Falcons won by 3 wickets
Scorecard	Birmingham Bears; 189/5 (20 overs)	v	Derbyshire Falcons (H); 193/7 (19 overs)	County Ground, Derby
Scorecard	William Porterfield 74 (41); Wes Durston 1/23 (3 overs)		Wes Durston 53 (21); Chris Woakes 2/33 (4 overs)	County Ground, Derby

3 July	Northamptonshire Steelbacks (H); 139/8 (20 overs)	v	Birmingham Bears; 124/9 (20 overs)	Northamptonshire Steelbacks won by 15 runs
Scorecard	Northamptonshire Steelbacks (H); 139/8 (20 overs)	v	Birmingham Bears; 124/9 (20 overs)	County Ground, Northampton
Scorecard	Kyle Coetzer 40 (46); Jeetan Patel 3/19 (4 overs)		Shoaib Malik 47 (38); Azharullah 2/23 (4 overs)	County Ground, Northampton

4 July	Birmingham Bears (H)	v	Lancashire Lightning	Match abandoned
Scorecard	Birmingham Bears (H)	v	Lancashire Lightning	Edgbaston, Birmingham

8 July	Nottinghamshire Outlaws; 158/9 (20 overs)	v	Birmingham Bears (H); 152/6 (20 overs)	Nottinghamshire Outlaws won by 6 runs
Scorecard	Nottinghamshire Outlaws; 158/9 (20 overs)	v	Birmingham Bears (H); 152/6 (20 overs)	Edgbaston, Birmingham
Scorecard	James Taylor 44 (47); Jeetan Patel 3/16 (4 overs)		William Porterfield 51 (42); Steven Mullaney 2/27(4 overs)	Edgbaston, Birmingham

11 July	Worcestershire Rapids; 175/6 (20 overs)	v	Birmingham Bears (H); 176/5 (19.2 overs)	Birmingham Bears won by 5 wickets
Scorecard	Worcestershire Rapids; 175/6 (20 overs)	v	Birmingham Bears (H); 176/5 (19.2 overs)	Edgbaston, Birmingham
Scorecard	Tom Kohler-Cadmore 51 (34); Jeetan Patel 2/17 (3 overs)		Varun Chopra 74* (49); Saeed Ajmal 3/17 (4 overs)	Edgbaston, Birmingham

18 July	Yorkshire Vikings (H); 147/6 (20 overs)	v	Birmingham Bears; 148/5 (19.4 overs)	Birmingham Bears won by 5 wickets
Scorecard	Yorkshire Vikings (H); 147/6 (20 overs)	v	Birmingham Bears; 148/5 (19.4 overs)	Headingley, Leeds
Scorecard	Tim Bresnan 45* (36); Jeetan Patel 4/19 (4 overs)		Laurie Evans 69* (43); Ryan Sidebottom 2/38 (4 overs)	Headingley, Leeds
Jeetan Patel (Birmingham Bears) took a hat-trick during the 9th over of the Yorkshire Vikings innings				Headingley, Leeds

25 July	Birmingham Bears (H); 160/6 (20 overs)	v	Leicestershire Foxes; 108 (19.5 overs)	Birmingham Bears won by 52 runs
Scorecard	Birmingham Bears (H); 160/6 (20 overs)	v	Leicestershire Foxes; 108 (19.5 overs)	Edgbaston, Birmingham
Scorecard	Varun Chopra 72 (57); Jigar Naik 2/23 (4 overs)		Matthew Boyce 41 (43); Recordo Gordon 3/18 (4 overs)	Edgbaston, Birmingham

=== Knockout stage ===
Quarter-finals
Lancashire Lightning (H)	137/8
Glamorgan	136/7
Worcestershire Rapids	141/9
Surrey (H)	144/7
Birmingham Bears	197/2
Essex Eagles (H)	178/5
Nottinghamshire Outlaws (H)	197/2
Hampshire	198/5

Semi-finals
Birmingham Bears	194/4
Surrey	178/7
Lancashire Lightning	160/5
Hampshire	101

Final
Birmingham Bears	181/5
Lancashire Lightning	177/8

Quarter-final

2 August	Birmingham Bears; 197/2 (20 overs)	v	Essex Eagles (H); 178/5 (20 overs)	Birmingham Bears won by 19 runs
18:00; Scorecard	Birmingham Bears; 197/2 (20 overs)	v	Essex Eagles (H); 178/5 (20 overs)	County Ground, Chelmsford; Umpires: David Millns (Eng) & Tim Robinson (Eng); Player of the match: Rikki Clarke
18:00; Scorecard	Varun Chopra 86* (54); Ravi Bopara 2/42 (4 overs)		Ryan ten Doeschate 61* (37); Boyd Rankin 3/34 (4 overs)	County Ground, Chelmsford; Umpires: David Millns (Eng) & Tim Robinson (Eng); Player of the match: Rikki Clarke
Essex Eagles won the toss and elected to field				County Ground, Chelmsford; Umpires: David Millns (Eng) & Tim Robinson (Eng); Player of the match: Rikki Clarke

Semi-final

23 August	Birmingham Bears; 194/4 (20 overs)	v	Surrey; 178/7 (20 overs)	Birmingham Bears won by 16 runs
11:00; Scorecard	Birmingham Bears; 194/4 (20 overs)	v	Surrey; 178/7 (20 overs)	Edgbaston, Birmingham; Umpires: Michael Gough and Tim Robinson; Player of the match: William Porterfield
11:00; Scorecard	William Porterfield 81* (47); Gareth Batty 1/24 (4 overs)		Jason Roy 58 (25); Ateeq Javid 2/13 (3 overs)	Edgbaston, Birmingham; Umpires: Michael Gough and Tim Robinson; Player of the match: William Porterfield
Surrey won the toss and elected to field				Edgbaston, Birmingham; Umpires: Michael Gough and Tim Robinson; Player of the match: William Porterfield

Final

23 August	Birmingham Bears; 181/5 (20 overs)	v	Lancashire Lightning; 177/8 (20 overs)	Birmingham Bears won by 4 runs
18:45; Scorecard	Birmingham Bears; 181/5 (20 overs)	v	Lancashire Lightning; 177/8 (20 overs)	Edgbaston, Birmingham; Umpires: Rob Bailey and Michael Gough; Player of the match: Laurie Evans
18:45; Scorecard	Laurie Evans 53 (30); Tom Smith 2/30 (3 overs)		Karl Brown 55 (28); Oliver Hannon-Dalby 3/31 (4 overs)	Edgbaston, Birmingham; Umpires: Rob Bailey and Michael Gough; Player of the match: Laurie Evans
Birmingham Bears won the toss and elected to bat				Edgbaston, Birmingham; Umpires: Rob Bailey and Michael Gough; Player of the match: Laurie Evans
