= 2014 One-Day Cup =

2014 Royal London One-Day Cup
- Dates: 26 July – 20 September 2014
- Administrator: England and Wales Cricket Board
- Cricket format: Limited overs cricket (50 overs)
- Tournament format(s): Group stage and knockout
- Champions: Durham
- Participants: 18
- Matches: 79
- Most runs: 575 Jacques Rudolph (Glamorgan)
- Most wickets: 23 Jeetan Patel (Warwickshire)
- Official website: ecb.co.uk

The 2014 One-Day Cup (also known as for sponsorship reasons as the 2014 Royal London One-Day Cup) was the 2014 season England and Wales Cricket Board limited overs cricket competition for the England and Wales first-class counties. It replaced the ECB 40 tournament that ran from 2010 to 2013. The number of overs per innings was increased to 50 to bring the competition in line with One Day Internationals and the national teams of Scotland, the Netherlands and the Unicorns cricket team (a team formed of players who do not have first-class contracts) did not participate in the competition.

Durham won the tournament, defeating Warwickshire by three wickets in the final at Lord's on 20 September 2014. This was Durham's second limited overs title in first-class cricket after the 2007 Friends Provident Trophy.

== Competition format ==
The competition consisted of two groups of nine teams, from which the top four teams from each group progressed to the quarter-finals. The groups were allocated randomly:

| Group A | Group B |
|---|---|
| Hampshire | Kent Spitfires |
| Derbyshire Falcons | Durham |
| Lancashire Lightning | Glamorgan |
| Gloucestershire | Nottinghamshire Outlaws |
| Leicestershire Foxes | Sussex Sharks |
| Northamptonshire Steelbacks | Warwickshire Bears |
| Worcestershire | Surrey |
| Essex Eagles | Middlesex Panthers |
| Yorkshire Vikings | Somerset |

== Group stage ==
=== Group A ===
==== Table ====
| Pos | Team | Pld | W | L | T | NR | Ded | Pts | NRR |
|---|---|---|---|---|---|---|---|---|---|
| 1 | Yorkshire Vikings | 8 | 6 | 2 | 0 | 0 | 0 | 12 | 1.040 |
| 2 | Essex Eagles | 8 | 5 | 1 | 0 | 2 | 0 | 12 | 0.387 |
| 3 | Gloucestershire | 8 | 4 | 2 | 0 | 2 | 0 | 10 | −0.016 |
| 4 | Derbyshire Falcons | 8 | 4 | 2 | 0 | 2 | 2 | 8 (Note: Derbyshire were docked 2 points before the start of season after preparing an unfit pitch in 2013.) | 0.045 |
| 5 | Leicestershire Foxes | 8 | 3 | 4 | 0 | 1 | 0 | 7 | −0.393 |
| 6 | Northamptonshire Steelbacks | 8 | 2 | 4 | 0 | 2 | 0 | 6 | −0.277 |
| 7 | Worcestershire | 8 | 2 | 4 | 0 | 2 | 0 | 6 | −0.328 |
| 8 | Lancashire Lightning | 8 | 2 | 5 | 0 | 1 | 0 | 5 | −0.279 |
| 9 | Hampshire | 8 | 1 | 5 | 0 | 2 | 0 | 4 | −0.569 |

==== Fixtures ====
26 July
Scorecard

| Derbyshire Falcons; 340/5 (50 overs) | v | Hampshire; 204 (34.2 overs) |
| Wayne Madsen 138 (127); Matt Coles 3/62 (10 overs) | | Michael Carberry 55 (47); David Wainwright 4/34 (9.2 overs) |

Derbyshire Falcons won by 136 runs
County Ground, Derby
Umpires: Martin Bodenham and Peter Willey

- Hampshire won the toss and elected to field.
- Tom Taylor (Derbyshire Falcons) made his List A debut.

26 July
Scorecard

| Yorkshire Vikings; 324/7 (50 overs) | v | Lancashire Lightning; 277 (46.4 overs) |
| Kane Williamson 70 (82); Kabir Ali 3/77 (10 overs) | | Karl Brown 129 (99); Tim Bresnan 2/40 (7.4 overs) |

Yorkshire Vikings won by 47 runs
Old Trafford, Manchester
Umpires: Martin Saggers and Nick Cook

- Yorkshire Vikings won the toss and elected to bat.

27 July
Scorecard

| Gloucestershire; 240/9 (50 overs) | v | Northamptonshire Steelbacks; 242/6 (42.1 overs) |
| Michael Klinger 98 (131); David Willey 4/33 (10 overs) | | Adam Rossington 82 (91); Tom Smith 2/55 (8.1 overs) |

Northamptonshire Steelbacks won by 4 wickets
College Ground, Cheltenham
Umpires: Peter Hartley and Russell Evans

- Northamptonshire Steelbacks won the toss and elected to field.

27 July
Scorecard

| Leicestershire Foxes; 248/8 (50 overs) | v | Derbyshire Falcons; 251/3 (45.1 overs) |
| Matthew Boyce 64 (83); Mark Footitt 5/59 (10 overs) | | Wayne Madsen 105* (99); Charlie Shreck 1/32 (7 overs) |

Derbyshire Falcons won by 7 wickets
Grace Road, Leicester
Umpires: Billy Taylor and Neil Mallender

- Leicestershire Foxes won the toss and elected to bat.
- Angus Robson (Leicestershire Foxes) made his List A debut.

27 July
Scorecard

| Worcestershire; 238/7 (50 overs) | v | Essex Eagles; 242/2 (42.2 overs) |
| Joe Leach 45* (34); Graham Napier 4/59 (10 overs) | | Mark Pettini 102* (112); Joe Leach 1/41 (9 overs) |

Essex Eagles won by 8 wickets
New Road, Worcester
Umpires: Neil Bainton and Peter Willey

- Essex Eagles won the toss and elected to field.
- Richard Oliver (Worcestershire) made his List A debut.

27 July
Scorecard

| Hampshire; 360/9 (50 overs) | v | Lancashire Lightning; 212 (37.2 overs) |
| Glenn Maxwell 146 (96); Wayne White 3/61 (10 overs) | | Paul Horton 57 (50); Chris Wood 2/27 (6 overs) |

Hampshire won by 148 runs
Old Trafford, Manchester
Umpires: Nick Cook and Paul Baldwin

- Hampshire won the toss and elected to bat.

| 29 July | Worcestershire; 274/9 (50 overs) | v | Northamptonshire Steelbacks (H); 186 (38.2 overs) | Worcestershire won by 88 runs |
| Scorecard | Worcestershire; 274/9 (50 overs) | v | Northamptonshire Steelbacks (H); 186 (38.2 overs) | Campbell Park, Milton Keynes |

| 29 July | Yorkshire Vikings (H); 192 (41.4 overs) | v | Gloucestershire; 193/7 (45.2 overs) | Gloucestershire won by 3 wickets |
| Scorecard | Yorkshire Vikings (H); 192 (41.4 overs) | v | Gloucestershire; 193/7 (45.2 overs) | Headingley, Leeds |

| 31 July | Gloucestershire (H); 233 (49.5 overs) | v | Hampshire; 198 (47.2 overs) | Gloucestershire won by 35 runs |
| Scorecard | Gloucestershire (H); 233 (49.5 overs) | v | Hampshire; 198 (47.2 overs) | County Ground, Bristol |

| 31 July | Worcestershire (H); 261 (49 overs) | v | Derbyshire Falcons; 37/0 (7.4 overs) | No result |
| Scorecard | Worcestershire (H); 261 (49 overs) | v | Derbyshire Falcons; 37/0 (7.4 overs) | New Road, Worcester |

| 31 July | Leicestershire Foxes; 142 (40.3 overs) | v | Essex Eagles (H); 108 (32.3 overs) | Leicestershire Foxes won by 34 runs |
| Scorecard | Leicestershire Foxes; 142 (40.3 overs) | v | Essex Eagles (H); 108 (32.3 overs) | County Ground, Chelmsford |

| 5 August | Lancashire Lightning; 247/7 (50 overs) | v | Essex Eagles (H); 249/4 (38.1 overs) | Essex Eagles won by 6 wickets |
| Scorecard | Lancashire Lightning; 247/7 (50 overs) | v | Essex Eagles (H); 249/4 (38.1 overs) | County Ground, Chelmsford |

| 5 August | Leicestershire Foxes; 136/8 (25 overs) | v | Gloucestershire (H); 133/3 (22.5 overs) | Gloucestershire won by 7 wickets (D/L method) |
| Scorecard | Leicestershire Foxes; 136/8 (25 overs) | v | Gloucestershire (H); 133/3 (22.5 overs) | County Ground, Bristol |

| 5 August | Northamptonshire Steelbacks (H); 209/7 (38 overs) | v | Yorkshire Vikings; 213/4 (34 overs) | Yorkshire Vikings won by 6 wickets |
| Scorecard | Northamptonshire Steelbacks (H); 209/7 (38 overs) | v | Yorkshire Vikings; 213/4 (34 overs) | County Ground, Northampton |

| 6 August | Hampshire (H); 275/9 (50 overs) | v | Leicestershire Foxes; 186/4 (24.2 overs) | Leicestershire Foxes won by 6 wickets (D/L method) |
| Scorecard | Hampshire (H); 275/9 (50 overs) | v | Leicestershire Foxes; 186/4 (24.2 overs) | The Rose Bowl, Southampton |

| 7 August | Worcestershire; 141 (43.2 overs) | v | Yorkshire Vikings (H); 144/4 (30.2 overs) | Yorkshire Vikings won by 6 wickets |
| Scorecard | Worcestershire; 141 (43.2 overs) | v | Yorkshire Vikings (H); 144/4 (30.2 overs) | Headingley, Leeds |

| 7 August | Lancashire Lightning; 300/8 (50 overs) | v | Derbyshire Falcons (H); 199 (40.3 overs) | Lancashire Lightning won by 101 runs |
| Scorecard | Lancashire Lightning; 300/8 (50 overs) | v | Derbyshire Falcons (H); 199 (40.3 overs) | County Ground, Derby |

| 8 August | Leicestershire Foxes (H); 236/8 (50 overs) | v | Yorkshire Vikings; 193/7 (31.3 overs) | Yorkshire Vikings won by 3 wickets (D/L method) |
| Scorecard | Leicestershire Foxes (H); 236/8 (50 overs) | v | Yorkshire Vikings; 193/7 (31.3 overs) | Grace Road, Leicester |

| 8 August | Gloucestershire; 55/1 (11.1 overs) | v | Essex Eagles (H) | No result |
| Scorecard | Gloucestershire; 55/1 (11.1 overs) | v | Essex Eagles (H) | County Ground, Chelmsford |

| 8 August | Hampshire (H); 249 (48.4 overs) | v | Northamptonshire Steelbacks | No result |
| Scorecard | Hampshire (H); 249 (48.4 overs) | v | Northamptonshire Steelbacks | The Rose Bowl, Southampton |

| 9 August | Lancashire Lightning; 304/7 (50 overs) | v | Worcestershire (H); 305/3 (47.5 overs) | Worcestershire won by 7 wickets |
| Scorecard | Lancashire Lightning; 304/7 (50 overs) | v | Worcestershire (H); 305/3 (47.5 overs) | New Road, Worcester |

| 10 August | Derbyshire Falcons (H) | v | Essex Eagles | Match abandoned |
| Scorecard | Derbyshire Falcons (H) | v | Essex Eagles | County Ground, Derby |

| 10 August | Leicestershire Foxes (H) | v | Northamptonshire Steelbacks | Match abandoned |
| Scorecard | Leicestershire Foxes (H) | v | Northamptonshire Steelbacks | Grace Road, Leicester |

| 11 August | Yorkshire Vikings (H); 290/6 (50 overs) | v | Essex Eagles; 291/5 (45.5 overs) | Essex Eagles won by 5 wickets |
| Scorecard | Yorkshire Vikings (H); 290/6 (50 overs) | v | Essex Eagles; 291/5 (45.5 overs) | North Marine Road Ground, Scarborough |

| 11 August | Hampshire (H); 42/0 (4.1 overs) | v | Worcestershire | No result |
| Scorecard | Hampshire (H); 42/0 (4.1 overs) | v | Worcestershire | The Rose Bowl, Southampton |

| 11 August | Derbyshire Falcons; 211/6 (32 overs) | v | Northamptonshire Steelbacks (H); 220/9 (32 overs) | Derbyshire Falcons won by 6 runs (D/L method) |
| Scorecard | Derbyshire Falcons; 211/6 (32 overs) | v | Northamptonshire Steelbacks (H); 220/9 (32 overs) | County Ground, Northampton |

| 12 August | Gloucestershire (H) | v | Lancashire Lightning | Match abandoned |
| Scorecard | Gloucestershire (H) | v | Lancashire Lightning | County Ground, Bristol |

| 13 August | Worcestershire (H); 229 (48.5 overs) | v | Gloucestershire; 216/5 (38.1 overs) | Gloucestershire won by 5 wickets (D/L method) |
| Scorecard | Worcestershire (H); 229 (48.5 overs) | v | Gloucestershire; 216/5 (38.1 overs) | New Road, Worcester |

| 13 August | Derbyshire Falcons; 151 (41 overs) | v | Yorkshire Vikings (H); 155/0 (29.3 overs) | Yorkshire Vikings won by 10 wickets |
| Scorecard | Derbyshire Falcons; 151 (41 overs) | v | Yorkshire Vikings (H); 155/0 (29.3 overs) | North Marine Road Ground, Scarborough |

| 13 August | Essex Eagles (H); 324 (50 overs) | v | Hampshire; 319/9 (50 overs) | Essex Eagles won by 5 runs |
| Scorecard | Essex Eagles (H); 324 (50 overs) | v | Hampshire; 319/9 (50 overs) | County Ground, Chelmsford |

| 14 August | Worcestershire; 202/9 (34 overs) | v | Leicestershire Foxes (H); 93/2 (15.4 overs) | Leicestershire Foxes won by 16 runs (D/L method) |
| Scorecard | Worcestershire; 202/9 (34 overs) | v | Leicestershire Foxes (H); 93/2 (15.4 overs) | Grace Road, Leicester |

| 14 August | Northamptonshire Steelbacks; 200/8 (40 overs) | v | Lancashire Lightning (H); 47/3 (10.1 overs) | Northamptonshire Steelbacks won by 19 runs (D/L method) |
| Scorecard | Northamptonshire Steelbacks; 200/8 (40 overs) | v | Lancashire Lightning (H); 47/3 (10.1 overs) | Old Trafford, Manchester |

| 21 August | Derbyshire Falcons (H); 271/7 (50 overs) | v | Gloucestershire; 218 (39.5 overs) | Derbyshire Falcons won by 53 runs |
| Scorecard | Derbyshire Falcons (H); 271/7 (50 overs) | v | Gloucestershire; 218 (39.5 overs) | County Ground, Derby |

| 21 August | Hampshire (H); 172 (39 overs) | v | Yorkshire Vikings; 173/4 (28.5 overs) | Yorkshire Vikings won by 6 wickets |
| Scorecard | Hampshire (H); 172 (39 overs) | v | Yorkshire Vikings; 173/4 (28.5 overs) | The Rose Bowl, Southampton |

| 21 August | Leicestershire Foxes; 184 (43.1 overs) | v | Lancashire Lightning (H); 185/2 (30 overs) | Lancashire Lightning won by 8 wickets |
| Scorecard | Leicestershire Foxes; 184 (43.1 overs) | v | Lancashire Lightning (H); 185/2 (30 overs) | Old Trafford, Manchester |

| 21 August | Northamptonshire Steelbacks (H); 311 (47 overs) | v | Essex Eagles; 315/6 (49.3 overs) | Essex Eagles won by 4 wickets |
| Scorecard | Northamptonshire Steelbacks (H); 311 (47 overs) | v | Essex Eagles; 315/6 (49.3 overs) | County Ground, Northampton |

=== Group B ===
==== Table ====
| Pos | Team | Pld | W | L | T | NR | Ded | Pts | NRR |
|---|---|---|---|---|---|---|---|---|---|
| 1 | Nottinghamshire Outlaws | 8 | 4 | 1 | 1 | 2 | 0 | 11 | 0.364 |
| 2 | Kent Spitfires | 8 | 4 | 1 | 1 | 2 | 0 | 11 | 0.245 |
| 3 | Warwickshire Bears | 8 | 4 | 3 | 0 | 1 | 0 | 9 | 0.343 |
| 4 | Durham | 8 | 4 | 3 | 0 | 1 | 0 | 9 | 0.212 |
| 5 | Glamorgan | 8 | 4 | 4 | 0 | 0 | 0 | 8 | 0.230 |
| 6 | Somerset | 8 | 3 | 4 | 1 | 0 | 0 | 7 | 0.067 |
| 7 | Middlesex Panthers | 8 | 3 | 4 | 0 | 1 | 0 | 7 | −0.280 |
| 8 | Sussex Sharks | 8 | 3 | 5 | 0 | 0 | 0 | 6 | −0.501 |
| 9 | Surrey | 8 | 1 | 5 | 1 | 1 | 0 | 4 | −0.643 |

==== Fixtures ====
26 July
Scorecard

| Middlesex Panthers; 174/8 (50 overs) | v | Glamorgan; 175/3 (36.2 overs) |
| Neil Dexter 43* (85); David Lloyd 3/25 (8 overs) | | Jim Allenby 70 (90); Ravi Patel 2/43 (10 overs) |

Glamorgan won by 7 wickets
Sophia Gardens, Cardiff
Umpires: Nigel Cowley and Steve Garratt

- Glamorgan won the toss and elected to field.
- Dewi Penrhyn Jones, David Lloyd (both Glamorgan), Nick Gubbins and Ryan Higgins (both Middlesex Panthers) made their List A debuts.

| 27 July | Warwickshire Bears; 240/7 (50 overs) | v | Middlesex Panthers (H); 236/8 (50 overs) | Warwickshire Bears won by 4 runs |
| Scorecard | Warwickshire Bears; 240/7 (50 overs) | v | Middlesex Panthers (H); 236/8 (50 overs) | Lord's, London |

| 27 July | Durham; 311/7 (50 overs) | v | Somerset (H); 315/5 (46.4 overs) | Somerset won by 5 wickets |
| Scorecard | Durham; 311/7 (50 overs) | v | Somerset (H); 315/5 (46.4 overs) | County Ground, Taunton |

| 27 July | Nottinghamshire Outlaws; 312/8 (50 overs) | v | Sussex Sharks (H); 283/8 (50 overs) | Nottinghamshire Outlaws won by 29 runs |
| Scorecard | Nottinghamshire Outlaws; 312/8 (50 overs) | v | Sussex Sharks (H); 283/8 (50 overs) | Cricket Field Road Ground, Horsham |

| 27 July | Surrey (H); 307/8 (50 overs) | v | Glamorgan; 308/7 (48.3 overs) | Glamorgan won by 3 wickets |
| Scorecard | Surrey (H); 307/8 (50 overs) | v | Glamorgan; 308/7 (48.3 overs) | Woodbridge Road, Guildford |

| 29 July | Nottinghamshire Outlaws (H); 261/8 (50 overs) | v | Somerset; 261/8 (50 overs) | Match tied |
| Scorecard | Nottinghamshire Outlaws (H); 261/8 (50 overs) | v | Somerset; 261/8 (50 overs) | Trent Bridge, Nottingham |

| 29 July | Durham; 271/7 (50 overs) | v | Kent Spitfires (H); 274/8 (49.2 overs) | Kent Spitfires won by 2 wickets |
| Scorecard | Durham; 271/7 (50 overs) | v | Kent Spitfires (H); 274/8 (49.2 overs) | St Lawrence Ground, Canterbury |

| 29 July | Warwickshire Bears (H); 273/5 (50 overs) | v | Sussex Sharks; 155 (39.2 overs) | Warwickshire Bears won by 118 runs |
| Scorecard | Warwickshire Bears (H); 273/5 (50 overs) | v | Sussex Sharks; 155 (39.2 overs) | Edgbaston, Birmingham |

| 30 July | Glamorgan (H); 227/8 (50 overs) | v | Nottinghamshire Outlaws; 230/7 (48.3 overs) | Nottinghamshire Outlaws won by 3 wickets |
| Scorecard | Glamorgan (H); 227/8 (50 overs) | v | Nottinghamshire Outlaws; 230/7 (48.3 overs) | SWALEC Stadium, Cardiff |

| 31 July | Warwickshire Bears; 264 (49.4 overs) | v | Durham (H); 265/5 (46.1 overs) | Durham won by 5 wickets |
| Scorecard | Warwickshire Bears; 264 (49.4 overs) | v | Durham (H); 265/5 (46.1 overs) | Roseworth Terrace, Gosforth |

| 31 July | Surrey; 286/6 (50 overs) | v | Middlesex Panthers (H); 292/4 (44.5 overs) | Middlesex Panthers won by 6 wickets |
| Scorecard | Surrey; 286/6 (50 overs) | v | Middlesex Panthers (H); 292/4 (44.5 overs) | Lord's, London |

| 31 July | Kent Spitfires; 383/7 (50 overs) | v | Somerset (H); 371/8 (48 overs) | Kent Spitfires won by 2 runs (D/L method) |
| Scorecard | Kent Spitfires; 383/7 (50 overs) | v | Somerset (H); 371/8 (48 overs) | County Ground, Taunton |

| 5 August | Kent Spitfires; 314/8 (50 overs) | v | Surrey (H); 314/9 (50 overs) | Match tied |
| Scorecard | Kent Spitfires; 314/8 (50 overs) | v | Surrey (H); 314/9 (50 overs) | The Oval, London |

| 5 August | Durham; 287/8 (50 overs) | v | Sussex Sharks (H); 288/7 (48.1 overs) | Sussex Sharks won by 3 wickets |
| Scorecard | Durham; 287/8 (50 overs) | v | Sussex Sharks (H); 288/7 (48.1 overs) | County Ground, Hove |

| 5 August | Somerset; 298/5 (50 overs) | v | Warwickshire Bears (H); 181 (40.1 overs) | Somerset won by 117 runs |
| Scorecard | Somerset; 298/5 (50 overs) | v | Warwickshire Bears (H); 181 (40.1 overs) | Edgbaston, Birmingham |

| 6 August | Glamorgan; 209 (46.4 overs) | v | Kent Spitfires (H); 210/4 (43.4 overs) | Kent Spitfires won by 6 wickets |
| Scorecard | Glamorgan; 209 (46.4 overs) | v | Kent Spitfires (H); 210/4 (43.4 overs) | St Lawrence Ground, Canterbury |

| 6 August | Sussex Sharks; 289/8 (50 overs) | v | Surrey (H); 253/9 (50 overs) | Sussex Sharks won by 36 runs |
| Scorecard | Sussex Sharks; 289/8 (50 overs) | v | Surrey (H); 253/9 (50 overs) | The Oval, London |

| 7 August | Middlesex Panthers (H); 255/7 (50 overs) | v | Somerset; 258/4 (48.2 overs) | Somerset won by 6 wickets |
| Scorecard | Middlesex Panthers (H); 255/7 (50 overs) | v | Somerset; 258/4 (48.2 overs) | Lord's, London |

| 8 August | Durham; 185 (45 overs) | v | Glamorgan (H); 133 (41.1 overs) | Durham won by 52 runs |
| Scorecard | Durham; 185 (45 overs) | v | Glamorgan (H); 133 (41.1 overs) | SWALEC Stadium, Cardiff |

| 8 August | Nottinghamshire Outlaws (H); 228/7 (38 overs) | v | Kent Spitfires; 48/2 (8 overs) | No result |
| Scorecard | Nottinghamshire Outlaws (H); 228/7 (38 overs) | v | Kent Spitfires; 48/2 (8 overs) | Trent Bridge, Nottingham |

| 8 August | Sussex Sharks (H); 248/9 (50 overs) | v | Middlesex Panthers; 81/1 (18 overs) | Middlesex Panthers won by 21 runs (D/L method) |
| Scorecard | Sussex Sharks (H); 248/9 (50 overs) | v | Middlesex Panthers; 81/1 (18 overs) | County Ground, Hove |

| 10 August | Durham (H); 56/3 (14 overs) | v | Middlesex Panthers | No result |
| Scorecard | Durham (H); 56/3 (14 overs) | v | Middlesex Panthers | Riverside Ground, Chester-le-Street |

| 10 August | Nottinghamshire Outlaws (H) | v | Surrey | Match abandoned |
| Scorecard | Nottinghamshire Outlaws (H) | v | Surrey | Trent Bridge, Nottingham |

| 10 August | Somerset (H); 193/8 (33 overs) | v | Sussex Sharks; 189/3 (29 overs) | Sussex Sharks won by 7 wickets (D/L method) |
| Scorecard | Somerset (H); 193/8 (33 overs) | v | Sussex Sharks; 189/3 (29 overs) | County Ground, Taunton |

| 10 August | Warwickshire Bears (H) | v | Kent Spitfires | Match abandoned |
| Scorecard | Warwickshire Bears (H) | v | Kent Spitfires | Rugby School Ground, Rugby |

| 12 August | Nottinghamshire Outlaws; 222/9 (50 overs) | v | Durham (H); 223/4 (45.3 overs) | Durham won by 6 wickets |
| Scorecard | Nottinghamshire Outlaws; 222/9 (50 overs) | v | Durham (H); 223/4 (45.3 overs) | Riverside Ground, Chester-le-Street |

| 12 August | Glamorgan; 289/6 (47 overs) | v | Somerset (H); 207 (40 overs) | Glamorgan won by 95 runs (D/L method) |
| Scorecard | Glamorgan; 289/6 (47 overs) | v | Somerset (H); 207 (40 overs) | County Ground, Taunton |

| 12 August | Warwickshire Bears (H); 218/2 (33 overs) | v | Surrey; 153 (26.3 overs) | Warwickshire Bears won by 111 runs (D/L method) |
| Scorecard | Warwickshire Bears (H); 218/2 (33 overs) | v | Surrey; 153 (26.3 overs) | Edgbaston, Birmingham |

| 13 August | Kent Spitfires (H); 299 (49.5 overs) | v | Sussex Sharks; 183 (31.3 overs) | Kent Spitfires won by 59 runs (D/L method) |
| Scorecard | Kent Spitfires (H); 299 (49.5 overs) | v | Sussex Sharks; 183 (31.3 overs) | St Lawrence Ground, Canterbury |

| 14 August | Surrey; 189/6 (44.5 overs) | v | Durham (H); 191/5 (31.3 overs) | Durham won by 5 wickets (D/L method) |
| Scorecard | Surrey; 189/6 (44.5 overs) | v | Durham (H); 191/5 (31.3 overs) | Riverside Ground, Chester-le-Street |

| 14 August | Glamorgan (H); 225/7 (39 overs) | v | Warwickshire Bears; 90/3 (8.3 overs) | Warwickshire Bears won by 7 wickets (D/L method) |
| Scorecard | Glamorgan (H); 225/7 (39 overs) | v | Warwickshire Bears; 90/3 (8.3 overs) | St. Helen's, Swansea |

| 14 August | Nottinghamshire Outlaws; 368/2 (45 overs) | v | Middlesex Panthers (H); 80 (13.3 overs) | Nottinghamshire Outlaws won by 77 runs (D/L method) |
| Scorecard | Nottinghamshire Outlaws; 368/2 (45 overs) | v | Middlesex Panthers (H); 80 (13.3 overs) | Lord's Cricket Ground, London |

| 20 August | Kent Spitfires (H); 191 (43.1 overs) | v | Middlesex Panthers; 193/3 (43.5 overs) | Middlesex Panthers won by 7 wickets |
| Scorecard | Kent Spitfires (H); 191 (43.1 overs) | v | Middlesex Panthers; 193/3 (43.5 overs) | St Lawrence Ground, Canterbury |

| 20 August | Warwickshire Bears; 302/7 (50 overs) | v | Nottinghamshire Outlaws (H); 306/9 (50 overs) | Nottinghamshire Outlaws won by 1 wicket |
| Scorecard | Warwickshire Bears; 302/7 (50 overs) | v | Nottinghamshire Outlaws (H); 306/9 (50 overs) | Trent Bridge, Nottingham |

| 20 August | Surrey (H); 284/9 (50 overs) | v | Somerset; 267 (44.1 overs) | Surrey won by 7 runs (D/L method) |
| Scorecard | Surrey (H); 284/9 (50 overs) | v | Somerset; 267 (44.1 overs) | The Oval, London |

| 20 August | Sussex Sharks (H); 323/3 (48 overs) | v | Glamorgan; 330/3 (46.4 overs) | Glamorgan won by 7 wickets (D/L method) |
| Scorecard | Sussex Sharks (H); 323/3 (48 overs) | v | Glamorgan; 330/3 (46.4 overs) | County Ground, Hove |

== Knockout stage ==
Quarter-finals
Nottinghamshire Outlaws (H) | 313/5
Derbyshire Falcons | 228
Durham | 237
Yorkshire Vikings (H) | 206
Warwickshire Bears | 271/7
Essex Eagles (H) | 204
Kent Spitfires (H) | 242
Gloucestershire | 218

Semi-finals
Durham (H) | 353/8
Nottinghamshire Outlaws | 270
Kent Spitfires | 215/8
Warwickshire Bears (H) | 219/4

Final
Warwickshire Bears | 165
Durham | 166/7

=== Quarter-finals ===
| 26 August | Nottinghamshire Outlaws (H); 313/5 (50 overs) | v | Derbyshire Falcons; 228 (44.5 overs) | Nottinghamshire Outlaws won by 85 runs |
| 14:00 (D/N); Scorecard | Nottinghamshire Outlaws (H); 313/5 (50 overs) | v | Derbyshire Falcons; 228 (44.5 overs) | Trent Bridge, Nottingham; Umpires: Nigel Cook and Jeff Evans; Player of the match: James Taylor (Nottinghamshire) |
| 14:00 (D/N); Scorecard | James Taylor 146* (154); David Wainwright 1/35 (10 overs) | | Marcus North 67 (91); Samit Patel 4/49 (10 overs) | Trent Bridge, Nottingham; Umpires: Nigel Cook and Jeff Evans; Player of the match: James Taylor (Nottinghamshire) |
| Nottinghamshire won the toss and elected to bat | | | | Trent Bridge, Nottingham; Umpires: Nigel Cook and Jeff Evans; Player of the match: James Taylor (Nottinghamshire) |

| 28 August | Durham; 237 (48.4 overs) | v | Yorkshire Vikings (H); 206 (48.1 overs) | Durham won by 31 runs |
| 10:30; Scorecard | Durham; 237 (48.4 overs) | v | Yorkshire Vikings (H); 206 (48.1 overs) | Headingley, Leeds; Umpires: Martin Bodenham and Nigel Cowley |
| 10:30; Scorecard | Mark Stoneman 102 (120); Rich Pyrah 4/51 (9.4 overs) | | Gary Ballance 61 (89); Chris Rushworth 3/23 (7.1 overs) | Headingley, Leeds; Umpires: Martin Bodenham and Nigel Cowley |
| Yorkshire won the toss and elected to field | | | | Headingley, Leeds; Umpires: Martin Bodenham and Nigel Cowley |

| 28 August | Warwickshire Bears; 271/7 (50 overs) | v | Essex Eagles (H); 204 (43.4 overs) | Warwickshire Bears won by 67 runs |
| 14:00 (D/N); Scorecard | Warwickshire Bears; 271/7 (50 overs) | v | Essex Eagles (H); 204 (43.4 overs) | County Ground, Chelmsford; Umpires: Neil Mallender and David Millns; Player of the match: Rikki Clarke (Warwickshire) |
| 14:00 (D/N); Scorecard | Rikki Clarke 68 (84); Reece Topley 3/56 (10 overs) | | Jesse Ryder 90 (95); Oliver Hannon-Dalby 4/44 (8.4 overs) | County Ground, Chelmsford; Umpires: Neil Mallender and David Millns; Player of the match: Rikki Clarke (Warwickshire) |
| Essex won the toss and elected to field | | | | County Ground, Chelmsford; Umpires: Neil Mallender and David Millns; Player of the match: Rikki Clarke (Warwickshire) |

| 29 August | Kent Spitfires (H); 242 (48.3 overs) | v | Gloucestershire; 218 (47.3 overs) | Kent Spitfires won by 24 runs |
| 14:00 (D/N); Scorecard | Kent Spitfires (H); 242 (48.3 overs) | v | Gloucestershire; 218 (47.3 overs) | St Lawrence Ground, Canterbury; Umpires: Steve O'Shaughnessy and Peter Willey; Player of the match: Sam Billings (Kent) |
| 14:00 (D/N); Scorecard | Sam Northeast 78 (123); David Payne 5/44 (9.3 overs) | | Gareth Roderick 43 (66); Ben Harmison 3/40 (10 overs) | St Lawrence Ground, Canterbury; Umpires: Steve O'Shaughnessy and Peter Willey; Player of the match: Sam Billings (Kent) |
| Kent won the toss and elected to bat | | | | St Lawrence Ground, Canterbury; Umpires: Steve O'Shaughnessy and Peter Willey; Player of the match: Sam Billings (Kent) |

=== Semi-finals ===
| 4 September | Kent Spitfires; 215/8 (50 overs) | v | Warwickshire Bears (H); 219/4 (46.3 overs) | Warwickshire Bears won by 6 wickets |
| 14:00 (D/N); Scorecard | Kent Spitfires; 215/8 (50 overs) | v | Warwickshire Bears (H); 219/4 (46.3 overs) | Edgbaston, Birmingham; Umpires: Steve O'Shaughnessy and Tim Robinson; Player of the match: Boyd Rankin (Warwickshire) |
| 14:00 (D/N); Scorecard | Sam Billings 40* (40); Boyd Rankin 3/34 (10 overs) | | Jonathan Trott 58 (68); David Griffiths 2/29 (8 overs) | Edgbaston, Birmingham; Umpires: Steve O'Shaughnessy and Tim Robinson; Player of the match: Boyd Rankin (Warwickshire) |
| Kent won the toss and elected to bat | | | | Edgbaston, Birmingham; Umpires: Steve O'Shaughnessy and Tim Robinson; Player of the match: Boyd Rankin (Warwickshire) |

| 6 September | Durham (H); 353/8 (50 overs) | v | Nottinghamshire Outlaws; 270 (46.1 overs) | Durham won by 83 runs |
| 10:30; Scorecard | Durham (H); 353/8 (50 overs) | v | Nottinghamshire Outlaws; 270 (46.1 overs) | Riverside Ground, Chester-le-Street; Umpires: Nick Cook and Peter Hartley; Player of the match: Ben Stokes (Durham) |
| 10:30; Scorecard | Ben Stokes 164 (113); Ajmal Shahzad 3/73 (10 overs) | | James Taylor 114 (112); Gareth Breese 3/53 (10 overs) | Riverside Ground, Chester-le-Street; Umpires: Nick Cook and Peter Hartley; Player of the match: Ben Stokes (Durham) |
| Nottinghamshire won the toss and elected to field | | | | Riverside Ground, Chester-le-Street; Umpires: Nick Cook and Peter Hartley; Player of the match: Ben Stokes (Durham) |

=== Final ===
| 20 September | Warwickshire Bears; 165 (47 overs) | v | Durham; 166/7 (40.2 overs) | Durham won by 3 wickets |
| 10:30; Scorecard | Warwickshire Bears; 165 (47 overs) | v | Durham; 166/7 (40.2 overs) | Lord's, London; Umpires: Michael Gough and Peter Hartley; Player of the match: Ben Stokes (Durham) |
| 10:30; Scorecard | Varun Chopra 64 (113); Gareth Breese 3/30 (7 overs) | | Mark Stoneman 52 (52); Jeetan Patel 4/25 (10 overs) | Lord's, London; Umpires: Michael Gough and Peter Hartley; Player of the match: Ben Stokes (Durham) |
| Durham won the toss and elected to field | | | | Lord's, London; Umpires: Michael Gough and Peter Hartley; Player of the match: Ben Stokes (Durham) |

== See also ==
- ECB 40
- 2014 NatWest t20 Blast
