= England Lions cricket team in Australia in 2012–13 =

Cricket tournament

	Australia A	England Lions
- Dates: 7 February 2013 – 1 March 2013
Captains	Aaron Finch	James Taylor

LA series
- Result: Australia A won the 5-match series 4–0
Most runs	Aaron Finch (246)	James Taylor (198)
Most wickets	Alister McDermott (8)	Rikki Clarke (5)

The England Lions cricket team toured Australia from 7 February 2013 to 1 March 2013. The tour consisted of three tour matches against Victoria and five unofficial One Day Internationals (ODIs) against Australia A. Victoria won the tour matches 3-0 while Australia A defeated the England Lions 4–0.

== Squads ==
Australia A	England Lions
Aaron Finch (c) (Victoria); Tim Paine (vc) (Tasmania); Cameron Boyce (Queensland); Joe Burns (Queensland); Nathan Coulter-Nile (Western Australia); Ben Cutting (Queensland); Callum Ferguson (South Australia); John Hastings (Victoria); Josh Hazlewood (New South Wales); Shaun Marsh (Western Australia); Kane Richardson (South Australia); Adam Voges (Western Australia); Alister McDermott (Queensland)	James Taylor (c) (Nottinghamshire)*; Gary Ballance (Yorkshire); Scott Borthwick (Durham); Danny Briggs (Hampshire)**; Varun Chopra (Warwickshire); Rikki Clarke (Warwickshire)*; Matt Coles (Kent); Ben Foakes (Essex); Alex Hales (Nottinghamshire); James Harris (Middlesex)*; Simon Kerrigan (Lancashire); Stuart Meaker (Surrey)*; Craig Overton (Somerset)*; Toby Roland-Jones (Middlesex); Joe Root (Yorkshire)*; Ben Stokes (Durham); Reece Topley (Essex); James Vince (Hampshire); Chris Wright (Warwickshire)

- *On 24 January Clarke, Meaker and Overton replaced Root and Harris, with Taylor taking the captaincy from Root.
- **On 25 January Briggs was ruled out of the tour by a sprained ankle.

== Tour matches ==
=== 50 over match : Victoria v England Lions ===
7 February 2013
11:00
Scorecard

England Lions; 8/225 (50 overs)	v	Victoria; 2/227 (36.1 overs)
Gary Ballance 86 (96); Scott Boland 3/36 (10 overs)		Rob Quiney 122 (104); Craig Overton 2/30 (8 overs)

Victoria won by 8 wickets
Junction Oval, Melbourne
Umpires: Ange Sammartino (Aus) and Sam Sciacca (Aus)

- Victoria won the toss and elected to field.

=== 50 over match : Victorian XI v England Lions ===
11 February 2013
11:00
Scorecard

England Lions; 4/335 (50 overs)	v	(Victoria (state)) Victorian XI; 6/336 (49.4 overs)
Varun Chopra 115 (123); Ryan Sidebottom 2/53 (7 overs)		Ryan Carters 127 (102); Matt Coles 2/58 (10 overs)

Victorian XI won by 4 wickets
Junction Oval, Melbourne
Umpires: Ange Sammartino (Aus) and Sam Sciacca (Aus)

- Victorian XI won the toss and elected to field.

=== 50 over match : Victoria v England Lions ===
13 February 2013
10:30
Scorecard

England Lions; 173 (48.4 overs)	v	Victoria; 2/174 (37.3 overs)
Gary Ballance 57 (96); Scott Boland 4/29 (7.4 overs)		Rob Quiney 76 (87); Simon Kerrigan 1/31 (6 overs)

Victoria won by 8 wickets
Melbourne Cricket Ground, Melbourne
Umpires: Phillip Gillespie (Aus) and Richard Patterson (Aus)

- Victoria won the toss and elected to field.

== Unofficial ODI series ==
=== 1st unofficial ODI ===
16 February 2013
14:00 (D/N)
Scorecard

England Lions; 6/259 (50 overs)	v	Australia A 3/260 (49.1 overs)
Varun Chopra 105 (137); John Hastings 3/55 (10 overs)		Shaun Marsh 100* (128); Chris Wright 1/39 (10 overs)

Australia A won by 7 wickets
Bellerive Oval, Hobart
Umpires: John Ward (Aus) and Paul Wilson (Aus)
Player of the match: Shaun Marsh (Aus)

- England Lions won the toss and elected to bat.

=== 2nd unofficial ODI ===
18 February 2013
10:30
Scorecard

Australia A 7/315 (50 overs)	v	England Lions; 193 (41.3 overs)
Joe Burns 114 (136); Rikki Clarke 4/55 (8 overs)		James Taylor 79 (87); Alister McDermott 2/19 (4.3 overs)

Australia A won by 122 runs
Bellerive Oval, Hobart
Umpires: John Ward (Aus) and Paul Wilson (Aus)
Player of the match: Joe Burns (Aus)

- England Lions won the toss and elected to field.
- Joe Burns (Aus) made his debut List A century.

=== 3rd unofficial ODI ===
22 February 2013
10:30
Scorecard

Australia A 6/256 (50 overs)	v	England Lions; 143 (37 overs)
Callum Ferguson 65 (64); Simon Kerrigan 2/27 (10 overs)		James Taylor 78* (82); Alister McDermott 3/32 (7 overs)

Australia A won by 113 runs
Bellerive Oval, Hobart
Umpires: John Ward (Aus) and Paul Wilson (Aus)
Player of the match: Unknown

- England Lions won the toss and elected to field.

=== 4th unofficial ODI ===
25 February 2013
10:30
Scorecard

Australia A 8/285 (50 overs)	v	England Lions; 240 (47 overs)
Aaron Finch 109 (117); Toby Roland-Jones 3/58 (9 overs)		Gary Ballance 73* (95); Alister McDermott 3/35 (9 overs)

Australia A won by 45 runs
Sydney Cricket Ground, Sydney
Umpires: Simon Fry (Aus) and Mick Martell (Aus)
Player of the match: Unknown

- Australia A won the toss and elected to bat.

=== 5th unofficial ODI ===
1 March 2013
14:00 (D/N)
Scorecard

Australia A	v	England Lions

Match abandoned
Sydney Cricket Ground, Sydney
Umpires: Simon Fry (Aus) and John Ward (Aus)

- No toss.
- Match abandoned without a ball bowled due to rain.
