= Keith Barker (disambiguation) =

Keith Barker (born 1986) is an English first-class cricketer.

Keith Barker may also refer to:

- Keith Barker Sr. (1936–2008), Guyanese cricketer, father of the above
- Keith Barker (sailor) (born 1959), British Virgin Islands sailor
- Keith Barker (writer), Canadian playwright
