= Richard Jones (cricketer, born 1986) =

English cricketer (born 1986)

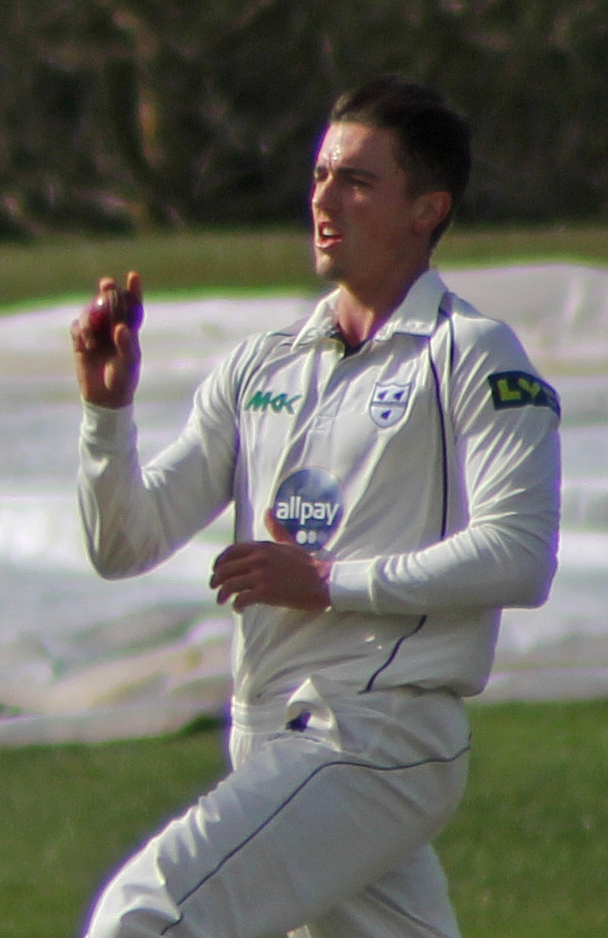

Personal information
- Full name: Richard Alan Jones
- Born: 6 November 1986 (age 40); Stourbridge, West Midlands, England
- Nickname: Jonah
- Height: 6 ft 2 in (1.88 m)
- Batting: Right-handed
- Bowling: Right-arm medium-fast
- Role: Bowler

Domestic team information
- Years: Team
- 2007–2013: Worcestershire (squad no. 25)
- 2012: Matabeleland Tuskers
- 2013: → Warwickshire (loan)
- 2014–2016: Warwickshire (squad no. 25)
- 2014, 2016: → Leicestershire (loan)
- 2017–2018: Leicestershire

Career statistics
Competition	FC	LA	T20
Matches	59	16	9
Runs scored	895	50	14
Batting average	12.26	8.33	14.00
100s/50s	0/2	0/0	0/0
Top score	62	26	9
Balls bowled	7,844	609	126
Wickets	163	7	9
Bowling average	32.63	100.71	25.55
5 wickets in innings	5	0	1
10 wickets in match	0	0	0
Best bowling	7/115	1/33	5/34
Catches/stumpings	22/–	2/–	7/–
- Source: CricketArchive, 21 July 2018

Richard Alan Jones (born 6 November 1986) is an English cricketer who plays county cricket most recently for Leicestershire.

Jones was educated at The Grange School (now Pedmore Technology College) in Stourbridge and Loughborough University. He played for Worcestershire's Second XI as early as August 2004 (when he was 17) and appeared a number of times for them in 2005 and 2006. He was included on the England Under-19 tour to Bangladesh and Sri Lanka in 2005–06.

In late April 2007, after several matches in Worcestershire's pre-season warm-up games, he made his first-class debut against Loughborough UCCE at Worcester, taking four wickets in the match.

Jones signed a loan deal with Warwickshire on 22 August 2013 for the last few weeks of the season. He was signed as cover for injured Chris Wright (cricketer) and Oliver Hannon-Dalby and also England pair Chris Woakes and Boyd Rankin. Unfortunately, Jones was injured in a net session without appearing for Warks.

Jones was released from his Worcester contract on 12 November 2013 to join Warwickshire in a one-year deal.

Soon into his Warwickshire career, Jones was loaned out to Leicestershire on a one-month deal from 13 June 2014. In his debut for Leicester he took an astonishing 5–34 in a NatWest t20 Blast game against Lancashire.
