= Jeetan Patel =

New Zealand cricketer (born 1980)

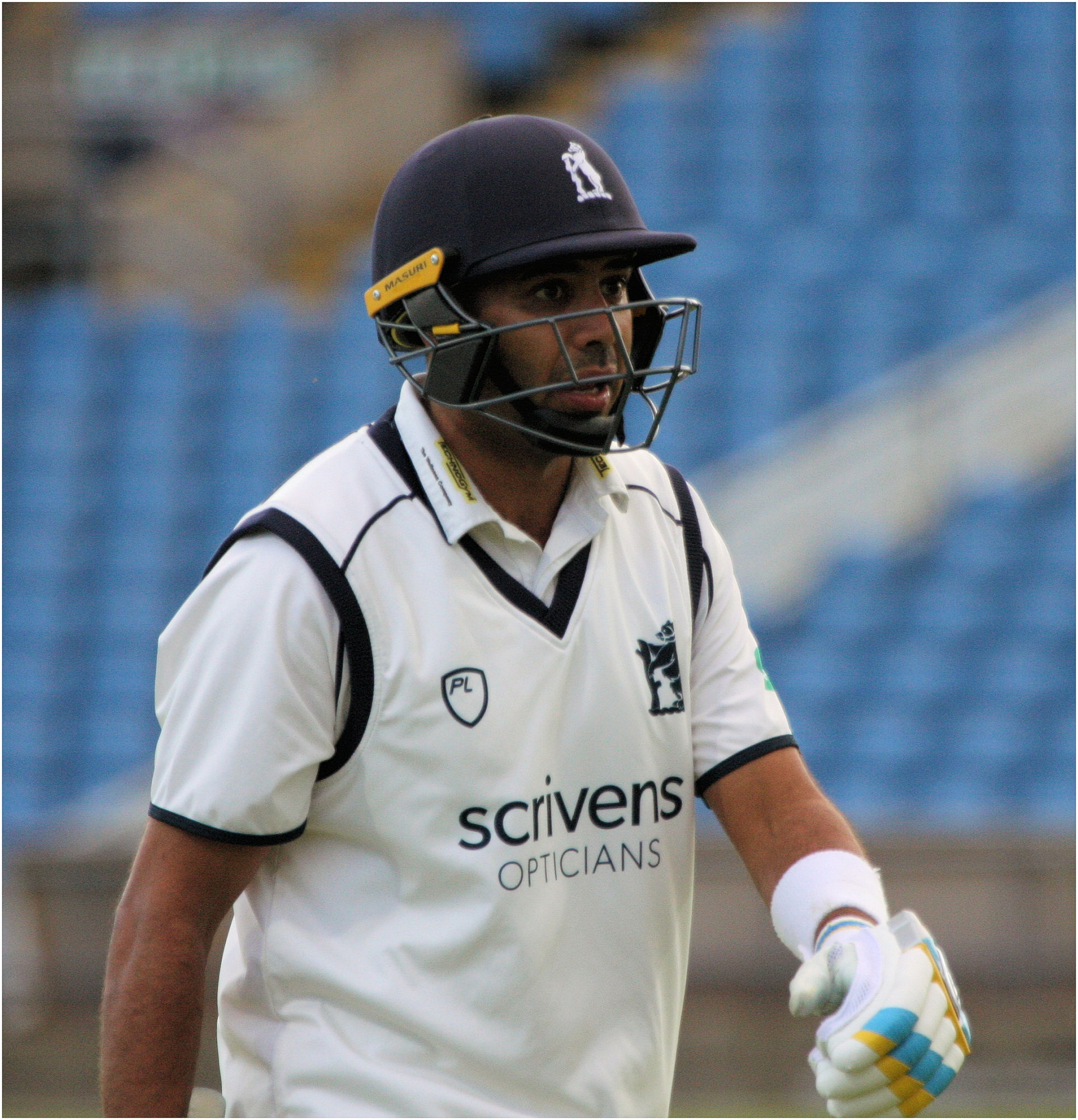
- Patel in 2017

Personal information
- Full name: Jeetan Shashi Patel
- Born: 7 May 1980 (age 46); Wellington, New Zealand
- Height: 5 ft 5 in (1.65 m)
- Batting: Right-handed
- Bowling: Right-arm off break
- Role: Bowler

International information
- National side: New Zealand (2005–2017)
- Test debut (cap 233): 27 April 2006 v South Africa
- Last Test: 25 March 2017 v South Africa
- ODI debut (cap 142): 31 August 2005 v Zimbabwe
- Last ODI: 24 May 2017 v Bangladesh
- ODI shirt no.: 39
- T20I debut (cap 16): 21 October 2005 v South Africa
- Last T20I: 28 December 2008 v West Indies
- T20I shirt no.: 39

Domestic team information
- Years: Team
- 1999–2020: Wellington
- 2009–2020: Warwickshire (squad no. 5)

Career statistics
Competition	Test	ODI	FC	LA
Matches	24	43	293	231
Runs scored	381	95	6,695	836
Batting average	12.70	13.57	21.38	9.95
100s/50s	0/0	0/0	3/28	0/1
Top score	47	34	120	50
Balls bowled	5,833	2,014	61,003	11,229
Wickets	65	49	892	288
Bowling average	47.35	34.51	32.77	30.37
5 wickets in innings	1	0	38	2
10 wickets in match	0	0	7	0
Best bowling	5/110	3/11	8/36	5/43
Catches/stumpings	13/–	13/–	156/–	96/–
- Source: ESPNcricinfo, 12 August 2020
- Patel's voice recorded April 2015

Jeetan Shashi Patel (born 7 May 1980) is a former New Zealand international cricketer. A right arm off spin bowler, he played for Wellington in New Zealand and Warwickshire in England. He is currently the spin bowling coach for the England cricket team.

From 2005 to 2013, Patel played for New Zealand in all three formats, but in 2014 he made himself unavailable for international cricket, choosing to focus on county cricket instead. He has twice been named the most valuable player by England's Professional Cricketers' Association, and in 2015 Wisden named him one of its five cricketers of the year.

He was unexpectedly brought back into the national team in 2016, replacing the injured Mark Craig during the tour to India, where he exhibited a far better batting technique. He announced his retirement from international cricket on 21 June 2017.

== Early life ==
Jeetan Patel was brought up in Wellington and has roots in Navsari, Gujarat.

== Early career ==
Patel was earmarked as a promising player early in his career. He played age group cricket in Wellington at under 15, under 17, and under 19 levels. He played for the New Zealand Cricket Academy in a one-day match against England A in 1999, and debuted for Wellington early the next year with a five wicket bag in a loss to Auckland.

== Domestic career ==
In the 2004 English Season, he represented Buckingham Town Cricket Club, making a big impact in the 1st Team as well as progressing youngsters in local development schemes. Patel became the first player in twenty years to take 50 league wickets during his spell at the Bourton Road club and first player ever to go on to play international cricket.

Back in New Zealand, Patel showed steady improvement as a bowler during the 2004–05 season, taking 26 first class wickets at an average of 32.84. He played two one-dayers against South Africa A on the 2004–05 New Zealand A tour of South Africa, represented the North Island in the 2004–05 State of Origin match, and played for the New Zealand Academy in the 2005 Cricket Australia Emerging Players Tournament.

Later in the season he toured Sri Lanka with New Zealand A, playing in a Triangular A Team Tournament.

In June 2018, he was awarded a contract with Wellington for the 2018–19 season. He was the joint-leading wicket-taker for Wellington in the 2018–19 Super Smash, with eleven dismissals in nine matches.

== International career ==
Patel was a member of the 2005 New Zealand tour of Zimbabwe, making his debut as a supersub for New Zealand in the fourth ODI. Under the experimental rules at the time, that meant Patel was a full member of the team despite not batting in the XI that scored 238 (all out) in the first innings. He replaced Craig McMillan for Zimbabwe's innings and took 1/47.

He returned to the New Zealand squad for the short-form leg of its 2005 tour of South Africa. Making his international Twenty20 debut, he was named Man of the Match, taking 3/20 off 4 overs. He played as a supersub in the first ODI against the Proteas, returning figures of 2/48 off 8.

Patel's first home international was the fourth ODI of Sri Lanka's 2005–06 tour of New Zealand, in which he was named Man of the Match. Playing as a supersub, his figures of 2/23 off 10 were the most economical in the match.

His Test debut came against South Africa in the second Test of New Zealand's 2006 tour of South Africa. New Zealand's coach John Bracewell described him as a "long term investment". Although a regular member of New Zealand's Test squad following his debut, Patel didn't make the XI for another match until 2008. Daniel Vettori was captain and first-choice spinner at the time, and the selectors typically declined to choose two spinners.

=== Rising through ranks ===
Patel was a regular member of the ODI and Twenty20 sides, though, and 2007 was his busiest year of international cricket, with 20 appearances. By the end of 2008, his New Zealand career had peaked. That year he made 13 international appearances and toured Australia with New Zealand A. His last Twenty20 match for New Zealand was on 28 December 2008 against the West Indies. He never played for his country as regularly again.

Patel also holds the joint record for taking the most catches (2) by a substitute fielder in a T20I innings (along with Jonathan Carter, Eoin Morgan, Hashim Amla, Johnson Charles and Chamu Chibhabha). He was the first substitute fielder to take 2 catches in a single T20I in 2007.

=== Comeback ===
His return was credited to several factors – most obviously his good season with Warwickshire (after 11 matches he'd taken 38 wickets) and an injury to Daniel Vettori, but also what the New Zealand Herald called "the dearth of decent spinners on the first-class scene in New Zealand". He was selected ahead of second spinner Tarun Nethula for both test losses, taking seven wickets in the series.

Patel remained a member of the team for two tests in Sri Lanka in November (4 wickets, 37 runs), and two in South Africa in January 2013 (1 wicket, 13 runs). His final test appearance was in Port Elizabeth.

The New Zealand team's tour to India in 2016 saw Mark Craig, one of three frontline spinners in the squad, injured in the first test. Patel, who according to captain Kane Williamson "wasn't initially" considered by the selectors for the tour, was named as Craig's replacement. With only one test remaining in the tour, Patel called it "a moment that could be my last one". Patel's recall also coincided with Williamson's omission from the playing side due to being stricken with fever. On 31 December 2016, Patel and Matt Henry were named as a replacements for Trent Boult and Lockie Ferguson.

In 2017, Patel along with Mitchell Santner shared the honour for becoming the first pair of spinners to kick off an ODI by opening the bowling (start an ODI), when they opened the bowling in the first innings of the 4th ODI v South Africa. This was the first instance happened only in the ODI history.

In April 2017, Patel was announced in New Zealand's squad for the 2017 Champions Trophy.

== County cricket ==
In 2009, Patel joined English county cricket side Warwickshire. On debut against Yorkshire he scored 120, his maiden first-class century and a record for a Warwickshire number 10, and shared a ninth wicket partnership of 200 with Jonathan Trott. He played his last ODI in October 2009, against Australia (ten more test appearances were to come).

In 2010 Patel played three tests against different opponents, averaging 72 (bowling) and 12 (batting). He returned to Warwickshire briefly and successfully in 2011. Against Sussex in July, he took 10/163, his first 10-wicket bag in first class cricket. In his only test of 2011 he took 0/142 against Zimbabwe.

In 2012 Patel's extended run of county cricket contributed significantly to Warwickshire's 2012 County Championship with both ball and, at times, bat. In August he was recalled into the New Zealand test team for its 2012 two Test tour of India, having played only one test in the previous 21 months.

=== Retirement consideration & County season ===
Patel continued to build on his success with Warwickshire through 2013 (52 first class wickets at 30.01) and 2014 (59 at 26.32), and he remained a regular player for Wellington as well. Over those two English summers and the New Zealand season in between them, his first class batting average was 31.7. He declined a recall to the New Zealand team for its tour of the West Indies in April 2014, prioritising his county contract with Warwickshire.

His 2014 county season was his most celebrated, being the only player to take over 100 wickets (across all formats) and winning the MVP award from the Professional Cricketers' Association. He topped the bowling averages in both the Royal London One-Day Cup (23 wickets at 17) and the NatWest t20 Blast (25 wickets at 13). He ended 2014 with a total of 185 first class wickets for Warwickshire, at an average of 27.12. Following this Warwickshire announced a new two-year deal with Patel. In 2015 Patel was named as one of five Wisden Cricketers of the Year for 2014.

In September 2015 Patel again took topped 50 wickets in the County Championship season, for the fourth successive year. He finished seventh on the competition's list of wicket-takers with 58 wickets at 25.27, and was named in the Professional Cricketers' Association Team of the Year. The next year he topped the wicket-takers' list in County cricket with 69, and was named the season's Most Valuable Player by the Professional Cricketers' Association.

=== Coaching career ===
Patel works as the spin bowling coach for England.
