= Nigel Cook =

English cricketer (born 1954)

Personal information
- Full name: Nigel Dennis Cook
- Born: 10 May 1954 (age 72); Swanton Morley, Norfolk, England
- Batting: Right-handed

Domestic team information
- Years: Team
- 1971–1988: Norfolk

Career statistics
Competition	List A
Matches	3
Runs scored	61
Batting average	30.50
100s/50s	–/–
Top score	31*
Balls bowled	–
Wickets	–
Bowling average	–
5 wickets in innings	–
10 wickets in match	–
Best bowling	–
Catches/stumpings	–/–
- Source: Cricinfo, 29 June 2011

Nigel Dennis Cook (born 10 May 1954) is a former English cricketer. Cook was a right-handed batsman. He was born in Swanton Morley, Norfolk.

Cook made his debut for Norfolk in the 1971 Minor Counties Championship against Buckinghamshire. Cook played Minor counties cricket for Norfolk from 1971 to 1988, which included 66 Minor Counties Championship matches and 2 MCCA Knockout Trophy matches. He made his List A debut against Leicestershire in the 1982 NatWest Trophy. He made 2 further List A appearances, against Glamorgan in the 1983 NatWest Trophy and Leicestershire in the 1985 NatWest Trophy. In his 3 List A matches, he scored 61 runs at an average of 30.50, with a high score of 31 not out.
