= Keith Barker Sr. =

Guyanese cricketer (1936–2008)

Keith Barker
Personal information
- Full name: Keith Henderson Barker
- Born: 12 July 1936; Saint Philip, Barbados
- Died: 30 March 2008 (aged 71); Blackburn, England
- Source: Cricinfo, 19 November 2020

Keith Barker (12 July 1936 – 30 March 2008) was a Guyanese cricketer. He played in two first-class matches for British Guiana in 1960/61 and 1963/64. His son, also named Keith Barker, plays county cricket in England, where he has additionally been a professional footballer.

== See also ==
- List of Guyanese representative cricketers
