= Tim Ambrose =

Australian-born English cricketer

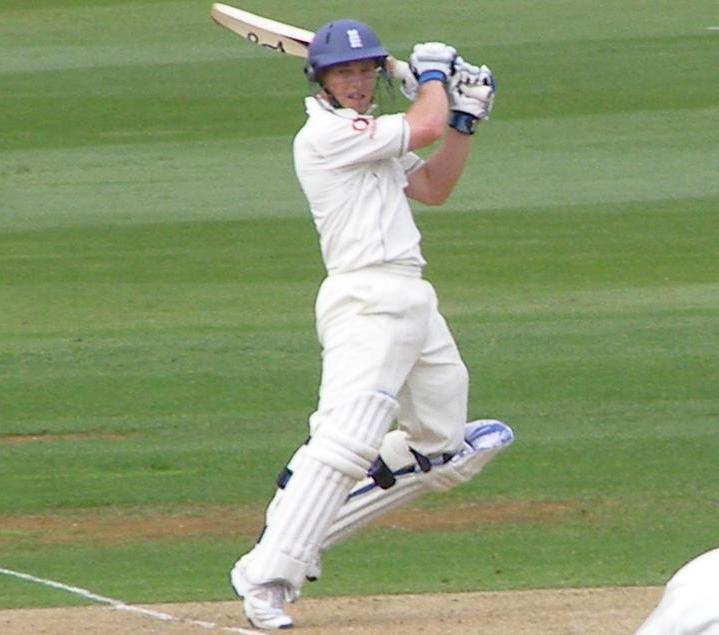

Personal information
- Full name: Timothy Raymond Ambrose
- Born: 1 December 1982 (age 43); Newcastle, New South Wales, Australia
- Nickname: Freak, Timbo, Tiny Tim
- Height: 5 ft 7 in (1.70 m)
- Batting: Right-handed
- Role: Wicket-keeper

International information
- National side: England (2008–2009)
- Test debut (cap 639): 5 March 2008 v New Zealand
- Last Test: 26 February 2009 v West Indies
- ODI debut (cap 206): 15 June 2008 v New Zealand
- Last ODI: 28 June 2008 v New Zealand
- ODI shirt no.: 12
- Only T20I (cap 38): 13 June 2008 v New Zealand

Domestic team information
- Years: Team
- 2001–2005: Sussex
- 2006–2019: Warwickshire (squad no. 12)

Career statistics
Competition	Test	ODI	FC	LA
Matches	11	5	251	182
Runs scored	447	10	11,349	4,145
Batting average	29.80	2.50	32.51	32.38
100s/50s	1/3	0/0	18/65	3/25
Top score	102	6	251*	135
Catches/stumpings	31/0	3/0	678/43	172/34
- Source: ESPNcricinfo, 30 September 2019
- Ambrose's voice recorded April 2015

Timothy Raymond Ambrose (born 1 December 1982) is a retired Australian-born English cricketer who played all three formats of the game internationally. He was a right-handed batsman and wicket-keeper. He began his domestic career with Sussex County Cricket Club in 2000, although he went on to play for Warwickshire. He represented England but lost his place to Matt Prior in 2009. Ambrose retired from cricket at the end of the 2020 season.

== Domestic career ==
His first notable cricketing performance was in the Second XI Championship in 2000, when he played two games in the season. He soon established himself in the first-class team, having helped Sussex out of the Second Division and helping them stay in the First Division ever since. Since 2003, Ambrose has played Twenty20 cricket. Ambrose transferred to Warwickshire in 2006. His highest first-class score, achieved in May 2007, was an innings of 251 not out, against Worcestershire.

Ambrose formed half of Warwickshire's record fifth wicket partnership when he and Jim Troughton added 335 against Hampshire, at Birmingham, on 24 April 2009. With Laurie Evans, he also set a new Warwickshire record for a sixth wicket partnership on 1 July 2015: the pair added 327 against Ambrose's former county Sussex in the County Championship, also at Birmingham. Having held the previous county record for a sixth wicket partnership, 226 with Heath Streak against Worcestershire at New Road in 2007, Ambrose continues to be the only man to have featured in two current record partnerships for Warwickshire in first class cricket (Ian Bell has done so for Warwickshire in the 20 over format).

== International career ==
In January 2008 Ambrose was selected for both the One-Day International and Test squads for the England tour of New Zealand.

On 5 March 2008 he made his Test debut against New Zealand after not being selected to play in the One-Day International series. Ambrose began his career brightly, making a fifty on debut against New Zealand in the first Test and keeping cleanly throughout the match.

In his second test, he made his maiden Test century, scoring an attacking 102 against New Zealand in Wellington and was named man of the match. He batted and kept adequately for the rest of the series, and was retained for the three match tour of England by New Zealand later that year, however began his series with a duck at Lord's followed by a score of three. In the third Test, however, Ambrose scored a valuable 67 in partnership with Kevin Pietersen's 115 and Stuart Broad's five before being caught behind.

Ambrose made his ODI debut on 15 June 2008 against New Zealand but struggled throughout the five-match series (which England lost 3–1), scoring just ten runs in five innings and notably dropping a relatively simple catch at Lord's.

Ambrose was retained as wicket-keeper for the 2008 series against South Africa. He had a poor series, and was once hit in the mouth by a bouncer from Steve Harmison. Poor scores led Ambrose to be dropped and replaced by Matt Prior for the One Day International series against South Africa. Ambrose bats in the later middle order, in general, at number 7, as most wicket-keepers do, despite being moved to number 8 in the Edgbaston Test against South Africa in the summer of 2008, and up to no.6 in the same series at Headingley. Ambrose's batting provides a safety net for any remaining higher order batsmen, as well as for the tail-end. Ambrose managed an impressive 36 runs off 94 deliveries in the second innings of the second npower Test against the Proteas, considering England were all out for 203. Then, in the 3rd test, Ambrose managed a safe 22 runs from 59 balls in the 1st innings, before staying in for over two hours in the 2nd innings, hitting just 19 runs from 80 deliveries.
