= Ian Westwood =

English cricketer (born 1982)

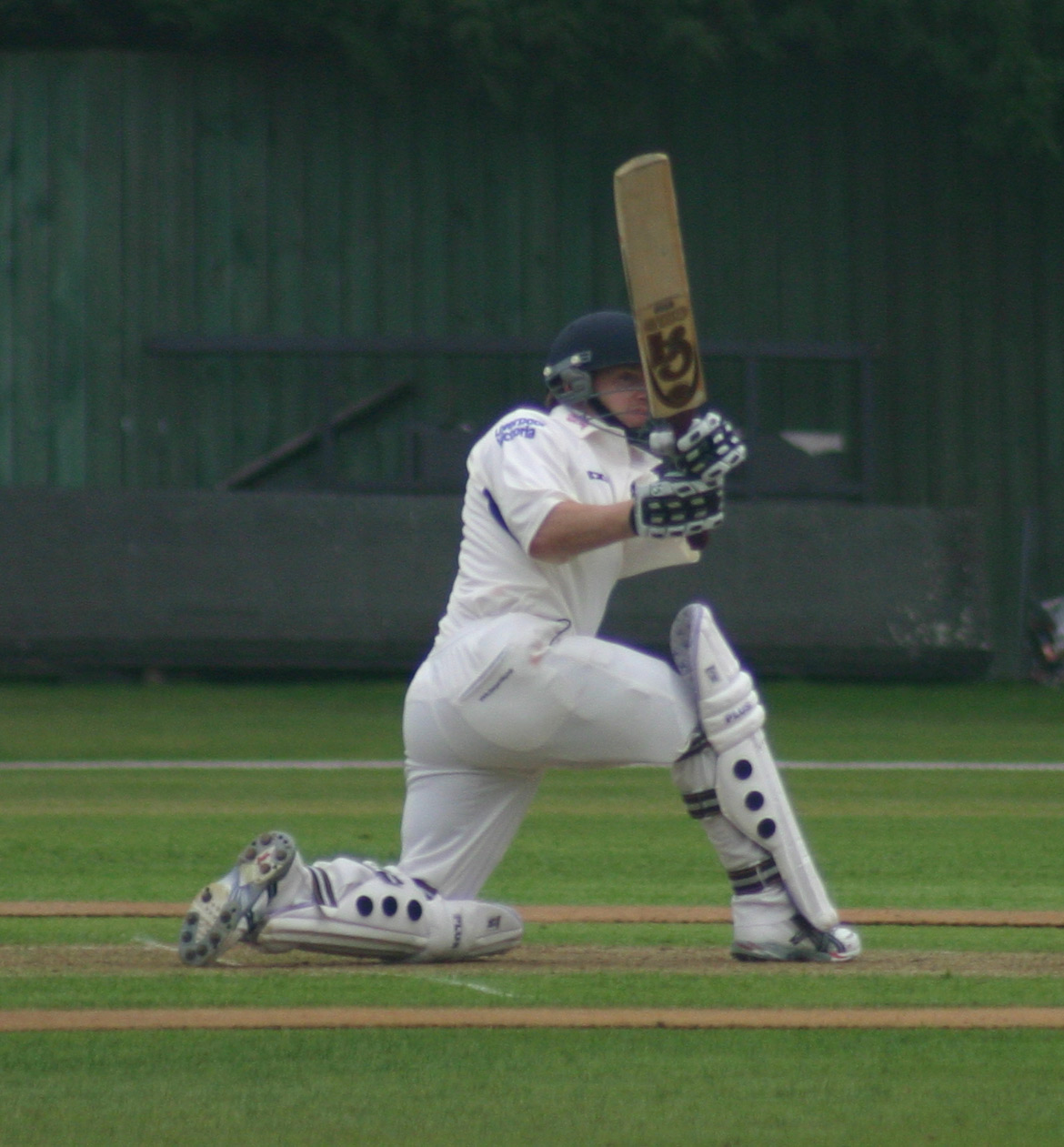
- Ian Westwood sweeps to bring up his century against Cambridge UCCE, April 2005

Personal information
- Full name: Ian James Westwood
- Born: 13 July 1982 (age 44); Birmingham, England
- Height: 5 ft 7 in (1.70 m)
- Batting: Left-handed
- Bowling: Right-arm off break
- Role: Batsman

Domestic team information
- Years: Team
- 1999–2002: Warwickshire Cricket Board
- 2003–2017: Warwickshire (squad no. 22)
- FC debut: 30 June 2003 Warwickshire v India A
- LA debut: 15 May 2001 Warwickshire Cricket Board v Leicestershire Cricket Board

Career statistics
Competition	FC	LA	T20
Matches	159	60	38
Runs scored	8,077	940	342
Batting average	33.10	22.92	22.80
100s/50s	16/42	0/3	0/0
Top score	196	65	49*
Balls bowled	604	264	91
Wickets	7	3	5
Bowling average	48.14	75.66	18.20
5 wickets in innings	0	0	0
10 wickets in match	0	0	0
Best bowling	2/39	1/28	3/29
Catches/stumpings	83/–	7/–	5/–
- Source: CricketArchive, 23 June 2017
- Westwood's voice recorded April 2015

Ian James Westwood (born 13 July 1982) is a former English cricketer who played for Warwickshire County Cricket Club. He retired from cricket in June 2017. Westwood is the club's current head coach.

== Career ==
Westwood made his senior debut for Warwickshire in a friendly List A match in 2001. It wasn't until 2003 until he made his first-class debut. For the next two seasons he was in and out of the side but cemented his place at the end of the 2005 season with some consistent performances. The 2006 season brought Westwood his maiden first-class 100.

In November 2008, Westwood was appointed Warwickshire captain in succession to Darren Maddy.

On 27 June 2017, Westwood announced his retirement from cricket.

He was appointed Warwickshire head coach in February 2025.
