= Peter McKay (cricketer) =

English cricketer

Personal information
- Full name: Peter John McKay
- Born: 12 October 1994 (age 32); Burton-upon-Trent, Staffordshire, England
- Batting: Left-handed
- Role: Wicket-keeper

Domestic team information
- Years: Team
- 2013–2015: Warwickshire (squad no. 18)
- FC debut: 5 April 2013 Warwickshire v Oxford MCCU
- LA debut: 6 May 2013 Warwickshire v Kent

Career statistics
Competition	FC	LA	T20
Matches	5	6	12
Runs scored	97	48	3
Batting average	12.12	24.00	3.00
100s/50s	0/0	0/0	0/0
Top score	33	22*	2*
Catches/stumpings	8/1	5/1	6/2
- Source: CricketArchive, 5 May 2015

Peter John McKay (born 12 October 1994 in Burton-upon-Trent) is an English cricketer who played for Warwickshire between 2013 and 2015. He is a left-handed batsman who also plays as a wicket-keeper. McKay made his first-class debut for Warwickshire against Oxford MCCU in April 2013.
