= Varun Chopra =

English cricketer

Personal information
- Full name: Varun Chopra
- Born: 21 June 1987 (age 39); Barking, London, England
- Nickname: Tidz
- Height: 6 ft 1 in (1.85 m)
- Batting: Right-handed
- Bowling: Right arm off break

Domestic team information
- Years: Team
- 2005–2009: Essex
- 2010–2016: Warwickshire (squad no. 3)
- 2016–2021: Essex (squad no. 6)
- 2019: → Sussex (on loan) (squad no. 2)
- 2021: → Middlesex (on loan)
- FC debut: 15 April 2006 Essex v Loughborough UCCE
- LA debut: 9 June 2006 Essex v Sri Lankans

Career statistics
Competition	FC	LA	T20
Matches	192	117	116
Runs scored	10,243	4,844	2,908
Batting average	34.48	45.27	29.08
100s/50s	20/50	12/28	2/20
Top score	233*	160	116
Balls bowled	204	18	–
Wickets	0	0	–
Bowling average	–	–	–
5 wickets in innings	–	–	–
10 wickets in match	–	–	–
Best bowling	–	–	–
Catches/stumpings	228/–	42/–	25/–
- Source: Cricinfo, 25 September 2021
- Chopra's voice recorded April 2015

Varun Chopra (born 21 June 1987) is an English former cricketer who captained the English U-19 cricket team in series against Sri Lanka in 2005 and India in 2006. Chopra attended Ilford County High School and played for Ilford Cricket Club. In September 2021, Chopra announced his retirement from cricket.

== Biography ==
He played for Essex, and made his debut for the senior side in 2006, making 106 in a drawn game against Gloucestershire, becoming the youngest player to score a century for Essex in county cricket.

Varun Chopra emerged from Essex, a county that has produced several international players, including former England captain Alastair Cook. He is an opening batsman and captained England Under-19s, leading the team to a series whitewash against Sri Lanka in 2005. He averaged 48 in the Test matches and scored a half-century in one of the two One Day Internationals. This was followed by an 11–0 defeat on the winter tour of Bangladesh.

Varun Chopra joined the Willetton Dragons cricket club in the 2006/07 season to play first grade in Western Australia.

Chopra's domestic season started off well in 2006 – he struck a hundred and a fifty on Championship debut and has been slowly making his mark in the first team, even keeping Grant Flower out of the side.

Chopra joined Warwickshire for the start of the 2010 season. In 2011 he became the first Warwickshire batsman to score double tons in back to back county matches.

After seven, largely successful seasons at Warwickshire, he returned to Essex during the 2016 season. In 2017 and 2018 he played in the championship only when Alastair Cook was not available, as Nick Browne took the other opener position, but in limited-overs games he was first choice. In 2019 he had spectacular run in the London One-Day Cup scoring 3 centuries and averaging 84 , but Essex did not qualify for the play-offs.

Chopra was part of the England Lions' tour of Australia in 2013, and made a century against Australia A.

In July 2019, he was selected to play for the Amsterdam Knights in the inaugural edition of the Euro T20 Slam cricket tournament. However, the following month the tournament was cancelled.

Chopra joined Middlesex on loan in July 2021, primarily to play in the Royal London Cup.
