= Mark Stoneman =

English cricketer

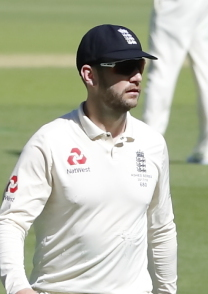
- Stoneman in November 2017

Personal information
- Full name: Mark Daniel Stoneman
- Born: 26 June 1987 (age 39); Newcastle upon Tyne, Tyne and Wear, England
- Height: 5 ft 10 in (1.78 m)
- Batting: Left-handed
- Bowling: Right-arm off break
- Role: Opening batsman

International information
- National side: England (2017–2018)
- Test debut (cap 680): 17 August 2017 v West Indies
- Last Test: 24 May 2018 v Pakistan

Domestic team information
- Years: Team
- 2007–2016: Durham (squad no. 23)
- 2017–2021: Surrey (squad no. 23)
- 2021: → Yorkshire (on loan) (squad no. 58)
- 2021: → Middlesex (on loan) (squad no. 11)
- 2022–2024: Middlesex (squad no. 11)
- 2025: Hampshire (squad no. 88)

Career statistics
Competition	Test	FC	LA	T20
Matches	11	257	113	79
Runs scored	526	14,707	3,809	1,348
Batting average	27.68	33.88	38.09	19.82
100s/50s	0/5	31/74	7/23	0/8
Top score	60	197	144*	89*
Balls bowled	–	467	22	–
Wickets	–	1	1	–
Bowling average	–	354.00	41.00	–
5 wickets in innings	–	0	0	–
10 wickets in match	–	0	0	–
Best bowling	–	1/34	1/8	–
Catches/stumpings	1/–	108/–	35/–	31/–
- Source: ESPNcricinfo, 25 May 2025

Mark Daniel Stoneman (born 26 June 1987) is an English cricketer who plays for Hampshire County Cricket Club and has previously played for England. He made his international debut for England in August 2017. He bats left handed and normally plays as an opening batsman.

== Early life and domestic career ==
Stoneman attended Marley Hill County Primary School, followed by Whickham School. He joined Durham in 2005 and played two seasons in the second eleven, before making his first team debut against Sussex in July 2007.

Stoneman scored 50 in his second match, against Hampshire and his maiden first-class century, 101, in a victory over Sussex in September 2007.

On 26 July 2016, Stoneman signed for Surrey ahead of the 2017 season. In July 2018, Stoneman reached the milestone of 10,000 first-class runs.

In August 2021, Stoneman joined Middlesex, initially on loan for the remainder of that year's county championship season, and then signing a three-year contract.

He left Middlesex at the end of the 2024 season and joined Hampshire on a one-year red-ball contract in February 2025.

== International career ==
Stoneman played for England in the 2006 U-19 Cricket World Cup in Sri Lanka. In August 2017, he was named in England's Test squad for their series against the West Indies, to replace Keaton Jennings as opening partner to Alastair Cook. He made his Test debut in the first match of the series on 17 August 2017. He is the first England cricketer to make his debut in a Day-Night Test match. He kept his place in the team for the 2017-18 Ashes Series and made his Ashes debut in the opening Test match in Brisbane on 23 November 2017, partnering Cook and made 53 in the first innings before being dismissed by Pat Cummins.
