= Keith Barker =

English cricketer (born 1986)

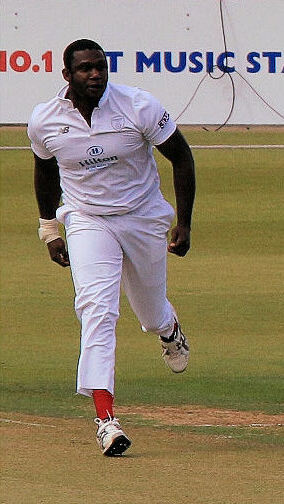
- Barker in 2022
- Born: Keith Hubert Douglas Barker; 21 October 1986 (age 40); Manchester, England
- Occupations: Footballer, cricketer
- Relatives: Keith Barker senior (father)
- Cricket career

Cricket information
- Batting: Left-handed
- Bowling: Left-arm medium

Domestic team information
- Years: Team
- 2009–2018: Warwickshire (squad no. 13)
- 2019–2025: Hampshire (squad no. 13)
- 2026: Warwickshire (squad no. 13)

Career statistics
Competition	FC	LA	T20
Matches	171	73	65
Runs scored	5,554	639	383
Batting average	28.33	18.79	13.67
100s/50s	6/26	0/1	0/0
Top score	125	56	46
Balls bowled	28,428	2,930	1,206
Wickets	544	89	69
Bowling average	25.00	30.70	23.01
5 wickets in innings	23	0	0
10 wickets in match	1	0	0
Best bowling	7/46	4/33	4/19
Catches/stumpings	41/–	15/–	17/–
- Source: ESPNcricinfo, 18 August 2026
Association football career
- Position: Striker
Youth career
- Blackburn Rovers
Senior career*
Years	Team	Apps	(Gls)
2005–2007	Blackburn Rovers	0	(0)
2006	→ Cercle Brugge (loan)	0	(0)
2007	→ Rochdale (loan)	12	(0)
2007	St Patrick's Athletic	7	(3)
2008	Northwich Victoria	4	(0)
International career
2005	England U19	1	(0)
- * Club domestic league appearances and goals

Keith Hubert Douglas Barker (born 21 October 1986) is an English former first-class cricketer who played as an all-rounder for Warwickshire and Hampshire. He previously played professional football, where he was a striker. He came through the academy of Premier League club Blackburn Rovers, from whom he was loaned to Cercle Brugge and Rochdale. He subsequently had short spells at St Patrick's Athletic and Northwich Victoria before moving into cricket.

== Early life and football ==
Barker was born in Manchester to Caribbean parents. His father Keith Barker, Sr. played cricket for British Guiana and came over to Britain to be overseas professional for Lancashire league side Enfield Cricket Club in 1965. Barker's godfather is former West Indies captain Clive Lloyd. Barker also played for Enfield and was offered a contract by Lancashire, but he decided to play football with Blackburn Rovers.

In the 2004–05 academy season, Barker scored 17 goals in 27 appearances, making him the under-18 top scorer, as Rovers won the national academy play-offs. He also scored four times in seven Premier Reserve League North appearances. In 2005–06 he scored 4 times in 11 appearances for the reserves, before being loaned to Belgian feeder club Cercle Brugge in January 2006. He never appeared for their first team.

On 31 August 2006 Barker joined League Two side Rochdale on a three-month loan. He made his professional debut two days later, playing the full 90 minutes in their 1–1 draw with Hereford United at Spotland. He scored one goal for the club in 16 appearances, equalising in a Football League Trophy tie away to Crewe Alexandra on 31 October which finished 1–1, with the hosts winning in a penalty shootout.

Barker joined Irish club St Patrick's Athletic in the summer of 2007 after being released by Blackburn, though his five months there were mostly spent off with injury. On 3 January 2008 he joined Conference National side Northwich Victoria on a free transfer. He made four appearances for the club, all as a substitute.

=== International career ===
Barker made one appearance for England under 19s against Belgium on 9 February 2005 in a 1–1 draw.

== Cricket ==
Barker continued to play for Enfield, where he was spotted by former England coach David Lloyd, whose son plays for Accrington. On Lloyd's recommendation he was watched by Warwickshire second team coach Keith Piper, and subsequently offered a trial. In August 2008 he was signed on a contract until 2010, after impressing in the second team.

On 19 April 2009 Barker made his List A debut for Warwickshire against Somerset at Edgbaston. Batting at number 8, he made 28 runs before being bowled by Peter Trego. He then took the wicket of James Hildreth, finishing with figures of 1-47 as Warwickshire lost by 8 wickets. In 2012, he formed an unexpectedly potent opening attack with Chris Wright that played a key part in Warwickshire winning the County Championship with a game to spare. Barker is eligible for England and the West Indies, as his father was born in Barbados.

On 26 September 2018, Barker signed for Hampshire on a two-year deal from 2019 onwards, taking 37 Championship wickets in his first season, before extending his contract further on 15 January 2020. In August 2020, in the opening round of fixtures in the 2020 Bob Willis Trophy, Barker took his 400th first-class wicket.

Barker rejoined Warwickshire for the 2026 season. He announced his retirement from professional cricket on 18 August 2026, ending his career having taken 544 wickets and scored 5,554 runs in first class matches.

== Anti-doping suspension ==
In April 2025, it was revealed that Barker had been given a 12-month suspension for breaching England and Wales Cricket Board anti-doping rules. UK Anti-Doping said he had returned a positive urine test for the diuretic drug Indapamide leading to him being provisionally suspended in July 2024. At a hearing in March 2025, Barker admitted two charges but the panel which heard his case accepted he had been legitimately prescribed the medication by his doctor to treat high blood pressure and he was not informed it was on the World Anti-Doping Agency prohibited substance list. They also ruled he had "no intention to breach the anti-doping rules." Barker's ban was backdated to when his provisional suspension began and he is eligible to return to cricket from 4 July 2025.
