= Rikki Clarke =

English cricketer (born 1981)

Personal information
- Full name: Rikki Clarke
- Born: 29 September 1981 (age 45); Orsett, Essex, England
- Nickname: Clarkey, Crouchy
- Height: 6 ft 4 in (1.93 m)
- Batting: Right-handed
- Bowling: Right-arm fast-medium
- Role: All-rounder

International information
- National side: England (2003–2006)
- Test debut (cap 620): 21 October 2003 v Bangladesh
- Last Test: 1 November 2003 v Bangladesh
- ODI debut (cap 174): 17 June 2003 v Pakistan
- Last ODI: 5 September 2006 v Pakistan
- ODI shirt no.: 20

Domestic team information
- Years: Team
- 2002–2007: Surrey (squad no. 9)
- 2008: Derbyshire
- 2009–2017: Warwickshire (squad no. 81)
- 2017: → Surrey (on loan)
- 2018–2021: Surrey (squad no. 81)

Career statistics
Competition	Test	ODI	FC	LA
Matches	2	20	267	241
Runs scored	96	144	11,387	4,252
Batting average	32.00	11.07	32.16	25.46
100s/50s	0/1	0/0	17/58	0/22
Top score	55	39	214	98*
Balls bowled	174	469	29,950	6,786
Wickets	4	11	534	158
Bowling average	15.00	37.72	30.51	38.50
5 wickets in innings	0	0	8	1
10 wickets in match	0	0	0	0
Best bowling	2/7	2/28	7/55	5/26
Catches/stumpings	1/–	11/–	391/–	110/–
- Source: ESPNcricinfo, 25 September 2021
- Clarke's voice recorded April 2015

Rikki Clarke (born 29 September 1981) is a retired English cricketer, who last played for Surrey. He was educated at Broadwater School and then Godalming College. Clarke began his career as a professional cricketer with Surrey in 2000, making his list A debut in 2001 and First Class debut in 2002, and the following year made his One Day International debut for England; later in 2003 he played his first Test match. Between 2003 and 2006 he played two Tests, both against Bangladesh and 20 ODIs.

At the end of 2007 Clarke left Surrey to become Derbyshire's club captain after feeling a change was needed, hoping he could impress the England selectors with his leadership. Before the end of the 2008 season he stepped down as captain because the job was negatively affecting his own performance, and after a single year at the club he left to join Warwickshire for the start of the 2009 season, before rejoining Surrey in 2017.

He was a right handed-batsman and right arm fast-medium bowler, and usually fielded at slip.

== Domestic career ==
=== Surrey ===
After some fine performances in Surrey's championship-winning Second XI team in 2001, Clarke quickly established himself in the first team the following season. He made an unbeaten 107 against Cambridge UCCE in his debut first-class innings and also scored 153 not out against Somerset, ending the season 711 runs at an average of over 50. He was awarded the Cricket Writers' Club's Young Cricketer of the Year award and the NBC Denis Compton Award for his achievements in 2002.

His domestic form suffered in 2004 as he could manage a first-class batting average of only 31.17 and just nine wickets all season. His one-day performances were even worse, as he passed fifty just once in 11 innings. In a 50 overs a side match played on 29 April Clarke hit 82 runs off only 28 balls. It included 9 Fours and 6 Sixes. It helped Surrey get to 494–5 against Gloucestershire.

In 2006 Clarke was made the club's vice-captain, with the aim of giving him some experience of leadership to prepare him to take over the captaincy from Mark Butcher, and later that year he led Surrey in the Twenty20 Cup. In May the England Cricket Board named a 25-man development squad for international players and those considered close to playing for England; Clarke was included in the squad for the first time. Despite his inclusion he was overlooked by England during the summer while players from outside the squad were drafted in to play for England's struggling ODI side. In the 2007 season, Clarke played only ten first-class matches for Surrey, scoring 301 runs and taking 15 wickets.

=== Derbyshire ===
In October 2007, it was announced Clarke had signed for second division Derbyshire as captain for the 2008 season, after having attracted offers from a number of clubs. The move came after Clarke turned down a two-year extension with Surrey with him feeling a change was needed. Clarke said of the move:

[Derbyshire] is looking to go forward and that really excited me. The chance to be captain played a part in my decision because I have always wanted to be a leader but I was more interested in where Derbyshire want to go. I am looking at this as a long-term move. I was at Surrey since I was a young lad and it's always difficult to leave but I felt I needed a fresh start. I could have gone to other counties that are regarded as bigger but I see this as one of the best career moves I have made.

— Rikki Clarke, October 2007

Clarke hoped that the move to Derbyshire would improve his chance of being selected for England. Despite Clarke's high hopes, he experienced a poor run of form in the 2008 season that led to him quitting the captaincy. When he made his decision, he was averaging 21 with the bat and 38 with the ball from eight first-class matches. The only first-class half century of his tenure as captain was a score of 81 against Warwickshire in May. At one point, his form was so bad that he dropped himself.

=== Warwickshire ===
After an unsuccessful year at Derbyshire, Clarke signed a three-year deal with Warwickshire in September 2008. Warwickshire had been interested in Clarke for a long time and Ashley Giles, the club's director of cricket, said:

I played with Rikki for England in Bangladesh and have always regarded him as a talented and exciting cricketer. That talent is unfulfilled at present but I am sure there is more to come from him. He has bags of raw ability and it's up to me and the rest of the coaching team to mould that ability into the top-class cricketer that he is capable of being.

— Ashley Giles, September 2008

At the end of the 2008 season, Warwickshire secured promotion to the first division of the County Championship. Clarke came into prominence in a game in late April 2009 against Hampshire at Edgbaston. Clarke took 2/63 in the Hampshire first innings, and then went on to score a lusty 112 from 86 balls in a Warwickshire reply of 630/8 declared. During a match against Kent in May 2010, Clarke took his first ever five-wicket haul in first-class cricket, taking 6/63. Playing in 15 County Championship matches that season, Clarke took 32 wickets at an average of 23.21, and managed 673 runs at average of 29.26 with one century.

In a County Championship match in April 2011 Clarke took the second five-wicket haul of his first-class career, taking 5/10 in the second innings as Warwickshire bowled out Somerset for 50 runs to complete an innings victory. Later that year Warwickshire awarded Clarke his cap. During a County Championship fixture against Lancashire in August, Clarke took nine catches, equalling the record held by Wally Hammond for most catches in a match by a non-wicketkeeper. Clarke's contract with the club was due to expire at the end of the season, and Sussex took the opportunity to approach Clarke and offer him a contract. Though Warwickshire had offered him a new two-year deal it was expected that he would join Sussex, where he would bat higher up the order in one-day matches, though he turned down their offer in September. Soon after he struck his only first-class century of the season, managing 126 runs off 101 balls against Nottinghamshire. He finished the season with 558 runs from 15 matches at an average of 26.57, and aside from his hundred against Nottinghamshire towards the end of the season scored two half-centuries.

Clarke scored a century against Lancashire in the 2012 County Championship; coming in to bat with the score on 81/7, Clarke built a partnership of 224 runs with Darren Maddy, four runs short of Warwickshire's record for the 8th wicket.

=== Return to Surrey ===
In 2017 Clarke returned to Surrey, as part of an exchange deal that saw Dom Sibley join Warwickshire.

In 2018 he contributed to Surrey winning the county championship for the first time since 2002, and was nominated for the PCA player of the year award, claiming 49 wickets and scoring 500 runs. He was named Surrey's player of the year in 2019.

He has been awarded a benefit season by Surrey in 2021.

Clarke retired at the end of the 2021 season, to take up a teaching position.

== International career ==
Some more good performances in the early part of 2003 brought Clarke his England debut, for the One Day International against Pakistan at Old Trafford. Although he took a wicket with his first ball in ODIs (the first Englishman to achieve this feat for three decades) he had a poor match overall, being bowled behind his legs for a duck attempting a sweep shot, and conceding 41 runs from his 7.2 overs bowled. He was retained for the rest of the summer's ODIs, taking three wickets and having a batting high score of 37.

A groin injury to Andrew Flintoff led to Clarke being drafted into the squad for the 2003/04 tour of Bangladesh, during which he made his Test debut at Dhaka. He played a second Test at Chittagong, where he made 55 in the first innings and a rapid 27 from 16 balls in the second innings to help set up a declaration. He also picked up three wickets, with analysis of 7–4–7–2 in Bangladesh's first innings. He played in the first ODI of the subsequent tour of Sri Lanka, a ten-wicket defeat, and was not selected for any other international games on that tour.

At the end of that winter, England toured the West Indies, and Clarke was picked for five of the seven ODIs. He struggled in those matches, scoring less than 10 in all four innings with the bat and taking 3–108 from the 18 overs he bowled. There was speculation he would be dropped from the ODI team, but injuries to Flintoff and Marcus Trescothick provided a reprieve. In summer 2004 Clarke was included in the ODI team that faced West Indies at Leeds, but conceded 30 runs from four overs. Clarke was then dropped from the England team.

Stronger domestic performances in 2005 earned him a recall to the England academy, but he was not selected for any England squads. In 2006 his domestic form was strong, averaging 64.66 (including a career best 214) with the bat. He was then recalled to England's one-day squad, playing against Pakistan at Lord's where he scored 39 in difficult conditions. However he scored only 6 more runs in the following two matches. With the ball, he conceded a total of 64 runs from 10.5 overs bowled in the three matches, taking one wicket. He was included in the squad for the 2006 ICC Champions Trophy but did not play.

Despite continuing to perform well at domestic level, Clarke was never selected for England again.

Sporting positions
Preceded by Simon Katich	Derbyshire cricket captains 2008	Succeeded by Chris Rogers
