= Chris Wright (cricketer) =

English cricketer (born 1985)

Personal information
- Full name: Christopher Ian Wright
- Born: 14 July 1985 (age 41); Chipping Norton, Oxfordshire, England
- Nickname: Wrighty, The Baron
- Height: 6 ft 3 in (1.91 m)
- Batting: Right-handed
- Bowling: Right-arm fast-medium

Domestic team information
- Years: Team
- 2004–2007: Middlesex
- 2005–2006: Tamil Union
- 2008–2011: Essex
- 2011–2018: Warwickshire
- 2019–2025: Leicestershire

Career statistics
Competition	FC	LA	T20
Matches	211	141	62
Runs scored	4,096	352	30
Batting average	19.05	11.35	4.28
100s/50s	0/15	0/0	0/0
Top score	87	42	6*
Balls bowled	34,296	5,935	1,222
Wickets	602	149	53
Bowling average	32.47	36.05	34.60
5 wickets in innings	19	1	0
10 wickets in match	0	0	0
Best bowling	7/53	6/35	4/24
Catches/stumpings	41/–	24/–	13/–
- Source: ESPNcricinfo, 27 September 2025

Christopher Julian Clement Wright (born 14 July 1985) is an English former professional cricketer turned cricket coach.

A right-arm medium-fast bowler, he made his first-class debut for Middlesex in 2004.

In August 2007, he signed a two-year contract to play for Essex until the end of the 2009 season. In March 2009, this was extended until the end of the 2011 season. However, they allowed him to play for Warwickshire on loan in August 2011, with the move later made permanent.

Wright's career blossomed at his third club. In the 2012 season, Wright formed an impressive opening attack partnership with Keith Barker for Warwickshire, helping the side capture the County Championship. Wright took over 50 first-class wickets in the season. His success led him to a call up to the England Lions cricket team, and a new four-year contract with Warwickshire. However, in 2013 he suffered a stress-fracture of his back which hampered his progress.

In July 2018 it was announced that he would make the move at the end of the season to Leicestershire, as first-team opportunities at Warwickshire had become scarce.

In September 2021, during the 2021 County Championship, Wright took his 500th first-class wicket.

In July 2024 he was given a nine-month backdated ban for failing a drugs test. Wright, who tested positive for ostarine - a drug which has similar effects to testosterone - in September 2023, admitted two charges of breaching England and Wales Cricket Board anti-doping rules.

In September 2025, Wright announced he would retire from professional cricket at the end of that year's county season. He took his 600th first-class wicket in his final match against Northamptonshire on 25 September 2025.

Derbyshire named Wright as the club's bowling coach in December 2025.
