= Oliver Hannon-Dalby =

English cricketer (born 1989)

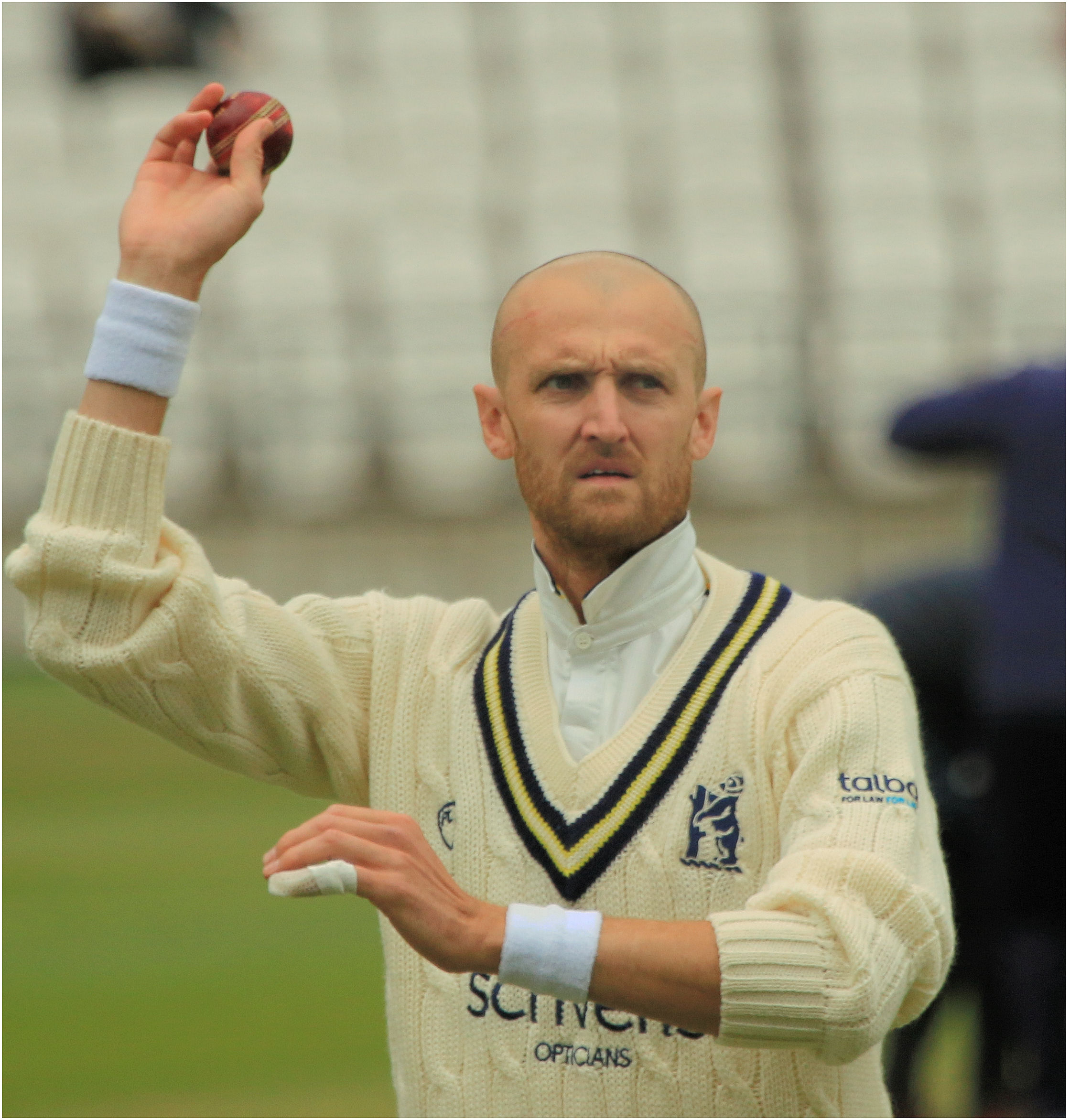
- Hannon-Dalby in 2025

Personal information
- Full name: Oliver James Hannon-Dalby
- Born: 20 June 1989 (age 37); Halifax, West Yorkshire, England
- Height: 6 ft 8 in (2.03 m)
- Batting: Left-handed
- Bowling: Right-arm medium fast
- Role: Bowler

Domestic team information
- Years: Team
- 2008–2012: Yorkshire
- 2013–present: Warwickshire (squad no. 20)
- 2026: → Worcestershire (on loan)
- FC debut: 21 May 2008 Yorkshire v Surrey
- LA debut: 22 May 2011 Yorkshire v Worcestershire

Career statistics
| Competition | FC | LA | T20 |
|---|---|---|---|
| Matches | 147 | 82 | 68 |
| Runs scored | 781 | 158 | 57 |
| Batting average | 7.65 | 10.53 | 7.12 |
| 100s/50s | 0/0 | 0/0 | 0/0 |
| Top score | 40 | 21* | 14* |
| Balls bowled | 24,047 | 4,004 | 1,399 |
| Wickets | 431 | 141 | 82 |
| Bowling average | 27.66 | 27.25 | 25.14 |
| 5 wickets in innings | 17 | 3 | 0 |
| 10 wickets in match | 1 | 0 | 0 |
| Best bowling | 7/46 | 5/27 | 4/20 |
| Catches/stumpings | 21/– | 24/– | 13/– |
- Source: Cricinfo, 26 September 2026

Oliver James Hannon-Dalby (born 20 June 1989) is an English cricketer, currently with Warwickshire having previously played for Yorkshire County Cricket Club. He is a left-handed batsman and a right arm medium-fast bowler.

Hannon-Dalby was a graduate of the Yorkshire Cricket Academy. He made his first-class debut against Surrey on 21 May 2008, where his first wicket was that of prolific runscorer Mark Ramprakash.

He gained his first five-wicket haul of 5 for 68 against Warwickshire in the first match of the 2010 County Championship season. He followed this up in the second match with another haul, coincidentally also 5 for 68, against Somerset at Headingley.

He played a key part in Warwickshire's first T20 title in 2014 taking three wickets in the final. Hannon-Dalby was one of Warwickshire's primary bowlers in their title win in the 2021 County Championship taking 24 wickets. He played a similarly important role in Warwickshire's 2026 County Championship win taking 28 wickets at 19.80.

In February 2025 he was elected as chair of the Professional Cricketers' Association.
