= 2026 Women's One-Day Cup =

Women's List A cricket tournament in England

- Dates: 11 April – 20 September 2026
- Administrator: England and Wales Cricket Board
- Cricket format: List A
- Tournament format(s): League 1: Double round-robin and knockout League 2: Single round-robin and knockout
- Host(s): England; Wales
- Champions: League 1: The Blaze (1st title); League 2: Middlesex (1st title)
- Participants: League 1: 9 League 2: 9
- Matches: League 1: 74; League 2: 40
- Most runs: League 1:Maia Bouchier (750); League 2:
- Most wickets: League 1:Amanda-Jade Wellington (40); League 2:
- Official website: ecb.co.uk

The 2026 Women's One-Day Cup (also known as the 2026 Metro Bank Women's One-Day Cup for sponsorship reasons) was the second season of the Women's One-Day Cup, a professional List A cricket tournament that is played in England and Wales by county clubs. The tournament started on 11 April and concluded with the League One final on 19 September 2026 and the League Two final on 20 September 2026. The Blaze won the League One title, defeating Hampshire by three wickets in the final. Middlesex won the League Two title, defeating Glamorgan by 67 runs in the final.

== Format ==
The tournament is split into two leagues: both featuring nine counties in each league. In League One the teams will play each other twice, followed by a knock-out. There will then be a 2nd v 3rd place eliminator before the final. In League Two the teams will play each other once, followed by a knockout involving the top four ranked teams.

== Points table ==
=== League One table ===
Pos	Team	Pld	W	L	T	NR	BP	Pts	NRR	Qualification
1	The Blaze (C)	16	13	3	0	0	9	61	0.778	Advance to knockout stage
2	Hampshire (R)	16	12	3	0	1	6	56	0.693	Advance to knockout stage
3	Surrey	16	9	7	0	0	4	40	0.422	Advance to knockout stage
4	Lancashire	16	8	8	0	0	3	35	0.408	
5	Somerset	16	8	8	0	0	3	35	0.057	
6	Warwickshire	16	7	8	0	1	2	32	−0.869	
7	Durham	16	6	9	1	0	2	28	−0.422	
8	Essex	16	4	12	0	0	0	16	−1.058	
9	Yorkshire	16	3	12	1	0	2	16	−0.388	

Updated to match(es) played on 16 September 2026. Source: ESPNcricinfoECB
(C) Champions; (R) Runners-up

=== League One-point summary ===
Team	Group matches																Play-offs	
Team	1	2	3	4	5	6	7	8	9	10	11	12	13	14	15	16	E	F
Durham	0	4	4	4	6	6	10	15	19	19	24	24	24	24	24	28	—	—
Essex	0	0	0	0	4	8	12	12	12	12	12	12	12	12	16	16	—	—
Hampshire	4	6	11	15	15	19	23	23	27	32	37	41	41	46	51	56	W	L
Lancashire	5	5	5	5	10	10	10	10	10	14	19	23	27	31	31	35	—	—
Somerset	4	8	13	13	13	13	13	13	13	18	23	27	31	31	35	35	—	—
Surrey	4	9	14	14	14	14	18	22	22	22	22	26	26	31	36	40	L	—
The Blaze	4	4	9	13	18	23	28	32	36	36	41	46	51	56	56	61	→	W
Warwickshire	0	2	6	6	10	10	14	18	22	22	22	27	27	32	32	32	—	—
Yorkshire	0	0	5	10	12	12	12	12	16	16	16	16	16	16	16	16	—	—

Win	Loss	Tie	No result	Eliminated

- Note: The total points at the end of each group match are listed.
- Note: Click on the points or results to see the match summary.

=== League Two table ===
Pos	Team	Pld	W	L	NR	BP	Pts	NRR
1	Glamorgan	4	4	0	0	2	18	1.154
2	Middlesex	3	3	0	0	3	15	1.762
3	Sussex Sharks	4	2	2	0	2	10	1.221
4	Northamptonshire Steelbacks	3	2	1	0	1	9	0.540
5	Kent	4	2	2	0	0	8	−0.016
6	Leicestershire Foxes	4	2	2	0	0	8	−0.144
7	Worcestershire Rapids	3	1	2	0	0	4	−1.413
8	Gloucestershire	4	0	4	0	0	0	−1.479
9	Derbyshire Falcons	3	0	3	0	0	0	−1.562

Updated to match(es) played on 10 May 2026. Source: ECBBBC Sport

=== League Two-point summary ===
Team	Group matches								Play-offs	
Team	1	2	3	4	5	6	7	8	SF	F
Derbyshire Falcons	0	0	0	0						
Glamorgan	4	9	14	18	18					
Gloucestershire	0	0	0	0						
Kent	0	4	8	8						
Leicestershire Foxes	4	4	4	8	10					
Middlesex	5	10	15	15						
Northamptonshire Steelbacks	4	9	9	11						
Sussex Sharks	0	5	5	10	14					
Worcestershire Rapids	0	4	4	9						

Win	Loss	Tie	No result	Eliminated

- Note: The total points at the end of each group match are listed.
- Note: Click on the points or results to see the match summary.

== League One ==
=== Round 1 ===
Match 1
11 April 2026
10:30
Scorecard

Lancashire; 303/8 (48 overs)	v	Durham; 154 (40 overs)
Gaby Lewis 131 (116); Katherine Fraser 3/32 (7 overs)		Emily Windsor 46 (61); Emma Lamb 4/29 (8 overs)

Lancashire won by 149 runs
Riverside Ground, Chester-le-Street
Umpires: Gabi Brown and Simon Widdup

- Durham won the toss and elected to field.
- The match was reduced to 48 overs per side due to rain.
- Points: Lancashire 5, Durham 0

Match 2
11 April 2026
10:30
Scorecard

Surrey; 389/9 (50 overs)	v	Warwickshire; 337/9 (50 overs)
Danni Wyatt-Hodge 124 (80); Mary Taylor 3/78 (10 overs)		Em Arlott 90 (74); Tilly Corteen-Coleman 3/43 (10 overs)

Surrey won by 52 runs
Edgbaston, Birmingham
Umpires: Paul Baldwin and Amy Clark

- Warwickshire won the toss and elected to field.
- Points: Surrey 4, Warwickshire 0

Match 3
11 April 2026
10:30
Scorecard

Yorkshire; 178 (33.5 overs)	v	Somerset; 179/9 (46 overs)
Lauren Winfield-Hill 36 (41); Alex Griffiths 4/22 (8.5 overs)		Sophie Luff 76 (101); Claudie Cooper 3/28 (9 overs)

Somerset won by 1 wicket
County Ground, Taunton
Umpires: Ian Blackwell and Sam Hollingshead

- Somerset won the toss and elected to field.
- Points: Somerset 4, Yorkshire 0

Match 4
11 April 2026
10:30
Scorecard

Essex; 265/8 (50 overs)	v	Hampshire; 266/5 (49.4 overs)
Jodi Grewcock 80 (97); Naomi Dattani 2/43 (8 overs)		Ella McCaughan 90 (101); Esmae MacGregor 1/31 (7 overs)

Hampshire won by 5 wickets
Rose Bowl, Southampton
Umpires: Rose Fernando and Ben Peverall

- Hampshire won the toss and elected to field.
- Points: Hampshire 4, Essex 0

=== Round 2 ===
Match 5
15 April 2026
10:30
Scorecard

Durham; 311/3 (50 overs)	v	Essex; 288/5 (50 overs)
Tahlia Wilson 152 (163); Jodi Grewcock 1/34 (6 overs)		Jodi Grewcock 77 (69); Katherine Fraser 1/27 (6 overs)

Durham won by 23 runs
Riverside Ground, Chester-le-Street
Umpires: Naeem Ashraf and Amy Clark

- Durham won the toss and elected to bat.
- Points: Durham 4, Essex 0

Match 6
15 April 2026
10:30
Scorecard

Warwickshire; 354/7 (50 overs)	v	Hampshire
Davina Perrin 81 (76); Bex Tyson 3/66 (10 overs)

No result
Edgbaston, Birmingham
Umpires: Julia Jarvis and Simon Widdup

- Hampshire won the toss and elected to field.
- Rain prevented any further play.
- Points: Hampshire 2, Warwickshire Bears 2

Match 7
15 April 2026
10:30
Scorecard

Yorkshire; 185 (40.1 overs)	v	Surrey; 193/7 (23.3 overs)
Lauren Winfield-Hill 60 (70); Kalea Moore 3/22 (8 overs)		Paige Scholfield 89 (42); Maddie Ward 3/38 (5 overs)

Surrey won by 3 wickets (DLS method)
The Oval, London
Umpires: Hassan Adnan and James Tredwell

- Surrey won the toss and elected to field.
- The match was reduced to 44 overs per side due to rain.
- Surrey were set a revised target of 193 runs from 44 overs due to rain.
- Points: Surrey 5, Yorkshire 0

Match 8
15 April 2026
10:30
Scorecard

Lancashire; 223 (48.3 overs)	v	The Blaze; 148/5 (28.3 overs)
Emma Lamb 77 (98); Grace Ballinger 3/30 (10 overs)		Marie Kelly 44 (64); Grace Potts 1/24 (5.3 overs)

The Blaze won by 6 runs (DLS method)
Trent Bridge, Nottingham
Umpires: Gabi Brown and Rose Fernando

- The Blaze won the toss and elected to field.
- The Blaze were set a revised target of 171 runs from 32 overs due to rain.
- The Blaze were 6 runs ahead in DLS par score when play was stopped due to rain.
- Points: The Blaze 4, Lancashire 0

=== Round 3 ===
Match 9
18 April 2026
10:30
Scorecard

Essex; 157 (39.4 overs)	v	Warwickshire; 160/5 (40.4 overs)
Grace Scrivens 59 (88); Charis Pavely 2/10 (3.4 overs)		Davina Perrin 43 (59); Joanne Gardner 1/13 (4 overs)

Warwickshire won by 5 wickets
County Ground, Chelmsford
Umpires: Rose Fernando and Julia Jarvis

- Essex won the toss and elected to bat.
- Points: Warwickshire 4, Essex 0

Match 10
19 April 2026
10:30
Scorecard

Lancashire; 259/8 (50 overs)	v	Somerset; 260/6 (47.5 overs)
Eleanor Threlkeld 71 (85); Alex Griffiths 3/51 (10 overs)		Heather Knight 63 (69); Sophie Ecclestone 2/46 (10 overs)

Somerset won by 4 wickets
Trafalgar Road Ground, Southport
Umpires: Graeme Cross and Simon Widdup

- Somerset won the toss and elected to field.
- Points: Somerset 4, Lancashire 0

Match 11
18 April 2026
10:30
Scorecard

Yorkshire; 280/9 (50 overs)	v	The Blaze; 210 (41.2 overs)
Lauren Winfield-Hill 90 (101); Georgia Elwiss 2/35 (5 overs)		Marie Kelly 56 (73); Jess Jonassen 4/18 (7 overs)

Yorkshire won by 70 runs
Headingley, Leeds
Umpires: Amy Clark and Neil Pratt

- The Blaze won the toss and elected to field.
- Points: Yorkshire 5, The Blaze 0

Match 12
18 April 2026
10:30
Scorecard

Durham; 256/8 (50 overs)	v	Surrey; 258/7 (36.4 overs)
Hollie Armitage 106 (123); Tilly Corteen-Coleman 2/38 (10 overs)		Danni Wyatt-Hodge 96 (83); Lauren Filer 5/59 (10 overs)

Surrey won by 3 wickets
The Oval, London
Umpires: Grace Bambury and Anna Harris

- Durham won the toss and elected to bat.
- Points: Surrey 5, Durham 0

=== Round 4 ===
Match 13
25 April 2026
10:30
Scorecard

Essex; 213 (49.2 overs)	v	The Blaze; 215/7 (39.3 overs)
Amara Carr 50 (45); Kathryn Bryce 2/22 (7.2 overs)		Orla Prendergast 69* (77); Sophie Munro 2/28 (9 overs)

The Blaze won by 3 wickets
County Ground, Chelmsford
Umpires: Gabi Brown and James Tredwell

- Essex won the toss and elected to bat.
- Points: The Blaze 5, Essex 0

Match 14
25 April 2026
10:30
Scorecard

Yorkshire; 241 (49.2 overs)	v	Lancashire; 158 (41.4 overs)
Jess Jonassen 108 (122); Kate Cross 4/38 (10 overs)		Seren Smale 46 (56); Jess Jonassen 4/30 (10 overs)

Yorkshire won by 83 runs
Old Trafford, Manchester
Umpires: Amy Clark and Grace Bambury

- Lancashire won the toss and elected to field.
- Yorkshire 5, Lancashire 0

Match 15
25 April 2026
10:30
Scorecard

Somerset; 337/9 (50 overs)	v	Surrey; 201 (33.2 overs)
Heather Knight 103 (107); Maitlan Brown 4/57 (10 overs)		Alice Capsey 59 (58); Charlie Dean 3/22 (7.2 overs)

Somerset won by 136 runs
County Ground, Taunton
Umpires: Rose Fernando and Anthony Harris

- Somerset won the toss and elected to bat.
- Points: Somerset 5, Surrey 0

Match 16
25 April 2026
10:30
Scorecard

Durham; 118 (36.1 overs)	v	Hampshire; 121/4 (24.3 overs)
Tahlia Wilson 31 (40); Lauren Bell 5/22 (8.1 overs)		Maia Bouchier 47 (53); Katherine Fraser 2/16 (4 overs)

Hampshire won by 6 wickets
Rose Bowl, Southampton
Umpires: Sue Redfern and Mohammed Waseem

- Hampshire won by 6 wickets
- Points: Hampshire 5, Durham 0

=== Round 5 ===
Match 17
29 April 2026
10:30
Scorecard

Durham; 290/8 (50 overs)	v	Yorkshire; 290 (50 overs)
Phoebe Turner 100* (82); Ines Blackwell 4/51 (10 overs)		Jess Jonassen 104 (109); Katherine Fraser 1/38 (9 overs)

Match tied
North Marine Road Ground, Scarborough
Umpires: Paul Baldwin and Mohammed Waseem

- Yorkshire won the toss and elected to field.
- Points: Durham 2, Yorkshire 2

Match 18
29 April 2026
10:30
Scorecard

Somerset; 268/9 (50 overs)	v	Essex; 269/5 (48 overs)
Katie Jones 79 (89); Eva Gray 2/49 (9 overs)		Jodi Grewcock 120* (116); Alex Griffiths 3/42 (9 overs)

Essex won by 5 wickets
Taunton Vale Sports Club Ground, Taunton
Umpires: Julia Jarvis and James Tredwell

- Somerset won the toss and elected to bat.
- Jodi Grewcock (Essex) scored her maiden century in professional cricket.
- Points: Essex 4, Somerset 0

Match 19
29 April 2026
10:30
Scorecard

Warwickshire; 302/5 (50 overs)	v	The Blaze; 302/7 (49.2 overs)
Charis Pavely 128* (102); Charley Phillips 2/25 (9 overs)		Marie Kelly 79 (94); Issy Wong 2/51 (10 overs)

The Blaze won by 3 wickets
Trent Bridge, Nottingham
Umpires: Sue Redfern and Simon Widdup

- Warwickshire won the toss and elected to bat.
- Points: The Blaze 4, Warwickshire 0

Match 20
29 April 2026
10:30
Scorecard

Hampshire; 272/5 (50 overs)	v	Surrey; 259 (49 overs)
Abi Norgrove 81* (81); Kalea Moore 2/55 (10 overs)		Danni Wyatt-Hodge 119 (86); Bex Tyson 3/60 (9 overs)

Hampshire won by 13 runs
Rose Bowl, Southampton
Umpires: Gabi Brown and Rose Fernando

- Hampshire won the toss and elected to bat.
- Points: Hampshire 4, Surrey 0

=== Round 6 ===
Match 21
2 May 2026
10:30
Scorecard

Warwickshire; 336 (49.5 overs)	v	Somerset; 302 (49.4 overs)
Charis Pavely 127 (103); Chloe Skelton 4/65 (10 overs)		Niamh Holland 65 (66); Alexa Stonehouse 3/70 (9.4 overs)

Warwickshire won by 34 runs
Edgbaston, Birmingham
Umpires: Julia Jarvis and Ben Peverall

- Warwickshire won the toss and elected to bat.
- Ruby Davis replaced Sophie Luff as an injury substitute for Somerset.
- Points: Warwickshire 4, Somerset 0

Match 22
2 May 2026
10:30
Scorecard

Hampshire; 153 (42.1 overs)	v	Lancashire; 157/4 (33.3 overs)
Amanda-Jade Wellington 32 (40); Kate Cross 3/31 (10 overs)		Emma Lamb 56 (85); Daisy Gibb 2/15 (6 overs)

Lancashire won by 6 wickets
Old Trafford, Manchester
Umpires: Paul Baldwin and Rose Fernando

- Lancashire won the toss and elected to field.
- Points: Lancashire 5, Hampshire 0

Match 23
2 May 2026
10:30
Scorecard

Essex; 270/8 (50 overs)	v	Yorkshire; 257 (46.1 overs)
Cordelia Griffith 69 (86); Rachel Slater 2/51 (8 overs)		Lauren Winfield-Hill 88 (73); Eva Gray 3/51 (10 overs)

Essex won by 13 runs
Headingley, Leeds
Umpires: Naeem Ashraf and Simon Widdup

- Yorkshire won the toss and elected field.
- Points: Essex 4, Yorkshire 0

Match 24
2 May 2026
10:30
Scorecard

The Blaze; 240/8 (50 overs)	v	Durham; 148 (39.2 overs)
Kirstie Gordon 60* (73); Katie Levick 3/36 (10 overs)		Grace Thompson 49 (71); Charley Phillips 5/49 (10 overs)

The Blaze won by 92 runs
Riverside Ground, Chester-le-Street
Umpires: Gabi Brown and Mohammed Waseem

- The Blaze won the toss and elected to bat.
- Points: The Blaze 5, Durham 0

=== Round 7 ===
Match 25
4 May 2026
10:30
Scorecard

Surrey; 164 (43 overs)	v	The Blaze; 166/6 (34.3 overs)
Priyanaz Chatterji 45 (68); Kirstie Gordon 3/37 (10 overs)		Georgia Elwiss 76* (95); Alice Monaghan 2/30 (5 overs)

The Blaze won by 4 wickets
Trent Bridge, Nottingham
Umpires: Gabi Brown and Paul Pollard

- The Blaze won the toss and elected to field.
- Points: The Blaze 5, Surrey 0

Match 26
6 May 2026
10:30
Scorecard

Lancashire; 251/7 (50 overs)	v	Essex; 252/5 (47 overs)
Eve Jones 98 (135); Grace Scrivens 2/38 (7 overs)		Grace Scrivens 74 (83); Kate Cross 1/32 (10 overs)

Essex win by 5 wickets
County Ground, Chelmsford
Umpires: Anna Harris and Rose Fernando

- Essex won the toss and elected to field.
- Points: Essex 4, Lancashire 0

Match 27
6 May 2026
10:30
Scorecard

Warwickshire; 289/6 (50 overs)	v	Durham; 290/5 (45.5 overs)
Davina Perrin 69 (105); Mady Villiers 3/38 (10 overs)		Mady Villiers 106 (86); Alexa Stonehouse 3/53 (8.5 overs)

Durham win by 5 wickets
Edgbaston, Birmingham
Umpires: Anthony Harris and Julia Jarvis

- Warwickshire won the toss and elected to bat.
- Points: Durham 4, Warwickshire 0

Match 28
6 May 2026
10:30
Scorecard

Somerset; 281/6 (50 overs)	v	Hampshire; 282/5 (40.4 overs)
Rebecca Odgers 133* (150); Amanda-Jade Wellington 2/31 (10 overs)		Maia Bouchier 143 (111); Olivia Barnes 1/32 (4 overs)

Hampshire win by 5 wickets
Rose Bowl, Southampton
Umpires: Grace Bambury and Chris Watts

- Hampshire won the toss and elected to field.
- Points: Hampshire 4, Somerset 0

=== Round 8 ===
Match 29
13 May 2026
10:30
Scorecard

Essex; 227 (49.5 overs)	v	Surrey; 229/7 (42.1 overs)
Florence Miller 74* (68); Danielle Gregory 3/51 (10 overs)		Alice Monaghan 49 (67); Sophia Smale 2/35 (9.1 overs)

Surrey won by 3 wickets
The Oval, London
Umpires: Rose Fernando and Mohammed Waseem

- Surrey won the toss and elected to field.
- Points: Surrey 4, Essex 0

Match 30
12 May 2026
10:30
Scorecard

Hampshire; 205/7 (38 overs)	v	Yorkshire; 196/8 (38 overs)
Ella McCaughan 51 (68); Jess Jonassen 3/24 (8 overs)		Sterre Kalis 46 (60); Naomi Dattani 2/35 (6 overs)

Hampshire won by 16 runs (DLS method)
Clifton Park Ground, York
Umpires: Graeme Cross and Julia Jarvis

- Yorkshire won the toss and elected to field.
- The match was reduced to 38 overs per side due to rain.
- Yorkshire were set a revised target of 213 runs from 38 overs due to rain.
- Points: Hampshire 4, Yorkshire 0

Match 31
13 May 2026
10:30
Scorecard

Somerset; 222/9 (50 overs)	v	The Blaze; 224/4 (39.1 overs)
Anika Learoyd 97 (118); Charley Phillips 2/33 (7 overs)		Tammy Beaumont 99* (109); Alex Griffiths 1/47 (9 overs)

The Blaze won by 6 wickets
The Maer Ground, Exmouth
Umpires: Anthony Harris and Ben Peverall

- The Blaze won the toss and elected to field.
- Points: The Blaze 5, Somerset 0

Match 32
13 May 2026
10:30
Scorecard

Lancashire; 226/9 (42 overs)	v	Warwickshire; 230/6 (40.3 overs)
Eleanor Threlkeld 39 (51); Mary Taylor 3/47 (9 overs)		Charis Pavely 63 (58); Kate Cross 2/42 (7 overs)

Warwickshire won by 4 wickets
Trafalgar Road Ground, Southport
Umpires: Naeem Ashraf and Sam Hollingshead

- Warwickshire won the toss and elected to field.
- The match was reduced to 42 overs per side due to rain.
- Points: Warwickshire 4, Lancashire 0

=== Round 9 ===
Match 33
15 May 2026
10:30
Scorecard

Hampshire; 209 (50 overs)	v	The Blaze; 211/7 (45.1 overs)
Georgia Adams 89 (121); Charley Phillips 4/31 (8 overs)		Tammy Beaumont 57 (86); Bex Tyson 3/52 (10 overs)

The Blaze won by 3 wickets
Trent Bridge, Nottingham
Umpires: Sam Hollingshead and Mohammed Waseem

- Hampshire won the toss and elected to bat.
- Points: The Blaze 4, Hampshire 0

Match 34
16 May 2026
10:30
Scorecard

Lancashire; 246/9 (50 overs)	v	Surrey; 250/7 (46 overs)
Eve Jones 69 (105); Danielle Gregory 3/42 (10 overs)		Kira Chathli 88* (101); Kate Cross 3/52 (10 overs)

Surrey won by 3 wickets
The Oval, London
Umpires: Grace Bambury and Julia Jarvis

- Surrey won the toss and elected to field.
- Points: Surrey 4, Lancashire 0

Match 35
16 May 2026
10:30
Scorecard

Yorkshire; 238 (49.2 overs)	v	Warwickshire; 239/7 (47.2 overs)
Jess Jonassen 110 (102); Georgia Davis 3/43 (10 overs)		Chloe Brewer 56 (62); Jess Jonassen 2/32 (10 overs)

Warwickshire won by 3 wickets
North Marine Road Ground, Scarborough
Umpires: Anthony Harris and Surendiran Shanmugam

- Yorkshire won the toss and elected to bat.
- Points: Warwickshire 4, Yorkshire 0

Match 36
16 May 2026
10:30
Scorecard

Durham; 292/8 (50 overs)	v	Somerset; 172 (38.3 overs)
Hollie Armitage 58 (83); Chloe Skelton 2/51 (10 overs)		Niamh Holland 67 (73); Katie Levick 6/37 (9.3 overs)

Durham won by 120 runs
Riverside Ground, Chester-le-Street
Umpires: Naeem Ashraf and Paul Baldwin

- Durham won the toss and elected to bat.
- Points: Durham 5, Somerset 0

=== Round 10 ===
Match 37
13 June 2026
10:30
Scorecard

Durham; 291/9 (50 overs)	v	Essex; 245 (47.1 overs)
Mady Villiers 76 (70); Sophia Smale 4/51 (10 overs)		Nancy Harman 72 (60); Trudy Johnson 3/28 (6 overs)

Durham won by 46 runs
County Ground, Chelmsford
Umpires: James Tredwell and Kylie White

- Durham won the toss and elected to bat.
- Points: Durham 4, Essex 0

Match 38
13 June 2026
10:30
Scorecard

Warwickshire; 314/7 (50 overs)	v	Lancashire; 294 (50 overs)
Katie George 127 (97); Tara Norris 2/83 (10 overs)		Eve Jones 113 (115); Charis Pavely 4/54 (10 overs)

Warwickshire won by 20 runs
Edgbaston Foundation Community Sports Ground, Birmingham
Umpires: Graeme Cross and Simon Widdup

- Warwickshire won the toss and elected to bat.
- Points: Warwickshire 4, Lancashire 0

Match 39
13 June 2026
10:30
Scorecard

Surrey; 252/9 (50 overs)	v	The Blaze; 253/5 (48.2 overs)
Jemima Spence 59 (72); Maria Andrews 3/40 (10 overs)		Georgia Elwiss 96 (102); Alice Davidson-Richards 2/22 (5 overs)

The Blaze won by 5 wickets
County Ground, Beckenham
Umpires: Grace Bambury and Sam Hollingshead

- The Blaze won the toss and elected to field.
- Points: The Blaze 4, Surrey 0

Match 40
13 June 2026
10:30
Scorecard

Hampshire; 303/7 (50 overs)	v	Somerset; 264 (46.3 overs)
Francesca Sweet 57 (52); Olivia Barnes 3/54 (9 overs)		Anika Learoyd 87 (83); Georgia Adams 3/45 (9 overs)

Hampshire won by 39 runs
County Ground, Taunton
Umpires: Paul Baldwin and Mohammed Waseem

- Somerset won the toss and elected to field.
- Points: Hampshire 4, Somerset 0

=== Round 11 ===
Match 41
17 June 2026
10:30
Scorecard

Durham; 193 (49.4 overs)	v	Yorkshire; 194/4 (47.3 overs)
Grace Thompson 40 (50); Sarah Glenn 3/40 (10 overs)		Erin Thomas 67 (112); Emma Marlow 1/24 (6 overs)

Yorkshire won by 6 wickets
Riverside Ground, Chester-le-Street
Umpires: Anthony Harris and Simon Widdup

- Durham won the toss and elected to bat.
- Points: Yorkshire 4, Durham 0

Match 42
17 June 2026
10:30
Scorecard

Lancashire; 239 (50 overs)	v	The Blaze; 211 (47.1 overs)
Fi Morris 57 (68); Lucy Higham 2/35 (7 overs)		Tammy Beaumont; Fi Morris 4/33 (10 overs)

Lancashire won by 28 runs
Stanley Park, Blackpool
Umpires: Naeem Ashraf and Neil Pratt

- Lancashire won the toss and elected to bat.
- Points: Lancashire 4, The Blaze 0

Match 43
17 June 2026
10:30
Scorecard

Warwickshire; 160 (33.3 overs)	v	Somerset; 161/3 (21.4 overs)
Amu Surenkumar 58 (72); Olivia Barnes 4/24 (8.3 overs)		Anika Learoyd 70* (58); Georgia Davis 1/31 (4 overs)

Somerset won by 7 wickets
The Maer Ground, Exmouth
Umpires: Hassan Adnan and Dean Daniels

- Somerset won the toss and elected to field.
- Points: Somerset 5, Warwickshire 0

Match 44
17 June 2026
10:30
Scorecard

Essex; 245 (49 overs)	v	Hampshire; 246/0 (38.2 overs)
Liberty Heap 75 (63); Bex Tyson 3/66 (10 overs)		Maia Bouchier 136* (114)

Hampshire won by 10 wickets
County Ground, Chelmsford
Umpires: Paul Baldwin and Gabi Brown

- Hampshire won the toss and elected to field.
- Points: Hampshire 5, Essex 0

=== Round 12 ===
Match 45
23 June 2026
10:30
Scorecard

Surrey; 179 (39.4 overs)	v	Durham; 183/4 (36.4 overs)
Alice Davidson-Richards 26 (21); Katie Levick 4/31 (8 overs)		Hollie Armitage 76* (97); Bethan Miles 2/30 (7.4 overs)

Durham won by 6 wickets
Riverside Ground, Chester-le-Street
Umpires: Naeem Ashraf and Anthony Harris

- Surrey won the toss and elected to bat.
- Points: Durham 5, Surrey 0

Match 46
23 June 2026
10:30
Scorecard

Yorkshire; 150 (42.3 overs)	v	The Blaze; 151/6 (30.1 overs)
Sarah Glenn 30 (41); Charley Phillips 3/29 (8.3 overs)		Marie Kelly 66 (87); Beth Langston 3/43 (8 overs)

The Blaze won by 4 wickets
Queen's Park, Chesterfield
Umpires: Mohammed Waseem and Kylie White

- Yorkshire won the toss and elected to bat.
- Points: The Blaze 5, Yorkshire 0

Match 47
23 June 2026
10:30
Scorecard

Lancashire; 272/9 (50 overs)	v	Essex; 119 (35 overs)
Eve Jones 54 (78); Esmae MacGregor 3/44 (9 overs)		Anneke Bosch 32 (37); Fi Morris 6/27 (10 overs)

Lancashire won by 153 runs
Stanley Park, Blackpool
Umpires: Hassan Adnan and Graeme Cross

- Lancashire won the toss and elected to bat.
- Points: Lancashire 5, Essex 0

Match 48
24 June 2026
10:30
Scorecard

Hampshire; 265/7 (50 overs)	v	Warwickshire; 194 (42 overs)
Rhianna Southby 90* (91); Georgia Davis 2/42 (10 overs)		Abigail Freeborn 54 (78); Georgia Adams 3/30 (8 overs)

Hampshire won by 71 runs
Rose Bowl, Southampton
Umpires: Sam Hollingshead and Julia Jarvis

- Hampshire won the toss and elected to bat.
- Points: Hampshire 5, Warwickshire 0

=== Round 13 ===
Match 49
19 August 2026
10:30
Scorecard

Surrey; 228 (44.2 overs)	v	Hampshire; 229/6 (41.3 overs)
Alice Davidson-Richards 61 (81); Amanda-Jade Wellington 4/37 (10 overs)		Georgia Adams 115 (103); Sune Luus 2/39 (8 overs)

Hampshire won by 4 wickets
Woodbridge Road, Guildford
Umpires: Dean Daniels and Rose Fernando

- Hampshire won the toss and elected to field.
- Points: Hampshire 4, Warwickshire 0

Match 50
19 August 2026
10:30
Scorecard

The Blaze; 356/4 (50 overs)	v	Durham; 217 (30.5 overs)
Kathryn Bryce 136 (138); Eleanor Larosa 1/32 (6 overs)		Mady Villiers 65 (34); Kirstie Gordon 4/54 (6 overs)

The Blaze won by 59 runs (DLS method)
Trent Bridge, Nottingham
Umpires: Grace Bambury and Steve O'Shaughnessy

- Durham won the toss and elected to field.
- Durham were set a revised target of 277 runs from 34 overs due to rain.
- Points: The Blaze 4, Durham 0

Match 51
19 August 2026
10:30
Scorecard

Essex; 266/8 (50 overs)	v	Somerset; 267/2 (39.3 overs)
Jodi Grewcock 87 (101); Ellie Anderson 3/44 (10 overs)		Rebecca Odgers 133* (124); Jodi Grewcock 2/33 (8 overs)

Somerset won by 8 wickets
County Ground, Chelmsford
Umpires: Tom Lungley and Kylie White

- Somerset won the toss and elected to field.
- Points: Somerset 5, Essex 0

Match 52
19 August 2026
10:30
Scorecard

Warwickshire; 269/9 (50 overs)	v	Yorkshire; 202 (40.5 overs)
Meg Austin 94 (114); Claudie Cooper 4/55 (10 overs)		Sterre Kalis 52 (71); Em Arlott 3/23 (8 overs)

Warwickshire won by 59 runs (DLS method)
Edgbaston, Birmingham
Umpires: Sue Redfern and Simon Widdup

- Warwickshire won the toss and elected to bat.
- Yorkshire were set a revised target of 260 runs from 46 overs due to rain.
- Points: Warwickshire 5, Yorkshire 0

=== Round 14 ===
Match 53
26 August 2026
10:30
Scorecard

The Blaze; 282/7 (50 overs)	v	Warwickshire; 212 (43.3 overs)
Orla Prendergast 69 (73); Issy Wong 5/58 (10 overs)		Katie George 89 (113); Lucy Higham 4/43 (8.3 overs)

The Blaze won by 70 runs
Edgbaston, Birmingham
Umpires: Chris Watts and Kylie White

- Warwickshire won the toss and elected to field.
- Points: The Blaze 5, Warwickshire 0

Match 54
26 August 2026
10:30
Scorecard

Yorkshire; 171 (33 overs)	v	Surrey; 172/8 (41 overs)
Lauren Winfield-Hill 48 (41); Sune Luus 3/33 (9 overs)		Kira Chathli 66* (75); Hannah Rainey 3/41 (9 overs)

Surrey won by 2 wickets
Ampleforth College, Ampleforth
Umpires: Naeem Ashraf and David Millns

- Surrey won the toss and elected to field
- Points: Surrey 4, Yorkshire 0

Match 55
26 August 2026
10:30
Scorecard

Durham; 248/9 (50 overs)	v	Somerset; 251/7 (44.4 overs)
Emma Marlow 71 (112); Ellie Anderson 5/40 (10 overs)		Charlie Dean 76 (70); Lauren Filer 2/56 (10 overs)

Somerset won by 3 wickets
County Ground, Taunton
Umpires: Rose Fernando and Sue Redfern

- Somerset won the toss and elected to field.
- Points: Somerset 4, Durham 0

Match 56
26 August 2026
10:30
Scorecard

Hampshire; 223 (48.4 overs)	v	Lancashire; 224/6 (48.2 overs)
Freya Kemp 61 (54); Kate Cross 4/33 (9.4 overs)		Emma Lamb 68 (77); Georgia Adams 2/46 (9.2 overs)

Lancashire won by 4 wickets
Rose Bowl, Southampton
Umpires: Hassan Adnan and Dean Daniels

- Lancashire won the toss and elected to field.
- Points: Lancashire 4, Hampshire 0

=== Round 15 ===
Match 57
3 September 2026
10:30
Scorecard

Durham; 200/9 (50 overs)	v	Hampshire; 201/1 (37.3 overs)
Eleanor Larosa 51* (36); Amanda-Jade Wellington 3/30 (10 overs)		Georgia Adams 106* (106); Grace Thompson 1/20 (4 overs)

Hampshire won by 9 wickets
Riverside Ground, Chester-le-Street
Umpires: Paul Baldwin and Bilal Shafayat

- Durham won the toss and elected to bat.
- Points: Hampshire 5, Durham 0

Match 58
3 September 2026
10:30
Scorecard

Lancashire; 234/9 (50 overs)	v	Surrey; 167/6 (38 overs)
Tilly Kesteven 85 (109); Kalea Moore 2/35 (9 overs)		Phoebe Franklin 43 (63); Sophie Morris 2/27 (8 overs)

Lancashire won by 10 runs (DLS method)
Old Trafford, Manchester
Umpires: Graham Lloyd and Kylie White

- Surrey won the toss and elected to field.
- Rain prevented any further play.
- Surrey were 10 runs behind the DLS target when rain stopped the match.
- Points: Lancashire 4, Surrey 0

Match 59
3 September 2026
10:30
Scorecard

Somerset; 130 (38.4 overs)	v	Yorkshire; 125 (27.4 overs)
Jess Hazell 33 (49); Hannah Rainey 3/16 (5 overs)		Ami Campbell 35 (17); Chloe Skelton 4/28 (6.4 overs)

Somerset won by 5 runs
Headingley, Leeds
Umpires: Connor McGarry and Martin Saggers

- Yorkshire won the toss and elected to field.
- Points: Somerset 4, Yorkshire 0

Match 60
3 September 2026
10:30
Scorecard

Essex; 202 (44.5 overs)	v	Warwickshire; 208/3 (36.3 overs)
Liberty Heap 52 (45); Phoebe Brett 4/42 (10 overs)		Katie George 72* (99); Esmae MacGregor 2/39 (8 overs)

Warwickshire won by 7 wickets
Edgbaston, Birmingham
Umpires: Dean Daniels and James Tredwell

- Essex won the toss and elected to bat.
- Points: Warwickshire 5, Essex 0

=== Round 16 ===
Match 61
6 September 2026
10:30
Scorecard

Surrey; 344/7 (50 overs)	v	Essex; 226 (45.5 overs)
Sune Luus 67 (68); Grace Scrivens 2/40 (6 overs)		Lissy Macleod 40 (42); Priyanaz Chatterji 2/21 (5 overs)

Surrey won by 118 runs
County Ground, Chelmsford
Umpires: Julia Jarvis and James Tredwell

- Essex won the toss and elected to field.
- Points: Surrey 5, Essex 0

Match 62
6 September 2026
10:30
Scorecard

Lancashire; 169/8 (38 overs)	v	Durham; 166/9 (38 overs)
Darcey Carter 45 (87); Trudy Johnson 3/27 (8 overs)		Hollie Armitage 54 (73); Sophie Morris 4/28 (8 overs)

Lancashire won by 3 runs
Old Trafford, Manchester
Umpires: Gareth Cross and Mohammed Waseem

- Durham won the toss and elected to field.
- The match was reduced to 38 overs per side due to rain.
- Points: Lancashire 4, Durham 0

Match 63
6 September 2026
10:30
Scorecard

Somerset; 192 (46.1 overs)	v	The Blaze; 193/4 (38.3 overs)
Sophie Luff 52 (57); Lucy Higham 4/28 (9 overs)		Sarah Bryce 54* (65); Ellie Anderson 2/34 (7 overs)

The Blaze won by 6 wickets
Trent Bridge, Nottingham
Umpires: Graham Lloyd and Kylie White

- The Blaze won the toss and elected to field.
- Points: The Blaze 5, Somerset 0

Match 64
6 September 2026
10:30
Scorecard

Yorkshire; 166 (42.3 overs)	v	Hampshire; 170/3 (38.1 overs)
Jess Jonassen 64 (69); Amanda-Jade Wellington 5/25 (10 overs)		Georgia Adams 61 (68); Jess Jonassen 2/20 (10 overs)

Hampshire won by 7 wickets
Rose Bowl, Southampton
Umpires: Anna Harris and Sam Hollingshead

- Yorkshire won the toss and elected to bat.
- Points: Hampshire 5, Yorkshire 0

=== Round 17 ===
Match 65
9 September 2026
10:30
Scorecard

Warwickshire; 55 (18.3 overs)	v	Surrey; 59/0 (10.2 overs)
Katie George 12 (17); Kate Coppack 5/22 (7 overs)		Rachel King 41* (35)

Surrey won by 10 wickets
The Oval, London
Umpires: Gabi Brown and Dean Daniels

- Surrey won the toss and elected to field.
- Points: Surrey 5, Warwickshire 0

Match 66
9 September 2026
10:30
Scorecard

Lancashire; 240/9 (50 overs)	v	Somerset; 241/5 (47.5 overs)
Seren Smale 82 (106); Ellie Anderson 3/41 (9 overs)		Jess Hazell 77* (85); Sophie Morris 2/40 (10 overs)

Somerset won by 5 wickets
County Ground, Taunton
Umpires: Ian Blackwell and Mike Burns

- Somerset won the toss and elected to field.
- Points: Somerset 4, Lancashire 0

Match 67
9 September 2026
10:30
Scorecard

Essex; 241 (49.4 overs)	v	Yorkshire; 233 (49.5 overs)
Grace Scrivens 87 (109); Jess Jonassen 3/30 (10 overs)		Ami Campbell 64 (49); Jodi Grewcock 3/38 (10 overs)

Essex won by 8 runs
County Ground, Chelmsford
Umpires: Mark Newell and Kylie White

- Essex won the toss and elected to bat.
- Points: Essex 4, Yorkshire 0

Match 68
9 September 2026
10:30
Scorecard

The Blaze; 249/7 (50 overs)	v	Hampshire; 250/3 (39.5 overs)
Tammy Beaumont 56 (76); Bex Tyson 3/40 (10 overs)		Maia Bouchier 118 (107); Cassidy McCarthy 1/24 (7.5 overs)

Hampshire won by 7 wickets
Rose Bowl, Southampton
Umpires: Rose Dovey and Julia Jarvis

- Hampshire won the toss and elected to field.
- Points: Hampshire 5, The Blaze 0

=== Round 18 ===
Match 69
11 September 2026
10:30
Scorecard

Essex; 159 (45.4 overs)	v	The Blaze; 162/1 (19.1 overs)
Grace Scrivens 70 (116); Kirstie Gordon 3/25 (9 overs)		Sarah Bryce 70* (52); Esmae MacGregor 1/35 (4 overs)

The Blaze won by 9 wickets
Queen's Park, Chesterfield
Umpires: Hassan Adnan and Gabi Brown

- The Blaze won the toss and elected to field.
- Points: The Blaze 5, Essex 0

Match 70
12 September 2026
10:30
Scorecard

Warwickshire; 279/8 (50 overs)	v	Durham; 280/6 (45.5 overs)
Katie George 101* (108); Lauren Filer 3/53 (10 overs)		Hollie Armitage 107 (119); Alexa Stonehouse 2/52 (7 overs)

Durham won by 4 wickets
Riverside Ground, Chester-le-Street
Umpires: Naeem Ashraf and Anthony Harris

- Durham won the toss and elected to field.
- Points Durham 4, Warwickshire 0

Match 71
9 September 2026
10:30
Scorecard

Yorkshire; 210 (45 overs)	v	Lancashire; 211/3 (41.2 overs)
Lauren Winfield-Hill 90 (101); Fi Morris 3/36 (10 overs)		Eve Jones 77 (97); Claudie Cooper 1/28 (7 overs)

Lancashire won by 7 wickets
Headingley, Leeds
Umpires: Gabi Brown and Gareth Cross

- Lancashire won the toss and elected to field.
- Points: Lancashire 4, Yorkshire 0

Match 72
12 September 2026
10:30
Scorecard

Somerset; 295/7 (50 overs)	v	Surrey; 296/9 (49.3 overs)
Niamh Holland 130* (128); Alice Monaghan 2/54 (10 overs)		Sune Luus 54 (52); Alex Griffiths 5/54 (10 overs)

Surrey won by 1 wicket
The Oval, London
Umpires: Grace Bambury and Rose Dovey

- Surrey won the toss and elected to field.
- Points: Surrey 4, Somerset 0

== League Two ==
=== Round 1 ===
Match 1
12 April 2026
10:30
Scorecard

Derbyshire Falcons; 124/6 (39.3 overs)	v	Middlesex; 121/0 (18.4 overs)
Lauren Kenvyn 35 (61); Saskia Horley 2/33 (9 overs)		Abbie Whybrow 63* (67); Olivia Baker 0/19 (5 overs)

Middlesex won by 10 wickets (DLS method)
County Ground, Derby
Umpires: Amy Coyne and Jane Pratt

- Derbyshire Falcons won the toss and elected to bat.
- Derbyshire Falcons' innings was reduced to 39.3 overs due to rain.
- Middlesex were set a revised target of 119 runs from 26 overs due to rain.
- Points: Middlesex 5, Derbyshire Falcons 0

Match 2
12 April 2026
10:30
Scorecard

Gloucestershire; 185/8 (38 overs)	v	Glamorgan; 188/4 (35.2 overs)
Georgina Start 49 (54); Poppy Walker 3/29 (8 overs)		Lauren Parfitt 56 (70); Liv Daniels 2/40 (8 overs)

Glamorgan won by 6 wickets
Sophia Gardens, Cardiff
Umpires: Kylie White and Dean Daniels

- Glamorgan won the toss and elected to field.
- The match was reduced to 38 overs per side due to rain.
- Points: Glamorgan 4, Gloucestershire 0

Match 3
12 April 2026
10:30
Scorecard

Sussex Sharks; 152/6 (37.4 overs)	v	Leicestershire Foxes; 107/5 (14.4 overs)
Lucy Western 38* (27); Poppy Tulloch 2/23 (4 overs)		Bella Johnson 68* (95); Emma Thatcher 2/17 (5 overs)

Leicestershire Foxes won by 4 wickets (DLS method)
Grace Road, Leicester
Umpires: Kirsty Blackham and Hemal Wijesuriya

- Sussex Sharks won the toss and elected to bat.
- Sussex Sharks innings was reduced to 37.4 overs due to rain.
- Leicestershire Foxes were set a revised target of 107 from 16 overs due to rain.
- Points: Leicestershire Foxes 4, Sussex Sharks 0

Match 4
12 April 2026
10:30
Scorecard

Northamptonshire Steelbacks; 307/8 (50 overs)	v	Kent; 268 (49.5 overs)
Meg Austin 123 (108); Megan Belt 5/50 (10 overs)		Coco Streets 78 (84); Ilenia Sims 3/52 (10 overs)

Northamptonshire Steelbacks won by 39 runs
County Ground, Northampton
Umpires: Rehma Chandaria and Mel Juniper

- Kent won the toss and elected to field.
- Points: Northamptonshire Steelbacks 4, Kent 0

=== Round 2 ===
Match 5
19 April 2026
10:30
Scorecard

Glamorgan; 263/7 (50 overs)	v	Leicestershire Foxes; 210 (46.4 overs)
Lauren Parfitt 73 (93); April Herathge 2/47 (7 overs)		Ellen Watson 60 (79); Anna-Mae Shearn 2/24 (8 overs)

Glamorgan won by 53 runs
Sophia Gardens, Cardiff
Umpires: Kelly Alcock and Sam Hollingshead

- Glamorgan won the toss and elected to bat.
- Points: Glamorgan 5, Leicestershire Foxes 0

Match 6
19 April 2026
10:30
Scorecard

Derbyshire Falcons; 243/6 (50 overs)	v	Kent; 246/6 (41.5 overs)
Frances Lonsdale 103 (124); Amy Gordon 2/47 (10 overs)		Coco Streets 108 (97); Rhiannon Knowling-Davies 2/30 (7 overs)

Kent won by 4 wickets
St Lawrence Ground, Canterbury
Umpires: Martin Saggers and Kylie White

- Derbyshire Falcons won the toss and elected to bat.
- Points: Kent 4, Derbyshire Falcons 0

Match 7
19 April 2026
10:30
Scorecard

Gloucestershire; 172 (42.3 overs)	v	Middlesex; 173/3 (31.4 overs)
Chloe Brewer 60 (74); Saskia Horley 3/24 (8 overs)		Riva Pindoria 70* (92); Chloe Brewer 2/28 (2 overs)

Middlesex won by 7 wickets
Brunton Memorial Ground, Radlett
Umpires: Mel Juniper and Hemal Wijesuriya

- Gloucestershire won the toss and elected to bat.
- Points: Middlesex 5, Gloucestershire 0

Match 8
19 April 2026
10:30
Scorecard

Sussex Sharks; 341/3 (50 overs)	v	Worcestershire Rapids; 186 (44.1 overs)
Izzy Collis 133 (136); Jess Beach 1/55 (9 overs)		Gwenan Davies 52 (56); Chiara Green 4/25 (10 overs)

Sussex Sharks won by 155 runs
County Ground, Hove
Umpires: Rehma Chandaria and Dean Daniels

- Sussex Sharks won the toss and elected to bat.
- Points: Sussex Sharks 5, Worcestershire Rapids 0

=== Round 3 ===
Match 9
3 May 2026
10:30
Scorecard

Gloucestershire; 143 (43 overs)	v	Northamptonshire Steelbacks; 147/4 (27.3 overs)
Becca Halliday 46 (50)		Josie Groves 62* (70); Alice Bird 3/32 (7.3 overs)

Northamptonshire Steelbacks won by 6 wickets
County Ground, Bristol
Umpires: Jonathan Kinsey and Mansoor Qureshi

- Northamptonshire Steelbacks won the toss and elected to field.
- Points: Northamptonshire Steelbacks 5, Gloucestershire 0

Match 10
3 May 2026
10:30
Scorecard

Sussex Sharks; 217 (49.2 overs)	v	Kent; 218/4 (45.2 overs)
Phoebe Wilkinson 74 (98); Sydney Gorham 3/29 (9 overs)		Coco Streets 104* (118); Shristi Patil 1/9 (2 overs)

Kent won by 6 wickets
County Ground, Hove
Umpires: Rehma Chandaria and Hemal Wijesuriya

- Kent won the toss and elected to field.
- points: Kent 4, Sussex Sharks 0

Match 11
3 May 2026
10:30
Scorecard

Worcestershire Rapids; 258/9 (50 overs)	v	Leicestershire Foxes; 245 (48.5 overs)
Sophie Beech 110 (113); Ellie Phillips 5/33 (9 overs)		Francesca Sweet 101 (114); Megan Bishop 3/44 (7.5 overs)

Worcestershire Rapids won by 13 runs
Worcester Royal Grammar School Ground, Worcester
Umpires: Kelly Alcock and Adam Hitchcock

- Worcestershire Rapids won the toss and elected to bat.
- Points: Worcestershire Rapids 4, Leicestershire Foxes 0

Match 12
4 May 2026
10:30
Scorecard

Glamorgan; 238/8 (50 overs)	v	Derbyshire Falcons; 132 (41.5 overs)
Bethan Ellis 75 (108); Rhiannon Knowling-Davies 5/36 (10 overs)		Frances Lonsdale 17 (49); Gemma Porter 4/19 (9.5 overs)

Glamorgan won by 106 runs
Duffield Cricket Club, Duffield
Umpires: Amy Coyne and Mel Juniper

- Derbyshire Falcons won the toss and elected to field.
- Points: Glamorgan 5, Derbyshire Falcons 0

=== Round 4 ===
Match 13
10 May 2026
10:30
Scorecard

Glamorgan; 354/7 (50 overs)	v	Kent; 314 (47.5 overs)
Megan McColl 111* (84); Izzy James 3/68 (10 overs)		Coco Streets 89 (101); Katy Cobb 3/49 (7.5 overs)

Glamorgan won by 40 runs
County Ground, Beckenham
Umpires: Mel Juniper and Aaron Page

- Glamorgan won the toss and elected to bat.
- Points: Glamorgan 4, Kent 0

Match 14
10 May 2026
10:30
Scorecard

Gloucestershire; 230 (45.2 overs)	v	Leicestershire Foxes; 231/5 (43.2 overs)
Lissy Macleod 57 (62); Ellie Phillips 3/35 (7.2 overs)		Caitlin Chissell 46* (75); Charlie Phillips 3/45 (10 overs)

Leicestershire Foxes won by 5 wickets
Grace Road, Leicester
Umpires: Kirsty Blackham and Adam Hitchcock

- Leicestershire Foxes won the toss and elected to field.
- Points: Leicestershire Foxes 4,

Match 15
10 May 2026
10:30
Scorecard

Worcestershire Rapids; 217 (48.5 overs)	v	Middlesex; 220/3 (38.3 overs)
Sanya Khurana 42 (34); Rachana Cambampaty 3/36 (10 overs)		Pippa Sproul 73 (86); Phoebe Brett 2/41 (9 overs)

Middlesex won by 7 wickets
Brunton Memorial Ground, Radlett
Umpires: Kelly Alcock and Dean Daniels

- Worcestershire Rapids won the toss and elected to bat.
- Points: Middlesex 5, Worcestershire Rapids 0

Match 16
10 May 2026
10:30
Scorecard

Sussex Sharks; 268/9 (50 overs)	v	Northamptonshire Steelbacks; 192 (41.1 overs)
Phoebe Wilkinson 88 (126); Ella Phillips 3/53 (10 overs)		Beth Ascott 38 (59); Poppy Tulloch 3/23 (5.1 overs)

Sussex Sharks won by 76 runs
Finedon Dolben Cricket Club, Finedon
Umpires: Lizzie Conder and Hemal Wijesuriya

- Northamptonshire Steelbacks won the toss and elected to field.
- Points: Sussex Sharks 5, Northamptonshire Steelbacks 0

=== Round 5 ===
Match 17
26 July 2026
10:30
Scorecard

Worcestershire Rapids; 304/8 (50 overs)	v	Derbyshire Falcons; 203 (36.3 overs)
Clare Boycott 108 (127); Rhiannon Knowling-Davies 4/41 (9 overs)		Maria Andrews 36 (33); Amy Griffiths 4/31 (6.3 overs)

Worcestershire Rapids won by 101 runs
The Cooper Yard, Denby
Umpires: Kirsty Blackham and Amy Coyne

- Derbyshire Falcons won the toss and elected to field.
- Points: Worcestershire Rapids 5, Derbyshire Falcons 0

Match 18
26 July 2026
10:30
Scorecard

Glamorgan; 239 (45 overs)	v	Sussex Sharks; 241/8 (47.3 overs)
Megan Sturge 63 (89); Anna Buckle 3/46 (8 overs)		Phoebe Wilkinson 53 (71); Gemma Porter 4/31 (10 overs)

Sussex Sharks won by 2 wickets
The Gnoll, Neath
Umpires: Dean Daniels and Bhavin Radia

- Glamorgan won the toss and elected to bat.
- Points: Sussex Sharks 4, Glamorgan 0

Match 19
26 July 2026
10:30
Scorecard

Middlesex; 306/7 (50 overs)	v	Kent; 309/8 (48.2 overs)
Artemis Downer 67* (56); Sydney Gorham 1/45 (10 overs)		Rachel King 106 (84 overs); Saskia Horley 3/55 (9.2 overs)

Kent won by 2 wickets
St Lawrence Ground, Canterbury
Umpires: Lizzie Conder and Mel Juniper

- Middlesex won the toss and elected to bat.
- Points: Kent 4, Middlesex 0

Match 20
26 July 2026
10:30
Scorecard

Northamptonshire Steelbacks; 311/8 (50 overs)	v	Leicestershire Foxes; 311/9 (50 overs)
Amelia Kemp 107 (115); Ellie Phillips 2/49 (10 overs)		Becki Brooker 58 (63); Gemma Marriott 3/53 (9.3 overs)

Match tied
County Ground, Northampton
Umpires: Rehma Chandaria and Hemal Wijesuriya

- Leicestershire Foxes won the toss and elected to field.
- Points: Northamptonshire Steelbacks 2, Leicestershire Foxes 2

=== Round 6 ===
Match 21
2 August 2026
10:30
Scorecard

Glamorgan	v	Northamptonshire Steelbacks

Penrhyn Avenue, Colwyn Bay

Match 22
2 August 2026
10:30
Scorecard

Gloucestershire	v	Derbyshire Falcons

County Ground, Bristol

Match 23
2 August 2026
10:30
Scorecard

Sussex Sharks	v	Middlesex

Arundel Castle Cricket Ground, Arundel

Match 24
2 August 2026
10:30
Scorecard

Worcestershire Rapids	v	Kent

Astwood Bank, Redditch

=== Round 7 ===
Match 25
8 August 2026
10:30
Scorecard

Gloucestershire	v	Sussex Sharks

College Ground, Cheltenham

Match 26
9 August 2026
10:30
Scorecard

Leicestershire Foxes	v	Derbyshire Falcons

Upper Field, Uppingham School

Match 27
9 August 2026
10:30
Scorecard

Middlesex	v	Northamptonshire Steelbacks

Brunton Memorial Ground, Radlett, Hertfordshire

Match 28
9 August 2026
10:30
Scorecard

Worcestershire Rapids	v	Glamorgan

St Godwalds Park, Bromsgrove

=== Round 8 ===
Match 29
16 August 2026
10:30
Scorecard

Gloucestershire	v	Kent

College Ground, Cheltenham

Match 30
16 August 2026
10:30
Scorecard

Leicestershire Foxes	v	Middlesex

Kibworth Cricket Club New Ground, Kibworth

Match 31
16 August 2026
10:30
Scorecard

Northamptonshire Steelbacks	v	Worcestershire Rapids

County Ground, Northampton

Match 32
16 August 2026
10:30
Scorecard

Sussex Sharks	v	Derbyshire Falcons

Cricket Field Road, Horsham

=== Round 9 ===
Match 33
6 September 2026
10:30
Scorecard

Derbyshire Falcons	v	Northamptonshire Steelbacks

Christchurch Meadows, Belper

Match 34
6 September 2026
10:30
Scorecard

Kent	v	Leicestershire Foxes

St Lawrence Ground, Canterbury

Match 35
6 September 2026
10:30
Scorecard

Middlesex	v	Glamorgan

Brunton Memorial Ground, Radlett, Hertfordshire

Match 36
6 September 2026
10:30
Scorecard

Worcestershire Rapids	v	Gloucestershire

Matley Cricket Club, Worcestershire

== Knockout stage ==
=== League One ===
Eliminator			Final
			1	The Blaze	254/7 (50 overs)
2	Hampshire	303/5 (50 overs)	EW	Hampshire	251/9 (50 overs)
3	Surrey	109 (27.3 overs)

Eliminator
16 September 2026
12:30 (D/N)
Scorecard

Hampshire; 303/5 (50 overs)	v	Surrey; 109 (27.3 overs)
Maia Bouchier 117* (122); Sune Luus 2/43 (10 overs)		Rachel King 34 (40); Amanda-Jade Wellington 5/19 (6.3 overs)

Hampshire won by 194 runs
Rose Bowl, Southampton
Umpires: Rose Dovey and Sam Hollingshead

- Surrey won the toss and elected to field.

Final
19 September 2026
10:30
- Scorecard

Hampshire; 251/9 (50 overs)	v	The Blaze; 254/7 (50 overs)
Ella McCaughan 78 (97); Lucy Higham 4/49 (10)		Tammy Beaumont 74 (122); Amanda-Jade Wellington 3/36 (10)

The Blaze won by 3 wickets
Rose Bowl, Southampton
Attendance: 3484
Umpires: Anna Harris and Simon Widdup
Match referee: Helen Pack
Player of the match: Lucy Higham (The Blaze)

- The Blaze won the toss and elected to field.

=== League Two ===
Semi-finals
Middlesex	169
Northamptonshire Steelbacks	135
Glamorgan
Kent

Final
SF1W	Middlesex
SF2W	Glamorgan

==== Semi-finals ====
Semi-final 1
13 September 2026
10:30
Scorecard

Middlesex; 169 (41 overs)	v	Northamptonshire Steelbacks; 135 (32.5 overs)
Abbie Whybrow 75 (75); Amelia Kemp 2/19 (6 overs)		Chloe Hill 46 (81); Saskia Horley 4/27 (8.5 overs)

Middlesex won by 29 runs (DLS method)
Brunton Memorial Ground, Radlett
Umpires: Rehma Chandaria and Hemal Wijesuriya

- Northamptonshire Steelbacks won the toss and elected to field.
- The match was reduced to 45 overs per side due to rain.

Semi-final 2
13 September 2026
10:30
Scorecard

Glamorgan	v	Kent

Match Abandoned without a ball bowled (Glamorgan win by better record in qualifying)
Sophia Gardens, Cardiff

Final
20 September 2026
10:30
Scorecard

Middlesex	v	Glamorgan

Middlesex won by 67 runs
Seat Unique Stadium
Attendance: 454

- Glamorgan won the toss and elected to bowl first
