= 2026 Women's T20 Blast =

Women's T20 cricket tournament in England

The 2026 Women's T20 Blast (also known as 2026 Women's Vitality Blast for sponsorship reasons) was the second season of the Women's T20 Blast, a professional Twenty20 cricket competition in England and Wales. The tournament was held from 22 May to 17 July 2026, with eighteen county teams taking part.

Women's T20 Blast League One was won by The Blaze and the League Two was by Glamorgan respectively.

== Format ==
The tournament was split into two categories: League One and League Two, with both tiers featuring the 9 teams with Yorkshire awarded Tier 1 status. In Tier 1 each county played 12 group stage matches: six home and six away. They played four counties twice and four counties once, and in Tier 2, each county played eight group-stage matches: four at home and four away. They played each county either at home or away. The top four counties at the end of the group stage of Tier 1 progressed to Finals Day, which will include two semi-finals and the final, and for Tier 2 the top three counties at the end of the group stage progressed to League 2 Finals Day, which included an eliminator and final.

== Teams ==
- League One (Tier 1): Durham, Essex, Hampshire Hawks, Lancashire Thunder, Somerset, Surrey, The Blaze, Warwickshire Bears, Yorkshire.
- League Two (Tier 2): Derbyshire Falcons, Glamorgan, Gloucestershire, Kent, Leicestershire Foxes, Middlesex, Northamptonshire Steelbacks, Sussex Sharks, Worcestershire Rapids.

== League One ==
2026 Women's Vitality Blast (League One)
- Dates: 22 May – 17 July 2026
- Administrator: England and Wales Cricket Board
- Cricket format: Twenty20
- Host(s): England; Wales
- Champions: The Blaze (1st title)
- Participants: 9
- Matches: 57
- Official website: Vitality Blast

=== Points table ===
Pos	Team	Pld	W	L	T	NR	BP	Pts	NRR	Qualification
1	Hampshire Hawks	12	8	2	2	0	4	40	1.052	Advance to the semi-final
2	Surrey	12	8	3	1	0	3	37	0.625	Advance to the semi-final
3	The Blaze	12	8	4	0	0	2	34	0.232	Advance to the semi-final
4	Durham	12	7	4	0	1	1	31	0.460	Advance to the semi-final
5	Essex	12	6	6	0	0	2	26	−0.383	Eliminated
6	Somerset	12	5	6	1	0	1	23	−0.113	Eliminated
7	Yorkshire	12	3	8	0	1	1	15	−0.646	Eliminated
8	Warwickshire Bears	12	3	9	0	0	2	14	−0.525	Eliminated
9	Lancashire Thunder	12	3	9	0	0	1	13	−0.755	Eliminated

Source: Cricinfo

=== Points summary ===
Team	Group matches												Play-offs	
Team	1	2	3	4	5	6	7	8	9	10	11	12	SF	F
Durham	4	4	8	12	16	18	22	22	27	31	31	31	W	L
Essex	5	5	9	13	13	13	13	13	17	17	21	26	—	—
Hampshire Hawks	2	2	6	8	13	18	23	27	32	36	40	40	L	—
Lancashire Thunder	0	0	5	5	5	5	5	9	9	9	9	13	—	—
Somerset	2	6	11	11	15	19	19	19	19	23	23	23	—	—
Surrey	4	9	13	15	15	19	19	23	28	28	33	37	L	—
The Blaze	4	8	12	12	16	20	25	25	25	25	30	34	W	W
Warwickshire Bears	0	0	0	0	0	0	5	9	13	13	13	14	—	—
Yorkshire	0	0	0	0	0	2	2	2	6	10	15	15	—	—

Win	Loss	Tie	No result	Eliminated

- Note: The total points at the end of each group match are listed.
- Note: Click on the points or results to see the match summary.

=== Round-robin ===
==== May ====
Match 1
22 May 2026
14:00
Scorecard

Warwickshire Bears; 164/8 (20 overs)	v	Essex; 166/3 (14.2 overs)
Abigail Freeborn 86* (56); Jodi Grewcock 2/27 (3.2 overs)		Cordelia Griffith 68 (37); Millie Taylor 1/24 (3 overs)

Essex won by 7 wickets
County Ground, Chelmsford
Umpires: Dean Daniels and Mohammed Waseem

- Essex won the toss and elected to field.
- Points: Essex 5, Warwickshire Bears 0

Match 2
22 May 2026
14:15
Scorecard

Lancashire Thunder; 185/7 (20 overs)	v	Surrey; 191/4 (18.5 overs)
Eve Jones 56 (31); Alice Monaghan 2/32 (4 overs)		Bryony Smith 71 (35); Grace Potts 2/31 (4 overs)

Surrey won by 6 wickets
The Oval, London
Umpires: Sam Hollingshead and James Tredwell

- Lancashire Thunder won the toss and elected to bat.
- Points: Surrey 4, Lancashire Thunder 0

Match 3
22 May 2026
14:30
Scorecard

Somerset; 159/6 (20 overs)	v	Hampshire Hawks; 159/5 (20 overs)
Anika Learoyd 61* (49); Georgia Adams 3/24 (4 overs)		Ella McCaughan 69 (46); Niamh Holland 4/21 (4 overs)

Match tied
County Ground, Taunton
Umpires: Rose Fernando and Surendiran Shanmugam
Player of the match: Niamh Holland (Somerset)

- Somerset won the toss and elected to bat.
- Points: Somerset 2, Hampshire Hawks 2

Match 4
22 May 2026
14:30
Scorecard

Yorkshire; 179/5 (20 overs)	v	The Blaze; 181/6 (19.3 overs)
Jess Jonassen 52 (29); Charley Phillips 3/31 (4 overs)		Charli Knott 57 (29); Holly Garton 3/23 (4 overs)

The Blaze won by 4 wickets
Trent Bridge, Nottingham
Umpires: Graeme Cross and Simon Widdup

- Yorkshire won the toss and elected to bat.
- Points: The Blaze 4, Yorkshire 0

Match 5
24 May 2026
11:30
Scorecard

Durham; 178/5 (20 overs)	v	Hampshire Hawks; 146/8 (20 overs)
Hollie Armitage 64 (49); Poppy Tulloch 2/38 (4 overs)		Rhianna Southby 33* (21); Naomi Dattani 33 (21); Katie Levick 2/28 (4 overs)

Durham won by 32 runs
Riverside Ground, Chester-le-Street
Umpires: Naeem Ashraf and Michael Gough

- Durham won the toss and elected to bat.
- Points: Durham 4, Hampshire Hawks 0.

Match 6
24 May 2026
11:30
Scorecard

Warwickshire Bears; 166/9 (20 overs)	v	Somerset; 167/3 (18.3 overs)
Meg Austin 41 (29); Erin Vukusic 3/32 (4 overs)		Anika Learoyd 60* (49); Phoebe Brett 2/31 (3 overs)

Somerset won by 7 wickets
Edgbaston, Birmingham
Umpires: Sam Hollingshead and Ben Peverall

- Warwickshire Bears won the toss and elected to bat.
- Points: Somerset 4, Warwickshire Bears 0

Match 7
24 May 2026
11:30
Scorecard

Yorkshire; 133 (20 overs)	v	Surrey; 134/6 (15.3 overs)
Erin Thomas 42 (29); Kalea Moore 3/21 (4 overs)		Alice Davidson-Richards 29 (16); Jess Jonassen 3/25 (4 overs)

Surrey won by 4 wickets
Headingley, Leeds
Umpires: Neil Pratt and Mohammed Waseem

- Yorkhsire won the toss and elected to bat.
- Points: Surrey 5, Yorkshire 0

Match 8
25 May 2026
10:30
Scorecard

Lancashire Thunder; 162/5 (20 overs)	v	The Blaze; 163/7 (19.3 overs)
Meg Lanning 81* (49); Grace Ballinger 2/14 (4 overs)		Tammy Beaumont 54 (29); Fi Morris 3/25 (4 overs)

The Blaze won by 3 wickets
Old Trafford, Manchester
Umpires: Naeem Ashraf and Graeme Cross

- The Blaze won the toss and elected to field.
- Points: The Blaze 4, Lancashire Thunder 0

Match 9
26 May 2026
15:00
Scorecard

Hampshire Hawks; 160/7 (20 overs)	v	Essex; 137/9 (20 overs)
Naomi Dattani 31 (24); Kate Coppack 4/18 (4 overs)		Jodi Grewcock 57* (43); Georgia Adams 2/36 (4 overs)

Hampshire Hawks won by 23 runs
Rose Bowl, Southampton
Umpires: Rose Fernando and Ben Peverall
Player of the match: Naomi Dattani (Hampshire Hawks)

- Hampshire Hawks won the toss and elected to bat.
- Points: Hampshire Hawks 4, Essex 0

Match 10
27 May 2026
14:30
Scorecard

Warwickshire Bears; 158/8 (20 overs)	v	The Blaze; 159/6 (19.2 overs)
Abigail Freeborn 56 (45); Grace Ballinger 3/24 (4 overs)		Marie Kelly 45 (32); Mary Taylor 3/22 (4 overs)

The Blaze won by 4 wickets
Edgbaston, Birmingham
Umpires: Paul Baldwin and Grace Bambury

- The Blaze won the toss and elected to field.
- Points: The Blaze 4, Warwickshire Bears 0.

Match 11
27 May 2026
18:30 (D/N)
Scorecard

Durham; 102 (17 overs)	v	Surrey; 103/8 (16.4 overs)
Bess Heath 28 (25); Ryana MacDonald-Gay 6/11 (4 overs)		Jemima Spence 24 (17); Heather Graham 3/19 (4 overs)

Surrey won by 2 wickets
The Oval, London
Umpires: Gabi Brown and Chris Watts

- Surrey won the toss and elected to field.
- Points: Surrey 4, Durham 0

Match 12
27 May 2026
14:30
Scorecard

Somerset; 177/5 (20 overs)	v	Yorkshire; 138/9 (20 overs)
Sophie Luff 57 (35); Beth Langston 1/23 (4 overs)		Sterre Kalis 51 (35); Lola Harris 3/17 (4 overs)

Somerset won by 39 runs
County Ground, Taunton
Umpires: Anthony Harris and Sam Hollingshead

- Yorkshire won the toss and elected to field.
- Points: Somerset 5, Yorkshire 0

Match 13
29 May 2026
14:30
Scorecard

Durham; 140/5 (20 overs)	v	Warwickshire Bears; 113 (18.1 overs)
Bess Heath 61 (39); Alexa Stonehouse 1/15 (4 overs)		Chloe Brewer 26 (23); Sophia Turner 2/13 (3.1 overs)

Durham won by 27 runs
Riverside Ground, Chester-le-Street
Umpires: Graeme Cross and Mohammed Waseem

- Durham won the toss and elected to bat.
- Points: Durham 4, Warwickshire Bears 0

Match 14
29 May 2026
14:30
Scorecard

Somerset; 137/6 (20 overs)	v	Lancashire Thunder; 138/3 (15.3 overs)
Sophie Luff 42 (31); Hannah Jones 3/20 (4 overs)		Meg Lanning 75* (48); Erin Vukusic 3/30 (4 overs)

Lancashire Thunder won by 7 wickets
Old Trafford, Manchester
Umpires: Naeem Ashraf and Sam Hollingshead

- Somerset won the toss and elected to bat.
- Points: Lancashire Thunder 5, Somerset 0

Match 15
29 May 2026
18:30 (D/N)
Scorecard

Essex; 146/7 (20 overs)	v	Yorkshire; 143 (19.4 overs)
Grace Scrivens 53 (40); Jess Jonassen 2/23 (4 overs)		Ami Campbell 26 (22); Eva Gray 3/25 (4 overs)

Essex won by 3 runs
Headingley, Leeds
Umpires: Gabi Brown and Ben Peverall

- Essex won the toss and elected to bat.
- Points: Essex 4, Yorkshire 0

Match 16
29 May 2026
15:00
Scorecard

Surrey; 121 (20 overs)	v	Hampshire Hawks; 121/8 (20 overs)
Alice Davidson-Richards 40 (38); Amanda-Jade Wellington 3/25 (4 overs)		Nancy Harman 43 (26); Ryana MacDonald-Gay 2/20 (4 overs)

Match tied
Rose Bowl, Southampton
Umpires: Ian Blackwell and Julia Jarvis

- Surrey won the toss and elected to bat.
- Points: Surrey 2, Hampshire Hawks 2

Match 17
31 May 2026
11:30
Scorecard

Lancashire Thunder; 128/8 (20 overs)	v	Essex; 132/4 (17.5 overs)
Eleanor Threlkeld 26 (24); Grace Scrivens 3/23 (4 overs)		Alice Macleod 54* (39); Vinali Weerappuli 2/28 (3.5 overs)

Essex won by 6 wickets
County Ground, Chelmsford
Umpires: Julia Jarvis and Mohammed Waseem

- Essex won the toss and elected to field.
- Points: Essex 4, Lancashire Thunder 0

Match 18
31 May 2026
10:00
Scorecard

Surrey; 153/5 (20 overs)	v	Somerset; 154/6 (19.3 overs)
Jemima Spence 51* (35); Olivia Barnes 3/21 (4 overs)		Sophie Luff 82* (53); Alice Monaghan 3/24 (4 overs)

Somerset won by 4 wickets
The Oval, London
Umpires: Sam Hollingshead and Simon Widdup

- Somerset won the toss and elected to field.
- Points: Somerset 4, Surrey 0

Match 19
31 May 2026
12:15
Scorecard

The Blaze; 153 (19.5 overs)	v	Durham; 156/3 (19.1 overs)
Georgia Elwiss 31 (24); Mady Villiers 3/21 (3.5 overs)		Hollie Armitage 50* (47); Emma Jones 2/21 (3 overs)

Durham won by 7 wickets
Trent Bridge, Nottingham
Umpires: Gabi Brown and Graeme Cross

- Durham won the toss and elected to field.
- Points: Durham 4, The Blaze 0

==== June ====
Match 20
5 June 2026
15:00
Scorecard

Durham; 155/6 (20 overs)	v	Yorkshire; 134/8 (20 overs)
Bess Heath 36 (25); Claudie Cooper 2/17 (2 overs)		Alice Clarke 32 (26); Heather Graham 3/31 (4 overs)

Durham won by 21 runs
Headingley, Leeds
Umpires: Naeem Ashraf and Gabi Brown

- Durham won the toss and elected to bat.
- Points: Durham 4, Yorkshire 0

Match 21
5 June 2026
14:00
Scorecard

Essex; 145/6 (20 overs)	v	Surrey; 149/5 (17.4 overs)
Grace Scrivens 85 (63); Kalea Moore 2/19 (4 overs)		Jemima Spence 52 (31); Eva Gray 2/22 (3.4 overs)

Surrey won by 5 wickets
The Oval, London
Umpires: Sam Hollingshead and Julia Jarvis

- Surrey won the toss and elected to field.
- Points: Surrey 4, Essex 0

Match 22
5 June 2026
14:30
Scorecard

The Blaze; 151/7 (20 overs)	v	Warwickshire Bears; 140/5 (20 overs)
Emma Jones 32 (22); Georgia Davis 3/23 (4 overs)		Meg Austin 74 (51); Grace Ballinger 2/20 (4 overs)

The Blaze won by 11 runs
Trent Bridge, Nottingham
Umpires: Rose Fernando and Mohammed Waseem

- Warwickshire Bears won the toss and elected to field.
- Points: The Blaze 4, Warwickshire Bears 0

Match 23
7 June 2026
14:00
Scorecard

Hampshire Hawks; 155/4 (20 overs)	v	Essex; 100/9 (20 overs)
Maia Bouchier 87 (55); Grace Scrivens 2/33 (4 overs)		Jodi Grewcock 30 (34); Amanda-Jade Wellington 5/18 (4 overs)

Hampshire Hawks won by 55 runs
County Ground, Chelmsford
Umpires: Rose Fernando and Julia Jarvis

- Essex won the toss and elected to field.
- Points: Hampshire Hawks 5, Essex 0

Match 24
7 June 2026
11:30
Scorecard

Warwickshire Bears; 123/8 (20 overs)	v	Somerset; 126/5 (16.2 overs)
Meg Austin 31 (26); Olivia Barnes 2/20 (4 overs)		Niamh Holland 42 (31); Mary Taylor 1/10 (2 overs)

Somerset won by 5 wickets
County Ground, Taunton
Umpires: Anthony Harris and Ben Peverall

- Warwickshire Bears won the toss and elected to bat.
- Points: Somerset 4, Warwickshire Bears 0

Match 25
7 June 2026
11:00
Scorecard

The Blaze; 135/9 (20 overs)	v	Lancashire Thunder; 120 (19.1 overs)
Tammy Beaumont 59 (40); Grace Potts 5/20 (4 overs)		Ellie Threlkeld 49 (36); Charli Knott 4/17 (4 overs)

The Blaze won by 15 runs
Trent Bridge, Nottingham
Umpires: Gabi Brown and Mohammed Waseem

- Lancashire Thunder won the toss and elected to field.
- Points: The Blaze 4, Lancashire Thunder 0.

Match 26
9 June 2026
14:30
Scorecard

Yorkshire {{{score1}}}	v	Durham {{{score2}}}

No result
Riverside Ground, Chester-le-Street
Umpires: Anthony Harris and Simon Widdup

- Durham won the toss and elected to field.
- No play was possible due to rain.
- Points: Durham 2, Yorkshire 2

Match 27
9 June 2026
14:30
Scorecard

Lancashire Thunder; 130/7 (20 overs)	v	Hampshire Hawks; 133/2 (15.5 overs)
Meg Lanning 64 (51); Naomi Dattani 2/19 (4 overs)		Maia Bouchier 74* (53); Grace Potts 1/19 (3.5 overs)

Hampshire Hawks won by 8 wickets
Stanley Park, Blackpool
Umpires: Paul Baldwin and Gabi Brown

- Hampshire Hawks won the toss and elected to field.
- Points: Hampshire Hawks 5, Lancashire Thunder 0

Match 28
26 June 2026
15:00
Scorecard

Warwickshire Bears; 172/5 (20 overs)	v	Surrey; 130 (20 overs)
Abigail Freeborn 51 (33); Anna Buckle 2/35 (4 overs)		Alice Davidson-Richards 39 (36); Mary Taylor 3/24 (4 overs)

Warwickshire Bears won by 42 runs
Edgbaston, Birmingham
Umpires: Graeme Cross and Graham Lloyd

- Warwickshire Bears won the toss and elected to bat.
- Points: Warwickshire Bears 5, Surrey 0

Match 29
26 June 2026
14:30
Scorecard

Somerset; 155/7 (20 overs)	v	Durham; 158/4 (19.1 overs)
Sophie Luff 56 (38); Mady Villiers 4/28 (4 overs)		Hollie Armitage 65* (45); Chloe Skelton 2/30 (4 overs)

Durham won by 6 wickets
County Ground, Taunton
Umpires: Anthony Harris and Sam Hollingshead

- Somerset won the toss and elected to bat.
- Points: Durham 4, Somerset 0

Match 30
26 June 2026
15:00
Scorecard

Hampshire Hawks; 174/5 (20 overs)	v	Yorkshire; 132/7 (20 overs)
Maia Bouchier 44 (28); Olivia Thomas 2/28 (4 overs)		Lauren Winfield-Hill 39 (31); Georgia Adams 39 (31)

Hampshire Hawks won by 42 runs
Rose Bowl, Southampton
Umpires: Julia Jarvis and Mohammed Waseem

- Hampshire Hawks won the toss and elected to bat.
- Points: Hampshire Hawks 5, Yorkshire 0

Match 31
28 June 2026
14:00
Scorecard

Essex; 136/9 (20 overs)	v	The Blaze; 137/1 (15.5 overs)
Liberty Heap 46 (31); Lucy Higham 3/24 (4 overs)		Marie Kelly 55* (44); Esmae MacGregor 1/29 (3 overs)

The Blaze won by 9 wickets
County Ground, Chelmsford
Umpires: Naeem Ashraf and Ben Debenham

- The Blaze won the toss and elected to field.
- Points: The Blaze 5, Essex 0

Match 32
28 June 2026
14:30
Scorecard

Warwickshire Bears; 160/9 (20 overs)	v	Lancashire Thunder; 159/8 (20 overs)
Natasha Wraith 83 (48); Sophie Morris 3/23 (4 overs)		Tilly Kesteven 73 (55); Millie Taylor 2/23 (4 overs)

Warwickshire Bears won by 1 run
Stanley Park, Blackpool
Umpires: Graeme Cross and Simon Widdup

- Warwickshire Bears won the toss and elected to bat.
- Points: Warwickshire Bears 4, Lancashire Thunder 0

Match 33
28 June 2026
14:30
Scorecard

Somerset; 148/6 (20 overs)	v	Surrey; 152/8 (19.2 overs)
Sophie Luff 52 (39); Laura Harris 3/16 (3 overs)		Bryony Smith 63 (51); Niamh Holland 3/22 (4 overs)

Surrey won by 2 wickets
County Ground, Taunton
Umpires: Ben Peverall and Mohammed Waseem

- Surrey won the toss and elected to field.
- Points: Surrey 4, Somerset 0

Match 34
28 June 2026
14:30
Scorecard

Durham; 128/7 (20 overs)	v	Hampshire Hawks; 131/2 (16.2 overs)
Emily Windsor 30 (29); Bex Tyson 2/24 (4 overs)		Maia Bouchier 63 (45); Katie Levick 1/17 (3 overs)

Hampshire Hawks won by 8 wickets
Rose Bowl, Southampton
Umpires: Sam Hollingshead and Kylie White

- Durham won the toss and elected to field.
- Points: Hampshire Hawks 4, Durham 0

==== July ====
Match 35
1 July 2026
15:00
Scorecard

Essex; 116/8 (20 overs)	v	Warwickshire Bears; 119/5 (16 overs)
Jo Gardner 33 (32); Amu Surenkumar 3/22 (3 overs)		Georgia Redmayne 43* (41); Eva Gray 3/29 (4 overs)

Warwickshire Bears won by 5 wickets
Edgbaston, Birmingham
Umpires: Graeme Cross and Simon Widdup

- Essex won the toss and elected to bat.
- Points: Warwickshire Bears 4, Essex 0

Match 36
1 July 2026
14:30
Scorecard

Yorkshire; 160/7 (20 overs)	v	Lancashire Thunder; 163/4 (17.1 overs)
Ami Campbell 47 (21); Vinali Weerappuli 3/13 (4 overs)		Eve Jones 57 (38); Jess Jonassen 1/14 (3 overs)

Lancashire Thunder won by 6 wickets
Clifton Park, York
Umpires: Surendiran Shanmugam and Mohammed Waseem

- Lancashire Thunder won the toss and elected to field.
- Points: Lancashire Thunder 4, Yorkshire 0

Match 37
3 July 2026
18:30 (D/N)
Scorecard

Lancashire Thunder; 79 (19.3 overs)	v	Durham; 80/3 (13.3 overs)
Darcey Carter 32* (42); Trudy Johnson 3/7 (4 overs)		Hollie Armitage 44* (33); Vinali Weerappuli 2/18 (4 overs)

Durham won by 7 wickets
Riverside Ground, Chester-le-Street
Umpires: Neil Pratt and Mohammed Waseem

- Durham won the toss and elected to field.
- Points: Durham 5, Lancashire Thunder 0

Match 38
3 July 2026
14:30
Scorecard

Yorkshire; 210/4 (20 overs)	v	Somerset; 199/5 (20 overs)
Lauren Winfield-Hill 99 (55); Maddie Russell 3/43 (4 overs)		Anika Learoyd 103* (49); Sarah Glenn 2/30 (4 overs)

Yorkshire won by 11 runs
Headingley, Leeds
Umpires: Naeem Ashraf and Graeme Cross

- Somerset won the toss and elected to field.
- Points: Yorkshire 4, Somerset 0

Match 39
3 July 2026
14:30
Scorecard

Surrey; 155/9 (20 overs)	v	The Blaze; 121 (19 overs)
Phoebe Franklin 46 (30); Charli Knott 6/25 (4 overs)		Tammy Beaumont 37 (36); Kalea Moore 5/22 (4 overs)

Surrey won by 34 runs
Trent Bridge, Nottingham
Umpires: Paul Baldwin and Anthony Harris
Player of the match: Kalea Moore (Surrey)

- Surrey won the toss and elected to bat.
- Points: Surrey 5, The Blaze 0

Match 40
5 July 2026
11:30
Scorecard

Surrey; 184/4 (20 overs)	v	Essex; 185/1 (19.1 overs)
Jemima Spence 69* (41); Sophia Smale 2/28 (4 overs)		Anneke Bosch 84* (54)

Essex won by 9 wickets
County Ground, Chelmsford
Umpires: Paul Baldwin and Julia Jarvis

- Essex won the toss and elected to field.
- Points: Essex 4, Surrey 0

Match 41
5 July 2026
11:30
Scorecard

The Blaze; 147/9 (20 overs)	v	Durham; 148/5 (19.2 overs)
Marie Kelly 37 (26); Mady Villiers 4/14 (4 overs)		Hollie Armitage 69* (47); Kirstie Gordon 1/18 (4 overs)

Durham won by 5 wickets
Riverside Ground, Chester-le-Street
Umpires: Graeme Cross and Steve O'Shaughnessy

- Durham won the toss and elected to field.
- Points: Durham 4, The Blaze 0

Match 42
5 July 2026
11:30
Scorecard

Warwickshire Bears; 161/3 (20 overs)	v	Yorkshire; 165/5 (19.3 overs)
Abigail Freeborn 65 (49); Jessica Woolston 1/17 (3 overs)		Jess Jonassen 65 (40); Em Arlott 2/27 (3.3 overs)

Yorkshire won by 5 wickets
Edgbaston, Birmingham
Umpires: Sam Hollingshead and Mohammed Waseem

- Warwickshire Bears won the toss and elected to bat.
- Points: Yorkshire 4, Warwickshire Bears 0

Match 43
5 July 2026
11:30
Scorecard

Lancashire Thunder; 131 (19.4 overs)	v	Hampshire Hawks; 132/1 (14.3 overs)
Emma Lamb 30 (26); Nancy Harman 3/9 (1.3 overs)		Maia Bouchier 77* (45); Hannah Jones 1/27 (3.3 overs)

Hampshire Hawks won by 9 wickets
Rose Bowl, Southampton
Umpires: Dean Daniels and Ben Peverall

- Hampshire Hawks won the toss and elected to field.
- Points: Hampshire Hawks 4, Lancashire Thunder 0

Match 44
7 July 2026
18:00 (D/N)
Scorecard

Essex; 177/5 (20 overs)	v	Somerset; 178/8 (19.5 overs)
Grace Scrivens 73 (51); Erin Vukusic 3/31 (4 overs)		Niamh Holland 92* (52); Esmae MacGregor 4/26 (3.5 overs)

Somerset won by 2 wickets
County Ground, Chelmsford
Umpires: Rose Fernando and Sam Hollingshead

- Somerset won the toss and elected to field.
- Points: Somerset 4, Essex 0

Match 45
8 July 2026
14:15
Scorecard

Warwickshire Bears; 180/5 (20 overs)	v	Surrey; 183/4 (15 overs)
Abigail Freeborn 50 (43); Alice Monaghan 2/33 (3 overs)		Laura Harris 81 (32); Millie Taylor 2/27 (2 overs)

Surrey won by 6 wickets
The Oval, London
Umpires: Julia Jarvis and James Tredwell

- Surrey won the toss and elected to field.
- Points: Surrey 4, Warwickshire Bears 0

Match 46
8 July 2026
15:00
Scorecard

Hampshire Hawks; 151/8 (20 overs)	v	The Blaze; 128/8 (20 overs)
Georgia Adams 49 (30); Charli Knott 3/22 (4 overs)		Marie Kelly 33 (20); Georgia Adams 4/16 (4 overs)

Hampshire Hawks won by 23 runs
Rose Bowl, Southampton
Umpires: Rose Fernando and Mohammed Waseem

- Hampshire Hawks won the toss and elected to bat.
- Points: Hampshire Hawks 4, The Blaze 0

Match 47
10 July 2026
14:30
Scorecard

Essex; 162/4 (20 overs)	v	Durham; 150/6 (20 overs)
Grace Scrivens 85 (64); Katherine Fraser 1/17 (4 overs)		Hollie Armitage 43 (41); Eva Gray 2/27 (4 overs)

Essex won by 12 runs
Riverside Ground, Chester-le-Street
Umpires: Graeme Cross and David Millns

- Essex won the toss and elected to bat.
- Points: Essex 4, Durham 0

Match 48
10 July 2026
15:00
Scorecard

Warwickshire Bears; 166/5 (20 overs)	v	Hampshire Hawks; 167/6 (19 overs)
Katie George 67 (49); Georgia Adams 2/21 (4 overs)		Georgia Adams 53 (29); Mary Taylor 3/29 (4 overs)

Hampshire Hawks won by 4 wickets
Edgbaston, Birmingham
Umpires: Anthony Harris and Sam Hollingshead

- Hampshire Hawks won the toss and elected to field.
- Points: Hampshire Hawks 4, Warwickshire Bears 0

Match 49
10 July 2026
15:00
Scorecard

Yorkshire; 162/8 (20 overs)	v	Lancashire Thunder; 133/8 (20 overs)
Ami Campbell 64 (42); Darcey Carter 2/22 (4 overs)		Kate Cross 28* (20); Holly Garton 3/23 (4 overs)

Yorkshire won by 29 runs
Old Trafford, Manchester
Umpires: Rose Fernando and Simon Widdup

- Lancashire Thunder won the toss and elected to field.
- Points: Yorkshire 5, Lancashire Thunder 0

Match 50
10 July 2026
14:30
Scorecard

Somerset; 118/8 (20 overs)	v	The Blaze; 122/3 (14.2 overs)
Charlie Dean 41 (32); Lucy Higham 2/6 (2 overs)		Charli Knott 63* (43); Charlie Dean 3/24 (4 overs)

The Blaze won by 7 wickets
Trent Bridge, Nottingham
Umpires: Paul Pollard and Mohammed Waseem

- Somerset won the toss and elected to bat.
- Points: The Blaze 5, Somerset 0

Match 51
12 July 2026
11:30
Scorecard

Durham; 132/6 (20 overs)	v	Lancashire Thunder; 135/6 (19.4 overs)
Hollie Armitage 30 (27); Vinali Weerappuli 2/20 (4 overs)		Skye Thomas 55* (38); Sophia Turner 2/20 (3.4 overs)

Lancashire Thunder won by 4 wickets
Old Trafford, Manchester
Umpires: Naeem Ashraf and Mohammed Waseem

- Durham won the toss and elected to bat.
- Points: Lancashire Thunder 4, Durham 0

Match 52
12 July 2026
11:30
Scorecard

Yorkshire; 122 (19.5 overs)	v	The Blaze; 123/7 (19.1 overs)
Lauren Winfield-Hill 29 (22); Grace Ballinger 3/31 (3.5 overs)		Charli Knott 84* (57); Holly Garton 2/17 (4 overs)

The Blaze won by 3 wickets
Headingley, Leeds
Umpires: Graeme Cross and Rose Fernando

- Yorkshire won the toss and elected to bat.
- Points: The Blaze 4, Yorkshire 0

Match 53
12 July 2026
14:00
Scorecard

Hampshire Hawks; 132/8 (20 overs)	v	Surrey; 136/4 (17.4 overs)
Abi Norgrove 52* (46); Ryana MacDonald-Gay 3/13 (4 overs)		Phoebe Franklin 40* (36); Georgia Adams 2/21 (4 overs)

Surrey won by 6 wickets
The Oval, London
Umpires: Anthony Harris and Sam Hollingshead

- Hampshire Hawks won the toss and elected to bat.
- Points: Surrey 4, Hampshire Hawks 0

Match 54
12 July 2026
14:30
Scorecard

Essex; 163/9 (20 overs)	v	Somerset; 122 (20 overs)
Liberty Heap 37 (31); Charlie Dean 3/36 (4 overs)		Jess Hazell 37* (28); Eva Gray 2/11 (3 overs)

Essex won by 41 runs
County Ground, Taunton
Umpires: Hassan Adnan and Julia Jarvis

- Essex won the toss and elected to bat.
- Points: Essex 5, Somerset 0

== League Two ==
2026 Women's Vitality Blast (League Two)
- Dates: 22 May – 12 July 2026
- Administrator: England and Wales Cricket Board
- Cricket format: Twenty20
- Host(s): England; Wales
- Champions: Glamorgan (1st title)
- Participants: 9
- Matches: 38
- Most runs: Lauren Parfitt (374)
- Most wickets: Gemma Porter (17)
- Official website: Vitality Blast

=== Points table ===
Pos	Team	Pld	W	L	T	NR	BP	Pts	NRR	Qualification
1	Glamorgan	8	7	1	0	0	4	32	1.967	Advanced to Final
2	Kent	8	5	3	0	0	3	23	0.088	Advanced to Eliminator
3	Gloucestershire	8	5	3	0	0	3	23	0.026	Advanced to Eliminator
4	Middlesex	8	5	3	0	0	2	22	0.442	Eliminated
5	Worcestershire Rapids	8	4	4	0	0	1	17	−0.525	Eliminated
6	Northamptonshire Steelbacks	8	3	5	0	0	2	14	0.073	Eliminated
7	Leicestershire Foxes	8	3	5	0	0	0	12	−0.280	Eliminated
8	Sussex Sharks	8	2	6	0	0	1	9	−0.164	Eliminated
9	Derbyshire Falcons	8	2	6	0	0	0	8	−1.729	Eliminated

Source: Cricinfo

=== Points summary ===
Team	Group matches								Play-offs	
Team	1	2	3	4	5	6	7	8	E	F
Derbyshire Falcons	4	4	8	8	8	8	8	8	—	—
Glamorgan	5	10	14	18	18	22	27	32	→	W
Gloucestershire	0	4	4	9	9	14	18	23	W	L
Kent	0	5	5	5	9	14	18	23	L	—
Leicestershire Foxes	0	4	8	8	8	8	8	12	—	—
Middlesex	5	5	9	13	18	18	18	22	—	—
Northamptonshire Steelbacks	5	5	5	9	14	14	14	14	—	—
Sussex Sharks	0	0	0	0	5	5	9	9	—	—
Worcestershire Rapids	4	4	4	8	8	13	17	17	—	—

Win	Loss	Tie	No result	Eliminated

- Note: The total points at the end of each group match are listed.
- Note: Click on the points or results to see the match summary.

=== Round-robin ===
==== May ====
Match 1
22 May 2026
14:15
Scorecard

Middlesex; 160/6 (20 overs)	v	Kent; 54 (13.4 overs)
Saskia Horley 70 (50); Amy Gordon 2/28 (4 overs)		Elsa Barnfather 8 (7); Maddie Blinkhorn-Jones 8 (7); Katie Wolfe 5/19 (4 overs)

Middlesex won by 106 runs
Lord's, London
Umpires: Kylie White and Rehma Chandaria

- Middlesex won the toss and elected to bat.
- Points: Middlesex 5, Kent 0

Match 2
22 May 2026
14:30
Scorecard

Sussex Sharks; 114/8 (20 overs)	v	Derbyshire Falcons; 118/4 (19.1 overs)
Mollie Adams 50 (50); Maria Andrews 4/11 (4 overs)		Jessica Couser 37 (32); Eve O'Neill 3/18 (4 overs)

Derbyshire Falcons won by 6 wickets
County Ground, Derby
Umpires: Kirsty Blackham and Adam Hitchcock

- Derbyshire Falcons won the toss and elected to field.
- Points: Derbyshire Falcons 4, Sussex Sharks 0

Match 3
22 May 2026
15:00
Scorecard

Glamorgan; 184/6 (20 overs)	v	Gloucestershire; 119/6 (20 overs)
Lauren Parfitt 86 (58); Emily Geach 3/23 (4 overs)		Emily Geach 32* (23); Gemma Porter 2/24 (4 overs)

Glamorgan won by 65 runs
County Ground, Bristol
Umpires: Nick Piper and Hemal Wijesuriya

- Gloucestershire won the toss and elected to field.
- Points: Glamorgan 5, Gloucestershire 0

Match 4
22 May 2026
14:30
Scorecard

Leicestershire Foxes; 156/8 (20 overs)	v	Worcestershire Rapids; 157/8 (19.1 overs)
Flora Davies 33 (25); Caitlin Baker-Smith 3/18 (4 overs)		Ebony-Jade Tweats 77* (52); Emma Thatcher 4/18 (4 overs)

Worcestershire Rapids won by 2 wickets
Grace Road, Leicester
Umpires: Bilal Shafayat and Mansoon Qureshi

- Worcestershire Rapids won the toss and elected to field.
- Points: Worcestershire Rapids 4, Leicestershire Foxes 0

Match 5
23 May 2026
15:00
Scorecard

Glamorgan; 167/8 (20 overs)	v	Derbyshire Falcons; 75 (14.3 overs)
Daisy Jeanes 86 (54); Rhiannon Knowling-Davies 3/25 (3 overs)		Jessica Couser 16 (10); Katy Cobb 3/10 (2.3 overs)

Glamorgan won by 92 runs
Sophia Gardens, Cardiff
Umpires: Kirsty Blackham and Melissa Juniper

- Derbyshire Falcons won the toss and elected to field.
- Points: Glamorgan 5, Derbyshire Falcons 0

Match 6
24 May 2026
16:00
Scorecard

Middlesex; 115/4 (20 overs)	v	Leicestershire Foxes; 119/5 (17.2 overs)
Gayatri Gole 51* (55); Caitlin Chissell 1/5 (1 over)		Ellen Watson 28* (25); Rachana Cambampaty 2/16 (4 overs)

Leicestershire Foxes won by 5 wickets
Lord's, London
Umpires: Dean Daniels and Rose Fernando

- Middlesex won the toss and elected to bat.
- Points: Leicestershire Foxes 4, Middlesex 0

Match 7
24 May 2026
10:30
Scorecard

Northamptonshire Steelbacks; 140/6 (20 overs)	v	Worcestershire Rapids; 101 (17.5 overs)
Mabel Reid 35 (29); Clare Boycott 3/24 (4 overs)		Sophia Mitchell 29 (30); Ella Phillips 3/28 (4 overs)

Northamptonshire Steelbacks won by 39 runs
New Road, Worcester
Umpires: Kelly Alcock and Connor McGarry

- Worcestershire Rapids won the toss and elected to field.
- Points: Northamptonshire Steelbacks 5, Worcestershire Rapids 0

Match 8
25 May 2026
14:30
Scorecard

Sussex Sharks; 130/6 (20 overs)	v	Kent; 132/1 (15.5 overs)
Mollie Adams 57 (53); Amy Gordon 2/19 (4 overs)		Amy Gordon 70 (46); Bella Johnson 1/16 (3 overs)

Kent won by 9 wickets
St Lawrence Ground, Canterbury
Umpires: Melissa Juniper and Hemal Wijesuriya

- Sussex Sharks won the toss and elected to bat.
- Points: Kent 5, Sussex Sharks 0

Match 9
31 May 2026
14:30
Scorecard

Sussex Sharks; 166/5 (20 overs)	v	Glamorgan; 167/2 (19.4 overs)
Mollie Adams 80 (59); Gemma Porter 3/22 (4 overs)		Bethan Ellis 71* (55); Eve O'Neill 1/21 (4 overs)

Glamorgan won by 8 wickets
County Ground, Hove
Umpires: Lizzy Conder and Melissa Juniper

- Sussex Sharks won the toss and elected to bat.
- Points: Glamorgan 4, Sussex Sharks 0

Match 10
31 May 2026
14:30
Scorecard

Northamptonshire Steelbacks; 149/6 (20 overs)	v	Middlesex; 153/3 (20 overs)
Mabel Reid 53 (37); Isabella Routledge 2/21 (4 overs)		Saskia Horley 62* (41); Gemma Marriott 1/17 (2 overs)

Middlesex won by 7 wickets
County Ground, Northampton
Umpires: Kelly Alcock and Amy Ciyne

- Middlesex won the toss and elected to field.
- Points: Middlesex 4, Northamptonshire Steelbacks 0

Match 11
31 May 2026
14:30
Scorecard

Gloucestershire; 191/6 (20 overs)	v	Kent; 176/5 (20 overs)
AC Munday 75 (40); Hannah Hardwick 2/38 (4 overs)		Coco Streets 66 (48); Liv Daniels 2/33 (4 overs)

Gloucestershire won by 15 runs
St Lawrence Ground, Canterbury
Umpires: Rehma Chandaria and Aaron Page

- Kent won the toss and elected to field.
- Points: Gloucestershire 4, Kent 0

Match 12
31 May 2026
14:30
Scorecard

Worcestershire Rapids; 109/9 (20 overs)	v	Derbyshire Falcons; 112/3 (17 overs)
Sophia Mitchell 21 (17); Adrianna Darlow 4/15 (4 overs)		Rebecca Duckworth 60* (43); Caitlin Baker-Smith 1/10 (2 overs)

Derbyshire Falcons won by 7 wickets
New Road, Worcester
Umpires: Kylie White and Hemal Wijesuriya

- Derbyshire Falcons won the toss and elected to field.
- Points: Derbyshire Falcons 4, Worcestershire Rapids 0

==== June ====
Match 13
5 June 2026
15:00
Scorecard

Sussex Sharks; 130/7 (20 overs)	v	Leicestershire Foxes; 131/9 (20 overs)
Chiara Green 40* (34); Caitlin Chissell 3/31 (4 overs)		Flora Davies 40 (36); Poppy Tulloch 2/21 (4 overs)

Leicestershire Foxes won by 1 wicket
County Ground, Hove
Umpires: Kylie White and Mark Johnson

- Leicestershire Foxes won the toss and elected to field.
- Points: Leicestershire Foxes 4, Sussex Sharks 0

Match 14
5 June 2026
14:00
Scorecard

Glamorgan; 174/3 (20 overs)	v	Northamptonshire Steelbacks; 141/7 (20 overs)
Lauren Parfitt 50 (38); Clara Thaker 1/17 (2 overs)		Amelia Kemp 41 (36); Gemma Porter 4/21 (4 overs)

Glamorgan won by 33 runs
County Ground, Northampton
Umpires: Alan Bindley and Hemal Wijesuriya

- Glamorgan won the toss and elected to bat.
- Points: Glamorgan 4, Northamptonshire Steelbacks 0

Match 15
5 June 2026
15:00
Scorecard

Middlesex; 192/3 (20 overs)	v	Gloucestershire; 161/7 (20 overs)
Saskia Horley 111 (56); Liv Daniels 1/28 (4 overs)		Emily Geach 39 (34); Anaya Patel 4/27 (4 overs)

Middlesex won by 31 runs
County Ground, Bristol
Umpires: Dean Daniels and Jonathan Kinsey

- Gloucestershire won the toss and elected to field.
- Points: Middlesex 4, Gloucestershire 0

Match 16
5 June 2026
14:30
Scorecard

Worcestershire Rapids; 104/8 (20 overs)	v	Kent; 101 (19.4 overs)
Bryony Gillgrass 34 (39); Hannah Hardwick 4/14 (4 overs)		Amy Gordon 29 (32); Amy Maund 4/7 (4 overs)

Worcestershire Rapids won by 3 runs
St Lawrence Ground, Canterbury
Umpires: Aaron Page and Melissa Juniper

- Kent won the toss and elected to field.
- Points: Worcestershire Rapids 4, Kent 0

Match 17
7 June 2026
10:30
Scorecard

Middlesex; 154/3 (20 overs)	v	Derbyshire Falcons; 90/9 (20 overs)
Pippa Sproul 83* (57); Prisha Bedi 1/19 (4 overs)		Lauren Kenvyn 52* (61); Hannah Davis 3/10 (4 overs)

Middlesex won by 64 runs
Brunton Memorial Ground, Radlett
Umpires: Rehma Chandaria and Adam Hitchcock

- Derbyshire Falcons won the toss and elected to field.
- Points: Middlesex 5, Derbyshire Falcons 0

Match 18
7 June 2026
14:30
Scorecard

Glamorgan; 91/8 (20 overs)	v	Kent; 95/2 (17.3 overs)
Lauren Parfitt 25 (29); Hollie Young 2/11 (3 overs)		Amy Gordon 29 (46); Katy Cobb 2/28 (4 overs)

Kent won by 8 wickets
Spytty Park, Newport
Umpires: Bravin Radia and Hemal Wijesuriya

- Kent won the toss and elected to field.
- Points: Kent 4, Glamorgan 0

Match 19
7 June 2026
10:30
Scorecard

Worcestershire Rapids; 101/6 (20 overs)	v	Gloucestershire; 102/3 (14.1 overs)
Bryony Gillgrass 30 (30); Alice Hill 2/16 (4 overs)		Rebecca Halliday 70 (46); Jess Beach 1/18 (2 overs)

Gloucestershire won by 7 wickets
County Ground, Bristol
Umpires: Kelly Alcock and Kylie White

- Worcestershire Rapids won the toss and elected to bat.
- Points: Gloucestershire 5, Worcestershire Rapids 0

Match 20
7 June 2026
10:30
Scorecard

Leicestershire Foxes; 108/7 (20 overs)	v	Northamptonshire Steelbacks; 109/5 (17.5 overs)
Caitlin Chissell 28* (22); Anisha Patel 3/24 (4 overs)		Bethany Ascott 39* (42); Emma Thatcher 2/15 (3 overs)

Northamptonshire Steelbacks won by 5 wickets
Grace Road, Leicester
Umpires: Dean Daniels and Melissa Juniper

- Northamptonshire Steelbacks won the toss and elected to field.
- Points: Northamptonshire Steelbacks 4, Leicestershire Foxes 0

Match 21
14 June 2026
14:30
Scorecard

Derbyshire Falcons; 77/5 (20 overs)	v	Northamptonshire Steelbacks; 78/4 (13.2 overs)
Lauren Kenvyn 46* (57); Ella Phillips 2/8 (4 overs)		Gemma Marriott 49 (37); Rhiannon Knowling-Davies 3/15 (4 overs)

Northamptonshire Steelbacks won by 6 wickets
Denton Road, Horton
Umpires: Amy Coyne and Melissa Juniper

- Northamptonshire Steelbacks won the toss and elected to field.
- Points: Northamptonshire Steelbacks 5, Derbyshire Falcons 0

Match 22
14 June 2026
14:30
Scorecard

Gloucestershire; 89 (19.2 overs)	v	Sussex Sharks; 90/3 (13.2 overs)
Emily Geach 22 (27); Chiara Green 4/8 (4 overs)		Shristi Patil 38* (28); Isobel Patel 1/7 (1 over)

Sussex Sharks won by 7 wickets
Cricket Field Road Ground, Horsham
Umpires: Dean Daniels and Hemal Wijesuriya

- Gloucestershire won the toss and elected to bat.
- Points: Sussex Sharks 5, Gloucestershire 0

Match 23
14 June 2026
14:30
Scorecard

Middlesex; 110/7 (20 overs)	v	Worcestershire Rapids; 114/1 (14 overs)
Saskia Horley 47 (35); Jess Beach 1/11 (4 overs)		Bryony Gillgrass 51* (37); Saskia Horley 1/19 (3 overs)

Worcestershire Rapids won by 9 wickets
St Godwalds Park, Bromsgrove
Umpires: Mansoor Qureshi and Hamid Sohaib

- Middlesex won the toss and elected to bat.
- Points: Worcestershire Rapids 5, Middlesex 0

Match 24
14 June 2026
14:30
Scorecard

Kent; 161/4 (20 overs)	v	Leicestershire Foxes; 110/7 (20 overs)
Maddie Blinkhorn-Jones 71* (52); Emma Thatcher 2/31 (4 overs)		Indira Singh 25 (36); Sydney Gorham 3/18 (4 overs)

Kent won by 51 runs
Kibworth Cricket Club New Ground, Kibworth
Umpires: Kelly Alcock and Eloise Porter

- Kent won the toss and elected to bat.
- Points: Kent 5, Leicestershire Foxes 0

Match 25
27 June 2026
14:30
Scorecard

Gloucestershire; 172/8 (20 overs)	v	Derbyshire Falcons; 135/3 (20 overs)
Isobel Patel 46 (41); Prisha Bedi 4/29 (4 overs)		Frances Lonsdale 50* (40); Melissa Story 1/10 (2 overs)

Gloucestershire won by 37 runs
Queen's Park, Chesterfield
Umpires: Kelly Alcock and Hemal Wijesuriya

- Derbyshire Falcons won the toss and elected to field.
- Points: Gloucestershire 5, Derbyshire Falcons 0

Match 26
28 June 2026
10:30
Scorecard

Kent; 104 (19.4 overs)	v	Northamptonshire Steelbacks; 105/6 (20 overs)
Lenny Sims 35 (33); Sydney Gorham 2/6 (2.4 overs)		Amy Gordon 30 (40); Elizabeth Russell 3/28 (4 overs)

Kent won by 4 wickets
St Lawrence Ground, Canterbury
Umpires: Rehma Chandaria and Melissa Juniper

- Northamptonshire Steelbacks won the toss and elected to bat.
- Points: Kent 4, Northamptonshire Steelbacks 0

Match 27
28 June 2026
10:30
Scorecard

Glamorgan; 122/5 (20 overs)	v	Leicestershire Foxes; 120/7 (20 overs)
Lauren Parfitt 41 (29); Caitlin Chissell 2/15 (4 overs)		Ellen Watson 46 (49); Nicole Reid 2/18 (4 overs)

Glamorgan won by 2 runs
Grace Road, Leicester
Umpires: Bilal Shafayat and Hemal Wijesuriya

- Leicestershire Foxes won the toss and elected to field.
- Points: Glamorgan 4, Leicestershire Foxes 0

Match 28
28 June 2026
11:00
Scorecard

Sussex Sharks; 120/6 (20 overs)	v	Worcestershire Rapids; 121/4 (17.1 overs)
Shristi Patil 37 (37); Clare Boycott 3/23 (4 overs)		Madison Windeatt 46 (49); Chiara Green 2/10 (4 overs)

Worcestershire Rapids won by 6 wickets
New Road, Worcester
Umpires: Amy Coyne and Dean Daniels

- Worcestershire Rapids won the toss and elected to field.
- Points: Worcestershire Rapids 4, Sussex Sharks 0

==== July ====
Match 29
3 July 2026
14:30
Scorecard

Glamorgan; 185/4 (20 overs)	v	Middlesex; 107 (18.2 overs)
Daisy Jeanes 86 (53); Lauren Turner 2/22 (3 overs)		Pippa Sproul 27 (25); Eve Jackson 4/24 (3.2 overs)

Glamorgan won by 78 runs
Sophia Gardens, Cardiff
Umpires: Ceri Evans and Hemal Wijesuriya

- Middlesex won the toss and elected to field.
- Points: Glamorgan 5, Middlesex 0

Match 30
3 July 2026
15:00
Scorecard

Northamptonshire Steelbacks; 132/8 (20 overs)	v	Sussex Sharks; 133/4 (19.3 overs)
Lenny Sims 41 (27); Darcey Clarke 3/12 (3 overs)		Isabelle Collis 43 (39); Gemma Marriott 1/9 (1.3 overs)

Sussex Sharks won by 6 wickets
County Ground, Hove
Umpires: Melissa Juniper and Kylie White

- Northamptonshire Steelbacks won the toss and elected to bat.
- Points: Sussex Sharks 4, Northamptonshire Steelbacks 0

Match 31
3 July 2026
11:00
Scorecard

Derbyshire Falcons; 124/2 (20 overs)	v	Kent; 127/3 (14.4 overs)
Rebecca Duckworth 60* (70); Isabella James 1/31 (4 overs)		Maddie Blinkhorn-Jones 50* (40); Malisha Tennakoon 1/23 (3 overs)

Kent won by 7 wickets
County Ground, Derby
Umpires: Kelly Alcock and Bilal Shafayat

- Kent won the toss and elected to field.
- Points: Kent 5, Derbyshire Falcons 0

Match 32
3 July 2026
14:30
Scorecard

Gloucestershire; 145/8 (20 overs)	v	Leicestershire Foxes; 134/9 (20 overs)
Meg Ahearne 38 (33); Ellie Phillips 3/33 (4 overs)		Sophie Grayson 49 (33); Caitlin Belcher 3/28 (4 overs)

Gloucestershire won by 11 runs
County Ground, Bristol
Umpires: Rehma Chandaria and Dean Daniels

- Gloucestershire won the toss and elected to bat.
- Points: Gloucestershire 4, Leicestershire Foxes 0

Match 33
5 July 2026
14:30
Scorecard

Middlesex; 174/7 (20 overs)	v	Sussex Sharks; 163/7 (20 overs)
Riva Pindoria 52 (28); Eve O'Neill 4/26 (4 overs)		Mollie Adams 51 (31); Anaya Patel 4/31 (4 overs)

Middlesex won by 11 runs
Brunton Memorial Ground, Radlett
Umpires: Kirsty Blackham and Melissa Juniper

- Middlesex won the toss and elected to bat.
- Points: Middlesex 4, Sussex Sharks 0

Match 34
5 July 2026
11:00
Scorecard

Worcestershire Rapids; 103/6 (20 overs)	v	Glamorgan; 104/2 (12.3 overs)
Amy Griffiths 36 (41); Poppy Walker 2/19 (4 overs)		Lauren Parfitt 72* (40); Amy Griffiths 2/24 (3 overs)

Glamorgan won by 8 wickets
Sophia Gardens, Cardiff
Umpires: Amy Coyne and Sharon Grigg

- Glamorgan won the toss and elected to field.
- Points: Glamorgan 5, Worcestershire Rapids 0

Match 35
5 July 2026
14:30
Scorecard

Derbyshire Falcons; 130/6 (20 overs)	v	Leicestershire Foxes; 134/5 (17.4 overs)
Rebecca Duckworth 35 (44); April Herathge 1/15 (2 overs)		Ellie Phillips 33 (24); Rhiannon Knowling-Davies 2/16 (4 overs)

Leicestershire Foxes won by 5 wickets
County Ground, Derby
Umpires: Rehma Chandaria and Erica Turner

- Leicestershire Foxes won the toss and elected to field.
- Points: Leicestershire Foxes 4, Derbyshire Falcons 0

Match 36
5 July 2026
10:30
Scorecard

Gloucestershire; 144/4 (20 overs)	v	Northamptonshire Steelbacks; 101 (15.5 overs)
Meg Ahearne 48* (37); Anisha Patel 2/17 (4 overs)		Gemma Marriott 21 (13); Caitlin Belcher 4/18 (4 overs)

Gloucestershire won by 43 runs
County Ground, Northampton
Umpires: Kelly Alcock and Adam Hitchcock

- Northamptonshire Steelbacks won the toss and elected to field.
- Points: Gloucestershire 5, Northamptonshire Steelbacks 0

== Finals Day ==
=== League Two ===
Eliminator			Final
			1	Glamorgan	154/6 (20 overs)
2	Kent	93/9 (20 overs)	EW	Gloucestershire	122 (17 overs)
3	Gloucestershire	159/5 (20 overs)

Eliminator
12 July 2026
10:00
Scorecard

Gloucestershire; 159/5 (20 overs)	v	Kent; 93/9 (20 overs)
AC Munday 71 (49); Sydney Gorham 3/15 (3 overs)		Zeena Bilal 36 (42); Alice Hill 4/22 (4 overs)

Gloucestershire won by 66 runs
Sophia Gardens, Cardiff
Umpires: Rehma Chandaria and Dean Daniels

- Gloucestershire won the toss and elected to bat.

Final
12 July 2026
16:00
Scorecard

Glamorgan; 154/6 (20 overs)	v	Gloucestershire; 122 (17 overs)
Bethan Gammon 69 (47); Charlotte Phillips 3/25 (4 overs)		Izzy Patel 52 (32); Gemma Porter 2/9 (2 overs)

Glamorgan won by 32 runs
Sophia Gardens, Cardiff
Umpires: Rehma Chandaria and Kylie White

- Glamorgan won the toss and elected to bat.

=== League One ===
Semi-finals
2	Surrey	105 (15.2 overs)
3	The Blaze	106/4 (16.3 overs)
1	Hampshire Hawks	129/8 (20 overs)
4	Durham	131/6 (19.2 overs)

Final
SF1W	The Blaze	118/0 (13.2 overs)
SF2W	Durham	117/8 (20 overs)

==== Semi-finals ====
Semi-final 1
17 July 2026
11:00
Scorecard

Surrey; 105 (15.2 overs)	v	The Blaze; 106/4 (16.3 overs)
Bryony Smith 29 (28); Charli Knott 4/16 (2.2 overs)		Kathryn Bryce 34 (34); Tilly Corteen-Coleman 2/25 (4 overs)

The Blaze won by 6 wickets
The Oval, London
Umpires: Gabi Brown and Jack Shantry
Player of the match: Charli Knott (The Blaze)

- The Blaze won the toss and elected to field.

Semi-final 2
17 July 2026
14:30
Scorecard

Hampshire Hawks; 129/8 (20 overs)	v	Durham; 131/6 (19.2 overs)
Naomi Dattani 28* (22); Sophia Turner 3/21 (4 overs)		Heather Graham 35 (32); Poppy Tulloch 2/22 (3.2 overs)

Durham won by 4 wickets
The Oval, London
Umpires: Rose Fernando and Surendiran Shanmugam

- Durham won the toss and elected to field.

==== Final ====
Final
17 July 2026
18:45 (N)
Scorecard

Durham; 117/8 (20 overs)	v	The Blaze; 118/0 (13.2 overs)
Heather Graham 30 (23); Kirstie Gordon 3/21 (4 overs)		Tammy Beaumont 54* (39)

The Blaze won by 10 wickets
The Oval, London
Umpires: Gabi Brown and Jack Shantry

- The Blaze won the toss and elected to field.
