= 2026 English cricket season =

County Championship
- Champions: Warwickshire
- Runners-up: Somerset

One-Day Cup
- Champions: Middlesex
- Runners-up: Leicestershire

T20 Blast
- Champions: Northamptonshire
- Runners-up: Hampshire

Women's One-Day Cup
- Champions: The Blaze
- Runners-up: Hampshire

Women's T20 Blast
- Champions: The Blaze
- Runners-up: Durham

Women's T20 County Cup
- Champions: The Blaze
- Runners-up: Surrey

The Hundred
- Champions: Trent Rockets (women's); Manchester Super Giants (men's)
- Runners-up: Sunrisers Leeds (women's); Trent Rockets (men's)

Wisden Cricketers of the Year
- Shubman Gill, Haseeb Hameed, Ravindra Jadeja, Rishabh Pant & Mohammed Siraj

The 2026 English cricket season commenced on 3 April and finished on 27 September 2026.

It was the 126th season in which the County Championship has been an official competition and featured First-Class, List-A, and Twenty20 cricket competitions throughout England and Wales.

For both men and women, the sixth edition of The Hundred was played from 21 July – 16 August 2026.

== Women's T20 World Cup ==
The 2026 Women's T20 World Cup was held in England in June and July. Twelve international women's teams competed in the tournament in two groups of six, playing once on a round-robin basis. The top two teams from each group qualified for semi-finals with the two winners reaching the final.

After a couple of weeks of group matches, Australia, South Africa, England and the West Indies went to the knock-out stage. Australia qualified for their eight final, whereas England did so for the fifth time. Australia won the title for the seventh time after 2010, 2012, 2014, 2018, 2020 and 2023. Danni Wyatt-Hodge and Nat Sciver-Brunt were included in the team of the tournament.

== International tours ==
=== New Zealand women's tour ===
New Zealand women's team toured England in May to play three Women's Twenty20 International (WT20I) and three Women's One Day International (WODI) matches. The WODI series was drawn 1–1 with one match abandoned before England secured a 2–1 victory in the WT20I series. Linsey Smith took the player of the series award. The WODI series formed part of the 2025–2029 ICC Women's Championship.

=== India women's tour ===
From May to July, India women's team toured England to play three WT20I matches and a one-off four-day Test (WTest) match. In between the T20 matches and the WTest the two teams participated at the 2026 Women's T20 World Cup. England won the WT20I series 2–1. India won the only WTest, which was the first women's Test to be played at Lord's. Alice Capsey became the player of the WT20 series.

=== New Zealand men's tour ===
In June, New Zealand toured England to play three Test matches, which formed part of the 2025–2027 World Test Championship. New Zealand won the series 2−1 in the final series for England captain Ben Stokes and England test head coach Brendon McCullum. Jofra Archer was awarded as the player of the series.

=== India men's tour ===
In July, India toured England to play five Twenty20 International (T20I) and three One Day International (ODI) matches. England won both series, 4−0 and 2−1, respectively. Harry Brook and Joe Root won the player of the series awards.

=== Pakistan men's tour ===
In August and September, Pakistan toured England to play three Test matches which form part of the 2025–2027 World Test Championship. These were the first series for the new England captain Joe Root in his second period at this post after the 2017−2022 period, as well as for the new England coach Stephen Fleming. England won the series 3−0, while Ollie Robinson became the player of the series.

=== Ireland women's tour ===
In September, Ireland toured England to play three WODI matches which formed part of the 2025–2029 ICC Women's Championship. England won the series 3−0, while Sophia Dunkley became the player of the series.

=== Sri Lanka men's tour ===
In September, Sri Lanka toured England for three T20I and three ODI matches. England won the T20 series 3−0, with Harry Brook becoming the player of the series. The ODI series were also won by England, this time 2-1 and Will Jacks took the player of the series award.

== Domestic cricket ==
=== County Championship ===
The County Championship began on 3 April and finished on 27 September with each team playing 14 fixtures. Warwickshire won their ninth title. Leicestershire and Hampshire were relegated from Division One, with Durham and Kent earning promotion from Division Two.

=== One-Day Cup ===
The One-Day Cup ran from 21 July to 20 September with the counties separated into two groups of nine. Middlesex beat Leicestershire by 31 runs in the final.

=== T20 Blast ===
The T20 Blast ran from 22 May until 18 July with the eighteen counties divided into three groups of six - the North, Central & West, and South Groups. Northants Steelbacks beat Hampshire Hawks by 14 runs in the final.

=== The Hundred ===
The sixth season of The Hundred took place in late July and August, with eight men's and eight women's teams competing. Trent Rockets women and Manchester Super Giants men won their respective titles for the first time.

=== Women's One-Day Cup ===
The Women's One-Day Cup takes place from 11 April until 20 September. The 'League 1' counties and 'League 2' counties compete in separate round-robin groups before knockout matches in September. The Blaze beat Hampshire in the League 1 final, Hampshire won the League 2 competition.

=== Women's T20 Blast ===
The Women's T20 Blast ran from 22 May to 17 July. Both, 'Tier 1' and 'Tier 2' counties competed in a separate round-robin group with both competitions ending with a finals day. The Blaze beat Durham in the Tier 1 final, Glamorgan won the Tier 2 competition.

=== Women's T20 County Cup ===
The Women's Twenty20 Cup took place from 26 April to 29 August, with all 38 counties taking part in a knock-out competition. The Blaze beat Surrey in the final to claim their first title.

=== National Counties Cricket ===
Devon won the National Counties Championship, beating Buckinghamshire by 122 runs in the final. The National Counties Trophy was won by Berkshire who beat Cheshire in the final.
