= Trudy Johnson =

English cricketer

Personal information
- Born: 2 November 2006 (age 20); Northumberland, England
- Batting: Right-handed
- Bowling: Right-arm medium
- Role: All-rounder

Domestic team information
- Years: Team
- 2022–2024: North East Warriors
- 2025–present: Durham
- 2026–present: London Spirit

Career statistics
Competition	WLA	WT20
Matches	11	33
Runs scored	70	186
Batting average	14.00	18.60
100s/50s	0/0	1/0
Top score	32*	57*
Balls bowled	498	546
Wickets	11	23
Bowling average	40.09	25.00
5 wickets in innings	0	0
10 wickets in match	0	0
Best bowling	3/28	3/7
Catches/stumpings	2/–	9/–
- Source: CricketArchive, 29 July 2026

Trudy Johnson (born 2 November 2006) is an English cricketer who currently plays for Durham and London Spirit. She plays as a right-handed batter and right-arm medium bowler.

== Domestic career ==
Johnson made her county debut in 2022, for North East Warriors against Yorkshire, taking 1/20 from three overs and scoring eleven runs not out. She played a further seven matches for the side in the 2022 Women's Twenty20 Cup, taking five wickets and scoring 70 runs. In the 2024 Women's Twenty20 Cup she made five appearances, taking four wickets and scoring 110 runs. She made three appearances in the 2024 ECB Women's County One-Day, taking a single wicket and scoring eight runs.

Johnson was first named in the Northern Diamonds academy in 2021, before signing for Durham ahead of the 2025 season

Johnson debuted for Durham in the 2025 Women's One-Day Cup, taking a single wicket, before taking three wickets in the 2025 Women's T20 Blast. In 2026 she took nine wickets in the 2026 Women's One-Day Cup, scoring 58 runs and ten wickets in the 2026 Women's T20 Blast. She was signed by the London Spirit as a 'Wildcard player' for the 2026 The Hundred season.

== International career ==
In October 2024, Johnson was selected in the England squad for the 2025 ICC Under-19 Women's T20 World Cup.
