= Charley Phillips =

English cricketer

Personal information
- Full name: Charley Nicola Phillips
- Born: 7 May 2003 (age 23)
- Batting: Right-handed
- Bowling: Right-arm medium
- Role: Bowler

Domestic team information
- Years: Team
- 2021–2024: Hertfordshire
- 2025–present: The Blaze
- 2025–present: Trent Rockets

Career statistics
Competition	WLA	WT20
Matches	20	33
Runs scored	35	33
Batting average	11.66	16.50
100s/50s	0/0	0/0
Top score	15	11*
Balls bowled	868	582
Wickets	31	29
Bowling average	20.74	19.62
5 wickets in innings	1	0
10 wickets in match	0	0
Best bowling	5/49	4/10
Catches/stumpings	3/–	3/–
- Source: CricketArchive, 29 July 2026

Charley Nicola Phillips (born 7 May 2003) is an English cricketer who currently plays for The Blaze and Trent Rockets. She plays as a right-handed batter and right-arm medium bowler.

== Domestic career ==
Phillips made her county debut in 2021, for Hertfordshire against Norfolk, taking 3/17 from four overs. She played six matches for the side in the 2022 Women's Twenty20 Cup, taking four wickets. In the 2023 Women's Twenty20 Cup she made a further four appearances, and in the 2024 Women's Twenty20 Cup seven appearances, taking a single wicket in 2023, and four wickets in 2024. She made a single appearance in the 2024 ECB Women's County One-Day, taking three wickets.

Phillips was first named in the Sunrisers academy in 2021. She was promoted to the full squad ahead of 2024, but did not make an appearance for the side, joining The Blaze on loan in September ahead of signing permanently in 2025.

Phillips debuted for The Blaze in the 2025 Women's One-Day Cup, taking three wickets across the competition, before taking five wickets in the 2025 Women's T20 Blast. She was named as a 'Wildcard player' for the 2025 The Hundred season, being named in the Trent Rockets squad. In 2026 she took 22 wickets in the 2026 Women's One-Day Cup and two wickets in the 2026 Women's T20 Blast. She was again signed by the Trent Rockets for the 2026 The Hundred season, being signed in the auction.

== International career ==
In June 2026, she debuted for England A against India A.
