= Grace Thompson (cricketer) =

English cricketer

Personal information
- Full name: Grace Jane Thompson
- Born: 30 May 2007 (age 19); Durham, England
- Batting: Right-handed
- Bowling: Right-arm medium
- Role: Bowler

Domestic team information
- Years: Team
- 2024: North East Warriors
- 2025–present: Durham
- 2025–present: Welsh Fire

Career statistics
Competition	WLA	WT20
Matches	22	29
Runs scored	277	127
Batting average	23.08	12.70
100s/50s	0/0	0/0
Top score	49	28*
Balls bowled	813	234
Wickets	18	8
Bowling average	38.11	38.87
5 wickets in innings	0	0
10 wickets in match	0	0
Best bowling	2/17	2/11
Catches/stumpings	10/–	12/–
- Source: CricketArchive, 3 August 2026

Grace Jane Thompson (born 30 May 2007) is an English cricketer who currently plays for Durham and Welsh Fire. She plays as a right-handed batter and right-arm medium bowler.

== Domestic career ==
Thompson made her county debut in 2024, for North East Warriors against Yorkshire, taking 1/17 from four overs and scoring sixteen runs. She played one further game in 2024 against Shropshire, scoring 38 runs. She made five appearances in the 2024 Women's Twenty20 Cup, taking three wickets and scoring nine runs.

Thompson was a member of the Durham academy from the age of thirteen, before signing for Durham ahead of the 2025 season.

Thompson debuted for Durham in the 2025 Women's One-Day Cup, taking two wickets, before taking a further nine wickets across the tournament while also scoring 89 runs. She then took three wickets in the 2025 Women's T20 Blast. She was named as a 'Wildcard player' for the 2025 The Hundred season, being named in the Trent Rockets squad. In 2026 she took four wickets in the 2026 Women's One-Day Cup, while also scoring 139 runs. before taking one wicket and scoring 98 runs in the 2026 Women's T20 Blast. She was signed by the Welsh Fire for the 2026 The Hundred season, being selected in the main auction.

== International career ==
In October 2024, Thompson was selected in the England squad for the 2025 ICC Under-19 Women's T20 World Cup. In June 2025, she was selected for England A against New Zealand A.
