= Women's One-Day Cup =

English professional cricket tournament

- Countries: England; Wales
- Administrator: England and Wales Cricket Board
- Format: 50-over cricket
- First edition: 2025
- Latest edition: 2026
- Next edition: 2027
- Tournament format: League 1: Double round-robin and knockout League 2: Round-robin and knockout
- Number of teams: League 1: 9 League 2: 9
- Current champion: League 1: The Blaze (1st title); League 2: Middlesex (1st title)

The One-Day Cup Women, officially known as the Metro Bank One Day Cup Women for sponsorship reasons, is the main 50-over women's cricket competition in England and Wales. It is run by the England and Wales Cricket Board (ECB), and it serves as the successor to the Rachael Heyhoe Flint Trophy.

== Teams ==
Eight teams are competing in tier one in the inaugural 2025 season: Durham, Essex, Hampshire, Lancashire, Somerset, Surrey, Warwickshire, and The Blaze (Nottinghamshire). The other 10 major county clubs have entered the women's League Two in 2025.

Yorkshire will be awarded tier-one status and join that competition in 2026, then Glamorgan will be awarded tier-one status and join the competition in 2027, while a further two clubs will be awarded tier-one status in 2029.

Current tier-one teams in the Women's One-Day Cup

== Winners ==
=== League 1 ===
Season	Winner	Runner-up	Note
2025	Lancashire	Hampshire	
2026	The Blaze	Hampshire	

=== League 2 ===
Season	Winner	Runner-up	Note
2025	Yorkshire	Glamorgan	
2026	Middlesex	Glamorgan	

== See also ==
- Women's T20 Blast
- One-Day Cup (men's competition)
