= Emily Geach =

English cricketer

Personal information
- Full name: Emily Rose Geach
- Born: 15 February 2004 (age 22)
- Batting: Left-handed
- Bowling: Right-arm medium
- Role: Bowler

Domestic team information
- Years: Team
- 2018–2022: Cornwall
- 2022: Western Storm
- 2024–present: Gloucestershire

Career statistics
Competition	WLA	WT20
Matches	16	30
Runs scored	134	183
Batting average	22.33	10.76
100s/50s	0/0	0/0
Top score	29*	38
Balls bowled	605	581
Wickets	13	24
Bowling average	22.69	15.00
5 wickets in innings	0	0
10 wickets in match	0	0
Best bowling	2/11	3/10
Catches/stumpings	3/–	5/–
- Source: CricketArchive, 19 October 2024

Emily Rose Geach (born 15 February 2004) is an English cricketer who currently plays for Gloucestershire. She plays as a right-arm medium bowler. She has previously played for Cornwall and Western Storm.

== Domestic career ==
Geach made her county debut in 2018, for Cornwall against Dorset. She went on to take 5 wickets at an average of 18.20 in the 2018 Women's County Championship, and 7 wickets at an average of 7.14 in the 2018 Women's Twenty20 Cup. The following season, she again took 5 wickets in the County Championship and 7 wickets in the Twenty20 Cup. She took two wickets in the 2021 Women's Twenty20 Cup and three wickets in the 2022 Women's Twenty20 Cup.

Geach was named in the Western Storm Academy squad in 2021 and 2022. She was promoted to the first team squad in September 2022, making her debut for the side on 18 September, against North West Thunder in the Rachael Heyhoe Flint Trophy. She returned to the Western Storm squad in 2024, having spent much of the previous season out with injury.
