= Gabi Brown =

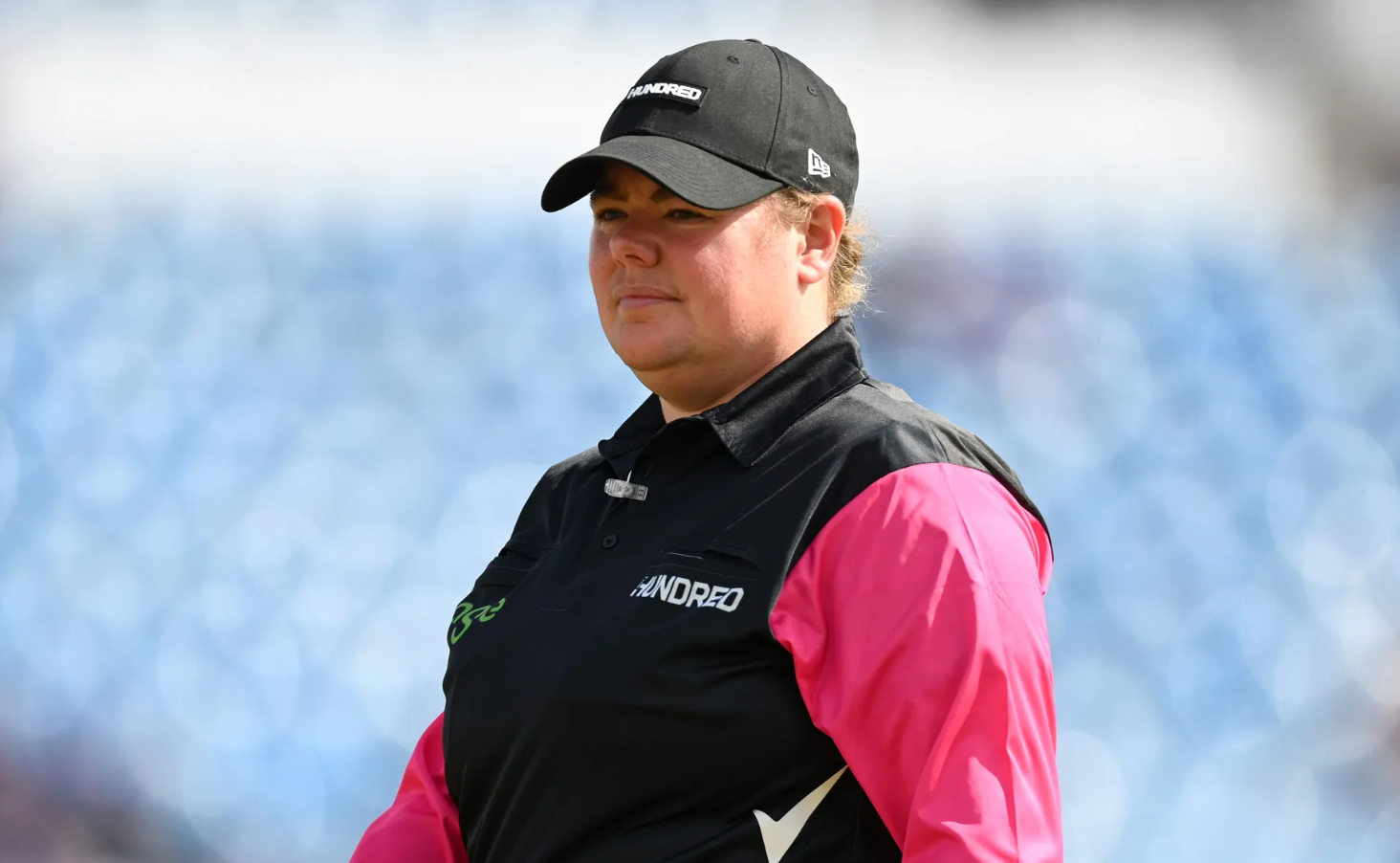

Personal information
- Full name: Gabrielle Sarah Brown
- Born: September 1, 1989 (age 37); Lancashire, England
- Role: Umpire

Gabrielle Sarah Brown (born 1 September 1989) is an English cricket umpire who has progressed rapidly through the domestic officiating ranks to become one of the leading female umpires in England. She became the second full-time female member of the England and Wales Cricket Board (ECB) Professional Umpire Team in 2026.

Brown was born in Lancashire, and currently resides in Nottinghamshire.

== Career ==
Brown started umpiring in 2022 in Women's Domestic Academy fixtures before rising through both the Women's and Men's Cricket Pathways, making her debut in Women's Professional Domestic fixtures by the end of the 2023 season. Her first professional fixture being Sunrisers v. Western Storm at Radlett CC.

During the 2023 season Brown began umpiring in both the South Nottinghamshire Cricket League and the Nottinghamshire Premier League.

In 2024, Brown achieved W1 umpire status, marking her as one of the top-ranked officials in the Women's game. She regularly stood in the Rachael Heyhoe-Flint Trophy and the Charlotte Edwards Cup and served as a fourth umpire in the Women's The Hundred Competition. During the same year, she officiated in England Women's warm-up matches and the Disability Premier League final.

Brown's career continued to accelerate in 2025, when she was appointed to officiate in every Women's domestic final across ECB Professional Competitions. In recognition of her performances, she was awarded the Professional Cricketers' Association (PCA) Women's Umpire of the Year award. She made her on-field The Hundred debut at the Utilita Bowl in the Southern Brave v. Northern Superchargers fixture.

In 2026, Brown was appointed as a full-time member of the ECB professional umpire panel, becoming only the second woman to achieve this milestone. Brown was appointed to the Emirates ICC International Panel of Umpires in March 2026, joining other English Female Umpires Sue Redfern and Anna Harris.

Brown is also an Umpire Tutor, Developer and Mentor, working with lower ranked umpires with a particular focus on developing more female officials.
