= Meg Austin =

English cricketer

Personal information
- Full name: Meg Austin
- Born: 7 September 2004 (age 22)
- Batting: Right-handed
- Bowling: Right-arm leg break
- Role: Batter

Domestic team information
- Years: Team
- 2019–present: Staffordshire
- 2023–2024: Central Sparks

Career statistics
Competition	WLA	WT20
Matches	6	6
Runs scored	81	122
Batting average	20.25	40.66
100s/50s	0/0	0/1
Top score	44*	50
Balls bowled	–	12
Wickets	–	0
Bowling average	–	–
5 wickets in innings	–	0
10 wickets in match	–	0
Best bowling	–	–
Catches/stumpings	1/–	2/–
- Source: CricketArchive, 16 October 2024

Meg Austin (born 7 September 2004) is an English cricketer who currently plays for Staffordshire. She plays as a right-handed batter. She previously played for Central Sparks.

== Domestic career ==
Austin made her county debut in 2019, for Staffordshire against Derbyshire, in which she scored 44*. She scored her maiden county half-century in the 2023 Women's Twenty20 Cup, scoring 50 against Leicestershire.

Austin was named in the Central Sparks Academy squad between 2021 and 2024. In July 2023, she was included in a matchday squad for the senior side for the first time. She made her debut for the side on 4 September 2024, against South East Stars in the Rachael Heyhoe Flint Trophy. She played one further match for the side that season.
