= Jemima Spence =

English cricketer

Personal information
- Full name: Jemima Emma Maxwell Spence
- Born: 6 July 2006 (age 20); Balham, Greater London, England
- Batting: Right-handed
- Role: Wicket-keeper

Domestic team information
- Years: Team
- 2021–2024: Kent
- 2022–2024: South East Stars
- 2025–present: Surrey

Career statistics
Competition	WLA	WT20
Matches	12	5
Runs scored	168	93
Batting average	18.66	18.60
100s/50s	0/0	0/0
Top score	45*	24
Catches/stumpings	1/–	4/0
- Source: CricketArchive, 18 October 2024

Jemima Emma Maxwell Spence (born 6 July 2006) is an English cricketer who currently plays for Surrey. She plays as a right-handed batter and wicket-keeper.

== Domestic career ==
Spence first played for the Kent senior team in 2021, in the Women's London Championship, scoring 66 in her first match against Sussex. She was named as Kent's Emerging Player of the Year at the end of the 2021 season. She went on to play for Kent in the 2022 Women's Twenty20 Cup, scoring 71 runs at an average of 17.75 in four matches.

Spence was named in the South East Stars Academy squad in 2021. She was again named in the academy squad in 2022, and made 111* for the side against Sunrisers Academy in August 2022. She was promoted to the senior squad in September 2022, and made her debut for South East Stars on 11 September, scoring 26 against Central Sparks in the Rachael Heyhoe Flint Trophy. Spence top-scored for South East Stars in the Rachael Heyhoe Flint Trophy play-off against Southern Vipers, scoring 45*. In 2023, she played nine matches for South East Stars, all in the Rachael Heyhoe Flint Trophy, scoring 80 runs.

== International career ==
In October 2022, Spence was selected as a non-travelling reserve in the England Under-19 squad for the 2023 ICC Under-19 Women's T20 World Cup.
