= Lauren Parfitt =

Welsh cricketer

Personal information
- Full name: Lauren Amy Parfitt
- Born: 1 April 1994 (age 32); Pontypool, Wales
- Batting: Right-handed
- Bowling: Slow left-arm orthodox
- Role: Batter

Domestic team information
- Years: Team
- 2007–2024: Wales
- 2017–2018, 2020-2022: Western Storm
- 2025–present: Glamorgan

Career statistics
Competition	WLA	WT20
Matches	83	69
Runs scored	1,652	1,233
Batting average	22.32	24.66
100s/50s	1/8	0/6
Top score	109*	74*
Balls bowled	1,052	544
Wickets	26	30
Bowling average	27.19	18.46
5 wickets in innings	1	0
10 wickets in match	0	0
Best bowling	5/20	3/11
Catches/stumpings	37/–	17/–
- Source: CricketArchive, 23 October 2023

Lauren Amy Parfitt (born 1 April 1994) is a Welsh cricketer who is currently captain of Glamorgan. She plays as a right-handed batter and occasional slow left-arm orthodox bowler. She has previously played for Western Storm and played as captain for Wales.

== Early life ==
Parfitt was born on 1 April 1994 in Pontypool, Wales. Her sister, Georgia, plays for Wales alongside her.

== Domestic career ==
Parfitt made her debut for Wales in 2007 against Worcestershire in the County Challenge Cup. In 2011, she was her side's leading run-scorer in the County Championship, with 132 runs. In 2013, she hit her maiden half-century for the side, scoring 52 against Devon. In 2014 she took her maiden five-wicket haul, taking 5/20 from 10 overs before hitting 31* in Wales' 9-wicket victory over Worcestershire.

In 2015 she was the ninth-highest run-scorer across the County Championship, with 268 runs including her maiden List A century, 109* made against Essex. She was also her side's leading run-scorer in the 2015 Women's Twenty20 Cup, with 161 runs. In 2016, Parfitt was her side's leading run-scorer across both competitions. Parfitt became captain of Wales in 2017, and led the side to promotion to Division 1 of the Twenty20 Cup in 2018. In 2019, she scored 177 runs in the County Championship, including two half-centuries. In 2021, Parfitt was Wales' leading run-scorer in the 2021 Women's Twenty20 Cup, with 149 runs including 70*, made against Somerset. She played seven matches for the side in the 2022 Women's Twenty20 Cup, scoring 80 runs and taking 7 wickets. She played five matches in the 2023 Women's Twenty20 Cup, scoring 115 runs including one half-century.

Parfitt was also in Western Storm's squad in the Women's Cricket Super League in 2017 and 2018, but did not play a match for the side.

In 2020, Parfitt returned to Western Storm for the Rachael Heyhoe Flint Trophy. She appeared in 5 matches, scoring 89 runs at an average of 22.25, with a high score of 33*. In 2021 she was retained in the squad, and scored 91 in a Rachael Heyhoe Flint Trophy match against Central Sparks as well as taking 3 wickets at an average of 27.66 in the Charlotte Edwards Cup. She played one match for Western Storm in 2022, against Lightning in the Rachael Heyhoe Flint Trophy, scoring 9 runs and taking two wickets.

In 2025, Parfitt joined the new Glamorgan women's cricket team and was named captain in April 2025.
