= Jess Hazell =

English cricketer

Personal information
- Full name: Jessica Hazell
- Born: 22 August 2004 (age 22)
- Batting: Right-handed
- Role: Wicket-keeper

Domestic team information
- Years: Team
- 2019–present: Somerset
- 2024: Western Storm

Career statistics
Competition	WLA	WT20
Matches	19	34
Runs scored	412	281
Batting average	31.69	21.61
100s/50s	0/3	0/0
Top score	70*	38*
Catches/stumpings	6/4	6/2
- Source: CricketArchive, 24 June 2026

Jessica Hazell (born 22 August 2004) is an English cricketer who currently plays for Somerset. She plays as a wicket-keeper and right-handed batter.

== Early life ==
Hazell attended Millfield School in Somerset and read Human Biosciences (BSc.) at Exeter University where she gained a First Class Honours Degree.

== Domestic career ==
Hazell made her county debut in 2019, for Somerset against Middlesex at the age of 14. She played one further match for the side that season, and was ever-present for Somerset in the 2021 Women's Twenty20 Cup.

She was first selected for the Western Storm Academy in 2021, and was subsequently selected in 2022, 2023 and 2024. In August 2022, she scored 77 in the academy's victory over Southern Vipers Academy. She made her debut for the senior Western Storm side on 1 May 2024, against South East Stars in the Rachael Heyhoe Flint Trophy.

In 2025 she was a regular for Somerset Women, during their first year of the new Tiered ECB league format for professional women cricketers. In 2026 and having gained her First Class Honours Degree in Human Biosciences, she was awarded a further extension of her contract to the end of the 2028 season.
