= Amy Gordon (cricketer) =

English cricketer (born 2001)

Personal information
- Full name: Amy Grace Gordon
- Born: 3 October 2001 (age 25); Redhill, Surrey, England
- Batting: Right-handed
- Bowling: Right-arm off-spin
- Role: Bowler

Domestic team information
- Years: Team
- 2016–2024: Surrey
- 2018–2019: Surrey Stars
- 2020: South East Stars
- 2021: Welsh Fire
- 2025-present: Kent

Career statistics
Competition	WLA	WT20
Matches	20	49
Runs scored	166	522
Batting average	15.09	18.00
100s/50s	0/0	0/2
Top score	31*	54
Balls bowled	313	588
Wickets	5	25
Bowling average	58.20	23.88
5 wickets in innings	0	0
10 wickets in match	0	0
Best bowling	2/44	3/15
Catches/stumpings	10/–	16/–
- Source: CricketArchive, 23 October 2023

Amy Grace Gordon (born 3 October 2001) is an English cricketer who is currently on the books of Kent. She plays primarily as a right-arm off-spin bowler, as well as a right-handed lower-order batter. She has previously played for Surrey, Surrey Stars, South East Stars and Welsh Fire.

== Early life ==
Gordon was born on 3 October 2001 in Redhill, Surrey.

== Domestic career ==
Gordon made her county debut in 2016, for Surrey against Worcestershire in the Twenty20 Cup. Overall, she took five wickets at an average of 9.00 in the Twenty20 Cup that season, including her Twenty20 best bowling figures of 3/15 against Staffordshire. Gordon was part of the Surrey side that won promotion to Division 1 of the County Championship in 2018, contributing 84 runs including her List A high score of 31*. In 2021, she scored 126 runs and took 3 wickets for Surrey in the Twenty20 Cup. In the 2022 Women's Twenty20 Cup, Gordon was Surrey's leading run-scorer, with 102 runs, and their joint-leading wicket-taker, with 6 wickets. She scored her maiden Twenty20 half-century during the tournament, scoring 54 against Hampshire. She played three matches in the 2023 Women's Twenty20 Cup, scoring one half-century. In April 2024, she was named as captain of Surrey.

Gordon was called up to play for Surrey Stars in the Women's Cricket Super League in 2018 midway through the tournament, as an injury-replacement for Grace Gibbs. Whilst she did not play for the side that season, she was a full member of the squad in 2019, playing 7 matches and taking 2 wickets at an average of 32.00.

In 2020, Gordon played for South East Stars in the Rachael Heyhoe Flint Trophy. She appeared in three matches and took 1 wicket, against Southern Vipers. In 2021, she was in Welsh Fire's squad in The Hundred, but did not play a match.

Gordon was named Surrey captain in April 2024. In November 2024, she left the club to join Kent ahead of the 2025 season which will see a newly restructured women's domestic cricket set-up in England and Wales.
