= Esmae MacGregor =

English cricketer (born 2004)

Personal information
- Full name: Esmae Isabel MacGregor
- Born: 31 July 2004 (age 22); Colchester, Essex, England
- Batting: Right-handed
- Bowling: Right-arm medium
- Role: Bowler

Domestic team information
- Years: Team
- 2021–present: Essex
- 2023–2024: Sunrisers

Career statistics
Competition	WLA	WT20
Matches	8	12
Runs scored	22	4
Batting average	22.00	2.00
100s/50s	0/0	0/0
Top score	20*	3
Balls bowled	210	223
Wickets	4	13
Bowling average	46.75	16.23
5 wickets in innings	0	0
10 wickets in match	0	0
Best bowling	1/16	2/5
Catches/stumpings	4/–	2/–
- Source: CricketArchive, 19 October 2024

Esmae Isabel MacGregor (born 31 July 2004) is an English cricketer who currently plays for Essex. She plays as a right-arm medium bowler.

== Domestic career ==
MacGregor made her county debut in 2021, for Essex against Sussex. Overall, she took five wickets at an average of 25.80 in the 2021 Women's Twenty20 Cup. She played one match in the 2022 Women's Twenty20 Cup, taking one wicket against Suffolk. She played three matches in the 2023 Women's Twenty20 Cup, taking four wickets at an average of 6.50.

MacGregor was named in the Sunrisers Academy squad between 2021 and 2023. She was promoted to the senior squad in June 2023. She made her debut for the side on 7 June 2023, against Southern Vipers in the Charlotte Edwards Cup. She played three matches overall that season, taking three wickets. In 2024, she played six matches for Sunrisers, all in the Rachael Heyhoe Flint Trophy, taking three wickets.

MacGregor signed for the newly professional Essex Women in November 2024. She took four wickets for eight runs off 3.2 overs in the club's second 2025 Women's T20 Blast match against Somerset at the County Cricket Ground, Chelmsford, on 1 June 2025.
