= Glamorgan Women cricket team =

County cricket team in Wales

Glamorgan Women
- League: Women's One-Day Cup, T20 Blast
- Conference: League 2

Personnel
- Captain: Lauren Parfitt
- Coach: Rachel Priest

Team information
- Founded: 2024
- Home ground: Sophia Gardens
- Secondary home ground(s): Newport CC, Neath CC, Colwyn Bay CC

History
- T20 Blast League 2 wins: 1

The Glamorgan Women's cricket team is the women's representative cricket team for the Welsh historic county of Glamorgan. The team competes in county cricket competitions in England and Wales. Its founding was confirmed by Glamorgan CCC and the ECB in April 2024.

Having begun playing in 2025, it is competing in the Women's One-Day Cup and Women's T20 Blast in League 2, and in the Women's T20 County Cup. The team is scheduled to move to the top division as a professional team in 2027.

Glamorgan's head coach is the former New Zealand international player Rachel Priest. The team captain is Lauren Parfitt.

The team is partnered with Glamorgan men's team. They will play a set of double-header T20 matches in 2025, including at Sophia Gardens. Glamorgan Women's first competitive match was on 19 April 2025, a 53-run win over Sussex in the Women's One-Day Cup.

A Glamorgan Ladies team played friendly matches in 1890 and 1891, founded by Violet Morgan and Constance Hill (daughters of Frederick Courtenay Morgan and Sir Edward Stock Hill respectively). Later, clubs were created including South Wales Women’s CC in 1936, and the Glamorgan–Gloucestershire team in 1951 as part of the Women's Cricket Association.

Between 2002 and 2024, Wales women's cricket team played in the Women's County Championship, Twenty20 Cup and other competitions. Nine members of that team joined Glamorgan when it formed. From 2016 until 2024, the combined regional women's team Western Storm had represented both Wales and the counties of South West England. Glamorgan's head of women's and girls' cricket, Aimee Rees, said in 2024, "Glamorgan doesn’t just represent a county, we represent a country, and today’s [Tier 1] announcement will give girls in Wales the best opportunity to be professional cricketers".

Glamorgan and Cardiff Metropolitan University run an associated academy to train young cricketers, including selected female players from Wales, Gloucestershire and Wiltshire.

== Players ==
=== Current squad ===
- No. denotes the player's squad number, as worn on the back of their shirt.
- ‡ denotes players with international caps.

| No. | Name | Nationality | Birth date | Batting style | Bowling style | Notes |
Batters
| 7 | Lauren Parfitt | Wales | 1 April 1994 (age 32) | Right-handed | Left-arm medium | Club Captain |
| 15 | Megan McColl ‡ | Scotland | 15 November 2000 (age 25) | Right-handed | Right-arm medium | |
| 23 | Daisy Jeanes | England | 30 July 2001 (age 25) | Right-handed | Right-arm medium | |
| 35 | Bethan Gammon | Wales | 10 March 2001 (age 25) | Right-handed | — | |
| — | Nancy Harman | England | 11 July 1999 (age 27) | Right-handed | Right-arm leg break | |
All-rounders
| — | Bethan Ellis | England | 7 July 1999 (age 27) | Right-handed | Right-arm medium | |
| — | Megan Sturge | England | 3 November 2004 (age 21) | Right-handed | Right-arm off break | |
Wicket-keepers
| — | Abbey Freeborn | England | 12 November 1996 (age 29) | Right-handed | — | |
| — | Seren Smale ‡ | England | 13 December 2004 (age 21) | Right-handed | — | |
Bowlers
| 11 | Eve Jackson | Wales | 20 May 2007 (age 19) | Right-handed | Right-arm medium | |
| 49 | Poppy Walker | England | 25 April 2008 (age 18) | Right-handed | Right-arm leg break | |
| 85 | Gemma Porter | England | 11 February 2003 (age 23) | Right-handed | Right-arm off break | |
| — | Georgia Davis ‡ | England | 3 June 1999 (age 27) | Right-handed | Right-arm off break | |
| — | Hannah Jones | England | 10 February 1999 (age 27) | Left-handed | Slow left-arm orthodox | |
| — | Charlotte Lambert | England | 22 June 2006 (age 20) | Right-handed | Right-arm medium | |
| — | Bethan Robinson | England | 3 February 2005 (age 21) | Right-handed | Right-arm medium | |
| — | Amy Wheeler | England | 31 July 2005 (age 21) | Right-handed | Right-arm medium | |
Source: Updated: 3 October 2026
