= 2024 One-Day Cup =

Cricket tournament

- Dates: 24 July – 23 September 2024
- Administrator: England and Wales Cricket Board
- Cricket format: List A
- Tournament format(s): Group stage and knockout
- Champions: Glamorgan (2nd title)
- Participants: 18
- Matches: 77
- Most runs: Peter Handscomb (539)
- Most wickets: Ed Barnard (19); Andy Gorvin (19); Dan Douthwaite (19)
- Official website: ecb.co.uk

The 2024 One-Day Cup (also known as for sponsorship reasons as 2024 Metro Bank One Day Cup) was a limited overs cricket competition in England and Wales. Matches were contested over 50 overs per side, having List A cricket status, with all eighteen first-class counties competed in the tournament. The tournament started on 24 July 2024, with the final scheduled to take place on 22 September 2024. However, heavy rain forced it to be moved to the reserve day, 23 September 2024. In November 2023, England and Wales Cricket Board confirmed the fixtures for the tournament, as a part of the 2024 English domestic cricket season. Leicestershire were the defending champions, having won the 2023 tournament.

Glamorgan won the tournament after beating Somerset in the rain affected final.

== Teams ==
The teams were placed into the following groups:

- Group A: Derbyshire, Durham, Hampshire, Kent, Lancashire, Middlesex, Northamptonshire, Somerset, Worcestershire
- Group B: Essex, Glamorgan, Gloucestershire, Leicestershire, Nottinghamshire, Surrey, Sussex, Warwickshire, Yorkshire

== Standings ==
=== Group A ===
| Pos | Team | Pld | W | L | T | NR | Pts | NRR |
|---|---|---|---|---|---|---|---|---|
| 1 | Somerset | 8 | 6 | 2 | 0 | 0 | 12 | 1.217 |
| 2 | Worcestershire | 8 | 5 | 3 | 0 | 0 | 10 | 0.564 |
| 3 | Hampshire | 8 | 5 | 3 | 0 | 0 | 10 | 0.191 |
| 4 | Derbyshire | 8 | 5 | 3 | 0 | 0 | 10 | 0.048 |
| 5 | Durham | 8 | 4 | 3 | 0 | 1 | 9 | −0.048 |
| 6 | Middlesex | 8 | 3 | 4 | 0 | 1 | 7 | −0.764 |
| 7 | Kent | 8 | 3 | 5 | 0 | 0 | 6 | −0.619 |
| 8 | Northamptonshire | 8 | 2 | 6 | 0 | 0 | 4 | 0.231 |
| 9 | Lancashire | 8 | 2 | 6 | 0 | 0 | 4 | −0.841 |

Source: ESPNcricinfo

Advance to semi-finals
Advance to quarter-finals

=== Group B ===
| Pos | Team | Pld | W | L | T | NR | Pts | NRR |
|---|---|---|---|---|---|---|---|---|
| 1 | Glamorgan | 8 | 6 | 1 | 0 | 1 | 13 | 1.024 |
| 2 | Leicestershire | 8 | 6 | 2 | 0 | 0 | 12 | −0.416 |
| 3 | Warwickshire | 8 | 5 | 2 | 0 | 1 | 11 | 0.629 |
| 4 | Nottinghamshire | 8 | 4 | 4 | 0 | 0 | 8 | 0.454 |
| 5 | Gloucestershire | 8 | 4 | 4 | 0 | 0 | 8 | 0.244 |
| 6 | Yorkshire | 8 | 4 | 4 | 0 | 0 | 8 | −0.232 |
| 7 | Essex | 8 | 3 | 5 | 0 | 0 | 6 | −0.098 |
| 8 | Surrey | 8 | 2 | 6 | 0 | 0 | 4 | −0.760 |
| 9 | Sussex | 8 | 1 | 7 | 0 | 0 | 2 | −0.690 |

Source: ESPNcricinfo

Advance to semi-finals
Advance to quarter-finals

== Group A fixtures ==
Source: England and Wales Cricket Board

24 July 2024
11:00
Scorecard

| Northamptonshire; 235 (47 overs) | v | Derbyshire; 236/8 (48.4 overs) |
| Emilio Gay 59 (81); Zak Chappell 4/39 (10 overs) | | Zak Chappell 94* (87); Raphael Weatherall 4/50 (8 overs) |

Derbyshire won by 2 wickets
County Ground, Northampton
Umpires: Hassan Adnan and Neil Mallender

- Derbyshire won the toss and elected to field.
- Raphael Weatherall (Northamptonshire) made his List A debut.

24 July 2024
11:00
Scorecard

| Durham; 344/4 (50 overs) | v | Lancashire; 287 (45.1 overs) |
| Alex Lees 111 (126); George Balderson 1/57 (10 overs) | | Josh Bohannon 147 (119); Bas de Leede 3/33 (8 overs) |

Durham won by 57 runs
Sedbergh School, Sedbergh
Umpires: Tom Lungley and Steve O'Shaughnessy

- Durham won the toss and elected to bat.
- Charlie Barnard, Harry Singh (Lancashire) and Haydon Mustard (Durham) all made their List A debuts.

24 July 2024
11:00
Scorecard

| Worcestershire; 371/3 (48 overs) | v | Middlesex; 188 (25.4 overs) |
| Ed Pollock 180 (138); Nathan Fernandes 2/79 (10 overs) | | Mark Stoneman 75 (37); Tommy Sturgess 3/37 (5.4 overs) |

Worcestershire won by 183 runs
New Road, Worcester
Umpires: Richard Illingworth and Jack Shantry

- Middlesex won the toss and elected to field.
- The match was reduced to 48 overs per side due to rain.
- Harry Darley, Rehaan Edavalath, Jack Home, Tom Hinley, Hishaam Khan, Tommy Sturgess (Worcestershire) Noah Cornwell and Nathan Fernandes (Middlesex) all made their List A debuts.

26 July 2024
11:00
Scorecard

| Hampshire; 285/8 (50 overs) | v | Northamptonshire; 214 (43.5 overs) |
| Ben Brown 139 (131); Jack White 3/6 (6 overs) | | Gus Miller 47 (49); Eddie Jack 4/29 (8.5 overs) |

Hampshire won by 71 runs
Rose Bowl, Southampton
Umpires: Ben Debenham and Anna Harris

- Northamptonshire won the toss and elected to field.

26 July 2024
14:00 (D/N)
Scorecard

| Kent; 267 (49 overs) | v | Somerset; 270/7 (46.3 overs) |
| Joey Evison 55 (69); Lewis Goldsworthy 4/44 (10 overs) | | Andrew Umeed 114* (121); Beyers Swanepoel 2/32 (7 overs) |

Somerset won by 3 wickets
County Ground, Taunton
Umpires: Paul Baldwin and Ben Peverall

- Kent won the toss and elected to bat.
- Ekansh Singh (Kent) and Archie Vaughan (Somerset) both made their List A debut.

27 July 2024
11:00
Scorecard

| Middlesex; 266 (49.4 overs) | v | Derbyshire; 267/1 (43 overs) |
| Joe Cracknell 56 (74); Daryn Dupavillon 3/47 (7.4 overs) | | Harry Came 113* (137); Luke Hollman 1/49 (10 overs) |

Derbyshire won by 9 wickets
County Ground, Derby
Umpires: Neil Pratt and Chris Watts

- Derbyshire won the toss and elected to field.
- Muhammed Naeem (Derbyshire) made his List A debut.
- Harry Came (Derbyshire) scored his maiden century in List A cricket.

28 July 2024
11:00
Scorecard

| Somerset; 242 (49.4 overs) | v | Hampshire; 243/5 (46.1 overs) |
| Andrew Umeed 84 (103); Brad Wheal 2/33 (7.4 overs) | | Toby Albert 96* (87); Kasey Aldridge 1/32 (8.1 overs) |

Hampshire won by 5 wickets
Rose Bowl, Southampton
Umpires: Neil Bainton and Sam Hollingshead

- Somerset won the toss and elected to bat.
- Joe Heywood (Somerset) made his List A debut.

28 July 2024
11:00
Scorecard

| Kent; 209 (48.4 overs) | v | Lancashire; 204 (49.2 overs) |
| Harry Finch 48 (63); Chris Green 3/38 | | Keaton Jennings 107* (140); Matt Parkinson 4/30 |

Kent won by 5 runs
Stanley Park, Blackpool
Umpires: Graham Lloyd and David Millns

- Lancashire won the toss and elected to field.
- Rocky Flintoff and Ollie Sutton (Lancashire) both made their List A debuts.

28 July 2024
11:00
Scorecard

| Worcestershire; 260 (48.4 overs) | v | Durham; 167 (33.3 overs) |
| Jake Libby 89 (117); Paul Coughlin 3/32 (10 overs) | | Ben McKinney 80 (86); Tom Hinley 5/56 (7.3 overs) |

Worcestershire won by 93 runs
New Road, Worcester
Umpires: Graeme Cross and Tom Lungley

- Worcestershire won the toss and elected to bat.
- James Minto (Durham) made his List A debut.
- Tom Hinley (Worcestershire) took his first five-wicket haul in List A cricket.

29 July 2024
11:00
Scorecard

| Northamptonshire; 317/9 (50 overs) | v | Middlesex; 319/5 (48.1 overs) |
| Prithvi Shaw 76 (58); Luke Hollman 3/39 (10 overs) | | Mark Stoneman 76 (58); Justin Broad 3/65 (9 overs) |

Middlesex won by 5 wickets
Radlett Cricket Club, Radlett
Umpires: Anna Harris and Surendiran Shanmugam

- Northamptonshire won the toss and elected to bat.

31 July 2024
11:00
Scorecard

| Lancashire; 99 (20 overs) | v | Derbyshire; 100/1 (19.5 overs) |
| George Bell 18 (23); Pat Brown 5/37 (6 overs) | | Luis Reece 52* (63); Jack Blatherwick 1/36 (5 overs) |

Derbyshire won by 9 wickets
County Ground, Derby
Umpires: Naeem Ashraf and Peter Hartley

- Derbyshire won the toss and elected to field.
- Pat Brown (Derbyshire) took his first five-wicket haul in List A cricket.

31 July 2024
11:00
Scorecard

| Somerset; 241/9 (50 overs) | v | Durham; 108 (30.3 overs) |
| Lewis Goldsworthy 93 (134); Paul Coughlin 3/47 (10 overs) | | Scott Borthwick 35 (51); Jack Leach 6/26 (10 overs) |

Somerset won by 133 runs
Riverside Ground, Chester-le-Street
Umpires: Michael Gough and Jack Shantry

- Somerset won the toss and elected to bat.
- Daniel Hogg (Durham) made his List A debut.
- Jack Leach (Somerset) took his first five-wicket haul in List A cricket.

31 July 2024
11:00
Scorecard

| Hampshire; 168 (41 overs) | v | Kent; 170/6 (40.3 overs) |
| Kyle Abbott 37 (34); Beyers Swanepoel 3/28 (9 overs) | | Harry Finch 53* (94); Kyle Abbott 3/16 (10 overs) |

Kent won by 4 wickets
County Cricket Ground, Beckenham
Umpires: Surendiran Shanmugam and Chris Watts

- Hampshire won the toss and elected to bat.

2 August 2024
11:00
Scorecard

| Derbyshire; 260 (49.4 overs) | v | Worcestershire; 261/2 (44.4 overs) |
| Harry Came 71 (104); Jack Home 6/51 (7.4 overs) | | Gareth Roderick 152* (139); Zak Chappell 2/40 (9 overs) |

Worcestershire won by 8 wickets
County Ground, Derby
Umpires: David Millns and Casper Viljoen

- Worcestershire won the toss and elected to field.
- Jack Home (Worcestershire) took his first five-wicket haul in List A cricket.

2 August 2024
11:00
Scorecard

| Northamptonshire; 260 (49.2 overs) | v | Durham; 261/6 (48.1 overs) |
| Prithvi Shaw 97 (71); Colin Ackermann 2/38 (10 overs) | | Colin Ackermann 108 (106); Saif Zaib 2/52 (10 overs) |

Durham won by 4 wickets
Riverside Ground, Chester-le-Street
Umpires: Steve O'Shaughnessy and Bilal Shafayat

- Northamptonshire won the toss and elected to bat.

2 August 2024
14:00 (D/N)
Scorecard

| Lancashire; 218 (49.1 overs) | v | Somerset; 220/2 (40.5 overs) |
| Chris Green 65 (54); Kasey Aldridge 6/33 (7.1 overs) | | George Thomas 106* (142); Charlie Barnard 1/49 (10 overs) |

Somerset won by 8 wickets
County Ground, Taunton
Umpires: Surendiran Shanmugam and Simon Widdup

- Somerset won the toss and elected to field.
- Mitchell Stanley (Lancashire) made his List A debut.
- George Thomas (Somerset) scored his maiden century in List A cricket.

4 August 2024
11:00
Scorecard

| Hampshire; 222/8 (50 overs) | v | Lancashire; 151 (39.5 overs) |
| Felix Organ 74* (57); Tom Bailey 2/45 (10 overs) | | Chris Green 100 (95); John Turner 4/24 (8.5 overs) |

Hampshire won by 71 runs
Rose Bowl, Southampton
Umpires: Naeem Ashraf and Graeme Cross

- Lancashire won the toss and elected to field.

4 August 2024
11:00
Scorecard

| Kent; 204 (44.4 overs) | v | Middlesex; 206/5 (31.2 overs) |
| Marcus O'Riordan 58 (46); Nathan Fernandes 2/31 (8 overs) | | Joe Cracknell 88 (82); Grant Stewart 2/35 (6 overs) |

Middlesex won by 5 wickets
County Cricket Ground, Beckenham
Umpires: Ben Peverall and James Tredwell

- Kent won the toss and elected to bat.

4 August 2024
11:00
Scorecard

| Northamptonshire; 295/6 (50 overs) | v | Worcestershire; 165 (39 overs) |
| Prithvi Shaw 72 (59); Fateh Singh 3/51 (10 overs) | | Tom Taylor 57 (44); Justin Broad 3/32 (7 overs) |

Northamptonshire won by 130 runs
County Ground, Northampton
Umpires: Neil Pratt and Surendiran Shanmugam

- Worcestershire won the toss and elected to field.

4 August 2024
11:00
Scorecard

| Somerset; 316/5 (50 overs) | v | Derbyshire; 317/9 (48.2 overs) |
| James Rew 88 (105); Zak Chappell 3/54 (10 overs) | | Anuj Dal 115 (75); George Thomas 3/41 (10 overs) |

Derbyshire won by 1 wicket
County Ground, Taunton
Umpires: Ian Blackwell and Mohammed Waseem

- Derbyshire won the toss and elected to field.

6 August 2024
11:00
Scorecard

| Middlesex | v | Durham |

Match abandoned
Radlett Cricket Club, Radlett
Umpires: Naeem Ashraf and Anthony Harris

- No toss.
- No play was possible due to rain.

7 August 2024
11:00
Scorecard

| Hampshire; 295/8 (50 overs) | v | Derbyshire; 152 (36.1 overs) |
| Joe Weatherley 93 (125); Daryn Dupavillon 3/52 (9 overs) | | Brooke Guest 44 (50); Dominic Kelly 5/19 (6.1 overs) |

Hampshire won by 143 runs
Rose Bowl, Southampton
Umpires: Hassan Adnan and Anthony Harris

- Derbyshire won the toss and elected to field.

7 August 2024
11:00
Scorecard

| Northamptonshire; 155 (37.3 overs) | v | Somerset; 156/3 (24.2 overs) |
| Saif Zaib 57 (69); Lewis Goldsworthy 2/4 (2 overs) | | Andrew Umeed 63 (66); Justin Broad 2/24 (5 overs) |

Somerset won by 7 wickets (DLS method)
County Ground, Northampton
Umpires: Neil Bainton and Rob White

- Northamptonshire won the toss and elected to bat.
- The match was reduced to 49 overs per side due to rain.

7 August 2024
11:00
Scorecard

| Kent; 259 (47.3 overs) | v | Worcestershire; 260/7 (46.5 overs) |
| Grant Stewart 78 (60); Fateh Singh 3/51 (8 overs) | | Jake Libby 75 (68); Grant Stewart 3/73 (10 overs) |

Worcestershire won by 3 wickets (DLS method)
New Road, Worcester
Umpires: Nigel Llong and Simon Widdup

- Worcestershire won the toss and elected to field.
- The match was reduced to 48 overs per side due to rain.
- Worcestershire were set a revised target of 259 runs from 48 overs due to rain.

8 August 2024
11:00
Scorecard

| Lancashire; 233/9 (48 overs) | v | Middlesex; 233/5 (46.4 overs) |
| Rocky Flintoff 88 (115); Henry Brookes 4/43 (10 overs) | | Joe Cracknell 98 (123); Jack Morley 3/45 (9.4 overs) |

Middlesex won by 5 wickets (DLS method)
Old Trafford Cricket Ground, Manchester
Umpires: Neil Pratt and James Tredwell

- Lancashire won the toss and elected to bat.
- The match was reduced to 48 overs per side due to rain.

9 August 2024
11:00
Scorecard

| Derbyshire; 206 (46.3 overs) | v | Kent; 207/7 (45.2 overs) |
| Brooke Guest 85 (117); Matt Parkinson 3/23 (10 overs) | | Jack Leaning 81* (117); Samit Patel 3/30 (10 overs) |

Kent won by 7 wickets
County Ground, Derby
Umpires: Phil Mustard and James Tredwell

- Kent won the toss and elected to field.

9 August 2024
11:00
Scorecard

| Durham; 257 (49.5 overs) | v | Hampshire; 113 (26.1 overs) |
| Colin Ackermann 96 (98); Dominic Kelly 3/48 (10 overs) | | Fletcha Middleton 26 (28); Paul Coughlin 3/41 (8 overs) |

Durham won by 144 runs
Riverside Ground, Chester-le-Street
Umpires: Naeem Ashraf and Graham Lloyd

- Hampshire won the toss and elected to field.

9 August 2024
11:00
Scorecard

| Worcestershire; 263 (47.3 overs) | v | Somerset; 267/5 (44.3 overs) |
| Tom Taylor 73 (65); Ben Green 3/58 (9 overs) | | Lewis Goldsworthy 95 (108); Fateh Singh 4/52 (10 overs) |

Somerset won by 5 wickets
County Ground, Taunton
Umpires: Anthony Harris and Sam Hollingshead

- Somerset won the toss and elected to field.

11 August 2024
11:00
Scorecard

| Durham; 307 (50 overs) | v | Kent; 300/9 (50 overs) |
| Ben McKinney 115 (116); Jaydn Denly 3/15 (2 overs) | | Harry Finch 104 (91); George Drissell 4/30 (10 overs) |

Durham won by 7 runs
St Lawrence Ground, Canterbury
Umpires: Casper Viljoen and Chris Watts

- Kent won the toss and elected to bat.
- Ben McKinney (Durham) scored his first century in List A cricket.

11 August 2024
11:00
Scorecard

| Middlesex; 135 (39.3 overs) | v | Somerset; 138/2 (27 overs) |
| Luke Hollman 38* (71); Riley Meredith 4/27 (8 overs) | | James Rew 53* (43); Ethan Bamber 1/20 (5 overs) |

Somerset won by 8 wickets
Lord's, London
Umpires: Steve O'Shaughnessy and Bilal Shafayat

- Somerset won the toss and elected to field.

11 August 2024
11:00
Scorecard

| Lancashire; 240/9 (50 overs) | v | Northamptonshire; 236/8 (50 overs) |
| George Balderson 53 (67); Saif Zaib 3/44 (10 overs) | | Justin Broad 63 (98); Jack Morley 2/44 (10 overs) |

Lancashire won by 4 runs
County Ground, Northampton
Umpires: Graeme Cross and Nigel Llong

- Lancashire won the toss and elected to bat.

11 August 2024
11:00
Scorecard

| Hampshire; 164 (47.4 overs) | v | Worcestershire; 165/2 (36.2 overs) |
| Dominic Kelly 45 (95); Jack Home 3/33 (9 overs) | | Ed Pollock 67 (60); Nick Gubbins 1/15 (4 overs) |

Worcestershire won by 8 wickets
New Road, Worcester
Umpires: Ian Blackwell and Ben Peverall

- Hampshire won the toss and elected to bat.

14 August 2024
11:00
Scorecard

| Durham; 253 (49.5 overs) | v | Derbyshire; 256/6 (48.5 overs) |
| Scott Borthwick 104 (126); Harry Moore 3/45 (9 overs) | | David Lloyd 63 (72); Ben Raine 4/30 (10 overs) |

Derbyshire won by 4 wickets
Riverside Ground, Chester-le-Street
Umpires: Naeem Ashraf and Paul Pollard

- Derbyshire won the toss and elected to field.
- Scott Borthwick (Durham) scored his first century in List A cricket.

14 August 2024
11:00
Scorecard

| Kent; 82 (35.1 overs) | v | Northamptonshire; 86/1 (14 overs) |
| Jaydn Denly 22 (49); Yuzvendra Chahal 5/14 (10 overs) | | James Sales 33* (37); Beyers Swanepoel 1/23 (4 overs) |

Northamptonshire won by 9 wickets
St Lawrence Ground, Canterbury
Umpires: Ben Debenham and Surendiran Shanmugam

- Kent won the toss and elected to bat.

14 August 2024
11:00
Scorecard

| Lancashire; 237 (50 overs) | v | Worcestershire; 234 (49 overs) |
| Josh Bohannon 87 (123); Tom Hinley 3/58 (10 overs) | | Jake Libby 83 (104); Charlie Barnard 3/47 (10 overs) |

Lancashire won by 3 runs
Old Trafford Cricket Ground, Manchester
Umpires: Bilal Shafayat and Simon Widdup

- Worcestershire won the toss and elected to field.

14 August 2024
11:00
Scorecard

| Hampshire; 276/7 (50 overs) | v | Middlesex; 257 (48.1 overs) |
| Toby Albert 75* (53); Luke Hollman 4/62 (10 overs) | | Mark Stoneman 53 (64); Kyle Abbott 4/48 (9.1 overs) |

Hampshire won by 19 runs
Radlett Cricket Club, Radlett
Umpires: Mark Newell and Chris Watts

- Middlesex won the toss and elected to field.

== Group B fixtures ==
24 July 2024
11:00
Scorecard

| Essex; 324/7 (50 overs) | v | Warwickshire; 328/3 (47.4 overs) |
| Nick Browne 75 (90); Oliver Hannon-Dalby 3/69 (10 overs) | | Ed Barnard 173* (140); Tom Westley 1/36 (6 overs) |

Warwickshire won by 7 wickets
County Ground, Chelmsford
Umpires: Neil Bainton and James Tredwell

- Warwickshire won the toss and elected to field.
- Simon Fernandes (Essex) and Theo Wylie (Warwickshire) both made their List A debuts.

24 July 2024
11:00
Scorecard

| Leicestershire; 369/6 (50 overs) | v | Nottinghamshire; 89/6 (14 overs) |
| Lewis Hill 81 (68); Lyndon James 3/105 (10 overs) | | Ben Slater 24 (36); Tom Scriven 3/20 (3 overs) |

Leicestershire won by 15 runs (DLS method)
Grace Road, Leicester
Umpires: Neil Pratt and Simon Widdup

- Nottinghamshire won the toss and elected to field.
- Nottinghamshire were set a revised target of 105 runs from 14 overs due to rain.
- Farhan Ahmed, Robert Lord and Freddie McCann (Nottinghamshire) all made their List A debuts.

25 July 2024
11:00
Scorecard

| Glamorgan; 187/8 (33 overs) | v | Gloucestershire; 160 (30.1 overs) |
| Ben Kellaway 65* (60); Dominic Goodman 3/53 (7 overs) | | James Bracey 86 (79); Dan Douthwaite 4/25 (7 overs) |

Glamorgan won by 27 runs
Sophia Gardens, Cardiff
Umpires: Paul Baldwin and Ben Peverall

- Gloucestershire won the toss and elected to field.
- The match was reduced to 33 overs per side due to rain.

25 July 2024
11:00
Scorecard

| Yorkshire; 240/6 (33 overs) | v | Surrey; 222/9 (33 overs) |
| Will Luxton 83 (79); Cameron Steel 2/58 (6 overs) | | Ben Foakes 40 (38); George Hill 3/41 (7 overs) |

Yorkshire won by 25 runs (DLS method)
The Oval, London
Umpires: Mark Newell and Sue Redfern

- Surrey won the toss and elected to field.
- The match was reduced to 33 overs per side due to rain.
- Surrey were set a revised target of 248 runs from 33 overs due to rain.

26 July 2024
14:00 (D/N)
Scorecard

| Leicestershire; 88 (25.4 overs) | v | Warwickshire; 92/2 (17.2 overs) |
| Ben Mike 21 (26); Ed Barnard 4/21 (7 overs) | | Will Rhodes 48* (48); Chris Wright 2/17 (5 overs) |

Warwickshire won by 8 wickets
Grace Road, Leicester
Umpires: Tom Lungley and James Tredwell

- Warwickshire won the toss and elected to field.

26 July 2024
11:00
Scorecard

| Sussex; 216 (47.1 overs) | v | Nottinghamshire; 217/2 (41.4 overs) |
| Fynn Hudson-Prentice 90 (109); Luke Fletcher 3/35 (9.1 overs) | | Ben Slater 107* (125); Henry Crocombe 1/32 (8 overs) |

Nottinghamshire won by 8 wickets
John Fretwell Sporting Complex, Warsop
Umpires: Rob Bailey and Richard Illingworth

- Sussex won the toss and elected to bat.
- Henry Rogers (Sussex) made his List A debut.

28 July 2024
11:00
Scorecard

| Essex; 262/8 (50 overs) | v | Gloucestershire; 199 (36.2 overs) |
| Luc Benkenstein 67 (63); Dominic Goodman 4/43 (10 overs) | | Ajeet Singh Dale 63 (34); Shane Snater 3/39 (10 overs) |

Essex won by 63 runs
County Ground, Bristol
Umpires: Bilal Shafayat and James Tredwell

- Gloucestershire won the toss and elected to field.

28 July 2024
11:00
Scorecard

| Nottinghamshire; 209 (48.4 overs) | v | Yorkshire; 126 (30.5 overs) |
| Lyndon James 76 (80); Ben Coad 4/14 (10 overs) | | Ben Coad 31 (24); Brett Hutton 6/38 (10 overs) |

Nottinghamshire won by 83 runs
John Fretwell Sporting Complex, Warsop
Umpires: Hassan Adnan and Nigel Llong

- Yorkshire won the toss and elected to field.

28 July 2024
11:00
Scorecard

| Surrey; 121 (34 overs) | v | Glamorgan; 123/3 (15.5 overs) |
| Ben Foakes 44 (70); Ben Kellaway 2/16 (7 overs) | | Colin Ingram 39* (26); James Taylor 1/32 (5.5 overs) |

Glamorgan won by 7 wickets
The Oval, London
Umpires: Jack Shantry and Casper Viljoen

- Glamorgan won the toss and elected to field.

28 July 2024
11:00
Scorecard

| Sussex; 173 (35.1 overs) | v | Warwickshire; 174/9 (44.1 overs) |
| Tom Haines 38 (44); Michael Booth 3/16 (6 overs) | | Will Rhodes 60 (102); Fynn Hudson-Prentice 3/34 (10 overs) |

Warwickshire won by 1 wicket
County Cricket Ground, Hove
Umpires: Ben Peverall and Mohammed Waseem

- Warwickshire won the toss and elected to field.

30 July 2024
11:00
Scorecard

| Gloucestershire; 301 (48.1 overs) | v | Surrey; 264 (47.5 overs) |
| Cameron Bancroft 100 (109); Conor McKerr 4/32 (9.1 overs) | | Ryan Patel 87 (96); Matt Taylor 4/44 (9.5 overs) |

Gloucestershier won by 37 runs
The Oval, London
Umpires: Richard Illingworth and Mark Newell

- Surrey won the toss and elected to field.

31 July 2024
11:00
Scorecard

| Essex; 290/9 (50 overs) | v | Leicestershire; 291/7 (47.3 overs) |
| Matt Critchley 55 (81); Liam Trevaskis 2/33 (10 overs) | | Sol Budinger 120 (120); Matt Critchley 3/55 (10 overs) |

Leicestershire won by 3 wickets
County Ground, Chelmsford
Umpires: Hassan Adnan and James Tredwell

- Leicestershire won the toss and elected to field.

31 July 2024
11:00
Scorecard

| Nottinghamshire; 274/9 (50 overs) | v | Glamorgan; 278/2 (45.3 overs) |
| Haseeb Hameed 89 (109); Andy Gorvin 5/55 (10 overs) | | Eddie Byrom 123* (131); Liam Patterson-White 1/40 (8 overs) |

Glamorgan won by 8 wickets
The Gnoll, Neath
Umpires: Anthony Harris and Simon Widdup

- Glamorgan won the toss and elected to field.
- Andy Gorvin (Glamorgan) took his first five-wicket haul in List A cricket.

31 July 2024
11:00
Scorecard

| Yorkshire; 261 (49.4 overs) | v | Sussex; 212 (44 overs) |
| Shan Masood 63 (79); Henry Crocombe 4/47 (9.4 overs) | | Tom Clark 55 (66); Ben Coad 2/29 (10 overs) |

Yorkshire won by 49 runs
Clifton Park Ground, York
Umpires: Neil Mallender and Steve O'Shaughnessy

- Sussex won the toss and elected to field.

2 August 2024
11:00
Scorecard

| Sussex; 200 (47.2 overs) | v | Glamorgan; 203/9 (48.3 overs) |
| Tom Haines 44 (69); Dan Douthwaite 4/44 (9 overs) | | Eddie Byrom 51 (46); Archie Lenham 3/29 (10 overs) |

Glamorgan won by 1 wicket
The Gnoll, Neath
Umpires: Naeem Ashraf and Anthony Harris

- Glamorgan won the toss and elected to field.

2 August 2024
11:00
Scorecard

| Warwickshire; 311/9 (50 overs) | v | Surrey; 308/9 (50 overs) |
| Chris Benjamin 76 (51); Cameron Steel 3/58 (10 overs) | | Dom Sibley 149 (142); Michael Booth 3/54 (10 overs) |

Warwickshire won by 3 runs
Rugby School Ground, Rugby
Umpires: Rob Bailey and Ben Peverall

- Surrey won the toss and elected to field.

2 August 2024
11:00
Scorecard

| Gloucestershire; 251/9 (overs) | v | Yorkshire; 215 (47.1 overs) |
| Ollie Price 98 (118); Ben Coad 2/27 (10 overs) | | Shan Masood 76 (68); Matthew Taylor 3/35 (10 overs) |

Gloucestershire won by 36 runs
Clifton Park Ground, York
Umpires: Phil Mustard and Jack Shantry

- Gloucestershire won the toss and elected to bat.

4 August 2024
11:00
Scorecard

| Glamorgan; 283 (49.4 overs) | v | Essex; 251 (46.4 overs) |
| Sam Northeast 89 (93); Shane Snater 3/45 (10 overs) | | Tom Westley 51 (73); Jamie McIlroy 3/33 (9 overs) |

Glamorgan won by 32 runs
County Ground, Chelmsford
Umpires: Ben Debenham and Phil Mustard

- Essex won the toss and elected to field.

4 August 2024
11:00
Scorecard

| Gloucestershire; 267 (49.4 overs) | v | Warwickshire; 271/4 (47.5 overs) |
| Jack Taylor 139* (115); Ed Barnard 3/16 (8 overs) | | Ed Barnard 152* (134); Ollie Price 1/27 (6 overs) |

Warwickshire won by 6 wickets
County Ground, Bristol
Umpires: Anthony Harris and David Millns

- Gloucestershire won the toss and elected to bat.

4 August 2024
11:00
Scorecard

| Nottinghamshire; 378/6 (50 overs) | v | Surrey; 271 (43.1 overs) |
| Ben Slater 164 (119); Conor McKerr 3/78 (10 overs) | | Dom Sibley 72 (81); Robert Lord 5/45 (10 overs) |

Nottinghamshire won by 107 runs
Woodbridge Road, Guildford
Umpires: Hassan Adnan and Bilal Shafayat

- Surrey won the toss and elected to field.
- Robert Lord (Nottinghamshire) took his first five-wicket haul in List A cricket.

4 August 2024
11:00
Scorecard

| Leicestershire; 363/7 (50 overs) | v | Sussex; 353/9 (50 overs) |
| Peter Handscomb 119 (80); Jack Carson 2/58 (10 overs) | | Tom Haines 129 (110); Ben Mike 3/63 (10 overs) |

Leicestershire won by 10 runs
County Cricket Ground, Hove
Umpires: Sam Hollingshead and Simon Widdup

- Sussex won the toss and elected to field.

6 August 2024
11:00
Scorecard

| Surrey; 296/6 (50 overs) | v | Leicestershire; 279 (49.2 overs) |
| Dom Sibley 105 (120); Ian Holland 2/50 (10 overs) | | Sol Budinger 70 (68); Cameron Steel 3/48 (10 overs) |

Surrey won by 17 runs
Kibworth Cricket Club New Ground, Kibworth
Umpires: Neil Pratt and Steve O'Shaughnessy

- Leicestershire won the toss and elected to field.
- Ollie Sykes (Surrey) and Sam Wood (Leicestershire) both made their List A debut.

6 August 2024
11:00
Scorecard

| Essex; 243/9 (50 overs) | v | Yorkshire; 244/7 (48.1 overs) |
| Luc Benkenstein 68 (94); Ben Coad 3/41 (10 overs) | | James Wharton 71 (89); Shane Snater 3/32 (10 overs) |

Yorkshire won by 3 wickets
North Marine Road, Scarborough
Umpires: Peter Hartley and James Tredwell

- Yorkshire won the toss and elected to field.

7 August 2024
11:00
Scorecard

| Sussex; 132/9 (41 overs) | v | Gloucestershire; 133/2 (20 overs) |
| Danial Ibrahim 30 (57); Ajeet Singh Dale 4/15 (9 overs) | | Cameron Bancroft 49* (53); Sean Hunt 2/32 (7 overs) |

Gloucestershire won by 8 wickets (DLS method)
County Ground, Bristol
Umpires: Paul Baldwin and Ian Blackwell

- Gloucestershire won the toss and elected to field.
- The match was reduced to 41 overs per side due to rain.
- Gloucestershire were set a revised target of 132 runs from 41 overs due to rain.

8 August 2024
11:00
Scorecard

| Glamorgan; 143/5 (18 overs) | v | Warwickshire |
| Sam Northeast 68* (39); Oliver Hannon-Dalby 2/21 (4 overs) |

No result
Edgbaston, Birmingham
Umpires: Anna Harris and Jack Shantry

- Glamorgan won the toss and elected to bat.
- The match was reduced to 18 overs per side due to rain.
- Rain prevented any further play.

8 August 2024
11:00
Scorecard

| Yorkshire; 236/7 (50 overs) | v | Leicestershire; 153/2 (19.4 overs) |
| Dom Bess 60 (51); Tom Scriven 2/35 (10 overs) | | Lewis Hill 71* (54); George Hill 1/18 (3 overs) |

Leicestershire won by 8 wickets (DLS method)
North Marine Road, Scarborough
Umpires: Naeem Ashraf and Ben Peverall

- Leicestershire won the toss and elected to field.
- Leicestershire were set a revised target of 150 runs from 22 overs due to rain.
- Alex Green (Leicestershire) made his List A debut.

9 August 2024
14:00 (D/N)
Scorecard

| Surrey; 306/4 (50 overs) | v | Essex; 217 (46 overs) |
| Josh Blake 100* (100); Jamie Porter 2/45 (10 overs) | | Tom Westley 78 (84); Cameron Steel 4/50 (10 overs) |

Surrey won by 89 runs
County Ground, Chelmsford
Umpires: Bilal Shafayat and Simon Widdup

- Surrey won the toss and elected to bat.
- Adam Thomas (Surrey) made his List A debut.
- Josh Blake (Surrey) scored his first century in List A cricket.

9 August 2024
11:00
Scorecard

| Nottinghamshire; 332 (49.3 overs) | v | Gloucestershire; 333/3 (46.4 overs) |
| Haseeb Hameed 105 (95); Graeme Van Buuren 3/40 (7.3 overs) | | Miles Hammond 157 (113); Freddie McCann 1/48 (6.4 overs) |

Gloucestershire won by 7 wickets
Trent Bridge, Nottingham
Umpires: Ben Peverall and Mohammed Waseem

- Gloucestershire won the toss and elected to field.

11 August 2024
11:00
Scorecard

| Leicestershire; 271/8 (50 overs) | v | Glamorgan; 262 (48.4 overs) |
| Peter Handscomb 103 (94); Timm van der Gugten 5/49 (10 overs) | | Colin Ingram 68 (68); Liam Trevaskis 4/54 (10 overs) |

Leicestershire won by 9 runs
Grace Road, Leicester
Umpires: Peter Hartley and Simon Widdup

- Glamorgan won the toss and elected to field.

11 August 2024
11:00
Scorecard

| Nottinghamshire; 218 (47.2 overs) | v | Essex; 219/3 (43.3 overs) |
| Matthew Montgomery 52 (72); Jamal Richards 5/31 (8.2 overs) | | Robin Das 100* (119); Robert Lord 2/42 (8 overs) |

Essex won by 7 wickets
Trent Bridge, Nottingham
Umpires: Anthony Harris and Phil Mustard

- Essex won the toss and elected to field.
- Jamal Richards (Essex) took his first five-wicket haul in List A cricket.
- Robin Das (Essex) scored his first century in List A cricket.

11 August 2024
11:00
Scorecard

| Surrey; 242 (47.4 overs) | v | Sussex; 243/4 (47.3 overs) |
| Ben Geddes 81 (92); Ollie Robinson 3/40 (7.4 overs) | | Tom Alsop 108* (130); Yousef Majid 1/34 (4 overs) |

Sussex won by 6 wickets
County Cricket Ground, Hove
Umpires: Mark Newell and Mohammed Waseem

- Surrey won the toss and elected to bat.
- Seb Stuart-Reckling (Surrey) made his List A debut.

11 August 2024
11:00
Scorecard

| Warwickshire; 242/9 (50 overs) | v | Yorkshire; 246/4 (44.3 overs) |
| Rob Yates 72 (107); George Hill 6/28 (10 overs) | | William Luxton 105* (121); Jake Lintott 2/44 (10 overs) |

Yorkshire won by 6 wickets
Rugby School Ground, Rugby
Umpires: Hassan Adnan and Tom Lungley

- Yorkshire won the toss and elected to field.
- Yash Vagadia (Yorkshire) made his List A debut.
- George Hill took his first five-wicket haul in List A cricket.

14 August 2024
11:00
Scorecard

| Glamorgan; 230/9 (47 overs) | v | Yorkshire; 168 (42 overs) |
| Billy Root 66 (68); Benjamin Cliff 3/37 (7 overs) | | Jonny Tattersall 51 (68); Andy Gorvin 4/35 (8 overs) |

Glamorgan won by 62 runs
Sophia Gardens, Cardiff
Umpires: Paul Baldwin and Sam Hollingshead

- Yorkshire won the toss and elected to field.
- The match was reduced to 47 overs per side due to rain.
- Noah Kelly (Yorkshire) made his List A debut.

14 August 2024
11:00
Scorecard

| Gloucestershire; 192/9 (36 overs) | v | Leicestershire; 199/6 (33.4 overs) |
| Cameron Bancroft 36 (51); Tom Scriven 3/37 (7 overs) | | Peter Handscomb 65* (70); Tom Smith 2/30 (7.4 overs) |

Leicestershire won by 4 wickets (DLS method)
County Ground, Bristol
Umpires: Ben Peverall and Mohammed Waseem

- Leicestershire won the toss and elected to field.
- The match was reduced to 36 overs per side due to rain.
- Leicestershire were set a revised target of 196 runs from 36 overs due to rain.

14 August 2024
11:00
Scorecard

| Sussex; 226/9 (50 overs) | v | Essex; 227/5 (45.2 overs) |
| John Simpson 69 (80); Jamie Porter 4/34 (10 overs) | | Tom Westley 77 (68); Archie Lenham 1/44 (10 overs) |

Essex won by 5 wickets
County Cricket Ground, Hove
Umpires: James Tredwell and Casper Viljoen

- Sussex won the toss and elected to bat.

14 August 2024
11:00
Scorecard

| Warwickshire; 182 (46.3 overs) | v | Nottinghamshire; 135/5 (28 overs) |
| Ed Barnard 31 (32); Liam Patterson-White 4/26 (10 overs) | | Jack Haynes 57* (71); Jake Lintott 3/38 (7 overs) |

Nottinghamshire won by 12 runs (DLS method)
Rugby School Ground, Rugby
Umpires: Graeme Cross and Anthony Harris

- Nottinghamshire won the toss and elected to field.
- The match was reduced to 48 overs per side due to rain.
- Rain prevented any further play.
- Zen Malik (Warwickshire) made his List A debut.

== Knockout stage ==
The winner of each group will progress straight to the semi-finals, with the second and third placed teams playing a play-off match against a team from the other group which will make up the play-offs. The winner of each play-off will play one of the group winners in the semi-finals.

Quarter-finals
B2 | Leicestershire | 291/7 (49.5)
A3 | Hampshire | 290/8 (50)
A2 | Worcestershire | 286/9 (50)
B3 | Warwickshire | 288/6 (49)

Semi-finals
A1 | Somerset | 334/4 (50)
QF2 | Leicestershire | 311/9 (50)
B1 | Glamorgan | 247/9 (50)
QF1 | Warwickshire | 208 (46.1)

Final
SF1 | Somerset | 171/6 (20)
SF2 | Glamorgan | 186/7 (20)

=== Quarter-finals ===
16 August 2024
11:00
Scorecard

| Worcestershire; 286/9 (50 overs) | v | Warwickshire; 288/6 (49 overs) |
| Jake Libby 112 (115); Michael Rae 3/54 (9 overs) | | Kai Smith 130* (104); Jack Home 1/31 (6 overs) |

Warwickshire won by 4 wickets
Edgbaston, Birmingham
Umpires: Peter Hartley and Rob White

- Warwickshire won the toss and elected to field.
- Kai Smith (Warwickshire) scored his first century in List A cricket.

16 August 2024
11:00
Scorecard

| Hampshire; 290/8 (50 overs) | v | Leicestershire; 291/7 (49.5 overs) |
| Nick Gubbins 136 (139); Tom Scriven 3/61 (9 overs) | | Peter Handscomb 74 (53); John Turner 4/44 (10 overs) |

Leicestershire won by 3 wickets
Grace Road, Leicester
Umpires: David Millns and Surendiran Shanmugam

- Leicestershire won the toss and elected to field.

=== Semi-finals ===
18 August 2024
11:00
Scorecard

| Somerset; 334/4 (50 overs) | v | Leicestershire; 311/9 (50 overs) |
| Lewis Goldsworthy 115* (86); Roman Walker 2/63 (10 overs) | | Peter Handscomb 111 (86); Ben Green 3/63 (10 overs) |

Somerset won by 23 runs
County Ground, Taunton
Umpires: Ian Blackwell and Jack Shantry

- Leicestershire won the toss and elected to field.

18 August 2024
11:00
Scorecard

| Glamorgan; 247/9 (50 overs) | v | Warwickshire; 208 (46.1 overs) |
| Dan Douthwaite 55* (35); Ed Barnard 4/34 (10 overs) | | Michael Burgess 85 (94); Jamie McIlroy 3/42 (9 overs) |

Glamorgan won by 39 runs
Sophia Gardens, Cardiff
Umpires: Nigel Llong and Neil Pratt

- Warwickshire won the toss and elected to field.

=== Final ===
22–23 September 2024
11:00
Scorecard

| Glamorgan; 186/7 (20 overs) | v | Somerset; 171/6 (20 overs) |
| Sam Northeast 63* (49); George Thomas 2/23 (4 overs) | | Andrew Umeed 45 (36); Ben Kellaway 2/37 (4 overs) |

Glamorgan won by 15 runs
Trent Bridge, Nottingham
Umpires: David Millns and Rob White
Player of the match: Sam Northeast (Glamorgan)

- Somerset won the toss and elected to field.
- Match postponed to Monday due to rain.
- The match reduced to 20 overs per side due to rain.
