= Archie Vaughan =

English cricketer (born 2005)

Personal information
- Full name: Archie Matthew Vaughan
- Born: 9 December 2005 (age 20); Sheffield, South Yorkshire, England
- Batting: Right-handed
- Bowling: Right-arm off break
- Role: All-rounder
- Relatives: Michael Vaughan (father)

Domestic team information
- Years: Team
- 2024–present: Somerset (squad no. 66)
- FC debut: 29 August 2024 Somerset v Durham
- List A debut: 26 July 2024 Somerset v Kent

Career statistics
Competition	First-class	List A
Matches	31	25
Runs scored	1,073	625
Batting average	23.84	32.89
100s/50s	0/4	1/4
Top score	80	109*
Balls bowled	3,561	558
Wickets	54	15
Bowling average	30.50	31.93
5 wickets in innings	3	0
10 wickets in match	1	0
Best bowling	6/96	3/41
Catches/stumpings	17/–	14/–
- Source: ESPNcricinfo, 27 September 2026

Archie Matthew Vaughan (born 9 December 2005) is an English cricketer who plays for Somerset and the England national under-19 cricket team. He is a right handed batsman and right arm off spin bowler. He made his List A cricket debut on 26 July 2024 in the One-Day Cup against Kent. He is the son of former England Test captain Michael Vaughan.

== Early life and education ==
Born in Sheffield, Vaughan and his sister Tallula are the children of Nichola and Michael Vaughan. He was educated at Millfield where he captained the first-XI cricket team. He played for Baslow CC in Derbyshire before moving on to play for Alderley Edge. He also played age-group cricket for Cheshire.

== Career ==
He played for Somerset County Cricket Club at under-15 through to under-18 level, prior to signing for the Somerset Cricket Academy. In April 2024, he opened the batting for Somerset second-XI alongside Jack Leach against Yorkshire second-XI at Headingley, scoring 61 runs. In May 2024, he signed a two and-a-half year professional contract with Somerset.

Vaughan made his List A debut for Somerset against Kent at Taunton on 26 July 2024 in the One-Day Cup, but took no wickets and was run out without facing a ball. He made his first-class debut in that year's County Championship, for Somerset against Durham at Taunton on 29 August, and took his maiden first-class wicket the following day with only his sixth delivery.

In just his second first-class appearance on 9–12 September 2024, Vaughan proved the "match-winner" as Somerset "pulled off one of the greatest County Championship victories in their history" by defeating Championship leaders and reigning champions Surrey. Having taken his maiden five-wicket haul in their first innings, he added another five wickets in their second to complete a ten-wicket haul and finish with match figures of 11/140. He scored his maiden century in the One-Day Cup against Northants on 26 August 2025, scoring an unbeaten 109.

Vaughan signed a new three-year contract with Somerset in November 2025, tying him into the club until at least the end of the 2028 season.

== International career ==
Archie Vaughan made his international debut for England national Under-19 Team in June 2024 and was picked in January 2025 to captain England's Young Lions to play three youth one-day internationals and two youth Tests against South Africa national under-19 cricket team in South Africa.

He played for a Young Lions Invitational XI against England U19 at Loughborough in June 2024 and, whilst bowling, took the wicket of Rocky Flintoff, son of his father's former England teammate Andrew. The following week, Vaughan was called-up to the England national under-19 cricket team.

He was again recalled to play youth Test against India national under-19 cricket team in July 2025. In the second innings of the first youth Test he took 6 wickets.
