= Corey Flintoff (cricketer) =

English cricketer

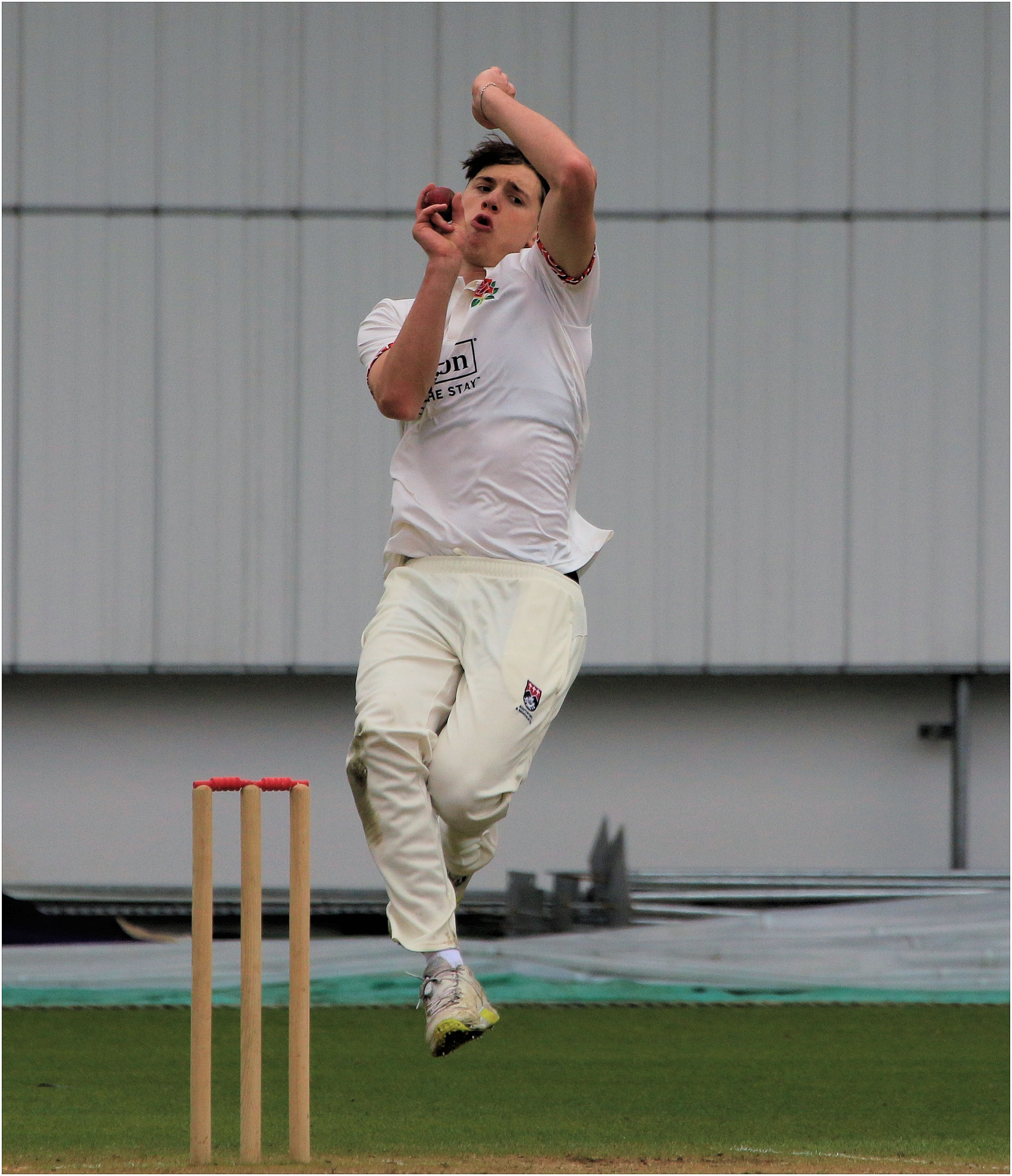
- Flintoff in 2024

Personal information
- Full name: Corey Leigh Flintoff
- Born: 8 March 2006 (age 20); Wythenshawe, Cheshire, England
- Batting: Right-handed
- Bowling: Right-arm medium-fast
- Role: All-rounder
- Relatives: Andrew Flintoff (father); Rocky Flintoff (brother)

Domestic team information
- Years: Team
- 2025: Kent (squad no. 22)
- FC debut: 15 September 2025 Kent v Leicestershire
- LA debut: 19 August 2025 Kent v Middlesex

Career statistics
| Competition | First-class | List A |
|---|---|---|
| Matches | 2 | 4 |
| Runs scored | 11 | 70 |
| Batting average | 5.50 | 35.00 |
| 100s/50s | 0/0 | 0/0 |
| Top score | 11 | 29* |
| Balls bowled | 180 | 132 |
| Wickets | 0 | 1 |
| Bowling average | – | 121.00 |
| 5 wickets in innings | – | 0 |
| 10 wickets in match | – | 0 |
| Best bowling | – | 1/44 |
| Catches/stumpings | 1/– | 4/– |
- Source: CricInfo, 28 September 2025

Corey Leigh Flintoff (born 8 March 2006) is an English cricketer who plays for Kent County Cricket Club. He is a right-handed batsman and right arm fast-medium bowler.

== Early life ==
Born at Wythenshawe, Flintoff was educated at Manchester Grammar School and played club cricket for St Annes Cricket Club and in the Liverpool Premier League for Southport and Birkdale. His father, Andrew Flintoff, played as an all-rounder for Lancashire and the England cricket team, and one of his three siblings, Rocky Flintoff has played first-class cricket.

== Career ==
Flintoff played age-group cricket for Lancashire and was a member of the club's academy. He made his Second XI debut for the county in April 2024 against Durham Second XI.

He played on trial for Kent in the spring of 2025, and signed a two-year rookie contract in March 2025. He subsequently made his professional debut on 19 August 2025 against Middlesex in the One Day Cup.
