= Harry Came =

English cricketer (born 1998)

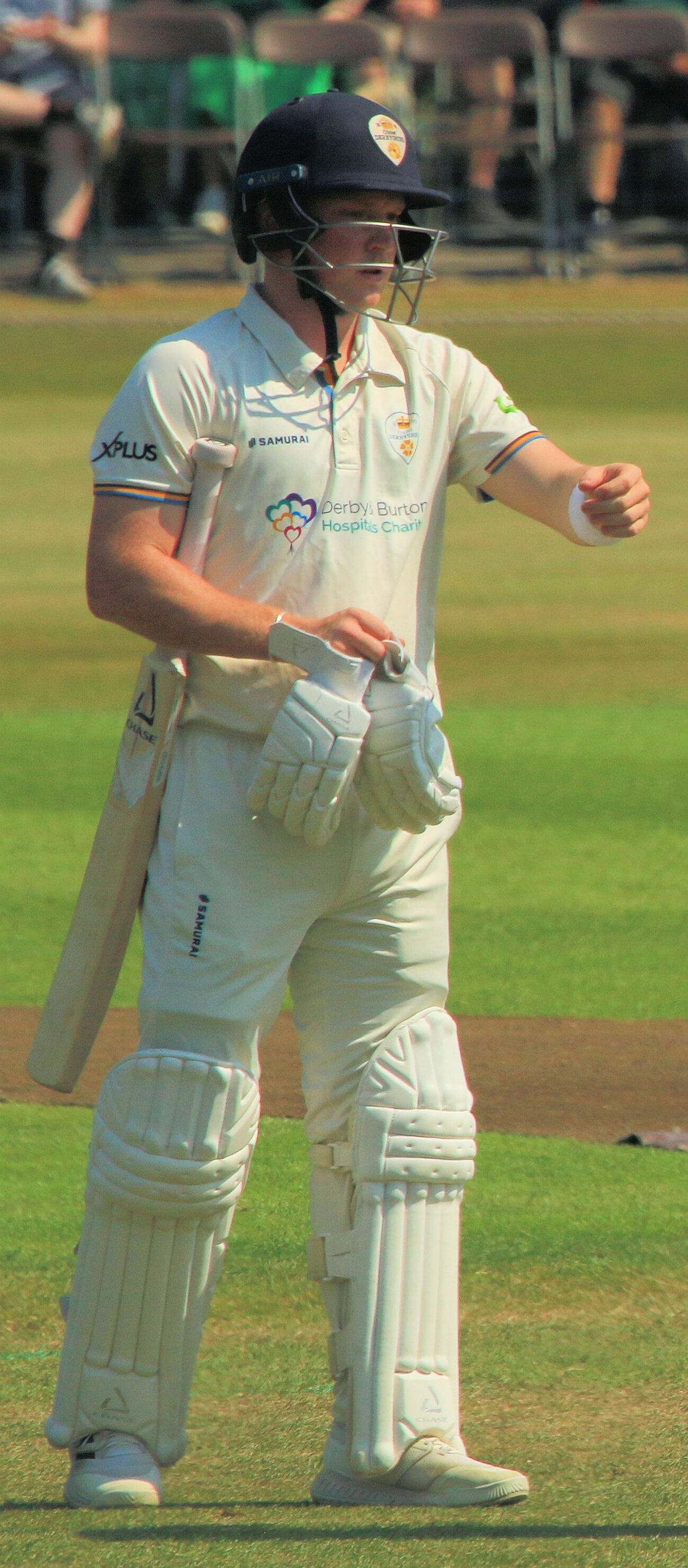
- Came in 2023

Personal information
- Full name: Harry Robert Charles Came
- Born: 27 August 1998 (age 28); Basingstoke, Hampshire, England
- Batting: Right-handed
- Bowling: Right-arm off break

Domestic team information
- Years: Team
- 2019–2020: Hampshire (squad no. 4)
- 2021–: Derbyshire (squad no. 4)
- First-class debut: 20 August 2019 Hampshire v Surrey
- List A debut: 22 July 2021; Derbyshire v Leicestershire

Career statistics
| Competition | FC | LA | T20 |
|---|---|---|---|
| Matches | 60 | 44 | 34 |
| Runs scored | 2,927 | 1,492 | 740 |
| Batting average | 30.81 | 36.39 | 25.51 |
| 100s/50s | 4/21 | 2/8 | 0/2 |
| Top score | 141* | 139 | 56 |
| Catches/stumpings | 17/– | 12/– | 15/– |
- Source: Cricinfo, 27 September 2026

Harry Robert Charles Came (born 27 August 1998) is an English cricketer who currently plays for Derbyshire. Came is the great-grandson of England test cricketer Walter Robins.

He made his first-class debut on 20 August 2019, for Hampshire in the 2019 County Championship, as a concussion replacement for Aneurin Donald. Came was released by Hampshire ahead of the 2021 County Championship.

On 8 June 2021, Came signed for Derbyshire until the end of the 2023 season. He made his Twenty20 debut on 11 June 2021, for Derbyshire in the 2021 T20 Blast. He made his List A debut on 22 July 2021, for Derbyshire against Leicestershire in the 2021 One-Day Cup, His first List A century came in the 2024 One-Day Cup, when he made an unbeaten 113 against Middlesex on 27 July.
