= Joe Heywood =

English cricketer (born 2006)

Personal information
- Full name: Joe Patrick Heywood
- Born: 27 October 2006 (age 20); Bath, Somerset, England
- Batting: Right-handed
- Bowling: Right-arm fast-medium
- Role: Bowler

Domestic team information
- Years: Team
- 2024: Somerset (squad no. 11)
- List A debut: 28 July 2024 Somerset v Hampshire

Career statistics
| Competition | List A |
|---|---|
| Matches | 1 |
| Runs scored | 0 |
| Batting average | – |
| 100s/50s | 0/0 |
| Top score | 0* |
| Balls bowled | 6 |
| Wickets | 0 |
| Bowling average | – |
| 5 wickets in innings | – |
| 10 wickets in match | – |
| Best bowling | – |
| Catches/stumpings | 0/– |
- Source: Cricinfo, 28 July 2024

Joe Patrick Heywood (born 27 October 2006) is an English cricketer. He made his List A debut for Somerset on 28 July 2024 in the 2024 One-Day Cup.
