= Robert Lord (cricketer) =

English cricketer (born 2001)

Personal information
- Born: 4 May 2001 (age 25); Salford, Manchester, England
- Batting: Right-handed
- Bowling: Right-arm medium
- Role: Bowler

Domestic team information
- Years: Team
- 2024–present: Nottinghamshire
- FC debut: 29 August 2024 Nottinghamshire v Surrey
- List A debut: 24 July 2024 Nottinghamshire v Warwickshire

Career statistics
Competition	FC	LA	T20
Matches	6	14	1
Runs scored	104	249	1
Batting average	13.00	49.80	1.00
100s/50s	0/0	0/2	0/0
Top score	31	83	1
Balls bowled	723	700	24
Wickets	12	24	1
Bowling average	40.41	29.41	24.00
5 wickets in innings	0	1	0
10 wickets in match	0	0	0
Best bowling	3/42	5/45	1/46
Catches/stumpings	3/–	7/–	0/–
- Source: Cricinfo, 18 August 2026

Robert Lord (born 4 May 2001) is an English cricketer who plays for Nottinghamshire County Cricket Club. He is a right handed batsman and right arm medium pace bowler.

== Early life ==
He completed his schooling at St Ambrose Barlow School and college at Myerscough College.

== Career ==
In 2019, he played under-17 County Cup and County Championship for Lancashire. Lord also played Second XI Championship and Second XI Trophy matches for Lancashire in 2019.

In 2022, he played National Counties Trophy and in 2023, he played National Counties Twenty20 matches for Cheshire.

He signed a professional contract with Nottinghamshire in July 2024. He made his List A debut against Warwickshire in the One-Day Cup on 24 July 2024. He made his first-class debut against Surrey in the County Championship on 29 August 2024. Lord signed a new two-year contract with Nottinghamshire in September 2024. He made his T20 debut for Nottinghamshire against Derbyshire on 13 June 2025.
