= Jamal Richards =

English cricketer (born 2004)

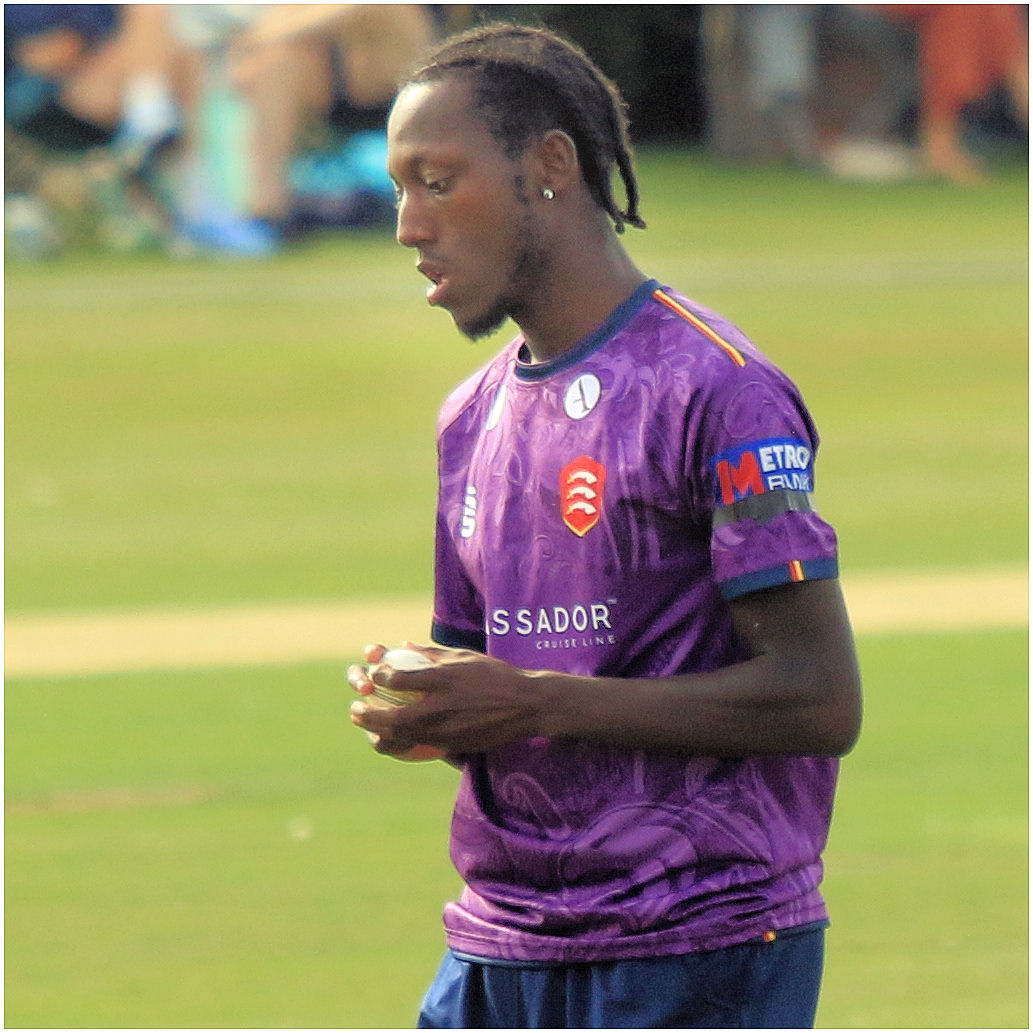
- Richards in 2024

Personal information
- Full name: Jamal Adrian Richards
- Born: 3 March 2004 (age 22); Edmonton, London, England
- Batting: Right-handed
- Bowling: Right-arm fast medium
- Role: All-Rounder

Domestic team information
- Years: Team
- 2022–2025: Essex (squad no. 87)
- 2025: → Kent (on loan)
- FC debut: 26 May 2023 Essex v Ireland
- LA debut: 5 August 2022 Essex v Derbyshire

Career statistics
Competition	First-class	List A
Matches	2	23
Runs scored	62	290
Batting average	31.00	24.16
100s/50s	0/0	0/0
Top score	43	46
Balls bowled	210	813
Wickets	5	24
Bowling average	36.20	31.54
5 wickets in innings	1	1
10 wickets in match	0	0
Best bowling	5/96	5/31
Catches/stumpings	1/–	3/–
- Source: Cricinfo, 23 August 2025

Jamal Adrian Richards (born 3 March 2004) is an English cricketer who most recently played for Essex County Cricket Club. He is a right-handed batsman and right arm fast medium pace bowler.

== Early life ==
From Edmonton, London, Richards attended Norlington School in Waltham Forest. He was introduced to cricket aged four by his Jamaican grandfather Franklin Dickson, who would take him to the cricket club in Walthamstow. He started playing age-group cricket with Essex in 2016, at eleven years-old. He represented London and the East of England at the Bunbury Cricket Festival in 2019.

== Career ==
Richards made his Second-XI debut for Essex in 2021 and signed a rookie contract with the club in early 2022. He made his debut in List A cricket for Essex on 5 August 2022, against Derbyshire at Chelmsford, with Richards top-scoring in the Essex innings with 46 from 44 balls. At the 2022 Essex end of season awards Richards won the first XI young player of the year award.

He signed a new contract with Essex in February 2023. Speaking soon after this, Richards said that he is focused on playing all formats of the game. Richards made his first-class cricket debut on 26 May 2023 as Essex played against Ireland at Chelmsford. He took 5–96 on debut.

Richards was the leading wicket-taker for Essex in the 2024 One-Day Cup with 15 scalps at an average of 24.86 and was rewarded with a new one-year contract in November that year.

In May 2025, he was called into a County Select XI to play the touring Zimbabwe national team in Leicester.

He left Essex in October 2025.

== Style of play ==
An all-rounder, Essex Cricket head coach Anthony McGrath was quoted in 2023 as saying that during his debut season Richards had displayed “moments of brilliance when featuring in our One-Day Cup side...Jamal is one of the brightest talents on the County circuit. He has raw pace with ball in hand and can hit it a long way with the bat too."

== International career ==
He played for England national under-19 cricket team and England Lions against Sri Lanka and Australia in the winter of 2022–2023.
