= Guy Home =

English cricketer

Personal information
- Full name: Guy Leonard Home
- Born: 13 September 1964 (age 62); Shrewsbury, Shropshire, England
- Batting: Left-handed
- Relatives: Milly Home (niece); Jack Home (nephew)

Domestic team information
- Years: Team
- 1991–2006: Shropshire

Career statistics
Competition	List A
Matches	6
Runs scored	39
Batting average	7.80
100s/50s	–/–
Top score	16
Catches/stumpings	–/–
- Source: Cricinfo, 2 July 2011

Guy Leonard Home (born 13 September 1964) is an English farmer and former cricketer.

The son of Jim Home, he was born at Shrewsbury. He was educated at Ellesmere College and the Royal Agricultural University. A farmer by profession, Home made his debut for Shropshire in minor counties cricket in the 1991 Minor Counties Championship against Dorset. He played minor counties cricket for Shropshire until 2006, making 44 appearances in the Minor Counties Championship and 17 appearances in the MCCA Knockout Trophy. In addition to playing minor counties cricket, Home also played List A cricket for Shropshire when they were permitted to take part in the domestic one-day competition alongside the first-class counties. He played his first List A match against Oxfordshire in the 2002 Cheltenham & Gloucester Trophy at Shifnal, before making five further List A appearances, captaining Shropshire against Hampshire at Whitchurch in the 2005 Cheltenham & Gloucester Trophy. In six List A matches, Home scored 39 runs with a high score of 16.

Outside of minor counties cricket, Home played club level cricket in Shropshire for Ellesmere, Shrewsbury, Shifnal, Wellington and Wroxeter.
