= Jack Home =

English cricketer (born 2006)

Personal information
- Full name: Jack Edward Home
- Born: 2 May 2006 (age 20)
- Batting: Right-handed
- Bowling: Right-arm medium-fast
- Relatives: Milly Home (sister); Guy Home (uncle)

Domestic team information
- Years: Team
- 2024–2026: Worcestershire (squad no. 24)
- First-class debut: 9 September 2024 Worcestershire v Warwickshire
- List A debut: 24 July 2024 Worcestershire v Middlesex

Career statistics
Competition	FC	LA	T20
Matches	3	8	1
Runs scored	112	19	1
Batting average	112.00	–	–
100s/50s	0/1	0/0	0/0
Top score	63*	13*	1*
Balls bowled	180	347	24
Wickets	2	19	1
Bowling average	86.00	18.94	33.00
5 wickets in innings	0	1	0
10 wickets in match	0	0	0
Best bowling	1/25	6/51	1/33
Catches/stumpings	1/–	1/–	0/–
- Source: Cricinfo, 10 May 2026

Jack Edward Home (born 2 May 2006) is an English professional cricketer who plays for Worcestershire County Cricket Club. He made his One-Day Cup debut on 24 July 2024.

== Career ==
From Shropshire, he joined the Worcestershire academy for the 2022-23 season and was retained for the following season.

He made his T20 Blast debut for Worcestershire on 18 July 2024 against Derbyshire. He made his One-Day Cup debut on 24 July 2024 with a home win against Middlesex, taking three wickets on debut. He claimed his first five-wicket haul on 2 August 2024, taking 6/51 against Derbyshire. He signed a new three-year contract with Worcestershire in September 2024.
