= Simon Fernandes (cricketer) =

English cricketer (born 2000)

Personal information
- Full name: Simon Maurice Louis Fernandes
- Born: 22 March 2000 (age 26); Colchester, England
- Batting: Right-handed
- Role: Wicket-keeper

Domestic team information
- Years: Team
- 2024–2026: Essex (squad no. 51)
- First-class debut: 10 October 2025 MCC v Zimbabwe A
- List A debut: 24 July 2024 Essex v Warwickshire

Career statistics
Competition	FC	LA	T20
Matches	1	23	5
Runs scored	71	297	21
Batting average	71.00	24.75	7.00
100s/50s	0/1	0/1	0/0
Top score	71	51	10*
Catches/stumpings	2/–	29/4	1/–
- Source: Cricinfo, 12 August 2026

Simon Maurice Louis Fernandes (born 22 March 2000) is an English cricketer who plays for Essex County Cricket Club. He is a right-handed batsman and wicket-keeper. He made his One-Day Cup debut on 24 July 2024 against Warwickshire.

== Career ==
Fernandes is from Colchester, Essex, and played club cricket in the county for Colchester & East Essex.

=== Essex ===
Fernandes became an Essex Pathway player at under-14 level, and made his Second XI Championship debut against Hampshire in August 2021. He signed a short term professional contract with Essex County Cricket Club in July 2024 and made his One-Day Cup debut on 24 July 2024, against Warwickshire. In January 2025, he played club cricket in the English winter in South Africa. He signed a rookie deal with Essex in April 2025 as an injury replacement for Michael Pepper. Having played as a substitute keeper in County Championship fixtures and in 16 One-Day Cup matches for the club, scoring 173 runs and taking 23 catches, he signed a two-year contract in October 2025. His top score in 2025 for Essex was 46 not out against Nottinghamshire. Essex Director of Cricket, Chris Silverwood said that "Simon’s journey is a brilliant example of hard work and perseverance paying off".

Fernandes made his first class cricket debut playing for the MCC against Zimbabwe A in Harare in October 2025, where he scored a career-best 71.
