= Yash Vagadia =

English cricketer

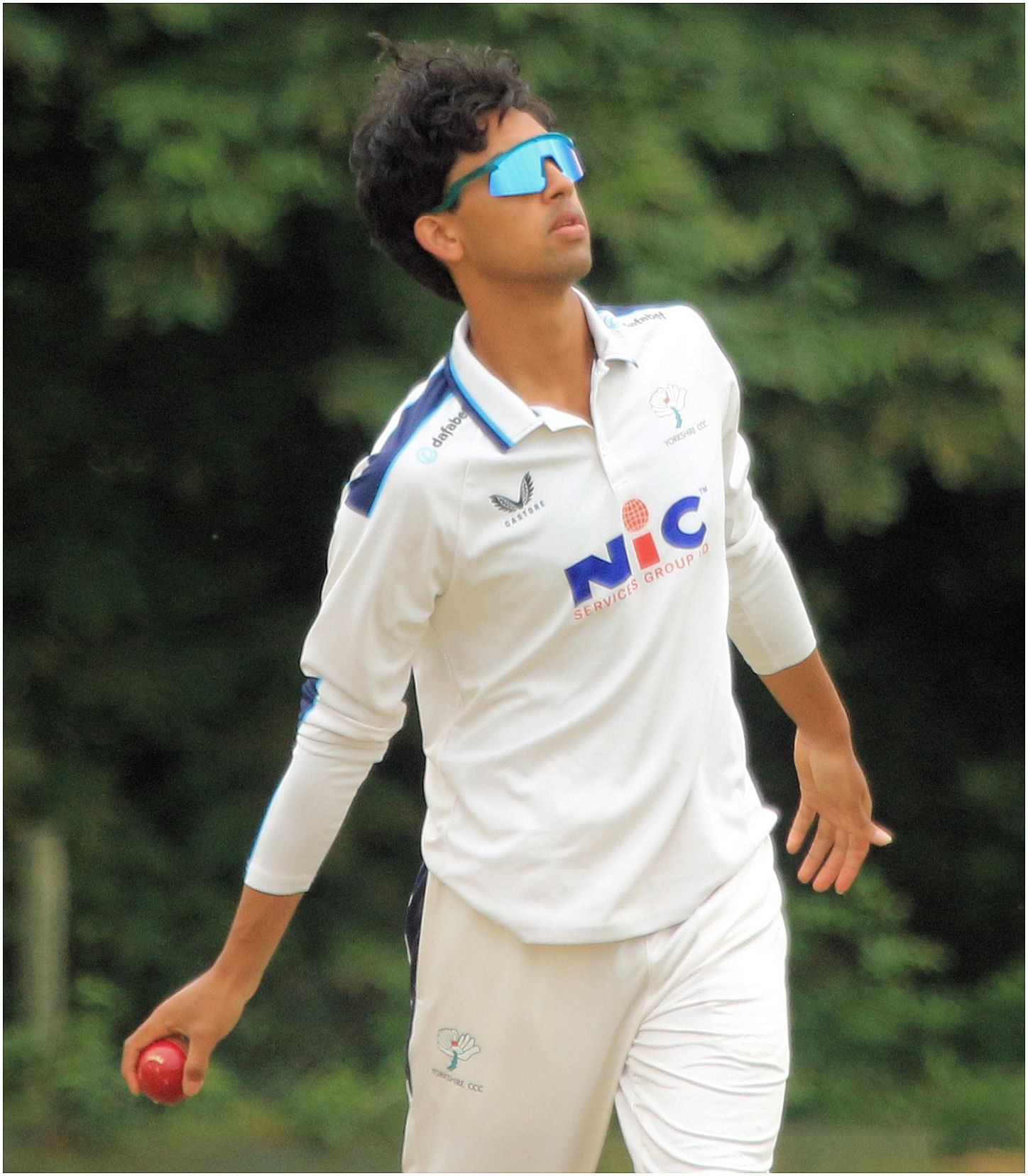
- Vagadia in 2025

Personal information
- Full name: Yash Vipul Vagadia
- Born: 7 May 2004 (age 22); Newcastle upon Tyne, England
- Batting: Right-handed
- Bowling: Right-arm medium
- Role: All rounder

Domestic team information
- Years: Team
- 2024: Yorkshire
- LA debut: 11 August 2024 Yorkshire v Warwickshire

Career statistics
Competition	List A
Matches	2
Runs scored	42
Batting average	11.00
100s/50s	0/0
Top score	21
Catches/stumpings	1/–
- Source: Cricinfo, 18 December 2024

Yash Vagadia (born 7 May 2004) is an English cricketer who plays for Yorkshire as an all-rounder. He is a right-handed batsman and right arm medium pace bowler. He made his One-Day Cup debut for Yorkshire on 11 August 2024 against Warwickshire.

== Early life ==
Born in Newcastle, he first played for Yorkshire at Under 14s level. He plays club cricket for Hartlepool. He was head boy at Teesside High School, in Eaglescliffe, where he earned 2 A* and an A in his A-Level examinations in August 2022. He later attended Durham University.

== Career ==
He joined the academy at Yorkshire county cricket club at the age of 11 years-old and captained the county's academy and under-18s teams. He signed his first rookie pro contract with Yorkshire in November 2022 having been named the Yorkshire academy player of the year. That season, he averaged over 50.00 with the bat at junior level. In July 2023, he extended his contract with Yorkshire by another year.

He made his One-Day Cup debut for Yorkshire in August 2024. That summer, he signed a two-year contract extension with Yorkshire.
