= Rocky Flintoff =

English cricketer (born 2008)

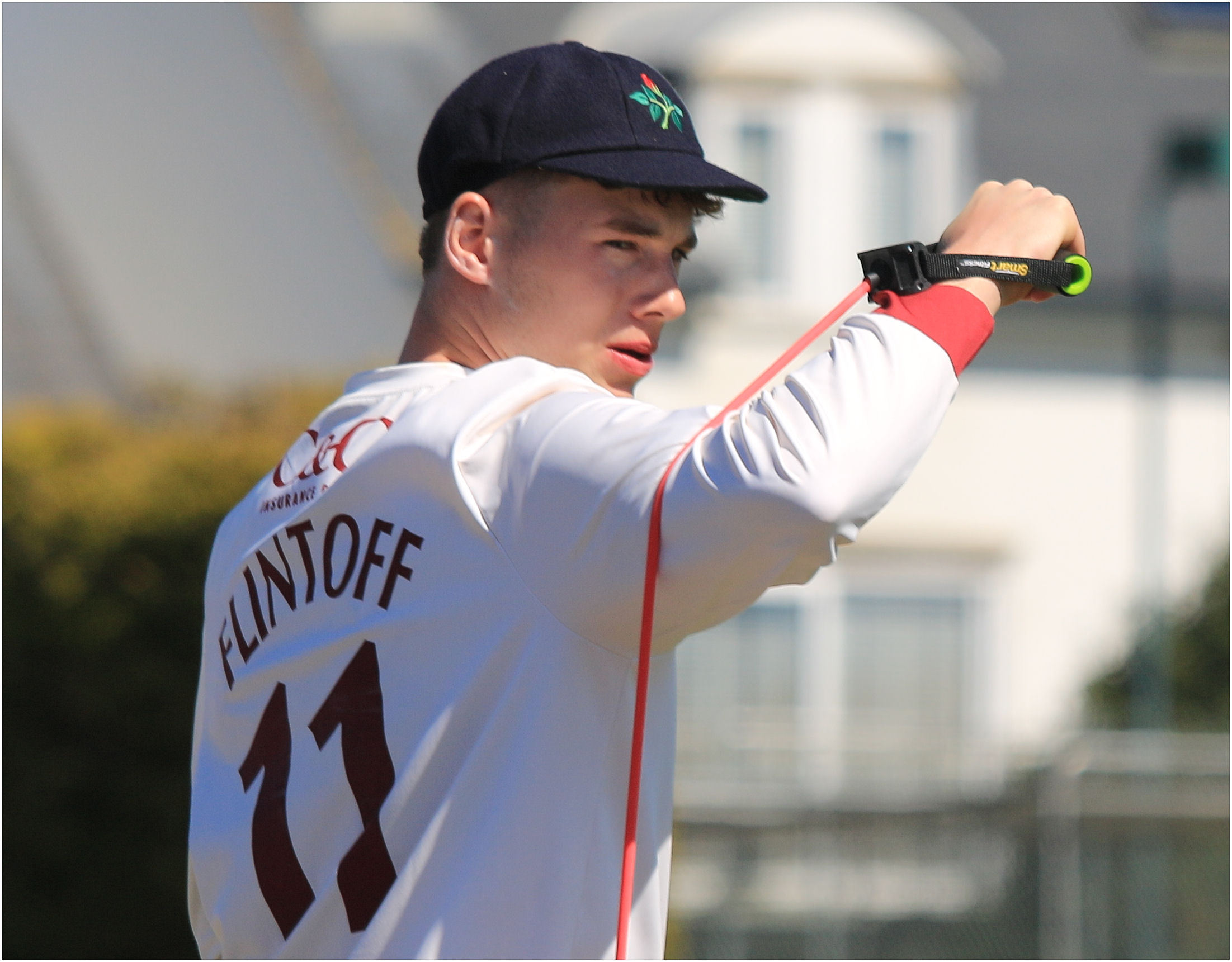
- Flintoff in 2026

Personal information
- Born: 7 April 2008 (age 18); Manchester, England
- Batting: Right-handed
- Bowling: Right-arm medium fast
- Role: All-rounder
- Relatives: Andrew Flintoff (father); Corey Flintoff (brother)

Domestic team information
- Years: Team
- 2024–2026: Lancashire (squad no. 11)
- FC debut: 22 August 2024 Lancashire v Surrey
- LA debut: 28 July 2024 Lancashire v Kent

Career statistics
Competition	First-class	List A
Matches	11	16
Runs scored	286	495
Batting average	15.05	38.07
100s/50s	0/1	1/2
Top score	65	123
Catches/stumpings	2/–	3/–
- Source: ESPNcricinfo, 27 September 2026

Rocky Flintoff (born 7 April 2008) is an English cricketer who plays for Lancashire County Cricket Club. A right-handed batsman and right arm fast-medium bowler, he is the youngest player to appear for Lancashire, and the youngest to score a century for the England Under-19s team.

== Early and personal life ==
The son of Andrew Flintoff and Rachael Wools Flintoff, he has three siblings. He attended Manchester Grammar School and joined Lancashire County Cricket Club at a young age. His brother, Corey, also played for the Lancashire academy.

== Career ==
Flintoff began playing cricket at Alderley Edge Cricket Club, Cheshire, and played for St Annes Cricket Club in 2020. He played for North at the Bunbury Festival in 2023 and made his debut in the August of that summer for Southport and Birkdale in the Liverpool and District Cricket Competition, scoring 76 from 98 balls on debut. He made his debut for Lancashire second-XI in April 2024, two days after his sixteenth birthday.

He made an unbeaten half-century in April 2024 for Lancashire second-XI against Durham second-XI, from 78 balls. The following week, he scored his first century for Lancs second-XI, making 116 from 165 balls against Warwickshire second-XI. His innings included 11 fours and three sixes and included a partnership of 39 with his older brother Corey. At the age of 16 years and 16 days old, he become the third youngest player to score a century in the 2nd XI Championship, and the youngest ever for Lancashire, beating the previous record of 16 years and 266 days held since 1994 by his father.

In June 2024, he signed a professional contract with Lancashire.

He made his List A debut for Lancashire against Kent in the One-Day Cup on 28 July 2024, becoming their youngest-ever player at the age of 16 years and 113 days.

Flintoff scored his maiden List A half-century when he hit 88 against Middlesex on 8 August 2024.

Flintoff made his first-class debut at the Oval on 22 August 2024, for Lancashire against Surrey in the County Championship. Aged 16 years and 137 days, he became the youngest player to represent county at this level, and scored 32 in his first innings.

In July 2025, he was drafted by 100 ball cricket side Northern Superchargers ahead of the 2025 The Hundred season. Flintoff did not play in any of the Superchargers' first three matches and then left the squad due to an unspecified injury.

In March 2026, Flintoff signed a contract extension with Lancashire tying him into the club until at least the end of the 2027 season.

On 11 August 2026, Flintoff hit his first senior professional century in Lancashire's One-Day Cup match against Somerset at Taunton. Flintoff hit 10 fours and seven sixes in an innings of 123 from 76 balls in Lancashire's 443/6.

== International career ==
In June 2024, he was called up to the England under-19 cricket team. Flintoff scored a match-winning 106 as the team beat a Young Lions Invitational XI in a warm-up match for their series against Sri Lanka. On 18 July 2024, Flintoff made a century in the second four-day match against Sri Lanka at the College Ground, Cheltenham, scoring 106 off 181 balls including eight fours and two sixes. Aged 16 years and 102 days, he became the youngest player to score a century for England U19s, beating the record set by Ian Bell who achieved the feat at 16 years and 313 days against New Zealand in February 1999.

In December 2024, he played for the England Lions against South Africa A on their tour of South Africa. He was subsequently included in the Lions squad to tour Australia in January 2025. On the tour, he broke his father Andrew's record as the youngest player to score a century for England Lions after scoring 126 against a Cricket Australia XI in Brisbane.
