= Tom Hinley =

English cricketer (born 2003)

Personal information
- Full name: Tom Ian Hinley
- Born: 5 February 2003 (age 23); Frimley, Surrey, England
- Batting: Left-handed
- Bowling: Slow left-arm wrist spin

Domestic team information
- Years: Team
- 2021–2023: Sussex (squad no. 42)
- 2024–present: Worcestershire (squad no. 42)
- First-class debut: 12 September 2021 Sussex v Leicestershire
- List A debut: 24 July 2024 Worcestershire v Middlesex

Career statistics
Competition	FC	LA	T20
Matches	2	9	5
Runs scored	25	96	26
Batting average	8.33	19.20	8.66
100s/50s	0/0	0/0	0/0
Top score	19	32	21
Balls bowled	190	411	66
Wickets	1	13	3
Bowling average	156.00	28.69	31.66
5 wickets in innings	0	1	0
10 wickets in match	0	0	0
Best bowling	1/121	5/56	1/11
Catches/stumpings	0/–	7/–	5/–
- Source: Cricinfo, 21 June 2025

Tom Ian Hinley (born 5 February 2003) is an English cricketer. In October 2018, Hinley was named the Sussex under-15 player of the year. He made his first-class debut on 12 September 2021, for Sussex in the 2021 County Championship.
