= Nathan Fernandes (cricketer) =

English cricketer

Personal information
- Full name: Nathan Shane Fernandes
- Born: 26 April 2004 (age 22); Margao, Goa, India
- Batting: Left-handed
- Bowling: Slow left-arm orthodox
- Role: All rounder

Domestic team information
- Years: Team
- 2023–present: Middlesex (squad no. 18)
- FC debut: 12 April 2024 Middlesex v Northants
- LA debut: 24 July 2024 Middlesex v Worcestershire

Career statistics
Competition	FC	LA	T20
Matches	14	24	7
Runs scored	478	740	11
Batting average	20.78	35.23	2.75
100s/50s	1/2	1/3	0/0
Top score	103	112	8
Balls bowled	313	324	78
Wickets	5	5	4
Bowling average	44.40	61.40	35.00
5 wickets in innings	0	0	0
10 wickets in match	0	0	0
Best bowling	3/53	2/31	1/6
Catches/stumpings	5/–	5/–	1/–
- Source: Cricinfo, 27 September 2026

Nathan Shane Fernandes (born 26 April 2004) is an English professional cricketer who plays for Middlesex County Cricket Club. He is a left-arm orthodox spin bowler and left-handed batsman. He made his first-class cricket debut for Middlesex on 12 April 2024 against Northants. He made his T20 Blast debut for Middlesex against Surrey on 25 May 2023.

== Early life ==
Fernandes is of Goan descent. He joined the Middlesex County Cricket Club Academy at U12 level. He was also a keen swimmer in his youth.

== Career ==
In 2022, he featured six times in the 2nd XI Championship for Middlesex Second XI, scoring 171 runs. He also represented the England Young Lions.

Fernandes made his T20 Cricket debut for Middlesex on 25 May 2022, against Surrey. He took a wicket with his second ball, bowling to Sunil Narine in the power play. In November 2022, Fernandes signed a first professional contract with Middlesex.

He made his First-class cricket debut for Middlesex against Northants on 12 April 2024 aged 19 years-old. He scored 103 in the Middlesex first innings to become the youngest Middlesex first-class debutant to score a century since 1862.

Fernandes signed a new contract with Middlesex in February 2025, tying him into the club until the end of the 2027 season.

== Personal life ==
Fernandes studied a Business and Management degree at Royal Holloway University.
