= Andrew Flintoff =

English cricketer and TV personality (born 1977)

Andrew Flintoff MBE
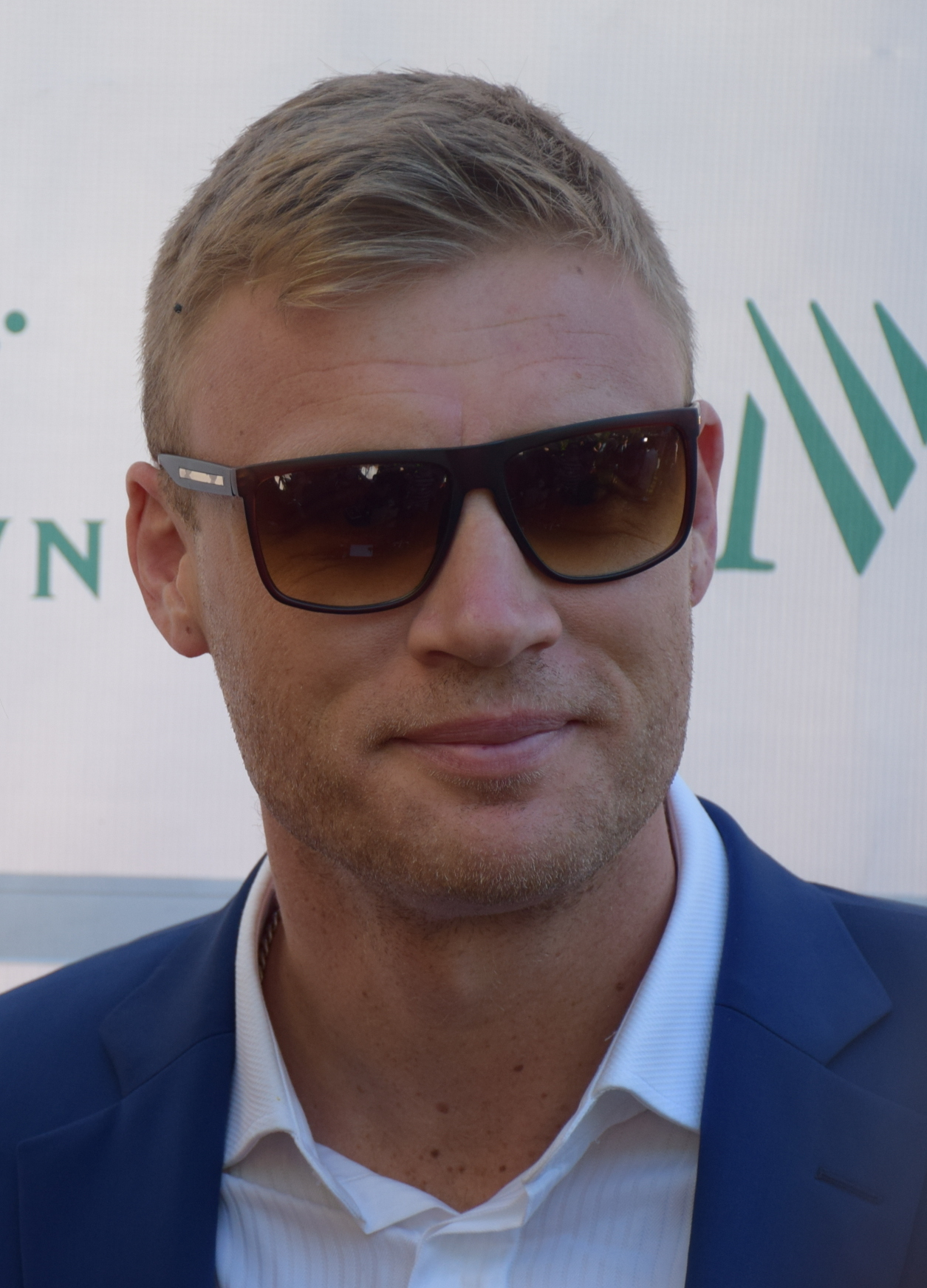
- Flintoff in 2016

Personal information
- Full name: Andrew Flintoff
- Born: 6 December 1977 (age 48); Preston, Lancashire, England
- Nickname: Freddie
- Height: 6 ft 4 in (1.93 m)
- Batting: Right-handed
- Bowling: Right-arm fast-medium
- Role: All-rounder
- Relatives: Rocky Flintoff (son); Corey Flintoff (son)

International information
- National side: England (1998–2009)
- Test debut (cap 591): 23 July 1998 v South Africa
- Last Test: 20 August 2009 v Australia
- ODI debut (cap 154): 7 April 1999 v Pakistan
- Last ODI: 3 April 2009 v West Indies
- ODI shirt no.: 11
- T20I debut (cap 2): 13 June 2005 v Australia
- Last T20I: 19 September 2007 v India

Domestic team information
- Years: Team
- 1995–2009, 2014: Lancashire (squad no. 26)
- 2009: Chennai Super Kings (squad no. 11)
- 2014/15: Brisbane Heat (squad no. 26)

Head coaching information
- Years: Team
- 2024–2025: Northern Superchargers
- 2024–: England Lions
- 2026–: Sydney Thunder

Career statistics
Competition	Test	ODI	T20I	FC
Matches	79	141	7	183
Runs scored	3,845	3,394	76	9,027
Batting average	31.77	32.01	12.66	33.80
100s/50s	5/26	3/18	0/0	15/53
Top score	167	123	31	185
Balls bowled	14,951	5,624	150	22,799
Wickets	226	169	5	350
Bowling average	32.78	24.38	32.20	31.59
5 wickets in innings	3	2	0	4
10 wickets in match	0	0	0	0
Best bowling	5/58	5/19	2/23	5/24
Catches/stumpings	52/–	47/–	5/–	185/–
Medal record
Men's Cricket
Representing England
Champions Trophy
Runner-up	2004 England
- Source: ESPNcricinfo, 23 April 2020
- Boxing career
- Height: 6 ft 4 in (1.93 m)
- Weight: Heavyweight
- Stance: Orthodox

Boxing record
- Total fights: 1
- Wins: 1
- Win by KO: 0
- Losses: 0

Andrew "Freddie" Flintoff (born 6 December 1977) is an English television and radio presenter and former international cricketer. Flintoff played all forms of the game and was one of the sport's leading all-rounders, a fast bowler, middle-order batsman and slip fielder. He was consistently rated by the ICC as being among the top international all-rounders in both ODI and Test cricket.

Following his debut in 1998, Flintoff became an integral player for England and was England's "Man of the Series" in the 2005 Ashes. He later served as both captain and vice-captain of the team. He retired from Test cricket at the end of the 2009 Ashes series and from other forms of the game in 2010. He then had one professional boxing fight on 30 November 2012 in Manchester, beating American Richard Dawson on a points decision. In 2014, Flintoff came out of retirement to play Twenty20 cricket for Lancashire, before being signed by the Brisbane Heat to play in the Australian Big Bash League for the 2014–15 season.

Since his retirement, Flintoff has been involved with numerous projects, including designing his own fashion range and becoming the face of clothing brand Jacamo, winning the first series of the Australian version of I'm a Celebrity...Get Me Out of Here! and being part of Sky One's sports-based comedy panel show A League of Their Own. Flintoff became a presenter of the BBC One car show Top Gear in 2019, remaining with the programme until he sustained injuries resulting from an accident during filming in late 2022.

== Early life ==
Flintoff was born in Preston, Lancashire, and his father, Colin, was a plumber and factory maintenance worker and the captain of Dutton Forshaw second XI cricket team. Flintoff attended Greenlands Community Primary School and Ribbleton Hall High School (subsequently renamed City of Preston High School). His first trip abroad, at age 14, was to Argentina.

During his school days he acquired the nickname "Freddie" due to his surname resembling that of the cartoon character Fred Flintstone.

At Ribbleton Hall, he passed nine GCSEs, but he did not want to stay in education and left school at 16. As a boy, he played cricket for the Lancashire Schools under-11s and under-15s teams and he was also a keen chess player. He then played for two and a half years in the England under-19 cricket team.

== Professional career ==
=== Early years: criticism, injury and fitness troubles ===
Flintoff was captain of the England Under-19 team for their tour to Pakistan in 1996/7 and at home against Zimbabwe in 1997. He made his Test match debut for England in 1998 against South Africa at Trent Bridge, in a match remembered for its second-innings duel between Mike Atherton and Allan Donald; Flintoff and Jacques Kallis exchanged wickets. Nonetheless, his struggle to make the grade at county level continued, he found form only intermittently, though often explosively when he did so.

In 2000, he scored 135 not out in the quarterfinals of the Natwest Trophy against Surrey, which David Gower described as "the most awesome innings we are ever going to see on a cricket field". In the same year England's management made clear they were unhappy with his fitness and weight, Flintoff responded to his critics with 42 not out in a one-day game against Zimbabwe on his home ground of Old Trafford, forming an explosive second-wicket stand with Graeme Hick; as he collected the Man of the Match award he remarked his performance was "not bad for a fat lad".

Although he lost his England place during 2001, he remodelled his bowling action and gained a place on the 2001–02 tour to India. Though he hit possibly his worst international batting form during the Test series, frustrating him to the point that he broke down in tears in the dressing room at one stage, he later saw the tour as a turning point in his career, specifically the crucial final one-day match. Entrusted with bowling the final over with India needing 11 to win, he ran out Anil Kumble and bowled Javagal Srinath with successive balls to win the match, taking off his shirt in celebration, which was mimicked by Sourav Ganguly in a later match.

=== Improved consistency, step-up to key international player ===
In 2002, Flintoff scored his maiden Test century against New Zealand. By 2003, a newer, fitter Flintoff started to justify the comparisons with Botham. Up to the end of 2002, he had averaged just 19 with the bat and 47 with the ball; from 2003 to the end of the 2005 Ashes series, the corresponding figures were 43 and 28. In the summer of 2003 he scored a century and three fifties in the five-Test series against South Africa at home. He continued to play well on the tour of the West Indies in March and April 2004, taking five wickets in the Test in Barbados and scoring a century in Antigua. In early 2004 he was named as a Wisden Cricketer of the Year.

Although injury prevented him from bowling, he was called into the England squad for the 2004 NatWest One Day International (ODI) Series against New Zealand and the West Indies as a specialist batsman, scoring two consecutive centuries in the series and hitting seven sixes in one innings.

He matched this haul in the Second Test against the West Indies at Edgbaston in July, hitting a first-class best figure of 167. During this innings, watched by a crowd of 20,000, Flintoff hit a six into the top tier of the Ryder Stand. A man stood to claim the catch and dropped it – it was Flintoff's father. Over the course of England's record-breaking summer, he hit a half-century in all seven victorious Tests against New Zealand and the West Indies. On returning to the one-day game as an all-rounder in September he fell agonisingly short of a third one-day century, caught on 99 against India, though he went on to hit a further century in the ICC Champions Trophy 2004 pool match against Sri Lanka two weeks later.

At the end of the season he was named as the inaugural winner of the ICC Award for one-day player of the year and the Professional Cricketers' Association player of the year. He also became a father when his fiancée Rachael Wools gave birth on 6 September. They now have a second child who was born during the series in India in 2006. Flintoff briefly returned home from the tour to see his son for the first time.

=== 2005: Ashes winner ===
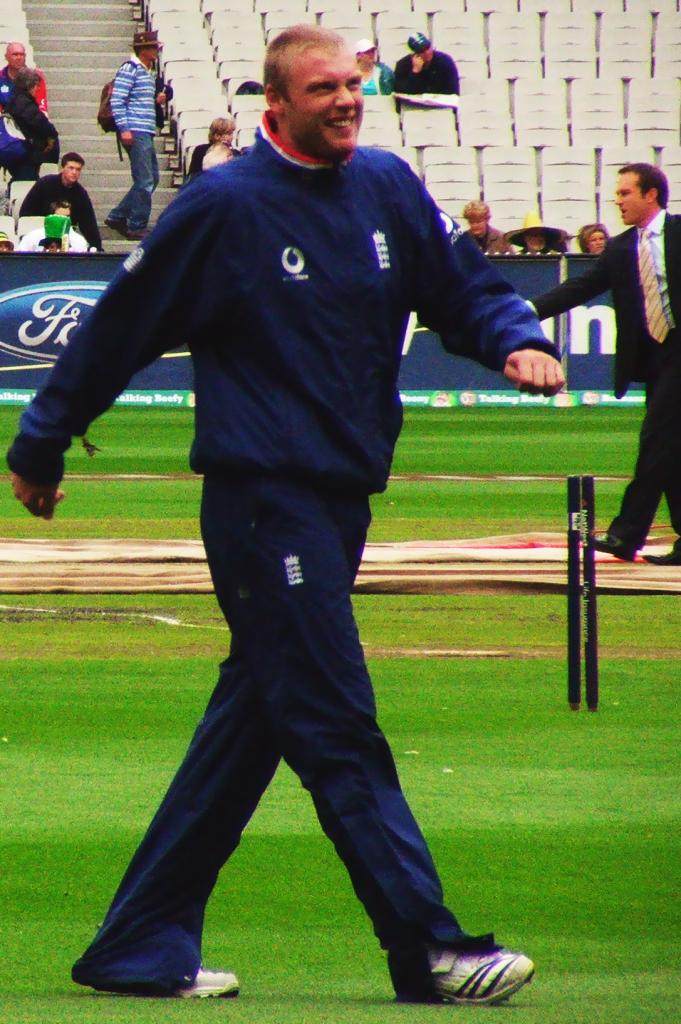
Flintoff during practice session

Following the Test series in South Africa in December 2004 and January 2005, Flintoff flew home for surgery on his left ankle, leading to worries he might not regain fitness in time for The Ashes. In fact, following a rehabilitation programme of swimming and hill-walking, he recovered ahead of schedule and was able to return to action for Lancashire in April.

In the Second Test against Australia at Edgbaston in August 2005, he broke Ian Botham's 1981 record of six sixes in an Ashes Test Match with five in the first innings and a further four in the second innings; he scored 141 runs in total. In the same game he took a total of seven wickets (across both innings), including the wickets of Langer and Ponting in his first over in Australia's run-chase. He managed all this despite a shoulder injury early in the second innings. England won the game by just two runs and saved their hopes of regaining the Ashes. Flintoff was named 'Man of the Match' and captain Michael Vaughan subsequently dubbed the match "Fred's Test" in honour of his achievement.

Flintoff scored a century during England's crucial win at Trent Bridge. He took five wickets on the fourth day of the final Test match, enabling England to go off for bad light and helping them eventually to secure a draw and regain the Ashes.

For his achievements throughout the 2005 Ashes series, he was named as "Man of the Series" by Australian coach, John Buchanan. His achievement also won him the inaugural Compton-Miller Medal. He was also awarded the Freedom of the City of Preston.

In October 2005, Flintoff shared the Sir Garfield Sobers Trophy for the ICC player of the year award with Jacques Kallis of South Africa. In December 2005, Flintoff was named BBC Sports Personality of the Year for 2005, the first cricketer since Botham in 1981. In the New Year's Honours List for 2006, Flintoff was appointed an MBE for his role in the successful Ashes team. In January 2006, Flintoff was presented with the Freedom of the City award for Preston, Lancashire. The award was presented to Flintoff by the mayor of Preston. Other recipients of the award include Sir Tom Finney and Nick Park.

=== England captaincy ===
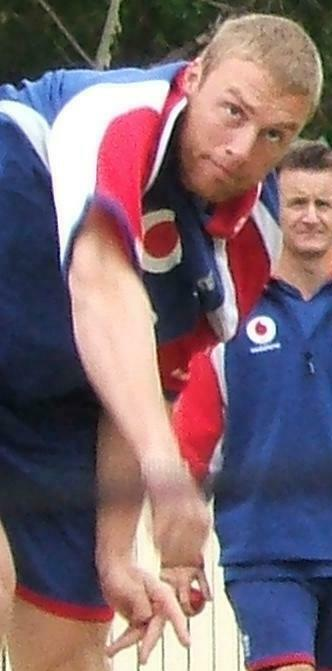
Flintoff bowls in the nets at Adelaide Oval

In February 2006 following England captain Michael Vaughan and vice-captain Marcus Trescothick becoming unavailable for the first Test match against India, Flintoff was named captain of the England team and subsequently announced that he would be staying in India for the entire Test series, although he and his wife were expecting their second child. His wife gave birth to a son, Corey, shortly before the second Test on 9 March.

On the field, Flintoff was seen as a great success during the drawn series with India, with a 212-run victory in Mumbai. His contributions with both bat and ball ensured that he was named as the player of the series, with many commentators seeing Flintoff as someone who not only worked better under the responsibility but was also viewed as a great influence of an inexperienced team, which included many debutants, such as Alastair Cook, Owais Shah and Monty Panesar. Flintoff amassed four fifties in the series and took 11 wickets, on unfriendly surfaces for seamers. Flintoff continued to captain England during the seven ODIs in India, although he was rested for two matches. Sri Lanka toured in May and England drew the three-Test series 1–1. The series took a heavy toll on Flintoff physically as journalist David Hopps remarked:

By the end of the series, Flintoff was also a crock, succumbing to a further ankle injury that put his role in the winter's Ashes in doubt. Could this be traced back to the opening Test at Lord's when, in his first serious bowl of the season, and somewhat above his fighting weight, he bowled an excessive 68.3 overs and nothing above 85mph? He had gone from shock bowler to stock bowler – under his own captaincy, too.

A recurrence of his long-term ankle problem in the Test series meant Flintoff missed both the ODI series against Sri Lanka and the first Test against Pakistan. It was later announced in July that Flintoff's rehabilitation had not been sufficient to quell the injury and that further surgery would be required. He was thus ruled out for the entire series against Pakistan. Despite injury concerns, Flintoff was later named for the ICC Champions Trophy, where he played as a specialist batsman, not as an all-rounder.

=== 2006–07 Ashes series ===
After his previous stint as captain in the Test series against India, Flintoff returned as captain of the England team for the eagerly anticipated 2006–07 Ashes series in Australia. The series turned out to be a humiliating one for Flintoff, leading his team to five straight losses and thus losing the Ashes after having held them for the shortest time in history. In addition, he presided over England's worst ever defeat in an Ashes series, equalling the 1921 whitewash at the hands of the Warwick Armstrong-led Australian team in the wake of World War I.

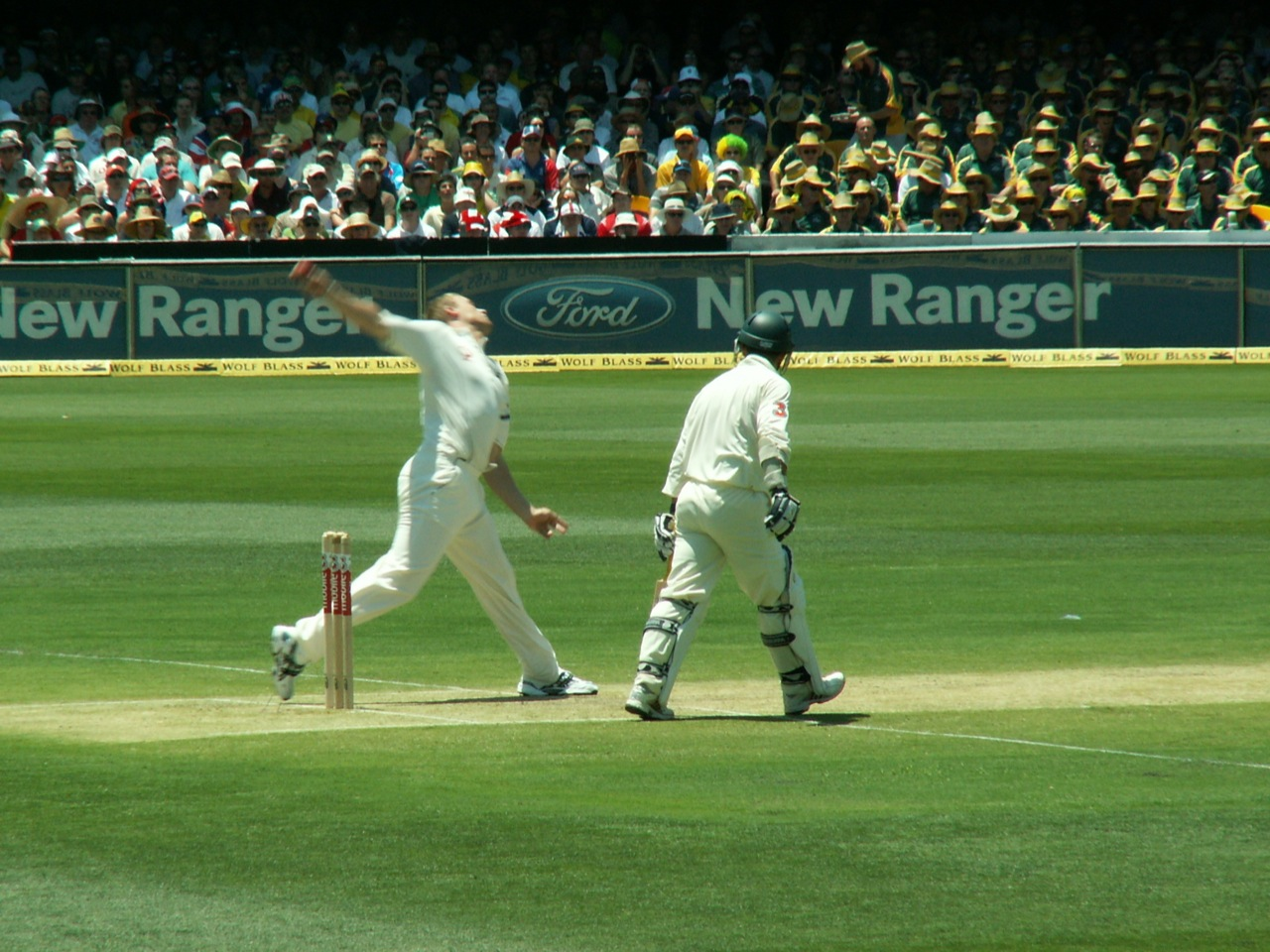
Flintoff bowling against Australia in The Ashes series

Flintoff's own play in the 2006–07 series, both bowling and at the crease, was generally deemed disappointing. He made only two scores over 50 in the series, his best bowling figures being 4–99 in the first innings of the First Test in Brisbane, and he failed to take five wickets in a match. Flintoff played in only one first-class game in the lead up to the series. He was initially undone by Australia's excellent seam bowling but his batting improved throughout the series as he got more match practice. A persistent ankle injury prevented Flintoff from bowling long spells at full pace and Australia's batsmen took advantage of this. According to Nasser Hussain during the tour he also had three or four warnings for inappropriate behaviour and binge drinking, including arriving hung over for a training session.

Flintoff also captained England for several of the subsequent 2006–07 Commonwealth Bank Series One Day International matches. Michael Vaughan's return from knee surgery was cut short by a hamstring injury and he was only able to play two matches, leaving Flintoff in charge for the remaining games. England qualified in the last game of eight group matches for the best-of-three finals against Australia, but reversed their poor form on tour with a 2–0 series win in the finals.

Flintoff contributed significantly with the ball in both matches, taking three wickets in the first match and allowing only 10 runs off five overs in the second as Australia chased a reduced total in a rain-hit match.

=== 2007 Cricket World Cup ===
With Michael Vaughan returning from injury for the Cricket World Cup in the West Indies, Flintoff was replaced as captain but appointed England's vice-captain.

In the opening match of the tournament against New Zealand, Flintoff was out first ball in England's innings and, although conceding only 17 runs in eight overs, he failed to take a wicket. He did, however, take a one-handed catch at slip to dismiss Ross Taylor for a duck. On the evening of England's defeat, Flintoff, along with some other players and coaches from the England squad, indulged in some late night drinking in a night club, only two days before their vital match against Canada. In the early hours of the morning, he reportedly had to be rescued after falling off a pedalo – this quickly became known in the media as the "Fredalo" incident. Flintoff and the others involved were reprimanded and fined, with Flintoff being stripped of the vice-captaincy. In addition, he was suspended for the match against Canada. It was revealed by England coach Duncan Fletcher that Flintoff had had a number of previous warnings about his behaviour. Flintoff has since issued a public apology and later also clarified that he didn't actually "fall off" a pedalo but rather failed in an attempt to board one.

Flintoff returned to the England team for the last group match against Kenya, taking two wickets. In the Super 8 matches, Flintoff often excelled with the ball but failed to recover his batting form. Against Ireland he took 4–43 and scored 43 runs; against Sri Lanka he took 3–35 but was out for 2 and against Australia he took 1–35 but was out for 4. In the next match against Bangladesh Flintoff took 1–38 in eight overs and scored 23 runs off 21 balls. Ultimately, he failed to influence an ailing English team and had a poor tournament. Michael Vaughan later commented that Flintoff's pedalo antics had adversely affected team morale.

=== 2007–2009: Injuries, comeback and retirement ===
Flintoff returned for a couple of games with Lancashire, in preparation for the West Indies tour of England but he re-injured his ankle and was ruled out for the first Test which started on 17 May 2007. Having undergone another operation on the troublesome ankle, he missed the whole Test and one-day series against the West Indies, and he was also ruled out for the subsequent Test series with India. Following several games for Lancashire, Flintoff returned for England in the first of seven ODIs against India on 21 August 2007. He bowled seven overs and ended with figures of one for twelve in England's 104-run victory. He hit an eventful nine runs during the second ODI; however, while fielding, he injured his knee and sat out England's 42-run victory in the third ODI. He returned for the fourth ODI on 30 August. Flintoff missed England's two narrow defeats to India in the fifth and sixth ODIs before taking 3–45 in the seventh, helping England to win the series four-three with a seven-wicket victory.

Flintoff's ankle injury recurred during the end of the 2007 season. Although he played in the 2007 ICC World Twenty20, he did not accompany the England squad to Sri Lanka, while a fourth operation made it highly unlikely that he would play again before the summer of 2008 and would miss both the Sri Lankan Test Series and the 2008 tour of New Zealand. Flintoff remained "upbeat" about his career, however.

Flintoff was back in action for Lancashire early in the 2008 season, but a side strain ruled him out of contention for the home series against New Zealand. After again returning to action in county cricket he was recalled to the England squad for the second Test against South Africa, where he missed the last 17 Tests prior. He took his 200th Test wicket in the Third Test, trapping Neil McKenzie lbw for 72. Flintoff bowled consistently against the South Africans, but South African coach Mickey Arthur felt that he was too defensive. His batting also began to show promise as he consistently made starts, before being moved back up to bat at six when Kevin Pietersen took over as captain. In the following one day series, Flintoff was an important player for England, leading Pietersen to describe him as "a superstar". Flintoff scored 78 in both the first and the third matches – he was not required to bat in the second – as well as 31 not out off 12 balls in the fourth, whilst taking three wickets in the same match. This led many pundits to speculate that Flintoff might just be back to his best. He won Man of the Series in the ODI home series against South Africa, where England won four-nil: the last match was washed out. He was both the top run-scorer and the top wicket-taker of that series. Still, though, his want of consistency frustrated the pundits. "Flintoff," wrote Peter Roebuck some time later, "is a fine cricketer who has never quite worked out how he takes wickets or scores runs. Torn between hitting and playing, pounding and probing, he has performed below his highest capabilities."

On England's tour of India, Flintoff started the series well. In the first warm-up match against the Mumbai Cricket Association, he scored exactly 100. It was his first century for England since the Fourth Test of the 2005 Ashes. His batting did not follow with similar successes in India and the West Indies, but his bowling remained strong, with a dozen wickets in the Caribbean at under 30 apiece, followed by a hat-trick in the final ODI series, becoming only the third English bowler ever to do so.

In February 2009, the Chennai Super Kings of the Indian Premier League bought Flintoff for US$1,550,000; US$600,000 above his base price of US$950,000. This made him the highest-ever-paid IPL player at the time, alongside compatriot Kevin Pietersen, surpassing Mahendra Singh Dhoni's US$1,500,000. But Flintoff did not find success at the tournament, held in South Africa due to the Indian General Elections, as after a difficult first few matches he was sent home for surgery following another knee injury.

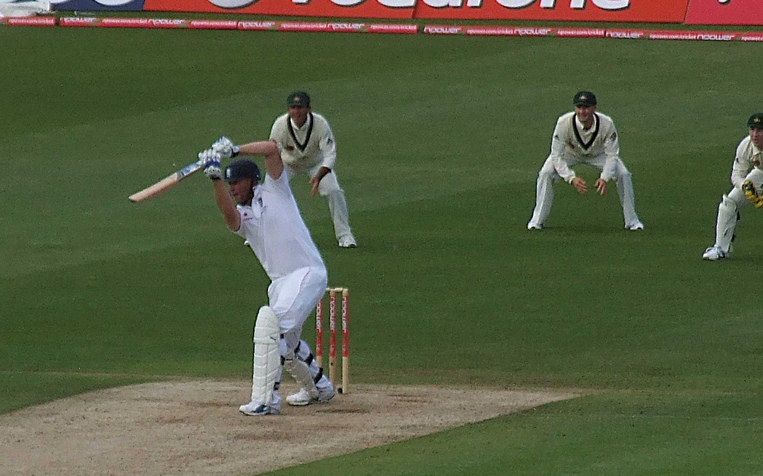
Flintoff driving through the covers at the SWALEC Stadium during the first Ashes Test of the 2009 series

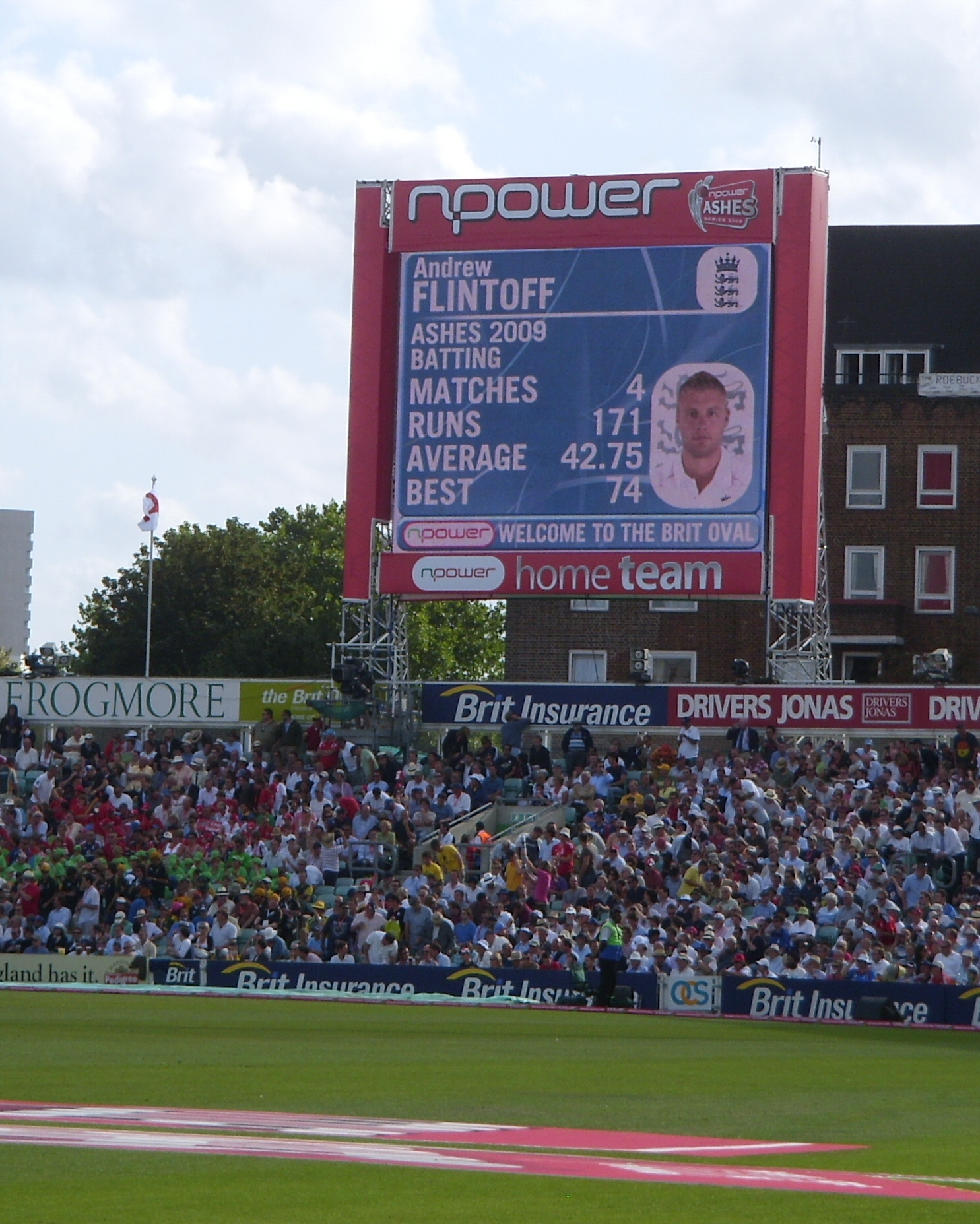
The screen display at The Oval as Flintoff comes to the wicket for his penultimate Test innings

However, speculation over Flintoff's form ahead of the much-awaited 2009 Ashes series died down as he took six wickets in his first match back for Lancashire and left "several county batsmen...nursing bruised ribs and fingers". He also collected a half-century against Hampshire, although he was still yet to register a century in either domestic cricket or any form of the international game since that Trent Bridge instalment of the last home Ashes in 2005, which year also accounted for his most recent Test five-for. "It's always been an Australian trait to over-rate players who have done well against them (just ask VVS Laxman)," wrote Lawrence Booth. "But in the case of Andrew Flintoff, this phenomenon is getting so out of control you wonder whether Steve Waugh has returned to orchestrate a cunning mind-game. ... In any case, does anyone honestly think a player with his fitness record will make it through a five-Test series condensed into less than seven weeks?" Flintoff did offer some hope with the willow in the Twenty20 Cup, however, hitting 93 off 41 balls for Lancashire against Derbyshire in June.

On 15 July 2009, Flintoff announced he would retire from Test cricket at the end of the 2009 Ashes Series. He said that "Since 2005 I have just been plagued with injury so I've got the opportunity now to finish on a high by helping England to win the Ashes and it will give me great pleasure if I can play my last Test at the Oval and we can win the Ashes – it doesn't get any bigger than that." He was man of the match in England's victory at Lords in the Second Test Match, taking 5 wickets in the second innings after a fine display of fast bowling and achieving the rare feat of making both Lord's Honours Boards. On 23 August 2009, England defeated Australia at The Oval to seal a 2–1 series win, with Flintoff notably running out the Australian captain Ricky Ponting, ensuring Flintoff ended his England career on a high.

On 16 September 2010, Flintoff retired from all forms of professional cricket, having consulted medical advisers. He continued to play recreationally for Penwortham Cricket Club alongside his brother Chris Flintoff.

=== 2014–2015: Twenty20 comeback and second retirement ===
Flintoff came out of retirement in May 2014, returning to Lancashire to play Twenty20 only. He featured in the final of the competition, dismissing Ian Bell with the ball and hitting two sixes in the penultimate over as Lancashire fell just short against Birmingham Bears. After this season he was signed by the Brisbane Heat in the Australian Big Bash League for the 2014–15 season. Flintoff disappointed on the field, ending the season, which proved to be his last as a player, with a high score of 46, with only one other score in double figures (15), along with three wickets at an average of 45.33.

=== 2024–present: Coaching ===
In September 2024, Flintoff was announced as the new head coach of the England Lions cricket team for upcoming tours to South Africa, Australia and home matches against India A cricket team and Zimbabwe.

He was appointed as Head Coach of Northern Superchargers men's team in The Hundred in 2023. He left the role in October 2025, citing issues with the salary he was offered.

Flintoff was appointed senior coach of the Sydney Thunder in the Big Bash League for the 2026-27 season.

In August 2026, he ended his time with the England Lions cricket team.

== Records and achievements ==
As of November 2024

- Flintoff is the sixth-highest wicket-taker for England in one-day international cricket with 168 wickets, and the 14th highest in Test cricket, with 219 wickets.
- Flintoff was Lancashire's winner of the NBC Denis Compton Award in 1997.
- Flintoff holds third place in the list of most sixes scored for England in Test cricket, with 78, behind Ben Stokes and Kevin Pietersen.
- Flintoff was the seventh player to have batted on all five days of a Test match, achieving this feat at Mohali, in the same match he over took in which he broke the sixes record.
- He is one of only eleven players to be on both the batting and bowling honours boards at Lord's.

== Media career ==
In March 2010, Flintoff became a team captain on the Sky One television sports panel show A League of Their Own, hosted by James Corden. In December 2010, Flintoff became a guest commentator during a number of matches in the 2011 PDC World Darts Championship event. He returned to commentary during the 2012 World Matchplay, when he called Michael van Gerwen's nine dart finish against Steve Beaton. He also hosted a radio show on BBC Radio 5 Live on Monday nights.

As of 2011 Flintoff was named as a brand ambassador for big men's fashion brand Jacamo and had his own range produced in 2012. In early 2011 he also became the face of Morrisons supermarkets.

Flintoff also produced a documentary entitled Freddie Flintoff: Hidden Side of Sport, about his and other sports stars' suffering of clinical depression. This was first aired on BBC1 on Wednesday, 11 January 2012.

Flintoff was a judge on the ITV talent show Let's Get Gold in 2012.

In 2014, Flintoff made a cameo appearance in Sky TV series, Trollied. In the same year, he also appeared as a contestant on Celebrity Deal or No Deal.

On 15 February 2015, Flintoff entered the first Australian series of I'm a Celebrity...Get Me Out of Here!, held in the Kruger National Park in South Africa. Entering on Day 17 of the series, he was crowned "King of the Jungle" after winning the series on 15 March 2015 after spending 29 days in the jungle. He was also a commentator for Network Ten's Big Bash League coverage and appeared as a regular panellist on their current affairs show The Project.

In 2014, Flintoff started the Sky One TV series Flintoff: Lord of the Fries, touring around the UK exploring the places, people and food with co-host Rob Penn. The series was aired from 2015, the second series (2016) was titled "Freddie Fries again". In December 2016, Flintoff and Penn took the series to Australia titled "Freddie Fries Down Under" AKA "Freddie Down Under" with challenges along the way.

Along with close friend and former Blackburn Rovers captain Robbie Savage and journalist and former table tennis professional Matthew Syed, Flintoff hosted a BBC Radio 5 Live podcast called Flintoff, Savage & The Ping Pong Guy in which hot sporting topics are discussed. The podcast won two categories at the 2017 Radio Academy Awards – Best Podcast and Best New Show – and Flintoff himself was awarded the Best New Presenter category.

Flintoff was a co-host for Australian Ninja Warrior, which first aired on the Nine Network in July 2017. Currently on its fourth season, he had to leave after the quarter finals due to the COVID-19 pandemic.

In September 2017, Flintoff was the main presenter for Cannonball on ITV with Frankie Bridge, Radzi Chinyanganya, Ryan Hand and Maya Jama as poolside reporters.

He appeared in the BBC drama Love, Lies & Records. In November 2017, Flintoff made his musical theatre debut as Kevin Mergatroyd in Kay Mellor's Fat Friends The Musical (based on the ITV series) in Leeds before touring the UK in early 2018. He also hosted All Star Musicals for ITV in December 2017.

In October 2018, it was announced that Flintoff would be the new host of Top Gear alongside Paddy McGuinness and Chris Harris. Filming for the 27th series of the BBC Two show began in early 2019 and first aired in June 2019. On 11 February 2019, it was reported that Flintoff had crashed into a market stall in Mansfield while filming for the show.

On 10 September 2019 Flintoff crashed a second time, while riding a head-first trike at 124 mph during one of the car show's signature competitions. He was not injured and resumed filming afterwards.

Flintoff was involved in a third crash when filming on 13 December 2022, at the Dunsfold Park Aerodrome, after which he was airlifted to hospital; racing driver Paul Rees, who portrayed the anonymous character the Stig on the show, was a passenger in the vehicle and was also left seriously injured. In October 2023, press reports confirmed that BBC Studios had reached a £9 million financial settlement to compensate Flintoff for the injuries he had sustained.

In 2022, Flintoff presented Freddie's Field of Dreams on the BBC which saw him attempting to create a cricket team made up of disadvantaged boys from Preston. A second series was released in 2024 with Flintoff taking the team on tour to India.

== Property ==
In 2018, it was reported that he was involved in a development to build a new tower block in Castlefield, along Mancunian Way. The two buildings were dubbed the "Flintoff towers". After the original was rejected for being too tall, in June 2019 Flintoff continued seeking permission for a 23-storey residential tower in Castlefield, Manchester, A shorter version was approved in July 2019, with the tower designed by SimpsonHaugh. The new development will be 23 storeys, not 35.

== Personal life ==
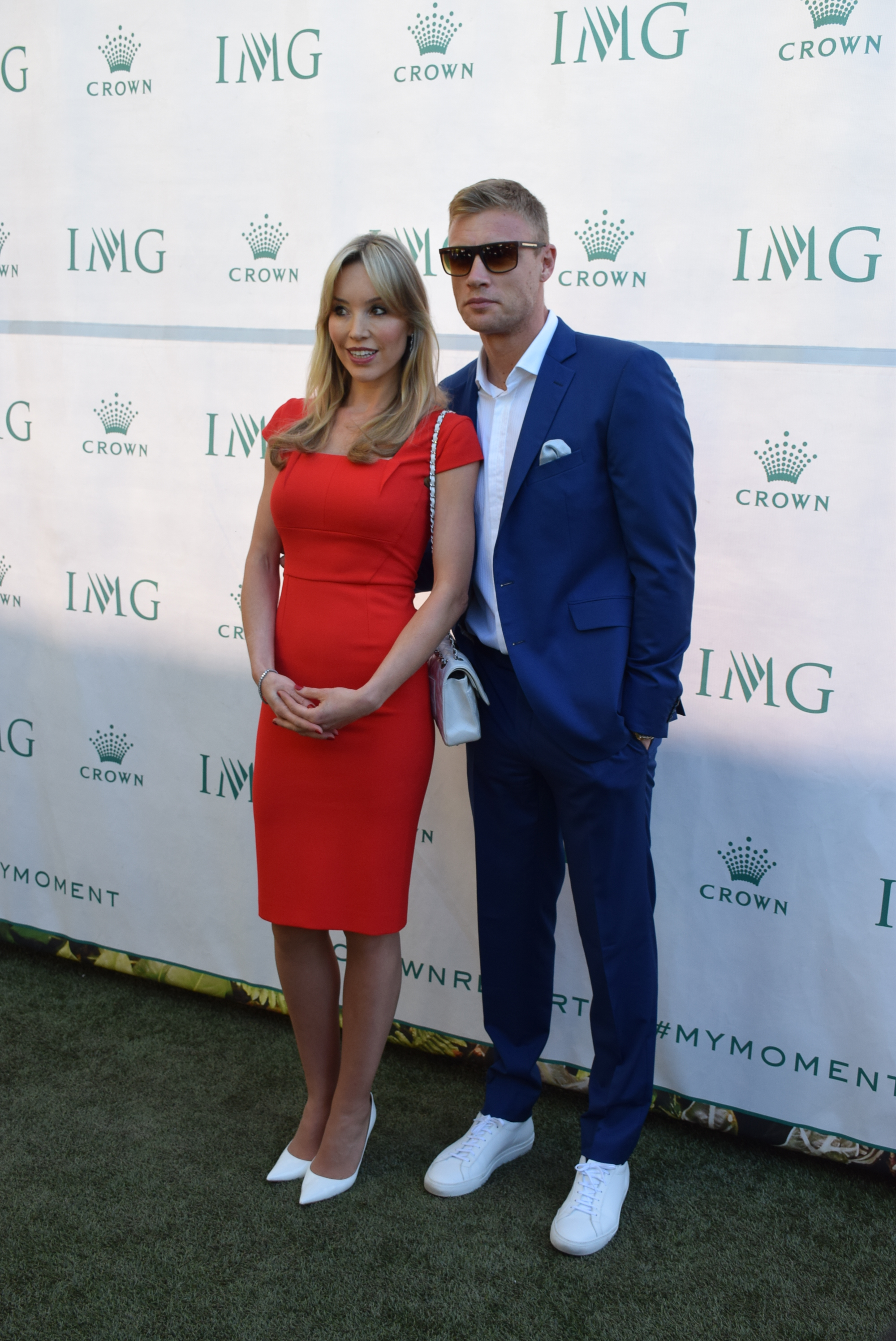
Flintoff with his wife Rachael in 2016.

Flintoff married Rachael Wools in March 2005 at Knightsbridge, London. He has four children, including Rocky and Corey who are also cricketers.

Flintoff is a supporter of Preston North End. In his 2005 autobiography, Being Freddie, Flintoff admitted he had little or no interest in football at the time and only visited the City of Manchester Stadium for the social atmosphere.

Flintoff's father, Colin, and his brother, Chris, both played cricket, with Colin still playing for Whittingham Cricket Club near Preston.

On 20 January 2006, Flintoff was awarded the Honorary Freedom of Preston, his home town. In 2011, Flintoff was awarded an Honorary Fellowship of Preston-based Myerscough College.

=== Autobiographies ===
Flintoff has written several books:

- Being Freddie
- Freddie
- Andrew Flintoff, My Life in Pictures
- Ashes to Ashes
- Good Times, Bad Times
- Right, Said Fred

=== Documentaries ===
His career has been subject of a number of TV films and documentaries. In Freddie Flintoff: Hidden Side of Sport broadcast on the BBC One in 2012, he talks candidly in interviews with Steve Harmison, Vinnie Jones and Ricky Hatton and others about the serious effects of depression.

In the documentary Flintoff: From Lord's to the Ring in 2012 broadcast on Sky 1, the cricket champion is followed in a 3-episode series while pursuing a possible career as a professional boxer under the guidance of trainers Barry McGuigan and his son Shane McGuigan.

In 2020, Flintoff presented a documentary that aired on BBC One called Freddie Flintoff: Living With Bulimia. In the documentary, Flintoff talks with other men who have suffered with bulimia and discusses the stigma around men who suffer with eating disorders. Flintoff has suffered with bulimia since he was 20 years old. At the end of the documentary, Flintoff said that he would like to seek treatment for his eating disorder.

== Filmography ==
Year	Title	Role	Notes
2005	The Frank Skinner Show	Guest	1 episode
2005	Strictly Come Dancing	Guest	4 episodes
2006	Match of the Day	Guest	1 episode
2007	ITV News	Guest	1 episode
2007	You Can't Fire Me, I'm Famous	Participant	1 episode
2007	Friday Night with Jonathan Ross	Guest	1 episode
2009, 2012, 2017–2019	The One Show	Guest	7 episodes
2009	The F Word	Guest	1 episode
2010	Live from Studio Five	Guest	1 episode
2010–present	A League of Their Own	Participant	113 episodes
2010	2010 Sport Relief	Himself	One-off
2010	James Corden's World Cup Live	Guest	1 episode
2011	Daybreak	Guest	1 episode
2011	The Million Pound Drop	Participant	1 episode
2011	John Bishop's Britain	Himself	5 episodes
2011	My Funniest Year	Himself	1 episode
2011	Alone in the Wild: Freddie Flintoff	Himself	Television movie
2012	Celebrity Juice	Guest	3 episodes
2012, 2015	The Jonathan Ross Show	Guest	2 episodes
2012, 2017–2018	Loose Women	Guest	6 episodes
2012	Freddie Flintoff Goes Wild	Himself	4 episodes
2012	Let's Get Gold	Himself	1 episode
2012	The Last Leg	Guest	1 episode
2012	Flintoff: From Lord's to the Ring	Himself	4 episodes
2013	John Bishop's Only Joking	Guest	3 episodes
2013	The Graham Norton Show	Guest	1 episode
2013	That Puppet Game Show	Participant	1 episode
2013–2014	8 Out of 10 Cats	Guest	2 episodes
2013	The Spa	Himself	1 episode
2014	Piers Morgan's Life Stories	Guest	1 episode
2014	Celebrity Squares	Participant	1 episode
2014	Duck Quacks Don't Echo	Participant	1 episode
2014	Sunday Brunch	Guest	1 episode
2014	Oxford Street Revealed	Himself	1 episode
2014	Trollied	Himself	1 episode
2014–2015	8 Out of 10 Cats Does Countdown	Participant	2 episodes
2015	I'm A Celebrity.. Get Me Out of Here!	Participant	20 episodes
2015	The New Paul O'Grady Show	Guest	1 episode
2015	Very British Problems	Himself	3 episodes
2015	Special Forces: Ultimate Hell Week	Presenter	3 episodes
2015–present	Flintoff: Lord of the Fries	Himself	14 episodes (plus 4 in production)
2016	Too Much TV	Presenter	1 episode
2016	All Star Mr & Mrs	Participant	1 episode
2016	John Bishop: in Conversation With	Guest	1 episode
2016	Tipping Point: Lucky Stars	Participant	1 episode
2017	Freddie Down Under	Himself	6 episodes
2017	Parenting for Idiots	Participant	3 episodes
2017	Ant & Dec's Saturday Night Takeaway	Guest	1 episode
2017	The Nightly Show	Guest	1 episode
2017–2018	Good Morning Britain	Guest	2 episodes
2017	Andrew Flintoff's Summer: Pacino and Bert	Man	Television movie
2017–2020	Australian Ninja Warrior	Presenter	21 episodes
2017	Cannonball	Presenter	10 episodes
2017	Gogglebox	Participant	1 episode
2017	Love, Lies and Records	Danny	1 episode
2018	Breakfast	Guest	1 episode
2018	All Round to Mrs. Brown's	Guest	1 episode
2018	Carnage	Presenter	
2019	Cricket World Cup Opening Ceremony	Presenter	One-off
2019	Lorraine	Guest	1 episode
2019–2022	Top Gear	Presenter	7 series (38 episodes)
2020	Total Wipeout – Freddie and Paddy's Takeover	Presenter	
2020	Don't Rock The Boat	Presenter	
2020	Freddie Flintoff: Living with Bulimia	Presenter	
2021	DNA Journey	Himself	1 episode; 10 March 2021
2022	The Games	Himself	1 series (5 episodes)
2022–2025	Freddie Flintoff's Field of Dreams	Himself	Documentary series; three series aired
2022	Freddie & Jason: Two Men in a Tent	Himself	With Jason Manford
2024–present	Bullseye	Presenter	
2025	Flintoff	Himself	Documentary

== Awards and honours ==
- Sir Garfield Sobers Trophy (ICC Cricketer of the Year): 2005
- Honorary Freedom of Preston: 2006
- Honorary Fellowship of Myerscough College: 2011
- England captain: 2006, 2006–2007
- Wisden Leading Cricketer in the World: 2005
- Wisden Cricketers of the Year: 2004
- PCA Player of the Year: 2004, 2005
- ICC ODI Player of the Year: 2004
- ICC World One-Day XI: 2004, 2005, 2006
- ICC World Test XI: 2005, 2006
- Cricket Writers' Club Young Cricketer of the Year: 1998
- Compton-Miller medal: 2005
- BBC Sports Personality of the Year: 2005
- BBC Sports Personality of the Year Third Place: 2004
- NBC Denis Compton Award: 1997
- Walter Lawrence Trophy: 1999
- MCC Spirit of Cricket Award: 2005

== Professional boxing record ==
1 fight	1 win	0 losses
By decision	1	0

No.	Result	Record	Opponent	Type	Round, time	Date	Location	Notes
1	Win	1–0	Richard Dawson	PTS	4	30 November 2012	Manchester Arena, Manchester, England	

Sporting positions
Preceded by Michael Vaughan Andrew Strauss	English national cricket captain 2006 deputising for Michael Vaughan; 2006–2007 deputising for Michael Vaughan	Succeeded by Andrew Strauss Michael Vaughan
Awards and achievements
Preceded by Shane Warne	Wisden Leading Cricketer in the World; 2006	Succeeded by Muttiah Muralitharan
Preceded by Dave Spikey	Host of Bullseye; 2024–	Succeeded by
