= Ollie Sutton =

English cricketer (born 2000)

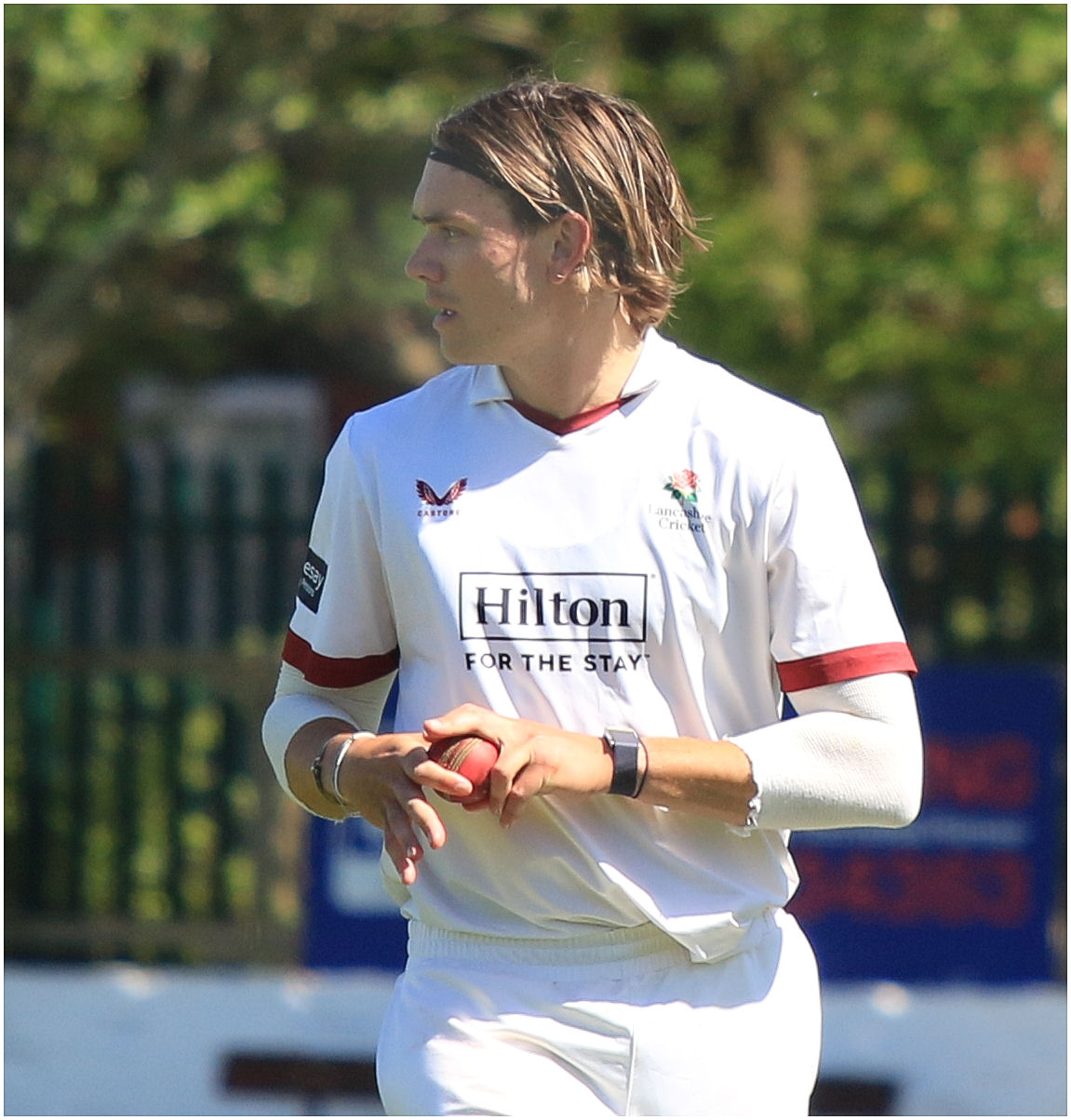
- Sutton in 2026

Personal information
- Full name: Oliver William Sutton
- Born: 25 January 2000 (age 26); Sefton, Merseyside, England
- Batting: Left-handed
- Bowling: Left-arm medium fast
- Role: Bowler

Domestic team information
- Years: Team
- 2024–present: Lancashire (squad no. 22)
- FC debut: 4 April 2025 Lancashire v Middlesex
- LA debut: 28 July 2024 Lancashire v Kent

Career statistics
Competition	FC	LA
Matches	2	6
Runs scored	21	34
Batting average	21.00	11.33
100s/50s	0/0	0/0
Top score	19	17*
Balls bowled	198	165
Wickets	3	2
Bowling average	52.66	103.00
5 wickets in innings	0	0
10 wickets in match	0	0
Best bowling	2/57	1/1
Catches/stumpings	0/–	1/–
- Source: ESPNcricinfo, 15 August 2026

Oliver William Sutton (born 25 January 2000) is an English cricketer who plays for Lancashire County Cricket Club. He is a left handed batsman and left arm medium fast bowler.

== Career ==
From Sefton, Merseyside, he played club cricket for Formby CC. He signed a short-term contract with Lancashire County Cricket Club in the summer of 2024. He made his List A debut for Lancashire on 28 July against Kent, and took a wicket with his first legal ball in professional cricket, dismissing Ekansh Singh, unfortunately however, he suffered a side strain shortly afterwards and was unable to complete bowling his opening over. He signed a professional contract with the county in October 2024 after completing a period of rehabilitation with the county.

He made his first-class debut for Lancashire on 4 April 2025 against Middlesex at Lords. He took three wickets on his first-class debut. On 17 April 2026, Sutton was called-up as a like-for-like substitute during Lancashire's first-class match against Gloucestershire, following an injury to Ajeet Singh Dale. Sutton was playing a second-XI match in Leicester at the time, and was required to make a 120-mile mid-match journey.
