= Dominic Kelly (cricketer) =

English cricketer

Dom Kelly
Personal information
- Full name: Dominic Christopher Kelly
- Born: 1 October 2005 (age 21); Winchester, Hampshire, England
- Batting: Left-handed
- Bowling: Right-arm medium
- Role: Bowler

Domestic team information
- Years: Team
- 2022–2026: Hampshire
- First-class debut: 13 May 2022 Hampshire v SLC Development XI
- List A debut: 14 August 2022 Hampshire v Lancashire

Career statistics
Competition	First-class	List A
Matches	2	20
Runs scored	12	214
Batting average	–	17.83
100s/50s	0/0	0/0
Top score	12*	45
Balls bowled	295	675
Wickets	4	20
Bowling average	44.25	33.75
5 wickets in innings	0	1
10 wickets in match	0	0
Best bowling	2/22	5/19
Catches/stumpings	1/–	10/–
- Source: CricInfo, 12 August 2026

Dominic Christopher Kelly (born 1 October 2005) is an English cricketer who has played for Hampshire County Cricket Club and the England under-19 cricket team. He is a left-handed batter and right arm medium pace bowler.

== Early life ==
From Winchester in Hampshire, he attended school at Millfield in Somerset.

== Career ==
Kelly made his List-A cricket debut for Hampshire as a 16 year-old, at the Ageas Bowl against Lancashire County Cricket Club on 14 August 2022. He made several appearances for Hampshire in the 2023 One-Day Cup. He recorded 2/22 against Yorkshire on 17 August 2023.

== International career ==
Playing for England under-19 cricket team against Australia under-19s in January 2023, Kelly took 5-69 and won man of the match in their opening four-day game of a multi format series. In December 2023, he was selected for the England team for the U19 Cricket World Cup.
