= One-Day Cup (England) =

English professional cricket competition

- Countries: England; Wales
- Administrator: England and Wales Cricket Board
- Format: Limited overs cricket
- First edition: 2014
- Latest edition: 2026
- Next edition: 2027
- Tournament format: Group stage and knockout
- Number of teams: 18
- Current champion: Middlesex (2nd title)
- Most successful: Kent (6 titles)

The One-Day Cup, currently known as the Metro Bank One Day Cup, is a fifty-over limited overs cricket competition for the England and Wales first-class counties. It began in 2014 as a replacement for the ECB 40 tournament, which ran from 2010 to 2013. In contrast to its 40-over predecessor, the number of overs per innings was set at 50 to bring the competition in line with One-Day Internationals.

The 2020 tournament was cancelled due to the COVID-19 pandemic.

== Format ==
The competition begins with a round-robin tournament featuring two groups of nine. The groups were organised geographically with a North group and a South group until 2021, since then the groups have been decided by a draw.

As of 2024, the top three teams in each group progress to the knock-out stage of the competition. The final was held at Lord's until 2020, when it was moved to Trent Bridge.

== Teams ==
=== Stadiums and locations ===
Locations of current One day Cup teams
County Championship clubs in Greater London

County Club	Home Ground	First appearance	No. of titles
Derbyshire	Racecourse Ground		
Durham	Riverside Ground		
Essex	County Ground		
Glamorgan	Sophia Gardens		
Gloucestershire	Nevil Road		
Hampshire	Rose Bowl		
Kent	St Lawrence Ground		
Lancashire	Old Trafford		
Leicestershire	Grace Road		
Middlesex	Lord's		
Northamptonshire	Wantage Road		
Nottinghamshire	Trent Bridge		
Somerset	County Ground		
Surrey	The Oval		
Sussex	County Ground		
Warwickshire	Edgbaston		
Worcestershire	New Road		
Yorkshire	Headingley		

== Predecessors ==
The One-Day Cup is the latest in a line of limited over competitions in county cricket. It has been title-sponsored by Royal London and Metro Bank.

=== Sunday League ===
The "John Player League" was launched in 1969, as the second one-day competition in England and Wales alongside the Gillette Cup (launched in 1963). The 17 counties of the time played each other in a league format on Sunday afternoons throughout the season. These matches were concise enough to be shown on television, with BBC2 broadcasting one match each week in full until the 1980s, and then as part of the Sunday Grandstand multi-sport programme. For close finishes for the title, cameras appeared at the grounds where the contenders for the title were competing and the trophy presentation to the victorious team would be on film.

Refuge Assurance replaced John Player as the sponsor of the competition in 1987 and then in 1988 started an end-of-season play-off competition known as the Refuge Assurance Cup. The top four teams of the season qualified for this competition, with the first-placed team playing the fourth and the second-placed team playing the third, and the winners of these matches meeting in a final at a neutral venue. This competition lasted until 1991.

On Friday 5 July 1991, Somerset played Lancashire at Taunton in the first Sunday League match not to be played on a Sunday.

The Sunday League was not sponsored in 1992, the year Durham made its debut, but in 1993 AXA Equity and Law became the sponsor. The matches this season were 50 overs per innings. The first round of matches that took place on 9 May 1993 were the first official matches in England and Wales to be played in coloured clothing and with a white ball. The following season the competition reverted to 40 overs per innings. On Wednesday 23 July 1997 Warwickshire played Somerset at Edgbaston in the first competitive county game to be played under floodlights.

=== National League ===
The National League was launched in 1999 with the 18 first-class counties split into two divisions with three teams promoted and relegated between the two divisions. The matches were played over 45 overs and the competition was sponsored by Norwich Union. Matches were spread over the week rather than Sundays only.

The counties incorporated nicknames into their official names for the National League. For example, Kent became the 'Spitfires', Middlesex the 'Crusaders' and Lancashire the 'Lightning'. Starting the following season the Scotland Saltires took part in the League until 2005.

In 2006, the National League was renamed the "NatWest Pro40" and was played in the later part of the season with the teams playing each other once. Also, two teams instead of three were promoted to the first division and two relegated to the second division. A third promotion/relegation spot is determined in a play-off game between the team third from top in the second division and third from bottom team in the first. The format continued until 2009.

=== ECB40 ===
The ECB40, known variously as the "Clydesdale Bank 40" and "Yorkshire Bank 40 (YB40)", was a forty-over limited overs cricket competition for the English and Welsh first-class counties. It began in the 2010 English and Welsh cricket season, incorporating the league element of the Pro40 and the knockout stages of the Friends Provident Trophy, itself a successor to the Gillette Cup.

Ireland and Scotland were asked to compete, following their entry in the Friends Provident Trophy, but Ireland declined in order to concentrate on their growing international commitments; The Netherlands took their place. A new team, the Unicorns cricket team, was formed of uncontracted county players competing unpaid, bringing the number of teams to 21. These three extra teams would not go on to feature in the Royal London One-Day Cup.

== Winners ==
Season	Winner	Runner-up
2014	Durham	Warwickshire
2015	Gloucestershire	Surrey
2016	Warwickshire	Surrey
2017	Nottinghamshire	Surrey
2018	Hampshire	Kent
2019	Somerset	Hampshire
2020	Cancelled (Note: The 2020 season was severely disrupted due to the COVID-19 pandemic. Having already agreed to start the season in August, on 7 July 2020, the majority of counties voted to play first-class and Twenty20 cricket, with the Royal London One-Day Cup being cancelled.)	
2021	Glamorgan	Durham
2022	Kent	Lancashire
2023	Leicestershire	Hampshire
2024	Glamorgan	Somerset
2025	Worcestershire	Hampshire
2026	Middlesex	Leicestershire

== Sponsors ==
- 2013–2022 Royal London
- 2023–present Metro Bank

== See also ==
- T20 Blast
- County Championship
- The Hundred
