= 2025 The Hundred season =

Fifth season of The Hundred

- Dates: 5 – 31 August 2025
- Administrator: England and Wales Cricket Board
- Cricket format: 100-ball cricket
- Tournament format(s): Group stage and knockout
- Champions: W: Northern Superchargers (1st title); M: Oval Invincibles (3rd title)
- Participants: W: 8 M: 8
- Matches: 68; W: 34; M: 34
- Player of the series: W: Phoebe Litchfield (Northern Superchargers); M: Jordan Cox (Oval Invincibles)
- Most runs: W: Phoebe Litchfield (Northern Superchargers) (292); M: Jordan Cox (Oval Invincibles) (367)
- Most wickets: W: Lauren Bell (Southern Brave) (19); M: Josh Tongue (Manchester Originals) (14)
- Official website: The Hundred

The 2025 The Hundred season was the fifth season of The Hundred, a professional franchise 100-ball cricket tournament involving eight men's and women's teams located in major cities across United Kingdom.

The women's tournament was won for the first time by the Northern Superchargers, while the men's Oval Invincibles won their third consecutive title.

== Teams and venues ==
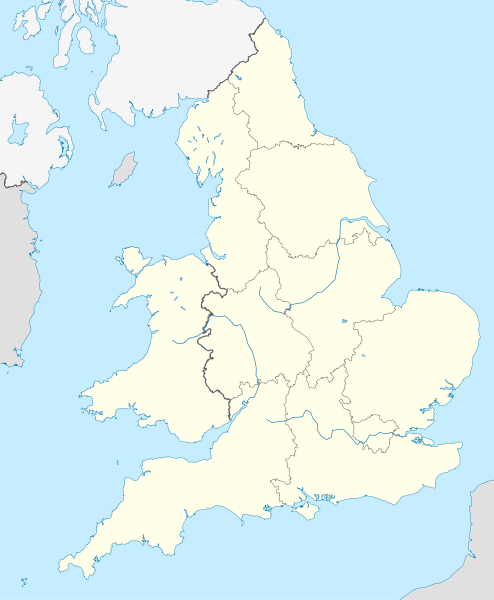
Venues in England and Wales

The eight teams that competed in the 2024 season returned for the fifth year. They are all franchises, which operated separately from the existing county cricket clubs, with each representing large areas of England and Wales.

Team	Venue	Men's coach	Women's coach
Birmingham Phoenix	Edgbaston, Birmingham	Daniel Vettori	Ali Maiden
London Spirit	Lord's, London	Justin Langer	Chris Liddle
Manchester Originals	Old Trafford, Manchester	Simon Katich	Michael Klinger
Northern Superchargers	Headingley, Leeds	Andrew Flintoff	Lisa Keightley
Oval Invincibles	The Oval, London	Tom Moody	Jonathan Batty
Southern Brave	Rose Bowl, Southampton	Adrian Birrell	Luke Williams
Trent Rockets	Trent Bridge, Nottingham	Andy Flower	Jon Lewis
Welsh Fire (Welsh: Tân Cymreig)	Sophia Gardens, Cardiff	Mike Hussey	Gareth Breese

== Background ==
=== Competition Format ===
As in previous editions, eight city-based teams competed for the men's and women's titles during August 2025, from the 5th to the 31st.

The teams played a total of 64 matches in the group stage (32 men's, 32 women's). All matches were held on the same day at the same grounds, with one ticket granting access to both men's and women's contests.

Each team played four matches at home and four away, including one match against every other side in the competition and a bonus match against their nearest regional rivals.

=== Knockout Stage ===
After the league stage, the top three teams progressed to the knockout stage to decide the champions. The second- and third-placed teams faced each other in the eliminator at The Oval in London. The winner of the eliminator then met the league-topping team in the final at Lord's.

Eliminator	Final
	First-placed team
Second-placed team	Winner of Eliminator
Third-placed team

== Draft ==
=== Women ===
Team captains are in bold.

Price	Birmingham Phoenix	London Spirit	Manchester Originals	Northern Superchargers	Oval Invincibles	Southern Brave	Trent Rockets	Welsh Fire
£65k	Georgia Voll	Heather Knight	Sophie Ecclestone	Annabel Sutherland	Paige Scholfield	Danni Wyatt-Hodge	Nat Sciver-Brunt	Sophia Dunkley
£65k	**Ellyse Perry**	Grace Harris	Melie Kerr	Phoebe Litchfield	Marizanne Kapp	Laura Wolvaardt	**Ash Gardner**	Hayley Matthews
£50k	Emma Lamb	Sarah Glenn	Deandra Dottin	Kate Cross	**Lauren Winfield-Hill**	Lauren Bell	Alana King	Jess Jonassen
£50k	Amy Jones	Dani Gibson	**Beth Mooney**	Georgia Wareham	Alice Capsey	Maia Bouchier	Heather Graham	**Tammy Beaumont**
£36k	Megan Schutt	Deepti Sharma	Seren Smale	Linsey Smith	Meg Lanning	Sophie Devine	Jodi Grewcock	Sarah Bryce
£36k	Emily Arlott	**Charlie Dean**	Lauren Filer	Bess Heath	Amanda-Jade Wellington	Freya Kemp	Bryony Smith	Shabnim Ismail
£20k	Charis Pavely	Eva Gray	Eve Jones	Alice Davidson-Richards	Ryana MacDonald-Gay	Chloe Tryon	Kirstie Gordon	Freya Davies
£20k	Hannah Baker	Georgia Redmayne	Mahika Gaur	**Hollie Armitage**	Tash Farrant	**Georgia Adams**	Grace Scrivens	Georgia Elwiss
£16k	Georgie Boyce	Issy Wong	Fi Morris	Grace Potts	Phoebe Franklin	Mady Villiers	Emma Jones	Katie George
£16k	Sterre Kalis	Cordelia Griffith	Kathryn Bryce	Grace Ballinger	Sophia Smale	Josie Groves	Alexa Stonehouse	Georgia Davis
£12.5k	Marie Kelly	Tara Norris	Ella McCaughan	Lucy Higham	Kalea Moore	Rhianna Southby	Ellie Threlkeld	Katie Levick
£12.5k	Bethan Ellis	Sophie Munro	Dani Gregory	Davina Perrin	Jo Gardner	Tilly Corteen-Coleman	Nat Wraith	Emily Windsor
£10k	Ailsa Lister	Rebecca Tyson	Alice Monaghan	Ella Claridge	Rachel Slater	Phoebe Graham	Cassidy McCarthy	Beth Langston
£10k (wildcard)	Mary Taylor	Abi Norgrove	Darcey Carter	Katherine Fraser	Daisy Gibb	Phoebe Turner	Sophie Morris	Alex Griffiths
£10k (wildcard)	Phoebe Brett	Kate Coppack	Esmae MacGregor	Sophia Turner	Rebecca Odgers	Amara Carr	Grace Thompson	Charley Phillips

==== Replacements ====
- Birmingham Phoenix:

1. Millie Taylor replaced Charis Pavely due to injury. 2. Meg Austin replaced Millie Taylor due to injury.

- London Spirit:

1. Kira Chathli replaced Heather Knight due to injury. 2. Charli Knott replaced Deepti Sharma due to international commitments.

- Manchester Originals:

1. Amuruthaa Surenkumar replaced Ella McCaughan due to injury.

- Northern Superchargers:

1. Nicola Carey replaced Georgia Wareham due to injury.

- Oval Invincibles:

1. Ellie Anderson replaced Ryana MacDonald-Gay due to injury.

=== Men ===
Price	Birmingham Phoenix	London Spirit	Manchester Originals	Northern Superchargers	Oval Invincibles	Southern Brave	Trent Rockets	Welsh Fire
Central	Ben Duckett	Jamie Smith	Jos Buttler	**Harry Brook**	Sam Curran	Jofra Archer	Joe Root	Chris Woakes
£200k	Trent Boult	Jamie Overton	Noor Ahmad	David Miller	Tom Curran	Michael Bracewell	**David Willey**	Jonny Bairstow
£200k	**Liam Livingstone**	Liam Dawson	**Phil Salt**	Adil Rashid	Will Jacks	**James Vince**	Marcus Stoinis	Steve Smith
£120k	Joe Clarke	David Warner	Rachin Ravindra	Zak Crawley	Rashid Khan	Chris Jordan	Lockie Ferguson	David Payne
£120k	Jacob Bethell	Dan Worrall	Lewis Gregory	Mitchell Santner	Jordan Cox	Tymal Mills	Tom Banton	Tom Kohler-Cadmore
£78.5k	Adam Milne	**Kane Williamson**	Ben McKinney	Dan Lawrence	**Sam Billings**	Faf du Plessis	Max Holden	Paul Walter
£78.5k	Benny Howell	Richard Gleeson	Heinrich Klaasen	Brydon Carse	Saqib Mahmood	Leus du Plooy	George Linde	**Tom Abell**
£63k	Tim Southee	Luke Wood	George Garton	Ben Dwarshuis	Jason Behrendorff	Laurie Evans	Sam Cook	Riley Meredith
£63k	Dan Mousley	Olly Stone	Matty Hurst	Matty Potts	Gus Atkinson	Craig Overton	John Turner	Chris Green
£52k	Will Smeed	Ashton Turner	Josh Tongue	Michael Pepper	Donovan Ferreira	Reece Topley	Adam Hose	Saif Zaib
£52k	Chris Wood	Ollie Pope	Scott Currie	Dawid Malan	Nathan Sowter	Finn Allen	Rehan Ahmed	Luke Wells
£41.5k	Harry Moore	Jafer Chohan	Tom Hartley	Pat Brown	Jordan Clark	Jordan Thompson	Sam Hain	Josh Hull
£41.5k	Tom Helm	Keaton Jennings	Sonny Baker	Graham Clark	Tawanda Muyeye	Danny Briggs	Tom Alsop	Stevie Eskinazi
£31k	Aneurin Donald	Wayne Madsen	Tom Aspinwall	Tom Lawes	Miles Hammond	James Coles	Calvin Harrison	Mason Crane
£31k (wildcard)	Liam Patterson-White	Sean Dickson	James Anderson	James Fuller	George Scrimshaw	Toby Albert	Callum Parkinson	Ajeet Singh Dale
£31k (wildcard)	Louis Kimber	Ryan Higgins	Marchant de Lange	Rocky Flintoff	Zafar Gohar	Hilton Cartwright	Ben Sanderson	Ben Kellaway

==== Replacements ====
- Birmingham Phoenix:

1. Freddie McCann replaced Harry Moore due to injury.

- London Spirit:

1. Dan Douthwaite replaced Ollie Pope for one match due to the India Test series. 2. John Simpson replaced Jamie Smith for one match due to the India Test series.

- Manchester Originals:

1. Mark Chapman replaced Rachin Ravindra for four matches due to international commitments. 2. Farhan Ahmed replaced Marchant de Lange due to injury. 3. Ish Sodhi replaced Noor Ahmad due to international commitments.

- Northern Superchargers:

1. Imad Wasim replaced Mitchell Santner for two matches due to international commitments. 2. Mohammad Amir replaced Ben Dwarshuis due to international commitments. 3. Mitchell Stanley replaced Brydon Carse due to management of workload. 4. Jacob Duffy replaced Mohammad Amir due to prior commitments. 5. Matt Revis replaced Rocky Flintoff due to injury. 6. Samit Patel replaced Mitchell Santner due to injury.

- Oval Invincibles:

1. Adam Zampa replaced Rashid Khan due to international commitments.

- Southern Brave:

1. Jason Roy replaced Faf du Plessis due to injury. 2. Henry Crocombe replaced Finn Allen due to injury

- Trent Rockets:

1. Akeal Hosein replaced George Linde for two matches due to international commitments. 2. Dillon Pennington replaced John Turner due to injury. 3. Tom Moores replaced Tom Alsop for one match as injury cover. 4. Ben Cox replaced Adam Hose due to injury. 5. Ross Whiteley replaced Tom Alsop due to injury.

- Welsh Fire:

1. Matt Henry replaced Chris Woakes due to injury.

== Standings ==
=== Women ===
Pos	Team	Pld	W	L	NR	Pts	NRR	Qualification
1	Southern Brave	8	8	0	0	32	1.164	Advanced to the Final
2	Northern Superchargers (C)	8	6	2	0	24	1.216	Advanced to the Eliminator
3	London Spirit	8	5	3	0	20	0.500	Advanced to the Eliminator
4	Trent Rockets	8	4	4	0	16	0.115	
5	Manchester Originals	8	4	4	0	16	−0.141	
6	Oval Invincibles	8	2	6	0	8	−0.899	
7	Birmingham Phoenix	8	2	6	0	8	−1.122	
8	Welsh Fire	8	1	7	0	4	−0.830	

Source: ESPNcricinfo
(C) Champions

=== Win-loss table Women ===
Below is a summary of results for each team's eight regular season matches, plus finals where applicable, in chronological order. A team's opponent for any given match is listed above the margin of victory/defeat.

Team	League stage								Play-offs		Pos.
Team	1	2	3	4	5	6	7	8	E	F	Pos.
Birmingham Phoenix (BP)	TR; 11 runs	SB; 15 runs	OI; 22 runs	NS; 8 wickets	LS; 88 runs	WF; 36 runs	MO; 16 runs	TR; 3 wickets	X	X	7th
London Spirit (LS)	OI; 17 runs	WF; 2 runs	MO; 3 wickets	TR; 33 runs	BP; 88 runs	NS; 8 wickets	SB; 8 wickets	OI; 8 wickets	NS; 42 runs	X	3rd E
Manchester Originals (MO)	SB; 6 wickets	OI; 2 runs	LS; 3 wickets	WF; 7 wickets	NS; 5 runs	TR; 10 wickets	BP; 16 runs	NS; 8 wickets	X	X	5th
Northern Superchargers (NS)	WF; 47 runs	TR; 8 wickets	SB; 8 wickets	BP; 8 wickets	MO; 5 runs	LS; 8 wickets	OI; 7 wickets	MO; 8 wickets	LS; 42 runs	SB; 7 wickets	2nd C
Oval Invincibles (OI)	LS; 17 runs	MO; 2 runs	BP; 22 runs	WF; 39 runs	SB; 89 runs	TR; 6 wickets	NS; 7 wickets	LS; 8 wickets	X	X	6th
Southern Brave (SB)	MO; 6 wickets	BP; 15 runs	NS; 8 wickets	TR; 6 wickets	OI; 89 runs	WF; 3 wickets	LS; 8 wickets	WF; 29 runs	→	NS; 7 wickets	1st RU
Trent Rockets (TR)	BP; 11 runs	NS; 8 wickets	LS; 33 runs	SB; 6 wickets	MO; 10 wickets	OI; 6 wickets	WF; 23 runs	BP; 3 wickets	X	X	4th
Welsh Fire (WF)	NS; 47 runs	LS; 2 runs	MO; 7 wickets	OI; 39 runs	SB; 3 wickets	BP; 36 runs	TR; 23 runs	SB; 29 runs	X	X	8th

Team's results→	Won	Tied	Lost	N/R

=== Men ===
Pos	Team	Pld	W	L	T	NR	Pts	NRR	Qualification
1	Oval Invincibles (C)	8	6	2	0	0	24	1.786	Advanced to the Final
2	Trent Rockets	8	6	2	0	0	24	0.393	Advanced to the Eliminator
3	Northern Superchargers	8	5	3	0	0	20	0.083	Advanced to the Eliminator
4	Southern Brave	8	4	4	0	0	16	−0.223	
5	Birmingham Phoenix	8	3	5	0	0	12	−0.211	
6	Manchester Originals	8	3	5	0	0	12	−0.437	
7	London Spirit	8	3	5	0	0	12	−0.701	
8	Welsh Fire	8	2	6	0	0	8	−0.504	

Source: ESPNcricinfo
(C) Champions

=== Win-loss table Men ===
Below is a summary of results for each team's eight regular season matches, plus finals where applicable, in chronological order. A team's opponent for any given match is listed above the margin of victory/defeat.

Team	League stage								Play-offs		Pos.
Team	1	2	3	4	5	6	7	8	E	F	Pos.
Birmingham Phoenix (BP)	TR; 6 wickets	SB; 9 wickets	OI; 4 wickets	NS; 36 runs	LS; 7 wickets	WF; 8 wickets	MO; 7 wickets	TR; 3 wickets	X	X	5th
London Spirit (LS)	OI; 6 wickets	WF; 8 runs	MO; 10 runs	TR; 21 runs	BP; 7 wickets	NS; 8 wickets	SB; 47 runs	OI; 6 wickets	X	X	7th
Manchester Originals (MO)	SB; 1 wicket	OI; 9 wickets	LS; 10 runs	WF; 25 runs	NS; 57 runs	TR; 7 wickets	BP; 7 wickets	NS; 7 wickets	X	X	6th
Northern Superchargers (NS)	WF; 8 wickets	TR; 5 wickets	SB; 3 wickets	BP; 36 runs	MO; 57 runs	LS; 8 wickets	OI; 16 runs	MO; 7 wickets	TR; N/R	X	3rd E
Oval Invincibles (OI)	LS; 6 wickets	MO; 9 wickets	BP; 4 wickets	WF; 83 runs	SB; 7 wickets	TR; 6 wickets	NS; 16 runs	LS; 6 wickets	→	TR; 26 runs	1st C
Southern Brave (SB)	MO; 1 wicket	BP; 9 wickets	NS; 3 wickets	TR; 4 wickets	OI; 7 wickets	WF; 4 runs	LS; 47 runs	WF; 4 runs	X	X	4th
Trent Rockets (TR)	BP; 6 wickets	NS; 5 wickets	LS; 21 runs	SB; 4 wickets	MO; 7 wickets	OI; 6 wickets	WF; 3 wickets	BP; 3 wickets	NS; N/R	OV; 26 runs	2nd RU
Welsh Fire (WF)	NS; 8 wickets	LS; 8 runs	MO; 25 runs	OI; 83 runs	SB; 4 runs	BP; 8 wickets	TR; 3 wickets	SB; 4 runs	X	X	8th

Team's results→	Won	Tied	Lost	N/R

== Results ==
=== Women ===
Match 1
5 August 2025
14:45
Scorecard

London Spirit; 176/5 (100 balls)	v	Oval Invincibles; 159/4 (100 balls)
Grace Harris 89* (42); Marizanne Kapp 2/23 (20 balls)		Meg Lanning 85 (51); Issy Wong 2/26 (20 balls)

London Spirit won by 17 runs
Lord's, London
Umpires: Sue Redfern and Jack Shantry
Player of the match: Grace Harris (London Spirit)

- Oval Invincibles won the toss and elected to field.

Match 2
6 August 2025
15:00
Scorecard

Manchester Originals; 95/8 (100 balls)	v	Southern Brave; 96/4 (89 balls)
Seren Smale 40* (34); Lauren Bell 3/28 (20 balls)		Laura Wolvaardt 42* (37); Danielle Gregory 1/11 (15 balls)

Southern Brave won by 6 wickets
Old Trafford, Manchester
Umpires: Tom Lungley and Rob White
Player of the match: Lauren Bell (Southern Brave)

- Southern Brave won the toss and elected to field.

Match 3
7 August 2025
15:00
Scorecard

Northern Superchargers; 141/4 (100 balls)	v	Welsh Fire; 94 (98 balls)
Hollie Armitage 34* (27); Hayley Matthews 2/18 (20 balls)		Tammy Beaumont 36 (21); Georgia Wareham 2/14 (20 balls)

Northern Superchargers won by 47 runs
Headingley, Leeds
Umpires: Sue Redfern and Jack Shantry
Player of the match: Georgia Wareham (Northern Superchargers)

- Northern Superchargers won the toss and elected to bat.

Match 4
8 August 2025
15:00
Scorecard

Birmingham Phoenix; 148/5 (100 balls)	v	Trent Rockets; 137/6 (100 balls)
Emma Lamb 55 (32); Alana King 2/30 (20 balls)		Nat Sciver-Brunt 64 (40); Hannah Baker 2/18 (15 balls)

Birmingham Phoenix won by 11 runs
Edgbaston, Birmingham
Umpires: Grace Bambury and Tom Lungley
Player of the match: Emma Lamb (Birmingham Phoenix)

- Birmingham Phoenix won the toss and elected to bat.

Match 5
9 August 2025
11:00
Scorecard

Manchester Originals; 139/6 (100 balls)	v	Oval Invincibles; 137/3 (100 balls)
Beth Mooney 70 (45); Marizanne Kapp 2/22 (20 balls)		Meg Lanning 57 (42); Sophie Ecclestone 1/18 (20 balls)

Manchester Originals won by 2 runs
The Oval, London
Umpires: Rose Fernando and Surendiran Shanmugam
Player of the match: Beth Mooney (Manchester Originals)

- Oval Invincibles won the toss and elected to field.

Match 6
9 August 2025
14:30
Scorecard

London Spirit; 124 (99 balls)	v	Welsh Fire; 122/5 (100 balls)
Charli Knott 47 (33); Freya Davies 3/16 (19 balls)		Sophia Dunkley 36 (29); Grace Harris 1/4 (5 balls)

London Spirit won by 2 runs
Sophia Gardens, Cardiff
Umpires: Anna Harris and Jack Shantry
Player of the match: Charli Knott (London Spirit)

- London Spirit won the toss and elected to bat.

Match 7
10 August 2025
11:00
Scorecard

Southern Brave; 139/7 (100 balls)	v	Birmingham Phoenix; 124 (100 balls)
Danni Wyatt-Hodge 59 (39); Emily Arlott 2/19 (20 balls)		Sterre Kalis 44 (34); Lauren Bell 3/17 (19 balls)

Southern Brave won by 15 runs
Rose Bowl, Southampton
Umpires: Anna Harris and Martin Saggers
Player of the match: Sophie Devine (Southern Brave)

- Birmingham Phoenix won the toss and elected to field.

Match 8
10 August 2025
14:30
Scorecard

Trent Rockets; 128/8 (100 balls)	v	Northern Superchargers; 129/2 (79 balls)
Ashleigh Gardner 61 (32); Kate Cross 3/31 (20 balls)		Davina Perrin 72* (40); Heather Graham 1/22 (15 balls)

Northern Superchargers won by 8 wickets
Trent Bridge, Nottingham
Umpires: Surendiran Shanmugam and Chris Watts
Player of the match: Davina Perrin (Northern Superchargers)

- Trent Rockets won the toss and elected to bat.

Match 9
11 August 2025
15:00
Scorecard

Manchester Originals; 122/6 (100 balls)	v	London Spirit; 124/7 (98 balls)
Deandra Dottin 36 (30); Charlie Dean 2/18 (20 balls)		Grace Harris 50* (32); Amelia Kerr 2/17 (20 balls)

London Spirit won by 3 wickets
Old Trafford, Manchester
Umpires: Hassan Adnan and Surendiran Shanmugam
Player of the match: Grace Harris (London Spirit)

- London Spirit won the toss and elected to field.

Match 10
12 August 2025
15:00
Scorecard

Oval Invincibles; 174/5 (100 balls)	v	Birmingham Phoenix; 152/6 (100 balls)
Alice Capsey 52 (29); Hannah Baker 2/24 (20 balls)		Ailsa Lister 33 (18); Amanda-Jade Wellington 2/27 (20 balls)

Oval Invincibles won by 2 runs
Edgbaston, Birmingham
Umpires: Rose Fernando and Neil Pratt
Player of the match: Alice Capsey (Oval Invincibles)

- Oval Invincibles won the toss and elected to bat.

Match 11
13 August 2025
11:30
Scorecard

Northern Superchargers; 102 (100 balls)	v	Southern Brave; 103/2 (83 balls)
Hollie Armitage 36* (28); Sophie Devine 3/15 (20 balls)		Danni Wyatt-Hodge 43 (21); Katherine Fraser 1/11 (10 balls)

Southern Brave won by 8 wickets
Rose Bowl, Southampton
Umpires: Gabi Brown and Mark Newell
Player of the match: Sophie Devine (Southern Brave)

- Northern Superchargers won the toss and elected to bat.

Match 12
13 August 2025
15:00
Scorecard

Welsh Fire; 73/9 (100 balls)	v	Manchester Originals; 76/3 (81 balls)
Hayley Matthews 22 (33); Lauren Filer 3/8 (20 balls)		Kathryn Bryce 45 (41); Freya Davies 1/8 (15 balls)

Manchester Originals won by 7 wickets
Sophia Gardens, Cardiff
Umpires: Ian Blackwell and Rose Fernando
Player of the match: Mahika Gaur (Manchester Originals)

- Manchester Originals won the toss and elected to field.

Match 13
14 August 2025
15:00
Scorecard

Trent Rockets; 149/6 (100 balls)	v	London Spirit; 116 (95 balls)
Nat Sciver-Brunt 51* (29 balls); Eva Gray 4/19 (20 balls)		Charli Knott 33 (25); Kirstie Gordon 4/15 (20 balls)

Trent Rockets won by 33 runs
Lord's, London
Umpires: Arno Jacobs and Mark Newell
Player of the match: Nat Sciver-Brunt (Trent Rockets)

- London Spirit won the toss and elected to field.

Match 14
15 August 2025
15:00
Scorecard

Birmingham Phoenix; 116/6 (100 balls)	v	Northern Superchargers; 117/2 (74 balls)
Emily Arlott 32* (25); Linsey Smith 2/18 (20 balls)		Phoebe Litchfield 59* (28); Emily Arlott 1/19 (15 balls)

Northern Superchargers won by 8 wickets
Headingley, Leeds
Umpires: Rose Fernando and Jack Shantry
Player of the match: Phoebe Litchfield (Northern Superchargers)

- Birmingham Phoenix won the toss and elected to bat.

Match 15
16 August 2025
11:00
Scorecard

Trent Rockets; 106 (100 balls)	v	Southern Brave; 109/4 (98 balls)
Kirstie Gordon 32 (27); Tilly Corteen-Coleman 4/13 (20 balls)		Maia Bouchier 42 (30); Alana King 1/23 (20 balls); Heather Graham 1/23 (20 balls)

Southern Brave won by 6 wickets
Trent Bridge, Nottingham
Umpires: Hassan Adnan and Gabi Brown
Player of the match: Tilly Corteen-Coleman (Southern Brave)

- Southern Brave won the toss and elected to field.

Match 16
16 August 2025
14:30
Scorecard

Oval Invincibles; 150/5 (100 balls)	v	Welsh Fire; 111 (97 balls)
Alice Capsey 55 (34); Hayley Matthews 2/18 (20 balls)		Sophia Dunkley 56 (41); Sophia Smale 3/13 (17 balls)

Oval Invincibles won by 39 runs
The Oval, London
Umpires: Rose Fernando and Surendiran Shanmugam
Player of the match: Marizanne Kapp (Oval Invincibles)

- Oval Invincibles won the toss and elected to bat.

Match 17
17 August 2025
11:00
Scorecard

Manchester Originals; 117/5 (100 balls)	v	Northern Superchargers; 112/7 (100 balls)
Deandra Dottin 51* (26); Kate Cross 2/21 (20 balls)		Phoebe Litchfield 31 (27); Amelia Kerr 2/20 (20 balls)

Manchester Originals won by 5 runs
Old Trafford, Manchester
Umpires: Neil Pratt and Sue Redfern
Player of the match: Deandra Dottin (Manchester Originals)

- Northern Superchargers won the toss and elected to field.

Match 18
17 August 2025
14:30
Scorecard

London Spirit; 164/6 (100 balls)	v	Birmingham Phoenix; 76 (79 balls)
Kira Chathli 69 (35); Emily Arlott 3/25 (20 balls)		Emma Lamb 23 (13); Eva Gray 2/13 (14 balls)

London Spirit won by 88 runs
Edgbaston, Birmingham
Umpires: Grace Bambury and Jack Shantry
Player of the match: Kira Chathli (London Spirit)

- London Spirit won the toss and elected to bat.

Match 19
18 August 2025
15:00
Scorecard

Southern Brave; 161/6 (100 balls)	v	Oval Invincibles; 72 (83 balls)
Laura Wolvaardt 36 (19); Phoebe Franklin 2/28 (20 balls)		Amanda-Jade Wellington 18* (18); Mady Villiers 3/17 (20 balls)

Southern Brave won by 89 runs
Rose Bowl, Southampton
Umpires: Anna Harris and Surendiran Shanmugam
Player of the match: Sophie Devine (Southern Brave)

- Oval Invincibles won the toss and elected to field.

Match 20
19 August 2025
15:00
Scorecard

Trent Rockets; 111/7 (100 balls)	v	Manchester Originals; 113/0 (82 balls)
Nat Sciver-Brunt 34 (26); Lauren Filer 3/23 (20 balls)		Kathryn Bryce 61* (45)

Manchester Originals won by 10 wickets
Trent Bridge, Nottingham
Umpires: Rose Fernando and Sue Redfern
Player of the match: Sophie Ecclestone (Manchester Originals)

- Manchester Originals won the toss and elected to field.

Match 21
20 August 2025
11:30
Scorecard

Welsh Fire; 111/6 (100 balls)	v	Southern Brave; 112/7 (99 balls)
Georgia Elwiss 36* (36); Lauren Bell 2/21 (20 balls)		Maia Bouchier 35 (30); Jess Jonassen 4/10 (20 balls)

Southern Brave won by 3 wickets
Sophia Gardens, Cardiff
Umpires: Julia Jarvis and Mark Newell
Player of the match: Sophie Devine (Southern Brave)

- Southern Brave won the toss and elected to field.

Match 22
20 August 2025
15:00
Scorecard

London Spirit; 90/8 (100 balls)	v	Northern Superchargers; 93/2 (66 balls)
Georgia Redmayne 29 (29); Annabel Sutherland 3/20 (20 balls)		Phoebe Litchfield 55* (38); Rebecca Tyson 2/6 (10 balls)

Northern Superchargers won by 8 wickets
Lord's, London
Umpires: Rose Fernando and Chris Watts
Player of the match: Phoebe Litchfield (Northern Superchargers)

- London Spirit won the toss and elected to bat.

Match 23
21 August 2025
15:00
Scorecard

Oval Invincibles; 109/7 (100 balls)	v	Trent Rockets; 113/4 (84 balls)
Meg Lanning 45 (35); Ashleigh Gardner 2/10 (10 balls)		Grace Scrivens 34 (27); Amanda-Jade Wellington 1/15 (20 balls)

Trent Rockets won by 6 wickets
The Oval, London
Umpires: Gabi Brown and Chris Watts
Player of the match: Grace Scrivens (Trent Rockets)

- Trent Rockets won the toss and elected to field.

Match 24
22 August 2025
15:00
Scorecard

Welsh Fire; 150/3 (100 balls)	v	Birmingham Phoenix; 114/9 (100 balls)
Sophia Dunkley 53 (43); Megan Schutt 2/11 (20 balls)		Ellyse Perry 55 (43); Shabnim Ismail 3/16 (20 balls)

Welsh Fire won by 36 runs
Edgbaston, Birmingham
Umpires: Gabi Brown and Sue Redfern
Player of the match: Jess Jonassen (Trent Rockets)

- Welsh Fire won the toss and elected to bat.

Match 25
23 August 2025
11:00
Scorecard

Oval Invincibles; 125/6 (100 balls)	v	Northern Superchargers; 127/3 (95 balls)
Lauren Winfield-Hill 37 (30); Kate Cross 2/16 (20 balls)		Alice Davidson-Richards 50 (32); Amanda-Jade Wellington 1/19 (20 balls)

Northern Superchargers won by 7 wickets
Headingley, Leeds
Umpires: Hassan Adnan and James Middlebrook
Player of the match: Alice Davidson-Richards (Northern Superchargers)

- Oval Invincibles won the toss and elected to bat.

Match 26
23 August 2025
14:30
Scorecard

London Spirit; 125/8 (100 balls)	v	Southern Brave; 126/2 (94 balls)
Cordelia Griffith 44 (34); Mady Villiers 3/38 (20 balls)		Laura Wolvaardt 56* (40); Issy Wong 2/34 (20 balls)

Southern Brave won by 8 wickets
Lord's, London
Umpires: Anna Harris and Chris Watts
Player of the match: Laura Wolvaardt (Southern Brave)

- Southern Brave won the toss and elected to field.

Match 27
24 August 2025
11:00
Scorecard

Trent Rockets; 145/6 (100 balls)	v	Welsh Fire; 122/9 (100 balls)
Nat Sciver-Brunt 38 (26); Freya Davies 3/26 (20 balls)		Sophia Dunkley 26 (23); Alana King 3/17 (20 balls)

Trent Rockets won by 23 runs
Sophia Gardens, Cardiff
Umpires: Anna Harris and Jack Shantry
Player of the match: Ashleigh Gardner (Trent Rockets)

- Welsh Fire won the toss and elected to field.

Match 28
24 August 2025
14:30
Scorecard

Birmingham Phoenix; 111/3 (100 balls)	v	Manchester Originals; 95 (100 balls)
Ellyse Perry 55* (48); Deandra Dottin 1/4 (10 balls)		Seren Smale 29 (34); Megan Schutt 3/14 (20 balls)

Birmingham Phoenix won by 16 runs
Old Trafford, Manchester
Umpires: Gabi Brown and Neil Pratt
Player of the match: Sterre Kalis (Birmingham Phoenix)

- Birmingham Phoenix won the toss and elected to bat.

Match 29
25 August 2025
15:00
Scorecard

Oval Invincibles; 108/8 (100 balls)	v	London Spirit; 112/2 (62 balls)
Marizanne Kapp 32 (25); Eva Gray 2/12 (20 balls); Charlie Dean 2/12 (20 balls)		Kira Chathli 53 (29); Phoebe Franklin 2/10 (7 balls)

London Spirit won by 8 wickets
The Oval, London
Umpires: Hassan Adnan and Rose Fernando
Player of the match: Charlie Dean (London Spirit)

- London Spirit won the toss and elected to field.

Match 30
26 August 2025
15:00
Scorecard

Manchester Originals; 94 (95 balls)	v	Northern Superchargers; 96/2 (65 balls)
Alice Monaghan 26 (17); Annabel Sutherland 3/15 (20 balls)		Annabel Sutherland 30* (17); Alice Davidson-Richards 30 (18); Lauren Filer 1/16 (15 balls)

Northern Superchargers won by 8 wickets
Headingley, Leeds
Umpires: Neil Pratt and Surendiran Shanmugam
Player of the match: Annabel Sutherland (Northern Superchargers)

- Northern Superchargers won the toss and elected to field.

Match 31
27 August 2025
15:00
Scorecard

Birmingham Phoenix; 123/6 (100 balls)	v	Trent Rockets; 126/7 (97 balls)
Emma Lamb 56* (42); Kirstie Gordon 2/24 (20 balls)		Nat Sciver-Brunt 52 (29); Phoebe Brett 3/19 (20 balls)

Trent Rockets won by 3 wickets
Trent Bridge, Nottingham
Umpires: Hassan Adnan and Julia Jarvis
Player of the match: Nat Sciver-Brunt (Trent Rockets)

- Birmingham Phoenix won the toss and elected to bat.

Match 32
28 August 2025
15:00
Scorecard

Southern Brave; 106/8 (100 balls)	v	Welsh Fire; 77/9 (100 balls)
Georgia Adams 30* (26); Hayley Matthews 2/16 (20 balls)		Tammy Beaumont 28 (33); Lauren Bell 4/6 (20 balls)

Southern Brave won by 29 runs
Rose Bowl, Southampton
Umpires: Grace Bambury and Mark Newell
Player of the match: Lauren Bell (Southern Brave)

- Welsh Fire won the toss and elected to field.

=== Men ===
Match 1
5 August 2025
18:30 (D/N)
Scorecard

London Spirit; 80 (94 balls)	v	Oval Invincibles; 81/4 (69 balls)
Ashton Turner 21 (14); Rashid Khan 3/11 (20 balls)		Will Jacks 24 (24); Liam Dawson 2/9 (20 balls)

Oval Invincibles won by 6 wickets
Lord's, London
Umpires: James Middlebrook and David Millns
Player of the match: Rashid Khan (Oval Invincibles)

- London Spirit won the toss and elected to bat.

Match 2
6 August 2025
18:30 (D/N)
Scorecard

Manchester Originals; 131/4 (100 balls)	v	Southern Brave; 133/9 (99 balls)
Phil Salt 60 (41); Tymal Mills 3/22 (20 balls)		Jason Roy 30 (22); Scott Currie 4/28 (20 balls)

Southern Brave won by 1 wicket
Old Trafford, Manchester
Umpires: Graham Lloyd and Steve O'Shaughnessy
Player of the match: Tymal Mills (Southern Brave)

- Southern Brave won the toss and elected to field.

Match 3
7 August 2025
18:30 (D/N)
Scorecard

Welsh Fire; 143/9 (100 balls)	v	Northern Superchargers; 147/2 (89 balls)
Jonny Bairstow 42 (23); Adil Rashid 2/25 (20 balls)		Zak Crawley 67* (38); Riley Meredith 2/33 (20 balls)

Northern Superchargers won by 8 wickets
Headingley, Leeds
Umpires: James Middlebrook and David Millns
Player of the match: Zak Crawley (Northern Superchargers)

- Northern Superchargers won the toss and elected to field.

Match 4
8 August 2025
18:30 (D/N)
Scorecard

Birmingham Phoenix; 122/6 (100 balls)	v	Trent Rockets; 123/4 (78 balls)
Liam Livingstone 39 (30); Lockie Ferguson 3/20 (20 balls)		Tom Banton 43 (29); Benny Howell 2/25 (20 balls)

Trent Rockets won by 6 wickets
Edgbaston, Birmingham
Umpires: Graham Lloyd and Steve O'Shaughnessy
Player of the match: Lockie Ferguson (Trent Rockets)

- Birmingham Phoenix won the toss and elected to bat.

Match 5
9 August 2025
14:30
Scorecard

Manchester Originals; 128 (100 balls)	v	Oval Invincibles; 129/1 (57 balls)
Phil Salt 41 (32); Rashid Khan 3/19 (20 balls)		Will Jacks 61 (26); Lewis Gregory 1/31 (10 balls)

Oval Invincibles won by 9 wickets
The Oval, London
Umpires: Martin Saggers and Russell Warren
Player of the match: Rashid Khan (Oval Invincibles)

- Oval Invincibles won the toss and elected to field.

Match 6
9 August 2025
18:00 (D/N)
Scorecard

London Spirit; 163/5 (100 balls)	v	Welsh Fire; 155/6 (100 balls)
David Warner 70* (45); Josh Hull 2/36 (20 balls)		Jonny Bairstow 86* (50); Daniel Worrall 2/31 (20 balls)

London Spirit won by 8 runs
Sophia Gardens, Cardiff
Umpires: Tom Lungley and Rob White
Player of the match: David Warner (London Spirit)

- Welsh Fire won the toss and elected to field.

Match 7
10 August 2025
14:30
Scorecard

Birmingham Phoenix; 106/7 (100 balls)	v	Southern Brave; 109/1 (81 balls)
Joe Clarke 36 (27); Michael Bracewell 3/10 (15 balls)		Leus du Plooy 48* (39); Benny Howell 1/17 (20 balls)

Southern Brave won by 9 wickets
Rose Bowl, Southampton
Umpires: Ian Blackwell and Ben Debenham
Player of the match: Michael Bracewell (Southern Brave)

- Southern Brave won the toss and elected to field.

Match 8
10 August 2025
18:00 (D/N)
Scorecard

Northern Superchargers; 124/9 (100 balls)	v	Trent Rockets; 128/5 (96 balls)
Harry Brook 45 (30); Marcus Stoinis 2/0 (5 balls)		Tom Banton 37 (25); Imad Wasim 3/19 (20 balls)

Trent Rockets won by 5 wickets
Trent Bridge, Nottingham
Umpires: Michael Gough and Graham Lloyd
Player of the match: Akeal Hosein (Trent Rockets)

- Trent Rockets won the toss and elected to field.

Match 9
11 August 2025
18:30 (D/N)
Scorecard

Manchester Originals; 163/6 (100 balls)	v	London Spirit; 153/6 (100 balls)
Jos Buttler 46 (37); Jamie Overton 2/26 (20 balls)		David Warner 71 (51); Josh Tongue 3/29 (20 balls)

Manchester Originals won by 10 runs
Old Trafford, Manchester
Umpires: Michael Gough and Steve O'Shaughnessy
Player of the match: Sonny Baker (Manchester Originals)

- Manchester Originals won the toss and elected to bat.

Match 10
12 August 2025
18:30 (D/N)
Scorecard

Birmingham Phoenix; 182/6 (98 balls)	v	Oval Invincibles; 180/8 (100 balls)
Liam Livingstone 69 (27); Trent Boult 2/20 (20 balls)		Donovan Ferreira 63 (29); Saqib Mahmood 3/28 (13 balls)

Birmingham Phoenix won by 4 wickets
Edgbaston, Birmingham
Umpires: Mike Burns and Russell Warren
Player of the match: Liam Livingstone (Birmingham Phoenix)

- Birmingham Phoenix won the toss and elected to field.

Match 11
13 August 2025
15:00
Scorecard

Southern Brave; 139/5 (100 balls)	v	Northern Superchargers; 141/7 (100 balls)
Laurie Evans 53 (34); Jacob Duffy 3/26 (20 balls)		Graham Clark 38* (24 balls); Craig Overton 3/29 (20 balls)

Northern Superchargers won by 3 wickets
Rose Bowl, Southampton
Umpires: James Middlebrook and Martin Saggers
Player of the match: Graham Clark (Northern Superchargers)

- Northern Superchargers won the toss and elected to field.

Match 12
13 August 2025
18:30 (D/N)
Scorecard

Welsh Fire; 137/8 (100 balls)	v	Manchester Originals; 112 (97 balls)
Tom Kohler-Cadmore 26 (16); Scott Currie 3/21 (20 balls)		Jos Buttler 57 (34); Riley Meredith 4/9 (17 balls)

Welsh Fire won by 25 runs
Sophia Gardens, Cardiff
Umpires: Steve O'Shaughnessy and Rob White
Player of the match: Chris Green (Welsh Fire)

- Manchester Originals won the toss and elected to field.

Match 13
14 August 2025
18:30 (D/N)
Scorecard

London Spirit; 162/5 (100 balls)	v	Trent Rockets; 141/6 (100 balls)
Jamie Smith 52 (34); Marcus Stoinis 2/27 (20 balls)		Tom Banton 46 (31); Daniel Worrall 2/32 (20 balls)

London Spirit won by 21 runs
Lord's, London
Umpires: James Middlebrook and Russell Warren
Player of the match: Jamie Smith (London Spirit)

- Trent Rockets won the toss and elected to field.

Match 14
15 August 2025
18:30 (D/N)
Scorecard

Northern Superchargers; 193/5 (100 balls)	v	Birmingham Phoenix; 157/9 (100 balls)
Dawid Malan 58 (34); Chris Wood 2/34 (20 balls)		Jacob Bethell 48 (23); Matthew Potts 3/26 (20 balls)

Northern Superchargers won by 36 runs
Headingley, Leeds
Umpires: Michael Gough and Rob White
Player of the match: Adil Rashid (Northern Superchargers)

- Birmingham Phoenix won the toss and elected to field.

Match 15
16 August 2025
14:30
Scorecard

Southern Brave; 140/4 (100 balls)	v	Trent Rockets; 145/6 (96 balls)
Leus du Plooy 55 (34); Marcus Stoinis 2/18 (15 balls)		Tom Moores 55 (30); Jordan Thompson 2/17 (15 balls)

Trent Rockets won by 4 wickets
Trent Bridge, Nottingham
Umpires: Michael Gough and Tom Lungley
Player of the match: Tom Moores (Trent Rockets)

- Trent Rockets won the toss and elected to field.

Match 16
16 August 2025
18:00 (D/N)
Scorecard

Oval Invincibles; 226/4 (100 balls)	v	Welsh Fire; 143 (93 balls)
Jordan Cox 86* (29); Matt Henry 2/39 (20 balls)		Jonny Bairstow 50 (28); Tom Curran 4/15 (18 balls)

Oval Invincibles won by 83 runs
The Oval, London
Umpires: Ian Blackwell (Eng) and Arno Jacobs (SA)
Player of the match: Jordan Cox (Oval Invincibles)

- Welsh Fire won the toss and elected to field.

Match 17
17 August 2025
14:30
Scorecard

Manchester Originals; 171/3 (100 balls)	v	Northern Superchargers; 114 (87 balls)
Jos Buttler 64* (45); Matthew Potts 2/39 (20 balls)		David Miller 38 (22); Josh Tongue 3/21 (20 balls)

Manchester Originals won by 57 runs
Old Trafford, Manchester
Umpires: Rob White and James Middlebrook
Player of the match: Jos Buttler (Manchester Originals)

- Manchester Originals won the toss and elected to bat.

Match 18
17 August 2025
18:00 (D/N)
Scorecard

London Spirit; 126/6 (100 balls)	v	Birmingham Phoenix; 131/3 (65 balls)
Kane Williamson 33 (29); Trent Boult 2/20 (20 balls)		Joe Clarke 54 (25); Liam Dawson 1/10 (8 balls)

Birmingham Phoenix won by 7 wickets
Edgbaston, Birmingham
Umpires: Arno Jacobs (SA) and Martin Saggers (Eng)
Player of the match: Liam Livingstone (Birmingham Phoenix)

- Birmingham Phoenix won the toss and elected to field.

Match 19
18 August 2025
18:30 (D/N)
Scorecard

Southern Brave; 133 (98 balls)	v	Oval Invincibles; 134/3 (89 balls)
Hilton Cartwright 42 (30); Rashid Khan 3/20 (20 balls)		Jordan Cox 56 (37); Craig Overton 2/21 (20 balls)

Oval Invincibles won by 7 wickets
Rose Bowl, Southampton
Umpires: Ben Debenham and Alex Wharf
Player of the match: Sam Curran (Oval Invincibles)

- Oval Invincibles won the toss and elected to field.

Match 20
19 August 2025
18:30 (D/N)
Scorecard

Manchester Originals; 98/8 (100 balls)	v	Trent Rockets; 101/3 (74 balls)
Lewis Gregory 33* (21); David Willey 3/11 (20 balls)		Rehan Ahmed 45* (35); Sonny Baker 1/11 (10 balls)

Trent Rockets won by 7 wickets
Trent Bridge, Nottingham
Umpires: Ian Blackwell and David Millns
Player of the match: David Willey (Trent Rockets)

- Trent Rockets won the toss and elected to field.

Match 21
20 August 2025
15:00
Scorecard

Southern Brave; 129/8 (100 balls)	v	Welsh Fire; 125/8 (100 balls)
Hilton Cartwright 51* (19); Matt Henry 2/5 (20 balls)		Tom Kohler-Cadmore 25 (28); Jofra Archer 3/20 (20 balls)

Southern Brave won by 4 runs
Sophia Gardens, Cardiff
Umpires: Mark Newell and Tom Lungley
Player of the match: Hilton Cartwright (Southern Brave)

- Welsh Fire won the toss and elected to field.

Match 22
20 August 2025
18:30 (D/N)
Scorecard

London Spirit; 135/3 (100 balls)	v	Northern Superchargers; 138/2 (82 balls)
Ollie Pope 52* (38); Tom Lawes 2/34 (20 balls)		Zak Crawley 55* (38); Jamie Overton 1/22 (15 balls)

Northern Superchargers won by 8 wickets
Lord's, London
Umpires: Mike Burns and Ben Debenham
Player of the match: Zak Crawley (Northern Superchargers)

- Northern Superchargers won the toss and elected to field.

Match 23
21 August 2025
18:30 (D/N)
Scorecard

Trent Rockets; 171/7 (100 balls)	v	Oval Invincibles; 173/4 (89 balls)
Joe Root 76 (41); Rashid Khan 2/19 (20 balls)		Jordan Cox 58* (32); Rehan Ahmed 2/25 (20 balls)

Oval Invincibles won by 6 wickets
The Oval, London
Umpires: Nigel Llong and Martin Saggers
Player of the match: Sam Curran (Oval Invincibles)

- Oval Invincibles won the toss and elected to field.

Match 24
22 August 2025
18:30 (D/N)
Scorecard

Birmingham Phoenix; 138/9 (100 balls)	v	Welsh Fire; 140/2 (89 balls)
Jacob Bethell 38 (28); Chris Green 3/27 (20 balls)		Steve Smith 47* (36); Benny Howell 1/17 (20 balls)

Welsh Fire won by 8 wickets
Edgbaston, Birmingham
Umpires: Ian Blackwell and David Millns
Player of the match: Ben Kellaway (Welsh Fire)

- Welsh Fire won the toss and elected to field.

Match 25
23 August 2025
14:30
Scorecard

Northern Superchargers; 198/4 (100 balls)	v	Oval Invincibles; 182/7 (100 balls)
Harry Brook 56 (27); Nathan Sowter 1/29 (20 balls)		Donovan Ferreira 41 (15); Tom Lawes 2/22 (20 balls)

Northern Superchargers won by 16 runs
Headingley, Leeds
Umpires: Michael Gough and Neil Pratt
Player of the match: Harry Brook (Northern Superchargers)

- Oval Invincibles won the toss and elected to field.

Match 26
23 August 2025
18:00 (D/N)
Scorecard

London Spirit; 186/4 (100 balls)	v	Southern Brave; 139 (92 balls)
Kane Williamson 53 (28); Michael Bracewell 2/26 (20 balls)		Laurie Evans 37 (21); Liam Dawson 3/23 (20 balls)

London Spirit won by 47 runs
Lord's, London
Umpires: Ian Blackwell and Mark Newell
Player of the match: Jamie Smith (London Spirit)

- Southern Brave won the toss and elected to field.

Match 27
24 August 2025
14:30
Scorecard

Welsh Fire; 150/6 (100 balls)	v	Trent Rockets; 152/7 (99 balls)
Stephen Eskinazi 53 (42); Sam Cook 2/17 (15 balls)		Joe Root 64* (41); Chris Green 2/34 (19 balls)

Trent Rockets won by 3 wickets
Sophia Gardens, Cardiff
Umpires: Mike Burns and Ben Debenham
Player of the match: Joe Root (Trent Rockets)

- Trent Rockets won the toss and elected to field.

Match 28
24 August 2025
18:00 (D/N)
Scorecard

Manchester Originals; 109/7 (100 balls)	v	Birmingham Phoenix; 113/3 (83 balls)
Heinrich Klaasen 34 (35); Liam Livingstone 2/11 (20 balls)		Ben Duckett 49* (38); Josh Tongue 2/34 (20 balls)

Birmingham Phoenix won by 7 wickets
Old Trafford, Manchester
Umpires: Mike Burns and James Middlebrook
Player of the match: Joe Clarke (Birmingham Phoenix)

- Manchester Originals won the toss and elected to bat.

Match 29
25 August 2025
18:30 (D/N)
Scorecard

London Spirit; 152/7 (100 balls)	v	Oval Invincibles; 153/4 (78 balls)
Jamie Overton 31 (18); Nathan Sowter 2/23 (20 balls)		Jordan Cox 47 (27); Liam Dawson 2/30 (18 balls)

Oval Invincibles won by 6 wickets
The Oval, London
Umpires: Ben Debenham and Rob White
Player of the match: Will Jacks (Oval Invincibles)

- Oval Invincibles won the toss and elected to field.

Match 30
26 August 2025
18:30 (D/N)
Scorecard

Northern Superchargers; 139/8 (100 balls)	v	Manchester Originals; 140/3 (84 balls)
Samit Patel 42 (19); Tom Aspinwall 3/17 (20 balls)		Jos Buttler 70 (37); Jacob Duffy 1/16 (15 balls)

Manchester Originals won by 7 wickets
Headingley, Leeds
Umpires: James Middlebrook and Steve O'Shaughnessy
Player of the match: Jos Buttler (Manchester Originals)

- Manchester Originals won the toss and elected to field.

Match 31
27 August 2025
18:30 (D/N)
Scorecard

Birmingham Phoenix; 111/9 (100 balls)	v	Trent Rockets; 113/7 (99 balls)
Dan Mousley 26 (25); Rehan Ahmed 3/15 (20 balls)		Rehan Ahmed 37 (23); Jacob Bethell 2/22 (19 balls)

Trent Rockets won by 3 wickets
Trent Bridge, Nottingham
Umpires: Graham Lloyd and David Millns
Player of the match: Rehan Ahmed (Trent Rockets)

- Trent Rockets won the toss and elected to field.

Match 32
28 August 2025
18:30 (D/N)
Scorecard

Southern Brave; 167/7 (100 balls)	v	Welsh Fire; 163/6 (100 balls)
Jason Roy 70 (39); David Payne 2/17 (20 balls)		Tom Kohler-Cadmore 84 (46); Craig Overton 3/22 (20 balls)

Southern Brave won by 4 runs
Rose Bowl, Southampton
Umpires: Mike Burns and Mark Newell
Player of the match: Craig Overton (Southern Brave)

- Welsh Fire won the toss and elected to field.

== Knockout stages ==
=== Women ===
Eliminator			Final
			1	Southern Brave	115/6 (100 balls)
2	Northern Superchargers	214/5 (100 balls)	EW	Northern Superchargers	119/3 (88 balls)
3	London Spirit	172/9 (100 balls)

==== Eliminator ====
Eliminator
30 August 2025
14:15
Scorecard

Northern Superchargers; 214/5 (100 balls)	v	London Spirit; 172/9 (100 balls)
Davina Perrin 101 (43); Sarah Glenn 1/33 (20 balls)		Georgia Redmayne 50* (29); Grace Ballinger 3/22 (20 balls)

Northern Superchargers won by 42 runs
The Oval, London
Umpires: Anna Harris and Gabi Brown
Player of the match: Davina Perrin (Northern Superchargers)

- London Spirit won the toss and elected to field.

==== Final ====
Final
31 August 2025
14:15
Scorecard

Southern Brave; 115/6 (100 balls)	v	Northern Superchargers; 119/3 (88 balls)
Freya Kemp 26 (16); Kate Cross 2/23 (20 balls); Annabel Sutherland 2/23 (20 balls)		Nicola Carey 35* (25); Chloe Tryon 1/19 (15 balls)

Northern Superchargers won by 7 wickets
Lord's, London
Umpires: Sue Redfern and Jack Shantry
Player of the match: Nicola Carey (Northern Superchargers)

- Northern Superchargers won the toss and elected to field.

=== Men ===
Eliminator			Final
			1	Oval Invincibles	168/5 (100 balls)
2	Trent Rockets	12/0 (5 balls)	EW	Trent Rockets	142/8 (100 balls)
3	Northern Superchargers	119/5 (75 balls)

==== Eliminator ====
Eliminator
30 August 2025
18:00 (D/N)
Scorecard

Northern Superchargers; 119/5 (75 balls)	v	Trent Rockets; 12/0 (5 balls)
Dan Lawrence 44* (31); David Willey 2/22 (20 balls)		Tom Banton 6* (4)

No result
The Oval, London
Umpires: James Middlebrook and Martin Saggers

- Trent Rockets won the toss and elected to field.
- Northern Superchargers' innings was interrupted at 75 balls due to rain.
- Trent Rockets were set a revised target of 105 runs from 55 balls.
- No further play was possible due to rain.
- Trent Rockets advanced to final due to better position in the group stage.

==== Final ====
Final
31 August 2025
18:00 (D/N)
Scorecard

Oval Invincibles; 168/5 (100 balls)	v	Trent Rockets; 142/8 (100 balls)
Will Jacks 72 (41); Marcus Stoinis 2/40 (20 balls)		Marcus Stoinis 64 (38); Nathan Sowter 3/25 (20 balls)

Oval Invincibles won by 26 runs
Lord's, London
Umpires: Mike Burns and Michael Gough
Player of the match: Nathan Sowter (Oval Invincibles)

- Oval Invincibles won the toss and elected to bat.

== Statistics ==
=== Most runs ===
Women
Runs	Player	Team	HS
292	Phoebe Litchfield	Northern Superchargers	59*
287	Meg Lanning	Oval Invincibles	85
260	Davina Perrin	Northern Superchargers	101
256	Nat Sciver-Brunt	Trent Rockets	64
239	Danni Wyatt-Hodge	Southern Brave	59

- Source: ESPNcricinfo

Men
Runs	Player	Team	HS
367	Jordan Cox	Oval Invincibles	86*
283	Jos Buttler	Manchester Originals	70
280	Zak Crawley	Northern Superchargers	67*
272	Will Jacks	Oval Invincibles	69*
248	Jonny Bairstow	Welsh Fire	86*

- Source: ESPNcricinfo

=== Most wickets ===
Women
Wickets	Player	Team	BBI
19	Lauren Bell	Southern Brave	4/6
16	Annabel Sutherland	Northern Superchargers	3/15
15	Kate Cross	Northern Superchargers	3/31
14	Hayley Matthews	Welsh Fire	3/21
13	Sophie Devine	Southern Brave	3/15

- Source: ESPNcricinfo

Men
Wickets	Player	Team	BBI
14	Josh Tongue	Manchester Originals	3/21
12	Rehan Ahmed	Northern Superchargers	3/15
12	Rashid Khan	Oval Invincibles	3/11
12	Riley Meredith	Welsh Fire	4/9
12	Sam Curran	Oval Invincibles	3/18
12	Marcus Stoinis	Trent Rockets	2/0
12	Tom Curran	Oval Invincibles	4/15

- Source: ESPNcricinfo
