= England Lions cricket team against Pakistan Shaheens in the UAE in 2025–26 =

Cricket tournament

	Pakistan Shaheens	England Lions
- Dates: 20 February – 9 March 2026
Captains	Shamyl Hussain	Dan Mousley (List A); Jordan Cox (T20)

Twenty20 International series
- Results: England Lions won the 3 (unofficial T20)-match series 3–0
Most runs	Maaz Sadaqat (102)	Jordan Cox (111)
Most wickets	Saad Masood (5)	James Coles (8)

LA series
- Result: England Lions won the 5-match series 1–0
Most runs	Abdul Samad (44)	Asa Tribe 52)
Most wickets	Sufiyan Muqeem (1)	Calvin Harrison (3)

The England Lions cricket team toured United Arab Emirates (UAE) from 20 February to 9 March 2026 to play against Pakistan Shaheens. The tour consists of three Twenty20 (T20s) matches and five unofficial One Day Internationals (ODIs). All the matches played at Sheikh Zayed Cricket Stadium in Abu Dhabi.

England Lions won the 3-match Twenty20 series 3–0. After the first match the five-match List A series was canceled due to 2026 Iran war.

== Squads ==
(Pakistan) Pakisthan Shaheens	England Lions	
List A & T20s	List A	T20s
Shamyl Hussain (c); Shahid Aziz; saad Baig (wk); Ahmed Daniyal; Akif Javed; Mohammad Amir Khan; Saad Khan; Saad Masood; Arafat Minhas; Sameer Minhas; Sufiyan Muqeem; Hasan Nawaz; Rohail Nazir (wk); ~~Ali Raza~~; Maaz Sadaqat; Mohammad Salman; Abdul Samad	Dan Mousley (c); Sonny Baker; Luc Benkenstein; James Coles; Sam Cook; Scott Currie; Calvin Harrison; Eddie Jack; Ben McKinney; Liam Patterson-White; Matthew Potts; Matt Revis; James Rew; Mitchell Stanley; Asa Tribe; James Wharton	Jordan Cox (c); Sonny Baker; Luc Benkenstein; James Coles; Sam Cook; Scott Currie; Calvin Harrison; Eddie Jack; Saqib Mahmood; Ben McKinney; Tom Moores; Dan Mousley; Matt Revis; Will Smeed; Nathan Sowter; Mitchell Stanley; Asa Tribe

On 18 February 2026, Mohammad Amir Khan replaces the injured Ali Raza who got knee injury.

== Unofficial T20I series ==
=== 1st unofficial T20I ===
20 February 2026
14:00
Scorecard

Pakistan Shaheens; 152/7 (20 overs)	v	England Lions; 153/6 (19.1 overs)
Shamyl Hussain 57 (39); James Coles 2/20 (4 overs)		Asa Tribe 64* (48); Akif Javed 2/22 (3 overs)

England Lions won by 4 wickets
Sheikh Zayed Cricket Stadium, Abu Dhabi
Umpires: Aasif Iqbal (UAE) Rizwan Shah (UAE)
Player of the match: Asa Tribe (England Lions)

- England Lions won the toss and elected to field.

=== 2nd unofficial T20I ===
22 February 2026
14:00
Scorecard

England Lions; 183/5 (20 overs)	v	Pakistan Shaheens; 151 (19.3 overs)
James Coles 48 (30); Shahid Aziz 2/26 (4 overs)		Maaz Sadaqat 32 (25); James Coles 4/18 (4 overs)

England Lions won by 32 runs
Sheikh Zayed Cricket Stadium, Abu Dhabi
Umpires: Giby Alex (UAE) and Muhammed Rashid (UAE)
Player of the match: James Coles (England Lions)

- Pakistan Shaheens won the toss and elected to field.

=== 3rd unofficial T20I ===
24 February 2026
19:30 (N)
Scorecard

Pakistan Shaheens; 162/6 (20 overs)	v	England Lions; 163/8 (19.3 overs)
Maaz Sadaqat 53 (36); Scott Currie 3/27 (3 overs)		Jordan Cox 75 (37); Saad Masood 2/22 (4 overs)

England Lions won by 2 wickets
Sheikh Zayed Cricket Stadium, Abu Dhabi
Umpires: Rizwan Shah (UAE) and Suneej K Thottathil (UAE)
Player of the match: Jordan Cox (England Lions)

- England Lions won the toss and elected to field.
- Sameer Minhas (Pakistan Shaheens) made his T20 debut.

== Unofficial ODI series ==
=== 1st unofficial ODI ===
27 February 2026
10:00
Scorecard

Pakistan Shaheens; 152 (38.3 overs)	v	England Lions; 154/1 (24.2 overs)
Abdul Samad 44 (57); Calvin Harrison 3/37 (10 overs)		Asa Tribe 52* (64); Sufiyan Muqeem 1/51 (7.2 overs)

England Lions won by 9 wickets
Sheikh Zayed Cricket Stadium, Abu Dhabi
Umpires: Aasif Iqbal (UAE) and Raziq Khan (UAE)
Player of the match: Calvin Harrison (England Lions)

- England Lions won the toss and elected to field.
- Sameer Minhas (Pakistan Shaheens) made his List A debut.

=== 2nd unofficial ODI ===
1 March 2026
10:00
Scorecard

Pakistan Shaheens	v	England Lions

Match cancelled without a ball bowled
Sheikh Zayed Cricket Stadium, Abu Dhabi
Umpires: Giby Alex (UAE) and Suneej K Thottathil (UAE)

- No toss.
- The match was cancelled amid escalating security situations in the Middle East.

=== 3rd unofficial ODI ===
4 March 2026
10:00
Scorecard

Pakistan Shaheens	v	England Lions

Match cancelled without a ball bowled
Sheikh Zayed Cricket Stadium, Abu Dhabi

- No toss.
- The match was cancelled amid escalating security situations in the Middle East.

=== 4th unofficial ODI ===
6 March 2026
10:00
Scorecard

Pakistan Shaheens	v	England Lions

Match cancelled without a ball bowled
Sheikh Zayed Cricket Stadium, Abu Dhabi

- No toss.
- The match was cancelled amid escalating security situations in the Middle East.

=== 5th unofficial ODI ===
9 March 2026
10:00
Scorecard

Pakistan Shaheens	v	England Lions

Match cancelled without a ball bowled
Sheikh Zayed Cricket Stadium, Abu Dhabi

- No toss.
- The match was cancelled amid escalating security situations in the Middle East.
