= Basil D'Oliveira Trophy =

- The Basil D'Oliveira Trophy
- Countries: South Africa; England
- Administrator: Cricket South Africa; ECB
- Format: Test cricket
- First edition: 2004–05 (South Africa)
- Latest edition: 2022 (England)
- Next edition: 2026–27 (South Africa)
- Tournament format: Test Series
- Number of teams: 2
- Current trophy holder: England (2022)
- Most successful: England (5 series wins)
- Most runs: (South Africa) Hashim Amla (1,903)
- Most wickets: (South Africa) Morne Morkel (75)

The Basil D'Oliveira Trophy is a trophy played for by England and South Africa in the sport of cricket. The trophy is awarded to the team that wins a Test series between the two nations. If the series is a draw, the holder keeps the trophy. It was first contested in the 2004–05 series played in South Africa.

The trophy is named after Basil D'Oliveira, a South African born English Test cricketer whose inclusion in the English squad to tour South Africa in 1968–69 led to the cancellation of the tour following objections from South African authorities due to D'Oliveira's classification as "coloured".

== Results ==
Year	Host	Winning team
2004–05	South Africa	England
2008	England	South Africa
2009–10	South Africa	Drawn
2012	England	South Africa
2015–16	South Africa	England
2017	England	England
2019–20	South Africa	England
2022	England	England

Total Series	South Africa	England	Drawn
8	2	5	1

== Background ==
Prior to the trophy's inception, England and South Africa had played twenty-nine series, sixteen in South Africa and thirteen in England. The overall record was seven South African victories, eighteen English victories, and four drawn series.

== List of Test series ==
England win
South Africa win
Draw

=== Pre Basil D'Oliveira Trophy era ===
Years	Host	Tests	England	South Africa	Drawn	Series Winner
1888–89	South Africa	2	2	0	0	England
1891–92	South Africa	1	1	0	0	England
1895–96	South Africa	3	3	0	0	England
1898–99	South Africa	2	2	0	0	England
1905–06	South Africa	5	1	4	0	South Africa
1907	England	3	1	0	0	England
1909–10	South Africa	5	2	3	0	South Africa
1912	England	3	3	0	0	England
1913–14	South Africa	5	4	0	1	England
1922–23	South Africa	5	2	1	2	England
1924	England	5	3	0	2	England
1927–28	South Africa	5	2	2	1	Draw
1929	England	5	2	0	3	England
1930–31	South Africa	5	0	1	4	South Africa
1935	England	5	0	1	4	South Africa
1938–39	South Africa	5	1	0	4	England
1947	England	5	3	0	2	England
1948–49	South Africa	5	2	0	3	England
1951	England	5	3	1	1	England
1955	England	5	3	2	0	England
1956–57	South Africa	5	2	2	1	Draw
1960	England	5	3	0	2	England
1964–65	South Africa	5	1	0	4	England
1965	England	3	0	1	2	South Africa
1994	England	3	1	1	1	Draw
1995–96	South Africa	5	0	1	4	South Africa
1998	England	5	2	1	2	England
1999–2000	South Africa	5	1	2	2	South Africa
2003	England	5	2	2	1	Draw

== Basil D'Oliveira Trophy ==
Series	Years	Host	Tests	South Africa	England	Drawn	Result	Holder	Player of the series
1	2004–05	South Africa	5	1	2	2	England	England	(England) Andrew Strauss
2	2008	England	4	2	1	1	South Africa	South Africa	(England) Kevin Pietersen (South Africa) Graeme Smith
3	2009–10	South Africa	4	1	1	2	Drawn	South Africa	(England) Graeme Swann (South Africa) Mark Boucher
4	2012	England	3	2	0	1	South Africa	South Africa	(England) Matt Prior (South Africa) Hashim Amla
5	2015–16	South Africa	4	1	2	1	England	England	(England) Ben Stokes
6	2017	England	4	1	3	0	England	England	(England) Moeen Ali (South Africa) Morné Morkel
7	2019–20	South Africa	4	1	3	0	England	England	(England) Ben Stokes
8	2022	England	3	1	2	0	England	England	(England) Ben Stokes (South Africa) Kagiso Rabada
9	2026–27	South Africa	3						
Total			31	10	14	7			

Total Series	South Africa	England	Drawn
8	2	5	1
