= Daisy Gibb =

English cricketer (born 2005)

Personal information
- Full name: Daisy Jane Gibb
- Born: 29 November 2005 (age 20); Pembury, Kent, England
- Batting: Right-handed
- Bowling: Right-arm medium
- Role: Bowler

Domestic team information
- Years: Team
- 2021–present: Sussex
- 2025–present: Hampshire
- 2025–present: Oval Invincibles

Career statistics
Competition	WLA	WT20
Matches	11	32
Runs scored	91	11
Batting average	22.75	11.00
100s/50s	0/0	0/0
Top score	40*	6*
Balls bowled	426	455
Wickets	16	21
Bowling average	20.43	20.57
5 wickets in innings	0	0
10 wickets in match	0	0
Best bowling	3/21	3/4
Catches/stumpings	6/–	6/–
- Source: CricketArchive, 18 August 2025

Daisy Jane Gibb (born 29 November 2005) is an English cricketer who currently plays for Hampshire and Oval Invincibles. She plays as a right-handed batter and Right-arm medium bowler.

== Early life ==
Gibb attended Skippers Hill Prep School, before attending Hurstpierpoint College.

== Domestic career ==
Gibb made her county debut in 2021, for Sussex against Essex, taking 3/4 from one over and five balls. She would play a further two matches in 2021 and three in 2022, before playing six matches for the side in the 2023 Women's Twenty20 Cup, taking 5 wickets. She took a further five wickets in the 2024 Women's Twenty20 Cup, before taking seven wickets in three matches in the 2024 ECB Women's County One-Day.

Gibb was first named in the Southern Vipers academy in 2021, before being named again in 2022, 2023 She signed professionally for Hampshire in 2025, taking four wickets in three matches in the 2025 Women's One-Day Cup, and six wickets in the 2025 Women's T20 Blast. Her performances earned her selection as a 'Wildcard player' for the 2025 The Hundred season, being named in the Oval Invincibles squad.
