= Phoebe Brett =

English cricketer (born 2008)

Personal information
- Full name: Phoebe Julianna Brett
- Born: 5 June 2008 (age 18); Worcester, Worcestershire, England
- Batting: Right-handed
- Bowling: Slow left-arm orthodox
- Role: Bowler

Domestic team information
- Years: Team
- 2023–present: Worcestershire
- 2025–present: Warwickshire
- 2025–present: Birmingham Phoenix

Career statistics
Competition	WLA	WT20
Matches	8	15
Runs scored	38	27
Batting average	4.75	5.40
100s/50s	0/0	0/0
Top score	9	9
Balls bowled	378	342
Wickets	13	24
Bowling average	16.38	12.04
5 wickets in innings	0	0
10 wickets in match	0	0
Best bowling	3/25	4/17
Catches/stumpings	1/–	2/–
- Source: CricketArchive, 17 August 2025

Phoebe Julianna Brett (born 5 June 2008) is an English cricketer who currently plays for Warwickshire and Birmingham Phoenix. She plays as a right-handed batter and slow left-arm orthodox bowler.

== Early life ==
Brett attended King's School in Worcester.

== Domestic career ==
Brett made her county debut in 2023, for Worcestershire against Warwickshire, taking 1/26 from four overs. She played four matches for the side in the 2024 Women's Twenty20 Cup, taking 12 wickets. She took a further three wickets in the 2024 ECB Women's County One-Day.

Brett was named in the Central Sparks academy in 2023, before again being named in the academy in 2024. She signed professionally for Warwickshire in 2025, having spent the majority of the season on loan at Worcestershire from the Bears academy. She made 5 appearances during the 2025 Women's T20 Blast, taking 6 wickets. She was named as a 'Wildcard player' for the 2025 The Hundred season, being named in the Birmingham Phoenix squad.

== International career ==
In October 2024, Brett was selected in the England squad for the 2025 ICC Under-19 Women's T20 World Cup.
