= English cricket team in South Africa in 2004–05 =

England in South Africa in 2004–05
| | England | South Africa |
- Dates: 8 December 2004 – 13 February 2005
| Captains | Michael Vaughan | Graeme Smith |

Test series
- Result: England won the 5-match series 2–1
| Most runs | Andrew Strauss (656) | Jacques Kallis (625) |
| Most wickets | Matthew Hoggard (26) | Makhaya Ntini (25) |
- Player of the series: Andrew Strauss (Eng)

One Day International series
- Results: South Africa won the 7-match series 4–1
| Most runs | Kevin Pietersen (454) | Herschelle Gibbs (356) |
| Most wickets | Kabir Ali (13) | Makhaya Ntini (11) |
- Player of the series: Kevin Pietersen (Eng)

The England cricket team toured South Africa in 2004–05. England won the five-Test series 2–1, achieving their first series win in South Africa for 40 years, when MJK Smith's side were victorious in 1964–65; however, South Africa won the seven-match ODI series 4–1, one match finishing as a tie and the other as "no result".

The Test series saw the awarding of the inaugural Basil D'Oliveira Trophy, named for the South Africa-born England cricketer Basil D'Oliveira.

== Background ==
England went into the tour having won all seven Test matches they played during the English summer, beating the West Indies and New Zealand in series whitewashes.

== Squads ==
| Tests | | ODIs | |
| South Africa | England | South Africa | England |
|---|---|---|---|
| Graeme Smith (c); Hashim Amla; Nicky Boje; Mark Boucher (wk); Zander de Bruyn; AB de Villiers (wk); Boeta Dippenaar; Herschelle Gibbs; Andrew Hall; Jacques Kallis; Charl Langeveldt; André Nel; Makhaya Ntini; Shaun Pollock; Jacques Rudolph; Dale Steyn; Thami Tsolekile (wk); Martin van Jaarsveld | Michael Vaughan (c); James Anderson; Gareth Batty; Mark Butcher; Paul Collingwood; Andrew Flintoff; Ashley Giles; Steve Harmison; Matthew Hoggard; Geraint Jones (wk); Simon Jones; Rob Key; Jonathan Lewis; Chris Read (wk); Andrew Strauss; Graham Thorpe; Marcus Trescothick | Graeme Smith (c); Adam Bacher; Nicky Boje; Mark Boucher (wk); AB de Villiers; Herschelle Gibbs; Andrew Hall; Jacques Kallis; Justin Kemp; Charl Langeveldt; André Nel; Makhaya Ntini; Shaun Pollock; Ashwell Prince; Jacques Rudolph | Michael Vaughan (c); James Anderson; Gareth Batty; Ian Bell; Paul Collingwood; Ashley Giles; Darren Gough; Steve Harmison; Matthew Hoggard; Geraint Jones (wk); Simon Jones; Kabir Ali; Kevin Pietersen; Vikram Solanki; Andrew Strauss; Marcus Trescothick; Alex Wharf |

== Tour matches ==
=== 45-over: Nicky Oppenheimer XI vs England XI ===
8 December 2004
Scorecard

| Nicky Oppenheimer XI; 172/4 (39 overs) | v | England XI; 190/2 (35.3 overs) |
| Neil Johnson 74 (58); Matthew Hoggard 2/29 (8 overs) | | Rob Key 87 (85); Lonwabo Tsotsobe 1/27 (7 overs) |

England XI won by 8 wickets (D/L method)
NF Oppenheimer Ground, Randjesfontein
Umpires: Russell Tiffin (Zim) and Shaid Wadvalla (SA)

- England XI won the toss and elected to field.
- The match was originally scheduled to be played 45-overs-a-side, but rain in the 22nd over of the Nicky Oppenheimer XI's innings reduced the game to 39-overs-a-side.

=== First-class: South Africa A vs England XI ===
11–13 December 2004
Scorecard

| England XI | v | South Africa A |
| 225 (58.1 overs); Andrew Strauss 50 (72); Charl Langeveldt 5/48 (15 overs) | | 281 (73 overs); Martin van Jaarsveld 71 (139); Simon Jones 3/49 (15 overs) |
| 190 (53.1 overs); Michael Vaughan 100 (151); Charl Willoughby 4/63 (14 overs) | | 135/3 (30 overs); Andrew Puttick 45 (65); Matthew Hoggard 1/21 (4 overs) |

South Africa A won by 7 wickets
Sedgars Park, Potchefstroom
Umpires: Karl Hurter (SA) and Laurence Matroos (SA)
Player of the match: Charl Langeveldt (South Africa A)

- South Africa A won the toss and elected to field.
- Bad weather on day 3 interrupted play for a total of 91 minutes.

=== 50-over: South Africa A vs England XI ===
27 January 2005
Scorecard

| South Africa A 251/8 (50 overs) | v | England XI; 252/4 (42.2 overs) |
| Morne van Wyk 104 (147); Kabir Ali 4/40 (10 overs) | | Kevin Pietersen 97 (84); Alfonso Thomas 1/30 (6.2 overs) |

England XI won by 6 wickets
De Beers Diamond Oval, Kimberley
Umpires: Karl Hurter (SA) and Shaid Wadvalla (SA)
Player of the match: Kevin Pietersen (Eng)

- South Africa A won the toss and elected to bat.

== Test series ==
=== 1st Test ===
17–21 December 2004
Scorecard

| South Africa | v | England |
| 337 (110.4 overs); Boeta Dippenaar 110 (245); Matthew Hoggard 3/56 (20 overs) | | 425 (126.5 overs); Andrew Strauss 126 (228); Makhaya Ntini 3/75 (28 overs) |
| 229 (69.1 overs); Jacques Kallis 61 (113); Simon Jones 4/39 (13.1 overs) | | 145/3 (40.4 overs); Andrew Strauss 94* (134); Makhaya Ntini 1/24 (6.4 overs) |

England won by 7 wickets
St George's Park, Port Elizabeth
Umpires: Darrell Hair (Aus) and Simon Taufel (Aus)
Player of the match: Andrew Strauss (Eng)

- South Africa won the toss and elected to bat.
- AB de Villiers and Dale Steyn (both SA) made their Test debuts.
- England were awarded 5 penalty runs in their second innings for the ball hitting a helmet.

=== 2nd Test ===
26–30 December 2004
Scorecard

| England | v | South Africa |
| 139 (57.1 overs); Andrew Strauss 25 (69); Shaun Pollock 4/32 (15.1 overs) | | 332 (102 overs); Jacques Kallis 162 (264); Matthew Hoggard 3/58 (23 overs) |
| 570/7d (172.3 overs); Andrew Strauss 136 (285); Makhaya Ntini 2/111 (37 overs) | | 290/8 (86 overs); Jacques Rudolph 61 (106); Matthew Hoggard 2/58 (19 overs) |

Match drawn
Kingsmead, Durban
Umpires: Darrell Hair (Aus) and Simon Taufel (Aus)
Player of the match: Jacques Kallis (SA)

- South Africa won the toss and elected to field.
- Bad light brought play to an early close on day 5 with 15 overs yet to play.

=== 3rd Test ===
2–6 January 2005
Scorecard

| South Africa | v | England |
| 441 (142.1 overs); Jacques Kallis 149 (334); Andrew Flintoff 4/79 (31.1 overs) | | 163 (58 overs); Andrew Strauss 45 (105); Charl Langeveldt 5/46 (16 overs) |
| 222/8d (69.3 overs); Jacques Kallis 66 (134); Simon Jones 2/15 (9.3 overs) | | 304 (123.4 overs); Steve Harmison 42 (42); Shaun Pollock 4/65 (31 overs) |

South Africa won by 196 runs
Newlands, Cape Town
Umpires: Steve Bucknor (WI) and Daryl Harper (Aus)
Player of the match: Jacques Kallis (SA)

- South Africa won the toss and elected to bat.
- Charl Langeveldt (SA) made his Test debut.

=== 4th Test ===
13–17 January 2005
Scorecard

| England | v | South Africa |
| 411/8d (124 overs); Andrew Strauss 147 (250); Makhaya Ntini 4/111 (34 overs) | | 419 (118.1 overs); Herschelle Gibbs 161 (307); Matthew Hoggard 5/144 (34 overs) |
| 332/9d (81.1 overs); Marcus Trescothick 180 (248); Makhaya Ntini 3/62 (20.1 overs) | | 247 (59.3 overs); Herschelle Gibbs 98 (132); Matthew Hoggard 7/61 (18.3 overs) |

England won by 77 runs
Wanderers Stadium, Johannesburg
Umpires: Aleem Dar (Pak) and Steve Bucknor (WI)
Player of the match: Matthew Hoggard (Eng)

- England won the toss and elected to bat.

=== 5th Test ===
21–25 January 2005
Scorecard

| South Africa | v | England |
| 247 (75.3 overs); AB de Villiers 92 (165); Andrew Flintoff 4/44 (19 overs) | | 359 (123 overs); Graham Thorpe 86 (269); André Nel 6/81 (29 overs) |
| 296/6d (73 overs); Jacques Kallis 136* (217); Andrew Flintoff 2/46 (13 overs) | | 73/4 (41.2 overs); Michael Vaughan 26* (86); Makhaya Ntini 3/12 (11 overs) |

Match drawn
SuperSport Park, Centurion
Umpires: Aleem Dar (Pak) and Steve Bucknor (WI)
Player of the match: AB de Villiers (SA)

- England won the toss and elected to field.

== ODI series ==
=== 1st ODI ===
30 January 2005
Scorecard

| South Africa; 175/9 (50 overs) | v | England; 103/3 (25.1 overs) |
| Shaun Pollock 37 (60); Ashley Giles 3/18 (7 overs) | | Michael Vaughan 44* (70); André Nel 1/13 (5 overs) |

England won by 26 runs (D/L method)
Wanderers Stadium, Johannesburg
Umpires: Steve Bucknor (WI) and Ian Howell (SA)
Player of the match: Michael Vaughan (Eng)

- England won the toss and elected to field.
- Rain interrupted the South Africa innings for 7 minutes after 35 overs, before ending the England innings after 25.1 overs.

=== 2nd ODI ===
2 February 2005 (D/N)
Scorecard

| England; 270/5 (50 overs) | v | South Africa; 270/8 (50 overs) |
| Kevin Pietersen 108* (96); Andrew Hall 1/50 (10 overs) | | Herschelle Gibbs 78 (101); Kabir Ali 3/56 (8 overs) |

Match tied
Goodyear Park, Bloemfontein
Umpires: Brian Jerling (SA) and Simon Taufel (Aus)
Player of the match: Kevin Pietersen (Eng)

- South Africa won the toss and elected to field.
- AB de Villiers (SA) made his ODI debut.

=== 3rd ODI ===
4 February 2005 (D/N)
Scorecard

| England; 267/8 (50 overs) | v | South Africa; 270/7 (49.1 overs) |
| Vikram Solanki 66 (87); André Nel 3/49 (10 overs) | | Graeme Smith 105 (131); Darren Gough 2/46 (9.1 overs) |

South Africa won by 3 wickets
St George's Park, Port Elizabeth
Umpires: Steve Bucknor (WI) and Brian Jerling (SA)
Player of the match: Graeme Smith (SA)

- England won the toss and elected to bat.

=== 4th ODI ===
6 February 2005
Scorecard

| South Africa; 291/5 (50 overs) | v | England; 183 (41.2 overs) |
| Herschelle Gibbs 100 (115); Darren Gough 1/53 (10 overs) | | Kevin Pietersen 75 (85); Makhaya Ntini 3/29 (9 overs) |

South Africa won by 108 runs
Newlands, Cape Town
Umpires: Ian Howell (SA) and Simon Taufel (Aus)
Player of the match: Herschelle Gibbs (SA)

- England won the toss and elected to field.

=== 5th ODI ===
9 February 2005 (D/N)
Scorecard

| South Africa; 311/7 (50 overs) | v | England; 304/8 (50 overs) |
| Graeme Smith 115* (131); Darren Gough 3/52 (10 overs) | | Kevin Pietersen 100* (69); Jacques Kallis 2/62 (10 overs) |

South Africa won by 7 runs
Buffalo Park, East London
Umpires: Steve Bucknor (WI) and Ian Howell (SA)
Player of the match: Justin Kemp (SA)

- South Africa won the toss and elected to bat.

=== 6th ODI ===
11 February 2005 (D/N)
Scorecard

| South Africa; 211 (46.3 overs) | v | England; 7/2 (3.4 overs) |
| Herschelle Gibbs 118 (133); Kabir Ali 3/44 (8.3 overs) | | Michael Vaughan 2* (6); Shaun Pollock 1/2 (2 overs) |

No result
Kingsmead, Durban
Umpires: Brian Jerling (SA) and Simon Taufel (Aus)

- South Africa won the toss and elected to bat.
- Rain reduced the South Africa innings to a maximum of 48 overs before ending the England innings after 3.4 overs.

=== 7th ODI ===
13 February 2005
Scorecard

| England; 240 (49.5 overs) | v | South Africa; 241/7 (49 overs) |
| Kevin Pietersen 116 (110); Andrew Hall 3/52 (9.5 overs) | | Ashwell Prince 62* (76); Alex Wharf 2/51 (10 overs) |

South Africa won by 3 wickets
SuperSport Park, Centurion
Umpires: Steve Bucknor (WI) and Brian Jerling (SA)
Player of the match: Kevin Pietersen (Eng)

- South Africa won the toss and elected to field.
