= England Lions cricket team =

Second-tier national team

Personnel
- Coach: Andrew Flintoff
- Owner: England and Wales Cricket Board (ECB)

Team information
- Founded: 1982
- Official website: Official Website

The England Lions (formerly England A) cricket team is England and Wales' "second-tier" team, below the full England cricket team. It is largely intended as a way for promising young cricketers to gain experience in international cricket.

== England B and England A ==
Although primarily intended as a touring team, for several years in the 1990s they played one match in England at the start of each season: between 1992 and 1995 against the previous season's county champion and in 1996 and 1997 against a Rest of England team. England A also played two List A games against the full Sri Lankan touring side in England in 1991.

Previously a second tier team known as "England B" played one game against the Pakistanis in 1982 and had made a full tour of Sri Lanka in 1985/86. The first full tour by a team named "England A" was to Zimbabwe in 1989/90, and consisted of three first-class matches and three 50-over games. On this occasion England A played against the full Zimbabwe side, but on subsequent tours their most important opponents have usually been the equivalent A teams of the countries they have been touring. However, England A has toured Australia but had played a match against their Australian A team counterparts until 2021.

They also often play matches against state or provincial sides, and in 2000/01 England A participated in the Busta Cup, the West Indian domestic first-class competition, finishing in third place out of the eight teams taking part. In 2003/04 England A took part in India's Duleep Trophy competition, but failed to progress beyond the group stages after losing both their matches. There were no England A matches played in the period between these two tours.

== England Lions ==
The newly rebranded England Lions was then integrated with the ECB National Academy, with touring parties taken from the Academy squad. On 15 June 2007, it was announced by the ECB (English & Welsh Cricket Board) the inaugural Lions side would play a one-day touring warm-up match against the West Indies at Worcester. Later in the summer against the touring Indians the Lions drew a 3-day match at Chelmsford and had a one-day match abandoned due to rain at Northampton.

On 4 January 2008 the squad for the England Lions tour of India was named, with Sussex batsman Michael Yardy named as captain. The team competed in the 2008 Duleep Trophy domestic first-class competition in addition to friendly matches.

On 7th September 2024, Andrew Flintoff was named England Lions head coach.

== Current squad ==
The following players were named in the squads for the Winter 2026 series against South Africa A.

The captain of the side typically varies from series to series. The current captains are Jordan Cox (first-class) Dan Mousley (limited overs).

| Name | Age | Batting style | Bowling style | County | S/N |
Batsmen
| Charlie Allison | 21 | Right-handed | Right-arm medium | Essex | 5 |
| Jordan Cox | 26 | Right-handed | Right-arm off-spin | Essex | 93 |
| Ben Geddes | 25 | Right-handed | Right-arm medium | Surrey | 72 |
| Ben McKinney | 22 | Left-handed | Right-arm off-spin | Durham | 40 |
| Asa Tribe | 22 | Right-handed | Right-arm off-spin | Glamorgan | 46 |
| James Wharton | 25 | Right-handed | Right-arm off-spin | Yorkshire | |
Wicket-keepers
| Ben Dawkins | 20 | Right-handed | — | Kent | |
| Ben Mayes | 18 | Right-handed | Right-arm medium | Hampshire | 71 |
| James Rew | 22 | Left-handed | — | Somerset | 89 |
| Thomas Rew | 18 | Right-handed | — | Somerset | 31 |
All-rounders
| Rehan Ahmed† | 22 | Right-handed | Leg break | Leicestershire | 53 |
| James Coles | 22 | Right-handed | Left-arm orthodox | Sussex | 84 |
| Scott Currie | 25 | Right-handed | Right-arm medium-fast | Hampshire | 44 |
| Caleb Falconer | 20 | Right-handed | Right-arm medium | Middlesex | 27 |
| Tom Lawes (cricketer) | 23 | Right-handed | Right-arm medium-fast | Surrey | 94 |
| Dan Mousley† | 25 | Left-handed | Right-arm off-spin | Warwickshire | 96 |
| Liam Patterson-White | 28 | Left-handed | Left-arm orthodox | Nottinghamshire | 70 |
| James Sales | 23 | Right-handed | Right-arm medium-fast | Northamptonshire | |
Pace bowlers
| Noah Cornwell | 22 | Left-handed | Left-arm medium-fast | Middlesex | |
| Henry Crocombe | 25 | Right-handed | Right-arm medium-fast | Sussex | 54 |
| Eddie Jack | 21 | Left-handed | Right-arm medium-fast | Hampshire | 68 |
| Saqib Mahmood† | 29 | Right-handed | Right-arm medium-fast | Lancashire | 25 |
| Alfie Ogborne | 23 | Right-handed | Left-arm medium-fast | Somerset | 91 |
| Matthew Potts† | 28 | Right-handed | Right-arm medium-fast | Durham | 35 |
| Naavya Sharma | 21 | Right-handed | Right-arm medium-fast | Middlesex | 48 |
| Ekansh Singh | 20 | Right-handed | Right-arm medium | Kent | 69 |
| Mitchell Stanley | 25 | Right-handed | Right-arm fast | Lancashire | 73 |
| Adam Finch | 26 | Right -Handed | Right-arm medium fast | Worcestershire | 62 |
Spin bowlers
| Mason Crane† | 29 | Right-handed | Leg break | Glamorgan | 4 |

† = has played senior international cricket for England.

== Results summary ==
=== Season-by-season ===
| Season | Country | First-class v. A team | | | Other first-class | | | List A v. A team | | | Other List A | | | Twenty20 v. A team | | | Other Twenty20 | | |
| Season | Country | W | D | L | W | D | L | W | L | T/NR | W | L | T/NR | W | L | T/NR | W | L | T/NR |
England B (1982–1985/86)
| 1982 | Pakistan | — | — | — | 0 | 1 | 0 | — | — | — | — | — | — | — | — | — | — | — | — |
| 1985/86 | Sri Lanka | — | — | — | 0 | 7 | 0 | — | — | — | 2 | 3 | 0 | — | — | — | — | — | — |
England A (1989/90–2006/07)
| 1989/90 | Zimbabwe | — | — | — | 1 | 2 | 0 | — | — | — | 3 | 0 | 0 | — | — | — | — | — | — |
| 1990/91 | Pakistan | — | — | — | 0 | 1 | 0 | — | — | — | 1 | 0 | 0 | — | — | — | — | — | — |
| 1990/91 | Sri Lanka | 0 | 3 | 0 | 1 | 0 | 0 | 1 | 4 | 0 | — | — | — | — | — | — | — | — | — |
| 1991 | England | — | — | — | — | — | — | — | — | — | 1 | 1 | 0 | — | — | — | — | — | — |
| 1991/92 | West Indies | 0 | 1 | 2 | 0 | 2 | 0 | — | — | — | 1 | 0 | 0 | — | — | — | — | — | — |
| 1992 | England | — | — | — | 0 | 1 | 0 | — | — | — | — | — | — | — | — | — | — | — | — |
| 1992/93 | Australia | — | — | — | 0 | 2 | 2 | — | — | — | 0 | 1 | 0 | — | — | — | — | — | — |
| 1993 | England | — | — | — | 0 | 0 | 1 | — | — | — | — | — | — | — | — | — | — | — | — |
| 1993/94 | South Africa | 0 | 1 | 0 | 4 | 2 | 1 | — | — | — | — | — | — | — | — | — | — | — | — |
| 1994 | England | — | — | — | 0 | 1 | 0 | — | — | — | — | — | — | — | — | — | — | — | — |
| 1994/95 | India | 3 | 0 | 0 | 1 | 1 | 0 | 2 | 1 | 0 | — | — | — | — | — | — | — | — | — |
| 1995 | England | — | — | — | 1 | 0 | 0 | — | — | — | — | — | — | — | — | — | — | — | — |
| 1995/96 | Pakistan | 1 | 2 | 0 | 2 | 1 | 0 | 2 | 1 | 0 | 2 | 0 | 0 | — | — | — | — | — | — |
| 1996 | England | — | — | — | 1 | 0 | 0 | — | — | — | — | — | — | — | — | — | — | — | — |
| 1996/97 | Australia | — | — | — | 2 | 1 | 0 | — | — | — | 2 | 0 | 1 | — | — | — | — | — | — |
| 1997 | England | — | — | — | 0 | 1 | 0 | — | — | — | — | — | — | — | — | — | — | — | — |
| 1997/98 | Kenya | — | — | — | 1 | 0 | 0 | — | — | — | 1 | 0 | 1 | — | — | — | — | — | — |
| 1997/98 | Sri Lanka | 2 | 1 | 0 | 1 | 1 | 0 | 0 | 3 | 0 | 0 | 0 | 1 | — | — | — | — | — | — |
| 1998/99 | Zimbabwe | 1 | 1 | 0 | 0 | 0 | 1 | 3 | 0 | 0 | 2 | 0 | 1 | — | — | — | — | — | — |
| 1998/99 | South Africa | — | — | — | 2 | 0 | 0 | — | — | — | — | — | — | — | — | — | — | — | — |
| 1999/2000 | Bangladesh | — | — | — | 0 | 2 | 0 | — | — | — | 1 | 0 | 0 | — | — | — | — | — | — |
| 1999/2000 | New Zealand | 1 | 1 | 0 | 2 | 1 | 0 | 2 | 0 | 1 | 2 | 0 | 0 | — | — | — | — | — | — |
| 2000/01 | West Indies | — | — | — | 3 | 4 | 1 | — | — | — | — | — | — | — | — | — | — | — | — |
| 2003/04 | India | — | — | — | 1 | 0 | 2 | 0 | 3 | 0 | 0 | 1 | 0 | — | — | — | — | — | — |
| 2004/05 | Sri Lanka | 1 | 0 | 1 | — | — | — | 1 | 3 | 0 | 1 | 0 | 0 | — | — | — | — | — | — |
| 2005/06 | West Indies | 0 | 1 | 1 | — | — | — | 2 | 3 | 0 | — | — | — | — | — | — | — | — | — |
| 2006/07 | Bangladesh | 1 | 1 | 0 | — | — | — | 2 | 1 | 0 | — | — | — | — | — | — | — | — | — |
England Lions (2007–present)
| 2007 | West Indies | — | — | — | — | — | — | — | — | — | 0 | 1 | 0 | — | — | — | — | — | — |
| 2007 | India | — | — | — | 0 | 1 | 0 | — | — | — | 0 | 1 | 0 | — | — | — | — | — | — |
| 2007/08 | India | — | — | — | 1 | 0 | 1 | — | — | — | — | — | — | — | — | — | — | — | — |
| 2008 | New Zealand | — | — | — | 0 | 1 | 0 | — | — | — | — | — | — | — | — | — | — | — | — |
| 2008 | South Africa | — | — | — | — | — | — | — | — | — | 1 | 1 | 0 | — | — | — | — | — | — |
| 2008/09 | New Zealand | 0 | 2 | 0 | — | — | — | 0 | 2 | 0 | — | — | — | 0 | 1 | 0 | — | — | — |
| 2009 | West Indies | — | — | — | 1 | 0 | 0 | — | — | — | — | — | — | — | — | — | — | — | — |
| 2009 | Australia | — | — | — | 0 | 1 | 0 | — | — | — | — | — | — | — | — | — | — | — | — |
| 2009/10 | Pakistan | — | — | — | — | — | — | 1 | 2 | 0 | — | — | — | 2 | 1 | 0 | — | — | — |
| 2009/10 | England | — | — | — | — | — | — | — | — | — | — | — | — | 1 | 0 | 0 | — | — | — |
| 2010 | Bangladesh | — | — | — | 1 | 0 | 0 | — | — | — | — | — | — | — | — | — | — | — | — |
| 2010 | West Indies | — | — | — | — | — | — | 2 | 0 | 0 | — | — | — | — | — | — | — | — | — |
| 2010 | India | — | — | — | — | — | — | 2 | 0 | 1 | — | — | — | — | — | — | — | — | — |
| 2010/11 | West Indies | — | — | — | 2 | 5 | 0 | — | — | — | — | — | — | — | — | — | — | — | — |
| 2011 | Sri Lanka | 0 | 1 | 0 | 0 | 0 | 1 | 2 | 1 | 0 | — | — | — | — | — | — | — | — | — |
| 2011/12 | Bangladesh | — | — | — | — | — | — | 2 | 3 | 0 | — | — | — | 1 | 1 | 0 | — | — | — |
| 2011/12 | Sri Lanka | — | — | — | — | — | — | 3 | 2 | 0 | — | — | — | — | — | — | — | — | — |
| 2012 | West Indies | — | — | — | 1 | 0 | 0 | — | — | — | — | — | — | — | — | — | — | — | — |
| 2012 | Australia | 0 | 2 | 0 | — | — | — | — | — | — | — | — | — | — | — | — | — | — | — |
| 2012–13 | Australia | — | — | — | — | — | — | 0 | 4 | 1 | 0 | 2 | 0 | — | — | — | — | — | — |
| 2013 | New Zealand | — | — | — | 0 | 1 | 0 | — | — | — | — | — | — | — | — | — | — | — | — |
| 2013 | Bangladesh | — | — | — | — | — | — | 2 | 1 | 0 | — | — | — | — | — | — | — | — | — |
| 2013/14 | Sri Lanka | 1 | 2 | 0 | 0 | 2 | 0 | — | — | — | — | — | — | — | — | — | — | — | — |
| 2014 | Sri Lanka | — | — | — | — | — | — | 2 | 0 | 0 | — | — | — | — | — | — | — | — | — |
| 2014 | New Zealand | — | — | — | — | — | — | 0 | 2 | 0 | — | — | — | — | — | — | — | — | — |
| 2014/15 | South Africa | 0 | 2 | 0 | 0 | 1 | 0 | 3 | 1 | 1 | — | — | — | — | — | — | — | — | — |
| 2015/16 | Pakistan | — | — | — | — | — | — | 2 | 3 | 0 | — | — | — | 3 | 2 | 0 | 1 | 0 | 0 |
| 2016 | Sri Lanka | — | — | — | — | — | — | 2 | 0 | 0 | — | — | — | — | — | — | — | — | — |
| 2016 | Pakistan | — | — | — | — | — | — | 2 | 0 | 0 | — | — | — | — | — | — | — | — | — |
| 2018 | West Indies | — | — | — | — | — | — | 2 | 0 | 0 | — | — | — | — | — | — | — | — | — |
| 2018 | India | — | — | — | — | — | — | 1 | 2 | 0 | — | — | — | — | — | — | — | — | — |
| 2018–19 | Pakistan | — | — | — | — | — | — | | | | | | | — | — | — | — | — | — |
| 2025–26 | Pakistan | — | — | — | — | — | — | 1 | 0 | 4 | | | | 3 | 0 | 0 | — | — | — |

=== Head-to-head ===
| Team | First-class | | | List A | | | Twenty20 | | |
| Team | W | D | L | W | L | T/NR | W | L | T/NR |
| Australians | 0 | 1 | 0 | — | — | — | — | — | — |
| Australia A | 0 | 2 | 0 | 0 | 4 | 1 | — | — | — |
| Bangladesh | 0 | 2 | 0 | 1 | 0 | 0 | — | — | — |
| Bangladesh A | 1 | 1 | 0 | 6 | 5 | 0 | 1 | 1 | 0 |
| Bangladeshis | 1 | 0 | 0 | — | — | — | — | — | — |
| Barbados | 0 | 2 | 0 | 1 | 0 | 0 | — | — | — |
| Border | 0 | 1 | 0 | — | — | — | — | — | — |
| Central Districts | 1 | 0 | 0 | — | — | — | — | — | — |
| Central Zone | 1 | 0 | 0 | — | — | — | — | — | — |
| Combined XI | 1 | 0 | 0 | — | — | — | — | — | — |
| Combined Campuses & Colleges | 0 | 1 | 0 | — | — | — | — | — | — |
| Eastern Province | 1 | 0 | 0 | — | — | — | — | — | — |
| East Zone | 0 | 0 | 1 | — | — | — | — | — | — |
| England | — | — | — | — | — | — | 1 | 0 | 0 |
| Essex | 0 | 1 | 1 | — | — | — | — | — | — |
| Gauteng XI | 1 | 1 | 0 | — | — | — | — | — | — |
| Guyana | 0 | 2 | 1 | — | — | — | — | — | — |
| India A | 3 | 0 | 0 | 4 | 4 | 1 | — | — | — |
| Indian Board President's XI | 0 | 1 | 0 | — | — | — | — | — | — |
| Indians | 0 | 1 | 0 | 0 | 0 | 1 | — | — | — |
| Indian Youth XI | 1 | 0 | 0 | — | — | — | — | — | — |
| Jamaica | 1 | 1 | 0 | — | — | — | — | — | — |
| Karachi | — | — | — | 0 | 1 | 0 | — | — | — |
| Karnataka | — | — | — | 0 | 1 | 0 | — | — | — |
| Kenya | 0 | 1 | 0 | 1 | 0 | 2 | — | — | — |
| Leeward Islands | 1 | 1 | 0 | — | — | — | — | — | — |
| Mashonaland | — | — | — | 1 | 0 | 1 | — | — | — |
| Middlesex | 0 | 1 | 0 | — | — | — | — | — | — |
| Natal | 0 | 0 | 1 | — | — | — | — | — | — |
| New South Wales | 0 | 0 | 1 | 1 | 0 | 1 | — | — | — |
| New Zealand A | 1 | 3 | 0 | 2 | 4 | 1 | 0 | 1 | 0 |
| New Zealand Academy | — | — | — | 2 | 0 | 0 | — | — | — |
| New Zealanders | 0 | 2 | 0 | — | — | — | — | — | — |
| Northern Transvaal | 1 | 0 | 0 | — | — | — | — | — | — |
| North Island | 0 | 1 | 0 | — | — | — | — | — | — |
| Orange Free State | 0 | 1 | 0 | — | — | — | — | — | — |
| Pakistan A | 1 | 2 | 0 | 3 | 5 | 0 | 5 | 3 | 0 |
| Pakistan Cricket Board XI | 1 | 0 | 0 | 2 | 0 | 0 | — | — | — |
| Pakistan Cricket Board Patron's XI | 0 | 1 | 0 | — | — | — | — | — | — |
| Pakistanis | 0 | 2 | 0 | — | — | — | — | — | — |
| Pakistan UGC | 0 | 1 | 0 | — | — | — | — | — | — |
| Queensland | 0 | 2 | 0 | — | — | — | — | — | — |
| The Rest | 1 | 1 | 0 | — | — | — | — | — | — |
| South Africa A | 0 | 3 | 0 | 3 | 1 | 1 | — | — | — |
| South African Board President's XI | 1 | 0 | 0 | — | — | — | — | — | — |
| South Africans | — | — | — | 1 | 1 | 0 | — | — | — |
| South Australia | 1 | 0 | 1 | 1 | 0 | 0 | — | — | — |
| Southern Districts XI | 1 | 0 | 0 | — | — | — | — | — | — |
| South Island | 1 | 0 | 0 | — | — | — | — | — | — |
| South Zone | 0 | 0 | 1 | — | — | — | — | — | — |
| Sri Lanka | 0 | 5 | 0 | 2 | 3 | 0 | — | — | — |
| Sri Lanka A | 4 | 7 | 1 | 9 | 11 | 0 | — | — | — |
| Sri Lanka Board President's XI | 1 | 1 | 0 | 0 | 1 | 0 | — | — | — |
| Sri Lanka Colts XI | 0 | 2 | 0 | — | — | — | — | — | — |
| Sri Lanka Cricket Combined XI | — | — | — | 1 | 0 | 0 | — | — | — |
| Sri Lanka Emerging Players | 0 | 2 | 0 | — | — | — | — | — | — |
| Sri Lankans | 1 | 0 | 1 | 1 | 1 | 0 | — | — | — |
| Tamil Nadu | 1 | 0 | 0 | — | — | — | — | — | — |
| Tasmania | 0 | 1 | 0 | 0 | 1 | 0 | — | — | — |
| Transvaal | 1 | 0 | 0 | — | — | — | — | — | — |
| Trinidad and Tobago | 0 | 3 | 0 | — | — | — | — | — | — |
| United Arab Emirates | — | — | — | — | — | — | 1 | 0 | 0 |
| Victoria | 1 | 0 | 0 | 0 | 2 | 0 | — | — | — |
| Warwickshire | 1 | 0 | 0 | — | — | — | — | — | — |
| Western Province | 1 | 0 | 0 | — | — | — | — | — | — |
| West Indians | 2 | 0 | 0 | 0 | 1 | 0 | — | — | — |
| West Indies A | 0 | 2 | 3 | 4 | 3 | 0 | — | — | — |
| West Indies B | 1 | 0 | 0 | — | — | — | — | — | — |
| West Zone | 0 | 0 | 1 | — | — | — | — | — | — |
| Windward Islands | 2 | 1 | 0 | — | — | — | — | — | — |
| Zimbabwe | 1 | 2 | 0 | 3 | 0 | 0 | — | — | — |
| Zimbabwe A | 1 | 1 | 0 | 3 | 0 | 0 | — | — | — |
| Zimbabwe Country Districts | — | — | — | 1 | 0 | 0 | — | — | — |
| Zimbabwe Cricket Academy | — | — | — | 0 | 0 | 1 | — | — | — |
| Zimbabwe CU President's XI | 0 | 1 | 0 | — | — | — | — | — | — |

Up to date as of 16 December 2015.

== See also ==
- National Cricket Performance Centre
