= England Lions cricket team against Pakistan A in the UAE in 2018–19 =

England Lions cricket team against Pakistan Shaheens in the UAE in 2018-19
	Pakistan Shaheens	England Lions
- Dates: 18 November – 2 December 2018
Captains	Mohammad Rizwan	Dominic Bess (FC); Alex Davies (LA)

Twenty20 International series
- Results: England Lions won the 2-match series 2–0
Most runs	Adil Amin (51)	Tom Kohler-Cadmore (51)
Most wickets	Mohammad Irfan (6)	Saqib Mahmood (4); Jamie Overton (4); Liam Livingstone (4)

FC series
- Result: Pakistan Shaheens won the 1 (4-day)-match series 1–0
Most runs	Abid Ali (124)	Sam Billings (112)
Most wickets	Shaheen Afridi (7)	James Porter (5); Mark Wood (5)

LA series
- Result: Pakistan Shaheens won the 5-match series 3–2
Most runs	Mohammad Rizwan (323)	Ollie Pope (189)
Most wickets	Waqas Maqsood (12)	Lewis Gregory (9)

The England Lions cricket team toured the United Arab Emirates in November–December 2018 to play one first-class match and seven limited overs matches against the Pakistan Shaheens cricket team.

Pakistan A team won the one-off first-class match by 4 wickets.

== Squads ==
First-class		List-A		Twenty20	
Pakistan A	England Lions	Pakistan A	England Lions	Pakistan A	England Lions
	Dominic Bess; Sam Billings; Joe Clarke; Nick Gubbins; Max Holden; Tom Kohler-Cadmore; Liam Livingstone; Craig Overton; Danny Briggs; Jamie Overton; ~~Matt Parkinson~~; James Porter; ~~Josh Tongue~~; Jason Roy; Amar Virdi; Mark Wood; Saqib Mahmood		Dominic Bess; Joe Clarke; Nick Gubbins; Alex Davies; Sam Hain; Max Holden; Tom Kohler-Cadmore; Danny Briggs; Liam Livingstone; Saqib Mahmood; Craig Overton; Jamie Overton; ~~Matt Parkinson~~; James Porter; Mark Wood		Dominic Bess; Joe Clarke; Nick Gubbins; Alex Davies; Sam Hain; Max Holden; Tom Kohler-Cadmore; Liam Livingstone; Saqib Mahmood; Craig Overton; Danny Briggs; Jamie Overton; ~~Matt Parkinson~~; James Porter; Mark Wood

Josh Tongue was ruled out of the FC series and eventually replaced by Saqib Mahmood in the Lion's squad. Ahead of the tour, Lion's Matt Parkinson was ruled out from the entire series due to fracture in his back. Danny Briggs was named as replacement for him.

== First-class series ==
=== Only Unofficial Test ===
18–21 November 2018
Scorecard

England Lions	v	Pakistan A
240 (69 overs); Sam Billings 74* (145); Mohammad Irfan 4/80 (25 overs)		195 (58.2 overs); Mohammad Rizwan 58 (71); Mark Wood 4/67 (17 overs)
266 (85.2 overs); Joe Clarke 107 (184); Shaheen Afridi 4/80 (24 overs)		314/6 (97.4 overs); Abid Ali 113 (279); Dominic Bess 3/110 (31 overs)

Pakistan A won by 4 wickets.
Sheikh Zayed Stadium Nursery 1, Abu Dhabi
Umpires: Asif Yaqoob and Rashid Riaz

- England Lions won the toss and elected to bat.
- Abid Ali (Pakistan A) scored his 16th first-class century.
- Joe Clarke (England Lions) scored his 14th first-class century.
- Pakistan A won the one-off first-class series by 1-0.

== List-A series ==
=== 1st Unofficial ODI ===
25 November 2018
11:30
Scorecard

Pakistan A 351/4 (50 overs)	v	England Lions; 164 (32.5 overs)
Shan Masood 161 (134); Lewis Gregory 3/79 (10 overs)		Liam Livingstone 35 (38); Amad Butt 4/29 (6 overs)

Pakistan A won by 187 runs.
ICC Academy, Dubai
Umpires: Asif Yaqoob and Rashid Riaz
Player of the match: Shan Masood (Pakistan A)

- England Lions won the toss and elected to field.

=== 2nd Unofficial ODI ===
27 November 2018
11:30
Scorecard

Pakistan A 289/7 (50 overs)	v	England Lions; 290/4 (47.1 overs)
Mohammad Saad 117 (129); Saqib Mahmood 3/59 (10 overs)		Alex Davies 76 (84); Khushdil Shah 1/16 (4 overs)

England Lions won by 6 wickets
ICC Academy, Dubai
Umpires: Asif Yaqoob and Rashid Riaz
Player of the match: Alex Davies (England Lions)

- Pakistan A won the toss and elected to bat.

=== 3rd Unofficial ODI ===
29 November 2018
11:30
Scorecard

England Lions; 245 (50 overs)	v	Pakistan A 223/9 (50 overs)
Ollie Pope 93* (109); Khushdil Shah 3/37 (10 overs)		Mohammad Rizwan 141* (154); Dominic Bess 3/35 (10 overs)

England Lions won by 22 runs
Sheikh Zayed Stadium Nursery 1, Abu Dhabi
Umpires: Asif Yaqoob and Shozab Raza

- England Lions won the toss and elected to bat.

=== 4th Unofficial ODI ===
2 December 2018
11:30
Scorecard

Pakistan A 335/4 (50 overs)	v	England Lions; 154 (31.4 overs)
Adil Amin 120* (87); Lewis Gregory 3/72 (10 overs)		Alex Davies 42 (62); Waqas Maqsood 5/32 (7.4 overs)

Pakistan A won by 181 runs
Sheikh Zayed Stadium Nursery 1, Abu Dhabi
Umpires: Shozab Raza and Rashid Riaz
Player of the match: Adil Amin (Pakistan A)

=== 5th Unofficial ODI ===
5 December 2018
11:30
Scorecard

England Lions; 169 (45.1 overs)	v	Pakistan A 170/3 (39.5 overs)
Joe Clarke 60* (101); Zohaib Khan 4/27 (10 overs)		Mohammad Saad 67* (113); Mark Wood 2/26 (10 overs)

Pakistan A won by 7 wickets
ICC Academy, Dubai
Umpires: Asif Yaqoob and Shozab Raza

- England Lions won the toss and elected to bat first

== T20 series ==
=== 1st T20 ===
7 December 2018
17:30 (D/N)
Scorecard

Pakistan A 131/8 (20 overs)	v	England Lions; 135/6 (19.2 overs)
Umaid Asif 40 (34); Saqib Mahmood 4/14 (3 overs)		Tom Kohler-Cadmore 33 (27); Mohammad Irfan 4/24 (4 overs)

England Lions won by 4 wickets
Sheikh Zayed Stadium Nursery 1, Abu Dhabi
Umpires: Asif Yaqoob and Shozab Raza

- England Lions won the toss and elected to field.

=== 2nd T20 ===
8 December 2018
17:30 (D/N)
Scorecard

Pakistan A 139/9 (20 overs)	v	England Lions; 145/6 (18.5 overs)
Shan Masood 42 (32); Jamie Overton 3/24 (4 overs); Liam Livingstone 3/24 (4 overs)		Liam Livingstone 35* (19); Mohammad Irfan 2/18 (4 overs)

England Lions won by 4 wickets
Sheikh Zayed Stadium Nursery 1, Abu Dhabi
Umpires: Asif Yaqoob and Shozab Raza

- Pakistan A won the toss and elected to bat first.
