= 2007–08 Duleep Trophy =

- Dates: 26 January 2008 – 22 February 2008
- Administrator: BCCI
- Cricket format: First-class cricket
- Tournament format(s): Round-robin and knockout
- Champions: North Zone (17th title)
- Participants: 6
- Matches: 7
- Most runs: Ajinkya Rahane (WZ) (451)
- Most wickets: V. R. V. Singh (NZ) (18)

The 2007–08 Duleep Trophy was the 47th season of the Duleep Trophy, a first-class cricket tournament contested by five zonal teams of India: Central Zone, East Zone, North Zone, South Zone and West Zone. In addition to these five teams, a guest team (England Lions) also featured in the tournament.

North Zone won the title, defeating West Zone in the final.

== Results ==
=== Group stage ===
Group A points table

Team	Matches	Won	Lost	Drawn (WF)	Drawn (LF)	No result	Points	Quotient
North Zone	2	2	0	0	0	0	10	2.433
East Zone	2	1	1	0	0	0	5	0.592
South Zone	2	0	2	0	0	0	0	0.752

Group B points table

Team	Matches	Won	Lost	Drawn (WF)	Drawn (LF)	No result	Points	Quotient
West Zone	2	1	0	1	0	0	8	1.503
England Lions	2	1	1	0	0	0	5	0.886
Central Zone	2	0	1	0	1	0	1	0.743

=== Final ===
19–22 February 2008
Scorecard

West Zone	v	North Zone
274 (68.2 overs); Ajinkya Rahane 91; V. R. V. Singh 5/91		340 (100 overs); Rajat Bhatia 84; Siddharth Trivedi 6/67
231 (60 overs); Yusuf Pathan 61; V. R. V. Singh 5/86		166/4 (58.1 overs); Shikhar Dhawan 94*; Siddharth Trivedi 2/42

North Zone won by 6 wickets
Wankhede Stadium, Mumbai

- North Zone won the toss and elected to field.
