= Millie Taylor =

English cricketer (born 2004)

Personal information
- Full name: Millicent Sarah Latham Taylor
- Born: 7 October 2004 (age 22); Eastbourne, East Sussex, England
- Batting: Right-handed
- Bowling: Slow left-arm unorthodox
- Role: All-rounder

Domestic team information
- Years: Team
- 2021–2024: Sussex
- 2025–present: Warwickshire
- 2025–2026: Birmingham Phoenix
- 2026-present: Trent Rockets

Career statistics
Competition	WLA	WT20
Matches	6	45
Runs scored	40	223
Batting average	10.00	14.86
100s/50s	0/0	0/0
Top score	17*	32
Balls bowled	276	692
Wickets	10	40
Bowling average	20.70	17.67
5 wickets in innings	0	0
10 wickets in match	0	0
Best bowling	4/32	3/13
Catches/stumpings	1/–	13/–
- Source: CricketArchive, 10 August 2025

Millicent Sarah Latham Taylor (born 7 October 2004) is an English cricketer who currently plays for Warwickshire and Birmingham Phoenix. She plays as a right-handed batter and Slow left-arm unorthodox bowler.

== Early life ==
Taylor attended Bede's School in Eastbourne alongside her twin sister, Mary, who has also played for Sussex and Birmingham Phoenix, while also representing Hampshire and the Southern Brave.

== Domestic career ==
Taylor made her county debut in 2021, for Sussex against Essex, taking 0/11 from her one over. That season in the Women's Twenty20 Cup, she scored 8 runs and took 3 wickets at an average of 15.66. She played four matches for the side in the 2022 Women's Twenty20 Cup. She took a further three wickets in the 2023 Women's Twenty20 Cup, before making her high score of 32 against Suffolk.

Taylor was named in the Southern Vipers Academy squad for 2021. She was again named in the Academy squad in 2022. She continued as a member of the academy until 2024, although did not make an appearance for the side. Ahead of the 2025 women's cricket reset, Taylor signed for Warwickshire. She made her debut in May 2025, against Devon, before taking 22 wickets in the 2025 Women's T20 Blast where she was the leading wicket taker. Her performances earned her selection for the Birmingham Phoenix for the 2025 The Hundred as a replacement player for Charis Pavely.
