= English cricket team in South Africa in 2026–27 =

International cricket tour

	South Africa	England
- Dates: 17 December 2026 – 15 January 2027
Captains		Joe Root (Tests)

Test series

One Day International series

The England cricket team are scheduled to South Africa in December 2026 to January 2027 to play three Test matches and three One Day Internationals (ODI). The Test series forms part of both teams' 2025-27 WTC cycle. In February 2026, the Cricket South Africa (CSA) confirmed the fixtures for the tour, as a part of the 2026 home international season.

== Squads ==
South Africa		England	
Tests	ODIs	Tests	ODIs
		Joe Root (c); Jofra Archer; Gus Atkinson; Sonny Baker; ~~Jacob Bethell~~; Harry Brook; Sam Cook; Jordan Cox (wk); Ben Duckett; Emilio Gay; Ben McKinney; Dan Lawrence; Liam Patterson-White; Ollie Robinson; Jamie Smith (wk); Josh Tongue	

On 17 November 2026, Jacob Bethell was ruled out of the Test series due to a reoccurrence of a knee injury. Later, he was replaced by Ben McKinney.

== Test series ==
=== 1st Test ===
17–21 December 2026
Scorecard

South Africa	v	England

Wanderers Stadium, Johannesburg

=== 2nd Test ===
26–30 December 2026
Scorecard

South Africa	v	England

Centurion Park, Centurion

=== 3rd Test ===
3–7 January 2027
Scorecard

South Africa	v	England

Newlands Cricket Ground, Cape Town

== ODI series ==
=== 1st ODI ===
10 January 2027
10:00
Scorecard

South Africa	v	England

Boland Park, Paarl

=== 2nd ODI ===
13 January 2027
13:30 (D/N)
Scorecard

South Africa	v	England

Mangaung Oval, Bloemfontein

=== 3rd ODI ===
15 January 2027
13:30 (D/N)
Scorecard

South Africa	v	England

Mangaung Oval, Bloemfontein
