= Harry Moore (cricketer) =

English cricketer (born 2007)

Personal information
- Full name: Harry John Moore
- Born: 26 April 2007 (age 19)
- Batting: Right-handed
- Bowling: Right-arm fast medium

Domestic team information
- Years: Team
- 2023–present: Derbyshire
- FC debut: 9 September 2024 Derbyshire v Northamptonshire
- List A debut: 18 August 2023 Derbyshire v Worcestershire

Career statistics
Competition	FC	LA
Matches	3	10
Runs scored	48	86
Batting average	16.00	21.50
100s/50s	0/0	0/0
Top score	32	40
Balls bowled	252	504
Wickets	6	12
Bowling average	23.83	37.16
5 wickets in innings	0	0
10 wickets in match	0	0
Best bowling	3/55	3/45
Catches/stumpings	0/–	4/–
- Source: Cricinfo, 29 September 2024

Harry John Moore (born 26 April 2007) is an English cricketer who plays for Derbyshire and England national under-19 cricket team. He is a right arm bowler and right-handed batter.

== Career ==
He made his List A debut for Derbyshire against Worcestershire in 2023 One-Day Cup on 18 August 2023.

In June 2024, he signed a professional contract for the first time by Derbyshire CCC. He made his first-class debut for Derbyshire against Northamptonshire in 2024 County Championship on 9 September 2024. Moore signed a three-year contract with Derbyshire in September 2024.
