= James Coles =

English cricketer (born 2004)

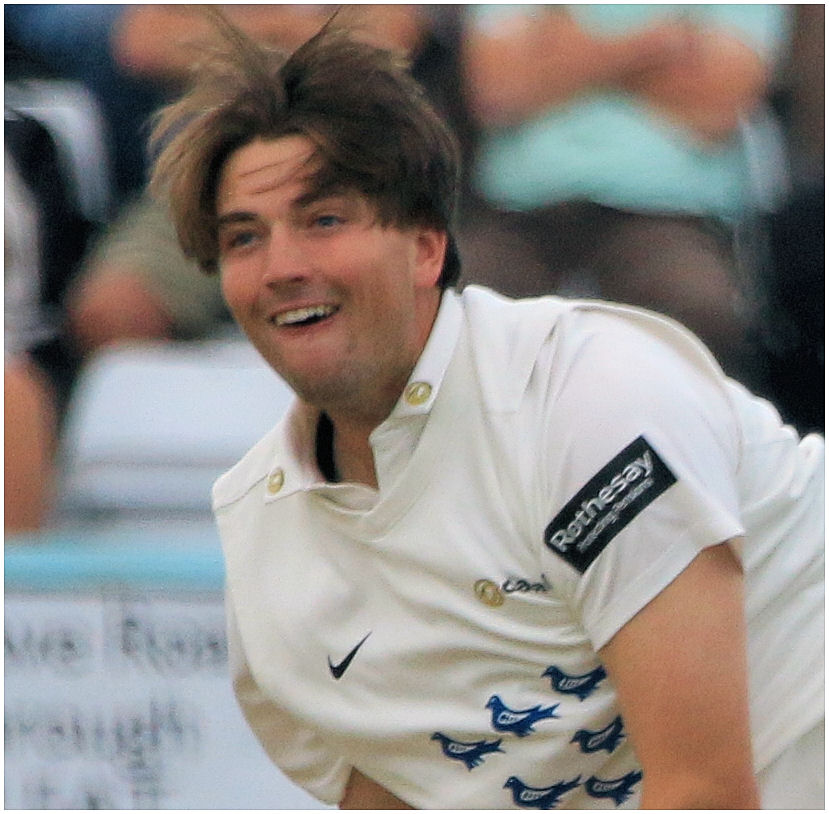
- Coles in 2025

Personal information
- Full name: James Matthew Coles
- Born: 2 April 2004 (age 22); Aylesbury, Buckinghamshire, England
- Batting: Right-handed
- Bowling: Slow left-arm orthodox

Domestic team information
- Years: Team
- 2020–present: Sussex (squad no. 30)
- 2024–2025: Southern Brave
- 2026: Sunrisers Eastern Cape
- 2026: London Spirit
- FC debut: 6 September 2020 Sussex v Surrey
- LA debut: 23 July 2021 Sussex v Lancashire

Career statistics
Competition	FC	LA	T20
Matches	63	26	81
Runs scored	3,614	459	1,490
Batting average	37.25	25.50	27.59
100s/50s	9/14	0/2	0/7
Top score	224*	63*	77*
Balls bowled	5,552	892	1,189
Wickets	84	26	60
Bowling average	41.00	33.42	27.50
5 wickets in innings	1	0	0
10 wickets in match	0	0	0
Best bowling	5/108	3/27	4/12
Catches/stumpings	54/–	13/–	42/–
- Source: Cricinfo, 17 November 2026

James Matthew Coles (born 2 April 2004) is an English cricketer who plays for Sussex. He made his first-class debut on 6 September 2020, for Sussex in the 2020 Bob Willis Trophy, at the age of 16, becoming Sussex's youngest ever debutant.

== Career ==
At the age of 12, Coles joined the Sussex academy, and he has represented them at the Bunbury Festival. He has also played for Aston Rowant in the Oxfordshire cricket league, and in 2020, he scored a century on his Oxfordshire debut against Buckinghamshire. At the age of 16 years and 157 days old, Coles became the youngest player to appear in a first-class match for the county. The record had been held by John Mare since 1870.

He has received the Oxford Junior Sportsman of the Year award and Sir John ‘Jack’ Hobbs Silver Jubilee Memorial Prize for the most outstanding under-16 schoolboy cricketer in England. He made his List A debut on 23 July 2021, for Sussex in the 2021 Royal London One-Day Cup.

In December 2021, he was named in England's team for the 2022 ICC Under-19 Cricket World Cup in the West Indies.

Coles was included in the England Lions squad to tour Australia in January 2025.

On 13 June 2026, Coles made his maiden first-class double century, scoring 224 not out off 226 balls in Sussex's first innings of their County Championship match against Glamorgan at Hove.

== Personal life ==
Coles was a pupil at Magdalen College School, Oxford, up until 2022.
