= Liam Patterson-White =

English cricketer (born 1998)

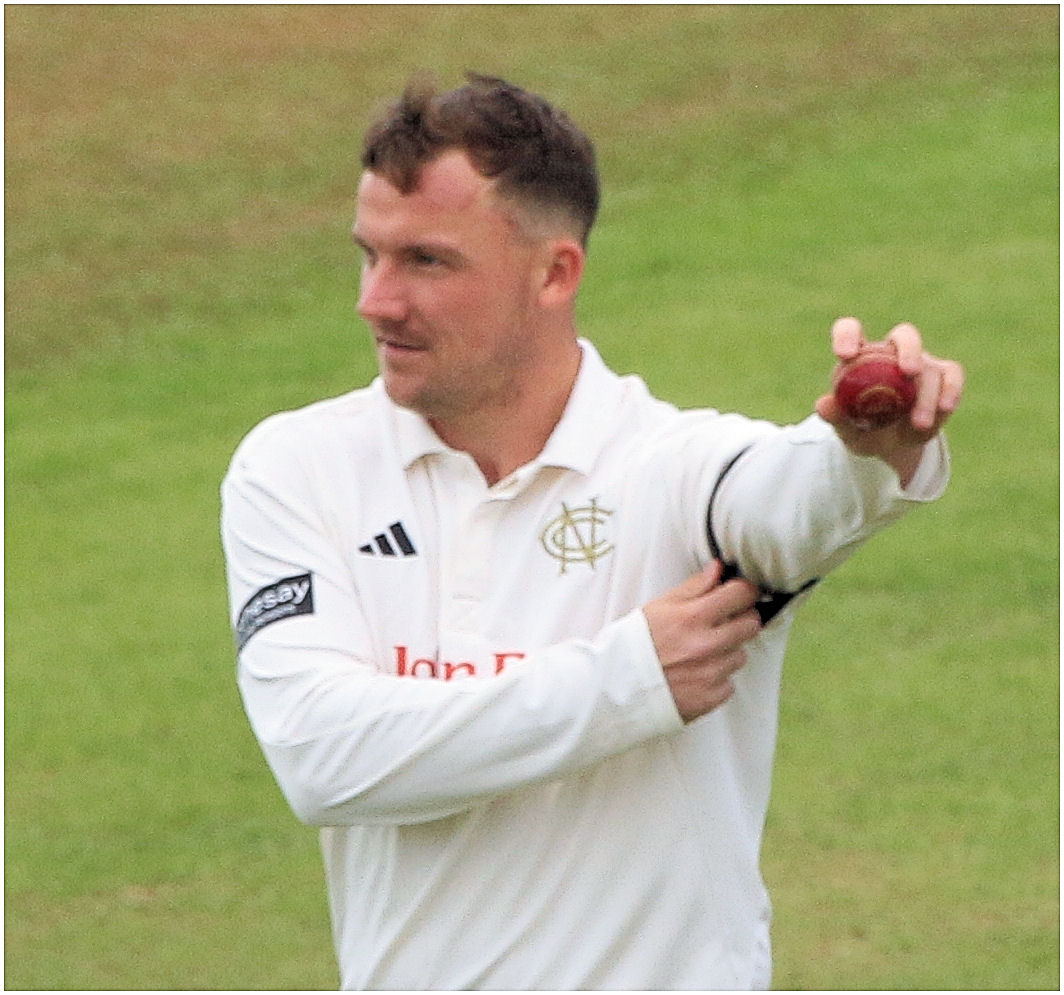
- Patterson-White in 2025

Personal information
- Full name: Liam Anthony Patterson-White
- Born: 8 November 1998 (age 28); Sunderland, Tyne and Wear, England
- Batting: Left-handed
- Bowling: Slow left-arm orthodox

Domestic team information
- Years: Team
- 2019–present: Nottinghamshire (squad no. 22)
- 2024: → Northamptonshire (on loan)
- 2025: Birmingham Phoenix
- 2026: Sunrisers Leeds
- First-class debut: 7 July 2019 Notts v Somerset
- List A debut: 25 July 2021 Nottinghamshire v Warwickshire

Career statistics
Competition	FC	LA	T20
Matches	75	33	42
Runs scored	2,409	523	330
Batting average	24.09	21.79	16.50
100s/50s	3/11	0/1	0/0
Top score	135	62*	44*
Balls bowled	13,055	1,513	654
Wickets	184	48	39
Bowling average	33.40	26.58	21.61
5 wickets in innings	8	2	0
10 wickets in match	0	0	0
Best bowling	6/43	5/19	3/13
Catches/stumpings	46/–	15/–	12/–
- Source: Cricinfo, 9 November 2026

Liam Anthony Patterson-White (born 8 November 1998) is an English cricketer. He plays for Nottinghamshire and has represented the England Lions.

== Career ==
Patterson-White made his first-class debut on 7 July 2019, for Nottinghamshire against Somerset. He took 5/73 in that match and went on to bag 16 wickets in three County Championship appearances leading to signing his first professional contract with Nottinghamshire in September 2019.

He made his List A debut on 25 July 2021, for Nottinghamshire in the 2021 Royal London One-Day Cup against Warwickshire. Patterson-White scored his maiden first class century in August 2021 against Somerset at Taunton.

He was the leading spin bowler in Division Two during the 2022 County Championship season, taking 41 wickets as Nottinghamshire won the title. Having scored 1,200 runs and taken 109 wickets across all formats since joining the club, Patterson-White signed a new four-year contract in November 2022.

He was part of an England Lions squad for a training camp in the United Arab Emirates at the end of 2022 and played for the team on their tour of Sri Lanka in early 2023. Patterson-White took seven wickets in two unofficial Test matches against Sri Lanka A during the trip.

In May 2024, Patterson-White had a one-match loan spell at Northamptonshire. Back at Nottinghamshire, on 9 June 2024, he made his T20 Blast against Lancashire at Trent Bridge, taking 1/21 off his four overs and scoring 44 not out from 21 balls.

Patterson-White made his second first class century against Hampshire in May 2025, scoring 135 in a County Championship match at Trent Bridge, including hitting 21 4s and two 6s.

He agreed a three-year contract extension with Nottinghamshire in July 2026, tying him into the club until at least the end of the 2029 season. In September 2026, he compiled his third first class century, making 111 not out against Leicestershire at Trent Bridge and shared in a 257 run stand with Jack Haynes which broke the 101 year old record for the highest sixth wicket partnership in a County Championship match between the two East Midlands teams.

In October 2026, Patterson-White was awarded a 12 month England development contract. He was also named in the England Lions squad to tour the Carribbean for a series of white-ball matches against West Indies A the following month.

On 9 November 2026, Patterson-White received his first England call-up with his inclusion in the squad for a three Test match series in South Africa starting the following month.
