= Ben McKinney =

English cricketer (born 2004)

Personal information
- Full name: Ben Stewart McKinney
- Born: 4 October 2004 (age 22); Sunderland, Tyne and Wear, England
- Height: 6 ft 7 in (201 cm)
- Batting: Left-handed
- Bowling: Right-arm off break
- Role: Opening batter

Domestic team information
- Years: Team
- 2023–present: Durham (squad no. 9)
- 2025: Manchester Originals (squad no. 77)
- 2026: Southern Brave (squad no. 7)
- FC debut: 6 April 2023 Durham v Sussex
- LA debut: 1 August 2023 Durham v Worcestershire

Career statistics
Competition	FC	LA	T20
Matches	40	21	36
Runs scored	2,389	753	525
Batting average	37.92	35.85	15.90
100s/50s	7/5	2/2	0/0
Top score	244	145	44
Catches/stumpings	31/–	11/–	21/–
- Source: Cricinfo, 17 November 2026

Ben Stewart McKinney (born 4 October 2004) is an English cricketer who plays for Durham County Cricket Club and is a former captain of the England under-19 cricket team. He is a left-handed batsman and a right-arm off break bowler.

== Early life ==
McKinney was a youth team footballer for Sunderland before focusing on cricket. McKinney attended Seaham High School and played for Seaham Harbour Cricket Club, playing age-group cricket for Durham from the under-11 age-group.

== Domestic career ==
McKinney made his debut in the County Championship against Sussex in April 2023, and made 35 in his first innings. He made his List A cricket debut for Durham on 1 August 2023, against Worcestershire. On 4 August 2023 it was announced that McKinney had signed a two-year professional contract with Durham. He scored a maiden century for Durham against Kent in the One-Day Cup on 11 August 2024. Later that month, he also scored his maiden first-class century against Notts. He subsequently agreed a further two-year contract with the club in January 2025.

On 11 April 2026, McKinney hit his highest first-class score of 244, achieved for Durham against Gloucestershire in the 2026 County Championship. In June 2026, he signed a new two-year contract with Durham tying him into the club until at least the end of the 2028 season. McKinney finished the County Championship third on the Division Two run-scoring charts, with 1,044 runs at an average of 52.20 as Durham secured promotion. He also played in The Hundred for the first time for Southern Brave.

== International career ==
McKinney captained the Young Lions and England national under-19 cricket team that toured Australia in the winter of 2022–23. They secured a first Youth Test victory in Australia since 2003 and McKinney scored a 45-ball 70 in England's second innings. In August 2023, he was announced as continuing in the captaincy of the England U19 team for the summer matches against Ireland and Australia. In October 2024, he was named in the England Lions squad for their tour of South Africa. Subsequently, McKinney was included in the England Lions squad to tour Australia in January 2025. He was also named in the England Lions squad for the 2026 series against South Africa A.

In October 2026, McKinney was named in the England Lions squad to tour the Carribbean for a series of white-ball matches against West Indies A the following month. Opening the batting in the second 50-over match between the teams, he scored 145 off 65 balls, including hitting 15 4s and 10 6s, in a 276-run win. The following month, he was called-up to the England test match squad for the 2026-27 tour of South Africa as an injury replacement for Jacob Bethell.
