= List of Hampshire County Cricket Club List A players =

Hampshire County Cricket Club was formed in 1864, and first appeared in the County Championship in 1895. They played their first List A match in the 1963 Gillette Cup against Derbyshire. The players in this list have all played at least one List A match for Hampshire. Hampshire cricketers who have not represented the county in List A cricket are excluded from the list. Hampshire play their matches at the Rose Bowl (also known as the Ageas Bowl)

Players are listed in order of appearance, where players made their debut in the same match, they are ordered by batting order. Players in bold have played only List A cricket for Hampshire.

== Key ==
**General**

- ♠ – Captain
- † – Wicket-keeper
- **First** – Year of debut for Hampshire
- **Last** – Year of latest match played for Hampshire
- **Mat** – Number of matches played for Hampshire

**Batting**

- **Inn** – Number of innings batted
- **NO** – Number of innings not out
- **Runs** – Runs scored in career
- **HS** – Highest score
- **100** – Centuries scored
- **50** – Half-centuries scored
- **Avg** – Runs scored per dismissal
- * – Batsman remained not out

**Bowling**

- **Balls** – Balls bowled in career
- **Wkt** – Wickets taken in career
- **BBI** – Best bowling in an innings
- **BBM** – Best bowling in a match
- **Ave** – Average runs per wicket

**Fielding**

- **Ca** – Catches taken
- **St** – Stumpings effected

== List of players ==
| No. | Name | Nationality | First | Last | Mat | Runs | HS | Avg | Balls | Wkt | BBI | Ave | Ca | St |
| No. | Name | Nationality | First | Last | Mat | Batting | | | Bowling | | | | Fielding | |
|---|---|---|---|---|---|---|---|---|---|---|---|---|---|---|
| 1 | Roy Marshall ♠ | Barbados | 1963 | 1972 | 75 | 2,190 | 140 | 32.20 | 0 | 0 | – | – | 16 | 0 |
| 2 | Jimmy Gray | England | 1963 | 1966 | 6 | 70 | 22 | 17.50 | 322 | 7 | 3/28 | 24.85 | 2 | 0 |
| 3 | Mike Barnard | England | 1963 | 1966 | 9 | 315 | 98 | 39.37 | 0 | 0 | – | – | 8 | 0 |
| 4 | Danny Livingstone † | England | 1963 | 1972 | 54 | 1,044 | 92 | 25.46 | 0 | 0 | – | – | 14 | 0 |
| 5 | Peter Sainsbury ♠ | England | 1963 | 1976 | 165 | 2,079 | 76 | 19.61 | 7,821 | 202 | 7/30 | 23.90 | 67 | 0 |
| 6 | Colin Ingleby-Mackenzie ♠† | England | 1963 | 1966 | 9 | 190 | 59* | 27.14 | 0 | 0 | – | – | 7 | 2 |
| 7 | Geoff Keith | England | 1963 | 1967 | 5 | 67 | 33 | 13.40 | 0 | 0 | – | – | 3 | 0 |
| 8 | Dennis Baldry | England | 1963 | 1963 | 1 | 7 | 7 | 7.00 | 90 | 4 | 4/70 | 17.50 | 0 | 0 |
| 9 | Henry Horton | England | 1963 | 1967 | 13 | 284 | 56 | 21.84 | 0 | 0 | – | – | 3 | 0 |
| 10 | Butch White | England | 1963 | 1971 | 52 | 264 | 28 | 10.56 | 2,750 | 90 | 5/31 | 18.74 | 10 | 0 |
| 11 | Alan Wassell | England | 1963 | 1966 | 4 | 17 | 11 | 8.50 | 306 | 8 | 3/70 | 27.37 | 2 | 0 |
| 12 | Derek Shackleton | England | 1964 | 1970 | 36 | 86 | 22 | 10.75 | 1,998 | 37 | 3/12 | 23.27 | 8 | 0 |
| 13 | Bob Cottam | England | 1964 | 1971 | 63 | 72 | 15* | 4.23 | 3,247 | 91 | 4/9 | 21.15 | 14 | 0 |
| 14 | Brian Timms † | England | 1965 | 1968 | 9 | 118 | 55 | 19.66 | 0 | 0 | – | – | 7 | 1 |
| 15 | Barry Reed | England | 1966 | 1972 | 32 | 900 | 143* | 36.00 | 0 | 0 | – | – | 5 | 0 |
| 16 | Alan Castell | England | 1966 | 1971 | 30 | 148 | 24 | 9.25 | 1,571 | 28 | 4/52 | 36.28 | 11 | 0 |
| 17 | Keith Wheatley | England | 1967 | 1970 | 10 | 53 | 17 | 5.30 | 0 | 0 | – | – | 1 | 0 |
| 18 | Richard Gilliat ♠ | England | 1968 | 1978 | 165 | 2,896 | 89 | 21.61 | 0 | 0 | – | – | 83 | 0 |
| 19 | Barry Richards ♠ | South Africa | 1968 | 1978 | 186 | 6,708 | 155* | 39.92 | 215 | 6 | 2/8 | 23.16 | 82 | 0 |
| 20 | David Turner | England | 1968 | 1989 | 377 | 9,835 | 123* | 30.44 | 17 | 0 | – | – | 91 | 0 |
| 21 | Trevor Jesty ♠ | England | 1969 | 1984 | 310 | 6,859 | 166* | 27.33 | 11,567 | 334 | 6/20 | 24.01 | 76 | 0 |
| 22 | Bob Stephenson ♠† | England | 1969 | 1980 | 237 | 1,111 | 32 | 9.91 | 0 | 0 | – | – | 191 | 58 |
| 23 | John Holder | England | 1969 | 1972 | 40 | 114 | 25 | 6.33 | 1,860 | 46 | 3/18 | 26.36 | 9 | 0 |
| 24 | Richard Lewis | England | 1969 | 1976 | 82 | 1,173 | 79 | 18.04 | 0 | 0 | – | – | 19 | 0 |
| 25 | Gordon Greenidge | Barbados | 1970 | 1987 | 274 | 9,801 | 177 | 38.43 | 196 | 1 | 1/36 | 151.00 | 110 | 0 |
| 26 | John Rice | England | 1971 | 1982 | 178 | 2,321 | 91 | 18.24 | 6,859 | 187 | 5/14 | – | 74 | 0 |
| 27 | Peter Haslop | England | 1971 | 1972 | 4 | 0 | 0* | 0.00 | 210 | 4 | 2/51 | 39.25 | 0 | 0 |
| 28 | Tom Mottram | England | 1971 | 1977 | 83 | 48 | 7* | 3.42 | 3,853 | 135 | 5/21 | 18.69 | 16 | 0 |
| 29 | Bob Herman | England | 1972 | 1976 | 94 | 157 | 22* | 4.90 | 4,371 | 137 | 5/24 | 21.03 | 16 | 0 |
| 30 | Larry Worrell | England | 1972 | 1972 | 1 | 0 | 0 | – | 0 | 0 | – | – | 0 | 0 |
| 31 | David O'Sullivan | New Zealand | 1971 | 1973 | 12 | 18 | 10 | 9.00 | 600 | 17 | 4/13 | 16.94 | 5 | 0 |
| 32 | Mike Taylor | England | 1973 | 1980 | 145 | 1,278 | 57* | 17.50 | 6,542 | 162 | 4/25 | 25.70 | 27 | 0 |
| 33 | Andy Murtagh | (Republic of Ireland) Ireland | 1973 | 1977 | 48 | 481 | 65* | 16.58 | 570 | 23 | 5/33 | 19.73 | 17 | 0 |
| 34 | Andy Roberts | (Antigua and Barbuda) Leeward Islands | 1974 | 1978 | 70 | 353 | 49* | 18.57 | 3,341 | 104 | 5/13 | 13.65 | 10 | 0 |
| 35 | Nigel Cowley | England | 1974 | 1989 | 288 | 2,913 | 74 | 17.13 | 10,870 | 233 | 5/24 | 31.94 | 66 | 0 |
| 36 | Michael Hill † | England | 1975 | 1976 | 4 | 20 | 11* | 20.00 | 0 | 0 | – | – | 2 | 1 |
| 37 | John Southern | England | 1975 | 1983 | 25 | 52 | 15* | 10.40 | 945 | 14 | 2/34 | 44.57 | 9 | 0 |
| 38 | Tim Tremlett | England | 1976 | 1991 | 202 | 730 | 43* | 12.80 | 9,060 | 252 | 5/28 | 24.60 | 37 | 0 |
| 39 | Peter Barrett | England | 1976 | 1976 | 1 | 28 | 28 | 28.00 | 0 | 0 | – | – | 0 | 0 |
| 40 | Richard Elms | England | 1977 | 1978 | 8 | 6 | 3* | – | 318 | 7 | 2/22 | 32.57 | 4 | 0 |
| 41 | David Rock | England | 1977 | 1979 | 18 | 286 | 68 | 19.06 | 0 | 0 | – | – | 7 | 0 |
| 42 | Nick Pocock ♠ | England | 1977 | 1984 | 105 | 1,346 | 73* | 21.36 | 18 | 0 | – | – | 42 | 0 |
| 43 | Keith Stevenson | England | 1978 | 1983 | 76 | 98 | 13 | 6.12 | 3,326 | 79 | 4/18 | 28.92 | 10 | 0 |
| 44 | Paul Terry | England | 1978 | 1996 | 304 | 8,622 | 165* | 34.35 | 0 | 0 | – | – | 145 | 0 |
| 45 | Malcolm Marshall ♠ | Barbados | 1979 | 1993 | 216 | 2,073 | 77 | 18.34 | 10,763 | 239 | 5/13 | 24.88 | 39 | 0 |
| 46 | Mark Nicholas ♠ | England | 1979 | 1995 | 346 | 6,983 | 108 | 27.60 | 3,578 | 93 | 4/30 | 32.36 | 109 | 0 |
| 47 | Shaun Graf | Australia | 1980 | 1980 | 12 | 49 | 25* | 9.80 | 552 | 17 | 3/24 | 18.23 | 1 | 0 |
| 48 | Chris Smith | England | 1980 | 1991 | 200 | 6,301 | 159 | 42.57 | 117 | 7 | 3/32 | 10.14 | 38 | 0 |
| 49 | Steve Malone | England | 1980 | 1984 | 65 | 48 | 16 | 4.80 | 3,009 | 99 | 5/34 | 22.07 | 6 | 0 |
| 50 | Bobby Parks † | England | 1980 | 1992 | 244 | 959 | 38* | 16.53 | 0 | 0 | – | – | 260 | 43 |
| 51 | Richard Hayward | England | 1981 | 1982 | 14 | 155 | 44* | 31.00 | 0 | 0 | – | – | 1 | 0 |
| 52 | Kevin Emery | England | 1982 | 1984 | 21 | 16 | 6* | 3.20 | 974 | 27 | 5/24 | 26.03 | 2 | 0 |
| 53 | Robin Smith ♠ | England | 1983 | 2003 | 347 | 12,034 | 158 | 42.97 | 27 | 3 | 2/13 | 5.33 | 127 | 0 |
| 54 | Jon Hardy | England | 1983 | 1985 | 21 | 192 | 58 | 17.45 | 0 | 0 | – | – | 5 | 0 |
| 55 | Elvis Reifer | Barbados | 1984 | 1984 | 16 | 69 | 14* | 8.62 | 767 | 19 | 4/46 | 28.73 | 2 | 0 |
| 56 | Steve Andrew | England | 1984 | 1989 | 36 | 6 | 4* | – | 1,779 | 37 | 5/24 | 33.21 | 5 | 0 |
| 57 | Rajesh Maru | England | 1984 | 1997 | 102 | 263 | 33* | 13.15 | 4,264 | 82 | 4/29 | 40.46 | 45 | 0 |
| 58 | Cardigan Connor | (Anguilla) Leeward Islands | 1984 | 1998 | 300 | 335 | 25 | 6.32 | 14,625 | 411 | 5/25 | 25.07 | 55 | 0 |
| 59 | Kevan James | England | 1985 | 1999 | 227 | 2,340 | 66 | 20.17 | 9,811 | 223 | 6/35 | 31.15 | 63 | 0 |
| 60 | Paul-Jan Bakker | Netherlands | 1986 | 1992 | 62 | 58 | 14 | 8.28 | 3,053 | 76 | 5/17 | 26.19 | 4 | 0 |
| 61 | Richard Scott | England | 1986 | 1990 | 38 | 976 | 116* | 29.57 | 250 | 6 | 2/8 | 37.83 | 7 | 0 |
| 62 | Adrian Aymes † | England | 1987 | 2001 | 221 | 2,210 | 73* | 23.26 | 0 | 0 | – | – | 215 | 53 |
| 63 | Jon Ayling | England | 1987 | 1993 | 94 | 1,028 | 56 | 22.84 | 4,413 | 93 | 4/37 | 35.91 | 18 | 0 |
| 64 | Stephen Jefferies | South Africa | 1988 | 1989 | 34 | 369 | 39 | 20.50 | 1,776 | 58 | 5/13 | 21.60 | 11 | 0 |
| 65 | Julian Wood | England | 1989 | 1993 | 42 | 792 | 92* | 23.29 | 0 | 0 | – | – | 9 | 0 |
| 66 | Tony Middleton | England | 1989 | 1994 | 61 | 2,139 | 98 | 39.61 | 0 | 0 | – | – | 18 | 0 |
| 67 | Shaun Udal ♠ | England | 1989 | 2007 | 356 | 2,503 | 78 | 15.84 | 16,273 | 407 | 5/43 | 29.41 | 119 | 0 |
| 68 | Kevin Shine | England | 1990 | 1993 | 13 | 3 | 2* | 3.00 | 629 | 15 | 4/68 | 37.26 | 1 | 0 |
| 69 | David Gower | England | 1990 | 1993 | 75 | 1,756 | 118* | 28.78 | 0 | 0 | – | – | 24 | 0 |
| 70 | Linden Joseph | Guyana | 1990 | 1990 | 1 | 0 | 0 | – | 66 | 0 | – | – | 0 | 0 |
| 71 | Rupert Cox | England | 1990 | 1994 | 15 | 83 | 23* | 8.30 | 0 | 0 | – | – | 5 | 0 |
| 72 | Aaqib Javed | Pakistan | 1991 | 1991 | 22 | 8 | 4* | 8.00 | 1,188 | 27 | 4/51 | 31.25 | 3 | 0 |
| 73 | Ian Turner | England | 1992 | 1993 | 17 | 3 | 2 | 1.50 | 754 | 16 | 3/58 | 34.25 | 3 | 0 |
| 74 | Sean Morris | England | 1992 | 1996 | 28 | 739 | 87 | 29.56 | 0 | 0 | – | – | 8 | 0 |
| 75 | Martin Jean-Jacques | England | 1993 | 1994 | 9 | 16 | 8 | 5.33 | 342 | 9 | 3/44 | 34.11 | 0 | 0 |
| 76 | Martin Thursfield | England | 1993 | 1996 | 31 | 58 | 19 | 6.44 | 1,386 | 23 | 3/31 | 48.91 | 5 | 0 |
| 77 | James Bovill | England | 1993 | 1997 | 18 | 16 | 7* | 4.00 | 684 | 16 | 4/44 | 40.31 | 2 | 0 |
| 78 | Jason Laney | England | 1993 | 2002 | 123 | 2,901 | 153 | 24.58 | 1,386 | 23 | 3/31 | 48.91 | 30 | 0 |
| 79 | Matthew Keech | England | 1994 | 1999 | 74 | 1,440 | 98 | 22.85 | 192 | 5 | 2/16 | 37.00 | 22 | 0 |
| 80 | Norman Cowans | England | 1994 | 1995 | 21 | 9 | 6* | 4.50 | 1,008 | 22 | 4/36 | 32.18 | 2 | 0 |
| 81 | Winston Benjamin | (Antigua and Barbuda) Leeward Islands | 1994 | 1996 | 27 | 534 | 104* | 31.41 | 899 | 24 | 3/19 | 25.58 | 11 | 0 |
| 82 | Giles White | England | 1994 | 2002 | 121 | 2,346 | 76 | 21.72 | 41 | 0 | – | – | 38 | 0 |
| 83 | Paul Whitaker | England | 1994 | 1998 | 54 | 757 | 97 | 17.60 | 692 | 18 | 3/44 | 31.88 | 12 | 0 |
| 84 | John Stephenson ♠ | England | 1995 | 2001 | 117 | 2,677 | 124* | 27.59 | 4,172 | 127 | 6/33 | 26.11 | 52 | 0 |
| 85 | Heath Streak | Zimbabwe | 1995 | 1995 | 21 | 186 | 32* | 23.25 | 996 | 33 | 4/56 | 26.60 | 3 | 0 |
| 86 | Stuart Milburn | England | 1996 | 1997 | 15 | 40 | 27 | 6.66 | 683 | 13 | 2/7 | 42.53 | 3 | 0 |
| 87 | William Kendall ♠ | England | 1996 | 2004 | 127 | 2,059 | 110* | 21.90 | 257 | 5 | 2/48 | 47.40 | 59 | 0 |
| 88 | Simon Renshaw | England | 1996 | 2000 | 49 | 220 | 27* | 16.92 | 2,093 | 62 | 6/25 | 28.08 | 4 | 0 |
| 89 | Liam Botham | England | 1996 | 1996 | 1 | 1 | 1 | 1.00 | 24 | 0 | – | – | 0 | 0 |
| 90 | Dimitri Mascarenhas ♠ | England | 1996 | 2013 | 237 | 3,984 | 79 | 24.59 | 9,999 | 285 | 5/27 | 25.22 | 60 | 0 |
| 91 | Matthew Hayden | Australia | 1997 | 1997 | 23 | 980 | 120* | 46.66 | 135 | 4 | 2/38 | 30.75 | 12 | 0 |
| 92 | Mark Garaway † | England | 1997 | 1999 | 2 | 11 | 7 | 5.50 | 0 | 0 | – | – | 1 | 0 |
| 93 | Lee Savident | Guernsey | 1997 | 2000 | 8 | 94 | 39 | 18.80 | 157 | 6 | 3/41 | 20.66 | 0 | 0 |
| 94 | Chetan Patel | England | 1997 | 1997 | 1 | 0 | 0 | – | 24 | 0 | – | – | 1 | 0 |
| 95 | Simon Francis | England | 1997 | 2000 | 12 | 25 | 8* | 8.33 | 440 | 6 | 2/28 | 49.00 | 2 | 0 |
| 96 | Peter Hartley | England | 1998 | 2000 | 50 | 156 | 32* | 13.00 | 2,303 | 73 | 5/20 | 21.56 | 6 | 0 |
| 97 | Nixon McLean | (Saint Vincent and the Grenadines) Windward Islands | 1998 | 1999 | 42 | 427 | 36 | 15.81 | 1,820 | 51 | 3/27 | 27.90 | 5 | 0 |
| 98 | Derek Kenway † | England | 1998 | 2005 | 109 | 2,597 | 120* | 26.23 | 17 | 1 | 1/16 | 16.00 | 60 | 7 |
| 99 | Alex Morris | England | 1998 | 2001 | 15 | 73 | 25* | 18.25 | 654 | 18 | 3/49 | 31.05 | 3 | 0 |
| 100 | Lawrence Prittipaul | England | 1999 | 2005 | 59 | 498 | 61 | 12.45 | 844 | 19 | 3/11 | 40.26 | 15 | 0 |
| 101 | Shane Warne ♠ | Australia | 2000 | 2007 | 71 | 568 | 48 | 10.92 | 3,430 | 120 | 6/42 | 19.72 | 28 | 0 |
| 102 | Alan Mullally | England | 2000 | 2005 | 86 | 155 | 13 | 6.45 | 4,180 | 96 | 4/30 | 28.35 | 12 | 0 |
| 103 | Chris Tremlett | England | 2000 | 2009 | 100 | 365 | 38* | 9.60 | 4,596 | 144 | 4/25 | 24.86 | 21 | 0 |
| 104 | Neil Johnson | England | 2001 | 2002 | 42 | 1,295 | 113* | 34.07 | 1,206 | 27 | 3/41 | 39.74 | 34 | 0 |
| 105 | Zac Morris | England | 2001 | 2001 | 4 | 7 | 7* | 7.00 | 186 | 3 | 3/31 | 43.00 | 1 | 0 |
| 106 | James Hamblin | England | 2001 | 2004 | 48 | 656 | 61 | 16.82 | 1,007 | 28 | 4/29 | 32.39 | 14 | 0 |
| 107 | John Francis | England | 2001 | 2003 | 27 | 818 | 103* | 40.90 | 0 | 0 | – | – | 4 | 0 |
| 108 | James Schofield | England | 2001 | 2001 | 1 | 0 | 0 | – | 36 | 1 | 1/22 | 22.00 | 0 | 0 |
| 109 | John Crawley ♠ | England | 2002 | 2009 | 102 | 3,208 | 113* | 36.04 | 0 | 0 | – | – | 37 | 0 |
| 110 | Nic Pothas ♠† | South Africa | 2002 | 2011 | 128 | 2,770 | 114* | 35.97 | 0 | 0 | – | – | 120 | 31 |
| 111 | James Tomlinson | England | 2002 | 2014 | 34 | 49 | 14 | 6.13 | 1,217 | 38 | 4/47 | 29.05 | 3 | 0 |
| 112 | James Adams ♠ | England | 2002 | 2018 | 123 | 4,032 | 131 | 39.52 | 79 | 1 | 1/34 | 105.00 | 51 | 0 |
| 113 | Iain Brunnschweiler † | England | 2002 | 2003 | 3 | 0 | 0 | 0.00 | 0 | 0 | – | – | 4 | 0 |
| 114 | Simon Katich | Australia | 2003 | 2012 | 42 | 1,227 | 106 | 38.34 | 273 | 7 | 2/25 | 38.86 | 26 | 0 |
| 115 | Wasim Akram | Pakistan | 2003 | 2003 | 9 | 49 | 38 | 16.33 | 442 | 10 | 3/17 | 27.80 | 0 | 0 |
| 116 | Ed Giddins | England | 2003 | 2003 | 5 | 0 | 0 | – | 235 | 6 | 4/33 | 34.50 | 1 | 0 |
| 117 | James Bruce | England | 2003 | 2007 | 30 | 76 | 19* | 15.20 | 1,232 | 44 | 4/18 | 22.18 | 9 | 0 |
| 118 | Chaminda Vaas | Sri Lanka | 2003 | 2003 | 8 | 35 | 28* | 17.50 | 399 | 9 | 2/24 | 31.55 | 2 | 0 |
| 119 | Michael Clarke | Australia | 2004 | 2004 | 12 | 298 | 68 | 27.09 | 174 | 6 | 2/17 | 21.50 | 6 | 0 |
| 120 | Billy Taylor | England | 2004 | 2009 | 65 | 65 | 10* | 5.90 | 2,829 | 73 | 4/26 | 29.58 | 14 | 0 |
| 121 | Shane Watson | Australia | 2004 | 2005 | 11 | 522 | 132 | 65.25 | 324 | 6 | 3/34 | 45.83 | 4 | 0 |
| 122 | **Michael Dighton** | Australia | 2004 | 2004 | 2 | 86 | 74 | 43.00 | 0 | 0 | – | – | 0 | 0 |
| 123 | Greg Lamb | Zimbabwe | 2004 | 2008 | 47 | 796 | 100* | 23.41 | 915 | 25 | 4/38 | 33.28 | 28 | 0 |
| 124 | Sean Ervine ♠ | Zimbabwe | 2005 | 2017/18 | 154 | 3,842 | 167* | 31.49 | 3,969 | 109 | 5/50 | 35.08 | 57 | 0 |
| 125 | Kevin Pietersen | England | 2005 | 2008 | 17 | 651 | 98 | 43.40 | 54 | 1 | 1/1 | 57.00 | 0 | 0 |
| 126 | Richard Logan | England | 2005 | 2006 | 7 | 31 | 28* | 31.00 | 191 | 4 | 3/37 | 47.25 | 5 | 0 |
| 127 | Craig McMillan | New Zealand | 2005 | 2005 | 5 | 132 | 49* | 33.00 | 36 | 0 | – | – | 0 | 0 |
| 128 | Kevin Latouf | England | 2005 | 2008 | 11 | 90 | 25 | 11.25 | 0 | 0 | – | – | 6 | 0 |
| 129 | Jono McLean | South Africa | 2005 | 2006 | 9 | 60 | 36 | 15.00 | 0 | 0 | – | – | 6 | 0 |
| 130 | Andy Bichel | Australia | 2005 | 2005 | 7 | 32 | 16 | 6.40 | 330 | 12 | 3/41 | 23.50 | 3 | 0 |
| 131 | Dominic Thornely | Australia | 2006 | 2006 | 16 | 485 | 107* | 44.09 | 207 | 6 | 3/17 | 35.50 | 3 | 0 |
| 132 | Michael Carberry | England | 2006 | 2017 | 111 | 3,519 | 150* | 38.67 | 264 | 7 | 3/37 | 34.42 | 39 | 0 |
| 133 | Chris Benham | England | 2006 | 2010 | 54 | 1,564 | 158 | 36.37 | 0 | 0 | – | – | 25 | 0 |
| 134 | Tom Burrows † | England | 2006 | 2009 | 9 | 50 | 25 | 12.50 | 0 | 0 | – | – | 8 | 2 |
| 135 | Mitchell Stokes | England | 2006 | 2007 | 5 | 53 | 36 | 13.25 | 24 | 0 | – | – | 2 | 0 |
| 136 | Michael Lumb | England | 2007 | 2010 | 53 | 1,958 | 108 | 39.16 | 0 | 0 | – | – | 23 | 0 |
| 137 | Stuart Clark | Australia | 2007 | 2007 | 7 | 2 | 1* | – | 392 | 21 | 6/27 | 11.38 | 1 | 0 |
| 138 | Daren Powell | Jamaica | 2007 | 2007 | 6 | 3 | 2 | 1.50 | 264 | 13 | 4/30 | 21.61 | 2 | 0 |
| 139 | Liam Dawson ♠ | England | 2007 | present | 128 | 3,091 | 142 | 35.52 | 4,685 | 122 | 7/15 | 31.47 | 64 | 0 |
| 140 | David Balcombe | England | 2008 | 2014 | 11 | 4 | 2 | 1.33 | 420 | 12 | 2/28 | 33.83 | 4 | 0 |
| 141 | Shane Bond | New Zealand | 2008 | 2008 | 3 | 0 | 0 | 0.00 | 108 | 4 | 3/11 | 17.00 | 0 | 0 |
| 142 | David Griffiths | England | 2008 | 2013 | 22 | 15 | 7 | – | 780 | 27 | 4/29 | 29.44 | 4 | 0 |
| 143 | Hamza Riazuddin | England | 2008 | 2013 | 27 | 88 | 23* | 11.00 | 1,038 | 19 | 3/37 | 46.47 | 8 | 0 |
| 144 | Imran Tahir | South Africa | 2008 | 2011 | 23 | 12 | 5 | 4.00 | 1,012 | 35 | 5/27 | 22.97 | 3 | 0 |
| 145 | Dominic Cork ♠ | England | 2009 | 2011 | 33 | 189 | 35* | 14.53 | 1,317 | 39 | 4/18 | 29.46 | 8 | 0 |
| 146 | Danny Briggs | England | 2009 | 2015 | 55 | 152 | 25 | 11.69 | 2,202 | 50 | 4/32 | 40.28 | 16 | 0 |
| 147 | James Vince ♠ | England | 2009 | 2019 | 91 | 3,787 | 190 | 46.75 | 96 | 1 | 1/19 | 91.00 | 41 | 0 |
| 148 | Neil McKenzie ♠ | South Africa | 2010 | 2013 | 32 | 912 | 88 | 36.48 | 0 | 0 | – | – | 9 | 0 |
| 149 | Kabir Ali | England | 2010 | 2012 | 8 | 59 | 32 | 19.67 | 270 | 11 | 3/39 | 26.82 | 5 | 0 |
| 150 | Rangana Herath | Sri Lanka | 2010 | 2010 | 5 | 6 | 6* | 6.00 | 186 | 5 | 2/28 | 34.00 | 3 | 0 |
| 151 | Chris Wood | England | 2010 | 2019 | 79 | 400 | 41 | 12.90 | 3,304 | 106 | 5/22 | 27.96 | 24 | 0 |
| 152 | Michael Bates † | England | 2010 | 2014 | 36 | 92 | 24* | 8.36 | 0 | 0 | – | – | 23 | 4 |
| 153 | Daniel Christian | Australia | 2010 | 2010 | 1 | 4 | 4* | – | 48 | 1 | 1/46 | 46.00 | 1 | 0 |
| 154 | Simon Jones | Wales | 2010 | 2011 | 6 | 1 | 1* | – | 265 | 9 | 4/52 | 27.33 | 0 | 0 |
| 155 | Benny Howell | England | 2010 | 2011 | 13 | 357 | 122 | 44.62 | 102 | 2 | 1/23 | 47.50 | 3 | 0 |
| 156 | Phillip Hughes | Australia | 2010 | 2010 | 2 | 33 | 32 | 16.50 | 0 | 0 | – | – | 1 | 0 |
| 157 | Johann Myburgh | South Africa | 2011 | 2011 | 3 | 81 | 64 | 27.00 | 16 | 0 | – | – | 0 | 0 |
| 158 | **Tim Ravenscroft** | Guernsey | 2011 | 2011 | 1 | 5 | 5 | 5.00 | 0 | 0 | – | – | 1 | 0 |
| 159 | Sean Terry | Ireland | 2012 | 2015 | 8 | 161 | 63 | 32.20 | 0 | 0 | – | – | 1 | 0 |
| 160 | Bilal Shafayat | England | 2012 | 2012 | 1 | 0 | 0 | – | 0 | 0 | – | – | 0 | 0 |
| 161 | George Bailey | Australia | 2013 | 2017 | 11 | 358 | 145* | 51.14 | 0 | 0 | – | – | 5 | 0 |
| 162 | Adam Wheater † | England | 2013 | 2016 | 30 | 796 | 135 | 34.60 | 0 | 0 | – | – | 13 | 8 |
| 163 | Sohail Tanvir | Pakistan | 2013 | 2013 | 6 | 14 | 11* | 14.00 | 283 | 17 | 4/29 | 12.18 | 0 | 0 |
| 164 | Michael Roberts | England | 2013 | 2013 | 4 | 83 | 35 | 27.66 | 0 | 0 | – | – | 2 | 0 |
| 165 | **Adam London** | England | 2013 | 2013 | 1 | 6 | 6 | 6.00 | 0 | 0 | – | – | 3 | 0 |
| 166 | **Josh Davey** | Scotland | 2013 | 2013 | 1 | 19 | 19 | 19.00 | 60 | 1 | 1/62 | 62.00 | 1 | 0 |
| 167 | Adam Rouse † | England | 2013 | 2013 | 1 | 7 | 7 | 7.00 | 0 | 0 | – | – | 0 | 1 |
| 168 | **Matt King** | England | 2013 | 2014 | 2 | 8 | 8 | 8.00 | 48 | 0 | – | – | 0 | 0 |
| 169 | **Jack Sheppard** | England | 2013 | 2013 | 1 | 0 | 0 | 0.00 | 54 | 2 | 2/49 | 24.50 | 0 | 0 |
| 170 | Brad Taylor | England | 2013 | 2019 | 18 | 355 | 69 | 35.50 | 852 | 15 | 4/26 | 44.06 | 7 | 0 |
| 171 | Glenn Maxwell | Australia | 2014 | 2014 | 2 | 181 | 146 | 90.50 | 18 | 0 | – | – | 4 | 0 |
| 172 | Will Smith | England | 2014 | 2016 | 21 | 651 | 84 | 38.29 | 288 | 4 | 1/17 | 69.75 | 6 | 0 |
| 173 | Matt Coles | England | 2014 | 2014 | 8 | 30 | 25 | 4.28 | 275 | 9 | 3/62 | 32.44 | 1 | 0 |
| 174 | Tom Alsop † | England | 2014 | 2021 | 44 | 1,458 | 130* | 35.56 | 0 | 0 | – | – | 27 | 5 |
| 175 | **Michael Porter** | England | 2014 | 2014 | 1 | 0 | 0 | – | 0 | 0 | – | – | 1 | 0 |
| 176 | Joe Gatting ♠ | England | 2014 | 2015 | 7 | 55 | 17 | 13.75 | 0 | 0 | – | – | 5 | 0 |
| 177 | **Ollie Robinson** | England | 2014 | 2014 | 1 | 0 | 0 | – | 24 | 0 | – | – | 0 | 0 |
| 178 | Ruel Brathwaite | Barbados | 2014 | 2014 | 1 | 0 | 0 | – | 6 | 0 | – | – | 0 | 0 |
| 179 | **Jake Foley** | England | 2014 | 2014 | 1 | 0 | 0 | – | 0 | 0 | – | – | 0 | 0 |
| 180 | **Tom Nugent** | England | 2014 | 2014 | 1 | 0 | 0 | – | 24 | 1 | 1/15 | 15.00 | 0 | 0 |
| 181 | **Tom Barber** | England | 2014 | 2014 | 2 | 0 | 0 | 0.00 | 48 | 2 | 2/22 | 25.00 | 0 | 0 |
| 182 | **Basil Akram** | England | 2014 | 2014 | 1 | 1 | 1 | 1.00 | 12 | 0 | – | – | 0 | 0 |
| 183 | Gareth Berg | Italy | 2015 | 2019 | 39 | 417 | 65 | 19.85 | 1,849 | 46 | 5/26 | 35.50 | 17 | 0 |
| 184 | Yasir Arafat | Pakistan | 2015 | 2015 | 6 | 31 | 21 | 31.00 | 224 | 5 | 3/56 | 44.00 | 1 | 0 |
| 185 | Mason Crane | England | 2015 | 2023 | 43 | 157 | 31 | 22.42 | 2,167 | 68 | 4/30 | 31.64 | 14 | 0 |
| 186 | Fidel Edwards | Barbados | 2015 | 2019 | 20 | 16 | 5 | 2.66 | 1,020 | 36 | 4/35 | 27.52 | 2 | 0 |
| 187 | Jackson Bird | Australia | 2015 | 2015 | 3 | 1 | 1* | – | 108 | 4 | 2/10 | 16.00 | 0 | 0 |
| 188 | Gareth Andrew | England | 2016 | 2016 | 8 | 152 | 70* | 30.40 | 285 | 7 | 2/32 | 45.00 | 3 | 0 |
| 189 | Ryan Stevenson | England | 2016 | 2016 | 3 | 0 | 0 | 0.00 | 120 | 2 | 1/28 | 71.00 | 0 | 0 |
| 190 | Lewis McManus † | England | 2016 | 2021 | 37 | 563 | 50 | 23.45 | 0 | 0 | – | – | 27 | 8 |
| 191 | Joe Weatherley | England | 2016 | present | 36 | 1,037 | 116* | 35.75 | 327 | 8 | 4/25 | 27.62 | 14 | 0 |
| 192 | Shahid Afridi | Pakistan | 2016 | 2016 | 1 | 4 | 4 | 4.00 | 60 | 0 | – | – | 1 | 0 |
| 193 | Tino Best | Barbados | 2016 | 2016 | 2 | 0 | 0* | – | 120 | 1 | 1/47 | 122.00 | 0 | 0 |
| 194 | Ryan McLaren | South Africa | 2016 | 2016 | 4 | 136 | 46* | 45.33 | 222 | 10 | 4/42 | 18.20 | 0 | 0 |
| 195 | Brad Wheal | Scotland | 2016 | 2025 | 34 | 98 | 18* | 9.80 | 1,489 | 49 | 5/47 | 29.18 | 7 | 0 |
| 196 | Ian Holland | United States | 2017 | 2023 | 25 | 253 | 63* | 23.00 | 1,188 | 37 | 5/35 | 23.21 | 7 | 0 |
| 197 | Reece Topley | England | 2017 | 2018 | 11 | 11 | 6* | – | 606 | 16 | 4/40 | 36.93 | 3 | 0 |
| 198 | Kyle Abbott ♠ | South Africa | 2017 | present | 45 | 311 | 56 | 19.43 | 2,275 | 63 | 5/43 | 30.07 | 10 | 0 |
| 199 | Rilee Rossouw | South Africa | 2017 | 2019 | 22 | 978 | 156 | 48.90 | 0 | 0 | – | – | 3 | 0 |
| 200 | Calvin Dickinson | England | 2017/18 | 2017/18 | 6 | 45 | 21 | 9.00 | 0 | 0 | – | – | 4 | 0 |
| 201 | Asher Hart | England | 2017/18 | 2017/18 | 5 | 58 | 21 | 11.60 | 144 | 3 | 2/34 | 48.00 | 2 | 0 |
| 202 | Felix Organ | England | 2017/18 | present | 44 | 719 | 79 | 25.67 | 1,666 | 24 | 3/39 | 59.16 | 18 | 0 |
| 203 | Hashim Amla | South Africa | 2018 | 2018 | 3 | 109 | 63 | 36.33 | 0 | 0 | – | – | 1 | 0 |
| 204 | Dale Steyn | South Africa | 2018 | 2018 | 3 | 8 | 6 | 8.00 | 156 | 3 | 1/34 | 56.66 | 1 | 0 |
| 205 | Sam Northeast ♠ | England | 2018 | 2019 | 12 | 413 | 105* | 51.62 | 0 | 0 | – | – | 6 | 0 |
| 206 | Aiden Markram | South Africa | 2019 | 2019 | 8 | 466 | 130 | 58.25 | 156 | 5 | 3/39 | 23.40 | 3 | 0 |
| 207 | Aneurin Donald | Wales | 2019 | 2023 | 26 | 707 | 115 | 30.73 | 0 | 0 | – | – | 14 | 0 |
| 208 | James Fuller | England | 2019 | present | 24 | 482 | 58* | 30.12 | 807 | 21 | 4/34 | 41.80 | 11 | 0 |
| 209 | Tom Prest | England | 2021 | present | 53 | 1,468 | 181 | 29.95 | 734 | 21 | 4/73 | 32.80 | 20 | 0 |
| 210 | Nick Gubbins ♠ | England | 2021 | present | 52 | 2,338 | 144* | 48.70 | 637 | 14 | 4/38 | 44.78 | 30 | 0 |
| 211 | Tom Scriven | England | 2021 | 2021 | 5 | 63 | 42 | 31.50 | 46 | 1 | 1/6 | 46.00 | 0 | 0 |
| 212 | Scott Currie | Scotland | 2021 | present | 24 | 252 | 61* | 28.00 | 1,029 | 45 | 5/34 | 22.40 | 19 | 0 |
| 213 | John Turner | England | 2021 | 2024 | 17 | 34 | 12 | 11.33 | 725 | 35 | 5/25 | 17.05 | 2 | 0 |
| 214 | Fletcha Middleton | England | 2021 | present | 42 | 1,224 | 100 | 32.21 | 0 | 0 | – | – | 19 | 0 |
| 215 | Ben Brown † | England | 2022 | present | 41 | 978 | 139* | 26.43 | 0 | 0 | – | – | 56 | 1 |
| 216 | Toby Albert | England | 2022 | present | 28 | 962 | 96* | 41.82 | 0 | 0 | – | – | 15 | 0 |
| 217 | Jack Campbell | England | 2022 | 2022 | 9 | 1 | 1* | 0.50 | 446 | 17 | 4/44 | 21.76 | 0 | 0 |
| 218 | Keith Barker | England | 2022 | 2025 | 11 | 79 | 38 | 13.16 | 588 | 20 | 3/25 | 23.50 | 1 | 0 |
| 219 | Dominic Kelly | England | 2022 | 2026 | 20 | 214 | 45 | 17.83 | 675 | 20 | 5/19 | 33.75 | 10 | 0 |
| 220 | **Joseph Eckland** | England | 2023 | 2024 | 10 | 141 | 72 | 20.14 | 0 | 0 | – | – | 6 | 0 |
| 221 | Eddie Jack | England | 2023 | present | 21 | 102 | 20 | 11.33 | 978 | 38 | 4/29 | 24.60 | 5 | 0 |
| 222 | Mohammad Abbas | Pakistan | 2024 | 2024 | 4 | 0 | 0* | – | 156 | 3 | 2/38 | 33.00 | 1 | 0 |
| 223 | Ali Orr | England | 2025 | 2026 | 19 | 823 | 131 | 43.31 | 0 | 0 | – | – | 8 | 0 |
| 224 | Tilak Varma | India | 2025 | 2025 | 3 | 54 | 54 | 18.00 | 30 | 1 | 1/17 | 17.00 | 3 | 0 |
| 225 | Ben Mayes † | England | 2025 | present | 13 | 341 | 109 | 37.88 | 0 | 0 | – | – | 17 | 1 |
| 226 | Andrew Neal | England | 2025 | present | 19 | 319 | 110 | 31.90 | 1,031 | 18 | 3/33 | 46.72 | 9 | 0 |
| 227 | Manny Lumsden | England | 2025 | present | 4 | 1 | 1* | – | 202 | 10 | 4/60 | 23.40 | 4 | 0 |
| 228 | **Brandon McMullen** | Scotland | 2025 | 2025 | 5 | 79 | 30 | 19.75 | 174 | 2 | 1/20 | 63.50 | 2 | 0 |
| 229 | Jake Lehmann ♠ | Australia | 2026 | present | 8 | 347 | 75 | 43.37 | 0 | 0 | – | – | 2 | 0 |
| 230 | **Ashutosh Sharma** | India | 2026 | 2026 | 7 | 56 | 16 | 8.00 | 240 | 14 | 5/51 | 15.92 | 2 | 0 |
| 231 | **Ollie Williams** | England | 2026 | 2026 | 6 | 13 | 11 | 13.00 | 311 | 6 | 2/83 | 59.00 | 5 | 0 |
| 232 | Harry Petrie | England | 2026 | 2026 | 3 | 1 | 1* | 1.00 | 132 | 3 | 2/30 | 43.33 | 2 | 0 |

== See also ==
- Hampshire County Cricket Club
- List of Hampshire County Cricket Club first-class players
- List of Hampshire County Cricket Club Twenty20 players
- List of international cricketers from Hampshire
