= Larry Worrell =

Barbadian cricketer

Personal information
- Full name: Lawrence Roosevelt Worrell
- Born: 28 August 1943 (age 83); Saint Thomas, Barbados
- Batting: Right-handed
- Bowling: Right-arm off break
- Relatives: Sir Frank Worrell (cousin)

Domestic team information
- Years: Team
- 1969: Dorset
- 1969–1972: Hampshire

Career statistics
Competition	First-class	List A
Matches	32	1
Runs scored	289	–
Batting average	11.56	–
100s/50s	–/1	–/–
Top score	50	–
Balls bowled	4,965	–
Wickets	65	–
Bowling average	32.55	–
5 wickets in innings	1	–
10 wickets in match	–	–
Best bowling	5/67	–
Catches/stumpings	21/–	–/–
- Source: Cricinfo, 24 December 2009

Lawrence 'Larry' Roosevelt Worrell (born 28 August 1943) is a Barbadian-born English former first-class cricketer.

Worrell was born in Barbados at Saint Thomas, and was educated on the island at Combermere School. He came to England to join the British Army, where he served in the Royal Corps of Signals during the 1960s. He played services cricket for the Corps of Signals, in addition to playing minor matches for the British Army cricket team. In 1969, he played minor counties cricket for Dorset, making four appearances in the Minor Counties Championship. In that same season, Worrell made his debut in first-class cricket for Hampshire against the touring New Zealanders at Southampton, but did not play for Hampshire again until 1971. An off break bowler, when Worrell played for Hampshire they were looking for a spin-bowler to replace the likes of Mervyn Burden, Alan Wassell, Keith Wheatley, and Alan Castell (who had converted to seam bowling). He made his debut in the County Championship against Nottinghamshire in 1971, and played regularly for the county during 1971 and the first half of the 1972 season. Worrell made a total of 32 first-class appearances for Hampshire, taking 65 wickets at an average of 32.55; he took one five wicket haul, with figures of 5 for 67 against Leicestershire in 1971. As a lower order batsman, he scored 289 runs at a batting average of 11.56, making one half century. Worrell was utilised by Hampshire almost exclusively in first-class cricket, but did make a solitary List A one-day appearance against Lancashire at Old Trafford in the 1972 John Player League. Although his final first-class appearance came in 1972, he remained in the Hampshire squad for the 1973 season, but New Zealand spinner David O'Sullivan was preferred over him, with O'Sullivan helping Hampshire to their first County Championship since 1961. He was released by Hampshire at the end of the 1973 season. His cousin was the former West Indian Test captain Sir Frank Worrell.
