= Combermere School =

First level school in Barbados, founded 1695

Coordinates: 13°07′00″N 59°36′08″W

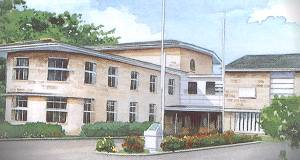

Information
- Former name: Drax Parish School
- Established: 1695; 331 years ago
- Founder: Colonel Henry Drax
- Staff: c. 70

Combermere School is a school in Barbados, one of the oldest schools in the Caribbean, established in 1695. Its alumni include several leading cricketers, David Thompson, sixth prime minister of Barbados and other politicians, several authors, the singer Rihanna, and Wilfred Wood, first black bishop in the Church of England. In its first 75 years, the school "provided the Barbadian community with the vast bulk of its business leaders and civil servants" and it is "perhaps the first school anywhere to offer secondary education to black children".

== History ==
The school was established in 1695 as the Drax Parish School, under the 1682 will of plantation owner Colonel Henry Drax (great-uncle of the Whig politician Henry Drax), who had left 2000 pounds sterling for the establishment and endowment of a "free school or Colledge" "to continue forever". The executors not having acted in a timely manner, the parish authorities eventually did. The oldest secondary school on Barbados and one of the oldest schools in the Caribbean, it underwent several name changes and relocations before settling within the Parish of St Michael, at Waterford, on the outskirts of the capital of Barbados, Bridgetown, in 1819.

The school, named after a colonial governor of Barbados, Stapleton Cotton, 1st Viscount Combermere, bears tribute to some of the school forefathers through the naming of areas such as the Drax Square, the De Vere Moore Gardens, and the Major Noot Hall. It was the first school to offer secondary education to poorer coloured students on the island. Having started as a co-educational institution, it returned to a mixed approach in the 1970s, eventually reaching a gender ratio of around 50%.

In 1995, Barbados issued a set of postage stamps commemorating the school's 300 years.

In 2016, the school was closed due to environmental concerns. The remediation efforts were slowed by alleged sabotage, but the school eventually reopened in 2017.

== Staff and structure ==
Combermere is led by a principal, assisted by a deputy principal; there are also six year heads for first form through to the upper sixth. There are over 70 staff in total, including a guidance counsellor.

=== Departments and subjects ===
The school has 12 departments, each headed by a senior teacher. The departments are: chemistry, mathematics, geography/social studies and environmental science, physics, biology and home economics, English, music and fine arts, physical education, technical and vocational studies, history, foreign languages, and business studies. There are dedicated labs and rooms for chemistry, biology, geography, physics, languages, music, computer science, and food and nutrition. The school has a pavilion equipped with a gym and changing rooms. There are two playing fields, a cricket pitch, shooting range, basketball/netball and tennis/volleyball courts. Also included on the premises are a library and an auditorium — the Major Noott Hall — and it is one of the few secondary schools on Barbados, if not the only one, with a meteorological station.

Combermere offers a music programme. It is also home to the Number 3 Cadet Company.

== Alumni ==
- Carlos Brathwaite – West Indian cricketer, unrelated to Kraigg
- Kraigg Brathwaite – West Indian cricketer, unrelated to Carlos
- Ron Buckmire – mathematician and LGBT activist
- Austin Clarke – Commonwealth award-winning author
- Frank Collymore – author, editor, and artist
- Sir Wesley Winfield Hall – former Barbadian, West Indian cricketer, Chairman of the West Indies Board of Control, Minister for Sports and Tourism
- John Holder – cricketer and umpire
- Kerryann Ifill – first blind graduate of the University of the West Indies, President of the Senate of Barbados from 2012 to 2018
- Chris Jordan – English cricketer
- Anthony Kellman – poet, novelist and musician
- George Lamming – author and public intellectual
- Frank Marshall – former Anglican Dean of Barbados, based at the Cathedral Church of Saint Michael and All Angels
- Rihanna (Robyn Rihanna Fenty) – recording artist
- Keith A. P. Sandiford – social historian
- Owen Alik Shahadah – African historian, filmmaker - 500 Years Later
- Charles Skeete – economist and former Ambassador to the United States (1981–1983)
- Arturo Tappin – saxophonist
- The Hon. David J. H Thompson – sixth Prime Minister of Barbados
- Sir Clyde Walcott, KA, GCM – former West Indies cricketer, former chairman of the International Cricket Council
- Arden Warner, particle physicist, inventor and Barbadian Golden Jubilee awardee
- Jomel Warrican – West Indian cricketer
- Sir Frank Worrell – West Indies batsman and captain
- Larry Worrell – cricketer
- Right Excellent Errol Barrow, PC, QC, LLD – First Prime Minister of Barbados

== See also ==
- Lord Combermere
- List of schools in Barbados
- Education in Barbados
