= Fionn Ferreira =

Irish inventor, student of chemistry

Fionn Miguel Eckardt Ferreira
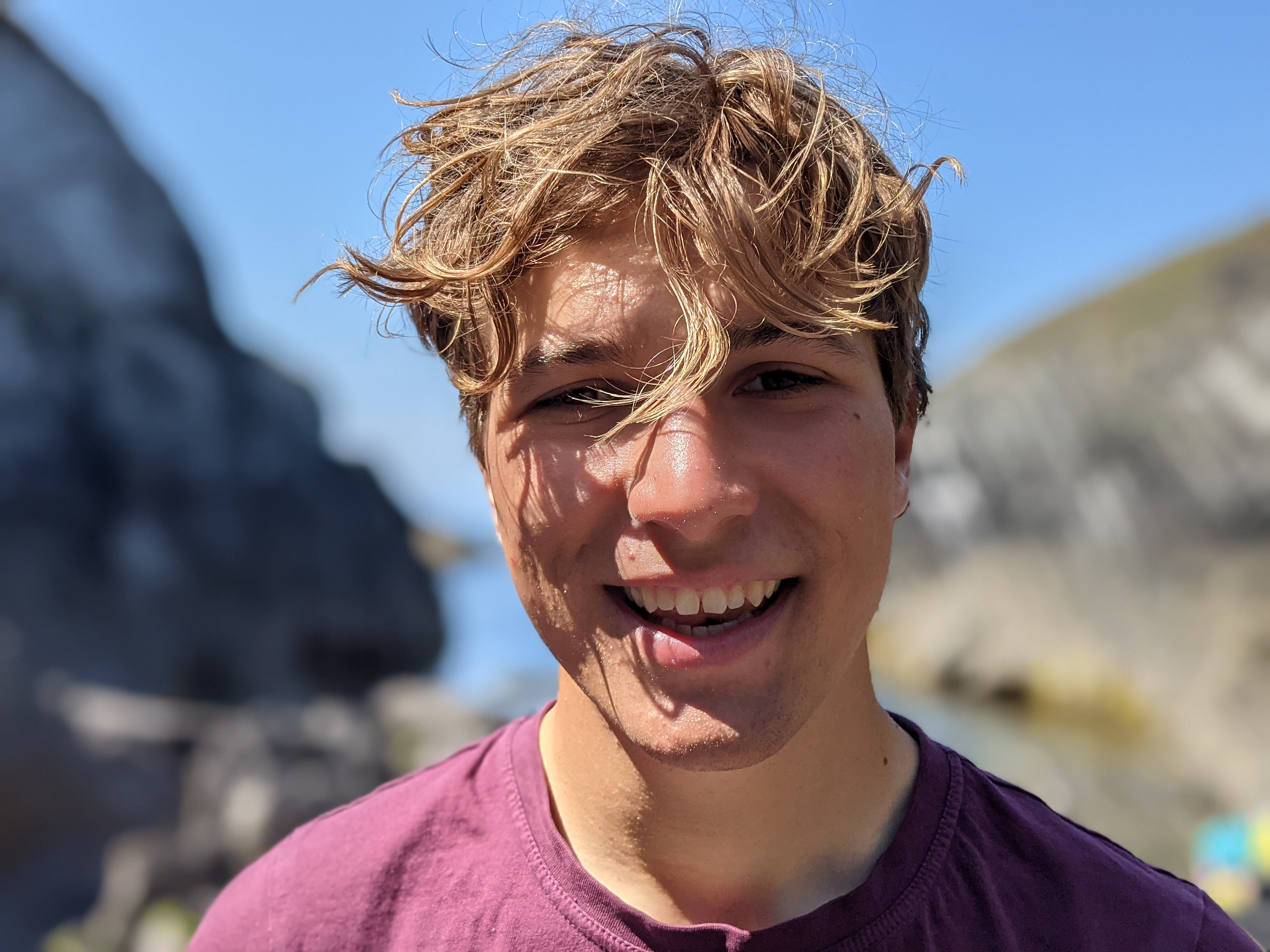
- Ferreira in July 2021
- Born: 2000 or 2001 (age 25–26); Ballydehob, Ireland
- Known for: research in solid-state NMR, and scientific work on microplastics remediation.
- Scientific career
- Fields: Chemistry
- Workplaces: ETH Zurich University of Groningen University Centre in Svalbard
- Doctoral advisor: Alexander Barnes
- Website: https://www.fionnferreira.com/

Fionn Miguel Eckardt Ferreira, from Ballydehob, County Cork, Ireland, is an Irish inventor, chemistry student and Forbes 30 under 30 listee. He is known for his invention of a method to remove microplastic particles from water using a natural ferrofluid mixture.

== Early life ==
Fionn Ferreira, whose full name is Fionn Miguel Eckardt Ferreira, was born in Cork to boatbuilder and modeller Anne Eckardt, from Germany and West Cork, and boatbuilder Rui Ferreira from Portugal, who had met in the UK in 1994 and settled in Ballydehob, County Cork. He was brought up in Ballydehob and attended St James' primary school in Durrus and subsequently Schull Community College in Schull, completing school at the age of 18 in 2019.

Ferreira spent part of his childhood kayaking around remote coastal areas of Ireland with his dog India, noticing an increasing amount of plastic washing up on the coastline. He created a methodology to quantify and collect plastic pollution, with a focus on microplastics. He built several inventions using LEGO, bits of wood and some microcontrollers to test for these microplastics. He entered the national science fair, the BT Young Scientist and Technology Exhibition, three times, with two of his projects being Let Sanils do the cleaning, An investigation into the antioxidant concentration of different berries using the Briggs-Rauscher reaction in conjunction with a photometer and An investigation into the removal of microplastics from water using ferrofluids. Ferreira worked as a curator at Schull's planetarium.

== Microplastic removal technology ==
Ferreira is best known for inventing a novel method to remove microplastics from water using magnetism. The technology, which he began developing as a teenager in rural Ireland, involves the use of a magnetic ferrofluid that binds to microplastic particles, allowing them to be extracted from water using a standard magnet. Ferreira stated that the idea was inspired by a 2014 article by Fermilab physicist Arden Warner, who developed a magnetic approach for oil spill remediation.

After hundreds of experiments and refinements, Ferreira developed a working prototype with microplastic extraction rates of up to 87% (+/- 1.1%), with the highest efficiency recorded for polyester-based particles. His approach specifically targets microplastics that conventional filtration systems struggle to remove, particularly very small particles.

He first exhibited the project at the 2018 Young Scientist and Technology Exhibition in Ireland, where he received the Intel Award, Best in Category, the Intellectual Ventures Award, and a first-place prize.

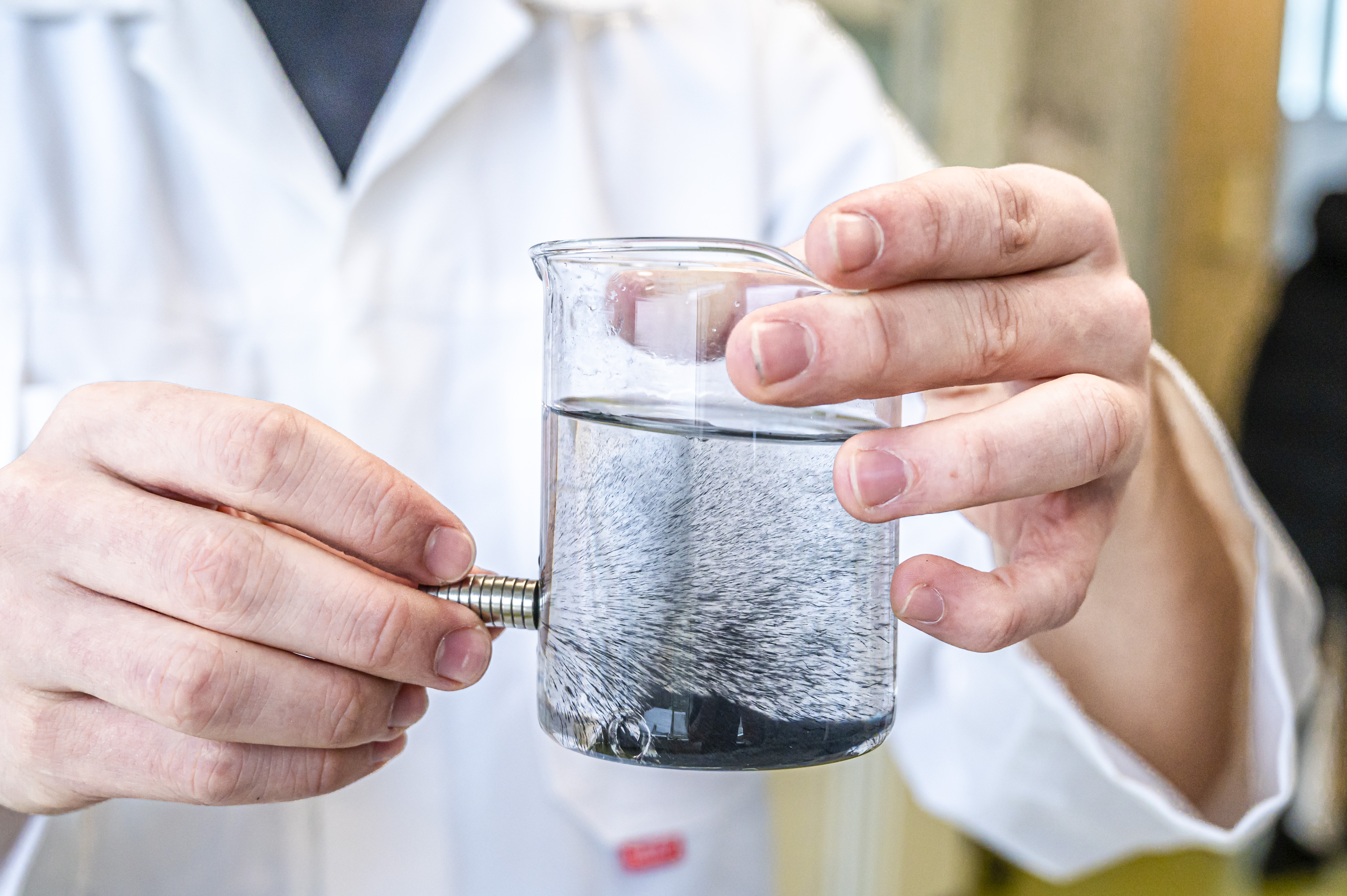
Fionn Ferreira performing his microplastic removal method.

Later that year, he competed at the Intel International Science and Engineering Fair (ISEF) 2018, receiving the 1st place American Chemical Society award, 2nd place in Chemistry, and additional honors.

In 2019, Ferreira showcased an improved version at the Google Science Fair, winning the Grand Prize of $50,000 for his innovation. Subsequently, Ferreira co-founded Fionn & Co., collaborating with the Green Journey Coalition to scale up the technology. Together, they developed a continuous flow prototype capable of processing contaminated water in real time, a critical advancement toward industrial and municipal deployment. Unlike earlier batch methods, this system operates continuously, making it more efficient and suitable for integration into wastewater treatment plants.

As of 2025, Fionn & Co. and the Green Journey Coalition were actively raising funds to develop a full-scale commercial prototype. Their goal is to deploy the technology globally, targeting both municipal wastewater facilities and coastal remediation projects. Since his employment as a PhD candidate, he has stepped back from the ventures remaining an advisor, to focus on his PhD.

Ferreira has emphasized that the focus is not just on extraction efficiency but also on sustainability, ensuring the system uses minimal energy, is made from recycled materials where possible, and can be deployed globally at accessible cost.

== Education ==
In autumn 2019, Ferreira began a BSc in Chemistry at the University of Groningen in the Netherlands and graduated in 2022 with Cum Laude honors.

He later pursued an MSc in Chemistry at the University of Groningen. As part of his master's studies, Ferreira conducted a research project in the molecular inorganic chemistry group of Professor Edwin Otten, focusing NMR for organic Redox Flow Batteries. In 2023, he participated in a field-based project in Arctic chemical oceanography at the University Centre in Svalbard (UNIS), investigating the biogeochemical processes influencing plastic degradation and pollutant transport in polar marine environments.

In 2025, Ferreira began a second MSc research project at ETH Zurich, working in the laboratory of Professor Alexander Barnes. His work focuses on the development of high-temperature superconducting (HTS) magnets for nuclear magnetic resonance (NMR), with an emphasis on sustainable instrumentation and improving energy efficiency in scientific research.

== Business ==
In 2020, Ferreira founded a business, Fionn & Co., focused on microplastic removal technology. In 2020 and 2021 his work was featured by the global campaign by Hewlett-Packard: For every dream.

Alongside Fionn & Co., Ferreira co‑founded the nonprofit Green Journey Coalition, a 501(c)(3) environmental organization dedicated to making microplastic removal technologies and research openly accessible worldwide. Through the Green Journey Coalition, the team develops and pilots larger‑scale prototypes, tests continuous‑flow systems, and works toward affordable deployment in municipal plants and coastal remediation projects. Ferreira also publishes a newsletter, Fionn's Green Journey, which explores the science, policy, and real‑world applications behind his microplastic removal work, while inviting readers and supporters to contribute to the Green Journey Coalition’s mission.

== Recognition ==
In 2018, the MIT Lincoln Laboratory named a minor planet after Ferreira, following his being awarded 2nd place at the Intel International Science and Engineering Fair.

In 2021, he was named a National Geographic Society Young Explorer; he has since been working on a new platform for youth in the space of invention with the help of funding from the society. That same year, he was included in the Forbes 30 Under 30 list in the Science and Healthcare category.

In September 2021, Ferreira received the Premio Internazionale Giuseppe Sciacca award for his conservation and ecological efforts.

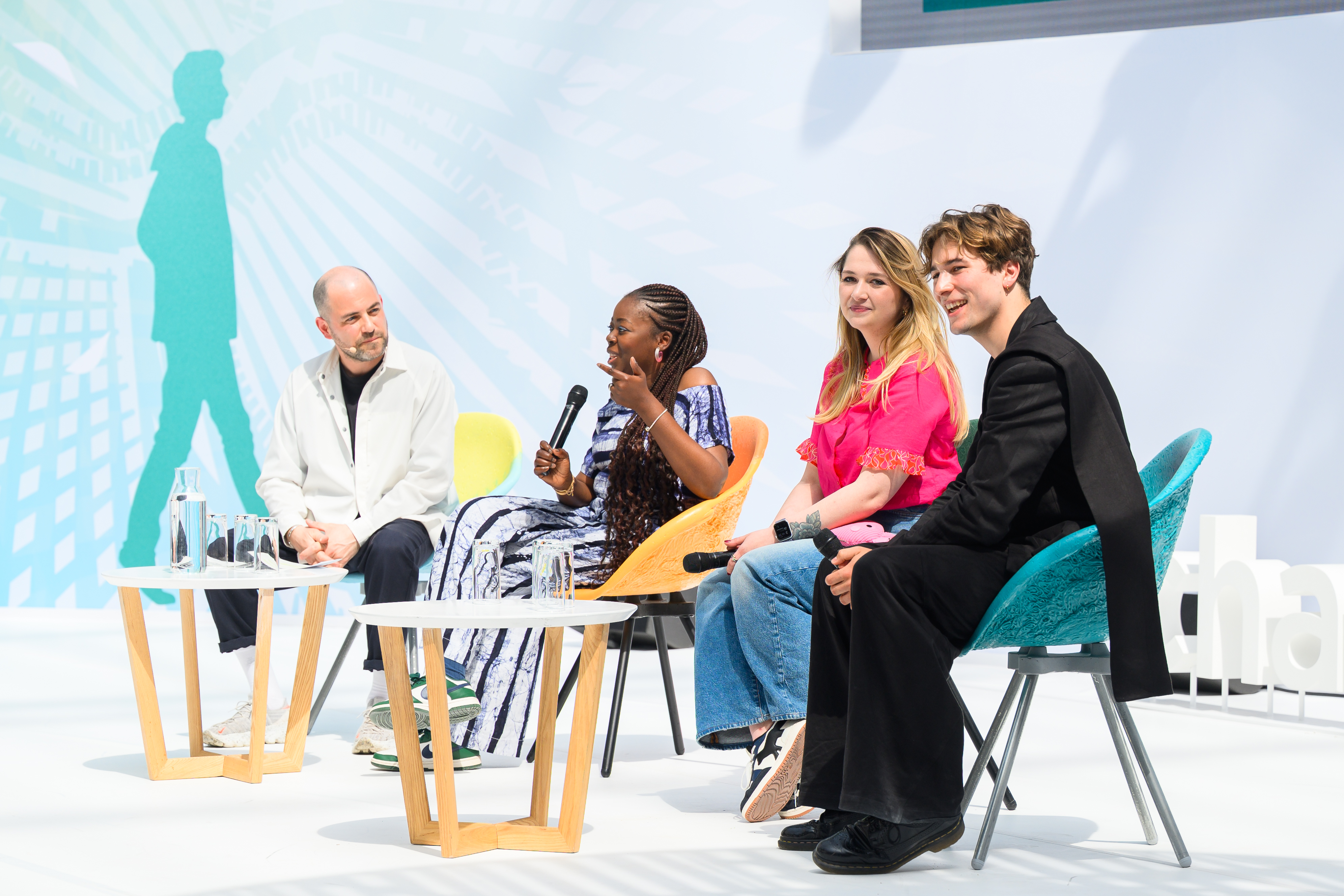
Fionn Ferreira ChangeNOW 2025

Ferreira has spoken at several international forums, including:

- 2019 Global Plastic Health Summit
- 2020 World Economic Forum
- 2020 Smithsonian Institution Earth Optimism Summit
- 2020 GreenTech Festival Berlin
- 2021 Regeneron Pharmaceuticals ISEF
- 2021 Young Plastic Pollution Challenge
- 2021 Leuven Conference
- 2021 Viva Technology
- 2021 Infoshare Conference (Poland)
- 2021 YOUTHTOPIA Younite
- 2022 ChangeNOW
- 2022 Ativa-te
- 2023 House of Lords
- 2024 ChangeNOW
- 2025 Quantum Delta NL Masterclass
- 2025 ChangeNOW

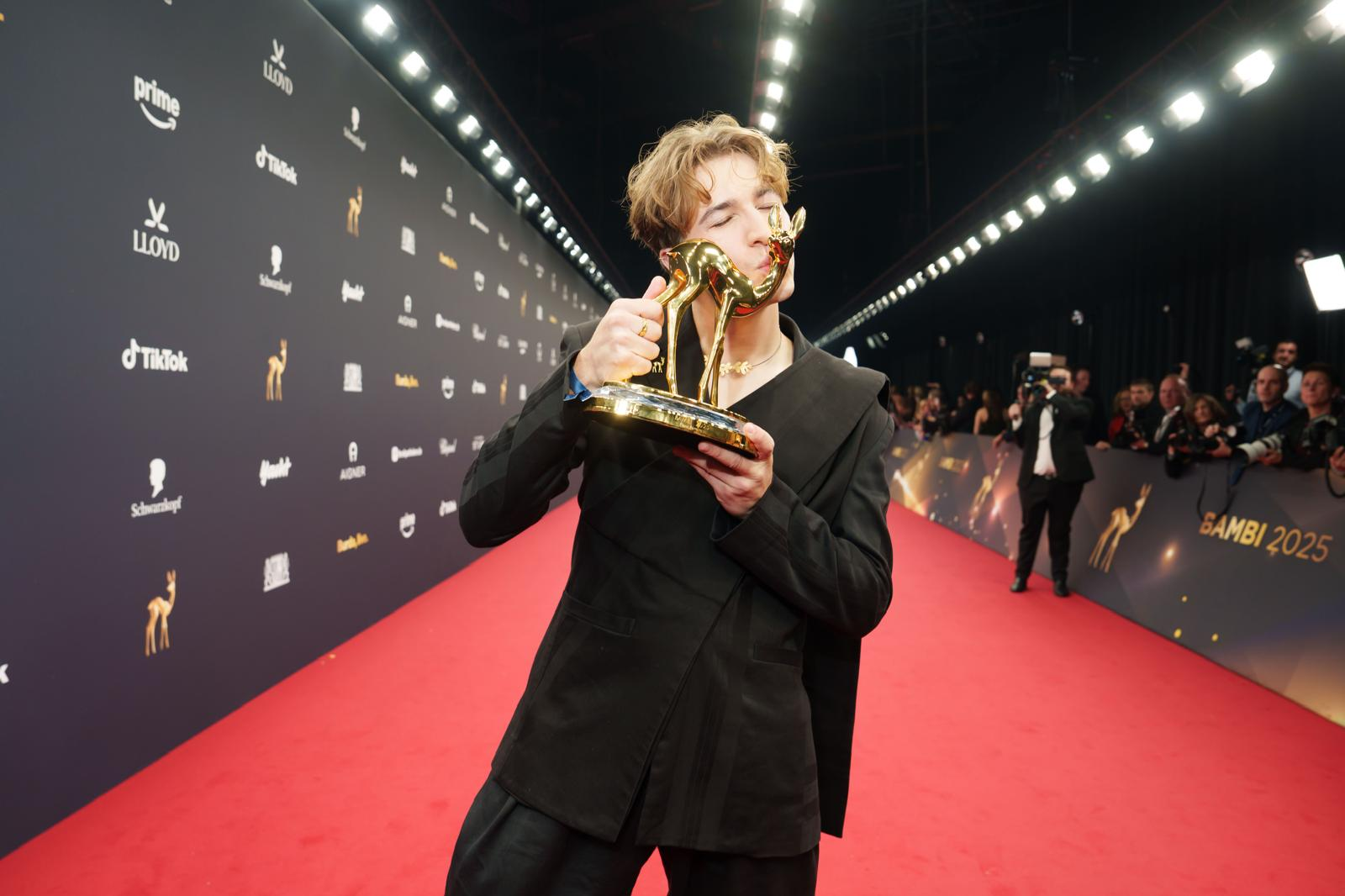
Fionn Ferreira on the red carpet after receiving a BAMBI award.

Ferreira has received several awards and recognitions:

- 2019 Google Science Fair Grand Prize
- 2020 World Economic Forum Change Maker
- 2021 Plastic Action Champion by the Global Plastic Action Partnership
- 2021 Premio Internazionale Giuseppe Sciacca
- 2021 National Geographic Young Explorer
- 2021 Forbes 30 Under 30
- 2022 Renaissance Award
- 2023 European Patent Office Young Inventor's Prize
- 2025 Bambi Award 'Our Earth'

== Television ==
In 2024, Ferreira began presenting What’s Next? Science, an educational television series on RTÉ designed to engage children and young adults with the future of science and sustainability. The show, aired as part of RTÉ Kids programming, features Ferreira exploring topics such as climate innovation, clean energy, ocean science, and space, while encouraging viewers to think critically and creatively about solving global challenges.

The series blends interactive demonstrations, storytelling, and guest appearances by scientists and changemakers to highlight the power of youth innovation and science communication. It was well received for its accessible approach to complex topics and its positive representation of young scientists.
