= Viva Technology =

Annual technology trade show held in Paris

- Genre: Annual Technology Conference
- Venue: Paris expo Porte de Versailles
- Location: Paris
- Country: France
- Inaugurated: 2016
- Founders: Publicis Groupe and Groupe Les Echos
- Attendance: 200,000+ visitors (2026)
- Website: Official website

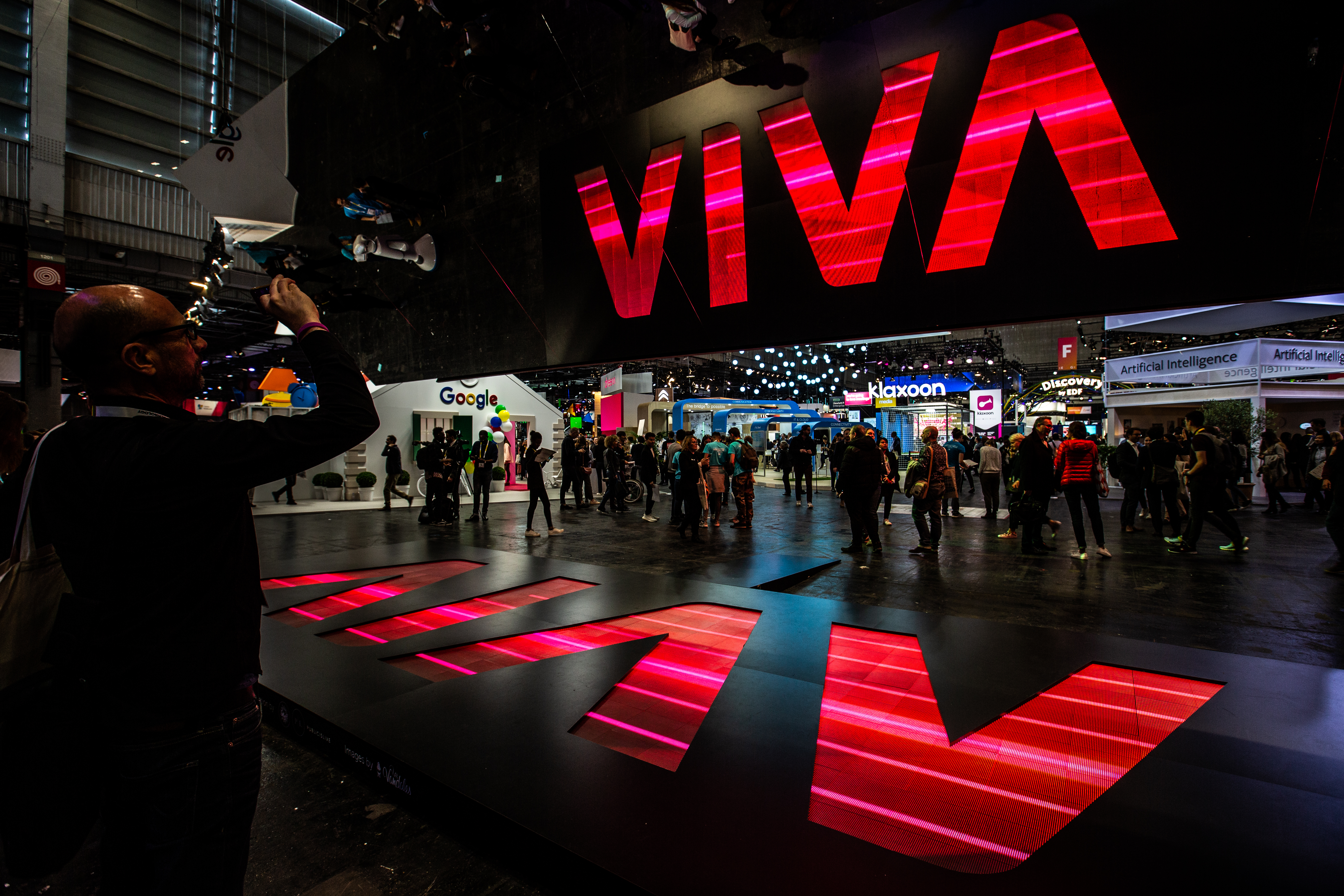
Vivatech 2019

Viva Technology, or VivaTech, is an annual technology conference, dedicated to innovation and startups, held in Paris, France. VivaTech was founded in 2016 by Publicis Groupe and Groupe Les Echos. The first two days of VivaTech are for startups, investors, executives, students and academics, and it is open to the general public on the third day.

== 2016 ==
The first year of VivaTech was held from the 30th of June to the 2nd of July 2016 in Paris, and gathered 45,000 visitors including more than 5,000 startup companies.

== 2017 ==
In 2017, VivaTech was held at Paris Expo Porte de Versailles from June 14th to June 16th in Paris. In attendance were 6,000+ startup firms, 1,400+ investors, and 1,500+ journalists. French President Emmanuel Macron delivered the keynote address and announced the creation of a 10-billion Euro fund for innovation and the launch of a French technology visa for international entrepreneurs.

One thousand startups were exhibited in 20 open innovation "labs" sponsored by corporate groups (AccorHotels, Air France, KLM, Airbus, BNPP, La Poste, Cisco, Engie, Carrefour, LVMH, RATP Group, SNCF, Sodexo, Sanofi, Orange, TF1, Talan, Pari mutuel urbain, Vinci Energies, Valeo).

Speakers including Eric Schmidt, Daniel Zhang and John Collison were also in attendance.

== 2018 ==
In 2018, VivaTech took place from 24 to 26 May in Paris. Over 100,000 visitors and over 300 speakers attended the third edition of the event including Mark Zuckerberg, Satya Nadella, Dara Khosrowshahi, Ginni Rometty, Chuck Robbins and Bill McDermott.

French President Emmanuel Macron returned to VivaTech in 2018 and announced that the French government will launch a R900 million-programme aimed at investing in African startups.

A partnership was established with TechCrunch and the Startup Battlefield, a competition for startups where the winners attended the Startup Battlefield finals in San Francisco in September 2018.

== 2019 ==
In 2019, the fourth edition of the event was marked by a trend towards positive innovation ("tech for good") as well as the presence of 124,000 visitors at Paris Expo Porte de Versailles, on 16 and 17 May for professionals, and on 18 May for the general public.

Nearly 13,000 startups were present, as well as 450 prominent figures from all over the world, such as Jack Ma of Alibaba Group, Justin Trudeau, Olympic medallist Usain Bolt, Holly Ridings of NASA, Ken Hu of Huawei, Young Sohn of Samsung, John Kerry and Margrethe Vestager.

== 2021 ==
In 2021, the fifth edition of the event was marked by a trend towards Positive change through technology at Paris Expo Porte de Versailles and online, on 16, 17 and 18 June.

Prominent figures from all over the world were present, such as Tim Cook of Apple, Peggy Johnson of Magic Leap, Eric Yuan of Zoom, Mark Zuckerberg of Facebook, Melissa Bell of CNN, Emmanuel Macron and Fionn Ferreira

== 2022 ==
In June 2022, for the sixth edition of VivaTech, 91,000 visitors were recorded, an attendance which remains lower than the figures before COVID-19.

== 2023 ==
In June 2023, for the seventh edition of VivaTech, big names in global tech are expected such as Elon Musk, head of Tesla, SpaceX and Twitter, and Yann LeCun, chief scientist of Meta's AI department. The President of the French Republic Emmanuel Macron is going there again. Bernard Arnault, president of LVMH, as well as Dan Schulman, president of PayPal, and Christel Heydemann, general manager of Orange, are among the speakers.

The edition reached a record by attracting more than 150,000 visitors over the entire duration of the event, almost 60,000 more than during the previous edition. The number of visitors to Viva Tech thus exceeds for the year 2023 that of CES, a benchmark show in the field of new technologies, organized each year in Las Vegas.

== 2024 ==
The eighth edition of VivaTech was held from 22nd to 25th of May at the Paris Expo Porte de Versailles, and attracted more than 165,000 visitors from 160+ nationalities over the four days of the event, setting another attendance record. Elon Musk virtually attended VivaTech and shared his personal vision as well as the advances made by his companies in the field of Artificial Intelligence, which have been the subject of much debate. Japan was honored as the country of the year.

== 2025 ==
The 2025 edition of VivaTech, held from June 11th to the 14th, continued the upward trajectory of attendance. More than 180,000 visitors (15,000 more than the previous edition) from over 170 countries gathered at the Paris Expo Porte de Versailles. 14,000+ startups exhibited, with representatives from industry leaders and key tech companies like L'Oréal, BNP Paribas, AWS, IBM, and more. Many high-profile speakers attended as well, including NVIDIA CEO Jensen Huang, Mistral AI CEO Arthur Mensch, LVMH's Bernard Arnault, along with many others.
