= Alexander Barnes =

American chemist

Alexander Benjamin Barnes
- Born: May 1, 1981 (age 45); St. Louis, Missouri, United States
- Education: Massachusetts Institute of Technology (PhD); Whitman College (BS)
- Known for: innovations in Nuclear Magnetic Resonance
- Awards: 2019 Varian Young Investigator Award; 2018 Camille Dreyfus Teacher-Scholar Award
- Scientific career
- Fields: Chemistry
- Workplaces: ETH Zurich; Washington University in St. Louis; Stanford University
- Doctoral advisor: Robert G. Griffin
- Notable students: Fionn Ferreira

Alexander Benjamin Barnes is an American chemist. Educated at Whitman College and the Massachusetts Institute of Technology, he has taught at Washington University in St. Louis and ETH Zurich.

== Career ==
Alexander Barnes earned his undergraduate degree in chemistry in 2003 from Whitman College in Walla Walla, Washington. After earning his Ph.D. in chemistry in 2011 from the Massachusetts Institute of Technology under advisor Robert G. Griffin, he worked as a postdoctoral research associate at Stanford University. He was an assistant chemistry professor of chemistry in Arts and Sciences at Washington University in St. Louis from 2012 to 2019, and is presently a Full Professor of Solid State NMR Spectroscopy at the Swiss Federal Institute of Technology ETH Zurich.

Barnes specializes in developing hardware for the interrogation of chemical structures using Nuclear magnetic resonance spectroscopy. Some of his most notable innovations include the use of spherical sample containers instead of cylindrical ones and frequency-agile gyrotrons for use in dynamic nuclear polarization (DNP) NMR experiments.

In 2018, Barnes received the Camille Dreyfus Teacher-Scholar Award.

At the 2019 Experimental Nuclear Magnetic Resonance Conference in Asilomar, California, Barnes received the Varian Young Investigator award.
