= Martin Thursfield =

English cricketer

Personal information
- Full name: Martin John Thursfield
- Born: 14 December 1971 (age 54); South Shields, County Durham, England
- Batting: Right-handed
- Bowling: Right-arm medium

Domestic team information
- Years: Team
- 1990: Middlesex
- 1992–1996: Hampshire
- 1997: Sussex

Career statistics
Competition	First-class	List A
Matches	24	33
Runs scored	309	60
Batting average	15.45	6.00
100s/50s	–/–	–/–
Top score	47	19
Balls bowled	2.844	1,434
Wickets	38	25
Bowling average	40.50	46.96
5 wickets in innings	1	–
10 wickets in match	–	–
Best bowling	6/130	3/31
Catches/stumpings	2/–	6/–
- Source: Cricinfo, 11 December 2009

Martin John Thursfield (born 14 December 1971) is an English former cricketer who played first-class cricket as a medium pace bowler for Hampshire, Middlesex, and Sussex.

Thursfield was born in December 1971 at South Shields, County Durham. A club cricketer for Boldon Cricket Club, he initially had trials with Worcestershire in 1988. In April 1989, he joined the staff at Middlesex. He made his debut in first-class cricket for Middlesex against the touring New Zealanders at Lord's in 1990. He made a further first-class appearance for Middlesex in the 1990 County Championship against Essex at Ilford. Thursfield was deemed enough of a pace bowling prospect to be selected to tour New Zealand with Young England Cricketers in the winter which followed the 1990 season. During the tour, he made a single Youth One Day International appearance against the New Zealand Young Cricketers at Hamilton. Thursfield broke his leg during a match on tour, but only left the field of play after he had insisted on bowling two more deliveries. This injury had the impact of severely stunting his development as a bowler.

He left Middlesex following the 1990 season, joining Hampshire for 1991. He returned to action four months after breaking his leg. With the presence of bowlers such as Malcolm Marshall in the Hampshire side, Thursfield found his first team opportunities limited. His first team debut would not come until 1993, when he played a first-class match against Oxford University. He subsequently made two appearances in the 1993 County Championship, alongside six List A one-day appearances in the 1993 Axa Equity & Law League. The following season he made seven appearances in the County Championship, alongside appearing in first-class matches against Oxford University and the touring South Africans; in first-class matches that season, he took 17 wickets at an average of 30.82, taking his only five wicket haul with figures of 6 for 130 against Middlesex. He made six further one-day appearances in the 1994 Axa Equity & Law League. After the 1994 season, Thursfield found his first-class opportunities limited and was mostly utilised in one-day cricket, before being released by Hampshire following the 1996 season. In twenty first-class matches for Hampshire, he took 33 wickets at an average of 39.42. In 31 one-day matches, he took 23 wickets at an average of 48.91, with best figures of 3 for 31.

Thursfield signed a one-year deal for Sussex for the 1997 season, making two first-class and one-day appearances. He was released by Sussex just three months into his one-year contract, with their chief executive Tony Pigott opining that he felt Thursfield was never going to be a regular in the Sussex side. After the end of his cricket career, Thursfield became a police officer with Durham Constabulary, where he served alongside former cricketer Gary Brown.
