= Danny Livingstone =

English cricketer (1933–1988)

- Danny Livingstone in 1961

Personal information
- Full name: Daintes Abbia Livingstone
- Born: 21 September 1933; St. John's, British Leeward Islands
- Died: 8 September 1988 (aged 54); St. John's, Antigua and Barbuda
- Nickname: Danny
- Batting: Left-handed
- Bowling: Right-arm medium

Domestic team information
- Years: Team
- 1959–1972: Hampshire

Career statistics
Competition	First-class	List A
Matches	301	54
Runs scored	12,722	1,044
Batting average	27.89	25.46
100s/50s	16/65	–/5
Top score	200	92
Balls bowled	140	0
Wickets	1	–
Bowling average	93.00	–
5 wickets in innings	–	–
10 wickets in match	–	–
Best bowling	1/31	–
Catches/stumpings	243/2	14/–
- Source: Cricinfo, 28 May 2024

Daintes Abbia "Danny" Livingstone (21 September 1933 – 8 September 1988) was an Antiguan cricketer who played first-class cricket for Hampshire as a left-handed middle order batsman in nearly 300 first-class matches from 1959 to 1972. The first black West Indian to play for Hampshire, he was a member of their 1961 County Championship winning team and played in their first ever one-day match in 1963. In first-class cricket for Hampshire, he scored over 12,500 runs. He later managed the Combined Islands cricket team in the West Indies, and worked for the Government of Antigua and Barbuda as its Director of Sports.

== Early life ==
Livingstone was born at St. John's on the island of Antigua in September 1933. He was educated there at the Antigua Grammar School, before continuing his education in Canada at the Collegiate School, Toronto. In 1953, he moved to London to undertake his two years of National Service with the Royal Air Force (RAF). While serving with the RAF, he played minor matches for the Royal Air Force cricket team. Having come to the attention of Warwickshire during his National Service, Livingstone played a full season for their second eleven in the 1957 Minor Counties Championship. However, he was not engaged by Warwickshire at the end of the season, with the county feeling they had too many batsmen in their squad, coupled with concerns over Livingstone's stroke play.

== Career with Hampshire ==
=== Early years ===
Livingstone spent 1958 in London playing club cricket, before coming to Hampshire for a nets trial at the start of the 1959 season. In July 1959, he made his debut in first-class cricket against Oxford University at Bournemouth, thus becoming the first black West Indian to play for Hampshire. He qualified to play in the County Championship through residency prior to the 1960 season, with Livingstone expected to compete for a place in the Hampshire middle order. He played regularly for Hampshire in 1960, but did not fully establish himself in the team. At the end of the season, he played for the Commonwealth XI against an England XI at Hastings. In 1961, the year in which Hampshire won their first County Championship, Livingstone established himself in the side with 35 appearances. It was also the first season in which he passed a thousand runs, making 1,643, and made his maiden century (102 not out) against Northamptonshire. Later in the season, against Derbyshire in Hampshire's penultimate match of the season, it was Livingstone who caught Bob Taylor to make certain of their County Championship title.

In 1962, he made a further 31 first-class appearances. Livingstone had his most successful season as a batsman, scoring 1,817 runs at an average of 37.08. Against Surrey he made his highest career score of 200. His innings began in fortuitous circumstances, when he was dropped first ball. With Hampshire having reached 128 for 8, Alan Castell (76) joined Livingstone at the crease, with the pair putting on 230 for the ninth wicket. This remains, as of 2026, a Hampshire record partnership for that wicket. Earlier in the season he had made an unbeaten century against the touring Pakistanis, an innings in which according to Wisden, he was "untroubled". Further success followed in 1963, with Livingstone again passing a thousand runs (1,503) for the season. He made 151 runs against the touring West Indians, which helped to set up and enthralling end to the match which saw the West Indians reduced to their last two batsman and ten Hampshire fielders close-in to them; the match ended in a draw. He was a member of the Hampshire eleven who played in the county's inaugural List A one-day match against Derbyshire in the 1963 Gillette Cup.

=== Struggles with consistency ===
Livingstone's consistent form continued into 1964, where in his thirty matches he scored 1,671 runs at an average of 35.55. Against Kent in August 1964, he made back-to-back centuries with scores of 117 and 105 not out at Canterbury; in doing so, he became Hampshire's leading run scorer for the season, supplanting Roy Marshall who been Hampshire's leading run-scorer in the two previous seasons. Despite a consistent start to his Hampshire career, his form badly fell away in 1965 with him scoring 680 runs at an average of 18.88, from 23 matches. His returns in 1966 were only slightly better in first-class cricket. Notably at Bournemouth in a County Championship match against Middlesex, Livingstone (116) and Henry Horton (148 not out) put on 272 runs for the third wicket, which as of 2026 remains a Hampshire record for that wicket against Middlesex. Against Lincolnshire in the 1966 Gillette Cup first round, he made his highest career one-day score with 92, and shared in a partnership of 124 runs for the third wicket with Horton, who made 54. Livingstone was declared Man of the Match for his performance, for which he was awarded £50 by Bill Edrich.

Livingstone passed a thousand runs for the season in 1967, the first time he had done so since 1964, and scored two centuries. Against Nottinghamshire in the County Championship in May, he deputised midway through the match for wicket-keeper Brian Timms, who had broken his nose when keeping to Peter Sainsbury. The Nottingham Guardian remarked that he "performed very creditably" keeping-wicket. After featuring in only eighteen first-class matches in 1968, Livingstone featured 26 times in first-class cricket in 1969, while featuring extensively in the first season of the one-day Sunday League. He also played for D. H. Robins' personal team against Oxford University at Eastbourne. During the off-season in November 1969, he managed to secure himself employment for the winter back in London at the Hackney Employment Exchange. Livingstone made 1,020 runs in 1970, which would be the final time he would reach the milestone of a thousand runs in a season. At the beginning of the season, he made his final first-class century, making 103 runs against Middlesex in a partnership of 263 for the fourth with Marshall; as of 2024 this remains a Hampshire record for that wicket against Middlesex. He once again featured extensively for Hampshire that season in one-day cricket, making fourteen appearances in John Player League. Wisden noted that by 1970, his consistency as a batsman had deserted him. During the season, he voiced his concerns on the proposed South African tour of England in 1970, following the D'Oliveira affair.

=== Legal issues and later cricket ===
Midway through the 1970 season, Livingstone was charged by the Metropolitan Police with conspiring between 6 November 1969 and 26 March 1970 to cheat and defraud the Department of Social Security of £1,095.15s. It was alleged that he had conspired to submit false and fraudulent claims for supplementary benefit. After an initial hearing at Old Street Magistrates Court, his case was sent for trial at the Old Bailey for June 1971. Following a trial he was found not guilty, reportedly sobbing when the verdict was delivered. Hampshire had been due to grant Livingstone his benefit worth "many thousands of pounds" in 1971, but the trial had put this on-hold. Prior to the trials commencement, he featured in seven first-class matches, but just two more after its conclusion. He also featured in five matches in the 1971 John Player League. He was granted his benefit the following season, but did not even play in his benefit match against Surrey. In 1972, he featured in just three first-class and two one-day matches. It had been decided earlier in the season that the contracts of Livingstone and fast bowler Butch White would not be extended.

In 299 first-class matches for Hampshire, Livingstone scored 12,660 runs at an average of 27.94; he made sixteen centuries, alongside 65 fifties. He was described by Wisden as "an attacking batsman". He took one first-class wicket, that of Ken Barrington in the final match of his career in 1968. A capable fielder, he took 240 catches and occasionally kept-wicket. In one-day cricket, he made 54 appearances, scoring 1,044 runs at an average of 25.46.

== Later life and death ==
Livingstone returned to Antigua when he retired from playing, and worked for the government as Director of Sports, where he did much to further the development of cricket and football in Antigua and Barbuda. He continued to play cricket at a minor level for Antigua in the inter-island Hesketh Bell Shield, briefly captaining the side. In 1973, he played an important role alongside Lester Bird in persuading Len Creed, vice chairman at Somerset, who was in Antigua at the time as part of a West Country touring side, to take Viv Richards. Later in the 1970s, he managed the Combined Islands cricket team. With the Combined Islands team being divided into the Leeward Islands and Windward Islands cricket team's in 1981, Livingstone would later coach the Leeward Islands team. After returning to Antigua he married, becoming the father of five children. Livingstone died at St John's in September 1988, aged 54.
