= Peter Haslop =

English cricketer (born 1941)

Personal information
- Full name: Peter Haslop
- Born: 17 October 1941 (age 85); Midhurst, Sussex, England
- Batting: Right-handed
- Bowling: Right-arm medium

Domestic team information
- Years: Team
- 1962–1972: Hampshire

Career statistics
Competition	First-class	List A
Matches	1	4
Runs scored	2	–
Batting average	–	–
100s/50s	–/–	–/–
Top score	2*	0*
Balls bowled	204	210
Wickets	2	4
Bowling average	41.00	39.25
5 wickets in innings	–	–
10 wickets in match	–	–
Best bowling	2/82	2/51
Catches/stumpings	1/–	–/–
- Source: Cricinfo, 23 December 2009

Peter Haslop (born 17 October 1941) is a former English first-class cricketer.

Haslop was born at Midhurst in October 1941 and grew up there as a child. He played cricket at the age of ten for Woolbeding, before moving to Midhurst Cricket Club after taking over 100 wickets in a season aged 16. He was then recommended to Hampshire, who signed him on a trial basis. Having begun playing for the Hampshire Second XI in 1961, Haslop made a single appearance in first-class cricket for Hampshire in a televised match against the touring Pakistanis at Bournemouth in 1962. He deputised in this match for first-choice bowlers Derek Shackleton, Butch White and Malcolm Heath. With his right-arm medium pace bowling, he took the wickets of Imtiaz Ahmed and Ijaz Butt for the cost of 82 runs from 34 overs in the Pakistanis only innings. He continued to play for the Hampshire Second XI until 1965, but with Alan Castell's conversion from leg spin to pace bowling, Haslop became surplus to requirements at Hampshire. He instead went into coaching and played club cricket in Southampton for Deanery Cricket Club in the Southern Premier League.

Nine years after his last senior appearance for Hampshire, Haslop found himself deputising for White in a List A one-day match against Leicestershire at Portsmouth in the 1971 John Player League. He made a second one-day appearance against in the same competition against Worcestershire, before White returned. With both White and Bob Cottam leaving Hampshire at the end of the 1971 season, Haslop made a further two one-day appearances in 1972, against Somerset in the Benson & Hedges Cup and Gloucestershire in the John Player League. In four one-day matches for Hampshire, he took 4 wickets at an average of 39.25, with best figures of 2 for 51. Haslop is a regular spectator of cricket matches at the Rose Bowl.
