= Sean Morris (cricketer) =

English cricketer

Personal information
- Full name: Robert Sean Millner Morris
- Born: 10 September 1968 (age 58); Great Horwood, Buckinghamshire, England
- Batting: Right-handed
- Bowling: Right-arm off break

Domestic team information
- Years: Team
- 1992–1996: Hampshire

Career statistics
Competition	First-class	List A
Matches	37	28
Runs scored	1,830	739
Batting average	29.04	29.56
100s/50s	3/7	0/3
Top score	174	87
Balls bowled	4	–
Wickets	0	–
Bowling average	–	–
5 wickets in innings	–	–
10 wickets in match	–	–
Best bowling	–	–
Catches/stumpings	43/–	8/–
- Source: Cricinfo, 22 December 2009

Robert Sean Millner Morris is a former English first-class cricketer. Born in 1968 in Buckinghamshire, he was educated at Swanbourne House School, Stowe School and Durham University, where he graduated with a degree in sociology and captained the cricket and hockey teams.

Morris had trials with Nottinghamshire and Worcestershire before joining Hampshire. He played 37 first-class matches as a right-handed opening batsman, enjoying his best season in 1994 when he averaged 49 and scored a career best 174 against Nottinghamshire. Unable to secure a regular place in the Hampshire line-up, Morris was released in 1996, his final innings a century against Cambridge University.

He became the chief executive of the Professional Cricketers' Association in 2008. Morris left that role in 2009 to become the chief executive of the Rajasthan Royals in the Indian Premier League.
