= Steve Malone =

English cricketer (born 1953)

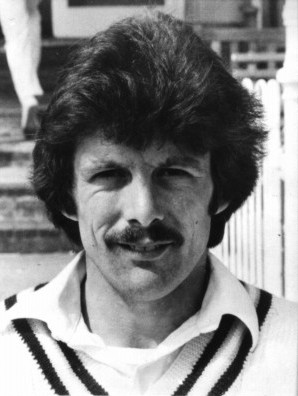
- Malone in 1981

Personal information
- Full name: Steven John Malone
- Born: 19 October 1953 (age 73); Chelmsford, Essex, England
- Nickname: Piggy
- Batting: Right-handed
- Bowling: Right-arm fast-medium

Domestic team information
- Years: Team
- 1975–1978: Essex
- 1980–1984: Hampshire
- 1985: Glamorgan
- 1986: Durham
- 1987: Dorset
- 1990–1992: Wiltshire

Umpiring information
- WT20Is umpired: 1 (2010)
- FC umpired: 6 (2008–2011)
- LA umpired: 5 (2010–2011)

Career statistics
Competition	First-class	List A
Matches	57	73
Runs scored	182	63
Batting average	5.87	4.84
100s/50s	–/–	–/–
Top score	23	16
Balls bowled	7,586	3,392
Wickets	118	106
Bowling average	35.89	23.57
5 wickets in innings	3	1
10 wickets in match	1	–
Best bowling	7/55	5/34
Catches/stumpings	14/–	6/–
- Source: Cricinfo, 13 February 2010

Steven John Malone (born 19 October 1953) is an English former first-class cricketer and cricket umpire. A journeyman county cricketer, he played at first-class level for Essex, Hampshire, and Glamorgan. He played predominantly for Hampshire as a right-arm fast-medium bowler, taking 103 wickets from 46 first-class matches and 99 wickets from 65 matches List A one-day matches. After the end of his first-class career, he played Minor Counties Cricket and later became a first-class umpire.

== Playing career ==
=== Essex and Hampshire ===
Malone was born at Chelmsford in October 1953. He played club cricket for Witham Cricket Club in Essex, where he was spotted as a fast-bowler by Trevor Bailey. Bailey persuaded him to play under the guidance of his son with Hadleigh and Thundersley in the Essex Cricket League, with Malone subsequently being signed by Essex. He played just two first-class matches for Essex against Cambridge University at Fenner's in 1975 and 1978. He left Essex in 1979, following their first County Championship title.

Malone joined Hampshire in 1980, making seven appearances in the County Championship. However, during his debut season he was utilised more in List A one-day cricket, making sixteen appearances across that season's one-day competitions, taking 23 wickets. Eight first-class appearances followed in 1981, alongside seventeen one-day appearances in which he took 27 wickets; against Cheshire in the NatWest Trophy he took his maiden one-day five wicket haul with figures of 5 for 34. In the 1982 season, Malone found his opportunities in the Hampshire eleven limited, making just six appearances each in first-class and one-day cricket. Against Oxford University in 1982, he took his career best first-class figures of 7 for 55, ending with match figures of 12 for 110. Malone established himself in the Hampshire in the County Championship in 1983, and made a total of 22 first-class appearances across the season, in which he took 48 wickets at an average of 37.43. He also featured in 23 one-day matches in 1983, taking 37 wickets at an average of 20.37. Alongside Keith Stevenson, Malone was offered a one-year contract extension at the end of the 1983 season. The 1984 season was to be his last playing for Hampshire, with Malone making three first-class and one-day appearances, with the presence of Malcolm Marshall keeping him out of the starting eleven. He was released at the end of that season, alongside Mel Hussain and Kevin Emery. In 46 first-class appearances for Hampshire, he took 103 wickets at an average of 33.79. In one-day cricket, he took 99 wickets at an average of 22.07 from 65 matches.

=== Glamorgan and minor counties cricket ===
Following his release, Malone joined Glamorgan for the 1985 season. He made nine appearances for Glamorgan in first-class matches in 1985, taking 5 for 38 against Hampshire at Southampton, which were to be his best figures in the County Championship. His nine first-class appearances for Glamorgan yielded 13 wickets at an average of 50.30. He also made two one-day appearances in the 1985 John Player Special League. Having found his opportunities at Glamorgan limited, he left following the end of the 1985 season.

From there, he proceeded to the North of England to play minor counties cricket for Durham, playing in three Minor Counties Championship and MCCA Knockout Trophy matches apiece, alongside playing against Warwickshire in the NatWest Trophy. In 1986, he was chosen to play for the combined Minor Counties cricket team in the Benson & Hedges Cup, making three appearances in the group stages of the tournament. He returned south in 1987, playing for Dorset twice each in the Minor Counties Championship and MCCA Knockout Trophy, and once in the NatWest Trophy. Malone began playing minor counties cricket for Wiltshire in 1990, with him making 23 Minor Counties Championship appearances between 1990 and 1992, two MCCA Knockout Trophy appearances, and a single one-day appearance in the 1990 NatWest Trophy.

== Post-playing career ==
Following the conclusion of his playing career in county cricket, Malone played club cricket for the Old Tauntonians, Lymington, and Waterlooville in the Southern Premier Cricket League. He became a youth coach at Hampshire, before taking up umpiring and standing in Southern Premier Cricket League matches. From there, he progressed to stand in minor counties and Second XI Championship matches. He was later appointed to the England and Wales Cricket Board's reserve umpires list, to which he was retained in 2008.

He first stood in a first-class match in 2008, between Oxford MCCU and Nottinghamshire at Oxford. In the same year, he was diagnosed with bowel cancer. Following intensive treatment with chemotherapy, he entered into remission. A year after his initial diagnosis, he returned to umpire in first-class cricket. Malone umpired in six first-class matches between 2009 and 2011, alongside five one-day matches in the 2010 and 2011 Clydesdale Bank 40 competitions. Malone also stood in a single Women's Twenty20 International between England Women and New Zealand Women at Southampton in 2010. Malone moved to Yorkshire in 2011, where he began umpiring in the Yorkshire Premier League under the mentorship of David Byas. He stopped umpiring at club level in 2023, standing at Lord's in the final of the Village Cup between Milford Hall and Leeds & Broomfield. In March 2024, he was appointed the Bradford Premier League's disciplinary officer.
