= Kevin Emery =

English cricketer (born 1960)

Personal information
- Full name: Kevin St John Dennis Emery
- Born: 28 February 1960 (age 66); Swindon, Wiltshire, England
- Height: 6 ft 3 in (1.91 m)
- Batting: Right-handed
- Bowling: Right-arm fast-medium

Domestic team information
- Years: Team
- 1978–1980: Wiltshire
- 1982–1984: Hampshire
- 1985–1993: Wiltshire

Career statistics
Competition	First-class	List A
Matches	30	21
Runs scored	45	11
Batting average	3.75	3.20
100s/50s	–/–	–/–
Top score	18	6*
Balls bowled	4,518	974
Wickets	88	27
Bowling average	25.35	26.03
5 wickets in innings	3	1
10 wickets in match	1	–
Best bowling	6/51	5/24
Catches/stumpings	3/–	2/–
- Source: Cricinfo, 14 December 2009

Kevin St John Dennis Emery (born 28 February 1960) is an English former first-class cricketer.

Emery was born at Swindon in February 1960. He made his debut in minor counties cricket for Wiltshire against the Somerset Second XI in the 1978 Minor Counties Championship, later making eight appearances in the 1980 Minor Counties Championship. Having graduated from the University of Bristol with an economics degree, he briefly trialled with Gloucestershire, while in 1981 he signed a summer contract with Worcestershire, but did not play for their first eleven. During this time, he earned an income by working as a bricklayer.

Emery then came to the attention of Hampshire, making his debut in first-class cricket for the county against Leicestershire at Southampton in the 1982 County Championship. Making 24 first-class appearances in his debut season, Emery had success as a right-arm fast-medium bowler. He took 83 wickets at an average of 23.71, claiming three five wicket hauls and taking ten-wickets in a match once. His best innings figures came against Glamorgan at Portsmouth, with Emery taking 6 for 51, and ten wickets across the match. His 83 wickets was the most by taken by a bowler in their debut season since Derek Underwood in 1963. His success in 1982 saw him selected to playing for England B against the touring Pakistanis. In that same season, he made his debut in List A one-day cricket against Kent in the Benson & Hedges Cup, with him making nineteen one-day appearances in 1982. In these, he took 27 wickets at an average of 24.25, with one five wicket haul against Essex. There was speculation that he could be selected for England's winter tour of Australia and New Zealand following the 1982 season. After the conclusion of the season, he was named Under-23 Bowler of the Year.

The following season, Emery struggled with injuries and had a dramatic reversal of form, with a loss of action in his run-up leading to a number of no-balls being bowled. In six first-class matches in 1983, he took five wickets at an expensive average of 52.40. That season he featured in a further one-day match against Essex in the Benson & Hedges Cup, before making his final appearance for Hampshire in the 1984 Benson & Hedges Cup against Gloucestershire. Emery was released at the end of the 1984 season, alongside bowlers Steve Malone and Mel Hussain. In 1986, he signed a one-year contract with Warwickshire, having rejected an approach from Somerset. However, injury meant he did not play for the first eleven and was subsequently released alongside nine other players at the end of the 1986 season. He returned to playing minor counties cricket for Wiltshire, appearing in nine Minor Counties Championship matches from 1986 to 1988, in addition to playing two MCCA Knockout Trophy one-day matches in 1985 and 1993.
