= Alan Wassell =

English cricketer

Personal information
- Full name: Alan Robert Wassell
- Born: 15 April 1940 (age 86); Fareham, Hampshire, England
- Batting: Left-handed
- Bowling: Slow left-arm orthodox

Domestic team information
- Years: Team
- 1957–1966: Hampshire
- 1959: Marylebone Cricket Club

Career statistics
Competition	First-class	List A
Matches	122	4
Runs scored	1,209	17
Batting average	8.95	8.50
100s/50s	0/1	0/0
Top score	61	11
Balls bowled	21,403	306
Wickets	320	8
Bowling average	27.09	27.37
5 wickets in innings	11	0
10 wickets in match	1	0
Best bowling	7/87	3/70
Catches/stumpings	96/–	2/–
- Source: Cricinfo, 21 February 2010

Alan Robert Wassell (born 15 April 1940) is an English former first-class cricketer who played for Hampshire between 1957 and 1966. A member of their 1961 County Championship winning team, he took 320 wickets from 121 first-class matches for Hampshire as a slow left-arm orthodox bowler.

== Cricket career ==
Wassell was born to a well-known Fareham family in April 1940. He impressed in club cricket for Fareham United, taking with his slow left-arm orthodox bowling nine of the ten wickets to fall against the staff of Winchester College in August 1956. His impressive performances continued into 1957, which gained him a place on the staff at Hampshire. He made his debut in first-class cricket for Hampshire against Cambridge University at Bournemouth in 1957, in what was his only first eleven appearance that season. Wassell made two further first-class appearances in 1958, which included his debut in the County Championship against Derbyshire. He featured more regularly in first-class cricket in 1959, making eleven appearances for Hampshire and one for the Marylebone Cricket Club against Oxford University; he took 25 wickets at an average of 27.24 in 1959. However, the following season he appeared in just two first-class matches for Hampshire against Oxford and Cambridge Universities.

At the start of Hampshire's 1961 County Championship winning season, the off-break bowler Mervyn Burden was preferred to Wassell in the Hampshire starting eleven. However, after July, Wassell became Hampshire's preferred spinner. Making 21 appearances during the season, he took 66 wickets at an average of 25.04, whilst taking four five wicket hauls. His season best figures of 7 for 87 came against Surrey, in which he took 12 for 163 across the match. The match was notable for Wassell bowling 56 overs in Surrey's first innings, in which he took 5 for 75, and 36.3 overs in their second innings; this took the overall number of balls he bowled in the match to 561, a Hampshire record for a match that still stands as of 2026. Having established himself in the Hampshire starting eleven and made large strides in his game during the 1961 season, Wassell was considered one of the most exciting spin bowling prospects in the country. The following season he made 23 appearances, taking 60 wickets at an average of 27.83. He made his highest first-class score with the bat in 1962, scoring 61 runs against Lancashire in a partnership of 95 for the seventh wicket with Leo Harrison.

Making 24 appearances in 1963, Wassell took 70 wickets – the most he would take in a season – at an average of 23.74. Against the touring West Indians at Southampton, he took four wickets in each West Indian innings, the most by a Hampshire bowler in the match. Wassell played in Hampshire's inaugural List A one-day match against Derbyshire in the 1963 Gillette Cup, with him taking three wickets in the match. His fortunes began to reverse beginning in 1964, when he took 46 wickets from twenty matches at an average of 35.23. In the same season, he made an additional two one-day appearances in the Gillette Cup against Wiltshire and Warwickshire. He made thirteen first-class appearances for Hampshire in 1965, taking 29 wickets at an average of 26.62. After making three first-class appearances in 1966, alongside a single one-day appearance in the Gillette Cup, Wassell released at the end of the season, along with Mike Barnard. In 121 first-class matches for Hampshire, he took 317 wickets at an average of 27.05; he took a five wicket haul on eleven occasions. With the bat, he scored 1,209 runs at a batting average of 8.95, making a single half century. In four one-day matches, he took 8 wickets at an average of 27.37.

== Later and personal life ==
Wassell married Joan Gladys Gatrell in July 1960 at St John the Evangelist's Church in Fareham. Following the end of his first-class career, he continued to play cricket at club level for Gosport Borough in the Southern Cricket League. Wassell suffered a stroke in January 2014, in which he lost his ability to speak. He regained some of his mobility through physiotherapy, which was funded by the Professional Cricketers' Association, of which he is an active member, following a recommendation by Peter Haslop.
