= Fletcha Middleton =

English cricketer (born 2002)

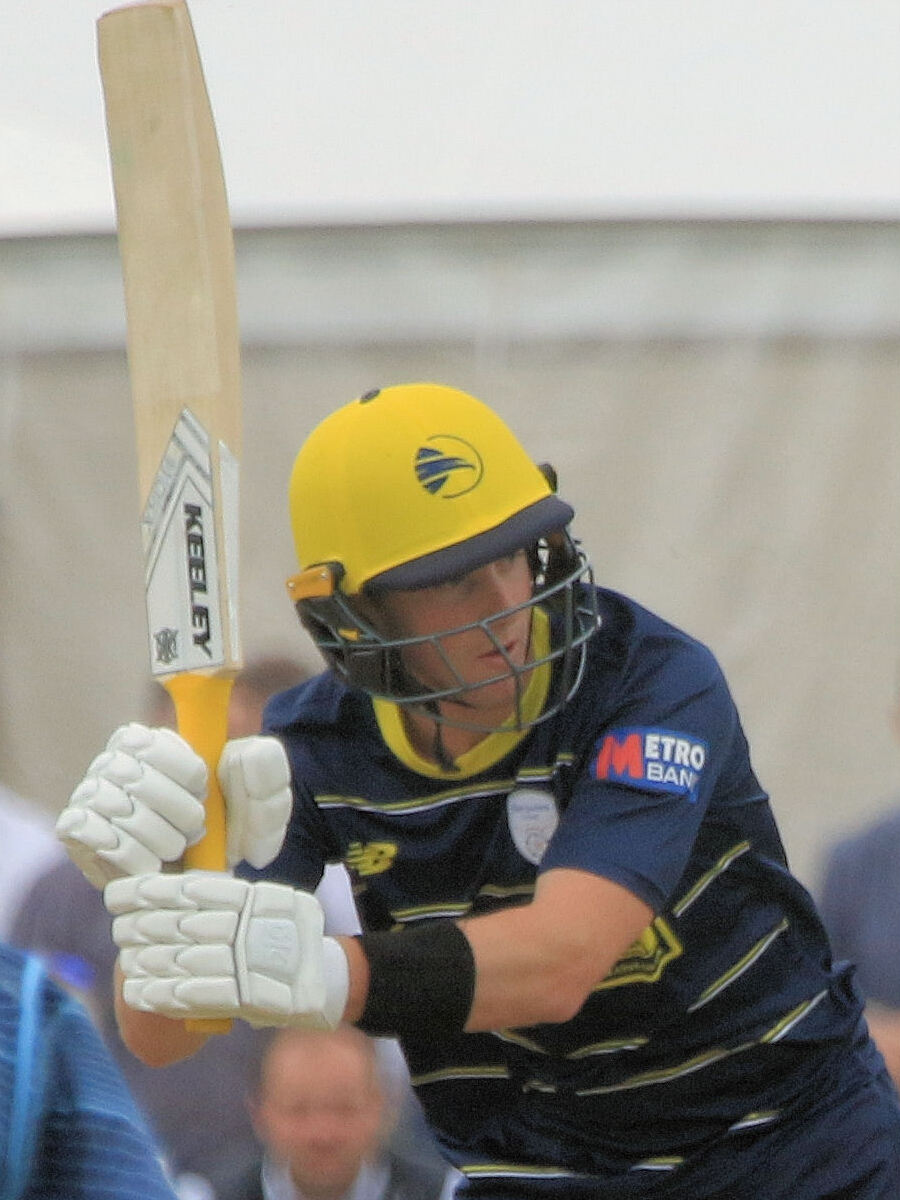
- Middleton in 2023

Personal information
- Full name: Fletcha Scott Middleton
- Born: 21 January 2002 (age 24); Winchester, Hampshire, England
- Batting: Right-handed
- Bowling: Right-arm off break
- Role: Batsman
- Relatives: Tony Middleton (father)

Domestic team information
- Years: Team
- 2021–present: Hampshire (squad no. 19)
- First-class debut: 13 May 2022 Hampshire v SLC Development XI
- List A debut: 12 August 2021 Hampshire v Durham

Career statistics
Competition	FC	LA	T20
Matches	44	42	3
Runs scored	1,977	1,224	36
Batting average	27.08	32.21	18.00
100s/50s	2/12	1/8	0/0
Top score	116	100	18
Catches/stumpings	26/–	19/–	1/–
- Source: Cricinfo, 12 August 2026

Fletcha Scott Middleton (born 21 January 2002) is an English cricketer. He made his List A debut on 12 August 2021, for Hampshire in the 2021 Royal London One-Day Cup. He made his first-class debut on 13 May 2022, for Hampshire against the Sri Lanka Cricket Development XI side during their tour of England.

== Personal life ==
He is the son of former Hampshire cricketer and batting coach Tony Middleton. He was born at Winchester in January 2002.
