= Tony Middleton (cricketer) =

English cricketer and cricket coach

Personal information
- Full name: Tony Charles Middleton
- Born: 1 February 1964 (age 62); Winchester, Hampshire, England
- Batting: Right-handed
- Bowling: Slow left-arm orthodox
- Relatives: Fletcha Middleton (son)

Domestic team information
- Years: Team
- 1984–1995: Hampshire

Career statistics
Competition	First-class	List A
Matches	109	61
Runs scored	5,753	2,139
Batting average	33.64	39.61
100s/50s	13/24	–/20
Top score	221	98
Balls bowled	236	0
Wickets	5	–
Bowling average	48.20	–
5 wickets in innings	–	–
10 wickets in match	–	–
Best bowling	2/41	–
Catches/stumpings	79/–	18/–
- Source: Cricinfo, 3 July 2022

Tony Charles Middleton (born 1 February 1964) is an English cricket coach and a former first-class cricketer. Middleton played for Hampshire from 1984 to 1995, making over 160 appearances across first-class and one-day cricket. Following his retirement in 1995, he has held a variety of coaching roles at Hampshire and as 2026 is the club's batting coach.

== Playing career ==
Middleton was born at Winchester in February 1964. Having been a member of the Hampshire Second XI since 1982, he made his debut for Hampshire in a first-class match against Kent at Bournemouth in the 1984 County Championship. He would have to wait two years before his appearance for the first team, when he made eight appearances in a late season run in the 1986 County Championship, before just an appearance each in 1987 and 1988, against Sussex and the touring Sri Lankans respectively. During his early years with Hampshire, Middleton found his opportunities limited by Hampshire possessing arguably the strongest batting line-up in their history, consisting of international batsmen David Gower, Gordon Greenidge, Trevor Jesty, Paul Terry, and the Smith brothers Robin and Chris.

The 1989 season saw make his debut in List A one-day cricket against Worcestershire at Bournemouth in the Refuge Assurance League, alongside six appearances in the County Championship. With several Hampshire players on international duty during the 1990 season, Middleton had his breakthrough season in the Hampshire side, making eighteen first-class appearances. In these, he scored 1,238 runs at an average of 47.61, with five centuries and a highest score of 127. He played the same number of first-class matches the following season, though his returns were more modest with 864 runs at an average of 29.79. Middleton played in two winning one-day finals in the 1991 NatWest Trophy and the 1992 Benson & Hedges Cup, joint top-scoring (78) with Robin Smith in the former. Middleton scored 1,780 runs at an average of nearly 50 in first-class cricket during the 1992 season, making six centuries during the season. Amongst these was his career high-score of 221 against Surrey at Southampton, in which he shared in an opening-wicket stand of 267 alongside Paul Terry, which remains a Hampshire record for the first wicket against Surrey. His form in 1992 led to him being named The Cricket Society's Player of the Year and selection for that winter's England A tour to Australia.

He did not meet with success on the tour and his form in the proceeding seasons dropped. He made twelve and thirteen first-class appearances in the 1993 and 1994 seasons respectively, scoring over 500 runs and averaging in the mid-twenties in both. In his final season in 1995, he featured in just two first-class matches, against Warwickshire in the County Championship, and the touring West Indians. In total, Middleton made 105 first-class appearances for Hampshire, scoring 5,665 runs at an average of 34.75; he made thirteen centuries and 24 half centuries. In one-day cricket, he made 61 appearances, scoring 2,139 runs at an average of 39.61; though he did not make a century in one-day cricket, he did make twenty half centuries, with a highest score of 98.

== Coaching career ==
Middleton retired during the 1995 season to take up a coaching role at Hampshire. He was placed in charge of the Hampshire Academy upon its foundation in September 1998, and was concurrently its Cricket Development Officer. He held this role until he was appointed coach of the Hampshire Second XI in December 1999, with Mark Garaway replacing him. Alongside these roles, he played at club level for the Hampshire Academy, captaining them to promotion to the top division of the Southern Premier League. He also briefly played for the Hampshire Cricket Board in the MCCA Knockout Trophy in 1998, playing once against Buckinghamshire.

In January 2003, the England and Wales Cricket Board awarded Hampshire official academy status, with Middleton being appointed the academy's first director. His tenure as director lasted until January 2012, when he was elevated to work with the first team and was replaced as director by Bobby Parks. He is currently Hampshire's batting coach. Amongst the cricketers he has coached at Hampshire include his son, Fletcha, who is a current Hampshire player.
