= Mitchell Stokes =

English cricketer

Personal information
- Full name: Mitchell Samuel Thomas Stokes
- Born: 27 March 1987 (age 39); Basingstoke, Hampshire, England
- Nickname: Stokesy
- Height: 5 ft 8 in (1.73 m)
- Batting: Right-handed
- Bowling: Right-arm off break

Domestic team information
- Years: Team
- 2005–2009: Berkshire
- 2005–2007: Hampshire (squad no. 34)
- 2010–2011: Wiltshire

Career statistics
Competition	List A	Twenty20
Matches	5	14
Runs scored	53	179
Batting average	13.25	14.91
100s/50s	–/–	–/1
Top score	43	62
Balls bowled	24	6
Wickets	0	0
Bowling average	–	–
5 wickets in innings	–	–
10 wickets in match	–	–
Best bowling	–	–
Catches/stumpings	2/–	4/–
- Source: Cricinfo, 30 September 2009

Mitchell Samuel Thomas Stokes (born 27 March 1987) is an English former cricketer who played for Hampshire in List A one-day and Twenty20 cricket.

== Career with Hampshire ==
Stokes was born in Basingstoke in March 1987. He was educated at Cranbourne School, before progressing to Basingstoke College of Technology. Stokes progressed through the youth system at Hampshire under a scholarship, before touring India and Malaysia with the England Under-19 cricket team in January–February 2005, making three Test and One Day International apiece against the India under-19s. Stokes made his senior debut for Hampshire against Sussex at the Rose Bowl in the 2005 Twenty20 Cup, though the match was abandoned after inclement weather. He made five further appearances Twenty20 appearances that season for Hampshire, He made a further eight appearances in the 2006 Twenty20 Cup, opening the batting alongside Michael Carberry. In the 2006 Twenty20 Cup, Stokes scored 125 runs at an average of 15.62; his highest score that season, of 62, came against Middlesex, with Stokes sharing in an opening stand of 122 runs with Carberry. In the same season, he made his debut in List A one-day cricket against the West Indies A, with Stokes making four one-day appearances in 2006, followed by a single appearance against Essex in the 2007 Friends Provident Trophy. After finding his opportunities limited, Stokes decided to leave Hampshire following the 2007 season, in order to pursue opportunities at other first-class counties.

A hard-hitting batsman, he was utilised by Hampshire as a one-day specialist. In fourteen Twenty20 matches, he scored 179 runs at an average of 14.91. In five one-day appearances, he scored 53 runs at an average of 13.25, with a highest score of 36.

== After leaving Hampshire ==
After leaving Hampshire, he played minor counties cricket for Berkshire, having previously played for the county in the 2005 Minor Counties Championship and MCCA Knockout Trophy. Having played a handful of matches for Berkshire in 2008 and 2009, he subsequently joined Wiltshire, making six appearances in the 2010 Minor Counties Championship and eight appearances in the MCCA Knockout Trophy, spread over 2010 and 2011. He subsequently played club cricket in Staffordshire for Silverdale Cricket Club, scoring more than 3,800 runs and taking 268 wickets during his six seasons with the club. He briefly returned south, where he played for Basingstoke and North Hants in the Southern Premier Cricket League. In November 2019, he returned to Staffordshire, where he joined Bignall End Cricket Club in the Stone and District Cricket League.
