= Frank Marshall (priest) =

Anglican Dean of Barbados

Frank Marshall (1945 – 2017) was the Anglican Dean of Barbados, based at the Cathedral Church of Saint Michael and All Angels in Saint Michael, Barbados, where he served from his installment in 2005 until his retirement on 30 November 2015.
