= Mark Garaway =

English cricketer

Personal information
- Full name: Mark Garaway
- Born: 20 July 1973 (age 53); Swindon, Wiltshire, England
- Nickname: Garas
- Batting: Right-handed
- Role: Wicket-keeper

Domestic team information
- Years: Team
- 1996–1999: Hampshire (squad no. 6)
- 1997: Marylebone Cricket Club

Career statistics
Competition	First-class	List A
Matches	4	2
Runs scored	124	11
Batting average	24.80	5.50
100s/50s	–/1	–/–
Top score	55	7
Catches/stumpings	13/2	1/–
- Source: Cricinfo, 8 December 2009

Mark Garaway (born 20 July 1973) is an English cricket coach, who formerly played cricket at first-class level and was the analyst for the England cricket team.

== Playing career ==
Garaway was born at Swindon in July 1973. He was educated on the Isle of Wight at Sandown High School. He made his debut in first-class cricket for Hampshire against Cambridge University at Fenner's in 1996, in doing so he became the first professional cricketer from the Isle of Wight. He made his second first-class appearance the following year for the Marylebone Cricket Club against the touring Pakistan A cricket team at Shenley. In that same year, he made his debut in List A one-day cricket for Hampshire against Pakistan A at Southampton; he made a second List A appearance for Hampshire in the 1999 CGU National League against Gloucestershire at Southampton. He played a further two first-class matches for Hampshire, against the touring Sri Lankans in 1998 and the touring New Zealanders in 1999. In four first-class matches, Garaway scored 124 runs at an average of 24.80, with one half century score of 55. As a wicket-keeper, he took 13 catches and made two stumpings.

== Coaching career ==
Having played second choice wicket-keeper to Adrian Aymes, Garaway retired from playing at the end of the 1999 season to take over the role of cricket development officer at Hampshire in 2000, replacing Tony Middleton. He left Hampshire in October 2001 to take up the role of Somerset's Second XI coach and director of the England and Wales Cricket Board's South West region academy. He was appointed Somerset's first team coach for the 2005 season, before being appointed team analyst and assistant coach of England in February 2006, succeeding Tim Boon. Garaway left his role with England in July 2009, taking up an appointment with Cricket Ireland as their director of cricket operations, tasked with implementing development programmes to facilitate the growth of cricket in Ireland. He remained in his post with Cricket Ireland until July 2011, before leaving the role citing family reasons which necessitated their relocation back to England. Garaway is currently the director of cricket at Millfield School, having been appointed in 2012.
