= Alan Castell =

English cricketer

Personal information
- Full name: Alan Terry Castell
- Born: 6 August 1943; Oxford, Oxfordshire, England
- Died: 17 November 2024 (aged 81); Fordingbridge, Hampshire, England
- Batting: Right-handed
- Bowling: Leg break googly Right-arm medium

Domestic team information
- Years: Team
- 1961–1971: Hampshire

Career statistics
Competition	First-class	List A
Matches	112	30
Runs scored	1,622	148
Batting average	15.90	9.25
100s/50s	–/4	–/–
Top score	76	24
Balls bowled	14,832	1,571
Wickets	229	28
Bowling average	30.97	36.28
5 wickets in innings	8	–
10 wickets in match	1	–
Best bowling	6/22	4/52
Catches/stumpings	89/–	11/–
- Source: Cricinfo, 28 September 2009

Alan Terry Castell (6 August 1943 – 17 November 2024) was an English cricketer who played for Hampshire between 1961 and 1971 at both first-class and List A level. He began his career as a leg-break and googly bowler, but later switched to medium-pace. In 112 first-class appearances, he took nearly 230 wickets.

== Early cricket career ==
Castell was born at Oxford in August 1943. He first came to the attention of Hampshire coach Arthur Holt as a leg break googly bowler while playing for an Oxford juniors team in 1959, who invited Castell to join the Hampshire staff without a trial. Early in his career at Hampshire, he built a good relationship with Hampshire secretary Desmond Eagar, who once chastised him for the casual manner in which he addressed Hampshire president Harry Altham.

He made his debut for the Hampshire first eleven in a first-class match against Oxford University at Portsmouth in 1961. He appeared in the same fixture the following season, before making three appearances in the County Championship. Notably, against Surrey he shared in a partnership of 230 for the ninth wicket with Danny Livingstone, which as of 2026 remains a Hampshire record for that wicket; Castell contributed 76 runs to the partnership, which would become his highest first-class score. In the 1963 season, he made nine first-class appearances, taking 28 wickets at an average of 18.85; he took three five wicket hauls in these matches, with best figures of 5 for 46. His performances in 1963 led some critics to suggest Castell could be a Test hopeful. In the winter which followed the 1963 season, Castell toured the West Indies with the International Cavaliers, playing in two first-class matches against Jamaica at Kingston.

== Reinvention as a medium pacer ==
He played infrequently for Hampshire in 1964 and 1965, failing to live up to the early promise his leg break bowling had shown; the Australian Bill Alley had suggested that Castell was more promising than Richie Benaud was at the same age. He reinvented himself as a right-arm medium pace bowling ahead of the 1966 season, in which he made eleven first-class appearances, taking 36 wickets at an average of 22.55, which included two five wicket hauls and what were, at that point, his career best bowling figures of 6 for 49. In that same season, he also made his debut in List A one-day cricket against Worcestershire in the semi-final of the Gillette Cup. Over the following two seasons, he was largely ineffective, taking 12 and 19 wickets respectively in 1967 and 1968, at expensive averages. He made 22 first-class appearances in 1969, having his most successful season in terms of wickets, with 50 at an average of 25.90; amongst his three five wickets hauls that season were his career best figures of 6 for 22, taken against Somerset.

Castell again featured in 21 first-class matches in 1970, taking 43 wickets at an average of 39.86. Having played one-day intermittently since his 1966 debut in that format, he featured more prominently for Hampshire in one-day cricket during 1970, taking 12 wickets at an average of 38.16 from fourteen matches. In 1971, he featured in a further thirteen first-class matches, taking 27 wickets at an average of 30.88, while in one-day cricket he took 8 wickets from eight matches. Castell left Hampshire at the end of the 1971 season to pursue a career in the alcoholic drinks industry. From his debut in 1961, he made 110 first-class appearances for Hampshire, scoring 1,600 runs. With the ball, he took 225 wickets at an average of 30.68; he took a five wicket haul on eight occasions and once took ten-wickets in a match. In one-day cricket, he made thirty appearances and took 28 wickets at an average of 36.28, taking best figures of 4 for 52.

Away from county cricket, he played club cricket for Old Tauntonians. In the alcoholic drinks industry, he worked for The Distillers Company, which was responsible for marketing Gordon's Gin throughout the United Kingdom. He retired from the industry in the late 1990s.

Castrell died in November 2024, at the age of 81.

== Works cited ==
- Chalke, Stephen (1999). Caught in the Memory: County cricket in the 1960s. Bath: Fairfield Books. ISBN 9780953119615.
