= Australian cricket team in England in 2024 =

International cricket tour

	England	Australia
- Dates: 11 – 29 September 2024
Captains	Phil Salt (T20Is); Harry Brook (ODIs)	Mitchell Marsh (Note: Travis Head and Steve Smith captained Australia in the 2nd T20I and 5th ODI respectively.)

One Day International series
- Results: Australia won the 5-match series 3–2
Most runs	Harry Brook (312)	Travis Head (248)
Most wickets	Brydon Carse (8); Matthew Potts (8)	Adam Zampa (8)
- Player of the series: Travis Head (Aus)

Twenty20 International series
- Results: 3-match series drawn 1–1
Most runs	Liam Livingstone (124)	Travis Head (90)
Most wickets	Liam Livingstone (5)	Sean Abbott (5); Matthew Short (5)
- Player of the series: Liam Livingstone (Eng)

The Australia cricket team toured England in September 2024 to play the England cricket team. The tour consisted of five One Day International (ODI) and three Twenty20 International (T20I) matches. In July 2023, the England and Wales Cricket Board (ECB) confirmed the fixtures for the tour, as a part of the 2024 home international season.

== Squads ==
England		Australia	
ODIs	T20Is	ODIs	T20Is
Harry Brook (c); ~~Jos Buttler (c, wk)~~; Jofra Archer; ~~Gus Atkinson~~; Jacob Bethell; Brydon Carse; Jordan Cox (wk); Ben Duckett; ~~Josh Hull~~; Will Jacks; Liam Livingstone; Matthew Potts; Adil Rashid; Phil Salt (wk); Jamie Smith; Olly Stone; Reece Topley; John Turner	Phil Salt (c, wk); ~~Jos Buttler (c, wk)~~; Jofra Archer; Jacob Bethell; Brydon Carse; Jordan Cox (wk); Sam Curran; Josh Hull; Will Jacks; Liam Livingstone; Saqib Mahmood; Dan Mousley; Jamie Overton; Adil Rashid; Reece Topley; John Turner	Mitchell Marsh (c); Sean Abbott; Alex Carey (wk); Cooper Connolly; Ben Dwarshuis; Cameron Green; ~~Nathan Ellis~~; Jake Fraser-McGurk; Aaron Hardie; Josh Hazlewood; Travis Head; Josh Inglis (wk); Marnus Labuschagne; Glenn Maxwell; Matthew Short; Steven Smith; Mitchell Starc; Adam Zampa	Mitchell Marsh (c); Sean Abbott; Xavier Bartlett; Cooper Connolly; Tim David; ~~Nathan Ellis~~; Jake Fraser-McGurk; Cameron Green; Aaron Hardie; Josh Hazlewood; Travis Head; Josh Inglis (wk); ~~Spencer Johnson~~; Marcus Stoinis; Adam Zampa

On 15 August 2024, Spencer Johnson was ruled out of the T20I series with a side-strain, Sean Abbott was named as his replacement. On 6 September 2024, Nathan Ellis was ruled out of the series due to hamstring injury. On 13 September 2024, Xavier Bartlett was ruled out of the remainder of the T20I series due to side strain. On 16 September 2024, Cooper Connolly and Ben Dwarshuis was added to the ODI squad and Mahli Beardman was named as travelling reserve. On 27 September 2024, Cameron Green was ruled out of the remainder ODI matches due to back injury.

On 5 September 2024, Jos Buttler was ruled out of the T20I series with a calf injury, and Phil Salt was announced as the captain. Jamie Overton was added to the T20I squad, while Jordan Cox was added to the ODI squad as cover. On 9 September 2024, Gus Atkinson was withdrawn from the ODI squad, Olly Stone was named as his replacement. On 15 September 2024, Jos Buttler was ruled out of the ODI series due to injury, and Harry Brook was announced as the captain. Josh Hull was also ruled out from the ODI series due to quad injury, Liam Livingstone was added to the ODI squad as his replacement.

== T20I series ==
=== 1st T20I ===
11 September 2024
18:30 (N)
Scorecard

Australia; 179 (19.3 overs)	v	England; 151 (19.2 overs)
Travis Head 59 (23); Liam Livingstone 3/22 (3 overs)		Liam Livingstone 37 (27); Sean Abbott 3/28 (3.2 overs)

Australia won by 28 runs
Rose Bowl, Southampton
Umpires: Russell Warren (Eng) and Alex Wharf (Eng)
Player of the match: Travis Head (Aus)

- England won the toss and elected to field.
- Jacob Bethell, Jordan Cox and Jamie Overton (Eng) all made their T20I debuts.
- Phil Salt captained England in T20Is for the first time.

=== 2nd T20I ===
13 September 2024
18:30 (N)
Scorecard

Australia; 193/6 (20 overs)	v	England; 194/7 (19 overs)
Jake Fraser-McGurk 50 (31); Liam Livingstone 2/16 (3 overs)		Liam Livingstone 87 (47); Matthew Short 5/22 (3 overs)

England won by 3 wickets
Sophia Gardens, Cardiff
Umpires: Mike Burns (Eng) and Alex Wharf (Eng)
Player of the match: Liam Livingstone (Eng)

- England won the toss and elected to field.
- Travis Head captained Australia in T20Is for the first time.
- Matthew Short (Aus) took his first five-wicket haul in T20Is.

=== 3rd T20I ===
15 September 2024
14:30
Scorecard

England	v	Australia

Match abandoned
Old Trafford, Manchester
Umpires: Mike Burns (Eng) and Martin Saggers (Eng)

- No toss.
- No play was possible due to rain.

== ODI series ==
=== 1st ODI ===
19 September 2024
12:30 (D/N)
Scorecard

England; 315 (49.4 overs)	v	Australia; 317/3 (44 overs)
Ben Duckett 95 (91); Marnus Labuschagne 3/39 (6 overs)		Travis Head 154* (129); Jacob Bethell 1/20 (3 overs)

Australia won by 7 wickets
Trent Bridge, Nottingham
Umpires: Kumar Dharmasena (SL) and Alex Wharf (Eng)
Player of the match: Travis Head (Aus)

- England won the toss and elected to bat.
- Jacob Bethell (Eng) and Ben Dwarshuis (Aus) both made their ODI debuts.
- Harry Brook captained England in ODIs for the first time.
- Travis Head scored the highest ODI score (154*) by an Australian in England.

=== 2nd ODI ===
21 September 2024
11:00
Scorecard

Australia; 270 (44.4 overs)	v	England; 202 (40.2 overs)
Alex Carey 74 (67); Brydon Carse 3/75 (10 overs)		Jamie Smith 49 (61); Mitchell Starc 3/50 (9.2 overs)

Australia won by 68 runs
Headingley, Leeds
Umpires: Russell Warren (Eng) and Joel Wilson (WI)
Player of the match: Alex Carey (Aus)

- England won the toss and elected to field.
- Adil Rashid (Eng) took his 200th wicket in ODIs.

=== 3rd ODI ===
24 September 2024
12:30 (D/N)
Scorecard

Australia; 304/7 (50 overs)	v	England; 254/4 (37.4 overs)
Alex Carey 77* (65); Jofra Archer 2/67 (10 overs)		Harry Brook 110* (94); Cameron Green 2/45 (6 overs)

England won by 46 runs (DLS method)
Riverside Ground, Chester-le-Street
Umpires: Kumar Dharmasena (SL) and Alex Wharf (Eng)
Player of the match: Harry Brook (Eng)

- England won the toss and elected to field.
- Rain prevented any further play.
- England were 46 runs ahead of the DLS par score of 208 runs from 37.4 overs.
- Harry Brook (Eng) scored his first century in ODIs.

=== 4th ODI ===
27 September 2024
12:30 (D/N)
Scorecard

England; 312/5 (39 overs)	v	Australia; 126 (24.4 overs)
Harry Brook 87 (58); Adam Zampa 2/66 (8 overs)		Travis Head 34 (23); Matthew Potts 4/38 (8 overs)

England won by 186 runs
Lord's, London
Umpires: Martin Saggers (Eng) and Joel Wilson (WI)
Player of the match: Harry Brook (Eng)

- Australia won the toss and elected to field.
- The match was reduced to 39 overs per side due to rain.

=== 5th ODI ===
29 September 2024
11:00
Scorecard

England; 309 (49.2 overs)	v	Australia; 165/2 (20.4 overs)
Ben Duckett 107 (91); Travis Head 4/28 (6.2 overs)		Matthew Short 58 (30); Brydon Carse 1/36 (5 overs)

Australia won by 49 runs (DLS method)
Bristol County Ground, Bristol
Umpires: Mike Burns (Eng) and Kumar Dharmasena (SL)
Player of the match: Travis Head (Aus)

- Australia won the toss and elected to field.
- Rain prevented any further play.
- Australia were 49 runs ahead of the DLS par score of 116 runs from 20.4 overs.
- Cooper Connolly (Aus) made his ODI debut.
