= English cricket team in Pakistan in 2024–25 =

International cricket tour

	Pakistan	England
- Dates: 7 – 28 October 2024
Captains	Shan Masood	Ben Stokes (Note: Ollie Pope captained England in the 1st Test.)

Test series
- Result: Pakistan won the 3-match series 2–1
Most runs	Saud Shakeel (280)	Harry Brook (373)
Most wickets	Noman Ali (20)	Jack Leach (16)
- Player of the series: Sajid Khan (Pak)

The England cricket team toured Pakistan in October 2024 to play three Test matches against Pakistan cricket team. The Test series formed part of the 2023–2025 ICC World Test Championship. The Pakistan Cricket Board (PCB) finalized the bilateral series as a part of the 2023–2027 ICC Future Tours Programme. In July 2024, the PCB confirmed the fixtures for the tour, as a part of the 2024–25 home international season.

On 20 September 2024, the PCB announced that the second Test would be held in Multan, due to ongoing renovation work at the National Stadium, Karachi in preparation for the 2025 ICC Champions Trophy. The option of moving one or more matches to the United Arab Emirates or Sri Lanka had been considered.

Worldwide broadcasting rights were awarded to a consortium led by TransGroup and ARY. In the United Kingdom, Sky Sports secured a late deal to broadcast the series live on television, whilst the BBC obtained the rights to provide radio coverage on Test Match Special.

In December 2022, during their previous tour of Pakistan, England won all three Test matches played. Only eight players from that tour were included in the 17-man squad for this series.

== Squads ==
Pakistan	England
Shan Masood (c); Saud Shakeel (vc); Abrar Ahmed (Note: In squad for first Test only.); Noman Ali; Mohammad Ali (Note: Not in squad for first Test.); Salman Ali Agha; Saim Ayub; Kamran Ghulam; Mir Hamza; Mohammad Huraira; Aamir Jamal; Haseebullah Khan (wk); Sajid Khan; Zahid Mahmood; Mehran Mumtaz; Mohammad Rizwan (wk); Abdullah Shafique	Ben Stokes (c); Ollie Pope (vc); Rehan Ahmed; Gus Atkinson; Shoaib Bashir; Harry Brook; Brydon Carse; Jordan Cox (wk); Zak Crawley; Ben Duckett; ~~Josh Hull~~; Jack Leach; Matthew Potts; Joe Root; Jamie Smith (wk); Olly Stone; Chris Woakes

On 26 September 2024, Josh Hull was ruled out of the series with a quad injury. On the same day, the PCB announced that Zahid Mahmood would join the Pakistan squad in training, but that it would be reduced in size to 15 players before the first Test. On 5 October, Ben Stokes was ruled out of the first Test due to the hamstring injury which had prevented him taking part in England's previous Test series against Sri Lanka. After taking charge of the side during that series, Ollie Pope was appointed captain for the fourth consecutive game. Olly Stone was unavailable for the first Test, having planned to return to the United Kingdom three days prior to his wedding on 12 October.

Shaheen Afridi, Sarfaraz Ahmed, Babar Azam and Naseem Shah were dropped by Pakistan prior to the second and third Tests, for which Abrar Ahmed was unavailable for selection as he was recovering from Dengue fever.

== Test series ==
The team of match officials for the series, headed by Richie Richardson as referee, was announced by the PCB on 3 October 2024.

=== 1st Test ===
7–11 October 2024
Scorecard

Pakistan	v	England
556 (149 overs); Shan Masood 151 (177); Jack Leach 3/160 (40 overs)		823/7d (150 overs); Harry Brook 317 (322); Saim Ayub 2/101 (14 overs)
220 (54.5 overs); Salman Ali Agha 63 (84); Jack Leach 4/30 (6.5 overs)

England won by innings and 47 runs
Multan Cricket Stadium, Multan
Umpires: Kumar Dharmasena (SL) and Sharfuddoula Saikat (Ban)
Player of the match: Harry Brook (Eng)

- Pakistan won the toss and elected to bat.
- Brydon Carse (Eng) made his Test debut.
- Ollie Pope (Eng) played in his 50th Test match.
- In Pakistan's first innings, Shan Masood passed 2,000 Test runs.
- Salman Ali Agha (Pak) scored his 1,000th run in Tests.
- Joe Root overtook Alastair Cook to become England's leading run-scorer in Test cricket. He registered a career-best Test score of 262 (off 375 balls) and became the first England player to reach 20,000 international runs in all formats.
- Joe Root and Harry Brook set a new record for the highest partnership for any wicket by an England pair (454). The partnership was the fourth-highest in Tests and a record for the fourth wicket.
- Harry Brook became the sixth England player to score a Test triple century, which, coming off 310 balls, was the second-fastest in Test history.
- England recorded the fourth-highest total in Tests.
- Pakistan's first innings total was the only one over 500 by a team that went on to lose a Test match by an innings.
- Abrar Ahmed was unable to participate in the final two days of the match due to illness.
- World Test Championship points: England 12, Pakistan 0.

=== 2nd Test ===
15–18 October 2024
Scorecard

Pakistan	v	England
366 (123.3 overs); Kamran Ghulam 118 (224); Jack Leach 4/114 (38.3 overs)		291 (67.2 overs); Ben Duckett 114 (129); Sajid Khan 7/111 (26.2 overs)
221 (59.2 overs); Salman Ali Agha 63 (89); Shoaib Bashir 4/66 (19 overs)		144 (33.3 overs); Ben Stokes 37 (36); Noman Ali 8/46 (16.3 overs)

Pakistan won by 152 runs
Multan Cricket Stadium, Multan
Umpires: Kumar Dharmasena (SL) and Chris Gaffaney (NZ)
Player of the match: Sajid Khan (Pak)

- Pakistan won the toss and elected to bat.
- Kamran Ghulam became the 13th player to score a century on Test debut for Pakistan.
- Ben Duckett (Eng) passed 2,000 Test runs, with the highest strike rate (87.22) of any player to reach that mark.
- Sajid Khan and Noman Ali (Pak) were the first pair of bowlers to take all 20 wickets in a Test match since Dennis Lillie and Bob Massie for Australia in 1972 (also against England).
- Noman Ali's bowling figures in England's second innings were the second-best in a Test match in Pakistan.
- Shan Masood recorded his first win as captain of the Pakistan Test side.
- World Test Championship points: Pakistan 12, England 0.

=== 3rd Test ===
24–26 October 2024
Scorecard

England	v	Pakistan
267 (68.2 overs); Jamie Smith 89 (119); Sajid Khan 6/128 (29.2 overs)		344 (96.4 overs); Saud Shakeel 134 (223); Rehan Ahmed 4/66 (17.4 overs)
112 (37.2 overs); Joe Root 33 (52); Noman Ali 6/42 (18.2 overs)		37/1 (3.1 overs); Shan Masood 23* (6); Jack Leach 1/27 (2 overs)

Pakistan won by 9 wickets
Rawalpindi Cricket Stadium, Rawalpindi
Umpires: Chris Gaffaney (NZ) and Sharfuddoula Saikat (Ban)
Player of the match: Saud Shakeel (Pak)

- England won the toss and elected to bat.
- Zak Crawley (Eng) played in his 50th Test match.
- For the first time since 1882, no seam bowlers were used during the opening innings of a Test match.
- Saud Shakeel scored the most singles (70) ever recorded in reaching a Test hundred.
- World Test Championship points: Pakistan 12, England 0
