= Sri Lankan cricket team in England in 2024 =

International cricket tour

	England	Sri Lanka
- Dates: 21 August – 10 September 2024
Captains	Ollie Pope	Dhananjaya de Silva

Test series
- Result: England won the 3-match series 2–1
Most runs	Joe Root (375)	Kamindu Mendis (267)
Most wickets	Chris Woakes (13)	Asitha Fernando (17)
- Player of the series: Joe Root (Eng) and Kamindu Mendis (SL)

The Sri Lanka cricket team toured England in August and September 2024 to play three Test matches against the England cricket team. The Test series formed part of the 2023–2025 ICC World Test Championship. In July 2023, the England and Wales Cricket Board (ECB) confirmed the fixtures, as a part of the 2024 home schedule.

== Squads ==
England	Sri Lanka
Ollie Pope (c); ~~Ben Stokes (c)~~; Harry Brook (vc); Gus Atkinson; Shoaib Bashir; Jordan Cox (wk); Ben Duckett; Josh Hull; Dan Lawrence; Matthew Potts; Joe Root; Jamie Smith (wk); Olly Stone; Chris Woakes; Mark Wood	Dhananjaya de Silva (c); Kusal Mendis (vc, wk); Dinesh Chandimal (wk); Asitha Fernando; Vishwa Fernando; Prabath Jayasuriya; Dimuth Karunaratne; Lahiru Kumara; Nishan Madushka; Angelo Mathews; Kamindu Mendis; Ramesh Mendis; Pathum Nissanka; Kasun Rajitha; Milan Rathnayake; Sadeera Samarawickrama (wk); Nisala Tharaka; Jeffrey Vandersay

On 13 August 2024, England captain Ben Stokes was ruled out with a hamstring injury and Ollie Pope was named as the captain, and Harry Brook named as his deputy. On 25 August 2024, Mark Wood was ruled out of the remainder of the Test series due to a muscle strain, Josh Hull was named as his replacement.

== Tour match ==
14–17 August 2024
Scorecard

Sri Lanka	v	England Lions
139 (43.5 overs); Dimuth Karunaratne 26 (38); Zaman Akhter 5/32 (11.5 overs)		324 (89.2 overs); Hamza Shaikh 91 (204); Prabath Jayasuriya 5/102 (31.2 overs)
306 (87.1 overs); Nishan Madushka 77 (88); Farhan Ahmed 3/87 (29 overs)		122/3 (26.5 overs); Rob Yates 57* (75); Dhananjaya de Silva 2/37 (8.5 overs)

England Lions won by 7 wickets
New Road, Worcester
Umpires: Rob Bailey (Eng) and Graham Lloyd (Eng)

- England Lions won the toss and elected to field.
- No play was possible before lunch on day 1 due to rain and wet outfield.
- No play was possible after tea on day 2 due to rain.
- Farhan Ahmed and Hamza Shaikh (England Lions) both made their first-class debuts.

== Test series ==
=== 1st Test ===
21–25 August 2024 (Note: While five days of play were scheduled for each Test, all three Tests reached a result in four days.)
Scorecard

Sri Lanka	v	England
236 (74 overs); Dhananjaya de Silva 74 (84); Chris Woakes 3/32 (11 overs)		358 (85.3 overs); Jamie Smith 111 (148); Asitha Fernando 4/103 (18 overs)
326 (89.3 overs); Kamindu Mendis 113 (183); Matthew Potts 3/47 (17.3 overs)		205/5 (57.2 overs); Joe Root 62* (128); Asitha Fernando 2/25 (12 overs)

England won by 5 wickets
Old Trafford, Manchester
Umpires: Chris Gaffaney (NZ) and Paul Reiffel (Aus)
Player of the match: Jamie Smith (Eng)

- Sri Lanka won the toss and elected to bat.
- No play was possible before lunch on day 2 due to rain.
- Milan Rathnayake (SL) made his Test debut.
- Ollie Pope captained England in Tests for the first time.
- Jamie Smith (Eng) scored his first century in Tests.
- World Test Championship points: England 12, Sri Lanka 0.

=== 2nd Test ===
29 August – 2 September 2024
Scorecard

England	v	Sri Lanka
427 (102 overs); Joe Root 143 (206); Asitha Fernando 5/102 (24 overs)		196 (55.3 overs); Kamindu Mendis 74 (120); Matthew Potts 2/19 (11 overs)
251 (54.3 overs); Joe Root 103 (121); Asitha Fernando 3/52 (13 overs)		292 (86.4 overs); Dinesh Chandimal 58 (62); Gus Atkinson 5/62 (16 overs)

England won by 190 runs
Lord's, London
Umpires: Joel Wilson (WI) and Paul Reiffel (Aus)
Player of the match: Gus Atkinson (Eng)

- Sri Lanka won the toss and elected to field.
- Gus Atkinson (Eng) scored his first century in Tests.
- Joe Root scored his 34th Test century, the most by an England player, and took his 200th catch in Tests.
- Gus Atkinson became the third Englishman to score a century and take a five wicket haul in the same test.
- World Test Championship points: England 12, Sri Lanka 0.

=== 3rd Test ===
6–10 September 2024
Scorecard

England	v	Sri Lanka
325 (69.1 overs); Ollie Pope 154 (156); Milan Rathnayake 3/56 (13.1 overs)		263 (61.2 overs); Dhananjaya de Silva 69 (111); Olly Stone 3/35 (9 overs)
156 (34 overs); Jamie Smith 67 (50); Lahiru Kumara 4/21 (21 overs)		219/2 (40.3 overs); Pathum Nissanka 127* (124); Gus Atkinson 1/44 (11 overs)

Sri Lanka won by 8 wickets
The Oval, London
Umpires: Chris Gaffaney (NZ) and Joel Wilson (WI)
Player of the match: Pathum Nissanka (SL)

- Sri Lanka won the toss and elected to field.
- Josh Hull (Eng) made his Test debut.
- Dimuth Karunaratne (SL) scored his 7,000th run in Tests.
- World Test Championship points: Sri Lanka 12, England 0.

== Statistics ==
=== Most runs ===
Rank	Runs	Player	Teams	Innings	Average	High Score	100	50
1	375	Joe Root	(England)	6	75.00	143	2	1
2	280	Jamie Smith	(England)	6	46.66	111	1	1
3	267	Kamindu Mendis	(Sri Lanka)	5	53.40	113	1	2
4	217	Pathum Nissanka	(Sri Lanka)	4	72.33	127*	1	1
5	204	Dananjaya de Silva	(Sri Lanka)	5	40.80	74	-	3
Last Updated: 10 September 2024

=== Most wickets ===
Rank	Wickets	Player	Teams	Innings	Best	Average	Economy	5w
1	17	Asitha Fernando	(Sri Lanka)	6	5/102	24.64	4.23	1
2	13	Chris Woakes	(England)	6	3/32	19.30	2.76	-
3	12	Gus Atkinson	(England)	6	5/62	27.41	4.24	1
4	11	Lahiru Kumara	(Sri Lanka)	4	4/21	24.72	4.64	-
5	10	Milan Rathnayake	(Sri Lanka)	6	3/56	32.10	4.15	-
Last Updated: 30 September 2024

New Zealand cricket team in Sri Lanka in 2024–25
