= Josh Hull =

Josh Hull may refer to:

- Josh Hull (American football)
- Josh Hull (cricketer)
