= Grenville Wilson =

English cricketer

Personal information
- Born: 9 April 1932; Elmley Lovett, Worcestershire, England
- Died: 17 May 2019 (aged 87); Droitwich, Worcestershire, England
- Batting: Left-handed
- Bowling: Left-arm fast

Career statistics
Competition	First-class
Matches	13
Runs scored	10
Batting average	1.11
100s/50s	0/0
Top score	4*
Balls bowled	1,458
Wickets	18
Bowling average	55.55
5 wickets in innings	0
10 wickets in match	0
Best bowling	3/42
Catches/stumpings	2/0
- Source: CricInfo, 17 August 2022

Grenville Thomas Owen Wilson, registered at birth as Thomas Grenville Owen Wilson (9 April 1932 – 17 May 2019), was an English first-class cricketer who played 13 matches for Worcestershire in the early 1950s.

== Personal life ==
He is distantly related to Josh Hull who plays as a fast bowler for the England team. Wilson is the great-uncle of Hull's mother.
