= Joe Root =

English cricketer (born 1990)

Joe Root MBE
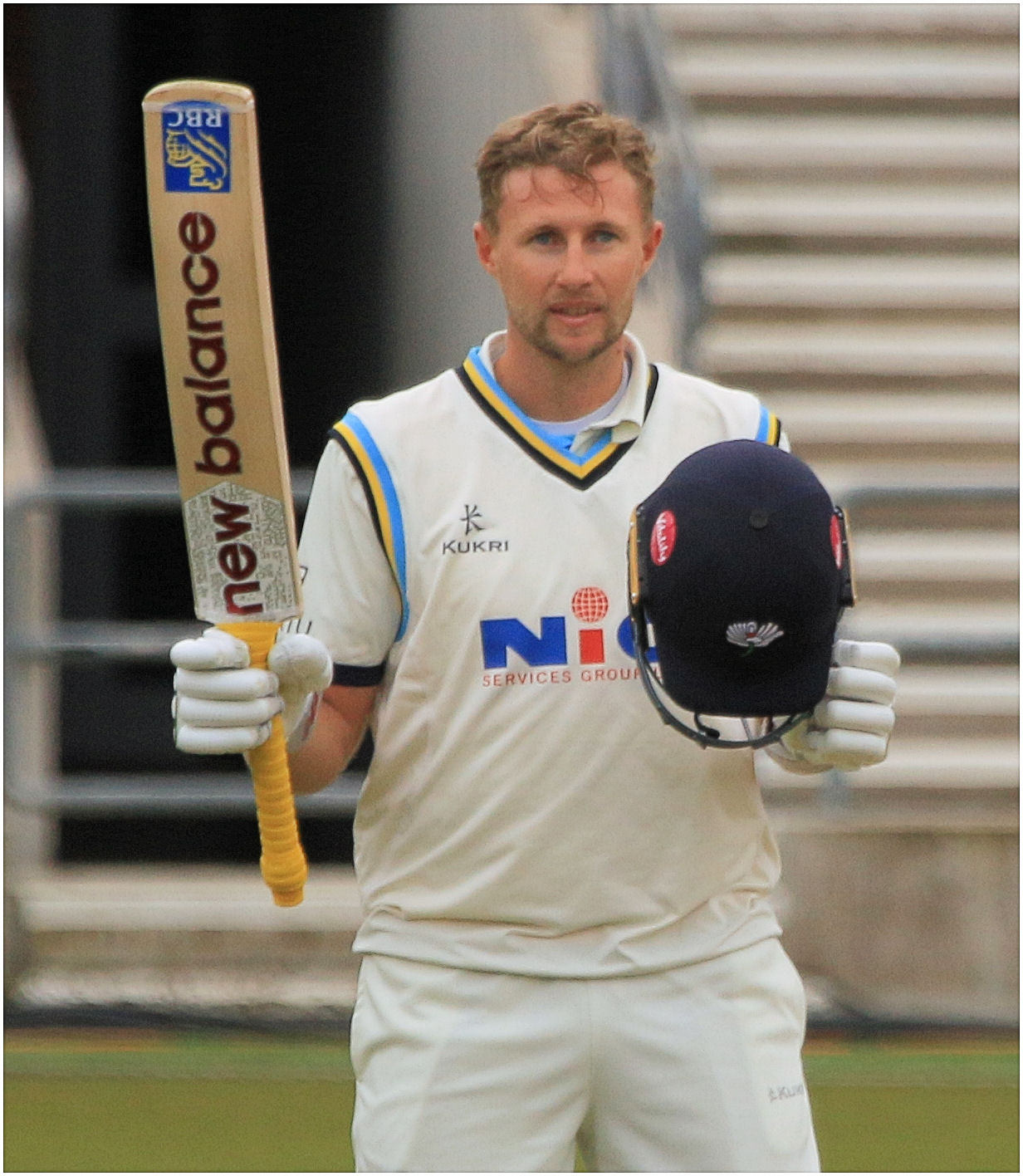
- Root in 2024

Personal information
- Full name: Joseph Edward Root
- Born: 30 December 1990 (age 35); Sheffield, South Yorkshire, England
- Height: 6 ft 0 in (1.83 m)
- Batting: Right-handed
- Bowling: Right-arm off break
- Role: Top-order batter
- Relatives: Billy Root (brother)

International information
- National side: England (2012–present)
- Test debut (cap 655): 13 December 2012 v India
- Last Test: 9 September 2026 v Pakistan
- ODI debut (cap 227): 11 January 2013 v India
- Last ODI: 18 November 2026 v Australia
- ODI shirt no.: 66
- T20I debut (cap 63): 22 December 2012 v India
- Last T20I: 5 May 2019 v Pakistan
- T20I shirt no.: 66

Domestic team information
- Years: Team
- 2009–present: Yorkshire
- 2018/19: Sydney Thunder
- 2021–2025: Trent Rockets
- 2023: Dubai Capitals
- 2023: Rajasthan Royals
- 2024/25: Paarl Royals
- 2026: Welsh Fire

Career statistics
Competition	Test	ODI	FC	LA
Matches	169	202	246	240
Runs scored	14,278	8,101	19,661	9,314
Batting average	50.45	50.00	49.90	48.25
100s/50s	41/69	20/50	55/93	21/58
Top score	262	166*	262	166*
Balls bowled	6,332	1,842	9,319	2,405
Wickets	74	32	108	45
Bowling average	48.09	57.21	47.18	51.28
5 wickets in innings	1	0	1	0
10 wickets in match	0	0	0	0
Best bowling	5/8	3/52	5/8	3/52
Catches/stumpings	220/–	98/–	277/—	110/–
Medal record
Men's cricket
Representing England
ICC Cricket World Cup
Winner	2019 England and Wales
ICC T20 World Cup
Runner-up	2016 India
ICC Champions Trophy
Runner-up	2013 England and Wales
- Source: ESPNcricinfo, 18 November 2026

Joseph Edward Root (born 30 December 1990) is an English international cricketer who plays for England in Tests and ODIs. He is the current captain of the Test team, reappointed in 2026 having previously held the role from 2017 to 2022. He plays for Yorkshire in English domestic cricket. Root is currently the leading run-scorer among active batsmen, the second highest run-scorer of all time in Test cricket and the highest run scorer for England. Root is widely regarded as one of the greatest cricketers of his era and among the finest England has produced. He was part of the England team that won the 2019 Cricket World Cup, where he top scored for England. As of June 2026, he has topped the ICC rankings for Test batsmen on eleven occasions.

Root made his Test debut in 2012, his ODI debut in 2013 and played for the England Twenty20 International team between 2012 and 2019. He captained England's Test team between February 2017 and April 2022, and holds the records for most Test matches (65), wins (28) as England captain. On the occasion of England's 1,000th Test in 2018, Root was named in the country's greatest all-time Test XI by the England and Wales Cricket Board. He was named both the ICC Men's Test Cricketer of the Year and the Wisden Leading Cricketer in the World for 2021.

A right-handed batsman, Root originally played as an opener but has played the majority of his cricket for England in the middle order. He is both England's highest run-scorer in Tests and in ODIs. He holds the record for both most Test (41) and most ODI (20) centuries for England. In June 2022, he became the second batsman for England, and fourteenth overall, to score 10,000 Test runs. Along with Harry Brook, he holds the world record for highest fourth-wicket stand (and fourth highest overall) in Tests (454), and with James Anderson the highest tenth-wicket partnership (198). He is also England's leading run scorer in the ICC World Cup and the only English player to score over 1000 runs in the competition. Root also bowls occasional off spin, and regularly fields at first slip, holding the record for most Test catches by an outfield player. As of July 2026, Root is one of only 2 players, along with AB de Villiers, to have a career batting average of 50+ in both Tests and ODI's in the history of international cricket.

== Early life and career ==
Root is the eldest son of Helen and Matt Root and grew up in Dore, Sheffield. His younger brother Billy plays cricket for Glamorgan. Root attended Dore Primary and King Ecgbert School in Sheffield, and at 15, on a cricket sports scholarship, Worksop College as a weekly boarder.

Root followed in his father’s footsteps by joining Sheffield Collegiate CC, in Abbeydale Park. Former Yorkshire batsman and England captain Michael Vaughan also plied his trade at Collegiate and was a source of inspiration for Root, who became a protégé of his. Root won Player of the Tournament in the prestigious Bunbury Festival. Root is a supporter of Sheffield United F.C.

== Domestic career ==
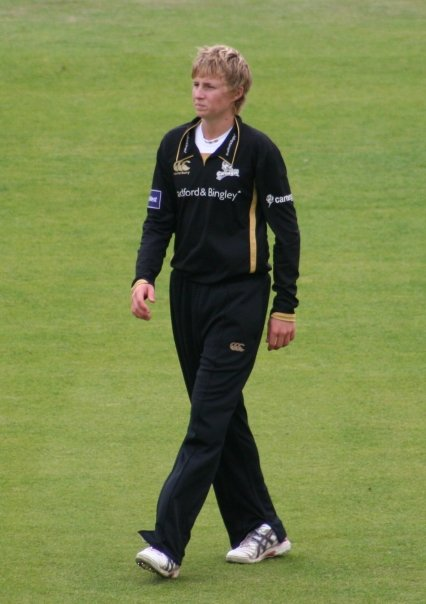
Root on his Yorkshire debut in 2009

Root made his Yorkshire second team debut on 18 July 2007 against Derbyshire at Abbeydale Park. He scored 57, putting on a 133 first-wicket stand with Adam Lyth. He continued to represent the academy team and was named player of the tournament as Yorkshire’s Academy won the ProARCH Trophy in Abu Dhabi. After success at second team level, Root was given an opportunity in the first team in Yorkshire’s final Pro40 match of the season at Headingley against Essex. Root scored 63 and was top-scorer in Yorkshire’s 187–7. Although his half-century could not inspire Yorkshire to victory, Root described his debut as a "dream come true".

After another man of the series performance, this time on England Under-19 duty in Bangladesh, Root signed a three-year professional contract with Yorkshire. Root was selected for the Under-19 Cricket World Cup in New Zealand, making an unbeaten 70 in a victory against Hong Kong as England progressed to the quarter-finals before being eliminated by the West Indies. Later that winter, he was sent to the Darren Lehmann Cricket Academy in Adelaide, South Australia, to fine tune his game.

In 2011, Root’s County Championship debut against Worcestershire at New Road in April was one of 15 matches he played that year on top of his England Lions cricket team debut against Sri Lanka A. At Scarborough in August, he scored his maiden Championship hundred against Sussex. Root captained Yorkshire in the match that they won the 2014 County Championship title and helped them retain it the following year.

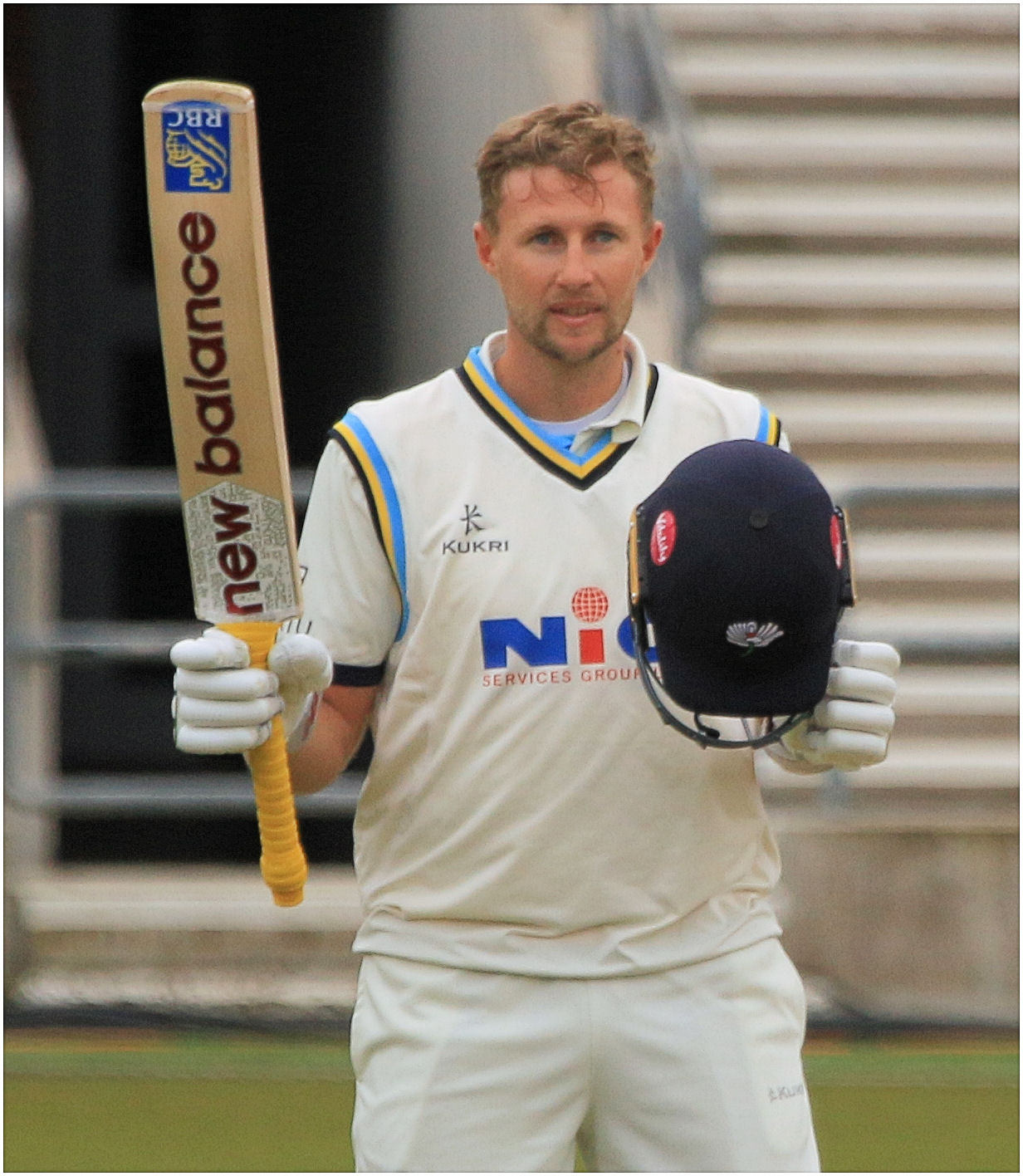
Root celebrates after scoring a century for Yorkshire (2024).

In April 2022, Root was retained by the Trent Rockets for the 2022 season of The Hundred. and on 23 December 2022 he was bought by Rajasthan Royals in the IPL 2023 auction.

== Early international career ==
=== 2012–13: England debut ===
In the fourth Test against India, Root became the 655th player to represent England at Test level, receiving his cap from former England all-rounder Paul Collingwood. Coming in as the number six batsman rather than his usual position as an opener, he scored 73 from 229 balls, top-scoring jointly with Kevin Pietersen. In the second innings he made 20 not out to help England bat out the match and secure a first Test series win on Indian soil since 1984-85.

Root made his T20 debut in the second of a two-match series that followed, although he was not required to bat. He was also included in the ODI squad after Jonny Bairstow withdrew. Root was not required to bat on his ODI debut either, but did bowl nine overs, collecting figures of 0-51, as England won by nine runs. He made scores of 36 and 39 in the next two matches, before making his maiden ODI fifty in the fourth match of the series, although England lost by five wickets. Root finished the series with 163 runs.

Following the successful tour of India, Root was retained in the Test squad for the tour of New Zealand and was added to the previously announced ODI and T20 squads. After being an unused batsman in the third T20, he started the ODI series with two half-centuries, contributing 56 in the first game before top-scoring with 79 off 56 balls in the second. In doing so, Root became the first batsman to start his ODI career with six consecutive scores of over 30 and finished the series with 163 runs.

In the Test series, Root continued to bat in the middle-order and in the third Test he made 45 off 176 balls before being bowled by Tim Southee. The series ended 0-0 and Root finished the series with 88 runs.

=== 2013–14: New Zealand, Champions Trophy and back-to-back Ashes series ===
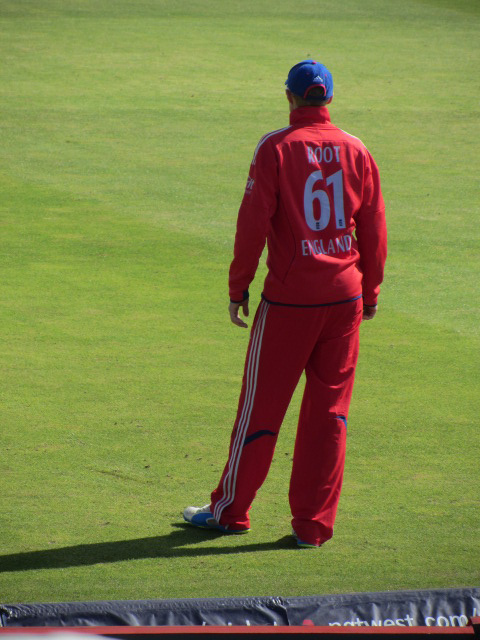
Root in 2013

New Zealand travelled to England in the summer of 2013 and Root’s first involvement was to captain the England Lions against the Black Caps in a four-day warm-up match, where he scored 179 runs. After scoring 40 and 71 runs in the first Test at Lord’s, Root scored his maiden Test century at his home ground of Headingley, hitting 104 runs off 167 balls and became the first Yorkshire player to score their first Test century at Headingley. He finished the series as England’s top scorer with 243 runs and helped his team to a 2–0 series victory. In the ODI series that followed, Root made scores of 30, 28 and 33 as England lost the series 2–1.

Root was named in the England squad for the Champions Trophy. He featured against Sri Lanka and hit 68 runs off 55 balls in a seven-wicket loss. Root helped England to a 10-run win over New Zealand by making 38 runs off 40 balls, which secured them a place in the semi-finals. In the last four against South Africa, Root scored 48 off 71 balls as England eased to a seven-wicket win and advanced to the final. Following England’s loss to India, he was named as 12th man in the Team of the Tournament by the ICC.

Root was asked to opening the batting with captain Alastair Cook for the Ashes after the selectors decided to drop Nick Compton from the England team. In the first Test he made scores of 30 and 5, and took his first Test wicket when he had Ed Cowan caught in the second innings. In the second innings of the second Test, Root made 180 before England declared to set Australia a target of 583. In the final innings Root took the wickets of Usman Khawaja and Australia captain Michael Clarke in consecutive overs with both batters well set on 50-plus scorers. This saw Root named Man of the Match for his performance with bat and ball. England retained the Ashes after a drawn third Test and victory in the fourth saw the series won, though Root did not contribute significantly to either result. He top-scored for England in the final Test to finish the series with 339 runs.

Root was selected to bat at number four for the first T20I, with Australia setting England 249 to win. Root came in with England 37-3 and scored a career-best 90 not out from 49 balls, but this was not enough to prevent a 39-run defeat. Root also played in the second game, which England won, to split the series. England lost the ODI series 2–1, with Root finishing the series with 36 runs from four matches.

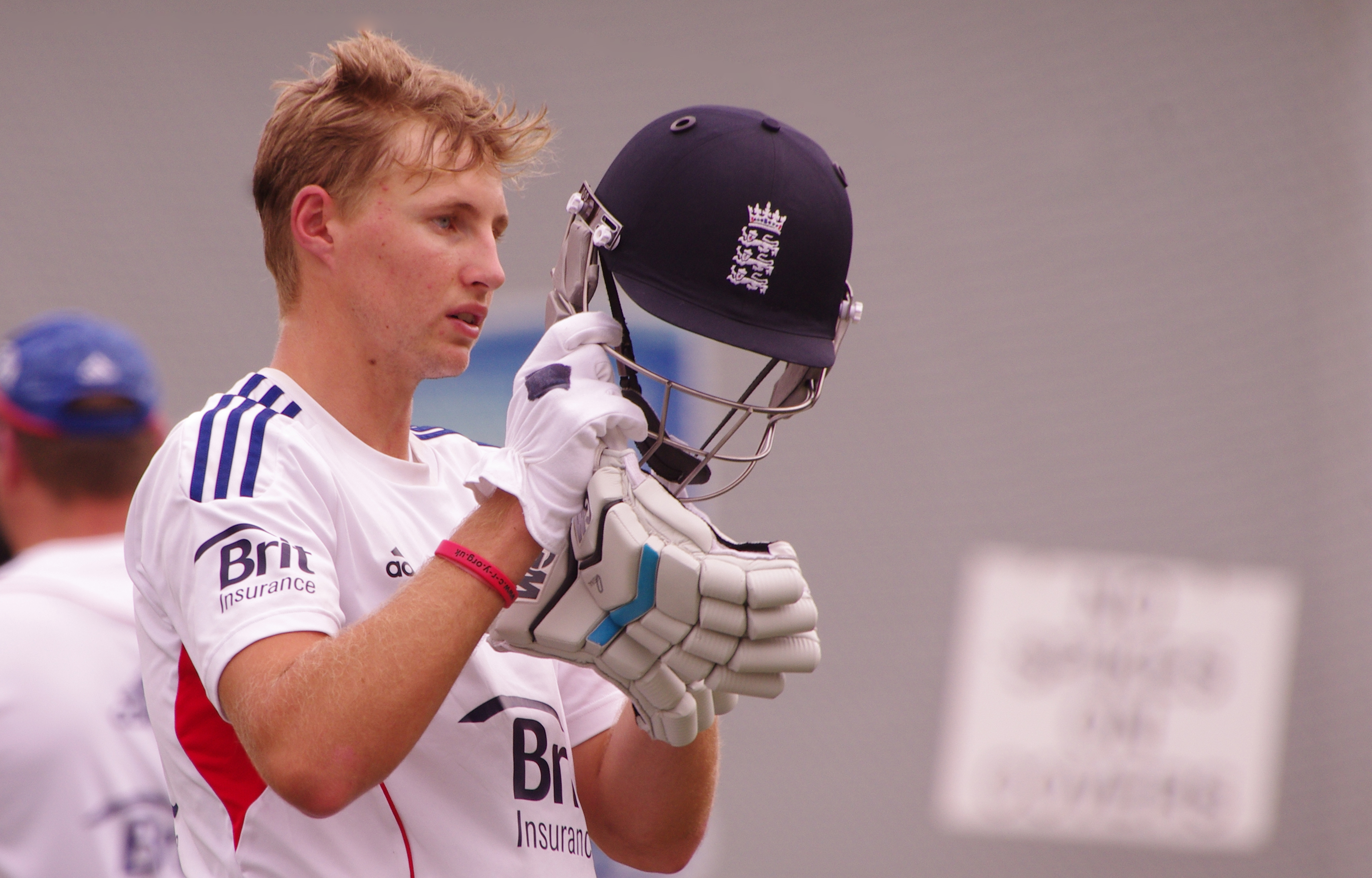
Root in training in Australia

Root was selected for the return Ashes in Australia. He was moved back to number six for the first Test with Michael Carberry given the opening batsman role alongside Alastair Cook. Root only managed two runs from seven balls in the first innings before being caught off a Mitchell Johnson delivery. In the second innings Root made 26 not out off 86 balls before running out of partners as England collapsed to defeat. The second Test saw Root move up to number three, filling the spot vacated by Jonathan Trott, who had returned home due to a stress related illness. He scored only 15 runs, which was the third highest number of runs scored by an England batsman in the first innings, in a collapse by England. However, Root’s second innings showed some fight as he top scored with 87 and was unfortunate not to make a century. England went on to lose and trailed 2–0. Root was out controversially for just four in the first innings of the third Test and made 19 in the second as England lost the match and as a result relinquished the Ashes. When England lost the fourth Test, Root was dropped for the final Test, with Yorkshire teammate Gary Ballance making his Test debut. England went on to lose the series 5-0 and Root finished the series with 192 runs.

Root batted at three in the first ODI, however, he only made three runs before getting out LBW. He managed to take the wicket of David Warner as Australia cruised to a six-wicket victory. England kept faith despite Root’s waning form and he played in the second ODI, but only made two runs before Mitchell Johnson trapped him in front. Root did contribute with the ball by taking the wickets of Shaun Marsh and Michael Clarke. Root was dropped for third and fourth ODIs due to his poor run of scoring, but returned for the final match, adding 55 from 86 balls. Root finished the series part of a team that lost 4–1, making 60 runs.

Root was named in the T20 team and in the first match made 32 off 24 before being caught by Aaron Finch. In the second T20 he made 18 runs in another loss, England finishing the series 3-0 losers. Root scored 61 runs in three matches.

=== 2014: West Indies, Sri Lanka & India ===
Root was picked in the squad for the 2014 tour of West Indies. He was selected for the first ODI, he took the wicket of Kieran Powell before making 37 runs off 48 balls in England's failed attempt to chase the score. In the second ODI Root took 2 wickets before hitting 23 runs off 43 balls in the successful run chase. Root batted at number 4 in the third ODI where he made his maiden ODI century hitting 107 runs off 122 balls and also taking 1 wicket in England's 25 run win. For this performance, Root was named Man of the Match and also received the Player of the Series award after contributing 167 runs (the highest run scorer of both teams) and 4 wickets. Due to sustaining a broken thumb in the final ODI, Root was ruled out of the 2014 ICC World Twenty20.

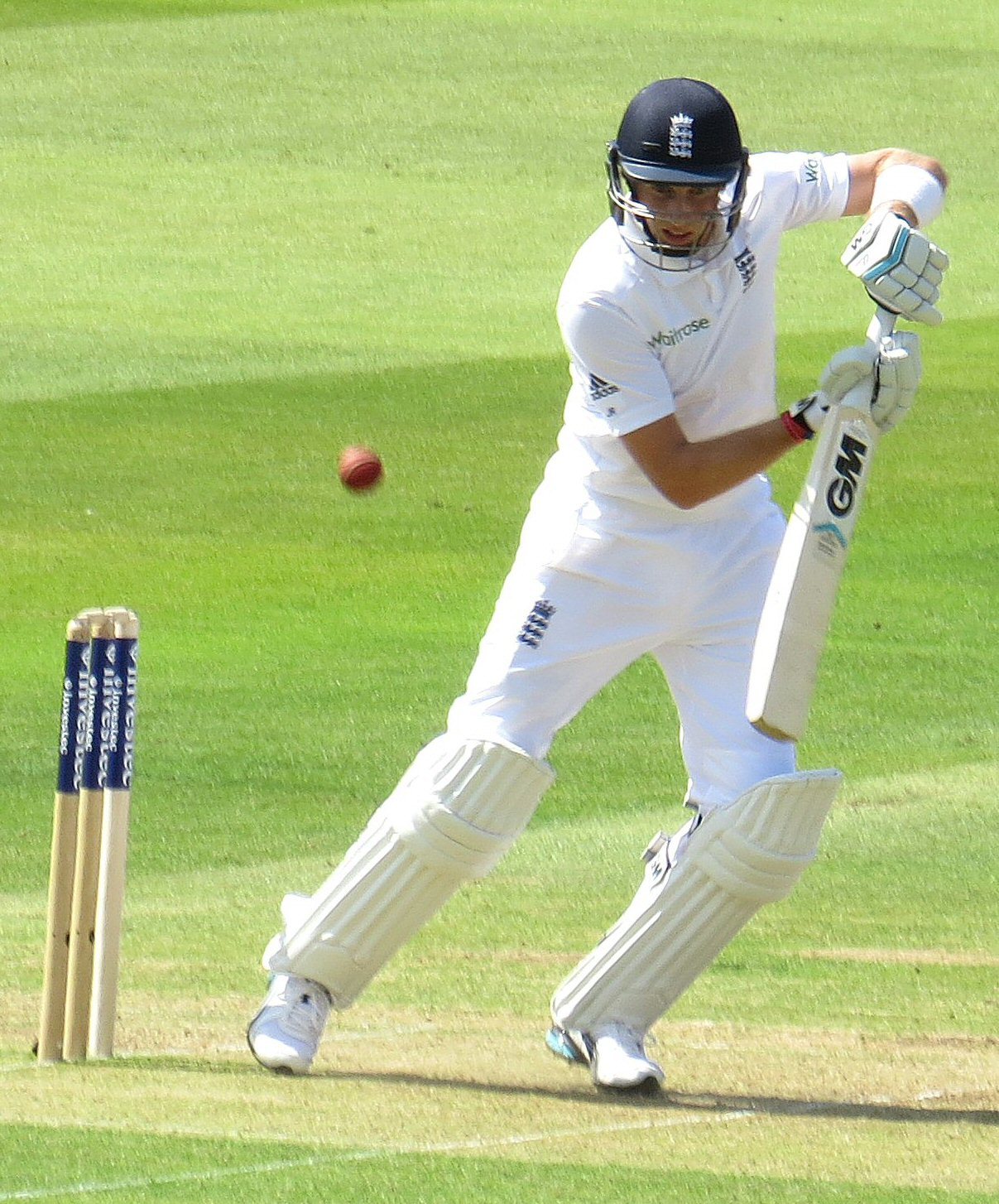
Joe Root batting against Sri Lanka at Lords, June 2014

During the first ODI against Sri Lanka as part of the Sri Lankan tour in 2014, Root made 45 runs and also took 1 catch in the 81 runs win. During the fourth ODI he made 43 off 68 balls in England's loss. England lost the series 3–2 and Root finished up with 98 runs.

Following the ODI series, in the first Test Match at Lords, Root scored an unbeaten 200 off 298 balls with 16 fours and guided England to their highest Test score against Sri Lanka of 575-9d. He is the fourth youngest English batsman to score a double century. The series finished 1–0 to Sri Lanka and Root top scored for England with 259 runs.

Root scored his 4th Test century for England in the first Test Match against India at Trent Bridge. His unbeaten 154 helped England recover from 298–9 to post 496 as he and James Anderson shared a world record 10th wicket stand of 198. Although England went into the second innings with a lead, they were unable to force a result. In the second Test of the series, Root made 66 in England's second innings but was unable to prevent a defeat. In the third match of the series, Root made a quick fire 66 in England's second innings to help them force a result and level the series at 1–1. He hit yet another half century in the fourth Test, as England won by an innings to take a 2–1 series lead. In the final Test at the Oval, Root scored his 5th Test century scoring an unbeaten 149 to help England post a first innings score of 486 all out in reply to India's 148 all out. Root won the Man of the Match award for his performance in that Test. This resulted in England winning the match by an innings and secured a 3–1 series win. He finished the Test series with 518 runs and 1 wicket. For his performances in 2014, he was named in the World Test XI by the ICC.

Root had an indifferent time in the ODI series, after the first match was abandoned he made scores of 4 and 2 in the second and third ODI's. However, he made 44 in the fourth game before hitting a match winning 113 in the final game of the series. The series finished 3–1 to India and Root top scored for England making 163 runs.

Now an integral part of the English set-up, Root was selected in the 2014–15 tour to Sri Lanka to play in the 7 game ODI series. He put in a match of the match performance in the 5th ODI by making an unbeaten 104 and helping to guide England to a win that kept the series alive. In the sixth match of the series Root was again one of England's stand out performers, hitting 55. Despite this, England suffered another defeat meaning they trailed 4–2 in the series with just one game left to play. In the final game of the series, Root was again England's top scorer, this time hitting 80 although England went on to lose the match and the series 5–2.

=== 2015 ===
In the 2015 Cricket World Cup, Root scored five against Australia. 46 (out of England's total of 123) versus New Zealand, a single against Scotland. He made 121 against Sri Lanka and in doing so became the youngest English player to score a century at a World Cup. However, England again suffered a heavy defeat, this time by nine wickets.

Root was selected in the England squad for the 2015 West Indies tour. In the first Test Root continued his good run of form as he hit 83 in England's 399 first innings total. During the second innings Root scored his sixth consecutive half-century score in Tests by posting 59 before being bowled. He also bowled 13 overs and took the wickets of Darren Bravo and key man Shivnarine Chanderpaul in the last innings as the match was drawn. In the second Test Root scored his 6th Test century (also his first overseas) when he smashed 182* in 229 balls to help England reach a total of 464. This also took him past 2,000 Test runs. England wrapped the match up to win the Test and take a 1–0 lead in the series. For his performance Root was awarded the Man of the Match. He finished the series with 358 runs and 3 wickets.

In the first Test against New Zealand in 2015, Root continued his impressive form for England. He scored 98 in the first innings to help England recover from a precarious position to post 389. He again contributed in the second innings, scoring 84 to help put England in a strong position. He picked up a wicket in New Zealand's second innings as England won the match by 124 runs. In the second Test, Root was dismissed for one in the first innings and was then dismissed for a duck in the second as England lost the game, meaning the series was drawn at 1–1. He finished the Test series with 183 runs and 1 wicket.

Root was selected in a revamped ODI squad for the five-match series. In the first ODI, Root batted at 3 and scored his 5th ODI century hitting 104 off 78 balls to help England to a record 408/9 and a 210 run win. He performed more strongly in the third ODI, scoring 54, but England lost again, this time by 3 wickets. In the fourth ODI, he made his sixth ODI century by scoring 106* off 97 to help England chase a target of 350 to win the match and level the series. During this innings he passed 2,000 ODI career runs. In the fifth ODI he scored 4 in England's successful chase giving England a 3–2 series win. Root finished the series with 274 runs. In the only T20 match between the two teams he scored 68 as England went on to win by 56 runs.

Before the 2015 Ashes series began, Root was made England vice-captain. In the first Test he made a century on the first day of the Ashes series. He scored 134 off 166 balls, helping England to a total of 430. In the second innings he hit 60 runs and took the wickets of Mitchell Johnson and Mitchell Starc before making the winning catch, all of which earned him the man of the match award. England won the Test by 169 runs. In the second Test, He took the wickets of Steve Smith and Peter Nevill in the first innings. The third Test was positive for Root as he made 63 in the first innings to give England a lead before hitting 38* from 63 balls to chase England's target of 121 runs to win the Test. In the fourth Test, Root took three catches as Australia were all out for 60 in 18.3 overs, he then went on to score 130 (his eighth Test century) which made him the youngest ever English batsman to record three Ashes centuries and help England to a 3–1 Ashes win. After this Test, Root reached the number one position in the ICC Test batting rankings, overtaking AB de Villiers and Steve Smith. After helping England to win the series 3–2, Root was named Man of the Series. He finished the series as England's highest run scorer making 460 runs and taking 4 wickets.

In the first Test of the England tour to the UAE in 2015 to face Pakistan, Root came in at number 4 and managed to score 85 off 143 balls, to help England to a total of 598/9d. In the second innings England were set 99 to win, after a shuffle in the batting order Root came in at number 3 and finished 33* off 29 balls; however bad light stopped play with England needing 25 to win and the match ended as a draw. This performance elevated him from No. 3 in the ICC Player Rankings to No. 2 rising above AB de Villiers. During the second Test, Root scored 88 in the first innings and 71 the second innings which saw him climb to No. 1 on the ICC Player Rankings for a second time, rising above Steve Smith. This also took him past 3,000 Test runs. Root finished the series with 287 runs, though England succumbed to a 2–0 series loss. Having been reinstated to the ODI squad, Root batted at number 3 in the first ODI however he was out for 0. In the second ODI he supported Alex Hales's century with 63 from 77 balls to help England to a 95 run win. In the fourth scored another half century, this time hitting 71 runs from 71 balls in England's total of 355/5, as England went on to win the game by 84 runs. England finished a 3–1 series winner with Root scoring 145 runs.

Joe was not selected for the first T20I as England fielded an experimental team. However he was included in the second T20I and came in to bat at number 4 behind James Vince. Root made 20 runs off 16 balls in the narrow 3 run win. For the third T20, Root was promoted to bat at number 3 with Alex Hales being rested and James Vince opening. He scored 32 runs off 22 balls to help England to a total of 154/8. Pakistan reached this total and took the match to a Super Over which England won.

Root was selected for the England squad on the 2015–16 tour to South Africa, the first time he would face the team in a Test series. In the first Test of the series, Root made 24 off 37 balls in the first innings before being trapped lbw to Dane Piedt. During the second innings he scored a 73 off 128 balls to help England to a total of 326 and a 241 run win, taking a lead in the series. In the second Test, Joe scored 50 and 29 in a match where both teams passed 600 in the first innings. Root scored his 9th Test century, scoring 110 from 139 balls, in the third Test to help England to surpass South Africa's total of 313. In the second innings (chasing 73) he hit the winning runs to ensure England won the series. This marks the first time since 2004–05 that a team has won a series in South Africa. In the fourth and final Test, Root scored 76 off 128 balls to help England to a score of 342 all out in reply to South Africa's 475. He finished the series as a 2–1 winner and was England's second highest scorer with 386 runs. For his performances in 2015, he was again named in the World Test XI by the ICC.

In the first ODI, Root scored 52 from 58 balls to help back up Jos Buttler's century on the way to England's total of 399 (their then third highest ever One Day score). Root backed this up with his 7th ODI century scoring 125 in a losing effort in the third ODI. During the fourth ODI, Root scored 109, his second consecutive century, in another losing effort leaving the series drawn 2–2 coming into the fifth ODI. South Africa went on to win the series 3–2. Root finished as England's second highest scorer with 351 runs.

=== 2016 ===
Root was selected in the England squad for the 2016 ICC World Twenty20. He featured in the first match against the West Indies and scored 48 from 36 balls in a losing effort. In the second match against South Africa he scored 83 off 44 balls in England's record breaking chase of 230. Root was named man of the match for this effort. In England's narrow victory against Afghanistan, Root made 12 runs before being run out. In the final group match against Sri Lanka he managed to make 25 and take a crucial catch in England's 10 run win, ensuring their place in the semi-final. England faced New Zealand in the semi-final and were set to chase 154, Root scored 27* from 22 balls to secure a place in the final. In the final against the West Indies, Root scored 54 from 37 balls in England's 155–9 and took the key wickets of Chris Gayle and Johnson Charles. However this was not enough to secure a win. Root finished the tournament as the 3rd highest scorer with 249 runs. Joe Root became only the third player after Shahid Afridi and Marlon Samuels to score a fifty and to take at least a wicket in an ICC World T20 final.

In the second Test of the series against Pakistan, Root scored 254, the highest total of his Test career and the second-highest of any English player (third-highest overall) at Old Trafford. Root went on to receive the man of the match award for his performance as England levelled the series at 1–1. The third Test at Edgbaston was not as memorable, making just 3 in the first innings but then playing a resilient 62 in the second to help England to a total of 445/6 and eventually, a 141 run victory. The final Test was lost by 10 wickets and the series ended in a 2–2 draw. In the ODI series, Root made 61 in the first match as England recorded an opening victory. England won the second match, with Root scoring 89. In the third match, Root scored 85 as England broke the record for the highest ever ODI score, finishing on 444/3.

=== 2016–2017: India ===
Root made 124 in England's first innings of the first Test against India as England made 537, though the match ended in a draw. For his performances in 2016, he was named in the World Test XI by the ICC.

Root made scores of 90 not-out and 101 in the second and third ODIs of the away series against West Indies in March 2017, with England winning the series 3–0.Twin tons round off

Root was named as part of the 'Team of the Tournament' at the 2017 Champions Trophy by the ICC, after he finished as the fourth highest run-scorer with England making the semi-final.

== Test captaincy ==
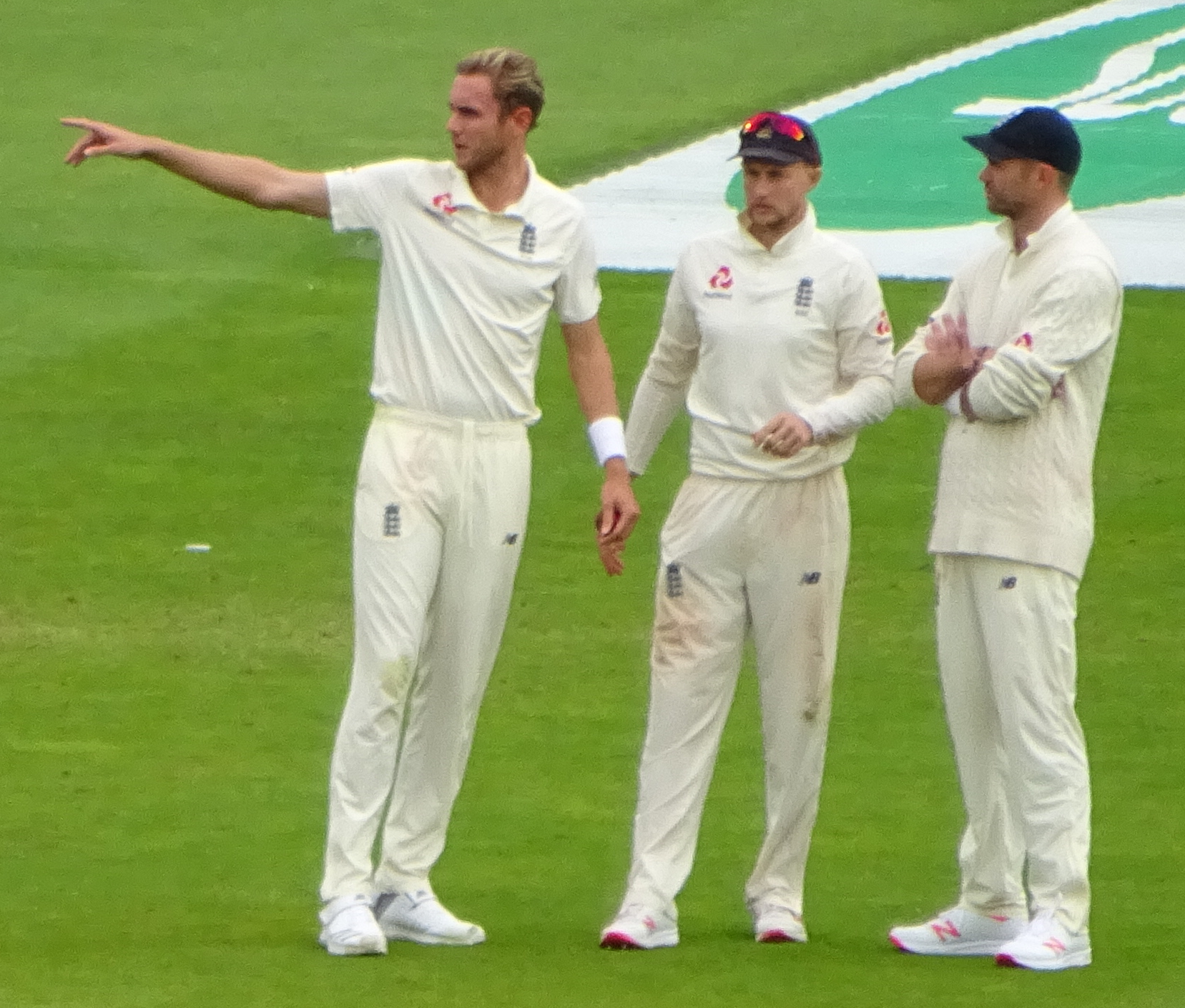
Root (centre) discusses tactics with bowlers Stuart Broad and Jimmy Anderson.

Root replaced Alastair Cook as the full-time Test captain on 13 February 2017 following the latter's resignation, making him England's 80th captain. In his first match as the captain, on 6 July 2017, against South Africa at Lord's, Root scored his 12th Test century with an innings of 190. He was the sixth (and highest scoring) England player to score a Test century on captaincy debut. He also had an influence on county teammate Gary Ballance's recall to the England squad. England won the match to set up a 3–1 series victory. A Test-series victory over West Indies followed, in the second Test of which Root equalled AB de Villiers' record of scoring a half-century in 12 consecutive Test matches.

=== Ashes series: 2017–18 ===
Root captained the English team in 2017–18 Ashes series in an unsuccessful defence of the Ashes, losing four of the five Tests. In Brisbane England batted first and scored 302 and 195, with Root's scores being 15 and 51. In the second Test at Adelaide Root's scored 9 and 67 out of totals of 227 and 233. In Perth, England scored 403 and 218, Root's scores 20 and 14, while Australia made 662/9 declared, winning the match and the series before tea on the final day. In the final match, he retired at 59 in the second innings after succumbing to gastroenteritis. He failed to convert any of his five half-centuries into centuries in the series. His next century did not come until 10 September 2018 against India at The Oval in the second innings, where Alastair Cook also scored a century on his final Test match.

=== 2018: Pakistan & India ===
England drew 1–1 at home to Pakistan in a two-match series.

England bounced back and beat India 4–1. Root failed to make a score in the first four Tests, but scored 125 in the last Test. This was his first century of 2018 after going without a century in the previous three Test series (Australia, New Zealand and Pakistan). This was also Root's last game with former captain Alistair Cook. Root impressed in the preceding ODI series against India, scoring 217 runs, which included two back-to-back centuries.

=== Sri Lanka: 2018 ===
Root became the first English captain to win a Test series in Sri Lanka since 2001, ending a run of 3 series in Sri Lanka without a win. He scored 124 in the 2nd Test to secure a series win; his first ever Test series away win as captain. This was also the first away Test series win England had won since 2016.

=== 2019: Cricket World Cup ===
In April 2019, he was named in England's squad for the 2019 Cricket World Cup. He had a good start to the tournament, scoring two centuries (against Pakistan and West Indies) and three fifties in England's first six matches. On 21 June 2019, in the match against Sri Lanka, Root played in his 250th international match for England.

He was named in the 'Team of the Tournament' for the 2019 World Cup by the ICC. They stated that "England's run machine over the years, Joe Root was the glue that held their famed batting together through the tournament. The Yorkshire batter finished as the fifth highest run-scorer of the tournament, with 556 runs from 11 innings. Root's flawless technique and ability to keep the scoreboard moving by rotating the strike and finding the boundaries when required makes him a perfect No. 3 in this line-up".

=== Ashes series: 2019 ===
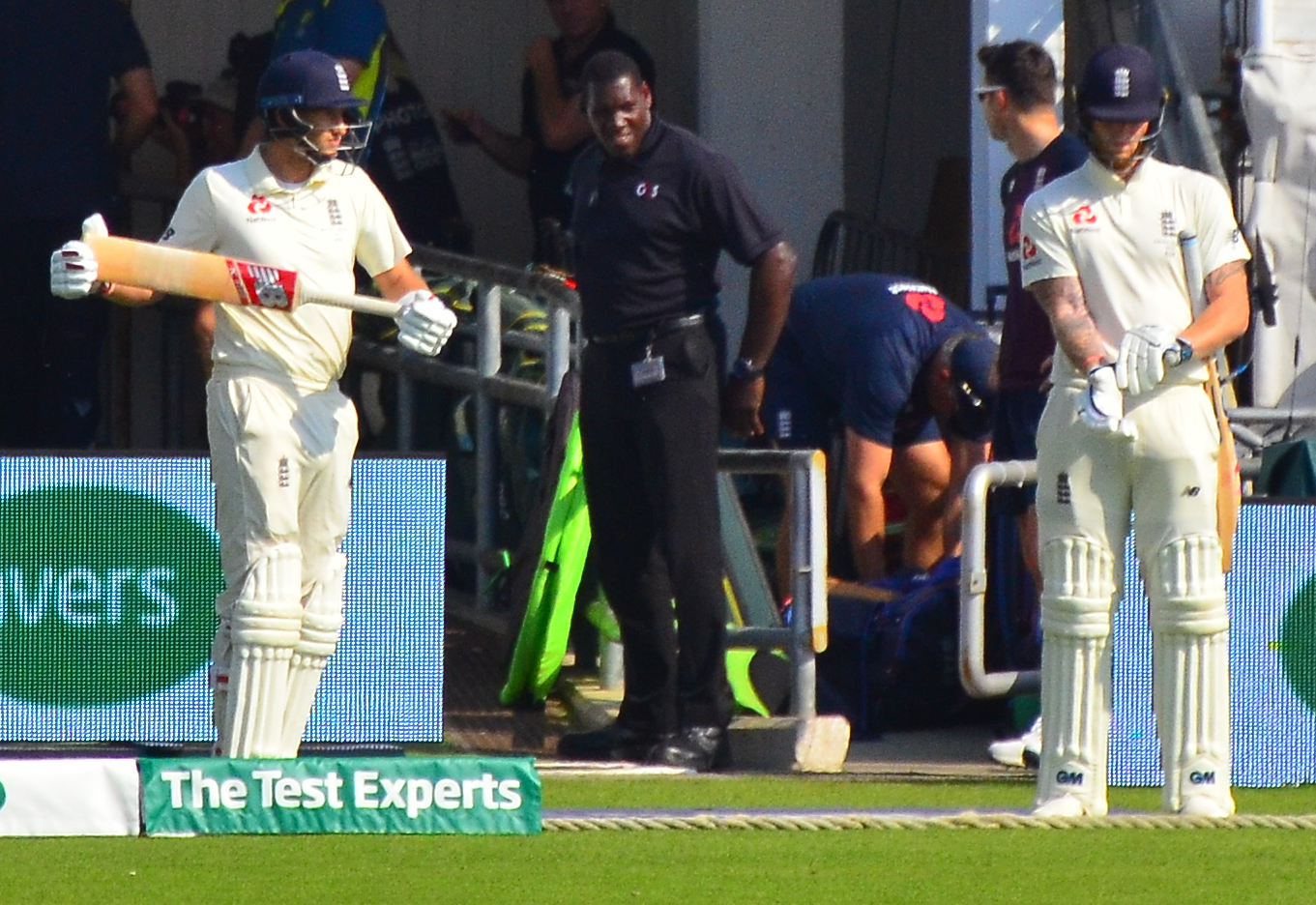
Root and Ben Stokes walk out to bat on the penultimate day of the 3rd Test at Headingley.

Root captained England in the 2019 Ashes Series, as England and Australia drew 2–2 with Australia retaining the Ashes. Root's batting position was widely discussed in the build-up to the series, with Root eventually moving up the order to bat at three. Root made a half century in the first Test as Australia won by 251 runs, while the second Test at Lord's was drawn, with Root making 14 and 0. Steve Smith, who made twin hundreds in the first Test and was a thorn in England's team throughout the previous Ashes series, missed the third Test with a concussion. England capitalised by levelling the series courtesy of an incredible one wicket win at Headingley, with Ben Stokes making 135* in a record fourth innings chase for England, Joe Root scoring 0 and 77.

Australia retained the Ashes with a 185 run victory at Old Trafford in the fourth Test, helped by a first innings double hundred from the returning Steve Smith, as Root made scores of 71 and 0. England restored some pride at the Oval with a 135 run victory to conclude the series, which was drawn 2–2. Root again made a half-century but failed to score a century in the series, leading to further criticism of Root's conversion rate. Root averaged just 32.50 throughout the series.

=== 2019–20: New Zealand & South Africa ===
In December 2019, in the second Test match against New Zealand, Root scored his first double century as captain of England, and became the first visiting captain to score a double century in New Zealand in Test cricket.

Root captained England to a 3–1 series victory in South Africa, which he described as his 'proudest result' as captain. England got off to a slow start, losing the first Test at Centurion, but came back to win the series comfortably. In the third Test he took career best bowling figures of 4–87 as England won on a turning Gqeberha pitch. Root had a consistent series with the bat, making three half-centuries, but was criticised once more for not converting his fifties into hundreds.

=== 2020: West Indies & Pakistan ===
In order to be present for the birth of his second child, Root missed the first Test of the three match series against West Indies. England lost the match; Root returned to captain the team to a 2–1 series victory, with his most significant innings being a score of 68 not out to set up a declaration in the final Test.

Root captained England to a second series win of the summer with a 1–0 win in the three Test series against Pakistan: England won the first Test followed by two rain-affected draws.

In November 2020, Root was nominated for the Sir Garfield Sobers Award for ICC Male Cricketer of the Decade and the award for Test cricketer of the decade.

=== 2021: Sri Lanka & India ===
Root led England for the two match Test series against Sri Lanka, which was previously postponed due to the COVID-19 pandemic. In the first Test, Root scored 228, his 18th Test century and his first for 13 months. For his efforts (which led to England winning by 7 wickets), he was named Man of the Match. Root's run of form continued into the second, where, by scoring 186, he became the first Englishman since David Gower to pass 150 in consecutive Tests. During the innings he also overtook Geoffrey Boycott, Kevin Pietersen and Gower to become the fourth-highest Test run-scorer for England. On 29 June 2021, in the opening fixture against Sri Lanka, Root played in his 150th ODI match. In the same match, Root also scored his 6,000th run in ODI cricket, making him the fourth fastest player (in terms of innings) to reach 6000 runs.

Later in the summer, Root continued his good form in Tests, with centuries in each of the first three games in the series against India seeing him return to the top of the ICC Test batting rankings. As a team England fared less well, trailing the series 2–1 when the final Test was postponed due to COVID-19.

=== 2021–22: Australia and West Indies ===
Root's good form did not continue into the 2021–22 Ashes series; though he was the leading run-scorer for England, he only managed three fifties and a top score of 89, as England lost the series 4–0. The result saw the sacking of Chris Silverwood as head-coach of the England team, and calls for Root to step down as captain. However, he was retained for the away series against West Indies, scoring a second-innings century in the drawn First Test, taking his tally of 100s to 24, and clear second place on the list of England Test centurions.

On 4 January 2022, at the fourth Ashes Test in Sydney, he captained England for the 60th time taking the record for the most Test matches as England captain. On 15 April 2022, having captained England 64 times, Root resigned as Test captain stating: "It has been the most challenging decision I have had to make in my career but having discussed this with my family and those closest to me; I know the timing is right".

== Post-captaincy ==
=== 2022–present ===
In the second innings of the first Test match of the 2022 series against New Zealand, he scored 115*, which helped England chase 277 runs and was awarded the Man of the Match. In the second Test match of the series, he scored 176 runs in the first innings. In the third Test match, he scored 86* in England's second innings to help England chase 296 runs. He scored 396 runs in six innings, at an average of 99 and was awarded the Player of the Series.

During the rescheduled fifth Test against India, Root scored the winning runs with his unbeaten 142. He finished the series with over 700 runs in five Tests.

In the following 2022 series against South Africa, Root had a rare quiet series with the bat, only scoring 50 runs across four innings with a top score of 23.

Root was named in the England squad for the 2023 Ashes Series in England. He subsequently hit his 30th test century with his 118 not out in the first innings at Edgbaston. England went on to lose the first and second tests in the series, with Root failing to make a score of note in the second test at Lord's. After England came out on top in the third test at Headingley, Root scored 84 and 91 in the 4th and 5th tests respectively helping England to draw the series.

On the third day of the first Test of the series against Pakistan at Multan in October 2024, Root overtook Sir Alastair Cook as England's highest Test run-scorer and moved into fifth place on the list of highest run-scorers in Test history. This was part of his highest Test score to date of 262, his sixth double-century, and in the same innings he shared an England record stand of 454 with Harry Brook. This was also a record for any fourth-wicket partnership in Tests.

In the subsequent series in India, Root came under heavy criticism during the third test at Rajkot for being dismissed playing a reverse scoop shot, with it being described by Scyld Berry as "the worst, most stupid, shot in the history of England's Test cricket". However, Root bounced back to hit 106* in the following match in Ranchi.

In the 2024 test series against Sri Lanka, Root equalled and then surpassed Alastair Cook's record for the most Test centuries by an England player, scoring his 33rd and 34th centuries in the first and second innings of the second Test at Lord's respectively.

Root moved into second place on the list of highest run-scorers in Test history on the third day of the fourth test against India at Manchester in July 2025.

On 4 December 2025, Root scored his first Test century in Australia, guiding England to 334 in the first innings of the second Test of the Ashes series at the Gabba.

== Return to captaincy ==
Root was temporarily made captain in the second Test of the 2026 series against New Zealand, in the absence of Ben Stokes, who was serving a suspension for an incident in a nightclub. On the 30th of July, Root was announced as permanent Test captain once again after Stokes' retirement.

== Personal life ==
Root married Carrie Cotterell on 1 December 2018. They have two children, born in 2017 and 2020.

== International centuries ==
Centuries against different nations
Opponent	Test	ODI	T20I
Afghanistan	—	1	—
Australia	6	—	—
Bangladesh	—	1	—
India	13	3	—
New Zealand	6	3	—
Pakistan	2	1	—
South Africa	2	3	—
Sri Lanka	6	3	—
West Indies	6	5	—
Total	41	20	—

Having scored 61 international centuries, Root currently is the sixth highest international century maker of all time.

== Awards ==
- ICC Men's Test Cricketer of the Year: 2021
- ICC Test Team of the Year: 2014, 2015, 2016, 2021, 2023, 2024
- Wisden Cricketer of the Year: 2014
- ICC ODI Team of the Year: 2015, 2018
- England Test Cricketer of the Year: 2015
- England Limited-Overs Cricketer of the Year: 2015
- Root was appointed Member of the Order of the British Empire (MBE) in the 2020 New Year Honours for services to cricket.
- ICC Player of the Month: August 2021
- PCA Player of the Year: 2021
- Wisden Leading Cricketer in the World: 2021

Awards
Preceded by Pat Cummins	ICC Test Player of the Year; 2021	Succeeded by Ben Stokes
