= Josh Hull (cricketer) =

English cricketer

Personal information
- Full name: Joshua Owen Hull
- Born: 20 August 2004 (age 22); Huntingdon, Cambridgeshire, England
- Height: 201 cm (6 ft 7 in)
- Batting: Left-handed
- Bowling: Left-arm fast medium
- Role: Bowler

International information
- National side: England
- Only Test (cap 716): 6 September 2024 v Sri Lanka

Domestic team information
- Years: Team
- 2023–present: Leicestershire (squad no. 20)
- 2024: Manchester Originals
- 2025: Welsh Fire

Career statistics
Competition	Test	FC	LA	T20
Matches	1	31	10	38
Runs scored	9	266	3	48
Batting average	9.00	14.00	—	12.00
100s/50s	0/0	0/1	0/0	0/0
Top score	7*	97	3*	12*
Balls bowled	102	3,450	454	723
Wickets	3	59	17	35
Bowling average	30.33	45.45	25.88	32.85
5 wickets in innings	0	0	0	0
10 wickets in match	0	0	0	0
Best bowling	3/53	3/13	4/43	3/28
Catches/stumpings	0/–	9/–	6/–	6/–
- Source: ESPNcricinfo, 26 September 2026

Joshua Owen Hull (born 20 August 2004) is an English cricketer who is a left-arm fast medium bowler. He plays international cricket for England at Test match level, and domestic cricket for Leicestershire. In October 2022, he signed a two-year deal with Leicestershire, after taking 28 wickets for the academy team during the 2022 season.

== Personal background ==
Hull was born on 20 August 2004 in Huntingdon and was educated at Stamford School. Although his great uncle, Grenville Wilson, had played some first-class cricket for Worcestershire in the 1950s, he had wanted to pursue a career in rugby until breaking his right arm at the age of 15. From a farming family, during the COVID lockdown of 2020, his grandmother had a barn converted into a temporary cricket net where he and his brother Ollie could practise. In March 2024, he cited Mitchell Starc as being a player he enjoyed watching and would like to emulate as a bowler.

== Career ==
Hull made his first-class debut on 6 April 2023, for Leicestershire against Yorkshire in the County Championship. and finished the match with bowling figures of 4/132. He made his List A debut on 3 August 2023, against Surrey in the One-Day Cup, and his Twenty20 debut on 2 June 2023, against Northamptonshire in the T20 Blast.

In August 2024, having made only 10 first-class appearances, Hull was included in the England Test squad ahead of the second of a three-match home series against Sri Lanka, after Mark Wood's further participation was ruled out due to injury. He was also made part of the England one-day and T20 squads set to face Australia that autumn. He was selected ahead of Matthew Potts for the final Test against Sri Lanka at the Oval, beginning on 6 September, when he was presented with his cap by Andrew Flintoff. England's ninth-youngest Test debutant, former England Test captain Mike Atherton commented in the Times that he was "as young and raw a fast bowler ever to have played for England". Having been identified by Brendon McCullum as "rough diamond", the England head coach explained before the game that Hull was picked for his future potential, and that he saw the player as "someone who is worth investing in" whatever his performance in the match. Hull's maiden Test wicket came on 7 September from his 15th delivery, with Chris Woakes taking a catch to help dismiss Pathum Nissanka.

Hull was included in England's 17-man Test squad for the team's subsequent three-match away series against Pakistan. He was later ruled out of the tour due to injury.
