= List of England Twenty20 International cricketers =

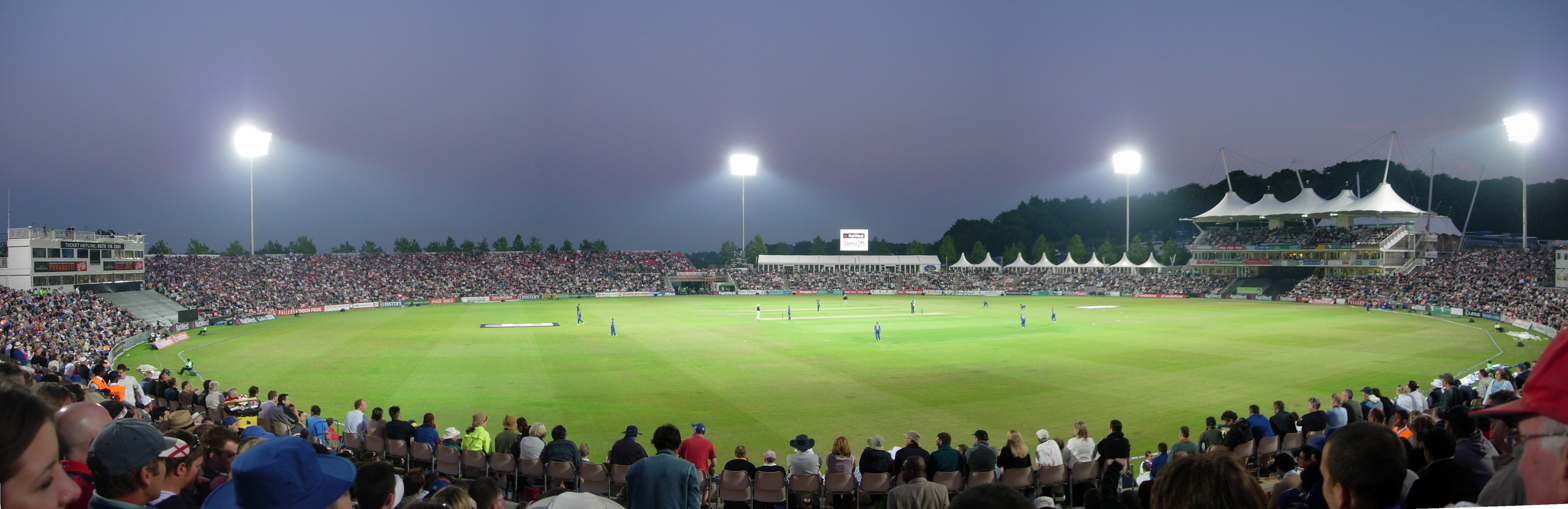
England playing Sri Lanka in a day-night Twenty20 International at the Rose Bowl, Hampshire on 15 June 2006

A Twenty20 International (T20I) is an international cricket match between two teams that have official T20I status, as determined by the International Cricket Council. It is played under the rules of Twenty20 cricket and is the shortest form of the game. The first such match was played on 17 February 2005 between Australia and New Zealand. The England cricket team played its first T20I match on 13 June 2005, against Australia as part of Australia's 2005 Ashes tour, winning the match by 100 runs.

This list is of all members of the England cricket team who have played at least one T20I match. The order is by each player name as they achieved a first Twenty20 cap; achievement by several players during the same match is arranged by surname alphabetically.

== Key ==
General

- ‡ – Captain
- † – Wicket-keeper
- First – Year of debut
- Last – Year of latest game
- Mat – Number of matches played

Batting

- Runs – Runs scored in career
- HS – Highest score
- Avg – Runs scored per dismissal
- * – Batsman remained not out
- 50 – Half-centuries scored (not including centuries)
- 100 – Centuries scored

Bowling

- Balls – Balls bowled in career
- Wkt – Wickets taken in career
- BBI – Best bowling in an innings
- Ave – Average runs per wicket

Fielding

- Ca – Catches taken
- St – Stumpings taken

== Players ==
Statistics are correct as of 19 September 2026.

General					Batting					Bowling				Fielding		Ref
No.	Name	First	Last	Mat	Runs	HS	Avg	50	100	Balls	Wkt	BBI	Ave	Ca	St	Ref
1	Paul Collingwood ‡	2005	2011	35	583	79	18.80	3	0	222	16	4/22	20.56	14	0	(Note: Paul Collingwood has also played Twenty20 International cricket for the ICC World XI. Only his record for England is given above.)
2	Andrew Flintoff	2005	2007	7	76	31	12.66	0	0	150	5	2/23	32.20	5	0	
3	Darren Gough	2005	2006	2	–	–	–	–	–	41	3	3/16	16.33	0	0	
4	Steve Harmison	2005	2006	2	–	–	–	–	–	39	1	1/13	42.00	1	0	
5	Geraint Jones †	2005	2006	2	33	19	33.00	0	0	–	–	–	–	2	0	
6	Jon Lewis	2005	2007	2	1	1	1.00	0	0	42	4	4/24	13.75	1	0	
7	Kevin Pietersen	2005	2013	37	1,176	79	37.93	7	0	30	1	1/27	53.00	14	0	
8	Vikram Solanki †	2005	2007	3	76	43	25.33	0	0	–	–	–	–	3	0	
9	Andrew Strauss ‡	2005	2009	4	73	33	18.25	0	0	–	–	–	–	1	0	
10	Marcus Trescothick	2005	2006	3	166	72	55.33	2	0	–	–	–	–	2	0	
11	Michael Vaughan ‡	2005	2007	2	27	27	13.50	0	0	–	–	–	–	0	0	
12	Tim Bresnan	2006	2014	34	216	47*	16.61	0	0	663	24	3/10	36.95	10	0	
13	Jamie Dalrymple	2006	2007	3	60	32	20.00	0	0	30	2	1/10	19.50	1	0	
14	Ed Joyce	2006	2007	2	1	1	1.00	0	0	–	–	–	–	0	0	(Note: Ed Joyce has also played Twenty20 International cricket for Ireland. Only his record for England is given above.)
15	Sajid Mahmood	2006	2009	4	1	1*	–	0	0	84	3	1/31	51.66	1	0	
16	Liam Plunkett	2006	2019	22	42	18	6.00	0	0	476	25	3/21	25.08	7	0	
17	Ian Bell	2006	2014	8	188	60*	26.85	1	0	–	–	–	–	4	0	
18	Stuart Broad ‡	2006	2014	56	118	18*	7.37	0	0	1,173	65	4/24	22.93	21	0	
19	Chris Read †	2006	2006	1	13	13	13.00	0	0	–	–	–	–	1	0	
20	Michael Yardy	2006	2011	14	96	35*	32.00	0	0	276	11	2/19	27.18	8	0	
21	James Anderson	2007	2009	19	1	1*	1.00	0	0	422	18	3/23	30.66	3	0	
22	Paul Nixon †	2007	2007	1	31	31*	–	0	0	–	–	–	–	0	1	
23	Monty Panesar	2007	2007	1	1	1	1.00	0	0	24	2	2/40	20.00	0	0	
24	Alastair Cook ‡	2007	2009	4	61	26	15.25	0	0	–	–	–	–	1	0	
25	Dimitri Mascarenhas	2007	2009	14	123	31	15.37	0	0	252	12	3/18	25.75	7	0	
26	Matt Prior †	2007	2010	10	127	32	21.16	0	0	–	–	–	–	6	3	
27	Owais Shah	2007	2009	17	347	55*	24.78	1	0	–	–	–	–	5	0	
28	Ryan Sidebottom	2007	2010	18	5	5*	–	0	0	367	23	3/16	19.00	5	0	
29	Jonathan Trott	2007	2010	7	138	51	23.00	1	0	–	–	–	–	0	0	
30	Darren Maddy	2007	2007	4	113	50	28.25	1	0	18	3	2/6	8.66	1	0	
31	Chris Schofield	2007	2007	4	24	9*	24.00	0	0	77	4	2/15	23.00	1	0	
32	Luke Wright	2007	2014	51	759	99*	18.97	4	0	330	18	2/24	25.83	14	0	
33	James Kirtley	2007	2007	1	2	2*	–	0	0	6	0	–	–	0	0	
34	Jeremy Snape	2007	2007	1	7	7	7.00	0	0	6	0	–	–	1	0	
35	Chris Tremlett	2007	2007	1	–	–	–	–	–	24	2	2/45	22.50	0	0	
36	Phil Mustard †	2008	2008	2	60	40	30.00	0	0	–	–	–	–	0	0	
37	Graeme Swann ‡	2008	2012	39	104	34	20.80	0	0	810	51	3/13	16.84	5	0	
38	Tim Ambrose †	2008	2008	1	–	–	–	–	–	–	–	–	–	1	1	
39	Ravi Bopara	2008	2014	38	711	65*	28.44	3	0	322	16	4/10	24.18	7	0	
40	Gareth Batty	2009	2009	1	4	4	4.00	0	0	18	0	–	–	0	0	
41	Steven Davies †	2009	2011	5	102	33	20.40	0	0	–	–	–	–	2	1	
42	Amjad Khan	2009	2009	1	2	2	2.00	0	0	24	2	2/34	17.00	0	0	(Note: Amjad Khan has also played Twenty20 International cricket for Denmark. Only his record for England is given above.)
43	James Foster †	2009	2009	5	37	14*	12.33	0	0	–	–	–	–	3	3	
44	Rob Key	2009	2009	1	10	10*	–	0	0	–	–	–	–	1	0	
45	Eoin Morgan ‡	2009	2022	115	2,458	91	28.58	14	0	–	–	–	–	46	0	
46	Adil Rashid	2009	2026	153	163	22	7.40	0	0	3,178	171	4/2	23.42	42	0	
47	Joe Denly	2009	2020	13	125	30	12.50	0	0	72	7	4/19	13.28	4	0	
48	Ajmal Shahzad	2010	2011	3	0	0*	–	0	0	66	3	2/38	32.33	1	0	
49	Craig Kieswetter †	2010	2012	25	526	63	21.91	3	0	–	–	–	–	17	3	
50	Michael Lumb	2010	2014	27	552	63	21.23	3	0	–	–	–	–	8	0	
51	Chris Woakes	2011	2023	33	147	37	16.33	0	0	611	31	3/4	26.51	12	0	
52	Jade Dernbach	2011	2014	34	24	12	4.80	0	0	702	39	4/22	26.15	8	0	(Note: Jade Dernbach has also played Twenty20 International cricket for Italy. Only his record for England is given above.)
53	Samit Patel	2011	2013	18	189	67	15.75	1	0	252	7	2/6	45.85	3	0	
54	Jos Buttler ‡†	2011	2026	163	4,384	131	34.79	30	2	–	–	–	–	100	22	
55	Alex Hales	2011	2022	75	2,074	116*	30.95	12	1	–	–	–	–	39	0	
56	Jonny Bairstow †	2011	2024	80	1,671	90	29.83	10	0	–	–	–	–	46	1	
57	Steven Finn	2011	2015	21	14	8*	–	0	0	480	27	3/16	21.59	6	0	
58	Ben Stokes	2011	2022	43	585	52*	21.66	1	0	612	26	3/26	32.92	22	0	
59	Scott Borthwick	2011	2011	1	14	14	14.00	0	0	24	1	1/15	15.00	1	0	
60	Danny Briggs	2012	2014	7	0	0*	–	0	0	108	5	2/25	39.80	1	0	
61	Stuart Meaker	2012	2012	2	–	–	–	–	–	47	2	1/28	35.00	1	0	
62	James Tredwell ‡	2012	2014	17	32	22	10.66	0	0	317	7	1/16	59.42	2	0	
63	Joe Root	2012	2019	32	893	90*	35.72	5	0	84	6	2/9	23.16	18	0	
64	Boyd Rankin	2013	2013	2	–	–	–	–	–	24	1	1/24	24.00	0	0	(Note: Boyd Rankin has also played Twenty20 International cricket for Ireland. Only his record for England is given above.)
65	Chris Jordan	2014	2024	95	439	36	13.71	0	0	1,953	108	4/6	26.36	48	0	
66	Moeen Ali ‡	2014	2024	92	1,229	72*	21.18	7	0	999	51	3/24	27.13	22	0	
67	Stephen Parry	2014	2015	5	1	1	1.00	0	0	96	3	2/33	46.00	2	0	
68	Michael Carberry	2014	2014	1	7	7	7.00	0	0	–	–	–	–	1	0	
69	Harry Gurney	2014	2014	2	–	–	–	–	–	48	3	2/26	18.33	0	0	
70	Jason Roy	2014	2022	64	1,522	78	24.15	8	0	–	–	–	–	19	0	
71	Sam Billings †	2015	2022	36	474	87	17.55	2	0	–	–	–	–	17	2	(Note: Sam Billings has also played Twenty20 International cricket for the ICC World XI. Only his record for England is given above.)
72	David Willey	2015	2022	43	226	33*	15.06	0	0	865	51	4/7	23.13	17	0	
73	Mark Wood	2015	2025	38	27	10*	13.50	0	0	776	54	3/9	20.24	5	0	
74	Reece Topley	2015	2024	35	17	9	8.50	0	0	706	33	3/22	29.63	6	0	
75	James Vince	2015	2022	17	463	59	27.23	2	0	–	–	–	–	7	0	
76	Liam Dawson	2016	2026	39	79	34	11.28	0	0	697	40	4/20	22.72	13	0	
77	Tymal Mills	2016	2023	15	8	7	2.66	0	0	304	14	3/27	32.92	2	0	(Note: Tymal Mills has also played Twenty20 International cricket for the ICC World XI. Only his record for England is given above.)
78	Mason Crane	2017	2017	2	–	–	–	–	–	48	1	1/38	62.00	0	0	
79	Tom Curran	2017	2021	30	64	14*	10.66	0	0	588	29	4/36	31.27	8	0	
80	Liam Livingstone	2017	2025	60	955	103	25.13	2	1	576	33	3/17	25.39	26	0	
81	Dawid Malan	2017	2023	62	1,892	103*	36.38	16	1	12	1	1/27	27.00	22	0	
82	Jake Ball	2018	2018	2	–	–	–	–	–	42	2	1/39	41.50	1	0	
83	Jofra Archer	2019	2026	51	129	21	11.72	0	0	1,126	68	4/33	23.00	15	0	
84	Ben Duckett	2019	2026	21	527	84	27.73	3	0	–	–	–	–	13	0	
85	Ben Foakes †	2019	2019	1	–	–	–	–	–	–	–	–	–	1	0	
86	Pat Brown	2019	2019	4	4	4*	–	0	0	78	3	1/29	42.66	2	0	
87	Sam Curran	2019	2026	80	744	58	21.25	2	0	1,359	73	5/10	26.91	31	0	
88	Lewis Gregory	2019	2021	9	45	15	7.50	0	0	78	2	1/10	58.50	0	0	
89	Saqib Mahmood	2019	2026	20	35	12	7.00	0	0	402	24	4/34	25.79	2	0	
90	Tom Banton †	2019	2026	43	797	73	26.56	5	0	–	–	–	–	31	0	
91	Matt Parkinson	2019	2022	6	5	5	1.25	0	0	120	7	4/47	28.28	1	0	
92	Harry Brook ‡	2022	2026	71	1,702	114*	36.21	8	2	–	–	–	–	41	0	
93	George Garton	2022	2022	1	2	2	2.00	0	0	24	1	1/57	57.00	0	0	
94	Phil Salt ‡†	2022	2026	65	1,852	141*	34.94	10	4	–	–	–	–	38	2	
95	Richard Gleeson	2022	2022	6	2	2	1.00	0	0	126	9	3/15	20.77	4	0	
96	Luke Wood	2022	2026	17	4	3	4.00	0	0	306	19	3/24	24.31	7	0	
97	Will Jacks	2022	2026	48	684	53*	22.06	1	0	338	22	3/14	22.63	18	0	
98	Olly Stone	2022	2022	1	0	0	0.00	0	0	24	0	–	–	0	0	
99	Rehan Ahmed	2023	2026	14	74	19*	14.80	0	0	228	15	3/39	24.06	3	0	
100	Brydon Carse	2023	2025	14	46	31	9.20	0	0	268	20	3/23	20.60	7	0	
101	Gus Atkinson	2023	2025	4	10	8*	10.00	0	0	65	6	4/20	20.33	1	0	
102	Jacob Bethell ‡	2024	2026	36	786	105	30.23	4	1	93	8	4/11	16.87	18	0	
103	Jordan Cox	2024	2025	9	100	55	20.00	1	0	–	–	–	–	7	0	
104	Jamie Overton	2024	2026	27	88	19	8.80	0	0	413	31	3/18	17.22	19	0	
105	Dan Mousley	2024	2024	4	8	8	8.00	0	0	54	2	2/29	41.00	4	0	
106	John Turner	2024	2024	2	–	–	–	–	–	36	1	1/42	64.00	0	0	
107	Jamie Smith †	2025	2025	5	130	60	26.00	0	0	–	–	–	–	1	0	
108	Matthew Potts	2025	2025	1	–	–	–	–	–	24	2	2/48	24.00	0	0	
109	Sonny Baker	2025	2026	4	–	–	–	–	–	95	6	3/12	16.00	0	0	
110	Josh Tongue	2026	2026	5	–	–	–	–	–	120	8	4/28	23.50	0	0	
111	Aneurin Donald	2026	2026	3	46	21	15.33	0	0	–	–	–	–	1	0	

== Captains ==
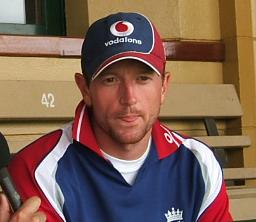
Paul Collingwood has captained the team in 30 Twenty20 international matches, the third most of any England T20I captain after Eoin Morgan and Jos Buttler.

England T20I captains
No.	Name	First	Last	Matches	Won	Lost	Tied	No Result	Win%
1	Michael Vaughan	2005	2007	2	1	1	0	0	50.00
2	Andrew Strauss	2006	2009	3	0	3	0	0	0.00
3	Paul Collingwood	2007	2011	30	17	11	0	2	60.71
4	Alastair Cook	2009	2009	1	0	1	0	0	0.00
5	Stuart Broad	2011	2014	27	11	15	0	1	42.31
6	Graeme Swann	2011	2011	3	2	1	0	0	66.66
7	Eoin Morgan	2012	2021	72	42	27	2	1	60.56
8	James Tredwell	2013	2013	1	0	0	0	1	–
9	Jos Buttler	2015	2025	51	26	22	0	3	54.16
10	Moeen Ali	2020	2023	12	5	7	0	0	41.66
11	Phil Salt	2024	2024	2	1	1	0	0	50.00
12	Harry Brook	2025	2026	27	21	3	0	3	87.50
13	Jacob Bethell	2025	2025	2	2	0	0	0	100.00
