= Jamie Smith (cricketer) =

English cricketer

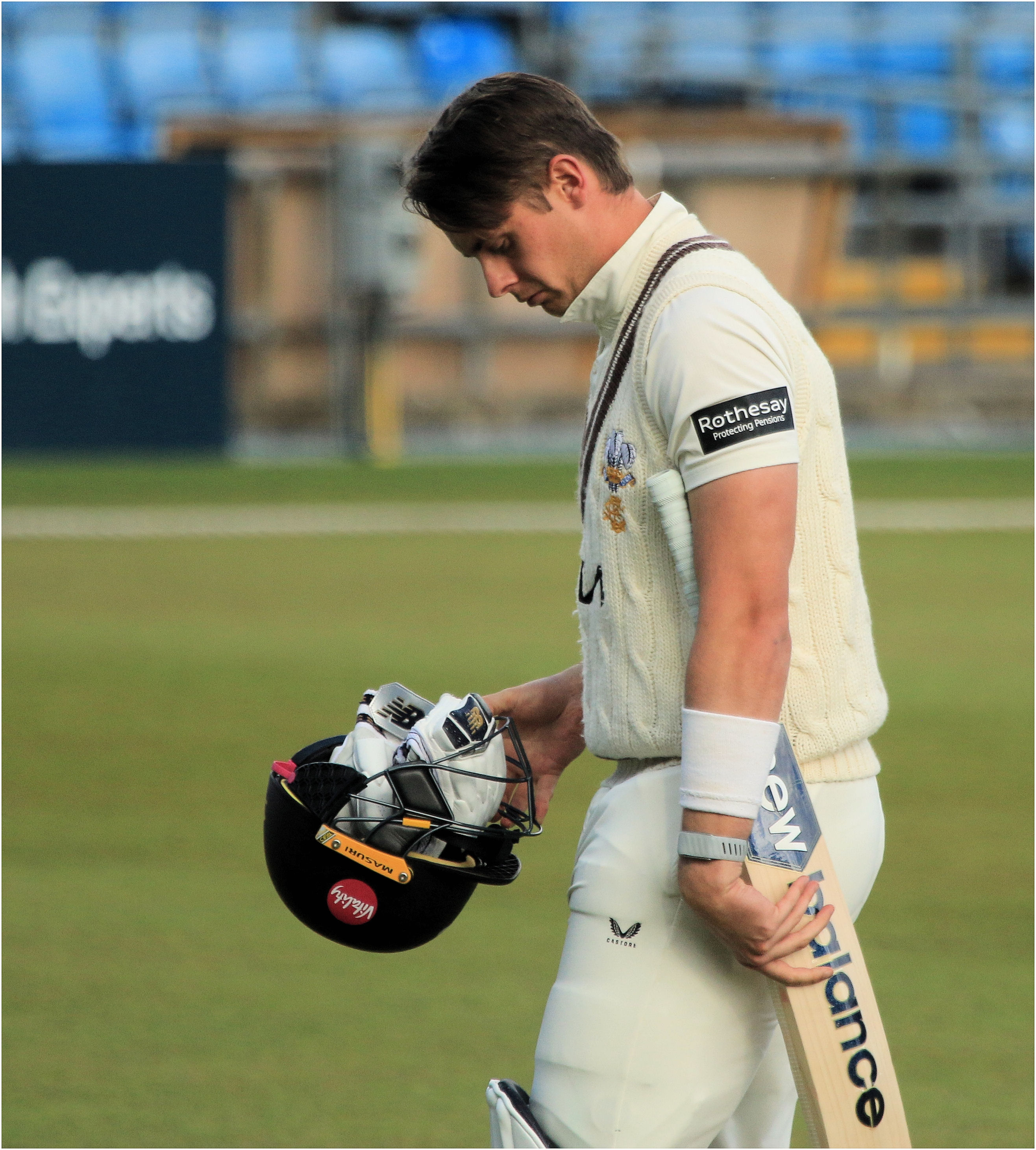
- Smith in 2026

Personal information
- Full name: Jamie Luke Smith
- Born: 12 July 2000 (age 26); Epsom, Surrey, England
- Height: 6 ft 2 in (1.88 m)
- Batting: Right-handed
- Role: Wicket-keeper-batter

International information
- National side: England (2023–present)
- Test debut (cap 715): 10 July 2024 v West Indies
- Last Test: 9 September 2026 v Pakistan
- ODI debut (cap 274): 23 September 2023 v Ireland
- Last ODI: 1 November 2025 v New Zealand
- ODI shirt no.: 39
- T20I debut (cap 107): 25 January 2025 v India
- Last T20I: 10 June 2025 v West Indies

Domestic team information
- Years: Team
- 2018–present: Surrey (squad no. 11)
- 2023–2024: Birmingham Phoenix (squad no. 11)
- 2024: Gulf Giants
- 2025: London Spirit
- 2026: Southern Brave

Career statistics
Competition	Test	ODI	T20I	FC
Matches	25	19	5	93
Runs scored	1,549	392	130	5,683
Batting average	39.71	21.77	26.00	42.09
100s/50s	2/10	0/3	0/1	14/27
Top score	184*	64	60	234*
Catches/stumpings	77/2	9/0	1/0	159/6
- Source: Cricinfo, 12 September 2026

Jamie Luke Smith (born 12 July 2000) is an English international cricketer who plays for England in all three formats of the game as a wicket-keeper-batter. He plays domestically for Surrey.

== Early life ==
Smith's parents, Lawrence and Bernadette, are not 'cricket nuts' but signed him up for a summer course at Sutton Cricket Club, aged six or seven, after Smith was inspired by the 2005 Ashes series. By the age of nine, whilst still at primary school in Ewell, he was part of Surrey's development system. He represented a Surrey age group side at the age of 10.

Like several of the county's players, he attended Whitgift School on a cricket scholarship, and was scoring hundreds by the age of 12, as well as keeping wicket. He was also a talented footballer, and played for AFC Wimbledon until the age of 15. Steve James noted in the Times that, having been quite slight when younger and made a deliberate effort to improve his strength, the size of Smith's arms was one reason why he could hit a cricket ball so far. Writing after Smith made his first Test century, he also commented on the cricketer's "understated yet high-achieving mentality". Jamie Smith is a lifelong supporter of West Ham United. He grew up supporting the club, influenced by his mum from East London, and has visited the club's ground.

== County career ==
He made his Twenty20 debut for Surrey on 5 July 2018, aged 17, against Middlesex at Lord's in the T20 Blast, and his first-class debut for Surrey against the Marylebone Cricket Club in Dubai on 24 March 2019. Scoring 127 runs in the first innings of this match, he became the ninth Surrey batsman to make a century on first-class debut, and broke the county's record for the highest total by a first-class debutant, which had stood since 1899. He made his List A debut on 25 April 2019 for Surrey against Middlesex at the Oval in the One-Day Cup.

In April 2022, Smith scored his maiden first-class double century, reaching 234 not out against Gloucestershire in the County Championship. He was part of the Surrey team that won the title in 2022 and 2023.

In March 2023, he was bought by the Birmingham Phoenix for the 2023 season of the Hundred. On 21 August 2023, Smith signed a new multi-year contract with Surrey.

== International career ==
In January 2023, Smith was included in the England Lions squad for their tour of Sri Lanka. On 8–9 February, in an unofficial Test match against Sri Lanka A in Galle, he scored the fastest ever century for the Lions. In reaching his hundred off 71 balls, he broke the previous record, set by Luke Wright against New Zealand A in March 2009, by 20 deliveries. Smith later said that the approach of England coach Brendon McCullum and captain Ben Stokes to Test cricket (so-called "Bazball") had altered his perspective on batting, such that whereas previously he had been "pretty tentative at the crease", during the tour "the way [he] looked to play was a lot more dominant, looking at positive options".

In September 2023, Smith received his first full England cap when called up for the ODI series against Ireland. The selectors had been looking for an opportunity to introduce him to Test cricket for some time when, the following summer, he was selected ahead of Ben Foakes and Jonny Bairstow as wicket-keeper for the home Test series against the West Indies. He made his Test debut at Lord's on 10 July 2024 and scored 70 in his first innings, when Scyld Berry said that he had "batted like an old master, not a debutant". Smith said after the series that his entry into Test cricket left him more drained than he had expected, and took nine days off before playing his first match of the season in the Hundred for Birmingham Phoenix. Hitting 111 from 148 deliveries, he scored his maiden Test century on 23 August 2024, in the first innings of first Test against Sri Lanka at Old Trafford, Manchester. With this, Smith became only the third England player (after Harry Brook and Bryan Valentine) to score more than 70 in three of their first five Test innings. The 318 runs he amassed during these five innings was also the second highest of any wicketkeeper in Test history, and the sixth highest of any England player. The 169 runs he added to this figure by the end of the summer yielded the third highest return by an England wicketkeeper during a home Test season. Having "cemented his place" as the Test side's first choice behind the stumps, Smith was selected for the subsequent three-match away series against Pakistan. Just prior to the tour, he was named the Men's Young Player of the Year by the Professional Cricketers' Association, and also offered a central contract with England until the end of 2026.

He has been described by BBC Test Match Special commentator Daniel Norcross as a "generational talent". He holds the record for highest Test score by an England wicket-keeper, 184 not out against India in the second Test match of the 2025 Anderson–Tendulkar Trophy.

== Awards ==
Smith was named as one of the 2025 Wisden Cricketers of the Year.
