= John Turner (cricketer, born 2001) =

South African cricketer (born 2001)

Personal information
- Full name: John Andrew Turner
- Born: 10 April 2001 (age 25); Johannesburg, Gauteng, South Africa
- Height: 6 ft 1 in (185 cm)
- Batting: Right-handed
- Bowling: Right-arm fast-medium
- Role: Bowler

International information
- National side: England (2024)
- ODI debut (cap 279): 31 October 2024 v West Indies
- Last ODI: 2 November 2024 v West Indies
- T20I debut (cap 106): 16 November 2024 v West Indies
- Last T20I: 17 November 2024 v West Indies

Domestic team information
- Years: Team
- 2021–2026: Hampshire (squad no. 6)
- 2023–2025: Trent Rockets
- 2024: Paarl Royals
- 2025: → Lancashire (loan)

Career statistics
Competition	ODI	T20I	FC	T20
Matches	2	2	10	35
Runs scored	2	–	27	12
Batting average	–	–	2.45	6.00
100s/50s	0/0	–/–	0/0	0/0
Top score	2*	–	7	4
Balls bowled	66	36	1,111	643
Wickets	2	1	25	48
Bowling average	34.00	64.00	25.36	18.85
5 wickets in innings	0	0	1	0
10 wickets in match	0	0	0	0
Best bowling	2/42	1/42	5/31	4/23
Catches/stumpings	0/–	0/–	0/–	5/–
- Source: Cricinfo, 6 August 2026

John Andrew Turner (born 10 April 2001) is a former South African-born English cricketer.

== Early life and education ==
Turner was born in Johannesburg, South Africa. Turner holds a British passport through his mother, who was born in Zambia to English parents. Her father was employed by the British Government during that period. He attended Hilton College, where he was head boy in 2019, and former Hampshire coach Dale Benkenstein was head coach.

== Career ==
In April 2020, Turner was part of Gauteng's Academy intake. The following month, he was due to play in the Southern Premier Cricket League in England, but he did not travel due to the COVID-19 pandemic. He made his List A debut on 22 July 2021, for Hampshire in the 2021 Royal London One-Day Cup in England. His first professional dismissal was the wicket of Alastair Cook. He made his first-class debut on 13 May 2022, for Hampshire against the Sri Lanka Cricket Development XI side during their tour of England, taking 5/31 in the first innings. In July 2023, he was drafted into The Hundred by the Trent Rockets.

In August 2023, just 70 days after making his T20 debut, he was called up to the England squad to face New Zealand, but ultimately had to pull out before the series due to injury. In October 2023, he was called up to the England Lions cricket team. Turner was included in the England Lions squad to tour Australia in January 2025.

Turner announced his retirement due to persistent injuries in August 2026.
