= Gus Atkinson =

English cricketer (born 1998)

Personal information
- Full name: Angus Alexander Patrick Atkinson
- Born: 19 January 1998 (age 28); Chelsea, London, England
- Height: 6 ft 2 in (188 cm)
- Batting: Right-handed
- Bowling: Right-arm fast-medium
- Role: Bowler
- Relatives: Henry Norris (great-great-grandfather)

International information
- National side: England (2023–present)
- Test debut (cap 714): 10 July 2024 v West Indies
- Last Test: 9 September 2026 v Pakistan
- ODI debut (cap 270): 8 September 2023 v New Zealand
- Last ODI: 18 November 2026 v Australia
- ODI shirt no.: 37
- T20I debut (cap 101): 1 September 2023 v New Zealand
- Last T20I: 22 January 2025 v India

Domestic team information
- Years: Team
- 2020–present: Surrey (squad no. 37)
- 2021: Southern Brave
- 2022–2025: Oval Invincibles
- 2026: Manchester Super Giants

Career statistics
Competition	Test	ODI	T20I	FC
Matches	21	23	4	47
Runs scored	587	252	10	1,130
Batting average	19.56	25.20	10.00	19.48
100s/50s	1/0	0/0	0/0	1/3
Top score	118	38	8*	118
Balls bowled	3,457	1,066	65	7,635
Wickets	83	31	6	163
Bowling average	25.34	33.41	20.33	26.86
5 wickets in innings	5	0	0	6
10 wickets in match	1	0	0	1
Best bowling	7/45	4/28	4/20	7/45
Catches/stumpings	9/–	5/–	1/–	14/–
- Source: Cricinfo, 18 November 2026

Angus Alexander Patrick Atkinson (born 19 January 1998) is an English professional cricketer who plays for Surrey and England. He is a right-arm fast bowler and batsman.

== Early life and education ==
Atkinson was educated at Northcote Lodge, a preparatory school in Wandsworth, London, and Bradfield College, an independent school in Berkshire, England. He has an older sister and younger brother. His mother, Caroline, died at the age of 55 in December 2020 as a result of injuries sustained in a car accident, for which the driver of the other vehicle involved was found responsible and given a prison sentence in 2024.

== Domestic career ==
He made his first-class debut on 8 August 2020, for Surrey in the 2020 Bob Willis Trophy. He made his Twenty20 debut on 28 August 2020, for Surrey in the 2020 t20 Blast. He made his List A debut on 22 July 2021, for Surrey in the 2021 Royal London One-Day Cup.

In April 2022, he was bought by the Oval Invincibles for the 2022 season of The Hundred. Atkinson was part of the Surrey team that won the 2022 County Championship. He was retained by the Oval Invincibles for the 2023 season of The Hundred.

On 18 September 2023, Atkinson signed a new multi-year contract extension at Surrey. In February 2024, it was announced that he had withdrawn from his £95,000 IPL contract with Kolkata Knight Riders after discussion with the England and Wales Cricket Board, who were keen to manage his workload.

== International career ==
Atkinson received his first senior England call-up on 16 August 2023 for the ODI and T20I series against New Zealand. He made his T20I debut on 1 September 2023 against New Zealand in the second T20I of the four match series. During that match, he took figures of 4/20, which were the best by an England men's bowler on T20I debut.

In September 2023, Atkinson was named in the England squad for the 2023 Cricket World Cup in India.

In December 2023, Atkinson received his first call-up to the England Test squad for their tour of India. On 30 June 2024, Atkinson was named in the Test squad for the West Indies tour. He made his debut in the first Test at Lord's on 10 July 2024, taking seven wickets in the first innings and five in the second. His match figures of 12/106 were the best by an England debutant in 134 years as he made it onto the Lord's honours boards.

He scored his maiden first-class century in the first innings of the second Test against Sri Lanka at Lord's on 30 August 2024, reaching his hundred off 103 balls. In doing so, he became only the sixth player to have taken five wickets in an innings, ten wickets in a match, and scored a century at the ground. In terms of deliveries faced, the latter was also the sixth fastest there in Test history. He went on to take five wickets in Sri Lanka's second innings, becoming only the third England player (the first since Ian Botham in 1984) to achieve this and score a hundred in the same Test match.

In December 2024, Atkinson bowled a hat-trick in a Test against New Zealand, becoming the first Englishman in all Tests since 2017 to do so. Atkinson suffered a hamstring strain in the first Test of the 2025 English summer against Zimbabwe. He returned to the England team for the final Test of the India series and took a fourth five-wicket haul.

== Awards ==
Atkinson was named England player of the year at the 2024 Cricket Writers' Club Awards. He was named as one of the 2025 Wisden Cricketers of the Year.
