= Harry Brook =

English cricketer (born 1999)

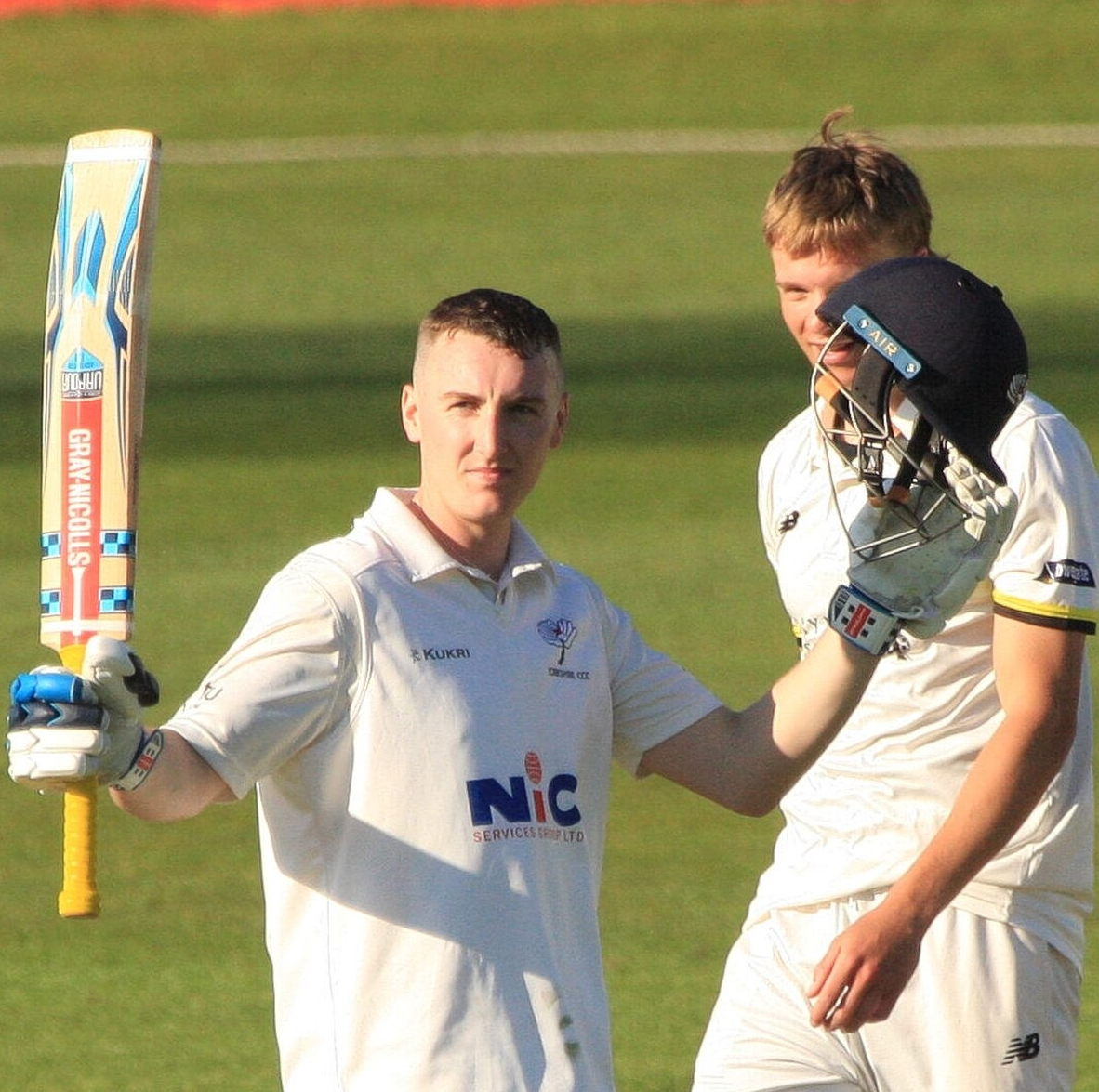
- Brook batting for Yorkshire in 2022

Personal information
- Full name: Harry Cherrington Brook
- Born: 22 February 1999 (age 27); Keighley, West Yorkshire, England
- Height: 183 cm (6 ft 0 in)
- Batting: Right-handed
- Bowling: Right-arm medium
- Role: Middle-order batter

International information
- National side: England (2022–present)
- Test debut (cap 707): 8 September 2022 v South Africa
- Last Test: 9 September 2026 v Pakistan
- ODI debut (cap 267): 27 January 2023 v South Africa
- Last ODI: 18 November 2026 v Australia
- ODI shirt no.: 88
- T20I debut (cap 92): 26 January 2022 v West Indies
- Last T20I: 19 September 2026 v Sri Lanka
- T20I shirt no.: 88

Domestic team information
- Years: Team
- 2016–present: Yorkshire
- 2021–present: Sunrisers Leeds
- 2021/22: Hobart Hurricanes
- 2022: Lahore Qalandars
- 2023: Sunrisers Hyderabad

Career statistics
Competition	Test	ODI	T20I	FC
Matches	41	51	71	105
Runs scored	3,610	1,805	1,702	7,191
Batting average	53.08	38.40	36.21	44.11
100s/50s	10/20	4/8	2/8	19/39
Top score	317	202	114*	317
Balls bowled	180	5	–	1,364
Wickets	1	1	–	12
Bowling average	127.00	7.00	–	55.83
5 wickets in innings	0	0	–	0
10 wickets in match	0	0	–	0
Best bowling	1/25	1/7	–	3/11
Catches/stumpings	66/–	27/–	41/–	120/–
Medal record
Men's Cricket
Representing England
ICC T20 World Cup
Winner	2022 Australia
- Source: ESPNcricinfo, 18 November 2026

Harry Cherrington Brook (born 22 February 1999) is an English international cricketer who plays for England in all three formats of the game and is the Test vice-captain, ODI and T20I captain. Brook plays domestic cricket for Yorkshire. Primarily a right-handed batsman, he also bowls right-arm medium pace. He made his international debut for England in January 2022. He is the first player from England to score a double century in ODIs and the fastest to do so internationally.

He made a prolific start to his test career by amassing 809 runs in his first six test appearances having batted ten times with a career average of 80.90 and with a strike rate of almost 100. Brook was part of the England cricket team that won the 2022 T20 World Cup. In December 2024, he topped the ICC rankings for Test batsmen during England's tour of New Zealand.

Harry Brook was named as ICC Men's Player of the Month award twice in December 2022 and February 2023.

== Early life ==
Brook was born in Keighley to parents David and Lucy Brook (née Cherrington) but raised in Burley in Wharfedale. His family were active in club cricket.

He was educated at Ilkley Grammar School, a comprehensive school in Ilkley, West Yorkshire. At the age of 14, he moved to Sedbergh School, a private boarding school in Cumbria. Journalist Alex Mason reported for the Cricketer Magazine that former professional cricketer and Sedbergh School cricket coach Martin Speight was a very big influence on Brook's career during his schooldays.

Brook has supported several charitable endeavours, including recording a video message for Team Hope while they were fundraising for the British Heart Foundation.

== Cricket career ==
=== Domestic ===
Brook made his first-class debut for Yorkshire against Pakistan A on 26 June 2016 at Headingley whilst still at school. He made his County Championship debut for Yorkshire against Middlesex at Lord's on 19 June 2017. His debut followed a series of three centuries scored within a fortnight for Yorkshire's second eleven. At international level, Brook toured India in early 2017 with the England under-19s, playing in two U-19 Tests and five U-19 LOIs against the India under-19s.

Brook made his Twenty20 debut for Yorkshire in the 2018 t20 Blast on 5 July 2018. He was signed by Northern Superchargers for The Hundred 2021 tournament.

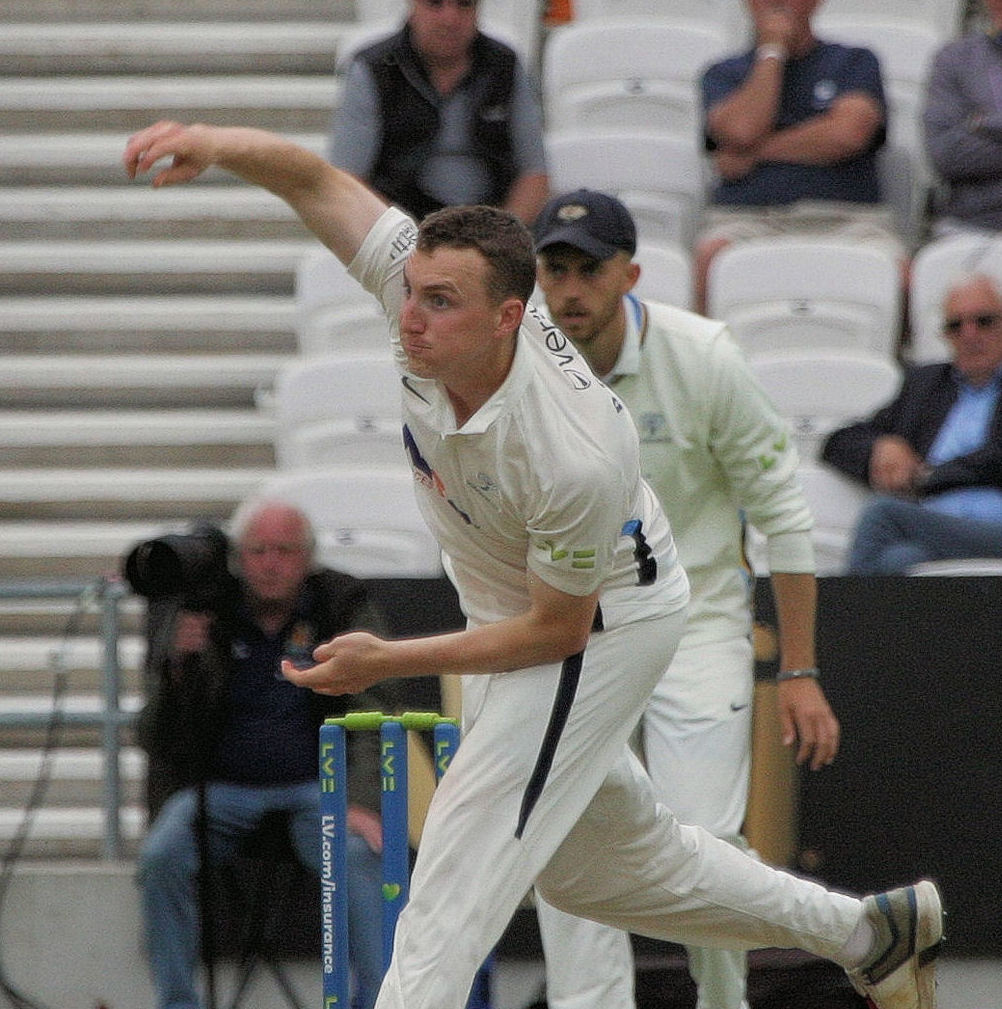
Brook bowling for Yorkshire in 2021

In 2022, Brook was signed by Lahore Qalandars. In a match against Islamabad United, Brook came to bat when Lahore were 12–3 and scored an unbeaten 102 off 49 balls as his team made a 197 total. It was his maiden T20 century, becoming the youngest ever centurion in the Pakistan Super League.

In April 2022, Brook was bought by the Northern Superchargers for the 2022 season of The Hundred.

In South Africa's new SA20 competition, Brook will play for the Johannesburg Super Kings (JSK), who paid R2.3 million for his services.

In December 2022, Brook was bought for the first time by Sunrisers Hyderabad for ₹ 13.25 crore (about £1,300,000 at 2023 exchange rates), to play for them in the 2023 Indian Premier League. On 14 April 2023, he scored his maiden century in IPL, against Kolkata Knight Riders. He also became the first player to score a century in both the IPL and the PSL. He was released by Sunrisers Hyderabad in November 2023 after just one season.

Harry entered a partnership with Major League Baseball in early 2023, becoming an ambassador for MLB Europe. He is featured in various cricket/baseball crossover social media content and plays with an MLB logo at the end of his cricket bat.

He was named the Professional Cricketers Association's Player of the Year in 2023.

He was picked up by Delhi Capitals in the 2024 IPL Mini Auction which was held in December 2023 in Dubai.

=== International ===
Brook captained the England under-19 cricket team in a five match youth ODI series against India in August 2017.

In December 2017, Brook was named as the captain of England's squad for the 2018 Under-19 Cricket World Cup. In England's second group fixture, against Bangladesh, he scored 102 not out, becoming the second England captain after Alastair Cook to score a century in the U19 World Cup. Following England's matches in the tournament, the International Cricket Council (ICC) named Brook as the rising star of the squad. He was the leading run-scorer for England in the tournament, with 239 runs.

In January 2022, Brook was named in the England's T20I squad for the series against West Indies. He made his T20I debut on 26 January 2022, for England against the West Indies. In May 2022, Brook was named in England's Test squad for their home series against New Zealand. In July 2022, Brook was named in England's One Day International (ODI) squad for their home series against India. In August 2022, he was named in England's Test squad for their series against South Africa. He made his Test debut on 8 September 2022, for England against South Africa. In September 2022, Brook was named in England's squad for the 2022 Men's T20 world cup who then went on to win the tournament.

He was included in the Test and T20I squads of the English cricket team in Pakistan in 2022–23. During the first Test in Rawalpindi, he top scored in both innings, notching up his first Test century of 153 runs in the first innings and 87 in the second, helping to set up England for their win on the final day. He made his ODI debut on 27 January 2023, for England against South Africa.

In February 2023, during the second and final test match against New Zealand at Basin Reserve, he became the first batter to reach 800 test runs in just nine innings and his tally of 800 runs came after facing just 803 deliveries in his test career. In test matches, only Sunil Gavaskar (912 runs) and Sir Donald Bradman (862 runs) made more runs in their first six appearances.

He registered a score of 186 which came off just 174 deliveries including 24 fours and 5 sixes during the test match with a strike rate of 105.68 where he, alongside Joe Root, rescued England by lifting England from a precarious position of 21/3 to a total of 435/8 before the declaration. He and Root added 302 crucial runs for the fourth wicket before the former was undone by Matt Henry. Following his dismissal, he made history by being the leading run-scorer in test cricket after their first nine test innings with a tally of 809 runs surpassing the previous record held by Vinod Kambli of India who had made 792 runs in 9 innings. His partnership with Root also broke the record for the highest ever partnership by an English pair against New Zealand in New Zealand for any wicket. The previous record was held by Andrew Flintoff and Graham Thorpe who had combined for a 282 run partnership. Brook completed his fourth Test century in just six Test appearances and his career average rose to above 100.

In the third Test of the 2023 Ashes, Brook scored 75 to help England win the Test match. In this innings he became the fastest (by balls faced) to 1000 runs.

In 2024, Brook was selected for England's tour of India, but – whilst training in Dubai – requested to leave the party for personal reasons. In May 2024, he was named in England's squad for the 2024 ICC Men's T20 World Cup tournament.

In September 2024, he was named as stand-in captain of England's ODI team in the absence of Jos Buttler for the ODI series with Australia. In the third ODI, he scored his maiden ODI century scoring 110 not out from 94 deliveries. He then followed it with 87 runs off 58 balls in the fourth ODI and a 52-ball 72 in the final ODI. Although England lost the five-match series 3–2, Brook top-scored in the series with 312 runs.

In the first Test of the 2024 England tour of Pakistan, Brook hit his highest first-class (and therefore Test) score of 317 equaling the score Chris Gayle of the West Indies made against South Africa in 2005. It was the first Test triple century by an Englishman in 34 years, and the sixth overall after Andy Sandham's 325 not out in 1930, Wally Hammond's 336 not out in 1933, Len Hutton's 364 in 1938, John Edrich's 310 not out in 1965, and Graham Gooch's 333 in 1990. He also became the third man to score a triple century against Pakistan after Sir Garfield Sobers' 365 not out in 1958, and David Warner's 335 not out in 2019. During this innings, he shared an England record partnership of 454 with Joe Root. This was also a record for any fourth-wicket partnership in Tests.

On 7 April 2025, Harry Brook was named Captain of the English Cricket Team in ODI and T20I formats. He got a comfortable start to his captaincy by whitewashing West Indies 3–0 in the ODI and T20 series. In the First match of India and England test series, he scored 99 and got out on a duck in the second innings. In the first innings of the second test, he scored 158 and was involved in a 303 run partnership for 6th wicket with Jamie Smith. In the fifth and last match of the series he scored 53 in the second innings and went on to score 111 runs from 98 balls in the 4th innings of the test while chasing 374. In September 2025, it was announced that Brook would become England test match vice-captain for the 2025-26 Ashes series after Ollie Pope was stripped of the role.

On 24 February 2026, Brook hit his first T20I century against Pakistan in a Super 8 fixture during the T20 World Cup. He scored 100 runs off 51 balls, hitting 10 fours and 4 sixes, as England chased a tricky target of 165 primarily due to his knock. He won Player of the Match for his match-winning innings. He became the first captain in the tournament's history to score a century, and the third England batter to record a T20 World Cup century, following Alex Hales and Jos Buttler and the third England player after Buttler and Dawid Malan to score a least one century in all three international formats (Tests, ODIs and T20Is) for England.

On 11 July during the 5th T20I against India, Brook hit 95 runs off 45 balls, featuring 4 fours and 8 sixes, as he and Jos Buttler, who hit 131 runs of 64 balls, forged a mammoth 233 run stand in just 103 balls, making it the 2nd largest T20I partnership ever among full member nations and 4th largest overall.

On 15 September 2026 During the 1st T20I against Sri Lanka, Brook hit his 2nd T20I century, off 42 balls. He eventually scored an unbeaten 114* off 49 balls, hitting 10 fours and 6 sixes.

On 22nd October, 2026, during the 3rd Match of the 2026–27 Pakistan ODI Tri-Series, Brook hit 202 runs off 116 deliveries, making it the first double century by an English batter in ODI's. This is also the fastest double century in Men's ODI history, off 114 balls. He also became the second batter after Chris Gayle to have scored a triple century in tests, a double century in ODI's, and a century in T20I's.

== International centuries ==
List of Test centuries scored by Harry Brook
No.	Score	Opponent	Venue	Date	Result	Ref
1	153	Pakistan	Rawalpindi Cricket Stadium, Rawalpindi	1 December 2022	Won	
2	108	Pakistan	Multan Cricket Stadium, Multan	9 December 2022	Won	
3	111	Pakistan	National Stadium, Karachi	17 December 2022	Won	
4	186	New Zealand	Basin Reserve, Wellington	24 February 2023	Lost	
5	109	West Indies	Trent Bridge, Nottingham	18 July 2024	Won	
6	317	Pakistan	Multan Cricket Stadium, Multan	10 October 2024	Won	
7	171	New Zealand	Hagley Oval, Christchurch	28 November 2024	Won	
8	123	New Zealand	Basin Reserve, Wellington	6 December 2024	Won	
9	158	India	Edgbaston Cricket Ground, Birmingham	2 July 2025	Lost	
10	111	India	The Oval, London	31 July 2025	Lost	

=== One Day International centuries ===
No.	Runs	Balls	Opponent	Venue	Date	Result
1	110*	94	Australia	Riverside Ground, Chester-le-Street	24 September 2024	Won
2	135	101	New Zealand	Bay Oval, Mount Maunganui	26 October 2025	Lost
3	136*	66	Sri Lanka	R. Premadasa Stadium, Colombo	27 January 2026	Won
4	202	116	Sri Lanka	Rawalpindi Cricket Stadium, Rawalpindi	22 October 2026	Lost

=== Twenty20 International centuries ===
No.	Runs	Balls	Opponent	Venue	Date	Result
1	100	51	Pakistan	Pallekele International Cricket Stadium, Pallekele	24 February 2026	Won
2	114*	49	Sri Lanka	The Ageas Bowl, West End, Southampton	15 September 2026	Won
