= Olly Stone =

English cricketer (born 1993)

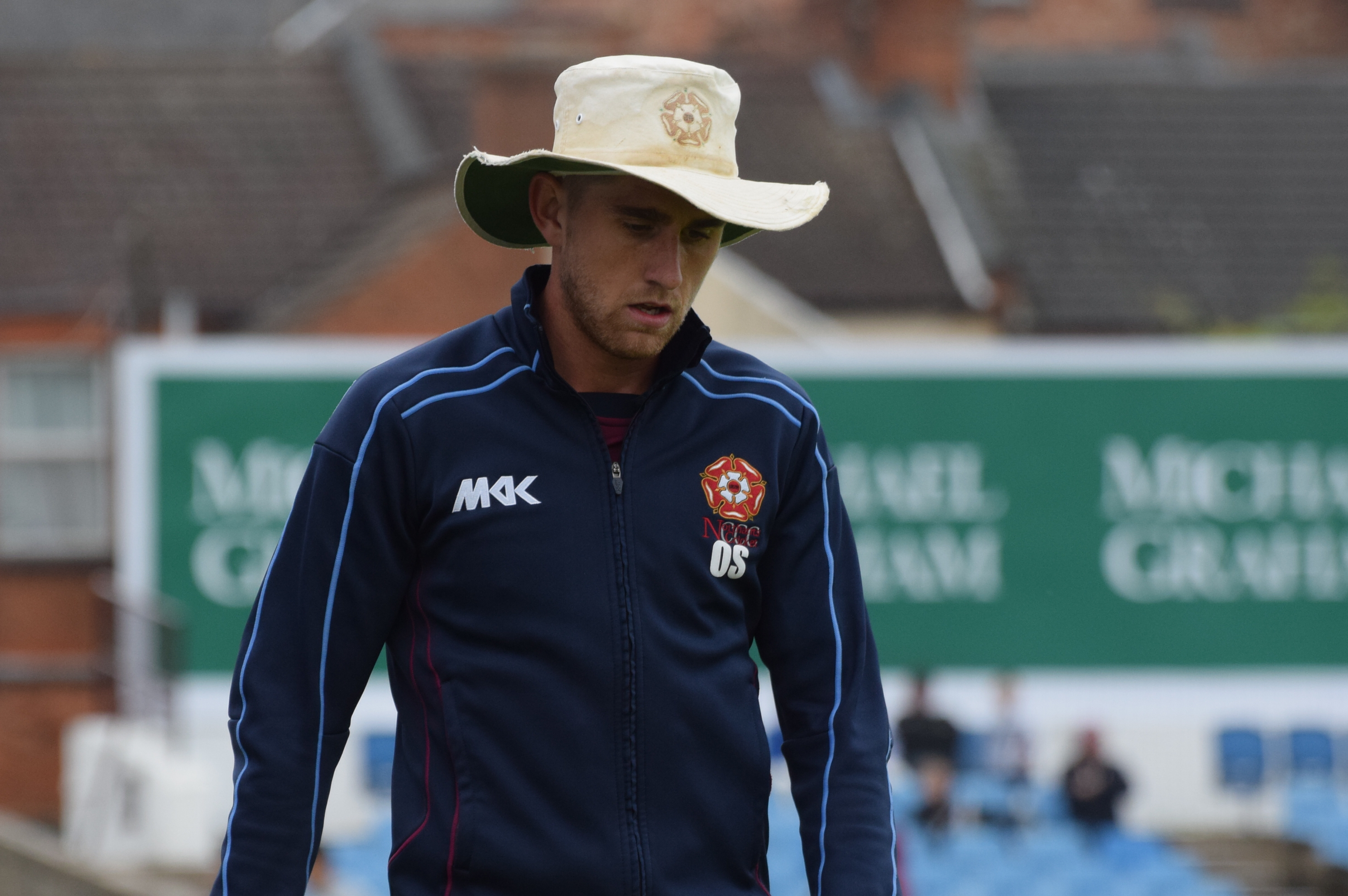

Personal information
- Full name: Oliver Peter Stone
- Born: 9 October 1993 (age 33); Norwich, Norfolk, England
- Height: 6 ft 3 in (1.91 m)
- Batting: Right-handed
- Bowling: Right-arm fast
- Role: Bowler

International information
- National side: England (2018–2024)
- Test debut (cap 692): 24 July 2019 v Ireland
- Last Test: 6 September 2024 v Sri Lanka
- ODI debut (cap 251): 10 October 2018 v Sri Lanka
- Last ODI: 29 September 2024 v Australia
- Only T20I (cap 98): 25 September 2022 v Pakistan

Domestic team information
- Years: Team
- 2011–2012: Norfolk
- 2011–2016: Northamptonshire (squad no. 9)
- 2017–2022: Warwickshire (squad no. 6)
- 2022/23–2023/24: MI Cape Town
- 2023–present: Nottinghamshire (squad no. 9)
- 2023–2025: London Spirit
- 2023/24: Melbourne Stars
- 2024: Multan Sultans
- 2025: → Middlesex (loan)
- 2026: MI London

Career statistics
Competition	Test	ODI	FC	LA
Matches	5	10	66	39
Runs scored	102	24	1,233	143
Batting average	11.33	8.00	17.12	14.30
100s/50s	0/0	0/0	0/4	0/0
Top score	20	9*	90	24*
Balls bowled	610	394	10,284	1,597
Wickets	17	9	225	38
Bowling average	23.52	44.33	25.79	39.55
5 wickets in innings	0	0	11	0
10 wickets in match	0	0	2	0
Best bowling	3/29	4/85	8/80	4/71
Catches/stumpings	2/–	2/–	25/–	15/–
- Source: ESPNcricinfo, 26 September 2026

Oliver Peter Stone (born 9 October 1993) is an English cricketer who currently plays for Nottinghamshire and England. Stone is a right-arm fast bowler and right-handed batsman. He was born in Norwich, Norfolk and was educated at Thorpe St Andrew School. He made his international debut for England in October 2018. Known as one of the fastest bowlers in England, Stone has recorded speeds up to 94 mph (151 km/h)

== Domestic career ==
Stone made his debut in county cricket for his native Norfolk County Cricket Club against Bedfordshire in the 2011 Minor Counties Championship.

Having been a part of the Northamptonshire Cricket Academy since 2009, and played Second XI cricket for the county since 2010, Stone made his first team debut for Northamptonshire in a Twenty20 match against Durham in the Friends Provident t20. He was dismissed in the match for a first-ball duck by Paul Collingwood, the third victim of Collingwood's hat-trick. In 2012, Stone made his List A debut for the county against Warwickshire in the Clydesdale Bank 40, and his first-class debut against Yorkshire in the County Championship. Stone would regularly play for Northants through the 2012 season and consequently signed a new 2-year deal with the county in July 2012.

Earlier in the season he appeared for Norfolk in two MCCA Knockout Trophy matches against Shropshire and Wiltshire.

Early in the 2016 season he suffered a serious knee injury while celebrating the wicket of Moeen Ali, which caused him to miss the rest of the season. Nonetheless, in July he signed a three-year contract to play for Warwickshire.

In April 2022, he was bought by the Birmingham Phoenix for the 2022 season of The Hundred.

In July 2022, Stone agreed to join Nottinghamshire on a three-year deal commencing at the end of 2022 season. He signed a two-year contract extension in August 2026, tying him into the club until at least the end of the 2028 season. Stone took 50 wickets in the 2026 County Championship, the first time he had achieved the feat in his career.

== International career ==
Stone, alongside fellow Northants youngster Ben Duckett, was called up to the England Under-19 squad for their tour to South Africa in 2013 on the back of his performances for Northants in the second half of the 2012 season. During the tour he registered England Under-19's best ever bowling figures in youth Tests to date, taking 11–79.

In September 2018, he was named in England's Test and One Day International (ODI) squads for the series against Sri Lanka. He made his ODI debut for England against Sri Lanka on 10 October 2018, though the game was washed out after 15 overs before he had a chance to bat or bowl. In December 2018, Stone was named in England's Test squad for the series against the West Indies. However, ahead of the first Test, he was ruled out of the tour with a back injury. His county side, Warwickshire, later confirmed he had a stress fracture in his lower back, which would take six to twelve weeks to heal.

In July 2019, Stone was named in England's Test squad, for their one-off match against Ireland at Lord's. He made his Test debut for England, against Ireland, at Lord's on 24 July 2019.

On 29 May 2020, Stone was named in a 55-man group of players to begin training ahead of international fixtures starting in England following the COVID-19 pandemic. On 17 June 2020, Stone was included in England's 30-man squad to start training behind closed doors for the Test series against the West Indies. On 4 July 2020, Stone was named as one of the nine reserve players for the first Test match of the series.

In 2021, Stone was part of the England Men's Test Squad for their tour of Sri Lanka and India. He was named in a 12-man squad for the second Test in India and was confirmed in the side at the toss ahead of Chris Woakes. Stone took the first wicket of this Test, getting Shubman Gill out lbw with his third delivery.

In September 2022, he was named in the England's T20I squad for the series against Pakistan. He made his T20I debut on 25 September 2022, against Pakistan.
