= Matthew Potts =

English Cricketer

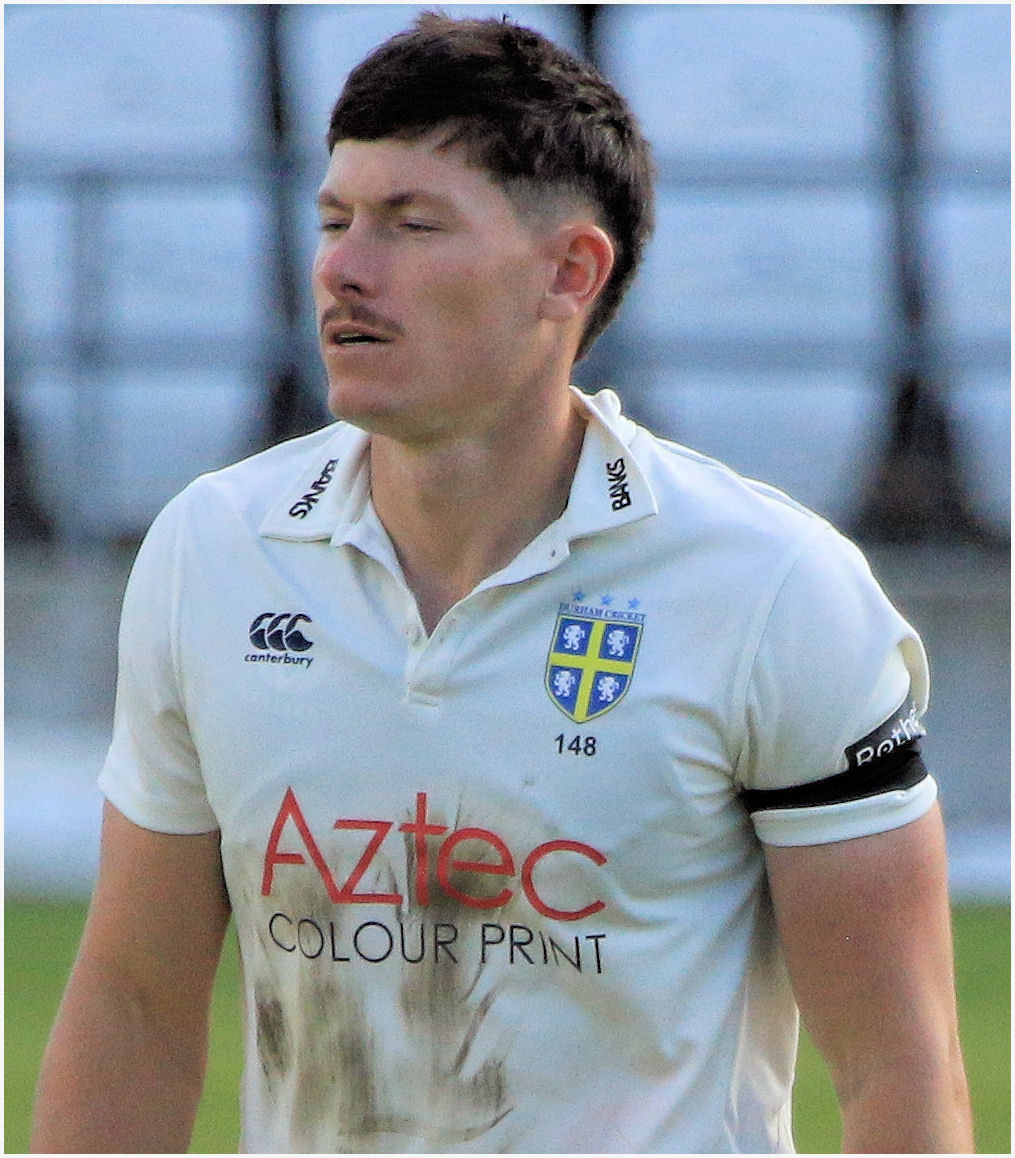
- Potts in 2025

Personal information
- Full name: Matthew James Potts
- Born: 29 October 1998 (age 28); Sunderland, Tyne and Wear, England
- Height: 6 ft 2 in (188 cm)
- Batting: Right-handed
- Bowling: Right-arm fast-medium
- Role: Bowler

International information
- National side: England (2022–present)
- Test debut (cap 704): 2 June 2022 v New Zealand
- Last Test: 4 January 2026 v Australia
- ODI debut (cap 265): 19 July 2022 v South Africa
- Last ODI: 3 June 2025 v West Indies
- ODI shirt no.: 35
- Only T20I (cap 108): 6 June 2025 v West Indies
- T20I shirt no.: 35

Domestic team information
- Years: Team
- 2017–present: Durham (squad no. 35)
- 2021–present: Sunrisers Leeds (squad no. 35)
- 2025: MI Cape Town (squad no. 35)

Career statistics
Competition	Test	ODI	FC	LA
Matches	11	11	84	24
Runs scored	105	45	1,746	124
Batting average	10.50	45.00	20.54	17.71
100s/50s	0/0	0/0	1/5	0/0
Top score	21	15*	149*	30
Balls bowled	2,191	402	16,296	894
Wickets	36	12	337	29
Bowling average	33.36	33.33	24.87	29.34
5 wickets in innings	0	0	13	0
10 wickets in match	0	0	4	0
Best bowling	4/13	4/38	9/68	4/38
Catches/stumpings	9/–	4/–	36/–	9/–
- Source: ESPNcricinfo, 27 September 2026

Matthew James Potts (born 29 October 1998) is an English cricketer. Potts is a right-arm pace bowler and lower order batter. He plays first-class cricket for Durham and made his Test match debut for the England cricket team in June 2022.

== Domestic career ==
Potts made his first-class debut for Durham in the 2017 County Championship on 8 June 2017. He made his List A debut for Durham in the 2018 Royal London One-Day Cup on 18 May 2018. He made his T20 debut on 19 July 2019, for Durham against Northamptonshire, in the 2019 T20 Blast.

In April 2022, he was bought by the Northern Superchargers for the 2022 season of The Hundred. Later the same month, in the 2022 County Championship, Potts took his maiden five-wicket haul in first-class cricket, with 6/58 against Leicestershire. A month later, Potts took seven wickets in the second innings, and eleven wickets in the match, to help Durham to a 58 run win against Glamorgan.

== International career ==
In May 2022, Potts was named in England's Test squad for their home series against New Zealand, his maiden international call-up. Potts made his Test debut on 2 June 2022, for England against New Zealand. Potts took four wickets for just 13 runs in the first innings, and three wickets for 55 runs in the second innings, claiming total figures of 7 for 68 as England won the Test.

In July 2022, Potts was named in England's One Day International (ODI) squad for their home series against South Africa. He made his ODI debut on 19 July 2022, for England against South Africa.
