= Sri Lankan cricket team in England in 2026 =

International cricket tour

	England	Sri Lanka
- Dates: 15 – 27 September 2026
Captains	Harry Brook	Kusal Mendis (ODIs); Charith Asalanka (T20Is)

One Day International series
- Results: England won the 3-match series 2–1
Most runs	Tom Banton (209)	Kusal Mendis (198)
Most wickets	Will Jacks (6)	Asitha Fernando (7)
- Player of the series: Will Jacks (Eng)

Twenty20 International series
- Results: England won the 3-match series 3–0
Most runs	Jos Buttler (172)	Pathum Nissanka (85)
Most wickets	Sonny Baker (6); Liam Dawson (6)	Wanindu Hasaranga (2); Dushmantha Chameera (2); Eshan Malinga (2); Tharindu Rathnayake (2)
- Player of the series: Harry Brook (Eng)

The Sri Lanka cricket team toured England in September 2026 to play against the England cricket team. The tour consisted of three One Day International (ODI) and three Twenty20 International (T20I) matches. In July 2025, the England and Wales Cricket Board (ECB) confirmed the fixtures for the tour, as a part of the 2026 home international season.

== Squads ==
England		Sri Lanka	
ODIs	T20Is	ODIs	T20Is
Harry Brook (c); Rehan Ahmed; Jofra Archer; Gus Atkinson; Tom Banton; Sonny Baker; Jos Buttler (wk); Jordan Cox; Henry Crocombe; Liam Dawson; Ben Duckett; Will Jacks; Dan Lawrence; Jamie Overton; Adil Rashid; Joe Root; Josh Tongue	Harry Brook (c); Jofra Archer; Gus Atkinson; Tom Banton; Sonny Baker; Jos Buttler (wk); James Coles; Jordan Cox; Liam Dawson; Aneurin Donald; Ben Duckett; Will Jacks; Saqib Mahmood; Jamie Overton; Adil Rashid; Josh Tongue	Kusal Mendis (c, wk); Charith Asalanka (vc); Dushmantha Chameera; Sachindu Colombage; Asitha Fernando; Wanindu Hasaranga; Janith Liyanage; Dilshan Madushanka; Eshan Malinga; Kamindu Mendis; Kamil Mishara (wk); Pathum Nissanka; Pavan Rathnayake; Dasun Shanaka; Maheesh Theekshana; Dunith Wellalage	~~Kusal Mendis (c, wk)~~; Charith Asalanka (c); Dushmantha Chameera; ~~Binura Fernando~~; Wanindu Hasaranga; Janith Liyanage; Dilshan Madushanka; Eshan Malinga; Kamindu Mendis; Kamil Mishara (wk); Pathum Nissanka; Pavan Rathnayake; Tharindu Rathnayake; Dasun Shanaka; Maheesh Theekshana; Nuwan Thushara; Lahiru Udara (wk); Dunith Wellalage

On 4 September, Kusal Mendis and Binura Fernando were ruled out of the T20I series due to injuries and were replaced by Pavan Rathnayake and Dilshan Madushanka respectively. Charith Asalanka was appointed as the captain for the T20I series.

After the 2nd ODI, Dan Lawrence replaced injured Jos Buttler in the England squad.

== Tour matches ==
=== Twenty20 series : Sri Lanka vs England Lions ===
The Sri Lankan team played two Twenty20 matches against the England Lions team.

=== England Lions squad for T20 series ===
1. Tom Banton
2. Jafer Chohan
3. James Coles
4. Mason Crane
5. Henry Crocombe
6. Aneurin Donald
7. Caleb Falconer
8. Tom Hartley
9. Eddie Jack
10. Will Jacks
11. Saqib Mahmood
12. Ben Mayes
13. Ben McKinney
14. Joe Moores
15. Jamie Overton
16. Matt Revis
17. James Sales
18. Ollie Sykes
19. Paul Walter
20. Luke Wood

=== 1st T20 ===
11 September 2026
18:30 (N)
Scorecard

Sri Lanka; 117 (16.4 overs)	v	England Lions; 118/1 (7.2 overs)
Tharindu Rathnayake 48 (37); Luke Wood 4/27 (3.4 overs)		Tom Banton 56* (24); Dunith Wellalage 1/25 (2 overs)

England Lions won by 9 wickets
County Cricket Ground, Chelmsford
Umpires: Ian Blackwell (Eng) and Simon Widdup (Eng)

- England Lions won the toss and elected to field.

=== 2nd T20 ===
13 September 2026
14:30
Scorecard

Sri Lanka; 156/9 (20 overs)	v	England Lions; 76/1 (6.2 overs)
Kamil Mishara 31 (18); Mason Crane 2/20 (4 overs)		Paul Walter 34* (20); Maheesh Theekshana 1/19 (2 overs)

England Lions won by 9 wickets (DLS)
County Cricket Ground, Beckenham
Umpires: Ian Blackwell (Eng) and Simon Widdup (Eng)

- England Lions won the toss and elected to field.
- Pathum Nissanka (SL) scored his 5,000th run in T20s.
- England Lions were set a revised target of 73 runs in 8 overs due to rain.

== T20I series ==
=== 1st T20I ===
15 September 2026
18:30 (N)
Scorecard

England; 254/4 (20 overs)	v	Sri Lanka; 135 (19 overs)
Harry Brook 114* (49); Wanindu Hasaranga 1/34 (4 overs)		Dunith Wellalage 33 (21); Sonny Baker 3/12 (4 overs)

England won by 119 runs
Rose Bowl, Southampton
Umpires: Graham Lloyd (Eng) and James Middlebrook (Eng)
Player of the match: Harry Brook (Eng)

- Sri Lanka won the toss and elected to field.
- Aneurin Donald (Eng) made his T20I debut.

=== 2nd T20I ===
17 September 2026
18:30 (N)
Scorecard

Sri Lanka; 145/9 (20 overs)	v	England; 146/4 (12.1 overs)
Pathum Nissanka 37 (21); Liam Dawson 3/32 (4 overs)		Tom Banton 52* (24); Tharindu Rathnayake 1/25 (2 overs)

England won by 6 wickets
Sophia Gardens, Cardiff
Umpires: Russell Warren (Eng) and Robert White (Eng)
Player of the match: Liam Dawson (Eng)

- England won the toss and elected to field.
- Tharindu Rathnayake (SL) made his T20I debut.
- Wanindu Hasaranga (SL) played his 100th T20I match.

=== 3rd T20I ===
19 September 2026
14:30
Scorecard

Sri Lanka; 124 (18.5 overs)	v	England; 126/2 (9.4 overs)
Pathum Nissanka 36 (24); Sonny Baker 2/17 (3.5 overs)		Jos Buttler 62* (32); Tharindu Rathnayake 1/28 (2 overs)

England won by 8 wickets
Old Trafford, Manchester
Umpires: Russell Warren (Eng) and Graham Lloyd (Eng)
Player of the match: Sonny Baker (Eng)

- England won the toss and elected to field.

== ODI series ==
=== 1st ODI ===
22 September 2026
12:30 (D/N)
Scorecard

England; 265 (48.1 overs)	v	Sri Lanka; 176 (37 overs)
Harry Brook 67 (69); Sachindu Colombage 3/44 (10 overs)		Dunith Wellalage 45 (36); Will Jacks 5/22 (7 overs)

England won by 89 runs
Riverside Ground, Chester-le-Street
Umpires: Wayne Knights (NZ) and Graham Lloyd (Eng)
Player of the match: Will Jacks (Eng)

- England won the toss and elected to bat.
- Sachindu Colombage (SL) made his ODI debut.
- Joe Root (Eng) scored his 23,000th run in International cricket.
- Pathum Nissanka (SL) scored his 3,000th run in ODIs.
- Kusal Mendis (SL) scored his 5,000th run in ODIs
- Will Jacks (Eng) took his maiden five-wicket haul in ODIs.

=== 2nd ODI ===
24 September 2026
12:30 (D/N)
Scorecard

Sri Lanka; 321/6 (50 overs)	v	England; 305/9 (50 overs)
Kusal Mendis 121 (100); Rehan Ahmed 2/48 (8 overs)		Tom Banton 73 (62); Dunith Wellalage 3/49 (10 overs)

Sri Lanka won by 16 runs
Headingley, Leeds
Umpires: Adrian Holdstock (SA) and James Middlebrook (Eng)
Player of the match: Kusal Mendis (SL)

- Sri Lanka won the toss and elected to bat.

=== 3rd ODI ===
27 September 2026
10:30
Scorecard

England; 355/7 (50 overs)	v	Sri Lanka; 132 (29.1 overs)
Tom Banton 126 (105); Asitha Fernando 4/84 (9 overs)		Kusal Mendis 35 (26); Liam Dawson 3/26 (8 overs)

England won by 223 runs
The Oval, London
Umpires: Wayne Knights (NZ) and Robert White (Eng)
Player of the match: Tom Banton (Eng)

- England won the toss and elected to bat.
- Tom Banton (Eng) scored his maiden century in ODIs.
