= English cricket team in New Zealand in 2025–26 =

International cricket tour

	New Zealand	England
- Dates: 18 October – 1 November 2025
Captains	Mitchell Santner	Harry Brook

One Day International series
- Results: New Zealand won the 3-match series 3–0
Most runs	Daryl Mitchell (178)	Harry Brook (175)
Most wickets	Blair Tickner (8)	Brydon Carse (4)
- Player of the series: Daryl Mitchell (NZ)

Twenty20 International series
- Results: England won the 3-match series 1–0
Most runs	Tim Seifert (62)	Harry Brook (98)
Most wickets	Kyle Jamieson (3)	Adil Rashid (4)
- Player of the series: Harry Brook (Eng)

The England cricket team toured New Zealand in October and November 2025 to play the New Zealand cricket team. The tour consisted of three One Day International (ODI) and three Twenty20 International (T20I) matches. In June 2025, the New Zealand Cricket (NZC) confirmed the fixtures for the tour, as a part of the 2025–26 home international season.

== Squads ==
New Zealand		England	
ODIs	T20Is	ODIs	T20Is
Mitchell Santner (c); Michael Bracewell; Mark Chapman; Kris Clarke; Devon Conway; Jacob Duffy; Zak Foulkes; Matt Henry; ~~Kyle Jamieson~~; Tom Latham (wk); Daryl Mitchell; Rachin Ravindra; Nathan Smith; Blair Tickner; Kane Williamson; Will Young	Mitchell Santner (c); Michael Bracewell; Mark Chapman; Devon Conway; Jacob Duffy; Zak Foulkes; Matt Henry; Bevon Jacobs; Kyle Jamieson; Daryl Mitchell; James Neesham; Rachin Ravindra; Tim Robinson; Tim Seifert (wk)	Harry Brook (c); Rehan Ahmed; Jofra Archer; Sonny Baker; Tom Banton; Jacob Bethell; Jos Buttler (wk); Brydon Carse; Sam Curran; Liam Dawson; Ben Duckett; Jamie Overton; Adil Rashid; Joe Root; Jamie Smith (wk); Luke Wood	Harry Brook (c); Rehan Ahmed; Sonny Baker; Tom Banton; Jacob Bethell; Jos Buttler (wk); Brydon Carse; Jordan Cox; Zak Crawley; Sam Curran; Liam Dawson; Jamie Overton; Adil Rashid; Phil Salt (wk); Luke Wood

On 25 October, Kyle Jamieson was ruled out of the ODI series due to stiffness on his left side. On 27 October, ahead of the second ODI, Blair Tickner was added to the ODI squad as a replacement of Jamieson. On 31 October, Matt Henry was ruled out of the third ODI match due to a left calf strain and was replaced by Kris Clarke.

== T20I series ==
=== 1st T20I ===
18 October 2025
19:15 (N)
Scorecard

England; 153/6 (20 overs)	v	New Zealand
Sam Curran 49* (35); Michael Bracewell 1/10 (2 overs)

No result
Hagley Oval, Christchurch
Umpires: Wayne Knights (NZ) and Donovan Koch (Aus)

- New Zealand won the toss and elected to field.
- No further play was possible due to rain.

=== 2nd T20I ===
20 October 2025
19:15 (N)
Scorecard

England; 236/4 (20 overs)	v	New Zealand; 171 (18 overs)
Phil Salt 85 (56); Kyle Jamieson 2/47 (4 overs)		Tim Seifert 39 (29); Adil Rashid 4/32 (4 overs)

England won by 65 runs
Hagley Oval, Christchurch
Umpires: Cory Black (NZ) and Donovan Koch (Aus)
Player of the match: Harry Brook (Eng)

- New Zealand won the toss and elected to field.

=== 3rd T20I ===
23 October 2025
19:15 (N)
Scorecard

New Zealand; 38/1 (3.4 overs)	v	England
Tim Seifert 23* (11); Brydon Carse 1/25 (1.4 overs)

No result
Eden Park, Auckland
Umpires: Shaun Haig (NZ) and Donovan Koch (Aus)

- England won the toss and elected to field.
- No further play was possible due to rain.

== ODI series ==
=== 1st ODI ===
26 October 2025
14:00 (D/N)
Scorecard

England; 223 (35.2 overs)	v	New Zealand; 224/6 (36.4 overs)
Harry Brook 135 (101); Zak Foulkes 4/41 (7 overs)		Daryl Mitchell 78* (91); Brydon Carse 3/45 (10 overs)

New Zealand won by 4 wickets
Bay Oval, Mount Maunganui
Umpires: Shaun Haig (NZ) and Ahsan Raza (Pak)
Player of the match: Harry Brook (Eng)

- New Zealand won the toss and elected to field.
- Harry Brook (Eng) scored his 1,000th run in ODIs.

=== 2nd ODI ===
29 October 2025
14:00 (D/N)
Scorecard

England; 175 (36 overs)	v	New Zealand; 177/5 (33.1 overs)
Jamie Overton 42 (28); Blair Tickner 4/34 (8 overs)		Daryl Mitchell 56* (59); Jofra Archer 3/23 (10 overs)

New Zealand won by 5 wickets
Seddon Park, Hamilton
Umpires: Cory Black (NZ) and Paul Reiffel (Aus)
Player of the match: Blair Tickner (NZ)

- New Zealand won the toss and elected to field.

=== 3rd ODI ===
1 November 2025
14:00 (D/N)
Scorecard

England; 222 (40.2 overs)	v	New Zealand; 226/8 (44.4 overs)
Jamie Overton 68 (62); Blair Tickner 4/64 (10 overs)		Rachin Ravindra 46 (37); Jamie Overton 2/32 (10 overs)

New Zealand won by 2 wickets
Wellington Regional Stadium, Wellington
Umpires: Shaun Haig (NZ) and Ahsan Raza (Pak)
Player of the match: Blair Tickner (NZ)

- New Zealand won the toss and elected to field.
