= English cricket team in Sri Lanka in 2025–26 =

International cricket tour

	Sri Lanka	England
- Dates: 22 January – 3 February 2026
Captains	Charith Asalanka (ODIs); Dasun Shanaka (T20Is)	Harry Brook

One Day International series
- Results: England won the 3-match series 2–1
Most runs	Pavan Rathnayake (162)	Joe Root (247)
Most wickets	Jeffrey Vandersay (5)	Adil Rashid (7)
- Player of the series: Joe Root (Eng)

Twenty20 International series
- Results: England won the 3-match series 3–0
Most runs	Kusal Mendis (95)	Tom Banton (90)
Most wickets	Dushmantha Chameera (5); Matheesha Pathirana (5)	Adil Rashid (5)
- Player of the series: Sam Curran (Eng)

The England cricket team toured Sri Lanka in January and February 2026 to play the Sri Lanka cricket team. The tour consisted of three One Day International (ODI) and three Twenty20 Internationals (T20I) matches. The T20I series formed part of both teams' preparation ahead of the 2026 Men's T20 World Cup tournament. In August 2025, the Sri Lanka Cricket (SLC) confirmed the fixtures for the tour.

== Squads ==
Sri Lanka		England	
ODIs	T20Is	ODIs	T20Is
Charith Asalanka (c); Asitha Fernando; Wanindu Hasaranga; Janith Liyanage; Pramod Madushan; Eshan Malinga; Kamindu Mendis; Kusal Mendis (wk); Kamil Mishara; Pathum Nissanka; Milan Rathnayake; Pavan Rathnayake; Sadeera Samarawickrama (wk); Dhananjaya de Silva; Maheesh Theekshana; Jeffrey Vandersay; Dunith Wellalage	Dasun Shanaka (c); Charith Asalanka; Dushmantha Chameera; Wanindu Hasaranga; Janith Liyanage; Pramod Madushan; Eshan Malinga; Kusal Mendis (wk); Kamil Mishara; Pathum Nissanka; Matheesha Pathirana; Kusal Perera (wk); Pavan Rathnayake; Dhananjaya de Silva; Maheesh Theekshana; Dunith Wellalage	Harry Brook (c); Rehan Ahmed; Tom Banton; Jacob Bethell; Jos Buttler (wk); Brydon Carse; Zak Crawley; Sam Curran; Liam Dawson; Ben Duckett; Will Jacks; Jamie Overton; Adil Rashid; Joe Root; Luke Wood	Harry Brook (c); Rehan Ahmed; Tom Banton; Jacob Bethell; Jos Buttler (wk); Brydon Carse; Sam Curran; Liam Dawson; Ben Duckett; Will Jacks; Jamie Overton; Adil Rashid; Phil Salt (wk); Josh Tongue; Luke Wood

== ODI series ==
=== 1st ODI ===
22 January 2026
14:30 (D/N)
Scorecard

Sri Lanka; 271/6 (50 overs)	v	England; 252 (49.2 overs)
Kusal Mendis 93* (117); Adil Rashid 3/44 (10 overs)		Ben Duckett 62 (76); Pramod Madushan 3/39 (5.2 overs)

Sri Lanka won by 19 runs
R. Premadasa Stadium, Colombo
Umpires: Rod Tucker (Aus) and Raveendra Wimalasiri (SL)
Player of the match: Dunith Wellalage (SL)

- Sri Lanka won the toss and elected to bat.

=== 2nd ODI ===
24 January 2026
14:30 (D/N)
Scorecard

Sri Lanka; 219 (49.3 overs)	v	England; 223/5 (46.2 overs)
Charith Asalanka 45 (64); Joe Root 2/12 (2.3 overs)		Joe Root 75 (90); Dhananjaya de Silva 2/37 (7 overs)

England won by 5 wickets
R. Premadasa Stadium, Colombo
Umpires: Adrian Holdstock (SA) and Ravindra Kottahachchi (SL)
Player of the match: Joe Root (Eng)

- Sri Lanka won the toss and elected to bat.
- England used six spinners for a total of 40.3 overs, five of them taking wickets; all records for England in ODIs.

=== 3rd ODI ===
27 January 2026
14:30 (D/N)
Scorecard

England; 357/3 (50 overs)	v	Sri Lanka; 304 (46.4 overs)
Harry Brook 136* (66); Dhananjaya de Silva 1/45 (5 overs)		Pavan Rathnayake 121 (114); Will Jacks 2/43 (8 overs)

England won by 53 runs
R. Premadasa Stadium, Colombo
Umpires: Rod Tucker (Aus) and Raveendra Wimalasiri (SL)
Player of the match: Harry Brook (Eng)

- England won the toss and elected to bat.
- Pavan Rathnayake (SL) scored his maiden century in ODIs.

== T20I series ==
=== 1st T20I ===
30 January 2026
19:00 (N)
Scorecard

Sri Lanka; 133 (16.2 overs)	v	England; 125/4 (15 overs)
Kusal Mendis 37 (20); Adil Rashid 3/19 (4 overs)		Phil Salt 46 (35); Eshan Malinga 2/24 (2 overs)

England won by 11 runs (DLS method)
Pallekele International Cricket Stadium, Kandy
Umpires: Ravindra Kottahachchi (SL) and Raveendra Wimalasiri (SL)
Player of the match: Adil Rashid (Eng)

- England won the toss and elected to field.
- The match was reduced to 17 overs per side due to rain.
- England innings curtailed at 15 overs due to rain; DLS par score was 114.
- Kusal Mendis (SL) scored his 12,000th run in international cricket.
- Sam Curran (Eng) took his first hat-trick in T20Is.

=== 2nd T20I ===
1 February 2026
19:00 (N)
Scorecard

Sri Lanka; 189/5 (20 overs)	v	England; 173/4 (16.4 overs)
Pavan Rathnayake 40 (22); Jofra Archer 2/42 (4 overs)		Tom Banton 54* (33); Matheesha Pathirana 2/47 (4 overs)

England won by 6 wickets (DLS method)
Pallekele International Cricket Stadium, Kandy
Umpires: Chamara de Soysa (SL) and Ravindra Kottahachchi (SL)
Player of the match: Tom Banton (Eng)

- England won the toss and elected to field.
- England were set a revised target of 168 runs from 17 overs due to rain.
- Dasun Shanaka (SL) played his 200th match in international cricket.
- Jos Buttler (Eng) became England's most capped player (across formats) of all time.

=== 3rd T20I ===
3 February 2026
19:00 (N)
Scorecard

England; 128/9 (20 overs)	v	Sri Lanka; 116 (19.3 overs)
Sam Curran 58 (48); Dushmantha Chameera 5/24 (4 overs)		Kusal Mendis 26 (26); Jacob Bethell 4/11 (3.3 overs)

England won by 12 runs
Pallekele International Cricket Stadium, Kandy
Umpires: Hemantha Boteju (SL) and Ravindra Kottahachchi (SL)
Player of the match: Sam Curran (Eng)

- England won the toss and elected to bat.
- Kusal Mendis (SL) played his 100th match in T20Is.
- Dushmantha Chameera (SL) took his maiden five-wicket haul in T20Is.
- This was the lowest total successfully defended by England in an unshortened T20I.
