= Pavan Rathnayake =

Sri Lankan cricketer (born 2002)

Pavan Rathnayake පවන් රත්නායක
Personal information
- Born: 24 August 2002 (age 24); Colombo, Sri Lanka
- Batting: Right-handed
- Bowling: Right-arm off-break
- Role: Batsman

International information
- National side: Sri Lanka (2025-present)
- ODI debut (cap 219): 16 November 2025 v Pakistan
- Last ODI: 22 October 2026 v England
- T20I debut (cap 112): 25 November 2025 v Zimbabwe
- Last T20I: 14 June 2026 v West Indies

Domestic team information
- Years: Team
- 2019–2020: Police SC
- 2021–present: Colombo Cricket Club
- 2023–present: Dambulla
- 2024: Kandy Falcons
- 2026: Dambulla Sixers

Career statistics
Competition	ODI	T20I	FC	LA
Matches	11	15	64	98
Runs scored	506	271	4,210	3,244
Batting average	50.60	22.58	49.52	46.34
100s/50s	2/1	0/2	14/15	7/10
Top score	130	60	240	158*
Balls bowled	6	12	252	30
Wickets	0	2	3	0
Bowling average	–	5.50	58.66	–
5 wickets in innings	–	0	0	–
10 wickets in match	–	0	0	–
Best bowling	–	2/11	1/11	–
Catches/stumpings	4/	4/–	89/6	55/4
- Source: Cricinfo, 22 October 2026

Pavan Rathnayake (Sinhala: පවන් රත්නායක, [paʋan ratnaːjəkə]; born 24 August 2002) is a Sri Lankan cricketer. He made his first-class debut for Sri Lanka Police Sports Club in Tier B of the 2018–19 Premier League Tournament on 17 April 2019. He made his Twenty20 debut on 10 March 2021, for Colombo Cricket Club in the 2020–21 SLC Twenty20 Tournament. In August 2021, he was named in the SLC Blues team for the 2021 SLC Invitational T20 League tournament.

== International career ==
=== Key ===
- † – Man of the match

=== ODI centuries ===
Pavan Rathnayake currently has 3 centuries in his career which all 3 were against the England Team. He had a great tournament in the Pakistan ODI Tri-Series where he scored 427 runs across 5 matches with an average of 106.75 also striking at 122.70.

One Day International centuries scored by Pavan Rathnayake
No.	Score	Against	Pos.	Inn.	SR	Venue	H/A/N	Date	Result	Ref
1	121	England	4	2	105.22	R. Premadasa Stadium, Colombo	Home	27 January 2026	Lost	
2	130 †	England	4	2	122.64	Rawalpindi Cricket Stadium, Rawalpindi	Neutral	22 October 2026	Won	
3	118	England	4	2	153.25	Gaddafi Stadium, Lahore	Neutral	29 October 2026	Lost	
