= England cricket team =

Men's national cricket team

England
- Association: England and Wales Cricket Board

Personnel
- Test captain: Joe Root
- One Day captain: Harry Brook
- T20I captain: Harry Brook
- Coach: Stephen Fleming (Test); Brendon McCullum (ODIs & T20s)

History
- Test status acquired: 1877; 149 years ago

International Cricket Council
- ICC status: Full Membership (1909; 117 years ago)
- ICC region: Europe
ICC Rankings	Current	Best-ever
Test	5th	1st (1 June 1955)
ODI	8th	1st (1 January 1981)
T20I	1st	1st (24 October 2011)

Tests
- First Test: v. Australia at the Melbourne Cricket Ground, Melbourne; 15–19 March 1877
- Last Test: v. Pakistan at Edgbaston, Birmingham; 9–12 September 2026
Tests	Played	Won/Lost
Total	1,100	408/336 (356 draws)
This year	7	4/3 (0 draws)
- World Test Championship appearances: 3 (first in 2021)
- Best result: Fourth place (2021, 2023)

One Day Internationals
- First ODI: v. Australia at the Melbourne Cricket Ground, Melbourne; 5 January 1971
- Last ODI: v. Australia at Bellerive Oval, Hobart; 18 November 2026
ODIs	Played	Won/Lost
Total	836	416/380 (9 ties, 31 no results)
This year	16	9/7 (0 ties, 0 no results)
- World Cup appearances: 13 (first in 1975)
- Best result: Champions (2019)

T20 Internationals
- First T20I: v. Australia at the Ageas Bowl, Southampton; 13 June 2005
- Last T20I: v. Australia at Melbourne Cricket Ground, Melbourne; 21 November 2026
T20Is	Played	Won/Lost
Total	234	128/93 (2 ties, 11 no results)
This year	20	16/3 (0 ties, 1 no result)
- T20 World Cup appearances: 10 (first in 2007)
- Best result: Champions (2010, 2022)
Test kit
ODI kit
T20I kit
- As of 21 November 2026

The England men's cricket team represents England and Wales in international cricket. Since 1997, it has been governed by the England and Wales Cricket Board (ECB), having been previously governed by Marylebone Cricket Club (the MCC) since 1903. England and Wales, as founding nations, are a Full Member of the International Cricket Council (ICC) with Test, One Day International (ODI) and Twenty20 International (T20I) status. Until the 1990s, Scottish and Irish players also played for England as those countries were not yet ICC members in their own right.

England and Australia were the first teams to play a Test match (15–19 March 1877), and along with South Africa, these nations formed the Imperial Cricket Conference (the predecessor to today's International Cricket Council) on 15 June 1909. England and Australia also played the first ODI on 5 January 1971. England's first T20I was played on 13 June 2005, once more against Australia.

As of 21 November 2026, England have played 1,100 Test matches, winning 408 and losing 336 (with 356 draws). In the Test series against Australia, England play for The Ashes, one of the most famous trophies in all of sport, and they have won the urn on 32 occasions. England have also played 836 ODIs, winning 416. They have appeared in the final of the Cricket World Cup four times (1979, 1987, 1992), winning their first in 2019; they have also finished as runners-up in two ICC Champions Trophies (2004 and 2013). England have played 234 T20Is, winning 128. They won the ICC T20 World Cup in 2010 and 2022, and were runners-up in 2016.

As of October 2026, England are ranked fifth in Tests, sixth in ODIs and first in T20Is by the ICC.

== History ==
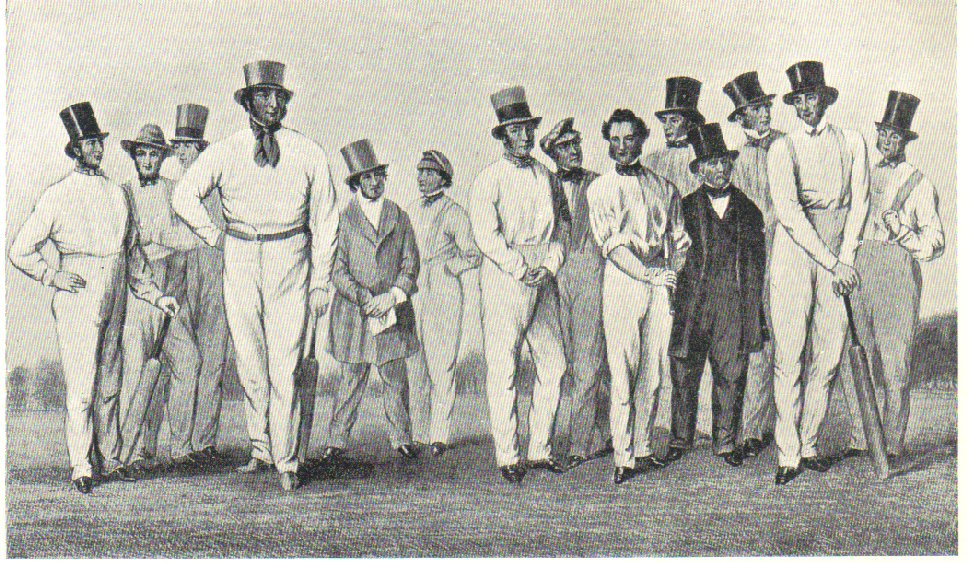
The All-England Eleven in 1846

The first recorded incidence of a team with a claim to represent England comes from 9 July 1739 when an "All-England" team, which consisted of 11 gentlemen from any part of England exclusive of Kent, played against "the Unconquerable County" of Kent and lost by a margin of "very few notches". Such matches were repeated on numerous occasions for the best part of a century.

In 1846 William Clarke formed the All-England Eleven. This team eventually competed against a United All-England Eleven with annual matches occurring between 1847 and 1856. These matches were arguably the most important contest of the English season if judged by the quality of the players.

=== Early tours ===
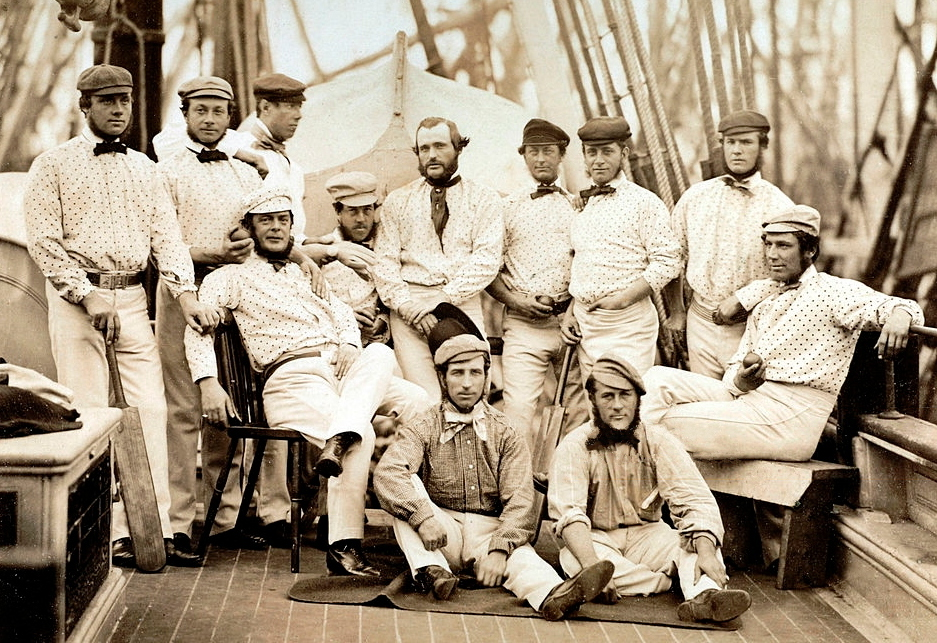
The 1859 English team in North America

The first overseas tour occurred in September 1859 with England touring North America. This team had six players from the All-England Eleven, six from the United All-England Eleven and was captained by George Parr.

With the outbreak of the American Civil War, attention turned elsewhere. English tourists visited Australia in 1861–62 with this first tour organised as a commercial venture by Messrs Spiers and Pond, restaurateurs of Melbourne. Most matches played during tours prior to 1877 were "against odds", with the opposing team fielding more than 11 players to make for a more even contest. This first Australian tour was mostly against odds of at least 18/11.

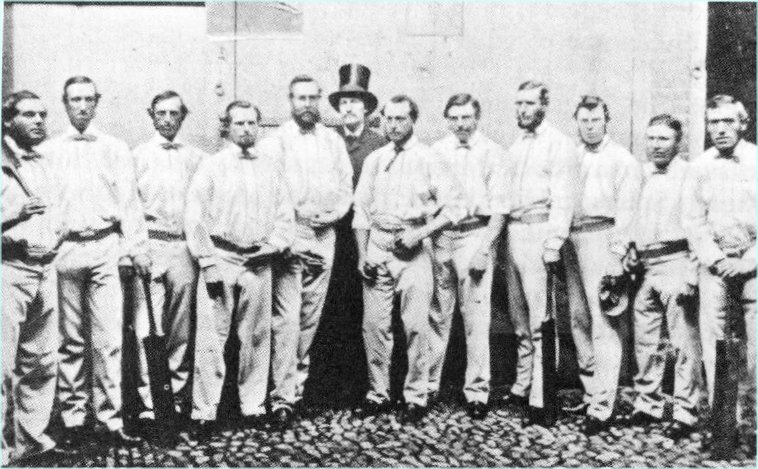
The first England team to tour southern Australia in 1861–62

The tour was so successful that Parr led a second tour in 1863–64. James Lillywhite led a subsequent England team which sailed on the P&O steamship Poonah on 21 September 1876. They played a combined Australian XI, for once on even terms of 11-a-side. The match, starting on 15 March 1877 at the Melbourne Cricket Ground came to be regarded as the inaugural Test match. The combined Australian XI won this Test match by 45 runs with Charles Bannerman of Australia scoring the first Test century. At the time, the match was promoted as James Lillywhite's XI v Combined Victoria and New South Wales. The teams played a return match on the same ground at Easter, 1877, when Lillywhite's team avenged their loss with a victory by four wickets. The first Test match on English soil occurred in 1880 with England victorious; this was the first time England fielded a fully representative team with W. G. Grace included in the team.

=== 1880s ===
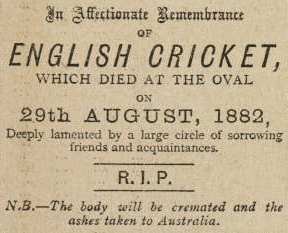
The death notice printed on The Sporting Times newspaper which first named the Ashes

England lost their first home series 1–0 in 1882, with The Sporting Times printing an obituary on English cricket:

In Affectionate Remembrance

OF
ENGLISH CRICKET,
WHICH DIED AT THE OVAL
ON
29 August 1882,
Deeply lamented by a large circle of sorrowing
friends and acquaintances.
R. I. P.

N.B.—The body will be cremated and the
ashes taken to Australia.

As a result of this loss, the tour of 1882–83 was dubbed by England captain Ivo Bligh as "the quest to regain the ashes". England, with a mixture of amateurs and professionals, won the series 2–1. Bligh was presented with an urn that contained some ashes, which have variously been said to be of a bail, ball or even a woman's veil, and so The Ashes was born. A fourth match was then played which Australia won by four wickets. However, the match was not considered part of the Ashes series. England dominated many of these early contests, with England winning the Ashes series 10 times between 1884 and 1898. During this period England also played their first Test match against South Africa in 1889 at Port Elizabeth.

=== 1890s ===
England won the 1890 Ashes series 2–0, with the third match of the series being the first Test match to be abandoned. England lost 2–1 in the 1891–92 series, although England regained the urn the following year. England again won the 1894–95 series, winning 3–2 under the leadership of Andrew Stoddart. In 1895–96, England played South Africa, winning all Tests in the series. The 1899 Ashes series was the first tour where the MCC and the counties appointed a selection committee. There were three active players: Grace, Lord Hawke and Warwickshire captain Herbert Bainbridge. Prior to this, England teams for home Tests had been chosen by the club on whose ground the match was to be played. England lost the 1899 Ashes series 1–0, with Grace making his final Test appearance in the first match of the series.

=== 1900s ===
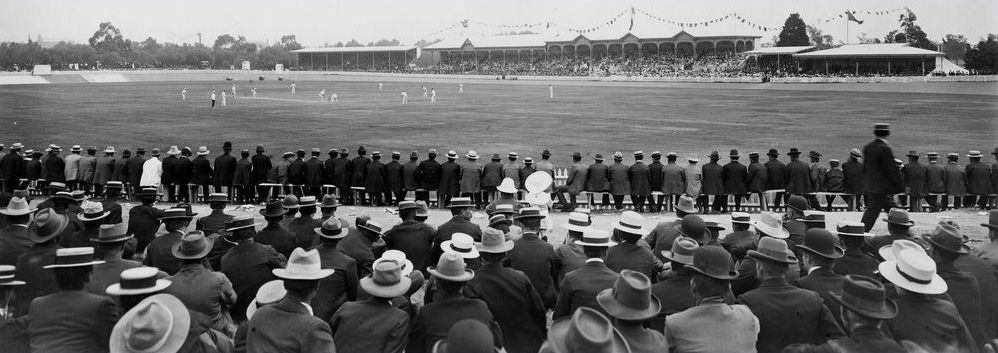
The Adelaide Oval, second day of the third test between Australia and England, 20 January 1902. Australia won by 4 wickets.

The start of the 20th century saw mixed results for England as they lost four of the eight Ashes series between 1900 and 1914. During this period, England lost their first series against South Africa in the 1905–06 season 4–1 as their batting faltered.

England lost their first series of the new century to Australia in 1901–02 Ashes. Australia also won the 1902 series, which was memorable for exciting cricket, including Gilbert Jessop scoring a Test century in just 70 minutes. England regained the Ashes in 1904 under the captaincy of Pelham Warner. R. E. Foster scored 287 on his debut and Wilfred Rhodes took 15 wickets in a match. In 1905–06, England lost 4–1 against South Africa. England avenged the defeat in 1907, when they won the series 1–0 under the captaincy of Foster. However, they lost the 1909 Ashes series against Australia, using 25 players in the process. England also lost to South Africa, with Jack Hobbs scoring his first of 15 centuries on the tour.

=== 1910s ===
England toured Australia in 1911–12 and beat their opponents 4–1. The team included the likes of Rhodes, Hobbs, Frank Woolley and Sydney Barnes. England lost the first match of the series but bounced back and won the next four Tests. This proved to be the last Ashes series before the war.

The 1912 season saw England take part in a unique experiment. A nine-Test triangular tournament involving England, South Africa and Australia was set up. The series was hampered by a very wet summer and player disputes however and the tournament was considered a failure with the Daily Telegraph stating:

Nine Tests provide a surfeit of cricket, and contests between Australia and South Africa are not a great attraction to the British public.

With Australia sending a weakened team and the South African bowlers being ineffective England dominated the tournament winning four of their six matches. The match between Australia and South Africa at Lord's was visited by King George V, the first time a reigning monarch had watched Test cricket. England went on one more tour before the outbreak of the First World War, beating South Africa 4–0, with Barnes taking 49 wickets in the series.

=== 1920s ===
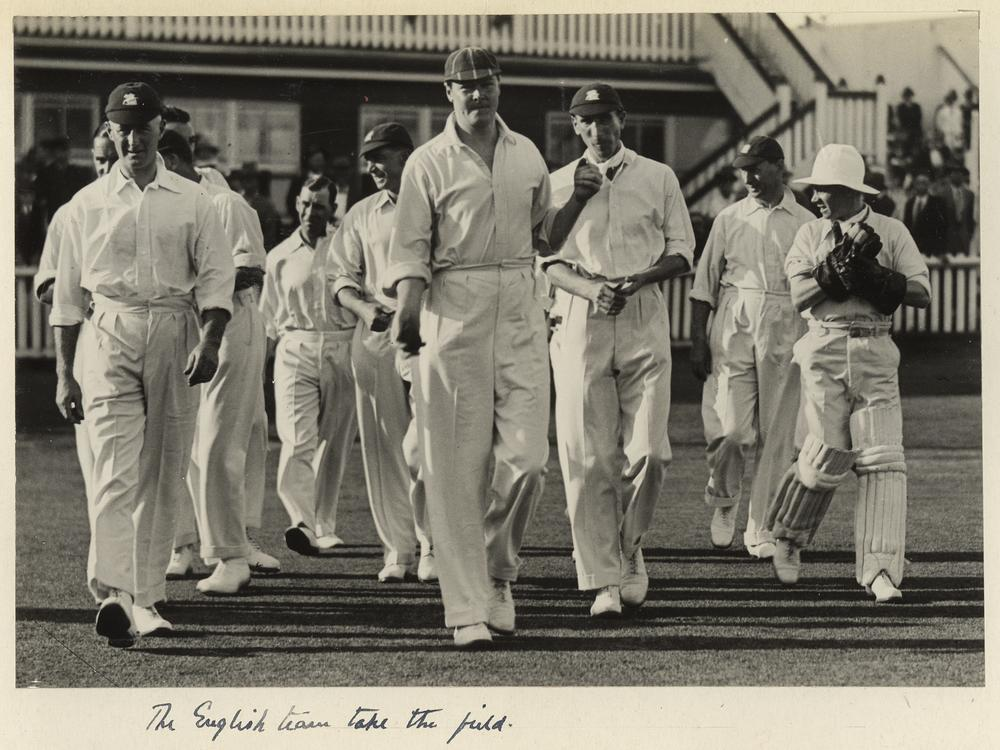
English cricket team at the Test match at the Brisbane Exhibition Ground in 1928. England won by a record margin of 675 runs.

England's first match after the war was in the 1920–21 season against Australia. Still feeling the effects of the war England went down to a series of crushing defeats and suffered their first whitewash losing the series 5–0. Six Australians scored hundreds while Mailey spun out 36 English batsmen. Things were no better in the next few Ashes series losing the 1921 Ashes series 3–0 and the 1924–25 Ashes 4–1. England's fortunes were to change in 1926 as they regained the Ashes and were a formidable team during this period dispatching Australia 4–1 in the 1928–29 Ashes tour.

In the same year the West Indies became the fourth nation to be granted Test status and played their first game against England. England won each of these three Tests by an innings, and a view was expressed in the press that their elevation had proved a mistake although Learie Constantine did the double on the tour. In the 1929–30 season England went on two concurrent tours with one team going to New Zealand (who were granted Test status earlier that year) and the other to the West Indies. Despite sending two separate teams England won against New Zealand 1–0 and drawn with the West Indies 1–1.

=== 1930s ===
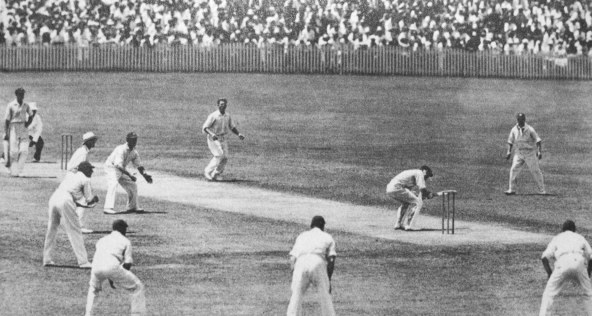
Bill Woodfull evades a Bodyline ball during the English cricket team tour in Australia in 1932–33. Note the number of leg-side fielders.

The 1930 Ashes series saw a young Don Bradman dominate the tour, scoring 974 runs in his seven Test innings. He scored 254 at Lord's, 334 at Headingley and 232 at The Oval. Australia regained the Ashes winning the series 2–1. As a result of Bradman's prolific run-scoring the England captain Douglas Jardine chose to develop the already existing leg theory into fast leg theory, or bodyline, as a tactic to stop Bradman. Fast leg theory involved bowling fast balls directly at the batsman's body. The batsman would need to defend himself, and if he touched the ball with the bat, he risked being caught by one of a large number of fielders placed on the leg side.

Using Jardine's fast leg theory, England won the next Ashes series 4–1, but complaints about the Bodyline tactic caused crowd disruption on the tour, and threats of diplomatic action from the Australian Cricket Board, which during the tour sent the following cable to the MCC in London:

Bodyline bowling assumed such proportions as to menace best interests of game, making protection of body by batsmen the main consideration. Causing intensely bitter feeling between players as well as injury. In our opinion is unsportsmanlike. Unless stopped at once likely to upset friendly relations existing between Australia and England.

Later, Jardine was removed from the captaincy and the Laws of Cricket changed so that no more than one fast ball aimed at the body was permitted per over, and having more than two fielders behind square leg was banned.

England's following tour of India in the 1933–34 season was the first Test match to be staged in the subcontinent. The series was also notable for Stan Nichols and Nobby Clark bowling so many bouncers that the Indian batsman wore solar toupées instead of caps to protect themselves. Australia won the 1934 Ashes series 2–1 and kept the urn for the following 19 years.

England drew the 1938 Ashes, meaning Australia retained the urn. England went into the final match of the series at The Oval 1–0 down, but won the final game by an innings and 579 runs. Len Hutton made the highest ever Test score by an Englishman, making 364 in England first innings to help them reach 903, their highest ever score against Australia.

The 1938–39 tour of South Africa saw another experiment with the deciding Test being a timeless Test that was played to a finish. England lead 1–0 going into the final timeless match at Durban. Despite the final Test being 'timeless', the game ended in a draw after 10 days as England had to catch the train to catch the boat home. A record 1,981 runs were scored, and the concept of timeless Tests was abandoned. England hosted the West Indies in 1939 before the Second World War, although a team for an MCC tour of India was selected more in hope than expectation of the matches being played.

=== 1940s ===
Test cricket resumed after the war in 1946, and England won their first match back against India. However, they struggled in the 1946–47 Ashes series, losing 3–0 in Australia under Wally Hammond's captaincy. England beat South Africa 3–0 in 1947 with Denis Compton scoring 1,187 runs in the series.

The 1947–48 series against the West Indies was another disappointment for England, with the team losing 2–0 following injuries to several key players. England suffered further humiliation against Bradman's invincible team in the 1948 Ashes series. Hutton was controversially dropped for the third Test, and England were bowled out for just 52 at The Oval. The series proved to be Bradman's final Ashes series.

In 1948–49, England beat South Africa 2–0 under the captaincy of George Mann. The series included a record breaking stand of 359 between Hutton and Cyril Washbrook. The decade ended with England drawing the Test series against New Zealand, with every match ending in a draw.

=== 1950s ===
On 29 June 1950 England lost to the West Indies for the first time, with this being followed by a 3–1 series loss when they lost at The Oval on 16 August 1950.

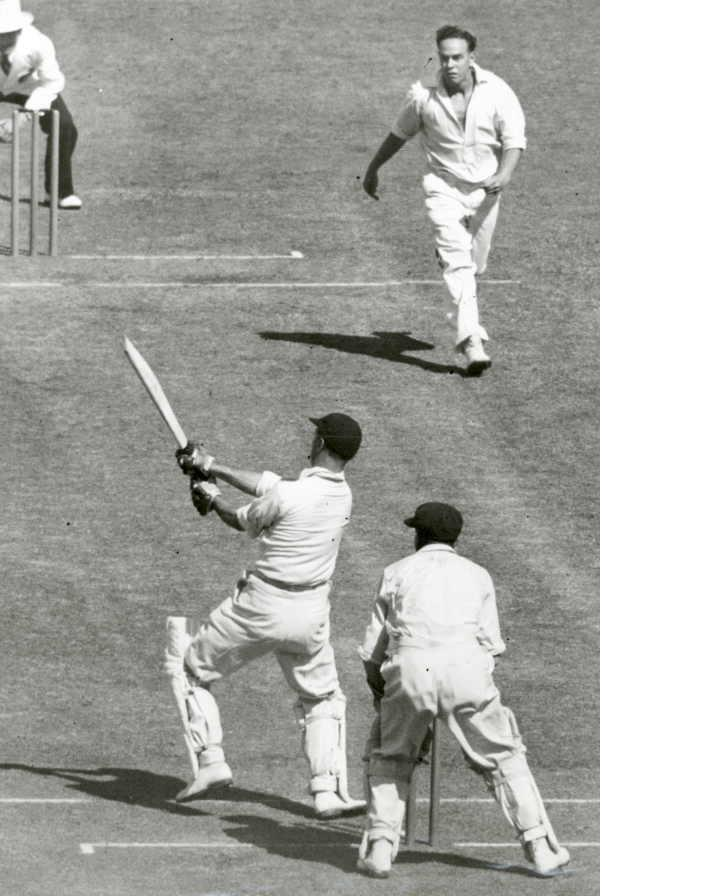
Len Hutton batting during the 5th Test Match of the 1950–51 Ashes series played at the Melbourne Cricket Ground. Ian Johnson is bowling

Their fortunes against Australia changed on the 1953 Ashes tour as they won the series 1–0. England did not lose a series between their 1950–51 and 1958–59 tours of Australia and secured famous victory in 1954–55 under the captaincy of Len Hutton, thanks to Frank Tyson whose 6/85 at Sydney and 7/27 at Melbourne are remembered as the fastest bowling ever seen in Australia. The 1956 series was remembered for the bowling of Jim Laker who took 46 wickets at an average of 9.62, including figures of 19/90 at Old Trafford. After drawing to South Africa, England defeated the West Indies and New Zealand comfortably.

The England team then left for Australia in the 1958–59 season with a team that had been hailed as the strongest ever to leave on an Ashes tour but lost the series 4–0 as Richie Benaud's revitalised Australians were too strong, with England struggling with the bat throughout the series.

On 24 August 1959, England inflicted its only 5–0 whitewash over India. All out for 194 at The Oval, India lost the last test by an innings. England's batsman Ken Barrington and Colin Cowdrey both had an excellent series with the bat, with Barrington scoring 357 runs across the series and Cowdrey scoring 344.

=== 1960s ===
The early and middle 1960s were poor periods for English cricket. Despite England's strength on paper, Australia held the Ashes and the West Indies dominated England in the early part of the decade. May stood down as captain in 1961 following the 1961 Ashes defeat.

Ted Dexter succeeded him as captain but England continued to suffer indifferent results. In 1961–62, they beat Pakistan, but also lost to India. The following year saw England and Australia tie the 1962–63 Ashes series 1–1, meaning Australia retained the urn. Despite beating New Zealand 3–0, England went on to lose to the West Indies, and again failed in the 1964 Ashes, losing the home series 1–0, which marked the end of Dexter's captaincy.

However, from 1968 to 1971 they played 27 consecutive Test matches without defeat, winning 9 and drawing 18 (including the abandoned Test at Melbourne in 1970–71). The sequence began when they drew with Australia at Lord's in the Second Test of the 1968 Ashes series and ended in 1971 when India won the Third Test at The Oval by four wickets. They played 13 Tests with only one defeat immediately beforehand and so played a total of 40 consecutive Tests with only one defeat, dating from their innings victory over the West Indies at The Oval in 1966. During this period they beat New Zealand, India, the West Indies, and Pakistan, and under Ray Illingworth's leadership, regained The Ashes from Australia in 1970–71.

=== 1970s ===
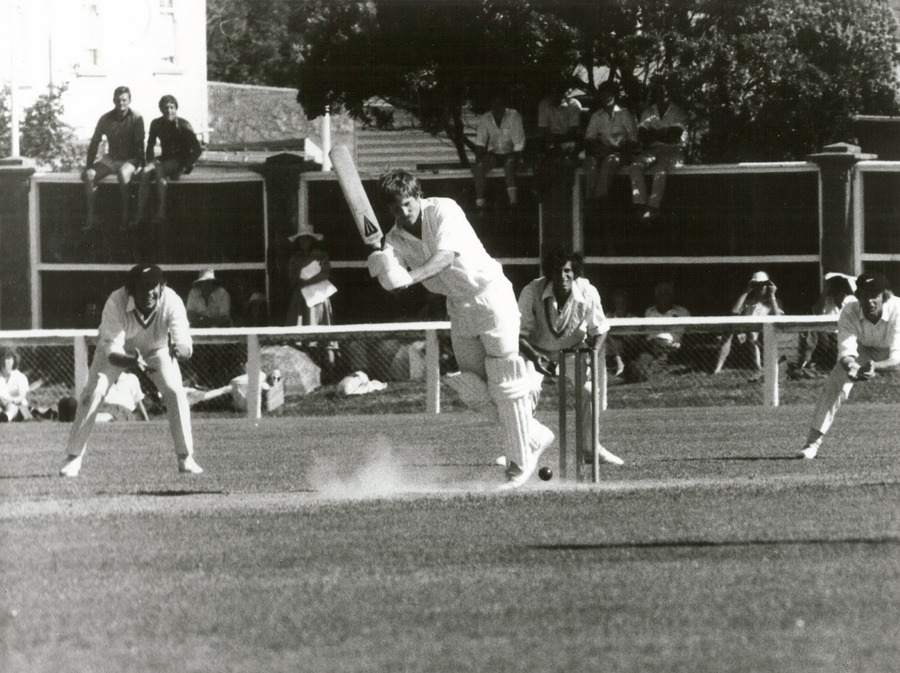
Ian Botham batting against New Zealand during a test match in February 1978 at Basin Reserve

The 1970s, for the England team, can be largely split into three parts. Early in the decade, Illingworth's team dominated world cricket, winning the Ashes away in 1971 and then retaining them at home in 1972. The same team beat Pakistan at home in 1971 and played by far the better cricket against India that season. However, England were largely helped by the rain to sneak the Pakistan series 1–0 but the same rain saved India twice and one England collapse saw them lose to India. This was, however, one of (if not the) strongest England team ever with the likes of Illingworth, Geoffrey Boycott, John Edrich, Basil D'Oliveira, Dennis Amiss, Alan Knott, John Snow and Derek Underwood at its core. The mid-1970s were more turbulent. Illingworth and several others had refused to tour India in 1972–73 which led to a clamour for Illingworth's job by the end of that summer – England had just been beaten 2–0 by a flamboyant West Indies team – with several England players well over 35. Mike Denness was the surprising choice but only lasted 18 months; his results against poor opposition were good, but England were badly exposed as ageing and lacking in good fast bowling against the 1974–75 Australians, losing that series 4–1 to lose the Ashes.

Denness was replaced in 1975 by Tony Greig. While he managed to avoid losing to Australia, his team were largely thrashed the following year by the young and very much upcoming West Indies for whom Greig's infamous "grovel" remark acted as motivation. Greig's finest hour as England's captain was the 1976–77 win over India in India. When Greig was discovered as being instrumental in World Series Cricket, he was sacked, and replaced by Mike Brearley.

Brearley's team showed again the hyperbole that is often spoken when one team dominates in cricket. While his team of 1977–80 contained some young players who went on to become England greats, most notably future captains Ian Botham, David Gower and Graham Gooch, their opponents were often very much weakened by the absence of their World Series players, especially in 1978, when England drew New Zealand 1–1 and Pakistan 2–0 before thrashing what was effectively Australia's 2nd XI 5–1 in 1978–79.

=== 1980s ===
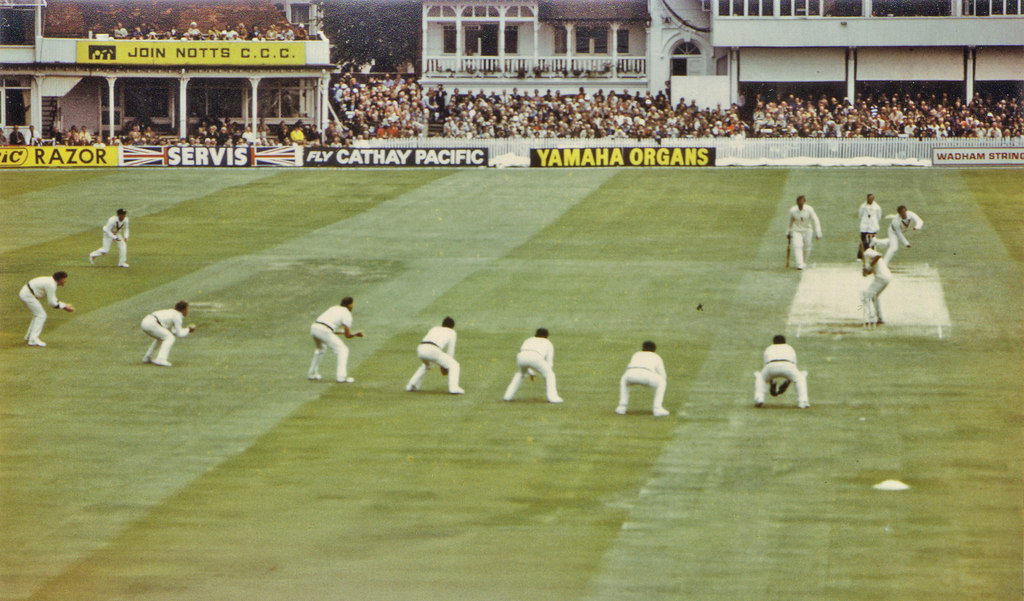
Terry Alderman bowling to David Gower during the 1981 Ashes test at Trent Bridge

The England team, with Brearley's exit in 1980, was never truly settled throughout the 1980s, which will probably be remembered as a low point for the team. While some of the great players like Botham, Gooch and Gower had fine careers, the team seldom succeeded in beating good opposition throughout the decade and did not score a home Test victory (except against minnows Sri Lanka) between September 1985 and July 1990.

Botham took over the captaincy in 1980 and they put up a good fight against the West Indies, losing a five match Test series 1–0, although England were humbled in the return series. After scoring a pair in the first Test against Australia, Botham lost the captaincy due to his poor form, and was replaced by Brearley. Botham returned to form and played exceptionally in the remainder of the series, being named man of the match in the third, fourth and fifth Tests. The series became known as Botham's Ashes as England recorded a 3–1 victory.

Keith Fletcher took over as captain in 1981, but England lost his first series in charge against India. Bob Willis took over as captain in 1982 and enjoyed victories over India and Pakistan, but lost the Ashes after Australia clinched the series 2–1. England hosted the World Cup in 1983 and reached the semi-finals, but their Test form remained poor, as they suffered defeats against New Zealand, Pakistan and the West Indies.

Gower took over as skipper in 1984 and led the team to a 2–1 victory over India. They went on to win the 1985 Ashes 3–1, although after this came a poor run of form. Defeat to the West Indies dented the team's confidence, and they went on to lose to India 2–0. In 1986, Micky Stewart was appointed the first full-time England coach. England beat New Zealand, but there was little hope of them retaining the Ashes in 1986–87. However, despite being described as a team that 'can't bat, can't bowl and can't field', they went on to win the series 2–1.

After losing consecutive series against Pakistan, England drew a three match Test series against New Zealand 0–0. They reached the final of the 1987 World Cup, but lost by seven runs against Australia. After losing 4–0 to the West Indies, England lost the Ashes to a resurgent Australia led by Allan Border. With the likes of Gatting banned following a rebel tour to South Africa, a new look England team suffered defeat again against the West Indies, although this time by a margin of 2–1.

=== 1990s ===
If the 1980s were a low point for English Test cricket, then the 1990s were only a slight improvement. The arrival of Gooch as captain in 1990 forced a move toward more professionalism and especially fitness though it took some time for old habits to die. Creditable performances against India and New Zealand in 1990 were followed by a hard-fought draw against the 1991 West Indies and a strong performance in the 1992 Cricket World Cup in which the England team finished as runners-up for the second consecutive World Cup, but landmark losses against Australia in 1990–91 and especially Pakistan in 1992 showed England up badly in terms of bowling. So bad was England's bowling in 1993 that Rod Marsh described England's pace attack at one point as "pie throwers". Having lost three of the first four Tests played in England in 1993, Gooch resigned to be replaced by Michael Atherton.1992 also saw Scotland sever ties with the England and Wales team, and begin to compete as the Scotland national team.

More selectorial problems abounded during Atherton's reign as new chairman of selectors and coach Ray Illingworth (then into his 60s) assumed almost sole responsibility for the team off the field. The youth policy which had seen England emerge from the West Indies tour of 1993–94 with some credit (though losing to a seasoned Windies team) was abandoned and players such as Gatting and Gooch were persisted with when well into their 30s and 40s. England continued to do well at home against weaker opponents such as India, New Zealand and a West Indies team beginning to fade but struggled badly against improving teams like Pakistan and South Africa. Atherton had offered his resignation after losing the 1997 Ashes series 3–2 having been 1–0 up after two matches – eventually to resign one series later in early 1998. England, looking for talent, went through a whole raft of new players during this period, such as Ronnie Irani, Adam Hollioake, Craig White, Graeme Hick and Mark Ramprakash. Alec Stewart took the reins as captain in 1998, but another losing Ashes series and early World Cup exit cost him Test and ODI captaincy in 1999. This should not detract from the 1998 home Test series where England showed great fortitude to beat a powerful South African team 2–1.

Another reason for their poor performances were the demands of County Cricket teams on their players, meaning that England could rarely field a full-strength team on their tours. This eventually led to the ECB taking over from the MCC as the governing body of England and the implementation of central contracts. By 1999, with coach David Lloyd resigning after the World Cup exit and new captain Nasser Hussain just appointed, England hit rock bottom (literally ranked as the lowest-rated Test nation) after losing 2–1 to New Zealand in shambolic fashion. Hussain was booed on the Oval balcony as the crowd jeered "We've got the worst team in the world" to the tune of "He's Got the Whole World in His Hands".

=== 2000s ===
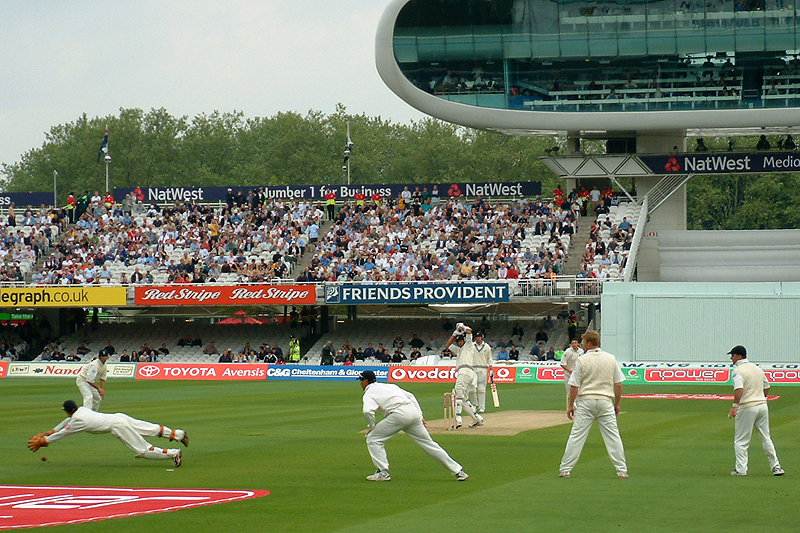
England v New Zealand test match at Lord's in 2004

Central contracts were installed – reducing players workloads – and following the arrival of Zimbabwean coach Duncan Fletcher, England thrashed the fallen West Indies 3–1. England's results in Asia improved that winter with series wins against both Pakistan and Sri Lanka. Hussain's team had a far harder edge to it, avoiding the anticipated "Greenwash" in the 2001 Ashes series against the all-powerful Australian team. The nucleus the team was slowly coming together as players such as Hussain himself, Graham Thorpe, Darren Gough and Ashley Giles began to be regularly selected. By 2003 though, having endured another Ashes drubbing as well as another first-round exit from the World Cup, Hussain resigned as captain after one Test against South Africa.

Michael Vaughan took over, with players encouraged to express themselves. England won five consecutive Test series prior to facing Australia in the 2005 Ashes series, taking the team to second place in the ICC Test Championship table. During this period England defeated the West Indies home and away, New Zealand, and Bangladesh at home, and South Africa in South Africa. In June 2005, England played its first ever T20 international match, defeating Australia by 100 runs. Later that year, England defeated Australia 2–1 in a thrilling series to regain the Ashes for the first time in 16 years, having lost them in 1989. Following the 2005 Ashes win, the team suffered from a spate of serious injuries to key players such as Vaughan, Giles, Andrew Flintoff and Simon Jones. As a result, the team underwent an enforced period of transition. A 2–0 defeat in Pakistan was followed by two drawn away series with India and Sri Lanka.

In the home Test series victory against Pakistan in July and August 2006, several promising new players emerged. Most notable were the left-arm orthodox spin bowler Monty Panesar, the first Sikh to play Test cricket for England, and left-handed opening batsman Alastair Cook. The 2006–07 Ashes series was keenly anticipated and was expected to provide a level of competition comparable to the 2005 series. In the event, England, captained by Flintoff who was deputising for the injured Vaughan, lost all five Tests to concede the first Ashes whitewash in 86 years.

In the 2007 Cricket World Cup, England lost to most of the Test playing nations they faced, beating only the West Indies and Bangladesh, although they also avoided defeat by any of the non-Test playing nations. Even so, the unimpressive nature of most of their victories in the tournament, combined with heavy defeats by New Zealand, Australia and South Africa, left many commentators criticising the manner in which the England team approached the one-day game. Coach Duncan Fletcher resigned after eight years in the job as a result and was succeeded by former Sussex coach Peter Moores.

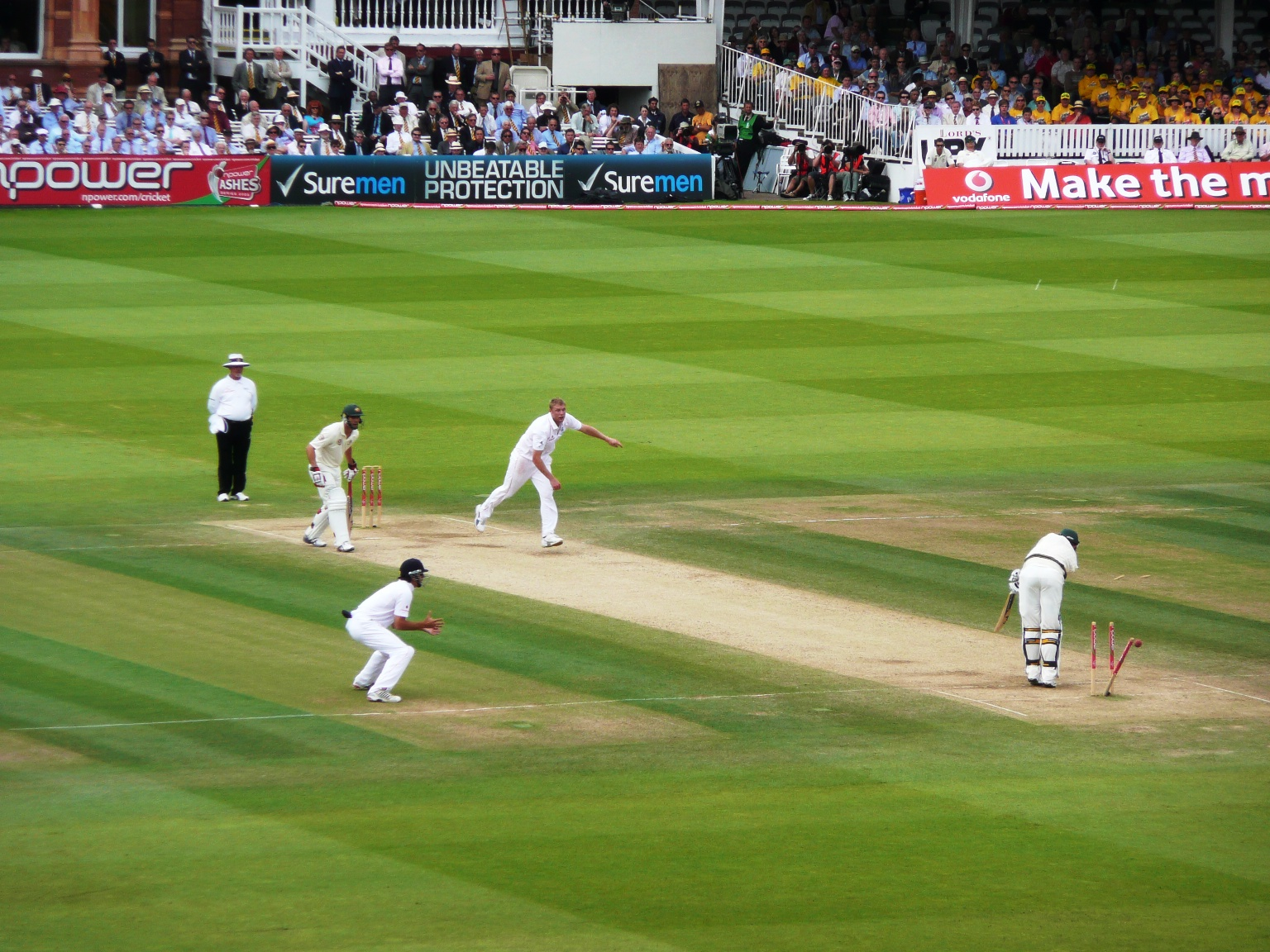
Andrew Flintoff bowling out Peter Siddle's during the 2nd 2009 Ashes Test at Lord's

In 2007–08, England toured Sri Lanka and New Zealand, losing the first series 1–0 and winning the second 2–1. These series were followed up at home in May 2008 with a 2–0 home series win against New Zealand, with the results easing pressure on Moores – who was not at ease with his team, particularly star batsman Kevin Pietersen. Pietersen succeeded Vaughan as captain in June 2008, after England had been well beaten by South Africa at home. The poor relationship between the two came to a head on the 2008–09 tour to India. England lost the series 1–0 and both men resigned their positions, although Pietersen remained a member of the England team. Moores was replaced as coach by Zimbabwean Andy Flower. Against this background, England toured the West Indies under the captaincy of Andrew Strauss and, in a disappointing performance, lost the Test series 1–0.

The 2009 Ashes series featured the first Test match played in Wales, at Sophia Gardens, Cardiff. England drew the match thanks to a last-wicket stand by bowlers James Anderson and Panesar. A victory for each team followed before the series was decided at The Oval. Thanks to fine bowling by Stuart Broad and Graeme Swann and a debut century by Jonathan Trott, England regained the Ashes.

=== 2010s ===
After a drawn Test series in South Africa, England won their first ever ICC event, the 2010 World Twenty20, with a seven-wicket win over Australia in Barbados. The following winter in the 2010–11 Ashes, they beat Australia 3–1 to retain the urn and record their first series win in Australia for 24 years. Furthermore, all three of their wins were by an innings – the first time a touring team had ever recorded three innings victories in a single Test series, Alastair Cook earning Man of the Series with 766 runs.

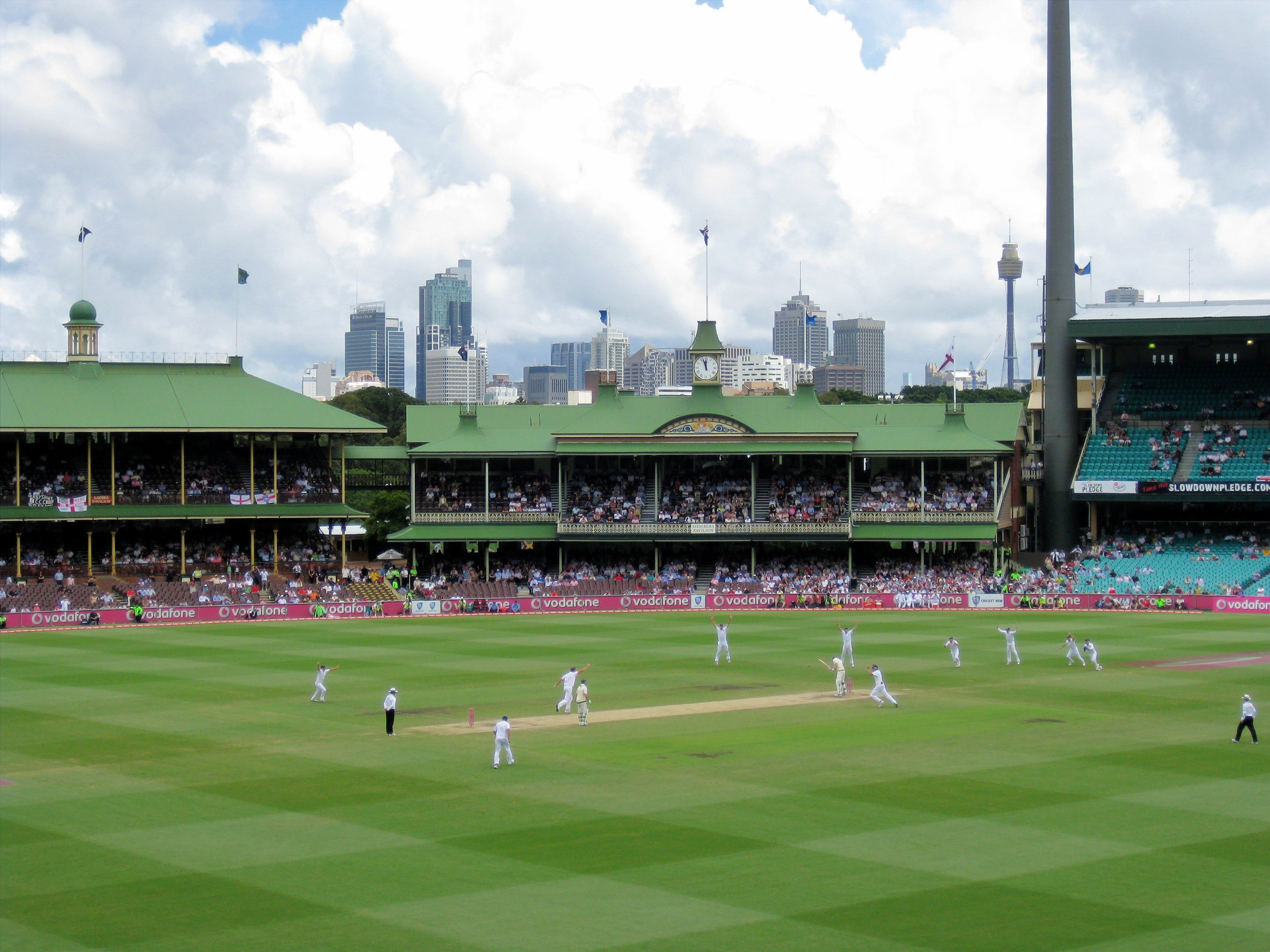
England players celebrate in the field as Chris Tremlett takes the winning wicket in the 2010–11 Ashes series at the SCG.

England struggled to match their Test form in the 2011 Cricket World Cup. Despite beating South Africa and tying with eventual winners India, England suffered shock losses to Ireland and Bangladesh before losing in the quarter-finals to Sri Lanka. However the team's excellent form in the Test match arena continued and on 13 August 2011, they became the world's top-ranked Test team after comfortably whitewashing India 4–0, their sixth consecutive series victory and eighth in the past nine series. However, this status only lasted a year – having lost 3–0 to Pakistan over the winter, England were beaten 2–0 by South Africa, who replaced them at the top of the rankings. It was their first home series loss since 2008, against the same opposition. This loss saw the resignation of Strauss as captain and his retirement from cricket.

Cook, who was already in charge of the ODI team, replaced Strauss and led England to a 2–1 victory in India – their first in the country since 1984–85. In doing so, he became the first captain to score centuries in his first five Tests as captain and became England's leading century-maker with 23 centuries to his name. After finishing as runners-up in the ICC Champions Trophy, England faced Australia in back-to-back Ashes series. A 3–0 home win secured England the urn for the fourth time in five series. However, in the return series, they found themselves utterly demolished in a 5–0 defeat, their second Ashes whitewash in under a decade. Their misery was compounded by batsman Jonathan Trott leaving the tour early due to a stress-related illness and the mid-series retirement of spinner Graeme Swann. Following the tour, head coach Flower resigned his post while Pietersen was dropped indefinitely from the England team. Flower was replaced by his predecessor, Moores, but he was sacked for a second time after a string of disappointing results including failing to advance from the group stage at the 2015 World Cup.

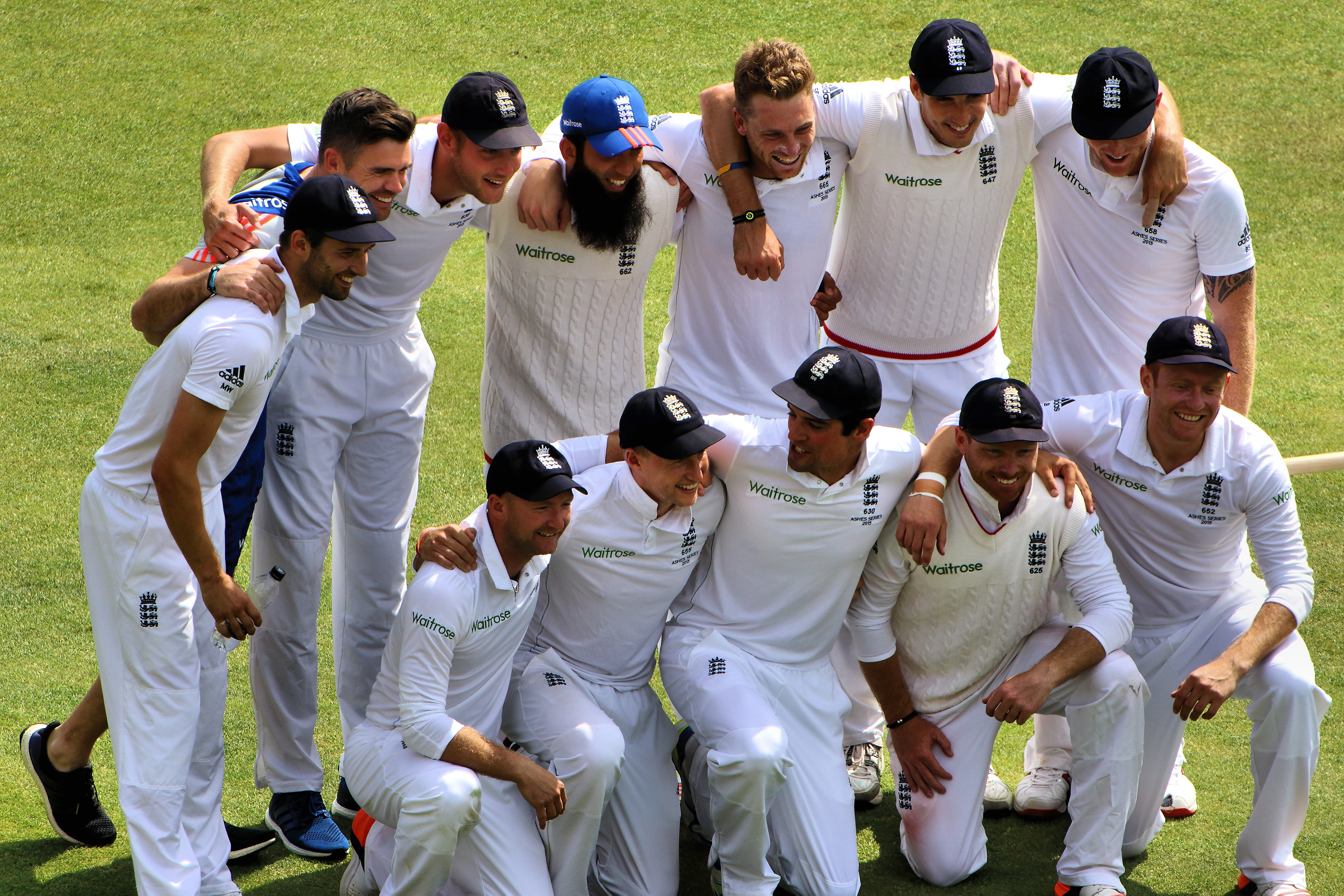
The England team celebrate victory over Australia in the 2015 Ashes series.

Moores was replaced by Australian Trevor Bayliss who oversaw an upturn of form in the ODI team, including series victories against New Zealand and Pakistan. In the Test arena, England reclaimed the Ashes 3–2 in the summer of 2015 before regaining the Basil D'Oliveira Trophy in the 2015–16 winter. However, the upturn in fortune of the ODI and T20I teams coincided with steadily declining form of the Test team, especially with the bat, despite the emergence of key players Joe Root and Ben Stokes. After recording their first ever loss to Bangladesh in a Test, a 4–0 loss to India on the same tour resulted in the resignation of Cook as captain in early 2017, being replaced by Root, who was unable to reverse the decline in the fortunes of the team: in his first year as captain, the team suffered another away Ashes drubbing followed by a loss to New Zealand, embarrassingly dismissed for just 58 in the first test, although the team did recover to beat India 4–1 in 2018.

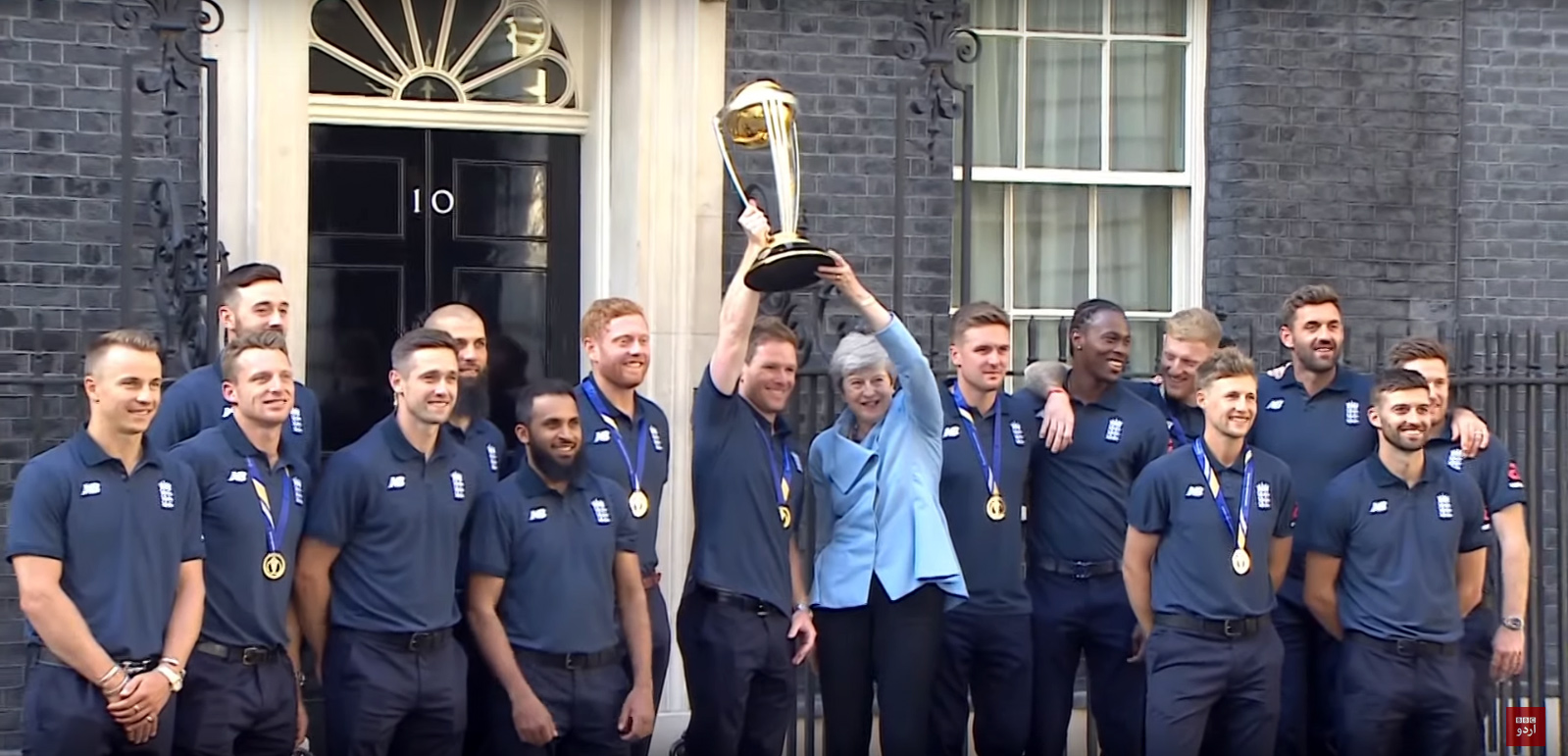
The England team celebrating their 2019 Cricket World Cup success at 10 Downing Street with Theresa May

England entered the 2019 Cricket World Cup as favourites, having been ranked the number one ODI team by the ICC for over a year prior to the tournament. However, shock defeats to Pakistan and Sri Lanka during the group stage left them on the brink of elimination and needing to win their final two games against India and New Zealand to guarantee progression to the semi-finals. This was achieved, putting their campaign back on track, and an eight-wicket victory over Australia in the semi-final at Edgbaston meant England were in their first World Cup final since 1992. The final against New Zealand at Lord's has been described as one of the greatest and most dramatic matches in the history of cricket, with some calling it the "greatest ODI in history", as both the match and subsequent Super Over were tied, after England went into the final over of their innings 14 runs behind New Zealand's total. England won by virtue of having scored more boundaries throughout the match, securing their maiden World Cup title in their fourth final appearance.

That summer's Ashes was the last series with Bayliss as coach and the series was full of moments including the emergence of Rory Burns and Jofra Archer, but it was Stokes's virtuosic effort in the third Test at Headingley which entered cricketing folklore: with only one wicket remaining and 76 more runs still to win, Stokes hit an unbeaten 135 to keep the series alive. England eventually drew the series 2–2.

=== 2020s ===
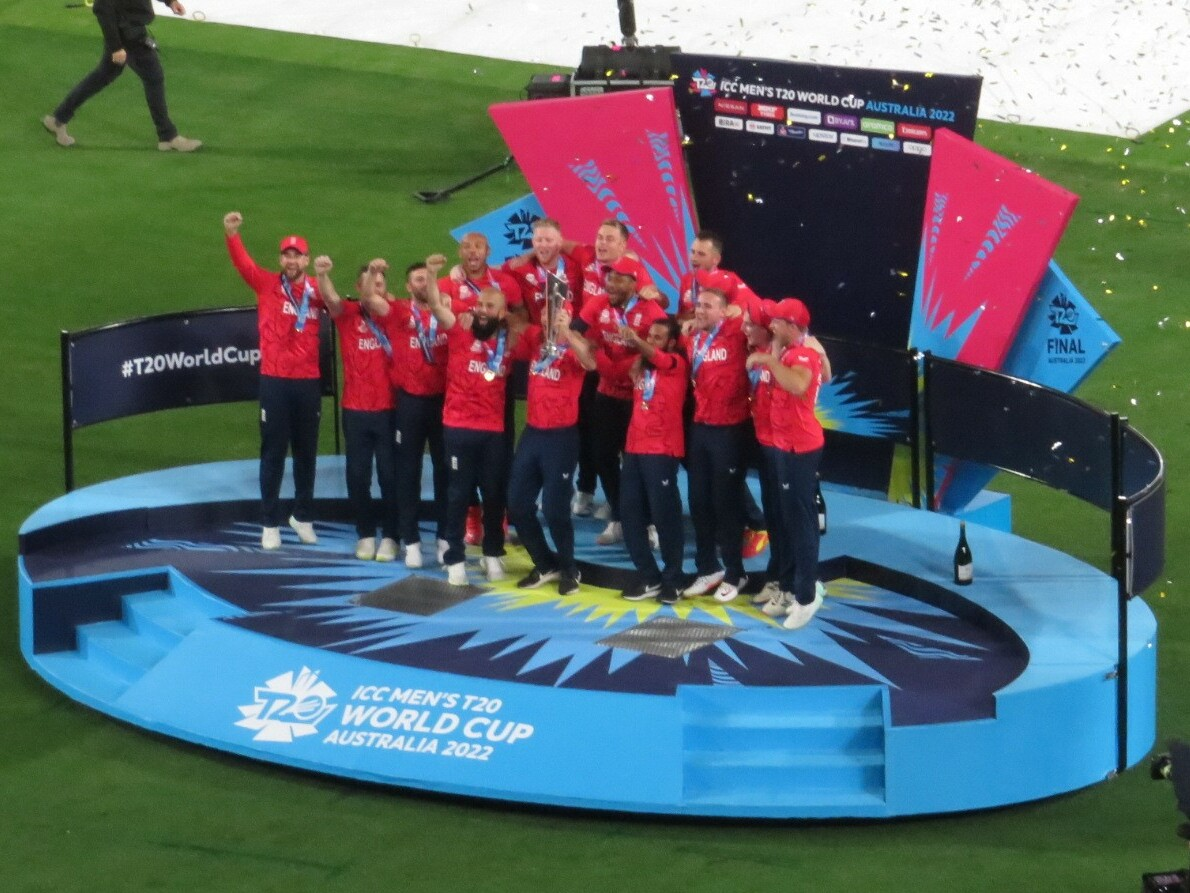
England players celebrating their victory with the 2022 ICC Men's T20 World Cup trophy

Under new coach Chris Silverwood, England began the new decade well when they beat South Africa 3–1 away from home in early 2020, the first time that the England cricket team had won three Tests on a tour to South Africa since 1913–14. The impact of the COVID-19 pandemic was immediately felt when England were withdrawn from their tour of Sri Lanka whilst being on the field, England were able to fulfil all of their fixture obligations during this time, but the summer of 2021 would be marred by COVID interruptions: England were forced to select a second-choice XI for the ODI series against Pakistan due to a COVID-19 outbreak, and the deciding test of the 2021 Pataudi Trophy was postponed for 12 months due to a COVID-19 outbreak in the Indian camp.

After being beaten in the semi finals of the 2021 ICC Men's T20 World Cup, the 2021–22 Ashes series could not have started worse for England when Rory Burns was bowled by Mitchell Starc on the first ball of the series. Four heavy defeats led to Silverwood's resignation as coach and Ashley Giles's resignation as director of cricket. England then toured the West Indies and dropped several senior players, including Burns and Dawid Malan but also their leading fast bowlers, James Anderson and Stuart Broad. That decision backfired when England could not bowl out the West Indies in the first two tests and following a loss in the deciding test, Root resigned as captain after winning just one test in his last 17.

2022 saw a period of transition in both Test and white-ball teams; under a new management structure of Rob Key as director of cricket, England hired Ben Stokes as captain and Brendon McCullum as coach of the Test team and their attacking play became known as Bazball, winning 11 of their first 13 tests, beating New Zealand, India, South Africa, Pakistan, and Ireland. The white-ball team hired Matthew Mott as coach and set the highest total in List A cricket when they scored 498–4 against The Netherlands in June. Jos Buttler succeeded Eoin Morgan as white-ball captain and won the 2022 ICC Men's T20 World Cup, becoming the first team to hold both the 50-over and 20-over trophies concurrently. The following year saw England draw the 2023 Ashes series and crash out of the 2023 Cricket World Cup in the group stage.

Although England reached the semi finals of the 2024 ICC Men's T20 World Cup, they only beat one full member nation in doing so, and Mott resigned as white ball coach accordingly, with McCullum taking on both roles. After losing all their matches at the 2025 ICC Champions Trophy, Buttler also resigned as white ball captain and was succeeded by Harry Brook. The Test team drew the inaugural Anderson–Tendulkar Trophy 2–2 before travelling to Australia for "the biggest series of our lives" according to McCullum: after losing the 2025–26 Ashes series 4–1 and losing the 2026 Crowe–Thorpe Trophy 2–1, McCullum was sacked as Test coach and Stokes retired from international cricket.

=== Recent results ===
	Home			Away		
	Test	One Day International	Twenty20 International	Test	One Day International	Twenty20 International
Last match won	1st Test v New Zealand 2026	3rd ODI v India 2026	5th T20I v India 2026	4th Test v Australia 2025	3rd ODI v Sri Lanka 2026	Super 8 v New Zealand 2026
Last match lost	3rd Test v New Zealand 2026	1st ODI v India 2026	1st T20I v South Africa 2025	5th Test v Australia 2026	2nd ODI v Sri Lanka 2026	Semi-final 2 v India 2026
Last series won	Sri Lanka 2024	India 2026	India 2026	New Zealand 2024–25	Sri Lanka 2025–26	New Zealand 2025–26
Last series lost	New Zealand 2026	South Africa 2025	South Africa 2022	Australia 2025-26	New Zealand 2025–26	2026 World Cup
—N/a	Source: ESPNcricinfo.com. Last updated: 13 July 2026.	Source: ESPNcricinfo.com. Last updated: 14 July 2026.	Source: ESPNcricinfo.com. Last updated: 13 July 2026.	Source: ESPNcricinfo.com. Last updated: 1 June 2026.	Source: ESPNcricinfo.com. Last updated: 1 June 2026.	Source: ESPNcricinfo.com. Last updated: 1 June 2026.

== Forthcoming fixtures ==
As set out by the ICC's Future Tours Programme, below is England's international fixture list until the Autumn of 2026.

Summer 2026

- July : Indian cricket team in England in 2026 for three ODIs and five T20Is
- August to September : Pakistani cricket team in England in 2026 for three Tests
- September : Sri Lankan cricket team in England in 2026 for three ODIs and three T20Is

== Governing body ==
The England and Wales Cricket Board (ECB) is the governing body of English and Welsh cricket and the England cricket team. The Board has been operating since 1 January 1997 and represents England on the International Cricket Council. The ECB is also responsible for the generation of income from the sale of tickets, sponsorship and broadcasting rights, primarily in relation to the England team. The ECB's income in the 2006 calendar year was £77 million.

Prior to 1997, the Test and County Cricket Board (TCCB) was the governing body for the English team. Apart from in Test matches, when touring abroad, the England team officially played as MCC up to and including the 1976–77 tour of Australia, reflecting the time when MCC had been responsible for selecting the touring party. The last time the England touring team wore the bacon-and-egg colours of the MCC was on the 1996–97 tour of New Zealand.

=== Status of Wales ===
Historically, the England team represented the whole of Great Britain in international cricket, with Scottish or Welsh national teams playing sporadically and players from both countries occasionally representing England. Scotland became an independent member of the ICC in 1994, having severed links with the TCCB two years earlier.

Criticism has been made of the England and Wales Cricket Board using only the England name while utilising Welsh players such as Simon and Geraint Jones. With Welsh players pursuing international careers exclusively with an England team, there have been a number of calls for Wales to become an independent member of the ICC, or for the ECB to provide more fixtures for a Welsh national team. However, both Cricket Wales and Glamorgan County Cricket Club have continually supported the ECB, with Glamorgan arguing for the financial benefits of the Welsh county within the English and Welsh structure, and Cricket Wales stating they are "committed to continuing to play a major role within the ECB"

The absence of a Welsh cricket team has seen a number of debates within the Welsh Senedd. In 2013 a debate saw both Conservative and Labour members lend their support to the establishment of an independent Welsh team.

In 2015, a report produced by the Welsh National Assembly's petitions committee, reflected the passionate debate around the issue. Bethan Jenkins, Plaid Cymru's spokesperson on heritage, culture, sport and broadcasting, and a member of the petitions committee, argued that Wales should have its own international team and withdraw from the ECB. Jenkins noted that Ireland (with a population of 6.4 million) was an ICC member with 6,000 club players whereas Wales (with 3 million) had 7,500. Jenkins said: "Cricket Wales and Glamorgan CCC say the idea of a Welsh national cricket team is 'an emotive subject', of course having a national team is emotive, you only have to look at the stands during any national game to see that. To suggest this as anything other than natural is a bit of a misleading argument."

In 2017, the First Minister of Wales, Carwyn Jones called for the reintroduction of the Welsh one-day team stating: "[It] is odd that we see Ireland and Scotland playing in international tournaments and not Wales."

== International grounds ==
Locations of current international cricket grounds in England and Wales

Listed chronologically in order of first match and include neutral fixtures such as World Cup and Champions Trophy games

Venue	City	County team	Capacity	Years used	Test	ODI	T20I
Current venues
The Oval	London	Surrey	26,000	1880–	108	77	17
Old Trafford	Manchester	Lancashire	26,000	1884–	86	55	13
Lord's	London	Middlesex	28,000	1884–	149	71	10
Trent Bridge	Nottingham	Nottinghamshire	17,500	1899–	67	51	14
Headingley	Leeds	Yorkshire	17,500	1899–	82	48	1
Edgbaston	Birmingham	Warwickshire	25,000	1902–	57	65	8
Riverside Ground	Chester-le-Street	Durham	19,000	1999–	6	22	5
Sophia Gardens	Cardiff	Glamorgan	15,500	1999–	3	31	11
Rose Bowl	Southampton	Hampshire	25,000	2003–	7	33	13
County Ground	Taunton	Somerset	12,500	1983–2019	–	6	1
County Ground	Bristol	Gloucestershire	17,500	1983–	–	21	7
Former venues
Bramall Lane	Sheffield	Yorkshire	32,000	1902	1	–	—
St. Helen's	Swansea	Glamorgan	4,500	1973–1983	–	2	—
North Marine Road Ground	Scarborough	Yorkshire	11,500	1976–1978	–	2	—
Grace Road	Leicester	Leicestershire	12,000	1983–1999	–	3	—
New Road	Worcester	Worcestershire	5,500	1983–1999	–	3	—
County Ground	Southampton	Hampshire	7,000	1983–1999	–	3	—
County Ground	Derby	Derbyshire	9,500	1983–1999	–	2	—
Nevill Ground	Tunbridge Wells	Kent	6,000	1983	–	1	—
County Ground	Chelmsford	Essex	6,500	1983–1999	–	3	—
St Lawrence Ground	Canterbury	Kent	15,000	1999–2005	–	4	—
County Ground	Northampton	Northamptonshire	6,500	1999	–	2	—
As of 31 September 2025

== Current squad ==
This lists all the active players who are contracted to or have played for England in the past year (since 18 November 2025) and the forms in which they have played, and any players (in italics) outside this criterion who have been selected in the team's most recent Test, ODI or T20I squad.

The ECB offers a number of contracts in October each year to England players which covers both red-ball and white-ball players, considers the likelihood of players featuring in England teams across formats over the next period while recognising performances in the preceding year. Multi-year contracts have been awarded since 2023.

In addition, Ben Stokes and Mark Wood have appeared in Tests during this period but have since retired from international cricket.

Key

- S/N = Shirt number
- Con = Contract type (Central / Development)

Name	Age	Batting style	Bowling style	Domestic team	Con	Forms	S/N	Captaincy	Last Test	Last ODI	Last T20I
Batters
Tom Banton	28	Right-handed	Right-arm off break	Somerset	C	ODI, T20I	98		–	(Australia) 2026	(Australia) 2026
Harry Brook	27	Right-handed	Right-arm medium	Yorkshire	C	Test, ODI, T20I	88	ODI, T20I (C), Test (VC)	(Pakistan) 2026	(Australia) 2026	(Australia) 2026
Jordan Cox	26	Right-handed	–	Essex	C	Test, ODI, T20I	93		(Pakistan) 2026	(Australia) 2026	(Australia) 2026
Zak Crawley	28	Right-handed	–	Kent	–	Test, ODI	6		(Australia) 2026	(Sri Lanka) 2026	–
Aneurin Donald	29	Right-handed	Right-arm off break	Derbyshire	–	T20I	36		–	–	(Australia) 2026
Ben Duckett	32	Left-handed	–	Nottinghamshire	C	Test, ODI, T20I	17		(Pakistan) 2026	(Australia) 2026	(Sri Lanka) 2026
Emilio Gay	26	Left-handed	–	Durham	C	Test	52		(Pakistan) 2026	–	–
Dan Lawrence	29	Right-handed	Right-arm off break	Surrey	C	Test	28		(Pakistan) 2026	–	–
Ben McKinney	22	Left-handed	Right-arm off-spin	Durham	D	Test	40		–	–	–
Ollie Pope	28	Right-handed	–	Surrey	C	Test	80		(Australia) 2025	–	–
Joe Root	35	Right-handed	Right-arm off break	Yorkshire	C	Test, ODI	66	Test (C)	(Pakistan) 2026	(Australia) 2026	(Pakistan) 2019
All-rounders
Rehan Ahmed	22	Right-handed	Right-arm leg spin	Leicestershire	C	ODI, T20I	53		(Pakistan) 2024	(Sri Lanka) 2026	(India) 2026
Jacob Bethell	23	Left-handed	Slow left-arm orthodox	Warwickshire	C	Test, ODI, T20I	82		(New Zealand) 2026	(India) 2026	(India) 2026
James Coles	22	Right-handed	Left-arm orthodox	Sussex	D	ODI, T20I	84		–	–	–
Sam Curran	28	Left-handed	Left-arm medium-fast	Surrey	C	ODI, T20I	58		(India) 2021	(Australia) 2026	(Australia) 2026
Liam Dawson	36	Right-handed	Slow left-arm orthodox	Hampshire	C	ODI, T20I	83		(India) 2025	(Australia) 2026	(Australia) 2026
Will Jacks	28	Right-handed	Right-arm off break	Surrey	C	Test, ODI, T20I	85		(Australia) 2026	(Australia) 2026	(Australia) 2026
Jamie Overton	32	Right-handed	Right-arm fast	Surrey	C	ODI, T20I	75		(India) 2025	(Australia) 2026	(Australia) 2026
Wicket-keeper-batters
Jos Buttler	36	Right-handed	–	Lancashire	C	ODI, T20I	63		(Australia) 2022	(Sri Lanka) 2026	(Sri Lanka) 2026
James Rew	22	Left-handed	–	Somerset	–	Test	89		(New Zealand) 2026	–	–
Thomas Rew	18	Right-handed	–	Somerset	D	T20I	31		–	–	–
Phil Salt	30	Right-handed	–	Lancashire	C	T20I	61		–	(South Africa) 2025	(Australia) 2026
Jamie Smith	26	Right-handed	–	Surrey	C	Test	39		(Pakistan) 2026	(New Zealand) 2025	(Cricket West Indies) 2025
Pace bowlers
Jofra Archer	31	Right-handed	Right-arm fast	Sussex	C	Test, ODI, T20I	22		(Pakistan) 2026	(Australia) 2026	(India) 2026
Gus Atkinson	28	Right-handed	Right-arm fast-medium	Surrey	C	Test, ODI	37		(Pakistan) 2026	(Australia) 2026	(India) 2025
Sonny Baker	23	Right-handed	Right-arm fast	Hampshire	C	Test, ODI, T20I	60		(New Zealand) 2026	(Australia) 2026	(Sri Lanka) 2026
Brydon Carse	31	Right-handed	Right-arm fast	Durham	C	Test	92		(Australia) 2026	(New Zealand) 2025	(New Zealand) 2025
Sam Cook	29	Right-handed	Right-arm fast-medium	Essex	C	Test	86		(Zimbabwe) 2025	–	–
Henry Crocombe	25	Right-handed	Right-arm fast-medium	Sussex	C	ODI, T20I	54		–	(Sri Lanka) 2026	(Australia) 2026
Matthew Fisher	29	Right-handed	Right-arm fast-medium	Surrey	C	Test	74		(New Zealand) 2026	–	–
Eddie Jack	21	Left-handed	Right-arm fast-medium	Hampshire	D	ODI, T20I	68		–	–	–
Saqib Mahmood	29	Right-handed	Right-arm fast-medium	Lancashire	C	ODI, T20I	25		(Cricket West Indies) 2022	(India) 2026	(India) 2026
Matthew Potts	28	Right-handed	Right-arm fast-medium	Durham	C	Test	35		(Australia) 2026	(Cricket West Indies) 2025	(Cricket West Indies) 2025
Ollie Robinson	32	Right-handed	Right-arm medium-fast	Sussex	C	Test	1		(Pakistan) 2026	–	–
Josh Tongue	29	Right-handed	Right-arm fast-medium	Nottinghamshire	C	Test, ODI, T20I	56		(Pakistan) 2026	(Sri Lanka) 2026	(Sri Lanka) 2026
Luke Wood	31	Left-handed	Left-arm fast-medium	Lancashire	–	T20I	57		–	(New Zealand) 2025	(India) 2026
Spin bowlers
Shoaib Bashir	23	Right-handed	Right-arm off break	Derbyshire	C	Test	67		(New Zealand) 2026	–	–
Liam Patterson-White	28	Left-handed	Left-arm spin	Nottinghamshire	D	Test	70		–	–	–
Adil Rashid	38	Right-handed	Right-arm leg spin	Yorkshire	C	ODI, T20I	95		(Cricket West Indies) 2019	(Pakistan) 2026	(Australia) 2026

== Coaching staff ==
Position	Name
Head coach (Test)	Stephen Fleming
Head coach (Limited-overs)	Brendon McCullum
Test coaches	Marcus Trescothick; Richard Dawson; James Foster; Eric Simons
Limited-overs coaches	Jeetan Patel; Sarah Taylor; Tim Southee; Kevin Pietersen (mentor)
Fast-bowling lead	Troy Cooley
Batting lead	Michael Yardy
Spin-bowling lead	Richard Dawson

== Team colours ==
Period	Kit manufacturer	Shirt sponsor
1994–1996		Tetley Bitter
1996–1998	ASICS	Tetley Bitter
1998–2000	ASICS	Vodafone
2000–2008	Admiral	Vodafone
2008–2010	Adidas	Vodafone
2010–2014	Adidas	Brit Insurance
2014–2017	Adidas	Waitrose
2017–2021	New Balance	NatWest
2021–2022	New Balance	Cinch
2022–2025	Castore	Cinch
2025–present	Castore	Toyota

When playing Test cricket, England's cricket whites feature the three lions badge on the left of the shirt and the name of the sponsor Toyota on the centre. English and Welsh fielders may wear a navy blue cap or white sun hat with the ECB logo in the middle. Helmets are also coloured navy blue. Before 1997 the uniform sported the TCCB lion and stumps logo on the uniforms, while the helmets, jumpers and hats had the three lions emblem. Before 1996, the caps used in test touring squads featured a crest depicting St. George and a dragon. In April 2017, the ECB brought back the traditional cable-knit sweater for test matches.

In One Day Internationals the kit is a blue shirt with navy trousers, whilst the Twenty20 kit is a flame-red shirt and navy trousers. Over the years, England's ODI kit has cycled between various shades of blue (such as a pale blue used until the mid-1990s, when it was replaced in favour of a bright blue) with the occasional all-red kit.

In limited overs cricket, England's shirts feature the Toyota logo across the centre, except in ICC limited-overs tournaments when a modified kit design is used with 'ENGLAND' printed across the front and the sponsor's logo on the sleeve.

== Fan following ==
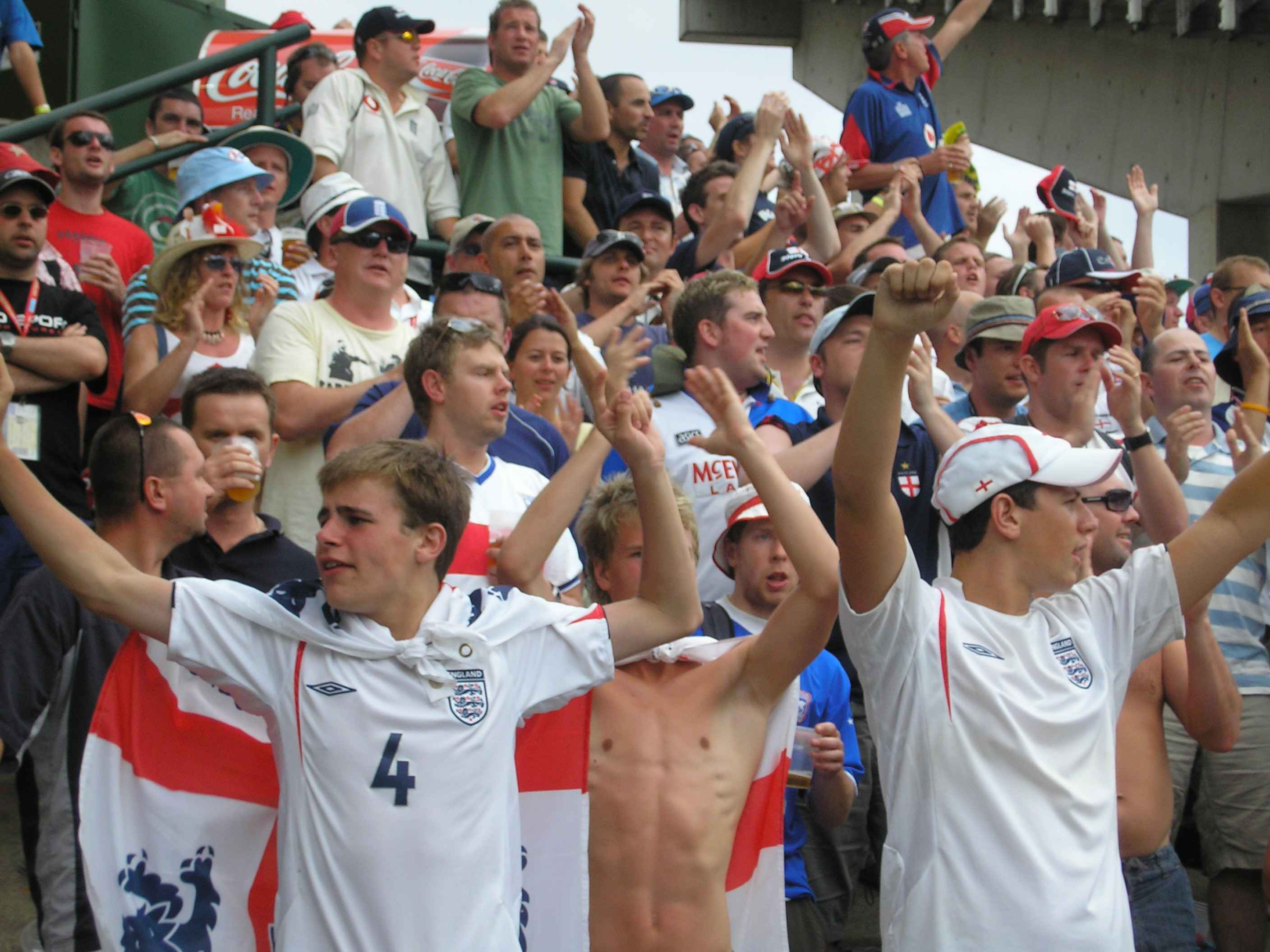
The Barmy Army chanting at the Sydney Cricket Ground

The Barmy Army is a supporters' organisation that provides tickets and arranges touring parties for its members to follow the English cricket team in the UK and overseas. It was at first an informal group but was later turned into a company limited by guarantee, registered in England and Wales. The name is also applied to followers of the team who join in with match day activities in the crowd, but do not necessarily travel as part of an organised tour. Collins dictionary defines the word barmy as "slightly crazy or very foolish".

The group, then less organised, was given its name by the Australian media during the 1994–95 Test series in Australia, reportedly for the fans' hopeless audacity in travelling all the way to Australia in the near-certain knowledge that their team would lose, and the fact that they kept on chanting encouragement to the England team even when England were losing quite badly. It was co-founded by Paul Burnham.

== Tournament history ==
Key
Champions
Runners-up
Third place
Fourth place

Indicates tournaments played within England

=== World Test Championship ===
ICC World Test Championship record
Year	League stage										Final host	Final	Final position
Year	Pos	Matches					Ded	PC	Pts	PCT	Final host	Final	Final position
Year	Pos	P	W	L	D	T	Ded	PC	Pts	PCT	Final host	Final	Final position
2019–21	4/9	21	11	7	3	0	0	720	442	61.4	Rose Bowl, England	DNQ	League Stage
2021–23	4/9	22	10	8	4	0	12	264	124	47	The Oval, England	DNQ	League Stage
2023–25	5/9	22	11	10	1	0	22	264	114	43.2	Lord's, England	DNQ	League Stage
2025–27	7/9	10	3	6	1	0	2	120	38	31.67	Lord's, England	TBD	In progress

=== Cricket World Cup ===
World Cup record
Year	Round	Position	GP	W	L	T	NR	Win %
(England) 1975	Semi-final	3/8	4	3	1	0	0	75.00
(England) 1979	Runners-up	2/8	5	4	1	0	0	80.00
(England) (Wales) 1983	Semi-final	3/8	7	5	2	0	0	71.43
(India) (Pakistan) 1987	Runners-up	2/8	8	5	3	0	0	62.50
(Australia) (New Zealand) 1992	Runners-up	2/9	10	6	3	0	1	66.67
(India) (Pakistan) (Sri Lanka) 1996	Quarter-final	8/12	6	2	4	0	0	33.33
(England) (Wales) (Scotland) (Republic of Ireland) (Netherlands) 1999	Group stage	8/12	5	3	2	0	0	60.00
(South Africa) (Zimbabwe) (Kenya) 2003	Group stage	8/14	6	3	3	0	0	50.00
(Cricket West Indies) 2007	Super 8	5/16	9	5	4	0	0	55.55
(India) (Sri Lanka) (Bangladesh) 2011	Quarter-final	7/14	7	3	3	1	0	50.00
(Australia) (New Zealand) 2015	Group stage	10/14	6	2	4	0	0	33.33
(England) (Wales) 2019	Champions	1/10	11	8	3	0	0	68.18
(India) 2023	Group stage	7/10	9	3	6	0	0	33.33
(South Africa) (Zimbabwe) (Namibia) 2027	TBD							
(India) (Bangladesh) 2031	TBD							
Total	1 title	13/13	93	52	39	1	1	56.45

*The win percentage excludes no results and counts ties as half a win.

=== T20 World Cup ===
T20 World Cup record
Year	Round	Position	GP	W	L	T	NR	Win %
(South Africa) 2007	Super 8	7/12	5	1	4	0	0	20.00
(England) 2009	Super 8	6/12	5	2	3	0	0	40.00
(Cricket West Indies) 2010	Champions	1/12	7	5	1	0	1	83.33
(Sri Lanka) 2012	Super 8	6/12	5	2	3	0	0	40.00
(Bangladesh) 2014	Super 10	7/16	4	1	3	0	0	25.00
(India) 2016	Runners-up	2/16	6	4	2	0	0	66.67
(United Arab Emirates) (Oman) 2021	Semi-final	4/16	6	4	2	0	0	66.67
(Australia) 2022	Champions	1/16	7	5	1	0	1	83.33
(Cricket West Indies) (United States) 2024	Semi-final	4/20	8	4	3	0	1	57.14
(India) (Sri Lanka) 2026	Semi-final	4/20	8	6	2	0	0	75.00
(Australia) (New Zealand) 2028	TBD							
(England) (Wales) (Scotland) (Republic of Ireland) 2030	Qualified as co-hosts							
Total	2 titles	10/10	61	34	24	0	3	59.38

*The win percentage excludes no results and counts ties as half a win.

=== Champions Trophy ===
Champions Trophy record
Year	Round	Position	GP	W	L	T	NR	Win %
(Bangladesh) 1998	Quarter-final	5/9	1	0	1	0	0	0.00
(Kenya) 2000	Quarter-final	7/11	1	0	1	0	0	0.00
(Sri Lanka) 2002	Pool stage	6/12	2	1	1	0	0	50.00
(England) 2004	Runners-up	2/12	4	3	1	0	0	75.00
(India) 2006	Pool stage	7/10	3	1	2	0	0	33.33
(South Africa) 2009	Semi-final	4/8	4	2	2	0	0	50.00
(England) (Wales) 2013	Runners-up	2/8	5	3	2	0	0	60.00
(England) (Wales) 2017	Semi-final	3/8	4	3	1	0	0	75.00
(Pakistan) (United Arab Emirates) 2025	Pool Stage	8/8	3	0	3	0	0	0.00
(India) 2029	TBD							
Total	0 titles	9/9	27	13	14	0	0	48.15

*The win percentage excludes no results and counts ties as half a win.

== Honours ==
=== ICC ===
Titles

- World Cup
  - Champions (1): 2019
  - Runners-up (3): 1979, 1987, 1992
- T20 World Cup
  - Champions (2): 2010, 2022
  - Runners-up (1): 2016
- Champions Trophy
  - Runners-up (2): 2004, 2013

== Records ==
=== Test matches ===
==== Test record versus other nations ====
Opposition	First Test	Matches	Won	Lost	Drawn	Tied	% Won
Australia	15 March 1877	366	113	156	97	0	30.9
Bangladesh	21 October 2003	10	9	1	0	0	90.0
India	25 June 1932	141	53	37	51	0	37.6
Ireland	24 July 2019	2	2	0	0	0	100.0
New Zealand	10 January 1930	118	55	16	47	0	46.6
Pakistan	10 June 1954	95	33	23	39	0	34.7
South Africa	12 March 1889	156	66	35	55	0	42.3
Sri Lanka	17 February 1982	39	19	9	11	0	48.7
West Indies	23 June 1928	166	54	59	53	0	32.5
Zimbabwe	18 December 1996	7	4	0	3	0	57.1
Total		1100	408	336	356	0	37.1
Last updated: 12 September 2026

==== Test team records ====
- Highest team total: 903–7 dec. v. Australia at The Oval in 1938
- Lowest team total: 45 v. Australia at Sydney in 1886/87
- England are the only team in the history of Test cricket to have secured 100 victories by an innings.

==== Test individual records ====
- Most matches: 188 Tests – James Anderson
- Longest-serving captain: 68 Tests – Joe Root

==== Test batting records ====
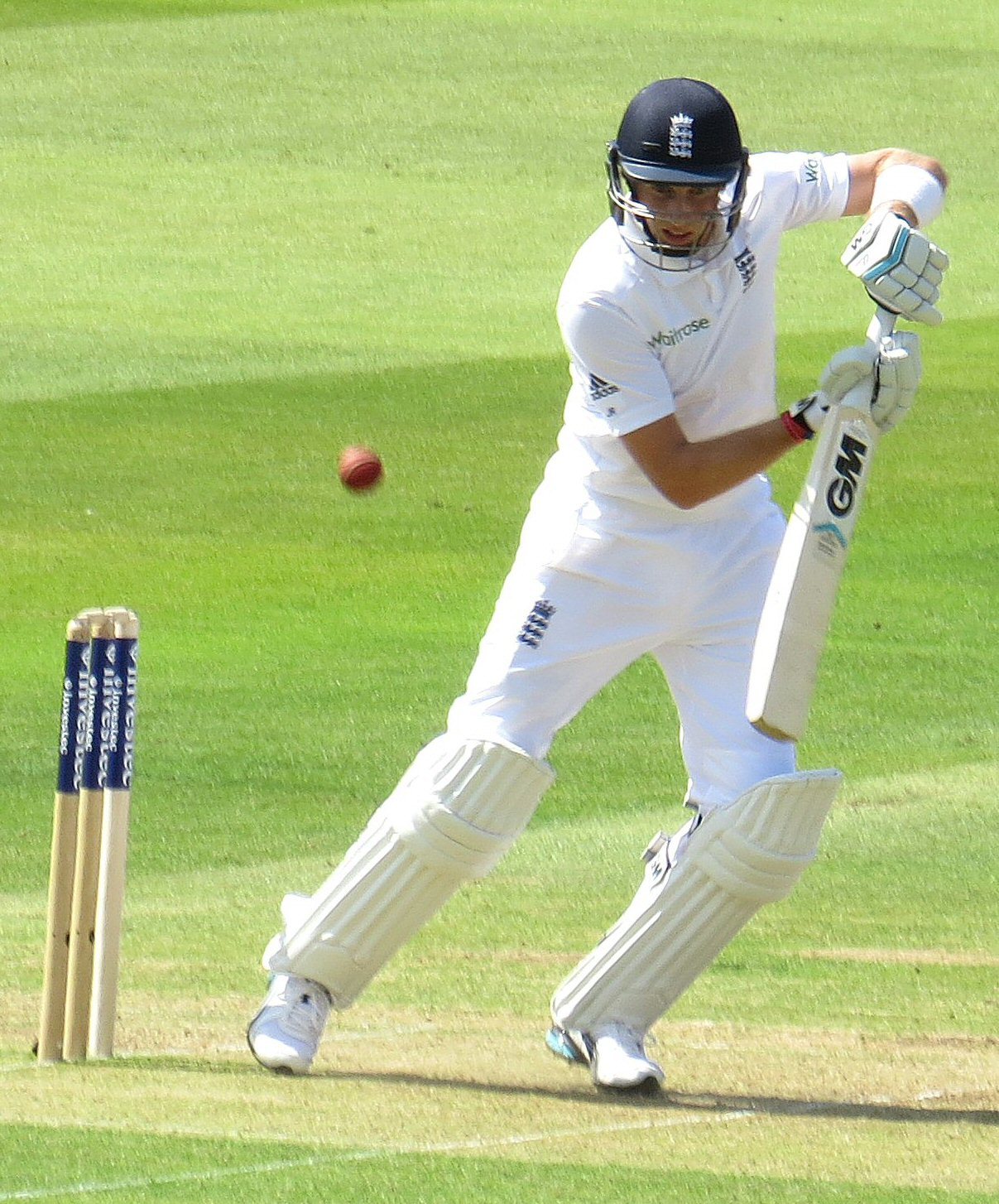
Joe Root, England's all-time leading run scorer in both Tests and ODIs

- Most runs: 14,278 – Joe Root
- Best average: 60.73 – Herbert Sutcliffe
- Highest individual score: 364 – Len Hutton v. Australia at The Oval in 1938
- Record partnership: 454 – Joe Root and Harry Brook v. Pakistan at Multan in 2024
- Most centuries: 41 – Joe Root
- Most double centuries: 7 – Wally Hammond
- Most ducks: 39 – Stuart Broad

==== Test bowling records ====
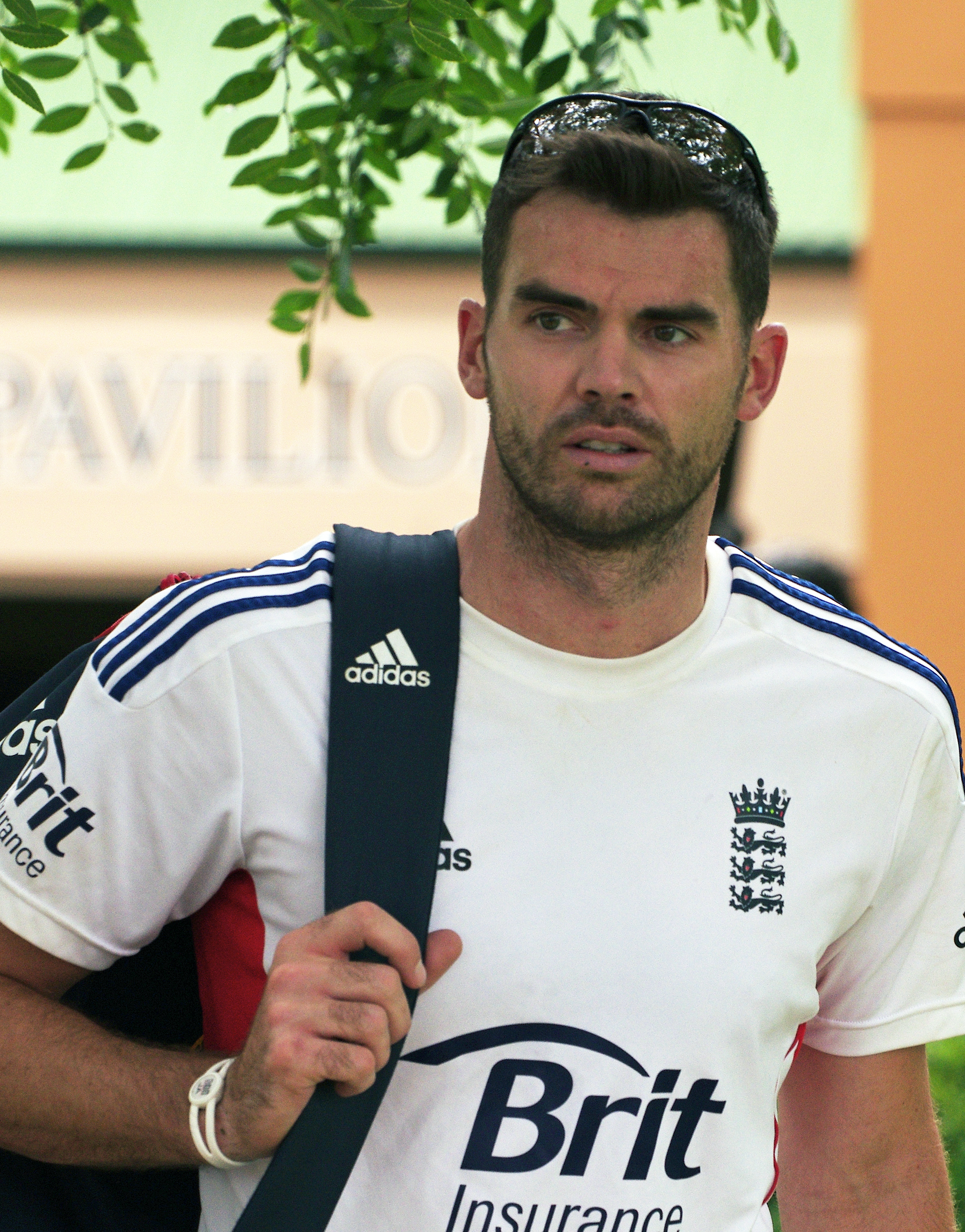
James Anderson, England's all-time leading wicket taker in both Tests and ODIs

- Most wickets: 704 – James Anderson
- Best average: 10.75 – George Lohmann
- Best innings bowling: 10/53 – Jim Laker v. Australia at Old Trafford in 1956
- Best match bowling: 19/90 – Jim Laker v. Australia at Old Trafford in 1956
- Best strike rate: 34.1 – George Lohmann
- Best economy rate: 1.31 – William Attewell
- Five England bowlers have taken four wickets in an over, three of these at Headingley. They were Maurice Allom v. New Zealand at Christchurch in 1929–30, Kenneth Cranston v. South Africa at Headingley in 1947, Fred Titmus v. New Zealand at Headingley in 1965, Chris Old v. Pakistan at Edgbaston in 1978 and Andy Caddick v. West Indies at Headingley in 2000.

==== Test fielding records ====
- Most catches by an outfielder: 218 – Joe Root
- Most dismissals as wicketkeeper: 269 – Alan Knott
- Most dismissals in an innings: 7 – Bob Taylor v. India at Bombay in 1979/80
- Most dismissals in a match: 11 – Jack Russell v. South Africa at Johannesburg in 1995/96

=== One Day Internationals ===
==== ODI record versus other nations ====
Opponent	Matches	Won	Lost	Tied	No Result	% Won	First	Last
Full Members
Afghanistan	4	2	2	0	0	50.0	2015	2025
Australia	165	67	93	2	3	40.6	1971	2026
Bangladesh	25	20	5	0	0	80.0	2000	2023
India	113	46	62	2	3	40.7	1974	2026
Ireland	15	11	2	0	2	73.3	2006	2023
New Zealand	99	44	48	3	4	44.4	1973	2025
Pakistan	94	57	34	0	3	60.6	1974	2026
South Africa	74	31	36	1	5	41.9	1992	2025
Sri Lanka	87	43	40	1	3	49.4	1982	2026
West Indies	111	57	48	0	6	51.4	1973	2025
Zimbabwe	30	21	8	0	1	70.0	1992	2004
Associate Members
Canada	2	2	0	0	0	100.0	1979	2007
East Africa	1	1	0	0	0	100.0	1975	1975
Kenya	2	2	0	0	0	100.0	1999	2007
Namibia	1	1	0	0	0	100.0	2003	2003
Netherlands	7	7	0	0	0	100.0	1996	2023
Scotland	5	3	1	0	1	60.0	2008	2018
United Arab Emirates	1	1	0	0	0	100.0	1996	1996
Total	836	416	380	9	31	49.8	1971	2026
Statistics are correct as of 18 November 2026.

==== ODI team records ====
- Highest team total: 498/4 (50 overs) v. Netherlands at VRA Cricket Ground in 2022
- Lowest team total: 86 (32.4 overs) v. Australia at Old Trafford in 2001

==== ODI individual records ====
- Most matches: 225 – Eoin Morgan
- Longest-serving captain: 126 matches – Eoin Morgan

==== ODI batting records ====
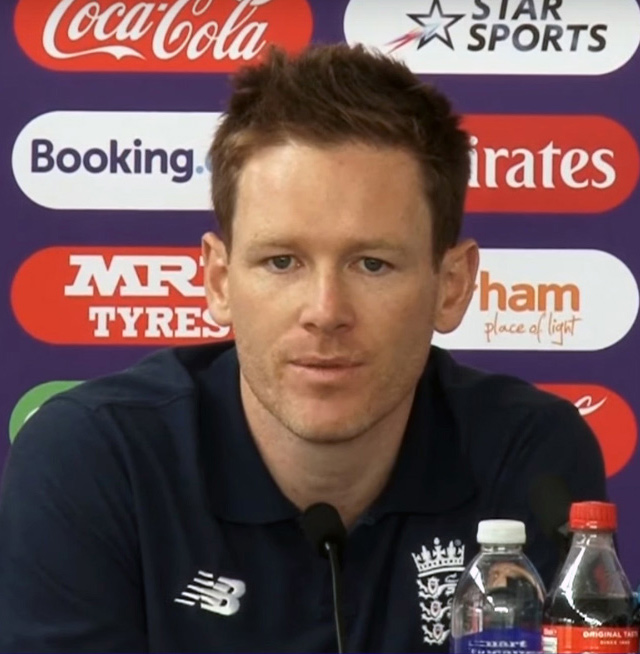
Eoin Morgan, England's most-capped player in ODIs

- Most runs: 8,101 – Joe Root
- Best average: 55.8 – Dawid Malan
- Best strike rate: 115.5 – Jos Buttler
- Highest individual score: 202 – Harry Brook v. Sri Lanka at Rawalpindi in 2026
- Record partnership: 256* – Alex Hales and Jason Roy v. Sri Lanka at Edgbaston in 2016
- Most centuries: 20 – Joe Root
- Most ducks: 15 – Eoin Morgan & Jos Buttler

==== ODI bowling records ====
- Most wickets: 269 – James Anderson
- Best average: 23.61 – Andrew Flintoff
- Best bowling: 6/24 – Reece Topley v. India at Lord's in 2005
- Best strike rate: 29.6 – Reece Topley
- Best economy rate: 3.28 – Bob Willis

==== ODI fielding records ====
- Most catches by an outfielder: 108 – Paul Collingwood
- Most dismissals as wicketkeeper: 277 – Jos Buttler
- Most dismissals in a match: 6 – Alec Stewart v. Zimbabwe at Old Trafford in 2000; Matt Prior v. South Africa at Trent Bridge in 2008; Jos Buttler v. South Africa at The Oval in 2013

=== T20 Internationals ===
==== T20I record versus other nations ====
Opponent	Matches	Won	Lost	Tied	No Result	% Won
Afghanistan	3	3	0	0	0	100.0
Australia	27	12	13	0	2	44.4
Bangladesh	4	1	3	0	0	25.0
India	35	16	18	0	1	45.7
Ireland	4	2	1	0	1	50.0
Italy	1	1	0	0	0	100.0
Namibia	1	1	0	0	0	100.0
Nepal	1	1	0	0	0	100.0
Netherlands	2	0	2	0	0	0.0
New Zealand	31	17	10	1	3	54.8
Oman	1	1	0	0	0	100.0
Pakistan	32	21	9	1	1	65.6
Scotland	2	1	0	0	1	50.0
South Africa	28	13	14	0	1	46.4
Sri Lanka	21	17	4	0	0	81.0
United States	1	1	0	0	0	100.0
West Indies	39	19	19	0	1	48.7
Zimbabwe	1	1	0	0	0	100.0
Total	234	128	93	2	11	54.7
Statistics are correct as of 21 November 2026.

==== T20I team records ====
- Highest team total: 304/2 v. South Africa at Old Trafford in 2025
- Lowest team total: 80 v. India at Colombo (RPS) in 2012

==== T20I individual records ====
- Most matches: 163 – Jos Buttler
- Longest-serving captain: 72 matches – Eoin Morgan

==== T20I batting records ====
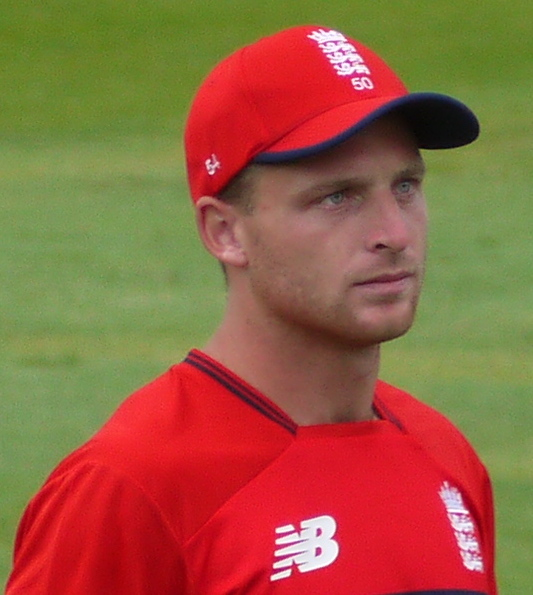
Jos Buttler, England's all-time leading run scorer in T20Is

- Most runs: 4,384 – Jos Buttler
- Best average: 37.9 – Kevin Pietersen
- Best strike rate: 164.9.7 – Harry Brook
- Highest individual score: 141* – Phil Salt v. West Indies at Tarouba in 2023
- Record partnership: 233 – Jos Buttler and Harry Brook v. India at Rose Bowl, Southampton in 2026
- Most centuries: 4 – Phil Salt
- Most ducks: 11 – Jos Buttler

==== T20I bowling records ====
- Most wickets: 171 – Adil Rashid
- Best average: 16.8 – Graeme Swann
- Best bowling: 5/10 – Sam Curran v. Afghanistan at Perth in 2022
- Best strike rate: 13.3 – Jamie Overton
- Best economy rate: 6.4 – Graeme Swann

==== T20I fielding records ====
- Most catches by an outfielder: 48 – Chris Jordan
- Most dismissals as wicket-keeper: 112 – Jos Buttler (Note: Some sources list Butler with 113 dismissals as keeper)
- Most dismissals in an innings: 5 – Jos Buttler v. India at Trent Bridge in 2026

=== Most England appearances ===
These lists show the five players (or those tied for fifth) with the most appearances for England in each form of the game. The lists are correct up to match starting on 18 November 2026.

- † = players who are available for selection and have represented England in the format during the past 12 months.

Most Test caps
188	James Anderson
169	Joe Root †
167	Stuart Broad
161	Alastair Cook
133	Alec Stewart

Most ODI caps
225	Eoin Morgan
204	Jos Buttler †
202	Joe Root †
197	Paul Collingwood
194	James Anderson

Most T20I caps
163	Jos Buttler †
153	Adil Rashid †
115	Eoin Morgan
95	Chris Jordan
92	Moeen Ali

== Eligibility of players ==
The England cricket team represents England and Wales. However, under ICC regulations, players can qualify to play for a country by nationality, place of birth or residence, so (as with any national sports team) some people are eligible to play for more than one team. ECB regulations state that to play for England, a player must be a British citizen, and have either been born in England or Wales, or have lived in England or Wales for three years. This has led to players who also held other nationalities becoming eligible to play for England. The qualification period for those born outside England and Wales has varied in the past, but in November 2018 the ECB announced that the period would be reduced to three years in all circumstances, in line with ICC regulations.

Of the current squad (see above), Brydon Carse was born in South Africa so had to fulfil residency requirements; Jofra Archer, though born in Barbados to a Barbadian mother, qualifies through his English father; and Jacob Bethell was also born in Barbados and moved to England as a teenager to attend Rugby School.

ICC regulations also allow cricketers who represent associate (i.e. non-Test-playing) nations to switch to a Test-playing nation, provided nationality requirements are fulfilled. In recent years, this has seen Irish internationals Ed Joyce, Boyd Rankin and Eoin Morgan switch to represent England (before Ireland were promoted to full member status in 2018), whilst Gavin Hamilton previously played for Scotland – though Joyce, Rankin and Hamilton were later able to re-qualify for and represent the countries of their birth.

== See also ==
- List of England cricket captains
- List of England cricket team coaches
- List of England Test cricketers
- List of England ODI cricketers
- List of England Twenty20 International cricketers

== Notes ==
Preceded by None	Test match playing teams 15 March 1877 (Jointly with Australia)	Succeeded by South Africa
