= Sonny Baker =

English cricketer (born 2003)

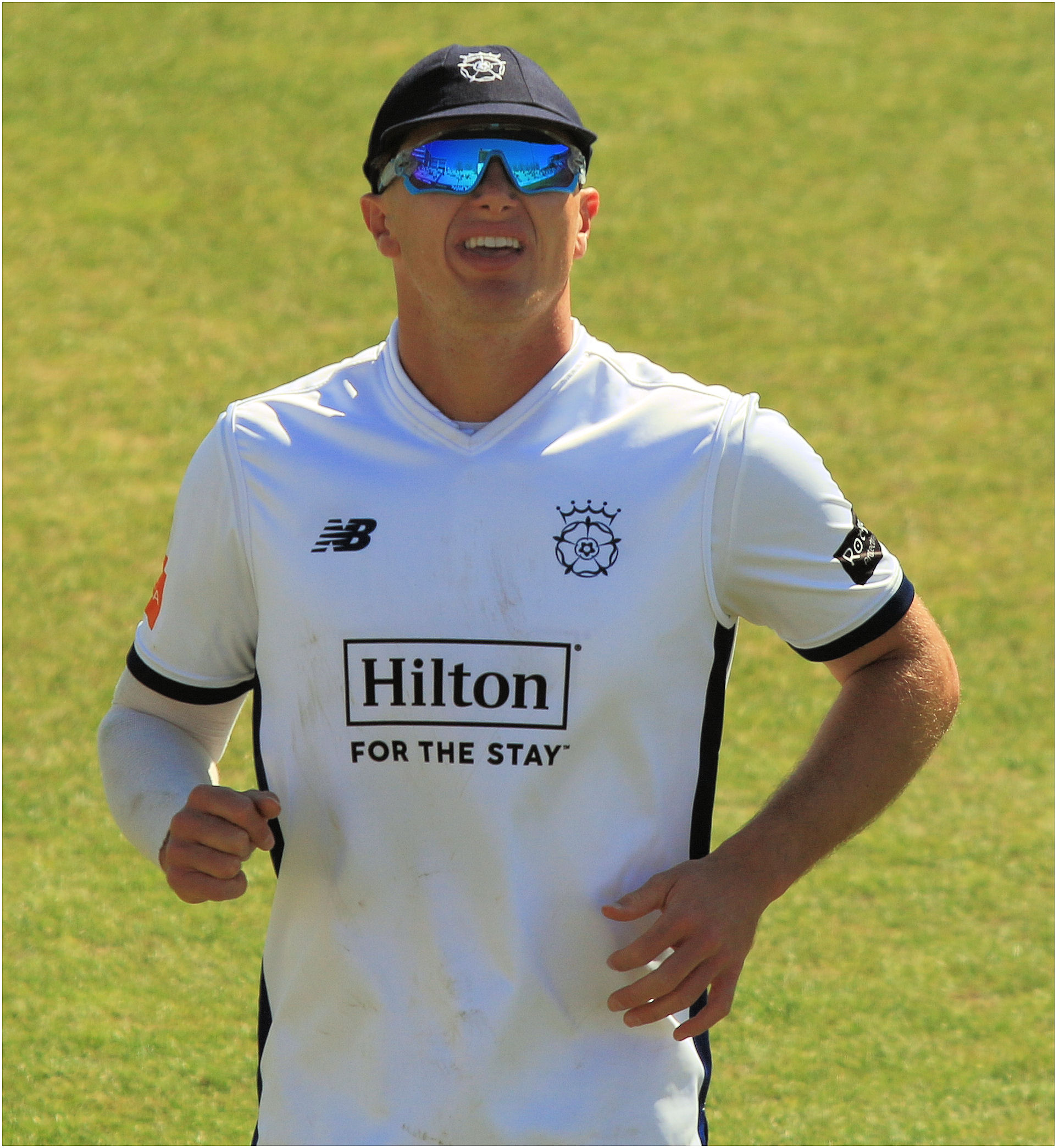
- Baker in 2025

Personal information
- Born: 13 March 2003 (age 23); Torbay, Devon, England
- Batting: Right-handed
- Bowling: Right-arm fast
- Role: Bowler
- Relatives: Andrew Hele (uncle)

International information
- National side: England (2025–present)
- Only Test (cap 721): 17 June 2026 v New Zealand
- ODI debut (cap 280): 2 September 2025 v South Africa
- Last ODI: 18 November 2026 v Australia
- T20I debut (cap 109): 21 September 2025 v Ireland
- Last T20I: 19 September 2026 v Sri Lanka

Domestic team information
- Years: Team
- 2021–2024: Somerset (squad no. 16)
- 2021: Trent Rockets
- 2022: Southern Brave
- 2024–2026: Manchester Super Giants
- 2024/25–present: Hampshire (squad no. 95)

Career statistics
Competition	Test	ODI	T20I	FC
Matches	1	6	4	16
Runs scored	4	1	–	69
Batting average	4.00	1.00	–	4.31
100s/50s	0/0	0/0	–/–	0/0
Top score	4	1*	–	27
Balls bowled	205	282	95	2,468
Wickets	3	11	6	54
Bowling average	53.66	30.27	16.00	29.83
5 wickets in innings	0	0	0	4
10 wickets in match	0	0	0	0
Best bowling	2/94	4/45	3/12	5/45
Catches/stumpings	0/–	2/–	0/–	7/–
- Source: Cricinfo, 18 November 2026

Sonny Baker (born 13 March 2003) is an English cricketer. He made his List A debut on 25 July 2021, for Somerset in the 2021 One-Day Cup.

== Early life ==
From Torquay in Devon, Baker attended Torquay Boys' Grammar School before switching to King's College, Taunton, where former Somerset and Devon batsman Robert Woodman is the director of cricket. He signed a contract with the Somerset Academy in 2020.

== Domestic career ==
Following the 2021 One-Day Cup campaign, Baker signed a two-year professional contract with Somerset. On 13 August 2021, Baker was called up to The Hundred to play for the Trent Rockets as a replacement player.

In December 2021, he was named in England's team for the 2022 ICC Under-19 Cricket World Cup in the West Indies. However, in January 2022, Baker was ruled out of England's squad due to a back injury. He made his Twenty20 debut on 22 August 2022, for Southern Brave in the 2022 season of The Hundred. Baker was selected as a wildcard player for Manchester Originals in the 2024 season of The Hundred, but was subsequently ruled out of the competition.

In August 2024, Baker confirmed that he would be leaving Somerset at the end of the season to sign for Hampshire ahead of the 2025 season. In May 2026, he agreed a contract extension with Hampshire, tying him into the club until at least the end of the 2028 season.

Baker was voted as the Professional Cricketers' Association 2026 Men's Young Player of the Year.

== International career ==
Baker was included in the England Lions squad to tour Australia in January 2025. He was awarded an England development contract the following month. He made his ODI debut for England against South Africa on 2 September 2025, but struggled, bowling seven overs for 76 runs, without taking a wicket. He made his T20 debut later that month against Ireland, but again performed poorly, recording figures of 0-52 from four overs. Baker was announced to be part of England's 12-man squad to face New Zealand in the first Test of the 2026 British summer, with coach McCullum hinting at his express pace, as well as the weather, as the reasons for his selection.

On 17 June 2026, Baker made his England Test debut, taking to the field in the second match of the series against New Zealand at The Oval.
