= Luke Wood (cricketer) =

English cricketer (born 1995)

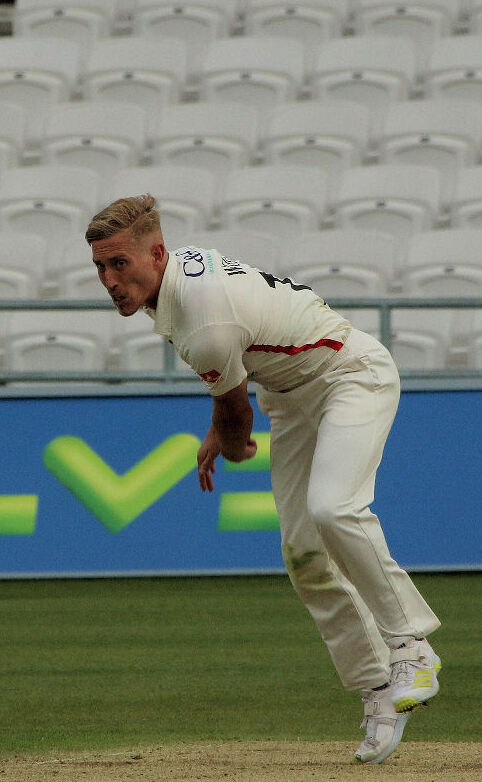
- Wood in 2022

Personal information
- Born: 2 August 1995 (age 31); Sheffield, South Yorkshire, England
- Batting: Left-handed
- Bowling: Left-arm fast-medium
- Role: Bowler

International information
- National side: England (2022-present)
- ODI debut (cap 266): 17 November 2022 v Australia
- Last ODI: 26 October 2025 v New Zealand
- T20I debut (cap 96): 20 September 2022 v Pakistan
- Last T20I: 1 July 2026 v India

Domestic team information
- Years: Team
- 2014–2019: Nottinghamshire
- 2018: Worcestershire
- 2019: Northamptonshire
- 2020–present: Lancashire
- 2021–2024: Trent Rockets
- 2022/23: Melbourne Stars
- 2023: Sylhet Strikers
- 2024–present: Peshawar Zalmi
- 2024: Khulna Tigers
- 2024: Mumbai Indians
- 2025: London Spirit
- 2026: Gujarat Titans
- 2025/26: Adelaide Strikers
- 2026: Southern Brave

Career statistics
Competition	ODI	T20I	FC	LA
Matches	3	17	62	7
Runs scored	15	4	1,884	88
Batting average	15.00	4.00	25.45	44.00
100s/50s	0/0	0/0	2/7	0/1
Top score	10	3	119	52
Balls bowled	108	306	8,391	234
Wickets	1	19	137	6
Bowling average	113.00	24.31	35.40	39.66
5 wickets in innings	0	0	3	0
10 wickets in match	0	0	0	0
Best bowling	1/54	3/24	5/40	2/36
Catches/stumpings	0/–	7/–	19/–	0/–
Medal record
Men's Cricket
Representing England
ICC Men's T20 World Cup
Winner	2022 Australia
- Source: ESPNcricinfo, 1 July 2026

Luke Wood (born 2 August 1995) is an English cricketer who plays for England and Lancashire. Primarily a left-arm fast-medium bowler, he also bats left-handed. He made his first-class debut for Nottinghamshire against Sussex in September 2014. He made his international debut in 2022

In April 2022, he was bought by the Trent Rockets for the 2022 season of The Hundred. The following month, Wood was named in England's One Day International (ODI) squad for their series against the Netherlands. In September 2022, he was named in the England's T20I squad for the series against Pakistan. He made his T20I debut on 20 September 2022, against Pakistan. Wood made his ODI debut on 17 November 2022, against Australia.

In the BPL 2022–23, he was taken by Sylhet Strikers franchise. He played a crucial part in the Qualifier 2 conceding just 3 runs in the penultimate over helping Sylhet reach the final of BPL 2023.

On 18 March 2024, he was signed as a replacement for the injured Jason Behrendorff by Mumbai Indians for ₹50 lakh (£40,000).

On 21 March 2025, it was announced that Wood had been signed by ECB, Lincolnshire Premier League side Woodhall Spa Cricket Club, when not on white-ball duty.
