= Jamie Overton =

English cricketer (born 1994)

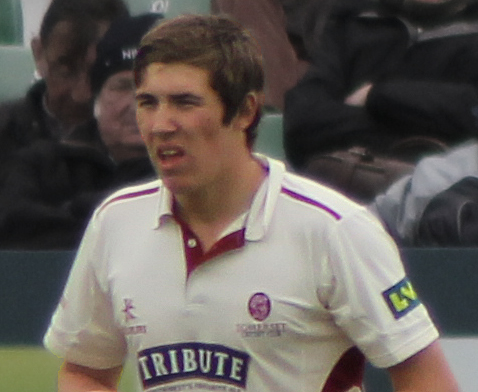

Personal information
- Born: 10 April 1994 (age 32); Barnstaple, Devon, England
- Height: 6 ft 5 in (1.96 m)
- Batting: Right-handed
- Bowling: Right-arm fast
- Role: Bowling all-rounder
- Relatives: Craig Overton (twin brother)

International information
- National side: England (2022–present)
- Test debut (cap 706): 23 June 2022 v New Zealand
- Last Test: 31 July 2025 v India
- ODI debut (cap 278): 31 October 2024 v West Indies
- Last ODI: 13 November 2026 v Australia
- T20I debut (cap 104): 11 September 2024 v Australia
- Last T20I: 19 September 2026 v Sri Lanka

Domestic team information
- Years: Team
- 2012–2020: Somerset (squad no. 8)
- 2019: → Northamptonshire (on loan)
- 2020: → Surrey (on loan)
- 2021–present: Surrey (squad no. 88)
- 2022–2024: Manchester Originals
- 2023/24–present: Adelaide Strikers (squad no. 88)
- 2024: Gulf Giants
- 2025–present: Chennai Super Kings
- 2025–2026: London Spirit (squad no. 88)

Career statistics
Competition	Test	ODI	T20I	FC
Matches	2	20	27	99
Runs scored	106	318	88	2,410
Batting average	35.33	21.20	8.80	21.51
100s/50s	0/1	0/1	0/0	1/13
Top score	97	68	19	120
Balls bowled	450	737	413	12,909
Wickets	4	23	31	239
Bowling average	77.50	30.43	17.22	31.66
5 wickets in innings	0	0	0	6
10 wickets in match	0	0	0	0
Best bowling	2/98	3/22	3/18	6/61
Catches/stumpings	2/–	12/–	19/–	78/–
- Source: CricketArchive, 18 November 2026

Jamie Overton (born 10 April 1994) is an English cricketer who plays for Surrey County Cricket Club. He is a right-arm fast bowler who also bats right-handed. He made his debut for Somerset in the 2012 Clydesdale Bank 40 against Surrey. He made his international debut for the England cricket team in June 2022. His twin brother, Craig, plays for Somerset.

== Domestic career ==
Overton began a rise to wider prominence in the cricket world with a hostile spell of bowling in the opening match of the 2012 U-19 World Cup against Australia in Townsville, registering speeds approaching 93 mph (150 km/h) on his way to claiming two top-order wickets via slip catches held by his brother.

On 1 August 2020, it was announced that Overton had rejected Somerset's offer of a new contract and had chosen to join Surrey on a three-year contract ahead of the 2021 season. In the same month, during the 2020 Bob Willis Trophy, Overton scored his maiden century in first-class cricket. In September 2020, Overton requested to join Surrey immediately on loan for the remainder of the 2020 season.

In April 2022 he was bought by the Manchester Originals for the 2022 season of The Hundred. Overton was part of the Surrey team that won the 2022 County Championship.

In February 2023 he was retained by the Manchester Originals for the 2023 season of The Hundred. Overton was named player of the tournament for the 2023 season of The Hundred after several impressive performances with both bat and ball for the Originals. On 30 August 2023 Overton signed a new contract with Surrey after vastly contributing to Surrey's success since joining the club

In September 2023 Overton was signed by the Adelaide Strikers for the 2023-24 Big Bash league. In September 2024, He was signed as a platinum player by the same team for A$420,000.

On November 25, 2024, Overton was signed by the Chennai Super Kings for the 18th season of IPL (IPL 2025) during the 2025 Mega Auction for his base price of ₹1.5 crores.

== International career ==
On 29 May 2020, Overton was named in a 55-man group of players to begin training ahead of international fixtures starting in England following the COVID-19 pandemic. On 17 June 2020, Overton was included in England's 30-man squad to start training behind closed doors for the Test series against the West Indies.

In May 2022, a new initiative by the ECB designed to discover and track the bowling speed of cricketers in first class cricket showed Overton bowling at 90 mph. The following month, Overton was added to England's Test squad for the third and final match against New Zealand. He made his Test debut on 23 June 2022 for England against New Zealand.
