= England Lions cricket team in India in 2023–24 =

International cricket tour

	India A	England Lions
- Dates: 12 January – 4 February 2024
Captains	Abhimanyu Easwaran	Josh Bohannon

FC series
- Result: India A won the 3-match series 2–0
Most runs	Sai Sudharsan (221)	Keaton Jennings (310)
Most wickets	Akash Deep (11)	Matthew Potts (20)

The England Lions cricket team toured India in January and February 2024 to play the India A cricket team. The tour consisted of the three first-class matches. The series overlapped with the Test series between the senior sides. In December 2023, the England and Wales Cricket Board (ECB) confirmed the fixtures for the tour, with all matches taking place at Ahmedabad.

== Squads ==
India A	England Lions
Abhimanyu Easwaran (c); Sai Sudharsan; Rajat Patidar; Sarfaraz Khan; Pradosh Ranjan Paul; K.S. Bharat; Manav Suthar; Pulkit Narang; Navdeep Saini; Tushar Deshpande; Vidwath Kaverappa; Dhruv Jurel (wk); Akash Deep; Rinku Singh	Josh Bohannon (c); Kasey Aldridge; Brydon Carse; Jack Carson; James Coles; Matt Fisher; Keaton Jennings; Tom Lawes; Alex Lees; Dan Mousley; Callum Parkinson; Matthew Potts; Ollie Price; James Rew; Ollie Robinson

On 23 January 2024, Rinku Singh was added to India ‘A’ squad for 2nd four-day match.

== Tour match ==
12–13 January 2024
Scorecard

England Lions	v	India A
233 (51.1 overs); Dan Mousley 60 (66); Manav Suthar 3/45 (11 overs)		462/8d (91 overs); Rajat Patidar 111 (141); Jack Carson 2/65 (14 overs)

Match drawn
Narendra Modi Stadium B Ground, Ahmedabad
Umpires: Parashar Joshi and Mohamed Rafi

- England Lions won the toss and elected to bat first

== First-class series ==
=== 1st unofficial Test ===
17–20 January 2024
Scorecard

England Lions	v	India A
553/8d (118 overs); Keaton Jennings 154 (188); Manav Suthar 4/137 (29 overs)		227 (47 overs); Rajat Patidar 151 (158); Matthew Potts 4/30 (12 overs)
163/6d (29.3 overs); Keaton Jennings 64 (65); Pradosh Ranjan Paul 2/23 (3 overs)		426/5 (125 overs); K. S. Bharat 116* (165); Callum Parkinson 3/182 (43 overs)

Match drawn
Narendra Modi Stadium, Ahmedabad
Umpires: Abhijit Bhattacharya (Ind) and Saiyed Khalid (Ind)
Player of the match: Keaton Jennings (Lions)

- India A won the toss and elected to field first

=== 2nd unofficial Test ===
24–27 January 2024
Scorecard

England Lions	v	India A
152 (52.4 overs); Ollie Price 48 (81); Akash Deep 4/46 (13.4 overs)		489 (111.1 overs); Sarfaraz Khan 161 (160); Matthew Potts 6/125 (30.1 overs)
321 (90.2 overs); Ollie Robinson 85 (108); Saurabh Kumar 5/104 (29 overs)

India A won by an innings and 16 runs
Narendra Modi Stadium, Ahmedabad
Umpires: Ulhas Gandhe (Ind) and Saidharshan Kumar (Ind)
Player of the match: Sarfaraz Khan (Ind A)

- England Lions won the toss and elected to bat.

=== 3rd unofficial Test ===
1–4 February 2024
Scorecard

India A	v	England Lions
192 (50.2 overs); Devdutt Padikkal 65 (96); Matthew Potts 6/57 (16.2 overs)		199 (64.3 overs); Alex Lees 64 (136); Akash Deep 4/56 (21 overs)
409 (107.1 overs); Sai Sudharsan 117 (240); Dan Mousley 3/43 (13 overs)		268 (72.4 overs); Ollie Robinson 80 (105); Shams Mulani 5/60 (20 overs)

India A won by 134 runs
Narendra Modi Stadium, Ahmedabad
Umpires: Mohit Krishnadas (Ind) and Vinod Seshan (Ind)
Player of the match: Sai Sudharsan (Ind A)

- England Lions won the toss and elected to field.
