= List of England Test cricket records =

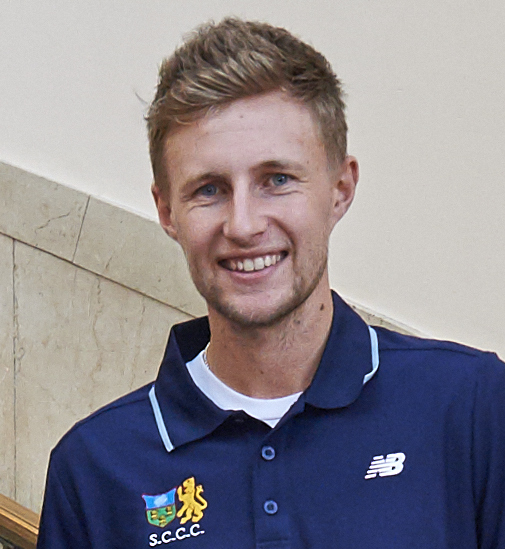
Captain Joe Root, pictured in 2017, holds several England Test cricket records.

Test cricket is the oldest form of cricket played at international level. A Test match is scheduled to take place over a period of five days, (Note: For the first 50 years of Test cricket matches were played over three or four days and until the 1930s some timeless Tests were played.) (Note: In October 2017, the ICC Board approved a trial of four-day Test cricket to run through until the 2019 Cricket World Cup.) and is played by teams representing full member nations of the International Cricket Council (ICC). England was a founding member of the ICC, having played the first Test match against Australia in March 1877 at the Melbourne Cricket Ground. As of September 2026, they have played more Test matches than any other team, and of their 1100 games, have won 408, drawn 356 and lost 336. With 37.1 percent of matches won, England are the third most successful team in the history of Test cricket, behind Australia on 48.4 per cent and South Africa on 39.9 per cent.

Captain and middle-order batsman Joe Root holds several England Test cricket records. Making his Test debut in 2012, as of August 2026 he has scored 14,278 runs – making him the second England player to score 10,000 Test runs and second overall in the list of top-scorers in Tests. He has made a record 69 half-centuries and 41 centuries, and was one half of the highest England Test partnership of 454. As a slip fielder, he holds the overall Test record for the most catches taken, with 220. Captaining his side from 2016 until 2022, and again from 2026, Root holds the record for the most matches played as English captain with 68.

The most successful Test wicket-taker for England is James Anderson, who made his Test debut in 2003 and retired in 2024. He played in a total of 188 Test matches and took 704 wickets, both records for England. He has also picked up five wickets in an innings on 32 occasions, which is the most for the national side. The corresponding record for taking ten wickets in a match is held by Sydney Barnes, who achieved this feat seven times. He also holds the Test record for the most wickets taken in a series, having removed members of the opposing side 49 times during the England tour of South Africa in 1913–14. Alan Knott is England's most successful wicket-keeper, having taken 269 dismissals. England claims two age records: James Southerton as the oldest player to make his Test debut, at 49, and Wilfred Rhodes, aged 52, as the oldest cricketer to ever play in a Test match.

== Key ==
The top five records are listed for each category, except for the team wins, losses and draws and the partnership records. Tied records for fifth place are also included. Explanations of the general symbols and cricketing terms used in the list are given below. Specific details are provided in each category where appropriate. All records include matches played for England only, and are correct as of September 2026.

Key
Symbol	Meaning
†	Player or umpire is currently active in Test cricket
*	Player remained not out or partnership remained unbroken
♠	Test cricket record
d	Innings was declared (e.g. 903/7d)
Date	Starting date of the Test match
Innings	Number of innings played
Matches	Number of matches played
Opposition	The team England was playing against
Period	The time period when the player was active in Test cricket
Player	The player involved in the record
Venue	Test cricket ground where the match was played

== Team records ==
=== Team wins, losses and draws ===
As of September 2026, England have played 1,100 Test matches, more than any other team, resulting in 408 victories, 356 draws and 336 defeats for an overall winning percentage of 37.1, the third highest winning percentage of Test playing teams. England is undefeated against Zimbabwe and Ireland, and has defeated Bangladesh on all but one occasion. England played the debut Test matches of Australia, India, New Zealand, South Africa, Sri Lanka and the West Indies – winning all of them except against Australia.

Opposition	First Test	Matches	Won	Lost	Drawn	Tied	% Won
Australia	15 March 1877	366	113	156	97	0	30.9
Bangladesh	21 October 2003	10	9	1	0	0	90.0
India	25 June 1932	141	53	37	51	0	37.6
Ireland	24 July 2019	2	2	0	0	0	100.0
New Zealand	10 January 1930	118	55	16	47	0	46.6
Pakistan	10 June 1954	95	33	23	39	0	34.7
South Africa	12 March 1889	156	66	35	55	0	42.3
Sri Lanka	17 February 1982	39	19	9	11	0	48.7
West Indies	23 June 1928	166	54	59	53	0	32.5
Zimbabwe	18 December 1996	7	4	0	3	0	57.1
Total		1100	408	336	356	0	37.1
Last updated: 12 September 2026

=== Team scoring records ===
==== Most runs in an innings ====
The highest innings total scored in Test cricket came in the series between Sri Lanka and India in August 1997. Playing in the first Test at the R. Premadasa Stadium in Colombo, the hosts posted a first innings total of 952/6d. This broke the longstanding record of 903/7d which England set against Australia in the final Test of the 1938 Ashes series at The Oval. This in turn broke England's 849 all out against the West Indies in 1930.

Rank	Score	Opposition	Venue	Date
1	903/7d	Australia	The Oval, London, England	20 August 1938
2	849	West Indies	Sabina Park, Kingston, Jamaica	3 April 1930
3	823/7d	Pakistan	Multan Cricket Stadium, Multan, Pakistan	7 October 2024
4	710/7d	India	Edgbaston, Birmingham, England	10 August 2011
5	669	India	Old Trafford, Manchester, England	26 July 2025
Last updated: 26 July 2025

==== Highest successful run chases ====
The highest successful run chase came in the West Indies victory over Australia in May 2003 at the Antigua Recreation Ground. Set 418 for victory in the final innings, the hosts achieved the target for the loss of seven wickets. England's highest successful chase came in the fifth Test of the 2021 series against India at Edgbaston (held over until 2022 due to the COVID-19 pandemic). England reached the target of 378 runs with seven wickets in hand, having successfully chased a target of over 300 runs in Test matches on only four previous occasions.

Rank	Score	Target	Opposition (Note: Prior to the establishment of the Commonwealth of Australia in 1901, there was no national flag of Australia – which for official purposes remained the Union Jack until 1954.)	Venue	Date
1	378/3	378	India	Edgbaston, Birmingham, England	1 July 2022
2	373/5	371	India	Headingley, Leeds, England	20 June 2025
3	362/9	359	Australia	Headingley, Leeds, England	22 August 2019
4	332/7	332	Australia	Melbourne Cricket Ground, Melbourne, Australia	29 December 1928
5	315/4	315	Australia	Headingley, Leeds, England	16 August 2001
Last updated: 24 June 2025

==== Fewest runs in an innings ====
The lowest innings total scored in Test cricket came in the second Test of England's tour of New Zealand in March 1955. Trailing England by 46, New Zealand were bowled out in their second innings for 26 runs. The equal twelfth-lowest score in Test history is England's total of 45 scored in their first innings against Australia in the first Test of the 1886–87 Ashes series.

Rank	Score	Opposition	Venue	Date
1	45	Australia	Sydney Cricket Ground, Sydney, Australia	28 January 1887
2	46	West Indies	Queen's Park Oval, Port of Spain, Trinidad and Tobago	25 March 1994
3	51	West Indies	Sabina Park, Kingston, Jamaica	4 February 2009
4	52	Australia	The Oval, London, England	14 August 1948
5	53	Australia	Lord's, London, England	16 July 1888
Last updated: 30 July 2018

=== Result records ===
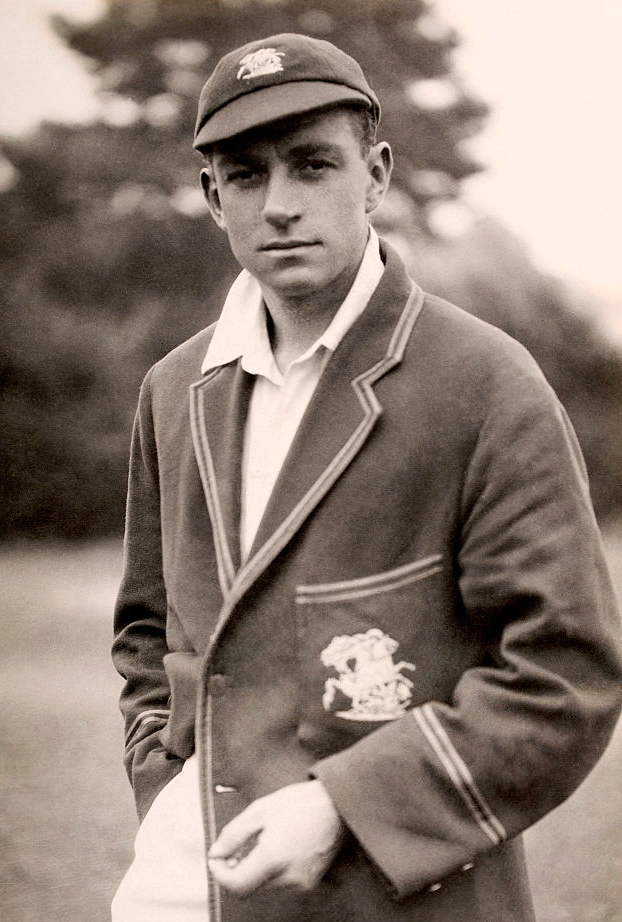
In 1938, Wally Hammond led England to victory over Australia by an innings and 579 runs, the greatest winning margin by an innings in Test cricket.

A Test match is won when one side has scored more runs than the total runs scored by the opposing side during their two innings. If both sides have completed both their allocated innings and the side that fielded last has the higher aggregate of runs, it is known as a win by runs. This indicates the number of runs that they had scored more than the opposing side. If one side scores more runs in a single innings than the total runs scored by the other side in both their innings, it is known as a win by an innings and runs. If the side batting last wins the match, it is known as a win by wickets, indicating the number of wickets that were still to fall.

==== Greatest win margins (by innings) ====
The fifth Test of the 1938 Ashes series at The Oval saw England win by an innings and 579 runs, the largest victory by an innings in Test cricket history. The next largest victory was Australia's win against South Africa in the first Test of the 2001–02 tour at the Wanderers Stadium, where the tourists won by an innings and 360 runs.

Rank	Margin	Opposition	Venue	Date
1	Innings and 579 runs ♠	Australia	The Oval, London, England	20 August 1938
2	Innings and 285 runs	India	Lord's, London, England	20 June 1974
3	Innings and 283 runs	West Indies	Headingley, Leeds, England	25 May 2007
4	Innings and 261 runs	Bangladesh	Lord's, London, England	26 May 2005
5	Innings and 244 runs	India	The Oval, London, England	15 August 2014
Last updated: 30 July 2018

==== Greatest win margins (by runs) ====
The greatest winning margin by runs in Test cricket was England's victory over Australia by 675 runs in the first Test of the 1928–29 Ashes series. The next two largest victories were recorded by Australia including defeat over England in the final Test of the 1934 Ashes series by 562 runs.

Rank	Margin	Opposition	Venue	Date
1	675 runs ♠	Australia	Brisbane Exhibition Ground, Brisbane, Australia	30 November 1928
2	354 runs	Pakistan	Trent Bridge, Nottingham, England	29 July 2010
3	347 runs	Australia	Lord's, London, England	18 July 2013
4	338 runs	Australia	Adelaide Oval, Adelaide, Australia	13 January 1933
5	330 runs	Pakistan	Old Trafford, Manchester, England	22 July 2016
Last updated: 30 July 2018

==== Greatest win margins (by 10 wickets) ====
England have won a Test match by a margin of 10 wickets on 22 occasions, the third highest behind Australia on 30 and the West Indies on 28. (Note: The other teams to have won a Test match by a margin of 10 wickets are Pakistan (13), Sri Lanka (10), India (9), South Africa (9) New Zealand (5) and Zimbabwe (1).)

Rank	Victories	Opposition	Most recent venue	Date
1	6	South Africa	Lord's, London, England	21 June 1951
2	5	West Indies	Edgbaston, Birmingham, England	28 July 2024
3	4	India	Wankhede Stadium, Mumbai, India	23 November 2012
4	3	Australia	Sydney Cricket Ground, Sydney, Australia	2 December 1932
5	2	Pakistan	Trent Bridge, Nottingham, England	10 August 1967
6	1	Sri Lanka	Old Trafford, Manchester, England	13 June 2002
6	1	Ireland	Lord's, London, England	1 June 2023
Last updated: 28 July 2024

==== Narrowest win margins (by runs) ====
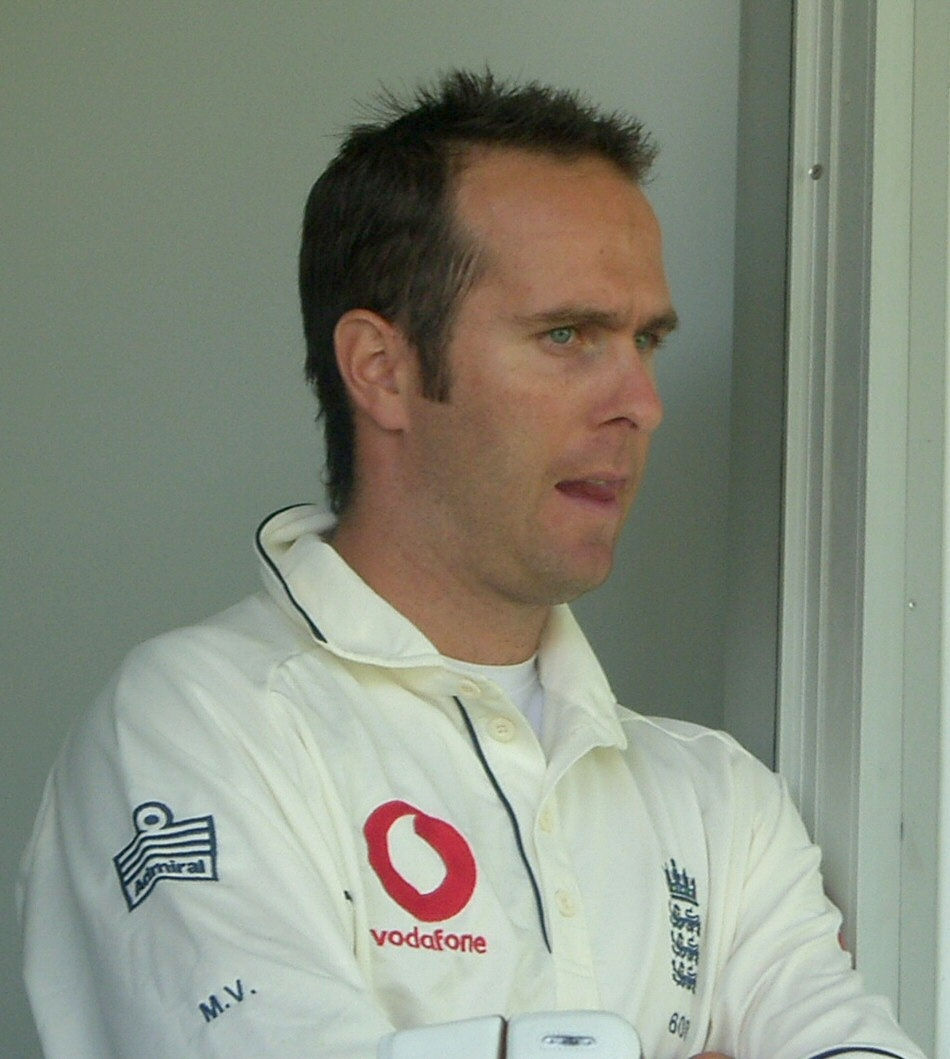
Michael Vaughan led England to victory over Australia in the second Test of the 2005 Ashes series by a margin of two runs.

England's narrowest win by runs was against Australia in the second Test of the 2005 Ashes series at Edgbaston. Set 282 runs for victory in the final innings, Australia were bowled all out for 279 to give victory to the hosts by two runs. This was the second-narrowest win in Test cricket, with the narrowest being the West Indies' one-run win over Australia in 1993.

Rank	Margin	Opposition	Venue	Date
1	2 runs	Australia	Edgbaston, Birmingham, England	4 August 2005
2	3 runs	Australia	Melbourne Cricket Ground, Melbourne, Australia	26 December 1982
3	10 runs	Australia	Sydney Cricket Ground, Sydney, Australia	14 December 1894
4	12 runs	Australia	Adelaide Oval, Adelaide, Australia	1 February 1929
4	12 runs	Australia	Melbourne Cricket Ground, Melbourne, Australia	26 December 1998
Last updated: 30 July 2018

==== Narrowest win margins (by wickets) ====
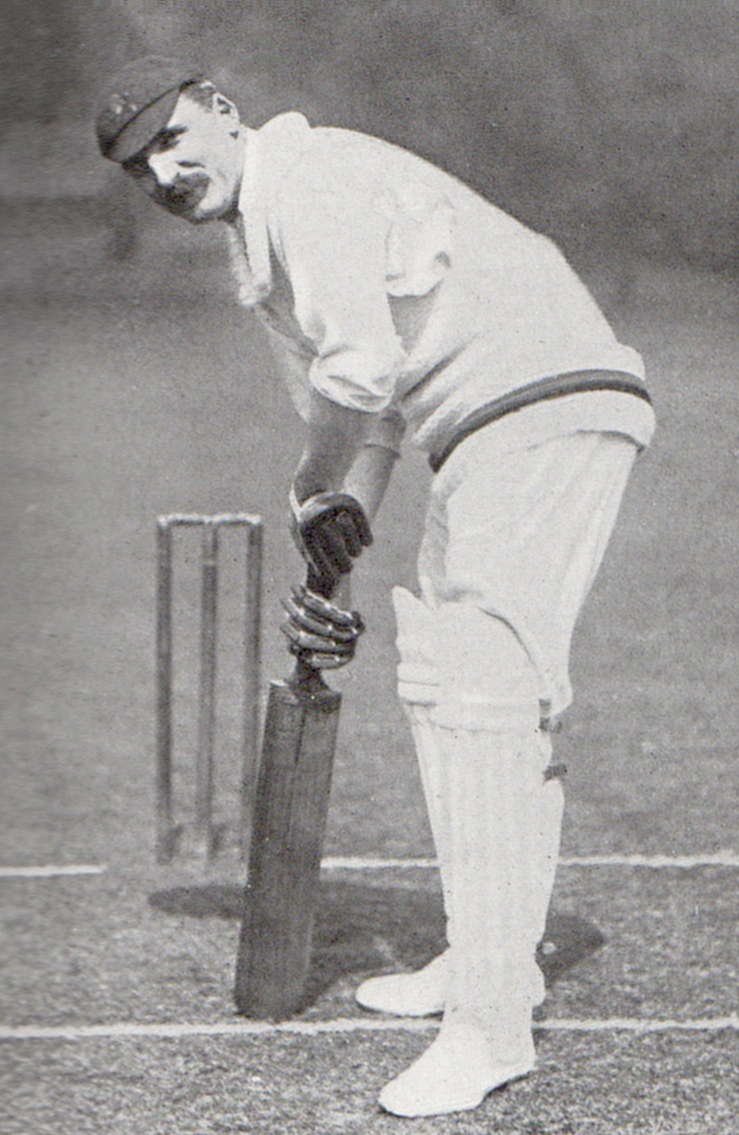
Archie MacLaren led the English team that lost the fourth Test of the 1902 Ashes series by a margin of three runs and won the fifth Test by a margin of one wicket. This record still stands over a century later as England's narrowest win by wickets though they have subsequently lost a Test by one run.

England have won by a margin of one wicket on four occasions, the most recent being the third Test of the 2019 Ashes series at Headingley. This match saw the hosts achieving their highest successful run chase in Test cricket of 359 runs, one of only fifteen one-wicket victories in Test cricket.

Rank	Margin	Opposition	Venue	Date
1	1 wicket	Australia	The Oval, London, England	11 August 1902
1	1 wicket	Australia	Melbourne Cricket Ground, Melbourne, Australia	1 January 1908
1	1 wicket	South Africa	Newlands Cricket Ground, Cape Town, South Africa	1 January 1923
1	1 wicket	Australia	Headingley, Leeds, England	22 August 2019
5	2 wickets	Australia	The Oval, London, England	11 August 1890
5	2 wickets	South Africa	Kingsmead Cricket Ground, Durban, South Africa	16 December 1948
5	2 wickets	South Africa	Centurion Park, Centurion, South Africa	14 January 2000
5	2 wickets	West Indies	Lord's, London, England	29 June 2000
Last updated: 1 September 2019

==== Greatest loss margins (by innings) ====
England suffered their greatest defeat by an innings at The Gabba in the first Test of the 1946–47 Ashes series, the first Test match to be played in Australia after the Second World War. Going down to the hosts by an innings and 332 runs, this is the fourth-heaviest defeat in Test cricket history.

Rank	Margin	Opposition	Venue	Date
1	Innings and 332 runs	Australia	The Gabba, Brisbane, Australia	29 November 1946
2	Innings and 226 runs	West Indies	Lord's, London, England	23 August 1973
3	Innings and 215 runs	Sri Lanka	Singhalese Sports Club Cricket Ground, Colombo, Sri Lanka	18 December 2003
4	Innings and 200 runs	Australia	Melbourne Cricket Ground, Melbourne, Australia	26 February 1937
5	Innings and 180 runs	West Indies	Edgbaston, Birmingham, England	14 June 1984
5	Innings and 180 runs	Australia	Trent Bridge, Nottingham, England	10 August 1989
Last updated: 30 July 2018

==== Greatest loss margins (by runs) ====
The first Test of the 1928–29 Ashes series saw Australia defeated by England by 675 runs, the greatest losing margin by runs in Test cricket. The results were reversed in the fifth and final Test of the 1934 Ashes series at The Oval where the tourists defeated the hosts by 562 runs, England's greatest defeat by runs.

Rank	Margin	Opposition	Venue	Date
1	562 runs	Australia	The Oval, London, England	18 August 1934
2	434 runs	India	Niranjan Shah Stadium, Rajkot, India	15 February 2024
3	425 runs	West Indies	Old Trafford, Manchester, England	8 July 1976
4	423 runs	New Zealand	Seddon Park, Hamilton, New Zealand	14 December 2024
5	409 runs	Australia	Lord's, London, England	24 June 1948
Last updated: 17 December 2024

==== Greatest loss margins (by 10 wickets) ====
England have lost a Test match by a margin of 10 wickets on 25 occasions, more than any other Test playing team. (Note: The other teams to have lost a Test match by a margin of 10 wickets are Afghanistan (1), Bangladesh (6), Sri Lanka (7), Zimbabwe (8), Pakistan (9), Australia (10), South Africa (12), New Zealand (13), the West Indies (16), and India (18))

Rank	Defeats	Opposition	Most recent venue	Date
1	8	West Indies	Sir Vivian Richards Stadium, North Sound, Antigua and Barbuda	24 March 2022
2	7	Australia	The Gabba, Brisbane, Australia	23 November 2017
3	4	Pakistan	The Oval, London, England	11 August 2016
4	3	South Africa	Headingley, Leeds, England	18 July 2008
5	2	India	Narendra Modi Stadium, Ahmedabad, India	24 February 2021
6	1	Sri Lanka	The Oval, London, England	27 August 1998
Last updated: 28 March 2022

==== Narrowest loss margins (by runs) ====
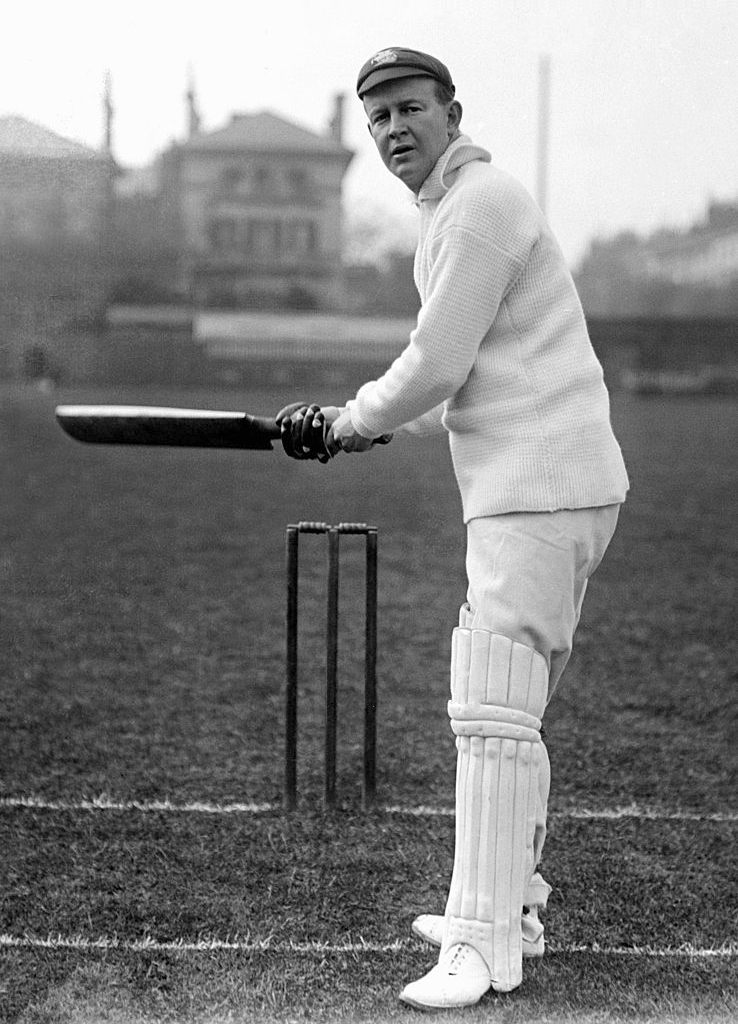
Plum Warner was the captain of the English team that lost the first Test against South Africa in January 1906 by a margin of one wicket, the narrowest loss for England by wickets.

Only two matches in 149 years of Test cricket have been decided by a margin of one run. First was the fourth Test of the West Indian tour of Australia in 1992–93 where the visitors secured victory, which was equalled in England's loss in the second Test of their 2023 tour to New Zealand at Basin Reserve, Wellington. England had made New Zealand follow-on, but a second innings of 483 from the home team set a target of 257. This was also only the fourth time that a team made to follow-on had won a Test.

Rank	Margin	Opposition	Venue	Date
1	1 run	New Zealand	Basin Reserve, Wellington, New Zealand	24 February 2023
2	3 runs	Australia	Old Trafford, Manchester, England	24 July 1902
3	6 runs	Australia	Sydney Cricket Ground, Sydney, Australia	20 February 1885
3	6 runs	India	The Oval, London, England	31 July 2025
5	7 runs	Australia	The Oval, London, England	28 August 1882
Last updated: 4 August 2025

==== Narrowest loss margins (by wickets) ====
Test cricket has seen fifteen matches decided by a margin of one wicket, with England being defeated in one of them. The first Test of the 1905–06 series against South Africa at Old Wanderers saw the home side chase down the target of 284 runs in the final innings.

Rank	Margin	Opposition (Note: Prior to the unification of the South African colonies in 1910, there was no national flag of South Africa.)	Venue	Date
1	1 wicket	South Africa	Old Wanderers, Johannesburg, South Africa	2 January 1906
2	2 wickets	Australia	Sydney Cricket Ground, Sydney, Australia	13 December 1907
2	2 wickets	West Indies	Trent Bridge, Nottingham, England	5 June 1980
2	2 wickets	Pakistan	Lord's London, England	18 June 1992
2	2 wickets	Australia	Edgbaston Birmingham, England	16 June 2023
Last updated: 16 August 2023

== Individual records ==
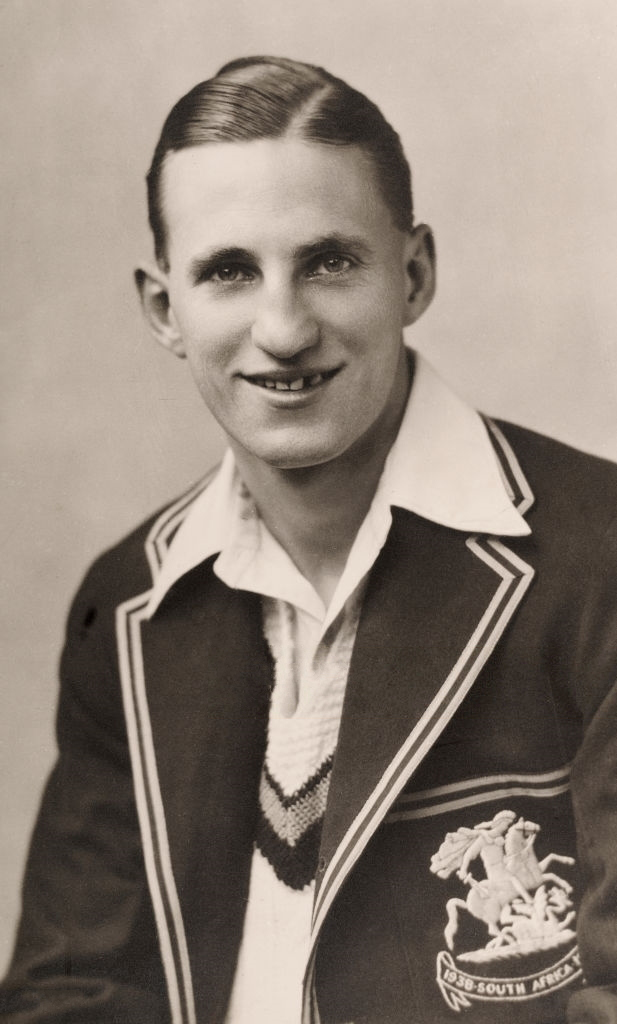
Len Hutton has scored the highest individual Test score (364) for England.

=== Batting records ===
==== Most career runs ====
A run is the basic means of scoring in cricket. A run is scored when the batsman hits the ball with his bat and with his partner runs the length of 22 yards (20 m) of the pitch. India's Sachin Tendulkar has scored the most runs in Test cricket with 15,921. England's Joe Root, one of two England batsman to have scored more than 10,000 runs in Test cricket, is currently in second place.

Rank	Runs	Player	Innings	Period
1	14,278	Joe Root†	309	2012–2026
2	12,472	Alastair Cook	291	2006–2018
3	8,900	Graham Gooch	215	1975–1995
4	8,463	Alec Stewart	235	1990–2003
5	8,231	David Gower	204	1978–1992
6	8,181	Kevin Pietersen	181	2005–2014
7	8,114	Geoff Boycott	193	1964–1982
8	7,728	Mike Atherton	212	1989–2001
9	7,727	Ian Bell	205	2004–2015
10	7,624	Colin Cowdrey	188	1954–1975
Last updated: 12 September 2026

==== Highest individual score ====
The final Test of the 2003–04 series of the Wisden Trophy, contested between England and the West Indies, at the Antigua Recreation Ground saw Brian Lara of the West Indies set the highest Test score with 400 not out. Len Hutton's score of 364 runs against Australia during the final Test of the 1938 Ashes series at The Oval is the sixth highest individual score in Test cricket and the highest by an England player. Wally Hammond's 336, scored against New Zealand in 1933, is the third highest not out Test innings and the ninth highest overall. Hutton's, Hammond's and Andy Sandham's 325 against the West Indies in 1930 were Test record scores at the time they were scored.

Rank	Runs	Player	Opposition	Venue	Date
1	364	Len Hutton	Australia	The Oval, London, England	20 August 1938
2	336*	Wally Hammond	New Zealand	Eden Park, Auckland, New Zealand	31 March 1933
3	333	Graham Gooch	India	Lord's, London, England	26 July 1990
4	325	Andy Sandham	West Indies	Sabina Park, Kingston, Jamaica	3 April 1930
5	317	Harry Brook	Pakistan	Multan Cricket Stadium, Multan, Pakistan	7 October 2024
Last updated: 10 October 2024

==== Highest career average ====
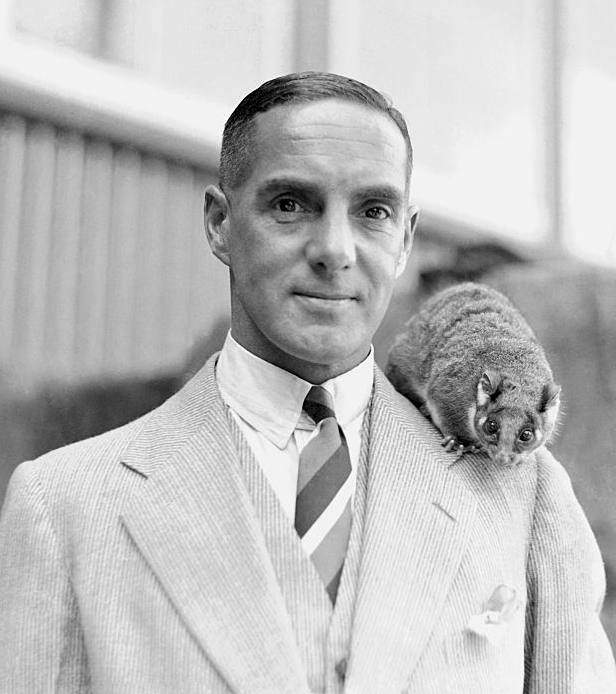
Herbert Sutcliffe has the highest completed career batting average for England with 60.73.

A batsman's batting average is the total number of runs they have scored divided by the number of times they have been dismissed.

Australia's Don Bradman, widely acknowledged as the greatest batsman of all time, finished his Test career with an average of 99.94. With 60.73, Herbert Sutcliffe is one of only five batsmen to finish his international career with an average above 60.

Rank	Average	Player	Runs	Innings	Not out	Period
1	60.7	Herbert Sutcliffe	4,555	84	9	1924–1935
2	59.2	Eddie Paynter	1,540	31	5	1931–1939
3	58.7	Ken Barrington	6,806	131	15	1955–1968
4	58.5	Wally Hammond	7,249	140	16	1927–1947
5	56.9	Jack Hobbs	5,410	102	7	1908–1930
Qualification: 20 innings. Last updated: 24 November 2025

==== Most half-centuries ====
A half-century is a score of between 50 and 99 runs. Statistically, once a batsman's score reaches 100, it is no longer considered a half-century but a century. England's Joe Root holds the overall test record for most half-centuries scored.

Rank	Half centuries	Player	Innings	Period
1	69 ♠	Joe Root†	309	2012–2026
2	57	Alastair Cook	291	2006–2018
3	46	Michael Atherton	212	1989–2001
3	46	Ian Bell	205	2004–2015
3	46	Graham Gooch	215	1975–1995
Last updated: 12 September 2026

==== Most centuries ====
A century is a score of 100 or more runs in a single innings. Tendulkar has also scored the most centuries in Test cricket with 51. South Africa's Jacques Kallis is next on 45. The highest ranked England player is Joe Root in joint-third place, with 41 centuries.

Rank	Centuries	Player	Innings	Period
1	41	Joe Root†	309	2012–2026
2	33	Alastair Cook	291	2006–2018
3	23	Kevin Pietersen	181	2005–2014
4	22	Wally Hammond	140	1927–1947
4	22	Colin Cowdrey	188	1954–1975
4	22	Geoffrey Boycott	193	1964–1982
4	22	Ian Bell	205	2004–2015
Last updated: 12 September 2026

==== Most double centuries ====
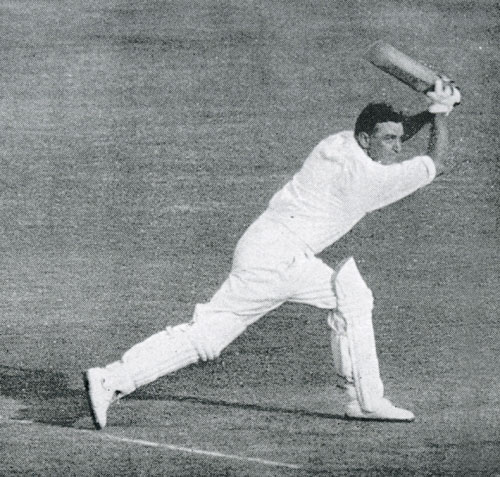
Wally Hammond has scored the most double centuries for England with seven and holds the England record for the most runs scored in a series with 905 runs during the 1928–29 Ashes series.

A double century is a score of 200 or more runs in a single innings. Bradman holds the Test record for the most double centuries scored with twelve. England's Wally Hammond is joint-fourth on the list, with seven doube centuries.

Rank	Double centuries	Player	Innings	Period
1	7	Wally Hammond	140	1927–1947
2	6	Joe Root†	309	2012–2026
3	5	Alastair Cook	291	2006–2018
4	4	Len Hutton	138	1937–1955
5	3	Kevin Pietersen	181	2005–2014
Last updated: 12 September 2026

==== Most triple centuries ====
A triple century is a score of 300 or more runs in a single innings. Four cricketers hold the Test record for the most triple centuries scored with two – Don Bradman, India's Virender Sehwag and West Indians Chris Gayle and Brian Lara. Six England players have scored a single Test triple century.

Rank	Triple centuries	Player	Innings	Period
1	1	Harry Brook†	70	2022–2026
1	1	John Edrich	127	1963–1976
1	1	Graham Gooch	215	1975–1995
1	1	Wally Hammond	140	1927–1947
1	1	Len Hutton	138	1937–1955
1	1	Andy Sandham	23	1921–1930
Last updated: 12 September 2026

==== Most runs in a series ====
The 1930 Ashes series in England saw Bradman set the record for the most runs scored in a single series, falling just 26 short of 1,000 runs. He is followed by Wally Hammond with 905 runs scored in the 1928–29 Ashes series. Alastair Cook's 766 runs scored during the 2010–11 Ashes series ranks in 14th.

Rank	Runs	Player	Matches	Innings	Series
1	905	Wally Hammond	5	9	1928–29 Ashes series
2	766	Alastair Cook	5	7	2010–11 Ashes series
3	753	Denis Compton	5	8	South African cricket team in England in 1947
4	752	Graham Gooch	3	6	Indian cricket team in England in 1990
5	737	Joe Root	5	9	Indian cricket team in England in 2021
Last updated: 5 July 2022

==== Most ducks ====
A duck refers to a batsman being dismissed without scoring a run. Former West Indian fast bowler Courtney Walsh has scored the highest number of ducks in Test cricket with 43, followed by England's Stuart Broad with 39. James Anderson, with 34 scoreless innings, is seventh on the list.

Rank	Ducks	Player	Matches	Innings	Period
1	39	Stuart Broad	167	244	2007–2023
2	34	James Anderson	188	265	2003–2024
3	20	Monty Panesar	50	68	2006–2013
3	20	Steve Harmison	62	84	2002–2009
3	20	Michael Atherton	115	212	1989–2001
Last updated: 28 July 2024

=== Bowling records ===
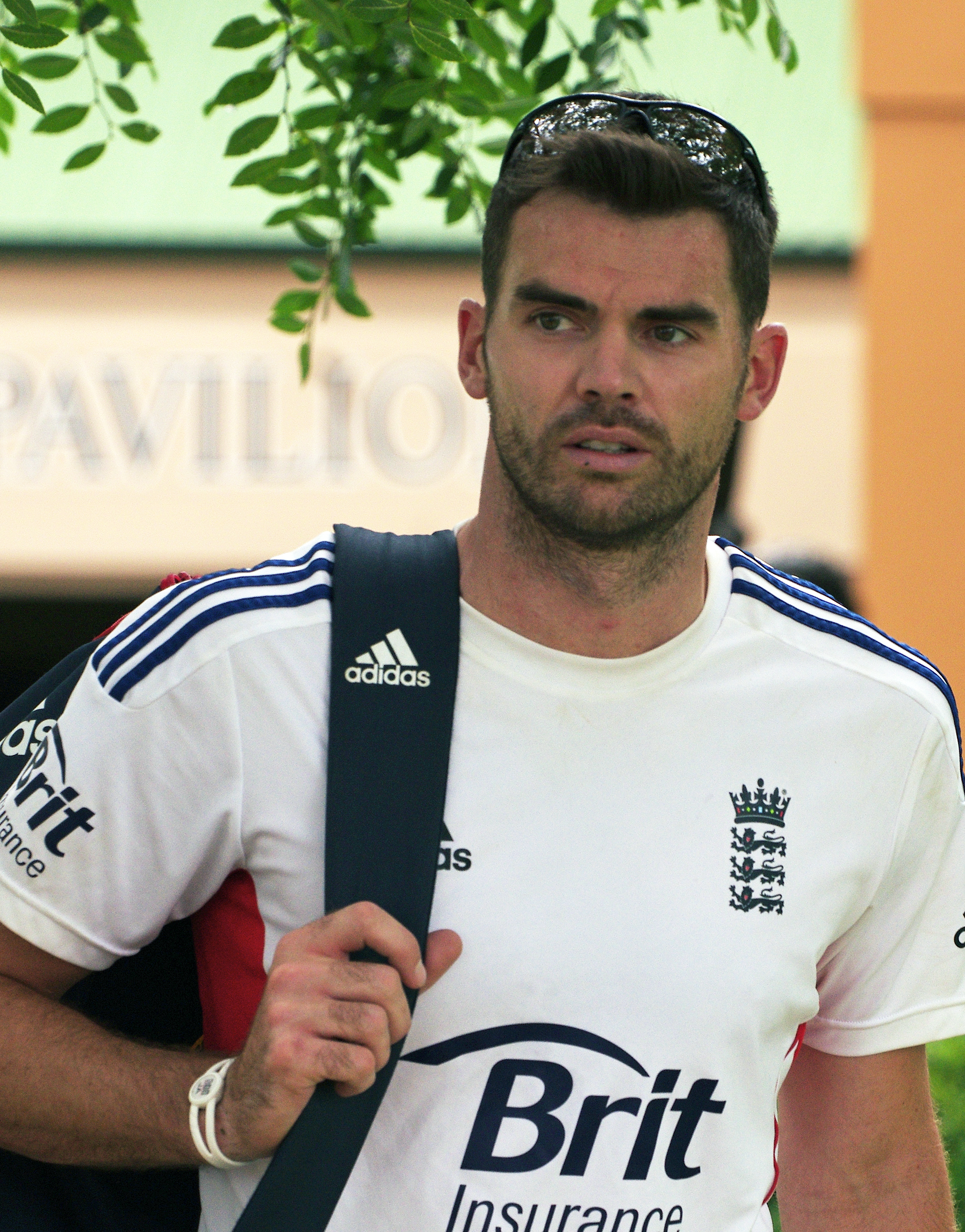
James Anderson holds the record for the most wickets taken by a fast bowler in Test cricket with 704.

==== Most career wickets ====
A bowler takes the wicket of a batsman when the form of dismissal is bowled, caught, leg before wicket, stumped or hit wicket. If the batsman is dismissed by run out, obstructing the field, handling the ball, hitting the ball twice or timed out the bowler does not receive credit.

Sri Lankan bowler Muttiah Muralitharan holds the record for taking the most wickets in Test cricket with 800, followed by Australia's Shane Warne who previously held the record with 708. James Anderson of England is third on the list with 704 Test wickets to his name, having passed Australia's Glenn McGrath to become the fast bowler with the most Test wickets in September 2018. Stuart Broad, with 604, is the second-highest England Test wicket-taker and fifth overall, after becoming the second fast bowler to overtake McGrath's total of 563 wickets in September 2022. Of genuine all-rounders, no England player has taken more wickets than Ian Botham, who also scored 5,200 Test runs.

Rank	Wickets	Player	Matches	Runs	Period
1	704	James Anderson	188	18,627	2003–2024
2	604	Stuart Broad	167	16,719	2007–2023
3	383	Ian Botham	102	10,878	1977–1992
4	325	Bob Willis	90	8,190	1971–1984
5	307	Fred Trueman	67	6,625	1952–1965
6	297	Derek Underwood	86	7,674	1966–1982
7	255	Graeme Swann	60	7,642	2008–2013
8	252	Brian Statham	70	6,261	1951–1965
8	252	Ben Stokes†	122	7,808	2013–2026
10	248	Matthew Hoggard	67	7,564	2000–2008
Last updated: 29 June 2026

==== Best figures in an innings ====
Bowling figures refers to the number of the wickets a bowler has taken and the number of runs conceded.

There have been three occasions in Test cricket where a bowler has taken all ten wickets in a single innings – Jim Laker of England took 10/53 against Australia in 1956, India's Anil Kumble in 1999 returned figures of 10/74 against Pakistan and in 2021 Ajaz Patel of New Zealand took 10/119 against India. George Lohmann, one of sixteen bowlers who have taken nine wickets in a Test match innings, sits fourth on the list taking figures of 9/28 against South Africa in 1896.

Rank	Figures	Player	Opposition	Venue	Date
1	10/53 ♠	Jim Laker	Australia	Old Trafford, Manchester, England	26 July 1956
2	9/28	George Lohmann	South Africa	Old Wanderers, Johannesburg, South Africa	2 March 1896
3	9/37	Jim Laker	Australia	Old Trafford, Manchester, England	26 July 1956
4	9/57	Devon Malcolm	South Africa	The Oval, London, England	18 August 1994
5	9/103	Sydney Barnes	South Africa	Old Wanderers, Johannesburg, South Africa	26 December 1913
Last updated: 30 July 2018

==== Best figures in a match ====
A bowler's bowling figures in a match is the sum of the wickets taken and the runs conceded over both innings.

No bowler in the history of Test cricket has taken all 20 wickets in a match. The closest to do so was English spin bowler Jim Laker. During the fourth Test of the 1956 Ashes series, Laker took 9/37 in the first innings and 10/53 in the second to finish with match figures of 19/90. Sydney Barnes's figures of 17/159, taken in the second Test of the 1913–14 South African tour, is the second-best in Test cricket history.

Rank	Figures	Player	Opposition	Venue	Date
1	19/90 ♠	Jim Laker	Australia	Old Trafford, Manchester, England	26 July 1956
2	17/159	Sydney Barnes	South Africa	Old Wanderers, Johannesburg, South Africa	26 December 1913
3	15/28	Johnny Briggs	South Africa	Newlands Cricket Ground, Cape Town, South Africa	25 March 1889
4	15/45	George Lohmann	South Africa	St George's Park Cricket Ground, Port Elizabeth, South Africa	13 February 1896
5	15/99	Colin Blythe	South Africa	Headingley, Leeds, England	29 July 1907
Last updated: 30 July 2018

==== Best career average ====
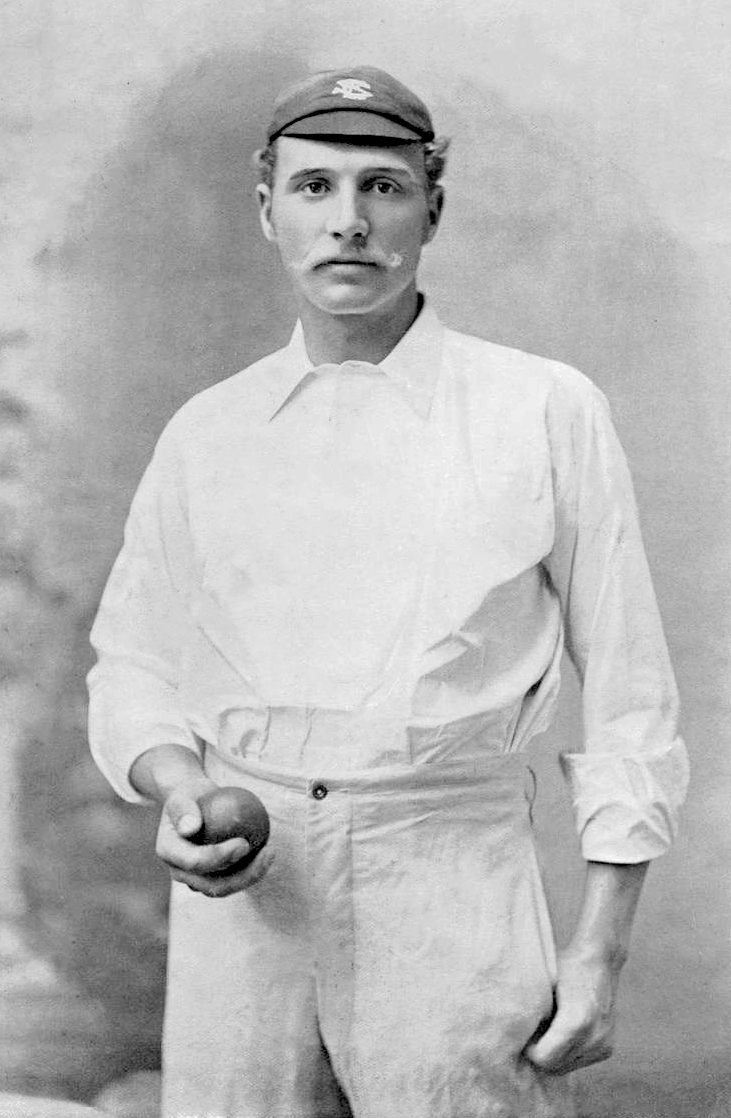
George Lohmann holds the record for the best Test career bowling average and strike rate, with figures of 10.75 and 34.1, respectively.

A bowler's bowling average is the total number of runs they have conceded divided by the number of wickets they have taken. Nineteenth century English medium pacer George Lohmann holds the record for the best career average in Test cricket with 10.75. J. J. Ferris, one of fifteen cricketers to have played Test cricket for more than one team, is second behind Lohmann with an overall career average of 12.70 runs per wicket. Billy Barnes is third on the list, finishing his Test career with an average of 15.54.

Rank	Average	Player	Wickets	Runs	Balls	Period
1	10.75 ♠	George Lohmann	112	1,205	3,830	1886–1896
2	15.54	Billy Barnes	51	793	2,289	1880–1890
3	16.42	Billy Bates	50	821	2,364	1881–1887
4	16.43	Sydney Barnes	189	3,106	7,873	1901–1914
5	16.98	Bobby Peel	101	1,715	5,216	1884–1896
Qualification: 25 wickets. Last updated: 21 August 2026

==== Best career strike rate ====
A bowler's strike rate is the total number of balls they have bowled divided by the number of wickets they have taken. As with the career average above, the bowler with the best Test career strike rate is George Lohmann, with on 34.1 balls per wicket.

Rank	Strike rate	Player	Wickets	Balls	Period
1	34.1 ♠	George Lohmann	112	3,830	1886–1896
2	38.3	Josh Tongue †	76	2,918	2023–2026
3	38.8	Bernard Bosanquet	25	970	1903–1905
4	41.6	Gus Atkinson †	83	3,457	2024–2026
5	41.6	Sydney Barnes	189	7,873	1901–1914
Qualification: 25 wickets. Last updated: 12 September 2026

==== Best career economy rate ====
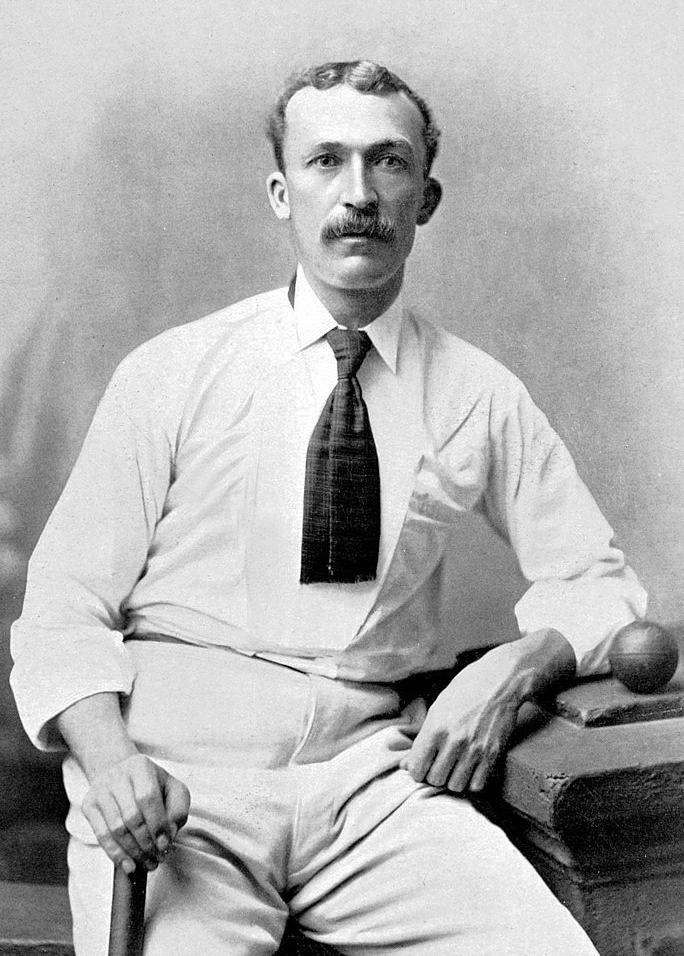
William Attewell finished his career with an economy rate of 1.31, a Test cricket record.

A bowler's economy rate is the total number of runs they have conceded divided by the number of overs they have bowled. English bowler William Attewell, who played 10 Tests between 1884 and 1892, holds the Test record for the best career economy rate with 1.31.

Rank	Economy rate	Player	Runs	Balls	Wickets	Period
1	1.31 ♠	William Attewell	626	2,850	28	1884–1892
2	1.56	Alfred Shaw	285	1,096	12	1877–1882
3	1.60	Cliff Gladwin	571	2,129	15	1947–1949
4	1.85	Roy Kilner	734	2,368	24	1924–1926
5	1.87	Dick Barlow	767	2,456	34	1881–1887
Qualification: 1,000 balls. Last updated: 21 August 2026

==== Most five-wicket hauls in an innings ====
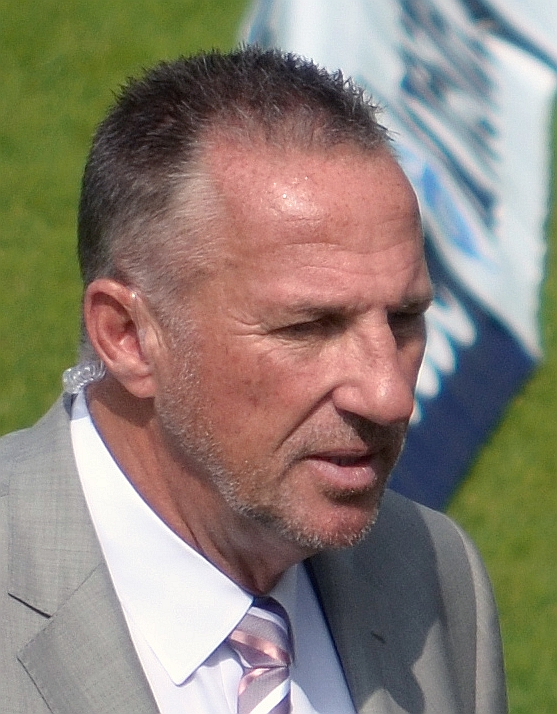
Ian Botham is second to James Anderson for the England record for the most Test five-wicket hauls.

A five-wicket haul refers to a bowler taking five wickets in a single innings.

Sri Lanka's Muttiah Muralitharan has taken the most five-wicket hauls in Test cricket with 67 throughout his career followed by Shane Warne achieving 37. James Anderson is the highest ranked England player in sixth, with 32.

Rank	Five-wicket hauls	Player	Innings	Balls	Wickets	Period
1	32	James Anderson	350	40,037	704	2003–2024
2	27	Ian Botham	168	21,815	383	1977–1992
3	24	Sydney Barnes	50	7,873	189	1901–1914
4	20	Stuart Broad	309	33,698	604	2007–2023
5	17	Fred Trueman	127	15,178	307	1952–1965
5	17	Graeme Swann	109	15,349	255	2008–2013
5	17	Derek Underwood	151	21,862	297	1966–1982
Last updated: 12 July 2024

==== Most ten-wicket hauls in a match ====
A ten-wicket haul refers to a bowler taking ten or more wickets in a match over two innings.

As with the five-wicket hauls above, Muttiah Muralitharan leads Shane Warne in taking the most ten-wicket hauls in Test cricket with Muralitharan having taken 22 to Warne's 10. Sydney Barnes of England is in equal sixth with three other bowlers, each achieving the feat on seven occasions.

Rank	Ten-wicket hauls	Player	Matches	Balls	Wickets	Period
1	7	Sydney Barnes	27	7,873	189	1901–1914
2	6	Derek Underwood	86	21,862	297	1966–1982
3	5	George Lohmann	18	3,830	112	1886–1896
3	5	Alec Bedser	51	15,918	236	1946–1955
5	4	Tom Richardson	14	4,498	88	1893–1898
5	4	Colin Blythe	19	4,546	100	1901–1910
5	4	Johnny Briggs	33	5,332	118	1884–1899
5	4	Ian Botham	102	21,815	383	1977–1992
Last updated: 11 August 2019

==== Worst figures in an innings ====
The worst figures in a single innings in Test cricket came in the third Test between the West Indies at home to Pakistan in 1958. Pakistan's Khan Mohammad returned figures of 0/259 from his 54 overs in the second innings of the match. The worst figures by an England player are 0/169 that came off the bowling of Tich Freeman in his final Test appearance.

Rank	Figures	Player	Overs	Opposition	Venue	Date
1	0/169	Tich Freeman	49	South Africa	The Oval, London, England	17 August 1929
2	0/163	Adil Rashid	34	Pakistan	Zayed Sports City Stadium, Abu Dhabi, United Arab Emirates	13 October 2015
3	0/155	Moeen Ali	52	South Africa	Newlands Cricket Ground, Cape Town, South Africa	2 January 2016
4	0/152	Pat Pocock	57	West Indies	Sabina Park, Kingston, Jamaica	16 February 1974
5	0/151	Graeme Swann	52	South Africa	The Oval, London, England	19 July 2012
Last updated: 30 July 2018

==== Worst figures in a match ====
The worst figures in a match in Test cricket were taken by South Africa's Imran Tahir in the second Test against Australia at the Adelaide Oval in November 2012. He returned figures of 0/180 from his 23 overs in the first innings and 0/80 off 14 in the third innings for a total of 0/260 from 37 overs. He claimed the record in his final over when two runs came from it – enough for him to pass the previous record of 0/259, set 54 years prior.

The worst figures by an England player came in the fourth Test of the 1989–90 tour of the West Indies when Devon Malcolm returned figures of 0/142 and 0/46 for a total of 0/188 off 43 overs.

Rank	Figures	Player	Overs	Opposition	Venue	Date
1	0/188	Devon Malcolm	43	West Indies	Kensington Oval, Bridgetown, Barbados	5 April 1990
2	0/184	Ian Salisbury	33	Pakistan	Old Trafford, Manchester, England	2 July 1992
3	0/184	Maurice Tate	100	Australia	Melbourne Cricket Ground, Melbourne, Australia	8 March 1929
4	0/169	Tich Freeman	49	South Africa	The Oval, London, England	17 August 1929
5	0/166	Hedley Verity	57	Australia	The Oval, London, England	18 August 1934
Last updated: 30 July 2018

==== Most wickets in a series ====
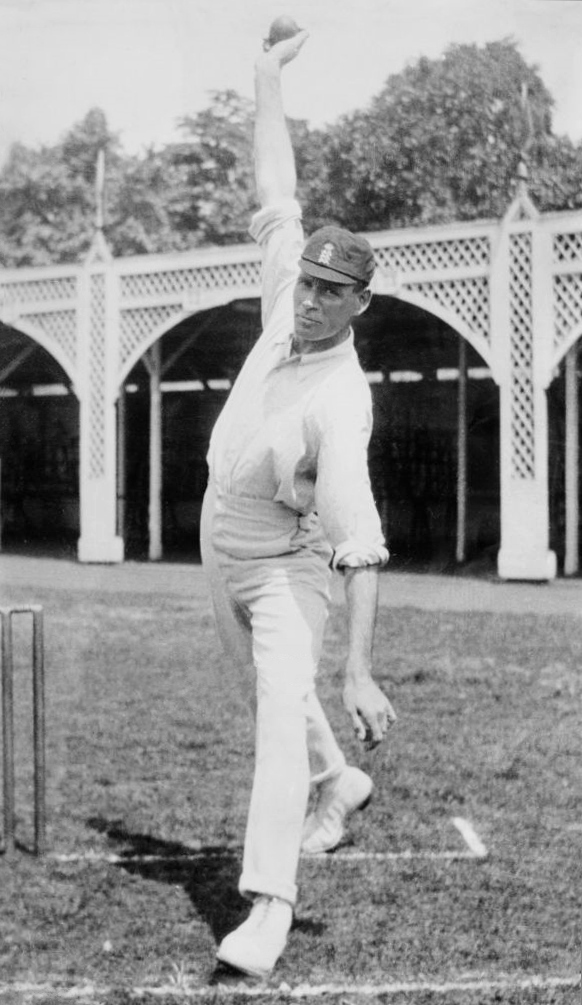
Sydney Barnes took 49 wickets in the 1913–14 series against South Africa, the most by any cricketer in a Test series.

England's seventh Test tour of South Africa in 1913–14 saw the record set for the most wickets taken by a bowler in a Test series. English paceman Sydney Barnes played in four of the five matches and achieved a total of 49 wickets to his name. Jim Laker sits second on the list with 46 wickets taken during the 1956 Ashes series.

Rank	Wickets	Player	Matches	Series
1	49 ♠	Sydney Barnes	4	English cricket team in South Africa in 1913–14
2	46	Jim Laker	5	1956 Ashes series
3	39	Sydney Barnes	6	1912 Triangular Tournament
3	39	Alec Bedser	5	1953 Ashes series
5	38	Maurice Tate	5	1924–25 Ashes series
Last updated: 30 July 2018

=== Wicket-keeping records ===
The wicket-keeper is a specialist fielder who stands behind the stumps being guarded by the batsman on strike and is the only member of the fielding side allowed to wear gloves and leg pads.

==== Most career dismissals ====
A wicket-keeper can be credited with the dismissal of a batsman in two ways, caught or stumped. A fair catch is taken when the ball is caught fully within the field of play without it bouncing after the ball has touched the striker's bat or glove holding the bat, while a stumping occurs when the wicket-keeper puts down the wicket while the batsman is out of his ground and not attempting a run.

South Africa's Mark Boucher has taken the most dismissals in Test cricket as a designated wicket-keeper with 555, followed by Adam Gilchrist of Australia on 416. England's Alan Knott, who took 269 dismissals during his 95-Test match career, is eighth on the list. He is followed by his compatriots Matt Prior and Alec Stewart in tenth and eleventh with 256 and 241 dismissals respectively.

Rank	Dismissals	Player	Matches	Period
1	269	Alan Knott	95	1967–1981
2	256	Matt Prior	79	2007–2014
3	241	Alec Stewart	133	1990–2003
4	223	Jonny Bairstow	100	2012–2024
5	219	Godfrey Evans	91	1946–1959
Last updated: 9 March 2024

==== Most career catches ====
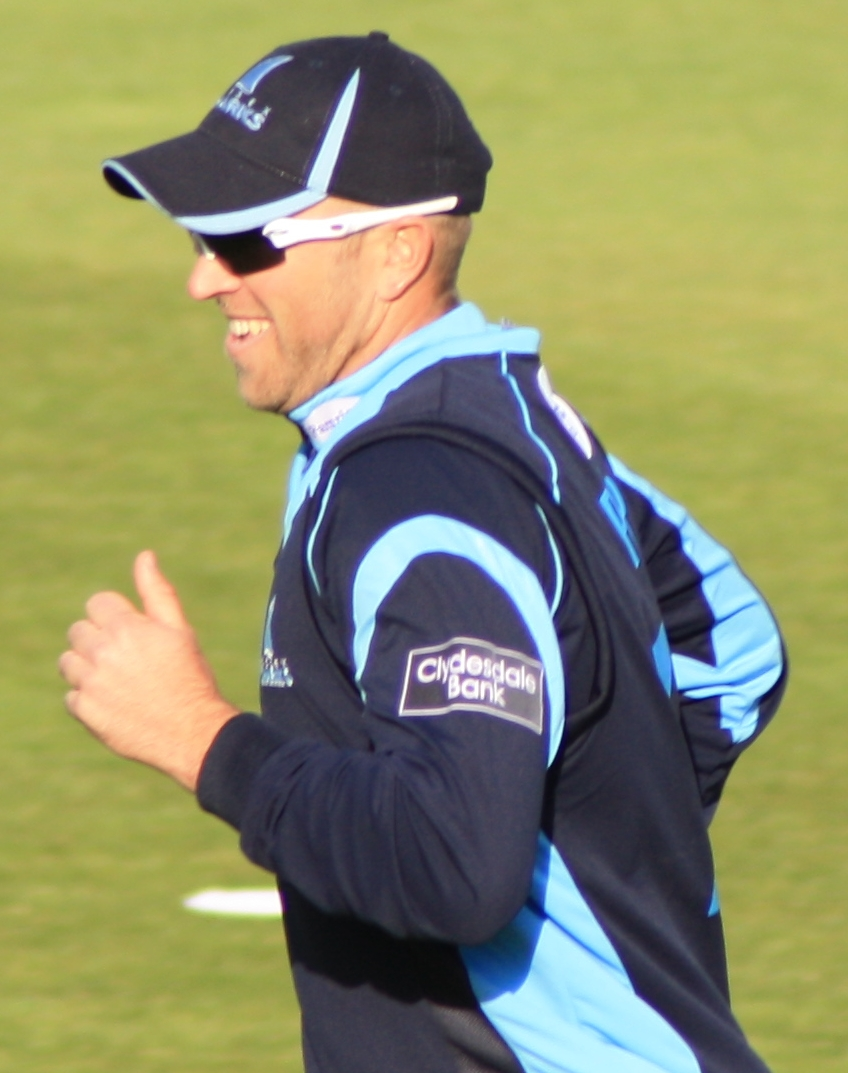
Matt Prior sits second behind Alan Knott for the most Test dismissals and catches taken by an England wicket-keeper.

Boucher also leads Gilchrist in the number of catches taken as a designated wicket-keeper in Test cricket, 532 to 379. Alan Knott, with 250 catches to his name is ninth on this list. He is again followed by Prior and Stewart in tenth and eleventh with 243 and 227 catches respectively.

Rank	Catches	Player	Matches	Period
1	250	Alan Knott	95	1967–1981
2	243	Matt Prior	79	2007–2014
3	227	Alec Stewart	133	1990–2003
4	209	Jonny Bairstow	100	2012–2024
5	173	Godfrey Evans	91	1946–1959
Last updated: 9 March 2024

==== Most career stumpings ====
Australia's Bert Oldfield holds the record for the most stumpings in Test cricket with 52. He is followed by Godfrey Evans of England with 46 to his name.

Rank	Stumpings	Player	Matches	Period
1	46	Godfrey Evans	91	1946–1955
2	23	Les Ames	44	1929–1939
3	22	Dick Lilley	35	1896–1909
4	19	Alan Knott	95	1967–1981
5	15	George Duckworth	24	1924–1936
Last updated: 7 October 2019

==== Most dismissals in an innings ====
Four wicket-keepers have taken seven dismissals in a single innings in a Test match—Wasim Bari of Pakistan in 1979, Englishman Bob Taylor in 1980, New Zealand's Ian Smith in 1991 and most recently West Indian gloveman Ridley Jacobs against Australia in 2000.

The feat of taking 6 dismissals in an innings has been achieved by 25 wicket-keepers on 33 occasions including 7 Englishmen on 11 occasions.

Rank	Dismissals	Player	Opposition	Venue	Date
1	7 ♠	Bob Taylor	India	Wankhede Stadium, Mumbai, India	15 February 1980
2	6	John Murray	India	Lord's, London, England	22 June 1967
2	6	Jack Russell	Australia	Melbourne Cricket Ground, Melbourne, Australia	26 December 1990
2	6	Jack Russell	South Africa	Wanderers Stadium, Johannesburg, South Africa	30 November 1995
2	6	Alec Stewart	Australia	Old Trafford, Manchester, England	3 July 1997
2	6	Chris Read	New Zealand	Edgbaston, Birmingham, England	1 July 1999
2	6	Geraint Jones	Bangladesh	Riverside Ground, Chester-le-Street, England	3 June 2005
2	6	Chris Read	Australia	Melbourne Cricket Ground, Melbourne, Australia	26 December 2006
2	6	Chris Read	Australia	Sydney Cricket Ground, Sydney, Australia	2 January 2007
2	6	Matt Prior	Australia	Melbourne Cricket Ground, Melbourne, Australia	26 December 2010
2	6	Matt Prior	South Africa	Lord's, London, England	16 August 2012
2	6	Jonny Bairstow	South Africa	Wanderers Stadium, Johannesburg, South Africa	14 January 2016
Last updated: 30 July 2018

==== Most dismissals in a series ====
Brad Haddin holds the Test cricket record for the most dismissals taken by a wicket-keeper in a series. He took 29 catches during the 2013 Ashes series which broke the previous record held by fellow Australian Rod Marsh when he took 28 catches in the 1982–83 Ashes series. Jack Russell of England is equal third with 27 dismissals taken during the 1995–96 tour of South Africa.

Rank	Dismissals	Player	Matches	Innings	Series
1	27	Jack Russell	5	7	English cricket team in South Africa in 1995–96
2	24	Alan Knott	6	12	1970–71 Ashes series
2	24	Jonny Bairstow	5	10	2023 Ashes series
4	23	Alec Stewart	5	8	South African cricket team in England in 1998
4	23	Matt Prior	5	10	2010–11 Ashes series
4	23	Alec Stewart	6	10	1997 Ashes series
4	23	Alan Knott	6	12	1974–75 Ashes series
Last updated: 2 September 2024

=== Fielding records ===
==== Most career catches ====
Caught is one of the nine methods a batsman can be dismissed in cricket. (Note: In 2017, The Laws of Cricket were amended, reducing the methods of dismissals from ten to nine, with handled the ball now covered as part of obstructing the field.) A fair catch is defined as a fielder catching the ball, from a legal delivery, fully within the field of play without it bouncing when the ball has touched the striker's bat or glove holding the bat. The majority of catches are caught in the slips, located behind the batsman, next to the wicket-keeper, on the off side of the field. Most slip fielders are top order batsmen. Joe Root holds the overall record for the most catches in Test cricket by a non-wicket-keeper.

Rank	Catches	Player	Matches	Period
1	220 ♠	Joe Root †	169	2012–2026
2	175	Alastair Cook	161	2006–2018
3	121	Andrew Strauss	100	2004–2012
4	120	Ian Botham	102	1977–1992
4	120	Colin Cowdrey	114	1954–1975
Last updated: 12 September 2026

==== Most catches in a series ====
The 1920–21 Ashes series, in which Australia whitewashed England 5–0 for the first time, saw the record set for the most catches taken by a non-wicket-keeper in a Test series. Australian all-rounder Jack Gregory took 15 catches in the series as well as 23 wickets. Greg Chappell and KL Rahul are joint second behind Gregory with 14 catches taken during the 1974–75 Ashes series and the 2018 India tour of England respectively. The same series saw Alastair Cook become the highest placed England player in equal fourth with 13 catches taken alongside Bob Simpson, Brian Lara and Rahul Dravid.

Rank	Catches	Player	Matches	Innings	Series
1	13	Alastair Cook	5	10	Indian cricket team in England in 2018
2	12	Len Braund	5	10	1901–02 Ashes series
2	12	Wally Hammond	5	9	1934 Ashes series
2	12	Jack Ikin	3	6	South African cricket team in England in 1951
2	12	Tony Greig	6	12	1974–75 Ashes series
2	12	Ian Botham	6	12	1981 Ashes series
2	12	Ben Stokes	4	8	English cricket team in South Africa in 2019–20
Last updated: 2 September 2024

=== Other records ===
==== Most career matches ====
India's Sachin Tendulkar holds the record for the most Test matches played with 200, with James Anderson in second with 188 caps. Anderson is one of 17 cricketers to have played 100 Tests for England.

Rank	Matches	Player	Period
1	188	James Anderson	2003–2024
2	169	Joe Root†	2012–2026
3	167	Stuart Broad	2007–2023
4	161	Alastair Cook	2006–2018
5	133	Alec Stewart	1990–2003
Last updated: 12 September 2026

==== Most consecutive career matches ====
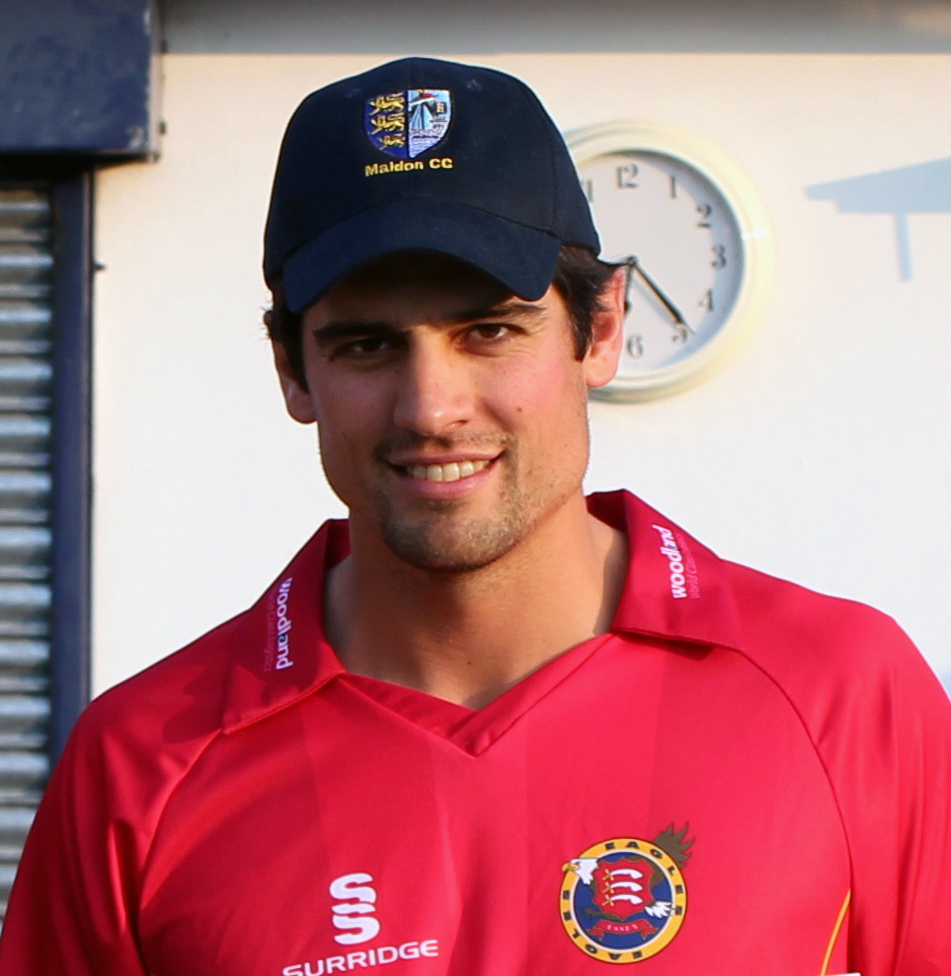
Alastair Cook, pictured in 2016, holds the record for the consecutive career matches in Test cricket with 159.

Former English captain Alastair Cook holds the record for the most consecutive Test matches played with 159. Cook equalled the previous record of 153, set by Australia's Allan Border, during the first Test of the two-match series against Pakistan in May 2018 and broke it by playing in the second Test of the same series.

Rank	Matches	Player	Period
1	159 ♠	Alastair Cook	2006–2018
2	77	Joe Root	2014–2020
2	77*	Joe Root	2020–2026
4	65	Ian Botham	1978–1984
4	65	Alan Knott	1971–1977
Last updated: 30 August 2026

==== Most matches as captain ====
Graeme Smith, who led the South African cricket team from 2003 to 2014, holds the record for the most matches played as captain in Test cricket, with 109. Current England captain Joe Root is currently joint-sixth on the list.

Rank	Matches	Player	Period
1	68†	Joe Root	2017–2026
2	59	Alastair Cook	2010–2016
3	54	Michael Atherton	1993–2001
4	51	Michael Vaughan	2003–2008
5	50	Andrew Strauss	2006–2012
Last updated: 12 September 2026

==== Youngest players ====
The youngest player to play in a Test match is claimed to be Hasan Raza at the age of 14 years and 227 days. Making his debut for Pakistan against Zimbabwe on 24 October 1996, there is some doubt as to the validity of Raza's age at the time. The youngest cricketer to play Test cricket for England was Rehan Ahmed who was 18 years and 126 days old when he debuted in the third Test of the series against Pakistan in December 2022.

Rank	Age	Player	Opposition	Venue	Date
1	18 years and 126 days	Rehan Ahmed	Pakistan	National Stadium, Karachi, Pakistan	17 December 2022
2	18 years and 149 days	Brian Close	New Zealand	Old Trafford, Manchester, England	23 July 1949
3	19 years and 32 days	Jack Crawford	South Africa	Old Wanderers, Johannesburg, South Africa	2 January 1906
4	19 years and 83 days	Denis Compton	New Zealand	The Oval, London, England	14 August 1937
5	19 years and 269 days	Ben Hollioake	Australia	Trent Bridge, Nottingham, England	7 August 1997
Last updated: 9 January 2023

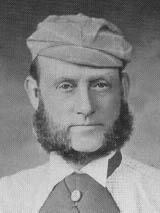
James Southerton is the fifth oldest cricketer to play in a Test match and was the oldest to make his debut.

==== Oldest players on debut ====
At 49 years and 119 days, James Southerton of England, playing in the very first Test match in March 1877, is the oldest player to make his debut in Test cricket. Second on the list is Miran Bakhsh of Pakistan who at 47 years and 284 days made his debut against India in 1955.

Rank	Age	Player	Opposition	Venue	Date
1	49 years and 119 days ♠	James Southerton	Australia	Melbourne Cricket Ground, Melbourne, Australia	15 March 1877
2	41 years and 337 days	Rockley Wilson	Australia	Sydney Cricket Ground, Sydney, Australia	25 February 1921
3	40 years and 216 days	Septimus Kinneir	Australia	Sydney Cricket Ground, Sydney, Australia	15 December 1911
4	40 years and 110 days	Harry Lee	South Africa	Old Wanderers, Johannesburg, South Africa	13 February 1931
5	39 years and 360 days	Arthur Wood	Australia	The Oval, London, England	20 August 1938
Last updated: 30 July 2018

==== Oldest players ====
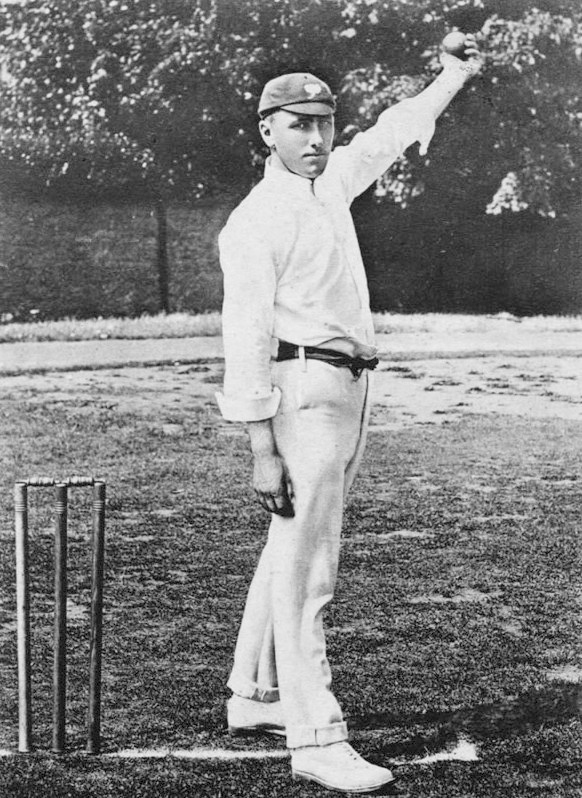
Wilfred Rhodes, pictured here aged 25, is the oldest cricketer to ever in play in a Test match at the age of 52.

England all-rounder Wilfred Rhodes is the oldest player to appear in a Test match. Playing in the fourth Test against the West Indies in 1930 at Sabina Park, in Kingston, Jamaica, he was aged 52 years and 165 days on the final day's play. The second-oldest Test player is Bert Ironmonger who was aged 50 years and 327 days when he represented Australia for the final time in the fifth Test of the 1932–33 Ashes series at the Sydney Cricket Ground.

Rank	Age	Player	Opposition	Venue	Date
1	52 years and 165 days ♠	Wilfred Rhodes	West Indies	Sabina Park, Kingston, Jamaica	3 April 1930
2	50 years and 320 days	W. G. Grace	Australia	Trent Bridge, Nottingham, England	1 June 1899
3	50 years and 303 days	George Gunn	West Indies	Sabina Park, Kingston, Jamaica	3 April 1930
4	49 years and 139 days	James Southerton	Australia	Melbourne Cricket Ground, Melbourne, Australia	31 March 1877
5	47 years and 249 days	Jack Hobbs	Australia	The Oval, London, England	16 August 1930
Last updated: 30 July 2018

== Partnership records ==
=== Highest partnerships by wicket ===
In cricket, two batsmen are always present at the crease batting together in a partnership. This partnership will continue until one of them is dismissed, retires or the innings comes to a close.A wicket partnership describes the number of runs scored before each wicket falls. The first wicket partnership is between the opening batsmen and continues until the first wicket falls. The second wicket partnership then commences between the not out batsman and the number three batsman. This partnership continues until the second wicket falls. The third wicket partnership then commences between the not out batsman and the new batsman. This continues down to the tenth wicket partnership. When the tenth wicket has fallen, there is no batsman left to partner so the innings is closed.

English batsmen hold four Test wicket partnerships records, all set since 2010. Joe Root and Harry Brook scored 454 for the fourth wicket against Pakistan at Multan in 2024. Ben Stokes and Jonny Bairstow came together in the second Test of the 2015–16 series against South Africa at Newlands Cricket Ground and put together a sixth wicket partnership of 399 runs. The pair of Jonathan Trott and Stuart Broad set the highest eighth wicket partnership of 332 runs at Lord's in August 2010 against Pakistan. Finally, the tenth wicket partnership of 198 was made by Joe Root and James Anderson in the first Test against India at Trent Bridge in July 2014.

Wicket	Runs	First batsman	Second batsman	Opposition	Venue	Date
1st wicket	359	Len Hutton	Cyril Washbrook	South Africa	Ellis Park Stadium, Johannesburg, South Africa	27 December 1948
2nd wicket	382	Len Hutton	Maurice Leyland	Australia	The Oval, London, England	20 August 1938
3rd wicket	370	Bill Edrich	Denis Compton	South Africa	Lord's, London, England	21 June 1947
4th wicket	454 ♠	Joe Root	Harry Brook	Pakistan	Multan Cricket Stadium, Multan, Pakistan	7 October 2024
5th wicket	359	Zak Crawley	Jos Buttler	Pakistan	Rose Bowl, Southampton, England	21 August 2020
6th wicket	399 ♠	Ben Stokes	Jonny Bairstow	South Africa	Newlands Cricket Ground, Cape Town, South Africa	2 January 2016
7th wicket	241	Jonny Bairstow	Jamie Overton	New Zealand	Headingley, Yorkshire, England	23 June 2022
8th wicket	332 ♠	Jonathan Trott	Stuart Broad	Pakistan	Lord's, London, England	26 August 2010
9th wicket	163*	Colin Cowdrey	Alan Smith	New Zealand	Basin Reserve, Wellington, New Zealand	1 March 1963
10th wicket	198 ♠	Joe Root	James Anderson	India	Trent Bridge, Nottingham, England	9 July 2014
Last updated: 10 October 2024

=== Highest partnerships by runs ===
The highest Test partnership by runs for any wicket is held by the Sri Lankan pairing of Kumar Sangakkara and Mahela Jayawardene who put together a third wicket partnership of 624 runs during the first Test against South Africa in July 2006. This broke the record of 576 runs set by their compatriots Sanath Jayasuriya and Roshan Mahanama against India in 1997. New Zealand's Andrew Jones and Martin Crowe hold the third-highest Test partnership with 467 made in 1991 against Sri Lanka. The English pairing of Joe Root and Harry Brook together scored 454 for the fourth wicket against Pakistan in 2024 to place themselves fourth on the list.

Wicket	Runs	First batsman	Second batsman	Opposition	Venue	Date
4th wicket	454	Joe Root	Harry Brook	Pakistan	Multan Cricket Stadium, Multan, Pakistan	7 October 2024
4th wicket	411	Peter May	Colin Cowdrey	West Indies	Edgbaston, Birmingham, England	30 May 1957
6th wicket	399	Ben Stokes	Jonny Bairstow	South Africa	Newlands Cricket Ground, Cape Town, South Africa	2 January 2016
2nd wicket	382	Len Hutton	Maurice Leyland	Australia	The Oval, London, England	20 August 1938
3rd wicket	370	Bill Edrich	Denis Compton	South Africa	Lord's, London, England	21 June 1947
Last updated: 10 October 2024

== Umpiring records ==
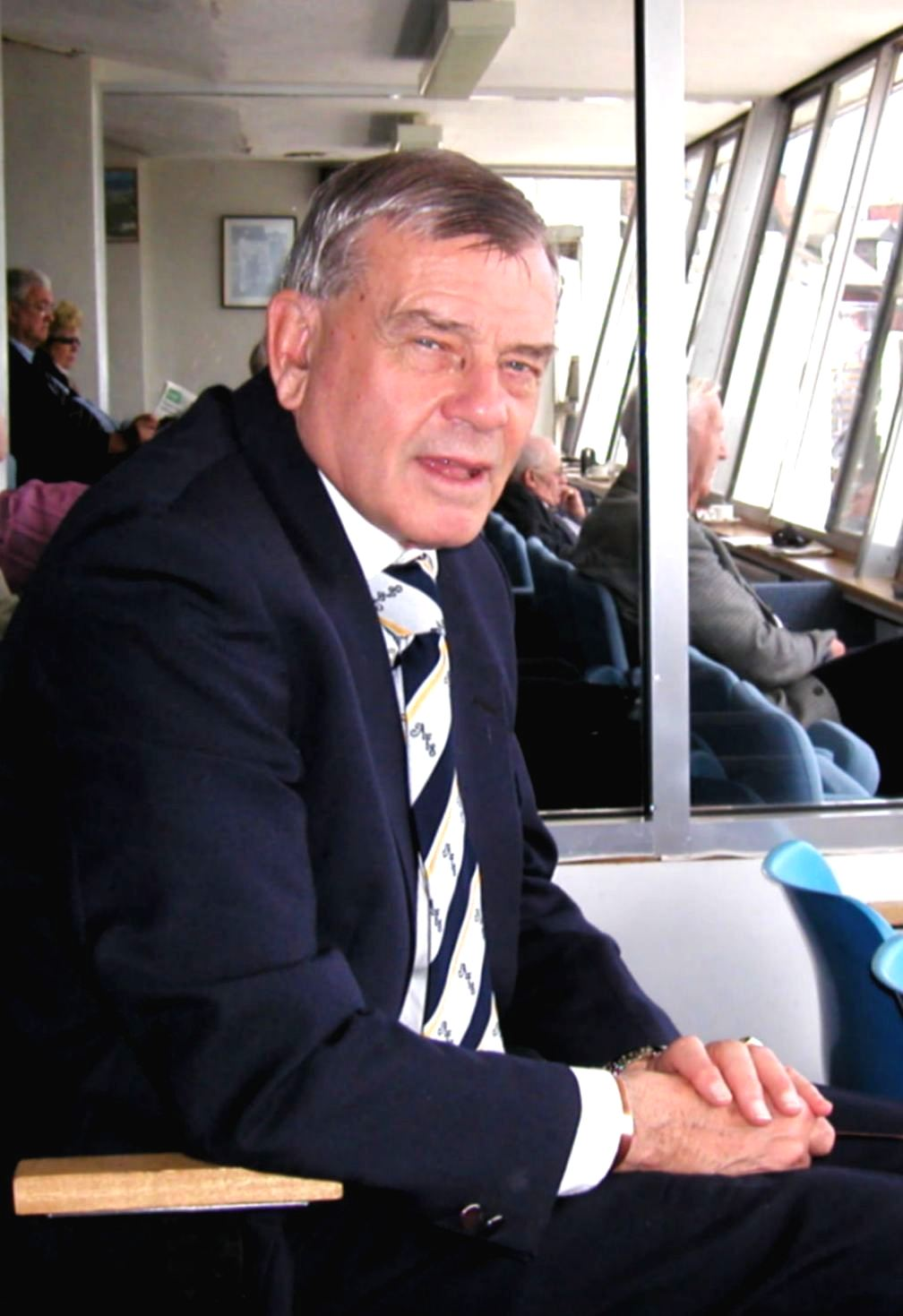
Dickie Bird stood as an umpire in 66 matches, a former Test record, and is now the fifth most experienced English umpire behind David Shepherd, Richard Kettleborough, Ian Gould and Richard Illingworth.

=== Most matches umpired ===
An umpire in cricket is a person who officiates the match according to the Laws of Cricket. Two umpires adjudicate the match on the field, whilst a third umpire has access to video replays, and a fourth umpire looks after the match balls and other duties. The records below are only for on-field umpires.

Aleem Dar of Pakistan holds the record for the most Test matches umpired with 145. The most experienced English umpire is Richard Kettleborough, who is currently fifth on the list.

Rank	Matches	Umpire	Period
1	98	Richard Kettleborough†	2008–2026
2	92	David Shepherd	1985–2005
3	84	Richard Illingworth†	2010–2026
4	74	Ian Gould	2006–2019
5	66	Dickie Bird	1973–1996
Last updated: 21 August 2026
