= Indian cricket team in England in 2025 =

International cricket tour

- Anderson–Tendulkar Trophy
	England	India
- Dates: 20 June – 4 August 2025
Captains	Ben Stokes (Note: Ollie Pope captained England in the 5th Test.)	Shubman Gill

Test series
- Result: 5-match series drawn 2–2
Most runs	Joe Root (537)	Shubman Gill (754)
Most wickets	Josh Tongue (19)	Mohammed Siraj (23)
- Player of the series: Harry Brook (Eng); Shubman Gill (Ind)

The India cricket team toured England from June to August 2025 to play the England cricket team. The tour consisted of five Test matches. The series formed part of the 2025–2027 ICC World Test Championship. In August 2024, the England and Wales Cricket Board (ECB) confirmed the fixtures for the tour, as a part of the 2025 home international season.

The Anderson–Tendulkar Trophy, honouring James Anderson and Sachin Tendulkar, was awarded to the winner of the series. Initiated by Sachin Tendulkar, with the support of the BCCI and ECB, the Pataudi Medal of Excellence was a newly introduced award for the winning captain of the Test series.

== Squads ==
England	India
Ben Stokes (c); Ollie Pope (vc); Jofra Archer; Gus Atkinson; Shoaib Bashir; Jacob Bethell; Harry Brook; Brydon Carse; Sam Cook; Zak Crawley; Liam Dawson; Ben Duckett; Jamie Overton; Joe Root; Jamie Smith (wk); Josh Tongue; Chris Woakes	Shubman Gill (c); Rishabh Pant (vc, wk); Jasprit Bumrah; Akash Deep; Abhimanyu Easwaran; Ravindra Jadeja; Narayan Jagadeesan (wk); Yashasvi Jaiswal; Dhruv Jurel (wk); Anshul Kamboj; Prasidh Krishna; Karun Nair; KL Rahul; Harshit Rana; Nitish Kumar Reddy; Arshdeep Singh; Mohammed Siraj; Sai Sudharsan; Washington Sundar; Shardul Thakur; Kuldeep Yadav

On 17 June, Harshit Rana was added into the Indian squad for the first Test. Harshit Rana was released from the Indian squad, and did not travel with India for the second Test. On 20 July, Anshul Kamboj was added into the squad as a backup pacer. On 21 July, Nitish Kumar Reddy was ruled out of the remainder match due to an injury in his left knee and Arshdeep Singh was ruled out of the fourth test due to an injury to his left thumb. On 22 July, Akash Deep was ruled out of the fourth test due to a groin injury. During the fourth Test, Rishabh Pant fractured his foot and was ruled out of the series, later Narayan Jagadeesan was named as his replacement.

On 26 June, Jofra Archer was added into the England squad for the second Test but was not included for the 5th test. On 6 July, Gus Atkinson was added to the squad for the third Test. On 14 July, Shoaib Bashir was ruled out of the remainder of the series due to sustaining a fracture to a finger in his left hand, with Liam Dawson named as his replacement. Meanwhile Sam Cook and Jamie Overton were released to their respective counties to play in the County Championship. However, later Overton was recalled back in the squad for the fifth Test. On 30 July, Ben Stokes was ruled out of the fifth Test due to a right shoulder injury, and Ollie Pope named as captain.

== Tour matches ==
India A tour of England 2025
- Part of India tour of England 2025
- Date: 30 May – 9 June 2025
- Location: England
- Result: 2 match series drawn 0–0
Teams
- England Lions: India A
Captains
- James Rew: Abhimanyu Easwaran
Most runs
- Tom Haines (232): Karun Nair (259)
Most wickets
- Chris Woakes (5) George Hill (5): Anshul Kamboj (5)

=== Squads ===
England Lions	India A
James Rew (c, wk); Farhan Ahmed; Rehan Ahmed; Sonny Baker; Jordan Cox (wk); Ajeet Singh Dale; Rocky Flintoff; Emilio Gay; Tom Haines; George Hill; Josh Hull; Eddie Jack; Ben McKinney; Dan Mousley; Chris Woakes	Abhimanyu Easwaran (c); Dhruv Jurel (vc, wk); Khaleel Ahmed; Akash Deep; Tushar Deshpande; Harsh Dubey; Ruturaj Gaikwad; Yashasvi Jaiswal; Anshul Kamboj; Sarfaraz Khan; Ishan Kishan (wk); Tanush Kotian; Mukesh Kumar; Karun Nair; KL Rahul; Harshit Rana; Nitish Kumar Reddy; Manav Suthar; Shardul Thakur

=== 1st unofficial Test ===
30 May – 2 June 2025
Scorecard

India A	v	England Lions
557 (125.1 overs); Karun Nair 204 (281); Josh Hull 3/72 (20 overs)		587 (145.5 overs); Tom Haines 171 (279); Mukesh Kumar 3/92 (25 overs)
241/2 (41 overs); Abhimanyu Easwaran 68 (87); Rehan Ahmed 2/41 (12 overs)

Match drawn
St Lawrence Ground, Canterbury
Umpires: Tom Lungley (Eng) and James Middlebrook (Eng)

- England Lions won the toss and elected to field.
- Eddie Jack (England Lions) made his first-class debut.
- Dan Mousley (England Lions) scored his maiden century in first-class cricket.

=== 2nd unofficial Test ===
6–9 June 2025
Scorecard

India A	v	England Lions
348 (89.3 overs); KL Rahul 116 (168); Chris Woakes 3/60 (20 overs)		327 (89 overs); Emilio Gay 71 (117); Khaleel Ahmed 4/70 (19 overs)
417/7d (92 overs); Tanush Kotian 90* (108); George Hill 3/64 (20 overs)		32/3 (11 overs); Ben McKinney 16* (30); Anshul Kamboj 2/6 (3 overs)

Match drawn
County Ground, Northampton
Umpires: David Millns (Eng) and Surendiran Shanmugam (Eng)

- England Lions won the toss and elected to field.

== Test series ==
=== 1st Test ===
20–24 June 2025
Scorecard

India	v	England
471 (113 overs); Shubman Gill 147 (227); Ben Stokes 4/66 (20 overs)		465 (100.4 overs); Ollie Pope 106 (137); Jasprit Bumrah 5/83 (24.4 overs)
364 (96 overs); KL Rahul 137 (247); Josh Tongue 3/72 (18 overs)		373/5 (82 overs); Ben Duckett 149 (170); Shardul Thakur 2/51 (10 overs)

England won by 5 wickets
Headingley, Leeds
Umpires: Chris Gaffaney (NZ) and Paul Reiffel (Aus)
Player of the match: Ben Duckett (Eng)

- England won the toss and elected to field.
- Sai Sudharsan (Ind) made his Test debut.
- Shubman Gill captained India for the first time in Tests.
- Shubman Gill (Ind) scored his 2,000th run in Tests.
- Rishabh Pant (Ind) scored his 3,000th run in Tests, becoming the leading Asian wicketkeeper in SENA countries and the Indian wicketkeeper with the most Test centuries (7), both surpassing MS Dhoni and most sixes (62) by an Indian in the WTC, surpassing Rohit Sharma.
- Jasprit Bumrah (Ind) held the record for the highest number of Test wickets in SENA nations by any Asian bowler and equalled Kapil Dev’s away five-wicket haul tally.
- Chris Woakes (Eng) scored his 2,000th run in Tests.
- KL Rahul (Ind) completed 1,000 Test runs against England matched the second-most fifty-plus scores by an Indian opener in SENA Tests.
- Rishabh Pant became the first Indian wicketkeeper to score centuries in both innings of a Test.
- Five centuries were scored by Indian batsmen for the first time in a single Test. It was also the first occurrence of the losing team scoring five centuries in a Test.
- Ben Stokes (Eng) became the third England captain to claim 50 wickets in Test cricket .
- World Test Championship points: England 12, India 0.

=== 2nd Test ===
2–6 July 2025
Scorecard

India	v	England
587 (151 overs); Shubman Gill 269 (387); Shoaib Bashir 3/167 (45 overs)		407 (89.3 overs); Jamie Smith 184* (207); Mohammed Siraj 6/70 (19.3 overs)
427/6d (83 overs); Shubman Gill 161 (162); Josh Tongue 2/93 (15 overs)		271 (68.1 overs); Jamie Smith 88 (99); Akash Deep 6/99 (21.1 overs)

India won by 336 runs
Edgbaston, Birmingham
Umpires: Chris Gaffaney (NZ) and Sharfuddoula (Ban)
Player of the match: Shubman Gill (Ind)

- England won the toss and elected to field.
- Shubman Gill (Ind) scored his maiden double century in Tests. He also broke Virat Kohli's (254) record of highest individual score by an Indian captain in Tests. This score combined with his century in the second innings made the second-highest aggregate score ever.
- Ravindra Jadeja became the first-ever player to score 2,000 runs and take 100 wickets in WTC history.
- Jamie Smith (Eng) broke Alec Stewart's record (173) for the highest score by an English wicket-keeper.
- Yashasvi Jaiswal (Ind) scored his 2,000th run in Tests.
- Akash Deep (Ind) took his first five-wicket haul and ten-wicket haul in Tests.
- This was India's first ever Test win at this venue. It also became the first Asian team to win at this venue.
- This was also India's biggest Test victory by margin of runs away from home.
- World Test Championship points: India 12, England 0.

=== 3rd Test ===
10–14 July 2025
Scorecard

England	v	India
387 (112.3 overs); Joe Root 104 (199); Jasprit Bumrah 5/74 (27 overs)		387 (119.2 overs); KL Rahul 100 (177); Chris Woakes 3/84 (27 overs)
192 (62.1 overs); Joe Root 40 (96); Washington Sundar 4/22 (12.1 overs)		170 (74.5 overs); Ravindra Jadeja 61* (181); Ben Stokes 3/48 (24 overs)

England won by 22 runs
Lord's, London
Umpires: Paul Reiffel (Aus) and Sharfuddoula (Ban)
Player of the match: Ben Stokes (Eng)

- England won the toss and elected to bat.
- Joe Root (Eng) became the first ever cricketer to complete 3,000 Test runs against India.
- Jamie Smith (Eng) became the joint-fastest wicket-keeper-batter to complete 1,000 runs in Tests.
- World Test Championship points: England 10, India 0. (Note: England were deducted a total of 2 points for maintaining a slow over-rate.)

=== 4th Test ===
23–27 July 2025
Scorecard

India	v	England
358 (114.1 overs); Sai Sudharsan 61 (151); Ben Stokes 5/72 (24 overs)		669 (157.1 overs); Joe Root 150 (248); Ravindra Jadeja 4/143 (37.1 overs)
425/4 (143 overs); Ravindra Jadeja 107* (185); Chris Woakes 2/67 (23 overs)

Match drawn
Old Trafford, Manchester
Umpires: Ahsan Raza (Pak) and Rod Tucker (Aus)
Player of the match: Ben Stokes (Eng)

- England won the toss and elected to field.
- Anshul Kamboj (Ind) made his Test debut.
- Yashasvi Jaiswal (Ind) completed 1,000 Test runs against England.
- KL Rahul, Rishabh Pant and Ravindra Jadeja (Ind) all crossed 1,000 runs in England in Tests. Thus, Pant also became the first ever visiting wicket-keeper to do so in England.
- Joe Root (Eng) surpassed Ricky Ponting (Aus) to become the second highest run-scorer of all time in Tests.
- Jasprit Bumrah (Ind) took his 50th wicket in England.
- Ben Stokes (Eng) became the first English captain to score a century and take a five-wicket haul in the same Test match. He also scored his 7,000th run in Tests.
- This was England's highest total at this venue.
- Shubman Gill (Ind) surpassed Virat Kohli's (692) record of scoring most runs by an Asian batter in a Test series played in SENA countries.
- Washington Sundar (Ind) scored his maiden century in Tests.
- World Test Championship points: England 4, India 4.

=== 5th Test ===
31 July – 4 August 2025
Scorecard

India	v	England
224 (69.4 overs); Karun Nair 57 (109); Gus Atkinson 5/33 (21.4 overs)		247 (51.2 overs); Zak Crawley 64 (57); Prasidh Krishna 4/62 (16 overs)
396 (88 overs); Yashasvi Jaiswal 118 (164); Josh Tongue 5/125 (30 overs)		367 (85.1 overs); Harry Brook 111 (98); Mohammed Siraj 5/104 (30.1 overs)

India won by 6 runs
The Oval, London
Umpires: Kumar Dharmasena (SL) and Ahsan Raza (Pak)
Player of the match: Mohammed Siraj (Ind)

- England won the toss and elected to field.
- This was India's lowest Test victory by margin of runs.
- Chris Woakes (Eng) played his last Test match.
- World Test Championship points: India 12, England 0.

== Statistics ==
=== Most runs ===
Runs	Batter	Mat	Inns	NO	Average	HS	100s	50s
754	(India) Shubman Gill	5	10	0	75.40	269	4	0
537	(England) Joe Root	5	9	1	67.12	150	3	1
532	(India) KL Rahul	5	10	0	53.20	137	2	2
516	(India) Ravindra Jadeja	5	10	4	86.00	107*	1	5
481	(England) Harry Brook	5	9	0	53.44	158	2	2
Source: Cricinfo

=== Most wickets ===
Wtks	Bowler	Mat	Inns	Runs	Overs	BBI	Ave	5WI
23	(India) Mohammed Siraj	5	9	746	185.3	6/70	32.43	2
19	(England) Josh Tongue	3	6	552	127.0	5/125	29.05	1
17	(England) Ben Stokes	4	8	429	140.0	5/72	25.23	1
14	(India) Jasprit Bumrah	3	5	364	119.4	5/74	26.00	2
14	(India) Prasidh Krishna	3	6	519	105.0	4/62	37.07	0
Source: Cricinfo
