= English cricket team in India in 2023–24 =

International cricket tour in 2024

English cricket team in India in 2024
	India	England
- Dates: 25 January – 11 March 2024
Captains	Rohit Sharma	Ben Stokes

Test series
- Result: India won the 5-match series 4–1
Most runs	Yashasvi Jaiswal (712)	Zak Crawley (407)
Most wickets	Ravichandran Ashwin (26)	Tom Hartley (22)
- Player of the series: Yashasvi Jaiswal (Ind)

The England cricket team toured India from January to March 2024 to play five Test matches. The Test series formed part of the 2023–2025 ICC World Test Championship. The teams competed for the Anthony de Mello Trophy. The series overlapped with the first-class series between India A and England Lions, which took place in January and February 2024.

In the first Test, England recovered from a first innings deficit of 190 to win by 28 runs. Ollie Pope scored 196 in England's second innings, and then debutant Tom Hartley took 7/62 to seal the win.

In the second Test, India posted 396 in their first innings. However, a strong counter from England reduced the deficit to 143. Aided by a century from Shubman Gill, India posted a 399 run lead. England saw initial success in their second innings, but a combined bowling attack by Jasprit Bumrah and Ravichandran Ashwin saw India win by 106 runs, and level the series at 1-1. Yashasvi Jaiswal scored 209, a career-best performance, in India's first innings.

In the third Test, India posted 445 in their first innings. A good innings from Ben Duckett helped England reduce the deficit to 126. In excellent form, Yashasvi Jaiswal scored 214* (another career best performance) to help India post a 557 run lead. England were all out for 122, majorly due to a 5 wicket haul by Ravindra Jadeja. India won by 434 runs (the biggest ever Indian win in terms of runs), and took a lead in the series at 2–1.

The fourth Test saw a century from Joe Root in the first innings, but England were halted at 353 with Ravindra Jadeja taking 4 wickets. India could not close the lead set by England despite Dhruv Jurel scoring 90 runs and were halted by Shoaib Bashir's maiden 5 wicket haul. England set a 192 run lead in their second innings after being curtailed by Ravichandran Ashwin's 5 wicket haul. A 72 run partnership by Dhruv Jurel and Shubman Gill helped India secure the series win.

In the final record breaking test, India bowled out England early before Rohit and Gill both scored centuries, setting a target of 477. The 100th test of both Ashwin and Bairstow, this match saw for the first time ever, a test series having more than 100 sixes hit. India eventually bowled England out again to clinch an innings win.

== Background ==
In the 131 Tests played between the two teams before the series, England had won and drawn 50 each, and lost 31. In India, they had won 14 and lost 22, while 28 matches ended in draws. In a total of 16 series played in India between the two sides, the hosts had won eight and lost five. England were the last visiting side to win a Test series in India, in 2012–13. The last Test series between the two sides, played in England, and interrupted by COVID-19, had ended in a 2–2 draw. However, India boasted an enviable record playing at home, having won 36 of the 46 Tests played over the previous decade. India's previous Test outing was a 1–1 draw away from home against South Africa, while England last featured in a 2–2 draw in the Ashes at home. Ahead of the series, England and India were ranked number three and two in the ICC Men's Test Team Rankings.

Going into the series, England had been playing the Bazball style of cricket for over two years. They had won 13 of the 18 Tests played in this fashion. The away India series was touted by the English media as its ultimate test. The Telegraph wrote: "India will be the ultimate stress test of the first rule of Bazball, which is to be endlessly positive." Captain Ben Stokes had stated that India was the "hardest place to come and win a game, let alone a series". Their top-order batter Ollie Pope had earlier stated that England would use "Bazball as hard as ever in India". England's coach Brendon McCullum stated that "India is the best in their own condition. It is going to be a good challenge for us. If we have success, then fabulous; if we don't, then I know we will go down in the style that we want to go down." However, former English Test captain Michael Vaughan warned that the English side might get "absolutely destroyed" against an Indian side that has superb spinners. Former batter Kevin Pietersen, part of the team that won there in 2012–13, said that England's performance would be dictated by how their spinners perform. He stated, "It's how England's spinners bowl. Don't worry about Bazball. I'm sure they'll get their runs because it's the most beautiful place to bat. In the first innings, it's a great place to bat. If they get enough runs, [it's] all about how the spinners bowl."

The Indian media too speculated the viability and the potential success of Bazball on Indian soil. The Hindu wrote that for Bazball to work in India "requires sound technique rather than quick reflexes. It will all depend on how much the England batters allow these two Indian spinners (Ravichandran Ashwin and Ravindra Jadeja) to take up space in their heads. England need to bat long and positively to put pressure on India. It is their best chance."

Former English captain Michael Atherton felt that India were favorites to win the series, while former paceman Steve Harmison felt the "underprepared" English side "deserve[d] to get beat 5–0". Criticism was directed at the English preparation after the squad decided against playing a tour game in India, instead holding a 11-day training camp in Abu Dhabi.

== Squads ==
India	England
Rohit Sharma (c); Jasprit Bumrah (vc); Ravichandran Ashwin; KS Bharat (wk); Akash Deep; Shubman Gill; Shreyas Iyer; Ravindra Jadeja; Yashasvi Jaiswal; Dhruv Jurel (wk); Avesh Khan; Sarfaraz Khan; ~~Virat Kohli~~; Mukesh Kumar; Saurabh Kumar; Devdutt Padikkal; Axar Patel; Rajat Patidar; KL Rahul; Mohammed Siraj; Washington Sundar; Kuldeep Yadav	Ben Stokes (c); Ollie Pope (vc); Rehan Ahmed; James Anderson; Gus Atkinson; Jonny Bairstow (wk); Shoaib Bashir; ~~Harry Brook~~; Zak Crawley; Ben Duckett; Ben Foakes (wk); Tom Hartley; Dan Lawrence; Jack Leach; Ollie Robinson; Joe Root; Mark Wood

The England squad for the tour was announced by the England Cricket Board on 11 December 2023. Three uncapped players made the squad — Surrey paceman Gus Atkinson and off spinners Tom Hartley (Lancashire) and Shoaib Bashir (Somerset). On 21 January 2024, Harry Brook withdrew from the tour for personal reasons and was replaced in the squad by Dan Lawrence. The squad arrived in India the following day after holding a training camp in Abu Dhabi. Bashir had returned home from Abu Dhabi in order to resolve a visa delay that prevented him from travelling to India with the rest of the squad. However, he joined the squad in Hyderabad after belatedly receiving his visa, a few days later.

India's squad for the first two Tests of the series was announced on 12 January 2024. KS Bharat and Dhruv Jurel were named in the squad as wicketkeeper-batsmen. Mohammed Shami, still recovering from the injury he sustained during the World Cup the previous year, was not named. Virat Kohli withdrew from the first two Tests for personal reasons on 22 January; Rajat Patidar was named his replacement.

On 29 January, after the First Test, injured KL Rahul and Ravindra Jadeja were ruled out of the Second, and Sarfaraz Khan, Saurabh Kumar and Washington Sundar were added to India's squad. Two days later, England's Jack Leach was ruled out of the Second Test with a bruised knee. He was later ruled out of the series. Rahul and Jadeja were named in the squad for the final three matches, subject to medical clearances. Shreyas Iyer and Avesh Khan were dropped, Kohli remained unavailable for selection, and Akash Deep earned his first Test call-up. An injured Rahul was replaced by Devdutt Padikkal in India's squad. Khan and Jurel made their debut in the Third Test. For the fourth Test, Jasprit Bumrah was rested, while Rahul still remained unavailable for selection.

On 23 February 2024, England's Rehan Ahmed was ruled out from the last two Tests for personal reasons

== Test series ==
=== 1st Test ===
25–28 January 2024
Scorecard

England	v	India
246 (64.3 overs); Ben Stokes 70 (88); Ravichandran Ashwin 3/68 (21 overs)		436 (121 overs); Ravindra Jadeja 87 (180); Joe Root 4/79 (29 overs)
420 (102.1 overs); Ollie Pope 196 (278); Jasprit Bumrah 4/41 (16.1 overs)		202 (69.2 overs); Rohit Sharma 39 (58); Tom Hartley 7/62 (26.2 overs)

England won by 28 runs
Rajiv Gandhi International Cricket Stadium, Hyderabad
Umpires: Chris Gaffaney (NZ) and Paul Reiffel (Aus)
Player of the match: Ollie Pope (Eng)

- England won the toss and elected to bat.
- KL Rahul (Ind) played in his 50th Test.
- Tom Hartley (Eng) made his Test debut and took his first five-wicket haul in Tests.
- This was India's first Test defeat at this venue.
- World Test Championship points: England 12, India 0.

=== 2nd Test ===
2–5 February 2024
Scorecard

India	v	England
396 (112 overs); Yashasvi Jaiswal 209 (290); James Anderson 3/47 (25 overs)		253 (55.5 overs); Zak Crawley 76 (78); Jasprit Bumrah 6/45 (15.5 overs)
255 (78.3 overs); Shubman Gill 104 (147); Tom Hartley 4/77 (27 overs)		292 (69.2 overs); Zak Crawley 73 (132); Jasprit Bumrah 3/46 (17.2 overs)

India won by 106 runs
Dr. Y. S. Rajashekar Reddy ACA–VDCA Cricket Stadium, Visakhapatnam
Umpires: Marais Erasmus (SA) and Chris Gaffaney (NZ)
Player of the match: Jasprit Bumrah (Ind)

- India won the toss and elected to bat.
- Rajat Patidar (Ind) and Shoaib Bashir (Eng) both made their Test debuts.
- Yashasvi Jaiswal (Ind) scored his first double hundred in Tests.
- Jasprit Bumrah (Ind) took his 150th wicket in Tests.
- World Test Championship points: India 12, England 0.

=== 3rd Test ===
15–18 February 2024
Scorecard

India	v	England
445 (130.5 overs); Rohit Sharma 131 (196); Mark Wood 4/114 (27.5 overs)		319 (71.1 overs); Ben Duckett 153 (151); Mohammed Siraj 4/84 (21.1 overs)
430/4d (98 overs); Yashasvi Jaiswal 214* (236); Tom Hartley 1/78 (23 overs)		122 (39.4 overs); Mark Wood 33 (15); Ravindra Jadeja 5/41 (12.4 overs)

India won by 434 runs
Niranjan Shah Stadium, Rajkot
Umpires: Kumar Dharmasena (SL) and Joel Wilson (WI)
Player of the match: Ravindra Jadeja (Ind)

- India won the toss and elected to bat.
- Dhruv Jurel and Sarfaraz Khan (Ind) both made their Test debuts.
- Ben Stokes (Eng) played in his 100th Test.
- Ravindra Jadeja (Ind) scored his 3,000th run in Tests.
- Ravichandran Ashwin surpassed Anil Kumble to become the fastest Indian bowler to pick up 500 wickets in Tests. He withdrew from the match after day two due to a family emergency, before rejoining at the start of the third session of play on day four.
- Yashasvi Jaiswal (Ind) equalled Wasim Akram's record for most sixes by a batter in a Test innings (12).
- This was India's largest win in Tests in terms of runs. It was also England's second largest defeat in Tests, and their largest since 1934.
- World Test Championship points: India 12, England 0.

=== 4th Test ===
23–26 February 2024
Scorecard

England	v	India
353 (104.5 overs); Joe Root 122* (274); Ravindra Jadeja 4/67 (32.5 overs)		307 (103.2 overs); Dhruv Jurel 90 (149); Shoaib Bashir 5/119 (44 overs)
145 (53.5 overs); Zak Crawley 60 (91); Ravichandran Ashwin 5/51 (15.5 overs)		192/5 (61 overs); Rohit Sharma 55 (81); Shoaib Bashir 3/79 (26 overs)

India won by 5 wickets
JSCA International Stadium Complex, Ranchi
Umpires: Kumar Dharmasena (SL) and Rod Tucker (Aus)
Player of the match: Dhruv Jurel (Ind)

- England won the toss and elected to bat.
- Akash Deep (Ind) made his Test debut.
- Shoaib Bashir (Eng) took his maiden five-wicket haul in Tests.
- Ravichandran Ashwin equalled Anil Kumble's record for the most five-wicket hauls by an Indian bowler in Tests (35).
- Rohit Sharma (Ind) scored his 4,000th run in Tests.
- World Test Championship points: India 12, England 0.

=== 5th Test ===
7–9 March 2024
Scorecard

England	v	India
218 (57.4 overs); Zak Crawley 79 (108); Kuldeep Yadav 5/72 (15 overs)		477 (124.1 overs); Shubman Gill 110 (150); Shoaib Bashir 5/173 (46.1 overs)
195 (48.1 overs); Joe Root 84 (128); Ravichandran Ashwin 5/77 (14 overs)

India won by an innings and 64 runs
Himachal Pradesh Cricket Association Stadium, Dharamshala
Umpires: Rod Tucker (Aus) and Joel Wilson (WI)
Player of the match: Kuldeep Yadav (Ind)

- England won the toss and elected to bat.
- Devdutt Padikkal (Ind) made his Test debut.
- Ravichandran Ashwin (Ind) and Jonny Bairstow (Eng) both played in their 100th Test.
- Kuldeep Yadav (Ind) took his 50th wicket in Tests.
- Jonny Bairstow (Eng) scored his 6,000th run in Tests.
- Yashasvi Jaiswal (Ind) broke Cheteshwar Pujara's record for the fastest to make 1,000 Test runs, in terms of matches played (9).
- James Anderson (Eng) became the first pacer and third bowler overall to pick 700 wickets in Tests.
- Ravichandran Ashwin claimed his 36th five-wicket haul, the most by an India bowler in Tests. He became the first player in Test cricket history to take a five-wicket haul in his hundredth test.
- This was the first time that a Test series had more than 100 sixes hit.
- India won a five match test series 4-1 after losing the first match, the first such instance in 112 years.
- World Test Championship points: India 12, England 0.
