= Shoaib Bashir =

English cricketer (born 2003)

Personal information
- Full name: Shoaib Bashir
- Born: 13 October 2003 (age 23); Chertsey, Surrey, England
- Nickname: Bash
- Height: 6 ft 4 in (193 cm)
- Batting: Right-handed
- Bowling: Right-arm off break
- Role: Bowler

International information
- National side: England (2024–present)
- Test debut (cap 713): 2 February 2024 v India
- Last Test: 25 June 2026 v New Zealand

Domestic team information
- Years: Team
- 2023–2025: Somerset (squad no. 13)
- 2024: → Worcestershire (on loan)
- 2025: → Glamorgan (on loan)
- 2026–: Derbyshire (squad no. 13)

Career statistics
Competition	Test	FC	LA	T20
Matches	21	50	10	7
Runs scored	106	303	12	0
Batting average	7.57	7.57	6.00	–
100s/50s	0/0	0/0	0/0	0/0
Top score	14	44*	7	0*
Balls bowled	4,427	9,610	415	102
Wickets	71	114	4	6
Bowling average	39.42	49.52	111.50	24.33
5 wickets in innings	4	4	0	0
10 wickets in match	0	0	0	0
Best bowling	6/81	6/81	1/46	3/26
Catches/stumpings	6/–	19/–	8/–	1/–
- Source: ESPNcricinfo, 27 September 2026

Shoaib Bashir (born 13 October 2003) is an English cricketer who plays for Derbyshire and England and previously represented Somerset. He is a right-handed batter and a right-arm off-break bowler. He made his first-class debut for Somerset against Essex on 11 June 2023. He made his T20 Blast debut for Somerset against Hampshire on 7 June 2023. He made his international test debut against India on 2 February 2024.

== Early and personal life ==
Bashir was born in Chertsey, grew up in Woking, Surrey, and attended Fullbrook School and Woking College. His uncle (Saj) was a wicket-keeper batsman for Guildford City Cricket Club and encouraged Bashir with his cricket career.

Bashir has Pakistani heritage and is a Muslim. His family roots lie in Mirpur, Azad Kashmir and he speaks the region's Pothwari dialect of Punjabi at home while also being conversant in Urdu.

== Domestic career ==
Prior to signing with Somerset in 2022, Bashir played club cricket for Guildford, age-group cricket with Surrey and Middlesex, and Minor Counties cricket for Berkshire. He spent the winter of 2022-2023 playing club cricket in Australia for the Lindfield District Cricket Club. Despite his height, he never tried seam bowling.

=== Somerset ===
In October 2022, Bashir was given a contract for the 2023 season by Somerset after impressing in Somerset Second-XI fixtures in which he took nine wickets at an average of just 14.11 with a best of 5 for 44 against Warwickshire Second XI.

He played warm-up games in red ball cricket prior to the start of the County Championship in April 2023, whilst continuing to play Second-XI matches for the county in the start of the 2023 season.

On 7 June 2023, he made his T20 Blast debut for Somerset against Hampshire. On 9 June 2023, he took his first wickets as Somerset beat Gloucestershire in the T20 Blast with Bashir claiming 3-26.

On 10 June 2023, Somerset announced that Bashir had signed a two-year contract extension, keeping him with the county until the end of the 2025 season. He made his first-class debut for Somerset against Essex on 11 June 2023.

On 15 July 2023, he featured on finals day as Somerset beat Surrey and Essex to win the T20 Blast at Edgbaston Cricket Ground.

=== Worcestershire (2024 loan) ===
He joined Worcestershire County Cricket Club on a short-term loan in June 2024. He made his debut for Worcestershire in the 2024 T20 Blast against Nottinghamshire on 7 June.

Bashir was named Young Player of the Year at the 2024 Cricket Writers' Club Awards.

=== Glamorgan (2025 loan) ===
Despite his success in international cricket, Bashir still found himself behind Jack Leach and Archie Vaughan as spin options at Somerset, and subsequently went on loan to Glamorgan to play red ball cricket before the 2025 test match series against India. Bashir found form hard to come by, and finished his 3 game spell taking only 2 wickets at an average of 152 runs per wicket. These poor returns did not dissuade England from selecting him however, and therefore Bashir's loan at Glamorgan ended once he was called up for the sole test match against Zimbabwe.

=== Derbyshire ===
In January 2026, Bashir joined Derbyshire on a two-year contract having rejected an offer to stay at Somerset.

== International career ==
In October 2023, he was called up to the England Lions cricket team for the first time. In his first competitive match for the England Lions, against Afghanistan B, he took six wickets for 42 runs in 15 overs across both innings.

His talent was spotted by England captain Ben Stokes through social media, as one of the videos of Bashir bowling to former England opener Alastair Cook became talk of the town and went viral on social media. It was Somerset Cricket who had uploaded a small video clip of Bashir's first over, who was playing his first-class debut match, where he was seen bowling to Cook, and Somerset Cricket had shared the video on their official Twitter account, which apparently caught the attention of Ben Stokes, who was very active on Twitter. It was Bashir's first-class debut playing against Essex and he bowled two deliveries in his opening over to Alastair Cook which went onto impress Stokes.

Stokes then forwarded the video of Bashir's bowling to a WhatsApp group which England head coach Brendon McCullum and ECB managing director Rob Key were part of. Stokes convinced England selectors and roped in Bashir for their five match test series in India which was scheduled to commence in January 2024. The decision to select him as one of the frontline spinners for the tour raised eyebrows of many as it ended up as a surprising choice given Bashir only played six first class matches at that time when he received the callup.

On 11 December 2023, Bashir received his maiden call-up to the senior England side, being included in the 16-man squad for the test tour of India. However, he faced challenges with regards to visa issues and his entry was initially delayed by Indian authorities mainly due to his Pakistani heritage background. All members of the England squad flew to India from Abu Dhabi except for Shoaib Bashir. Bashir had returned home from Abu Dhabi in order to resolve a visa delay that prevented him from travelling to India with the rest of the squad. He went back to London to complete the visa related formalities. The British Prime Minister, Rishi Sunak, was also involved in sorting things out for Bashir in order to make him safely land in India amid visa concerns.

The visa delay of Bashir apparently became a talking point in the British Parliament and it sparked outrage in British media. The UK PM's Office insisted that it expected India to treat British citizens fairly after expressing its disappointment over not granting a visa to Bashir. A source in India’s Ministry of External Affairs (MEA) confirmed that Bashir had been granted a visa on his return to the United Kingdom. It was also later revealed that the reason his application got cleared much later than the other members of the England team was his Pakistani origin.

On 1 February 2024, Bashir was included in the England team for his test debut in the second test match of the five match series against India in Visakhapatnam. On 25 February 2024, he claimed his maiden test 5-for, finishing the innings with 5/119 in only in his second test match appearance and it was also his maiden five-wicket haul in his first-class career. He also became the second youngest ever overseas spinner to claim a five-wicket haul in Indian soil behind South Africa's Paul Adams.

In June 2024, Bashir was picked ahead of his Somerset teammate Jack Leach to play for England against the West Indies. In the first test, Bashir was run out without scoring and did not bowl a single ball. In the second test on 21 July 2024, he claimed his third test 5-for, in the second innings finishing with figures of 5/41. He became the youngest England spinner to take a five-wicket haul at home.

Bashir was included in the England Lions squad to tour Australia in January 2025.

He took his fiftieth test wicket during the first innings of England's test match against Zimbabwe in May 2025, becoming the youngest Englishman to reach the milestone. In the second innings he took 6/91 for his new best test figures, and was given the man-of-the-match award.

Bashir suffered a broken finger playing for England in the third test of their test match series against India at Lords in July 2025. Despite the injury, he batted on the fourth day and bowled on the final day of the match, taking the match-winning final wicket, although was ruled out of the rest of the series. Despite not playing for the rest of the summer, Bashir was selected by England to tour Australia in 2025-26. He only returned to action at the start of the tour, and was not selected in the first three test matches as Australia built an unassailable 3-0 lead in the series, with no spinner selected in the first test match in Perth and Will Jacks favoured for the second and third matches.
