= Dhruv Jurel =

Indian cricketer (born 2001)

- Jurel playing for India in 2026

Personal information
- Full name: Dhruv Chand Jurel
- Born: 21 January 2001 (age 25); Agra, Uttar Pradesh, India
- Height: 1.8 m (5 ft 11 in)
- Batting: Right-handed
- Role: Wicket-keeper-batter

International information
- National side: India (2024–present)
- Test debut (cap 312): 15 February 2024 v England
- Last Test: 14 November 2025 v South Africa
- T20I debut (cap 112): 6 July 2024 v Zimbabwe
- Last T20I: 28 January 2025 v England
- T20I shirt no.: 16

Domestic team information
- Years: Team
- 2021–present: Uttar Pradesh
- 2023–present: Rajasthan Royals

Career statistics
Competition	Test	T20I	FC	LA
Matches	12	4	41	17
Runs scored	651	12	2890	747
Batting average	40.68	4.00	55.57	74.70
100s/50s	2/2 1/1	0/0	8/17	2/6
Top score	125	6	249	160*
Catches/stumpings	25/2	4/1	96/6	24/6
Medal record
Men's cricket
Representing India
ICC U19 Cricket World Cup
Runner-up	2020 South Africa
ACC U19 Asia Cup
Winner	2019 Sri Lanka
- Source: ESPNcricinfo, 24 December 2025

Dhruv Chand Jurel (Hindi: [d̪ʰɾʊʋ dʒʊɾeːl]; born 21 January 2001) is an Indian international cricketer. He is a right-handed batter and wicket-keeper. Jurel represents Uttar Pradesh in domestic cricket and Rajasthan Royals in the Indian Premier League. He was the Indian U19 team's vice-captain at the 2020 U19 Cricket World Cup.

== Early life and domestic career ==
Jurel was born in Agra on 21 January 2001. His father served in the Indian army and is a Kargil war veteran. At the age of five, he had to have plastic surgery when his left leg was trapped under a bus tyre.

Dhruv Jurel attributes his selection to the Indian Test team to the sacrifices of his parents, highlighting his father's, a Kargil war veteran, initial reluctance due to financial constraints. When he was 14, his dad took out a loan to buy him a 2000 rupee (£20) Kashmir willow bat, and his mother pawned her only gold necklace to buy a kit bag.

He started playing cricket during a summer camp in his school. Over there, he saw some children playing cricket and it developed his interest in the game. He then left his home in Agra and went to train at a cricket academy in Noida, on Delhi's outskirts. He played youth cricket for Uttar Pradesh's U-14, U-16 and U-19 teams.

Jurel made his Twenty20 debut on 10 January 2021 for Uttar Pradesh in the 2020–21 Syed Mushtaq Ali Trophy. Prior to his T20 debut, he was named as the vice-captain of India's squad for the 2020 Under-19 Cricket World Cup.

In February 2022, he was bought by the Rajasthan Royals in the auction for the 2022 Indian Premier League tournament. He made his first-class debut on 17 February 2022, for Uttar Pradesh in the 2021–22 Ranji Trophy. Jurel made his debut for Rajasthan Royals against Punjab Kings at Guwahati on 5 April 2023, hitting 32*(15). This performance cemented Jurel's place in the side.

He made his List A debut on 14 July 2023, for India A against United Arab Emirates A, in the 2023 ACC Emerging Teams Asia Cup.

In August 2025, Dhruv was named as the captain of Central Zone cricket team for 2025–26 Duleep Trophy.

== International career ==
Jurel (fielding) playing a Test match for India against New Zealand in November 2026

In January 2024, he earned his maiden Indian call-up for first two tests vs England.

On 15 February 2024, Dhruv Jurel made his Test debut for India in the third test against England in Rajkot. In his maiden test innings, he scored 46 off 104 balls, but did not get a chance to bat in the second innings, as India declared at 430/4 after lunch on day four.

In the fourth test against England at Ranchi, Jurel scored a crucial 90 runs off 149 balls in the first innings and kept India in the game as wickets fell around him and England took control. He turned out to be the highest run scorer in the innings for India. In the second innings, he stopped a collapse of the Indian batting side and stitched up a crucial 72 run partnership with Shubman Gill to steer India to victory and hit the winning runs with a gritty 39* runs from 77 balls. In his second test itself Jurel was awarded as player of the match for his crucial knocks in both the innings which helped India to register victory over England in the match taking an unassailable lead of 3–1 in the 5 match series.

During the 3rd Test of the 2025 series in England, Jurel was India's substitute wicket-keeper after Rishabh Pant injured his finger and again in the 4th test when Pant injured his foot and finger.

During the 2nd Test match against Sri Lanka, Jurel hit his maiden overseas Test hundred and second overall, hitting an unbeaten 115 runs off 177 balls.

== International centuries ==
=== Test centuries ===
Runs	Against	Pos.	Inn.	Test	S/R	Venue	H/A/N	Date	Result
125	West Indies	5	2	1/2	59.52	Narendra Modi Stadium, Ahmedabad	Home	3 October 2025	Won
115*	Sri Lanka	7	1	2/2	64.97	R. Premadasa Stadium, Colombo	Away	24 August 2026	TBD
