= Josh Tongue =

English cricketer (born 1997)

Personal information
- Full name: Joshua Charles Tongue
- Born: 15 November 1997 (age 28); Redditch, Worcestershire, England
- Height: 6 ft 4 in (1.93 m)
- Batting: Right-handed
- Bowling: Right-arm fast-medium
- Role: Bowler

International information
- National side: England (2023–present)
- Test debut (cap 711): 1 June 2023 v Ireland
- Last Test: 9 September 2026 v Pakistan
- ODI debut (cap 281): 14 July 2026 v India
- Last ODI: 22 October 2026 v Sri Lanka
- ODI shirt no.: 56
- T20I debut (cap 110): 4 July 2026 v India
- Last T20I: 19 September 2026 v Sri Lanka

Domestic team information
- Years: Team
- 2016–2023: Worcestershire (squad no. 24)
- 2023–2026: Manchester Super Giants (squad no. 24)
- 2024–present: Nottinghamshire (squad no. 24)

Career statistics
Competition	Test	ODI	T20I	FC
Matches	15	5	5	75
Runs scored	133	1	–	984
Batting average	7.82	0.50	–	13.47
100s/50s	0/0	0/0	–/–	0/1
Top score	30*	1*	–	55
Balls bowled	2,918	215	120	12,483
Wickets	76	5	8	289
Bowling average	26.32	49.00	23.50	26.03
5 wickets in innings	4	0	0	16
10 wickets in match	0	0	0	0
Best bowling	5/45	3/79	4/28	6/97
Catches/stumpings	6/–	0/–	0/–	15/–
- Source: Cricinfo, 29 October 2026

Joshua Charles Tongue (born 15 November 1997) is an English cricketer who plays for the England Test team and Nottinghamshire having previously represented Worcestershire. He is a right-arm fast bowler, who also bats right-handed.

== Domestic career ==
Tongue made his first-class debut for Worcestershire against the Oxford MCC University team in March 2016. He made his List A debut for Worcestershire in the 2017 Royal London One-Day Cup on 5 May 2017.

Tongue was affectionately known as 'Jeevy Boy' by his Worcestershire teammates. He signed a three-year contract with Nottinghamshire in July 2023.

Having missed the entire 2024 English county season due to injury, Tongue belatedly made his Nottinghamshire debut in the opening round of the 2025 County Championship in an eight-wicket win against Durham, scoring his maiden first-class half-century with 55 in his team's first innings and taking 5/66 in their opponent's second innings.

In April 2026, Tongue signed a three-year contract extension with Nottinghamshire, tying him into the club until at least the end of the 2029 season.

== International career ==
In May 2023, Tongue was named in England's XI for their one-off Test match against Ireland. He made his Test debut for England against Ireland on 1 June 2023. On 2 June 2023, Tongue took his maiden test wicket, before going on to finish the innings with figures of 5-66.

Tongue returned to the England test squad in the summer of 2025, featuring in the one-off test against Zimbabwe and the five test series against India. Despite only featuring in three tests, Tongue was England's top wicket-taker in the India series with 19, including taking 5–125 in the third innings of the fifth test at The Oval.

On 4 November 2025, the England and Wales Cricket Board (ECB) awarded Tongue a 2-year multi-format central contract.

In September 2025, he was included in the England squad for the 2025-26 Ashes series. Tongue played his first match of the series in the Third Test Match at the Adelaide Oval, 17 December, and took figures of 5–134 in the match. In the Fourth Test Match at Melbourne, 26 December, he took figures of 7-89 and was awarded Player of the Match. And in the final match of the series at Sydney, 4 January, his match figures were 6–139, giving him 18 wickets for the series.
