= Akash Deep =

Indian cricketer (born 1996)

- Deep playing for India in 2026

Personal information
- Born: 15 December 1996 (age 29); Dehri, Rohtas, Bihar, India
- Height: 1.85 m (6 ft 1 in)
- Batting: Right-handed
- Bowling: Right-arm fast-medium
- Role: Bowler

International information
- National side: India (2024–present)
- Test debut (cap 313): 23 February 2024 v England
- Last Test: 31 July 2025 v England

Domestic team information
- Years: Team
- 2016–present: Mohun Bagan
- 2019–present: Bengal
- 2022–2024: Royal Challengers Bengaluru
- 2024: Siliguri Strikers
- 2025: Lucknow Super Giants
- 2026: Kolkata Knight Riders

Career statistics
Competition	Test	FC	LA	T20
Matches	10	45	28	48
Runs scored	163	730	140	84
Batting average	11.64	13.03	12.72	10.50
100s/50s	0/1	0/2	0/0	0/0
Top score	66	66	44	17
Balls bowled	1,536	7,366	1,280	1,008
Wickets	28	151	42	52
Bowling average	35.78	26.29	24.50	26.51
5 wickets in innings	1	6	0	0
10 wickets in match	1	2	–	–
Best bowling	6/99	6/60	3/6	4/35
Catches/stumpings	2/–	19/–	4/–	10/–
- Source: Espncricinfo, 17 November 2025

Akash Deep (Hindi: [aːkaːʃ d̪iːp] born 15 December 1996) is an Indian international cricketer. He plays as a right arm fast bowler and right handed lower order batter for the Indian team in test cricket. He represents Bengal in domestic cricket and Kolkata Knight Riders in the Indian Premier League.

== Personal life ==
Akash Deep was born in Dehri, Bihar. His father Ramji Singh served as a government school teacher in Bihar's Sasaram. He faced opposition from his parents and neighbors in Bihar for his passion for playing cricket over academics. At a time when the Bihar Cricket Association was suspended, there was no proper platform for budding cricketers in Bihar to pursue their career prospects in cricket, and Akash Deep was one of the victims of it. Some of the parents urged their children not to mingle with Akash Deep, as Akash was the only person to passionately engage in cricket in Sasaram. Meanwhile, some of those parents were cautious that their own children would follow in the footsteps of Akash Deep by abandoning academics.

Akash Deep's father apparently wanted his son to appear for exams that would help him land a government job, but Akash was more keen on not giving up his interest in cricket. His father advised him to attend the Bihar police constable's exams or at least try for state government's Class IV staff peon job. However, he faced setbacks at a time when he was focusing on his career ambitions as his father and his elder brother died unexpectedly, leaving behind Akash as well as two sisters in their family. His father and elder brother died all within six months and Akash became the immediate breadwinner in his family.

== Early career ==
A close friend of him helped him to join a cricket club in Durgapur to manage his daily expenses. He started playing tennis-ball matches around Durgapur and earned INR 600 per day and he would earn around 20,000 per month playing tennis-ball matches.

He joined a United Club in the CAB first division league in 2010 to realize his dreams of cricketing career. He initially joined a local academy as a frontline batsman, but at the request of his coaches, he switched to fast bowling as he started gaining height over the years. He worked alongside former Bengal fast bowler Ranadeb Bose as part of India's Vision 2020 programme and he got selected for the Bengal U-23 cricket team within a year. However, he faced a career-threatening back injury at that time, and he apparently received support from his Bengal U-23 head coach, Sourasish Lahiri, who looked after his rehabilitation process.

== Domestic career ==
He made his Twenty20 debut for Bengal in the 2018–19 Syed Mushtaq Ali Trophy on 9 March 2019. He made his List A debut on 24 September 2019, for Bengal in the 2019–20 Vijay Hazare Trophy. He made his first-class debut on 25 December 2019, for Bengal in the 2019–20 Ranji Trophy.

On 30 August 2021, Deep was included in the Royal Challengers Bangalore squad for the second phase of the 2021 Indian Premier League (IPL) in the UAE. In February 2022, he was bought by the Royal Challengers Bangalore in the auction for the 2022 Indian Premier League tournament. He also took eleven scalps including two four-wicket hauls in two tour games for India A against England Lions prior to his test callup.

== International career ==
Deep playing a Test match for India against New Zealand in November 2026

Akash Deep replaced injured Shivam Mavi in India's squad for the 2022 Asian Games but didn't make the final squad. In November 2023, he was included in India's ODI squad for the series against South Africa in South Africa as an injury replacement for Deepak Chahar, but he did not play in any of the matches.

In February 2024, he received his maiden Test callup for the last three Tests for the home Test series against England. He received the news of his selection while he was playing the 2023–24 Ranji Trophy representing Bengal.

He was named in Anderson–Tendulkar Trophy squad for India, against England, in 2025. Although he was not picked in the first test, he played a crucial role in the second, in place of Jasprit Bumrah. He achieved his maiden 10-wicket haul with 4 in the first innings and 6 in the second, helping India. In the same series he scored the second-highest score by any nightwatchman for India. He was batting to protect the captain, Shubman Gill, in the India vs England test series 2025, and hit 12 boundaries. He scored his maiden half century ending up with 66 runs.
