= New Zealand cricket team in England in 2026 =

International cricket tour

- Crowe–Thorpe Trophy
	England	New Zealand
- Dates: 4 – 29 June 2026
Captains	Ben Stokes (Note: Captained the 1st Test and 3rd Test but suspended for the 2nd due to an off-pitch incident.); Joe Root (Note: Captained the 2nd Test whilst Stokes was suspended.)	Tom Latham

Test series
- Result: New Zealand won the 3-match series 2–1
Most runs	Ben Duckett (246)	Daryl Mitchell (235)
Most wickets	Jofra Archer (11)	Nathan Smith (16)
- Player of the series: Nathan Smith (NZ); Jofra Archer (Eng)

The New Zealand cricket team toured England in June 2026 to play the England cricket team. The tour consisted of three Test matches. The Test series formed part of the 2025–2027 ICC World Test Championship. In July 2025, the England and Wales Cricket Board (ECB) confirmed the fixtures for the tour as part of the 2026 home international season.

England had won the Crowe–Thorpe Trophy after defeating New Zealand 2–1 in the previous series in 2024–25. However, this time New Zealand won the series by 2–1 to win the trophy for the first time.

This was also the last Test series of Kane Williamson and Ben Stokes before their retirements from international cricket.

== Squads ==
England named a 15-man squad for the first Test, with Jofra Archer and Jordan Cox unavailable, having yet to return to England from the recently concluded 2026 Indian Premier League season. On 10 June, England named their 15-man squad for the second Test, with Archer and Cox replacing Gus Atkinson and regular captain Ben Stokes, both of whom were suspended following a nightclub incident on 8 June, while Joe Root was appointed interim captain of the team in Stokes' absence. Henry Crocombe was called into the England Test squad as cover for Ollie Robinson due to Robinson's knee soreness.

England	New Zealand
Ben Stokes (c); Joe Root (c); Harry Brook (vc); Rehan Ahmed; Jofra Archer; Gus Atkinson; Sonny Baker; Shoaib Bashir; Jacob Bethell; Jordan Cox (wk); Henry Crocombe; Ben Duckett; Matthew Fisher; Emilio Gay; James Rew (wk); Ollie Robinson; Jamie Smith (wk); Josh Tongue	Tom Latham (c); Tom Blundell (wk); Devon Conway; Zak Foulkes; Dean Foxcroft; Matt Henry; Kyle Jamieson; Daryl Mitchell; Henry Nicholls; Will O'Rourke; Glenn Phillips; Rachin Ravindra; Mitchell Santner; Ben Sears; Nathan Smith; Blair Tickner; Kane Williamson; Will Young

== Test series ==
=== 1st Test ===
4–8 June 2026
Scorecard

England	v	New Zealand
140 (39.4 overs); Harry Brook 56 (71); Kyle Jamieson 5/62 (14 overs)		113 (29.5 overs); Kyle Jamieson 38* (29); Ollie Robinson 5/39 (10.5 overs)
226 (56 overs); Emilio Gay 57 (95); Nathan Smith 6/70 (17 overs)		138 (40.3 overs); Glenn Phillips 44* (52); Gus Atkinson 5/30 (11.3 overs)

England won by 115 runs
Lord's, London
Umpires: Adrian Holdstock (SA) and Rod Tucker (Aus)
Player of the match: Ollie Robinson (Eng)

- New Zealand won the toss and elected to field.
- Play on day 1 was reduced to 59 overs due to rain and a wet outfield.
- Play on day 3 was reduced to 10 overs due to rain.
- Emilio Gay (Eng) made his Test debut.
- Josh Tongue (Eng) took his 50th Test wicket.
- Rod Tucker stood in his 100th Test match.
- Kane Williamson (NZ) played his last Test match.
- World Test Championship points: England 12, New Zealand 0.

=== 2nd Test ===
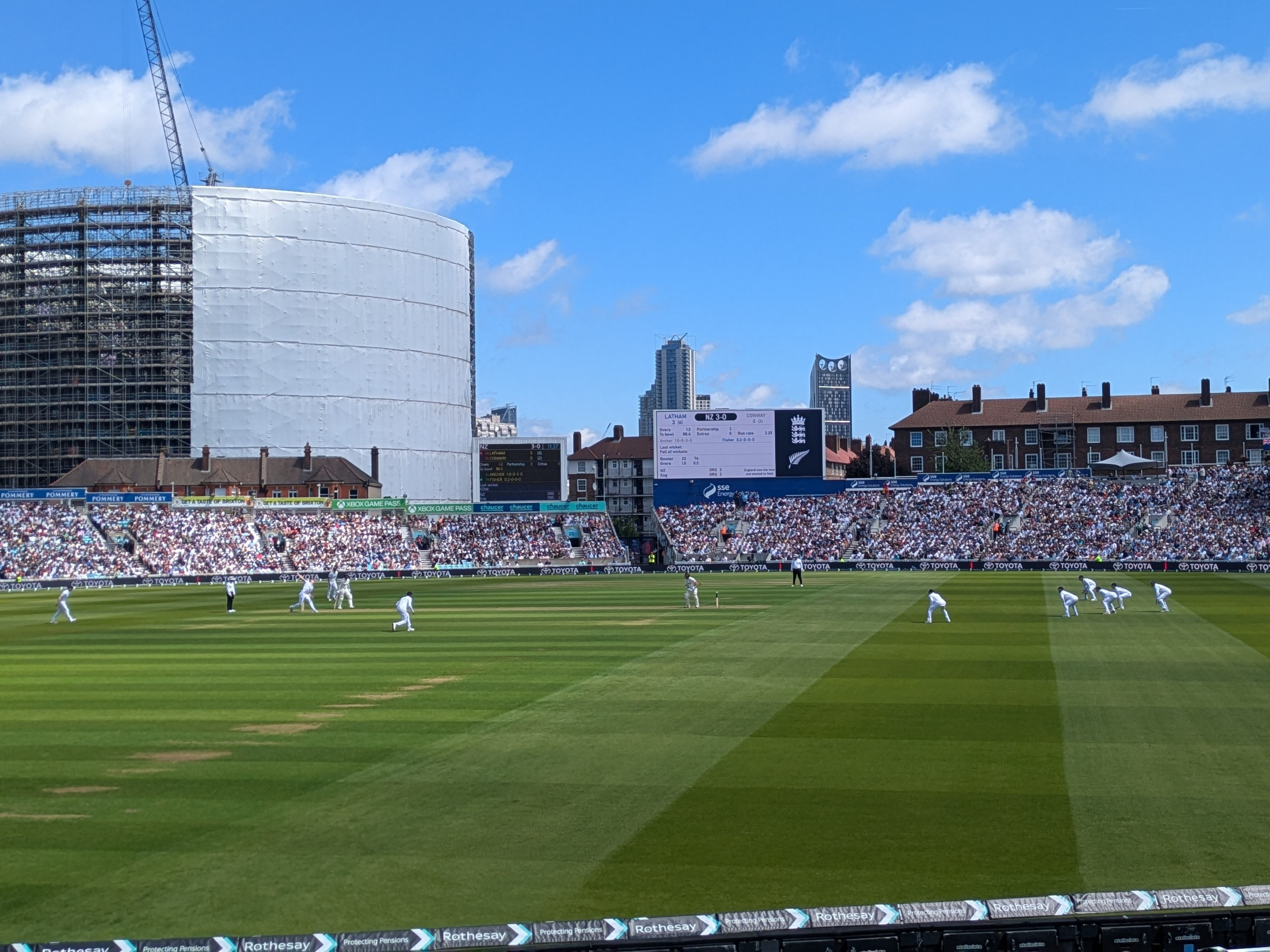
Matthew Fisher bowling to Tom Latham during the second Test

17–21 June 2026
Scorecard

New Zealand	v	England
391 (96.2 overs); Glenn Phillips 100 (135); Jacob Bethell 3/26 (10 overs)		291 (84 overs); Emilio Gay 53 (114); Matt Henry 5/80 (24 overs)
362 (87.1 overs); Henry Nicholls 121 (171); Matthew Fisher 3/58 (17 overs)		209 (58.1 overs); Joe Root 77 (145); Matt Henry 6/29 (18.1 overs)

New Zealand won by 253 runs
The Oval, London
Umpires: Adrian Holdstock (SA) and Nitin Menon (Ind)
Player of the match: Matt Henry (NZ)

- England won the toss and elected to field.
- Sonny Baker, Jordan Cox and James Rew (Eng) all made their Test debuts.
- Glenn Phillips (NZ) scored his maiden Test century.
- Joe Root (Eng) scored his 14,000th run in Tests.
- Matt Henry (NZ) took his first ten-wicket haul.
- World Test Championship points: New Zealand 12, England –12. (Note: England were deducted a total of 12 points for maintaining a slow over-rate.)

=== 3rd Test ===
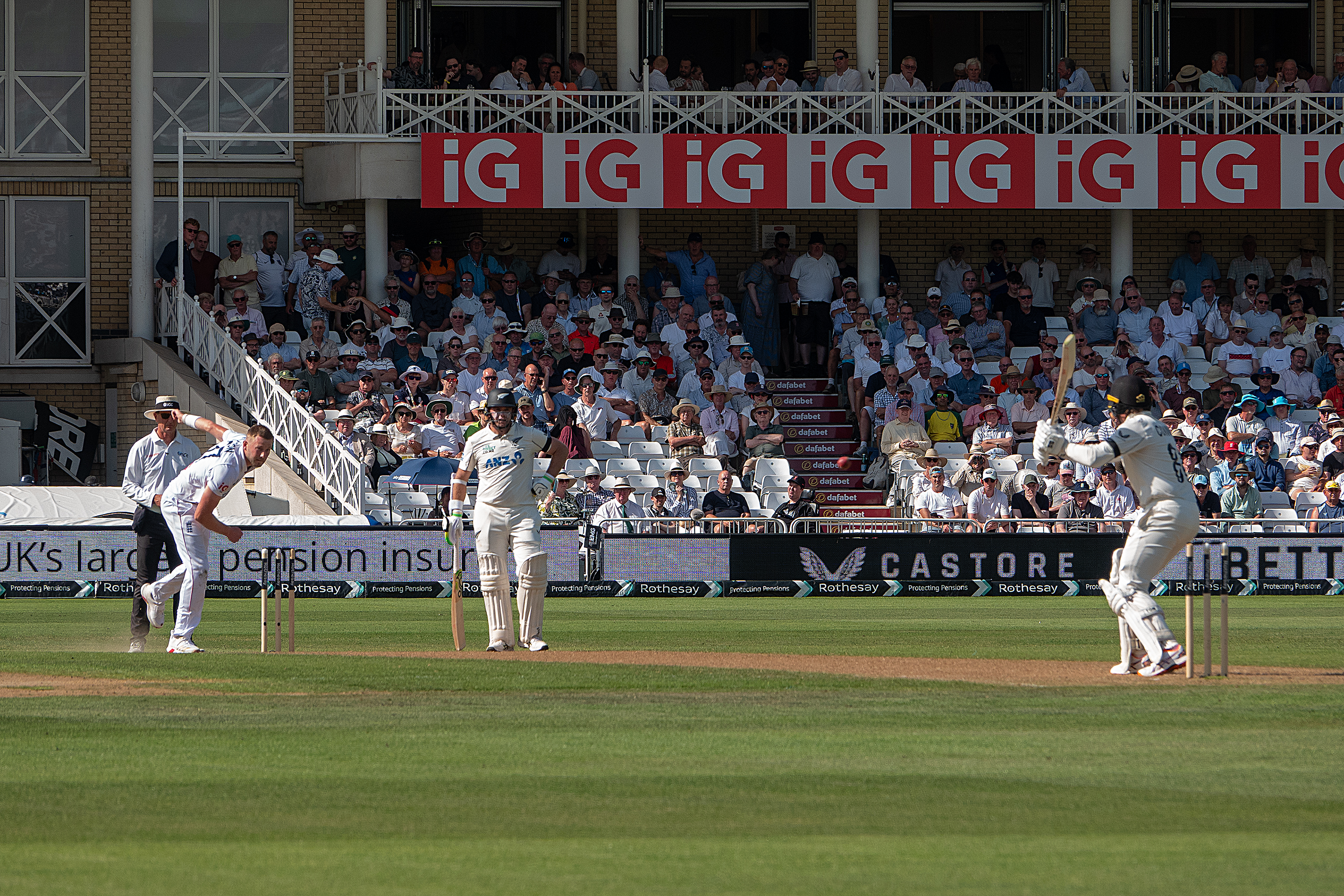
Gus Atkinson bowling to Devon Conway on day one of the third Test

25–29 June 2026
Scorecard

New Zealand	v	England
438 (114.5 overs); Devon Conway 157 (224); Ben Stokes 4/70 (21 overs)		354 (88.2 overs); Ben Duckett 113 (99); Nathan Smith 4/91 (23 overs)
288/9d (94 overs); Daryl Mitchell 100* (241); Jofra Archer 4/53 (20 overs)		212 (51.2 overs); Jamie Smith 60 (91); Zak Foulkes 3/52 (11.1 overs)

New Zealand won by 160 runs
Trent Bridge, Nottingham
Umpires: Nitin Menon (Ind) and Rod Tucker (Aus)
Player of the match: Daryl Mitchell (NZ)

- New Zealand won the toss and elected to bat.
- Zak Foulkes (NZ) came in as a concussion substitute for Blair Tickner after 27.1 overs of England's first innings.
- Ben Stokes (Eng) took his 250th wicket in Tests.
- Ben Stokes (Eng) played his last Test match.
- World Test Championship points: New Zealand 12, England 0.
