= Matthew Fisher (English cricketer) =

English cricketer (born 1997)

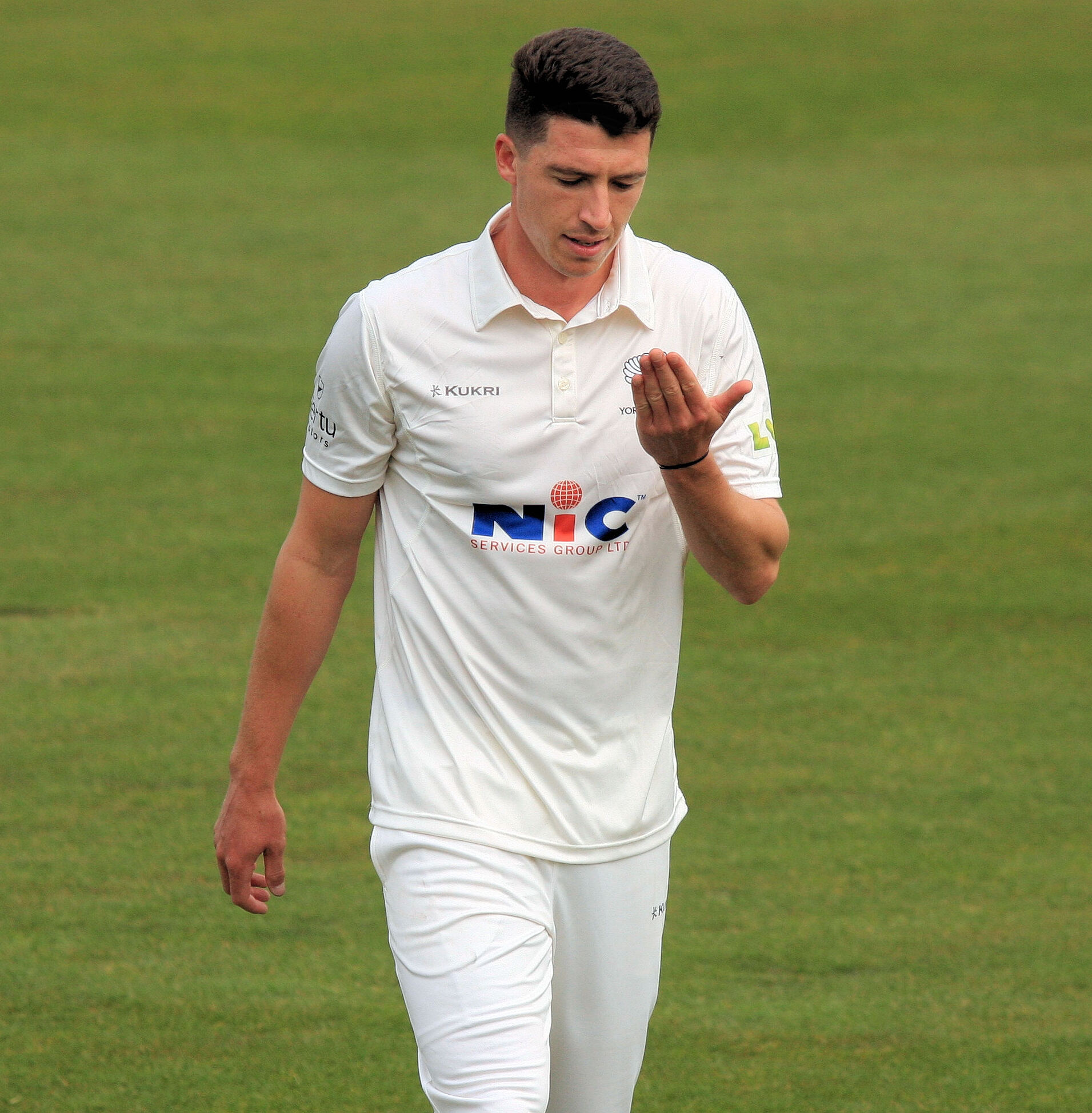
- Fisher in 2022

Personal information
- Full name: Matthew David Fisher
- Born: 9 November 1997 (age 29); York, North Yorkshire, England
- Batting: Right-handed
- Bowling: Right-arm fast-medium
- Role: Bowler

International information
- National side: England (2022–present)
- Test debut (cap 702): 16 March 2022 v West Indies
- Last Test: 17 June 2026 v New Zealand

Domestic team information
- Years: Team
- 2013–2024: Yorkshire (squad no. 7)
- 2021: Northern Superchargers
- 2023: Southern Brave
- 2025–2026: Surrey (squad no. 15)
- 2026: London Spirit

Career statistics
Competition	Test	FC	LA	T20
Matches	2	68	35	46
Runs scored	50	1,163	236	61
Batting average	50.00	17.10	26.22	8.71
100s/50s	0/1	0/3	0/0	0/0
Top score	50*	88	36*	19
Balls bowled	404	11,111	1,414	838
Wickets	6	217	32	47
Bowling average	31.83	27.78	43.81	27.06
5 wickets in innings	0	7	0	1
10 wickets in match	0	1	0	0
Best bowling	3/58	6/73	3/22	5/22
Catches/stumpings	1/–	25/–	11/–	12/–
- Source: Cricinfo, 27 September 2026

Matthew David Fisher (born 9 November 1997) is an English cricketer, who plays for Surrey County Cricket Club. He made his international debut for the England cricket team in March 2022.

== Career ==
=== Domestic career ===
Fisher made his debut on 9 June 2013 in the 2013 Yorkshire Bank 40 against Leicestershire, and at the age of 15 years and 212 days, became the youngest cricketer to play in a competitive county game. The previous record was set in 1922 by the Welsh cricketer Royston Gabe-Jones. In May 2015 on his debut in the T20 Blast, he took five wickets for Yorkshire against Derbyshire.

Since debut Fisher has suffered a range of injuries including side strains, a broken thumb, a dislocated shoulder, a back stress injury and recurrent hamstring problems, all of which have limited his involvement in county cricket over a number of seasons.

In April 2022, Fisher was bought by the Birmingham Phoenix for the 2022 season of The Hundred.

In August 2024, it was announced that Fisher would leave Yorkshire at the end of the season. In October 2024, Fisher signed for Surrey County Cricket Club.

=== International career ===
Fisher was included in the England Under 19 squad in 2013 aged 15, he has also featured for the England Lions team playing against the Australia A team in December 2021.

In February 2022, Fisher was named in England's Test squad for their series against the West Indies, and made his Test debut in the second match of the series, on 16 March 2022.

Fisher made his second Test match appearance, and first in England, against New Zealand at The Oval in June 2026. He scored his first Test half-century, making 50 not out in his team's first innings.
