= Clarence P. Moody =

Australian cricket writer

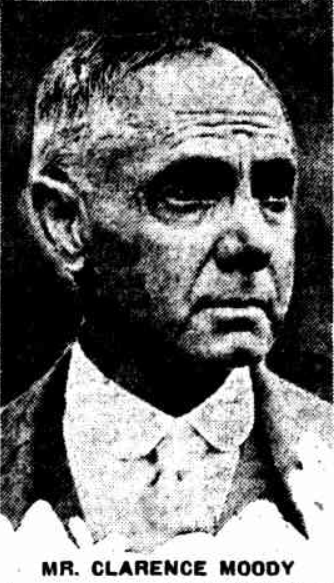

Clarence Percival Moody (11 August 1867 – 29 November 1937) was an Australian newspaper editor, sports journalist, cricket historian and bowls player. He made a significant contribution to the development and history of Test cricket.

As a reporter he covered an Australian XI cricket tour of England in the early 1890s. At the first ever Sheffield Shield match, between South Australia and New South Wales, played at the Adelaide Oval in 1892, Moody, for the South Australian Register, wrote that Ernie Jones, "Australia's first fast bowler", "bowled capitally in the second innings", adding that Jones should get stouter boots to prevent his left foot slipping when delivering.

Having written for the South Australian Register under the pen name "Point", in 1894 he published Australian Cricket and Cricketers: 1856 [to] 1893–94, an anthology of the game in Australia, and which included a list of Australia v England matches that came to be considered the definitive guide to what constituted a Test match and helped establish The Ashes tradition. Over the next few years, he went on to write other books, including England v Australia: Cricket Reminiscences of Past Conflicts (1898), for which he was the ghostwriter for George Giffen's autobiography.

In 1912, Moody set up three short-lived newspapers – the Sporting Mail (1912–1914), Saturday Mail (1912–1917), and The Mail (May 1912, with an initial run of 18,000), the latter going into liquidation in late 1914, and eventually being merged into The News. After the First World War he moved to Sydney, where he continued to work in sports journalism.

Moody married Eleanor Maud Barker in East Adelaide in May 1892. When he died in Sydney in November 1937, she and three of their children survived him, one son having died in the First World War.

== Publications ==
- 1894: Australian cricket and cricketers 1856 [to] 1893-94. Melbourne: R.A. Thompson
- 1898: Cricket album: noted Australian cricketers. Adelaide: Hussey and Gillingham
- 1898: South Australian cricket: Reminiscences of fifty years. Adelaide: W.K. Thomas
- 1890: The seventh Australian team in England, 1890: biographical sketches by Clarence P. Moody. Wright: Office of Cricket
- 1898: England v Australia: Cricket Reminiscences of Past Conflicts, with George Giffen
