= Royston =

Royston may refer to:

== Places ==
=== Australia ===
- Royston, Queensland, a rural locality

=== Canada ===
- Royston, British Columbia, a small hamlet

=== England ===
- Royston, Hertfordshire, a town and civil parish, formerly partly in Cambridgeshire
- Royston, South Yorkshire, a suburban village, near Barnsley, and Wakefield
- Royston Vasey, a fictional town in the television series The League of Gentlemen

=== Scotland ===
- Royston, Glasgow, a district of Glasgow, traditionally known as Garngad

=== United States ===
- Royston, Georgia, a town
- Royston, Texas, a ghost town

== Surname ==
Royston is an English Toponymic Surname, and comes from a place in South Yorkshire named Royston.

== People ==
- Royston Drenthe (born 1987), Dutch football player
- Royston Ellis (born 1941), English writer
- Royston Ffrench (born 1975), British jockey
- Royston Evans (1884–1977), Australian cricketer and soccer player, commonly known as Mac Evans
- Royston Gabe-Jones (1906–1965), Welsh cricketer
- Royston or Roy Goodacre (born 1967), British Microbiologist and Analytical Chemist
- Royston Nash, English conductor
- Royston Tan (born 1976), Singaporean film-maker
- Royston Vasey, real name of English comedian Roy 'Chubby' Brown
- Henry Royston (1819–1873), English cricketer
- Young Lea Royston (1819–1884), Confederate States Army colonel
- Ivor Royston, American physician and entrepreneur
- Brigadier General John Royston (1860–1942), South African-born British army officer
- Richard Royston (1601-1686), English bookseller and publisher
- Robert Royston (1918–2008), master landscape architect
- Shad Royston (born 1982), Australian rugby league player
- Royston Sagigi-Baira (born 1999), Australian singer and winner of Australian Idol in 2023

== See also ==
- Royston crow, another name of the hooded crow
- Royston Vasey, a fictional town in which The League of Gentlemen is set
- Royston Town F.C., an English football club in Hertfordshire
- Craigroyston F.C., a Scottish football side
- Craigroyston Community High School
