= Emilio Gay =

Cricketer (born 2000)

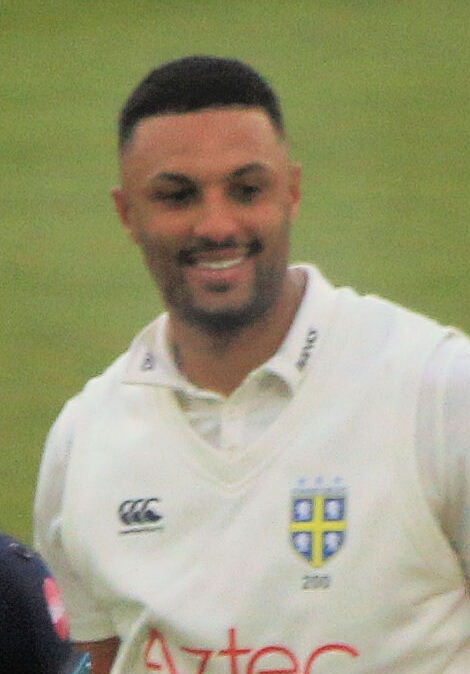
- Gay in 2025

Personal information
- Full name: Emilio Nico Gay
- Born: 14 April 2000 (age 26); Bedford, Bedfordshire, England
- Batting: Left-handed
- Bowling: Right-arm medium
- Role: Opening batter

International information
- National sides: Italy (2025); England (2026–present)
- Test debut (cap 720): 4 June 2026; England v New Zealand
- Last Test: 9 September 2026; England v Pakistan
- T20I debut (cap 46): 5 July 2025; Italy v Guernsey
- Last T20I: 11 July 2025; Italy v Netherlands

Domestic team information
- Years: Team
- 2019–2024: Northamptonshire (squad no. 19)
- 2024: → Durham (on loan)
- 2025–present: Durham (squad no. 24)
- 2026: Rangpur Riders

Career statistics
Competition	Test	T20I	FC	LA
Matches	6	3	80	43
Runs scored	271	64	5,114	1,341
Batting average	24.63	21.33	39.33	38.31
100s/50s	0/3	0/1	14/21	3/7
Top score	60	50	261	131
Balls bowled	–	–	174	42
Wickets	–	–	2	1
Bowling average	–	–	58.50	44.00
5 wickets in innings	–	–	0	0
10 wickets in match	–	–	0	0
Best bowling	–	–	1/8	1/25
Catches/stumpings	8/–	0/–	73/–	23/–
- Source: ESPNcricinfo, 27 September 2026

Emilio Nico Gay (born 14 April 2000) is an English and Italian cricketer who plays for Durham, and the England Test team. He previously played for Northamptonshire in domestic cricket, and Italy in T20 Internationals (T20I).

== Early life ==
Gay was born in Bedford, England, and educated at Bedford School. His father's family came from Grenada, and his mother is half-Italian.

== Domestic career ==
Gay became involved with Northamptonshire's academy programme at under-15 level, and was named their Player of the Year in 2018. He was awarded his first professional contract with the club in 2019, making his first-class debut on 23 September against Gloucestershire in that year's County Championship (due to bad weather during the match, he did not play his first innings until the following season). In January 2021, he signed a new two-year deal with Northamptonshire. He recorded his maiden first-class century in the 2021 County Championship, when he scored 101 against Kent at Canterbury on 3 June. He made his Twenty20 debut on 18 July 2021, for Northamptonshire in the 2021 T20 Blast. He made his List A debut on 25 July 2021, for Northamptonshire in the 2021 Royal London One-Day Cup. He made his maiden first-class double century on 13 April 2024, during a County Championship match against Middlesex. His score of 261 off 401 balls was the highest recorded by a Northamptonshire batsman in a Championship game between the two sides.

In 2024, Gay turned down the offer of a contact extension at Northamptonshire, with Durham and Warwickshire reported to be amongst the clubs interested in signing him. He was ruled out of the county's remaining games in the season's One-Day Cup, but not the County Championship. On 5 August, it was confirmed that he had agreed a three-year deal with Durham, to whom he was loaned for the final two rounds of the Championship.

Gay was sold to Rangpur Riders for 2025–26 Bangladesh Premier League, but missed the tournament due to injury.

== International career ==
In May 2025, Gay was named in the England Lions squad for a two-match series against India A.

In July 2025, Gay made his T20I debut for Italy, against Guernsey. In his second match, against Scotland, he scored his maiden T20I half-century, opening the batting. These matches were part of the 2025 Men's T20 World Cup Europe Regional Final. He missed out on selection for the 2026 Men's T20 World Cup with Italy due to an injury sustained whilst playing for the England Lions.

After a good start to the 2026 domestic season, Gay made his debut for the England team in the first Test against New Zealand on 4 June 2026. He made eight in England's first innings, before making his highest Test score of 57 in the second innings. He scored a total of 139 runs in a 2–1 series defeat for England at an average of 23.16. On the 9th of September 2026, he scored his third 50 for England, against Pakistan.

== Media appearances ==
Gay was part of the BBC commentary team for the 2026 edition of The Hundred.
