= Crowe–Thorpe Trophy =

Test cricket series between New Zealand and England

- Countries: England; New Zealand
- Administrator: International Cricket Council; England and Wales Cricket Board; New Zealand Cricket
- Format: Test cricket
- First edition: 2024–25 (New Zealand)
- Tournament format: Test series
- Number of teams: 2
- Current trophy holder: New Zealand (2026)
- Most successful: England; New Zealand (1 series each)
- Qualification: ICC World Test Championship
- Most runs: (New Zealand) Kane Williamson (395)
- Most wickets: (England) Brydon Carse (18)

The Crowe–Thorpe Trophy is a Test cricket series played between the men's cricket teams of England and New Zealand. It was launched in November 2024 during England's tour of New Zealand. The two countries have played each other in international cricket since England's 1929–30 tour of New Zealand.

The trophy commemorates the late Martin Crowe (New Zealand) and the late Graham Thorpe (England).

The trophy, made by David Ngawati, is constructed from bats used by each player to score centuries in series between New Zealand and England in 1994 and 1997. It is inlaid with jade/pounamu. According to the artist, it signifies the pinnacle or highest mountain, and the base represents the players' foundation, "their family members on each side, their clubs, their community". Sir Alastair Cook commented, "It’s not often that boards get things absolutely spot on but that is a brilliant trophy"

Prior to the first named edition in 2024, the Crowe–Thorpe Trophy was unveiled by Deb Crowe (Martin's sister) and the former captain of England, Michael Atherton. England won the series in New Zealand, 2–1; the next will be held in England in 2026.

The competition continued a trend in bilateral international cricket series being named after a famous player from each country, such as the Border–Gavaskar Trophy, the Richards–Botham Trophy and the Chappell–Hadlee Trophy.

== Background ==
=== Test series and one-off encounters not under the trophy ===
The two teams first met when the England national cricket team toured Ceylon, Australia and New Zealand in the 1929–30 season. Thereafter, England and New Zealand contested many Test series before 2024.

Years	Host	Tests	England	New Zealand	Drawn	Series Winner
1929–30	New Zealand	4	1	0	3	England
1931	England	3	1	0	2	England
1932–33	New Zealand	2	0	0	2	Drawn
1937	England	3	1	0	2	England
1946–47	New Zealand	1	0	0	1	Drawn
1949	England	4	0	0	4	Drawn
1950–51	New Zealand	2	1	0	1	England
1954–55	New Zealand	2	2	0	0	England
1958	England	5	4	0	1	England
1958–59	New Zealand	2	1	0	1	England
1962–63	New Zealand	3	3	0	0	England
1965	England	3	3	0	0	England
1965–66	New Zealand	3	0	0	3	Drawn
1969	England	3	2	0	1	England
1970–71	New Zealand	2	1	0	1	England
1973	England	3	2	0	1	England
1974–75	New Zealand	2	1	0	1	England
1977–78	New Zealand	3	1	1	1	Drawn
1978	England	3	3	0	0	England
1983	England	3	2	1	0	England
1983–84	New Zealand	3	0	1	2	New Zealand
1986	England	3	0	1	2	New Zealand
1987–88	New Zealand	3	0	0	3	Drawn
1990	England	3	1	0	2	England
1991–92	New Zealand	3	2	0	1	England
1994	England	3	1	0	2	England
1996–97	New Zealand	3	2	0	1	England
1999	England	4	1	2	1	New Zealand
2001–02	New Zealand	3	1	1	1	Drawn
2004	England	3	3	0	0	England
2007–08	New Zealand	3	2	1	1	England
2008	England	3	2	0	1	England
2012–13	New Zealand	3	0	0	3	Drawn
2013	England	2	2	0	0	England
2015	England	2	1	1	0	Drawn
2017–18	New Zealand	2	0	1	1	New Zealand
2019–20	New Zealand	2	0	1	1	New Zealand
2021	England	2	0	1	1	New Zealand
2022	England	3	3	0	0	England
2022–23	New Zealand	2	1	1	0	Drawn

== Crowe–Thorpe Trophy series ==
Years	Host	Tests	England	New Zealand	Drawn	Player of the Series	Series Winner	Holder at series end
2024–25	New Zealand	3	2	1	0	(England) Harry Brook	England	England
2026	England	3	1	2	0	(New Zealand) Nathan Smith (England) Jofra Archer	New Zealand	New Zealand

Total Series	England	New Zealand	Drawn
2	1	1	0

== See also ==
- Hillary Shield (the rugby union equivalent)
