= Sunday Mail (Adelaide) =

Australian newspaper

- Type: Newspaper
- Format: Broadsheet
- Owner: News Corp Australia
- Founder: Clarence P. Moody
- Editor: George Brickhill
- Founded: 4 May 1912; 114 years ago

The Sunday Mail (originally titled The Mail ) is an Adelaide newspaper first published on 4 May 1912 by Clarence P. Moody. Through much of the 20th century, The Advertiser was Adelaide's morning broadsheet, The News the afternoon tabloid, The Sunday Mail a vehicle for covering weekend sport, and Messenger Newspapers covering community news.

"Sunday Mail" is a business name of Advertiser Newspapers Pty Ltd, a private company that is part of News Corp Australia, which since 2004 has been a component of the U.S. multinational mass media company, News Corp.

== History ==
=== Mail ===
In 1912, Clarence Moody initially set up three newspapers – the Sporting Mail (1912–1914), Saturday Mail (1912–1917), and the Mail. The first two titles lasted only a few years, and the Mail itself went into liquidation in late 1914. Ownership passed briefly to George Annells and Frank Stone, and then to Herbert Syme. In May 1923 News Limited purchased the Mail and moved the newspaper to North Terrace. By this time The News had developed a strong sporting focus, and results of Saturday sporting matches of all types and grades were reported in the Mail.

=== Sunday Mail ===
The paper's name briefly changed to The SA Sunday Mail on 6 February 1954, and then Sunday Mail in 1955. The original 1912 circulation of 15,000 had risen to 213,000 by 1962. For its first 60 years the Mail was printed on Saturday nights. Initially two editions were published, with a "street" edition coming out at about 7:00 pm, followed by a midnight edition which was sold to theatre crowds later in the evening, and distributed throughout the state on Sunday mornings. The Sunday Mail was first published on a Sunday on 5 November 1972, and went on to survive the closure of The News in March 1992.

== Content ==
A particular focus was given to football and horse racing, with many fine sporting photographs and articles being printed. West Torrens footballer and yachtsman Ossie O'Grady became sports writer in 1926 and wrote sometimes controversial sporting feature articles. In the 1930s Ron Boland began his newspaper career as the horse racing writer, "Trafalgar". He was later to become editor of the News. Early motoring was another important feature of the newspaper from the 1920s, as was the advent of commercial radio and aviation. From 1922 under the editorship of George Brickhill, the Mail was a well-presented newspaper with quality reading on a range of topics. No doubt the professionally presented real-estate pages helped fund the improvements.

The much-loved "Possum's pages" were born in 1921 as "the Mail Club" with letters to "clubmates" written by "Possum". The page was called "Mates own corner". In 1924 May Gibbs's gumnut babies, "Bib and Bub", were the first full-scale comic page in the Mail. They were joined in 1932 by Bancks's Ginger Meggs. During the Second World War Lionel Coventry's "Alec the Airman" joined the pages of the paper. Colour was introduced to the comics at the end of the war. Oswald Pryor was cartoonist for the Mail in 1922-1923, followed by Hal Gye and, in the late 1920s, R. W. Blundell. Harry Longson was cartoonist during the war years.

The Second World War had a major impact, not least on newspaper reporting and production. Although horse racing and other sports were still covered in the pages of the Mail, space was also given to war news and the activities of the armed forces. During the war the "Gossip by Deidre" page gave way to the less frivolous "Diana's notebook" with photographs such as "Miss Patricia Hubbard at work in her father's factory" and other reflections of women's war effort activities. Even the "Suburban acre" gardening page took on a more serious tone as "Weeders digest".
