= The News (Adelaide) =

Defunct Adelaide, South Australian afternoon tabloid newspaper

The News was an afternoon daily tabloid newspaper in the city of Adelaide, South Australia, that had its origins in 1869, and ceased circulation in 1992. Through much of the 20th century, The Advertiser was Adelaide's morning broadsheet, The News the afternoon tabloid, with The Sunday Mail covering weekend sport, and Messenger Newspapers community news.

Its former names were The Evening Journal (1869–1912) and The Journal (1912–1923), with the Saturday edition called The Saturday Journal until 1929.

== History ==
=== The Evening Journal ===
The News began as The Evening Journal, with Vol. I No. I issued on 2 January 1869. From 11 September 1912 (Vol. XLVI No. 12,906), it was renamed The Journal.

News Limited was established in 1923 by James Edward Davidson, when he purchased the Broken Hill Barrier Miner and the Port Pirie Recorder. He then went on to purchase The Journal and Adelaide's weekly sports-focussed Mail in May 1923.

=== The News ===
On 24 July 1923, The Journal was renamed The News (restarting at Volume 1, Issue 1), with the Saturday edition being retained as The Saturday Journal (which continued to be published until 1929). In 1923, the new newspaper had a circulation of 30,000, and by 1953, it had a daily readership of 106,000. In early 1948, the regular format was changed from broadsheet to tabloid.

In 1933, a controlling stake was taken by The Advertiser and managed by The Herald and Weekly Times. HWT sold off its stake in 1949, allowing Sir Keith Murdoch to acquire a major interest in the company and to assume control of the paper in 1951. The News became the main asset passed upon his death in 1952 to his son Rupert Murdoch. It was the latter's first media interest and commenced the foundation of what was to become the international media conglomerate, News Corporation. On 6 February 1954, The Mail was renamed SA Sunday Mail and then Sunday Mail in 1955. On 28 August 1976, the final Saturday issue of The News was published.

Murdoch later acquired the city's other local newspaper, the morning daily broadsheet, The Advertiser, in 1987. Murdoch sold The News that year to Northern Star Holdings, and many of its journalists moved to The Advertiser. However, in the face of continuing losses brought about by the competition of television and the decline of use of public transport and given the more prominent existence of The Advertiser, The News (then Australia’s last evening newspaper) was stopped on 27 March 1992.

== See also ==
- List of newspapers in Australia
