= Royston Gabe-Jones =

Welsh rugby union player

Royston Gabe-Jones (born Arthur Royston Gabe-Jones; 25 November 1906 — 26 February 1965) was a Welsh cricketer. He was a right-handed batsman and a right-arm medium-pace bowler who played for Glamorgan. He was born in Clydach Vale, educated at Blundell's School and died in Cardiff.

When Gabe-Jones appeared in his only first-class cricket match in 1922, he became the youngest person to play county cricket in the 20th century, at the age of just 15 years and 9 months. The record was broken in June 2013, when Matthew Fisher made his debut against Leicestershire.

He played a single match for the team, against Leicestershire, and in the only innings in which he batted, finished on 6 not out. Gabe-Jones later played rugby for Cardiff RFC.
