= English cricket team in New Zealand in 2024–25 =

International cricket tour

- Crowe–Thorpe Trophy
	New Zealand	England
- Dates: 28 November – 18 December 2024
Captains	Tom Latham	Ben Stokes

Test series
- Result: England won the 3-match series 2–1
Most runs	Kane Williamson (395)	Harry Brook (350)
Most wickets	Matt Henry (15)	Brydon Carse (18)
- Player of the series: Harry Brook (Eng)

The England cricket team toured New Zealand in November and December 2024 to play three Test matches against New Zealand cricket team. The Test series formed part of the 2023–2025 ICC World Test Championship. In April 2024, the New Zealand Cricket (NZC) confirmed the full tour itinerary.

England won the series by 2–1, and thus claimed the maiden Crowe–Thorpe Trophy.

== Squads ==
New Zealand	England
Tom Latham (c); Tom Blundell (wk); Mark Chapman (Note: In squad for third Test only.); Devon Conway; Jacob Duffy; Matt Henry; Daryl Mitchell; William O'Rourke; Glenn Phillips; Rachin Ravindra; Mitchell Santner (Note: In squad for second and third Tests only.); Nathan Smith; Tim Southee; Kane Williamson; Will Young	Ben Stokes (c); Ollie Pope (vc, wk); Rehan Ahmed; Gus Atkinson; Shoaib Bashir; Jacob Bethell; Harry Brook; Brydon Carse; ~~Jordan Cox (wk)~~; Zak Crawley; Ben Duckett; Jack Leach; Matthew Potts; Ollie Robinson (wk); Joe Root; Olly Stone; Chris Woakes

On 24 November, Jordan Cox was ruled out of the series with a fractured right thumb, with Ollie Robinson added to the squad on 27 November as his replacement.

On 9 December, Devon Conway was ruled out of the third Test due to personal reason, and Mark Chapman added to the squad as his replacement.

== Tour match ==
23–24 November 2024
Scorecard

New Zealand Prime Minister's XI	v	England
136 (36.4 overs); Snehith Reddy 60 (82); Brydon Carse 4/48 (8.4 overs)		249 (45.1 overs); Zak Crawley 94 (90); Harjot Johal 3/25 (7 overs)
313/5d (68 overs); Troy Johnson 80 (115); Olly Stone 3/53 (11 overs)		196/9 (22 overs); Joe Root 82* (54); Yahya Zeb 2/24 (4 overs)

Match drawn
Sir John Davies Oval, Queenstown
Umpires: Cory Black (NZ) and Craig Pryor (NZ)

- England won the toss and elected to field.

== Test series ==
=== 1st Test ===
28 November – 2 December 2024
Scorecard

New Zealand	v	England
348 (91 overs); Kane Williamson 93 (197); Brydon Carse 4/64 (19 overs)		499 (103 overs); Harry Brook 171 (197); Matt Henry 4/84 (23 overs)
254 (74.1 overs); Daryl Mitchell 84 (167); Brydon Carse 6/42 (19.1 overs)		104/2 (12.4 overs); Jacob Bethell 50* (37); Matt Henry 1/12 (3 overs)

England won by 8 wickets
Hagley Oval, Christchurch
Umpires: Ahsan Raza (Pak) and Rod Tucker (Aus)
Player of the match: Brydon Carse (Eng)

- England won the toss and elected to field.
- Nathan Smith (NZ) and Jacob Bethell (Eng) both made their Test debuts.
- Joe Root (Eng) played in his 150th Test.
- Ollie Pope and Harry Brook (Eng) scored their 3,000th and 2,000th run respectively in Tests.
- Kane Williamson (NZ) scored his 9,000th run in Tests.
- Brydon Carse (Eng) took his maiden five-wicket haul and ten-wicket haul in Tests.
- World Test Championship points: England 9, New Zealand –3.

=== 2nd Test ===
6–8 December 2024
Scorecard

England	v	New Zealand
280 (54.4 overs); Harry Brook 123 (115); Nathan Smith 4/86 (11.4 overs)		125 (34.5 overs); Kane Williamson 37 (56); Gus Atkinson 4/31 (8.5 overs)
427/6d (82.3 overs); Joe Root 106 (130); Tim Southee 2/72 (14 overs)		259 (54.2 overs); Tom Blundell 115 (102); Ben Stokes 3/5 (2.2 overs)

England won by 323 runs
Basin Reserve, Wellington
Umpires: Adrian Holdstock (SA) and Rod Tucker (Aus)
Player of the match: Harry Brook (Eng)

- New Zealand won the toss and elected to field.
- Gus Atkinson (Eng) took a hat-trick with the final three wickets of New Zealand's first innings, the first hat-trick at this venue in Tests.
- The margin of victory was England's biggest in terms of runs against New Zealand.
- World Test Championship points: England 12, New Zealand 0.

=== 3rd Test ===
14–17 December 2024
Scorecard

New Zealand	v	England
347 (97.1 overs); Mitchell Santner 76 (117); Matthew Potts 4/90 (28.1 overs)		143 (35.4 overs); Joe Root 32 (42); Matt Henry 4/48 (13.4 overs)
453 (101.4 overs); Kane Williamson 156 (204); Jacob Bethell 3/72 (14.2 overs)		234 (47.2 overs); Jacob Bethell 76 (96); Mitchell Santner 4/85 (14.2 overs)

New Zealand won by 423 runs
Seddon Park, Hamilton
Umpires: Adrian Holdstock (SA) and Ahsan Raza (Pak)
Player of the match: Mitchell Santner (NZ)

- England won the toss and elected to field.
- The first session of play on Day 3 was lost due to rain.
- Tim Southee (NZ) played in his last Test match.
- Will Young (NZ), Rachin Ravindra (NZ), and Mitchell Santner (NZ) all scored their 1,000th run in Tests.
- New Zealand equalled their biggest Test win by margin of runs.
- World Test Championship points: New Zealand 12, England 0.
