= Test cricket =

Longest and original form of cricket

Men's Test cricket
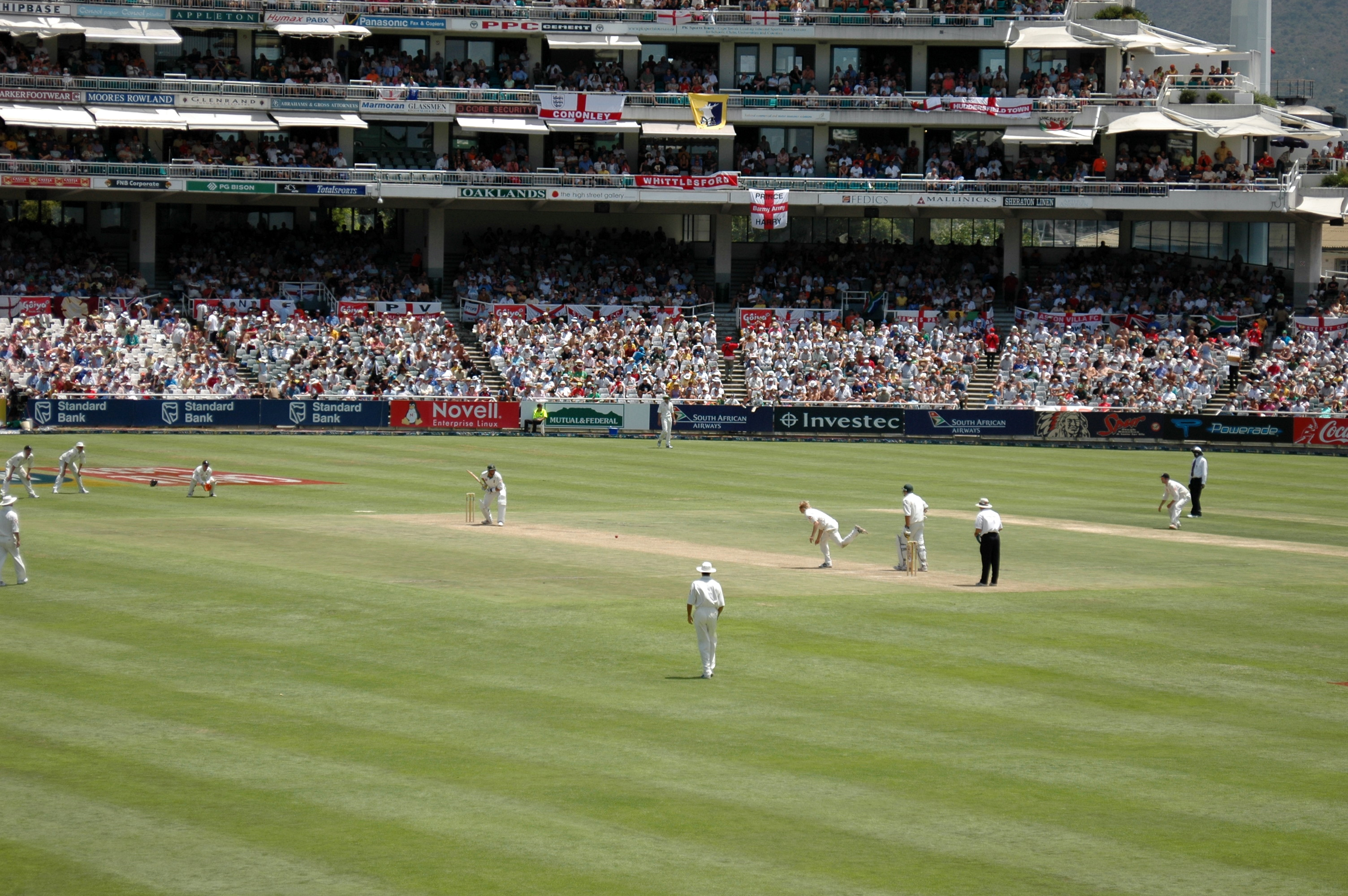
- A Test match between South Africa and England in January 2005. The two men wearing black trousers are the umpires. Test cricket is played in traditional white clothes and usually with a red ball – a pink ball in day/night Tests
- Highest governing body: International Cricket Council
- First played: 15 March 1877; 149 years ago

Characteristics
- Contact: No
- Team members: 11
- Mixed-sex: No
- Type: Outdoor, bat and ball
- Equipment: Bat, Ball, Stumps, Helmet, Pads, Other guards (thigh, abdominal, etc), Gloves, Wicket-keeper's gloves
- Venue: Cricket field

Presence
- Country or region: Worldwide

Test cricket is a format of the sport of cricket, considered the game's most prestigious and traditional form. Often referred to as the "ultimate test" of a cricketer's skill, endurance and temperament, it is a first-class format of international cricket where two teams in whites, each representing their country, compete over a match that can last up to five days. It consists of up to four innings (up to two per team), with a minimum of ninety overs scheduled to be bowled in six hours per day, making it the sport with the longest playing time except for some multi-stage cycling races. A team wins the match by outscoring the opposition with the bat and bowling them out with the ball. Otherwise the match ends in a draw.

It is contested by 12 teams which are the full-members of the International Cricket Council (ICC). The term "test match" was originally coined in 1861–62 but in a different context—that the English team was testing itself against all of the Australian colonies. Test cricket did not become an officially recognised format until the 1890s, but many international matches since 1877 have been retrospectively awarded Test status. The first such match took place at the Melbourne Cricket Ground (MCG) in March 1877 between teams which were then known as a Combined Australian XI and James Lillywhite's XI, the latter a team of visiting English professionals. Matches between Australia and England were first called "test matches" in 1892. The first definitive list of retrospective Tests was written by South Australian journalist Clarence P. Moody two years later and, by the end of the century, had gained acceptance.

Traditionally, Test matches had always been played with a red ball during daylight hours. However, amid growing concern over dwindling viewership in the late 2000s, numerous trials were held in the early 2010s which culminated in day/night Tests being permitted by the ICC in 2012, and the first day/night match was between Australia and New Zealand at the Adelaide Oval in November 2015. These matches start later in the day and continue into the evening, necessitating the use of a pink ball to aid visibility.

The ICC World Test Championship is the international championship of Test cricket. It is a league competition run by the ICC, with its inaugural season starting in 2019. In line with the ICC's goal of having one pinnacle tournament for each of the three formats of international cricket, it is the premier championship for Test cricket.

== Early history ==
=== Growth of international cricket ===
Teams designated as "England" or "All England" began to play in the 18th century, but these teams were not truly representative. Early international cricket was disrupted by the French Revolution and the American Civil War. The earliest international cricket match was between the United States and Canada, on 24 and 26 September 1844 (bad weather prevented play on the 25th). Overseas tours by national English teams began in 1859 with visits to North America, Australia and New Zealand. The 1868 Australian Aboriginals were the first organised overseas team to tour England.

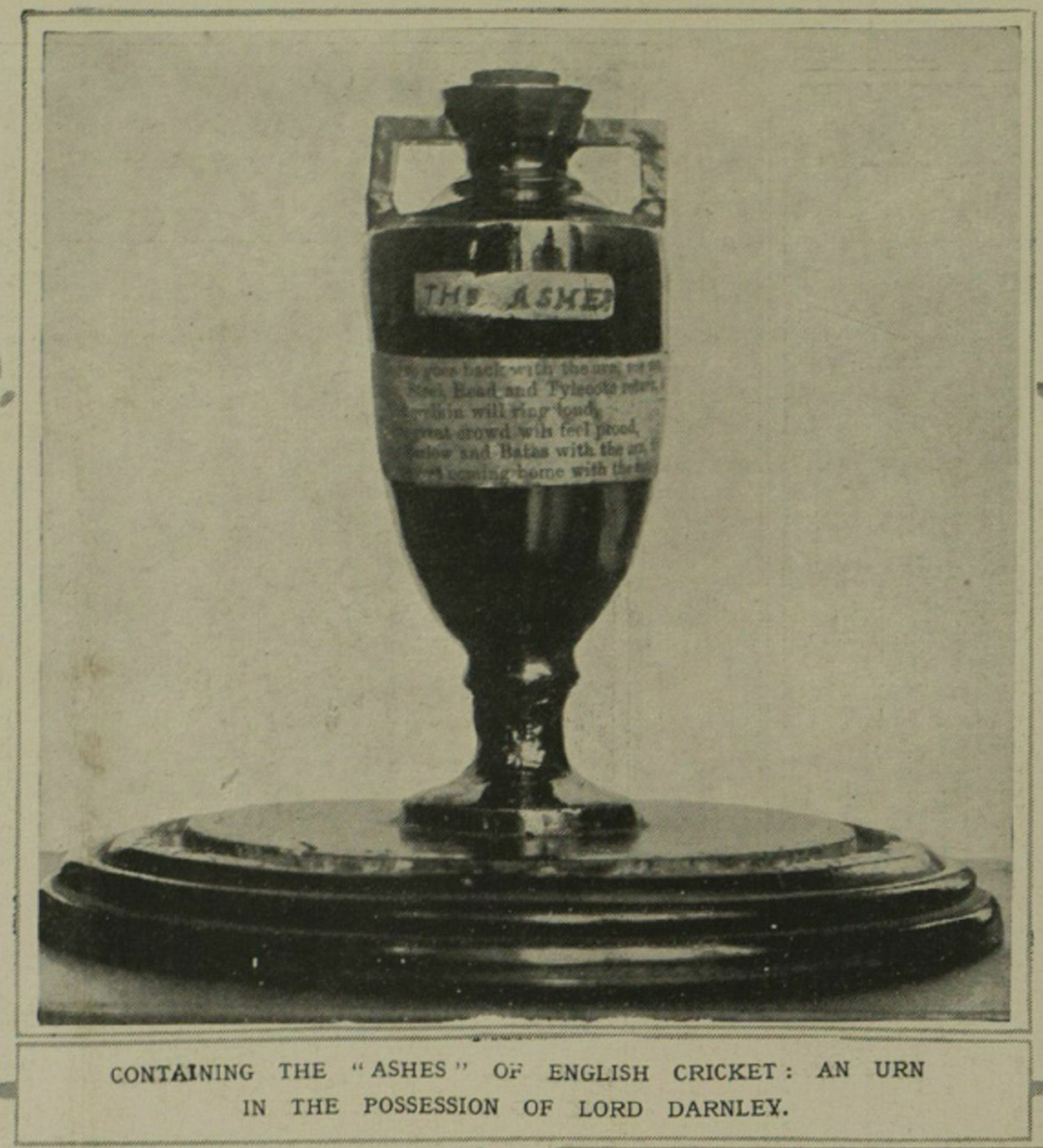
The earliest published photo of the Ashes urn, from The Illustrated London News, 1921

Two rival English tours of Australia were proposed in the early months of 1877, with James Lillywhite campaigning for a professional tour and Fred Grace for an amateur one. Grace's tour fell through and it was Lillywhite's team that toured New Zealand and Australia in 1876–77. Two matches against a combined Australian XI were later classified as the first official Test matches. The first match was won by Australia, by 45 runs and the second by England. After reciprocal tours established a pattern of international cricket, The Ashes was established as a competition during the Australian tour of England in 1882. A surprise victory for Australia inspired a mock obituary of English cricket to be published in the Sporting Times the following day: the phrase "The body shall be cremated and the ashes taken to Australia" prompted the subsequent creation of the Ashes urn.

The series of 1884–85 was the first to be held over five matches: England player Alfred Shaw, writing in 1901, considered the side to be "the best ever to have left England". South Africa became the third team to play Test cricket in 1888–89, when they hosted a tour by an under-strength England side. Australia, England and South Africa were the only countries playing Test cricket before World War I.

=== Terminology ===
The term "test match" was coined during the English tour of Australia in 1861–62 but in a different context. It meant that the English team was testing itself against each of the Australian colonies. Following Lillywhite's tour, Australian teams reciprocated, beginning with Dave Gregory's team in 1878. By the beginning of 1892, eight English teams had visited Australia and seven Australian teams had visited England. In its issue of 25 February 1892, Cricket: A Weekly Record of the Game revived the term "test match" and freely applied it to the three international matches which had just been played in Australia by Lord Sheffield's XI, starting with the match at the MCG which was billed as Lord Sheffield's Team v Combined Australia. The report began: "There was no little appropriateness in fixing the first of the three great test matches for January 1".

=== Clarence P. Moody ===
The first list of matches considered to be "Tests" was conceived and published by South Australian journalist Clarence P. Moody in his 1894 book, Australian Cricket and Cricketers, 1856 to 1893–94. Moody's proposal was well received by Charles W. Alcock, editor of Cricket in England and his list of 39 matches was reproduced in the 28 December 1894 issue as part of an article entitled "The First Test Match". The list begins with the MCG match played 15–17 March 1877 and ends with the recent match at the Association Ground, Sydney played 14–20 December 1894. All 39 were retrospectively recognised as Test matches, as was the unlisted 1890 Old Trafford match that was abandoned without a ball being bowled. No South African matches were included in Moody's list but three against England were also given retrospective Test status. Moody became a newspaper editor and founded the Adelaide Sunday Mail in 1912.

== Twentieth century ==
=== Further growth and creation of the Imperial Cricket Conference (ICC) ===
Growth of Tests continued, with 48 being played from 1901 to 1910. The Imperial Cricket Conference (ICC) was founded on 15 July 1909, with England, Australia and South Africa as the founding members. The ICC included the Marylebone Cricket Club (MCC), the Australian Board of Control for International Cricket, and the South African Cricket Association as its original associations. The ICC would oversee and regulate cricket between these three countries. The President and Secretary of the MCC subsequently became the President and Secretary of the ICC. Lord's, the home of the MCC, hence became the headquarters of the ICC. At their 1909 meeting, the ICC instigated a triangular tournament to be held between the three countries in 1912. The nine-match tournament was marred by rain, and combined with the three-day match length for Tests in England at the time meant six of the matches resulted in draws. The tournament was so unsuccessful that the idea was never attempted again. The Daily Telegraph noted: "Nine Tests provide a surfeit of cricket, and contests between Australia and South Africa are not a great attraction to the British public."

There were only 24 Tests between 1911 and 1920, including the nine as part of the 1912 Triangular Tournament, owing to the disruption caused by World War I. When Test cricket resumed after the war, England was the first to tour Australia as part of the 1920–21 Ashes Series, who were whitewashed by Australia for the first time in a Test series. England were required to quarantine before the series due to an outbreak of typhus on their ship, and also had injuries to key players, which disrupted their preparation. After the conclusion of the series, England's captain Johnny Douglas congratulated the Australians "who have whacked us, well."

The ICC held a second meeting in 1921 which focused on the use of eight-ball overs.

=== Admission of India, New Zealand and West Indies ===
India, New Zealand and West Indies were invited to attend the ICC's third meeting on 31 May 1926, and subsequently became full members on the same day. At the meeting, it was agreed that the membership of the ICC should comprise "governing bodies of cricket in countries within the Empire to which cricket teams are sent, or which send teams to England." This definition regrettably excluded the United States, which had regularly received teams from England since 1859 and had also sent several teams to play in England. The meeting also discussed the "farcical" limit of three days for Tests, and it was unanimously agreed to establish an allotment of "more than three days for tests [sic] in England, which should be played out if possible." The MCC representatives confirmed that the English counties would be consulted in regard to the Australian proposal that at least four days should be permitted for Test matches. The meeting further discussed the use of eight-ball overs, and heard that all the State Cricket Associations in Australia had been consulted by the Australian Board of Control, with a unanimous decision that the eight-ball over was in the best interests of the game.

From this point onward, the ICC met "on an almost annual basis" except during war years, to set out future Test tours, checking that players were properly qualified, and encouraging the use of turf instead of matting pitches. Possible law changes were also discussed.

West Indies toured England for their Test debut on 23 June 1928 against England at Lord's as part of a three-Test series. England won each match batting only once, with the West Indies being largely outplayed. However they had shown their huge potential in a series of reciprocal tours in the previous decade.

New Zealand made their Test debut on 10 January 1930 at Lancaster Park as England toured New Zealand for a three-Test series. Due a quirk of scheduling the series between previously agreed tours (Australia in 1928–29 & 1932–33 and South Africa in 1930–31), England was also playing a four-Test series against the West Indies at the same time. Due to the third Test of the England-New Zealand series being affected by rain, a fourth was arranged to start on 21 February 1930 at Eden Park. The third Test of the England-West Indies series also began on the same day at Bourda. It was the only time one country has played in two Test matches on the same day. England won the New Zealand series 1–0, with three draws.

The fourth Test of the England-West Indies series was timeless. England made 849 from 259 overs in the first innings, with Andy Sandham scoring 325, then the world record score; it was also the first Test triple century. England bowled the West Indies out for 286 from 111.5 overs, establishing a first-innings lead of 563. England's captain, Calthorpe, was criticised for not enforcing the follow-on, but the age of his side was likely a major factor. England thus batted again, notching 272 from 79.1 overs before declaring 9 wickets down. With time seemingly unlimited, the West Indies were set 836 to win. At the close of play on the seventh day, they had scored 408 runs for the loss of five wickets, but two days of rain followed. As was the case with the infamous Durban match in 1939, England's ship was departing and the game had to finish a draw.

India toured England for their debut in Tests on 25 June 1932. England won the only Test by 158 runs.

=== Changes to the size of the wicket ===
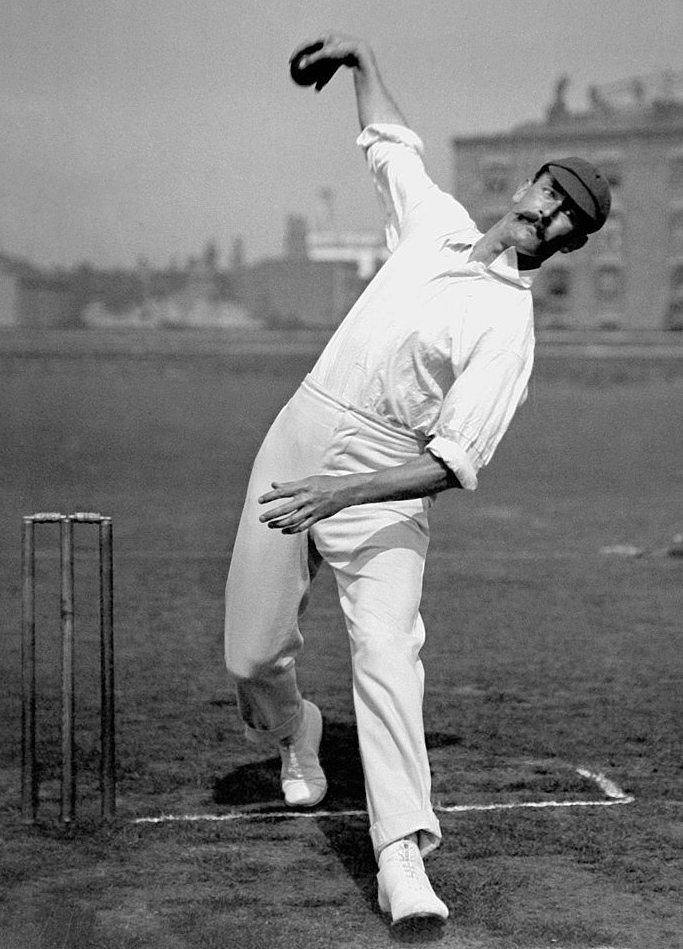
Reggie Schwarz in c. 1905 showing the smaller wicket

In 1931, provisions were added to Law 6 in the Laws of Cricket to alter the size of the wicket (stumps and bails). The text was changed from the 1927 version which was as follows:

Each wicket shall be eight inches in width and consist of three stumps, with two bails upon the top. The stumps shall be of equal and sufficient size to prevent the ball from passing through, twenty-seven inches out of the ground.

In the 1931 revision, the relevant text was as follows:

Each wicket shall be not less than eight inches and no more than nine inches in width and consist of three stumps, with two bails upon the top. The stumps shall be of equal and sufficient size to prevent the ball from passing through, not less than twenty-seven inches nor more than twenty-eight inches out of the ground.

Later, Law 6, which became Law 8, was standardised in the 1947 revision to the larger size as follows:

Each Wicket shall be 9 inches in width and consist of three stumps with two bails upon the top. The stumps shall be of equal and of sufficient size to prevent the ball from passing through, with their top 28 inches above the ground.

=== The genesis and outlawing of bodyline ===
==== 1930 Ashes series ====
After Bradman scored 974 runs at an average of 139.14 (with four centuries – 131, 254, 334 and 232) in the 1930 Ashes series in England, the most runs ever scored in a series—a record that still stands to this day, the English sought to curtail his impact. In the timeless 5th Test where he made 232, a number of English players and commentators had noted Bradman's discomfort in playing the short, rising delivery. The observation was made too late to have an impact on the match, which Australia won by an innings and 39 runs, which also meant Australia won the series 2–1. Wisden made of a period of play:

On the Wednesday morning the ball flew about a good deal, both batsmen frequently being hit on the body ... on more than one occasion each player cocked the ball up dangerously but always, as it happened, just wide of the fieldsmen.

The revelation provided England with a possible tactic for the next Ashes series in Australia in 1932–33. England's new captain, Douglas Jardine, along with his bowlers, devised and practised a plan in the 1932 season called "fast leg theory" which later became known as bodyline. It involved bowling at leg stump or just outside, and pitching the ball short, so that once bounced it reared up threateningly at the body of a batsman standing in an orthodox batting position. Fielders positioned on the leg side would catch any defensive deflection off the bat. The batsman's options were limited as pull or hook shots could be caught on the boundary and defensive shots brought few runs and could carry far enough to the keeper or leg-side fielders. Other options included evading the ball through ducking or moving aside, or allowing the ball to strike the body.

==== 1932–33 Ashes series ====
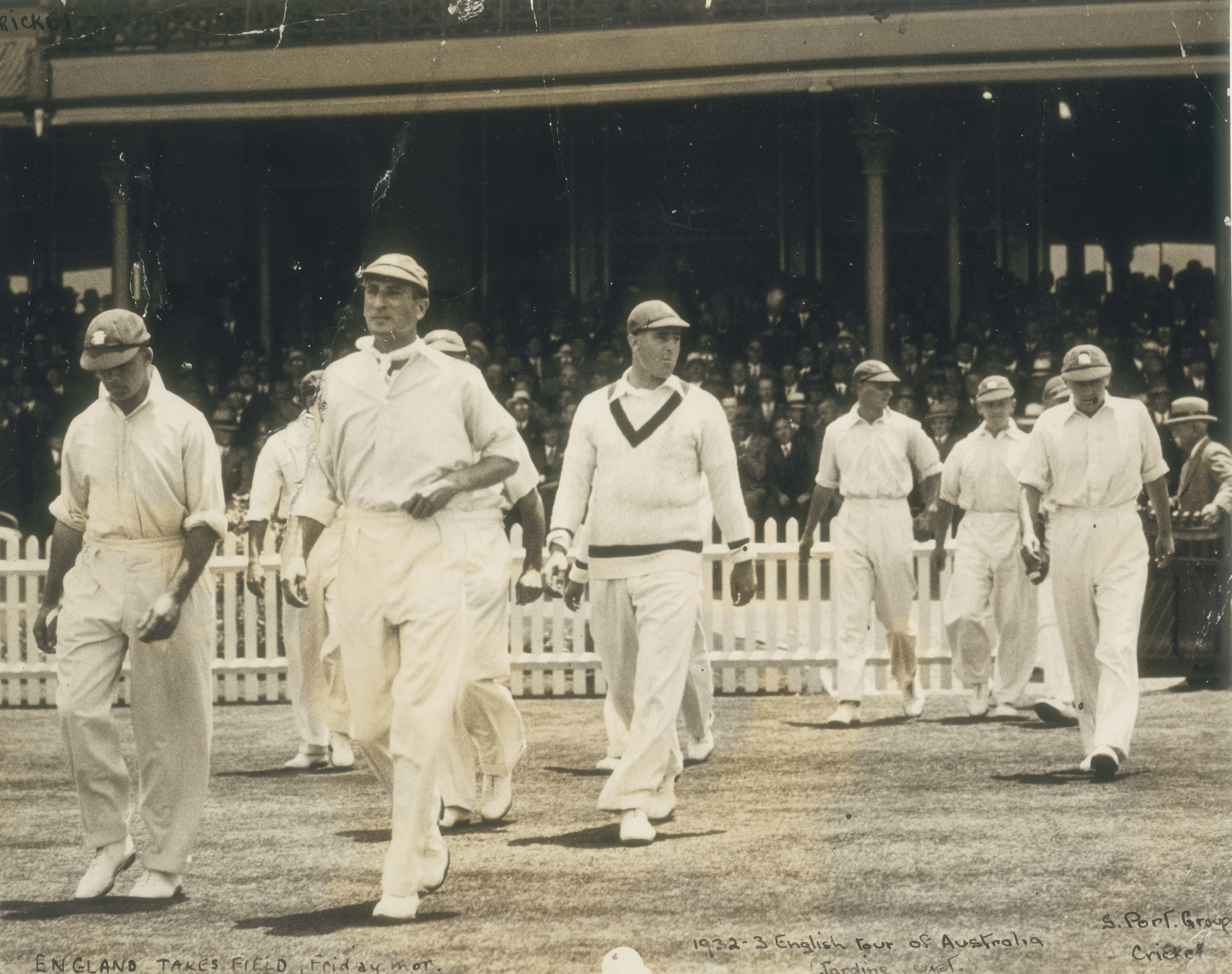
Jardine leads the English Team onto the Sydney Cricket Ground, 2 December 1932

England employed bodyline in the 1932–33 series, with the tactic causing huge controversy due to its unsportsmanlike nature and restriction of scoring options. In the third Test at Adelaide, a spell of bowling from Harold Larwood saw Bill Woodfull struck over the heart. He dropped his bat, and staggered away holding his chest, bent over in pain. Jardine called to Larwood: "Well bowled, Harold!". Although the comment was aimed at unsettling Bradman, who was also batting at the time, Woodfull was appalled. Play later resumed when Woodfull was fit to continue, and Allen bowled the next over. Play was again stopped for Larwood's next over when the players were moved into bodyline positions, as the crowd protested and called abuse at the England team. Many commentators condemned the field change as unsporting, and the furious spectators became extremely volatile.

Following the fourth day's play at Adelaide, the Australian Board of Control sent a telegraph to the MCC, cricket's ruling body and the club that selected the England team. The Australian Board had claimed bodyline was unsportsmanlike and that the bowling was menacing the best interests of the game. Meanwhile, the match continued and saw England bowled out for 412 on day five, setting Australia a target of 532 to win. Australia only had significant contributions from Woodfull, 73 from 208 balls, Bradman, 66 from 71 balls, and Vic Richardson, 21 from 76 balls, as they were bowled out for 193 inside 70 overs on the sixth day. England were 2–1 up in the series.

The MCC replied to the first telegraph the following week, deeply resenting the accusation of unsportsmanlike bowling. Additionally, members of the MCC believed that the Australians had over-reacted to the English bowling. At this point, the remainder of the series was under threat.

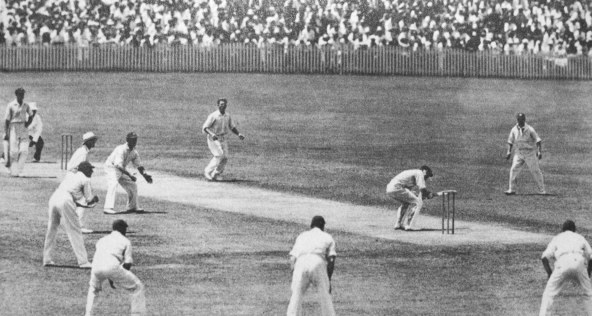
Bill Woodfull evades a bodyline ball

The Australian Board then sent another cable on 30 January, indicating that they wished the series to continue and offering to postpone consideration of the fairness of bodyline bowling until after the series. The MCC replied on 2 February, suggesting that continuing the series would be impossible unless the accusation of unsporting behaviour was withdrawn. The affair rose to the political level, and it was believed that it could have a significant trade impact between the two nations. The standoff was settled when the Australian prime minister, Joseph Lyons, met with members of the Australian Board and outlined to them the severe economic hardships that could be caused in Australia if the British public boycotted Australian trade. Following considerable discussion and debate in the English and Australian press, the Australian Board sent a cable to the MCC which, while maintaining its opposition to bodyline bowling, stated "We do not regard the sportsmanship of your team as being in question". Correspondence between the Australian Board and the MCC continued for almost a year.

In the final two Tests, England continued employing bodyline tactics but to a lesser extent than the first three. England won the remaining two matches of the series and thus won the series 4–1. Regarding Bradman, he had his leanest run tally in a series with 396 at an average of 56.57, with just one century and three half centuries.

==== Continued use ====
Bodyline continued to be bowled occasionally in the 1933 English season, most notably by Nottinghamshire, who had Carr, Voce and Larwood in their team.

When the West Indies toured England in 1933, their captain Jackie Grant decided to use bodyline against the English for the first time. The match was drawn, but played a significant part in turning English opinion against bodyline. The Times used the word bodyline, without using inverted commas or using the qualification so-called, for the first time. Wisden wrote that "most of those watching it for the first time must have come to the conclusion that, while strictly within the law, it was not nice."

In 1934, Bill Woodfull led Australia back to England in a tour that had been under a cloud since the previous Ashes series. Jardine had retired from International cricket in early 1934 after captaining a fraught tour of India and under England's new captain, Bob Wyatt, agreements were put in place so that bodyline would not be used. However, there were occasions when the Australians felt that their hosts had crossed the mark with tactics resembling bodyline. In a match between the Australians and Nottinghamshire, Voce, one of the bodyline bowlers in 1932–33 again used the tactics. Woodfull told the Nottinghamshire administrators that, if Voce's leg-side bowling was repeated, his men would leave the field and return to London. He further said that Australia would not return to the country in the future.

==== Outlawing ====
Originally, the MCC hoped that captains would ensure that the game was played in the correct spirit, and passed a resolution that bodyline bowling would breach this spirit. When this proved to be insufficient, the MCC passed a law for the 1935 English cricket season, that "direct attack" bowling was unfair and became the responsibility of the umpires to identify and stop. Later, in 1957, the Laws were altered to prevent more than two fielders standing behind square on the leg side; the intention was to prevent negative bowling tactics whereby off spinners and slow inswing bowlers aimed at the leg stump of batsmen with fielders concentrated on the leg side. However, an indirect effect was to make bodyline fields impossible to implement.

Later law changes, under the heading of "Intimidatory Short Pitched Bowling", also restricted the number of "bouncers" which could be bowled in an over.

=== End of timeless Tests ===
There were 99 timeless Tests between 1877 and 1939. Of these, five were held in England, two in South Africa, one in the West Indies, with the remaining ninety-one being held in Australia. All Tests in Australia were timeless prior to World War II. The Australian climate combined with groundskeepers leaving the pitch uncovered and watering the pitch well meant pitches would dry out and crack as the match progressed, often making batting difficult by days four or five. Only two timeless Tests in Australia were drawn, both against England in 1882, when the matches had to be left unfinished due to shipping schedules.

Timeless Tests were sometimes used outside Australia if the series result depended on the outcome of the match. This happened in Kingston in 1930 when the Fourth (and final) Test between West Indies and England lasted for seven playing days and had to be abandoned owing to shipping schedules. The fifth and final Test at The Oval in 1938 was also timeless, as England batted for the first two and a half days and made 903 for 7, before declaring and dismissing Australia twice by the end of the fourth day.

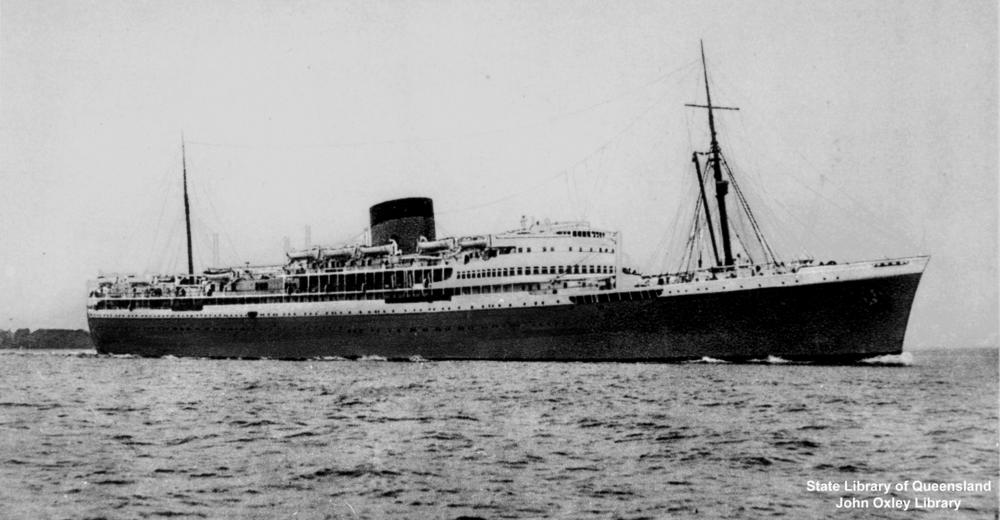
The Athlone Castle, the ship England needed to catch

The fifth and final Test at Durban in 1938–39 between South Africa and England was also timeless. The infamous match was spread over twelve days with nine days of actual play – including two rest days and one day with no play. The match started on Friday 3 March 1939. South Africa batted first and were bowled out for 530 on Monday 6 March, with the Sunday having been a rest day. In reply England were bowled out on Wednesday, 8 March for 316. South Africa extended their lead with 481 in their second innings, as they batted for another two days, setting England a target of 696 to win. England were 0/0 at stumps on Thursday 9 March. At stumps on Friday 10 March, England had reached 253 for the loss of just one wicket. There was no play on Saturday, and Sunday was a rest day. They resumed on Monday, reaching 496 for the loss of three wickets. By 14 March 1939, they had reached 654 for the loss of five wickets in the fourth innings (the highest ever first-class fourth innings score) but the match had to remain unfinished as England's had to catch a train to Cape Town where their boat home was due to depart. The match had not been expected to take more than five days, but rain and rolling rejuvenated the pitch three times during the match, and it was still in good condition for batting when the match was abandoned.

The South Africans suggested that England could make alternative travel arrangements, to allow the match to be finished the next day. Hammond had had enough and disagreed. And so the match was called off. He remarked in his final speech: “I don’t think timeless Test matches are in the best interests of the game, and I sincerely hope that the last one has been played.” Wisden noted: "the limitless match we now believe to be dead."

Timeless Tests were never scheduled after World War II, owing to the scheduling difficulties of matches that could continue indefinitely, and the comparative dullness of the play.

=== Admission of Pakistan ===
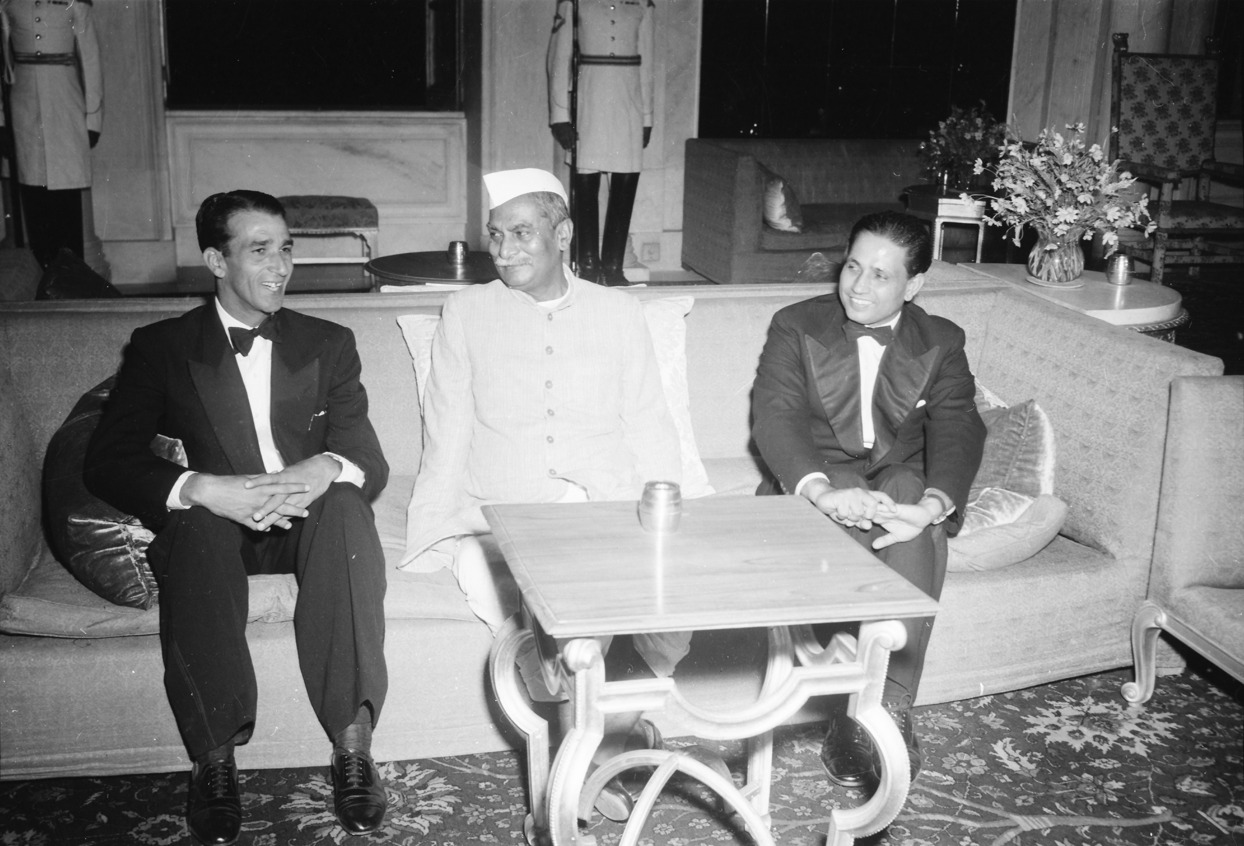
Captains Abdul Kardar (left) and Lala Amarnath (right) with Indian President Rajendra Prasad (centre) on the day of the first test, 16 October 1952

On 28 July 1952, Pakistan were admitted to the ICC, and in October that year played their first Test match. Almost 30 years passed until the next member (Sri Lanka) joined.

=== Five Day Tests in England ===
In 1948, matches in England were scheduled over five days for the first time. Most matches from 1880 to 1949 were three days, and from 1950 all matches were scheduled for five days except for the 2019 Test between England and Ireland (which was four days) and final matches of series in 1953, 1972 and 1975, which were six days. The World Test Championship final in 2021 was scheduled for five days with a reserve day, which was used after the first day was lost to rain.

On 8 March 1955, the ICC made the following decision at their meeting:

In future all members of the Imperial Cricket Conference visiting England will play five five-day Test Matches. This will bring India, West Indies, New Zealand and Pakistan into line for the first time with Australia and South Africa.

=== Advent of covered pitches ===
Various levels of "covering" existed through the history of cricket, from the Laws in 1884—"The ground shall not be rolled, watered, covered, mown, or beaten during a match, except before the commencement of each innings and of each day’s play." This phrasing remained until the 1947 Laws, which stated the pitch should not be covered "unless special regulations so provide". These Laws also permitted covering the run-ups to the pitch. The next edition of the Laws, in 1980, allowed for "complete covering of the pitch" before a match, but not during "unless prior arrangement or regulations so provide."

The main issue with uncovered pitches was that it produced "sticky wickets", which occurred after rain, while the pitch was drying, especially when this happened quickly. On a genuine sticky wicket, players could expect the ball to turn sharply with just a small amount of spin on the ball. Some balls might deviate a significant amount, while others would skid through. There was also often extremely uneven bounce.

Leaving pitches uncovered also meant rain would cause huge delays while the ground dried out enough to permit play. The loss of time and gate money was of huge concern to administrators, especially those with precarious finances.

Due to several wet summers, after much discussion, from the beginning of the 1959 season, full covering was made compulsory for County cricket and Test matches. The entire pitch had to be covered every evening and on Sundays, it also had to be covered whenever play was abandoned due to rain. The only instance where pitches were not covered was when players came off due to rain but play was not abandoned.

From the 1960s and 70s, uncovered pitches across the world began to be phased out. In 1960, the first full covering during a Test was used in England. However, regulations were sometimes vague and even contradictory. The final changes came in the 1970s. In 1979, Test matches in England had total pitch covering during rain. The end of sticky wickets came in 1981 when the same full covering was enforced in all English first-class matches.

After these changes, pitches became more standardised across the world, although differences still remained between countries and even between venues, due to the type of soil used and the local climate.

=== Imperial Cricket Conference renamed International Cricket Conference ===
On 15 July 1965, the Imperial Cricket Conference renamed itself the International Cricket Conference and countries from all over the world could be admitted, instead of only commonwealth countries. Despite this, it was still run as an exclusive club by English cricket–the MCC president was the ICC president and the MCC secretary was the ICC secretary.

=== Suspension of South Africa (1970–1991) ===
==== Apartheid ====
Globally, tensions were rising throughout the 1960s against the apartheid regime of the South African government. Sporting boycotts due to the regime were enacted in the 1960s as countries across the world showed their condemnation of racial segregation. South Africa left the Commonwealth of Nations in 1961, and per the rules of the time, therefore had to leave the ICC.

==== D'Oliveira affair ====
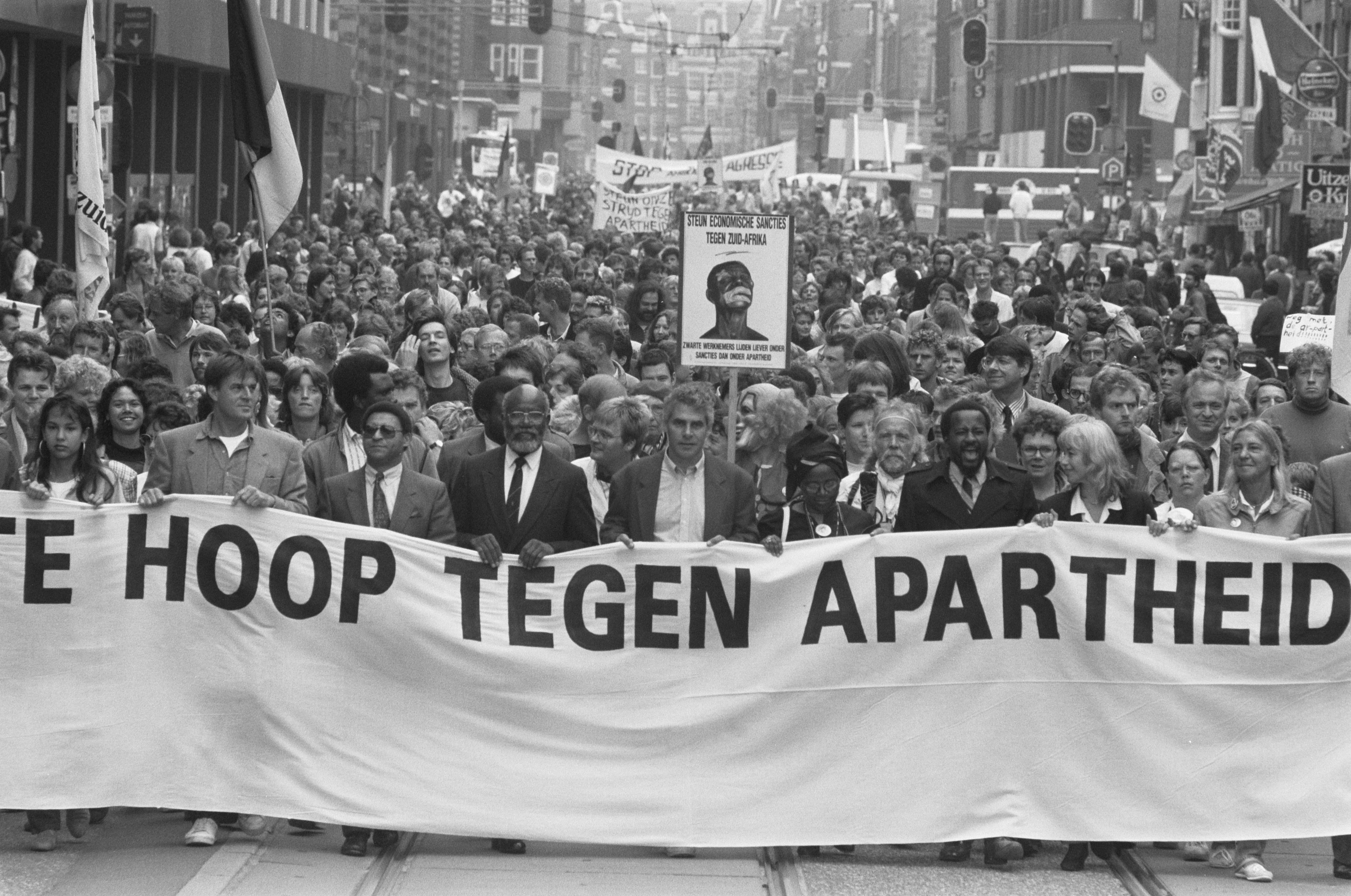
Anti-apartheid protest in Amsterdam, 1988

In 1968, Basil d'Oliveira, a mixed-race South African player who had represented England since 1966, was prohibited from playing by the South African government, in a development known as the D'Oliveira affair. The British prime minister at the time, Harold Wilson remarked: "Once the South Africans had said that they were not taking a player [d'Oliveira] we wanted to send, I would have rather thought that put them beyond the pale of civilized cricket." Due to the affair, the English tour of South Africa was cancelled.

==== Cancelled 1970 tour ====
Eighteen months later, South Africa was due to tour England as part of the 1970 season, and the public was growing discontent with the prospect of the tour, meanwhile the game's administrators remained steadfast in its determination that the tour should go ahead. Minutes of several meetings of the ICC and MCC showed they were much more concerned with the upcoming metrication in the UK and subsequent changing of the pitch length from 22 yards to 20.12 metres, and the weight of the ball from 5.5 ounces to 155.8 grams. On 12 December 1969, the Test and County Cricket Board (the precursor to the ECB) confirmed the tour would proceed, adding it was "averse to racial discrimination of any kind ... and respected the right of those who wish to demonstrate peacefully." However, at that stage protests had escalated from being peaceful. By the end of January 1970, twelve county grounds had been vandalised.

On 30 January, the International Cavaliers, a touring charity-based multi-racial cricket team, had been refused entry to South Africa. A letter from the South African Cricket Association ended with "you must be aware any tour ... including non-white personnel would not be allowed." The MCC tried to distance itself from the situation, claiming that the Cavaliers were a private organisation; this only served to make itself appear woefully out of touch with the world.

By mid-February, the MCC had cut the schedule from 28 to 11 matches, as they removed grounds seen as impossible to protect. They even permitted laying of artificial pitches on grounds hosting games, in order to allow play to continue if they were vandalised during play. Both pro and anti-tour letters were sent to newspapers as the tour grew closer, with players and officials taking stances for or against. Some journalists refused to commentate on any of the games; one, John Arlott, said that while he was not sure protests at games were the answer, he felt that by allowing the tour to go ahead the ICC had put cricket in a position where it would be "the ultimate and inevitable sufferer" and that the Tests "would offer comfort and confirmation to a completely evil regime."

==== Ban ====
In April, Harold Wilson told the BBC that the MCC had made "a big mistake" in allowing the tour to happen. "Everyone should be free to demonstrate against apartheid ... I hope people will feel free to do so." In early May, the annual meeting of the MCC backed the tour without requiring a vote. Later, Warwickshire said they wouldn't pick any of their three coloured players for the match against the South Africans. The following day the gates at Edgbaston were vandalised. On 20 May 12 days before the first match, the ICC voted almost unanimously for the tour to go ahead. "It was agreed in the long term this policy was in the best interests of cricket, and of cricketers of all races in South Africa," proclaimed secretary Billy Griffith. Despite this, the ICC stated there would be no further series involving South Africa "until SA cricket is played and teams selected on a multi-racial basis." An editorial in the Daily Mirror wrote: "The rulers of cricket stonewall on ... if this is their last word, they are assuming a terrible responsibility." On 22 May, the ICC called the tour off "with great regret", following a strongly worded official request from James Callaghan, the British home secretary. Griffith said he "regretted the discourtesy" to the South African board and further said he "deplored the activities of those who intimidate."

Inside the British government, there were fears the tour would cause racial unrest within the country, and allowing the tour to carry on could only harm Wilson's chances of re-election. John Vorster, South Africa's prime minister was furious. "For a government to submit so easily and so willingly to open blackmail is to me unbelievable." Ali Bacher, South Africa's captain was more reserved: "I regret the manner in which politics have become involved in cricket ... [but] unless we broaden our outlook we will remain forever in isolation." That isolation lasted longer than anyone feared as the ICC's members voted to suspend South Africa indefinitely from international cricket at their meeting.

==== Rebel tours ====
Following the ban from the ICC, rebel tours took place in the 1980s, in spite of the express disapproval of the national cricket boards and governments, the ICC, and international organisations such as the United Nations They were the subject of enormous controversy and remain a sensitive topic in the cricket world. Many players from various countries were banned for some years for their involvement in the rebel tours. The English cricket side that toured South Africa in 1981–82 became known as "The Dirty Dozen".

==== Re-admission ====
In 1991, the ICC re-admitted South Africa at the personal request of Nelson Mandela, ending the 22 year ban.

=== 6-ball over standardised globally ===
During the first 100 years of Test cricket, the number of balls per over ranged between 4 and 8. While matches in England had used 6-ball overs since 1946, and in South Africa since 1961–62, Pakistan, New Zealand and Australia had used 8-ball overs for several years. In 1978–79, Pakistan switched to 6-ball overs, and Australia and New Zealand switched the following season from 1979–80, standardising over length globally.

There is no recorded reason for the switching between four, five, six, and eight ball overs in the formative years of cricket, however it is understood that the shortness of four and five-ball overs meant there were too many over changes during the course of the day, and also made it difficult for bowlers to get into a rhythm to plot a dismissal. Eight-ball overs were used in Australia in an attempt to get more balls bowled in a day's play due to the reduction in change-overs. However, a downside was that bowlers would slow down in self preservation. The ICC permitted both 6-ball and 8-ball overs in the Laws, depending on the conditions of play in the host country. From the 2000 Laws, only 6-ball overs were permitted.

It is widely believed that with the commercialisation of cricket and the Packer revolution, there was no room left for the 8-ball over and the 6-ball over provided a happy balance between over changes and rhythm for the bowlers.

=== Admission of Sri Lanka and Zimbabwe, and further changes to the ICC ===
On 21 July 1981, Sri Lanka was admitted by the ICC as a full member, becoming the eighth Test playing nation. They played their first Test match against England at P. Sara Oval, Colombo on 17 February 1982.

In July 1989, the International Cricket Conference renamed itself to the International Cricket Council. In the same year, the practice of the MCC President automatically assuming the chairmanship of the ICC came to an end, though with the election of Colin Cowdrey, was still led by an Englishman. The renamed organisation had more teeth; it was no longer confined to just making recommendations to national governing bodies, but could impose binding decisions on members.

In July 1992, Zimbabwe was admitted by the ICC as a full member, becoming the ninth Test playing nation. They played their first Test match in October that year, against India at Harare Sports Club.

1993 saw the creation of the Chief Executive of ICC, to which David Richards of the Australian Cricket Board was appointed. With his appointment, the practice of the MCC's secretary performing the same function for the ICC came to an end.

=== Television replays, return of South Africa, neutral umpires and admission of Bangladesh ===
The Indian tour of South Africa in 1992–93 marked the first use of television replays in Test cricket, and was also the first Test series played by South Africa after their ban by the ICC 23 years previous. The tour was also known for the trialling of independent umpires. Television replays were used to settle "awkward line decisions" which morphed into the third umpire provision. Sachin Tendulkar was the first player to be given out, run out, by the third umpire.

By 1995, it had been agreed that television replays should be available in Tests "wherever possible" and that the third umpire should signal out with a red light, and not out with a green light (Tendulkar was given out with a green light in the first Test at Durban in November 1992.)

In 1996, cameras were also permitted to check whether a ball had crossed the boundary, and in 1997, umpires could call on the third umpire to check if a catch was clean or not.

Test Match Playing Conditions in 1998–99 contained the following rules:

The third Umpire will officiate in regard to TV replays only when the Umpires on the field have referred a decision to him in regard to hit wicket, run out, caught or stumping appeals.

Either the on field or third umpire shall be entitled to call for a TV replay to assist him in making a decision about whether the fieldsman had any part of his person in contact with the ball when he touched or crossed the boundary line or whether a four or six had been scored (refer to Regulation of ICC Full Members, Clause 2).

Michael Atherton, opening batsman for England, said after he was given out (caught) by the third umpire in the third Test in Adelaide in 1998: "In my opinion the third umpire should be restricted to line decisions [run outs, stumpings and boundaries]. What people are looking for from a third umpire is 100 per cent correct decision-making, but that's a Utopia that cannot exist. There's often doubt about non-line decisions made by the third umpire. There is no substitute at the end of the day for the player's word out in the middle and the two umpire's control of the decision making process."

On 26 June 2000, Bangladesh were granted Test status, and played their first match on 1 November 2000.

== Twenty-first century ==
=== Expansion of neutral umpires and relocation of the ICC ===
After the trial of one neutral umpire per Test in 1992, two neutrals were made mandatory in 2002, beginning with India’s tour of the West Indies.

In 2005, after months of speculation, the ICC relocated from Lord’s to Dubai. Tax advantages were cited as one of the reasons for the move.

=== Introduction of the Decision Review System ===
A Player Referral system was first tested in an India v. Sri Lanka match in 2008, and was officially launched by the ICC on 24 November 2009, during the first Test between New Zealand and Pakistan at the University Oval in Dunedin. It later became known as the Decision Review System.

=== Introduction of day/night Tests ===
Amid growing concern over dwindling viewership in the late 2000s, numerous trials were held in the early 2010s which culminated in day/night Tests being permitted by the ICC in 2012, and the first day/night match was between Australia and New Zealand at the Adelaide Oval in November 2015. These matches start later in the day and continue into the evening, necessitating the use of a pink ball to aid in visibility.

=== Admission of Afghanistan and Ireland ===
On 22 June 2017, Afghanistan and Ireland were granted Test status. Ireland played their first Test on 11 May 2018, while Afghanistan played their first Test 14 June 2018.

=== Introduction of the World Test Championship ===
After years of delays and cancelled tournaments, the World Test Championship was inaugurated in 2019 to offer a competition for the highest level of the game. Nine of the twelve Test playing nations participated, with New Zealand winning the final by 8 wickets over India.

== Test status ==
Test matches are the highest level of cricket, played between national representative teams with "Test status", as determined by the International Cricket Council. As of June 2017, twelve national teams have Test status, the most recently promoted being Afghanistan and Ireland on 22 June 2017.

=== Teams with Test status ===
Test status is conferred upon a country or group of countries by the ICC. There are currently twelve men's teams that have been granted this status: international teams that do not have Test status can play first-class cricket in the ICC Intercontinental Cup, under conditions which are similar to Tests.

The teams with Test status (with the date of each team's Test debut) are:

1. Australia (15 March 1877)
2. England (15 March 1877)
3. South Africa (12 March 1889)
4. West Indies (23 June 1928)
5. New Zealand (10 January 1930)
6. India (25 June 1932)
7. Pakistan (16 October 1952)
8. Sri Lanka (17 February 1982)
9. Zimbabwe (18 October 1992)
10. Bangladesh (10 November 2000)
11. Ireland (11 May 2018)
12. Afghanistan (14 June 2018)

Nine of these teams represent independent sovereign nations: the England cricket team represents the constituent countries of England and Wales, the West Indies is a combined team from fifteen Caribbean nations and territories, and Ireland represents both the Republic of Ireland and Northern Ireland.

Following the D'Oliveira affair in 1969, South Africa was suspended from all forms of cricket from 1970 until the end of the apartheid regime in 1991.

Zimbabwe's Test status was voluntarily suspended in 2006 because of very poor performances, but its Test status was reinstated in August 2011.

The ICC has made several proposals to reform the system of granting Test status, including having two tiers with promotion and relegation, or a play-off between the winners of the ICC Intercontinental Cup and the team with the lowest Test ranking. These proposals have not been successful as of 2024.

=== Statistics ===
For statistical purposes, Tests are considered to be a subset of first-class cricket. Performances in first-class matches count towards only the first-class statistical record, but performances in Test matches count towards both the Test statistics and the first-class statistics.

Statisticians have developed criteria to determine which matches count as Tests if they were played before the formal definition of Test status. There have been exceptional circumstances including the simultaneous England touring sides of 1891–92 (in Australia and South Africa) and 1929–30 (in the West Indies and New Zealand), all of whose international matches are deemed to have Test status.

In 1970, a series of five "Test matches" was played in England between England and a Rest of the World XI: these matches, originally scheduled between England and South Africa, were amended after South Africa was suspended from international cricket due to their government's apartheid policies. Although initially given Test status and included as Test matches in some record books, including Wisden Cricketers' Almanack, this was later withdrawn, and a principle was established that official Test matches can only be between nations (the geographically and demographically small countries of the West Indies have, since 1928, fielded a coalition side).

Despite this principle, in 2005, the ICC ruled that the six-day Super Series match that took place that October between Australia and a World XI was an official Test match: some cricket writers and statisticians, including Bill Frindall, have ignored the ICC's ruling and exclude this match from their records.

The series of "Test matches" played in Australia between Australia and a World XI in 1971–72, and the commercial "Supertests" organised by Kerry Packer as part of his World Series Cricket enterprise played between "WSC Australia", "WSC World XI" and "WSC West Indies" from 1977 to 1979, have never been regarded as official Test matches as of 2021.

== Conduct of the game ==
=== Playing time ===
A standard day of Test cricket consists of three sessions of two hours each, the break between sessions being 40 minutes for lunch and 20 minutes for tea. However, the times of sessions and intervals may be altered in certain circumstances: if bad weather or a change of innings occurs close to a scheduled break, the break may be taken immediately; if there has been a loss of playing time, for example because of bad weather, the session times may be adjusted to make up the lost time; if the batting side is nine wickets down at the scheduled tea break, then the interval may be delayed until either 30 minutes has elapsed or the team is all out; the final session may be extended by up to 30 minutes if 90 or more overs have not been bowled in that day's play (subject to any reduction for adverse weather); the final session may be extended by 30 minutes (except on the 5th day) if the umpires believe the result can be decided within that time.

Today, Test matches are scheduled to be played across five consecutive days. However, in the early days of Test cricket, matches were played for three or four days. England hosted Ireland at Lord's on 1 June 2023 for a four-day test. There were also frequent six-day tests until the 1970s.

Four-day Test matches were last played in 1973, between New Zealand and Pakistan. Until the 1980s, it was usual to include a 'rest day', often a Sunday. There have also been 'Timeless Tests', which have no predetermined maximum time. In 2005, Australia played a match scheduled for six days against a World XI, which the ICC sanctioned as an official Test match, though the match reached a conclusion on the fourth day. In October 2017, the ICC approved a request for a four-day Test match, between South Africa and Zimbabwe, which started on 26 December 2017 and ended on the second day, 27 December. The ICC trialled the four-day Test format until the 2019 Cricket World Cup. In December 2019, Cricket Australia were considering playing four-day Tests, subject to consensus with other Test nations. Later the same month, the ICC considered the possibility of making four-day Test matches mandatory for the ICC World Test Championship from 2023.

There have been attempts by the ICC, the sport's governing body, to introduce day-night Test matches. In 2012, the International Cricket Council passed playing conditions that allowed for the staging of day-night Test matches. The first day-night Test took place during New Zealand's tour to Australia in November 2015.

=== Play ===
Test cricket is played in innings (the word denotes both the singular and the plural). In each innings, one team bats and the other bowls (or fields). Ordinarily four innings are played in a Test match, and each team bats twice and bowls twice. Before the start of play on the first day, the two team captains and the match referee toss a coin; the captain who wins the toss decides whether his team will bat or bowl first.

In the following scenarios, the team that bats first is referred to as Team A and their opponents as Team B.

Usually the teams will alternate at the completion of each innings. Thus, Team A will bat (and Team B will bowl) until its innings ends, and then Team B will bat and Team A will bowl. When Team B's innings ends, Team A begin their second innings, and this is followed by Team B's second innings. The winning team is the one that scores more runs in their two innings.

A team's innings ends in one of the following ways:

- The team is "all out". This typically occurs when a team has lost ten wickets (ten of the eleven batters having been dismissed, so that they can no longer present a pair of batters) and are "bowled out" (regardless of how they were out). It may occasionally occur with the loss of fewer wickets if one or more batters are unavailable to bat (through injury, for example).
- The team's captain declares the innings closed, usually because they believe they have enough runs. A declaration before the innings starts is called an innings forfeiture.
- The prescribed number of overs has been bowled.
- The prescribed time for the match expires.

Although not listed in Law 13.3, the fourth innings will effectively also end when the match ends due to the team scoring the required number of runs to win.

If, at the completion of Team B's first innings, Team A leads by at least 200 runs, the captain of Team A may (but is not required to) order Team B to have their second innings next. This is called enforcing the follow-on. In this case, the usual order of the third and fourth innings is reversed: Team A will bat in the fourth innings. The purpose of this is to give Team A the opportunity to bowl Team B out for fewer runs than Team A's lead and thus win by an innings, which has been achieved in 197 out of 348 Tests (56.6%) in which the follow-on has been enforced. It is rare for a team forced to follow on to win the match; in Test cricket this has only happened four times. Australia was the losing team on three occasions, losing twice to England, in 1894 and in 1981, and once to India in 2001. Most recently, on 24 February 2023, England lost to New Zealand by one run after enforcing the follow-on.

If the whole of the first day's play of a Test match has been lost because of bad weather or other reasons like bad light, then Team A may enforce the follow-on if Team B's first innings total is 150 or more fewer than Team A's. During the 2nd Test between England and New Zealand at Headingley in 2013, England batted first after the first day was lost because of rain. New Zealand, batting second, scored 180 runs fewer than England, meaning England could have enforced the follow-on, though they chose not to. This is similar to four-day first-class cricket, where the follow-on can be enforced if the difference is 150 runs or more. If the Test is two days or fewer then the follow-on value is 100 runs.

After 80 overs, the captain of the bowling side may take a new ball, although this is not required. The captain will usually take the new ball: being harder and smoother than an old ball, a new ball generally favours faster bowlers who can make it bounce more variably. The roughened, softer surface of an old ball can be more conducive to spin bowlers, or those using reverse swing. The captain may delay the decision to take the new ball if he wishes to continue with his spinners (because the pitch favours spin). After a new ball has been taken, should an innings last a further 80 overs, then the captain will have the option to take another new ball.

A Test match will produce a result by means of one of six scenarios:

- All four innings are complete. The team batting fourth are all out before overtaking the other team, usually before matching the other team's score. The team that batted third are the winners by a margin equal to the difference in the aggregate runs scored by the two teams (for example, "Team A won by 95 runs"). Very rarely (in over 2,000 Test matches played, it has only happened twice) the scores can end level, resulting in a tie.
- The team batting in the fourth innings overtakes the opposing team's run total. The match ends, and the team batting fourth is the winner by a margin equal to the number of wickets still to fall in the innings (for example, "Team B won by five wickets").
- The third innings concludes with the team that batted twice still trailing the team that batted once. The match ends without playing a fourth innings. The team that batted only once is the winner by a margin equal to "an innings" plus the difference in aggregate run totals of the teams (for example, "Team A won by an innings and 26 runs").
- Time for the match expires without a result being reached. This usually occurs at the end of the last day of the match. The result is a draw: there is no winner, no matter how superior the position of one of the sides. Rain causing a loss of playing time is a common factor in drawn matches, although matches may be drawn even without interference from the weather: usually as a result of poor time management or an intentional effort on the part of one team to avoid losing.
- The match is abandoned because the ground is declared unfit for play. This has occurred three times, resulting each time in a draw being declared: England v Australia at Headingley, Leeds, 1975 (vandalism); West Indies v England at Sabina Park, Kingston, Jamaica, 1998 (dangerous ground); West Indies v England at Sir Vivian Richards Stadium, Antigua, 2009 (dangerous ground).
- The match is awarded through a forfeiture. If a team refuses to take the field of play, the umpires may award the match to the opposing team. This has only happened once in Test cricket, in the 2006 fourth Test between England and Pakistan.

=== Clothing and equipment ===
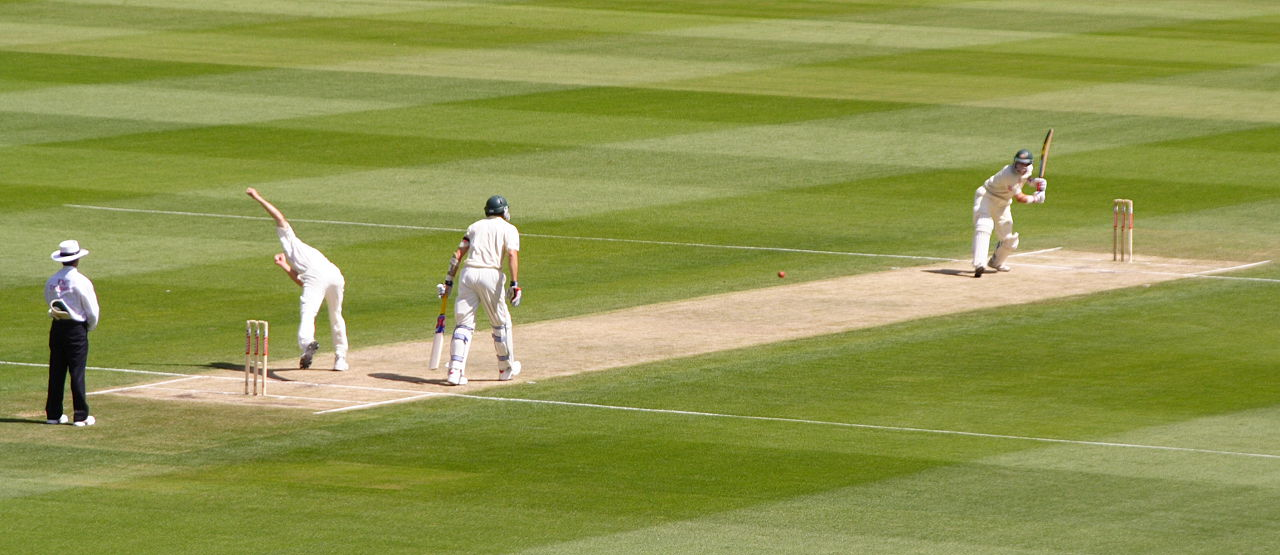
Test cricketers playing in their whites

Traditionally cricketers play in all-white kit. Unlike in limited overs cricket, this remains the case in Test cricket, as mandated by the ICC Clothing and Equipment Regulations.

== Competitions ==
=== Tours ===
Test cricket is almost always played as a series of matches between two countries, with all matches in the series taking place in the same country (the host). Often there is a perpetual trophy that is awarded to the winner, the most famous of which is the Ashes contested between England and Australia. There have been two exceptions to the bilateral nature of Test cricket: the 1912 Triangular Tournament, a three-way competition between England, Australia and South Africa (hosted by England), and the Asian Test Championship, an event held in 1998–99 and 2001–02.

The number of matches in Test series has varied from one to seven. Up until the early 1990s, Test series between international teams were organised between the two national cricket organisations with umpires provided by the home team. With the entry of more countries into Test cricket, and a wish by the ICC to maintain public interest in Tests in the face of the popularity of One Day International cricket, a rotation system was introduced that sees all ten Test teams playing each other over a six-year cycle, and an official ranking system (with a trophy held by the highest-ranked team). In this system, umpires are provided by the ICC. An elite panel of umpires was maintained since 2002, and the panel is supplemented by an additional International Panel that includes three umpires named by each Test-playing country. The elite umpires officiate almost all Test matches, though usually not Tests involving their home country.

==== Perpetual trophies ====
Several pairs of Test teams have established perpetual trophies which are competed for whenever teams play each other in Test series. The current ones are:

Name of trophy	Team 1	Team 2	First contested	Latest contested
The Ashes	Australia	England	1882–83	2025–26
Anthony de Mello Trophy^{[A]}	India	England	1951–52	2023–24
Pataudi Trophy^{[A]}	England	India	2007	2021
Anderson–Tendulkar Trophy^{[A]}	England	India	2025	2025
Frank Worrell Trophy	Australia	West Indies	1960–61	2023–24
Richards–Botham Trophy^{[B]}	England	West Indies	2021–22	2024
Trans-Tasman Trophy	Australia	New Zealand	1985–86	2023–24
Border–Gavaskar Trophy	Australia	India	1996–97	2024–25
Southern Cross Trophy	Australia	Zimbabwe	1999–2000	2003–04
Sir Vivian Richards Trophy	South Africa	West Indies	1998–99	2024
Clive Lloyd Trophy	West Indies	Zimbabwe	2001	2022–23
Basil D'Oliveira Trophy	England	South Africa	2004–05	2022
Warne–Muralitharan Trophy	Australia	Sri Lanka	2007–08	2024–25
Gandhi–Mandela Trophy	India	South Africa	2015–16	2023–24
Sobers–Tissera Trophy	Sri Lanka	West Indies	2015–16	2021–22
Ganguly–Durjoy Trophy	India	Bangladesh	2016–17	2024–25
Benaud–Qadir Trophy	Australia	Pakistan	2021–22	2023–24
Tangiwai Shield	New Zealand	South Africa	2023–24	2023–24
Crowe–Thorpe Trophy	England	New Zealand	2024–25	2024–25

^{A} The Anthony de Mello Trophy is awarded for the India–England test series played in India, whilst the Anderson–Tendulkar Trophy is awarded for the same series played in England. It replaced the Pataudi Trophy which was used until 2021.
^{B} The Richards–Botham Trophy, first played for in 2021–22, replaced the Wisden Trophy, which was discontinued after 2020.

Number of perpetual trophies contested by each team
Team	No. of Trophies contested
Australia	7
England	5
India	5
West Indies	5
South Africa	4
New Zealand	3
Sri Lanka	2
Zimbabwe	2
Bangladesh	1
Pakistan	1

=== International Test rankings ===
The twelve Test-playing nations are currently ranked as follows:

ICC Men's Test Team Rankings
Team	Matches	Points	Rating
Australia	27	3,411	126
South Africa	19	2,256	119
New Zealand	22	2,326	106
India	29	3042	105
England	36	3,658	102
Bangladesh	25	1,878	78
Sri Lanka	19	1,916	77
West Indies	27	2,008	74
Pakistan	23	1,623	71
Zimbabwe	13	217	17
Source: ICC Men's Test Team Rankings, 13 October 2026 See points calculations for more details.

Afghanistan and Ireland do not currently have a rating due to not having played the required amount of Tests (8) within the three-year cycle.

=== World Test Championship ===
After years of delays since proposals began in 2009, a league competition for Test cricket was held in 2019–2021. Arranged as a bilateral series in various countries with one team as host and another team as visitor. The length of each series varies between 2 and 5 matches. Ireland, Zimbabwe and Afghanistan are not taking part in this competition, but instead play a program of Test matches with each other and other teams during the same period.

WTC league games are organized by the host nation's cricket board, whereas the final is organized directly by the ICC. The winners of the tournament are awarded the Test Mace, which was previously held by the leader of the test team rankings.

==== Final results ====
Year	Final statistics					Individual tournament statistics					
Year	Venue	Winner	Winning margin	Runner-up	Player of the match	Most runs	Highest score	Most centuries	Most wickets	Best Bowling	Most five-wicket hauls
2021	(England) Rose Bowl, Southampton	New Zealand	8 wickets	India	Kyle Jamieson	Marnus Labuschagne, 1675	David Warner, 335*	Marnus Labuschagne, 5	Ravichandran Ashwin, 71	Lasith Embuldeniya, 7/137	Kyle Jamieson, 5
2023	(England) The Oval, London	Australia	209 runs	India	Travis Head	Joe Root, 1915	Tom Latham, 252	Joe Root, 8	Nathan Lyon, 88	Ajaz Patel, 10/119	Nathan Lyon, 5
2025	(England) Lord's, London	South Africa	5 wickets	Australia	Aiden Markram	Joe Root, 1968	Harry Brook, 317	Joe Root, 7	Pat Cummins, 80	Noman Ali, 8/46	Pat Cummins, 6
2027	(England) Lord's, London										

== Popularity ==
Supporters of Test cricket, including Adam Gilchrist, argue that it is "the ultimate test of a player's and team's ability". However, it has been suggested that Test cricket may be losing popularity, particularly in the face of competition from short form cricket. Day/night Test matches have been suggested as one way to address this problem. The suggested fall in popularity has been disputed, with a 2019 Marylebone Cricket Club poll showing that 86% of all cricket fans support Test cricket, more than any other format. In 2025, after leading Royal Challengers Bangalore to their maiden Indian Premier League title, Virat Kohli stated that “The IPL marks five levels under Test cricket,” highlighting his belief in Test cricket as the superior format in a nation where the sport holds deep cultural importance. Furthermore, Test cricket has experienced a revival of interest among fans due to several closely-fought series and the reduction in the number of draws.

== See also ==
- List of Test cricket grounds
- List of Test cricket records
- Lists of Test cricketers
- List of cricketers who have played 100 Tests
- One Day International
- Twenty20 International
