= 2025 ACC Men's Under-19 Premier Cup =

Cricket tournament

- Dates: 21 November – 1 December 2025
- Administrator: Asian Cricket Council
- Cricket format: 50 overs
- Tournament format(s): Group round-robin and knockout
- Host: United Arab Emirates
- Champions: United Arab Emirates (1st title)
- Runners-up: Nepal
- Participants: 14
- Matches: 22
- Most runs: (Singapore) Aahan Vuthandam (337)
- Most wickets: (United Arab Emirates) Ali Asgar (11)
- Official website: https://asiancricket.org/home

The 2025 ACC Men's Under-19 Premier Cup was the second edition of the ACC Men's Under-19 Premier Cup, organized by the Asian Cricket Council (ACC). Serving as the final qualifying event for the 2025 ACC Under-19 Asia Cup, the tournament provided a crucial pathway for associate nations to compete at the highest level of youth cricket in the region. It was hosted by the United Arab Emirates from 21 November to 1 December 2025.

The tournament was contested by fourteen teams divided into four groups, followed by a knockout stage with all the matches played in Ajman, across four venues: the Seven Districts Ground, the Karwan Cricket Ground, the Seven Districts Ground 2, and the Royal Cricket Ground. The winner, the runner-up, and the winner of the third-place playoff match qualified for the 2025 ACC Under-19 Asia Cup. There, they joined the five full members of the ACC: Afghanistan, Bangladesh, India, Pakistan, and Sri Lanka.

Nepal entered the tournament as the defending champions, having secured the title in the previous edition (2023). They had defeated the UAE by 19 runs under the DLS method in a rain-affected final held in Malaysia. The tournament’s knockout stage concluded its semi-finals on 29 November, with Nepal and the UAE advancing to the final, thereby securing two of the three available qualification berths for the U19 Asia Cup.

== Squads ==
| Bahrain | Hong Kong | Iran | Japan | Kuwait | Malaysia | Maldives |
|---|---|---|---|---|---|---|
| Muhammed Basil (c); Sai Sarthak (vc); Muhammad Basim; Abhinav Girish; Muhammad Hamdan; Muhammad Adil Khan; Ayan Khan; Anas Obaid; Ayan Obaid; Mohammed Rehaan; Aashish Sadashiva; Sunish Sunil; Abdullah Yousuf; Aaron Xavier | Shiv Mathur (c); Preet Mangukiya (vc); Mohammad Aftaab; Mohammad Fazeel Awan; Aarez Dar; Harry Dodgson; Abhimanyu Ganesan; Jude Li; Daniel Mapp; Veer Mathur; Seth Perera; Abdul Samad; Reyansh Sharma; Harishanker Venkatesh | Farhan Bahak (c); Abdollah Derakhshandeh; Hanzaleh Derakhshandeh; Mohammadtaha Dorri; Moez Jadgal; Reza Khjehdangolani; Armin Khorsand; Asef khorsand; Hussain Khorsand; Sam Khorsand; Yasin Raeisi; Benyamin Shahnavazi; Samaan Sheikhi | Kazuma Kato-Stafford (c); Skyler Cook; Charles Hara-Hinze; Gabriel Hara-Hinze; Montgomery Hara-Hinze; Kaisei Kobayashi-Doggett; Ryuki Ozeki; Nihar Parmar; Chihaya Sekine; Hugo Tani-Kelly; Sandev Waduge; Kai Wall; Alexander Watanabe-Dawson; Taylor Waugh | Thewan Dion (c); Ali Abbas; Ummer Abbas; Rayan Aiden; Muhammad Aqif; Asmeet Avinash; Hussain Burhanuddin; Usman Ghani; Janath Jeewanga; Het Kishor; Dhaksh Lakshman; Jay Maheshkumar; Arsh Sahil; Kandarp Tushar | Deeaz Patro (c); Muhammad Aalif Shamsul; Hariz Afnan; Che Ahmad Al Atif; Muhammad Akram; Muhammad Fathul; Mohammed Hairil Harisan; Syakir Izzudin; Jaashwin Krishnamurthi; Muhamad Nurhanif Maliki; Hamzah Bin Panggi; Asyraf Rifaie; Nagin Sathnakumaran; Azib Wajdi | Mabsar Abdulla (c); Nihal Abdulla; Yoosuf R Aflah; Shakeeb Ahamed; Hamd Hussain; Mizyan Ibrahim; Abdulla Kayan; Adam Khalaf; Mohamed Miuvaan; Ahmed Naisam Nisah; Mohammed Sabbir; Mohamed Shium; Mohamed Zuhan |
| Nepal | Oman | Qatar | Saudi Arabia | Singapore | Thailand | United Arab Emirates |
| Ashok Dhami (c); Dilsad Ali (WK); Roshan BK (WK); Nischal Chhetri; Vansh Chhetri; Anish Lohar; Dayanand Mandal; Nitesh Patel; Aprajit Poudel; Chandan Ram; Sushil Rawal; Cibrin Shrestha; Darsh Sonar; Niraj Yadav | Jeet Shah (c); Saumya Sampat (vc); Mohammad Aseel; Jeyapranesh Ayyappan; Vihaan Chauhan; Varshieth Dinesh; Mohammad Eisa; Rishab Gupta; Mohammad Hamid; Prathiesh HR; Aryan Joshi; Nitish Nadendla; Ojjus Pachisia; Kavish Shah | Anayatullah (c); Aayush; Mohammad Adel; Ahmed Ayaan; Chirag; Dhruv; Muhammad Ibrahim; Sri Induvadan Reddy; Essam Mansoor; Sawwaf Shafwan; Muhammad Shoaib; Joel Silas; Vaibhav; Avinash Vinay | Rayyan Khan (c); Hashir Ahmad; Taha Amre; Rayyan Athar; Mohammed Rayyan Kashif; Anas Khan; Majdi; Fahad Munir; Mohammad Rehan; Ali Eqan Saqib; Zuber Sunasara; Taha Vaseem; Omair Wahab | Jonty Iggo (c); Aslan Ali Xi Jafri; Kabir Berlia; Vedansh Gupta; Arush Kappala; Arnav Manoj; Neel Mittal; Vedant Nagpaul; Riaan Naik; Yuvaan Pandey; Pranav Pokala; Mason Arthur Sherry; Harsh Venkataram; Aahan Vuthandam | Natpakhan Manowon (c); Photsawat Chanhom; Phatummakan Donkaew; Suphawit Faksuea; Sathawut Kanarsawa; Worawut Panhasena; Natthanon Soisa; Paphawit Somsuk; Witthawat Srikaew; Bhurin Suamcheepmasau; Sutthimon Thongsom; Aruesanan Wichakam; Jetsada Yangsuay | Yayin Kiran Rai (c); Saleh Amin; Ali Asgar; Noorullah Ayobi; Karan Dhiman; Naseem Khan; Rayan Khan; Ahmed Khodadad; Prithvi Madhu; Madhav Manoj; Ayaan Misbah; Zainullah Rahmani; Yug Sharma; Uddish Suri |

== Group stage ==
=== Group A ===
Points table

| Pos | Team | Pld | W | L | NR | Pts | NRR | |
|---|---|---|---|---|---|---|---|---|
| 1 | Nepal | 2 | 2 | 0 | 0 | 4 | 2.000 | Advance to knockout stage |
| 2 | Hong Kong | 2 | 1 | 1 | 0 | 2 | −0.648 | |
| 3 | Saudi Arabia | 2 | 0 | 2 | 0 | 0 | −0.900 | |

Source: ACC

Fixtures

22 November 2025
09:30
Scorecard

| Hong Kong; 303/9 (50 overs) | v | Saudi Arabia; 288 (48.5 overs) |
| Jude Li Thomas 70 (73); Rayyan Athar 3/46 (8 overs) | | Zuber Sunasara 63 (87); Veer Mathur 3/69 (10 overs) |

Hong Kong won by 15 runs
Seven Districts Ground 1, Ajman
Umpires: Shailesh Devasthale (Ind) and Anand Natarajan (Sin)
Player of the match: Abdul Samad (HK)

- Saudi Arabia won the toss and elected to field.

25 November 2025
09:30
Scorecard

| Saudi Arabia; 218/9 (50 overs) | v | Nepal; 219/2 (30.4 overs) |
| Zuber Sunasara 48 (76); Ashok Dhami 2/34 (9 overs) | | Niraj Yadav 114 (90); Hashira Ahmad Sajjad 1/3 (0.4 over) |

Nepal won by 8 wickets
Karwan Cricket Ground, Ajman
Umpires: Vinod Babu (Oma) and Beidas Tareq (Kuw)
Player of the match: Niraj Yadav (Nep)

- Nepal won the toss and elected to field.

27 November 2025
09:30
Scorecard

| Hong Kong; 151 (40.5 overs) | v | Nepal; 270/7 (50 overs) |
| Shiv Mathur 30 (29); Aprajit Poudel 4/31 (10 overs) | | Ashok Dhami 73 (51); Abhimanyu Ganeshan 2/37 (9 overs) |

Nepal won by 119 runs
Seven Districts Ground 2, Ajman
Umpires: Anand Natarajan (Sin) and Viswanadan Kalidas (Mas)
Player of the match: Ashok Dhami (Nep)

- Nepal won the toss and elected to bat.

=== Group B ===
Points table

| Pos | Team | Pld | W | L | NR | Pts | NRR | |
|---|---|---|---|---|---|---|---|---|
| 1 | United Arab Emirates | 2 | 2 | 0 | 0 | 4 | 3.795 | Advance to knockout stage |
| 2 | Bahrain | 2 | 1 | 1 | 0 | 2 | −0.795 | |
| 3 | Kuwait | 2 | 0 | 2 | 0 | 0 | −2.368 | |

Source: ACC

Fixtures

21 November 2025
09:30
Scorecard

| Kuwait; 137 (42.2 overs) | v | Bahrain; 138/3 (37.5 overs) |
| Jay Maheshkumar 51 (85); Anas Obaid 4/20 (10 overs) | | Muhammed Basil 59 (58); Muhammad Aqif 2/25 (7 overs) |

Bahrain won by 7 wickets
Seven Districts Ground 1, Ajman
Umpires: Nadeem Anjum (UAE) and Tabarak Dar (HK)
Player of the match: Sai Sarthak (Bhr)

- Kuwait won the toss and elected to bat.

24 November 2025
09:30
Scorecard

| Kuwait; 155 (50 overs) | v | United Arab Emirates; 159/3 (18.2 overs) |
| Ali Abbas 37 (44); Yug Sharma 3/46 (8 overs) | | Yayin Kiran Rai 75 (34); Ali Abbas 1/14 (2 overs) |

United Arab Emirates won by 7 wickets
Karwan Cricket Ground, Ajman
Umpires: Hem Raj Bhatta (Nep) and Tabarak Dar (HK)
Player of the match: Yayin Kiran Rai (UAE)

- United Arab Emirates won the toss and elected to field.

26 November 2025
09:30
Scorecard

| United Arab Emirates; 332 (50.0 overs) | v | Bahrain; 184 (44.5 overs) |
| Ayaan Misbah 72 (89); Ayan Obaid Syed 4/53 (9 overs) | | Sai Sarthak 53 (73); Karan Dhiman 4/46 (9 overs) |

United Arab Emirates won by 148 runs
Seven Districts Ground 1, Ajman
Umpires: Tabarak Dar (HK) and Shailesh Devasthale (Ind)
Player of the match: Ayaan Misbah (UAE)

- Bahrain won the toss and elected to field

=== Group C ===
Points table

| Pos | Team | Pld | W | L | NR | Pts | NRR | |
|---|---|---|---|---|---|---|---|---|
| 1 | Oman | 3 | 3 | 0 | 0 | 6 | 3.825 | Advance to knockout stage |
| 2 | Japan | 3 | 2 | 1 | 0 | 4 | 2.872 | |
| 3 | Qatar | 3 | 1 | 2 | 0 | 2 | −0.663 | |
| 4 | Maldives | 3 | 0 | 3 | 0 | 0 | −7.031 | |

Source: ACC

Fixtures

21 November 2025
09:30
Scorecard

| Japan; 422/7 (50 overs) | v | Maldives; 56 (26.3 overs) |
| Nihar Parmar 156 (132); Ahmed Naisam Nisah 2/42 (5.5 overs) | | Mohammed Sabbir 16 (42); Hugo Tani-Kelly 2/4 (3.3 overs) |

Japan won by 366 runs
Karwan Cricket Ground, Ajman
Umpires: Vinod Babu (Oma) and Beidas Tareq (Kuw)
Player of the match: Nihar Parmar (Jpn)

- Japan won the toss and elected to bat.

21 November 2025
09:30
Scorecard

| Qatar; 122 (39.1 overs) | v | Oman; 124/5 (18.4 overs) |
| Sri Induvadan Reddy 35 (72); Saumya Sampat 3/16 (6.1 overs) | | Rishab Gupta 37 (28); Joel Silas 3/9 (2 overs) |

Oman won by 5 wickets
Seven Districts Ground 2, Ajman
Umpires: Viswanadan Kalidas (Mas) and Abulhasan Vadoodh (Ind)
Player of the match: Saumya Sampat (Oma)

- Oman won the toss and elected to field.

24 November 2025
09:30
Scorecard

| Maldives; 131 (47.1 overs) | v | Qatar; 132/2 (12.3 overs) |
| Mabsar Abdulla 49 (62); Joel Silas 5/33 (10 overs) | | Joel Silas 53* (35); Mohamed Miuvaan 1/60 (6.3 overs) |

Qatar won by 8 wickets
Seven Districts Ground 1, Ajman
Umpires: Samad Akbar (Tha) and Abulhasan Vadoodh (Ind)
Player of the match: Joel Silas (Qat)

- Qatar won the toss and elected to field.

24 November 2025
09:30
Scorecard

| Japan; 172/9 (49.5 overs) | v | Oman; 173/2 (31.3 overs) |
| Kaisei Kobayashi-Doggett 33 (46); Mohammad Eisa 2/22 (10 overs) | | Jeet Shah 78* (89); Nihar Parmar 1/9 (4.3 overs) |

Oman won by 8 wickets
Seven Districts Ground 2, Ajman
Umpires: Nadeem Anjum (UAE) and Mohammed Younis (Bhr)
Player of the match: Jeet Shah (Oma)

- Oman won the toss and elected to field.

26 November 2025
09:30
Scorecard

| Japan; 278/7 (50 overs) | v | Qatar; 95 (28.4 overs) |
| Kaisei Kobayashi-Doggett 106 (73); Sawwaf Shafwan 3/51 (10 overs) | | Sawwaf Shafwan 29 (46); Aaryan Waduge 4/13 (5.4 overs) |

Japan won by 183 runs
Karwan Cricket Ground, Ajman
Umpires: Samad Akbar (Tha) and Vinod Babu (Oma)
Player of the match: Kaisei Kobayashi-Doggett (Jpn)

- Qatar won the toss and elected to field

26 November 2025
09:30
Scorecard

| Maldives; 45 (21 overs) | v | Oman; 47/2 (4.4 overs) |
| Mohamed Miuvaan 15 (27); Mohammad Eisa 5/3 (10 overs) | | Ojjus Pachisia 17 (8); Adam Khalaf 1/6 (1 over) |

Oman won by 8 wickets
Seven Districts Ground 2, Ajman
Umpires: Abulhasan Vadoodh (Ind) and Mohammed Younis (Bhr)
Player of the match: Mohammad Eisa (Oma)

- Maldives won the toss and elected to bat.

=== Group D ===
Points table

| Pos | Team | Pld | W | L | NR | Pts | NRR | |
|---|---|---|---|---|---|---|---|---|
| 1 | Malaysia | 3 | 3 | 0 | 0 | 6 | 2.339 | Advance to knockout stage |
| 2 | Singapore | 3 | 2 | 1 | 0 | 4 | 2.917 | |
| 3 | Thailand | 3 | 1 | 2 | 0 | 2 | −1.549 | |
| 4 | Iran | 3 | 0 | 3 | 0 | 0 | −5.387 | |

Source: ACC

Fixtures

22 November 2025
09:30
Scorecard

| Malaysia; 237/9 (50 overs) | v | Singapore; 169 (42.2 overs) |
| Asyraf Rifaie 56 (65); Harsh Venkatram 3/44 (10 overs) | | Aahan Vuthandam 40 (73); Muhamad Nurhanif Maliki 5/25 (9.2 overs) |

Malaysia won by 68 runs
Karwan Cricket Ground, Ajman
Umpires: Samad Akbar (Tha) and Hem Raj Bhatta (Nep)
Player of the match: Muhamad Nurhanif Maliki (Mas)

- Malaysia won the toss and elected to bat.

22 November 2025
09:30
Scorecard

| Iran; 79 (31.1 overs) | v | Thailand; 80/3 (18.5 overs) |
| Samaan Sheikhi 19 (13); Sutthimon Thongsom 2/4 (2.1 overs) | | Jetsada Yangsuay 29 (50); Moez Jadgal 1/11 (1.5 overs) |

Thailand won by 7 wickets
Seven Districts Ground 2, Ajman
Umpires: Vipin Sukhwal (Jpn) and Mohammed Younis (Bhr)
Player of the match: Jetsada Yangsuay (Tha)

- Iran won the toss and elected to bat.

25 November 2025
09:30
Scorecard

| Thailand; 51 (28.4 overs) | v | Malaysia; 52/2 (9.2 overs) |
| Natpakhan Manowon 19 (65); Muhammad Fathul Muin 4/15 (8.4 overs) | | Che Ahmad Al Atif Che Zaman 23 (28); Sutthimon Thongsom 1/25 (5 overs) |

Malaysia won by 8 wickets
Seven Districts Ground 1, Ajman
Umpires: Shailesh Devasthale (Ind) and Anand Natarajan (Sin)
Player of the match: Muhammad Fathul Muin (Mas)

- Thailand won the toss and elected to bat.

25 November 2025
09:30
Scorecard

| Singapore; 444/6 (50.0 overs) | v | Iran; 82 (39.1 overs) |
| Aahan Vuthandam 188 (121); Samaan Sheikhi 2/67 (10 overs) | | Abdollah Derakhshandeh 16 (56); Yuvaan Pandey 2/9 (8 overs) |

Singapore won by 364 runs
Seven Districts Ground 2, Ajman
Umpires: Viswanadan Kalidas (Mas) and Vipin Sukhwal (Jpn)
Player of the match: Aahan Vuthandam (Sin)

- Singapore won the toss and elected to bat.

27 November 2025
09:30
Scorecard

| Singapore; 354/5 (50.0 overs) | v | Thailand; 61 (18.5 overs) |
| Aahan Vuthandam 109 (98); Paphawit Somsuk 2/64 (8 overs) | | Natpakhan Manowon 38 (41); Harsh Venkatram 3/8 (4 overs) |

Singapore won by 292 runs
Seven Districts Ground 1, Ajman
Umpires: Tareq Beidas (Kuw) and Hem Raj Bhatta (Nep)
Player of the match: Aahan Vuthandam (Sin)

- Singapore won the toss and elected to bat.

27 November 2025
09:30
Scorecard

| Iran; 56 (30.2 overs) | v | Malaysia; 57/2 (11.5 overs) |
| Farhan Bahak 15 (51); Muhammad Fathul Muin 3/9 (7 overs) | | Mohammad Hariz Afnan 30 (32); Sam Khorsand 2/18 (5 overs) |

Malaysia won by 8 wickets
Royal Ground, Ajman
Umpires: Shailesh Devasthale (Ind) and Vipin Sukhwal (Jpn)
Player of the match: Mohammad Hariz Afnan (Mas)

- Iran won the toss and elected to bat.

== Knockout stage ==
=== Bracket ===
Semi-finals
B1 | United Arab Emirates | 131/2 (20.1)
C1 | Oman | 126 (37.3)
A1 | Nepal | 55/1 (7.5)
D1 | Malaysia | 51 (17.2)

Final
SF1W | United Arab Emirates | 147 (45.5)
SF2W | Nepal | 120 (33.2)
3rd place play-off
SF1L | Oman | 138 (48.1)
SFL2 | Malaysia | 212 (49.0)

=== Semi-finals ===
Semi-final 1
29 November 2025
09:00
Scorecard

| Oman; 126 (37.3 overs) | v | United Arab Emirates; 131/2 (20.1 overs) |
| Rishab Shivadasgupta 31 (33); Ali Asgar Shums 4/15 (10 overs) | | Yayin Rai 71 (42); Prathiesh Hema Ramesh 2/31 (7.1 overs) |

United Arab Emirates won by 8 wickets
Karwan Cricket Ground, Ajman
Umpires: Hem Raj Bhatta (Nep) and Anand Natarajan (Sin)
Player of the match: Ali Asgar Shums (UAE)

- United Arab Emirates won the toss and elected to field.

Semi-final 2
29 November 2025
09:00
Scorecard

| Malaysia; 51 (17.2 overs) | v | Nepal; 55/1 (7.5 overs) |
| Hamzah Panggi 13 (20); Nitesh Kumar Patel 4/24 (8 overs) | | Vansh Chhetri 23* (27); Muhammad Akram 1/13 (3 overs) |

Nepal won by 9 wickets
Seven Districts Ground 2, Ajman
Umpires: Nadeem Anjum (UAE) and Vipin Sukhwal (Jpn)
Player of the match: Nitesh Kumar Patel (Nep)

- Nepal won the toss and elected to field.

=== 3rd/4th place play-off ===
1 December 2025
09:00
Scorecard

| Malaysia; 212 (49 overs) | v | Oman; 138 (48.1 overs) |
| Deeaz Patro 78 (134); Mohammad Aseel 3/26 (8 overs) | | Ojjus Pachisia 28 (30); Muhamad Nurhanif 3/30 (10 overs) |

Malaysia won by 74 runs
Seven Districts Ground 2, Ajman
Umpires: Tareq Beidas (Kuw) and Hem Raj Bhatta (Nep)
Player of the match: Deeaz Patro (Mas)

- Oman won the toss and elected to field.

=== Final ===
1 December 2025
09:00
Scorecard

| United Arab Emirates; 147 (45.5 overs) | v | Nepal; 120 (33.2 overs) |
| Ashok Dhami 34 (66); Ali Asgar Shums 3/18 (10 overs) | | Ahmed Khudadad 71 (126); Dayanand Mandal 6/17 (6.5 overs) |

United Arab Emirates won by 27 runs
Karwan Cricket Ground, Ajman
Umpires: Viswanadan Kalidas (Mas) and Anand Natarajan (Sin)
Player of the match: Ahmed Khudadad (UAE)

- Nepal won the toss and elected to field.
