= Under-19 Men's Asia Cup =

Cricket tournament

- Administrator: Asian Cricket Council
- Format: 50-overs
- First edition: 1989 Bangladesh
- Latest edition: 2026 Oman
- Next edition: TBD
- Tournament format: Round-robin
- Number of teams: 8
- Current champion: India (9th title)
- Most successful: India (9 titles)
- Website: asiancricket.org

The Under-19 Men's Asia Cup is a cricket competition, contested by the men's under-19 national cricket teams of the Asian Cricket Council members.

It was first held in 1989 in Bangladesh where India won the tournament. The second edition was played after 14 years in 2003 in Pakistan where India retained their title. In the group stages of 2003 edition, Irfan Pathan claimed 9/16 against Bangladesh. The third edition was played in Malaysia in 2012 where the trophy was shared by India and Pakistan after the final was tied. The fourth edition was held in 2013/14 in UAE which was won by India. The fifth edition was held in Sri Lanka in December 2016 and was won by India too. The sixth edition was held in November 2017 in Malaysia, which was won by Afghanistan. The seventh edition was held in September & October 2018 in Bangladesh, which was won by India. The eighth edition was held in September 2019 in Sri Lanka and India retained their title. The ninth edition had taken place in December 2021 in United Arab Emirates and was won by India. The 10th and 11th editions were won by Bangladesh which defeated the hosts UAE in the UAE and beat India in Nepal, in 2023 and 2024, respectively.

The second tier event, called Youth Asia Cup, was held in Hong Kong in 1997 and every second year since then. It was renamed as ACC Under-19 Elite Cup in 2007. Nepal has been the most successful team in the Elite Cup, having won the tournament four times. The third tier of the tournament is called ACC Under-19 Challenge Cup and was first held in 2008 in Thailand.

== Under-19 World Cup qualification history ==
=== ACC Under-19 Elite Cup ===
One of the major roles of the ACC Under-19 Elite Cup has been to provide member nations of the ACC with the chance to qualify for the Under-19 World Cup. It was originally known as the Youth Asia Cup and, for the first two tournaments, two teams qualified directly. During these years, teams from the EAP region took part as did Bangladesh who did not receive full member status until 2000.

After Bangladesh and the EAP sides left the competition the number of qualifying teams was reduced to one and remained this way until the 2007 competition. Following this tournament, the ACC decided to split the teams into two divisions after the model of the men's ACC Trophy. The top division, the Elite Cup, continues to be held in two-year intervals from the initial tournament. The lower division, the Challenge Cup, generally takes place in the year between Elite tournaments although the most recent edition took place in 2013 in Thailand. The winners of this tournament were Singapore.

== Editions and results ==
Year	Host Nation(s)	Final			
Year	Host Nation(s)	Venue	Winner	Result	Runners-up
1989	Bangladesh	Bangabandhu National Stadium	India; 224/7 (49 overs)	India won by 79 runs Scorecard	Sri Lanka; 145/10 (39.5 overs)
2003	Pakistan	Gaddafi Stadium	India; 229/2 (44.4 overs)	India won by 8 wickets Scorecard	Sri Lanka; 225/10 (49.4 overs)
2012	Malaysia	Kinrara Academy Oval	India / Pakistan; 282/9 (50 overs) / 282/8 (50 overs); Match tied and the trophy was shared Scorecard		
2013/14	United Arab Emirates	Sharjah Cricket Stadium	India; 314/8 (50 overs)	India won by 40 runs Scorecard	Pakistan; 274/9 (50 overs)
2016	Sri Lanka	R. Premadasa Stadium	India; 273/8 (50 overs)	India won by 34 runs Scorecard	Sri Lanka; 239/10 (48.4 overs)
2017	Malaysia	Kinrara Academy Oval	Afghanistan; 248/7 (50 overs)	Afghanistan won by 185 runs Scorecard	Pakistan; 63/10 (22.1 overs)
2018	Bangladesh	Sher-e-Bangla National Cricket Stadium	India; 304/3 (50 overs)	India won by 144 runs Scorecard	Sri Lanka; 160 (38.4 overs)
2019	Sri Lanka	R. Premadasa Stadium	India; 106 (32.4 overs)	India won by 5 runs Scorecard	Bangladesh; 101 (33 overs)
2021	United Arab Emirates	Dubai International Cricket Stadium	India; 104/1 (21.3 overs)	India won by 9 wickets (D/L); Scorecard	Sri Lanka; 106/9 (38 overs)
2023	United Arab Emirates	Dubai International Cricket Stadium	Bangladesh; 282/8 (50 overs)	Bangladesh won by 195 runs Scoreboard	United Arab Emirates; 87 (24.5 overs)
2024	United Arab Emirates	Dubai International Cricket Stadium	Bangladesh; 198 (49.1 overs)	Bangladesh won by 59 runs Scorecard	India; 139 (35.2 overs)
2025	United Arab Emirates	ICC Academy Ground	Pakistan; 347/8 (50 overs)	Pakistan won by 191 runs Scorecard	India; 156 (26.2 overs)
2026	Oman	Oman Cricket Academy Ground	India; 339/9 (50 overs)	India won by 1 wicket Scorecard	Pakistan; 337/9 (50 overs)

== Tournament summary ==
The table below provides an overview of the performances of teams over past ACC Under-19 Asia Cup tournaments.

Team	Appearances			Champion	Runners-up
Team	Total	First	Latest	Champion	Runners-up
India	12	1989	2026	9 (1989, 2003, 2012, 2013–14, 2016, 2018, 2019, 2021, 2026)	2 (2024, 2025)
Pakistan	12	1989	2026	2 (2012, 2025)	3 (2013–14, 2017, 2026)
Bangladesh	10	1989	2026	2 (2023, 2024)	1 (2019)
Afghanistan	10	2012	2026	1 (2017)	
Sri Lanka	12	1989	2026		5 (1989, 2003, 2016, 2018, 2021)
United Arab Emirates	8	2013–14	2026		1 (2023)
Nepal	10	2012	2026		
Malaysia	5	2012	2026		
Japan	2	2023	2024		
Kuwait	2	2019	2021		
Qatar	1	2012	2012		
Singapore	1	2016	2016		
Hong Kong	1	2018	2018		

== Other Formats ==
=== ACC Under-19 Premier League ===
Year	Host Nation(s)	Result		
Year	Host Nation(s)	Winner	Margin	Runners-up
2014	Kuwait	Afghanistan; 10 points	Afghanistan won on points Table	Nepal; 8 points
2015	Malaysia	Afghanistan; 10 points	Afghanistan won on points Table	Nepal; 8 points

=== ACC Under-19 Elite Cup ===
Year	Tournament Name	Host Nation(s)	Final Venue	Final		
Year	Tournament Name	Host Nation(s)	Final Venue	Winner	Result	Runners-up
1997	Youth Asia Cup	Hong Kong	Kowloon Cricket Club	Bangladesh; 347 all out	Bangladesh won by 256 runs	Papua New Guinea; 91 all out
1999	Youth Asia Cup	Singapore	Kalang Ground	Bangladesh; 126/4 (29.1 overs)	Bangladesh won by 6 wickets Report	Nepal; 125 all out (39.2 overs)
2001	Youth Asia Cup	Nepal	Tribhuvan University	Nepal; 140/3	Nepal won by 7 wickets	Malaysia; 139 all out
2003	Youth Asia Cup	Pakistan	National Stadium, Karachi	Nepal; 155/5 (25 overs)	Nepal won by 30 runs (DLS method); Scorecard	Malaysia; 125/6 (25 overs)
2005	ACC Under-19 Cup	Nepal	Tribhuvan	Nepal; 87/3 (25.3 overs)	Nepal won by 7 wickets Scorecard	Malaysia; 83/10 (25.5 overs)
2007	ACC Under-19 Elite Cup	Malaysia	Kinrara Oval	Nepal; 172/10 (49.4 overs)	Nepal won by 48 runs Scorecard	Afghanistan; 124/10 (45.5 overs)
2009	ACC Under-19 Elite Cup	Kuwait	Hubara	Hong Kong; 216/2 (47 overs)	Hong Kong won by 8 wickets Scorecard	Afghanistan; 215/9 (50 overs)
2011	ACC Under-19 Elite Cup	Thailand	Prem Oval	Afghanistan; 200/9 (50 overs)	Afghanistan won by 61 runs Tournament Details	Nepal; 139 all out (43.1 overs)
2013	ACC Under-19 Elite Cup	Malaysia	Kinrara Oval	Afghanistan; 58/0 (11.1 overs)	Afghanistan won by 10 wickets Scorecard	United Arab Emirates; 57 (27.2 overs)
2017	ICC Asia Under-19s World Cup Qualifier	Singapore	N/A	Afghanistan; 12 points	League standings League	Nepal; 8 points
2019	ICC Asia Under-19s World Cup Qualifier	Malaysia	N/A	United Arab Emirates; 10 points	League standings League	Nepal; 8 points

=== ICC U19 Cricket World Cup Asia Qualifier Division 2 ===
Year	Host Nation(s)	Final Venue	Final		
Year	Host Nation(s)	Final Venue	Winner	Result	Runner-up
2016	Malaysia	Kinrara Oval	Malaysia	Malaysia won by 6 wickets Scorecard	Singapore

=== ACC Under-19 Challenge Cup ===
Year	Host Nation(s)	Final Venue	Final		
Year	Host Nation(s)	Final Venue	Winner	Result	Runner-up
2008	Thailand	Prem Oval	Saudi Arabia; 247/10 (49.4 overs)	Saudi Arabia won by 59 runs	Bhutan; 188/10 (45.1 overs)
2009	Thailand	Prem Oval	Bahrain; 104/5 (33 overs)	Bahrain won by 5 wickets	Thailand; 100/10 (36.1 overs)
2011	Malaysia	Kinrara Oval	Saudi Arabia; 129/6 (42.3 overs)	Saudi Arabia won by 4 wickets	Kuwait; 125/10 (35.3 overs)
2013	Thailand	Terdthai Cricket Ground	Singapore; 169 (49.1 overs)	Singapore won by 16 runs	Oman; 153 (45.2 overs)

=== ACC Men's Under-19 Premier Cup ===
Year	Host Nation(s)	Final Venue	Final		
Year	Host Nation(s)	Final Venue	Winner	Result	Runner-up
2023	Malaysia	Bayuemas Oval	Nepal; 280/8 (50 overs)	Nepal won by 19 runs (DLS method); Scorecard	United Arab Emirates; 178 (26.5 overs)
2025	United Arab Emirates	Karwan Cricket Ground, Ajman	United Arab Emirates; 147 (45.5 overs)	United Arab Emirates won by 27 runs Scorecard	Nepal; 120 (33.2 overs)
2027	(N/A)				

== Records ==
Only records for topflight ACC under-19 competitions are included. Scorecards for some matches at the 1999 Youth Asia Cup are unavailable.
Highest team scores

- 421/7 (50 overs) – Afghanistan v. Thailand, 6 May 2013, at Kinrara Academy Oval, Kuala Lumpur.
- 391/4 (50 overs) – Nepal v. Maldives, 14 July 2003, at National Stadium, Pakistan.
- 391/4 (50 overs) – Nepal v. Oman, 2 February 2011, at Terdthai Cricket Ground, Bangkok.
- 389/7 (50 overs) – Afghanistan v. United Arab Emirates, 10 November 2014, at Sulabiya Ground, Kuwait City.
- 383/4 (50 overs) – Bahrain v. Brunei, 13 November 2005, at Pulchowk Engineering Campus Ground, Lalitpur.

Lowest team scores

- 21 (15.2 overs) – Brunei v. Nepal Nepal, 9 November 2005, at Army School Ground, Bhaktapur.
- 26 (21.4 overs) – Thailand v. Afghanistan, 6 May 2013, at Kinrara Academy Oval, Kuala Lumpur.
- 34 (19.2 overs) – Brunei v. Bahrain, 13 November 2005, at Pulchowk Engineering Campus Ground, Lalitpur.
- 39 (14.5 overs) – Iran v. United Arab Emirates, 9 November 2005, at Tudikhel Ground, Kathmandu.
- 39 (25.1 overs) – Saudi Arabia v. Malaysia, 14 November 2014, at Sulabiya Ground, Kuwait City.
- 39 (27.2 overs) – Oman v. United Arab Emirates, 5 February 2011, at Terdthai Cricket Ground, Bangkok.

Highest individual scores

- 200* (140 balls) –Bahrain Gayan de Silva, v. Brunei, 13 November 2005, at Pulchok Engineering Campus Ground, Lalitpur.
- 168* (140 balls) – Oman Adnan Ilyas, v. Hong Kong, 15 July 2003, at National Stadium, Karachi.
- 165 (? balls) – Singapore Philip Parker, v. Fiji, 30 November 1997, at Diocesan Boys' School, Hong Kong.
- 160* (119 balls) – Afghanistan Tariq Stanikzai, v. United Arab Emirates, 10 November 2014, at Sulabiya Ground, Kuwait City.
- 158 (? balls) – Singapore Philip Parker, v. Papua New Guinea, 30 November 1997, at Tin Kwong Road, Hong Kong.

Best bowling figures

- 8/12 (10 overs) – Afghanistan Aftab Alam, v. Oman, 3 February 2011, at Gymkhana Club Ground, Chiang Mai.
- 8/14 (10 overs) – Hong Kong Mohammad Ghazanfar, v. Thailand, 3 May 2013, at Kelab Aman, Kuala Lumpur.
- 8/15 (6.5 overs) – Nepal Rahul Vishvakarma, v. Thailand, 5 February 2011, at AIT Ground, Bangkok.
- 8/15 (9.2 overs) – Bahrain Salman Sattar, v. Brunei, 13 November 2005, at Pulchowk Engineering Campus Ground, Lalitpur.
- 8/24 (8 overs) – Nepal Avinash Karn, v. Bahrain, 6 May 2013, at Bayuemas Oval, Kuala Lumpur.

Highest margin of defeat by Runs

- 395 –v. Thailand v Afghanistan, 6 May 2013, at Kinrara Academy Oval, Kuala Lumpur

Highest margin of defeat by wickets

- 10 wickets – Afghanistan v. United Arab Emirates, final of 2013

== See also ==
- ACC Trophy
