= Bangladesh national under-19 cricket team =

Men's U-19 Cricket Team representing Bangladesh

Bangladesh
- Association: Bangladesh Cricket Board

Personnel
- Captain: Azizul Hakim Tamim
- Coach: Naveed Nawaz
- Manager: Sajal Ahmed Chowdhury

Team information
- Colors: Green and Red
- Founded: 1997
- Home ground: Shaheed Kamruzzaman Stadium, Rajshahi
- Capacity: 25,400

History
- First-class debut: v. England at Headingley, Leeds; 28–31 July 2004
- List A debut: v. Namibia at Laudium Oval, Pretoria; 12 January 1998
- Twenty20 debut: v. England at Sheikh Kamal International Cricket Stadium, Cox's Bazar; 27 January 2019
- ICC Under-19 World Cup wins: (gold) (2020)
- ACC Under-19 Asia Cup wins: (gold) (2023, 2024)

International Cricket Council
- ICC status: Full member (2000); Affiliate member (1997)
- ICC region: Asia
Test kit
ODI kit
T20I kit
- As of 18 June 2026

The Bangladesh Under-19 cricket team represents Bangladesh in cricket at Under-19 level. Known as the Young Tigers, the team has been playing youth official Test matches since 2004, and has won the ACC Under-19 Cup in 2023, winning against the United Arab Emirates national under-19 cricket team by 195 runs in the final match. It has won one Under-19 World Cup in 2020.

== Current squad ==
The current squad is announced 26 June 2023 by BCB.

As of 5 July 2023

No	Player	Playing role	Date of birth
1	Mahfijul Islam	Batter	10 March 2004
2	Md Prantik Nawrose Nabil	Batter	13 November 2003
3	Aich Mollah	Batter	8 May 2003
4	Ariful Islam	Batter	8 December 2004
5	Md Fahim	Wicketkeeper; Batter	10 February 2004
6	Ashiqur Rahman Shibli	Wicketkeeper; Batter	1 December 2005
7	Mohammad Rizwan Chowdhury	Batter	3 May 2005
8	Adil Bin Siddique	Wicketkeeper; Batter	1 July 2004
9	Ahrar Amin (Captain)	Batting Allrounder	21 October 2004
10	Shihab James	Batter	9 September 2005
11	Naeem Ahmed	Batter	10 May 1998
12	Parvez Hossain Jibon	Bowler	8 October 2004
13	Wasi Siddique	Allrounder	6 November 2006
14	Mahfuzur Rahman Rabby	Bowling Allrounder	8 May 2005
15	Rafi Uzzaman	Bowler	24 December 2006
16	Tanvir Ahamed	Bowler	17 October 2005
17	Rohanat Doullah Borson	Bowler	22 May 2005
18	Iqbal Hossain Emon	Bowler	5 December 2006
19	Maruf Mridha	Bowler	15 May 2006

== Records & statistics ==
International match summary-Bangladesh

As of 31 January 2026

Playing records
Format	M	W	L	T	D/NR	Inaugural match
Youth Tests	25	4	7	0	14	28 July 2004
Youth One-Day Internationals	334	200	117	2	17	12 January 1998
Youth Twenty20 Internationals	6	3	3	0	0	27 January 2019

=== Youth Test statistics ===
Youth Test record versus other nations. Record complete to Youth Tests #292. Last updated 3 May 2023.

Opponent	M	W	L	T	D/NR	First match	First win
Afghanistan	1	0	1	0	0	22 September 2021	
England	8	3	3	0	2	28 July 2004	16 October 2009
Pakistan	3	0	1	0	2	20 November 2007	
South Africa	1	0	0	0	1	27 December 2007	
Sri Lanka	12	1	2	0	9	7 July 2007	16 October 2018

=== Youth ODI statistics ===
Youth ODI record versus other nations. Records complete to YODI #1663. Last updated 31 January 2026.

ICC Full members
Opponent	M	W	L	T	NR	First match	First win
Afghanistan	23	12	9	0	2	15 February 2014	15 February 2014
Australia	6	3	2	0	1	4 March 2004	4 March 2004
England	48	27	17	1	3	15 January 1998	15 January 1998
India	30	7	22	0	1	12 January 2000	24 January 2002
Ireland	6	6	0	0	0	22 January 1998	22 January 1998
New Zealand	11	7	3	0	1	13 January 1998	5 February 2006
Pakistan	30	13	15	0	2	31 October 2003	31 October 2003
South Africa	36	23	13	0	0	27 January 2000	25 November 2005
Sri Lanka	64	32	27	0	5	2 November 2003	4 December 2005
West Indies	18	12	6	0	0	24 January 1998	24 January 1998
Zimbabwe	18	17	1	0	0	23 January 2000	23 January 2000
Associate members
Opponent	M	W	L	T	NR	First match	First win
Bermuda	1	1	0	0	0	18 February 2008	18 February 2008
Canada	5	4	0	1	0	22 January 2002	23 February 2004
Hong Kong	2	2	0	0	0	2 October 2018	2 October 2018
Kuwait	1	1	0	0	0	25 December 2021	25 December 2021
Kenya	3	3	0	0	0	19 January 1998	19 January 1998
Namibia	6	6	0	0	0	12 January 1998	12 January 1998
Japan	1	1	0	0	0	11 December 2023	11 December 2023
Nepal	6	5	1	0	0	6 February 2002	6 February 2016
Netherlands	1	1	0	0	0	16 January 2000	16 January 2000
Papua New Guinea	4	4	0	0	0	20 January 1998	20 January 1998
Qatar	1	1	0	0	0	23 June 2012	23 June 2012
Singapore	1	1	0	0	0	16 December 2016	16 December 2016
Scotland	4	4	0	0	0	17 February 2004	17 February 2004
United Arab Emirates	7	6	0	0	1	22 January 2022	22 January 2022
Uganda	2	2	0	0	0	25 February 2004	25 February 2004
United States	2	2	0	0	0	26 January 2024	26 January 2024

=== Youth T20 statistics ===
Youth T20I record versus other nations. Records complete to YT20I #16. Last updated 17 May 2023.

Opponent	M	W	L	T	/NR	First match	First win
England	3	2	1	0	0	27 January 2019	27 January 2019
Pakistan	3	1	2	0	0	16 November 2022	16 November 2022

== Coaching staff ==
Position	Name
Team Manager	Sajal Ahmed Chowdhury
Head coach	Naveed Nawaz
Batting Coach	Mohammad Salahuddin
Bowling Coach	Nazmul Hossain
Fielding Coach	Sohel Islam
Physical Performance Coach	Richard Stonier
Team physio	Muzadded Alpha Sany

== Tournament history ==
A red box around the year indicates tournaments played within Bangladesh

Key
Champions
Runners-up
Semi-finals

=== ICC U-19 Cricket World Cup ===
Bangladesh U19 Cricket World Cup records
Host/Year	Result	Pos	№	Pld	W	L	T	NR
(Australia) 1988	Part of ICC Associates XI							
(South Africa) 1998	Group stage	9th	16	7	6	1	0	0
(Sri Lanka) 2000	Group stage	10th	16	8	5	2	0	1
(New Zealand) 2002	Group stage	11th	16	7	3	3	1	0
(Bangladesh) 2004	Group stage	9th	16	8	6	2	0	0
(Sri Lanka) 2006	Quarter final	5th	16	6	5	1	0	0
(Malaysia) 2008	Quarter final	7th	16	5	3	1	0	0
(New Zealand) 2010	Group stage	9th	16	6	4	2	0	0
(Australia) 2012	Quarter final	7th	16	6	3	3	0	0
(United Arab Emirates) 2014	Group stage	9th	16	6	5	1	0	0
(Bangladesh) 2016	Semi final	3rd	16	6	5	1	0	0
(New Zealand) 2018	Quarter final	6th	16	6	3	3	0	0
(South Africa) 2020	Champions	1st	16	6	5	0	0	1
(Cricket West Indies) 2022	Quarter final	8th	16	6	2	4	0	0
(South Africa) 2024	Super 6	6th	16	5	3	2	0	0
(Zimbabwe) (Namibia) 2026	Super 6	8th	16	5	2	2	0	1
Total	1 Title			92	60	28	1	3

=== ACC Under-19 Cup ===
Bangladesh U19 Asia Cup records
Host/Year	Result	Pos	№	Pld	W	L	T	NR
(Bangladesh) 1989	Did not participate							
(Pakistan) 2003	Group stage	4th	4	3	0	3	0	0
(Malaysia) 2012	Group stage	5th	8	3	1	2	0	0
(United Arab Emirates) 2014	Group stage	5th	8	3	1	2	0	0
(Sri Lanka) 2016	Semi final	3rd	8	4	3	1	0	0
(Malaysia) 2017	Semi final	3rd	8	4	3	1	0	0
(Bangladesh) 2018	Semi final	3rd	8	4	2	2	0	0
(Sri Lanka) 2019	Runner up	2nd	8	5	3	1	0	1
(United Arab Emirates) 2021	Semi final	3rd	8	4	2	1	0	1
(United Arab Emirates) 2023	Champions	1st	8	5	5	0	0	0
(United Arab Emirates) 2024	Champions	1st	8	5	4	1	0	0
(United Arab Emirates) 2025	Semi final	3rd	8	4	3	1	0	0
Total	2 Titles			44	27	15	0	2

== Honours ==
=== ICC ===
- U19 World Cup:
  - Champions (1): 2020

=== ACC ===
- U19 Asia Cup:
  - Champions (2): 2023, 2024
  - Runners-up (1): 2019

== Records in Under-19 World Cup ==
=== Most career matches ===
As of 10 July 2023

S/N	Players	Matches	Career Span
1	Aftab Ahmed; Ashiqur Rahman; Nafees Iqbal	15	2002–2004
2	Hannan Sarkar	14	1998–2002
3	Ashik Chowdhury	12	2010–2012

=== Most career runs ===
As of 10 July 2023

S/N	Players	Runs	Career Span	Ref
1	Ashik Chowdhury	519	2010–2012	
2	Litton Das	462	2012–2014	
3	Shadman Islam	406	2014–2014	

=== Highest individual runs ===
As of 10 July 2023

S/N	Players	Highest	Against
1	Anamul Haque	128	Pakistan
2	Shadman Islam	126	Afghanistan
3	Towhid Hridoy	122	Canada

=== Most career wickets ===
As of 10 July 2023

S/N	Players	Wickets	Average
1	Enamul Haque Jr	22	10.18
2	Mehedi Hasan Miraz	19	21.36
3	Rakibul Hasan	16	20.30

=== Best bowling figures ===
As of 10 July 2023

S/N	Players	Best bowling	Against
1	Hannan Sarkar	5/15 (10 Overs)	Namibia (19 January 2000)
2	Rakibul Hasan	5/19 (9.3 Overs)	South Africa (20 January 1998)
3	Tanvirul Islam	5/29 (9.5 Overs)	Papua New Guinea

=== Lowest team totals ===
As of 25 January 2023

S/N	Totals	Against	Dates
1	41/10, (11.4 Overs)	South Africa	24 February 2008
2	91/10, (42.5 Overs)	Zimbabwe	11 January 2002
3	97/10, (35.2 Overs)	England	16 January 2002

== 2020 Under-19 Cricket World Cup ==
In the 2020 World Cup, Bangladesh were group champion with 2 wins and a no result where they were placed along with Pakistan, Zimbabwe and Scotland. In the Super league Quarter final, they defeated the host South Africa by 104 runs and defeated New Zealand by 6 wickets in the Semi-final to reach the final for the first ever time.

=== Final ===
In the final, India, batting first gathered 177 runs before being all out. In reply, Bangladesh made a flying start as they scored 55 runs losing only a wicket in first 10 overs. Soon Indian leggie Ravi Bishnoi picked up 4 quick wickets as Bangladesh were 102 for 6 from 62/2 at the end of 25 overs. When Bangladesh were 163/7 at the end of 41 overs and the still needing 15 runs to win, rain arrives and the match was reduced to 46 overs with a revised target as per DLS method was 7 runs needing from 30 balls. From thereon, Bangladesh did not take any unnecessary risks and scored the winning run with 23 balls to spare and win their first ever ICC title by 3 wickets.

9 February 2020
10:00
Scorecard

India; 177 (47.2 overs)	v	Bangladesh; 170/7 (42.1 overs)
Yashasvi Jaiswal 88 (121); Avishek Das 3/40 (9 overs)		Parvez Hossain Emon 47 (79); Ravi Bishnoi 4/30 (10 overs)

Bangladesh won by 3 wickets (DLS method)
JB Marks Oval, Potchefstroom
Umpires: Adrian Holdstock (SA) and Sam Nogajski (Aus)
Player of the match: Akbar Ali (Ban)

- Bangladesh won the toss and elected to field.
- Bangladesh were set a revised target of 170 runs from 46 overs due to rain.
- This was Bangladesh's first World Cup U-19 Win, and overall the first World Cup win for Bangladesh in any format.

Team of the final

Akbar Ali (c & wk), Towhid Hridoy (vc), Parvez Hossain Emon, Mahmudul Hasan Joy, Tanzid Hasan, Avishek Das, Shahadat Hossain, Shamim Hossain, Tanzim Hasan Sakib, Shoriful Islam, Rakibul Hasan.

== See also ==
- Bangladesh cricket team
- Bangladesh women's cricket team
- Bangladesh A cricket team
- Bangladesh High Performance XI
- Bangladesh under-23 cricket team
- Bangladesh women's under-19 cricket team
