= Saudi Arabia national under-19 cricket team =

Saudi Arabia Under-19 cricket team

Personnel
- Owner: Saudi Arabian Cricket Federation

Team information
- Capacity: Muhammad Ahmad Raza

History
- List A debut: v. Nepal at Tack-Tek Ground Kuwait City, Kuwait; 22 April 2009

The Saudi Arabia national under-19 cricket team represents Saudi Arabia in under-19 international cricket. The team is controlled by Saudi Arabian Cricket Federation (SACF).

== Current squad ==
The following squad was named for the 2023 ACC Men's Under-19 Premier Cup.

As of 11 November 2024

Name	Date of birth	Playing role
Khaja Farhaan Uddin Syed	5 March 2006	Batter
Muhammad Ahmad Raza	15 September 2004	All Rounder
Mohamed Aqeel Ramzan	10 April 2006	Wicketkeeper/Batter
Syed Usman Siddiq	16 September 2006	Bowler
Adan	14 March 2004	Bowler
Nabeel Mohammed Akram	14 August 2004	All Rounder
Sashwath Vijaya Prasad	26 September 2005	All Rounder
Varun Saravanan Mudaliar	26 July 2005	Bowler
Zuhair Muhammad	19 March 2005	All Rounder
Mohammad Zuber Sunasara	14 March 2007	Bowler
	7 September 2005	All Rounder

== Records & statistics ==
International match summary

As of 10 November 2024

Playing records
Format	M	W	L	T	D/NR	Inaugural match
Youth One day Internationals	37	14	23	0	0	22 August 2007

As of 10 November 2024

Records against other national sides
ICC Full members
Opponent	M	W	L	T	NR	First match	First win
Afghanistan	3	0	3	0	0	3 May 2013	
Associate members
Opponent	M	W	L	T	NR	First match	First win
Bahrain	2	1	1	0	0	28 September 2016	28 September 2016
Bhutan	4	4	0	0	0	30 April 2009	30 April 2009
Brunei	1	1	0	0	0	6 July 2011	6 July 2011
Hong Kong	2	2	0	0	0	24 April 2009	24 April 2009
Kuwait	6	2	4	0	0	9 July 2011	9 July 2011
Malaysia	4	0	4	0	0	25 April 2009	
Maldives	1	1	0	0	0	4 July 2011	4 July 2011
Nepal	3	0	3	0	0	22 April 2009	
Oman	2	0	2	0	0	2018	TBD
Qatar	2	1	1	0	0	2 October 2016	2 October 2016
Singapore	2	0	2	0	0	27 April 2009	
Thailand	2	2	0	0	0	4 May 2013	4 May 2013
United Arab Emirates	3	0	3	0	0	8 May 2013	

== ICC U19 Cricket World Cup ==
Saudi Arabia's U19 World Cup Record
Year	Result	Pos	№	Pld	W	L	T	NR
(Australia) 1988	Did not qualify							
(South Africa) 1998	Did not qualify							
(Sri Lanka) 2000	Did not qualify							
(New Zealand) 2002	Did not qualify							
(Bangladesh) 2004	Did not qualify							
(Sri Lanka) 2006	Did not qualify							
(Malaysia) 2008	Did not qualify							
(New Zealand) 2010	Did not qualify							
(Australia) 2012	Did not qualify							
(United Arab Emirates) 2014	Did not qualify							
(Bangladesh) 2016	Did not qualify							
(New Zealand) 2018	Did not qualify							
(South Africa) 2020	Did not qualify							
(Cricket West Indies) 2022	Did not qualify							
(South Africa) 2024	Did not qualify							
(Zimbabwe) (Namibia) 2026	To be determined							
Total	0 Title	0	0	0	0	0	0	0

=== ACC Under-19 Premier Cup ===
ACC Under-19 Premier Cup record
Year	Round	Position	GP	W	L	T	NR
(Malaysia) 2023	Group stages	–	3	2	1	0	0
Total	1/1	–	3	2	1	0	0
