= 2023 ACC Men's Under-19 Premier Cup =

Cricket tournament

ACC Men's Under-19 Premier Cup 2023
- Dates: 12 October – 24 October
- Administrator: Asian Cricket Council
- Cricket format: 50 overs
- Tournament format(s): Group round-robin and knockout
- Host: Malaysia
- Champions: Nepal (1st title)
- Runners-up: United Arab Emirates
- Participants: 16
- Matches: 28
- Player of the series: (Nepal) Dipesh Kandel
- Most runs: (Nepal) Dev Khanal (240) (Nepal) Arjun Kumal (240)
- Most wickets: (Nepal) Dipesh Kandel (18) (United Arab Emirates) Aayan Afzal Khan (18)
- Official website: https://asiancricket.org/home

The ACC Men's Under-19 Premier Cup 2023 was a cricket tournament which took place in October 2023. It was the inaugural edition of the ACC Men's Under-19 Premier Cup, a qualifying event for the 2023 ACC Under-19 Asia Cup, and was hosted by Malaysia. Sixteen teams competed to get three qualification spots. In a rain-affected final, Nepal defeated UAE by 19 runs under the DLS method.

== Squads ==
Bahrain	China	Hong Kong	Indonesia	Iran	Japan
Abhinav Girish (c); Muhammad Adil; Muhammad Ali; Anas Obaid; Ayan Obaid; Muhammad Basil; Faisal Rahim; Mounish Swamy; Mohammed Rehaan; Rishabh Ramesh; Sai Sarthak; Shashank Shekhar; Wazir Ahmad; Vishwaesh Gurumurthy	Zeng Shenjian (c); Yank Kang (wk); Li Yanze; Deng Jinqi; Zong Yuechao; Xie Quilai; Ma Qiancheng; Luo Shilin; Li Han; Gong Xiaoliang; Chen Xinghao	Ahan Trivedi (c); Aarez Dar; Abdul Samad Khan; Aliyaan Mohammad; Ansh Doshi; Arya Panjwani; Aryan Chandirmani; Danny Mapp; Darsh Vora; Harry Hodgson; Jayden Botfield; Mudassar Khan; Paraspreet Singh; Shiv Mathur	I Nyoman Adi Budana (c) (wk); I Geda Teguh Pranatha; Erianto; Beni Taruk; I kadek; Komang Bayu Permana; Sahil; Dga Pradipta Diatmika; Marianus Molo; Junison Yusuf; Andreas Alexander Hawoe	Dadrahman Raeisi (c); Amer Khorsand (wk); Arsalan Sheikhi; Esmaeil Bejarzehi; Farhan Bahak; Saber Ebrahimipour; Samaan Sheikhi; Salman Niazmand; Salim Taal; Hanzaleh Derakhshandeh; Zeid Raeisi	Koji Hardgrave-Abe (c); Chihaya Arakawa (WK); Shotaro Hiratsuka; Charles Hinze; Kazuma Kato-Stafford; Hugo Kelly; Daniel Panckhurst; Nihar Parmar; Aditya Phadke; Nikhil Pol; Tomo Rear (WK); Ritvik Sivakumar; Aarav Tiwari; Keifer Yamamoto-Lake
Kuwait	Malaysia	Maldives	Nepal	Oman	Qatar
Jude Saldhna (c); Arsh Sahil; Gautham Mohandas; Hassan Khan; Muhammad Farooq; Vedant Pradeep; Jay Maheshkumar; Kandarp Tushar; Mohamed Raashiq; Henry Thomas; Het Kishore; Haiber Ali; Mohammad Armaan; Rudransh Panchal	Mohammad Hariz Sulhie; Muhammad Ashraf Azmi; Muhammad Rifqi Iman Khamis; Syahir Syamael Shaari; Adeshlie Alias; Ahmad Arif Salman; Haziq Haiqal Idris; Mohamad Aras Azmi; Muhammad Akram Malek; Muhammad Alif; Hairil Harisan; Hamzah Bin; Muhammad Aiman Zaquan; Muhammad Azri Azhar	Mohammed Rayan (c); Yaneeu Ali (wk); Adam Khalaf; Mohamed Miuvaan; Mabsar Abdulla; Ahmed Naisam; Hussain Shaadin; Ahmed Alyan; Ibrahim Azooz; Ali Layaan; Mohamed Saabir Siraj	Dev Khanal (c); Aakash Tripathi; Arjun Kumal; Dipak Bohora; Deepak Bohora; Uttam Thapa Magar; Dipak Dumre; Dipesh Kandel (vc); Hemant Dhami; Durgesh Gupta; Aakash Chand; Subhash Bhandari; Bishal KC; Milan Bohora	Aditya Gurumukhi (c); Ashish Valappil; Giriharan Kuttiraja K; Mohammad Arafat Islam; Mustaqeem Asif Sayed; Saumya Sampat; Aryan Bisht; Lakshmi Narayana Satish; Prateish Ramesh; Varshieth Sai; Wajih Abbas; Rahil Habibullah (Wk); Adharsh Srinivasan; Aditya Girish	Zayed (C); Sreenavas; Taha; Kabeer; Luqmam; Jack; Riyan; Lalit; Jayden; Sawwaf; Ali; Ibrahim; Zaland; Uzair
Saudi Arabia	Singapore	Thailand	United Arab Emirates		
Muhammad Ahmad Raza (c); Mohamed Aqeel (wk); Zuhair Muhammad; Mohammad Zuber Sunasara; Taha Vaseem Amre; Muhammad Ghayour Ahmad; Rayyan Khan; Varun Saravanan Mudaliar; Mohamed Kaif; Shazeeb Mujeebur Rahman; Abdullah Shiraz; Arham Atif	Jeevan Santhanam (C); Aaryan Menon; Aaryan Modi; Venkatesan Thiyanesh; Adwitya Bhargava; Aryaveer Chaudhary; Hariharan Ramani; Shreyan Pattnaik; Kabir Biren (Wk); Pratham Somani (Wk); Harsha Bharadwaj; Pranav Dhanuka; Rahil Khan; Vihaan Hampihallikar	Chaloemwong Chatpaisan (c); Jirasak Pakhiaokajee (wk); Phanuwat Desungnoen; Danuphon Fuangyotpinit; Ashirvad Narayan; Sitthikarn Klahan; Khanitson Namchaikul; Wiraphan Ngowhuad; Anucha Kalasi; Bodhi Martinez; Mohak Dugar	Aayan Afzal Khan; Aryan Saxena; Dhruv Parashar; Ethan Carl D'Souza; Aryansh Sharma (Wk); Tanish Suri; Ammar Badami; Harshit Seth; Maroof Merchant; Muhammad Ismail; Harit Shetty; Akshat Rai; Yayin Rai; Hardik Pai		

== Group stage ==
=== Group A ===
==== Points table ====
Pos	Team	Pld	W	L	NR	Pts	NRR
1	Nepal	3	3	0	0	6	5.629
2	Saudi Arabia	3	2	1	0	4	−0.959
3	Bahrain	3	1	2	0	2	−1.065
4	Iran	3	0	3	0	0	−3.271

Source: ACC Fancode

Advance to the knockout stage

==== Fixtures ====
12 Oct 2023
09:30
Scorecard

Nepal; 353 (40.1 overs)	v	Iran; 79 (30.5 overs)
Dev Khanal 100 (60); Dadrahman Raeisi 3/67 (9 overs)		Amer Khorsand 37 (22); Dipesh Kandel 3/4 (7 overs)

Nepal won by 274 runs
UKM-YSD Cricket Oval, Bangi
Umpires: Riyaz Kurupkar (Qat) and Danesh Ramdhanie (Mas)
Player of the match: Dev Khanal (Nep)

- Iran won the toss and elected to field.

12 Oct 2023
09:30
Scorecard

Saudi Arabia; 225 (46.3 overs)	v	Bahrain; 158 (39.5 overs)
Varun Saravanan Mudaliar 64 (75); Muhammed Shekhar Shukla 5/29 (10 overs)		Sai Sarthak Vaddiraju 42 (66); Abdullah Shiraz 2/18 (5.5 overs)

Saudi Arabia won by 67 runs
Bayuemas Oval, Kuala Lumpur
Player of the match: Varun Saravanan Mudaliar (Sau)

- Saudi Arabia won the toss and elected to bat.

15 October 2023
09:30
Scorecard

Iran; 139 (41 overs)	v	Saudi Arabia; 140/6 (23 overs)
Salim Taal 45 (56); Muhammad Ahmad Raza 3/19 (10 overs)		Mohamed Aqeel 34 (38); Salman Niazmand 4/30 (8 overs)

Saudi Arabia won by 4 wickets
UKM-YSD Cricket Oval, Bangi
Player of the match: Muhammad Ahmad Raza (Sau)

- Saudi Arabia won the toss and elected to field.
- Iran were eliminated as a result of this match.

15 October 2023
09:30
Scorecard

Bahrain; 77 (37.5 overs)	v	Nepal; 78/3 (11.4 overs)
Muhammed Basil Abdul Hakkim 34 (77); Dipesh Kandel 6/4 (9.5 overs)		Dev Khanal 32 (27); Anas Obaid Syed 3/26 (4 overs)

Nepal won by 7 wickets.
Bayuemas Oval, Kuala Lumpur
Player of the match: Dipesh Kandel (Nep)

- Bahrain won the toss and elected to bat.
- Bahrain were eliminated as a result of this match.

17 October 2023
09:30
Scorecard

Bahrain; 207 (38.5 overs)	v	Iran; 145 (40.4 overs)
Sai Sarthak Vaddiraju 49 (51); Samaan Sheikhi 4/24 (7 overs)		Zeid Raeisi 30 (71); Anas Obaid Syed 5/41 (10 overs)

Bahrain won by 62 runs
UKM-YSD Cricket Oval, Bangi
Player of the match: Anas Obaid Syed (Bhr)

- Iran won the toss and elected to field.

19 October 2023
09:30
Scorecard

Nepal; 347/7 (50 overs)	v	Saudi Arabia; 46 (19.1 overs)
Arjun Kumal 142 (111); Muhammad Ghayour Ahmad 2/38 (8 overs)		Varun Saravanan Mudaliar 11 (24); Dipesh Kandel 6/18 (9.1 overs)

Nepal won by 302 runs
UKM-YSD Cricket Oval, Bangi
Player of the match: Arjun Kumal (Nep)

- Saudi Arabia won the toss and elected to field.

=== Group B ===
==== Points table ====
Pos	Team	Pld	W	L	NR	Pts	NRR
1	United Arab Emirates	3	3	0	0	6	4.052
2	Oman	3	2	1	0	4	1.437
3	Qatar	3	1	2	0	2	−1.308
4	China	3	0	3	0	0	−3.386

Source: ACC Fancode

Advance to the knockout stage

==== Fixtures ====
13 October 2023
09:30
Scoreboard

Oman; 122 (29.4 overs)	v	Qatar; 80 (29.4 overs)
Ashish Kumar 24 (48); Sreenivas Venkatakrishnan 6/19 (9.4 overs)		Taha Shahbaz 22 (29); Aryan Raju Bisht 3/20 (9.4 overs)

Oman won by 43 runs
UKM-YSD Cricket Oval, Bangi
Player of the match: Sreenivas Venkatakrishnan (Qtr)

- Oman won the toss and elected to bat.

13 October 2023
09:30
Scorecard

China; 30 (21.5 overs)	v	United Arab Emirates; 31/1 (5.3 overs)
Lou Shilin 8 (33); Aayan Afzal Khan 5/15 (10 overs)		Aryansh Sharma 10* (7); Ma Qiancheng 1/12 (3 overs)

United Arab Emirates won by 9 wickets
Bayuemas Oval, Kuala Lumpur
Player of the match: Aayan Afzal Khan (UAE)

- United Arab Emirates won the toss and elected to field.

16 October 2023
09:30
Scorecard

Oman; 110 (39.3 overs)	v	United Arab Emirates; 111/7 (25.4 overs)
Mustaqeem Asif Sayed 20 (28); Aayan Afzal Khan 3/19 (9 overs)		Aryansh Sharma 25 (20); Mohammed Arafat 5/36 (10 overs)

United Arab Emirates won by 3 wickets
UKM-YSD Cricket Oval, Bangi
Player of the match: Harshit Seth (UAE)

- Oman won the toss and elected to bat.

16 October 2023
09:30
Scorecard

Qatar; 236/8 (50 overs)	v	China; 199/8 (43 overs)
Syed Uzair Raziq 49 (77); Li Han 3/34 (10 overs)		Zheng Shenjia 43 (43); Jack Joeman Joseph 3/33 (9 overs)

Qatar won by 25 runs (DLS method)
Bayuemas Oval, Kuala Lumpur
Player of the match: Riyan Khan (Qat)

- China won the toss and elected to field.
- China were set a revised target of 225 runs in 43 overs due to rain.

18 October 2023
09:30
Scorecard

Oman; 270 (48.5 overs)	v	China; 49 (17.3 overs)
Aditya Parag 100 (83); Luo Shilin 2/29 (10 overs)		Chen Haoran 16 (11); Aryan Raju Bisht 6/20 (6.3 overs)

Oman won by 221 runs
Bayuemas Oval, Kuala Lumpur
Player of the match: Aryan Raju Bisht (Omn)

- China won the toss and elected to field.

19 October 2023
09:30
Scorecard

Qatar; 57 (35.2 overs)	v	United Arab Emirates; 61/0 (6.4 overs)
Taha Shahbaz 17 (80); Aayan Afzal Khan 5/15 (10 overs)		Tanish Suri 39* (23)

United Arab Emirates won by 10 wickets
Bayuemas Oval, Kuala Lumpur
Player of the match: Aayan Afzal Khan (UAE)

- Qatar won the toss and elected to bat.

=== Group C ===
==== Points table ====
Pos	Team	Pld	W	L	NR	Pts	NRR
1	Singapore	3	3	0	0	6	3.535
2	Kuwait	3	1	1	1	3	0.451
3	Thailand	3	1	2	0	2	−1.672
4	Maldives	3	0	2	1	1	−3.901

Source: ACC Fancode

Advance to the knockout stage

==== Fixtures ====
12 October 2023
09:30
Scorecard

Singapore; 290 (49.5 overs)	v	Maldives; 112 (38.1 overs)
Aryaveer Chaudhary 127 (118); Adam Khalaf 3/58 (9.5 overs)		Mabsar Abdulla 23 (38); Aaryan Menon 5/29 (8 overs)

Singapore won by 178 runs
Johor Cricket Academy Oval, Johor
Player of the match: Aryaveer Chaudhary (Sin)

- Singapore won the toss and elected to bat.

13 October 2023
09:30
Scorecard

Thailand; 85 (16.4 overs)	v	Kuwait; 86/2 (13.5 overs)
Chaloemwong Chatpaisan 12 (14); Habier Ali 5/17 (4.4 overs)		Jay Maheshkumar Mehta 44* (51); Sitthikarn Klahan 1/13 (2.5 overs)

Kuwait won by 8 wickets
Johor Cricket Academy Oval, Johor
Player of the match: Habier Ali (Kuw)

- Thailand won the toss and elected to bat.

15 October 2023
09:30
Scorecard

Kuwait; 97 (32.1 overs)	v	Singapore; 99/5 (26.1 overs)
Het Kishorbhai Hinsu 24 (49); Jeevan Santhanam 4/18 (9 overs)		Pratham Somani 48* (77); Rudransh Panchal 2/12 (4 overs)

Singapore won by 5 wickets
Johor Cricket Academy Oval, Johor
Player of the match: Jeevan Santhanam (Sin)

- Singapore won the toss and elected to field.

16 October 2023
09:30
Scorecard

Maldives; 82 (25.2 overs)	v	Thailand; 86/2 (11.5 overs)
Mohammed Rayan 21 (43); Khanitson Namchaikul 4/16 (8 overs)		Chaloemwong Chatpaisan 34* (21); Mohamed Miuvaan 1/12 (2 overs)

Thailand won by 8 wickets
Johor Cricket Academy Oval, Johor
Player of the match: Khanitson Namchaikul (Tha)

- Thailand won the toss and elected to field.

18 October 2023
09:30
Scorecard

Maldives; 56/4 (18 overs)	v	Kuwait
Mabsar Abdulla 19* (43); Habier Ali 2/15 (7 overs)

No results
Johor Cricket Academy Oval, Johor

- Kuwait won the toss and elected to field.
- Match abandoned
- No further play was possible due to rain.

19 October 2023
09:30
Scorecard

Thailand; 52 (16.4 overs)	v	Singapore; 55/1 (8 overs)
Jirasak Pakhiaokajee 16 (29); Pranav Dhanuka 4/4 (4.4 overs)		Pratham Somani 15* (17); Mohak Dugar 1/22 (3 overs)

Singapore won by 9 wickets
Johor Cricket Academy Oval, Johor
Player of the match: Pranav Dhanuka (Sin)

- Singapore won the toss and elected to field.

=== Group D ===
==== Points table ====
Pos	Team	Pld	W	L	NR	Pts	NRR
1	Japan	3	3	0	0	6	1.750
2	Malaysia	3	2	1	0	4	1.531
3	Hong Kong	3	1	2	0	2	1.655
4	Indonesia	3	0	3	0	0	−4.464

Updated to match(es) played on unknown. Source: ACC Fancode

Advance to the knockout stage

==== Fixtures ====
14 October 2023
09:30
Scorecard

Indonesia; 75 (31.4 overs)	v	Hong Kong; 76/2 (13.5 overs)
I Nyoman Adi Budana 18* (57); Paraspreet Singh 4/21 (10 overs)		Abdul Samad Khan 29* (29); Andreas Alexander Hawoe 1/7 (5 overs)

Hong Kong won by 8 wickets
UKM-YSD Cricket Oval, Bangi
Player of the match: Paraspreet Singh (HK)

- Indonesia won the toss and elected to bat.

14 October 2023
09:30
Scorecard

Japan; 169 (43.1 overs)	v	Malaysia; 164 (32.5 overs)
Koji Hardgrave Abe 68 (94); Ahmad Arif Yusof 5/37 (8.1 overs)		Mohammad Rifqi Iman 36 (38); Charlie Hinze 3/23 (6.5 overs)

Japan won by 6 runs (DLS method)
Bayuemas Oval, Kuala Lumpur
Player of the match: Koji Hardgrave Abe (Jpn)

- Malaysia won the toss and elected to field.
- Malaysia were set a revised target of 171 runs due to rain.

17 October 2023
09:30
Scorecard

Indonesia; 30 (15.3 overs)	v	Japan; 31/1 (8.1 overs)
I Gede Teguh Pranatha 6 (22); Charlie Hinze 4/2 (3.3 overs)		Nihar Parmar 16* (23); Made Rama 1/7 (2 overs)

Japan won by 9 wickets
Bayuemas Oval, Kuala Lumpur
Player of the match: Kazuma Kato Stafford (Jpn)

- Japan won the toss and elected to field.

18 October 2023
09:30
Scorecard

Malaysia; 155 (40.1 overs)	v	Hong Kong; 131 (34.4 overs)
Muhammad Akram 35 (57); Shiv Mathur 3/30 (7.1 overs)		Ahan Trivedi 28 (39); Muhammad Azri Azhar 7/25 (8.4 overs)

Malaysia won by 24 runs
UKM-YSD Cricket Oval, Bangi
Player of the match: Muhammad Azri Azhar (Mas)

- Malaysia won the toss and elected to bat.

20 October 2023
09:30
Scorecard

Japan; 238/9 (50 overs)	v	Hong Kong; 106/6 (21.1 overs)
Aditya Phadke 79 (118); Darsh Vora 4/46 (10 overs)		Shiv Mathur 37 (25); Charlie Hinze 2/18 (6.1 overs)

Japan won by 57 runs (DLS method)
UKM-YSD Cricket Oval, Bangi

- Hong Kong won the toss and elected to field.

20 October 2023
09:30
Scorecard

Malaysia; 321 (48.4 overs)	v	Indonesia; 117 (36.5 overs)
Mohammad Hairil 61 (91); Erianto 3/37 (6.4 overs)		Junison Yusuf 22 (58); Ahmad Arif Yusof 3/17 (10 overs)

Malaysia won by 205 runs
Bayuemas Oval, Kuala Lumpur
Player of the match: Muhammad Azri Azhar (Mas)

- Malaysia won the toss and elected to bat.

== Knockout stage ==
=== Bracket ===
Semi-finals
A1	Nepal	140/2 (25)
D1	Japan	43/9 (11.5)
B1	United Arab Emirates	115/0 (14.4)
C1	Singapore	156 (49)

Final
A1	Nepal	280/8 (50)
B1	United Arab Emirates	178 (26.5)
3rd place play-off
D1	Japan	164 (49.4)
C1	Singapore	131/8 (40)

=== Semi-finals ===
==== 1st semi-final ====
21 October 2023
07:15
Scorecard

Nepal; 140/2 (25 overs)	v	Japan; 43/9 (11.5 overs)
Deepak Bohara 79 (70); Kazuma Kato Stafford 1/25 (6 overs)		Shotaro Hiratsuka 15 (21); Hemant Dhami 3/8 (3 overs)

Nepal won by 143 runs (DLS method)
Bayuemas Oval, Kuala Lumpur
Player of the match: Deepak Bohara (Nep)

- Japan won the toss and elected to field.
- Japan were set a revised target of 187 runs from 22 overs due to rain.

==== 2nd semi-final ====
21 October 2023
09:30
Scorecard

Singapore; 156 (49 overs)	v	United Arab Emirates; 115/0 (15.5 overs)
Pratham Somani 41 (80); Hardik Pai 3/25 (10 overs)		Tanish Suri 59* (50); Aryan Menon 18/0 (2 overs)

United Arab Emirates won by 10 wickets (DLS method)
UKM-YSD Cricket Oval, Bangi
Player of the match: Tanish Suri (UAE)

- United Arab Emirates won the toss and elected to field.
- United Arab Emirates were set a revised target of 113 runs from 27 overs due to rain.

=== 3rd place play-off ===
23 October 2023
09:30
Scorecard

Japan; 164 (49.4 overs)	v	Singapore; 131/8 (40 overs)
Aditya Phadke 28 (55); Harsha Bharadwaj 3/20 (8 overs)		Aryaveer Chaudhary 34 (57); Aarav Tiwari 3/26 (7 overs)

Japan won by 16 runs (DLS method)
UKM-YSD Cricket Oval, Bangi
Umpires: Rahat Ali (Sau) and Aasif Iqbal (UAE)
Player of the match: Charlie Hinze (Jpn)

- Japan won the toss and elected to bat.

=== Final ===
24 October 2023
09:30
Scorecard

Nepal; 280/8 (50 overs)	v	United Arab Emirates; 178 (26.5 overs)
Dev Khanal 100 (92); Harit Shetty 5/45 (8 overs)		Dhruv Parashar 59 (49); Aakash Tirpathi 4/36 (5 overs)

Nepal won by 19 runs (DLS method)
Bayuemas Oval, Kuala Lumpur
Umpires: Vinod Babu (Omn) and Tabarak Dar (HK)
Player of the match: Dev Khanal (Nep)

- Nepal won the toss and elected to bat.
- United Arab Emirates were set a revised target of 198 runs from 27 overs due to rain.

== See also ==
- 2023 ACC Men's Premier Cup
