= Afghanistan national under-19 cricket team =

National sports team

Afghanistan
- Nickname: Afghanistan Youth (AFGY)

Personnel
- Captain: Suliman Safi
- Coach: Rais Ahmadzai
- Fielding coach: Shapoor Zadran
- Owner: Afghanistan Cricket Board

Team information
- Founded: 2009; 17 years ago
- Home ground: Kabul International Cricket Stadium

The Afghanistan national under-19 cricket team (Pashto: د افغانستان ۱۹ کلنو لوبډله) represents Afghanistan in under-19 international cricket.

Afghanistan has qualified for the Under-19 Cricket World Cup on seven occasions. The team's first tournament was the 2010 World Cup in New Zealand, which they reached by finishing runner-up to Ireland in the 2009 World Cup Qualifier. Afghanistan has qualified for every subsequent World Cup. Although the team placed 16th and last in its first tournament in 2010, it rapidly became one of the leading under-19 teams in Asia. Afghanistan finished seventh at the 2014 World Cup in the UAE, setting a new record for the best finish by an ICC associate member (equalled by Namibia in 2016). After becoming an ICC full member, Afghanistan reached the semi-finals of the 2018 Under-19 World Cup in New Zealand.

Outside of the Under-19 World Cup, Afghanistan participates in the annual ACC Under-19 Cup. The team won the tournament in 2017, defeating Pakistan in the final. Afghanistan also plays occasional bilateral series against other Asian under-19 teams.

The team reached the semi-finals in the 2022 Under-19 World Cup, where they lost to England.

== History ==
The team played in the 2010 Under-19 Cricket World Cup in New Zealand. Afghanistan were drawn in Group A, where they played England, Hong Kong and India. Afghanistan got a wooden spoon in this World Cup.

Afghanistan played in the 2012 Under-19 Cricket World Cup. They played against Pakistan, New Zealand and Scotland.

Afghanistan had qualified for 2014 Under-19 Cricket World Cup. They were drawn against Australia, Bangladesh & Namibia in group B who they beat, qualifying for Super league, where they lost to South Africa. They finished tournament well by securing 7th position.

=== At the Asia cup ===
The team made it to the semifinals of the 2016 ACC Under-19 Asia Cup, losing out to India by 77 runs. In the league stages of the tournament Afghanistan lost their first match, being defeated by Bangladesh. However, they won their next two matches against Pakistan and Singapore. They advanced to the semifinals on the basis of NRR.

Afghanistan won the 2017 ACC Under-19 Asia Cup, defeating Pakistan in the final by a huge margin of 185 runs. In the league stages, Afghanistan won their matches against Pakistan and UAE but lost to Sri Lanka. They faced Nepal in the semifinals, whom they defeated by 7 wickets.

In the 2025 ACC Under-19 Asia Cup, Afghanistan failed to proceed beyond the group stage, where they were beaten by both Bangladesh and Sri Lanka and managed only a single win, in an "inconsequential" last group game against Nepal.

== Tournament history ==
A red box around the year indicates tournaments played within Afghanistan

Key
Champions
Runners-up
Semi-finals

=== ICC Under-19 Cricket World Cup ===
Afghanistan's U19 World Cup record
Year	Result	Pos	№	Pld	W	L	T	NR
(Australia) 1988	Ineligible – not an ICC member							
(South Africa) 1998	Ineligible – not an ICC member							
(Sri Lanka) 2000	Ineligible – not an ICC member							
(New Zealand) 2002	Did not enter							
(Bangladesh) 2004	Did not enter							
(Sri Lanka) 2006	Did not qualify							
(Malaysia) 2008	Did not qualify							
(New Zealand) 2010	First round	16th	16	6	1	5	0	0
(Australia) 2012	First round	10th	16	6	3	3	0	0
(United Arab Emirates) 2014	Quarter-finals	7th	16	6	3	3	0	0
(Bangladesh) 2016	First round	9th	16	6	4	2	0	0
(New Zealand) 2018	Semi-finals	4th	16	6	3	2	0	1
(South Africa) 2020	Quarter-finals	7th	16	6	3	2	0	1
(Cricket West Indies) 2022	Semi-finals	4th	16	6	3	3	0	0
(South Africa) 2024	First round	13th	16	4	1	3	0	0
(Zimbabwe) (Namibia) 2026	Semi-finals	4th	16	6	4	2	0	0
Total				52	25	25	0	2

== Records ==
All records listed are for under-19 One Day International (ODI) matches only.

=== Team records ===
Highest totals

- 340/9 (50 overs), v. Fiji, at Sheikh Kamal International Cricket Stadium, Cox's Bazar, 5 February 2016
- 336/7 (50 overs), v. Scotland, at Allan Border Field, Brisbane, 21 August 2012
- 309/6 (50 overs), v. New Zealand, at Hagley Oval, Christchurch, 25 January 2018
- 284/7 (50 overs), v. Sri Lanka, at Cobham Oval, Whangārei, 17 January 2018
- 265/6 (50 overs), v. United Arab Emirates, at North-West University No. 1 Ground, Potchefstroom, 22 January 2020

Lowest totals

- 77 (34.2 overs), v. Bangladesh, at Sylhet International Cricket Stadium, Sylhet, 28 September 2017
- 86 (32.2 overs), v. United States, at Nelson Park, Napier, 27 January 2010
- 101 (42.3 overs), v. Bangladesh, at Sylhet International Cricket Stadium, Sylhet, 12 September 2021
- 101 (39.4 overs), v. Bangladesh, at Sylhet International Cricket Stadium, Sylhet, 14 September 2021
- 113 (35.0 overs), v. India, at Ekana Cricket Stadium B Ground, 28 November 2019

=== Individual records ===
Most career runs

- 594 – Ibrahim Zadran (2017–2020)
- 425 – Hashmatullah Shahidi (2010–2014)
- 407 – Javed Ahmadi (2010–2012)
- 382 – Ikram Alikhil (2016–2018)
- 363 – Farhan Zakhil (2019–2020)

Highest individual scores

- 156 (132 balls) – Karim Janat, v. Fiji, at Sheikh Kamal International Cricket Stadium, Cox's Bazar, 5 February 2016
- 134 (111 balls) – Javed Ahmadi, v. Scotland, at Allan Border Field, Brisbane, 21 August 2012
- 107* (113 balls) – Ikram Alikhil, v. Pakistan, at Kinrara Academy Oval, Kuala Lumpur, 19 November 2017
- 106* (142 balls) – Tariq Stanikzai, v. Zimbabwe, at Sheikh Kamal International Cricket Stadium, Cox's Bazar, 12 February 2016
- 91* (132 balls) – Farhan Zakhil, v. Australia, at North-West University No. 1 Ground, Potchefstroom, 2 February 2020

Most career wickets

- 35 – Mujeeb Ur Rahman (2017–2018)
- 29 – Shafiqullah Ghafari (2019–2020)
- 27 – Qais Ahmad (2017–2018)
- 22 – Noor Ahmad (2019–2020)
- 21 – Aftab Alam (2010–2012)

Best bowling performances

- 7/19 (9.3 overs) – Mujeeb Ur Rahman, v. Bangladesh, at Sylhet International Cricket Stadium, Sylhet, 4 October 2017
- 6/15 (9.1 overs) – Shafiqullah Ghafari, v. South Africa, at Diamond Oval, Kimberley, 17 January 2020
- 6/23 (10 overs) – Mujeeb Ur Rahman, v. Pakistan, at Kinrara Academy Oval, Kuala Lumpur, 10 November 2017
- 6/33 (10 overs) – Aftab Alam, v. Papua New Guinea, at Nelson Park, Napier, 24 January 2010
- 5/15 (7.1 overs) – Mujeeb Ur Rahman, v. Pakistan, at Kinrara Academy Oval, Kuala Lumpur, 19 November 2017

== Current squad ==
The Afghanistan U-19 Cricket squad selected for 2020 Under-19 Cricket World Cup:

- Nauman shah (c)
- Yama Arab
- Sediqullah Atal
- Shafiqullah Ghafari
- Fazalhaq Farooqi
- Imran Mir
- Jamshid Miralikhil
- Abid Mohammadi
- Mohammad Ishaq (wk)
- Asif Musazai
- Abdul Rahman
- Abidullah Taniwal
- Ibrahim Zadran
- Rahmanullah
- Zohaib

== See also ==
- Afghanistan u19 tour of Nepal
