= Nepal national under-19 cricket team =

National cricket team

Nepal national Under-19 cricket team
- नेपाली यु-१९ क्रिकेट टोली
- Nickname: Nepal Youth (NEPY)

Personnel
- Captain: Sumit Pokharel
- Coach: Shakti Gauchan
- Owner: Cricket Association of Nepal

Team information
- City: Kathmandu
- Colours: Red and Blue
- Founded: 1998; 28 years ago
- Home ground: Tribhuvan University International Cricket Ground; Mulpani Cricket Stadium

International Cricket Council
- ICC region: Asia
- Official website: cricketnepal.org.np

Nepal national cricket teams
Women's	Men's	Men's A	Women's U19	Men's U19	Blind Men's

The Nepal national under-19 cricket team (Nepali: नेपाल अन्डर-१९ राष्ट्रिय क्रिकेट टोली) represents Nepal in under-19 international cricket. It is governed by the Cricket Association of Nepal (CAN). Nepal is an associate member of International Cricket Council (ICC).

Nepal has historically been one of the strongest associate members at the Under-19 Cricket World Cup, qualifying on eight occasions and thrice advancing to the second round (in 2000, 2016 and 2024). The team has recorded World Cup victories against many full member teams.

== Overview ==
At its height, Nepal Under-19 team became Plate Champions of 2006 ICC Under-19 Cricket World Cup, defeating a Test Nation New Zealand by one wicket at Paikiasothy Saravanamuttu Stadium, Sri Lanka on 18 Feb 2006. The team was also a finalist in the Plate Championship in 2002 and 2008. Out of nine U-19 World Cup Cricket tournament, Nepal has participated in six (2000, 2002, 2004, 2006, 2008 and 2012). They qualified for the 2012 ICC Under-19 Cricket World Cup after a second-place finish, behind only Scotland and ahead of hosts Ireland at the 10-team World Cup qualifying tournament. Nepal did not qualify for the tournament in 1998, 2010 and 2014. In the first U-19 world cup in 1988, Nepal was not a member of ACC.

On the Asian level, the Nepal U-19 team plays in the ACC U-19 Elite Cup, which is the senior level of ACC Under-19 Cup and which is also the first level qualification tournament of the ICC Under-19 Cricket World Cup Qualifier. Out of eight tournaments, Nepal has won four times, in 2001, 2003, 2005, and 2007, and twice has been a finalist, in 1999 and 2011. In 1997 and 2009, Nepal could not make it to the final. The Nepal U-19 cricket team didn not qualify for 2014 ICC Under-19 Cricket World Cup. Nepal qualified for the 2016 ICC Under-19 Cricket World Cup after winning the 2015 ICC Under-19 Cricket World Cup Qualifier.

At the 2016 Under-19 Cricket World Cup, there were some concerns about the eligibility of Nepal's captain, Raju Rijal, with reports stating he was over 19 years of age. However, the ICC were satisfied that his date of birth was correct. As a result, Nepal finished in 8th position, Which is their best result in the U-19 World cup, along with the result in the 2000 U-19 world cup.

== Tournament history ==
A red box around the year indicates tournaments played within Nepal.

Key
Champions
Runners-up
3rd position

=== Under-19 World Cup ===
U19 World Cup record								World Cup Qualification record								
Year	Result	Position	P	W	L	D	NR	Year	Result	Position	P	W	L	D	NR	Remarks
(Australia) 1988	Did not enter (no team)							Did not enter (no team)								
(South Africa) 1998	Did not participate							Did not participate								
(Sri Lanka) 2000	Second round	8/16	6	1	3	0	2	Direct entry								
(New Zealand) 2002	First round	10/16	8	6	2	0	0	Direct entry								
(Bangladesh) 2004	First round	13/16	6	3	3	0	0	Direct entry								
(Sri Lanka) 2006	First round	9/16	6	4	2	0	0	Direct entry								
(Malaysia) 2008	First round	10/16	6	3	3	0	0	Direct entry								
(New Zealand) 2010	Did not qualify							(Canada) 2009	Did not qualify							
(Australia) 2012	First round	13/16	6	2	4	0	0	2011	Round Robin	2/10	9	7	2	0	0	Qualified
(United Arab Emirates) 2014	Did not qualify							Champion of 2013 ACC Under-19 Elite Cup qualified								
(Bangladesh) 2016	Quarter-finals	8/16	6	2	4	0	0	(Malaysia) 2015	Winners	1/5	5	5	0	0	0	Qualified
(New Zealand) 2018	Did not qualify							(Singapore) 2017	Round Robin	2/4	6	4	2	0	0	Part of Asia U19 Division 1
(South Africa) 2020	Did not qualify							(Malaysia) 2019	Round Robin	2/6	5	4	1	0	0	Part of Asia U19 Division 1
(Cricket West Indies) 2022	Did not qualify							(United Arab Emirates) 2021	Qualification cancelled due to Covid-19							Part of Asia U19 Division 1
(South Africa) 2024	Super Six	11/16	5	1	4	0	0	(United Arab Emirates) 2024	Winners	1/5	5	5	0	0	0	Part of Asia U19 Division 1
(Namibia) (Zimbabwe) 2026	Did not qualify							(Nepal) 2026	Round Robin	2/5	4	3	0	0	1	Part of Asia U19 Division 1
TBD; 2028	TBD							TBD; 2028	TBD							Part of Asia U19 Division 1
Total	Quarter-finals	8/16	49	22	25	0	2	Total	2 Titles	5/6	34	28	5	0	1	Qualified on Multiple Occasions

=== ACC Under-19 Asia Cup ===
Year	Result	Position	P	W	L	D	NR
(Bangladesh) 1989	Did not enter (no team)						
(Pakistan) 2003	Did not participate						
(Malaysia) 2012	Group stage	6/8	3	1	2	0	0
(United Arab Emirates) 2013/14	Group stage	6/8	3	1	2	0	0
(Sri Lanka) 2016	Group stage	6/8	3	1	2	0	0
(Malaysia) 2017	Semi-final	4/8	4	2	2	0	0
(Bangladesh) 2018	Group stage	6/8	3	1	2	0	0
(Sri Lanka) 2019	Group stage	5/8	3	1	2	0	0
(United Arab Emirates) 2021	Group stage	7/8	3	0	3	0	0
(United Arab Emirates) 2023	Group stage	7/8	3	0	3	0	0
(United Arab Emirates) 2024	Group stage	6/8	3	1	2	0	0
(United Arab Emirates) 2025	Group Stage	7/8	3	0	3	0	0
(Oman) 2026	TBD						
Total	Semi-final	7/8	31	8	23	0	0

=== ACC Under-19 Premier Cup ===
Year	Result	Position	P	W	L	D	NR
Youth Asia Cup
(Hong Kong) 1997	Second round	4/8	6	2	4	0	0
(Singapore) 1999	Runners-up	2/8	5	2	1	0	2
(Nepal) 2001	Champions						
(Pakistan) 2003	Champions	1/10	6	4	0	0	2
ACC U-19 Cup
(Nepal) 2005	Champions	1/15	5	5	0	0	0
ACC U-19 Elite
(Malaysia) 2007	Champions	1/10	6	5	0	0	1
(Kuwait) 2009	Semi-final	3/10	6	4	2	0	0
(Thailand) 2011	Runners-up	2/10	6	5	1	0	0
(Malaysia) 2013	Semi-final	4/10	6	4	2	0	0
ACC U-19 Premier
(Kuwait) 2014	Runners-up	2/6	5	4	1	0	0
(Malaysia) 2015	Runners-up	2/6	5	4	1	0	0
(Malaysia) 2023	Champions	1/16	5	5	0	0	0
(United Arab Emirates) 2025	Runners-up	2/14	4	3	1	0	0
ACC U-19 Eastern Region
(Malaysia) 2017	Champions	1/8	5	5	0	0	0
(Malaysia) 2019	Champions	1/7	4	4	0	0	0

== Records ==
All records listed are for under-19 One Day International (ODI) matches only.

=== Team records ===
Highest totals

- 238/7 (50 overs), v. New Zealand, at Khan Shaheb Osman Ali Stadium, Fatullah, 28 January 2016
- 238/9 (50 overs), v. New Zealand, at Buffalo Park, South Africa, 21 January 2024
- 234/8 (50 overs), v. Ireland, at Nondescripts Cricket Club, Colombo, 9 February 2006
- 219/7 (50 overs), v. Namibia, at Peter Burge Oval, Brisbane, 21 August 2012
- 214/8 (50 overs), v. South Africa, at Nondescripts Cricket Club, Colombo, 16 February 2006
- 211/9 (50 overs), v. Bangladesh, at Shere Bangla National Stadium, Mirpur, 5 February 2016

Lowest totals

- 74 (25.3 overs), v. West Indies, at Bayuemas Oval, Kuala Lumpur, 1 March 2008
- 79 (27.3 overs), v. Sri Lanka, at Peter Burge Oval, Brisbane, 20 August 2012
- 82 (23.5 overs), v. Australia, at Tony Ireland Stadium, Townsville, 13 August 2012
- 89 (34.2 overs), v. Sri Lanka, at Tyronne Fernando Stadium, Moratuwa, 20 January 2000
- 107 (44.3 overs), v. Kenya, at Asgiriya Stadium, Kandy, 16 January 2000

=== Individual records ===
Most career runs

- 537 – Kanishka Chaugai (2002–2006)
- 385 – Sharad Vesawkar (2004–2006)
- 300 – Paras Khadka (2004–2008)
- 287 – Shakti Gauchan (2002–2004)
- 231 – Bardan Chalise (2002)

Highest individual scores

- 98* (76 balls) – Pradeep Airee, v. Namibia, at Peter Burge Oval, Brisbane, 21 August 2012
- 90 (104 balls) - Arjun Kumal, v. New Zealand, at Buffalo Park, South Africa, 21 Jan 2024
- 90* (124 balls) – Kanishka Chaugai, v. Papua New Guinea, at Zahur Ahmed Chowdhury Stadium, Chittagong, 22 February 2004
- 82* (116 balls) – Sharad Vesawkar, v. Ireland, at Nondescripts Cricket Club, Colombo, 9 February 2006
- 82 (121 balls) – Sharad Vesawkar, v. England, at MA Aziz Stadium, Chittagong, 15 February 2004
- 80* (126 balls) – Shakti Gauchan, v. Uganda, at MA Aziz Stadium, Chittagong, 19 February 2004

Most career wickets

- 23 – Rahul Vishwakarma (2008–2012), Paras Khadka (2004–2008)
- 20 – Binod Das (2000–2002), Lakpa Lama (2002–2004)
- 19 – Manjeet Shrestha (2002–2004)

Best bowling performances

- 6/3 (6.2 overs) – Rahul Vishwakarma, v. Papua New Guinea, at Peter Burge Oval, Brisbane, 23 August 2012
- 5/21 (7.3 overs) – Bhuvan Karki, v. Namibia, at Peter Burge Oval, Brisbane, 21August 2012
- 5/27 (10 overs) – Sandeep Lamichhane, v. Ireland, at Khan Shaheb Osman Ali Stadium, Fatullah, 30 January 2016
- 5/34 (8 overs) – Aakash Chand, v. Afghanistan, at Buffalo Park, South Africa, 26 Jan 2024
- 5/44 (8 overs) – Subash Bhandari, v. Bangladesh, at Mangaung Oval, South Africa, 31 Jan 2024
- 4/14 (10 overs) – Lakpa Lama, v. Papua New Guinea, at Hagley Park No 2, Christchurch, 25 January 2002
- 4/15 (10 overs) – Manjeet Shrestha, v. South Africa, at Zahur Ahmed Chowdhury Stadium, Chittagong, 18 February 2004

== Statistics ==
Youth ODI records versus other nations
Opposition	M	W	L	T	NR	Win%	First win
Afghanistan	3	2	1	0	0	66.67%	
Australia	3	0	3	0	0	0.00%	
Bangladesh	3	1	2	0	0	33.33%	6, 7 February 2002
Canada	1	1	0	0	0	100.00%	28 January 2002
England	5	0	5	0	0	0.00%	
India	4	1	3	0	0	25.00%	
Ireland	3	2	1	0	0	66.67%	9 February 2006
Kenya	1	1	0	0	0	100.00%	16 January 2000
Namibia	5	4	1	0	0	80.00%	30 January 2002
New Zealand	3	2	1	0	0	66.67%	18 January 2000
Pakistan	2	1	1	0	0	50.00%	9 February 2016
Papua New Guinea	3	3	0	0	0	100.00%	25 January 2002
Scotland	2	1	1	0	0	50.00%	1 February 2002
South Africa	3	2	0	0	1	100.00%	18 February 2004
Sri Lanka	5	0	5	0	0	0.00%	
Uganda	2	2	0	0	0	100.00%	19 February 2004
United Arab Emirates	4	2	2	0	0	50.00%	10 September 2019
West Indies	1	0	1	0	0	0.00%	
Zimbabwe	3	1	2	0	0	33.33%	24 February 2008
Total	57	27	29	0	1	47.36%	

== Current squad ==
The list of final squad for the 2025 ACC Under-19 Asia Cup

Name	Date of birth	Batting style	Bowling style	Domestic team	NPL	Remarks
Batsman
Vansh Chhetri	22 July 2008 (age 18)	Right-handed	—N/a	Gandaki Province	—N/a	
Niraj Kumar Yadav	7 November 2007 (age 19)	Right-handed	—N/a	Madhesh Province	—N/a	Vice-Captain
Nischal Kshetri	21 December 2008 (age 17)	Right-handed	Right-arm medium	Sudurpaschim Province		—N/a
Roshan Bishwakarma	30 April 2007 (age 19)	Right-handed	—N/a	Bagmati Province	—N/a	
Wicket-keepers
Sahil Patel	5 October 2007 (age 19)	Right-handed	—N/a	Madhesh Province	Biratnagar Kings	
Aashish Lohar	5 October 2007 (age 19)	Right-handed	—N/a	Sudurpashchim Province	—N/a	
Dilsad Ali	3 May 2006 (age 20)	Right-handed	—N/a	Lumbini Province	—N/a	
All-rounders
Abhishek Tiwari	2 September 2007 (age 19)	Right-handed	Right-arm medium fast	Madhesh Province	Pokhara Avengers	
Ashok Dhami	17 February 2007 (age 19)	Right-handed	Slow left-arm orthodox	Sudurpashchim Province	—N/a	Captain
Cibrin Shrestha	10 August 2007 (age 19)	Left-handed	Slow left-arm orthodox	Gandaki Province	—N/a	
Spin Bowlers
Yuvraj Khatri	30 September 2007 (age 19)	Right-handed	Right-arm leg-break	Sudurpaschim Province	Karnali yaks	
Bipin Sharma	25 October 2008 (age 18)	Right-handed	Slow left-arm orthodox	Karnali Province	Karnali Yaks	
Pace Bowlers
Abhishek Tiwari	2 September 2007 (age 19)	Right-handed	Right-arm medium fast	Madhesh Province	Pokhara Avengers	
Dayanand Mandal	28 September 2006 (age 20)	Right-handed	Left-arm medium	Bagmati Province	—N/a	
Nitesh Patel	27 July 2007 (age 19)	Right-handed	Right-arm medium	Madhesh Province	—N/a	

As of 10 Dec 2025

== See also ==
- Nepal national cricket team
- 2006 U-19 World Cup
- Cricket Association of Nepal
- National League Cricket (Nepal)
