= 2025 ACC Under-19 Asia Cup =

Cricket tournament

- Dates: 12 – 21 December 2025
- Administrator: Asian Cricket Council
- Cricket format: 50 overs
- Tournament format(s): Group stage and Knockout stage
- Host: United Arab Emirates
- Champions: Pakistan (2nd title)
- Runners-up: India
- Participants: 8
- Matches: 15
- Player of the series: (Pakistan) Sameer Minhas
- Most runs: (Pakistan) Sameer Minhas (471)
- Most wickets: (India) Deepesh Devendran (14)

The 2025 ACC Under-19 Asia Cup is the twelfth edition of the ACC Under-19 Asia Cup, a limited overs cricket tournament featuring eight Under-19 teams. It took place from 12 to 21 December 2025 in the United Arab Emirates.

Matches were held across two venues in Dubai: the ICC Academy Ground and the Sevens Stadium.

The five full members of the Asian Cricket Council — Afghanistan, Bangladesh, India, Pakistan, and Sri Lanka — participated, along with three qualifying teams from the 2025 ACC Men's Under-19 Premier Cup: Malaysia, Nepal, and the UAE.

Bangladesh were the defending champions, having won their second title after defeating India by 59 runs in the final of the 2024 edition.

On the back of a 172-run knock by Sameer Minhas, Pakistan defeated India by a mammoth 191 runs, to claim their second title as the under-19 Asian cricket champions.

== Teams and qualifications ==
Means of qualification	Date	Host	Berths	Qualified
ICC Full Members	—N/a	—N/a	5	Afghanistan
ICC Full Members	—N/a	—N/a	5	Bangladesh
ICC Full Members	—N/a	—N/a	5	India
ICC Full Members	—N/a	—N/a	5	Pakistan
ICC Full Members	—N/a	—N/a	5	Sri Lanka
2025 ACC Men's Under-19 Premier Cup	1 December 2025	United Arab Emirates	3	Malaysia
2025 ACC Men's Under-19 Premier Cup	1 December 2025	United Arab Emirates	3	Nepal
2025 ACC Men's Under-19 Premier Cup	1 December 2025	United Arab Emirates	3	United Arab Emirates
Total			8	

== Squads ==
Afghanistan	Bangladesh	India	Malaysia
Mehboob Taskin (c, wk); Khalid Ahmadzai (wk); Salam Khan Ahmadzai; Rohullah Arab; Nazeefullah Amiri; Abdul Aziz Khan; Azizullah Miakhil; Uzair Khan Niazi; Nasratullah Nooristani; Osman Sadat; Zaitullah Shaheen; Faisal Khan Shinozada; Khatir Khan Stanikzai; Hafeezullah Zadran; Wahidullah Zadran	Azizul Hakim Tamim (c); Zawad Abrar (vc); Samiun Basir Ratul; Shiekh Parvej Jibon; Rizan Hossain; Shadin Islam; Md. Abdullah; Farid Hasan Faysal; Kalam Siddiki Aleen; Iqbal Hossain Emon; Rifat Beg; Shahriar Al Amin; Ahmed Shahriar; Saad Islam Razin; Md. Shabuj	Ayush Mhatre (c); Vihaan Malhotra (vc); Kanishk Chouhan; Deepesh Devendran; Aaron George; Yuvraj Gohil; Abhigyan Kundu (wk); Udhav Mohan; Henil Patel; Khilan A. Patel; Naman Pushpak; Harvansh Singh (wk); Kishan Kumar Singh; Vaibhav Sooryavanshi; Vedant Trivedi	Deeaz Patro (c); Muhammad Aalif; Jaashwin Krishnamurthi; Hamzah Panggi; Muhammad Akram; Mohammad Hariz Afnan; Azib Wajdi; Muhamad Nurhanif; Che Ahmad Al Atif Che Zaman; Muhd Asyraf Rifaie Mohd Afinid; Mohammad Hairil (wk); Muhammad Fathul Muin; Nagineswaran Sathnakumaran; Syakir Izzudin; Ahmad Tarmimi
Nepal	Pakistan	Sri Lanka	United Arab Emirates
Ashok Dhami (c); Niraj Yadav (vc, wk); Dilsad Ali; Abishek Tiwari; Cibrin Shrestha; Sahil Patel; Dayanand Mandal; Nischal Chhetri; Ashish Lohar (wk); Nitesh Kumar Patel; Chandan Ram; Roshan BK; Bipin Sharma; Vansh Chhetri; Yubraj Khatri	Farhan Yousaf (c); Usman Khan (vc); Huzaifa Ahsan; Ali Hassan Baloch; Ahmed Hussain; Mohammad Huzaifa; Daniyal Ali Khan; Sameer Minhas; Momin Qamar; Ali Raza; Mohammad Sayyam; Niqab Shafiq; Mohammad Shayan (wk); Abdul Subhan; Hamza Zahoor (wk)	Vimath Dinsara (c); Kavija Gamage (vc); Dimantha Mahavithana; Viran Chamuditha; Dulnith Sigera; Chamika Heenatigala; Adham Hilmy; Chamarindu Nethsara; Kithma Vidanapathirana; Sethmika Seneviratne; Sanuja Ninduwara; Kugathas Mathulan; Rasith Nimsara; Vigneshwaran Akash; Tharusha Navodya	Yayin Rai (c); Saleh Amin (wk); Muhammad Bazil Asim; Noorullah Ayobi; Shalom D’ Souza; Karan Dhiman; Naseem Khan; Rayan Khan; Ahmed Khodadad; Prithvi Madhu; Ayaan Misbah; Zainullah Rahmani; Yug Sharma; Aliasgar Shums; Uddish Suri

== Group stage ==
The ACC released the groups and fixture details on 20 November 2025, with group stage comprising 12 matches scheduled to be played from 12 to 17 December 2025.

=== Group A ===
Points table

Pos	Team	Pld	W	L	T	NR	Pts	NRR	Qualification
1	India	3	3	0	0	0	6	4.289	Advance to the Knockout stage
2	Pakistan	3	2	1	0	0	4	1.859	Advance to the Knockout stage
3	United Arab Emirates	3	1	2	0	0	2	−1.537	
4	Malaysia	3	0	3	0	0	0	−4.694	

Source: ESPNcricinfo

==== Fixtures ====
12 December 2025
09:00
Scorecard

India; 433/6 (50 overs)	v	United Arab Emirates; 199/7 (50 overs)
Vaibhav Sooryavanshi 171 (95); Yug Sharma 2/75 (10 overs)		Uddish Suri 78* (106); Deepesh Devendran 2/21 (7 overs)

India won by 234 runs
ICC Academy Ground, Dubai
Umpires: Ravindra Kottahachchi (SL) and Ajmal Shamolzi (Afg)
Player of the match: Vaibhav Sooryavanshi (Ind)

- United Arab Emirates won the toss and elected to field.

12 December 2025
09:00
Scorecard

Pakistan; 345/3 (50 overs)	v	Malaysia; 48 (19.4 overs)
Sameer Minhas 177* (148); Nagineswaran Sathnakumaran 2/91 (10 overs)		Muhammad Akram 9 (16); Ali Raza 3/11 (6 overs)

Pakistan won by 297 runs
The Sevens Stadium, Dubai
Umpires: Himal Giri (Nep) and Muhammad Kamruzzaman (Ban)
Player of the match: Sameer Minhas (Pak)

- Malaysia won the toss and elected to field.

14 December 2025
09:00
Scorecard

India; 240 (46.1 overs)	v	Pakistan; 150 (41.2 overs)
Aaron George 85 (88); Abdul Subhan 3/42 (9.1 overs)		Huzaifa Ahsan 70 (83); Deepesh Devendran 3/16 (7 overs)

India won by 90 runs
ICC Academy Ground, Dubai
Umpires: Farooq Khan (Afg) and Ravindra Kottahachchi (SL)
Player of the match: Kanishk Chouhan (Ind)

- Pakistan won the toss and elected to field.
- The match was reduced to 49 overs per side due to rain.

14 December 2025
09:00
Scorecard

United Arab Emirates; 298/7 (47 overs)	v	Malaysia; 220/9 (47 overs)
Ayaan Misbah 163 (153); Muhammad Akram 3/62 (9 overs)		Muhammad Aalif 54 (55); Muhammad Bazil Asim 3/28 (6 overs)

United Arab Emirates won by 78 runs
The Sevens Stadium, Dubai
Umpires: Rashid Riaz (Pak) and Ajmal Shamolzi (Afg)
Player of the match: Ayaan Misbah (UAE)

- Malaysia won the toss and elected to field.
- The match was reduced to 47 overs per side due to rain.

16 December 2025
09:00
Scorecard

Pakistan; 241/9 (50 overs)	v	United Arab Emirates; 171 (37.5 overs)
Ahmed Hussain 65 (91); Yug Sharma 3/52 (10 overs)		Ayaan Misbah 77 (74); Abdul Subhan 4/31 (7.5 overs)

Pakistan won by 70 runs
ICC Academy Ground, Dubai
Umpires: Himal Giri (Nep) and Muhammad Kamruzzaman (Ban)
Player of the match: Abdul Subhan (Pak)

- Pakistan won the toss and elected to bat.

16 December 2025
09:00
Scorecard

India; 408/7 (50 overs)	v	Malaysia; 93 (32.1 overs)
Abhigyan Kundu 209* (125); Muhammad Akram 5/89 (10 overs)		Hamzah Panggi 35 (52); Deepesh Devendran 5/22 (7 overs)

India won by 315 runs
The Sevens Stadium, Dubai
Umpires: Nadeem Anjum (UAE) and Ravindra Kottahachchi (SL)
Player of the match: Abhigyan Kundu (Ind)

- Malaysia won the toss and elected to field.

=== Group B ===
Points table

Pos	Team	Pld	W	L	T	NR	Pts	NRR	Qualification
1	Bangladesh	3	3	0	0	0	6	1.214	Advance to the Knockout stage
2	Sri Lanka	3	2	1	0	0	4	0.836	Advance to the Knockout stage
3	Afghanistan	3	1	2	0	0	2	0.710	
4	Nepal	3	0	3	0	0	0	−2.933	

Source: ESPNcricinfo

==== Fixtures ====
13 December 2025
09:00
Scorecard

Afghanistan; 283/7 (50 overs)	v	Bangladesh; 284/7 (48.5 overs)
Faisal Shinozada 103 (94); Shahriar Ahmed 2/45 (8 overs)		Zawad Abrar 96 (112); Khatir Stanikzai 2/46 (6.5 overs)

Bangladesh won by 3 wickets
ICC Academy Ground, Dubai
Umpires: Nadeem Anjum (UAE) and Ulhas Gandhe (Ind)
Player of the match: Zawad Abrar (Ban)

- Afghanistan won the toss and elected to bat.

13 December 2025
09:00
Scorecard

Nepal; 82 (28.5 overs)	v	Sri Lanka; 84/2 (14.5 overs)
Cibrin Shrestha 18 (43); Sethmika Seneviratne 5/25 (9.5 overs)		Dimantha Mahavithana 39 (49); Dayanand Mandal 1/16 (3 overs)

Sri Lanka won by 8 wickets
The Sevens Stadium, Dubai
Umpires: Farooq Khan (Afg) and Rashid Riaz (Pak)
Player of the match: Sethmika Seneviratne (SL)

- Sri Lanka won the toss and elected to field.

15 December 2025
09:00
Scorecard

Afghanistan; 235 (50 overs)	v	Sri Lanka; 238/8 (49.2 overs)
Osman Sadat 52 (87); Dulnith Sigera 3/33 (4 overs)		Viran Chamuditha 62 (83); Nooristani Omarzai 3/52 (10 overs)

Sri Lanka won by 2 wickets
ICC Academy Ground, Dubai
Umpires: Ulhas Gandhe (Ind) and Muhammad Kamruzzaman (Ban)
Player of the match: Chamika Heenatigala (SL)

- Afghanistan won the toss and elected to bat.

15 December 2025
09:00
Scorecard

Nepal; 130 (31.5 overs)	v	Bangladesh; 135/3 (24.5 overs)
Abhisekh Tiwari 30 (43); Md Sobuj 3/27 (7 overs)		Zawad Abrar 70* (68); Yuvraj Khatri 1/18 (3.5 overs)

Bangladesh won by 7 wickets
The Sevens Stadium, Dubai
Umpires: Nadeem Anjum (UAE) and Rashid Riaz (Pak)
Player of the match: Zawad Abrar (Ban)

- Bangladesh won the toss and elected to field.

17 December 2025
09:00
Scorecard

Bangladesh; 225 (46.3 overs)	v	Sri Lanka; 186 (49.1 overs)
Zawad Abrar 49 (36); Kavija Gamage 4/38 (10 overs)		Chamika Heenatigala 41 (67); Shahriar Ahmed 3/27 (10 overs)

Bangladesh won by 39 runs
ICC Academy Ground, Dubai
Umpires: Farooq Khan (Afg) and Rashid Riaz (Pak)
Player of the match: Iqbal Hossain Emon (Ban)

- Sri Lanka won the toss and elected to field.

17 December 2025
09:00
Scorecard

Nepal; 124 (46.4 overs)	v	Afghanistan; 125/4 (26.5 overs)
Dilsad Ali 32 (68); Zaitullah Shaheen 3/19 (10 overs)		Uzairullah Niazai 61 (59); Abhisekh Tiwari 2/21 (4 overs)

Afghanistan won by 6 wickets
The Sevens Stadium, Dubai
Umpires: Nadeem Anjum (UAE) and Ravindra Kottahachchi (SL)
Player of the match: Zaitullah Shaheen (Afg)

- Afghanistan won the toss and elected to field.

== Knockout stage ==
=== Bracket ===
Semi-finals
A1	India	139/2 (18 overs)
B2	Sri Lanka	138/8 (20 overs)
B1	Bangladesh	121 (26.3 overs)
A2	Pakistan	122/2 (16.3 overs)

Final
A1	India	156 (26.2 overs)
A2	Pakistan	347/8 (50 overs)

=== Semi-finals ===
Semi-final 1
19 December 2025
09:00
Scorecard

Sri Lanka; 138/8 (20 overs)	v	India; 139/2 (18 overs)
Chamika Heenatigala 42 (38); Henil Patel 2/31 (4 overs)		Vihaan Malhotra 61* (45); Rasith Nimsara 2/31 (4 overs)

India won by 8 wickets
ICC Academy Ground, Dubai
Umpires: Muhammad Kamruzzaman (Ban) and Ajmal Shamolzi (Afg)
Player of the match: Vihaan Malhotra (Ind)

- India won the toss and elected to field.
- The match was reduced to 20 overs per side due to rain.

Semi-final 2
19 December 2025
09:00
Scorecard

Bangladesh; 121 (26.3 overs)	v	Pakistan; 122/2 (16.3 overs)
Samiun Basir 33 (37); Abdul Subhan 4/20 (6 overs)		Sameer Minhas 69* (57); Samiun Basir 1/17 (3 overs)

Pakistan won by 8 wickets
The Sevens Stadium, Dubai
Umpires: Farooq Khan (Afg) and Ravindra Kottahachchi (SL)
Player of the match: Abdul Subhan (Pak)

- Pakistan won the toss and elected to field.
- The match was reduced to 27 overs per side due to rain.

=== Final ===
21 December 2025
09:00
Scorecard

Pakistan; 347/8 (50 overs)	v	India; 156 (26.2 overs)
Sameer Minhas 172 (113); Deepesh Devendran 3/83 (10 overs)		Deepesh Devendran 36 (16); Ali Raza 4/42 (6.2 overs)

Pakistan won by 191 runs
ICC Academy Ground, Dubai
Umpires: Muhammad Kamruzzaman (Ban) and Ravindra Kottahachchi (SL)
Player of the match: Sameer Minhas (Pak)

- India won the toss and elected to field.
