= 2016 ACC Under-19 Asia Cup =

Cricket tournament

- Dates: 15 – 23 December 2016
- Administrator: Asian Cricket Council
- Cricket format: 50-over
- Tournament format(s): Round-robin, playoffs
- Host: Sri Lanka
- Champions: India (5th title)
- Runners-up: Sri Lanka
- Participants: 8
- Matches: 15
- Player of the series: (India) Himanshu Rana
- Most runs: (India) Himanshu Rana (283)
- Most wickets: (India) Rahul Chahar (Sri Lanka) Praveen Jayawickrama (10)

The 2016 ACC Under-19 Asia Cup was the 5th edition of ACC Under-19 Cup.The cricket tournament that was held in Sri Lanka from 15 to 23 December 2016. It formed part of the qualification process for the 2018 Under-19 World Cup. Eight teams participated in the tournament, with the six Asian teams at the 2016 Under-19 World Cup being joined by the top two teams from the 2016 Asia Division Two event. India won the tournament, beating Sri Lanka by 34 runs in the final.

== Teams ==
No.	Teams	Qualification method
1	India	automatically qualified
2	Pakistan	automatically qualified
3	Bangladesh	automatically qualified
4	Sri Lanka	automatically qualified
5	Afghanistan	automatically qualified
6	Nepal	automatically qualified
7	Malaysia	qualified through 2016 Asia; Division Two
8	Singapore	qualified through 2016 Asia; Division Two

== Group stage ==
=== Group A ===
Pos	Team	Pld	W	L	NR	BP	Pts	NRR
1	India	3	3	0	0	3	15	2.554
2	Sri Lanka (H)	3	2	1	0	1	9	0.746
3	Nepal	3	1	2	0	0	4	−0.334
4	Malaysia	3	0	3	0	0	0	−2.817

Source: ESPNcricinfo
(H) Host

Advanced to semi-finals

=== Matches ===
11 December
Scorecard

India; 289/8 (50 overs)	v	Malaysia; 54 (22.3 overs)

India won by 235 runs
Colombo Cricket Club Ground, Colombo

15 December
Scorecard

Sri Lanka; 227/8 (50 overs)	v	Nepal; 226 (49.3 overs)

Sri Lanka won by 1 run
Nondescripts Cricket Club Ground, Colombo

16 December
Scorecard

Nepal; 172/9 (50 overs)	v	India; 174/4 (33.3 overs)

India won by 6 wickets
Colombo Cricket Club Ground, Colombo

16 December
Scorecard

Malaysia; 104 (38.2 overs)	v	Sri Lanka; 108/2 (18 overs)

Sri Lanka won by 8 wickets
Tyronne Fernando Stadium, Moratuwa

18 December
Scorecard

Sri Lanka; 207 (48.5 overs)	v	India; 208/4 (39.5 overs)

India won by 6 wickets
Tyronne Fernando Stadium, Moratuwa

18 December
Scorecard

Malaysia; 153 (44.4 overs)	v	Nepal; 154/9 (44.4 overs)

Nepal won by 1 wicket
Nondescripts Cricket Club Ground, Colombo

=== Group B ===
Pos	Team	Pld	W	L	NR	BP	Pts	NRR
1	Bangladesh	3	2	1	0	1	9	1.584
2	Afghanistan	3	2	1	0	1	9	1.425
3	Pakistan	3	2	1	0	1	9	1.368
4	Singapore	3	0	3	0	0	0	−11.312

Source: ESPNcricinfo

Advanced to semi-finals

=== Matches ===
15 December
Scorecard

Afghanistan; 146 (48.3 overs)	v	Bangladesh; 150/6 (43.1 overs)

Bangladesh won by 4 wickets
Uyanwatte Stadium, Matara

15 December
Scorecard

Singapore; 78 (25.1 overs)	v	Pakistan; 80/1 (8.3 overs)

Pakistan won by 9 wickets
Galle International Stadium, Galle

16 December
Scorecard

Afghanistan; 273/3 (50 overs)	v	Pakistan; 252 (49.1 overs)

Afghanistan won by 21 runs
Uyanwatte Stadium, Matara

16 December
Scorecard

Singapore; 70 (25.5 overs)	v	Bangladesh; 71/3 (5.0 overs)

Bangladesh won by 7 wickets
Galle International Stadium, Galle

18 December
Scorecard

Singapore; 73 (18.2 overs)	v	Afghanistan; 75/1 (4.1 overs)

Afghanistan won by 9 wickets
Surrey Village Cricket Ground, Maggona

18 December
Scorecard

Bangladesh; 230 (49.5 overs)	v	Pakistan; 233/9 (49.1 overs)

Pakistan won by 1 wicket
Galle International Stadium, Galle

== Finals ==
=== Semi-finals ===
20 December
Scorecard

India; 294 (49.1 overs)	v	Afghanistan; 217/7 (50 overs)

India won by 77 runs
R. Premadasa Stadium, Colombo

21 December
Scorecard

Bangladesh; 194 (49.1 overs)	v	Sri Lanka; 106/2 (27.1 overs)

Sri Lanka won by 26 runs (D/L)
R. Premadasa Stadium, Colombo

=== Final ===
23 December
Scorecard

India; 273/8 (50 overs)	v	Sri Lanka; 239 (48.4 overs)

India won by 34 runs
R. Premadasa Stadium, Colombo

== Statistics ==
=== Most runs ===
The top five runscorers are included in this table, ranked by runs scored and then by batting average.

Player	Team	Runs	Inns	Avg	Highest	100s	50s
Himanshu Rana	India	283	5	56.60	130	1	2
Shubman Gill	India	252	5	50.40	78	0	3
Vishva Chathuranga	Sri Lanka	193	5	48.25	68*	0	2
Prithvi Shaw	India	191	5	38.20	89	0	1
Saif Hassan	Bangladesh	158	4	39.50	67	0	1

Source: ESPNcricinfo

=== Most wickets ===
The top five wicket takers are listed in this table, ranked by wickets taken and then by bowling average.

Player	Team	Overs	Wkts	Ave	Econ	SR	BBI
Rahul Chahar	India	31.0	10	8.30	2.67	18.6	5/27
Praveen Jayawickrama	Sri Lanka	36.3	10	14.20	3.89	21.9	4/25
Mujeeb Zadran	Afghanistan	35.0	9	15.22	3.91	23.3	4/13
Yash Thakur	India	38.4	9	19.44	4.52	25.7	3/38
Naveen-ul-Haq	Afghanistan	32.2	9	20.88	5.81	21.5	5/80

Source: ESPNcricinfo
