= United Arab Emirates national under-19 cricket team =

United Arab Emirates

Personnel
- Captain: Alishan Sharafu
- Coach: Mudassar Nazar

International Cricket Council
- ICC status: Associate member (1990; 36 years ago)
- ICC region: Asia
- As of 1 November 2015

The United Arab Emirates national under-19 cricket team represent the country of United Arab Emirates in under-19 international cricket.

The UAE has qualified for the Under-19 Cricket World Cup on three occasions – 2014 (as host), 2020 and 2022. Additionally, the team has regularly qualified for the Under-19 Asia Cup as one of the leading ICC associate members in Asia.

== History ==
The UAE became an affiliate member of the International Cricket Council (ICC) in 1989 and an associate member the following year.

The UAE qualified for the 2014 ICC Under-19 Cricket World Cup as hosts, which was also the first time it had hosted a global cricket event.

In April 2019, the team won the Asia Division 1 tournament to qualify for the 2020 Under-19 Cricket World Cup for the second time. The team coach for the 2020 Under-19 Cricket World Cup was South African Dominic Telo, assisted by UAE senior team captain Ahmed Raza. In the tournament warm-up matches, UAE caused a stir by registering an upset victory over New Zealand, chased down the Kiwis' 217–9 with three balls remaining. ayaan misbah is a player Former Pakistan international Mudassar Nazar served as national under-19 coach for the 2021 ACC Under-19 Asia Cup and the 2022 Under-19 Cricket World Cup.

At the 2022 World Cup, the UAE recorded an upset victory against the hosts West Indies, winning by 82 runs in the 9th-place play-off semi-final.

== Under-19 World Cup record ==
United Arab Emirates U19 World Cup record
Year	Result	Pos	№	Pld	W	L	T	NR
(Australia) 1988	Did not enter							
(South Africa) 1998	Did not participate							
(Sri Lanka) 2000	Did not participate							
(New Zealand) 2002	Did not participate							
(Bangladesh) 2004	Did not participate							
(Sri Lanka) 2006	Did not participate							
(Malaysia) 2008	Did not participate							
(New Zealand) 2010	Did not participate							
(Australia) 2012	Did not participate							
(United Arab Emirates) 2014	First round	12th	16	6	1	5	0	0
(Bangladesh) 2016	Did not participate							
(New Zealand) 2018	Did not participate							
(South Africa) 2020	First round	14th	16	6	2	4	0	0
(Cricket West Indies) 2022	First round	9th	16	6	4	2	0	0
(South Africa) 2024	Did not participate							
Total	First round			18	7	11	0	0

== Under-19 Asia Cup record ==
United Arab Emirates U19 Asia Cup record
Year	Result	Pos	№	Pld	W	L	T	NR
(Bangladesh) 1989	Did not participate							
(Pakistan) 2003	Did not participate							
(Malaysia) 2012	Did not participate							
(United Arab Emirates) 2013/14	Group stage	7th	8	3	0	3	0	0
(Sri Lanka) 2016	Did not participate							
(Malaysia) 2017	Group stage	8th	8	3	0	3	0	0
(Bangladesh) 2018	Group stage	7th	8	3	0	3	0	0
(Sri Lanka) 2019	Group stage	7th	8	3	0	3	0	0
(United Arab Emirates) 2021	Group stage	8th	8	3	0	3	0	0
(United Arab Emirates) 2023	Runners up	2nd	8	5	3	2	0	0
(United Arab Emirates) 2025	TBD							
Total	Runners up			20	3	17	0	0

== Records ==
All records listed are for under-19 One Day International (ODI) matches only.

=== Team records ===
Highest totals

- 284/7 (50 overs), v. Canada, at Basseterre, 15 January 2022
- 249 (49 overs), v. Scotland, at Potchefstroom, 28 January 2020
- 232/2 (38.4 overs), v. Canada, at Bloemfontein, 18 January 2020
- 224/9 (50 overs), v. West Indies, at Port-of-Spain, 28 January 2022
- 205 (47.5 overs), v. Sri Lanka, at Sharjah, 18 February 2014

Lowest totals

- 102 (33 overs), v. England, at Abu Dhabi, 14 February 2014
- 105 (32.4 overs), v. Afghanistan, at Abu Dhabi, 22 January 2020
- 121/9 (50 overs), v. Zimbabwe, at Dubai, 27 February 2014
- 140 (49.2 overs), v. New Zealand, at Abu Dhabi, 25 February 2014
- 148 (48.1 overs), v. Bangladesh, at Basseterre, 22 January 2022

=== Individual records ===
Most career runs

- 240 – Alishan Sharafu (2020–2022)
- 197 – Jonathan Figy (2020)
- 175 – Punya Mehra (2022)
- 173 – Vriitya Aravind (2020)
- 150 – Ali Naseer (2020–2022)

Highest individual scores

- 102* (101 balls) – Jonathan Figy, v. Canada, at Bloemfontein, 18 January 2020
- 93 (121 balls) – Aayan Afzal Khan, v. West Indies, at Port-of-Spain, 29 January 2022
- 81 (68 balls) – Osama Hassan, v. Scotland, at Potchefstroom, 28 January 2020
- 73 (50 balls) – Ali Naseer, v. Canada, at Basseterre, 15 January 2022
- 72 (78 balls) – Punya Mehra, v. Canada, at Basseterre, 15 January 2022

Most career wickets

- 12 – Aryan Lakra (2020)
- 10 – Pankaj Prakash (2014), Jash Giyanani (2022)
- 8 – Moaaz Qazi (2014), Adhitya Shetty (2022), Dhruv Parashar (2022)

Best bowling performances

- 4/24 (10 overs) – Omer Mohammed, v. Scotland, at Abu Dhabi, 23 February 2014
- 4/29 (10 overs) – Adhitya Shetty, v. Uganda, at Port-of-Spain, 25 January 2022
- 4/30 (9 overs) – Dhruv Parashar, v. West Indies, at Port-of-Spain, 29 January 2022
- 4/35 (10 overs) – Rishabh Mukherjee, v. Nigeria, at Potchefstroom, 30 January 2020
- 3/20 (10 overs) – Aryan Lakra, v. Nigeria, at Potchefstroom, 30 January 2020
