= Ashiqur Rahman (cricketer, born 1983) =

Bangladeshi cricketer (born 1983)

Ashikur Rahman
Personal information
- Born: 24 October 1983 (age 43); Comilla, Chittagong, Bangladesh
- Nickname: Lovin
- Role: bowler

Domestic team information
- Years: Team
- Dhaka Metropolis
- Chittagong Division
- Sylhet Division

Career statistics
Competition	FC	LA
Matches	15	18
Runs scored	120	15
Batting average	15.00	2.50
100s/50s	0/0	0/0
Top score	27*	7*
Balls bowled	2100	867
Wickets	36	21
Bowling average	25.41	27.33
5 wickets in innings	1	0
10 wickets in match	0	n/a
Best bowling	6/46	3/20
Catches/stumpings	6/-	5/-
- Source: ESPNcricinfo, 23 June 2020

Mohammad Ashiqur Rahman Majumder (Bengali: মোহাম্মদ আশিকুর রহমান মজুমদার; born 24 October 1983) is a former Bangladeshi cricketer and coach who has featured in 15 first-class matches and 18 List A matches. He is currently serving as the BCB Development coach.

== Career ==
Ashikur Rahman represented Bangladesh U-19 cricket team in the youth level and was selected in the Bangladeshi squad for the 2002 Under-19 Cricket World Cup which was captained by Nafees Iqbal. He played a pivotal role in Bangladesh's stunning group stage match victory over India chasing a low total of 78 runs during the World Cup taking 3 crucial wickets and also faced 26 balls without scoring.

He played first-class and List A matches for Dhaka Metropolis, Chittagong Division and Sylhet Division from 2001 to 2008 in a career spanning for six years and never received a call up to play for the national team.

He retired from playing professional cricket and became a coach of Bangladesh Cricket Development. He also had a short stint as the assistant coach of the Bangladesh women's national cricket team. He is currently serving as a development coach of Prime Bank Cricket Club which is owned by the Prime Bank Limited in the Dhaka Premier League.

On 12 May 2020, he was reportedly tested positive for COVID-19 after being admitted to the Mugda hospital in Dhaka after developing symptoms including chest pain.
