= Dominic Telo =

South African cricketer

Dom Telo
Personal information
- Full name: Filipe Dominic Telo
- Born: 4 March 1986 (age 40); Cape Town, South Africa
- Batting: Right-handed
- Bowling: Right-arm medium

Domestic team information
- Years: Team
- 2005/06–2010/11: Western Province
- 2005/06–2007/08: Cape Cobras
- 2008–2009: Derbyshire

Career statistics
Competition	FC	LA	T20
Matches	37	35	16
Runs scored	1798	626	256
Batting average	30.47	26.36	19.69
100s/50s	4/7	0/4	0/0
Top score	134*	90	48
Balls bowled	47	–	0
Wickets	1	–	0
Bowling average	48.00	–	–
5 wickets in innings	0	–	–
10 wickets in match	0	–	–
Best bowling	1/36	–	–
Catches/stumpings	8/0	3/0	4/0
- Source: Cricinfo.com, 27 July 2009

Filipe Dominic Telo (born 4 March 1986) is a South African cricketer.

He signed with English county Derbyshire, on a two-year deal from the start of the 2008 summer. In August 2009 he was informed that his contract would not be renewed.

Telo is the coach of the United Arab Emirates at the 2020 Under-19 Cricket World Cup in his home country of South Africa.
