= List of cricket grounds in Singapore =

This is a list of cricket grounds in Singapore. The grounds included in this list have held List-A matches, all of which have come in the form of One Day Internationals.

Official name (known as)	City or town	Capacity	Ends/notes	Ref
Kallang Ground	Kallang		• National Stadium End • Pavilion End (has held neutral One Day Internationals)	
Singapore Cricket Club Ground	Singapore		• Supreme Court and Parliament House End • Pavilion End (has hosted neutral One Day Internationals)	
New Singapore National Stadium	Kallang	52,000	Proposed venue	
HMS Terror Barracks	Sembawang			
Ceylon Sports Club	Singapore			
Indian Association Ground	Singapore			
Police Academy Ground	Singapore			
Seletar Air Force Base	Singapore			
Tanglin Barracks Ground	Singapore			
University of Wisconsin	Singapore			
