= Japan national under-19 cricket team =

Cricket team

Japan Under-19

Personnel
- Captain: Nikhil Pol
- Coach: Reo Sakurano-Thomas
- Owner: Japan Cricket Association

Team information
- Colors: Blue & Pink

The Japan Under-19 cricket team represents Japan in under-19 cricket at the international level. Outside of the ICC full-member nations, under-19 international cricket is generally limited to tournament play, and outside of global events (run by the International Cricket Council), Japan’s involvement has been relatively limited, only dating back to 2007, where they participated in the East Asia-Pacific Regional Under-19 qualifier for the first time.

They qualified for their maiden Under-19 Cricket World Cup in 2020 after winning the EAP Qualifier Division One. The team has qualified for the 2026 edition.

== History ==
The 2007 East Asia-Pacific Regional Qualifier was Japan’s first involvement in an ICC event at Under-19 level, having become an associate member nation in 2005. This tournament, hosted in Vanuatu, was a qualifier for the 2008 Under 19 World Cup – 31 nations took part in the qualifying tournaments, 5 of which would eventually continue to the tournament proper in Malaysia. Japan lost by 10 wickets after being dismissed for 37 by Papua New Guinea in the opening game of the tournament, by 347 runs to Vanuatu, and then by 387 runs to Fiji. Japan lost the 3rd place playoff by 10 wickets to Fiji, finishing last.

The 2009 edition of the tournament expanded to five teams and did not provide direct qualification to the subsequent Under-19 World Cup. Instead, it provided qualification for the top two finishers to the 2009 Under-19 World Cup Qualifier in Canada, which was a pathway to the 2010 Under-19 World Cup, hosted in New Zealand. Japan did not win a game in this tournament, although spinner Raheel Kano was named in the team of the tournament. The 2011 tournament, hosted on Australia’s Sunshine Coast, was notable for Japan’s only victory to date, defeating Fiji by 24 runs.

Japan did not participate in the East Asia-Pacific regional qualifying tournament again until 2019, participating as hosts, with games held at the Sano International Cricket Ground, also the headquarters of the Japan Cricket Association. Japan defeated Samoa by 174 runs in their first game with Kazumasa Takahashi scoring 68 (92) and taking 4/14. In their second game, a 70 run victory over Vanuatu, captain Marcus Thurgate top scored with 58 (82) and 14-year old legspinner Masato Morita taking 4/38. Their final group game was a 4 wicket win over Fiji, with 15-year old offspinner Yugandar Rethrekar taking 5/18. The final of the tournament was scheduled against 5-time winners Papua New Guinea, before PNG unexpectedly forfeited after 11 players were suspended after a shoplifting incident in Japan, resulting in Japan’s first qualification for a global ICC event.

=== 2020 Under 19 Cricket World Cup ===
Japan’s first World Cup in any form of the game started with a game against New Zealand in Potchefstroom which was washed out after New Zealand scored 195/2 off 28.5 overs. They were comprehensively beaten by India in their second game in Bloemfountein, being dismissed for 41 before India chased down the target with 45.1 overs remaining. Their final group game against Sri Lanka in Potchefstroom was similar to the second, being dismissed for 43 and conceding the target within 9 overs. Japan lost their playoff quarter-final against England at Potchefstroom by 9 wickets. Japan in their 13th place playoff semi-final against Canada at Ibbies Oval, were dismissed for 118 in pursuit of Canada’s 300/7. Neel Date scored a tournament-high 59 (75) in this game, with eight 4s. Their final game came in the 15th place playoff against Nigeria at Potchefstroom, where they lost by 8 wickets defending 115.

== Players ==
=== Current squad ===
The Japanese squad selected for the 2026 U-19 World Cup was announced on December 10, 2025.

Name	Age	Batting style	Bowling style	Club	Notes
Kazuma Kato-Stafford	26 February 2007 (age 19)	Left-hand bat	Left-arm medium	(Japan) Akishima Aviators	Captain
Charlie Hara-Hinze	30 September 2008 (age 18)	Left-hand bat	Slow left-arm orthodox	(Australia) Northern Suburbs	
Gabriel Hara-Hinze	16 December 2009 (age 16)	Right-hand bat	Right-arm medium	(Australia) Northern Suburbs	
Montgomery Hara-Hinze	16 December 2009 (age 16)	Right-hand bat	Right-arm medium	(Australia) Northern Suburbs	
Kaisei Kobayashi-Doggett	3 January 2009 (age 17)	Right-hand bat		(Australia) Randwick-Petersham	
Timothy Moore	12 July 2008 (age 18)	Right-hand bat	Right-arm medium	(Japan) Chiba Sharks	
Skyler Nakayama-Cook	14 November 2009 (age 16)	Right-hand bat		(England) Streatham	Wicketkeeper
Ryuki Ozeki	3 August 2007 (age 19)	Right-hand bat	Right-arm medium	(Japan) Sano Braves	
Nihar Parmar	10 December 2007 (age 18)	Right-hand bat	Right-arm medium	(New Zealand) Te Puke Cricket Club	
Nikhil Pol	22 August 2007 (age 19)	Left-hand bat	Right-arm medium	(Japan) Chiba Sharks	Vice-Captain
Chihaya Sekine	25 June 2007 (age 19)	Right-hand bat		(Japan) Sano Braves	Wicketkeeper
Hugo Tani-Kelly	24 December 2008 (age 17)	Right-hand bat	Right-arm offbreak	(Australia) Northern Suburbs	
Sandev Waduge	18 March 2010 (age 16)	Right-hand bat	Left-arm medium	(Japan) Kawasaki Knight Riders	
Kai Wall	5 August 2008 (age 18)	Right-hand bat	Left-arm medium	(Australia) Barron River	
Taylor Waugh	11 October 2009 (age 17)	Right-hand bat		(Australia) Northern Suburbs	

== Records (Youth One Day Internationals) ==
Appearances (minimum 5 games)
Matches	Player
6	Neel Date
6	Kento Ota-Dobell
6	Shu Noguchi
6	Debashish Sahoo
6	Kazumasa Takahashi
6	Marcus Thurgate
5	Maximilian Clements
5	Sora Ichiki
5	Yugandhar Retharekar

Batting (minimum 25 runs)
Runs	Average	High score	Matches	Player
200	200.00	101*	4	Hugo Tani-Kelly
133	44.33	53*	4	Nihar Parmar
81	27.00	57	4	Charles Hara-Hinze
66	22.00	47	4	Taylor Waugh

Bowling
Wickets	Average	BBI	Matches	Player
5	31.80	4/30	4	Nihar Parmar
5	14.60	3/43	2	Timothy Moore
4	45.00	2/14	4	Nikhil Pol
4	38.00	3/23	4	Charles Hara-Hinze
3	60.66	2/42	4	Kazuma Kato-Stafford
3	61.00	2/52	6	Kento Dobell
2	37.50	2/64	2	Leon Mehlig

== Grounds ==
The Sano International Cricket Ground is the only international standard ground in Japan, serving as the headquarters of the Japan Cricket Association. The redevelopment of a turf wicket square in 2016 for the ICC Women’s World T20 Qualifier was funded partially by investment from ICC East Asia-Pacific member federations, Cricket Australia and New Zealand Cricket, and also included a three-lane net facility. One of the playing conditions for higher levels of cricket as recognised by the ICC are natural turf surfaces, which are not readily available in non-cricket playing countries owing to the specialised nature of the infrastructure involved. As such, the development of a turf block in Sano serves as a stepping stone to the hosting of further international cricket in Japan.

=== ICC U19 Cricket World Cup ===
Japan's U19 World Cup Record
Year	Result	Pos	№	Pld	W	L	T	NR
(Australia) 1988	Did not qualify							
(South Africa) 1998	Did not qualify							
(Sri Lanka) 2000	Did not qualify							
(New Zealand) 2002	Did not qualify							
(Bangladesh) 2004	Did not qualify							
(Sri Lanka) 2006	Did not qualify							
(Malaysia) 2008	Did not qualify							
(New Zealand) 2010	Did not qualify							
(Australia) 2012	Did not qualify							
(United Arab Emirates) 2014	Did not qualify							
(Bangladesh) 2016	Did not qualify							
(New Zealand) 2018	Did not qualify							
(South Africa) 2020	Group stage	16/16	16	3	0	2	0	1
(Cricket West Indies) 2022	Did not qualify							
(South Africa) 2024	Did not qualify							
(Zimbabwe) (Namibia) 2026	Group Stage	14/16	14	4	1	3	0	0
Total	0 Title	0	0	7	1	5	0	1

=== ACC Under-19 Cup ===
Japan’s U19 Asia Cup Record
Year/Host	Result	Pos	№	Pld	W	L	T	NR
(Bangladesh) 1989	Did not qualify							
(Pakistan) 2003	Did not qualify							
(Malaysia) 2012	Did not qualify							
(United Arab Emirates) 2014	Did not qualify							
(Sri Lanka) 2016	Did not qualify							
(Malaysia) 2017	Did not qualify							
(Bangladesh) 2018	Did not qualify							
(Sri Lanka) 2019	Did not qualify							
(United Arab Emirates) 2021	Did not qualify							
(United Arab Emirates) 2023	Group Stage	8th	8	3	0	3	0	0
(United Arab Emirates) 2024	Group Stage	8th	8	3	0	3	0	0
Total	0 Title			6	0	6	0	0
