= 2003 Asia U19 cricket tournament =

Cricket tournament

2003 Asia U19 Cricket tournament
- Dates: 31 October – 6 November 2003
- Administrator: Asian Cricket Council (ACC)
- Cricket format: 50-over
- Tournament format(s): Round-robin, Final
- Host: Pakistan
- Champions: India (2nd title)
- Runners-up: Sri Lanka
- Participants: 4
- Matches: 7
- Most runs: (Sri Lanka) Harsha Vithana (179)
- Most wickets: (India) Irfan Pathan (18)

The 2003 Asia U19 Cricket tournament was the 2nd edition of ACC Under-19 Cup. 4 teams played in that tournament, India became the champions of this edition.

== Group stage ==
=== Points table ===
Pos.	Team	M	W	L	T	NR	Pts.
1	Sri Lanka	3	3	0	0	0	15
2	India	3	2	1	0	0	12
3	Pakistan	3	1	2	0	0	8
4	Bangladesh	3	0	3	0	0	1
Source:- ESPNcricinfo

- Advanced to Final

=== Matches ===
1st match India Under-19s v Sri Lanka Under-19s Gaddafi Stadium, Lahore on 31 October 2003 India Under-19s 194/9 50 over Sri Lanka Under-19s 195/6 41.5 over Sri Lanka Under-19s won by 4 wickets

2nd match Pakistan Under-19s v Bangladesh Under-19s National Stadium, Karachi on 31 October 2003 Pakistan Under-19s 191/5 50 overs Bangladesh Under-19s 174/9 50 over Pakistan Under-19s won by 117 runs

== Final ==
6 November 2003
Scorecard

Sri Lanka; 225 (49.4 overs)	v	India; 229/2 (44.4 overs)
Farveez Maharoof 57 (65); Irfan Pathan 3/33 (9.4 overs)		Robin Uthappa 88 (86); Angelo Mathews 1/30 (6 overs)

India U19 won by 8 wickets
Gaddafi Stadium, Lahore
Umpires: Mohammad Aslam (PAK), Nadir Shah (BAN)

- India U19 won the toss and elected to field.
- India U19 won the Asia Youth Cup for 2nd time.
