= Pakistan national under-19 cricket team =

International competition age limited cricket team

Pakistan
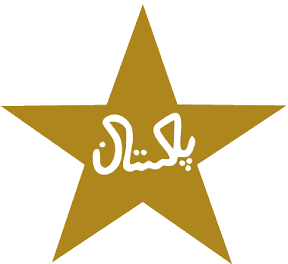
- Pakistan Cricket Crest

Personnel
- Captain: Farhan Yousaf
- Coach: Sarfaraz Ahmed
- Bowling coach: Junaid Khan
- Fielding coach: Mansoor Amjad
- Manager: Shoaib Muhammad

Team information
- Colors: Green
- Founded: 1979; 47 years ago
- Home ground: Gaddafi Stadium, Lahore
- Capacity: 27,000

History
- First-class debut: India in 1979 at Wankhede Stadium, Bombay
- ICC Under-19 Cricket World Cup wins: (gold) 2 (2004, 2006)
- ACC Under-19 Asia Cup wins: (gold) 2 (2012, 2025)

International Cricket Council
- ICC region: Asia
Test kit
ODI kit
T20I kit
- As of 18 December 2023

The Pakistan Under-19 cricket team have twice (2004 and 2006) been Cricket World Champions at the under-19 level. Their second win made them the first, and to date the only, back-to-back champions. They have also been runners-up thrice (1988, 2010 & 2014) and have finished in 3rd place 4 times (2000, 2008, 2018 & 2020). The Pakistan U19 won the 2025 ACC Under-19 Asia Cup in December, defeating India by 191 runs in the final.

== Tournament history ==
=== U-19 World Cup Record ===
Year	Host	Squad	Result
1988	Australia	Squad	Runners-up
1998	South Africa	Squad	2nd Round
2000	Sri Lanka	Squad	3rd place
2002	New Zealand	Squad	8th place
2004	Bangladesh	Squad	Champions
2006	Sri Lanka	Squad	Champions
2008	Malaysia	Squad	3rd place
2010	New Zealand	Squad	Runners-up
2012	Australia	Squad	8th place
2014	UAE	Squad	Runners-up
2016	Bangladesh	Squad	5th place
2018	New Zealand	Squad	3rd place
2020	South Africa	Squad	3rd place
2022	West Indies	Squad	5th place
2024	South Africa	Squad	3rd place
2026	Zimbabwe; Namibia	Squad	6th place

=== U-19 Asia Cup Record ===
Year	Venue	Round
2012	Malaysia	Champions
2014	United Arab Emirates	Runners-up
2016	Sri Lanka	5th Place
2017	Malaysia	Runners-up
2018	Bangladesh	5th Place
2019	Sri Lanka	6th Place
2021	United Arab Emirates	Semi finalists
2023	United Arab Emirates	Semi finalists
2025	United Arab Emirates	Champions

== 2004 ==
Pakistan won the 2004 U/19 Cricket World Cup by defeating the West Indies in the final in Dhaka, Bangladesh. This was Pakistan's first time to be crowned the Under-19 World Cup champions after beating West Indies by 25 runs under the captaincy of Khalid Latif.

== 2006 ==
Pakistan won the 2006 U/19 Cricket World Cup by defeating India in the final in Colombo, Sri Lanka, when they successfully defended a small total of 109 runs by dismissing the Indian batting lineup for 71 runs, becoming the first, and to date the only, team to defend the U-19 World Cup. They were captained by Sarfraz Ahmed.

== Current team ==
Head coach: Mohammad Yousuf

Player	Date of Birth	Batting	Bowling style
Akhtar Shah (c),	10 October 2002 (age 23)	Right	—
Aamir Ali	5 May 2002 (age 24)	Right	Slow left-arm orthodox
Fahad Munir	29 December 2002 (age 23)	Left	Right-arm Legspin
Muhammad Jawad Ahmad	5 April 2005 (age 21)	left	Right-arm leg break
Muhammad Haris	30 March 2001 (age 25)	Right	—
Burhan Shabbir Khan (vc)	7 September 2007 (age 18)	Right	Right-arm Medium-fast
Mehran Mumtaz	1 December 2002 (age 23)	left	left-arm Offbreak
Mohammad Huraira	25 April 2002 (age 24)	Right	—	Saim Ayub	5 February 2002 (age 24)	Right	Right-arm Legspin
Syed Muhammad Aun Abbas	20 February 2005 (age 21)	Right	Right-arm Medium-fast
Saad Baig	25 December 2000 (age 25)	Right	—
Haseebullah Khan	14 August 2004 (age 21)	Right	Right-arm Offspin
Abdul Wahid Bangalzai	4 March 2003 (age 23)	Right	—
Amir Mehmood	11 November 2003 (age 22)	Right	Right-arm leg-spin

== Management and Coaching Staff ==
Name	Position
Shoaib Muhammad	Manager
Mohammad Yousuf	Head coach
Umar Rasheed	Assistant coach
Junaid Khan	Bowling coach
Mansoor Amjad	Fielding coach
Muhammad Masroor	Assistant batting coach
Naeem Ul Rasul	Physio
Usman Hashmi	Analyst
Muhammad Arslan	Media and digital manager

== See also ==
- Pakistan women's under-19 cricket team
- Pakistan men's national cricket team
- Pakistan women's national cricket team
