= Malaysia under-19 cricket team =

Malaysia Under-19s

Personnel
- Captain: M.Rifqi Iman
- Coach: Esrafiq

The Malaysia Under-19 cricket team represents the country of Malaysia in U-19 international cricket.

They qualified for the 2008 Under-19 Cricket World Cup, which they also hosted, and as of date is their only qualification in the Under-19 Cricket World Cup, which is also considered as their biggest success to date and is also considered as the biggest success in Malaysian cricketing history.

Malaysia took part in the 2009 ACC Under-19 Elite Cup, finishing in 5th position. They lost only two matches in the group stages to Hong Kong and Nepal.

== ICC Under-19 World Cup record ==
Malaysia's U19 World Cup record
Year	Result	Pos	№	Pld	W	L	T	NR
(Australia) 1988	Did not enter							
(South Africa) 1998	Did not qualify							
(Sri Lanka) 2000	Did not qualify							
(New Zealand) 2002	Did not qualify							
(Bangladesh) 2004	Did not qualify							
(Sri Lanka) 2006	Did not qualify							
(Malaysia) 2008	First round	16th	16	5	1	4	0	0
(New Zealand) 2010	Did not qualify							
(Australia) 2012	Did not qualify							
(United Arab Emirates) 2014	Did not qualify							
(Bangladesh) 2016	Did not qualify							
(New Zealand) 2018	Did not qualify							
(South Africa) 2020	Did not qualify							
Total				5	1	4	0	0

== Team Officials ==
- Manager - M.F.T Senathiraj - 2015 to present
- Head coach - Thushara Kodikara - 2015
- Head coach - Suresh Navaratnam - 2016
- Head coach - Emdadol Haq - 2017
- Head coach - Suresh Navaratnam - 2017
