= Kuwait national under-19 cricket team =

Kuwait national Under-19 cricket team

Personnel
- Owner: Cricket Kuwait

Team information
- Founded: 2003; 23 years ago
- Official website: www.cricketkuwait.org

The Kuwait national under-19 cricket team represents State of Kuwait in under-19 international cricket. It is organised by the Kuwait Cricket Association (KAC), which is an associate member of International Cricket Council (ICC) has been an associate member of the International Cricket Council (ICC) since 2005, having previously been an affiliate member since 1998.

Kuwait qualified for the 2019 and 2021 ACC Under-19 Asia Cups.
