= Sri Lanka national under-19 cricket team =

Sri Lanka under-19 cricket team
- One Day name: Sri Lanka U19

Personnel
- Captain: Vimath Dinsara
- Owner: Sri Lanka Cricket (SLC)

Team information
- Home ground: Pallekele International Cricket Stadium Galle International Cricket Stadium

History
- List A debut: v. Australia at Adelaide Oval, Adelaide, Australia; 29 February 1984

International Cricket Council
- ICC status: 1988 Associate Member (1965); Full Member (1981)
- ICC region: Asian Cricket Council (ACC)
- Official website: http://www.srilankacricket.lk

The Sri Lanka under-19 cricket team represents Sri Lanka in U-19 international cricket. The team is controlled by Sri Lanka Cricket (SLC).

== Tournament history ==
A red box around the year indicates tournaments played within Sri Lanka.

Key
Champions
Runners-up
Semi-finals

=== U-19 World Cup record ===
Year	Host	Squad	Result
1988	Australia	Squad	Group stage
1998	South Africa	Squad	Super League
2000	Sri Lanka	Squad	Runners-up
2002	New Zealand	Squad	Group stage
2004	Bangladesh	Squad	Super League
2006	Sri Lanka	Squad	Super League play-off semi-finals
2008	Malaysia	Squad	8th place
2010	New Zealand	Squad	Semi-finals (4th place)
2012	Australia	Squad	9th place
2014	United Arab Emirates	Squad	8th place
2016	Bangladesh	Squad	Semi-finals (4th place)
2018	New Zealand	Squad	9th place
2020	South Africa	Squad	10th place
2022	(Cricket West Indies) West Indies	Squad	6th place
2024	South Africa	Squad	9th place
2026	Zimbabwe; Namibia	Squad	5th place

=== U-19 Asia Cup record ===
Year	Venue	Result
1989	Bangladesh	Runner up
2003	Pakistan	Runner up
2012	Malaysia	Semi-finals
2014	United Arab Emirates	Semi-finals
2016	Sri Lanka	Runner up
2017	Malaysia	Group stage
2018	Bangladesh	Runner up
2019	Sri Lanka	Semi-finals
2021	United Arab Emirates	Runner up
2023	United Arab Emirates	Group stage
2024	United Arab Emirates	Semi-finals
2025	United Arab Emirates	Semi-finals

== Current squad ==
Player	Date of birth	Batting	Bowling	Role	Jersey number
Vimath Dinsara	13 September 2006 (aged 19)	Right	-	Batter	21
Kavija Gamage	27 March 2007 (aged 18)	Right	Right-arm offbreak	Batting allrounder	54
Dimantha Mahawithana	25 January 2007 (aged 18)	Right	Right-arm medium	batter	25
Viran Chamuditha	10 April 2008 (aged 17)	Left	Slow left-arm Orthodox	Batting all-rounder	1
Adham Hilmy	27 January 2007 (aged 18)	Right	-	Wicket-keeper	27
Chamika Heenatigala	23 June 2007 (aged 18)	Left	Slow left-arm orthodox	All-rounder
Dulnith Sigera	24 June 2007 (aged 18)	Right	Right-arm medium	Batting all-rounder	59
Sethmika Senevirathne	3 April 2008 (aged 17)	Right	Right-arm medium fast	Bowling all-rounder
Rasith Nimsara	22 November 2007 (aged 18)	Right	Right-arm medium fast	Bowler	19
Vigneshwaran Akash	8 July 2008 (aged 17)	Right	Right-arm legbreak	Bowler	8
Jeevahan Sriram	11 August 2007 (aged 18)	Right	Right-arm medium fast	Bowler
Senuja Wekunugoda	30 July 2008 (aged 17)	Left	-	Batter
Chamarindu Nethsara	26 October 2006 (aged 19)	Right	-	Wicket-keeper
Malintha Silva	5 November 2006 (aged 19)	Right	Right-arm offbreak	Bowler
Kugathas Mathulan	3 May 2007 (aged 18)	Left	Right-Arm medium	Bowler

== See also ==
- Sri Lanka national cricket team
