= Singapore Cricket Association =

Governing body of Singapore

- Sport: Cricket
- Jurisdiction: National
- Affiliation: International Cricket Council (ICC)
- (Singapore)

Singapore Cricket Association is the official governing body of the sport of cricket in Singapore. Its current headquarters is in Stadium Crescent, Singapore. Singapore Cricket Association is Singapore's representative at the International Cricket Council and is an associate member and has been a member of that body since 1974./ It is also a member of the Asian Cricket Council.

== Grounds ==
Kallang Ground and The Padang are two grounds in Singapore that have hosted One Day International matches. List of other grounds is provided in this link.

== See also ==
- Singapore national cricket team
- Singapore Cricket Club
