= 2022 ICC Under-19 Cricket World Cup squads =

List of cricket squads

The 2022 ICC Under-19 Cricket World Cup took place in the West Indies in January and February 2022. South Africa were the first team to name their team, with the following squads selected for the tournament.

== Afghanistan ==
Afghanistan's squad was announced on 4 December 2021.

- Suliman Safi (c)
- Ijaz Ahmadzai (vc)
- Bilal Ahmad
- Noor Ahmad
- Mohammad Ishaq (wk)
- Ijaz Ahmad
- Khalil Ahmad
- Suliman Arabzai
- Abdul Hadi (wk)
- Shahid Hassani
- Faisal Khan
- Nangyalai Khan
- Mohammadullah Najibullah
- Izharulhaq Naveed
- Allah Noor
- Bilal Sami
- Bilal Sayeedi
- Khyber Wali
- Younis
- Naveed Zadran

== Australia ==
Australia's squad was announced on 14 December 2021, with Cooper Connolly named as the captain of the team.

- Cooper Connolly (c)
- Harkirat Bajwa
- Aidan Cahill
- Joshua Garner
- Isaac Higgins
- Campbell Kellaway
- Corey Miller
- Jack Nisbet
- Nivethan Radhakrishnan
- William Salzmann
- Lachlan Shaw
- Jackson Sinfield
- Tobias Snell
- Tom Whitney
- Teague Wyllie

Liam Blackford, Liam Doddrell, Joel Davies, Sam Rahaley and Aubrey Stockdale were all named as reserve players.

== Bangladesh ==
Bangladesh's squad was announced on 7 December 2021.

- Rakibul Hasan (c)
- Prantik Nawrose Nabil (vc)
- Mohammad Fahim
- Musfik Hasan
- Iftikher Hossain
- Ariful Islam
- Mahfijul Islam
- Tahjibul Islam
- Abdullah Al Mamun
- SM Meherob
- Aich Mollah
- Ripon Mondol
- Naimur Rohman
- Tanzim Hasan Sakib
- Ashikur Zaman

Ahosan Habib and Jishan Alam were both named as reserve players, with Mohiuddin Tareq, Tawhidul Islam Ferdus, Shakib Shahriyer and Golam Kibria named as standby players.

== Canada ==
Canada's squad was announced on 8 December 2021.

- Mihir Patel (c)
- Sahil Badin
- Anoop Chima (wk)
- Ethan Gibson
- Parmveer Kharoud
- Siddh Ladd (wk)
- Yasir Mahmood
- Gavin Niblock
- Sheel Patel
- Mohit Prashar
- Harjap Saini
- Jash Shah
- Kairav Sharma
- Gurnek Johal Singh
- Arjuna Sukhu

Ramanvir Dhaliwal, Eran Maliduwapathirana, Yash Mondkar and Ayush Singh were also named as reserve players.

== England ==
England's squad was announced on 22 December 2021. On 16 January 2022, Sonny Baker was ruled out of England's squad due to a back injury, with Ben Cliff named as his replacement.

- Tom Prest (c)
- Jacob Bethell (vc)
- Rehan Ahmed
- Tom Aspinwall
- ~~Sonny Baker~~
- Nathan Barnwell
- George Bell
- Josh Boyden
- Ben Cliff
- James Coles
- Alex Horton
- Will Luxton
- James Rew
- James Sales
- Fateh Singh
- George Thomas

Josh Baker and Ben Cliff were also named as reserve players.

== India ==
India's squad was announced on 19 December 2022 .

- Yash Dhull (c)
- Shaik Rasheed (vc)
- Dinesh Bana (wk)
- Raj Angad Bawa
- Aneeshwar Gautham
- Srujan Shankar
- Rajvardhan Hangargekar
- Vicky Ostwal
- Manav Parakh
- Angkrish Raghuvanshi
- Ravi Kumar
- Garv Sangwan
- Nishant Sindhu
- Harnoor Singh
- Kaushal Tambe
- Vasu Vats
- Aaradya Yadav (wk)
- Siddarth Yadav

Rishith Reddy, Uday Saharan, Ansh Gosai, Amrit Raj Upadhyay and PM Singh Rathore were also named as reserve players.

== Ireland ==
Ireland's squad was announced on 15 December 2021.

- Tim Tector (c)
- Diarmuid Burke
- Joshua Cox
- Jack Dickson
- Liam Doherty
- Jamie Forbes
- Daniel Forkin
- Matthew Humphreys
- Philippe le Roux
- Scott Macbeth
- Nathan McGuire
- Muzamil Sherzad
- David Vincent
- Luke Whelan
- Reuben Wilson

Robbie Millar, Ryan Hunter and Ewan Wilson were also named as reserve players.

== Pakistan ==
Pakistan's squad was announced on 2 December 2021. On 6 January 2022, Abdul Bangalzai was ruled out of the tournament following a positive test for COVID-19 with Abbas Ali named as his replacement.

- Qasim Akram (c)
- Faisal Akram
- Abbas Ali
- Awais Ali
- Ali Asfand
- ~~Abdul Wahid Bangalzai~~
- Abdul Faseeh
- Haseebullah Khan (wk)
- Ahmed Khan
- Rizwan Mehmood Syed
- Mehran Mumtaz
- Arham Nawab
- Muhammad Irfan Khan
- Maaz Sadaqat
- Muhammad Shahzad
- Zeeshan Zameer

Ghazi Ghouri and Mohammad Zeeshan were also named as reserve players.

== Papua New Guinea ==
Papua New Guinea's squad was announced on 22 December 2021.

- Barnabas Maha (c)
- Ryan Ani
- Malcolm Aporo
- Toua Boe
- John Kariko
- Peter Karoho
- Sigo Kelly
- Karoho Kevau
- Rasan Kevau
- Christopher Kilapat
- Junior Morea
- Patrick Nou
- Aue Oru
- Boio Ray
- Katenalaki Singi

Vele Kariko, Gata Mika and Api Ila were also named as reserve players.

== Scotland ==
Scotland's squad was announced on 23 December 2021.

- Charlie Peet (c)
- Jamie Cairns
- Christopher Cole
- Aayush Das Mahapatra
- Oliver Davidson
- Sam Elstone
- Sean Fischer-Keogh
- Gabriel Gallman-Findlay
- Jack Jarvis
- Rafay Khan
- Tomas Mackintosh
- Muhaymen Majeed
- Ruaridh McIntyre
- Lyle Robertson
- Charlie Tear (wk)

H Ali, F Huddleston, J Lambley, M Layton and D Stevenswere also named as reserve players.

== South Africa ==
South Africa's squad was announced on 17 November 2021.

- George Van Heerden (c)
- Liam Alder
- Matthew Boast
- Dewald Brevis
- Mickey Copeland
- Ethan Cunningham
- Valentine Kitime
- Kwena Maphaka
- Gerhard Maree
- Aphiwe Mnyanda
- Andile Simelane
- Jade Smith
- Kaden Solomons
- Joshua Stephenson
- Asakhe Tshaka

Hardus Coetzer, Ronan Hermann and Caleb Seleka were also named as reserve players.

== Sri Lanka ==
Sri Lanka's squad was announced on 2 January 2022.

- Dunith Wellalage (c)
- Raveen de Silva (vc)
- Anjala Bandara
- Shevon Daniel
- Sadeesh Jayawardena
- Abhisheak Liyanaarachchi
- Sakuna Liyanage
- Traveen Mathew
- Pawan Pathiraja
- Matheesha Pathirana
- Sadisha Rajapaksa
- Vinuja Ranpul
- Yasiru Rodrigo
- Wanuja Sahan
- Ranuda Somarathne
- Malsha Tharupathi
- Chamindu Wickramasinghe

== Uganda ==
Uganda's squad was announced on 7 December 2021.

- Pascal Murungi (c)
- Ismail Munir (vc)
- Brian Asaba
- Isaac Ategeka
- Joseph Baguma
- Cyrus Kakuru
- Christopher Kidega
- Ronald Lutaaya
- Juma Miyaji
- Matthew Musinguzi
- Akram Nsubuga
- Edwin Nuwagaba
- Pius Oloka
- Ronald Omara
- Ronald Opio

Fahad Mutagana, Abdallah Muhammad, Raima Musa, Jaffer Ochaya and Yunus Sowobi were also named as reserve players.

== West Indies ==
The West Indies' squad was announced on 3 December 2021.

- Ackeem Auguste (c)
- Giovonte Depeiza (vc)
- Onaje Amory
- Teddy Bishop
- Carlon Bowen-Tuckett
- Jaden Carmichael
- McKenny Clarke
- Rivaldo Clarke
- Jordan Johnson
- Johann Layne
- Anderson Mahase
- Matthew Nandu
- Shaqkere Parris
- Shiva Sankar
- Isai Thorne

Anderson Amurdan, Nathan Edward, Andel Gordon, Vasant Singh and Kevin Wickham were also named as reserve players.

== United Arab Emirates ==
The United Arab Emirates' squad was announced on 4 January 2022.

- Alishan Sharafu (c)
- Shival Bawa
- Jash Giyanani
- Sailles Jaishankar
- Nilansh Keswani
- Aayan Afzal Khan
- Punya Mehra
- Ali Naseer
- Ronak Panoly
- Dhruv Parashar
- Vinayak Vijaya Raghavan
- Soorya Sathish
- Aryansh Sharma
- Adithya Shetty
- Kai Smith

Hassan Khalid, Annant Bhargava, Muhammad Zuhaib and Hamad Mohammed Arshad were also named as reserve players.

== Zimbabwe ==
Zimbabwe's squad was announced on 28 December 2021.

- Emmanuel Bawa (c)
- Brian Bennett (c)
- David Bennett
- Victor Chirwa
- Mgcini Dube
- Alex Falao
- Tendekai Mataranyika
- Tashinga Makoni
- Connor Mitchell
- Steven Saul
- Matthew Schonken
- Panashe Taruvinga
- Matthew Welch
- Rogan Wolhuter
- Ngenyasha Zvinoera

Aisha Chibanda, Tanaka Zvaita, Luyanda Mtomba, Tadiwanashe Mwale and Declan Rugg were also named as reserve players.
