= 2021 ACC Under-19 Asia Cup =

Cricket tournament

2021 Under-19 Asia Cup
- 2021 ACC Under-19 Asia Cup Logo
- Dates: 23 December 2021 – 31 December 2021
- Administrator: Asian Cricket Council (ACC)
- Cricket format: 50-over
- Tournament format(s): Round-robin, playoffs
- Host: United Arab Emirates
- Champions: India (8th title)
- Runners-up: Sri Lanka
- Participants: 8
- Matches: 15
- Player of the series: (India) Harnoor Singh
- Most runs: (India) Shaik Rasheed (133)
- Most wickets: (Pakistan) Zeeshan Zameer (11)

The 2021 Under-19 Asia Cup was the 9th edition of ACC Under-19 Cup. The cricket tournament was played in United Arab Emirates from 23 to 31 December 2021. Eight teams contested in the tournament, including five full members and three qualified members.

== Teams ==
No.	Teams	Qualification method
1	India	ICC Full Member
2	Pakistan	ICC Full Member
3	Bangladesh	ICC Full Member
4	Sri Lanka	ICC Full Member
5	Afghanistan	ICC Full Member
6	Kuwait	Qualifiers
7	Nepal	Qualifiers
8	United Arab Emirates	Qualifiers

== Squads ==
Afghanistan	Bangladesh	India	Kuwait	Nepal	Pakistan	Sri Lanka	United Arab Emirates
Suliman Safi (c); Ijaz Ahmadzai; Mohammad Ishaq; Suliman Arabzai; Bilal Sayeedi; Allah Noor; Muhammadullah; Khyber Wali; Ijaz Ahmad; Izharulhaq Naweed; Noor Ahmad; Faisal Khan; Naveed Zadran; Bilal Sami; Nangeyalia Kharote; Khalil Ahmad; Abdul Hadi; Bilal Tarin; Shahid Hassani; Younis	Rakibul Hasan (c); Prantik Nawrose Nabil; Mahfijul Islam; Iftakhar Hossain Ifti; SM Meherob Hasan; Aich Mollah; Abdulla Al Mamun; Gazi Mohammad; Tahjibul Islam; Ariful Islam; Md Fahim; Musfik Hasan; Ripon Mondol; Ashiqur Zaman; Tanzim Hasan Sakib; Naimur Rahman Noyon	Yash Dhull (c); Harnoor Singh Pannu; Angkrish Raghuvanshi; Ansh Gosai; Shaik Rasheed; Anneshwar Gautam; Siddharth Yadav; Kaushal Tambe; Nishant Sindhu; Dinnesh Bana; Aaradhya Yadav; Raj Angad Bawa; Rajvardhan Hangargekar; Garv Sangwan; Ravi Kumar; Rishith Reddy; Manav Parakh; Amrit Raj Upadhyay; Vicky Ostwal	Meet Bhavsar (c & wk); M Umar; Abdul Sadiq; Aamir Ali; Abdullah Zaheer; Talha Hassan; Mohamed Raashiq; Mohamad Thoufiq; Ethan Cheran; Abdullah Farooq; Mirza Ahmed; Jude Saldanha; Zeeshan Azeem; Mohammad Bastaki; Henry Thomas; Habier Ali	Dev Khanal (c); Bibek Yadav; Santosh Karki; Arjun Kumal; Prakash Jaisi; Sher Malla; Gulshan Jha; Aadil Alam; Basir Ahamad; Arjun Saud; Dipesh Kandel; Bibek Rana Magar; Tilak Raj Bhandari; Durgesh Gupta; Basant Karki	Qasim Akram (c); Abdul Faseeh; Abdul Wahid Bangalzai; Ahmed Khan; Ali Asfand; Arham Nawab; Awais Ali; Faisal Akram; Haseebullah Khan; Irfan Khan Niazi; Maaz Sadaqat; Mehran Mumtaz; Mohammad Shehzad; Rizwan Mehmood; Syed Zeeshan Zameer	Dunith Wellalage (c); Chamindu Wickramasinghe; Shevon Daniel; Sadisha Rajapaksa; Pawan Pathiraja; Wanuja Sahan; Anjala Bandara; Malsha Tharupathi; Sadeesh Jayawardena; Yasiru Rodrigo; Raveen de Silva; Matheesha Pathirana; Traveen Mathew; Ranuda Somarathne; Abishek Liyanarachchi; Vinuja Ranpul; Sakuna Liyanage	Alishan Sharafu (c); Kai Smith; Dhruv Parashar; Punya Mehra; Ronak Panoly; Ali Aamer Naseer; Adithya Shetty; Soorya Sathish; Sailles Jaishankar; Vinayak Vijaya Raghavan; Aayan Afzal Khan; Aryansh Sharma; Jash Giyanani; Shival Bawa; Nilansh Keswani

== Group stage ==
=== Group A ===
Pos	Team	Pld	W	L	T	NR	Pts	NRR	Qualification
1	Pakistan	3	3	0	0	0	6	1.142	Advanced to Semi-finals
2	India	3	2	1	0	0	4	1.085	Advanced to Semi-finals
3	Afghanistan	3	1	2	0	0	2	0.158	
4	United Arab Emirates (H)	3	0	3	0	0	0	−2.100	

Source: Cricinfo
(H) Host

23 December 2021
9:30
Scorecard

India; 282/5 (50 overs)	v	United Arab Emirates; 128 (34.3 overs)
Harnoor Singh 120 (130); Alishan Sharafu 2/44 (5 overs)		Kai Smith 45 (70); Rajvardhan Hangargekar 3/24 (9 overs)

India U-19 won by 154 runs
ICC Academy Oval-1, Dubai
Umpires: Hemantha Boteju (SL) and Tanvir Ahmed (Ban)
Player of the match: Harnoor Singh (IND)

- United Arab Emirates U-19 won the toss and elected to field.

23 December 2021
9:30
Scorecard

Afghanistan; 52 (23.1 overs)	v	Pakistan; 53/6 (16.4 overs)
Nangeyalia Kharote 15 (27); Ahmed Khan 3/21 (6 overs)		Maaz Sadaqat 14* (46); Noor Ahmad 3/20 (5 overs)

Pakistan U-19 won by 4 wickets
ICC Academy Oval-2, Dubai
Umpires: K. N. Ananthapadmanabhan (Ind) and Shiju Sam (UAE)
Player of the match: Awais Ali (PAK)

- Afghanistan U-19 won the toss and elected to bat.

25 December 2021
9:30
Scorecard

India; 237 (49 overs)	v	Pakistan; 240/8 (50 overs)
Aaradhya Yadav 50 (83); Zeeshan Zameer 5/60 (10 overs)		Muhammad Shahzad 81 (105); Raj Bawa 4/56 (10 overs)

Pakistan U-19 won by 2 wickets
ICC Academy Oval-2, Dubai
Umpires: Hemantha Boteju (SL) and Tanvir Ahmed (Ban)
Player of the match: Muhammad Shahzad (PAK)

- Pakistan U-19 won the toss and elected to field.

25 December 2021
9:30
Scorecard

Afghanistan; 194/9 (50 overs)	v	United Arab Emirates; 54 (14.4 overs)
Allah Noor 97* (129); Nilansh Keswani 3/24 (10 overs)		Nilansh Keswani 15 (15); Bilal Sami 3/12 (5 overs)

Afghanistan U-19 won by 140 runs
ICC Academy Oval-1, Dubai
Umpires: Naresh D'Souza (UAE) and Sarika Prasad (Sin)

- United Arab Emirates U-19 won the toss and elected to field.
- Pakistan U-19 qualified for Semi-final as a result of this match.

27 December 2021
9:30
Scorecard

Afghanistan; 259/4 (50 overs)	v	India; 262/6 (48.2 overs)
Ijaz Ahmadzai 86* (68); Kaushal Tambe 1/25 (8 overs)		Harnoor Singh 65 (74); Noor Ahmad 4/43 (10 overs)

India U-19 won by 4 wickets
ICC Academy Oval-2, Dubai
Umpires: Sarika Prasad (Sin) and Shiju Sam (UAE)

- India U-19 won the toss and elected to field.
- India U-19 qualified for Semi-finals as result of this match.

27 December 2021
9:30
Scorecard

Pakistan; 219/8 (50 overs)	v	United Arab Emirates; 198/9 (50 overs)
Qasim Akram 50 (67); Aayan Afzal Khan 3/44 (10 overs)		Aayan Afzal Khan 38 (32); Qasim Akram 3/52 (9 overs)

Pakistan U-19 won by 21 runs
ICC Academy Oval-1, Dubai
Umpires: K. N. Ananthapadmanabhan (Ind) and Naresh D'Souza (UAE)

- Pakistan U-19 won the toss and elected to bat.

=== Group B ===
Pos	Team	Pld	W	L	T	NR	Pts	NRR	Qualification
1	Bangladesh	3	2	0	0	1	5	3.810	Advanced to Semi-finals
2	Sri Lanka	3	2	0	0	1	5	3.340	Advanced to Semi-finals
3	Kuwait	3	1	2	0	0	2	−3.308	
4	Nepal	3	0	3	0	0	0	−1.485	

Source: Cricinfo

23 December 2021
9:30
Scorecard

Sri Lanka; 323/5 (50 overs)	v	Kuwait; 49 (17.3 overs)
Pawan Pathiraja 86 (72); Zeeshan Azeem 2/49 (6 overs)		Meet Bhavsar 25 (24); Dunith Wellalage 4/2 (1.3 overs)

Sri Lanka U-19 won by 274 runs
Sharjah Cricket Stadium, Sharjah
Umpires: Ahmed Shah Pakteen (Afg) and Waleed Yaqub (Pak)
Player of the match: Pawan Pathiraja (SL)

- Sri Lanka U-19 won the toss and elected to bat.

24 December 2021
9:30
Scorecard

Bangladesh; 297/4 (50 overs)	v	Nepal; 143 (42.3 overs)
Prantik Nawrose Nabil 127* (112); Tilak Bhandari 1/31 (6 overs)		Gulsan Jha 35 (28); SM Meherob 2/20 (9 overs)

Bangladesh U-19 won by 154 runs
Sharjah Cricket Stadium, Sharjah
Umpires: Akbar Ali (UAE) and Iftikhar Ali (UAE)
Player of the match: Prantik Nawrose Nabil (BAN)

- Bangladesh U-19 won the toss and elected
to bat.

25 December 2021
9:30
Scorecard

Bangladesh; 291 (49.2 overs)	v	Kuwait; 69 (25.3 overs)
Mahfijul Islam 112 (119); Abdul Sadiq 3/40 (8.2 overs)		Meet Bhavsar 43 (77); Ripon Mondol 3/10 (8 overs)

Bangladesh U-19 won by 222 runs
Sharjah Cricket Stadium, Sharjah
Umpires: Ahmed Shah Pakteen (Afg) and Waleed Yaqub (Pak)
Player of the match: Mahfijul Islam (BAN)

- Kuwait U-19 won the toss and elected to field.

26 December 2021
9:30
Scorecard

Sri Lanka; 322/4 (50 overs)	v	Nepal; 262 (47.5 overs)
Sadisha Rajapaksa 131 (119); Mohammad Aadil Alam 2/46 (9 overs)		Arjun Saud 64 (80); Raveen de Silva 3/35 (7 overs)

Sri Lanka U-19 won by 60 runs
Sharjah Cricket Stadium, Sharjah
Umpires: Akbar Ali (UAE) and Iftikhar Ali (UAE)

- Sri Lanka U-19 won the toss and elected to bat.
- Bangladesh U-19 and Sri Lanka U-19 qualified for semi finals as a result of this match.

28 December 2021
9:30
Scorecard

Bangladesh; 130/4 (32.4 overs)	v	Sri Lanka
Md Prantik Nawrose 45 (64); Traveen Mathew 2/17 (6 overs)

Match abandoned due to COVID-19
Sharjah Cricket Stadium, Sharjah
Umpires: Ahmed Shah Pakteen (Afg) and Akbar Ali (UAE)

- Sri Lanka U-19 won the toss and elected to field.

28 December 2021
9:30
Scorecard

Nepal; 239 (42.3 overs)	v	Kuwait; 241/9 (48.5 overs)
Basir Ahamad 56 (61); Mirza Ahmed 3/22 (5 overs)		Meet Bhavsar 175* (149); Gulshan Jha 3/70 (10 overs)

Kuwait U-19 won by 1 wicket
ICC Academy Oval-2, Dubai
Umpires: Iftikhar Ali (UAE) and Shiju Sam (UAE)

- Kuwait U-19 won the toss and elected to field.

== Knockout stage ==
=== Bracket ===
Semi-finals
A1	Pakistan	125
B2	Sri Lanka	147
B1	Bangladesh	140
A2	India	243/8

Final
B2	Sri Lanka	106/9
A2	India	104/1

=== Semi-finals ===
30 December 2021
9:30
Scorecard

Sri Lanka; 147 (44.5 overs)	v	Pakistan; 125 (49.3 overs)
Matheesha Pathirana 31 (33); Zeeshan Zameer 4/32 (10 overs)		Ahmad Khan 36 (74); Traveen Mathew 4/14 (10 overs)

Sri Lanka U-19 won by 22 runs
ICC Academy Oval-1, Dubai
Umpires: Tanvir Ahmed (Ban) and Sarika Prasad (Sin)
Player of the match: Traveen Mathew (SL)

- Sri Lanka U-19 won the toss and elected to bat.

30 December 2021
9:30
Scorecard

India; 243/8 (50 overs)	v	Bangladesh; 140 (38.2 overs)
Shaik Rasheed 90 (108); Rakibul Hassan 3/41 (10 overs)		Ariful Islam 42 (77); Ravi Kumar 2/22 (5 overs)

India U-19 won by 103 runs
Sharjah Cricket Stadium, Sharjah
Umpires: Hemantha Boteju (SL) and Shiju Sam (UAE)
Player of the match: Shaik Rasheed (IND)

- Bangladesh U-19 won the toss and elected to field.

=== Final ===
31 December 2021
9:30
Scorecard

Sri Lanka; 106/9 (38 overs)	v	India; 104/1 (21.3 overs)
Yasiru Rodrigo 19* (26); Vicky Ostwal 3/11 (8 overs)		Angkrish Raghuvanshi 56* (67); Yasiru Rodrigo 1/12 (3 overs)

India U-19 won by 9 wickets (DLS method)
Dubai International Cricket Stadium, Dubai
Umpires: Shiju Sam (UAE) and Tanvir Ahmed (Ban)
Player of the match: Vicky Ostwal (IND)

- Sri Lanka U-19 won the toss and elected to bat.
- India U-19 were set a revised target of 102 runs from 38 overs due to rain.
