= 2022–23 National T20 Cup =

Cricket tournament

- Dates: 30 August – 19 September 2022
- Administrator(s): Pakistan Cricket Board
- Cricket format: Twenty20
- Tournament format(s): Double round-robin and final
- Host(s): Pakistan
- Champions: Sindh (1st title)
- Runners-up: Khyber Pakhtunkhwa
- Participants: 6
- Matches: 33
- Player of the series: Saim Ayub (416 runs and 3 wickets)
- Most runs: Sahibzada Farhan (429)
- Most wickets: Sohail Khan (21)
- Official website: National T20 Cup

The 2022–23 National T20 Cup (also known as Kingdom Valley National T20 Cup 2022-23, for sponsorship reasons) was a Twenty20 domestic cricket competition played in Pakistan. It was the 19th season of the National T20 Cup, with the tournament starting from 30 August 2022 and the final being played on 19 September 2022. In August 2022, the Pakistan Cricket Board (PCB) confirmed the fixtures of the tournament. Khyber Pakhtunkhwa were the defending champions.

== Background ==
In August 2022, the Pakistani government announced the return of departmental cricket from the 2023 season, meaning this edition is likely to be the last to be carried out in the current format.

== Squads ==
On 25 August 2022, the PCB confirmed all the squads for the tournament.

Balochistan	Central Punjab	Khyber Pakhtunkhwa	Northern	Sindh	Southern Punjab
Yasir Shah (c); Shan Masood (vc); Abdul Bangalzai; Akif Javed; Ali Waqas; Amad Butt; Asad Shafiq; Haris Sohail; Haseebullah Khan (wk); Hussain Talat; Junaid Khan; Kashif Bhatti; Khurram Shahzad; Mohammad Junaid; Sajjad Ali	Faheem Ashraf (c); Abdullah Shafique (vc); Ahmed Daniyal; Ahmed Shehzad; Ali Asfand; Faizan Khan; Hunain Shah; Irfan Khan; Junaid Ali (wk); Mohammad Ali; Qasim Akram; Shoaib Malik; Tayyab Tahir; Usama Mir; Wahab Riaz	Khalid Usman (c); Kamran Ghulam (vc); Aamer Azmat; Abbas Afridi; Adil Amin; Arshad Iqbal; Asif Afridi; Ihsanullah; Imran Khan; Israrullah; Maaz Khan; Mohammad Amir Khan; Mohammad Haris (wk); Mohammad Sarwar; Sahibzada Farhan	Umar Amin (c); Ali Imran (vc); Aamer Jamal; Hassan Nawaz; Mehran Mumtaz; Mohammad Huraira; Mubasir Khan; Nasir Nawaz; Rohail Nazir (wk); Salman Irshad; Shoaib Amir; Sohail Tanvir; Umer Khan; Usman Shinwari; Zaman Khan	Saud Shakeel (c); Mir Hamza (vc); Abrar Ahmed; Anwar Ali; Asif Mehmood; Danish Aziz; Faraz Ali; Omair Yousuf; Rumman Raees; Saad Khan; Saim Ayub; Sarfaraz Ahmed (wk); Sharjeel Khan; Zahid Mahmood; Zeeshan Zameer	Hasan Ali (c); Agha Salman (vc); Aamer Yamin; Ahmed Bashir; Ali Majid; Faisal Akram; Hassan Khan; Mohammad Ilyas; Mohammad Imran; Moinuddin; Sameen Gul; Muhammad Shehzad; Sharoon Siraj; Sohaib Maqsood; Zain Abbas; Zeeshan Ashraf (wk)

== Venues ==
The tournament took place at Multan and Rawalpindi.

Rawalpindi	Multan
Rawalpindi Cricket Stadium	Multan Cricket Stadium
Capacity: 18,000	Capacity: 39,000
Matches: 16	Matches: 17
2022–23 National T20 Cup is located in Pakistan

== Points table ==
Pos	Team	Pld	W	L	NR	Pts	NRR	Qualification
1	Khyber Pakhtunkhwa	10	6	4	0	12	0.160	Semi-finals
2	Sindh	10	5	5	0	10	0.205	Semi-finals
3	Central Punjab	10	5	5	0	10	−0.109	Semi-finals
4	Northern	10	5	5	0	10	−0.185	Semi-finals
5	Balochistan	10	5	5	0	10	−0.457	
6	Southern Punjab	10	4	6	0	8	0.424	

Source: ESPNCricinfo

== Fixtures ==
=== Round-robin ===
30 August 2022
Scorecard

Sindh; 147 (19.4 overs)	v	Southern Punjab; 105 (16.4 overs)
Sarfaraz Ahmed 42 (32); Sameen Gul 3/24 (3.4 overs)		Sharoon Siraj 36 (27); Sohail Khan 3/15 (2.4 overs)

Sindh won by 42 runs
Rawalpindi Cricket Stadium, Rawalpindi
Umpires: Nasir Hussain and Rashid Riaz
Player of the match: Sarfaraz Ahmed (Sindh)

- Southern Punjab won the toss and elected to field.
- Saad Khan (Sindh) made his T20 debut.

30 August 2022
Scorecard

Balochistan; 186/4 (20 overs)	v	Central Punjab; 184/5 (20 overs)
Shan Masood 54 (36); Ahmed Daniyal 4/28 (4 overs)		Irfan Khan 57 (31); Amad Butt 3/29 (4 overs)

Balochistan won by 2 runs
Rawalpindi Cricket Stadium, Rawalpindi
Umpires: Faisal Afridi and Mohammad Sajid
Player of the match: Abdul Bangalzai (Balochistan) and Irfan Khan (Central Punjab)

- Balochistan won the toss and elected to bat.
- Haseebullah Khan (Balochistan), Junaid Ali and Ali Asfand (Central Punjab) all made their T20 debuts.

31 August 2022
Scorecard

Northern; 180/7 (20 overs)	v	Sindh; 190/7 (20 overs)
Nasir Nawaz 39 (21); Mir Hamza 3/33 (4 overs)		Saim Ayub 92 (52); Sohail Tanvir 3/28 (4 overs)

Sindh won by 10 runs
Rawalpindi Cricket Stadium, Rawalpindi
Umpires: Mohammad Asif and Rashid Riaz
Player of the match: Saim Ayub (Sindh)

- Northern won the toss and elected to field.
- Hassan Nawaz and Mehran Mumtaz (Northern) both made their T20 debuts.

31 August 2022
Scorecard

Central Punjab; 147 (19.1 overs)	v	Khyber Pakhtunkhwa; 165/6 (20 overs)
Tayyab Tahir 72 (45); Imran Khan 4/27 (4 overs)		Kamran Ghulam 39 (32); Ali Asfand 2/22 (4 overs)

Khyber Pakhtunkhwa won by 18 runs
Rawalpindi Cricket Stadium, Rawalpindi
Umpires: Aaley Haider and Imtiaz Iqbal
Player of the match: Imran Khan (Khyber Pakhtunkhwa)

- Khyber Pakhtunkhwa won the toss and elected to bat.

1 September 2022
Scorecard

Balochistan; 135/8 (20 overs)	v	Southern Punjab; 156/6 (20 overs)
Asad Shafiq 43 (35); Agha Salman 3/15 (4 overs)		Sharoon Siraj 57 (49); Yasir Shah 3/17 (4 overs)

Southern Punjab won by 21 runs
Rawalpindi Cricket Stadium, Rawalpindi
Umpires: Mohammad Sajid and Saqib Khan
Player of the match: Sharoon Siraj (Southern Punjab)

- Southern Punjab won the toss and elected to bat.

1 September 2022
Scorecard

Khyber Pakhtunkhwa; 159/8 (20 overs)	v	Northern; 157/5 (20 overs)
Sahibzada Farhan 53 (45); Usman Shinwari 3/26 (4 overs)		Hassan Nawaz 38 (25); Khalid Usman 2/16 (4 overs)

Khyber Pakhtunkhwa won by 2 runs
Rawalpindi Cricket Stadium, Rawalpindi
Umpires: Faisal Afridi and Nasir Hussain
Player of the match: Khalid Usman (Khyber Pakhtunkhwa)

- Khyber Pakhtunkhwa won the toss and elected to bat.

2 September 2022
Scorecard

Sindh; 142/7 (20 overs)	v	Balochistan; 143/5 (18.5 overs)
Saad Khan 31 (27); Yasir Shah 2/23 (4 overs); Kashif Bhatti 2/23 (4 overs)		Shan Masood 53* (39); Sohail Khan 2/35 (3.5 overs)

Balochistan won by 5 wickets
Rawalpindi Cricket Stadium, Rawalpindi
Umpires: Mohammad Asif and Imtiaz Iqbal
Player of the match: Shan Masood (Balochistan)

- Sindh won the toss and elected to bat.

2 September 2022
Scorecard

Southern Punjab; 165/8 (20 overs)	v	Central Punjab; 79 (14.3 overs)
Zain Abbas 65 (44); Ahmed Daniyal 3/27 (3 overs)		Usama Mir 17 (13); Agha Salman 5/10 (3 overs)

Southern Punjab won by 86 runs
Rawalpindi Cricket Stadium, Rawalpindi
Umpires: Aaley Haider and Sadiq Khan
Player of the match: Agha Salman (Southern Punjab)

- Southern Punjab won the toss and elected to bat.
- Muhammad Shehzad (Southern Punjab) made his T20 debut.

4 September 2022
Scorecard

Northern; 146/7 (16 overs)	v	Central Punjab; 143/5 (16 overs)
Ali Imran 56 (34); Mohammad Ali 3/33 (4 overs)		Tayyab Tahir 53 (39); Salman Irshad 2/27 (4 overs)

Northern won by 3 runs
Rawalpindi Cricket Stadium, Rawalpindi
Umpires: Zameer Haider and Nasir Hussain
Player of the match: Ali Imran (Northern)

- Central Punjab won the toss and elected to field.
- The match was reduced to 16 overs per side due to rain.
- Mohammad Ali (Central Punjab) made his T20 debut.

4 September 2022
Scorecard

Sindh; 151/4 (20 overs)	v	Khyber Pakhtunkhwa; 154/4 (18.4 overs)
Saad Khan 40 (36); Mohammad Imran 2/30 (4 overs)		Sahibzada Farhan 45 (34); Zahid Mahmood 2/32 (4 overs)

Khyber Pakhtunkhwa won by 6 wickets
Rawalpindi Cricket Stadium, Rawalpindi
Umpires: Sadiq Khan and Mohammad Sajid
Player of the match: Adil Amin (Khyber Pakhtunkhwa)

- Sindh won the toss and elected to bat.

5 September 2022
Scorecard

Southern Punjab; 41/4 (5 overs)	v	Khyber Pakhtunkhwa; 44/3 (4.3 overs)
Zain Abbas 14 (8); Imran Khan 1/12 (1 over)		Aamer Azmat 14* (10); Mohammad Ilyas 2/14 (1.3 overs)

Khyber Pakhtunkhwa won by 7 wickets
Rawalpindi Cricket Stadium, Rawalpindi
Umpires: Mohammad Asif and Imtiaz Iqbal
Player of the match: Mohammad Imran (Khyber Pakhtunkhwa)

- Khyber Pakhtunkhwa won the toss and elected to field.
- The match was reduced to 5 overs per side due to rain.

5 September 2022
Scorecard

Balochistan; 181/3 (20 overs)	v	Northern; 162/7 (20 overs)
Haseebullah Khan 52 (44); Sohail Tanvir 1/32 (4 overs)		Sohail Tanvir 74* (41); Hussain Talat 3/17 (3 overs)

Balochistan won by 19 runs
Rawalpindi Cricket Stadium, Rawalpindi
Umpires: Faisal Afridi and Aaley Haider
Player of the match: Haseebullah Khan (Balochistan) and Sohail Tanvir (Northern)

- Northern won the toss and elected to field.

6 September 2022
Scorecard

Central Punjab; 188/5 (20 overs)	v	Sindh; 177/8 (20 overs)
Shoaib Malik 54* (33); Abrar Ahmed 2/34 (4 overs)		Sarfaraz Ahmed 62* (37); Usama Mir 3/34 (4 overs)

Central Punjab won by 11 runs.
Rawalpindi Cricket Stadium, Rawalpindi
Umpires: Mohammad Sajid and Waleed Yaqub
Player of the match: Shoaib Malik (Central Punjab)

- Central Punjab won the toss and elected to bat.

6 September 2022
Scorecard

Northern; 187/8 (20 overs)	v	Southern Punjab; 182 (19.5 overs)
Umar Amin 52 (42); Sameen Gul 3/27 (4 overs)		Zain Abbas 81 (46); Aamer Jamal 3/27 (4 overs)

Northern won by 5 runs
Rawalpindi Cricket Stadium, Rawalpindi
Umpires: Aaley Haider and Imtiaz Iqbal
Player of the match: Aamer Jamal (Northern)

- Northern won the toss and elected to bat.

7 September 2022
Scorecard

Khyber Pakhtunkhwa; 201/5 (20 overs)	v	Balochistan; 174 (18.5 overs)
Kamran Ghulam 57 (38); Haris Sohail 2/10 (1 over)		Yasir Shah 44 (27); Mohammad Imran 4/28 (3.5 overs)

Khyber Pakhtunkhwa won by 27 runs
Rawalpindi Cricket Stadium, Rawalpindi
Umpires: Mohammad Asif and Zameer Haider
Player of the match: Mohammad Sarwar (Khyber Pakhtunkhwa)

- Khyber Pakhtunkhwa won the toss and elected to bat.

7 September 2022
Scorecard

Southern Punjab; 175/6 (20 overs)	v	Sindh; 181/4 (19.2 overs)
Zain Abbas 48 (34); Abrar Ahmed 3/30 (4 overs)		Saim Ayub 56 (35); Hassan Khan 2/21 (4 overs)

Sindh won by 6 wickets
Rawalpindi Cricket Stadium, Rawalpindi
Umpires: Nasir Hussain and Saqib Khan
Player of the match: Saim Ayub (Sindh)

- Sindh won the toss and elected to field.

10 September 2022
Scorecard

Northern; 190/4 (20 overs)	v	Sindh; 189/7 (20 overs)
Mohammad Huraira 86 (52); Saim Ayub 1/18 (2 overs)		Saud Shakeel 70 (43); Mubasir Khan 2/31 (3 overs)

Northern won by 1 run
Multan Cricket Stadium, Multan
Umpires: Sadiq Khan and Waleed Yaqub
Player of the match: Mohammad Huraira (Northern)

- Sindh won the toss and elected to field.

10 September 2022
Scorecard

Central Punjab; 169/9 (20 overs)	v	Balochistan; 173/3 (19 overs)
Shoaib Malik 44 (30); Amad Butt 4/30 (4 overs)		Haseebullah Khan 72 (53); Muhammad Faizan 2/26 (3 overs)

Balochistan won by 7 wickets
Multan Cricket Stadium, Multan
Umpires: Nasir Hussain and Tariq Rasheed
Player of the match: Haseebullah Khan (Balochistan)

- Central Punjab won the toss and elected to bat.

11 September 2022
Scorecard

Central Punjab; 193 (20 overs)	v	Khyber Pakhtunkhwa; 168/9 (20 overs)
Tayyab Tahir 75 (48); Maaz Khan 4/46 (4 overs)		Sahibzada Farhan 47 (31); Ali Asfand 2/14 (2 overs)

Central Punjab won by 25 runs
Multan Cricket Stadium, Multan
Umpires: Imran Javed and Rashid Riaz
Player of the match: Muhammad Faizan (Khyber Pakhtunkhwa)

- Khyber Pakhtunkhwa won the toss and elected to field.
- Hunain Shah (Central Punjab) made his T20 debut.

11 September 2022
Scorecard

Balochistan; 144 (20 overs)	v	Southern Punjab; 54/0 (6 overs)
Kashif Bhatti 27 (18); Ali Majid 3/27 (4 overs)		Umar Siddiq 32* (20)

Southern Punjab won by 20 runs (DLS method)
Multan Cricket Stadium, Multan
Umpires: Tariq Rasheed and Shozab Raza
Player of the match: Ali Majid (Southern Punjab)

- Southern Punjab won the toss and elected to field.
- No further play was possible and Southern Punjab were 20 runs ahead the DLS par score of 35 runs from 6 overs.

12 September 2022
Scorecard

Northern; 152 (20 overs)	v	Khyber Pakhtunkhwa; 146/6 (20 overs)
Zeeshan Malik 52 (40); Ihsanullah 3/35 (4 overs)		Mohammad Haris 41 (17); Mehran Mumtaz 3/20 (4 overs)

Northern won by 6 runs
Multan Cricket Stadium, Multan
Umpires: Zameer Haider and Waleed Yaqub
Player of the match: Mehran Mumtaz (Northern)

- Northern won the toss and elected to bat.

12 September 2022
Scorecard

Balochistan; 158/4 (20 overs)	v	Sindh; 160/1 (17 overs)
Abdul Bangalzai 67 (47); Abrar Ahmed 1/23 (4 overs)		Sharjeel Khan 107* (62); Kashif Bhatti 1/25 (4 overs)

Sindh won by 9 wickets
Multan Cricket Stadium, Multan
Umpires: Sadiq Khan and Rashid Riaz
Player of the match: Sharjeel Khan (Sindh)

- Sindh won the toss and elected to field.

13 September 2022
Scorecard

Southern Punjab; 106 (19.2 overs)	v	Central Punjab; 110/6 (16.5 overs)
Zain Abbas 25 (26); Aamer Yamin 3/16 (4 overs)		Tayyab Tahir 41* (34); Mohammad Imran 2/18 (3.5 overs)

Central Punjab won by 4 wickets
Multan Cricket Stadium, Multan
Umpires: Faisal Afridi and Shozab Raza
Player of the match: Tayyab Tahir (Central Punjab)

- Central Punjab won the toss and elected to field.

13 September 2022
Scorecard

Khyber Pakhtunkhwa; 147/9 (20 overs)	v	Sindh; 148/7 (19.4 overs)
Sahibzada Farhan 44 (36); Asif Mehmood 3/28 (3 overs)		Saad Khan 31 (28); Ihsanullah 2/16 (4 overs)

Sindh won by 3 wickets
Multan Cricket Stadium, Multan
Umpires: Zameer Haider and Imran Javed
Player of the match: Asif Mehmood (Sindh)

- Sindh won the toss and elected to field.

15 September 2022
Scorecard

Northern; 168/6 (20 overs)	v	Balochistan; 169/5 (19.3 overs)
Umar Amin 67* (48); Akif Javed 2/39 (4 overs)		Haris Sohail 52* (36); Mubasir Khan 2/21 (4 overs)

Balochistan won by 5 wickets
Multan Cricket Stadium, Multan
Umpires: Faisal Afridi and Tariq Rasheed
Player of the match: Haris Sohail (Balochistan)

- Northern won the toss and elected to bat.

15 September 2022
Scorecard

Central Punjab; 166 (19.4 overs)	v	Sindh; 149/5 (20 overs)
Qasim Akram 51 (26); Sohail Khan 3/38 (4 overs)		Saim Ayub 46 (33); Ahmed Daniyal 2/24 (4 overs)

Central Punjab won by 17 runs
Multan Cricket Stadium, Multan
Umpires: Imran Javed and Ahsan Raza
Player of the match: Qasim Akram and Aamer Yamin (Central Punjab)

- Sindh won the toss and elected to field.

16 September 2022
Scorecard

Northern; 162/5 (20 overs)	v	Central Punjab; 163/4 (18 overs)
Nasir Nawaz 82 (57); Aamer Yamin 3/29 (4 overs)		Shoaib Malik 62* (39); Sohail Tanvir 1/15 (3 overs)

Central Punjab won by 6 wickets
Multan Cricket Stadium, Multan
Umpires: Rashid Riaz and Asif Yaqoob
Player of the match: Qasim Akram and Shoaib Malik (Central Punjab)

- Northern won the toss and elected to bat.

16 September 2022
Scorecard

Khyber Pakhtunkhwa; 133 (20 overs)	v	Southern Punjab; 136/4 (15.1 overs)
Kamran Ghulam 54 (40); Hassan Khan 3/21 (4 overs)		Sohaib Maqsood 61* (44); Khalid Usman 1/20 (2 overs)

Southern Punjab won by 6 wickets
Multan Cricket Stadium, Multan
Umpires: Shozab Raza and Waleed Yaqub
Player of the match: Sohaib Maqsood (Southern Punjab)

- Khyber Pakhtunkhwa won the toss and elected to bat.

17 September 2022
Scorecard

Khyber Pakhtunkhwa; 175/3 (20 overs)	v	Balochistan; 137 (17 overs)
Sahibzada Farhan 102 (64); Junaid Khan 2/34 (4 overs)		Haris Sohail 47 (30); Khalid Usman 3/19 (3 overs)

Khyber Pakhtunkhwa won by 38 runs
Multan Cricket Stadium, Multan
Umpires: Tariq Rasheed and Shozab Raza
Player of the match: Sahibzada Farhan (Khyber Pakhtunkhwa)

- Balochistan won the toss and elected to field.

17 September 2022
Scorecard

Northern; 129/8 (20 overs)	v	Southern Punjab; 126/7 (20 overs)
Sohail Tanvir 40* (30); Mohammad Ilyas 3/29 (4 overs)		Hasan Ali 26* (16); Mehran Mumtaz 2/17 (4 overs); Zaman Khan 2/17 (4 overs)

Northern won by 3 runs
Multan Cricket Stadium, Multan
Umpires: Imran Javed and Waleed Yaqub
Player of the match: Mehran Mumtaz (Northern) and Sohail Tanvir (Northern)

- Northern won the toss and elected to bat.

== Finals ==
Semi-finals
4	Northern	164/4 (20 overs)
1	Khyber Pakhtunkhwa	165/4 (19 overs)
3	Central Punjab	179/8 (20 overs)
2	Sindh	185/5 (19.2 overs)

Final
1	Khyber Pakhtunkhwa	140 (19.5 overs)
2	Sindh	141/2 (14.4 overs)

1st Semi-final
18 September 2022
Scorecard

Northern; 164/4 (20 overs)	v	Khyber Pakhtunkhwa; 165/5 (19 overs)
Nasir Nawaz 72 (55); Arshad Iqbal 2/34 (4 overs)		Rehan Afridi 54 (39); Zaman Khan 2/24 (4 overs)

Khyber Pakhtunkhwa won by 5 wickets
Multan Cricket Stadium, Multan
Umpires: Shozab Raza and Waleed Yaqub
Player of the match: Rehan Afridi (Khyber Pakhtunkhwa)

- Northern won the toss and elected to bat.

2nd Semi-final
18 September 2022
Scorecard

Central Punjab; 179/8 (20 overs)	v	Sindh; 185/5 (19.2 overs)
Faizan Khan 52 (31); Zahid Mahmood 4/20 (4 overs)		Omair Yousuf 51* (36); Usama Mir 2/30 (3.1 overs)

Sindh won by 5 wickets
Multan Cricket Stadium, Multan
Umpires: Zameer Haider and Imran Javed
Player of the match: Zahid Mahmood (Sindh) and Omair Yousuf (Sindh)

- Central Punjab won the toss and elected to bat.

Final
19 September 2022
Scorecard

Khyber Pakhtunkhwa; 140 (19.5 overs)	v	Sindh; 141/2 (14.4 overs)
Rehan Afridi 43 (41); Sohail Khan 4/18 (4 overs)		Sharjeel Khan 53 (36); Mohammad Sarwar 1/10 (2 overs)

Sindh won by 8 wickets
Multan Cricket Stadium, Multan
Umpires: Zameer Haider and Shozab Raza
Player of the match: Sohail Khan (Sindh)

- Khyber Pakhtunkhwa won the toss and elected to bat.

== Awards ==
=== End of the season awards ===
Name	Team	Award	Prize
Saim Ayub	Sindh	Player of the Tournament	Rs. 100,000
Sahibzada Farhan	Khyber Pakhtunkhwa	Best Batsman of the tournament	Rs. 100,000
Sohail Khan	Sindh	Best Bowler of the tournament	Rs. 100,000
Sarfaraz Ahmed	Sindh	Best Wicket-keeper of the tournament	Rs. 100,000
