= Trilochan Singh =

Indian field hockey player

Olympic medal record

Men's Field Hockey
Gold medal – first place	1948 London	Team competition

Tarlochan Singh Bawa (12 February 1923 – 24 April 2008) was an Indian field hockey player who competed (and won gold) in the 1948 London Olympics. His grandson Raj Bawa was one of the members of the winning team in the ICC Under-19 Cricket World Cup 2022.
