= Diego Martin Sporting Complex =

Cricket ground

Coordinates: 10.7322°N 61.5617°W

- Interactive map of Diego Martin Sporting Complex
- Location: Savannah Road, Diego Martin, Trinidad
- Country: Trinidad and Tobago
- Establishment: 2019
- Capacity: 2000
- Owner: Ministry of Sport and Youth Affairs
- Architect: UDeCOTT
- Operator: Cricket West Indies
- Tenants: Trinidad and Tobago national cricket team
- As of 17 March 2024; Source: CricketArchive UDeCOTT

Diego Martin Sporting Complex is a multipurpose sporting complex in Trinidad and Tobago, situated in Savannah Terrace, Diego Martin. The foundation for the facility was laid in 2010, though the project was later abandoned. In 2016, work on the project resumed with improvements made to the original plan. The construction of the $115 million facility was completed in 2019 and was officially opened by the then Prime Minister Keith Rowley in March 2019. The plot was developed by the UDeCOTT.

In November 2021, it was announced that the venue would host four matches of the 2022 Under-19 Men's Cricket World Cup. In March 2022, the Cricket West Indies (CWI) confirmed that the ground would host matches of the 2021–22 West Indies Championship. The first recorded first-class match on the ground was held on 18 May 2022, between Trinidad and Tobago and the Leeward Islands.

On 3rd September 2024, UDeCOTT announced that works around constructing Phase 2 of the Diego Martin Sports Complex was in preparation. This second phase would introduce a homework centre, children's play park, community play field, two multipurpose hard courts, a swimming pool, a pavilion, public washrooms and an electronic kiosk. These amenities would run along Savannah Road #2, until the road meets Mahogany Trace. Several farmers utilised the land which was earmarked for this second phase. With the land being owned by the state, UDeCOTT offered land to three farmers in Tucker Valley, Chaguaramas, but two of the three farmers refused to move and demanded over TT$1.1 million each. Due to this, UDeCOTT organised for the Office of the Commissioner for State Lands to serve a notice to vacate the land, where tractors were then sent to bulldoze any infrastructure on the land, much to the displeasure of the farmers, who felt that UDeCOTT had not been fair to them throughout the process. This second phase, as well as improvements on the first phase, was halted by the new Minister of Sports and Youth Affairs, Phillip Watts, citing that it was "under review", leading to no allocation for the sporting complex in the 2025/2026 fiscal year, despite TT$5 million being procured by the former government, dedicated for refurbishment works.
