= Georgia Wyllie =

Australian cricketer

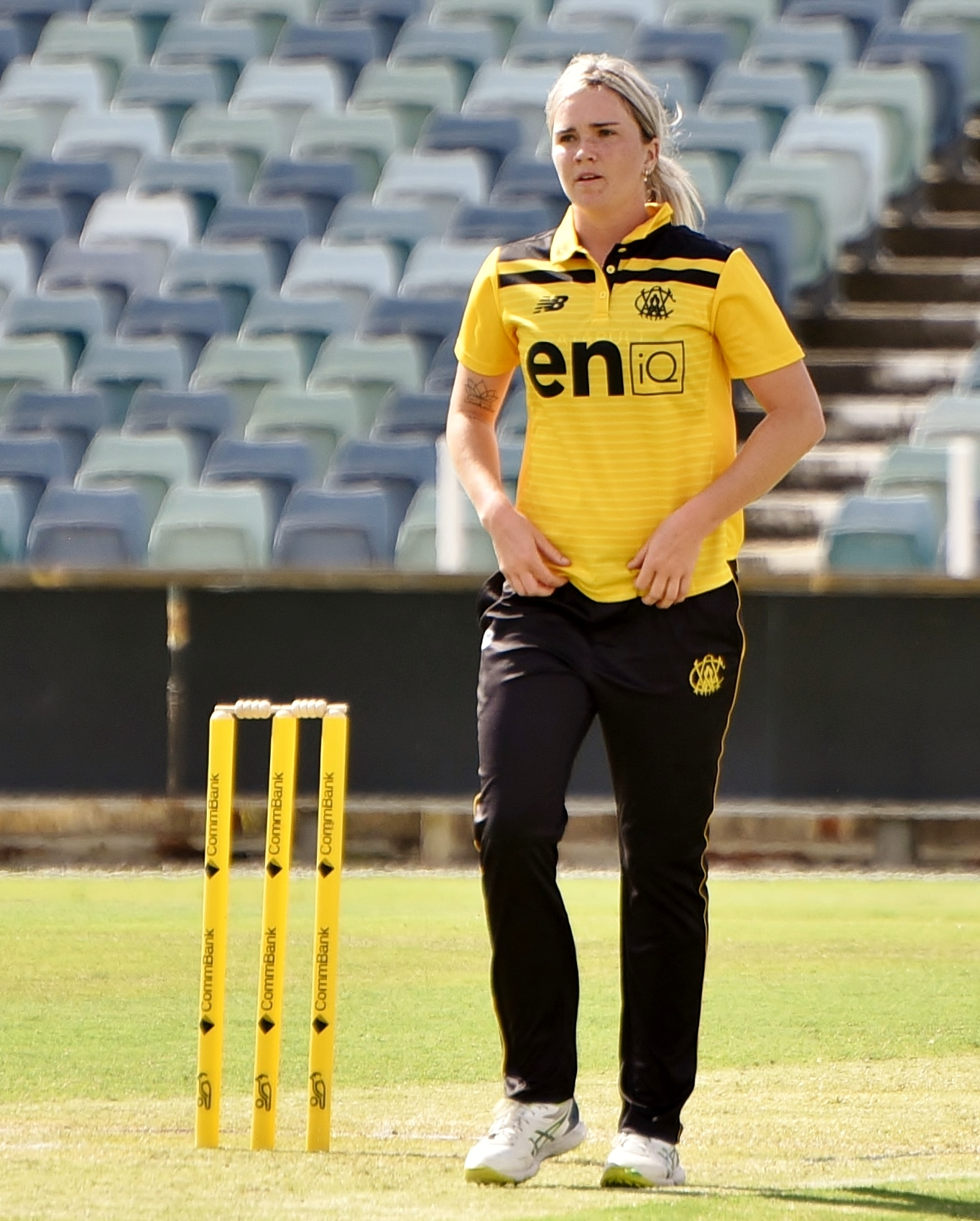
- Wyllie playing for WA in September 2022

Personal information
- Full name: Georgia L Wyllie
- Born: 3 May 2002 (age 24); Mandurah, Western Australia
- Batting: Right-handed
- Bowling: Left-arm medium
- Role: All-rounder
- Relatives: Teague Wyllie (brother)

Domestic team information
- Years: Team
- 2020/21: Perth Scorchers
- 2021/22–present: Western Australia
- 2022/23: Perth Scorchers

Career statistics
Competition	WLA
Matches	10
Runs scored	32
Batting average	8.00
100s/50s	0/0
Top score	13
Balls bowled	89
Wickets	1
Bowling average	97.00
5 wickets in innings	0
10 wickets in match	0
Best bowling	1/17
Catches/stumpings	2/–
- Source: CricketArchive, 17 October 2022

Georgia L Wyllie (born 3 May 2002) is an Australian cricketer who plays as a right-handed batter and left-arm medium bowler for Western Australia in the Women's National Cricket League (WNCL).

== Domestic career ==
Wyllie was in the Perth Scorchers squad for the 2020–21 Women's Big Bash League season, but did not play a match. She made her debut for Western Australia on 27 February 2022, against South Australia in the WNCL, scoring 6* and taking 1/32. She went on to play six matches overall for the side that season, with best bowling figures of 2/49. She played three matches for the side in the 2022–23 WNCL, as well as continuing in the Perth Scorchers squad without playing a match.
