= Shaik Rasheed =

Indian cricketer (born 2004)

Personal information
- Born: 24 September 2004 (age 22); Guntur, Andhra Pradesh, India
- Batting: Right-handed
- Bowling: Right-arm leg break
- Role: Top-order Batsman

Domestic team information
- Years: Team
- 2022–present: Andhra Pradesh
- 2025: Chennai Super Kings (squad no. 66)
- FC debut: 24 February 2022 Andhra v Services
- LA debut: 17 November 2022 Andhra v Bihar

Career statistics
Competition	FC	LA	T20
Matches	19	12	22
Runs scored	1,204	128	423
Batting average	37.62	11.63	24.88
100s/50s	2/7	0/0	1/1
Top score	203	42	100*
Balls bowled	98	25	36
Wickets	1	0	1
Bowling average	90.00	–	50.00
5 wickets in innings	0	–	0
10 wickets in match	0	–	0
Best bowling	1/11	–	1/18
Catches/stumpings	16/–	5/–	11/–
Medal record
Men's cricket
Representing India
ICC U19 Men's Cricket World Cup
Winner	2022 West Indies
ACC U19 Men's Asia Cup
Winner	2021 Dubai
- Source: Cricinfo, 18 April

Shaik Rasheed (born 24 September 2004) is an Indian cricketer. He was born in Guntur, Andhra Pradesh. He plays for Chennai Super Kings in the Indian Premier League as a right-handed batsman and was the team's youngest-ever player. He was the vice-captain of the India under-19s team that won the Under-19 Men's Cricket World Cup in 2022.

== India under-19 career ==
In 2021, Rasheed represented India in the Under-19 Men's Asia Cup. He scored an unbeaten 90 to guide India to the final.

Rasheed has been a part of the India Under-19 team. He was named as vice-captain for the 2022 ICC Under-19 Cricket World Cup. In the semi-final where he scored 94 runs against Australia to help India reach the final.

== Domestic career ==
Rasheed made his first-class debut on 24 February 2022, for Andhra Pradesh against Services in the 2021–22 Ranji Trophy, where he scored 23 runs before being caught out. Later in the year on 17 November, Rasheed proceeded to make his List A debut for Andhra against Bihar. Rasheed made his Twenty20 debut on 16 October 2022, for Andhra Pradesh against Nagaland in the 2022–23 Syed Mushtaq Ali Trophy.

Rasheed was included in the Chennai Super Kings squad the 2023 Indian Premier League season. On 14 April 2025 he made his IPL debut against Lucknow Super Giants at 20 years and 202 days, becoming CSK's youngest-ever player.
