= Nathan Barnwell =

English cricketer

Personal information
- Full name: Nathan André Barnwell
- Born: 3 February 2003 (age 23); Ashford, Kent, England
- Batting: Right-handed
- Bowling: Right-arm medium

Domestic team information
- Years: Team
- 2022–2025: Surrey (squad no. 29)
- First-class debut: 20 May 2022; Surrey v SLC Development XI
- List A debut: 10 August 2022 Surrey v Middlesex

Career statistics
Competition	First-class	List A
Matches	1	16
Runs scored	22	201
Batting average	22.00	22.33
100s/50s	0/0	0/0
Top score	22	43*
Balls bowled	138	519
Wickets	1	7
Bowling average	100.00	92.71
5 wickets in innings	0	0
10 wickets in match	0	0
Best bowling	1/68	3/55
Catches/stumpings	0/–	3/–
- Source: ESPNcricinfo, 26 August 2025

Nathan André Barnwell (born 3 February 2003) is an English cricketer who plays for Surrey. He is a right-handed batsman and right arm medium bowler.

== Personal life ==
He had begun playing backyard cricket with his father and siblings. He is a fan of Crystal Palace. Barnwell attended Caterham School and played cricket as part of the Surrey pathway since under-9 level.

== Career ==
Barnwell was given a rookie contract with Surrey in October 2021. He made List A debut on 10 August 2022 in the Royal London One-Day Cup against Middlesex at Radlett.

== International career ==
Barnwell made his debut for England U19s in September 2021 against the West Indies U19s. He was named in the England squad for the 2022 ICC Under-19 Cricket World Cup held in the West Indies.
