= Ali Asfand =

Pakistani cricketer (born 2004)

Personal information
- Born: 22 November 2004 (age 21); Faisalabad, Punjab, Pakistan
- Batting: Right-handed
- Bowling: Slow left-arm orthodox
- Role: Bowler

Domestic team information
- Years: Team
- 2021/22–2023: Central Punjab

Career statistics
Competition	FC	LA	T20
Matches	6	12	10
Runs scored	112	87	26
Batting average	11.20	29.00	19.50
100s/50s	0/0	0/0	0/0
Top score	40	28*	11
Balls bowled	492	617	122
Wickets	3	9	8
Bowling average	126.00	55.00	19.50
5 wickets in innings	0	0	0
10 wickets in match	0	0	0
Best bowling	1/13	2/37	2/14
Catches/stumpings	7/–	0/–	4/–
- Source: Cricinfo, 22 March 2025

Ali Asfand (Punjabi: علی اسفند; born 22 November 2004) is a Pakistani cricketer who plays for Central Punjab. Asfand made his List A debut for Central Punjab against Northern during the 2021-22 Pakistan Cup on 16 March 2022. Asfand made his T20 debut for Central Punjab against Balochistan during the 2022-23 National T20 Cup on 30 August 2022. Asfand also played for the Pakistan national under-19 cricket team during the 2022 ICC Under-19 Cricket World Cup. Asfand was named in the squad for the 2023 ACC Under-19 Asia Cup. He was also named in the squad for the 2024 Under-19 Cricket World Cup.
