= Wigan Cricket Club =

English sports club

Wigan Cricket Club is an English sports club in Lancashire founded in 1848. Located at Bull Hey, Parsons Walk, near the town centre of Wigan, its members voted in 2009 to change its name to Wigan Sports Club in recognition of the multiple sports it now hosts.

As of 2024, the club fields three senior sides in the Liverpool and District Cricket Competition, with the junior sides playing in the Wigan and District Cricket League.

== History ==
In 1864, Wigan Cricket Club was one of 13 clubs that founded the Lancashire County Cricket Club.

In 1872, its members also founded Wigan Football Club, a rugby club now known as the Wigan Warriors. The cricket players kept themselves active in the winter by playing rugby. In 2023, the Wigan Rugby Heritage Society presented the Wigan Cricket Club with a trophy certificate and documentation in recognition of the club's role in bringing the game of rugby to the local community.

Sir Bradley Wiggins's Wigan Wheelers Cycling Club is based at Wigan Cricket Club.

== Notable players ==
- Josh Boyden, a former England under-19 cricket team player who went on to play at Lancashire Cricket Club
- Adnan Miekhal, a former asylum seeker from Afghanistan, who was featured in the BBC television programme, Flintoff's Field of Dreams with Andrew Flintoff
