= Asif Mehmood (cricketer) =

Pakistani cricketer

Asif Mehmood آصف محمود
Personal information
- Born: 3 February 1996 (age 30); Hyderabad, Sindh, Pakistan
- Batting: Right-handed
- Bowling: Right-arm medium
- Role: Bowler

Domestic team information
- Years: Team
- 2014/15: Hyderabad Hawks
- 2015/16: Hyderabad
- 2017/18: WAPDA
- 2021/22–present: Sindh
- 2026: Washington Freedom

Career statistics
| Competition | LA | T20 | FC |
|---|---|---|---|
| Matches | 10 | 6 | 7 |
| Runs scored | 60 | 41 | 209 |
| Batting average | 12.00 | – | 23.22 |
| 100s/50s | 0/0 | 0/0 | 0/1 |
| Top score | 23 | 28* | 78 |
| Balls bowled | 372 | 131 | 984 |
| Wickets | 12 | 9 | 14 |
| Bowling average | 33.41 | 21.77 | 52.07 |
| 5 wickets in innings | 0 | 0 | 0 |
| 10 wickets in match | 0 | 0 | 0 |
| Best bowling | 2/35 | 3/28 | 4/59 |
| Catches/stumpings | 3/– | 2/– | 1/– |
- Source: Cricinfo, 22 September 2022

Asif Mehmood (Urdu: آصف محمود; born 3 February 1996) is a Pakistani cricketer who plays for Sindh. and for Washington Freedom in Major League Cricket. Mehmood made his List A debut for Hyderabad Hawks against WAPDA. He was called up to the Pakistan national under-19 cricket team in December 2014. Mehmood made his T20 debut for Sindh against Southern Punjab during the 2022–23 National T20 Cup on 7 September 2022. On 14 September 2022, Mehmood took a hat-trick against Khyber Pakhtunkhwa.
