= UDeCOTT =

Urban Development Corporation of Trinidad and Tobago (UDeCOTT)
- Formation: December 28, 1994
- Location(s): 38-40 Sackville Street Port of Spain
- Website: http://www.udecott.com/

The Urban Development Corporation of Trinidad and Tobago (UDeCOTT), is a state owned company of Trinidad and Tobago. It was founded on December 28, 1994. It is carrying out construction projects that form Vision 2030, which is the plan created by the government, to achieve first world status, by the year 2030. The project is worth several billion dollars. In May 2008, the Trinidad and Tobago Institute of Architects called for an audit of UDeCOTT due to poor business practices.
