= George Bell (cricketer) =

English cricketer

Personal information
- Full name: George Joseph Bell
- Born: 25 September 2002 (age 24); Manchester, England
- Batting: Right-handed
- Bowling: Right-arm off break
- Role: Wicket-keeper, Batsman

Domestic team information
- Years: Team
- 2022–2026: Lancashire (squad no. 17)
- 2026: → Essex (loan)
- 2027–present: Essex
- FC debut: 20 September 2022 Lancashire v Essex
- LA debut: 10 August 2022 Lancashire v Worcs

Career statistics
Competition	FC	LA	T20
Matches	37	24	9
Runs scored	1,403	665	87
Batting average	25.05	28.91	21.75
100s/50s	0/9	1/4	0/0
Top score	99	104	31
Balls bowled	167	18	–
Wickets	1	1	–
Bowling average	118.00	20.00	–
5 wickets in innings	0	0	–
10 wickets in match	0	0	–
Best bowling	1/28	1/20	–
Catches/stumpings	52/2	14/7	4/0
- Source: ESPNcricinfo, 26 September 2026

George Joseph Bell (born 25 September 2002) is an English cricketer who plays for Essex County Cricket Club. He is a right-handed batter and right-handed off break bowler who can also play as a wicket keeper.

== Early life ==
Bell attended Manchester Grammar School and played cricket for Alderley Edge, and also had a stint at Stretford Cricket Club. He played for the Lancashire under-17 team. In September 2020, aged 17, Bell hit a century for the England Young Lions.

== Career ==
After playing regularly for Lancashire second XI throughout 2021, he signed a contract with the club in November 2021. Bell was named in the England under-19 squad for the 2022 ICC Under-19 Cricket World Cup held in the Caribbean in early 2022. He scored 56 not out in the semi-final in an unbeaten seventh wicket partnership of 95, after coming in to bat with England on 92 for the loss of four wickets. It was his second half century of the tournament.

Bell made his senior debut in June 2022 in the 2022 t20 Blast against Durham at Blackpool, scoring 31 runs from 25 balls. Although Bell had been named in the squad the day before he was unaware that he was playing until arriving at the ground on the day. In August 2022 he made his List A cricket debut for Lancashire against Worcestershire scoring 35 runs, and the following month made his first-class debut against Essex. Bell scored his maiden first-class half century against Essex in April 2023. On 13 June 2023 Bell got his maiden county championship wicket (Liam Dawson) against Hampshire.

Having spent part of the 2026 season on loan at Essex, Bell joined the club on a permanent two-year contract in October that year.
