= Jack Nisbet (cricketer) =

Australian cricketer (born 2003)

Personal information
- Born: 27 January 2003 (age 23)
- Batting: Right-handed
- Bowling: Right-arm fast medium
- Role: Bowler

Domestic team information
- Years: Team
- 2023/24–present: New South Wales
- FC debut: 9 October 2023 NSW v South Australia
- LA debut: 9 October 2023 NSW v Queensland

Career statistics
| Competition | FC | LA |
|---|---|---|
| Matches | 7 | 10 |
| Runs scored | 83 | 32 |
| Batting average | 9.22 | 8.00 |
| 100s/50s | 0/0 | 0/0 |
| Top score | 20* | 16* |
| Balls bowled | 921 | 498 |
| Wickets | 21 | 18 |
| Bowling average | 24.85 | 26.11 |
| 5 wickets in innings | 1 | 0 |
| 10 wickets in match | 0 | 0 |
| Best bowling | 5/53 | 4/49 |
| Catches/stumpings | 2/– | 3/– |
- Source: CricInfo, 25 October 2026

Jack Nisbet (born 27 January 2003) is an Australian cricketer who plays for New South Wales. A right-handed batsman, and a right arm fast pace bowler, he made his List-A cricket debut for New South Wales on 9 October 2023 against Queensland.

== Career ==
Nisbet commenced playing NSW Premier Cricket in Green Shield (Under 16s) with Hawkesbury Cricket Club in 2016–2017.

In 2018-2019 he joined Sydney Cricket Club and made his first grade debut in 2020–2021.

Nisbet played a significant part in Sydney Cricket Club winning the 1st Grade Grand Final (Belvidere Cup) by recording the outstanding figures of 9-6-23-3. His wickets included former NSW Wicket-keeper Jay Lenton and future NSW batter Ollie Davies.

In 2021-2022 Nisbet was awarded a rookie contract with New South Wales which has continued for the 2023–2024 season.

He represented the Australia U-19 side in the 2022 in the ICC Under-19 Cricket World Cup in the West Indies.

in season 2023-2024 Nisbet commenced to play club cricket for Mosman Cricket Club in Mosman, north Sydney.

Nisbet made his List-A cricket debut for New South Wales against Queensland Bulls on 11 October 2023, finishing with figures of 3/59. He was involved in a reportedly controversial moment in his very first over following his dismissal of Ben McDermott in which he pointed him towards the dressing rooms, for which he apologised after the game explaining that the adrenaline of the moment had got the better of him.

The following week, he made his Sheffield Shield debut against South Australia cricket team, taking 5-53.

== International career ==
Nisbet was named in the Australia under-19 squad for the 2022 Under-19 Cricket World Cup.
