= Muzamil Sherzad =

Irish cricketer

Personal information
- Born: 5 October 2002 (age 24); Jalalabad, Nangarhar Province, Afghanistan
- Batting: Right-handed
- Bowling: Right-arm medium-fast
- Role: Bowler

Domestic team information
- Years: Team
- 2022: Leinster Lightning

Career statistics
Competition	List A
Matches	1
Runs scored	–
Batting average	–
100s/50s	–/–
Top score	–
Balls bowled	18
Wickets	0
Bowling average	–
5 wickets in innings	–
10 wickets in match	–
Best bowling	–
Catches/stumpings	0/–
- Source: Cricinfo, 3 May 2022

Muzamil Sherzad (Pashto: مزمل شېرزاد; born 5 October 2002) is an Afghan-Irish cricketer who plays for Leinster Lightning. Originally from Afghanistan, Sherzad played for the Ireland under-19 cricket team at the 2022 ICC Under-19 Cricket World Cup in the West Indies.

== Early life ==
Originally from Jalalabad in Afghanistan, Sherzad played tape ball cricket in the streets. In 2017, his mother paid for him to travel around 8,300 km (5,200 mi) to get to Ireland so he could work with his uncle. The journey took the best part of nine months, with him crossing through Pakistan, Iran, Turkey, Bulgaria, Serbia, Croatia, Italy and France with other immigrants. While in Croatia, he got into a truck to get to Milan, Italy. From Cherbourg in Northern France, he got into another truck to get onto a ferry. When he arrived in Dublin, he was forced to sleep in a park overnight, as he did not know where his uncle lived. After getting to a refugee centre, Sherzad was placed with a family via an agency, until they located his uncle in Tipperary.

== Cricket career ==
In 2019, Sherzad saw an advert by Cricket Ireland looking for fast bowlers in a talent programme, which he signed up to through Facebook. Albert van der Merwe, the talent pathway manager for Cricket Ireland, was impressed by Sherzad's bowling, and invited him back for further sessions. Van der Merwe was unaware of Sherzad's story, but got to know it once he had joined the academy.

In December 2021, Sherzad was named in Ireland's 15-man squad for the 2022 ICC Under-19 Cricket World Cup. On 29 January 2022, in the Plate semi-final against Zimbabwe, Sherzad took a five-wicket haul, with five wickets for twenty runs. Ireland won the match by eight wickets, to advance to the Plate Final against the United Arab Emirates. During the match, at the Queen's Park Oval in Port of Spain, a 5.1 magnitude earthquake struck during Zimbabwe's innings.

In May 2022, Sherzad was named in Leinster Lightning's squad for the opening match of the 2022 Inter-Provincial Cup, against the North West Warriors at Sydney Parade in Dublin. He made his List A debut in the match, where he bowled three overs, but did not take a wicket.
