= Rajvardhan Hangargekar =

Indian cricketer (born 2002)

Personal information
- Full name: Rajvardhan S Hangargekar
- Born: 10 November 2002 (age 24); Tuljapur, Maharashtra, India
- Batting: Right-handed
- Bowling: Right-arm fast
- Role: All-rounder

Domestic team information
- Years: Team
- 2021–present: Maharashtra
- 2023: Chennai Super Kings
- 2025: Lucknow Super Giants

Career statistics
| Competition | FC | LA | T20 |
|---|---|---|---|
| Matches | 5 | 24 | 16 |
| Runs scored | 18 | 96 | 28 |
| Batting average | 3.00 | 12.00 | 9.33 |
| 100s/50s | 0/0 | 0/0 | 0/0 |
| Top score | 5 | 24 | 11 |
| Balls bowled | 821 | 1047 | 288 |
| Wickets | 13 | 41 | 14 |
| Bowling average | 42.46 | 24.68 | 30.85 |
| 5 wickets in innings | 0 | 2 | 0 |
| 10 wickets in match | 0 | – | – |
| Best bowling | 3/58 | 5/42 | 3/36 |
| Catches/stumpings | 1/– | 2/– | 4/– |
- Source: Cricinfo, 15 March 2025

Rajvardhan Hangargekar (born 10 November 2002) is an Indian cricketer. He plays for Maharashtra in domestic cricket and Lucknow Super Giants in the Indian Premier League.

He made his Twenty20 debut on 16 January 2021, for Maharashtra in the 2020–21 Syed Mushtaq Ali Trophy. He made his List A debut on 21 February 2021, for Maharashtra in the 2020–21 Vijay Hazare Trophy. In December 2021, he was named in India's team for the 2022 ICC Under-19 Cricket World Cup in the West Indies.

In February 2022, he was bought by the Chennai Super Kings in the auction for the 2022 Indian Premier League tournament.

On 31 March 2023, he made his IPL debut for Chennai Super Kings in the 2023 Indian Premier League.

On 19 July 2023, in the 2023 ACC Emerging Teams Asia Cup match against Pakistan A cricket team Hangargekar picked up 5 wickets conceding only 42 runs guiding India A cricket team to a resounding victory.
