= SM Meherob =

Bangladeshi cricketer (born 2003)

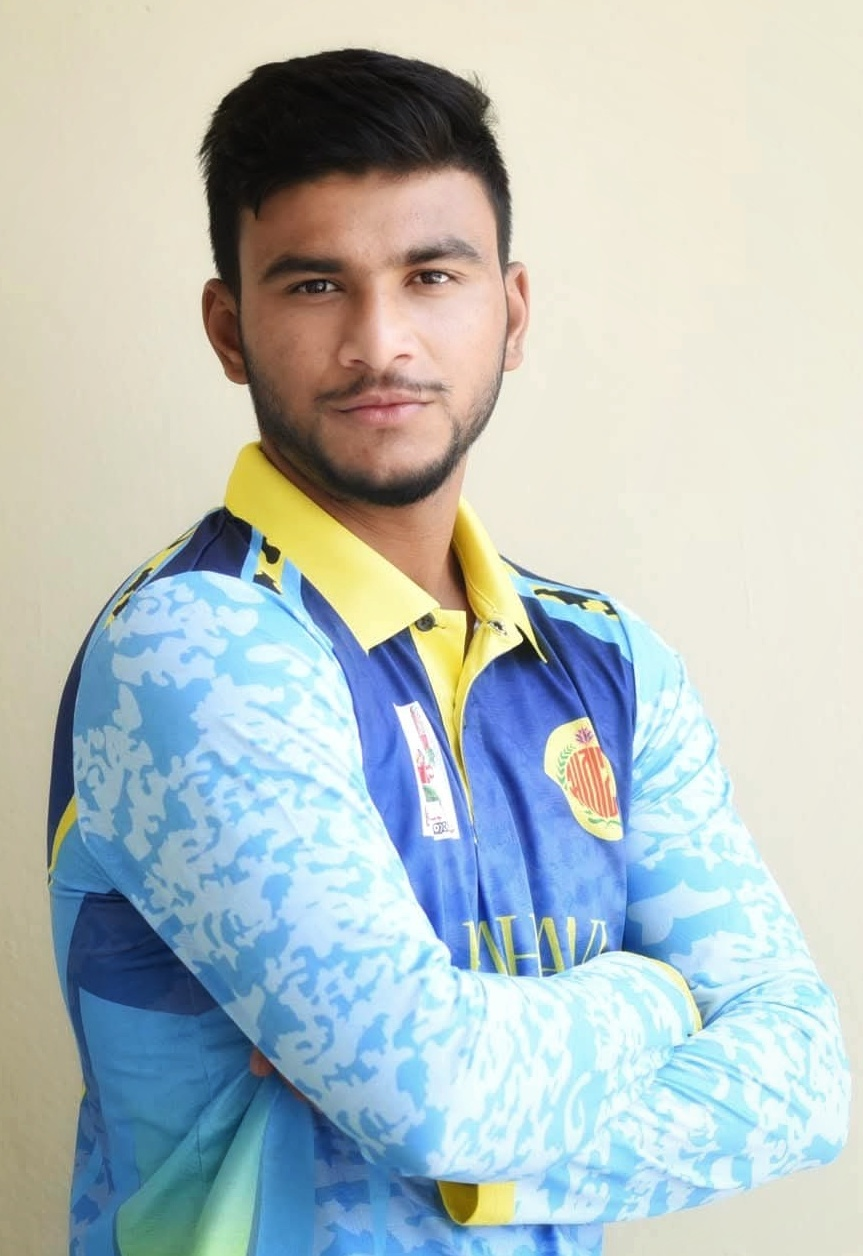

Personal information
- Born: 30 July 2003 (age 23); Rajshahi, Bangladesh
- Batting: Left-handed
- Bowling: Right-arm off break
- Role: All Rounder

Career statistics
| Competition | FC | LA | T20 |
|---|---|---|---|
| Matches | 18 | 53 | 34 |
| Runs scored | 730 | 1,150 | 283 |
| Batting average | 26.07 | 29.48 | 14.89 |
| 100s/50s | 0/5 | 0/7 | 0/0 |
| Top score | 66* | 77 | 48* |
| Balls bowled | 1,069 | 1,084 | 460 |
| Wickets | 22 | 27 | 24 |
| Bowling average | 25.95 | 33.00 | 22.79 |
| 5 wickets in innings | 1 | 0 | 0 |
| 10 wickets in match | 0 | 0 | 0 |
| Best bowling | 6/35 | 3/10 | 4/15 |
| Catches/stumpings | 17/- | 23/- | 18/- |
Medal record
Men's Cricket
Representing Bangladesh
ICC U-19 World Cup
| Winner | 2020 South Africa |
- Source: ESPNcricinfo, 4 June 2026

SM Meherob Hasan (born 30 July 2003) is a Bangladeshi cricketer. He made his List A debut for Gazi Group Cricketers in the 2021–22 Dhaka Premier Division Cricket League on 28 March 2022. Prior to his List A debut, he was named in Bangladesh's squad for the 2022 ICC Under-19 Cricket World Cup. He made his first-class debut on 10 October 2022, for Rajshahi Division in the 2022–23 National Cricket League.
