= Raj Angad Bawa =

Indian cricketer (born 2002)

Personal information
- Full name: Raj Angad Bawa
- Born: 12 November 2002 (age 24); Nahan, Himachal Pradesh, India
- Batting: Left-handed
- Bowling: Right-arm medium-fast
- Relatives: Trilochan Singh (grandfather)

Domestic team information
- Years: Team
- 2021/22–present: Chandigarh
- 2022: Punjab Kings
- 2025: Mumbai Indians
- FC debut: 17 February 2022 Chandigarh v Hyderabad

Career statistics
Competition	FC	LA	T20
Matches	11	11	20
Runs scored	633	162	308
Batting average	42.20	20.25	23.69
100s/50s	1/2	0/0	0/1
Top score	146	36	61
Balls bowled	1,104	253	313
Wickets	13	12	22
Bowling average	48.46	18.66	20.40
5 wickets in innings	0	0	0
10 wickets in match	0	0	0
Best bowling	3/22	4/11	3/28
Catches/stumpings	3/–	2/	8/–
Medal record
Men's Cricket
Representing India
ICC Under-19 Cricket World Cup
Winner	2022 West Indies
ACC U19 Asia Cup
Winner	2021 UAE
- Source: ESPNcricinfo, 2 March 2025

Raj Angad Bawa (born 12 November 2002) is an Indian cricketer. He made his first-class cricket debut for Chandigarh in February 2022 in the 2021–22 Ranji Trophy, taking a wicket with his first delivery. He has played for the India national under-19 cricket team, including at the 2022 ICC Under-19 Cricket World Cup and 2021 ACC Under-19 Asia Cup. He is in the Mumbai Indians IPL team

== Early life ==
Raj Bawa was born in Nahan, Himachal Pradesh and grew up in Chandigarh. He is the grandson of Trilochan Singh Bawa, a member of the Olympic gold-winning Indian hockey team at the London 1948 Games.

== Career ==
Bawa played under-19 cricket for Chandigarh. He made his first-class debut on 17 February 2022 against Hyderabad in the Ranji Trophy, taking a wicket with his first delivery. Before making his senior debut, Bawa was bought by Punjab Kings in the 2022 IPL auction ahead of the 2022 Indian Premier League. He made his Twenty20 debut on 27 March 2022, for Punjab Kings in the 2022 Indian Premier League.
