= Josh Boyden =

English cricketer (born 2004)

Joshua Boyden
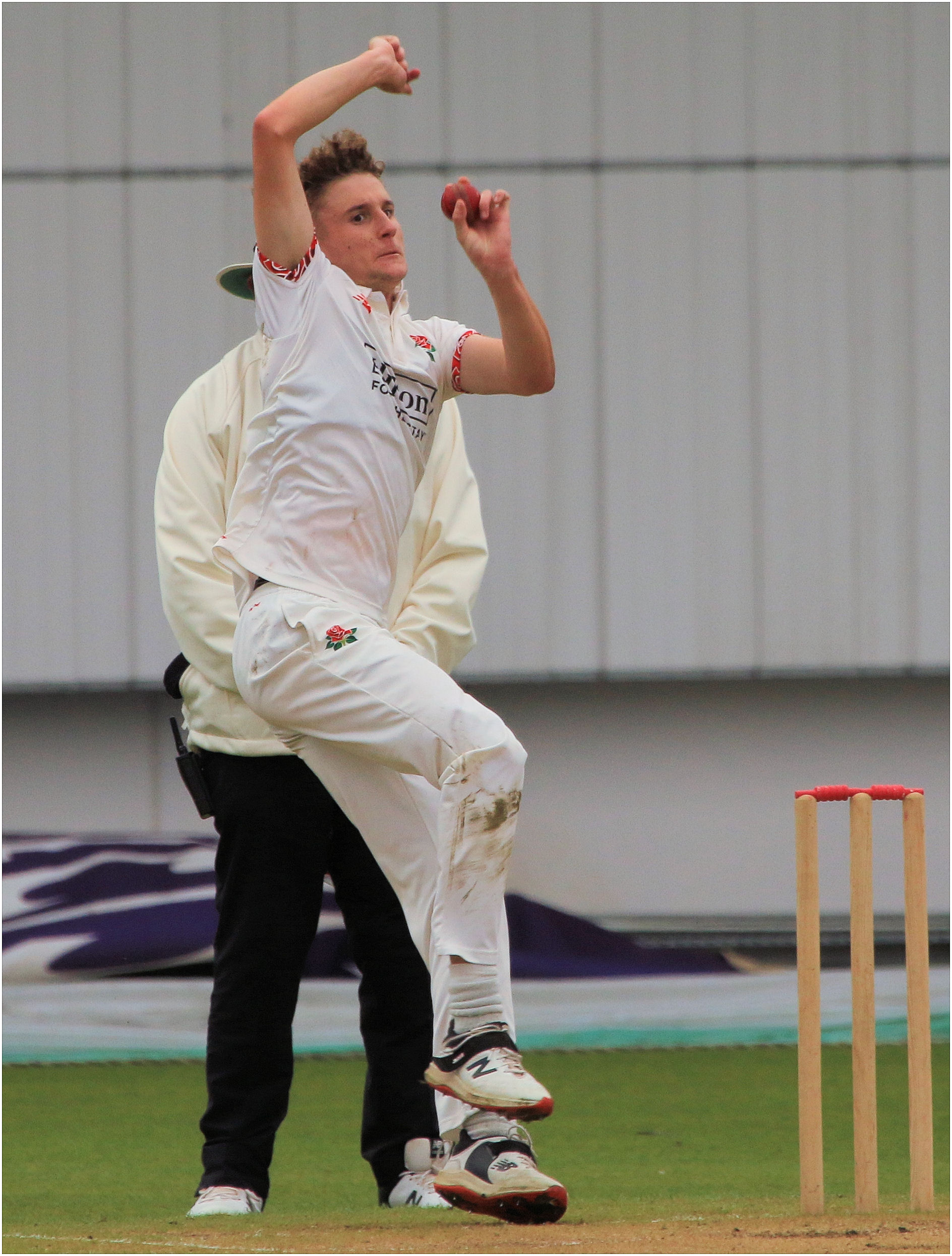
- Boyden in 2024

Personal information
- Full name: Joshua Ashton Boyden
- Born: 16 April 2004 (age 22); Chorley, England
- Batting: Left-handed
- Bowling: Left-arm medium

Domestic team information
- Years: Team
- 2024: Lancashire (squad no. 27)
- First-class debut: 22 August 2024 Lancashire v Surrey
- List A debut: 8 August 2024 Lancashire v Middlesex

Career statistics
Competition	First-class	List A
Matches	1	3
Runs scored	5	47
Batting average	2.50	47.00
100s/50s	0/0	0/0
Top score	5	44
Balls bowled	108	120
Wickets	0	6
Bowling average	–	18.33
5 wickets in innings	–	0
10 wickets in match	–	0
Best bowling	–	2/26
Catches/stumpings	0/–	0/–
- Source: ESPNcricinfo, 29 September 2024

Joshua Ashton Boyden (born 16 April 2004) is an English cricketer who previously played for Lancashire and the England national under-19 cricket team. He is a left handed batsman and left arm medium fast bowler. In July 2022, he signed a professional contract with Lancashire County Cricket Club, he left the club in October 2025.

== Early life ==
Boyden rose through the age groups at his local Euxton Cricket Club. From 2021 to 2022, he played for Wigan Cricket Club.

== International career ==
In the run up to the 2022 Under-19 Men's Cricket World Cup final, Boyden finished with 15 wickets for England and was named in the International Cricket Council's (ICC) team of the tournament.

== Professional career ==
Boyden made his List A debut for Lancashire against Middlesex on 8 August 2024, in the 2024 One-Day Cup. He made his first-class debut for Lancashire against Surrey on 22 August 2024, in the 2024 County Championship.

In October 2025 he left Lancashire.
