= Teague Wyllie =

Australian cricketer

Personal information
- Born: 24 April 2004 (age 22)
- Batting: Right-handed
- Role: Batter
- Relatives: Georgia Wyllie (sister)

Domestic team information
- Years: Team
- 2022/23–2025/26: Western Australia
- 2026/27–present: Tasmania

Career statistics
Competition	First-class	List A
Matches	26	3
Runs scored	858	98
Batting average	19.95	98.00
100s/50s	1/2	0/1
Top score	104	56
Catches/stumpings	19/–	2/–
- Source: Cricinfo, 23 October 2026

Teague Wyllie (born 24 April 2004) is an Australian cricketer who plays for Tasmania. Wyllie has played for the Australia under-19 cricket team, as well as for Western Australia prior to moving to Tasmania.

== Career ==
In early December 2021, Wyllie was named in Australia's training squad of 37 players for the 2022 ICC Under-19 Cricket World Cup. Later the same month, Wyllie was selected in Australia's final squad of fifteen players for the U19 Cricket World Cup. Wyllie played in all six of Australia's matches, finishing the tournament as the team's leading run-scorer, with 278 runs. In Australia's first group match, against the West Indies, Wyllie top-scored in the match with an unbeaten 86 runs. In Australia's third match, against Scotland, Wyllie was again the top-scorer in the match, scoring 101 not out. Following the conclusion of the tournament, the International Cricket Council (ICC) named Wyllie in their most valuable team of the tournament, the only Australian in the squad.

Wyllie made his first-class debut on 23 March 2022, for Western Australia in the penultimate match of the 2021–22 Sheffield Shield season, where he scored 42 runs in the first innings. He became the youngest cricketer to make his first-class debut for Western Australia since Cameron Green made his debut in February 2017. Western Australia made the final of the Sheffield Shield, with Wyllie playing in the match, with Western Australia winning the tournament.

On 4 October 2022, he scored his maiden century in first class cricket, helping his team to defeat New South Wales by 8 wickets in the opening match of the 2022–23 Sheffield Shield season.

Wyllie was delisted by Western Australia at the end of the 2025–26 season, however was recruited by Tasmania.
