= Awais Ali =

Pakistani cricketer (born 2005)

Awais Ali اویس علی
Personal information
- Full name: Awais Ali
- Born: 29 December 2005 (age 20); Gujranwala, Punjab, Pakistan
- Batting: Right-handed
- Bowling: Right-arm medium-fast
- Role: Bowler

Domestic team information
- Years: Team
- 2021/22: Central Punjab

Career statistics
Competition	LA
Matches	2
Runs scored	0
Batting average	–
100s/50s	0/0
Top score	0*
Balls bowled	51
Wickets	0
Bowling average	–
5 wickets in innings	0
10 wickets in match	0
Best bowling	0/34
Catches/stumpings	1/–
- Source: Cricinfo, 23 September 2022

Awais Ali (Punjabi: اویس علی) (born 29 December 2005 in Gujranwala, Punjab) is a Pakistani cricketer who plays for Central Punjab. Ali made his List A debut for Central Punjab against Southern Punjab during the 2021-22 Pakistan Cup on 6 March 2022. Ali played for the Pakistan national under-19 cricket team during the 2022 ICC Under-19 Cricket World Cup. Ali was later included in the team of the tournament of the 2022 Under-19 World Cup.
