= Nivethan Radhakrishnan =

Australian cricketer

Personal information
- Born: 25 November 2002 (age 23); Chennai, Tamil Nadu, India
- Nickname: Nivvi
- Batting: Left-handed
- Bowling: Left-arm/right-arm finger spin
- Role: All-rounder

Career statistics
| Competition | FC | LA |
|---|---|---|
| Matches | 11 | 2 |
| Runs scored | 409 | 1 |
| Batting average | 18.59 | 0.50 |
| 100s/50s | 0/2 | 0/0 |
| Top score | 68 | 1 |
| Balls bowled | 518 | 96 |
| Wickets | 5 | 3 |
| Bowling average | 68.40 | 31.00 |
| 5 wickets in innings | 0 | 0 |
| 10 wickets in match | 0 | 0 |
| Best bowling | 1/3 | 2/61 |
| Catches/stumpings | 5/– | 2/– |
- Source: ESPNcricinfo, 23 October 2026

Nivethan Radhakrishnan (born 25 November 2002) is an Australian cricketer. He is an all-rounder who bats left-handed and possesses the ability to bowl both right-arm and left-arm spin.

== Personal life ==
Radhakrishnan was born in Chennai, Tamil Nadu, India. He moved to Sydney, New South Wales, Australia, in 2013 at the age of 10, with his father, mother and older brother. He has cited West Indies all-rounder Sir Garfield Sobers as his idol.

== Cricket career ==
Radhakrishnan spent the 2017 and 2018 Tamil Nadu Premier League seasons with Karaikudi Kaalai and Dindigul Dragons, respectively. In 2019, he played for an Australian Under-16 team in Dubai against Pakistan. In 2020, he was one of the four cricketers to win the Bill O'Reilly Medal and also received the Basil Sellers Scholarship. In 2021, he was a net bowler for the Indian Premier League franchise, the Delhi Capitals. In the same year, he earned his first professional contract with the Tasmanian Tigers.

In December 2021, he was named in Australia's team for the 2022 ICC Under-19 Cricket World Cup in the West Indies. He made his first-class debut on 18 February 2022, for Tasmania in the 2021–22 Sheffield Shield season.
