= Bilal Ahmad =

Afghan cricketer (born 2004)

Personal information
- Full name: Bilal Ahmad Tarin
- Born: 21 July 2004 (age 22); Kandahar, Afghanistan
- Batting: Right-handed
- Bowling: Right arm medium-fast
- Source: Cricinfo, 9 March 2019

Bilal Ahmad (born 21 July 2004) is an Afghan cricketer. He made his first-class debut for Kandahar Province in the 2018–19 Mirwais Nika Provincial 3-Day tournament on 7 March 2019. He made his List A debut for Kandahar Province in the 2019 Afghanistan Provincial Challenge Cup tournament on 5 August 2019. In December 2021, he was named in Afghanistan's team for the 2022 ICC Under-19 Cricket World Cup in the West Indies.
