= Tom Prest =

English cricketer (born 2003)

Personal information
- Full name: Thomas James Prest
- Born: 24 March 2003 (age 23); Wimborne, Dorset, England
- Batting: Right-handed
- Bowling: Right-arm off break
- Role: Batsman

Domestic team information
- Years: Team
- 2021–present: Hampshire (squad no. 24)
- First-class debut: 6 July 2021 Hampshire v Surrey
- List A debut: 22 July 2021 Hampshire v Essex

Career statistics
Competition	FC	LA	T20
Matches	41	53	50
Runs scored	1,740	1,468	881
Batting average	28.52	29.95	19.15
100s/50s	4/5	3/9	0/5
Top score	156	181	64
Balls bowled	680	734	36
Wickets	8	21	2
Bowling average	60.00	32.80	21.50
5 wickets in innings	0	0	0
10 wickets in match	0	0	0
Best bowling	2/32	4/73	1/8
Catches/stumpings	29/–	20/–	15/–
- Source: Cricinfo, 26 September 2026

Thomas James Prest (born 24 March 2003) is an English cricketer. He made his Twenty20 debut on 25 June 2021, for Hampshire in the 2021 T20 Blast. Prior to his Twenty20 debut, Prest scored a triple century for the Second XI team in May 2021. On 6 July 2021, he made his first-class debut, for Hampshire in the 2021 County Championship, as a replacement player for James Vince. He made his List A debut on 22 July 2021, for Hampshire in the 2021 Royal London One-Day Cup.

In December 2021, he was named as the captain of England's team for the 2022 ICC Under-19 Cricket World Cup in the West Indies.

In August 2022, he scored 181 from 138 balls against Kent in the 2022 Royal London One-Day Cup.
