= Malsha Tharupathi =

Sri Lankan cricketer

Personal information
- Born: 7 November 2004 (age 22); Madampe, Sri Lanka
- Batting: Right-handed
- Bowling: legbreak

Domestic team information
- Years: Team
- 2022-present: Saracens Sports Club
- 2024–present: Galle Marvels

Career statistics
Competition	FC	LA	T20
Matches	1	12	24
Runs scored	0	74	104
Batting average	0.00	12.33	13.00
100s/50s	0/0	0/0	0/0
Top score	0	32*	36*
Balls bowled	31	353	347
Wickets	4	12	28
Bowling average	6.25	25.75	13.78
5 wickets in innings	0	0	0
10 wickets in match	0	0	0
Best bowling	4/25	4/42	4/12
Catches/stumpings	0/–	0/–	11/–
- Source: Cricinfo, 1 April 2025

Malsha Tharupathi (born 7 November 2004) is a Sri Lankan cricketer.

== Biography ==
He initially studied at Madampe Madya Maha Vidyalaya. He then switched to Richmond College, Galle where he furthered his cricketing ambitions. He took nine wickets in his first cricket match for Richmond College during an Under-19 schools cricket division match against the Prince of Wales' College, Moratuwa.

== Career ==
In January 2022, he was named in Sri Lanka's squad for the 2022 ICC Under-19 Cricket World Cup in the West Indies.

He made his T20 debut playing for Saracens Sports Club against Sri Lanka Air Force Sports Club on 22 May 2022 at the Major Clubs T20 Tournament. He made his List A debut playing for Saracens Sports Club against Singhalese Sports Club on 27 June 2022 at the Major Clubs Limited Over Tournament.

He was bought by B-Love Kandy in the LPL auction for US$13,000 ahead of the 2023 Lanka Premier League. He was named in Sri Lankan squad for the 2023 ACC Under-19 Asia Cup which was held in the United Arab Emirates.
