= Kai Smith =

UAE cricket player

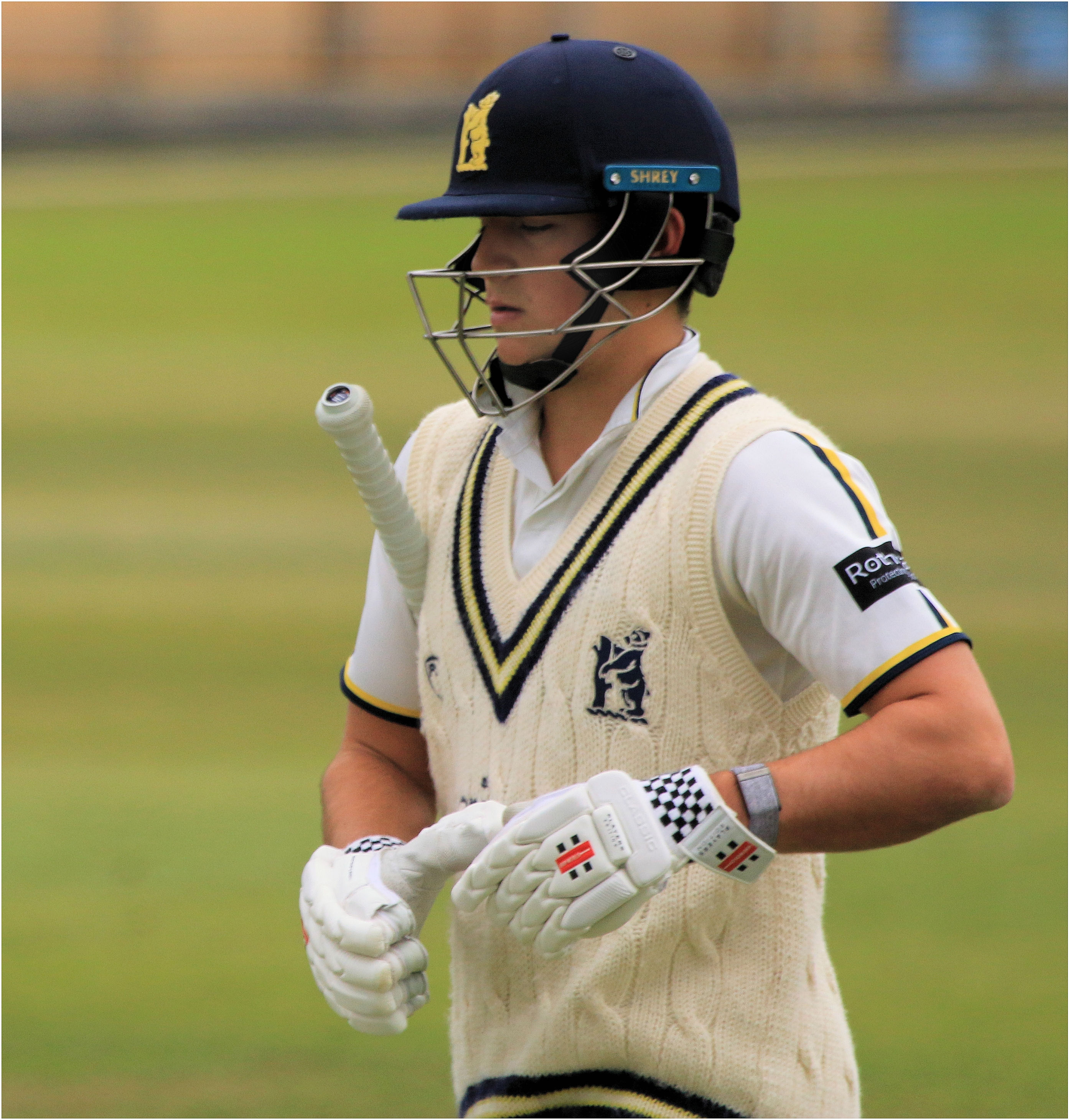
- Smith in 2025

Personal information
- Born: 28 November 2004 (age 21); Dubai, United Arab Emirates
- Batting: Right-handed
- Role: Wicket-keeper batsman

Domestic team information
- Years: Team
- 2022–present: Warwickshire (squad no. 11)
- First-class debut: 4 April 2025 Warwickshire v Sussex
- List A debut: 2 August 2022 Warwickshire v Gloucestershire

Career statistics
Competition	FC	LA	T20
Matches	16	39	18
Runs scored	620	834	173
Batting average	34.44	34.75	24.71
100s/50s	0/5	1/3	0/1
Top score	79	130*	65*
Catches/stumpings	38/2	22/1	6/0
- Source: ESPNcricinfo, 26 September 2026

Kai Smith (born 28 November 2004) is a professional cricketer who has played for Warwickshire County Cricket Club and the United Arab Emirates national under-19 cricket team. He is a right-handed wicket-keeper batsman.

== Personal life ==
Smith was born and raised in Dubai to South African parents. He attended Nord Anglia International School Dubai before moving to boarding school in Kent to complete his A-levels.

== Career ==
=== UAE ===
Smith represented the UAE at the 2020 Under-19 Cricket World Cup in South Africa at the age of 15. He returned to the UAE squad for the 2022 Under-19 Cricket World Cup in the West Indies. He scored 145 runs against Papua New Guinea in a warm-up match.

Smith played for the Rawalpindi Raiders in the 2022 Pakistan Junior League.

=== England ===
Smith was introduced to the Warwickshire County Cricket Club system by Dougie Brown, a former UAE coach. He was selected for the English Schools Cricket Association to play against the Marylebone Cricket Club (MCC) in September 2021. Smith made his List A debut for Warwickshire against Gloucestershire in the 2022 Royal London One-Day Cup in August 2022. Smith signed a new two-year contract with Warwickshire in July 2025.
