= Raveen de Silva =

Sri Lankan cricketer (born 2002)

Personal information
- Full name: Kaluappu Handidige Raveen Achintha de Silva
- Born: 18 October 2002 (age 24)

Domestic team information
- Years: Team
- 2021/22: Tamil Union Cricket and Athletic Club
- Source: Cricinfo, 14 November 2021

Raveen de Silva (born 18 October 2002) is a Sri Lankan cricketer who has played for the Sri Lanka national under-19 cricket team. He made his List A debut on 14 November 2021, for Tamil Union Cricket and Athletic Club in the 2021–22 Major Clubs Limited Over Tournament. In January 2022, he was named as the vice-captain of Sri Lanka's team for the 2022 ICC Under-19 Cricket World Cup in the West Indies. He made his Twenty20 debut on 23 May 2022, for Tamil Union Cricket and Athletic Club in the Major Clubs T20 Tournament.

Raveen had his education at Nalanda College, Colombo and captained the Nalanda first XI cricket team in 2022. He is also the captain of Sri Lanka National under 19 team.
