= Sadisha Rajapaksa =

Sri Lankan cricketer

Personal information
- Born: 30 June 2003 (age 23); Colombo, Sri Lanka

Domestic team information
- Years: Team
- 2024: Galle Marvels
- Source: , 13 June 2024

Sadisha Rajapaksa is a Sri Lankan cricketer. He currently plays for the Galle Marvels in the Lanka Premier League and the Singhalese Sports Club in the Major League Tournament. He has also played for the Sri Lanka Under-19 Cricket Team.

== Personal life ==
Sadisha graduated from Royal College in Colombo. He also was crowned as ThePapare Most Popular Schoolboy Cricketer 2021 during his time at the Royal College.
