= Suliman Safi =

Afghan cricketer (born 2003)

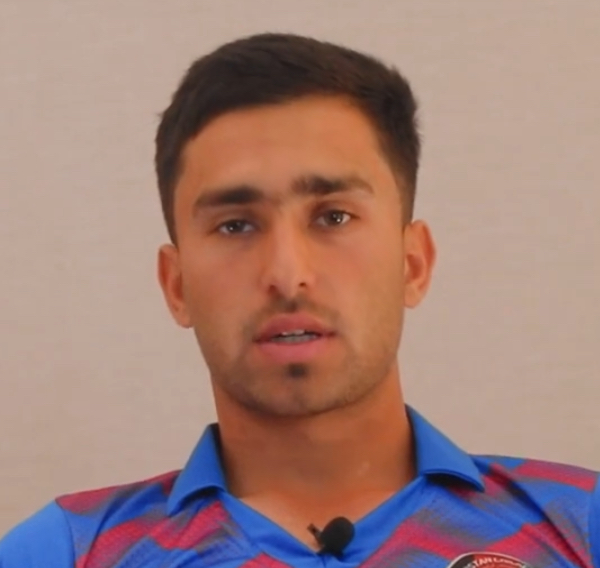
- Safi in 2021

Personal information
- Full name: Suliman Safi Khan
- Born: 17 March 2003 (age 23)
- Batting: Left-handed
- Bowling: Right-arm off break
- Role: Batter

Domestic team information
- Years: Team
- 2019–2022: Band-e-Amir Region
- 2025: Munster Reds

Career statistics
Competition	FC	LA	T20
Matches	11	6	11
Runs scored	606	362	84
Batting average	37.87	60.33	8.40
100s/50s	1/3	1/3	0/0
Top score	101*	131	26
Catches/stumpings	6/–	1/–	5/–
- Source: Cricinfo, 1 February 2026

Suliman Safi Khan (born 17 March 2003) is an Afghan cricketer. He made his first-class debut for Kabul Province in the 2018–19 Mirwais Nika Provincial 3-Day tournament on 15 February 2019. He made his List A debut for Band-e-Amir Region in the 2019 Ghazi Amanullah Khan Regional One Day Tournament on 17 September 2019. In December 2021, he was named as the captain of Afghanistan's team for the 2022 ICC Under-19 Cricket World Cup in the West Indies.
