= Allah Noor =

Afghan cricketer (born 2003)

Personal information
- Born: 22 April 2003 (age 23); Kabul, Afghanistan
- Role: All-Rounder
- Source: Cricinfo, 4 August 2019

Allah Noor (born 22 April 2003) is an Afghan cricketer. He made his List A debut for Nangarhar Province in the 2019 Afghanistan Provincial Challenge Cup tournament on 4 August 2019. In December 2021, he was named in Afghanistan's team for the 2022 ICC Under-19 Cricket World Cup in the West Indies.
