= Zeeshan Zameer =

Pakistani cricketer (born 2002)

Personal information
- Full name: Syed Zeeshan Zameer
- Born: 20 December 2002 (age 23); Karachi, Sindh, Pakistan
- Height: 6 ft (183 cm)
- Batting: Right-handed
- Bowling: Right-arm fast-medium
- Role: Bowling all-rounder

Domestic team information
- Years: Team
- 2022–present: Islamabad United
- Source: Cricinfo, 16 April 2022

Syed Zeeshan Zameer (born 20 December 2002) is a Pakistani cricketer.

== Early life ==
He was born in Karachi into a Pashtun family to a father who worked as a delivery driver for a local beverage company, living with a large family of 28 with all of them residing in a single house in Nazimabad.

== Early career ==
Zameer was selected for the Karachi Under-16s but due to injury was out of the game for some time before being included in Sindh Under-19s in 2019.

== Domestic career ==
Zeeshan made his Twenty20 debut on 11 February 2022, for Islamabad United in the 2022 Pakistan Super League. He played for the Pakistan under-19 team in the 2021 ACC Under-19 Asia Cup, where he was the highest wicket-taker, with 11 scalps.
