= Haseebullah Khan =

Pakistani cricketer

Personal information
- Born: 20 March 2003 (age 23); Pishin, Balochistan, Pakistan
- Height: 5 ft 9 in (175 cm)
- Batting: Left-handed
- Role: Wicket-keeper

International information
- National side: Pakistan (2024–present)
- ODI debut (cap 247): 22 November 2024 v Zimbabwe
- Last ODI: 16 November 2025 v Sri Lanka
- ODI shirt no.: 53
- T20I debut (cap 113): 21 January 2024 v New Zealand
- Last T20I: 18 November 2024 v Australia
- T20I shirt no.: 53

Domestic team information
- Years: Team
- 2022-2023: Balochistan
- 2023-2024: Peshawar Zalmi (squad no. 13)
- 2023–present: Multan
- 2025: Quetta Gladiators

Career statistics
Competition	ODI	T20I	FC	LA
Matches	1	3	24	51
Runs scored	0	36	1099	2301
Batting average	0.00	12.00	37.89	51.13
100s/50s	0/0	0/0	4/5	9/10
Top score	0	24	117	142
Catches/stumpings	1/0	1/0	61/2	33/3
- Source: ESPNcricinfo, 21 November 2024

Haseebullah Khan (Urdu: حسیب اللہ خان; born 20 March 2003) is a Pakistani cricketer who plays for Balochistan in domestic cricket and for Peshawar Zalmi in the Pakistan Super League.

== Early life ==
Born in Pishin, a city around 50 kilometers away from Balochistan’s provincial capital Quetta, Haseebullah belongs to a cricketing family, as his father Azizullah and his uncle Hameedullah were both first-class cricketers.

== Domestic career ==
In December 2021, Khan was called up to the Pakistan Under-19 cricket team for the 2022 Under-19 World Cup. He was later named in the Under-19 World Cup team of the tournament.

In March 2022, he made his List A debut for Balochistan in the 2021–22 Pakistan Cup against Northern. In the semi-finals of the tournament, Khan's century (131) against Sindh was instrumental in taking his team to the final. He was adjudged player-of-the-match for that knock. Balochistan won the tournament, with Khan being the leading run-scorer in the competition.

In September 2022, he made his first-class debut for Balochistan in the 2022–23 Quaid-e-Azam Trophy against Khyber Pakhtunkhwa.

In March 2023, he made his PSL debut for Peshawar Zalmi and scored a half-century.

== International career ==
In December 2022, alongside Saim Ayub and Ihsanullah, Khan was one of the three youngsters selected to share a dressing room with the national squad for the second Test match of the New Zealand series. He made his T20I debut on 21 January 2024 in the fifth match of the T20I series against New Zealand.
