= Izharulhaq Naveed =

Afghan cricketer (born 2003)

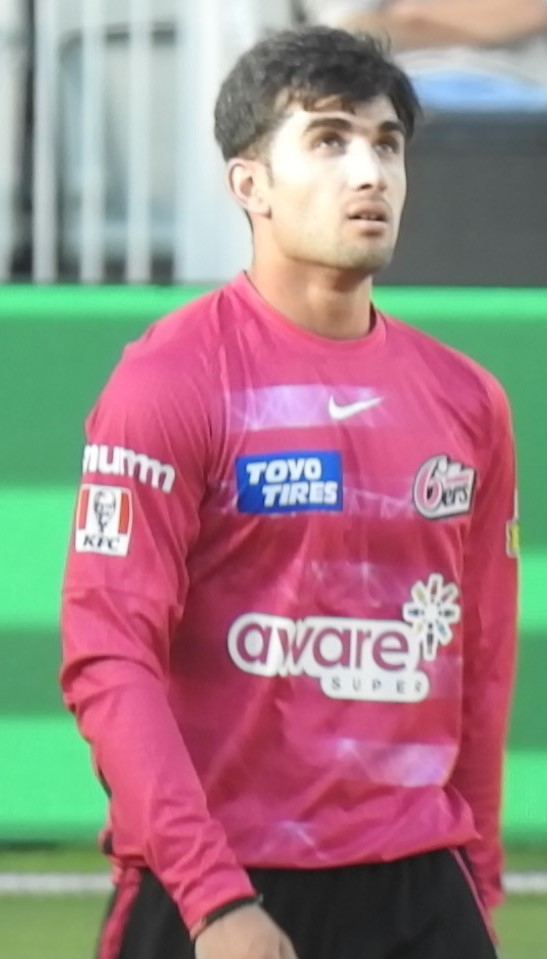
- Naveed playing for Sydney Sixers, January 2023

Personal information
- Born: 10 November 2003 (age 23); Kabul, Afghanistan
- Batting: Right-handed
- Bowling: Right-arm leg spin
- Role: Bowler

Domestic team information
- Years: Team
- 2019: Kabul
- 2019/20–present: Band-e-Amir
- 2022: Speenghar
- 2022/23: Sydney Sixers (squad no. 99)
- 2023: Multan Sultans (squad no. 100)
- 2023: St Kitts & Nevis Patriots

Career statistics
Competition	FC	LA	T20
Matches	3	7	14
Runs scored	13	1	5
Batting average	3.25	1.00	-
100s/50s	0/0	0/0	0/0
Top score	13	1*	2*
Balls bowled	354	378	291
Wickets	8	8	17
Bowling average	27.12	31.12	19.29
5 wickets in innings	0	0	0
10 wickets in match	0	0	0
Best bowling	3/39	2/15	4/23
Catches/stumpings	1/–	2/–	3/–
- Source: ESPNcricinfo, 30 December 2022

Izharulhaq Naveed (born 10 November 2003) is an Afghan cricketer. He made his List A debut for Kabul Province in the 2019 Afghanistan Provincial Challenge Cup tournament on 31 July 2019.

== International career ==
In June 2023, he was received his first international call-up in Afghanistan's Test squad for their series against Bangladesh. In same month, he was named in One Day International (ODI) squad for the series against Bangladesh.
