= 2022 Under-19 Cricket World Cup =

Cricket tournament

2022 ICC Under-19 Men's Cricket World Cup
- Tournament logo
- Dates: 14 January – 5 February 2022
- Administrator: International Cricket Council (ICC)
- Cricket format: Limited-overs (50 overs)
- Tournament format(s): Round-robin and knockout
- Host: West Indies
- Champions: India (5th title)
- Runners-up: England
- Participants: 16
- Matches: 48 (Note: 48 matches were scheduled, but two of Canada's matches were cancelled due to COVID-19.)
- Player of the series: (South Africa) Dewald Brevis
- Most runs: (South Africa) Dewald Brevis (506)
- Most wickets: (Sri Lanka) Dunith Wellalage (17)
- Official website: Official website

The 2022 ICC Under-19 Cricket World Cup was an international limited-overs cricket tournament that was held in the West Indies in January and February 2022 with sixteen teams taking part. It was the fourteenth edition of the Under-19 Men's Cricket World Cup, and the first that was held in the West Indies. Bangladesh were the defending champions.

In March 2021, Cricket West Indies confirmed that the format would be the same as previous editions, with teams competing to progress to the Plate and Super League phases of the tournament. In November 2021, the International Cricket Council (ICC) confirmed the full schedule for the tournament, with matches played in Antigua and Barbuda, Guyana, Saint Kitts and Nevis, and Trinidad; the final was played at Sir Vivian Richards Stadium in Antigua and Barbuda. New Zealand decided to withdraw from the tournament due to the COVID-19-related extensive mandatory quarantine restrictions for minors on their return home and Scotland were named as their replacement.

England became the first team to reach the final of the tournament, after they beat Afghanistan by 15 runs in the first Super League semi-final match. It was the first time that England had reached the final of the Under-19 Cricket World cup since winning the 1998 tournament in South Africa. In the second semi-final, India beat Australia by 96 runs, progressing to their fourth consecutive Under-19 Cricket World Cup final.

Australia beat Afghanistan in the final playoff match of the tournament to finish in third place. In the final, India beat England by four wickets to win their fifth Under-19 Cricket World Cup. Dewald Brevis of South Africa was named the Player of the Tournament, after scoring 506 runs.

== Qualification ==
The top eleven teams from the previous tournament qualified automatically. They were joined by the five winners of regional qualification tournaments. In August 2021, the International Cricket Council (ICC) announced that the Americas, Asia, and East Asia Pacific regional qualifiers had all been cancelled due to the COVID-19 pandemic. As a result, Canada, the United Arab Emirates and Papua New Guinea all qualified directly to the 2022 Under-19 Cricket World Cup based on their past performances in the last five regional qualifiers. In the African group, Uganda won the Division 1 tournament to become the final team to qualify. In the European group, Ireland beat Scotland in the regional final to qualify. However, in November 2021, the ICC confirmed that Scotland won a wildcard and replaced New Zealand in the tournament, after the country was forced to withdraw due to the extensive mandatory quarantine restrictions placed on the return of minors due to the COVID-19 pandemic.

Team	Mode of Qualification
West Indies	Host nation
Afghanistan	Previous tournament
Australia	Previous tournament
Bangladesh	Previous tournament
England	Previous tournament
India	Previous tournament
~~New Zealand~~	Previous tournament (later withdrew)
Pakistan	Previous tournament
South Africa	Previous tournament
Sri Lanka	Previous tournament
Zimbabwe	Previous tournament
Canada	Advanced from Regional Qualification
Ireland	Advanced from Regional Qualification
Papua New Guinea	Advanced from Regional Qualification
Uganda	Advanced from Regional Qualification
United Arab Emirates	Advanced from Regional Qualification
Scotland	Replaced New Zealand

== Umpires ==
On 9 January 2022, the ICC appointed the officials for the tournament. Along with the nineteen umpires, Denavon Hayles, Graeme Labrooy and Phil Whitticase were also named as the match referees.

- Rizwan Akram
- Rahul Asher
- Sameer Bandekar
- Nitin Bathi
- Roland Black
- Emmerson Carington
- Allan Haggo
- Mark Jameson
- Heath Kearns
- Arnold Maddela
- Vijaya Mallela
- David McLean
- David Millns
- Buddhi Pradhan
- Sarika Prasad
- Rashid Riaz
- Martin Saggers
- Asif Yaqoob
- Jacqueline Williams

== Squad ==
Each team selected a squad of fifteen players for the tournament, excluding reserves, with South Africa being the first team to name their squad. Afghanistan's departure was delayed due to visa issues, resulting in their warm-up matches being cancelled. After taking part in the 2021 ACC Under-19 Asia Cup in the United Arab Emirates, the Afghanistan team flew from Dubai, via Manchester, to the Caribbean. As a result, some of the Group C fixtures were revised to accommodate Afghanistan's late arrival.

== Group stage ==
=== Group A ===
Pos	Team	Pld	W	L	NR	Pts	NRR
1	England	3	3	0	0	6	3.005
2	Bangladesh	3	2	1	0	4	0.228
3	United Arab Emirates	3	1	2	0	2	−1.493
4	Canada	3	0	3	0	0	−1.823

Source: Cricinfo

15 January 2022
09:00
Scorecard

United Arab Emirates; 284/7 (50 overs)	v	Canada; 235 (46.4 overs)
Ali Naseer 73 (50); Gurnek Johal Singh 2/38 (8 overs)		Mihir Patel 96 (105); Jash Giyanani 2/10 (3 overs)

United Arab Emirates won by 49 runs
Conaree Sports Club, Saint Kitts and Nevis
Umpires: Rizwan Akram (Ned) and Vijaya Mallela (USA)
Player of the match: Ali Naseer (UAE)

- United Arab Emirates won the toss and elected to bat.

16 January 2022
09:00
Scorecard

Bangladesh; 97 (35.2 overs)	v	England; 98/3 (25.1 overs)
Ripon Mondol 33* (41); Joshua Boyden 4/16 (9 overs)		Jacob Bethell 44 (63); Rakibul Hasan 1/13 (4 overs)

England won by 7 wickets
Warner Park, Saint Kitts and Nevis
Umpires: Roland Black (Ire) and Rashid Riaz (Pak)
Player of the match: Joshua Boyden (Eng)

- Bangladesh won the toss and elected to bat.

18 January 2022
09:00
Scorecard

England; 320/7 (50 overs)	v	Canada; 214 (48.1 overs)
Tom Prest 93 (93); Kairav Sharma 3/51 (10 overs)		Gurnek Johal Singh 44 (40); Joshua Boyden 4/44 (10 overs)

England won by 106 runs
Warner Park, Saint Kitts and Nevis
Umpires: Roland Black (Ire) and Asif Yaqoob (Pak)
Player of the match: Tom Prest (Eng)

- Canada won the toss and elected to field.

20 January 2022
09:00
Scorecard

England; 362/6 (50 overs)	v	United Arab Emirates; 173 (38.2 overs)
Tom Prest 154* (119); Jash Giyanani 2/60 (10 overs)		Ali Naseer 54 (44); Rehan Ahmed 4/30 (10 overs)

England won by 189 runs
Warner Park, Saint Kitts and Nevis
Umpires: Nitin Bathi (Ned) and David McLean (Sco)
Player of the match: Tom Prest (Eng)

- England won the toss and elected to bat.

20 January 2022
09:00
Scorecard

Canada; 136 (44.3 overs)	v	Bangladesh; 142/2 (30.1 overs)
Anoop Chima 63 (117); Ripon Mondol 4/24 (8.3 overs)		Iftakher Hossain 61* (89); Ethan Gibson 1/18 (5 overs)

Bangladesh won by 8 wickets
Conaree Sports Club, Saint Kitts and Nevis
Umpires: Roland Black (Ire) and Vijaya Mallela (USA)
Player of the match: Ripon Mondol (Ban)

- Canada won the toss and elected to bat.

22 January 2022
09:00
Scorecard

United Arab Emirates; 148 (48.1 overs)	v	Bangladesh; 110/1 (24.5 overs)
Punya Mehra 43 (64); Ripon Mondol 3/31 (9.1 overs)		Mahfijul Islam 64* (69); Jash Giyanani 1/17 (3 overs)

Bangladesh won by 9 wickets (DLS method)
Warner Park, Saint Kitts and Nevis
Umpires: Rizwan Akram (Ned) and Asif Yaqoob (Pak)
Player of the match: Mahfijul Islam (Ban)

- Bangladesh won the toss and elected to field.
- Bangladesh were set a revised target of 107 runs from 35 overs due to rain.

=== Group B ===
Pos	Team	Pld	W	L	NR	Pts	NRR
1	India	3	3	0	0	6	3.633
2	South Africa	3	2	1	0	4	1.558
3	Ireland	3	1	2	0	2	−1.959
4	Uganda	3	0	3	0	0	−3.240

Source: Cricinfo

15 January 2022
09:00
Scorecard

India; 232 (46.5 overs)	v	South Africa; 187 (45.3 overs)
Yash Dhull 82 (100); Matthew Boast 3/40 (9 overs)		Dewald Brevis 65 (99); Vicky Ostwal 5/28 (10 overs)

India won by 45 runs
Providence Stadium, Guyana
Umpires: Buddhi Pradhan (Nep) and Martin Saggers (Eng)
Player of the match: Vicky Ostwal (Ind)

- South Africa won the toss and elected to field.

15 January 2022
09:00
Scorecard

Ireland; 236/9 (50 overs)	v	Uganda; 197 (48.1 overs)
Joshua Cox 111* (113); Joseph Baguma 2/34 (9 overs)		Pascal Murungi 63 (82); Matthew Humphreys 4/25 (10 overs)

Ireland won by 39 runs
Everest Cricket Club Ground, Guyana
Umpires: Sameer Bandekar (USA) and Arnold Maddela (Can)
Player of the match: Joshua Cox (Ire)

- Uganda won the toss and elected to field.

18 January 2022
09:00
Scorecard

South Africa; 231/9 (50 overs)	v	Uganda; 110 (33.4 overs)
Dewald Brevis 104 (110); Juma Miyaji 3/33 (8 overs)		Isaac Ategeka 29 (72); Liam Alder 2/13 (10 overs)

South Africa won by 121 runs
Queen's Park Oval, Trinidad and Tobago
Umpires: Sameer Bandekar (USA) and Mark Jameson (Ger)
Player of the match: Dewald Brevis (SA)

- South Africa won the toss and elected to bat.

19 January 2022
09:00
Scorecard

India; 307/5 (50 overs)	v	Ireland; 133 (39 overs)
Harnoor Singh 88 (101); Muzamil Sherzad 3/79 (10 overs)		Scott MacBeth 32 (40); Kaushal Tambe 2/8 (2 overs)

India won by 174 runs
Brian Lara Cricket Academy, Trinidad and Tobago
Umpires: David Millns (Eng) and Jacqueline Williams (WI)
Player of the match: Harnoor Singh (Ind)

- Ireland won the toss and elected to field.

21 January 2022
09:00
Scorecard

South Africa; 315/7 (47 overs)	v	Ireland; 158 (33 overs)
George Van Heerden 111 (93); Reuben Wilson 2/59 (9 overs)		Nathan McGuire 42 (33); Liam Alder 3/20 (5 overs)

South Africa won by 153 runs (DLS method)
Brian Lara Cricket Academy, Trinidad and Tobago
Umpires: David Millns (Eng) and Buddhi Pradhan (Nep)
Player of the match: George Van Heerden (SA)

- South Africa won the toss and elected to bat.
- Ireland were set a revised target of 312 runs from 47 overs due to rain.

22 January 2022
09:00
Scorecard

India; 405/5 (50 overs)	v	Uganda; 79 (19.4 overs)
Raj Bawa 162* (108); Pascal Murungi 3/72 (10 overs)		Pascal Murungi 34 (45); Nishant Sindhu 4/19 (4.4 overs)

India won by 326 runs
Brian Lara Cricket Academy, Trinidad and Tobago
Umpires: Martin Saggers (Eng) and Jacqueline Williams (WI)
Player of the match: Raj Bawa (Ind)

- Uganda won the toss and elected to field.

=== Group C ===
Pos	Team	Pld	W	L	NR	Pts	NRR
1	Pakistan	3	3	0	0	6	2.302
2	Afghanistan	3	2	1	0	4	1.110
3	Zimbabwe	3	1	2	0	2	1.130
4	Papua New Guinea	3	0	3	0	0	−3.720

Source: Cricinfo

15 January 2022
09:00
Scorecard

Zimbabwe; 321/9 (50 overs)	v	Papua New Guinea; 93 (35 overs)
Emmanuel Bawa 100 (95); Rasan Kevau 3/65 (9.5 overs)		Malcolm Aporo 15 (49); Victor Chirwa 2/11 (7 overs)

Zimbabwe won by 228 runs
Queen's Park Oval, Trinidad and Tobago
Umpires: Allan Haggo (Sco) and Sarika Prasad (Sin)
Player of the match: Emmanuel Bawa (Zim)

- Zimbabwe won the toss and elected to bat.

17 January 2022
09:00
Scorecard

Pakistan; 315/9 (50 overs)	v	Zimbabwe; 200 (42.4 overs)
Haseebullah Khan 135 (155); Alex Falao 5/58 (9 overs)		Brian Bennett 82 (92); Awais Ali 6/56 (8.4 overs)

Pakistan won by 115 runs
Diego Martin Sporting Complex, Trinidad and Tobago
Umpires: Mark Jameson (Ger) and Sarika Prasad (Sin)
Player of the match: Haseebullah Khan (Pak)

- Zimbabwe won the toss and elected to field.

18 January 2022
09:00
Scorecard

Afghanistan; 200 (38.2 overs)	v	Papua New Guinea; 65 (20.5 overs)
Suliman Safi 70 (79); Katenalaki Singi 4/18 (5 overs)		Aue Oru 13 (23); Izharulhaq Naveed 3/14 (4 overs)

Afghanistan won by 135 runs
Diego Martin Sporting Complex, Trinidad and Tobago
Umpires: Rahul Asher (Oma) and Sarika Prasad (Sin)
Player of the match: Suliman Safi (Afg)

- Afghanistan won the toss and elected to bat.

20 January 2022
09:00
Scorecard

Pakistan; 239/9 (50 overs)	v	Afghanistan; 215/9 (50 overs)
Abdul Faseeh 68 (95); Izharulhaq Naveed 3/41 (10 overs)		Bilal Sayedi 42 (81); Awais Ali 3/36 (8 overs)

Pakistan won by 24 runs
Brian Lara Cricket Academy, Trinidad and Tobago
Umpires: Buddhi Pradhan (Nep) and Martin Saggers (Eng)
Player of the match: Maaz Sadaqat (Pak)

- Pakistan won the toss and elected to bat.

22 January 2022
09:00
Scorecard

Papua New Guinea; 50 (22.4 overs)	v	Pakistan; 51/1 (12 overs)
Christopher Kilapat 11 (30); Muhammad Shehzad 5/7 (6.4 overs)		Abbas Ali 27* (32); Junior Morea 1/12 (3 overs)

Pakistan won by 9 wickets
Queen's Park Oval, Trinidad and Tobago
Umpires: Rahul Asher (Oma) and Allan Haggo (Sco)
Player of the match: Muhammad Shehzad (Pak)

- Papua New Guinea won the toss and elected to bat.

22 January 2022
09:00
Scorecard

Afghanistan; 261/6 (50 overs)	v	Zimbabwe; 152 (36.4 overs)
Suliman Safi 111 (118); Alex Falao 3/54 (10 overs)		Matthew Welch 53 (61); Nangialai Kharoti 4/30 (10 overs)

Afghanistan won by 109 runs
Diego Martin Sporting Complex, Trinidad and Tobago
Umpires: Mark Jameson (Ger) and Arnold Maddela (Can)
Player of the match: Suliman Safi (Afg)

- Afghanistan won the toss and elected to bat.

=== Group D ===
Pos	Team	Pld	W	L	NR	Pts	NRR
1	Sri Lanka	3	3	0	0	6	0.753
2	Australia	3	2	1	0	4	0.096
3	West Indies (H)	3	1	2	0	2	0.699
4	Scotland	3	0	3	0	0	−1.666

Source: Cricinfo
(H) Host

14 January 2022
09:00
Scorecard

West Indies; 169 (40.1 overs)	v	Australia; 170/4 (44.5 overs)
Ackeem Auguste 57 (67); Cooper Connolly 3/17 (7 overs)		Teague Wyllie 86* (129); Johann Layne 1/19 (7 overs)

Australia won by 6 wickets
Providence Stadium, Guyana
Umpires: David Millns (Eng) and Buddhi Pradhan (Nep)
Player of the match: Teague Wyllie (Aus)

- West Indies won the toss and elected to bat.

14 January 2022
09:00
Scorecard

Sri Lanka; 218 (45.2 overs)	v	Scotland; 178 (48.4 overs)
Sakuna Nidarshana Liyanage 79 (84); Sean Fischer-Keogh 3/56 (9 overs)		Jack Jarvis 55 (61); Dunith Wellalage 5/27 (9 overs)

Sri Lanka won by 40 runs
Everest Cricket Club Ground, Guyana
Umpires: Emmerson Carington (Ber) and Heath Kearns (Jer)
Player of the match: Dunith Wellalage (SL)

- Sri Lanka won the toss and elected to bat.

17 January 2022
09:00
Scorecard

Scotland; 95 (35.1 overs)	v	West Indies; 96/3 (19.4 overs)
Oliver Davidson 43 (93); Shiva Sankar 3/17 (7 overs)		Shaqkere Parris 26 (29); Charlie Peet 1/15 (4 overs)

West Indies won by 7 wickets
Warner Park, Saint Kitts and Nevis
Umpires: Roland Black (Ire) and Asif Yaqoob (Pak)
Player of the match: Shiva Sankar (WI)

- West Indies won the toss and elected to field.

17 January 2022
09:00
Scorecard

Australia; 175 (50 overs)	v	Sri Lanka; 177/6 (37 overs)
Campbell Kellaway 54 (77); Dunith Wellalage 5/28 (10 overs)		Dunith Wellalage 52 (71); Joshua Garner 2/21 (4 overs)

Sri Lanka won by 4 wickets
Conaree Sports Club, Saint Kitts and Nevis
Umpires: Nitin Bathi (Ned) and Emmerson Carington (Ber)
Player of the match: Dunith Wellalage (SL)

- Sri Lanka won the toss and elected to field.

19 January 2022
09:00
Scorecard

Scotland; 236/8 (50 overs)	v	Australia; 240/3 (39.5 overs)
Tomas Mackintosh 54 (70); Aidan Cahill 2/33 (5 overs)		Teague Wyllie 101* (115); Oliver Davidson 2/45 (10 overs)

Australia won by 7 wickets
Conaree Sports Club, Saint Kitts and Nevis
Umpires: Rizwan Akram (Ned) and Heath Kearns (Jer)
Player of the match: Teague Wyllie (Aus)

- Australia won the toss and elected to field.

21 January 2022
09:00
Scorecard

West Indies; 250/9 (50 overs)	v	Sri Lanka; 251/7 (48.2 overs)
Kevin Wickham 56 (91); Dunith Wellalage 3/39 (10 overs)		Sadisha Rajapaksa 76 (115); McKenny Clarke 2/38 (9.2 overs)

Sri Lanka won by 3 wickets
Conaree Sports Club, Saint Kitts and Nevis
Umpires: Vijaya Mallela (USA) and David McLean (Sco)
Player of the match: Sadisha Rajapaksa (SL)

- Sri Lanka won the toss and elected to field.

== Plate League ==
13th-place playoff
B4	Uganda	226 (35.4)
D4	Scotland	170 (32.3)
15th-place playoff
C4	Papua New Guinea
A4	Canada

Plate playoff semi-finals
B4	Uganda	123 (28)
C4	Papua New Guinea	88 (19.3)
A4	Canada
D4	Scotland

Plate quarter-finals
A3	United Arab Emirates	127/9 (40.3)
B4	Uganda	123 (38.1)
D3	West Indies	317/6 (50)
C4	Papua New Guinea	148 (37.4)
B3	Ireland	179 (43.3)
A4	Canada	85 (29.2)
C3	Zimbabwe	248 (49.5)
D4	Scotland	140 (39)

Plate semi-finals
A3	United Arab Emirates	224/9 (50)
D3	West Indies	142 (39.4)
B3	Ireland	169/2 (32)
C3	Zimbabwe	166 (48.4)

Plate final
A3	United Arab Emirates	128/2 (26)
B3	Ireland	122 (45.3)
11th-place playoff
D3	West Indies	262/2 (49.2)
C3	Zimbabwe	256/4 (50)

=== Plate quarter-finals ===
25 January 2022
09:00
Scorecard

Uganda; 123 (38.1 overs)	v	United Arab Emirates; 127/9 (40.3 overs)
Ronald Lutaaya 25 (47); Adhitya Shetty 4/29 (10 overs)		Kai Smith 25 (32); Matthew Musinguzi 3/21 (10 overs)

United Arab Emirates won by 1 wicket
Queen's Park Oval, Trinidad and Tobago
Umpires: Arnold Maddela (Can) and David McLean (Sco)
Player of the match: Adhitya Shetty (UAE)

- Uganda won the toss and elected to bat.

25 January 2022
09:00
Scorecard

Ireland; 179 (43.3 overs)	v	Canada; 85 (29.2 overs)
Philippus le Roux 83 (107); Ethan Gibson 3/36 (10 overs)		Kairav Sharma 19 (40); Reuben Wilson 3/18 (7 overs)

Ireland won by 94 runs
Brian Lara Cricket Academy, Trinidad and Tobago
Umpires: Mark Jameson (Ger) and Heath Kearns (Jer)
Player of the match: Philippus le Roux (Ire)

- Canada won the toss and elected to field.

26 January 2022
09:00
Scorecard

Zimbabwe; 248 (49.5 overs)	v	Scotland; 140 (39 overs)
Matthew Welch 78 (117); Jack Jarvis 3/46 (10 overs)		Tomas Mackintosh 25 (41); David Bennett 3/25 (8 overs)

Zimbabwe won by 108 runs
Queen's Park Oval, Trinidad and Tobago
Umpires: Sameer Bandekar (USA) and Nitin Bathi (Ned)
Player of the match: Brian Bennett (Zim)

- Zimbabwe won the toss and elected to bat.

26 January 2022
09:00
Scorecard

West Indies; 317/6 (50 overs)	v	Papua New Guinea; 148 (37.4 overs)
Matthew Nandu 128 (134); Boio Ray 3/43 (8 overs)		Aue Oru 27* (52); Matthew Nandu 2/14 (6 overs)

West Indies won by 169 runs
Diego Martin Sporting Complex, Trinidad and Tobago
Umpires: Allan Haggo (Sco) and Vijaya Mallela (USA)
Player of the match: Matthew Nandu (WI)

- Papua New Guinea won the toss and elected to field.

=== Plate playoff semi-finals ===
28 January 2022
09:00
Scorecard

Uganda; 123 (28 overs)	v	Papua New Guinea; 88 (19.3 overs)
Cyrus Kakuru 65 (59); John Kariko 5/19 (9 overs)		Junior Morea 26 (17); Juma Miyagi 4/29 (9 overs)

Uganda won by 35 runs
Diego Martin Sporting Complex, Trinidad and Tobago
Umpires: Allan Haggo (Sco) and Arnold Maddela (Can)
Player of the match: John Kariko (PNG)

- Uganda won the toss and elected to bat.

29 January 2022
09:00
Scorecard

Canada	v	Scotland

Match cancelled
Brian Lara Cricket Academy, Trinidad and Tobago
Umpires: Heath Kearns (Jer) and Vijaya Mallela (USA)

- The match was cancelled following COVID-19 cases in Canada's team.

=== Plate semi-finals ===
28 January 2022
09:00
Scorecard

United Arab Emirates; 224/9 (50 overs)	v	West Indies; 142 (39.4 overs)
Aayan Afzal Khan 93 (121); Shiva Sankar 3/31 (9 overs)		Nathan Edward 51* (65); Dhruv Parashar 4/30 (9 overs)

United Arab Emirates won by 82 runs
Queen's Park Oval, Trinidad and Tobago
Umpires: Nitin Bathi (Ned) and David McLean (Sco)
Player of the match: Aayan Afzal Khan (UAE)

- United Arab Emirates won the toss and elected to bat.

29 January 2022
09:00
Scorecard

Zimbabwe; 166 (48.4 overs)	v	Ireland; 169/2 (32 overs)
Brian Bennett 37 (56); Muzamil Sherzad 5/20 (7.4 overs)		Jack Dickson 78 (88); Tendekai Mataranyika 1/31 (8 overs)

Ireland won by 8 wickets
Queen's Park Oval, Trinidad and Tobago
Umpires: Mark Jameson (Ger) and Sarika Prasad (Sin)
Player of the match: Tim Tector (Ire)

- Zimbabwe won the toss and elected to bat.
- An earthquake occurred during Zimbabwe's innings and caused the stadium buildings to shake, but did not interrupt play.

== Super League ==
5th-place playoff
D1	Sri Lanka	127 (34.2)
C1	Pakistan	365/3 (50)
7th-place playoff
B2	South Africa	298/8 (48.5)
A2	Bangladesh	293/8 (50)

Super League playoff semi-finals
B2	South Africa	167 (37.3)
D1	Sri Lanka	232/6 (50)
A2	Bangladesh	175 (49.2)
C1	Pakistan	176/4 (46.3)

Super League quarter-finals
A1	England	212/4 (31.2)
B2	South Africa	209 (43.4)
D1	Sri Lanka	130 (46)
C2	Afghanistan	134 (47.1)
B1	India	117/5 (30.5)
A2	Bangladesh	111(37.1)
C1	Pakistan	157 (35.1)
D2	Australia	276/7 (50)

Super League semi-finals
A1	England	231/6 (47)
C2	Afghanistan	215/9 (47)
B1	India	290/5 (50)
D2	Australia	194 (41.5)

Final
A1	England	189 (44.5)
B1	India	195/6 (47.4)
3rd-place playoff
C2	Afghanistan	201 (49.2)
D2	Australia	202/8 (49.1)

=== Super League quarter-finals ===
26 January 2022
09:00
Scorecard

South Africa; 209 (43.4 overs)	v	England; 212/4 (31.2 overs)
Dewald Brevis 97 (88); Rehan Ahmed 4/48 (10 overs)		Jacob Bethell 88 (42); Dewald Brevis 2/40 (6.2 overs)

England won by 6 wickets
Sir Vivian Richards Stadium, Antigua and Barbuda
Umpires: Emmerson Carington (Ber) and Rashid Riaz (Pak)
Player of the match: Jacob Bethell (Eng)

- South Africa won the toss and elected to bat.

27 January 2022
09:00
Scorecard

Afghanistan; 134 (47.1 overs)	v	Sri Lanka; 130 (46 overs)
Abdul Hadi 37 (97); Vinuja Ranpul 5/10 (9.1 overs)		Dunith Wellalage 34 (61); Bilal Sami 2/33 (10 overs)

Afghanistan won by 4 runs
Coolidge Cricket Ground, Antigua and Barbuda
Umpires: Rizwan Akram (Ned) and David Millns (Eng)
Player of the match: Noor Ahmad (Afg)

- Sri Lanka won the toss and elected to field.

28 January 2022
09:00
Scorecard

Australia; 276/7 (50 overs)	v	Pakistan; 157 (35.1 overs)
Teague Wyllie 71 (97); Qasim Akram 3/40 (10 overs)		Mehran Mumtaz 29 (19); Will Salzmann 3/37 (8.1 overs)

Australia won by 119 runs
Sir Vivian Richards Stadium, Antigua and Barbuda
Umpires: Buddhi Pradhan (Nep) and Martin Saggers (Eng)
Player of the match: Teague Wyllie (Aus)

- Pakistan won the toss and elected to field.

29 January 2022
09:00
Scorecard

Bangladesh; 111 (37.1 overs)	v	India; 117/5 (30.5 overs)
SM Meherob 30 (48); Ravi Kumar 3/14 (7 overs)		Angkrish Raghuvanshi 44 (65); Ripon Mondol 4/31 (9 overs)

India won by 5 wickets
Coolidge Cricket Ground, Antigua and Barbuda
Umpires: Rahul Asher (Oma) and Roland Black (Ire)
Player of the match: Ravi Kumar (Ind)

- India won the toss and elected to field.

=== Super League playoff semi-finals ===
30 January 2022
09:00
Scorecard

Sri Lanka; 232/6 (50 overs)	v	South Africa; 167 (37.3 overs)
Dunith Wellalage 113 (130); Kwena Maphaka 3/60 (10 overs)		Gerhardus Maree 44 (43); Raveen de Silva 2/14 (5 overs)

Sri Lanka won by 65 runs
Sir Vivian Richards Stadium, Antigua and Barbuda
Umpires: Emmerson Carington (Ber) and Asif Yaqoob (Pak)
Player of the match: Dunith Wellalage (SL)

- Sri Lanka won the toss and elected to bat.

31 January 2022
09:00
Scorecard

Bangladesh; 175 (49.2 overs)	v	Pakistan; 176/4 (46.3 overs)
Ariful Islam 100 (119); Mehran Mumtaz 3/16 (10 overs)		Haseebullah Khan 79 (107); Rakibul Hasan 2/28 (10 overs)

Pakistan won by 6 wickets
Coolidge Cricket Ground, Antigua and Barbuda
Umpires: Roland Black (Ire) and David Millns (Eng)
Player of the match: Ariful Islam (Ban)

- Bangladesh won the toss and elected to bat.

=== Super League semi-finals ===
1 February 2022
09:00
Scorecard

England; 231/6 (47 overs)	v	Afghanistan; 215/9 (47 overs)
George Bell 56* (67); Noor Ahmad 2/32 (10 overs)		Allah Noor 60 (87); Rehan Ahmed 4/41 (6 overs)

England won by 15 runs (DLS method)
Sir Vivian Richards Stadium, Antigua and Barbuda
Umpires: Asif Yaqoob (Pak) and Jacqueline Williams (WI)
Player of the match: George Bell (Eng)

- England won the toss and elected to bat.
- Afghanistan were set a revised target of 231 runs from 47 overs due to rain.

2 February 2022
09:00
Scorecard

India; 290/5 (50 overs)	v	Australia; 194 (41.5 overs)
Yash Dhull 110 (110); Jack Nisbet 2/41 (9 overs)		Lachlan Shaw 51 (66); Vicky Ostwal 3/42 (10 overs)

India won by 96 runs
Coolidge Cricket Ground, Antigua and Barbuda
Umpires: Rashid Riaz (Pak) and Martin Saggers (Eng)
Player of the match: Yash Dhull (Ind)

- India won the toss and elected to bat.

== 13th to 16th Place play-offs ==
30 January 2022
09:00
Scorecard

Papua New Guinea	v	Canada

Match cancelled
Brian Lara Cricket Academy, Trinidad and Tobago

- The match was cancelled following COVID-19 cases in Canada's team.

30 January 2022
09:00
Scorecard

Uganda; 226 (35.4 overs)	v	Scotland; 170 (32.3 overs)
Ronald Lutaaya 64 (78); Jamie Cairns 6/24 (6.4 overs)		Jack Jarvis 37 (33); Juma Miyagi 4/25 (8 overs)

Uganda won by 51 runs (DLS method)
Diego Martin Sporting Complex, Trinidad and Tobago
Umpires: Heath Kearns (Jer) and Sarika Prasad (Sin)
Player of the match: Juma Miyagi (Uga)

- Uganda won the toss and elected to bat.
- Scotland were set a revised target of 222 runs from 36 overs due to rain.

=== 11th-place playoff ===
31 January 2022
09:00
Scorecard

Zimbabwe; 256/4 (50 overs)	v	West Indies; 262/2 (49.2 overs)
David Bennett 77* (105); Johann Layne 2/44 (7 overs)		Teddy Bishop 112* (121); Brian Bennett 1/31 (6 overs)

West Indies won by 8 wickets
Diego Martin Sporting Complex, Trinidad and Tobago
Umpires: Sameer Bandekar (USA) and Vijaya Mallela (USA)
Player of the match: Teddy Bishop (WI)

- Zimbabwe won the toss and elected to bat.

=== 9th-place playoff (Plate Final) ===
31 January 2022
09:00
Scorecard

Ireland; 122 (45.3 overs)	v	United Arab Emirates; 128/2 (26 overs)
Jack Dickson 40 (83); Jash Giyanani 2/12 (6 overs)		Kai Smith 49 (62); Jamie Forbes 1/32 (7 overs)

United Arab Emirates won by 8 wickets
Queen's Park Oval, Trinidad and Tobago
Umpires: Nitin Bathi (Ned) and David McLean (Sco)
Player of the match: Dhruv Parashar (UAE)

- Ireland won the toss and elected to bat.

=== 7th-place playoff ===
3 February 2022
09:00
Scorecard

Bangladesh; 293/8 (50 overs)	v	South Africa; 298/8 (48.5 overs)
Ariful Islam 102 (103); Kwena Maphaka 3/55 (10 overs)		Dewald Brevis 138 (130); SM Meherob 2/48 (8 overs)

South Africa won by 2 wickets
Coolidge Cricket Ground, Antigua and Barbuda
Umpires: Rizwan Akram (Ned) and Rahul Asher (Oma)
Player of the match: Dewald Brevis (SA)

- Bangladesh won the toss and elected to bat.

=== 5th-place playoff ===
3 February 2022
09:00
Scorecard

Pakistan; 365/3 (50 overs)	v	Sri Lanka; 127 (34.2 overs)
Haseebullah Khan 136 (151); Matheesha Pathirana 2/62 (8 overs)		Vinuja Ranpul 53* (58); Qasim Akram 5/37 (10 overs)

Pakistan won by 238 runs
Sir Vivian Richards Stadium, Antigua and Barbuda
Umpires: David Millns (Eng) and Jacqueline Williams (WI)
Player of the match: Qasim Akram (Pak)

- Sri Lanka won the toss and elected to field.
- Qasim Akram (Pak) became the first player to score a century and take a five-wicket haul in a Youth ODI match.

=== 3rd-place playoff ===
4 February 2022
09:00
Scorecard

Afghanistan; 201 (49.2 overs)	v	Australia; 202/8 (49.1 overs)
Ijaz Ahmad Ahmadzai 81 (79); Nivethan Radhakrishnan 3/31 (10 overs)		Nivethan Radhakrishnan 66 (96); Nangeyalia Kharote 3/35 (9.1 overs)

Australia won by 2 wickets
Coolidge Cricket Ground, Antigua and Barbuda
Umpires: Rashid Riaz (Pak) and Martin Saggers (Eng)
Player of the match: Nivethan Radhakrishnan (Aus)

- Afghanistan won the toss and elected to bat.

=== Final ===
5 February 2022
09:00
Scorecard

England; 189 (44.5 overs)	v	India; 195/6 (47.4 overs)
James Rew 95 (116); Raj Bawa 5/31 (9.5 overs)		Nishant Sindhu 50* (54); Joshua Boyden 2/24 (7 overs)

India won by 4 wickets
Sir Vivian Richards Stadium, Antigua and Barbuda
Umpires: Roland Black (Ire) and Asif Yaqoob (Pak)
Player of the match: Raj Bawa (Ind)

- England won the toss and elected to bat.

== Final standings ==
The final standings for the tournament were as follows:

Pos.	Team
1	India
2	England
3	Australia
4	Afghanistan
5	Pakistan
6	Sri Lanka
7	South Africa
8	Bangladesh
9	United Arab Emirates
10	Ireland
11	West Indies
12	Zimbabwe
13	Uganda
14	Scotland
15	Papua New Guinea
16	Canada

== Team of the tournament ==
On 6 February 2022, the ICC announced the most valuable team of the tournament.

- (Pakistan) Haseebullah Khan (wk)
- (Australia) Teague Wyllie
- (South Africa) Dewald Brevis
- (India) Yash Dhull (c)
- (England) Tom Prest
- (Sri Lanka) Dunith Wellalage
- (India) Raj Bawa
- (India) Vicky Ostwal
- (Bangladesh) Ripon Mondol
- (Pakistan) Awais Ali
- (England) Joshua Boyden
- (Afghanistan) Noor Ahmad
