= 2026 Under-19 Men's Cricket World Cup squads =

List of cricket squads

The 2026 Under-19 Men's Cricket World Cup took place in the Zimbabwe and Namibia in January and February 2026.

The following squads were announced for the tournament.

== Afghanistan ==
Coach:

Afghanistan's squad was announced on 8 January 2026, with Mahboob Khan named as the captain of the team.

- Mahboob Khan (c)
- Khalid Ahmadzai
- Osman Sadat
- Faisal Khan
- Uzairullah Niazai
- Aziz Mia Khil
- Nazif Amiri
- Khatir Stanikzai
- Nooristani Omarzai
- Abdul Aziz
- Salam Khan
- Wahidullah Zadran
- Zaitullah Shaheen
- Rohullah Arab
- ~~Hafeez Zadran~~
- Aqil Khan

Hafeez Zadran was ruled out of Afghanistan's squad due to an injury, with Aqil Khan named as his replacement.

== Australia ==
Coach: (Australia) Tim Nielsen

Australia's squad was announced on 11 December 2025, with Oliver Peake named as the captain of the team.

- Oliver Peake (c)
- Kasey Barton
- Naden Cooray
- Jayden Draper
- Ben Gordon
- Steven Hogan
- Thomas Hogan
- John James
- Charles Lachmund
- Alex Lee-Young
- Will Malajczuk
- Will Byrom
- Nitesh Samuel
- Hayden Schiller
- Aryan Sharma
- ~~William Taylor~~

William Taylor was later ruled out due to back injury and was replaced by Will Byrom

== Bangladesh ==
Coach: (Sri Lanka) Naveed Nawaz

Bangladesh's squad was announced on 2 January 2026, with Azizul Hakim Tamim named as the captain of the team.

- Azizul Hakim Tamim (c)
- Zawad Abrar (vc)
- Samiun Basir Ratul
- Shiekh Parvej Jibon
- Rizan Hossain
- Shahriar Al Amin
- Shadhin Islam
- Md Abdullah
- Farid Hasan Faisal(wk)
- Kalam Siddiki Aleen
- Rifat Beg
- Saad Islam Razin
- Al Fahad
- Shahriar Ahmed
- Iqbal Hossain Emon

== England ==
Coach: (England) Michael Yardy

England's squad was announced on 23 December 2025, with Thomas Rew named as the captain of the team.

- Thomas Rew (c)
- Farhan Ahmed
- Ralphie Albert
- Will Bennison
- Ben Dawkins
- Caleb Falconer
- Ali Farooq
- Alex French
- Alex Green
- Luke Hands
- Manny Lumsden
- Ben Mayes
- James Minto
- ~~Isaac Mohammed~~
- Joe Moores
- Sebastian Morgan

On 7 January 2026, Isaac Mohammed was ruled out of England's squad due to an injury, with Will Bennison named as his replacement.

== India ==
Coach: (India) Hrishikesh Kanitkar

India's squad was announced on 27 December 2025, with Ayush Mhatre named as the captain of the team.

- Ayush Mhatre (c)
- Vihaan Malhotra (vc)
- R.S. Ambrish
- Kanishk Chouhan
- Deepesh Devendran
- Mohamed Enaan
- Aaron George
- Abhigyan Kundu (wk)
- Udhav Mohan
- Henil Patel
- Khilan A. Patel
- Harvansh Singh (wk)
- Kishan Kumar Singh
- Vaibhav Sooryavanshi
- Vedant Trivedi

== Ireland ==
Coach: (Republic of Ireland) Peter Johnston

Ireland's squad was announced on 1 December 2025, with Oliver Riley named as the captain of the team.

- Oliver Riley (c)
- Reuben Wilson (vc)
- Alex Armstrong
- Callum Armstrong
- Marko Bates
- Sebastian Dijkstra
- Thomas Ford
- Samuel Haslett
- Adam Leckey
- Febin Manoj
- Luke Murray
- Robert O'Brien
- Freddie Ogilby
- James West
- Bruce Whaley

== Japan ==
Coach: (Japan) Reo Sakurano-Thomas

Japan's squad was announced on 10 December 2025, with Kazuma Kato-Stafford named as the captain of the team.

- Kazuma Kato-Stafford (c)
- Charles Hara-Hinze
- Gabriel Hara-Hinze
- Montgomery Hara-Hinze
- Kaisei Kobayashi-Doggett
- Timothy Moore
- Skyler Nakayama-Cook
- Ryuki Ozeki
- Nihar Parmar
- Nikhil Pol
- Chihaya Sekine
- Hugo Tani-Kelly
- Sandev Aaryan Waduge
- Kai Wall
- Taylor Waugh

== New Zealand ==
Coach: (New Zealand) Anton Devcich

New Zealand's squad was announced on 20 December 2025, with Tom Jones named as the captain of the team.

- Tom Jones (c)
- Marco Alpe
- Hugo Bogue
- Harry Burns
- Mason Clarke
- Jacob Cotter
- Aryan Mann (wk)
- Brandon Matzopoulos
- Flynn Morey
- Snehith Reddy
- Callum Samson
- Jaskaran Sandhu
- Selwin Sanjay
- Hunter Shore
- ~~Harry Waite~~
- Luke Harrison

Harry Waite ruled out of the tournament and he was replaced by Luke Harrison.

== Pakistan ==
Coach: (Pakistan) Shahid Anwar

Pakistan's squad was announced on 18 December 2025, with Farhan Yousaf named as the captain of the team.

- Farhan Yousaf (c)
- Usman Khan (vc)
- Abdul Subhan
- Ahmed Hussain
- Ali Hasan Baloch
- Ali Raza
- Daniyal Ali Khan
- Hamza Zahoor (wk)
- Huzaifa Ahsan
- Momin Qamar
- Mohammad Sayyam
- ~~Mohammad Shayan~~ (wk)
- Niqab Shafiq
- Sameer Minhas
- Umar Zaib
- Abdul Qadir

Abdul Qadir was named as a replacement after Mohammed Shayan was ruled out due to a nasal bone fracture.

== Scotland ==
Coach: (New Zealand) Keegan Russell

Scotland named their squad on 10 December 2025, with Thomas Knight named as the captain of the team.

- Thomas Knight (c)
- Finlay Carter
- Max Chaplin
- George Cutler
- Rory Grant
- Finlay Jones
- Ollie Jones
- ~~Ali Khan~~
- Olly Pillinger
- Ethan Ramsay
- Theo Robinson
- Manu Saraswat
- Shlok Thaker
- Shreyas Tekale
- Jake Woodhouse
- Ram Sharma

Ram Sharma replaced Ali Khan, who has ruled out of the tournament with a hand injury.

== Sri Lanka ==
Coach: (Sri Lanka) Chamara Silva

Sri Lanka named their squad on 1 January 2026, with Vimath Dinsara named as the captain of the team.

- Vimath Dinsara (c)
- Kavija Gamage (vc)
- Vigneshwaran Akash
- Viran Chamuditha
- Chamika Heentigala
- Adam Hilmy (wk)
- Dimantha Mahavithana
- Kugathas Mathulan
- Chamarindu Nethsara
- Rasith Nimsara
- Sethmika Seneviratne
- Dulnith Siger
- Malintha Silva
- Jeewantha Sriram
- Senuja Wekunagoda

== South Africa ==
Coach: (South Africa) Malibongwe Maketa

South Africa named their squad on 5 December 2025, with Muhammad Bulbulia named as the captain of the team.

- Muhammad Bulbulia (c)
- JJ Basson
- Daniel Bosman
- Corne Botha
- Paul James
- Enathi Khitshini
- Michael Kruiskamp
- Adnaan Lagadien
- Bayanda Majola
- Armaan Manack
- Bandile Mbatha
- Lethabo Phahlamohlaka
- Jason Rowles
- Ntandoyenkosi Soni
- Jorich van Schalkwyk

== Tanzania ==
Coach: (South Africa) Imran Nackerdien

Tanzania's squad was announced on 8 January 2026, with Laksh Bakrania named as the captain of the team.

- Laksh Bakrania (c)
- Karim Kiseto
- Hamza Ally
- Khalidy Amiri
- Alfred Daniel
- Raymond Francis
- Ally Hafidhi
- Darpan Jobanputra
- Agustino Mwamele
- Abdulazak Mohamedi
- Acrey Pascal (wk)
- Omary Ramadhani (wk)
- Ayaan Shariff
- Mohammedi Simba
- ~~Dylan Thakrar~~
- Rehaan Ahtif

Dylan Thakrar was ruled out of the tournament after sustaining an injury to his left middle finger, and replced by Rehaan Ahtif.

== United States ==
Coach:

United States' squad was announced on 8 January 2026, with Utkarsh Srivastava named as the captain of the team.

- Utkarsh Srivastava (c)
- Ritvik Appidi
- Amogh Reddy Arepally
- Sahir Bhatia
- Sahil Garg
- Amrinder Gill
- Adnit Jhamb
- Adit Kappa
- Advaith Krishna
- Arjun Mahesh
- Sabrish Prasad
- Shiv Shani
- Rishabh Shimpi
- Nitish Sudini
- Rayaan Taj

== West Indies ==
Coach: (Cricket West Indies) Rohan Nurse

West Indies named their squad on 17 December 2025, with Joshua Dorne named as the captain of the team.

- Joshua Dorne (c)
- Jewel Andrew
- Shamar Apple
- Shaquan Belle
- Zachary Carter
- Tanez Francis
- R'jai Gittens
- Vitel Lawes
- Micah McKenzie
- Matthew Miller
- Isra-el Morton
- Jakeem Pollard
- Aadian Racha
- Kunal Tilokani
- Jonathan Van Lange

== Zimbabwe ==
Coach: (Zimbabwe) Elton Chigumbura

Zimbabwe named their squad on 10 December 2025, with Simbarashe Mudzengerere named as the captain of the team.

- Simbarashe Mudzengerere (c)
- Kian Blignaut
- Michael Blignaut
- Leeroy Chiwaula
- Tatenda Chimugoro
- Nathaniel Hlabangana
- Takudzwa Makoni
- Panashe Mazai
- Webster Madhidhi
- Shelton Mazvitorera
- Kupakwashe Muradzi
- Brandon Ndiweni
- Dhruv Patel
- Brendon Senzere
- Benny Zuze
