= List of Under-19 Cricket World Cup centuries =

List of centuries in cricket

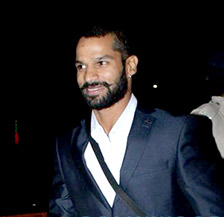
India's Shikhar Dhawan scored three centuries in the Under-19 Cricket World Cup, the first of three players to achieve this feat.

In cricket, a player is said to have completed a century when they score 100 or more runs in a single innings. The Under-19 Cricket World Cup is the international championship of under-19 One Day International cricket, and is organized by the sport's governing body, the International Cricket Council (ICC). It was first held in 1988, and then 1998, since when it has been contested every two years. As of the 2026 edition, a total of 184 centuries have been scored by 160 players from 20 different teams. (Note: The 12 teams for which no player has scored a century are the Americas, Bermuda, Denmark, Fiji, Hong Kong, the ICC Associates, Malaysia, Nepal, the Netherlands, Nigeria, Tanzania, and Uganda.) Indian batsmen have scored the highest number of centuries (25), followed by Australia and South Africa with 23 each. New Zealand and Scotland have conceded 13 centuries each, which is more than any other team. At least one century has been conceded by 27 of the participating teams. (Note: The five teams that have not conceded a century are the Americas, Bermuda, Hong Kong, Malaysia, and the Netherlands.)

The first century of the championship was scored by Brett Williams of Australia when he scored 112 runs against the West Indies in the 1988 Youth Cricket World Cup. Viran Chamuditha scored the highest innings of the championship in the 2026 edition, scoring 192 runs for Sri Lanka against Japan. India's Shikhar Dhawan, England's Jack Burnham and Bangladesh's Ariful Islam hold the record for the highest number of centuries (3 each), and are followed by eighteen other players who have scored two centuries. Lendl Simmons of the West Indies, Brendan Taylor of Zimbabwe, Eoin Morgan of Ireland, Babar Azam of Pakistan, Emmanuel Bawa of Zimbabwe and Ariful Islam Jony of Bangladesh are the only players to have scored centuries in more than one edition of the championship.

The highest number of centuries was scored in the 2018 edition (25), whereas the lowest number of centuries was scored in the 1988, 2000, and 2008 editions with three each. The highest number of centuries at a single ground has been scored at Lincoln No. 3, Lincoln, with nine centuries, followed by Harare Sports Club with 8 centuries, Bert Sutcliffe Oval in Lincoln, Mangaung Oval in Bloemfontein and Khan Shaheb Osman Ali Stadium in Fatullah, with seven centuries each. Seven centuries have been scored in World Cup finals. They were scored by India's Unmukt Chand, Manjot Kalra and Vaibhav Sooryavanshi, Australia's Brett Williams and Jarrad Burke, and England's Stephen Peters and Caleb Falconer; Falconer's century remains the only one to have come in a losing cause. Sooryavanshi's 175 runs against England in the 2026 final is the highest individual score in a final.

== Key ==
Symbol	Meaning
Runs	Number of runs scored
*	Batsman remained not out
†	Scored in a final
Balls	Number of balls faced
–	Statistic was not recorded
4s	Number of fours hit
6s	Number of sixes hit
S/R	Strike rate (runs scored per 100 balls)
No result	The match was a no result

== Centuries ==
List of Under-19 World Cup centuries
No.	Player	Runs	Balls	4s	6s	S/R	Team	Opposition	Venue	Date	Result	Ref
1	Brett Williams	112	122	5	3	91.80	Australia	West Indies	Mildura City Oval, Mildura, Australia	28 February 1988	Won	
2	Geoff Parker	103	–	–	–	–	Australia	ICC Associates (Note: The ICC Associates team represented the then associate members of the ICC, with the squad consisting of four players from Zimbabwe and two players from Bangladesh, Bermuda, Canada, Denmark and the Netherlands each.)	Wentworth Oval, Wentworth, Australia	3 March 1988	Won	
3	Brett Williams	108 †	134	7	2	80.59	Australia	Pakistan	Adelaide Oval, Adelaide, Australia	13 March 1988	Won	
4	Dominic Thornely	126	–	–	–	–	Australia	Zimbabwe	Absa Puk Oval, Potchefstroom, South Africa	12 January 1998	Won	
5	Marcus North	115	–	–	–	–	Australia	Zimbabwe	Absa Puk Oval, Potchefstroom, South Africa	12 January 1998	Won	
6	James Hopes	105	–	–	–	–	Australia	West Indies	Absa Puk Oval, Potchefstroom, South Africa	13 January 1998	Won	
7	Bazid Khan	106	–	–	–	–	Pakistan	Denmark	Christian Brothers College Old Boys Ground, Boksburg, South Africa	13 January 1998	Won	
8	Mark Vermeulen	112*	–	–	–	–	Zimbabwe	Papua New Guinea	Recreation Ground, Klerksdorp, South Africa	13 January 1998	Won	
9	Jonathan Kent	102	–	–	–	–	South Africa	Kenya	Soweto Cricket Oval, Soweto, South Africa	13 January 1998	Won	
10	Scott Kremerskothen	164	–	–	–	–	Australia	Papua New Guinea	Vaal Reefs Cricket Club Ground, Orkney, South Africa	15 January 1998	Won	
11	Reetinder Sodhi	126	150	8	5	84.00	India	Kenya	Azaadville Ova, Johannesburg, South Africa	15 January 1998	Won	
12	James Marshall	164*	–	–	–	–	New Zealand	Namibia	LC de Villiers Oval, Pretoria, South Africa	15 January 1998	Won	
13	Greig Butchart	128*	–	–	–	–	Scotland	Namibia	Avion Park Cricket Club, Kempton Park, South Africa	19 January 1998	Won	
14	Chris Gayle	141*	–	–	–	–	West Indies	Bangladesh	Gert van Rensburg Stadium, Fochville, South Africa	24 January 1998	Lost	
15	Stephen Peters	107 †	125	12	0	85.60	England	New Zealand	Wanderers Stadium, Johannesburg, South Africa	1 February 1998	Won	
16	Shane Watson	100*	104	8	3	96.15	Australia	Namibia	Paikiasothy Saravanamuttu Stadium, Colombo, Sri Lanka	11 January 2000	Won	
17	Jacques Rudolph	156*	140	12	2	111.42	South Africa	Nepal	Air Force Ground, Katunayake, Sri Lanka	12 January 2000	No result	
18	Ravneet Ricky	108	148	14	0	72.97	India	Australia	Paikiasothy Saravanamuttu Stadium, Colombo, Sri Lanka	25 January 2000	Won	
19	Craig Simmons	155	115	12	11	134.78	Australia	Kenya	Carisbrook, Dunedin, New Zealand	20 January 2002	Won	
20	Shaun Marsh	125	81	12	4	154.32	Australia	Kenya	Carisbrook, Dunedin, New Zealand	20 January 2002	Won	
21	Stephen Cook	103	120	8	0	85.83	South Africa	Bangladesh	Colin Maiden Park, Auckland, New Zealand	20 January 2002	Won	
22	Manvinder Bisla	128	132	13	1	96.96	India	Canada	Colin Maiden Park, Auckland, New Zealand	21 January 2002	Won	
23	Donovan Pagon	176	129	21	5	136.43	West Indies	Scotland	Carisbrook, Dunedin, New Zealand	21 January 2002	Won	
24	Lendl Simmons	121*	120	11	1	100.83	West Indies	Scotland	Carisbrook, Dunedin, New Zealand	21 January 2002	Won	
25	Chandan Madan	105*	109	8	2	96.33	India	South Africa	North Harbour Stadium, North Shore, New Zealand	23 January 2002	Won	
26	Cameron White	156*	121	10	4	128.92	Australia	Scotland	Carisbrook, Dunedin, New Zealand	25 January 2002	Won	
27	Steven Gilmour	100*	121	9	1	82.64	Scotland	Namibia	Eden Park, Auckland, New Zealand	28 January 2002	Lost	
28	Stephan Swanepoel	142	131	16	2	108.39	Namibia	Scotland	Eden Park, Auckland, New Zealand	28 January 2002	Won	
29	Morris Ouma	150*	131	20	2	114.50	Kenya	Papua New Guinea	Colin Maiden Park No. 2, Auckland, New Zealand	31 January 2002	Won	
30	Brendan Taylor	100*	130	5	0	76.92	Zimbabwe	Nepal	Lincoln No. 3, Lincoln, New Zealand	8 February 2002	Won	
31	Jarrad Burke	100* †	130	11	0	76.92	Australia	South Africa	Bert Sutcliffe Oval, Lincoln, New Zealand	9 February 2002	Won	
32	Shikhar Dhawan	155*	138	15	1	112.31	India	Scotland	Bangabandhu National Stadium, Dhaka, Bangladesh	16 February 2004	Won	
33	Tishan Maraj	117	112	15	0	104.46	West Indies	Papua New Guinea	Birshreshtha Shaheed Flight Lieutenant Matiur Rahman Stadium (Note: The Birshreshtha Shaheed Flight Lieutenant Matiur Rahman Stadium is now known as the Sheikh Abu Naser Stadium.), Khulna, Bangladesh	18 February 2004	Won	
34	Lendl Simmons	107	96	12	3	111.45	West Indies	Papua New Guinea	Birshreshtha Shaheed Flight Lieutenant Matiur Rahman Stadium, Khulna, Bangladesh	18 February 2004	Won	
35	BJ Watling	154	134	17	1	114.92	New Zealand	Scotland	Bangladesh Krira Shikkha Protisthan Ground, Savar, Bangladesh	19 February 2004	Won	
36	Brad Wilson	144*	118	18	2	122.03	New Zealand	Scotland	Bangladesh Krira Shikkha Protisthan Ground, Savar, Bangladesh	19 February 2004	Won	
37	Shikhar Dhawan	120	148	14	0	81.08	India	Bangladesh	Bangabandhu National Stadium, Dhaka, Bangladesh	20 February 2004	Won	
38	Eoin Morgan	117	129	15	0	90.69	Ireland	Uganda	M. A. Aziz Stadium, Chittagong, (Note: Chittagong is now known as Chattogram.) Bangladesh	23 February 2004	Won	
39	Alastair Cook	108*	131	11	0	82.44	England	New Zealand	Bangabandhu National Stadium, Dhaka, Bangladesh	23 February 2004	Won	
40	Samit Patel	102*	90	12	0	113.33	England	New Zealand	Bangabandhu National Stadium, Dhaka, Bangladesh	23 February 2004	Won	
41	Upul Tharanga	117	140	9	2	83.57	Sri Lanka	South Africa	Khan Shaheb Osman Ali Stadium, Fatullah, Bangladesh	24 February 2004	Won	
42	Jaco Booysen	120	114	13	0	105.26	South Africa	Sri Lanka	Khan Shaheb Osman Ali Stadium, Fatullah, Bangladesh	24 February 2004	Lost	
43	Alastair Cook	108*	131	10	0	82.44	England	Zimbabwe	Bangladesh Krira Shikkha Protisthan Ground, Savar, Bangladesh	25 February 2004	Won	
44	Xavier Marshall	106	133	8	1	79.69	West Indies	South Africa	Khan Shaheb Osman Ali Stadium, Fatullah, Bangladesh	26 February 2004	Won	
45	Shikhar Dhawan	146	136	19	2	107.35	India	Sri Lanka	Bangabandhu National Stadium, Dhaka, Bangladesh	26 February 2004	Won	
46	Brendan Taylor	127	145	18	1	87.58	Zimbabwe	New Zealand	Bangabandhu National Stadium, Dhaka, Bangladesh	27 February 2004	Won	
47	Tom Cooper	104	134	12	1	77.61	Australia	South Africa	Singhalese Sports Club Cricket Ground, Colombo, Sri Lanka	5 February 2006	Won	
48	William Perkins	133	150	16	0	88.66	West Indies	United States	Nondescripts Cricket Club Ground, Colombo, Sri Lanka	6 February 2006	Won	
49	Eoin Morgan	124	126	12	3	98.41	Ireland	New Zealand	R. Premadasa Stadium, Colombo, Sri Lanka	14 February 2006	Lost	
50	Andrew de Boorder	100*	115	8	0	86.95	New Zealand	United States	Paikiasothy Saravanamuttu Stadium, Colombo, Sri Lanka	15 February 2006	Won	
51	Cheteshwar Pujara	129*	146	10	1	88.35	India	England	R. Premadasa Stadium, Colombo, Sri Lanka	15 February 2006	Won	
52	Michael Hill	124	71	7	12	174.64	Australia	Namibia	Penang Sports Club, George Town, Malaysia	17 February 2008	Won	
53	Steven Jacobs	101	86	11	2	117.44	West Indies	Papua New Guinea	Royal Selangor Club, Kuala Lumpur, Malaysia	20 February 2008	Won	
54	Virat Kohli	100	74	10	4	135.13	India	West Indies	Kinrara Academy Oval, Puchong, Malaysia	22 February 2008	Won	
55	Babar Azam	129	132	14	1	97.72	Pakistan	West Indies	Fitzherbert Park, Palmerston North, New Zealand	15 January 2010	Won	
56	Paul Stirling	114	102	12	1	111.76	Ireland	United States	Queenstown Events Centre, Queenstown, New Zealand	19 January 2010	Won	
57	Ben Stokes	100	88	4	6	113.63	England	India	Bert Sutcliffe Oval, Lincoln, New Zealand	21 January 2010	Won	
58	Dominic Hendricks	107*	141	8	0	75.88	South Africa	New Zealand	Lincoln No. 3, Lincoln, New Zealand	25 January 2010	Won	
59	Yannic Cariah	110*	127	6	3	86.61	West Indies	Sri Lanka	Queen Elizabeth II Park, Christchurch, New Zealand	29 January 2010	Won	
60	Anamul Haque	101	127	9	1	79.52	Bangladesh	Sri Lanka	Allan Border Field, Brisbane, Australia	11 August 2012	Won	
61	Will Young	115	111	5	3	103.60	New Zealand	Scotland	John Blanck Oval, Sunshine Coast, Australia	12 August 2012	Won	
62	Cameron Bancroft	125	139	7	2	89.92	Australia	Nepal	Tony Ireland Stadium, Townsville, Australia	13 August 2012	Won	
63	Babar Azam	106*	121	10	2	87.60	Pakistan	Scotland	Kev Hackney Oval, Sunshine Coast, Australia	13 August 2012	Won	
64	Malcolm Lake	118	107	10	5	110.28	Zimbabwe	India	Tony Ireland Stadium, Townsville, Australia	14 August 2012	Lost	
65	Quinton de Kock	126	106	13	3	118.86	South Africa	Namibia	Peter Burge Oval, Brisbane, Australia	14 August 2012	Won	
66	Chad Bowes	115	115	11	0	100.00	South Africa	Namibia	Peter Burge Oval, Brisbane, Australia	14 August 2012	Won	
67	Christopher Kent	105*	117	11	2	89.74	Papua New Guinea	Afghanistan	Allan Border Field, Brisbane, Australia	19 August 2012	Lost	
68	Javed Ahmadi	134	111	17	4	120.72	Afghanistan	Scotland	Allan Border Field, Brisbane, Australia	21 August 2012	Won	
69	Liton Das	102	134	9	1	76.11	Bangladesh	England	Endeavour Park No. 2, Townsville, Australia	21 August 2012	Lost	
70	Sandun Weerakkody	112*	121	10	3	92.56	Sri Lanka	Ireland	Allan Border Field, Brisbane, Australia	22 August 2012	Won	
71	Anamul Haque	128	112	5	8	114.28	Bangladesh	Pakistan	Endeavour Park No. 2, Townsville, Australia	24 August 2012	Won	
72	Sam Wood	104	111	4	7	93.69	England	West Indies	Endeavour Park No. 1, Townsville, Australia	24 August 2012	Won	
73	John Campbell	105	133	8	2	78.94	West Indies	England	Endeavour Park No. 1, Townsville, Australia	24 August 2012	Lost	
74	Unmukt Chand	111* †	130	7	6	85.38	India	Australia	Tony Ireland Stadium, Townsville, Australia	26 August 2012	Won	
75	Shadman Islam	126*	142	14	1	88.73	Bangladesh	Afghanistan	Sheikh Zayed Cricket Stadium Nursery 2, Abu Dhabi, United Arab Emirates	15 February 2014	Won	
76	Yaseen Valli	102*	92	10	2	110.86	South Africa	Canada	Tolerance Oval, Abu Dhabi, United Arab Emirates	16 February 2014	Won	
77	Robert O'Donnell	107*	117	6	4	91.45	New Zealand	United Arab Emirates	Sharjah Cricket Stadium, Sharjah, United Arab Emirates	16 February 2014	Won	
78	Aiden Markram	120*	119	13	1	100.84	South Africa	Zimbabwe	Sheikh Zayed Cricket Stadium, Abu Dhabi, United Arab Emirates	18 February 2014	Won	
79	Hashan Dumindu	113*	118	11	1	95.76	Sri Lanka	United Arab Emirates	Sharjah Cricket Stadium, Sharjah, United Arab Emirates	18 February 2014	Won	
80	Imam-ul-Haq	133	137	13	1	97.08	Pakistan	Scotland	ICC Academy Ground No. 2, Dubai, United Arab Emirates	19 February 2014	Won	
81	Aiden Markram	105*	118	9	0	88.98	South Africa	Afghanistan	Sharjah Cricket Stadium, Sharjah, United Arab Emirates	23 February 2014	Won	
82	Nicholas Pooran	143	160	14	6	89.37	West Indies	Australia	Dubai International Cricket Stadium, Dubai, United Arab Emirates	23 February 2014	Lost	
83	Tagenarine Chanderpaul	112	136	8	1	82.35	West Indies	India	Sharjah Cricket Stadium, Sharjah, United Arab Emirates	27 February 2014	Lost	
84	Ben Duckett	100	109	9	0	91.74	England	Australia	ICC Academy Ground, Dubai, United Arab Emirates	28 February 2014	Won	
85	Liam Smith	100	146	9	1	68.49	South Africa	Bangladesh	Zohur Ahmed Chowdhury Stadium, Chittagong, Bangladesh	27 January 2016	Lost	
86	Dan Lawrence	174	150	25	1	116.00	England	Fiji	M. A. Aziz Stadium, Chittagong, Bangladesh	27 January 2016	Won	
87	Jack Burnham	148	137	19	4	108.02	England	Fiji	M. A. Aziz Stadium, Chittagong, Bangladesh	27 January 2016	Won	
88	Najmul Hossain Shanto	113*	117	10	0	96.58	Bangladesh	Scotland	Sheikh Kamal International Stadium, Cox's Bazar, Bangladesh	31 January 2016	Won	
89	Jack Burnham	106*	104	5	6	101.92	England	Zimbabwe	Zohur Ahmed Chowdhury Stadium, Chittagong, Bangladesh	31 January 2016	Won	
90	Shamar Springer	106	78	10	4	135.89	West Indies	Fiji	M. A. Aziz Stadium, Chittagong, Bangladesh	31 January 2016	Won	
91	Karim Janat	156	132	12	6	118.18	Afghanistan	Fiji	Sheikh Kamal International Stadium, Cox's Bazar, Bangladesh	5 February 2016	Won	
92	Rishabh Pant	111	96	14	2	115.62	India	Namibia	Khan Shaheb Osman Ali Stadium, Fatullah, Bangladesh	6 February 2016	Won	
93	Umair Masood	113	114	15	2	99.12	Pakistan	West Indies	Khan Shaheb Osman Ali Stadium, Fatullah, Bangladesh	8 February 2016	Lost	
94	Hasan Mohsin	117	106	8	3	110.37	Pakistan	Nepal	Khan Shaheb Osman Ali Stadium, Fatullah, Bangladesh	9 February 2016	Won	
95	Jack Burnham	109	123	10	3	88.61	England	Namibia	Khan Shaheb Osman Ali Stadium, Fatullah, Bangladesh	10 February 2016	Won	
96	Tariq Stanikzai	106*	142	10	2	74.64	Afghanistan	Zimbabwe	Sheikh Kamal International Stadium, Cox's Bazar, Bangladesh	12 February 2016	Won	
97	Dean Foxcroft	117	137	13	1	85.40	South Africa	New Zealand	Sheikh Kamal International Stadium, Cox's Bazar, Bangladesh	12 February 2016	Won	
98	Finn Allen	115*	100	15	2	115.00	New Zealand	West Indies	Bay Oval, Mount Maunganui, New Zealand	13 January 2018	Won	
99	Dhananjaya Lakshan	101*	120	8	1	84.16	Sri Lanka	Ireland	Cobham Oval, Whangārei, New Zealand	14 January 2018	Won	
100	Raynard van Tonder	143	121	14	5	118.18	South Africa	Kenya	Lincoln No. 3, Lincoln, New Zealand	14 January 2018	Won	
101	Towhid Hridoy	122	126	9	1	96.82	Bangladesh	Canada	Bert Sutcliffe Oval, Lincoln, New Zealand	15 January 2018	Won	
102	Jakob Bhula	180	144	10	5	125.00	New Zealand	Kenya	Hagley Park, Christchurch, New Zealand	17 January 2018	Won	
103	Rachin Ravindra	117	101	8	3	115.84	New Zealand	Kenya	Hagley Park, Christchurch, New Zealand	17 January 2018	Won	
104	Harry Brook	102*	84	13	3	121.42	England	Bangladesh	Queenstown Events Centre, Queenstown, New Zealand	18 January 2018	Won	
105	Nathan McSweeney	156	111	18	4	140.54	Australia	Papua New Guinea	Lincoln No. 3, Lincoln, New Zealand	19 January 2018	Won	
106	Alick Athanaze	116*	93	15	1	124.73	West Indies	Kenya	Lincoln No. 3, Lincoln, New Zealand	20 January 2018	Won	
107	Liam Banks	120	114	12	1	105.26	England	Canada	Queenstown Events Centre, Queenstown, New Zealand	20 January 2018	Won	
108	Will Jacks	102	82	11	0	124.39	England	Canada	Queenstown Events Centre, Queenstown, New Zealand	20 January 2018	Won	
109	Hermann Rolfes	108	124	12	0	87.09	South Africa	New Zealand	Bay Oval, Mount Maunganui, New Zealand	20 January 2018	Lost	
110	Akash Gill	120	115	12	2	104.34	Canada	Papua New Guinea	Lincoln No. 3, Lincoln, New Zealand	22 January 2018	Won	
111	Hasitha Boyagoda	191	152	28	2	125.65	Sri Lanka	Kenya	Lincoln No. 3, Lincoln, New Zealand	23 January 2018	Won	
112	Lo-handre Louwrens	114	76	13	3	150.00	Namibia	Kenya	Lincoln No. 3, Lincoln, New Zealand	25 January 2018	Won	
113	Nishan Madushka	109*	135	9	0	80.74	Sri Lanka	Zimbabwe	Bert Sutcliffe Oval, Lincoln, New Zealand	25 January 2018	Won	
114	Keagan Simmons	166	137	17	0	121.16	West Indies	Canada	Bert Sutcliffe Oval, Lincoln, New Zealand	26 January 2018	Won	
115	Harry Tector	101	113	10	0	89.38	Ireland	Namibia	Lincoln No. 3, Lincoln, New Zealand	27 January 2018	Won	
116	Matthew Breetzke	115	132	8	1	87.12	South Africa	New Zealand	Hagley Park, Christchurch, New Zealand	27 January 2018	Won	
117	Raynard van Tonder	117	129	10	1	90.69	South Africa	New Zealand	Hagley Park, Christchurch, New Zealand	27 January 2018	Won	
118	Alick Athanaze	110*	110	5	2	100.00	West Indies	Sri Lanka	Bert Sutcliffe Oval, Lincoln, New Zealand	28 January 2018	Lost	
119	Hasitha Boyagoda	116	124	17	1	93.54	Sri Lanka	West Indies	Bert Sutcliffe Oval, Lincoln, New Zealand	28 January 2018	Won	
120	Shubman Gill	102*	94	7	0	108.51	India	Pakistan	Hagley Park, Christchurch, New Zealand	30 January 2018	Won	
121	Tom Banton	112	122	10	2	91.80	England	New Zealand	Queenstown Events Centre, Queenstown, New Zealand	30 January 2018	Won	
122	Manjot Kalra	101* †	102	8	3	99.01	India	Australia	Bay Oval, Mount Maunganui, New Zealand	3 February 2018	Won	
123	Jonathan Figy	102*	101	13	1	100.99	United Arab Emirates	Canada	Mangaung Oval, Bloemfontein, South Africa	18 January 2020	Won	
124	Bryce Parsons	121	91	15	3	132.96	South Africa	Canada	Senwes Park, Potchefstroom, South Africa	22 January 2020	Won	
125	Ravindu Rasantha	102*	111	7	2	91.89	Sri Lanka	Nigeria	North West University No 2 Ground, Potchefstroom, South Africa	27 January 2020	Won	
126	Emmanuel Bawa	105*	95	13	0	110.52	Zimbabwe	Canada	North West University No 2 Ground, Potchefstroom, South Africa	28 January 2020	Won	
127	Nicholas Manohar	101	102	16	0	99.01	Canada	Japan	Ibbies Oval, Potchefstroom, South Africa	30 January 2020	Won	
128	Dan Mousley	111	135	9	1	82.22	England	Sri Lanka	Willowmoore Park, Benoni, South Africa	3 February 2020	Won	
129	Yashasvi Jaiswal	105*	113	8	4	92.92	India	Pakistan	Senwes Park, Potchefstroom, South Africa	4 February 2020	Won	
130	Mahmudul Hasan Joy	100	127	13	0	78.74	Bangladesh	New Zealand	Senwes Park, Potchefstroom, South Africa	6 February 2020	Won	
131	Emmanuel Bawa	100	95	10	2	105.26	Zimbabwe	Papua New Guinea	Queen's Park Oval, Port of Spain, Trinidad and Tobago	15 January 2022	Won	
132	Joshua Cox	111	113	8	1	98.23	Ireland	Uganda	Everest Cricket Club Ground, Guyana	15 January 2022	Won	
133	Haseebullah Khan	135	155	10	4	87.09	Pakistan	Zimbabwe	Diego Martin Sporting Complex, Diego Martin, Trinidad and Tobago	17 January 2022	Won	
134	Dewald Brevis	104	110	11	1	94.54	South Africa	Uganda	Queen's Park Oval, Port of Spain, Trinidad and Tobago	18 January 2022	Won	
135	Teague Wyllie	101*	115	8	2	87.82	Australia	Scotland	Conaree Sports Club, Basseterre, Saint Kitts and Nevis	19 January 2022	Won	
136	Tom Prest	154*	119	13	4	129.41	England	United Arab Emirates	Warner Park, Basseterre, Saint Kitts and Nevis	20 January 2022	Won	
137	George Van Heerden	111	93	3	8	119.35	South Africa	Ireland	Brian Lara Cricket Academy, San Fernando, Trinidad and Tobago	21 January 2022	Won	
138	Angkrish Raghuvanshi	144	120	22	4	120.00	India	Uganda	Brian Lara Cricket Academy, San Fernando, Trinidad and Tobago	22 January 2022	Won	
139	Raj Angad Bawa	162*	108	14	8	150.00	India	Uganda	Brian Lara Cricket Academy, San Fernando, Trinidad and Tobago	22 January 2022	Won	
140	Suliman Safi	111	118	14	3	94.06	Afghanistan	Zimbabwe	Diego Martin Sporting Complex, Diego Martin, Trinidad and Tobago	22 January 2022	Won	
141	Matthew Nandu	128	134	15	2	95.52	West Indies	Papua New Guinea	Diego Martin Sporting Complex, Diego Martin, Trinidad and Tobago	26 January 2022	Won	
142	Dunith Wellalage	113	130	9	4	86.92	Sri Lanka	South Africa	Sir Vivian Richards Stadium, North Sound, Antigua and Barbuda	30 January 2022	Won	
143	Ariful Islam Jony	100	119	5	4	84.03	Bangladesh	Pakistan	Coolidge Cricket Ground, Osbourn, Antigua and Barbuda	31 January 2022	Lost	
144	Teddy Bishop	112*	121	11	1	92.56	West Indies	Zimbabwe	Diego Martin Sporting Complex, Diego Martin, Trinidad and Tobago	31 January 2022	Won	
145	Kevin Wickham	104	116	17	0	89.65	West Indies	Zimbabwe	Diego Martin Sporting Complex, Diego Martin, Trinidad and Tobago	31 January 2022	Won	
146	Yash Dhull	110	110	10	1	100.00	India	Australia	Coolidge Cricket Ground, Osbourn, Antigua and Barbuda	2 February 2022	Won	
147	Haseebullah Khan	136	151	9	2	90.06	Pakistan	Sri Lanka	Sir Vivian Richards Stadium, North Sound, Antigua and Barbuda	3 February 2022	Won	
148	Qasim Akram	135*	80	13	6	168.75	Pakistan	Sri Lanka	Sir Vivian Richards Stadium, North Sound, Antigua and Barbuda	3 February 2022	Won	
149	Ariful Islam Jony	102	103	9	3	99.02	Bangladesh	South Africa	Coolidge Cricket Ground, Osbourn, Antigua and Barbuda	3 February 2022	Lost	
150	Dewald Brevis	138	130	11	7	106.15	South Africa	Bangladesh	Coolidge Cricket Ground, Osbourn, Antigua and Barbuda	3 February 2022	Won	
151	Jewel Andrew	130	96	14	3	135.41	West Indies	South Africa	JB Marks Oval, Potchefstroom, South Africa	19 January 2024	Lost	
152	Shahzaib Khan	106	126	10	3	84.12	Pakistan	Afghanistan	Buffalo Park, East London, South Africa	20 January 2024	Won	
153	Snehith Reddy	147*	125	11	6	117.60	New Zealand	Nepal	Buffalo Park, East London, South Africa	21 January 2024	Won	
154	Musheer Khan	118	106	9	4	111.32	India	Ireland	Mangaung Oval, Bloemfontein, South Africa	25 January 2024	Won	
155	Ariful Islam Jony	103	103	9	0	100.00	Bangladesh	United States	Mangaung Oval, Bloemfontein, South Africa	26 January 2024	Won	
156	Arshin Kulkarni	108	118	8	3	91.53	India	United States	Mangaung Oval, Bloemfontein, South Africa	28 January 2024	Won	
157	Musheer Khan	131	126	13	3	103.96	India	New Zealand	Mangaung Oval, Bloemfontein, South Africa	30 January 2024	Won	
158	Hugh Weibgen	120	126	15	0	95.23	Australia	England	Diamond Oval, Kimberley, South Africa	31 January 2024	Won	
159	Sam Konstas	108	121	11	1	89.25	Australia	West Indies	Diamond Oval, Kimberley, South Africa	2 February 2024	No result	
160	Uday Saharan	100	107	9	0	93.45	India	Nepal	Mangaung Oval, Bloemfontein, South Africa	2 February 2024	Won	
161	Sachin Dhas	116	101	11	3	114.85	India	Nepal	Mangaung Oval, Bloemfontein, South Africa	2 February 2024	Won	
162	Steven Hogan	115	111	11	1	103.60	Australia	Ireland	Namibia Cricket Ground, Windhoek, Namibia	16 January 2026	Won	
163	Dimantha Mahavithana	115	125	11	0	92.00	Sri Lanka	Japan	United Ground, Windhoek, Namibia	17 January 2026	Won	
164	Viran Chamuditha	192	143	26	1	134.26	Sri Lanka	Japan	United Ground, Windhoek, Namibia	17 January 2026	Won	
165	Hugo Tani-Kelly	101	162	6	1	62.34	Japan	Sri Lanka	United Ground, Windhoek, Namibia	17 January 2026	Lost	
166	Nitish Sudini	117*	133	12	1	87.96	United States	New Zealand	Queens Sports Club, Bulawayo, Zimbabwe	18 January 2026	No result	
167	Muhammed Bulbulia	108	108	10	1	100.00	South Africa	Tanzania	High Performance Oval, Windhoek, Namibia	19 January 2026	Won	
168	Jason Rowles	125	101	10	5	123.76	South Africa	Tanzania	High Performance Oval, Windhoek, Namibia	19 January 2026	Won	
169	Will Malajczuk	102	55	12	5	185.45	Australia	Japan	Namibia Cricket Ground, Windhoek, Namibia	20 January 2026	Won	
170	Ben Mayes	191	117	18	8	163.24	England	Scotland	Takashinga Sports Club, Harare, Zimbabwe	21 January 2026	Won	
171	Zachary Carter	114	104	8	8	109.61	West Indies	South Africa	High Performance Oval, Windhoek, Namibia	22 January 2026	Won	
172	Adnit Jhamb	116*	93	17	1	124.73	United States	Scotland	Harare Sports Club, Harare, Zimbabwe	26 January 2026	Won	
173	Vihaan Malhotra	109*	107	7	0	101.86	India	Zimbabwe	Queens Sports Club, Bulawayo, Zimbabwe	27 January 2026	Won	
174	Oliver Peake	109	117	9	1	93.16	Australia	West Indies	Harare Sports Club, Harare, Zimbabwe	28 January 2026	Won	
175	Jorich Van Schalkwyk	116	130	13	2	89.23	South Africa	Sri Lanka	Queens Sports Club, Bulawayo, Zimbabwe	29 January 2026	Lost	
176	Viran Chamuditha	110	94	13	1	117.02	Sri Lanka	South Africa	Queens Sports Club, Bulawayo, Zimbabwe	29 January 2026	Won	
177	Faisal Shinozada	163	142	18	1	114.78	Afghanistan	Ireland	Harare Sports Club, Harare, Zimbabwe	30 January 2026	Won	
178	Thomas Rew	110	107	14	1	102.80	England	Australia	Queens Sports Club, Bulawayo, Zimbabwe	3 February 2026	Won	
179	Oliver Peake	100	88	10	1	113.63	Australia	England	Queens Sports Club, Bulawayo, Zimbabwe	3 February 2026	Lost	
180	Faisal Shinozada	110	93	15	0	118.27	Afghanistan	India	Harare Sports Club, Harare, Zimbabwe	4 February 2026	Lost	
181	Uzairullah Niazai	101*	86	12	2	117.44	Afghanistan	India	Harare Sports Club, Harare, Zimbabwe	4 February 2026	Lost	
182	Aaron George	115	104	15	2	110.57	India	Afghanistan	Harare Sports Club, Harare, Zimbabwe	4 February 2026	Won	
183	Vaibhav Sooryavanshi	175 †	80	15	15	218.75	India	England	Harare Sports Club, Harare, Zimbabwe	6 February 2026	Won	
184	Caleb Falconer	115 †	67	9	7	171.64	England	India	Harare Sports Club, Harare, Zimbabwe	6 February 2026	Lost	
