= Zimbabwean cricket team in England in 2025 =

International cricket tour

	England	Zimbabwe
- Dates: 22 – 25 May 2025
Captains	Ben Stokes	Craig Ervine

Test series
- Result: England won the 1-match series 1–0
Most runs	Ollie Pope (171)	Brian Bennett (140)
Most wickets	Shoaib Bashir (9)	Blessing Muzarabani (3)

The Zimbabwe cricket team toured England in May 2025 to play the England cricket team. The tour consisted of a four-day Test match. In August 2023, the England and Wales Cricket Board (ECB) announced the schedule for the Test match. The venue was confirmed as Trent Bridge on 22 August 2024.

It was the first Test match between the two teams since 2003, and only the second four-day Test match played by Zimbabwe. The tour also marked the first bilateral series between the two sides in any format since 2004. This was also the first match between the two teams since 2007.

On 26 July 2024, ECB chief executive Richard Gould announced that they would be offering Zimbabwe Cricket a touring fee of £150,000 for the one off test. The move was touted as a way to keep test cricket healthy in smaller nations. Zimbabwe Cricket became the first board in the modern era to be paid a "touring fee" by the host board in bilateral cricket.

== Squads ==
England	Zimbabwe
Ben Stokes (c); Gus Atkinson; Shoaib Bashir; Harry Brook; Sam Cook; ~~Jordan Cox (wk)~~; Zak Crawley; Ben Duckett; Ollie Pope; Matthew Potts; James Rew (wk); Joe Root; Jamie Smith (wk); Josh Tongue	Craig Ervine (c); Brian Bennett; Ben Curran; Tanaka Chivanga; ~~Trevor Gwandu~~; Clive Madande (wk); Wessly Madhevere; Wellington Masakadza; Blessing Muzarabani; Richard Ngarava; Newman Nyamhuri; Victor Nyauchi; Sikandar Raza; Tafadzwa Tsiga (wk); Nick Welch; Sean Williams

On 8 May, Jordan Cox was ruled out of the one-off Test match due to an abdominal muscle injury, with James Rew named as his replacement.

On 16 May, Trevor Gwandu was ruled out of the match due to a left groin strain during a training session, with Tanaka Chivanga named as his replacement.

== Tour match ==
15–18 May 2025
Scorecard

County Club Select XI	v	Zimbabweans
330 (71.2 overs); Josh de Caires 79 (92); Richard Ngarava 3/42 (13 overs)		403 (97.4 overs); Wessly Madhevere 93 (152); Mitchell Killeen 3/52 (17 overs)
464/7d (97 overs); Dan Mousley 154 (186); Newman Nyamhuri 3/74 (16 overs)		253 (66.5 overs); Nick Welch 87 (117); Eddie Jack 3/40 (9 overs)

County Club Select XI won by 138 runs
Grace Road, Leicester
Umpires: James Middlebrook (Eng) and Rob White (Eng)

- County Club Select XI won the toss and elected to bat.

== Only Test ==
22–24 May 2025
Scorecard

England	v	Zimbabwe
565/6d (96.3 overs); Ollie Pope 171 (166); Blessing Muzarabani 3/143 (24.3 overs)		265 (63.1 overs); Brian Bennett 139 (143); Shoaib Bashir 3/62 (16.4 overs)
		255 (59 overs) (f/o); Sean Williams 88 (82); Shoaib Bashir 6/81 (18 overs)

England won by an innings and 45 runs
Trent Bridge, Nottingham
Umpires: Kumar Dharmasena (SL) and Allahudien Paleker (SA)
Player of the match: Shoaib Bashir (Eng)

- Zimbabwe won the toss and elected to field.
- Sam Cook (Eng) made his Test debut.
- Zak Crawley (Eng) completed 3,000 runs in Tests.
- Joe Root (Eng) completed 13,000 runs in Tests.
- Shoaib Bashir became the youngest England spin bowler to take 50 wickets in Tests.
- Brian Bennett scored the fastest century for Zimbabwe in Tests (off 97 balls).
