= Faisal Shinozada =

Afghan cricketer (born 2008)

Personal information
- Full name: Faisal Khan Shinozada
- Born: 29 February 2008 (age 18); Kabul, Afghanistan
- Batting: Right-handed
- Role: Batsman

International information
- National side: Afghanistan
- T20I debut (cap 72): 25 September 2026 v Nepal
- Last T20I: 25 September 2026 v Nepal

Domestic team information
- Years: Team
- 2026–present: Pamir Legends

Career statistics
Competition	T20I	FC	LA	T20
Matches	1	2	7	16
Runs scored	30	127	195	276
Batting average	30.00	42.33	32.50	23.00
100s/50s	0/0	0/1	0/1	0/2
Top score	30	82	58	71
Catches/stumpings	2/–	2/0	8/0	10/0
- Source: Cricinfo, 19 November 2026

Faisal Shinozada (born 29 February 2008) is an Afghan cricketer who represents the Afghanistan national cricket team. A right-handed top-order batter, he rose to prominence during the 2026 Under-19 Cricket World Cup, finishing as Afghanistan's leading run-scorer with back-to-back centuries against Ireland and India, before making his Twenty20 International debut at the 2026 Asian Games.

== Career ==
He was named in Afghanistan's squad for the 2026 Under-19 Cricket World Cup, where he finished as the team's leading run-scorer with 435 runs in six matches, including centuries against Ireland (163) and India (110). He made his first-class debut for Pamir Legends in the 2026 Ahmad Shah Abdali 4-day Tournament on 29 August 2026.

He made his Twenty20 International (T20I) debut for Afghanistan against Nepal in the 2026 Asian Games on 25 September 2026.
