= Ayush Mhatre =

Indian cricketer (born 2007)

Personal information
- Born: 16 July 2007 (age 19); Nallasopara, Maharashtra, India
- Batting: Right-handed
- Bowling: Right-arm off break
- Role: Top order batter

Domestic team information
- Years: Team
- 2024–present: Mumbai
- 2025–present: Chennai Super Kings

Career statistics
Competition	FC	LA	T20
Matches	14	7	19
Runs scored	708	458	766
Batting average	30.78	65.42	47.87
100s/50s	2/2	2/1	2/4
Top score	176	181	110*
Balls bowled	39	105	6
Wickets	2	7	0
Bowling average	10.00	11.28	–
5 wickets in innings	0	0	0
10 wickets in match	0	0	0
Best bowling	1/8	3/17	–
Catches/stumpings	16/–	2/–	11/–
Medal record
Men's cricket
Representing India
ICC U19 World Cup
Winner	2026 Zimbabwe & Namibia
ACC U19 Asia Cup
Runner-up	2024 UAE
Runner-up	2025 UAE
- Source: Cricinfo, 24 October 2026

Ayush Mhatre (born 16 July 2007) is an Indian cricketer who plays for Mumbai in domestic cricket and Chennai Super Kings in the Indian Premier League as a right-handed top order batter.

== Early life ==
Mhatre was born in a Marathi-speaking family on 16 July 2007. He hails from Nallasopara, a locality near Virar in Maharashtra. He took to the game when he was six, but it was at fifteen that he transitioned to professional cricket. In his early days, he used to travel 46 km one way by train everyday from Virar to Churchgate (next to Wankhede Stadium) for his practice sessions.

== Youth career ==
Mhatre was part of the 2024 Indian U19 team and captained the 2025 squad, with the team finishing runners-up in the U19 Asia Cup in both editions. Under his captaincy, the Indian U19 team toured England, winning the Youth ODI series 3–2. The team later toured Australia, where they won the Youth ODI series 3–0 and secured a 2–0 win in the Youth Test series.

Mhatre was appointed captain of the India squad for the 2026 U19 World Cup, where he led the team to a record-extending sixth title. He finished the tournament with a total of 214 runs across 7 matches, which included crucial half-centuries in the semi-final against Afghanistan and the final against England.

== Domestic career ==
Mhatre made his first-class debut aged 17 for Mumbai in the 2024-25 Irani Cup. A few weeks later he scored his maiden first-class century (176) for Mumbai against Maharashtra in the 2024–25 Ranji Trophy. He became the then youngest player to score 150+ runs in men's List A cricket, surpassing the previous record set by Yashasvi Jaiswal.

Mhatre went unsold at the 2025 IPL auction; he was called up by the Chennai Super Kings as replacement of Ruturaj Gaikwad, who was injured mid-season. On 20 April 2025, Mhatre made his IPL debut for Chennai Super Kings against the Mumbai Indians. He is the seventh youngest IPL player to play a match, at 17 years and 278 days. On 3 May 2025, he scored 94 runs in 48 balls while chasing a total of 214 against RCB, missing his first ever IPL century by only 6 runs.
