= Eddie Jack =

English cricketer (born 2005)

Personal information
- Full name: Edward Vaughan Jack
- Born: 9 September 2005 (age 21); Barnet, London, England
- Height: 6 ft 4 in (193 cm)
- Batting: Left-handed
- Bowling: Right-arm fast-medium
- Role: All-rounder

Domestic team information
- Years: Team
- 2023–2026: Hampshire (squad no. 91)
- First-class debut: 30 May 2025 England Lions v India A
- List A debut: 1 August 2023 Hampshire v Middlesex

Career statistics
Competition	FC	LA	T20
Matches	18	26	9
Runs scored	292	102	38
Batting average	12.69	10.20	12.66
100s/50s	0/0	0/0	0/0
Top score	36	20	21
Balls bowled	2,240	1,158	156
Wickets	45	45	10
Bowling average	35.75	24.17	26.90
5 wickets in innings	0	0	0
10 wickets in match	0	0	0
Best bowling	4/36	4/29	2/43
Catches/stumpings	4/–	5/–	5/–
- Source: CricInfo, 18 November 2026

Edward Vaughan Jack (born 9 September 2005) is an English cricketer who plays for Hampshire County Cricket Club. He is a left handed batsman and right arm fast-medium bowler.

== Early life ==
From Wimborne in Dorset, Jack attended Canford School. In 2021 he captained South & West team at the ECB Bunbury Festival. In January 2022 he joined the academy at Hampshire County Cricket Club.

== Domestic career ==
Jack made his List A cricket debut for Hampshire on 1 August 2023 against Middlesex. During the 2023 One-Day Cup, reports suggested Jack impressed when taking 3 wickets against Yorkshire on 17 August 2023. In May 2025, he was called into a County Select XI to play the touring Zimbabwe national team in Leicester.

Jack signed a new three-year contract with Hampshire in November 2025, tying him into the club until at least the end of the 2028 season.

He was named in the England Lions squads for the 2026 series against South Africa A in both four day and 50 over cricket.

== International career ==
He featured for England U19 during the summer 2023 U19 Ashes series against Australia U19 with his best bowling figures being 4–62 in the first youth Test. Later that year, he was England U19s leading wicket taker in a quadrangular tournament in India, including a 5/57 haul against Bangladesh U19. In December 2023, he was selected for the England team for the 2024 Under-19 Cricket World Cup.

In October 2026, he was included in the England T20 squad for their white ball tour of Australia.
