= Isaac Mohammed =

English cricketer (born 2008)

Personal information
- Born: 30 April 2008 (age 18); Solihull, England
- Batting: Left-handed
- Bowling: Right arm medium
- Role: Batter
- Relatives: Moeen Ali (uncle)

Domestic team information
- Years: Team
- 2025–present: Worcestershire (squad no. 18)
- First-class debut: 20 September 2025 Worcestershire v Sussex
- List A debut: 7 August 2025 Worcestershire v Nottinghamshire

Career statistics
Competition	FC	LA	T20
Matches	1	9	19
Runs scored	9	175	347
Batting average	4.50	19.44	18.26
100s/50s	0/0	0/1	0/0
Top score	5	63	42
Catches/stumpings	1/–	4/–	10/–
- Source: Cricinfo, 11 August 2026

Isaac Mohammed (born 30 April 2008) is an English cricketer who plays for Worcestershire. He is a left-handed batsman and right arm medium pace bowler. He made his First-class, T20 Blast and List A cricket debut for the county in 2025.

== Domestic career ==
He was a member of the Warwickshire Academy, facing Yorkshire, Nottinghamshire, and many other junior sides, prior to signing for Worcestershire County Cricket Club on a three-year contract in 2025, immediately joining-up with the first team squad.

Mohammed made his professional debut for Worcestershire in the T20 Blast against Durham on 18 June as a 17-year-old. He made his debut in the One-Day Cup against Nottinghamshire on 7 August 2025, and made a half century in his second appearance on 10 August in a 60-run win against Essex. In September, he made his first-class debut against Sussex.

== International career ==
He made his debut for the England national under-19 cricket team against India U19 in 2025, hitting four sixes in a score of 42 on debut in June 2025. Later that summer, he scored a century against Bangladesh U19. He was selected for the England U19 tour of the Caribbean later that year. In December 2025, he was named in the England squad for the 2026 Under-19 Men's Cricket World Cup.

== Personal life ==
He is the nephew of England cricketer Moeen Ali.
