= Ralphie Albert =

English cricketer (born 2007)

Personal information
- Full name: Ralphie Beau Albert
- Born: 16 October 2007 (age 19); Epsom, Surrey, England
- Batting: Right-handed
- Bowling: Slow left arm orthodox
- Role: All-rounder
- Relatives: Jimmy White (grandfather)

Domestic team information
- Years: Team
- 2025–2026: Surrey (squad no. 22)
- FC debut: 24 September 2025 Surrey v Hampshire
- LA debut: 22 August 2025 Surrey v Derbyshire

Career statistics
Competition	FC	LA
Matches	3	8
Runs scored	68	110
Batting average	22.66	27.50
100s/50s	0/1	0/1
Top score	63	96
Balls bowled	339	300
Wickets	5	5
Bowling average	43.80	62.40
5 wickets in innings	0	0
10 wickets in match	0	0
Best bowling	3/80	3/48
Catches/stumpings	2/–	4/–
Medal record
Men's cricket
Representing England
ICC U19 World Cup
Runner-up	2026 Zimbabwe & Namibia
- Source: ESPNcricinfo, 27 September 2026

Ralphie Beau Albert (born 16 October 2007) is an English cricketer who plays for Surrey County Cricket Club and the England national under-19 cricket team. He is a right-handed batsman and slow left arm orthodox spin bowler.

== Early life ==
He played youth cricket for Banstead Cricket Club. He attended Epsom College, with whom he was 2024 Cricketer Schools 100 champions.

== Career ==
He featured for the England national under-19 cricket team in the summer of 2025 against India U19. His performances included scoring 50 batting at No.8 in the first innings of the first U19 Test, and in the second; taking ten wickets in the match.

He made his professional debut for Surrey County Cricket Club in the One-Day Cup against Derbyshire on 22 August 2025, although he did not bat and took no wickets in ten overs. He made an impression as a batsman in his maiden innings two days later when he scored 96 in a total of 289 for 8, and also later took two wickets with his left-arm spin as Surrey won by ten runs on 24 August against Nottinghamshire. It was the highest-ever individual score for a maiden List A innings for the county. He also made a half century on his first-class cricket debut, scoring 63 the following month away against Hampshire.

In December 2025, he was named in the England squad for the 2026 Under-19 Men's Cricket World Cup.

== Personal life ==
He is the grandson of professional snooker player Jimmy White, born to White's daughter Lauren. His father John was a club cricketer. He has an older brother, Sonny. He is a supporter of Chelsea.
