= James Rew =

English cricketer (born 2004)

Personal information
- Full name: James Edward Kenneth Rew
- Born: 11 January 2004 (age 22); Lambeth, London, England
- Batting: Left-handed
- Bowling: Slow left-arm orthodox
- Role: Wicket-keeper
- Relatives: Thomas Rew (brother)

International information
- National side: England (2026–present)
- Only Test (cap 723): 17 June 2026 v New Zealand

Domestic team information
- Years: Team
- 2021–present: Somerset (squad no. 55)
- 2025/26: Sharjah Warriorz
- 2026: London Spirit (squad no. 55)

Career statistics
Competition	Test	FC	LA	T20
Matches	1	71	49	34
Runs scored	39	4,225	1,918	929
Batting average	19.50	40.62	46.78	34.40
100s/50s	0/0	12/20	5/10	1/3
Top score	24	221	114	116*
Catches/stumpings	3/0	202/6	50/0	12/0
- Source: Cricinfo, 17 November 2026

James Edward Kenneth Rew (born 11 January 2004) is an English cricketer. In July 2021, Rew was named in the County Select XI squad to play a three-day match against India, during their tour of England. Rew made his first-class debut in the match on 20 July 2021. He made his List A debut on 1 August 2021, for Somerset in the 2021 Royal London One-Day Cup.

In December 2021, he was named in England's team for the 2022 ICC Under-19 Cricket World Cup in the West Indies. He made his Twenty20 debut on 27 May 2022, for Somerset against the Sri Lanka Cricket Development XI during their tour of England. In July 2022, in the County Championship match against Essex, Rew scored his maiden century in first-class cricket.

Rew was included in the England Lions squad to tour Australia in January 2025.

In May 2025, Rew became the youngest Englishman to score 10 first-class hundreds since Denis Compton in 1939. Later that month, he was called up to the England test squad as an injury replacement for Jordan Cox.
