= Steven Hogan =

Australian cricketer (born 2007)

Personal information
- Born: 16 September 2007 (age 19)
- Batting: Right-handed
- Bowling: Right-arm medium
- Role: Top-order batter

Domestic team information
- Years: Team
- 2026/27–present: Queensland
- Source: Cricinfo, 27 January 2026

Steven Hogan (born 16 September 2007) is an Australian cricketer.

Hogan attended school at St Patrick's College. He played grade cricket for Sandgate-Redcliffe in the Queensland Premier Cricket competition by the age of 16.

Hogan was part of the Australia under-19 squad for their multiformat tour of India in 2024/25. He was part of the Australian squad again when India toured Australia in 2025.

Hogan was named in the Australia squad for the 2026 Under-19 Men's Cricket World Cup. In Australia's first game against Ireland, Hogan hit a century, finishing with 115 runs off 111 balls, as he guided Australia to victory.

Hogan received his first state contract with Queensland for the 2026-27 season, signing a rookie contract.
