= England under-19 cricket team =

National cricket team

England
- Association: England and Wales Cricket Board

Personnel
- Captain: Luc Benkenstein and Hamza Shaikh
- Coach: Michael Yardy

Team information
- Colors: Red and Blue
- Founded: 1974; 52 years ago
- Home ground: Lord’s

History
- ICC Under-19 Cricket World Cup wins: (gold) 1 (1998)

International Cricket Council
- ICC region: Europe
Test kit
ODI kit
T20I kit
- As of 9 February 2024

The England Under-19 cricket team represents England and Wales in international cricket, have been playing official Under-19 Test matches since 1974. Prior to 1991/92 they were known as England Young Cricketers.

Former captains include Mike Atherton, Michael Vaughan, Alastair Cook and Andrew Flintoff, who have all gone on to captain the senior national team in Test matches after playing for this team.

== Recent call-ups ==
This lists all the players who have been selected for England under-19s since the start of the 2025 season and their most recent call-up. In that period squads have been named for:

- A home ODI series against India in June/July 2025
- A home Test series against India in July 2025
- A home ODI series against Ireland in September 2025
- A home ODI series against Bangladesh in September 2025
- An away ODI series against West Indies in November/December 2025
- The 2026 Under-19 Cricket World Cup squad in Zimbabwe and Namibia in January/February 2026

Michael Yardy has been the team's coach since October 2022.

Name	Age	Primary role	Batting style	Bowling style	County	Most Recent Call-up
Ralphie Albert	16 October 2007 (age 18)	All-rounder	Right-handed	Left-arm orthodox spin	Surrey	2026 Under-19 World Cup
Tazeem Ali	13 June 2006 (age 20)	Spin bowler	Right-handed	Right-arm off-break	Warwickshire	2025 v India (h)
Will Bennison	10 September 2006 (age 19)	Batter	Right-handed	Right-arm leg-break	Yorkshire	2026 Under-19 World Cup
Ben Dawkins	19 October 2006 (age 19)	Wicket-keeper	Right-handed	—	Kent	2026 Under-19 World Cup
Jaydn Denly	5 January 2006 (age 20)	All-rounder	Left-handed	Left-arm orthodox spin	Kent	2025 v India (h)
Caleb Falconer	14 September 2006 (age 19)	Batter	Right-handed	Right-arm fast-medium	Middlesex	2026 Under-19 World Cup
Farhan Ahmed	22 February 2008 (age 18)	Spin bowler	Right-handed	Right-arm off-break	Nottinghamshire	2026 Under-19 World Cup
Ali Farooq	12 March 2007 (age 19)	Spin bowler	Right-handed	Left-arm orthodox spin	Leicestershire	2026 Under-19 World Cup
James Feldman	13 June 2007 (age 19)	Pace bowler	Right-handed	Right-arm fast-medium	Middlesex	2025/26 v West Indies (a) †
Matthew Firbank	15 March 2007 (age 19)	Pace bowler	Right-handed	Right-arm fast-medium	Yorkshire	2025/26 v West Indies (a) †
Rocky Flintoff	7 April 2008 (age 18)	Batter	Right-handed	Right-arm fast-medium	Lancashire	2025 v India (h)
Alex French	23 July 2007 (age 19)	Pace bowler	Right-handed	Right-arm fast-medium	Surrey	2026 Under-19 World Cup
Alex Green	24 February 2007 (age 19)	Pace bowler	Right-handed	Right-arm medium-fast	Leicestershire	2026 Under-19 World Cup
Luke Hands	14 November 2008 (age 17)	Pace bowler	Right-handed	Right-arm medium-fast	Lancashire	2026 Under-19 World Cup
Byron Hatton-Lowe	13 December 2006 (age 19)	All-rounder	Right-handed	Right-arm fast-medium	Nottinghamshire	2025 v Bangladesh (h)
Joe Hawkins	7 March 2007 (age 19)	All-rounder	Right-handed	Right-arm off-break	Derbyshire	2025 v Bangladesh (h)
Jack Home	2 May 2006 (age 20)	Pace bowler	Right-handed	Right-arm medium-fast	Worcestershire	2025 v India (h)
James Isbell	10 January 2007 (age 19)	Batter	Right-handed	Right-arm leg-break	Middlesex	2025 v Bangladesh (h)
Manny Lumsden	3 November 2008 (age 17)	Pace bowler	Right-handed	Right-arm fast-medium	Hampshire	2026 Under-19 World Cup
Ben Mayes	21 November 2007 (age 18)	Wicket-keeper	Right-handed	Right-arm medium	Hampshire	2026 Under-19 World Cup
James Minto	26 November 2007 (age 18)	Pace bowler	Left-handed	Left-arm fast-medium	Durham	2026 Under-19 World Cup
Isaac Mohammed	30 April 2008 (age 18)	Batter	Right-handed	Right-arm medium	Worcestershire	2026 Under-19 World Cup †
Joe Moores	15 September 2008 (age 17)	Wicket-keeper	Left-handed	—	Lancashire	2026 Under-19 World Cup
Sebastian Morgan	30 August 2007 (age 18)	All-rounder	Right-handed	Right-arm fast-medium	Middlesex	2026 Under-19 World Cup
Jack Nelson	21 May 2008 (age 18)	Batter	Right-handed	Right-arm leg-break	Middlesex	2025/26 v West Indies (a)
Thomas Rew	29 November 2007 (age 18)	Wicket-keeper	Right-handed	—	Somerset	2026 Under-19 World Cup
Aaryan Sawant	15 November 2005 (age 20)	Batter	Right-handed	Right-arm off-break	Middlesex	2025 v India (h)
Hamza Shaikh	29 May 2006 (age 20)	Batter	Right-handed	Right-arm leg-break	Warwickshire	2025 v India (h)
Ekansh Singh	16 July 2006 (age 20)	Batter	Right-handed	Right-arm medium	Kent	2025 v India (h)
Jay Singh	17 December 2006 (age 19)	Pace bowler	Right-handed	Right-arm fast-medium	Yorkshire	2025/26 v West Indies (a)
Charlie Taylor	7 December 2009 (age 16)	Pace bowler	Right-handed	Right-arm fast-medium	Warwickshire	2025/26 v West Indies (a)
Archie Vaughan	9 December 2005 (age 20)	All-rounder	Right-handed	Right-arm off-break	Somerset	2025 v India (h)
Alex Wade	28 November 2006 (age 19)	Pace bowler	Right-handed	Right-arm fast-medium	Yorkshire	2025 v India (h)

† = withdrew injured

== Tournament history ==
A red box around the year indicates tournaments played within England

Key
Champions
Runners-up
Semi-finals

=== U-19 World Cup ===
England's U19 World Cup record
Year	Result	Pos	№	Pld	W	L	T	NR
(Australia) 1988	Semi-final	4th	8	8	4	4	0	0
(South Africa) 1998	Champions	1st	16	7	5	2	0	0
(Sri Lanka) 2000	Group Stage	6th	16	6	3	3	0	0
(New Zealand) 2002	Group Stage	7th	16	6	2	4	0	0
(Bangladesh) 2004	Semi-finals	4th	16	7	5	2	0	0
(Sri Lanka) 2006	Semi-finals	4th	16	5	3	2	0	0
(Malaysia) 2008	Quarter-finals	5th	16	6	3	2	0	1
(New Zealand) 2010	Quarter-finals	8th	16	6	3	3	0	0
(Australia) 2012	Quarter-finals	5th	16	6	4	2	0	0
(United Arab Emirates) 2014	Semi-finals	3rd	16	6	4	2	0	0
(Bangladesh) 2016	Quarter-finals	6th	16	6	4	2	0	0
(New Zealand) 2018	Quarter-finals	7th	16	5	3	2	0	0
(South Africa) 2020	Group Stage	9th	16	6	4	2	0	0
(Cricket West Indies) 2022	Runners-up	2nd	16	5	4	1	0	0
(South Africa) 2024	Super 6	6th	16	7	4	3	0	0
(Zimbabwe) (Namibia) 2026	Runners-up	2nd	16	7	6	1	0	0
Total	1 titles			99	61	37	0	1
