= Vihaan Malhotra =

Indian cricketer (born 2007)

Vihaan Molhotra
Personal information
- Full name: Vihaan Manoj Malhotra
- Born: 1 January 2007 (age 19); Patiala, Punjab, India
- Batting: Left-handed
- Bowling: Right-arm Offbreak
- Role: All-rounder

Domestic team information
- Years: Team
- 2026/27–present: Punjab
- 2026: Royal Challengers Bengaluru

Career statistics
Competition	FC	T20
Matches	4	3
Runs scored	244	118
Batting average	40.66	39.33
100s/50s	1/1	/1
Top score	103	86
Catches/stumpings	4/	1/-
Medal record
Men's cricket
Representing India
ICC U19 World Cup
Winner	2026 Zimbabwe & Namibia
ACC U19 Asia Cup
Runner-up	2025 UAE
- Source: cricinfo, 18 November 2026

Vihaan Manoj Malhotra (born 1 January 2007) is an Indian cricketer who plays as All-rounder.

== Early life ==
Malhotra was born on 1 January 2007 in Patiala, Punjab. His father, Manoj, an Engineer and while his mother, Poonam, is a Doctor.

== Youth career ==
Malhotra played age-group cricket for Punjab Cricket Association and featured in national junior tournaments.

He was the Vice-captain of the Indian squad that were runners-up at the 2025 U19 Asia Cup.

Malhotra was named the vice-captain of the Indian squad for the 2026 U19 World Cup. During India's successful World Cup campaign, Malhotra took 5 wickets and scored 240 runs across 7 matches, which included crucial 109* in the super-six against Zimbabwe.

== Domestic career ==
He was purchased by the Royal Challengers Bengaluru ahead of the 2026 Indian Premier League for ₹30 Lakh in the auction. His First class debut was on 11 October 2026 against Assam.
