= Azizul Hakim Tamim =

Bangladeshi cricketer

Azizul Hakim
Personal information
- Born: 5 May 2007 (age 19); Dhaka, Bangladesh
- Nickname: Tamim
- Batting: Left-handed
- Bowling: Right-arm off-spin

Domestic team information
- Years: Team
- 2024/25: Gulshan Cricket Club
- 2024/25: Rangpur Riders
- 2025/26: Mymensingh Division
- LA debut: 3 March 2025 Gulshan v Mohammedan SC

Career statistics
| Competition | FC | LA | T20 |
|---|---|---|---|
| Matches | 6 | 19 | 13 |
| Runs scored | 469 | 710 | 242 |
| Batting average | 58.62 | 37.36 | 18.61 |
| 100s/50s | 1/3 | 1/5 | 0/2 |
| Top score | 142 | 105 | 66 |
| Balls bowled | 222 | 514 | 24 |
| Wickets | 3 | 14 | 0 |
| Bowling average | 40.33 | 31.28 | – |
| 5 wickets in innings | 0 | 0 | 0 |
| 10 wickets in match | 0 | – | – |
| Best bowling | 2/31 | 3/20 | – |
| Catches/stumpings | 10/– | 6/– | 7/– |
Medal record
Men's Cricket
Representing Bangladesh
ACC U-19 Asia Cup
| Winner | 2024 UAE |
- Source: Cricinfo, 31 October 2026

Azizul Hakim Tamim (Bengali: আজিজুল হাকিম তামিম; born 5 May 2007) is a Bangladeshi cricketer from Dhaka.

Azizul is an all-rounder: a left-handed upper-order batter and right-arm off-spin bowler.

== Domestic career ==
Although he was only 17 years old, Azizul was chosen to captain Gulshan Cricket Club when they made their debut in List A cricket in the 2024–25 Dhaka Premier Division Cricket League in March 2025. They won their first match, against Mohammedan SC, by 107 runs. He won the player of the match award in consecutive victories for Gulshan: on 9 April he took 3 for 20 off 10 overs to help Gulshan to a five-run victory over Shinepukur, and on 12 April he scored 105 off 106 balls to lead Gulshan to a five-wicket victory over Prime Bank.

== International career ==
=== Youth ===
Azizul captained the Bangladesh under-19 team to victory in the final of the 2024 ACC Under-19 Asia Cup in December 2024. He took the last three wickets in three overs to give Bangladesh victory over India by 59 runs. Azizul captained the Bangladesh under-19 team that toured Sri Lanka in April and May 2025. Bangladesh won the six-match series of 50-over matches against Sri Lanka under-19 3–2, with one match drawn. Azizul scored 281 runs at an average of 70.25, and took five wickets at 16.20.

Azizul captained Bangladesh under-19 in the Under-19 World Cup in January–February 2026.
