= Malibongwe Maketa =

South African cricketer

Personal information
- Born: 6 October 1980 (age 46); Port Elizabeth, South Africa
- Batting: Right-handed
- Bowling: Right-arm medium
- Role: Bowler

Domestic team information
- Years: Team
- 2001: Border

Head coaching information
- Years: Team
- 2022–2023: South Africa (interim)
- 2026–: Bangladesh (assistant)
- Source: CricketArchive, 25 November 2015

Malibongwe "Mali" Maketa (born 6 October 1980) is a former South African cricketer who represented Border in South African domestic cricket. He was the interim head coach for South Africa's three-match Test tour of Australia in 2022. After stints as head assistant coach of the South African men's national team and heading up the SA 'A' setup and the national academy.

Maketa was born in Port Elizabeth, and raised in King William's Town, where he attended Dale College. A former South Africa under-15s representative, he made his sole first-class appearance for Border in October 2001, in a Supersport Series match against Free State. Maketa played a further two seasons for Border B, but never returned to the senior line-up.

After the conclusion of his playing career, Maketa began coaching at school level, with his first position being at Western Province Preparatory School working alongside the renowned Paul Nel where he learnt his trade. Entering the domestic set-up, he was appointed assistant coach to the Titans franchise for the 2006–07 season (under head coach Richard Pybus), and in May 2008 was named head coach of the Northerns provincial team. During his tenure as coach, Northerns won two CSA Provincial titles, winning the one-day competition during the 2010–11 season and the Twenty20 competition the following season. In May 2012, Maketa returned to the Titans franchise as an assistant coach to Matthew Maynard. He switched to the Warriors franchise in 2013, as assistant to Piet Botha, and on Botha's resignation in December 2014 was appointed acting head coach. He was permanently appointed to the position in February 2015, becoming only the third black head coach of a franchise team, after Geoffrey Toyana and Paul Adams. In September 2015, Maketa gained his level-four coaching certificate from Cricket South Africa, the highest qualification available in the country.

In September 2026, he was appointed as assistant coach of Bangladesh cricket team.
