= Will Malajczuk =

Australian cricketer (born 2007)

Personal information
- Born: 23 September 2007 (age 19)
- Batting: Right-handed
- Bowling: Right-arm off break
- Role: Top-order batter

Domestic team information
- Years: Team
- 2025/26–present: Western Australia (squad no. 32)

Career statistics
Competition	LA
Matches	6
Runs scored	71
Batting average	14.20
100s/50s	0/0
Top score	24
Balls bowled	156
Wickets	3
Bowling average	55.00
5 wickets in innings	0
10 wickets in match	0
Best bowling	2/48
Catches/stumpings	4/–
- Source: Cricinfo, 25 October 2026

Will Malajczuk (born 23 September 2007) is an Australian cricketer who plays for Western Australia. He is a left-handed batter and right arm off break bowler.

== Early life ==
From Wembley Downs in Perth, Western Australia, Malajczuk plays club cricket for Subiaco-Floreat Cricket Club. An all-round sportsman, he also played for Claremont Football Club in the WAFL colts and had to decide between pursuing Australian rules football and cricket as his primary sport.

== Career ==
Malajczuk captained Western Australia during the Australian U19 National Championships in the 2025-26 season. In 2025, he made his debut for the Australia national under-19 cricket team against India U19, and also captained the side on occasion that year. He was named in the senior Western Australia cricket team squad for a one-day match in Adelaide against South Australia in September 2025 without making his debut. Later that year, Malajczuk trained with the senior Australia team ahead of the Ashes Test match in Perth.

Malajczuk was named in the Australia squad for the 2026 Under-19 Men's Cricket World Cup. During the group stage of the tournament he hit the fastest century in tournament history, striking an unbeaten century from 51 balls against Japan.

He made his List A debut for Western Australia against Tasmania on 10 February 2026. Malajczuk received his first state contract the following season, elevated straight to a full contract.
