= Manny Lumsden =

English cricketer (born 2008)

Personal information
- Full name: Emmanuel Tait Lumsden
- Born: 3 November 2008 (age 18); Basingstoke, Hampshire, England
- Height: 5 ft 11 in (180 cm)
- Batting: Right-handed
- Bowling: Right-arm fast-medium
- Role: Bowler

Domestic team information
- Years: Team
- 2025–2026: Hampshire (squad no. 43)
- 2026: Southern Brave (squad no. 43)
- First-class debut: 8 September 2026 Hampshire v Nottinghamshire
- List A debut: 5 August 2025 Hampshire v Glamorgan

Career statistics
Competition	FC	LA	T20
Matches	2	4	6
Runs scored	72	1	0
Batting average	18.00	–	0.00
100s/50s	0/0	0/0	0/0
Top score	31	1*	0
Balls bowled	261	202	104
Wickets	9	10	5
Bowling average	30.77	23.40	38.00
5 wickets in innings	1	0	0
10 wickets in match	0	0	0
Best bowling	5/36	4/60	2/26
Catches/stumpings	1/–	4/–	0/–
Medal record
Men's cricket
Representing England
ICC U19 World Cup
Runner-up	2026 Zimbabwe & Namibia
- Source: ESPNCricInfo, 26 September 2026

Emmanuel "Manny" Tait Lumsden (born 3 November 2008) is an English cricketer who plays for Hampshire County Cricket Club. He is a right-handed batsman and right-arm medium fast bowler.

== Early life ==
Born in Basingstoke, his father, Audley Lumsden played rugby union for Bath Rugby, with whom he was a league winner and scored 64 tries in over 120 games, and later coached at Gloucester Rugby and Lord Wandsworth College in Hook, Hampshire. Lumsden played youth cricket in North Hampshire for Hook & Newnham Basics.

== Domestic career ==
Lumsden made his List-A cricket debut for Hampshire against Glamorgan on 5 August 2025 as a 16 year-old, taking the wickets of three of Glamorgan top five batsmen on debut, earning praise from Hampshire captain Nick Gubbins for the pace he showed on debut. In his third match, he helped Hampshire reach the semi finals of the 2025 One-Day Cup with a win over Gloucestershire.

== International career ==
In September 2025, he was called-up for the first time for the England national under-19 cricket team, ahead of matches against Bangladesh and Ireland under-19 teams. In December 2025, he was named in the England squad for the 2026 Under-19 Men's Cricket World Cup. His performances included taking 5-17 against New Zealand in the Super Six stage to help England into the semi-finals.

== Personal life ==
He is of Jamaican descent through his father, who was born on the island.
