= Sebastian Morgan =

English cricketer

Personal information
- Full name: Sebastian Herbert Bache Morgan
- Born: 30 August 2007 (age 19); Málaga, Spain
- Batting: Right-handed
- Bowling: Right-arm fast-medium
- Role: All-rounder

Domestic team information
- Years: Team
- 2025–2026: Middlesex (squad no. 16)
- First-class debut: 8 September 2025 Middlesex v Derbyshire
- List A debut: 19 August 2025 Middlesex v Kent

Career statistics
Competition	FC	LA	T20
Matches	11	5	8
Runs scored	297	69	45
Batting average	22.84	34.50	22.50
100s/50s	0/2	0/1	0/0
Top score	97	61	19*
Balls bowled	1,659	233	109
Wickets	35	11	6
Bowling average	31.82	19.45	32.66
5 wickets in innings	1	0	0
10 wickets in match	0	0	0
Best bowling	5/104	4/46	2/34
Catches/stumpings	2/–	3/–	3/–
Medal record
Men's cricket
Representing England
ICC U19 World Cup
Runner-up	2026 Zimbabwe & Namibia
- Source: Cricinfo, 27 September 2026

Sebastian Herbert Bache Morgan (born 30 August 2007) is an English cricketer who plays for Middlesex.

== Early life ==
Morgan was born in Málaga, Spain. He attended Winchester College from the age of 13.

== Career ==
Morgan signed his first professional contract for Middlesex in November 2024, having been a part of the club's youth system since under-12s level. Whilst in the academy set up, Morgan had played for England under-19s, and was part of the squad selected for the 2024 Under-19 Cricket World Cup.

Morgan made his senior debut on 11 July 2025 against Gloucestershire in the T20 Blast. He made his List-A debut on 19 August 2025, taking 3 wickets in a victory over Kent in the One-Day Cup.
