= Aaron George =

Indian cricketer (born 2006)

Personal information
- Full name: Aaron George Varghese
- Born: 1 October 2006 (age 20); Kottayam, Kerala, India
- Batting: Right-handed
- Bowling: Right-arm medium
- Role: Top-order batter
Medal record
Men's cricket
Representing India
ICC U19 World Cup
Winner	2026 Zimbabwe & Namibia
ACC U19 Asia Cup
Runner-up	2025 UAE
- Source: ESPNcricinfo, 7 February 2026

Aaron George Varghese (born 1 October 2006) is an Indian cricketer who plays as a top-order batsman.

== Early life ==
George was born on 1 October 2006 in Kottayam, Kerala and grew up in Hyderabad. His father, Easo, a former sub-inspector in the Hyderabad Police, was an aspiring cricketer who played as a left-arm spinner, while his mother, Preethi, is a mathematics teacher. He has one sister, Ananya, who is a lawyer.

== Youth career ==
George played age-group cricket for Hyderabad and featured in national junior tournaments, including the Vinoo Mankad Trophy.

He was part of the Indian squad that were runners-up at the 2025 U19 Asia Cup. In the opening group match of the tournament, he scored a half-century as India posted a high total and secured a large-margin victory. In a subsequent group-stage match against Pakistan, he scored 85 runs, anchoring the innings after early wickets fell. His performance was noted for composure and shot selection under pressure.

George was part of the Indian squad that won the 2026 U19 World Cup. He finished the tournament with a total of 231 runs across 6 matches, which included a crucial century in the semi-final against Afghanistan.
