= James Minto =

English cricketer (born 2007)

Personal information
- Born: 26 November 2007 (age 18); Norton, County Durham, England
- Batting: Left-handed
- Bowling: Left-arm fast-medium
- Role: All-rounder

Domestic team information
- Years: Team
- 2024–present: Durham (squad no. 77)
- FC debut: 17 September 2024 Durham v Surrey
- List A debut: 28 July 2024 Durham v Worcestershire

Career statistics
Competition	FC	LA	T20
Matches	7	10	1
Runs scored	177	62	9
Batting average	25.28	62.00	–
100s/50s	0/1	0/0	0/0
Top score	67	30*	9*
Balls bowled	572	396	12
Wickets	14	11	0
Bowling average	27.92	42.18	–
5 wickets in innings	1	0	–
10 wickets in match	0	0	–
Best bowling	5/21	3/45	–
Catches/stumpings	2/–	2/–	1/–
Medal record
Men's cricket
Representing England
ICC U19 World Cup
Runner-up	2026 Zimbabwe & Namibia
- Source: Cricinfo, 12 August 2026

James Minto (born 26 November 2007) is an English cricketer who plays for Durham. He is a left arm bowler and left-handed batter.

== Career ==
Minto was raised in Norton, County Durham, where he played for the local cricket club at junior level before joining their first team at the age of 13. He signed with Durham's academy in December 2023. In June 2024, he played for England Young Lions.

Minto made his List A debut on 28 July 2024, against Worcestershire in the One-Day Cup, taking two wickets in the match. Aged 16 years 296 days, on 17 September 2024 he became the youngest first-class player in Durham's history, when he took to the field at the Oval against Surrey in the County Championship. In that match, he became the second youngest player (after Craig Miles for Gloucestershire) to take a first-class wicket since World War II.

Minto signed his first professional contract with Durham in May 2025. Later that month he scored his maiden first-class half-century, making 67 after being sent in to open the batting as nightwatchman against Nottinghamshire at the Riverside Ground. Aged 17 years and 172 days he became the county's youngest ever half-centurion.

On 19 October 2026, Minto agreed a two-year extension to his contract with Durham, tying him into the club until at least the end of the 2028 season.
