= Iqbal Hossain Emon =

Bangladeshi cricketer (born 2006)

Personal information
- Full name: Md Iqbal Hossain Emon
- Born: 5 December 2006 (age 19); Moulvibazar, Sylhet, Bangladesh
- Batting: Right-handed
- Bowling: Right-arm medium
- Role: Bowler

Domestic team information
- Years: Team
- 2024/25: Fortune Barishal

Career statistics
Competition	LA	T20
Matches	9	7
Runs scored	28	6
Batting average	4.66	6.00
100s/50s	0/0	0/0
Top score	19*	6*
Balls bowled	342	144
Wickets	4	7
Bowling average	87.00	28.14
5 wickets in innings	0	0
10 wickets in match	–	–
Best bowling	2/104	3/26
Catches/stumpings	2/–	4/–
Medal record
Men's Cricket
Representing Bangladesh
ACC U-19 Asia Cup
Winner	2024 UAE
- Source: ESPNcricinfo, 1 December 2025

Iqbal Hossain Emon (Bengali: ইকবাল হোসেন ইমন; born 5 December 2006) is a Bangladeshi cricketer. He plays as a right arm medium bowler.

== Domestic career ==
Emon made his list A debut for Gazi Tyres Cricket Academy in the 2023–24 Dhaka Premier Division Cricket League on 14 March 2024.

He made his Twenty20 debut on 12 December 2024 for Dhaka Division in the 2024–25 National Cricket League Twenty20.

In January 2025, he was selected to play for Fortune Barishal in the 2025 Bangladesh Premier League.

== International career ==
=== U19 ===
In November 2024, he was named in Bangladesh's squad, for the 2024 Under-19 Cricket World Cup squads. Iqbal Hossain Emon named player of the match for his 13 wicket.
