= Ben Mayes (cricketer) =

English cricketer (born 2007)

Personal information
- Full name: Ben Angus Mayes
- Born: 21 November 2007 (age 18); Southampton, Hampshire, England
- Batting: Right-handed
- Bowling: Right-arm off break
- Role: Middle order batter

Domestic team information
- Years: Team
- 2025–present: Hampshire (squad no. 21)
- 2026: Trent Rockets
- FC debut: 3 April 2026 Hampshire v Essex
- LA debut: 5 August 2025 Hampshire v Glamorgan

Career statistics
Competition	FC	LA	T20
Matches	11	20	16
Runs scored	522	537	215
Batting average	24.85	41.30	26.87
100s/50s	1/1	1/3	0/1
Top score	105	109	55*
Catches/stumpings	11/0	19/2	4/–
Medal record
Men's cricket
Representing England
ICC U19 World Cup
Runner-up	2026 Zimbabwe & Namibia
- Source: Cricinfo, 17 November 2026

Ben Angus Mayes (born 21 November 2007) is an English cricketer who plays for Hampshire County Cricket Club. He is a right-handed batsman, a wicket-keeper and right-arm off spin bowler.

== Career ==
Mayes played junior club cricket for Lyndhurst and Ashurst CC and Totton and Eling CC in Hampshire and joined the Hampshire County Cricket Club talent pathway as an Under 8, making his Hampshire Academy debut in May 2023, at the age of 15 years-old. He was a member of the Hampshire Academy squad that won the Southern Premier League title for the first time, in 2024.

Mayes made his youth international debut against Ireland in September 2024. He toured with the England national under-19 cricket team to South Africa in January 2025 and earned the Player of the Match award in the first Youth ODI. He scored two half-centuries representing England U19 against India U19 in the summer of 2025.

In July 2025, he signed his first professional contract with Hampshire, agreeing a deal until the end of the 2027 season. He made a half century on his professional debut in the One Day Cup for Hampshire against Glamorgan on 5 August 2025, at the age of 17 years-old, scoring 74 off 55 balls. He made a match-winning 62 not out in that competition against Derbyshire, on 24 August. He shared a stand of 89 with Liam Dawson as Hampshire won their One-Day Cup semi-final against Yorkshire on 31 August 2025.

In December 2025, he was named in the England squad for the 2026 Under-19 Men's Cricket World Cup. In the final group stage match against Scotland, Mayes scored 191 from 117 balls, an England record in Youth ODI matches.

Mayes made his England Lions debut in a two test series against South Africa A on 22 May 2026, scoring a debut first class century in the first match. A debut List A century for Hampshire against Sussex CC came later that summer and Mayes was part of the Trent Rockets squad that reached The Hundred final.

Mayes was an U16 England hockey international and played junior representative golf and squash for Hampshire.

== Personal life ==
Mayes attended King Edward VI School in Southampton.
