= Caleb Falconer =

English cricketer

Personal information
- Full name: Caleb Matthew Falconer
- Born: 14 February 2006 (age 20); Gqeberha, South Africa
- Batting: Right-handed
- Bowling: Right arm medium

Domestic team information
- Years: Team
- 2026: Middlesex (squad no. 23)
- 2026: Southern Brave (squad no. 44)
- First-class debut: 8 May 2026 Middlesex v Lancashire
- T20 debut: 22 May 2026 Middlesex v Kent

Career statistics
Competition	FC	LA	T20
Matches	6	2	6
Runs scored	211	76	32
Batting average	19.18	38.00	10.66
100s/50s	0/0	0/0	0/0
Top score	49	45	16
Catches/stumpings	3/–	0/–	2/–
- Source: ESPNcricinfo, 27 September 2026

Caleb Matthew Falconer (born 14 September 2006) is an English cricketer who plays for Middlesex. He is a right-handed batter and right arm fast medium pace bowler. He made his first-class debut for Middlesex on 8 May 2026. He was purchased by Southern Brave in the player auction for the 2026 The Hundred season.

== Career ==
Born in Gqeberha, South Africa, Falconer attended Herbert Hurd Primary School and scored three successive centuries at a junior level. He was also educated at Grey High School in South Africa. With his family, he moved to Berkshire when he was a teenager and attended Millfield in Somerset. Playing for Middlesex U18s in 2024, he scored 1,062 runs with his haul including a double century against Sussex, and he was named Middlesex Youth Player of the Year. That summer, he also scored 130 in the Second-XI Championship against Lancashire. He subsequently signed an academy contract with Middlesex County Cricket Club in 2025.

Falconer played for England U19 at the 2026 U19 World Cup, scoring a century in the final against India from 63 balls, in February 2026. The following month, he was purchased by Southern Brave in the player auction ahead of the 2026 The Hundred season, with Falconer becoming the first player to sign a men's Hundred deal before making their senior county debut. Falconer scored an unbeaten 177 for the Middlesex second-XI against Surrey on 24 April 2026, before striking a second hundred in as many matches for the second-XI the following week against Hampshire. He made his first-class debut for Middlesex on 8 May 2026 against Lancashire.

He was named in the England Lions squad for the 2026 50-overs series against South Africa A.
