= Thomas Rew (cricketer) =

English cricketer (born 2007)

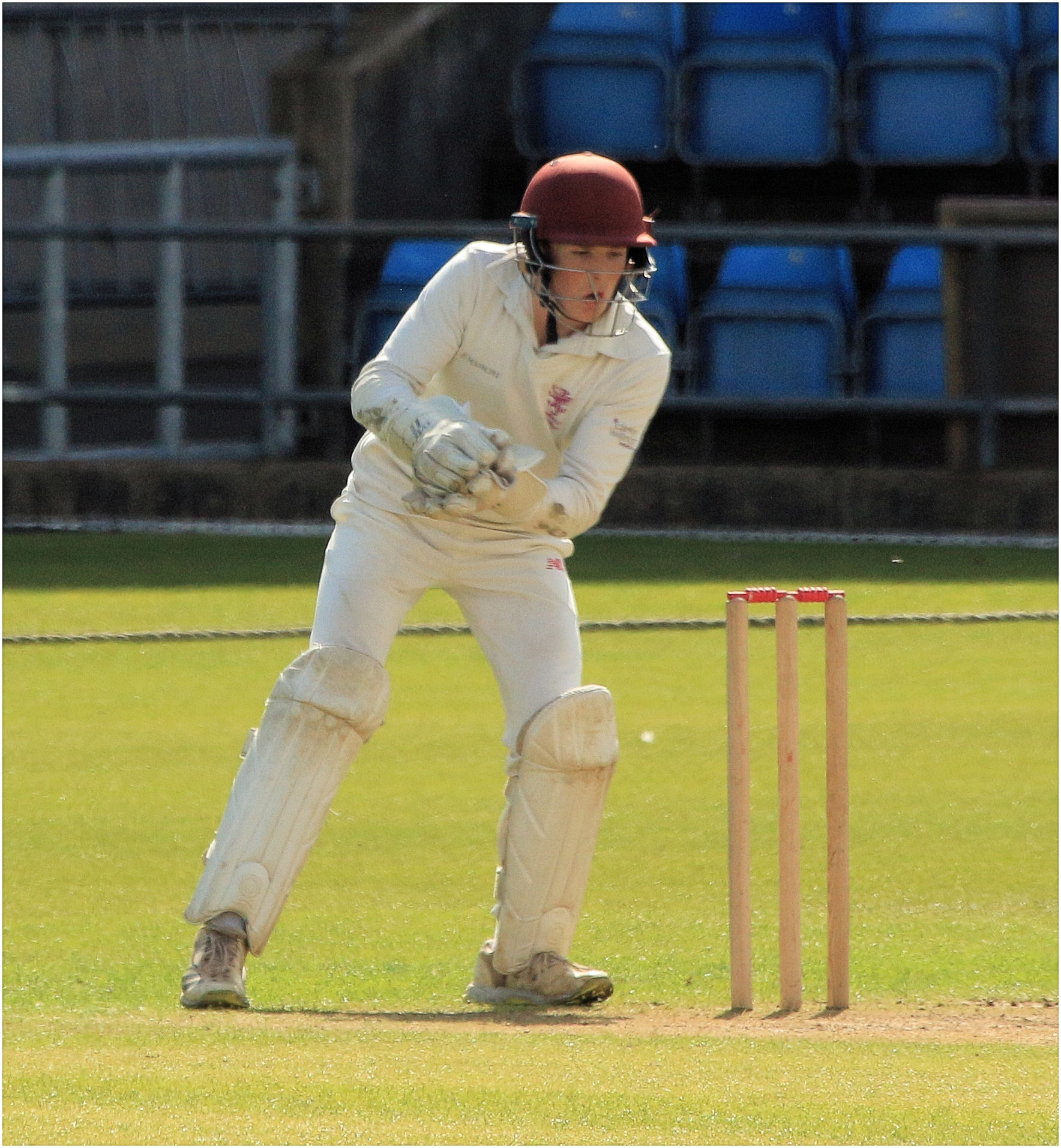
- Rew in 2024

Personal information
- Full name: Thomas Henry Sidney Rew
- Born: 29 November 2007 (age 18); Lambeth, London, England
- Batting: Right-handed
- Role: Wicket-keeper
- Relatives: James Rew (brother)

Domestic team information
- Years: Team
- 2025–2026: Somerset (squad no. 45)
- 2026: Southern Brave (squad no. 45)
- FC debut: 5 December 2025 England Lions v Australia A
- LA debut: 27 July 2025 PCC XI v Pakistan Shaheens

Career statistics
Competition	FC	LA	T20
Matches	4	15	21
Runs scored	475	391	389
Batting average	67.85	35.54	24.31
100s/50s	2/1	0/2	0/2
Top score	149	82*	57
Catches/stumpings	5/1	8/0	13/2
Medal record
Men's cricket
Representing England
ICC U19 World Cup
Runner-up	2026 Zimbabwe & Namibia
- Source: Cricinfo, 12 November 2026

Thomas Henry Sidney Rew (born 29 November 2007) is an English cricketer. He is a right-handed batsman and wicket keeper.

== Domestic career ==
A right handed batsman and wicket keeper he joined the academy at Somerset County Cricket Club ahead of the 2023 season. At the start of the 2025 season he captained the Somerset second-XI. In May 2025, he was called into a County Select XI to play Zimbabwe, during their tour of England, in Leicester, scoring an unbeaten 103 from 107 balls in the second innings. He signed a short-term professional contract with Somerset in May 2025. He made his professional debut for Somerset in the T20 Blast on 30 May 2025 against Surrey. In July 2025, he signed a rookie contract with Somerset.

In November 2025, Rew was signed by the Paarl Royals to play in the SA20.

In May 2026, he agreed a contract extension with Somerset, tying him into the club until at least the end of the 2028 English county season. On 14 June 2026, Rew made his maiden first-class century, scoring 127 not out in Somerset's second innings of their County Championship match against Nottinghamshire at Trent Bridge.

== International career ==
On 30 June 2025 in a match against India Under-19s at the County Cricket Ground, Northampton, Rew set a new record for the fastest one-day century for England Under-19s, reaching his ton in 73 balls and going on to score 131 from 89 balls.

In November 2025, Rew played ahead of his brother James in England's Ashes warm-up game against the England Lions. A few days later he made his first-class debut when he played for England Lions against Australia A in Brisbane.

He was named in the England Lions squad for the 2026 50-overs series against South Africa A. In October 2026, he was included in the England T20 squad for their white ball tour of Australia.

== Personal life ==
He is the younger brother of cricketer James Rew, who made his debut for Somerset in 2021, when he also was 17.
