= 2026 Under-19 Men's Cricket World Cup =

Cricket Tournament

2026 ICC Under-19 Men's Cricket World Cup
- Dates: 15 January – 6 February 2026
- Administrator: International Cricket Council
- Cricket format: Limited-overs (50 overs)
- Tournament format(s): Group stage, Super 6s and Knockout stage
- Hosts: Zimbabwe; Namibia
- Champions: India (6th title)
- Runners-up: England
- Participants: 16
- Matches: 41
- Player of the series: (India) Vaibhav Sooryavanshi
- Most runs: (England) Ben Mayes (444)
- Most wickets: (England) Manny Lumsden (16)
- Official website: Official website

The 2026 ICC Under-19 Men's Cricket World Cup was an international limited-overs cricket tournament organised by the International Cricket Council (ICC), which was held in Zimbabwe and Namibia in early 2026. It was the sixteenth edition of the Under-19 Men's Cricket World Cup. Australia were the defending champions.

In the final, India defeated England by 100 runs to win their record sixth Under-19 Cricket World Cup title.

== Qualification ==
The top ten teams from the previous tournament qualified automatically, along with host Zimbabwe and the five winners of regional qualification tournaments.

The regional qualification tournaments were held from 25 February 2024 to 16 August 2025. The other five places in the tournament were awarded to the winners of the five regional under-19 tournaments.

List of teams qualified for the 2026 Under-19 Cricket World Cup
Method of qualification	Date of qualification	Venues	No. of teams	Teams
Full Member host (Note: Only full-member host nations secured automatic qualification for this Under-19 World Cup. Namibia despite co-hosting the tournament, had to play the qualifiers.)	13 November 2022	—N/a	1	Zimbabwe
2024 Under-19 Cricket World Cup (Top 10 teams from previous tournament)	3 February 2024	South Africa	10	Australia
2024 Under-19 Cricket World Cup (Top 10 teams from previous tournament)	3 February 2024	South Africa	10	Bangladesh
2024 Under-19 Cricket World Cup (Top 10 teams from previous tournament)	3 February 2024	South Africa	10	England
2024 Under-19 Cricket World Cup (Top 10 teams from previous tournament)	3 February 2024	South Africa	10	India
2024 Under-19 Cricket World Cup (Top 10 teams from previous tournament)	3 February 2024	South Africa	10	Ireland
2024 Under-19 Cricket World Cup (Top 10 teams from previous tournament)	3 February 2024	South Africa	10	Pakistan
2024 Under-19 Cricket World Cup (Top 10 teams from previous tournament)	3 February 2024	South Africa	10	New Zealand
2024 Under-19 Cricket World Cup (Top 10 teams from previous tournament)	3 February 2024	South Africa	10	Sri Lanka
2024 Under-19 Cricket World Cup (Top 10 teams from previous tournament)	3 February 2024	South Africa	10	South Africa
2024 Under-19 Cricket World Cup (Top 10 teams from previous tournament)	3 February 2024	South Africa	10	West Indies
Africa Qualifier	6 April 2025	Nigeria	1	Tanzania
Asia Qualifier	19 April 2025	Nepal	1	Afghanistan
East Asia-Pacific Qualifier	29 April 2025	Japan	1	Japan
Europe Qualifier	6 August 2025	Scotland	1	Scotland
Americas Qualifier	16 August 2025	United States	1	United States
Total			16	

== Match officials ==
On 8 January 2026, the ICC released the list of match referees and umpires for the tournament.

Match referees

- (India) Prakash Bhatt
- (England) Dean Cosker
- (Sri Lanka) Graeme Labrooy
- (Bangladesh) Neeyamur Rashid

Umpires

- (Pakistan) Faisal Afridi
- (Cricket West Indies) Zahid Bassarath
- (Netherlands) Nitin Bathi
- (New Zealand) Cory Black
- (Cricket West Indies) Deighton Butler
- (Zimbabwe) Iknow Chabi
- (Australia) Shawn Craig
- (Afghanistan) Ahmad Shah Durrani
- (South Africa) Lubabalo Gcuma
- (New Zealand) Shaun Haig
- (England) Graham Lloyd
- (Zimbabwe) Forster Mutizwa
- (Bangladesh) Masudur Rahman
- (Sri Lanka) Prageeth Rambukwella
- (Ireland) Aidan Seaver
- (India) Virender Sharma
- (England) Russell Warren

== Squads ==
Each team selected a squad of fifteen players for the tournament, excluding reserves, with Ireland being the first team to name their squad on 1 December 2025.

== Format ==
16 teams are divided into four groups. The top three teams from each group advance to the Super Six stage. The fourth placed teams in Group A and D face each other, while the fourth-placed teams in Group B and C face each other in the placement stage.

In the super-six stage, the top three teams from Group A and D are combined in one group, with the top three teams from Group B and C combined in another group. Each team carries forward the number of points, wins, and net run rate they have earned against other Super 6 qualifying teams and will then play two matches in the Super 6 stage against the opponent from the corresponding group that finished in a different group stage position (i.e. the A1 team plays only D2 and D3 in the Super 6). Similarly, A2 plays only D1 and D3, and so forth. So, all team will be evaluated in Super six with results from 4 matches played.

The top two teams from each group in the super-six stage will qualify for the semi-finals.

== Venues ==
In November 2025, the ICC unveiled the list of venues for the tournament, with Zimbabwe set to host 25 matches, including both semi-finals and the final, while Namibia set to host the remaining 16 fixtures.

Venues in Namibia
A map of Namibia with pin-points on 2026 Under-19 Cricket World Cup venues
Windhoek
Namibia Cricket Ground	High Performance Oval
Capacity: 7,000	—N/a
Matches: 8	Matches: 8

Venues in Zimbabwe
A map of Zimbabwe with pin-points on 2026 Under-19 Cricket World Cup venues
Bulawayo	Harare	
Queens Sports Club	Harare Sports Club	Takashinga Sports Club
Capacity: 12,500	Capacity: 10,000	Capacity: 10,000
Matches: 11 (Semi-final 1)	Matches: 7 (Semi-final 2 & Final)	Matches: 7

== Warm-up matches ==
The ICC announced the warm-up fixtures along with the complete tournament schedule on 19 November 2025.

Warm-up matches

9 January 2026
09:30
Scorecard

New Zealand; 264 (47.2 overs)	v	England; 266/5 (46 overs)
Tom Jones 50 (48); Alex Green 3/37 (6 overs)		Caleb Falconer 61 (57); Jaskaran Sandhu 2/34 (7 overs)

England won by 5 wickets
Prince Edward School, Harare
Umpires: Forster Mutizwa (Zim) and Masudur Rahman (Ban)
Player of the match: Ralphie Albert (Eng)

- England won the toss and elected to field.

10 January 2026
09:30
Scorecard

Bangladesh; 152/7 (36.3 overs)	v	Pakistan
Kalam Siddiki 71* (98); Ali Raza 3/34 (5.3 overs)

No result
Masvingo Sports Club, Masvingo
Umpires: Shawn Craig (Aus) and Aidan Seaver (Ire)

- Pakistan won the toss and elected to field.
- The match was reduced to 43 overs per side.
- Rain prevented any further play.

10 January 2026
09:30
Scorecard

India; 374/8 (50 overs)	v	Scotland; 112/9 (23.2 overs)
Vaibhav Sooryavanshi 96 (50); Ollie Jones 4/70 (10 overs)		Theo Robinson 30 (39); Khilan Patel 3/4 (4 overs)

India won by 121 runs (DLS method)
Bulawayo Athletic Club, Bulawayo
Umpires: Ahmed Shah Durrani (Afg) and Russell Warren (Eng)
Player of the match: Vaibhav Sooryavanshi (Ind)

- Scotland won the toss and elected to field.
- Rain prevented any further play.
- Scotland were set a revised target of 234 runs from 24 overs due to rain.

10 January 2026
09:30
Scorecard

United States; 174/4 (33.2 overs)	v	Zimbabwe
Amrinder Gill 100 (118); Dhruv Patel 2/15 (4 overs)

No result
Old Hararians, Harare
Umpires: Masudur Rahman (Ban) and Prageeth Rambukwella (SL)

- Zimbabwe won the toss and elected to field.
- Rain prevented any further play.

10 January 2026
09:30
Scorecard

West Indies; 246 (42.5 overs)	v	Ireland
Jewel Andrew 81 (107); Luke Murray 3/39 (7 overs)

No result
Wanderers Cricket Ground, Windhoek
Umpires: Faisal Afridi (Pak) and Nitin Bathi (Ned)

- West Indies won the toss and elected to bat.
- Rain prevented any further play.

10 January 2026
09:30
Scorecard

Tanzania; 204/9 (50 overs)	v	Japan; 45 (14.3 overs)
Laksh Bakrania 53* (97); Nihar Parmar 3/15 (5 overs)		Nikhil Pol 12 (18); Raymond Francis 3/7 (3 overs)

Tanzania won by 81 runs (DLS method)
United Ground, Windhoek
Umpires: Cory Black (NZ) and Deighton Butler (WI)
Player of the match: Laksh Bakrania (Tan)

- Japan won the toss and elected to field.
- Japan were set a revised target of 127 runs from 20 overs due to rain.

11 January 2026
09:30
Scorecard

Australia; 167 (43.5 overs)	v	Afghanistan; 164/4 (35.4 overs)
Alex Lee Young 57 (87); Abdul Aziz 3/30 (5.5 overs)		Osman Sadat 54 (87); Hayden Schiller 1/12 (5 overs)

Afghanistan won by 6 wickets (DLS method)
Wanderers Cricket Ground, Windhoek
Umpires: Graham Lloyd (Eng) and Virender Sharma (Ind)

- Australia won the toss and elected to bat
- Afghanistan were set a revised target of 164 runs from 48 overs due to rain.

11 January 2026
09:30
Scorecard

Sri Lanka; 225 (48.2 overs)	v	South Africa; 163 (33.3 overs)
Viran Chamuditha 87 (93); Daniel Bosman 3/35 (7 overs)		Muhammed Bulbulia 54 (48); Viran Chamuditha 2/31 (8 overs)

Sri Lanka won by 12 runs (DLS method)
United Ground, Windhoek
Umpires: Nitin Bathi (NL) and Iknow Chabi (Zim)
Player of the match: Viran Chamuditha (SL)

- Sri Lanka won the toss and elected to bat
- South Africa were set a revised target of 176 runs from 34 overs due to rain.

12 January 2026
09:30
Scorecard

New Zealand; 332 (46.5 overs)	v	Zimbabwe; 218 (40.3 overs)
Hugo Bogue 115 (75); Shelton Mazvitorera 3/56 (8.5 overs)		Brandon Senzere 66* (83); Harry Burns 3/46 (6 overs)

New Zealand won by 114 runs
Masvingo Sports Club, Masvingo
Umpires: Shawn Craig (Aus) and Lubabalo Gcuma (SA)

- Zimbabwe won the toss and elected to field.

12 January 2026
09:30
Scorecard

India; 295/8 (50 overs)	v	England; 196/3 (34.3 overs)
Abhigyan Kundu 82 (99); James Minto 5/34 (8 overs)		Thomas Rew 71* (66); Khilan Patel 2/38 (8.3 overs)

England won by 20 runs (DLS method)
Bulawayo Athletic Club, Bulawayo
Umpires: Zahid Bassarath (WI) and Russell Warren (Eng)

- India won the toss and elected to bat.
- Rain prevented any further play. DLS par score for England was set at 177 for 34.3 overs

13 January 2026
09:30
Scorecard

Pakistan; 294/8 (50 overs)	v	United States; 225 (43.5 overs)
Sameer Minhas 74 (55); Utkarsh Srivastava 3/26 (6 overs)		Sahil Garg 75 (83); Momin Qamar 2/24 (7 overs)

Pakistan won by 69 runs
Bulawayo Athletic Club, Bulawayo
Umpires: Zahid Bassarath (WI) and Ahmed Shah Durrani (Afg)

- United States won the toss and elected to field.

13 January 2026
09:30
Scorecard

Bangladesh; 161/4 (29.2 overs)	v	Scotland; 122/9 (19.3 overs)
Rifat Beg 75* (86); Shreyas Tekale 2/19 (5 overs)		Max Chaplin 31 (27); Samiun Basir 3/15 (3 overs)

No result
Prince Edward School, Harare
Umpires: Forster Mutizwa (Zim) and Prageeth Rambukwella (SL)

- Bangladesh won the toss and elected to bat.
- 1st innings was reduced to 29.2 overs due to rain.
- Scotland were set a revised target of 176 runs from 22 overs

13 January 2026
09:30
Scorecard

Ireland; 197 (46.1 overs)	v	Tanzania; 201/9 (44.2 overs)
Adam Leckey 38 (63); Khalidy Juma 5/35 (7.1 overs)		Simba Mbaki 49 (59); Oliver Riley 5/28 (9.2 overs)

Tanzania won by 1 wicket
Wanderers Cricket Ground, Windhoek
Umpires: Cory Black (NZ) and Iknow Chabi (Zim)

- Tanzania won the toss and elected to field.

13 January 2026
09:30
Scorecard

West Indies; 346/6 (50 overs)	v	Japan; 117 (42.3 overs)
Shamar Apple 124 (65); Kai Wall 2/36 (6 overs)		Taylor Waugh 32 (100); R'Jai Gitten 4/8 (4 overs)

West Indies won by 229 runs
United Ground, Windhoek
Umpires: Shaun Haig (NZ) and Virender Sharma (Ind)

- Japan won the toss and elected to field.

14 January 2026
09:30
Scorecard

Sri Lanka; 266/8 (50 overs)	v	Afghanistan; 110/3 (23.5 overs)
Kavija Gamage 97 (109); Khatir Stanikzai 3/36 (8 overs)		Khalid Ahmadzai 57* (74); Malintha Silva 1/11 (4.5 overs)

Sri Lanka won by 7 runs (DLS method)
Wanderers Cricket Ground, Windhoek
Umpires: Faisal Afridi (Pak) and Shaun Haig (NZ)

- Sri Lanka won the toss and elected to bat.
- Rain prevented any further play. DLS par score for Afghanistan was set at 118 for 23.5 overs

14 January 2026
09:30
Scorecard

South Africa; 255/9 (50 overs)	v	Australia; 122/2 (17 overs)
Jason Rowles 109 (110); Ben Gordon 2/22 (7 overs)		Will Malajczuk 85 (47); Bayanda Majola 1/25 (5 overs)

No result
United Ground, Windhoek
Umpires: Deighton Butler (WI) and Graham Lloyd (Eng)

- South Africa won the toss and elected to bat.
- Rain prevented any further play.

== Group stage ==
The ICC announced the groups and fixtures on 19 November 2025, with the group stage, comprising 24 matches, scheduled to be played from 15 to 24 January 2026.

=== Group A ===
==== Points table ====
Pos	Team	Pld	W	L	NR	Pts	NRR	Qualification
1	Australia	3	3	0	0	6	2.929	Advanced to the Super 6
2	Sri Lanka	3	2	1	0	4	1.113	Advanced to the Super 6
3	Ireland	3	1	2	0	2	−1.005	Advanced to the Super 6
4	Japan	3	0	3	0	0	−2.408	

Source: ESPNcricinfo

==== Fixtures ====
16 January 2026
09:30 UTC+2
Scorecard

Ireland; 235/7 (50 overs)	v	Australia; 237/2 (39.4 overs)
Rob O'Brien 79 (98); Charles Lachmund 3/41 (10 overs)		Steven Hogan 115 (111); Luke Murray 1/46 (8.4 overs)

Australia won by 8 wickets
Namibia Cricket Ground, Windhoek
Umpires: Deighton Butler (WI) and Forster Mutizwa (Zim)
Player of the match: Steven Hogan (Aus)

- Australia won the toss and elected to field.

17 January 2026
09:30 UTC+2
Scorecard

Sri Lanka; 387/4 (50 overs)	v	Japan; 184/8 (50 overs)
Viran Chamuditha 192 (143); Timothy Moore 3/43 (6 overs)		Hugo Tani-Kelly 101* (162); Sethmika Seneviratne 1/9 (3 overs)

Sri Lanka won by 203 runs
Namibia Cricket Ground, Windhoek
Umpires: Nitin Bathi (Ned) and Graham Lloyd (Eng)
Player of the match: Viran Chamuditha (SL)

- Japan won the toss and elected to field.
- Dimantha Mahavithana and Viran Chamuditha (SL) recorded the highest partnership for any wicket (328 runs) in a Youth ODI.
- Viran Chamuditha (SL) scored the highest individual score in U19 Men's Cricket World Cup.
- Hugo Tani-Kelly (Jap) scored his maiden century in Youth ODIs and became the first Japanese to score a century in U19 Men's Cricket World Cup.

19 January 2026
09:30 UTC+2
Scorecard

Sri Lanka; 267/5 (50 overs)	v	Ireland; 161 (40.1 overs)
Vimath Dinsara 95 (102); Oliver Riley 2/51 (10 overs)		Callum Armstrong 39 (83); Dulnith Sigera 4/19 (4.1 overs)

Sri Lanka won by 106 runs
Namibia Cricket Ground, Windhoek
Umpires: Deighton Butler (WI) and Shaun Haig (NZ)
Player of the match: Vimath Dinsara (SL)

- Sri Lanka won the toss and elected to bat.

20 January 2026
09:30 UTC+2
Scorecard

Japan; 201/8 (50 overs)	v	Australia; 204/2 (29.1 overs)
Hugo Tani-Kelly 79* (135); Naden Cooray 3/31 (10 overs)		Will Malajczuk 102 (55); Nihar Parmar 1/35 (8 overs)

Australia won by 8 wickets
Namibia Cricket Ground, Windhoek
Umpires: Forster Mutizwa (Zim) and Virender Sharma (Ind)
Player of the match: Will Malajczuk (Aus)

- Japan won the toss and elected to bat.
- This was the highest total scored by Japan in Youth ODIs.
- Will Malajczuk (Aus) scored the fastest century (51 balls) in the history of Under-19 Cricket World Cup.

22 January 2026
09:30 UTC+2
Scorecard

Japan; 247/9 (50 overs)	v	Ireland; 251/6 (48 overs)
Charlie Hara-Hinze 57 (70); Adam Leckey 3/44 (9 overs)		Freddie Ogilby 73 (46); Timothy Moore 2/30 (5 overs)

Ireland won by 4 wickets
Namibia Cricket Ground, Windhoek
Umpires: Faisal Afridi (Pak) and Forster Mutizwa (Zim)
Player of the match: Adam Leckey (Ire)

- Japan won the toss and elected to bat.

23 January 2026
09:30 UTC+2
Scorecard

Sri Lanka; 58 (18.5 overs)	v	Australia; 62/1 (12 overs)
Chamika Heentigala 14 (21); William Byrom 5/14 (6.5 overs)		Steven Hogan 28* (27); Rasith Nimsara 1/20 (3 overs)

Australia won by 9 wickets
Namibia Cricket Ground, Windhoek
Umpires: Deighton Butler (WI) and Virender Sharma (Ind)
Player of the match: William Byrom (Aus)

- Australia won the toss and elected to field.

=== Group B ===
==== Points table ====
Pos	Team	Pld	W	L	NR	Pts	NRR	Qualification
1	India	3	3	0	0	6	2.976	Advanced to the Super 6
2	Bangladesh	3	1	1	1	3	0.327	Advanced to the Super 6
3	New Zealand	3	0	1	2	2	−6.143	Advanced to the Super 6
4	United States	3	0	2	1	1	−1.720	

Source: ESPNcricinfo

==== Fixtures ====
15 January 2026
09:30 UTC+2
Scorecard

United States; 107 (35.2 overs)	v	India; 99/4 (17.2 overs)
Nitish Sundini 36 (52); Henil Patel 5/16 (7 overs)		Abhigyan Kundu 42* (41); Ritvik Appidi 2/24 (5 overs)

India won by 6 wickets (DLS method)
Queens Sports Club, Bulawayo
Umpires: Zahid Bassarath (WI) and Russell Warren (Eng)
Player of the match: Henil Patel (Ind)

- India won the toss and elected to field.
- India were set a revised target of 96 runs from 37 overs due to rain.

17 January 2026
09:30 UTC+2
Scorecard

India; 238 (48.4 overs)	v	Bangladesh; 146 (28.3 overs)
Abhigyan Kundu 80 (112); Al Fahad 5/38 (9.2 overs)		Azizul Hakim 51 (72); Vihaan Malhotra 4/14 (4 overs)

India won by 18 runs (DLS method)
Queens Sports Club, Bulawayo
Umpires: Lubabalo Gcuma (SA) and Russell Warren (Eng)
Player of the match: Vihaan Malhotra (Ind)

- Bangladesh won the toss and elected to field.
- The match was reduced to 49 overs per side due to rain.
- Bangladesh were set a revised target of 165 runs from 29 overs due to rain.

18 January 2026
09:30 UTC+2
Scorecard

United States; 253/9 (50 overs)	v	New Zealand; 12/0 (1 over)
Nitish Sudini 117* (133); Flynn Morey 4/40 (10 overs)		Hugo Bogue 10* (2)

No result
Queens Sports Club, Bulawayo
Umpires: Zahid Bassarath (WI) and Ahmed Shah Durrani (Afg)

- New Zealand won the toss and elected to field.
- Rain prevented any further play.

20 January 2026
09:30 UTC+2
Scorecard

New Zealand; 51/1 (10 overs)	v	Bangladesh
Aryan Mann 20* (36); Iqbal Hossain Emon 1/12 (3 overs)

No result
Queens Sports Club, Bulawayo
Umpires: Ahmed Shah Durrani (Afg) and Lubabalo Gcuma (SA)

- Bangladesh won the toss and elected to field.
- The match was reduced to 47 overs per side due to rain.
- Rain prevented any further play.

23 January 2026
09:30 UTC+2
Scorecard

United States; 199 (50 overs)	v	Bangladesh; 201/3 (41.3 overs)
Adnit Jhamb 68* (69); Iqbal Hossain Emon 3/41 (10 overs)		Azizul Hakim 64 (82); Ritvik Appidi 1/27 (7 overs)

Bangladesh won by 7 wickets
Takashinga Sports Club, Harare
Umpires: Lubabalo Gcuma (SA) and Zahid Bassarath (WI)
Player of the match: Iqbal Hossain Emon (Ban)

- Bangladesh won the toss and elected to field.

24 January 2026
09:30 UTC+2
Scorecard

New Zealand; 135 (36.2 overs)	v	India; 130/3 (13.3 overs)
Callum Samson 37* (48); RS Ambrish 4/29 (8 overs)		Ayush Mhatre 53 (27); Selwin Sanjay 1/22 (2.3 overs)

India won by 7 wickets (DLS method)
Queens Sports Club, Bulawayo
Umpires: Prageeth Rambukwella (SL) and Aidan Seaver (Ire)
Player of the match: RS Ambrish (Ind)

- India won the toss and elected to field.
- The match was reduced to 37 overs per side due to rain.
- India were set a revised target of 130 runs from 37 overs due to rain.

=== Group C ===
==== Points table ====
Pos	Team	Pld	W	L	NR	Pts	NRR	Qualification
1	England	3	3	0	0	6	2.870	Advanced to the Super 6
2	Pakistan	3	2	1	0	4	0.651	Advanced to the Super 6
3	Zimbabwe	3	0	2	1	1	−2.916	Advanced to the Super 6
4	Scotland	3	0	2	1	1	−2.986	

Source: ESPNcricinfo

==== Fixtures ====
15 January 2026
09:30 UTC+2
Scorecard

Zimbabwe	v	Scotland

Match abandoned
Takashinga Sports Club, Harare
Umpires: Masudur Rahman (Ban) and Aidan Seaver (Ire)

- No toss.
- No play was possible due to rain.

16 January 2026
09:30 UTC+2
Scorecard

England; 210 (46.5 overs)	v	Pakistan; 173 (46.3 overs)
Caleb Falconer 66 (73); Ahmed Hussain 3/38 (10 overs)		Farhan Yousaf 65 (86); Alex Green 2/21 (7 overs)

England won by 37 runs
Takashinga Sports Club, Harare
Umpires: Shawn Craig (Aus) and Prageeth Rambukwella (SL)
Player of the match: Caleb Falconer (Eng)

- Pakistan won the toss and elected to field.

18 January 2026
09:30 UTC+2
Scorecard

Zimbabwe; 208/9 (50 overs)	v	England; 209/2 (28 overs)
Simbarashe Mudzengerere 45* (63); Manny Lumsden 3/38 (10 overs)		Thomas Rew 86* (66); Shelton Mazvitorera 2/54 (6 overs)

England won by 8 wickets
Takashinga Sports Club, Harare
Umpires: Shawn Craig (Aus) and Prageeth Rambukwella (SL)
Player of the match: Thomas Rew (Eng)

- England won the toss and elected to field.

19 January 2026
09:30 UTC+2
Scorecard

Scotland; 187 (48.1 overs)	v	Pakistan; 190/4 (43.1 overs)
Thomas Knight 37 (72); Ali Raza 4/37 (10 overs)		Usman Khan 75 (85); Ollie Jones 2/41 (10 overs)

Pakistan won by 6 wickets
Takashinga Sports Club, Harare
Umpires: Masudur Rahman (Ban) and Aidan Seaver (Ire)
Player of the match: Usman Khan (Pak)

- Pakistan won the toss and elected to field.

21 January 2026
09:30 UTC+2
Scorecard

England; 404/6 (50 overs)	v	Scotland; 152 (44.5 overs)
Ben Mayes 191 (117); Jake Woodhouse 3/88 (10 overs)		Finlay Carter 34 (55); Caleb Falconer 3/19 (4.5 overs)

England won by 252 runs
Takashinga Sports Club, Harare
Umpires: Shawn Craig (Aus) and Masudur Rahman (Ban)
Player of the match: Ben Mayes (Eng)

- Scotland won the toss and elected to field.

22 January 2026
09:30 UTC+2
Scorecard

Zimbabwe; 128 (35.5 overs)	v	Pakistan; 132/2 (26.2 overs)
Nathaniel Hlabangana 59 (85); Ali Raza 3/16 (8 overs)		Sameer Minhas 74* (75); Panashe Mazai 1/36 (10 overs)

Pakistan won by 8 wickets
Takashinga Sports Club, Harare
Umpires: Ahmed Shah Durrani (Afg) and Russell Warren (Eng)
Player of the match: Sameer Minhas (Pak)

- Pakistan won the toss and elected to field.

=== Group D ===
==== Points table ====
Pos	Team	Pld	W	L	NR	Pts	NRR	Qualification
1	Afghanistan	3	3	0	0	6	2.487	Advanced to the Super 6
2	West Indies	3	2	1	0	4	0.230	Advanced to the Super 6
3	South Africa	3	1	2	0	2	1.640	Advanced to the Super 6
4	Tanzania	3	0	3	0	0	−5.446	

Source: ESPNcricinfo

==== Fixtures ====
15 January 2026
09:30 UTC+2
Scorecard

Tanzania; 122 (34 overs)	v	West Indies; 124/5 (21 overs)
Dylan Thakrar 26 (38); Vitel Lawes 3/23 (6 overs)		Tanez Francis 52 (55); Augustino Mwamele 2/17 (3 overs)

West Indies won by 5 wickets
High Performance Oval, Windhoek
Umpires: Cory Black (NZ) and Iknow Chabi (Zim)
Player of the match: Shaquan Belle (WI)

- West Indies won the toss and elected to field.

16 January 2026
09:30 UTC+2
Scorecard

Afghanistan; 266/8 (50 overs)	v	South Africa; 238 (47.4 overs)
Faisal Shinozada 82 (96); Corne Botha 3/45 (10 overs)		Jason Rowles 98 (93); Khatir Stanikzai 2/46 (8.5 overs)

Afghanistan won by 28 runs
High Performance Oval, Windhoek
Umpires: Faisal Afridi (Pak) and Shaun Haig (NZ)
Player of the match: Uzairullah Niazai (Afg)

- South Africa won the toss and elected to field.

18 January 2026
09:30 UTC+2
Scorecard

Afghanistan; 262/6 (50 overs)	v	West Indies; 124 (33.2 overs)
Osman Sadat 88 (131); Jakeem Pollard 3/39 (10 overs)		Jewel Andrew 57 (70); Nooristani Omarzai 4/16 (7.2 overs)

Afghanistan won by 138 runs
High Performance Oval, Windhoek
Umpires: Faisal Afridi (Pak) and Shaun Haig (NZ)
Player of the match: Mahboob Khan (Afg)

- Afghanistan won the toss and elected to bat.

19 January 2026
09:30 UTC+2
Scorecard

South Africa; 397/5 (50 overs)	v	Tanzania; 68 (32.2 overs)
Jason Rowles 125* (101); Simba Mbaki 2/85 (7 overs)		Simba Mbaki 17 (26); Bayanda Majola 2/6 (6.2 overs)

South Africa won by 329 runs
High Performance Oval, Windhoek
Umpires: Nitin Bathi (Ned) and Graham Lloyd (Eng)
Player of the match: Jason Rowles (SA)

- Tanzania won the toss and elected to field.

21 January 2026
09:30 UTC+2
Scorecard

Tanzania; 85 (36 overs)	v	Afghanistan; 88/1 (12.4 overs)
Augustino Mwamele 14 (49); Nooristani Omarzai 5/9 (7 overs)		Faisal Shinozada 55* (34); Khalidy Juma 1/32 (6 overs)

Afghanistan won by 9 wickets
High Performance Oval, Windhoek
Umpires: Iknow Chabi (Zim) and Virender Sharma (Ind)
Player of the match: Nooristani Omarzai (Afg)

- Tanzania won the toss and elected to bat.

22 January 2026
09:30 UTC+2
Scorecard

West Indies; 234 (47.5 overs)	v	South Africa; 179 (37.4 overs)
Zachary Carter 114 (104); JJ Basson 5/23 (10 overs)		Jason Rowles 46 (40); Shaquan Belle 6/40 (10 overs)

West Indies won by 55 runs
High Performance Oval, Windhoek
Umpires: Shaun Haig (NZ) and Graham Lloyd (Eng)
Player of the match: Zachary Carter (WI)

- West Indies won the toss and elected to bat.

== 13th to 16th Place play-offs ==
24 January 2026
09:30 UTC+2
Scorecard

Tanzania; 131 (38.3 overs)	v	Japan; 136/1 (28.2 overs)
Acrey Hugo 55 (77); Nihar Parmar 4/30 (10 overs)		Nihar Parmar 53* (74)

Japan won by 9 wickets
High Performance Oval, Windhoek
Umpires: Cory Black (NZ) and Forster Mutizwa (Zim)
Player of the match: Nihar Parmar (Jap)

- Tanzania won the toss and elected to bat.
- This was Japan's first victory in the history of Under-19 Cricket World Cup.

26 January 2026
09:30 UTC+2
Scorecard

Scotland; 236 (50 overs)	v	United States; 239/3 (38.4 overs)
Theo Robinson 83 (101); Ritvik Appidi 4/54 (10 overs)		Adnit Jhamb 116* (93); Ollie Jones 2/46 (9.4 overs)

United States won by 7 wickets
Harare Sports Club, Harare
Umpires: Zahid Bassarath (WI) and Ahmed Shah Durrani (Afg)
Player of the match: Adnit Jhamb (USA)

- Scotland won the toss and elected to bat.

== Super 6 ==
Teams will face each other in diagonal form in Super 6, which means A1 will face D2 and D3, A2 will face D1 and D3, and A3 will face D1 and D2.

=== Group 1 ===
==== Points table ====
Pos	Team	Pld	W	L	NR	Pts	NRR	Qualification
1	Australia	4	4	0	0	8	1.950	Advanced to the Semi-finals
2	Afghanistan	4	3	1	0	6	1.725	Advanced to the Semi-finals
3	Sri Lanka	4	3	1	0	6	−0.113	
4	West Indies	4	2	2	0	4	−0.421	
5	South Africa	4	0	4	0	0	−0.980	
6	Ireland	4	0	4	0	0	−2.010	

Source: ESPNcricinfo

Fixtures

25 January 2026
09:30 UTC+2
Scorecard

South Africa; 118 (32.1 overs)	v	Australia; 122/4 (32.5 overs)
Paul James 34 (60); Charles Lachmund 3/29 (7 overs)		Steven Hogan 43 (73); JJ Basson 3/41 (10 overs)

Australia won by 6 wickets
Namibia Cricket Ground, Windhoek
Umpires: Faisal Afridi (Pak) and Nitin Bathi (Ned)
Player of the match: Charles Lachmund (Aus)

- Australia won the toss and elected to field.

25 January 2026
09:30 UTC+2
Scorecard

West Indies; 226 (46.5 overs)	v	Ireland; 164/7 (40 overs)
Jewel Andrew 66 (82); Reuben Wilson 3/50 (8.5 overs)		James West 45 (55); Micah McKenzie 4/36 (10 overs)

West Indies won by 25 runs (DLS method)
High Performance Oval, Windhoek
Umpires: Iknow Chabi (Zim) and Shaun Haig (NZ)
Player of the match: Micah McKenzie (WI)

- West Indies won the toss and elected to bat.
- Ireland's innings curtailed at 40 overs due to rain; DLS par score was 190.

26 January 2026
09:30 UTC+2
Scorecard

Afghanistan; 193 (49.5 overs)	v	Sri Lanka; 194/6 (46.5 overs)
Osman Sadat 61 (107); Viran Chamuditha 2/20 (10 overs)		Senuja Wekunagoda 43 (79); Rohullah Arab 2/23 (10 overs)

Sri Lanka won by 4 wickets
Namibia Cricket Ground, Windhoek
Umpires: Cory Black (NZ) and Forster Mutizwa (Zim)
Player of the match: Chamika Heenatigala (SL)

- Sri Lanka won the toss and elected to field.

28 January 2026
09:30 UTC+2
Scorecard

Australia; 314/7 (50 overs)	v	West Indies; 292/9 (50 overs)
Oliver Peake 109 (117); Jakeem Pollard 2/37 (8 overs)		Zachary Carter 64 (42); Charles Lachmund 4/66 (9 overs)

Australia won by 22 runs
Harare Sports Club, Harare
Umpires: Nitin Bathi (Ned) and Graham Lloyd (Eng)
Player of the match: Oliver Peake (Aus)

- West Indies won the toss and elected to field.

29 January 2026
09:30 UTC+2
Scorecard

South Africa; 261/7 (50 overs)	v	Sri Lanka; 265/5 (46 overs)
Jorich Van Schalkwyk 116 (130); Vigneshwaran Akash 4/46 (10 overs)		Viran Chamuditha 110 (94); Corne Botha 2/37 (8 overs)

Sri Lanka won by 5 wickets
Queens Sports Club, Bulawayo
Umpires: Cory Black (NZ) and Shawn Craig (Aus)
Player of the match: Viran Chamuditha (SL)

- South Africa won the toss and elected to bat.

30 January 2026
09:30 UTC+2
Scorecard

Afghanistan; 315/7 (50 overs)	v	Ireland; 124 (40.4 overs)
Faisal Shinozada 163 (142); Reuben Wilson 3/52 (10 overs)		Marko Bates 34 (81); Abdul Aziz 3/21 (7.4 overs)

Afghanistan won by 191 runs
Harare Sports Club, Harare
Umpires: Graham Lloyd (Eng) and Prageeth Rambukwella (SL)
Player of the match: Faisal Shinozada (Eng)

- Afghanistan won the toss and elected to bat.

=== Group 2 ===
==== Points table ====
Pos	Team	Pld	W	L	NR	Pts	NRR	Qualification
1	India	4	4	0	0	8	2.585	Advanced to the Semi-finals
2	England	4	4	0	0	8	1.757	Advanced to the Semi-finals
3	Pakistan	4	2	2	0	4	0.765	
4	Bangladesh	4	1	2	1	3	−0.505	
5	New Zealand	4	0	3	1	1	−2.923	
6	Zimbabwe	4	0	4	0	0	−2.815	

Source: ESPNcricinfo

==== Fixtures ====
26 January 2026
09:30 UTC+2
Scorecard

Bangladesh; 136 (38.1 overs)	v	England; 137/3 (24.1 overs)
Rifat Beg 31 (36); Sebastian Morgan 3/28 (7 overs)		Thomas Rew 59* (50); Al Fahad 2/37 (7 overs)

England won by 7 wickets
Queens Sports Club, Bulawayo
Umpires: Shawn Craig (Aus) and Lubabalo Gcuma (SA)
Player of the match: Thomas Rew (Eng)

- Bangladesh won the toss and elected to bat.

27 January 2026
09:30 UTC+2
Scorecard

New Zealand; 110 (28.3 overs)	v	Pakistan; 112/2 (17.2 overs)
Hugo Bogue 39 (27); Abdul Subhan 4/11 (6.3 overs)		Sameer Minhas 76* (59); Mason Clarke 1/34 (6 overs)

Pakistan won by 8 wickets
Harare Sports Club, Harare
Umpires: Masudur Rahman (Ban) and Russell Warren (Eng)
Player of the match: Abdul Subhan (Pak)

- Pakistan won the toss and elected to field.

27 January 2026
09:30 UTC+2
Scorecard

India; 352/8 (50 overs)	v	Zimbabwe; 148 (37.4 overs)
Vihaan Malhotra 109* (107); Tatenda Chimugoro 3/49 (8 overs)		Leeroy Chiwaula 62 (77); Ayush Mhatre 3/14 (4 overs)

India won by 204 runs
Queens Sports Club, Bulawayo
Umpires: Prageeth Rambukwella (SL) and Aidan Seaver (Ire)
Player of the match: Vihaan Malhotra (Ind)

- Zimbabwe won the toss and elected to field.

30 January 2026
09:30 UTC+2
Scorecard

England; 234/7 (50 overs)	v	New Zealand; 169 (38.5 overs)
Ben Mayes 53 (70); Snehith Reddy 2/28 (6 overs)		Snehith Reddy 47 (65); Manny Lumsden 5/17 (6.5 overs)

England won by 65 runs
Queens Sports Club, Bulawayo
Umpires: Zahid Bassarath (WI) and Iknow Chabi (Zim)
Player of the match: Manny Lumsden (Eng)

- New Zealand won the toss and elected to field.

31 January 2026
09:30 UTC+2
Scorecard

Bangladesh; 253/9 (50 overs)	v	Zimbabwe; 179 (48.4 overs)
Azizul Hakim 59 (87); Michael Blignaut 2/41 (10 overs)		Simbarashe Mudzengerere 70 (121); Iqbal Hossain Emon 5/24 (10 overs)

Bangladesh won by 74 runs
Harare Sports Club, Harare
Umpires: Faisal Afridi (Pak) and Virender Sharma (Ind)
Player of the match: Iqbal Hossain Emon (Ban)

- Bangladesh won the toss and elected to bat.

1 February 2026
09:30 UTC+2
Scorecard

India; 252 (49.5 overs)	v	Pakistan; 194 (46.2 overs)
Vedant Trivedi 68 (98); Abdul Subhan 3/33 (9.5 overs)		Usman Khan 66 (92); Ayush Mhatre 3/21 (8 overs)

India won by 58 runs
Queens Sports Club, Bulawayo
Umpires: Deighton Butler (WI) and Lubabalo Gcuma (SA)
Player of the match: Kanishk Chouhan (Ind)

- Pakistan won the toss and elected to field.

== Knockout stage ==
=== Bracket ===
Semi-final
A1	Australia	250 (47.3 overs)
B2	England	277/7 (50 overs)
B1	India	311/3 (41.1 overs)
A2	Afghanistan	310/4 (50 overs)

Final
SFW1	England	311 (40.2 overs)
SFW2	India	411/9 (50 overs)

=== Semi-finals ===
Semi-final 1
3 February 2026
09:30 UTC+2
Scorecard

England; 277/7 (50 overs)	v	Australia; 250 (47.3 overs)
Thomas Rew 110 (107); Hayden Schiller 3/31 (8 overs)		Oliver Peake 100 (88); James Minto 2/30 (6.3 overs)

England won by 27 runs
Queens Sports Club, Bulawayo
Umpires: Zahid Bassarath (WI) and Virender Sharma (Ind)
Player of the match: Thomas Rew (Eng)

- England won the toss and elected to bat.

Semi-final 2
4 February 2026
09:30 UTC+2
Scorecard

Afghanistan; 310/4 (50 overs)	v	India; 311/3 (41.1 overs)
Faisal Shinozada 110 (93); Kanishk Chouhan 2/55 (9 overs)		Aaron George 115 (104); Nooristani Omarzai 2/64 (10 overs)

India won by 7 wickets
Harare Sports Club, Harare
Umpires: Shaun Haig (NZ) and Russell Warren (Eng)
Player of the match: Aaron George (Ind)

- Afghanistan won the toss and elected to bat.
- India qualified for 10th final in U19 World Cup history.

=== Final ===
Final
6 February 2026
09:30 UTC+2
Scorecard

India; 411/9 (50 overs)	v	England; 311 (40.2 overs)
Vaibhav Sooryavanshi 175 (80); James Minto 3/63 (8 overs)		Caleb Falconer 115 (67); RS Ambrish 3/56 (9 overs)

India won by 100 runs
Harare Sports Club, Harare
Umpires: Lubabalo Gcuma (SA) and Shaun Haig (NZ)
Player of the match: Vaibhav Sooryavanshi (Ind)

- India won the toss and elected to bat.
- Vaibhav Sooryavanshi (Ind) holds the tournament record for the highest number of sixes hit by a batter in the history of the Under-19 Cricket World Cup, with a total of 30.
- Vaibhav Sooryavanshi's (Ind) 55-ball century is the second fastest in Under-19 World Cup history.
- Vaibhav Sooryavanshi (Ind) recorded the most sixes (15) in a Youth ODI innings.

== Final standings ==
Pos.	Team
1	India
2	England
3	Australia
4	Afghanistan
5	Sri Lanka
6	Pakistan
7	West Indies
8	Bangladesh
9	New Zealand
10	South Africa
11	Ireland
12	Zimbabwe
13	United States
14	Japan
15	Scotland
16	Tanzania

== Team of the tournament ==
On 8 February 2026, the ICC announced the team of the tournament.

- (India) Vaibhav Sooryavanshi
- (Sri Lanka) Viran Chamuditha
- (Afghanistan) Faisal Shinozada
- (England) Thomas Rew (c, wk)
- (Australia) Oliver Peake
- (England) Ben Mayes
- (India) Kanishk Chouhan
- (Afghanistan) Nooristani Omarzai
- (Cricket West Indies) Vitel Lawes
- (Pakistan) Ali Raza
- (England) Manny Lumsden
- (India) Henil Patel (12th man)

== Records ==
Batting Records
Record	Value	Player	Team	Against
Most Runs	444	Ben Mayes	England	
Highest Innings	192	Viran Chamuditha	Sri Lanka	Japan
Highest Average	200	Hugo Tani-Kelly	Japan	
Highest Strike Rate	169.49	Vaibhav Sooryavanshi	India	
Most Centuries	2	Oliver Peake	Australia	
Most Centuries	2	Viran Chamuditha	Sri Lanka	
Most Centuries	2	Faisal Shinozada	Afghanistan	
Most Sixes	30	Vaibhav Sooryavanshi	India	
Most Sixes in an innings	15	Vaibhav Sooryavanshi	India	England
Highest Partnership	328	Dimantha Mahavithana	Sri Lanka	Japan
Highest Partnership	328	Viran Chamuditha	Sri Lanka	Japan

Bowling Records
Record	Value	Player	Team	Against
Most Wickets	16	Manny Lumsden	England	
Best Bowling Figures	6/40	Shaquan Belle	West Indies	South Africa
Best Average (min. 10 overs)	9.07	Abdul Subhan	Pakistan	
Best Economy Rate (min. 10 overs)	2.65	Viran Chamuditha	Sri Lanka	
Best Strike Rate (min. 10 overs)	13.2	Timothy Moore	Japan	
Most 4+ Wicket Hauls	2	Nooristani Omarzai	Afghanistan	

Team Records
Record	Value	Team	Against
Highest Innings Total	411/9	India	England
Highest Match Aggregate	722	India	England
Highest Victory Margin (Runs)	329	South Africa	Tanzania
Highest Victory Margin (Wickets)	9	Afghanistan	Tanzania
Highest Victory Margin (Wickets)	9	Australia	Sri Lanka
Highest Victory Margin (Wickets)	9	Japan	Tanzania
Most Extras Conceded in an Innings	35	Afghanistan	South Africa

Fielding Records
Record	Value	Player	Team
Most Catches	8	Ben Dawkins	England
Most Wicketkeeper Dismissals	14	Hamza Zahoor	Afghanistan
Most Wicketkeeper Dismissals	14	Thomas Rew	England
