= 1989 Asia Youth Cup =

Cricket tournament

- Dates: 8 December 1989 – 15 December 1989
- Administrator: Asian Cricket Council (ACC)
- Cricket format: 50-over
- Tournament format(s): Round-robin, Final
- Host: Bangladesh
- Champions: India (1st title)
- Runners-up: Sri Lanka
- Participants: 3
- Matches: 4

The 1989 Asia Youth Cup (Also known as Beximco Asia Youth Cup for sponsorship reasons) was the 1st edition of ACC Under-19 Cup. 3 teams played in that tournament, India became the champions of this edition.

== Group stage ==
=== Points table ===
Pos	Team	Pld	W	L	T	NR	Pts	NRR	Qualification
1	India	2	2	0	0	0	8	0.138	Advanced to Final
2	Sri Lanka	2	1	1	0	0	4	0.545	Advanced to Final
3	Pakistan	2	0	2	0	0	0	−0.709	

Source: Cricinfo

=== Matches ===
8 December 1989
Scorecard

Pakistan; 176 (47.5 overs)	v	India; 179/6 (46.2 overs)

India U19 won by 4 wickets
Bangabandhu National Stadium, Dhaka
Player of the match: Jatin Paranjpe (IND)

- India U19 won the toss and elected to field.

10 December 1989
Scorecard

Sri Lanka; 211/5 (45 overs)	v	Pakistan; 116 (34.1 overs)

Sri Lanka U19 won by 95 runs
Rajshahi Stadium, Rajshahi
Player of the match: Ananda Bandaranayake (SL)

- India U19 won the toss and elected to field.

14 December 1989
Scorecard

India; 189/9 (49 overs)	v	Sri Lanka; 159 (42.5 overs)

India U19 won by 30 runs
Bangabandhu National Stadium, Dhaka

- NO TOSS.

== Final ==
15 December 1989
Scorecard

India; 224/7 (49 overs)	v	Sri Lanka; 145 (39.5 overs)
Vinod Kambli 46; Piyal Wijetunge 1/32 (10 overs)		Jehan Jaymon 42; Gyanendra Pandey 3/43 (10 overs)

India U19 won by 79 runs
Bangabandhu National Stadium, Dhaka

- India U19 won the toss and elected to bat.
- India U19 won the Asia Youth Cup for the first time.
