= 2024 ACC Under-19 Asia Cup =

Cricket tournament

- Dates: 29 November – 8 December 2024
- Administrator: Asian Cricket Council
- Cricket format: Limited overs cricket
- Tournament format(s): Group stage and final
- Host: United Arab Emirates
- Champions: Bangladesh (2nd title)
- Runners-up: India
- Participants: 8
- Matches: 15
- Player of the series: (Bangladesh) Iqbal Hossain Emon
- Most runs: (Pakistan) Shahzaib Khan (336)
- Most wickets: (Bangladesh) Iqbal Hossain Emon (13)

The 2024 ACC Under-19 Asia Cup was the eleventh edition of the ACC Under-19 Asia Cup, a limited overs cricket tournament featuring eight Under-19 teams. It was played from 29 November to 8 December 2024. The five full members of the Asian Cricket Council took part in the tournament: Afghanistan, Bangladesh, India, Pakistan, and Sri Lanka, along with the top three ranked teams from the qualifiers round, Japan, Nepal and UAE.

Bangladesh were the defending champions, having won their maiden title in 2023, beating the United Arab Emirates in the final by 195 runs.

Bangladesh won their second consecutive title beating the India in the final by 59 runs.

== Teams and qualifications ==
Means of qualification	Date	Host	Berths	Qualified
ICC Full Member	—N/a	—N/a	5	Afghanistan
ICC Full Member	—N/a	—N/a	5	Bangladesh
ICC Full Member	—N/a	—N/a	5	India
ICC Full Member	—N/a	—N/a	5	Pakistan
ICC Full Member	—N/a	—N/a	5	Sri Lanka
2023 ACC Men's Under-19 Premier Cup	24 October 2023	Malaysia	3	Japan
2023 ACC Men's Under-19 Premier Cup	24 October 2023	Malaysia	3	Nepal
2023 ACC Men's Under-19 Premier Cup	24 October 2023	Malaysia	3	United Arab Emirates
Total			8	

== Squads ==
Afghanistan	Bangladesh	India	Japan	Nepal	Pakistan	Sri Lanka	United Arab Emirates
Mehboob Taskin (c, wk); Hamza Alikhil (wk); Uzair Khan; Faisal Khan; Barakatullah Ibrahimzai; Ezatullah Barikzai; Aziz Miakhil; Nazeef Amiri; Abdul Aziz; Nasratullah Nooristani; Khatir Stanikzai; Fahim Khewawal; Hafeez Zadran; Allah Mohammad Ghazanfar; Naseer Khan Maroofkhil	Azizul Hakim Tamim (c); Zawad Abrar (vc); Ashrafuzzaman Barenaya; Rifat Beg; Iqbal Hossain Emon; Mohammad Al Fahad; Farid Hasan; Rizan Hossan; Saad Islam; Shihab James; Maruf Mridha; Samiun Basir Ratul; Islam Razin; Debashish Sarker; Rafi Uzzaman	Mohd. Amaan (c); Kiran Chormale (vc); Ayush Mhatre; Vaibhav Sooryavanshi; C Andre Siddarth; Pranav Pant; Harvansh Singh Pangalia (wk); Anurag Kawde (wk); Hardik Raj; Md. Enaan; KP Karthikeya; Samarth Nagaraj; Yudhajit Guha; Chetan Sharma; Nikhil Kumar	Koji Hardgrave-Abe (c); Charles Hara-Hinze; Kazuma Kato-Stafford; Hugo Kelly; Timothy Moore; Skyler Nakayama-Cook; Daniel Panckhurst; Nihar Parmar; Aditya Phadke; Aarav Tiwari; Kai Wall; Yuto Yageta; Kiefer Yamamoto-Lake; Max Yonekawa-Lynn	Hemant Dhami (c); Arjun Kumal (vc); Aakash Tripathi; Uttam Rangu Thapa Magar (wk); Mayan Yadav; Naren Saud; Unish Bikram Singh Thakuri; Naren Bhatta; Santosh Yadav; Yuvraj Khatri; Roshan Bishwakarma; Bipin Kumar Mahato; Aprajit Poudel; Abhisekh Tiwari; Ranjit Kumar	Saad Baig (c, wk); Mohammad Ahmed; Haroon Arshad; Tayyab Arif; Mohammad Huzefa; Naveed Ahmed Khan; Hassan Khan; Shahzaib Khan; Usman Khan; Faham-ul-Haq; Ali Raza; Mohammad Riazullah; Abdul Subhan; Farhan Yousuf; Umar Zaib	Vihas Thevmika (c); Lakvin Abeysinghe; Viran Chamuditha; Vimath Dinsara; Yenula Dewthusa; Geethika De Silva; Kavija Gamage; Mathulan Kugathas; Praveen Maneesha; Newton Ranjithkumar; Pulindu Perera; Ramiru Perera; Tanuja Rajapakse; Dulnith Sigera; Sharujan Shanmuganathan (wk)	Aayan Afzal Khan (c); Mudit Agarwal; Noorullah Ayobi; Harsh Desai; Karan Dhiman; Ethan D'Souza; Rachit Ghosh; Rayan Khan; Akshat Rai; Yayin Rai; Faisur Rahman; Aryan Saxena; Aliasgar Shums; Uddish Suri; Abdullah Tarique

Pakistan also named Ahmed Hussain, Mohammad Huzaifa, Rizwanullah, and Yahya bin Abdul Rehman as their non-travelling reserves. Bangladesh also named Kalam Siddiki Aleen as a travelling reserve and Shahriar Ajmir, Yeasir Arafat, Sanjid Mojumder as their non-travelling reserves.

== Group stage ==
The ACC released the fixture details on 8 November 2024.

=== Group A ===
==== Points table ====
Pos	Team	Pld	W	L	T	NR	Pts	NRR	Qualification
1	Pakistan	3	3	0	0	0	6	1.947	Knockout stage
2	India	3	2	1	0	0	4	2.558	Knockout stage
3	United Arab Emirates (H)	3	1	2	0	0	2	0.332	
4	Japan	3	0	3	0	0	0	−4.427	

Source: ESPNcricinfo
(H) Host

==== Fixture ====
30 November 2024
09:00
Scorecard

Pakistan; 281/7 (50 overs)	v	India; 238 (47.1 overs)
Shahzaib Khan 159 (147); Samarth Nagaraj 3/45 (10 overs)		Nikhil Kumar 67 (77); Ali Raza 3/36 (9 overs)

Pakistan won by 43 runs
Dubai International Cricket Stadium, Dubai
Umpires: Tanvir Ahmed (Ban) and Ravindra Kottahachchi (SL)
Player of the match: Shahzaib Khan (Pak)

- Pakistan won the toss and elected to bat.

30 November 2024
09:00
Scorecard

United Arab Emirates; 325/7 (50 overs)	v	Japan; 52 (24.1 overs)
Aryan Saxena 150 (120); Kiefer Yamamoto-Lake 4/42 (9 overs)		Nihar Parmar 23 (39); Uddish Suri 4/2 (5.1 overs)

United Arab Emirates won by 273 runs
Sharjah Cricket Stadium, Sharjah
Umpires: Farooq Khan (Afg) and Sarika Prasad (Sin)
Player of the match: Aryan Saxena (UAE)

- United Arab Emirates won the toss and elected to bat.

2 December 2024
09:00
Scorecard

Pakistan; 314/3 (50 overs)	v	United Arab Emirates; 245/8 (50 overs)
Shahzaib Khan 132 (136); Noorullah Ayobi 2/68 (7 overs)		Ethan D'Souza 84 (102); Abdul Subhan 6/57 (10 overs)

Pakistan won by 69 runs
Dubai International Cricket Stadium, Dubai
Umpires: Sanjay Gurung (Nep) and Farooq Khan (Afg)
Player of the match: Mohamed Amaan (Ind)

- United Arab Emirates won the toss and elected to field.

2 December 2024
09:00
Scorecard

India; 339/6 (50 overs)	v	Japan; 128/8 (50 overs)
Mohamed Amaan 122* (118); Kiefer Yamamoto-Lake 2/84 (10 overs)		Hugo Kelly 50 (111); Hardik Raj 2/9 (8 overs)

India won by 211 runs
Sharjah Cricket Stadium, Sharjah
Umpires: Ravindra Kottahachchi (SL) and Sarika Prasad (Sin)
Player of the match: Mohamed Amaan (Ind)

- Japan won the toss and elected to field.

4 December 2024
09:00
Scorecard

Pakistan; 243/6 (50 overs)	v	Japan; 63 (28.3 overs)
Muhammad Riazullah 66 (78); Nihar Parmar 2/18 (6 overs)		Nihar Parmar 25 (60); Mohammad Huzaifa 5/8 (6.3 overs)

Pakistan Under-19 won by 180 runs
Dubai International Cricket Stadium, Dubai
Umpires: Tanvir Ahmed (Ban) and Sarika Prasad (Sin)
Player of the match: Mohammad Huzaifa (Pak)

- Pakistan won the toss and elected to bat.

4 December 2024
09:00
Scorecard

United Arab Emirates; 137 (44 overs)	v	India; 143/0 (16.1 overs)
Muhammad Rayan 35 (48 overs); Yudhajit Guha 3/15 (7 overs)		Vaibhav Sooryavanshi 76* (46)

India won by 10 wickets
Sharjah Cricket Stadium, Sharjah
Umpires: Sanjay Gurung (Nep) and Farooq Khan (Afg)
Player of the match: Ayush Mhatre (Ind)

- United Arab Emirates won the toss and elected to bat.

=== Group B ===
==== Points table ====
Pos	Team	Pld	W	L	T	NR	Pts	NRR	Qualification
1	Sri Lanka	3	3	0	0	0	6	1.287	Knockout stage
2	Bangladesh	3	2	1	0	0	4	0.913	Knockout stage
3	Nepal	3	1	2	0	0	2	−0.740	
4	Afghanistan	3	0	3	0	0	0	−1.418	

Source: ESPNcricinfo

==== Fixtures ====
29 November 2024
09:00
Scorecard

Bangladesh; 228/9 (50 overs)	v	Afghanistan; 183 (47.5 overs)
Azizul Hakim Tamim 103 (133); Abdul Aziz 2/29 (9 overs)		Faisal Khan Ahmadzai 58 (58); Iqbal Hossain Emon 3/36 (9.5 overs)

Bangladesh won by 45 runs
Dubai International Cricket Stadium, Dubai
Umpires: Sanjay Gurung (Nep) and Rohan Pandit (Ind)
Player of the match: Azizul Hakim (Ban)

- Afghanistan won the toss and elected to field.
- Azizul Hakim (Ban) scored his maiden century in YODIs.

29 November 2024
09:00
Scorecard

Sri Lanka; 233 (50 overs)	v	Nepal; 178 (46.2 overs)
Sharujan Shanmuganathan 62 (99); Santosh Yadav 4/45 (10 overs)		Mayan Yadav 62 (91); Praveen Maneesha 3/30 (9 overs)

Sri Lanka won by 55 runs
Sharjah Cricket Stadium, Sharjah
Umpires: Faisal Afridi (Pak) and Akbar Ali (UAE)
Player of the match: Sharujan Shanmuganathan (SL)

- Nepal won the toss and elected to field.

1 December 2024
09:00
Scorecard

Nepal; 141 (45.4 overs)	v	Bangladesh; 142/5 (28.4 overs)
Aakash Tripathi 43 (77); Rizan Hossan 2/8 (6 overs)		Zawad Abrar 59 (65); Yuvraj Khatri 4/23 (6 overs)

Bangladesh won by 5 wickets
Dubai International Cricket Stadium, Dubai
Umpires: Faisal Afridi (Pak) and Akbar Ali (UAE)
Player of the match: Zawad Abrar (Ban)

- Bangladesh won the toss and elected to field.

1 December 2024
09:00
Scorecard

Sri Lanka; 243/7 (50 overs)	v	Afghanistan; 112 (28.2 overs)
Sharujan Shanmuganathan 102 (132); Allah Mohammad Ghazanfar 3/35 (10 overs)		Nazifullah Amiri 33 (34); Praveen Maneesha 3/16 (3.2 overs)

Sri Lanka won by 131 runs
Sharjah Cricket Stadium, Sharjah
Umpires: Tanvir Ahmed (Ban) and Rohan Pandit (Ind)
Player of the match: Sharujan Shanmuganathan (SL)

- Sri Lanka won the toss and elected to bat.
- Sharujan Shanmuganathan (SL) scored his maiden century in YODIs.

3 December 2024
09:00
Scorecard

Sri Lanka; 228 (49.2 overs)	v	Bangladesh; 221 (49.3 overs)
Vimath Dinsara 106 (132); Mohammad Al Fahad 4/50 (9.2 overs)		Kalam Siddiki 95 (134); Vihas Thewmika 3/37 (10 overs)

Sri Lanka won by 7 runs
Dubai International Cricket Stadium, Dubai
Umpires: Faisal Afridi (Pak) and Rohan Pandit (Ind)
Player of the match: Vimath Dinsara (SL)

- Sri Lanka won the toss and elected to bat.

3 December 2024
09:00
Scorecard

Afghanistan; 123 (35.4 overs)	v	Nepal; 124/9 (41.3 overs)
Faisal Shinozada 52 (67); Unish Thakuri 3/24 (10 overs)		Naren Saud 26 (54); Khatir Stanikzai 3/31 (10 overs)

Nepal won by 1 wicket
Sharjah Cricket Stadium, Sharjah
Umpires: Akbar Ali (UAE) and Ravindra Kottahachchi (SL)
Player of the match: Hemant Dhami (Nep)

- Afghanistan won the toss and elected to bat.

== Knockout stage ==
Semi-finals
A1	Pakistan	116 (37 overs)
B2	Bangladesh	120/3 (22.1 overs)
B1	Sri Lanka	173 (46.2 overs)
A2	India	175/3 (21.4 overs)

Final
SFW1	Bangladesh	198 (49.1 overs)
SFW2	India	139 (35.2 overs)

=== Semi-finals ===
==== Semi-final 1 ====
6 December 2024
09:00
Scorecard

Pakistan; 116 (37 overs)	v	Bangladesh; 120/3 (22.1 overs)
Farhan Yousaf 32 (32); Iqbal Hossain Emon 4/24 (7 overs)		Azizul Hakim Tamim 61* (42); Naveed Ahmed Khan 1/13 (3.1 overs)

Bangladesh won by 7 wickets
Dubai International Cricket Stadium, Dubai
Umpires: Ravindra Kottahachchi (SL) and Rohan Pandit (Ind)
Player of the match: Iqbal Hossain Emon (Ban)

- Bangladesh won the toss and elected to field.

==== Semi-final 2 ====
6 December 2024
09:00
Scorecard

Sri Lanka; 173 (46.2 overs)	v	India; 175/3 (21.4 overs)
Lakvin Abeysinghe 69 (110); Chetan Sharma 3/34 (8 overs)		Vaibhav Sooryavanshi 67 (36); Praveen Maneesha 1/27 (5.4 overs)

India won by 7 wickets
Sharjah Cricket Stadium, Sharjah
Umpires: Faisal Afridi (Pak) and Tanvir Ahmed (Ban)
Player of the match: Vaibhav Sooryavanshi (Ind)

- Sri Lanka won the toss and elected to bat.

=== Final ===
8 December 2024
09:00
Scorecard

Bangladesh; 198 (49.1 overs)	v	India; 139 (35.2 overs)
Rizan Hossan 47 (65); Yudhajit Guha 2/29 (9.1 overs)		Mohamed Amaan 26 (65); Azizul Hakim Tamim 3/8 (2.2 overs)

Bangladesh won by 59 runs
Dubai International Cricket Stadium, Dubai
Umpires: Farooq Khan (Afg) and Ravindra Kottahachchi (SL)
Player of the match: Iqbal Hossain Emon (Ban)

- India won the toss and elected to field.

== Statistics ==
=== Most Runs ===
Player	Team	Innings	Runs	Average	High score
Shahzaib Khan	Pakistan U19	4	336	84.00	159
Azizul Tamim	Bangladesh U19	5	240	80.00	103
Muhammad Riazullah	Pakistan U19	4	227	75.66	106
S Shanmuganathan	Sri Lanka U19	4	210	52.50	102
Mohamed Amaan	India U19	4	189	94.50	122*

- Source: ESPNCricinfo

=== Most Wickets ===
Player	Team	Matches	Wickets	Best bowling
Iqbal Hossain Emon	Bangladesh U19	5	13	4/24
Al Fahad	Bangladesh U19	5	12	4/50
Chetan Sharma	India U19	4	9	3/34
Abdul Subhan	Pakistan U19	3	9	6/57
P Maneesha	Sri Lanka U19	4	8	3/16

- Source: ESPNCricinfo

== See also ==
- 2024 ACC Under-19 Women's T20 Asia Cup
