= Anvay Dravid =

Indian cricketer (born 2009)

Personal information
- Born: April 27, 2009 (age 17); Bengaluru, Karnataka, India
- Batting: Right-handed
- Role: Wicket-keeper-batter

Anvay Dravid (born 27 April 2009) is an Indian cricketer who plays as a wicket-keeper-batter. He has represented Karnataka in age-group domestic cricket and has been selected for the India under-19 cricket team.

== Early life ==
Anvay Dravid was born in Bengaluru, Karnataka, on 27 April 2009. He comes from a prominent cricketing family; he is the younger son of former Indian captain and coach Rahul Dravid and doctor Vijeta Pendharkar, and the younger brother of cricketer Samit Dravid. He attended Mallya Aditi International School in Bengaluru.

== Domestic career ==
Anvay rose through the ranks of Karnataka's junior cricket structure. In January 2023, he was appointed captain of the Karnataka Under-14 team. He made notable contributions in state leagues, such as the KSCA U-14 league playing for Vijaya Cricket Club, where he scored heavily with multiple centuries.

He subsequently progressed to the under-16 level, representing Karnataka in the Vijay Merchant Trophy. During the 2023–24 Vijay Merchant Trophy season, he emerged as one of the leading run-scorers for his side, accumulating significant runs with a high batting average and recording multiple half-centuries and centuries. His consistent performances in domestic junior circuits earned him consecutive KSCA Annual Awards for Best Under-16 Batsman.

== International career ==
Anvay earned selection into the India Under-19 squads, participating in developmental series and tours, including matches during the India Under-19 tour of Sri Lanka and subsequent youth ODI fixtures.
