= Lakshya Raichandani =

Indian cricketer (born 2008)

Personal information
- Born: 15 October 2008 (age 18); Gonda, Uttar Pradesh, India
- Batting: Right-handed
- Bowling: Right-arm off-break
- Role: opening batsman

Domestic team information
- Years: Team
- 2026: Uttarakhand cricket team

Career statistics
Competition	FC
Matches	7
Runs scored	304
Batting average	33.77
100s/50s	/3
Top score	86
Catches/stumpings	7/
- Source: cricinfo, 16 November 2026

Lakshya Raichandani (born 15 October 2008) is an Indian cricketer. He is a right-handed opening batter and an occasional right-arm off bowler. He currently represents the India national under-19 cricket team, winning the 2026 Under-19 Asia Cup with the side.

== Career ==
On 22 January 2026, Raichandani made his first-class debut for Uttarakhand against Tripura in the 2025–26 Ranji Trophy in Agartala, Tripura. In November 2026, he captained the India national under-19 cricket team to victory in the 2026 ACC Under-19 Asia Cup, scoring 80 runs in the final against Pakistan to help India chase down a target of 338.
