= 2026 ACC Under-19 Asia Cup =

Cricket tournament

- Dates: 5 – 14 November 2026
- Administrator: Asian Cricket Council
- Cricket format: 50 overs/Y-ODI
- Tournament format(s): Group stage and Knockout stage
- Host: Oman
- Champions: India (9th title)
- Runners-up: Pakistan
- Participants: 8
- Matches: 15
- Player of the series: (India) Aaryavir Sehwag
- Most runs: (India) Aaryavir Sehwag (361)
- Most wickets: (Afghanistan) Noor Ali Niazai (14) (Pakistan) Rizwanullah (14)

The 2026 ACC Under-19 Asia Cup was the thirteenth edition of the ACC Under-19 Asia Cup, a limited overs cricket tournament featuring eight under-19 teams that took place in Oman from 5 to 14 November 2026.

Pakistan were the defending champions, having claimed their second title in the final of the previous edition. In the final, India defeated Pakistan by 1 wicket to win their record 9th title.

== Venues ==
The matches were played across two venues in Al Amarat: the Oman Cricket Academy Ground Turf 1 and the Oman Cricket Academy Ground Turf 2.

== Teams and qualifications ==
The five full members of the Asian Cricket Council qualified for the tournament along with the top three teams from the 2025 Under-19 Premier Cup.

Means of qualification	Date	Host	Berths	Qualified teams
ICC Full Members	—N/a	—N/a	5	Afghanistan
ICC Full Members	—N/a	—N/a	5	Bangladesh
ICC Full Members	—N/a	—N/a	5	India
ICC Full Members	—N/a	—N/a	5	Pakistan
ICC Full Members	—N/a	—N/a	5	Sri Lanka
2025 Premier Cup	1 December 2025	United Arab Emirates	3	Malaysia
2025 Premier Cup	1 December 2025	United Arab Emirates	3	Nepal
2025 Premier Cup	1 December 2025	United Arab Emirates	3	United Arab Emirates
Total			8	

== Squads ==
Afghanistan	Bangladesh	India	Malaysia
Sohail Khan (c); Farid Zadran (vc); Subhan Ali; Noman Salarzai (wk); Faisal Mubariz; Taher Sarwary; Abidullah Abid; Hamza Alikhil; Amir Hamza; Sami Mubariz; Lutfullah Mohammadi; Mohammad Ali; Abdullah Hamdard; Imran Mohammadi; Noor Ali Niazai	Farid Hasan (c, wk); Ahsan Al Mumin (vc); Abdullah Al Muhi; Farhan Sadik; Kawser Ahmed; Tafiul Alam Tamim; Shakil Khan; Rakibul Hossan; SK Jarif Siyam; Alamin Hossain Rony; All Rafi; Robiul Hasan Anik; Sheikh Atiqur Rahman; Al Amin Hossen; Rubay Islam Rizon	Lakshya Raichandani (c); Yashbardhan Chauhan (vc); Rajat Baghel (wk); Manal Chauhan; Anvay Dravid (wk); Yashveer Goud; Kushagra Ojha; Kavya Patel; Arjun Rajput; Aryan Savsani; Aaryavir Sehwag; Ishan Sood; Mohit Ulva; VK Vineeth; Shavin Vinod	Deeaz Patro (c); Syamil Aqil; Syahir Asyraf; Aulga Gunawan; Daniel Hakimi; Alif Haziq (wk); Nur Iman; Aiyadh Iskandar; Arryan Iskandar; Syakir Izzudin; Asyraf Mikail; Harith Naufal; Muhammad Nurhanif; Nagineswaran Sathnakumaran; Dzul Syahmi; Firash Taqiuddin; Azib Wajdi
Nepal	Pakistan	Sri Lanka	United Arab Emirates
Bipin Sharma (c); Sachin Bhatta; Rohit Chand; Prashiddha Jaishi; Shubham Khanal; Suryanshu Koirala; Nischal Kshetri; Sohail Kunwar; Nitesh Patel; Aashish Luhar (wk); Sushil Rawal; Roshan Shahi; Darsh Sonar; Abhay Yadav; Niraj Kumar Yadav	Farhan Yousuf (c); Abdul Qadir (wk); Abdul Subhan; Ahmed Hussain; Ali Raza; Hamza Zahoor (wk); Hasnain Abbas Dar; Hayam Khan; Huzaifa Ahsan; Jahangir Bilal; Mohammad Huzaifa; Mohammad Seyam; Niqab Shafiq; Rizwanullah; Usman Khan	Viran Chamuditha (c); Senuja Wekunagoda (vc); Lathendra Akash; Vigneshwaran Akash; Himaru Deshan; Kaushika Kumarasinghe; Gimhan Mendis; Rehan Peiris; Stevon Peiris; Lithma Perera (wk); Gimhan Rasanjana; Chaniru Senaratne; Sethmika Seneviratne; Sanul Weeraratne; Kithma Withanapathirana	Ayaan Misbah (c); Ahmed Khudadad; Bilal Khan; Hadayatullah Khan; Muhammad Ahmed (wk); Mohamed Nafees; Muhammad Saad wk); Naseem Khan; Noorullah Ayobi; Omar Tauqir; Raizal Nadir; Uddish Suri; Umar Faisal; Yayin Rai; Zainullah Rahmani

== Group stage ==
=== Group A ===
Pos	Team	Pld	W	L	Pts	NRR	Qualification
1	Pakistan	3	3	0	6	1.186	Advanced to the knockout stage
2	India	3	2	1	4	1.533	Advanced to the knockout stage
3	United Arab Emirates	3	1	2	2	−0.385	
4	Nepal	3	0	3	0	−2.379	

Source: Cricinfo, Cricbuzz

==== Fixtures ====
6 November 2026
09:00
Scorecard

United Arab Emirates; 224 (50 overs)	v	Pakistan; 225/1 (37.3 overs)
Noorullah Ayobi 70 (55); Mohammad Sayyam 3/37 (10 overs)		Usman Khan 139* (120); Ahmed Khudadad 1/36 (8.3 overs)

Pakistan won by 9 wickets
Oman Cricket Academy Ground Turf 2, Al Amarat
Umpires: Rohan Pandit (Ind) and Ujjwal Regmi (Nep)
Player of the match: Usman Khan (Pak)

- Pakistan won the toss and elected to field.

6 November 2026
09:00
Scorecard

Nepal; 128 (42.3 overs)	v	India; 129/0 (19.1 overs)
Darsh Sonar 43 (93); Arjun Rajput 3/8 (5.3 overs)		Aaryavir Sehwag 70* (52)

India won by 10 wickets
Oman Cricket Academy Ground Turf 1, Al Amarat
Umpires: Vinod Babu (Oma) and Abdul Muqeet (Pak)
Player of the match: Ishan Sood (Ind)

- India won the toss and elected to field.

8 November 2026
09:00
Scorecard

Nepal; 153 (41 overs)	v	United Arab Emirates; 158/3 (34.4 overs)
Sohail Kunwar 33 (71); Naseem Khan 5/43 (8 overs)		Ayaan Misbah 75 (104); Bipin Sharma 1/24 (6 overs)

United Arab Emirates won by 7 wickets
Oman Cricket Academy Ground Turf 2, Al Amarat
Umpires: Rohan Pandit (Ind) and Denish Sevakumaran (Mas)
Player of the match: Ayaan Misbah (UAE)

- United Arab Emirates won the toss and elected to field.

8 November 2026
09:00
Scorecard

India; 208 (46.3 overs)	v	Pakistan; 209/7 (48.1 overs)
Arjun Rajput 107 (85); Rizwanullah 3/24 (7 overs)		Hamza Zahoor 100* (108); Manal Chauhan 3/32 (10 overs)

Pakistan won by 3 wickets
Oman Cricket Academy Ground Turf 1, Al Amarat
Umpires: Tanvir Ahmed (Ban) and Raveendra Wimalasiri (SL)
Player of the match: Hamza Zahoor (Pak)

- India won the toss and elected to bat.
- Abdul Qadir (Pak) made his Y-ODI debut.

10 November 2026
09:00
Scorecard

India; 309/7 (50 overs)	v	United Arab Emirates; 239 (50 overs)
Aaryavir Sehwag 160 (168); Naseem Khan 4/48 (10 overs)		Ahmed Khudadad 74 (74); Ishan Sood 4/37 (7 overs)

India won by 70 runs
Oman Cricket Academy Ground Turf 2, Al Amarat
Umpires: Abdul Muqeet (Pak) and Ajmal Shamalzai (Afg)
Player of the match: Aaryavir Sehwag (Ind)

- United Arab Emirates won the toss and elected to field.

10 November 2026
09:00
Scorecard

Pakistan; 275/7 (50 overs)	v	Nepal; 174 (43.4 overs)
Ahmed Hussain 89 (73); Bipin Sharma 3/58 (10 overs)		Rohit Chand 37 (54); Ahmed Hussain 4/35 (10 overs)

Pakistan won by 101 runs
Oman Cricket Academy Ground Turf 1, Al Amarat
Umpires: Denish Sevakumaran (Mas) and Raveendra Wimalasiri (SL)
Player of the match: Ahmed Hussain (Pak)

- Nepal won the toss and elected to field.

=== Group B ===
Pos	Team	Pld	W	L	Pts	NRR	Qualification
1	Afghanistan	3	3	0	6	3.176	Advanced to the knockout stage
2	Bangladesh	3	2	1	4	0.913	Advanced to the knockout stage
3	Sri Lanka	3	1	2	2	−0.012	Eliminated
4	Malaysia	3	0	3	0	−5.079	Eliminated

Source: Cricinfo, Cricbuzz

==== Fixtures ====
5 November 2026
09:00
Scorecard

Malaysia; 88 (28.1 overs)	v	Sri Lanka; 91/1 (13.5 overs)
Syamil Aqil 51 (50); Kaushika Kumarasinghe 5/30 (6 overs)		Rehan Peiris 54* (45); Nagineswaran Sathnakumaran 1/15 (4 overs)

Sri Lanka won by 9 wickets
Oman Cricket Academy Ground Turf 2, Al Amarat
Umpires: Tanvir Ahmed (Ban) and Ajmal Shamalzai (Afg)
Player of the match: Kaushika Kumarasinghe (SL)

- Sri Lanka won the toss and elected to field.

5 November 2026
09:00
Scorecard

Afghanistan; 231 (49 overs)	v	Bangladesh; 118 (25.5 overs)
Shah Faisal Rahimi 83 (97); Tafiul Alam Tamim 4/41 (10 overs)		SK Jarif Siyam 41 (58); Sami Mubarez 3/11 (2.5 overs)

Afghanistan won by 113 runs
Oman Cricket Academy Ground Turf 1, Al Amarat
Umpires: Rohan Pandit (Ind) and Raveendra Wimalasiri (SL)
Player of the match: Shah Faisal Rahimi (Afg)

- Afghanistan won the toss and elected to bat.
- Tafiul Alam Tamim (Ban) made his Y-ODI debut.

7 November 2026
09:00
Scorecard

Malaysia; 42 (22.3 overs)	v	Afghanistan; 47/0 (3 overs)
Nagineswaran Sathnakumaran 20 (33); Noor Ali Niazai 6/7 (9.3 overs)		Faridullah Ihsas 26* (11)

Afghanistan won by 10 wickets
Oman Cricket Academy Ground Turf 2, Al Amarat
Umpires: Suneej K. Thottathil (UAE) and Tanvir Ahmed (Ban)
Player of the match: Noor Ali Niaza (Afg)

- Afghanistan won the toss and elected to field.

7 November 2026
09:00
Scorecard

Bangladesh; 245 (49.4 overs)	v	Sri Lanka; 200 (46.1 overs)
Ahsan Al Mumin 82 (98); Sethmika Seneviratne 4/52 (9.4 overs)		Senuja Wekunagoda 85 (95); Sheikh Atiqur Rahman 2/28 (8.1 overs)

Bangladesh won by 45 runs
Oman Cricket Academy Ground Turf 1, Al Amarat
Umpires: Abdul Muqeet (Pak) and Ajmal Shamalzai (Afg)
Player of the match: Ahsan Al Mumin (Ban)

- Sri Lanka won the toss and elected to field.
- Chaniru Senaratne, Gimhan Rasanjana, Kaushika Kumarasinghe and Lithma Perera (SL) all made their Y-ODI debut.

9 November 2026
09:00
Scorecard

Bangladesh; 303/8 (50 overs)	v	Malaysia; 98 (30.5 overs)
Ahsan Al Mumin 152* (133); Aulga Gunawan 2/48 (8 overs)		Nagineswaran Sathnakumaran 50 (81); Tafiul Alam Tamim 7/18 (7.5 overs)

Bangladesh won by 205 runs
Oman Cricket Academy Ground Turf 2, Al Amarat
Umpires: Vinod Babu (Oma) and Raveendra Wimalasiri (SL)
Player of the match: Ahsan Al Mumin (Ban)

- Bangladesh won the toss and elected to bat.

9 November 2026
09:00
Scorecard

Afghanistan; 275 (49.5 overs)	v	Sri Lanka; 169 (34.1 overs)
Subhan Zakhail 107 (111); Sethmika Seneviratne 3/44 (9.5 overs)		Kithma Withanapathirana 58 (48); Noor Ali Niazai 4/35 (9 overs)

Afghanistan won by 106 runs
Oman Cricket Academy Ground Turf 1, Al Amarat
Umpires: Tanvir Ahmed (Ban) and Rohan Pandit (Ind)
Player of the match: Subhan Zakhail (Afg)

- Sri Lanka won the toss and elected to field.
- Abdullah Hamdard (Afg) made his Y-ODI debut.

== Knockout stage ==
=== Bracket ===
Semi-finals
A1	Pakistan	141/1 (21.5 overs)
B2	Bangladesh	138 (31.4 overs)
B1	Afghanistan	227/8 (50 overs)
A2	India	230/2 (36.5 overs)

Final
SF1W	Pakistan	337/9 (50 overs)
SF2W	India	339/9 (50 overs)

=== Semi-finals ===
Semi-final 1
12 November 2026
09:00
Scorecard

Bangladesh; 138 (31.4 overs)	v	Pakistan; 141/1 (21.5 overs)
Abdullah Al Muhi 50 (45); Rizwanullah 5/30 (8 overs)		Hayam Khan 69 (72); Robiul Hasan Anik 1/22 (4 overs)

Pakistan won by 9 wickets
Oman Cricket Academy Ground Turf 2, Al Amarat
Umpires: Rohan Pandit (Ind) and Raveendra Wimalasiri (SL)
Player of the match: Rizwanullah (Pak)

- Bangladesh won the toss and elected to bat.

Semi-final 2
12 November 2026
09:00
Scorecard

Afghanistan; 227/8 (50 overs)	v	India; 230/2 (36.5 overs)
Shah Faisal Rahimi 51 (72); Ishan Sood 3/43 (9 overs)		Lakshya Raichandani 93 (90); Sohail Khan 1/56 (9 overs)

India won by 8 wickets
Oman Cricket Academy Ground Turf 1, Al Amarat
Umpires: Tanvir Ahmed (Ban) and Abdul Muqeet (Pak)
Player of the match: Lakshya Raichandani (Ind)

- Afghanistan won the toss and elected to bat.
- Bilal Salimankhil (Afg) made his Y-ODI debut.

=== Final ===
14 November 2026
09:00
Scorecard

Pakistan; 337/9 (50 overs)	v	India; 339/9 (50 overs)
Usman Khan 107 (111); Kavya Patel 4/68 (10 overs)		Lakshya Raichandani 80 (101); Rizwanullah 3/53 (10 overs)

India won by 1 wicket
Oman Cricket Academy Ground Turf 2, Al Amarat
Umpires: Tanvir Ahmed (Ban) and Raveendra Wimalasiri (SL)
Player of the match: Mohit Ulva (Ind)

- Pakistan won the toss and elected to bat.
