= Mohit Ulva =

Indian cricketer (born 2007)

Personal information
- Born: 30 November 2007 (age 18); Surendranagar,Gujarat
- Batting: Right-handed
- Bowling: Right-arm-medium
- Role: Bowling All-rounder

International information
- National side: India

Mohit Ulva Rabari (born 30 November 2007) is an Indian cricketer who represents the India national under-19 cricket team. He is a right-handed batter and right-arm medium-fast bowler from Lakhtar village, District Surendranagar, Gujarat.

Ulva(Rabari) came to prominence during the 2026 ACC Under-19 Asia Cup final against Pakistan, scoring an unbeaten 49 runs off 26 balls. He hit the winning boundary on the final ball as India secured the title.
