= Yashbardhan Chauhan =

Indian cricketer (born 2008)

Personal information
- Born: 25 November 2008 (age 17); Gwalior,Madhya Pradesh,India
- Batting: Right-handed
- Bowling: Right-arm off-break
- Role: Middle-order batsman
- Source: cricinfo, 16 November 2026

Yashbardhan Chauhan (born 25 November 2008) is an Indian cricketer. He is a right-handed middle-order batsman and an occasional right-arm off bowler. He currently represents the India national under-19 cricket team, winning the 2026 Under-19 Asia Cup with the side.

== Career ==
In June 2026, Chauhan was appointed captain of the India national under-19 cricket team for their Youth ODI and multi-day tour of Sri Lanka. In September 2026, during Australia Under-19's tour of India, he scored a 100-ball 122 and took two wickets in the second Youth ODI in Rajkot to help India clinch the series In November 2026, he represented India at the 2026 ACC Under-19 Asia Cup in Oman
