= Aaryavir Sehwag =

Indian cricketer (born 2007)

Personal information
- Born: 19 October 2007 (age 19); Delhi, India
- Batting: Right-handed
- Bowling: Right-arm leg spin
- Role: Top-order batter
- Relatives: Virender Sehwag (father)

Domestic team information
- Years: Team
- 2025: Central Delhi Kings
- 2026–present: West Delhi Lions

Aaryavir Sehwag (born 19 October 2007) is an Indian cricketer. He is a right-handed top-order batter and an occasional right-arm leg spin bowler. He currently represents the India national under-19 cricket team, winning the 2026 Under-19 Asia Cup with the side.

== Early life ==
Aaryavir Sehwag was born on 19 October 2007 to the then Indian national cricket team player Virender Sehwag and Aarti Sehwag (née Ahlawat). He studied at Sehwag International School, owned by his father, and trained there at its academy in Jhajjar, Haryana.

== Youth career ==
=== Domestic career ===
Sehwag represented the Delhi cricket team in age-group cricket. He made his debut for its under-19 side in the 2024 Vinoo Mankad trophy, making 49 runs against Manipur under-19. He attracted attention after scoring 297 runs off 309 balls against Meghalaya under-19 in the 2024 Cooch Behar trophy, hitting 51 fours and three sixes.

Sehwag was named captain for the under-19 team in the 2026–27 Vinoo Mankad trophy. On 16 October 2026, he scored 173 runs off 143 balls in a group-stage match against Chandigarh, although the team lost by five wickets.

=== International career ===
Sehwag received his first call up to the India national under-19 team in September 2026 for a three-match One Day International (ODI) series against Australia under-19. He made scores of 28, 47 and 34 in the matches.

On 30 October 2026, he was named in the squad for the 2026 ACC Under-19 Asia Cup in Oman. He began the tournament scoring 70* runs off 52 balls against Nepal. He then hit 160 runs off 168 balls in a 70-run win against the United Arab Emirates; his innings consisting of 17 fours and seven sixes. He reached his century in 131 balls while sharing a 193-run partnership with VK Vineeth. The win ensured India's place in the semi-finals of the competition, where they faced Afghanistan. In that match, he scored a half-century, and helped India to an eight-wicket win that took them to the final. In the final against Pakistan, with India chasing 338, he made another half-century, with 58 runs coming off 61 balls, despite suffering an elbow injury during the match. India subsequently managed to win the match on the last ball, making them champions. Sehwag finished as the top run-scorer of the tournament, with 361 runs in 5 innings, and won the Player of the Tournament award.

== Franchise career ==
Sehwag began his franchise career when he was purchased by Central Delhi Kings of the Delhi Premier League for INR 8 lakh in the 2025 draft. He scored 22 runs on his debut and made one more appearance for the side. He was not retained for the 2026 season and was bought by West Delhi Lions for INR 3 lakh. He made two appearances, scoring 24 runs, with his debut earning comparisons to his father's technique.
