= Jehan Jaymon =

Sri Lankan cricketer (born 1971)

Personal information
- Full name: Raden Jehan Jaymon
- Born: 16 January 1971 (age 55)
- Batting: Left-handed
- Bowling: Right-arm medium
- Source: Cricinfo, 19 April 2021

Jehan Jaymon (born 16 January 1971) is a Sri Lankan former cricketer. He played in 53 first-class matches between 1989/90 and 1996/97, scoring more than 2,000 runs, including a double century.
