= Ananda Bandaranayake =

Sri Lankan cricketer (born 1971)

Personal information
- Full name: Ananda Hulugalle Bandaranayake
- Born: 31 October 1971 (age 54)
- Batting: Left-handed
- Bowling: Right-arm offbreak
- Source: Cricinfo, 19 April 2021

Ananda Bandaranayake (born 31 October 1971) is a Sri Lankan former cricketer and cricket coach. He played in 50 first-class matches between 1989/90 and 1998/99.
