= Sharujan Shanmuganathan =

Sri Lankan cricketer

Personal information
- Born: 25 April 2006 (age 20)
- Batting: Left-handed
- Role: Wicket-keeper-batter

Domestic team information
- Years: Team
- 2023–present: Nugegoda Sports and Welfare Club

Career statistics
Competition	FC	LA
Matches	4	3
Runs scored	45	1
Batting average	11.25	–
100s/50s	0/0	0/0
Top score	20*	1*
Catches/stumpings	5/0	0/0
- Source: Cricinfo, 22 March 2025

Sharujan Shanmuganathan (born 25 April 2006) is a Sri Lankan cricketer. He plays age-group cricket representing Sri Lanka national under-19 cricket team.

== Biography ==
He rose to prominence and limelight at an early age due to his stroke-making abilities being compared to those of veteran former Sri Lankan wicketkeeper batsman Kumar Sangakkara. It was during a test match that was played between Sri Lanka and Australia in 2011 on Sri Lankan soil that he caught the attention of viewers when his free-flowing, elegant cover drive became a talking point as it was captured by one of the cameramen during the course of the test match. Sharujan was only five-years-old when he received recognition for playing cover drives, and commentator Tony Greig, who was named as one of the commentators for the test match, reportedly spotted him playing at the grass bank of the Singhalese Sports Club Cricket Ground. Tony Greig eventually nicknamed him "Little Sanga" during the air while doing commentary (especially when Australian team was batting with Phillip Hughes alongside Ricky Ponting were at the crease), and Greig later went on to interview the five-year-old Sharujan, which became an instant hit on television. Kumar Sangakkara himself praised Sharujan following the immense popularity he gained and he also received praise from former Pakistani fast bowler Waqar Younis.

He began his studies at St Benedict's College where he furthered his ambitions in cricket. His father Nathan Shanmuganathan is a professional photographer. He learnt the basics of cricket techniques from Nelson Mendis.

== Career ==
He was then admitted to a cricket academy by his father when he was six years old. He received an opportunity to play in under-10 category at an inter-house cricket tournament organised by CCC School of Cricket in 2013. He eventually claimed the top honours such as best player, player of the tournament and player of the final awards during the inter-house cricket tournament organised by CCC School of Cricket in 2013. He was also a member of the CCC School of Cricket team which toured Bangalore to compete in the Imtiaz Ahmed – Nelson Mendis Challenge Trophy.

In March 2023, he played in the annual schools big match encounter against rivals Wesley College and scored 98 batting at number three position during the first innings of St. Benedict's College. He reached 1000 runs in the U19 Division One Interschools Two Day Cricket Tournament for the 2022/23 season.

He made his first-class debut playing for Nugegoda Sports and Welfare Club against Ragama Cricket Club on 22 September 2023 in the Major League Tournament. He was named in Sri Lankan squad for the 2023 ACC Under-19 Asia Cup which was held in the United Arab Emirates. In January 2024, he was named in Sri Lankan squad for the 2024 Under-19 Cricket World Cup.
