= India national under-19 cricket team =

Indian men's U19 cricket team

India Under-19s
- Association: Board of Control for Cricket in India

Personnel
- Captain: Lakshya Raichandani
- Coach: Hrishikesh Kanitkar

Team information
- Colours: Blue
- Founded: 1979

History
- U19 Cricket World Cup wins: (gold) (2000, 2008, 2012, 2018, 2022, 2026)
- U19 Asia Cup wins: (gold) (1989, 2003, 2012, 2013–14, 2016, 2018, 2019, 2021, 2026)

International Cricket Council
- ICC region: Asia
Test kit
ODI kit
- As of 14 November 2026

The India men's national Under-19 cricket team represents India in international cricket at the Under-19 level. It is administered by the Board of Control for Cricket in India. India are the current holders of the U19 Cricket World Cup and the U19 Asia Cup.

The team has won the U19 Cricket World Cup, a record six times and finished runners-up four times. In 2000, they won it under the captaincy of Mohammad Kaif, in 2008, they won it under Virat Kohli's leadership, in 2012 under Unmukt Chand, in 2018 under Prithvi Shaw, and in 2022 under Yash Dhull. Ayush Mhatre led the team to their 6th title in 2026.

The team has also won the U19 Asia Cup, a record nine times, in 1989, 2003, 2012, 2013–14, 2016, 2018, 2019, 2021 and 2026.

The team is currently captained by Lakshya Raichandani, and coached by former India cricketer Hrishikesh Kanitkar.

== Current squad ==
The list of players who were selected for the 2026 ACC Under-19 Asia Cup are mentioned below:

- Lakshya Raichandani (c)
- Yashbardhan Chauhan (vc)
- Rajat Baghel (wk)
- Manal Chauhan
- Anvay Dravid (wk)
- Yashveer Goud
- Kushagra Ojha
- Kavya Patel
- Arjun Rajput
- Aryan Savsani
- Aaryavir Sehwag
- Ishan Sood
- Mohit Ulva
- VK Vineeth
- Shavin Vinod

== Coaching staff ==
Position	Name
Head coach	Hrishikesh Kanitkar
Batting coach	Hrishikesh Kanitkar
Bowling coach	Sunil Joshi
Fielding coach	Munish Bali

== Tournament History ==
A red box around the year indicates tournaments played within India

Key
Champions
Runners-up
Semi-finals

=== U19 Cricket World Cup ===
India U19 Cricket World Cup record
Year	Result	Pos	№	Pld	W	L	T	NR	Most Runs	Most Wickets
(Australia) 1988	Group Stage	6th	8	7	3	4	0	0	Myluahanan Senthilnathan	Narendra Hirwani
(South Africa) 1998	Second Round	5th	16	6	4	2	0	0	Mohammad Kaif	Amit Bhandari
(Sri Lanka) 2000	Champions	1st	16	8	7	0	1	0	Ravneet Ricky	Shalabh Srivastava
(New Zealand) 2002	Semi-finals	3rd	16	7	4	3	0	0	Manvinder Bisla	Abhishek Sharma
(Bangladesh) 2004	Semi-finals	3rd	16	7	5	2	0	0	Shikhar Dhawan	Abhishek Sharma
(Sri Lanka) 2006	Runners-up	2nd	16	6	5	1	0	0	Cheteshwar Pujara	Piyush Chawla
(Malaysia) 2008	Champions	1st	16	6	6	0	0	0	Tanmay Srivastava	Iqbal Abdullah
(New Zealand) 2010	Quartar-finals	6th	16	6	3	3	0	0	Mayank Agarwal	Saurabh Netravalkar
(Australia) 2012	Champions	1st	16	6	5	1	0	0	Unmukt Chand	Ravikant Singh
(United Arab Emirates) 2014	Quarter-finals	5th	16	6	5	1	0	0	Sanju Samson	Kuldeep Yadav
(Bangladesh) 2016	Runners-up	2nd	16	6	5	1	0	0	Sarfaraz Khan	Avesh Khan
(New Zealand) 2018	Champions	1st	16	6	6	0	0	0	Shubman Gill	Anukul Roy
(South Africa) 2020	Runners-up	2nd	16	6	5	1	0	0	Yashasvi Jaiswal	Ravi Bishnoi
(Cricket West Indies) 2022	Champions	1st	16	6	6	0	0	0	Angkrish Raghuvanshi	Vicky Ostwal
(South Africa) 2024	Runners-up	2nd	16	7	6	1	0	0	Uday Saharan	Saumy Pandey
(Zimbabwe) (Namibia) 2026	Champions	1st	16	7	7	0	0	0	Vaibhav Sooryavanshi	Henil Patel & RS Ambrish
Total	6 titles			103	82	20	0	1		

=== U19 Asia Cup ===
India U19 Asia Cup record
Year	Result	Pos	№	Pld	W	L	T	NR	Most Runs	Most Wickets
(Bangladesh) 1989	Champions	1st	3	3	3	0	0	0	Bhupinder Singh	Gyanendra Pandey
(Pakistan) 2003	Champions	1st	4	4	3	1	0	0	Robin Uthappa	Irfan Pathan
(Malaysia) 2012	Champions	1st	8	5	3	1	1	0	Unmukt Chand	Roosh Kalaria
(United Arab Emirates) 2014	Champions	1st	8	5	4	1	0	0	Akhil Herwadkar	Kuldeep Yadav
(Sri Lanka) 2016	Champions	1st	8	4	4	0	0	0	Himanshu Rana	Rahul Chahar
(Malaysia) 2017	Group stage	5th	8	3	1	2	0	0	Himanshu Rana	Vivekanand Tiwari
(Bangladesh) 2018	Champions	1st	8	4	4	0	0	0	Yashasvi Jaiswal	Siddharth Desai
(Sri Lanka) 2019	Champions	1st	8	5	4	1	0	0	Arjun Azad	Atharva Ankolekar
(United Arab Emirates) 2021	Champions	1st	8	5	4	1	0	0	Harnoor Singh	Vicky Ostwal
(United Arab Emirates) 2023	Semi-Finals	4th	8	4	2	2	0	0	Arshin Kulkarni	Raj Limbani
(United Arab Emirates) 2024	Runners-up	2nd	8	5	3	2	0	0	Mohamed Amaan	Chetan Sharma
(United Arab Emirates) 2025	Runners-up	2nd	8	5	4	1	0	0	Abhigyan Kundu	Deepesh Devendran
(Oman) 2026	Champions	1st	8	5	4	1	0	0	Aaryavir Sehwag	Ishan Sood
Total	9 titles			57	43	13	1	0		

== Honours ==
India national under-19 cricket team honours
Type	Competition	Titles	Seasons
ICC Championships	U19 Cricket World Cup	6	Champions (6): 2000, 2008, 2012, 2018, 2022, 2026; Runners-up (4): 2006, 2016, 2020, 2024
ACC (Continental)	U19 Asia Cup	9	Champions (9): 1989, 2003, 2012^{s}, 2013–14, 2016, 2018, 2019, 2021, 2026; Runners-up (2): 2024, 2025

record

^{s} shared record.

== Records and statistics ==
International match summary – India Under-19s

Playing record
Format	Matches	Won	Lost	Tied	Drawn/NR	Win %	Inaugural match
Youth Tests	87	33	12	0	42	37.93	20 January 1979
Youth One-Day Internationals	326	252	69	2	3	77.30	16 August 1981
Last updated 14 November 2026.

Youth Test record versus other nations

Opponent	Matches	Won	Lost	Tied	Drawn	First win
Australia	20	8	7	0	5	6 March 1994
England	27	9	2	0	16	19 February 1993
New Zealand	6	2	2	0	2	2 March 1992
Pakistan	15	4	0	0	11	2 March 1989
South Africa	7	4	1	0	2	18 April 1996
Sri Lanka	12	6	0	0	6	17 February 1997
Last updated 12 November 2026.

Youth ODI record versus other nations

Full members
Opponent	Matches	Won	Lost	Tied	NR	First win
Afghanistan	14	12	2	0	0	15 January 2010
Australia	47	32	15	0	0	9 December 1986
Bangladesh	29	22	6	0	1	12 January 2000
England	56	42	13	1	0	28 February 1988
Ireland	3	3	0	0	0	28 January 2016
New Zealand	21	18	3	0	0	20 February 1988
Pakistan	32	18	13	1	0	8 December 1989
South Africa	29	23	6	0	0	22 April 1996
Sri Lanka	53	44	8	0	1	14 December 1989
West Indies	10	7	3	0	0	27 January 2002
Zimbabwe	7	7	0	0	0	23 November 2005
Associate Members
Opponent	Matches	Won	Lost	Tied	NR	First win
Canada	1	1	0	0	0	21 January 2002
Hong Kong	1	1	0	0	0	17 January 2010
Japan	1	1	0	0	0	21 January 2020
Kenya	1	1	0	0	0	15 January 1998
Namibia	2	2	0	0	0	6 February 2006
Netherlands	1	0	0	0	1	
Nepal	4	4	0	0	0	18 January 2000
Papua New Guinea	4	4	0	0	0	17 February 2008
Scotland	4	4	0	0	0	13 January 1998
United Arab Emirates	2	2	0	0	0	12 December 2025
Uganda	1	1	0	0	0	22 January 2022
United States	2	2	0	0	0	28 January 2024
Other Teams
Opponent	Matches	Won	Lost	Tied	NR	First win
ICC Associates XI	1	1	0	0	0	7 March 1988
Last updated 14 November 2026.

List of all tournaments won

S No	Year	Series /Tournament	Winners	Opposition	Ground	Venue	Country	Result
1	1989/90	Beximco Asia Youth Cup, 1989/90	India	Sri Lanka	Bangabandhu National Stadium	Dhaka	Bangladesh	Won by 79 runs
2	1999/00	ICC Under-19 World Cup, 1999/00	India	Sri Lanka	Sinhalese Sports Club Ground	Colombo	Sri Lanka	Won by 6 wickets
3	2003/04	Asia Under-19 Tournament, 2003/04	India	Sri Lanka	Gaddafi Stadium	Lahore	Pakistan	Won by 8 wickets
4	2005	Afro-Asia Cup Under-19s	India	Sri Lanka	Visakhapatnam District Cricket Association Stadium	Visakhapatnam	India	Won by 8 Wickets
5	2006/07	HSBC Invitational 2nd Tri-Series, 2006/07	India	England	Kinrara Academy Oval	Kuala Lumpur	Malayasia	Won by 167 runs
6	2007	Tri-Nation Under-19s Tournament in Sri Lanka, 2007	India	Bangladesh	Colts Cricket Club Ground	Colombo	Sri Lanka	Won by 129 runs
7	2007/08	ICC Under-19 World Cup, 2007/08	India	South Africa	Kinrara Academy Oval	Kuala Lumpur	Malayasia	Won by 12 runs (D/L method)
8	2009/10	Tri-Nation Under-19s Tournament	India	South Africa	King Edward VII School Ground	Johannesburg	South Africa	Match abandoned without a ball bowled
9	2011/12	Quadrangular Under-19 Series (India), 2011/12	India	Sri Lanka	VDCA Cricket Stadium	"Visakhapatnam	India	Won by 5 runs
10	2012	Quadrangular Under-19 Series (Australia), 2012	India	Australia	Endeavour Park,	Townsville		Won by 7 wickets
11	2012	Asian Cricket Council Under-19s Asia Cup	India/Pakistan		Kinrara Academy Oval	Kuala Lumpur	Malaysia	Match tied
12	2012	ICC Under -19 World Cup	India	Australia	Tony Ireland Stadium,	Townsville	Australia	Won by 6 wickets
13	2013	Quadrangular Under-19 Series	India	Australia	Marrara Cricket Ground	Darwin	Australia	Won by 8 wickets
14	2013	Quadrangular Under-19 Series (India)	India	South Africa	Dr. Y.S. Rajasekhara Reddy ACA-VDCA Cricket Stadium	Visakhapatnam	India	Won by 201 runs
15	2014	Asian Cricket Council Under-19s Asia Cup	India	Pakistan	Sharjah Cricket Stadium	Sharjah	UAE	Won by 40 runs
16	2015	TRI-NATION UNDER-19S TOURNAMENT IN INDIA	India	Bangladesh	Jadavpur University Complex	Kolkata	India	Won by 7 wickets
17	2015	Tri-Nation Under-19s Tournament in Sri Lanka	India	Sri Lanka	R.Premadasa Stadium	Colombo	Sri Lanka	Won by 5 wickets
18	2016	Asian Cricket Council Under-19s Asia Cup	India	Sri Lanka		Colombo	Sri Lanka	Won By 34 runs
19	2018	ICC Under-19 World Cup	India	Australia		Mount Maunganui	New Zealand	Won by 8 wickets
20	2018	ACC Under-19s Asia Cup	India	Sri Lanka	Shere Bangla National Stadium, Mirpur	Dhaka	Bangladesh	Won by 144 runs
21	2019	Tri-Nation Under-19s Tournament in England	India	Bangladesh		Brighton	England	Won by 6 wickets
22	2019	ACC Under-19s Asia Cup	India	Bangladesh		COLOMBO	Sri Lanka	Won by 5 runs
23	2020	Quadrangular Under-19 Series (South Africa)	India	South Africa	Kingsmead, Durban	Durban	South Africa	Won by 69 runs
24	2021	ACC Under-19s Asia Cup	India	Sri Lanka	Dubai International Cricket Stadium	Dubai	UAE	Won by 9 wickets
25	2022	ICC Under-19 World Cup	India	England	Sir Vivian Richards Stadium	North Sound	Antigua and Barbuda	Won by 4 wickets
26	2026	ICC Under-19 World Cup	India	England	Harare Sports Club	Harare	Zimbabwe	Won by 100 runs

== See also ==
- India men's national cricket team
- India women's national cricket team
- India women's national under-19 cricket team
- India A cricket team
- India B cricket team
- Board of control for cricket in india (BCCI)
- BCCI Awards
- National Cricket Academy (NCA)
- Cricket in India
- Sport in India – Overview of sports in India
- Glossary of cricket terms
